= 2008 Kansas City Chiefs season =

NFL team season

- Owner: The Hunt family (Clark Hunt Chairman and CEO)
- General manager: Carl Peterson
- Head coach: Herm Edwards
- Offensive coordinator: Chan Gailey
- Defensive coordinator: Gunther Cunningham
- Home stadium: Arrowhead Stadium

Results
- Record: 2–14
- Division place: 4th AFC West
- Playoffs: Did not qualify
- All-Pros: 1: TE Tony Gonzalez (1st team)
- Pro Bowlers: 2: TE Tony Gonzalez; G Brian Waters

The 2008 season was the Kansas City Chiefs' 39th in the National Football League (NFL), their 49th overall, and their third and final season under head coach Herm Edwards at the helm. The Chiefs failed to improve on their 4–12 record from 2007 with the youngest team in the NFL as part of their "youth movement". The season turned out to be the worst in the franchise's history at the time, by tallying 13 losses for the first time ever. The Chiefs' record tied with the St. Louis Rams where they stood 2–14.

The Chiefs' 2008 season began with a 1–10 record, with the franchise losing 19 of 20 games over a two-year period. The team lost seven games by 7 points or less, two games by 24-point margins, suffered a 34–0 shutout to the Carolina Panthers, and allowed a franchise-high 54 points against the Buffalo Bills. Following a 22–21 loss to the Chargers, a game in which Kansas City allowed two touchdowns and lost an 11-point lead in the game's final minutes, Chiefs owner Clark Hunt announced the resignation of General Manager/Vice President/CEO Carl Peterson effective at the end of the season. The Chiefs suffered instability on offense with rotation at the quarterback position and offensive gameplans, and also on defense after trading DE Jared Allen to the Minnesota Vikings. After trading Allen, who led the NFL in sacks in 2007, the Chiefs got 10 sacks on the season, setting a new NFL record for fewest sacks in a 16-game season.

The Chiefs reorganized their offense to focus around quarterback Brodie Croyle, but his season-ending injury in Week 7 led to a new spread offense gameplan focused around Tyler Thigpen. His passer rating climbed from 44.3 to 76.9 in the five games following his initial start at Atlanta. The Chiefs scored more than 10 points just twice in their first six games, but scored more offensive points than that in every game since, and twice topped 25 points. The Chiefs won their first game with the new offense against the Raiders in Week 13.

The season was the twelfth and final season in Kansas City for long-time Chiefs tight end Tony Gonzalez, who was traded to the Atlanta Falcons after the season.

== Offseason ==
Beginning with the 2008 season, the team's Lamar Hunt/American Football League tribute patch which was introduced in the 2007 season became a permanent part of the Chiefs' uniform.

=== Coaching and roster changes ===
The 2008 season is going to be a very important year for our football team. I expect us to at least compete for a playoff spot...I'm realistic and patient to some degree. But I also know that in the NFL you can quickly turn things around.

— Clark Hunt in January 2008.

Following the Chiefs loss to the New York Jets in the 2007 season finale, general manager Carl Peterson announced that both he and head coach Herman Edwards would return to the Chiefs in 2008. However, team chairman Clark Hunt—who took over leadership of the Chiefs in late 2006 after the death of his father, team founder Lamar Hunt—declined to immediately comment on Peterson's status. Hunt spoke out weeks later and stated that the Chiefs were his "No. 1 priority" and that "to have the best chance of success in 2008, having Carl here makes a lot of sense." Hunt wanted to avoid having a new general manager come in with a new head coach, and starting from scratch again. Edwards and Peterson were considered to be on the hot seat by the press, but inside the team, both were considered to be safe unless absolutely zero progress was made in 2008. Clark Hunt had expressed his expectations of a winning Chiefs team earning a playoff berth in 2008.

On January 1, the Chiefs fired offensive coordinator Mike Solari after two unproductive seasons. Offensive line coach John Matsko, receivers coach Charlie Joiner and running backs coach James Saxon were fired as well after a season in which the Chiefs were among the worst offensive teams in the NFL. Tight ends coach Jon Embree and assistant head coach/quarterbacks coach Dick Curl were the only offensive assistants who were retained.

For offensive coordinator, the Chiefs interviewed Chan Gailey, Paul Hackett, Eric Price, Mike Shula, and Jim Fassel. Both Shula and Gailey were interviewed twice. Gailey was hired on January 16. Price was later added as the team's wide receivers coach.

In addition to Gailey, the Chiefs added Bob Bicknell as their offensive line coach, and Joe D'Alessandris assistant offensive line coach. Curtis Modkins, from Gailey's staff at Georgia Tech, was added as the team's running backs coach.

By releasing several veteran players, the Chiefs began their youth movement. Overall, the 2008 Chiefs were the NFL's youngest at an average of 25.9 years of age. They had the youngest starting lineup at 25.5.

=== Free agency ===
The Chiefs had 9 unrestricted free agents heading into the 2008 off-season.

Position	Player	Tag	Date signed	2008 team	Contract (with KC)
DE	Jared Allen	Franchise	February 19 (franchised); April 22 (traded)	Minnesota Vikings	One year
K	John Carney	UFA	Not tendered a contract		
P	Dustin Colquitt	RFA	February 28	Kansas City Chiefs	Five years
KR	Eddie Drummond	UFA	Not tendered a contract		
LB	Keyaron Fox	UFA	March 12	Pittsburgh Steelers	
FB	Boomer Grigsby	RFA	March 4	Miami Dolphins	
C	Rudy Niswanger	ERFA	N/A	Kansas City Chiefs	N/A
WR	Samie Parker	UFA	April 14	Carolina Panthers	
LB	Mickey Pimentel	ERFA	N/A	Kansas City Chiefs	N/A
CB	Benny Sapp	UFA	March 25	Minnesota Vikings	
OT	Will Svitek	RFA	N/A	Kansas City Chiefs	N/A
OT	Kyle Turley	UFA	Retired		
C	Casey Wiegmann	UFA	March 21	Denver Broncos	
DE	Jimmy Wilkerson	UFA	March 1	Tampa Bay Buccaneers	
FB	Kris Wilson	UFA	March 26	Philadelphia Eagles	
RFA: Restricted free agent, UFA: Unrestricted free agent, ERFA: Exclusive rights free agent

==== Additions ====
In February, Kansas City claimed OT Anthony Alabi off waivers from the Miami Dolphins. Kansas City also agreed to two-year contracts with K Nick Novak, S Erick Harris, DT T.J. Jackson, CB Chad Johnson, OT Joe Lobdell, and G Rob Smith.

In March, Kansas City claimed FB Oliver Hoyte off waivers from the Dallas Cowboys. The team also signed free agent LB Demorrio Williams, and WR Devard Darling.

In April, Kansas City signed KR B.J. Sams, TE John Paul Foschi and C Wade Smith.

In May, the Chiefs signed a total of 23 undrafted free agents. and cornerbacks Will Poole and Jason Horton.

In August, the Chiefs signed K Jay Feely but released him the following day.

In September, the Chiefs signed QB Ingle Martin following an injury to Brodie Croyle.

In October, the Chiefs re-signed K Connor Barth, who was released at the beginning of the season at the 53-man roster deadline. Kansas City also signed QB Quinn Gray following a season-ending injury to starting QB Brodie Croyle. A slew of injuries to the Chiefs' starting lineup in October and November made the team sign several players in order to fill holes.

==== Departures ====
In February, the Chiefs released WR Eddie Kennison, OT John Welbourn, RB Gilbert Harris, DE Khreem Smith, CB Ty Law, LB Kendrell Bell, TE Jason Dunn, DT James Reed, and OT Chris Bober. After attempting to trade him for the second consecutive year, the Chiefs released FS Greg Wesley in July. In October, Kansas City released LB Napoleon Harris, and K Nick Novak.

==== Failed signings ====
The Chiefs were as aggressive as NFL rules allowed them to be in pursuing of C Jeff Faine and K Josh Brown, both of whom signed with teams on the first day of free agency. NFL rules prohibit teams from contacting prospective free agents or their agents until free agency begins. In 2008, that time was 11 p.m. on February 28. "There were probably some deals done before (the start of the league year)", Edwards said when asked why the Chiefs didn't get in the game with either player. "We didn't cheat. We abided by the rules. That's how you're supposed to do it, and that's what we did."

Entering the season, the Chiefs were unsure if injury-prone Brodie Croyle could be their quarterback of the future. Following the season-ending injury to QB Croyle, the Chiefs contacted recently retired QB Daunte Culpepper and free agent QB Bruce Gradkowski. Culpepper acted as his own agent and asked for "preposterous" contract terms, which caused many teams to cancel talks, including Kansas City. Culpepper agreed to meet with the Chiefs on October 28 for a physical and face-to-face negotiations but canceled the meeting in favor of other opportunities with the NFL.

=== Jared Allen trade ===
In February, the Chiefs placed the franchise tag on DE Jared Allen to prevent him from hitting the free agent market before the teams agree on a long-term deal. In April, reports surfaced detailing a proposed trade between Kansas City and the Minnesota Vikings which would send Allen to Minnesota in exchange for additional selections in the 2008 NFL draft. Other teams that had contacted Allen's agent include the Tampa Bay Buccaneers and the Jacksonville Jaguars. The Philadelphia Eagles also proposed a trade with Kansas City. Allen was not tagged as an exclusive rights franchise player and had the right to visit and negotiate with other teams.

Chiefs general manager Carl Peterson's relationship with Allen had been strained ever since Peterson, in the wake of Allen's DUI convictions, described him as "a young man at risk." Allen, who could be suspended for a season if he has another alcohol-related episode, had said he would not negotiate with Kansas City if he did not get a contract done by July 2009. Allen had previously voiced his wish to stay with the Chiefs.

On April 22, the Chiefs and Vikings reached an agreement on a trade package, and at roughly the same time, Allen reached an agreement in principle on a contract with the Vikings. Upon reaching the contract agreement, Allen headed to the airport and left for Minnesota.

Sources said the Vikings included a second third-round pick (No. 73) in the 2008 draft to get the deal done. They had been offering a No. 1 pick (17th in the first round) and a No. 3 (No. 82). The teams also swapped spots in the sixth round with the Vikings getting a better spot in the sixth round, sources said.

=== Draft ===
The Chiefs chose fifth overall in the 2008 NFL draft. A coin flip held at the NFL Scouting Combine determined the tie-breaker between the Chiefs, Falcons, and Raiders. The Chiefs had a league-high 13 selections heading into the draft.

Kansas City was interested in defensive end Chris Long following the departure of Jared Allen, but ended up with Glenn Dorsey after he slipped to #5 overall. Kansas City had Dorsey rated higher than Long, despite not having an immediate need at the position. Regardless of concern from NFL scouts about a previous leg injury to Dorsey which may cause him to get surgery in the near future, Kansas City selected Dorsey fifth overall. Dorsey and OT Branden Albert, Kansas City's other first-round selection, were considered by some to be the best players in the entire Draft.

Several analysts considered Kansas City to have made the best draft selections of any team. Kansas City also received the largest rookie pool to pay their 12 rookies, with a sum of $8,221,790, due in part to their two selections in the top 15 of the NFL Draft.

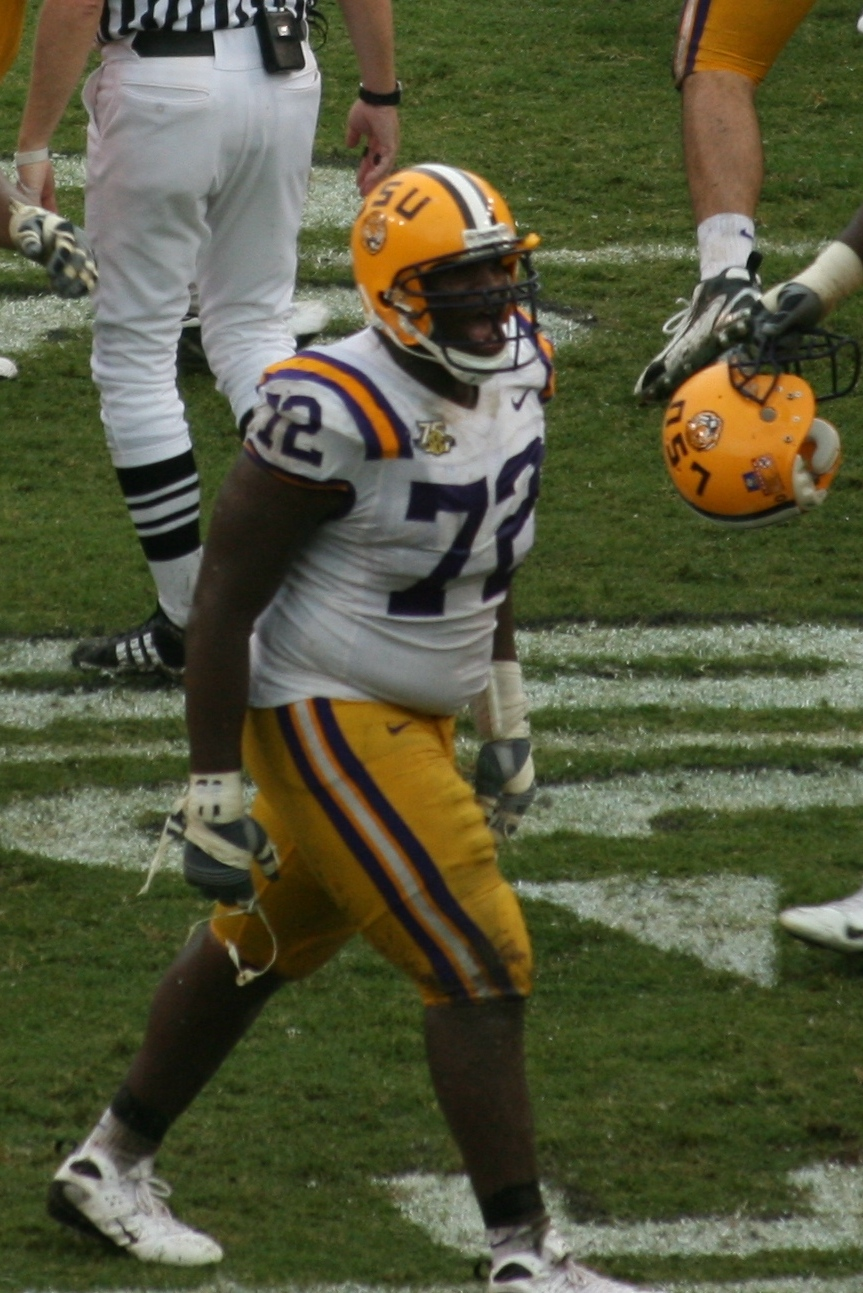
Kansas City selected Glenn Dorsey fifth overall in the 2008 NFL draft to help improve their defensive line.

2008 Kansas City Chiefs draft
Round	Selection	Player	Position	College	Contract
1	5	Glenn Dorsey	Defensive tackle	Louisiana State	Six years
1	15^{[a]}^{[e]}	Branden Albert	Guard	Virginia	Five years
2	35	Brandon Flowers	Cornerback	Virginia Tech	Four years
3	73^{[e]}	Jamaal Charles	Running back	Texas	Three years
3	76^{[a]}	Brad Cottam	Tight end	Tennessee	Three years
3	82^{[a]}	DaJuan Morgan	Safety	North Carolina State	Three years
4	105	Will Franklin	Wide receiver	Missouri	Four years
5	140^{[e]}	Brandon Carr	Cornerback	Grand Valley State	Three years
6	170	Barry Richardson	Offensive tackle	Clemson	Three years
6	182^{[a]}^{[c]}	Kevin Robinson	Wide receiver	Utah State	Three years
7	210	Brian Johnston	Linebacker	Gardner–Webb	Three years
7	239^{[d]}	Michael Merritt	Tight end	Central Florida	Three years

Notes:

^{a} Obtained Minnesota's first round selection (#17), and two third round selections (#73, #82) in exchange for DE Jared Allen. The teams also swapped sixth round selections (Kansas City moved from #187 to #182).
^{b} Obtained Miami's fifth round selection (#136) in exchange for QB Trent Green. The selection was later traded to Detroit.
^{c} Obtained Tampa Bay's sixth round selection (#187) in exchange for RB Michael Bennett. The selection was later swapped with Minnesota.
^{d} Obtained New York's seventh round selection (#239) in exchange for K Lawrence Tynes.
^{e} (Draft day trade) Obtained Detroit's first round selection (#15) and third round selection (#76) in exchange for the Chiefs' first round selection (#17), third round selection (#66) and fifth round selection (#136).

=== Roster ===
Kansas City Chiefs 2008 final roster
Quarterbacks: 8 Quinn Gray; 4 Tyler Thigpen; Running backs: 26 Jackie Battle; 25 Jamaal Charles; 42 Mike Cox FB; 27 Larry Johnson; Wide receivers: 82 Dwayne Bowe; 83 Mark Bradley; 81 Devard Darling; 85 Will Franklin; 14 Kevin Robinson; 80 Jeff Webb; Tight ends: 87 Brad Cottam; 88 Tony Gonzalez; 45 Michael Merritt	Offensive linemen: 76 Branden Albert T; 71 Andrew Carnahan T; 73 Adrian Jones G; 77 Damion McIntosh T; 64 Rudy Niswanger C; 67 Barry Richardson T; 74 Wade Smith C/G; 75 Herb Taylor T; 65 Tavares Washington G; 54 Brian Waters G; Defensive linemen: 94 Jason Babin DE; 70 Alfonso Boone DE/DT; 72 Glenn Dorsey DT; 95 Ron Edwards DT; 92 Wallace Gilberry DE; 91 Tamba Hali DE; 69 Derek Lokey DT; 96 Andy Studebaker DE; 93 Tank Tyler DT	Linebackers: 50 Rocky Boiman MLB/OLB; 57 Weston Dacus OLB; 52 Curtis Gatewood OLB; 56 Derrick Johnson MLB/OLB; 55 Pat Thomas MLB; 53 Demorrio Williams OLB; Defensive backs: 39 Brandon Carr CB; 35 Oliver Celestin SS; 30 Ricardo Colclough CB; 24 Brandon Flowers CB; 34 David Macklin CB; 47 Jon McGraw FS; 38 DaJuan Morgan FS; 44 Jarrad Page FS; 49 Bernard Pollard SS; 23 Patrick Surtain CB; Special teams: 5 Connor Barth K; 2 Dustin Colquitt P; 48 Thomas Gafford LS	Reserve lists: 12 Brodie Croyle QB (IR); 51 J. P. Darche LS (IR); 59 Donnie Edwards LB (IR); 11 Damon Huard QB (IR); 97 Brian Johnston DE (IR); 31 Maurice Leggett CB (IR); 90 Turk McBride DE (IR); 21 Kolby Smith RB (IR); Practice squad: 60 Brian de la Puente G; 62 Edwin Harrison G; 15 Ingle Martin QB; 29 Dantrell Savage RB; 98 Kyle Shotwell LB; rookies in italics 53 active, 8 inactive, 5 practice squad

=== Staff ===
2008 Kansas City Chiefs staff
Front office: Chairman – Clark Hunt; President/General Manager/CEO – Carl Peterson; Executive Vice President/COO – Denny Thum; Vice president of player personnel – Bill Kuharich; Vice president of football operations – Lynn Stiles; Director of pro personnel – Ray Farmer; Director of college scouting – Chuck Cook; Director of salary cap/general counsel – Woodie Dixon; Head coaches: Head Coach – Herman Edwards; Assistant to the head coach/quarterbacks – Dick Curl; Offensive coaches: Offensive coordinator – Chan Gailey; Running backs – Curtis Modkins; Wide receivers – Eric Price; Tight ends – Jon Embree; Offensive line – Bob Bicknell; Assistant offensive line – Joe D'Alessandris; Offensive assistant/quality control – Kevin Patullo	Defensive coaches: Defensive coordinator/linebackers – Gunther Cunningham; Defensive line – Tim Krumrie; Defensive backs – David Gibbs; Defensive assistant/assistant linebackers – Michael Ketchum; Defensive quality control – Daron Roberts; Special teams coaches: Special teams coordinator – Mike Priefer; Strength and conditioning: Strength and conditioning – Cedric Smith; Assistant strength and conditioning – Brent Salazar; Player development – Nate Wainright

== Preseason ==
=== Schedule ===
Week	Date	Opponent	Result	Record	Venue	Recap
1	August 7	at Chicago Bears	W 24–20	1–0	Soldier Field	Recap
2	August 16	Arizona Cardinals	L 17–27	1–1	Arrowhead Stadium	Recap
3	August 23	at Miami Dolphins	L 0–24	1–2	Dolphin Stadium	Recap
4	August 28	St. Louis Rams	W 21–17	2–2	Arrowhead Stadium	Recap

=== Game summaries ===
==== Week 1: at Chicago Bears ====
Week 1: Kansas City Chiefs at Chicago Bears – Game summary

Quarter	1	2	3	4	Total
Chiefs	7	7	0	10	24
Bears	0	3	14	3	20

at Soldier Field, Chicago, Illinois

- Date: August 7
- Game time: 7:00 p.m. CDT
- Game weather: Partly cloudy, 74 °F (23 °C)
- Game attendance: 60,751
- Referee: Ron Winter
- Recap, Game Book

Game information

First quarter

- KC – Larry Johnson 5-yard run (Connor Barth kick), 6:15. Chiefs 7–0. Drive: 16 plays, 81 yards, 8:45.

Second quarter

- CHI – Robbie Gould 42-yard field goal, 6:51. Chiefs 7–3. Drive: 8 plays, 19 yards, 4:26.
- KC – Maurice Price 8-yard pass from Damon Huard (Connor Barth kick), 0:11. Chiefs 14–3. Drive: 8 plays, 75 yards, 4:33.

Third quarter

- CHI – Garrett Wolfe 25-yard pass from Rex Grossman (Robbie Gould kick), 7:38. Chiefs 14–10. Drive: 1 play, 25 yards, 0:09.
- CHI – Brandon Rideau 13-yard pass from Caleb Hanie (Robbie Gould kick), 0:23. Bears 17–14. Drive: 12 plays, 80 yards, 6:08.

Fourth quarter

- KC – Connor Barth 37-yard field goal, 9:52. Tied 17–17. Drive: 11 plays, 66 yards, 5:31.
- CHI – Robbie Gould 37-yard field goal, 3:19. Bears 20–17. Drive: 12 plays, 58 yards, 6:33.
- KC – Bobby Sippio 27-yard pass from Tyler Thigpen (Connor Barth kick), 1:08. Chiefs 24–20. Drive: 6 plays, 60 yards, 2:11.

Top passers

- KC – Tyler Thigpen – 8/16, 113 yards, TD, INT
- CHI – Caleb Hanie – 9/16, 101 yards, TD

Top rushers

- KC – Dantrell Savage – 5 rushes, 30 yards
- CHI – Garrett Wolfe – 7 rushes, 64 yards

Top receivers

- KC – Bobby Sippio – 3 receptions, 57 yards, TD
- CHI – P. J. Pope – 4 receptions, 39 yards

==== Week 2: vs. Arizona Cardinals ====
Week 2: Arizona Cardinals at Kansas City Chiefs – Game summary

Quarter	1	2	3	4	Total
Cardinals	0	6	14	7	27
Chiefs	3	3	3	8	17

at Arrowhead Stadium, Kansas City, Missouri

- Date: August 16
- Game time: 7:00 p.m. CDT
- Game weather: Clear, 82 °F (28 °C)
- Game attendance: 70,203
- Referee: Pete Morelli
- Recap, Game Book

Game information

First quarter

- KC – Nick Novak 32-yard field goal, 7:48. Chiefs 3–0. Drive: 12 plays, 46 yards, 7:12.

Second quarter

- ARI – Tim Hightower 4-yard run (kick failed, wide left), 12:41. Cardinals 6–3. Drive: 13 plays, 78 yards, 6:50.
- KC – Connor Barth 35-yard field goal, 4:57. Tied 6–6. Drive: 12 plays, 53 yards, 5:01.

Third quarter

- ARI – Steve Breaston 14-yard pass from Matt Leinart (Neil Rackers kick), 8:23. Cardinals 13–6. Drive: 11 plays, 70 yards, 6:37.
- KC – Nick Novak 40-yard field goal, 3:38. Cardinals 13–9. Drive: 8 plays, 35 yards, 4:45.
- ARI – Tim Castille 24-yard pass from Brian St. Pierre (Neil Rackers kick), 3:20. Cardinals 20–9. Drive: 1 play, 24 yards, 0:18.

Fourth quarter

- ARI – Dennis Keyes 84-yard interception return (Neil Rackers kick), 1:14. Cardinals 27–9.
- KC – Sergio Joachim 14-yard pass from Tyler Thigpen (Dantrell Savage run), 0:15. Cardinals 27–17. Drive: 6 plays, 60 yards, 0:59.

Top passers

- ARI – Matt Leinart – 7/11, 62 yards, TD
- KC – Tyler Thigpen – 16/27, 174 yards, TD, INT

Top rushers

- ARI – Tim Hightower – 9 rushes, 28 yards, TD
- KC – Larry Johnson – 14 rushes, 61 yards

Top receivers

- ARI – Larry Fitzgerald – 4 receptions, 46 yards
- KC – Kevin McMahan – 3 receptions, 41 yards

==== Week 3: at Miami Dolphins ====
Week 3: Kansas City Chiefs at Miami Dolphins – Game summary

Quarter	1	2	3	4	Total
Chiefs	0	0	0	0	0
Dolphins	3	14	0	7	24

at Dolphin Stadium, Miami Gardens, Florida

- Date: August 23
- Game time: 7:30 p.m. EDT/6:30 p.m. CDT
- Game weather: 78 °F (26 °C)
- Game attendance: 60,189
- Referee: Alberto Riveron
- Recap, Game Book

Game information

First quarter

- MIA – Dan Carpenter 19-yard field goal, 4:57. Dolphins 3–0. Drive: 15 plays, 65 yards, 10:03.

Second quarter

- MIA – Ted Ginn Jr. 59-yard punt return (Dan Carpenter kick), 11:26. Dolphins 10–0.
- MIA – Anthony Fasano 17-yard pass from Chad Pennington (Dan Carpenter kick), 9:36. Dolphins 17–0. Drive: 3 plays, 22 yards, 0:54.

Third quarter

- No scoring plays.

Fourth quarter

- MIA – Jalen Parmele 2-yard run (Dan Carpenter kick), 7:40. Dolphins 24–0. Drive: 4 plays, 88 yards, 2:09.

Top passers

- KC – Brodie Croyle – 12/21, 110 yards, INT
- MIA – Chad Pennington – 11/15, 94 yards, TD

Top rushers

- KC – Larry Johnson – 13 rushes, 36 yards
- MIA – Jalen Parmele – 7 rushes, 88 yards, TD

Top receivers

- KC – Kolby Smith – 4 receptions, 38 yards
- MIA – Anthony Fasano – 3 receptions, 30 yards, TD

==== Week 4: vs. St. Louis Rams ====
Week 4: St. Louis Rams at Kansas City Chiefs – Game summary

Quarter	1	2	3	4	Total
Rams	3	7	0	7	17
Chiefs	14	7	0	0	21

at Arrowhead Stadium, Kansas City, Missouri

- Date: August 28
- Game time: 7:00 p.m. CDT
- Game weather: Mostly overcast, 74 °F (23 °C)
- Game attendance: 65,686
- Referee: Bill Leavy
- Recap, Game Book

Game information

First quarter

- STL – Josh Brown 35-yard field goal, 13:33. Rams 3–0. Drive: 4 plays, 5 yards, 1:27.
- KC – Kolby Smith 14-yard run (Connor Barth kick), 8:46. Chiefs 7–3. Drive: 7 plays, 66 yards, 4:47.
- KC – Kolby Smith 4-yard run (Nick Novak kick), 1:49. Chiefs 14–3. Drive: 9 plays, 56 yards, 4:58.

Second quarter

- KC – Bobby Sippio 11-yard pass from Damon Huard (Connor Barth kick), 14:22. Chiefs 21–3. Drive: 2 plays, 31 yards, 0:29.
- STL – Dane Looker 20-yard pass from Brock Berlin (Josh Brown kick), 0:10. Chiefs 21–10. Drive: 11 plays, 66 yards, 1:59.

Third quarter

- No scoring plays.

Fourth quarter

- STL – Lance Ball 2-yard run (Josh Brown kick), 14:12. Chiefs 21–17. Drive: 12 plays, 80 yards, 7:07.

Top passers

- STL – Brock Berlin – 13/21, 107 yards, TD
- KC – Brodie Croyle – 3/4, 42 yards

Top rushers

- STL – Lance Ball – 13 rushes, 70 yards, TD
- KC – Jackie Battle – 9 rushes, 55 yards

Top receivers

- STL – Marques Hagans – 4 receptions, 47 yards
- KC – Mike Cox – 2 receptions, 31 yards

== Regular season ==
=== Schedule ===
Week	Date	Opponent	Result	Record	Venue	Recap
1	September 7	at New England Patriots	**L** 10–17	0–1	Gillette Stadium	Recap
2	September 14	**Oakland Raiders**	**L** 8–23	0–2	Arrowhead Stadium	Recap
3	September 21	at Atlanta Falcons	**L** 14–38	0–3	Georgia Dome	Recap
4	September 28	**Denver Broncos**	**W** 33–19	1–3	Arrowhead Stadium	Recap
5	October 5	at Carolina Panthers	**L** 0–34	1–4	Bank of America Stadium	Recap
6	Bye					
7	October 19	Tennessee Titans	**L** 10–34	1–5	Arrowhead Stadium	Recap
8	October 26	at New York Jets	**L** 24–28	1–6	Giants Stadium	Recap
9	November 2	Tampa Bay Buccaneers	**L** 27–30 (OT)	1–7	Arrowhead Stadium	Recap
10	November 9	at **San Diego Chargers**	**L** 19–20	1–8	Qualcomm Stadium	Recap
11	November 16	New Orleans Saints	**L** 20–30	1–9	Arrowhead Stadium	Recap
12	November 23	Buffalo Bills	**L** 31–54	1–10	Arrowhead Stadium	Recap
13	November 30	at **Oakland Raiders**	**W** 20–13	2–10	Oakland–Alameda County Coliseum	Recap
14	December 7	at **Denver Broncos**	**L** 17–24	2–11	Invesco Field at Mile High	Recap
15	December 14	**San Diego Chargers**	**L** 21–22	2–12	Arrowhead Stadium	Recap
16	December 21	Miami Dolphins	**L** 31–38	2–13	Arrowhead Stadium	Recap
17	December 28	at Cincinnati Bengals	**L** 6–16	2–14	Paul Brown Stadium	Recap

Note: Intra-division opponents are in bold text.

=== Game summaries ===
==== Week 1: at New England Patriots ====
Week 1: Kansas City Chiefs at New England Patriots – Game summary

Quarter	1	2	3	4	Total
Chiefs	0	3	0	7	**10**
**Patriots**	0	7	7	3	**17**

at Gillette Stadium, Foxborough, Massachusetts

- Date: September 7
- Game time: 1:00 p.m. EDT/12:00 p.m. CDT
- Game weather: Sunny and warm, 75 °F (24 °C)
- Game attendance: 68,756
- Referee: Carl Cheffers
- TV announcers (CBS): Greg Gumbel and Dan Dierdorf
- Recap, Game Book

Game information

**First quarter**

- No scoring plays.

**Second quarter**

- NE – Randy Moss 10-yard pass from Matt Cassel (Stephen Gostkowski kick), 11:45. Patriots 7–0. **Drive: 10 plays, 98 yards, 4:51.**
- KC – Nick Novak 40-yard field goal, 0:17. Patriots 7–3. **Drive: 13 plays, 51 yards, 5:43.**

**Third quarter**

- NE – Sammy Morris 5-yard run (Stephen Gostkowski kick), 3:01. Patriots 14–3. **Drive: 11 plays, 80 yards, 6:14.**

**Fourth quarter**

- KC – Dwayne Bowe 13-yard pass from Damon Huard (Nick Novak kick), 13:06. Patriots 14–10. **Drive: 10 plays, 63 yards, 4:55.**
- NE – Stephen Gostkowski 37-yard field goal, 2:26. Patriots 17–10. **Drive: 10 plays, 34 yards, 4:55.**

**Top passers**

- KC – Damon Huard – 8/12, 118 yards, TD, INT
- NE – Matt Cassel – 13/18, 152 yards, TD

**Top rushers**

- KC – Larry Johnson – 22 rushes, 74 yards
- NE – Sammy Morris – 10 rushes, 53 yards, TD

**Top receivers**

- KC – Devard Darling – 1 reception, 68 yards
- NE – Randy Moss – 6 receptions, 116 yards, TD

The Chiefs played the defending AFC Champion New England Patriots, and were 16 ½-point underdogs entering the game. With 7:20 left in the first quarter, safety Bernard Pollard hit quarterback Tom Brady in his left leg. Brady went down, clutching his left knee and would not return to play in the game. Backup quarterback Matt Cassel entered the game, and his first pass of the game went 51 yards to wide receiver Randy Moss. Cassel continued to excel as he was 5–6 on the drive. It ended on a 10-yard touchdown pass to Moss, giving the heavily favored Patriots the early lead in the second quarter. Five drives later the Chiefs got on the scoreboard after a 13-play drive that ended on a 40-yard field goal from kicker Nick Novak. However, New England replied with their second touchdown of the day, this time a 5-yard run by running back Sammy Morris. Chiefs quarterback Brodie Croyle was hurt when he was sacked and slammed to the turf on his shoulder. With around 50 seconds on the clock and down by a touchdown in the fourth quarter, the Chiefs had the ball near the Patriots goal line. Kansas City had a chance to score but Dwayne Bowe dropped a pass in the end zone on fourth down, resulting in a Patriots victory. The loss also gave them a franchise-worst 10-straight losses, dating back to last season. Croyle tried to throw on the sideline, but immediately indicated he was through for the day. Damon Huard substituted for Croyle and had the Chiefs on the 5-yard line when they ran out of downs. The Patriots won the game 17–10, and the Chiefs fell to an 0–1 start.

==== Week 2: vs. Oakland Raiders ====
Week 2: Oakland Raiders at Kansas City Chiefs – Game summary

Quarter	1	2	3	4	Total
**Raiders**	6	0	7	10	**23**
Chiefs	0	0	0	8	**8**

at Arrowhead Stadium, Kansas City, Missouri

- Date: September 14
- Game time: 12:00 p.m. CDT
- Game weather: Cloudy, 61 °F (16 °C)
- Game attendance: 74,480
- Referee: Walt Anderson
- TV announcers (CBS): Kevin Harlan and Rich Gannon
- Recap, Game Book

Game information

**First quarter**

- OAK – Sebastian Janikowski 56-yard field goal, 5:13. Raiders 3–0. **Drive: 6 plays, 22 yards, 3:50.**
- OAK – Sebastian Janikowski 25-yard field goal, 1:19. Raiders 6–0. **Drive: 4 plays, 2 yards, 0:54.**

**Second quarter**

- No scoring plays.

**Third quarter**

- OAK – Darren McFadden 19-yard run (Sebastian Janikowski kick), 8:22. Raiders 13–0. **Drive: 7 plays, 95 yards, 3:52.**

**Fourth quarter**

- OAK – Sebastian Janikowski 40-yard field goal, 6:53. Raiders 16–0. **Drive: 11 plays, 63 yards, 7:10.**
- KC – Tony Gonzalez 2-yard pass from Tyler Thigpen (Tyler Thigpen–Mike Cox pass), 4:04. Raiders 16–8. **Drive: 9 plays, 80 yards, 2:49.**
- OAK – Michael Bush 32-yard run (Sebastian Janikowski kick), 0:51. Raiders 23–8. **Drive: 6 plays, 58 yards, 2:14.**

**Top passers**

- OAK – JaMarcus Russell – 6/17, 55 yards
- KC – Tyler Thigpen – 14/33, 151 yards, TD, INT

**Top rushers**

- OAK – Darren McFadden – 21 rushes, 164 yards, TD
- KC – Larry Johnson – 12 rushes, 22 yards

**Top receivers**

- OAK – Zach Miller – 2 receptions, 24 yards
- KC – Dwayne Bowe – 6 receptions, 90 yards

Hoping to rebound from their tough road loss to the Patriots, the Chiefs hosted their AFC West rival, the Oakland Raiders. In the first quarter, Kansas City trailed early as Raiders kicker Sebastian Janikowski got a 56-yard and a 25-yard field goal. Chiefs quarterback Damon Huard suffered a neck injury in the first quarter and Tyler Thigpen substituted as quarterback for the remainder of the game. Huard was in for Kansas City's first two series, but didn't return after throwing an interception late in the second quarter. Marques Hagans, who was listed on the Chiefs' roster as a wide receiver, checked in as quarterback for several draw plays. The Chiefs announced at the end of the third quarter that Huard sustained "mild head trauma," a move deemed controversial as Huard never sought medical attention in the following days.

Under Thigpen, the Chiefs' offense struggled to move the ball down the field. In using three quarterbacks, the Chiefs had only 65 net yards at halftime. Raiders RB Darren McFadden got a 19-yard TD run in the third quarter. Oakland increased its lead with Janikowski nailing a 40-yard field goal in the fourth quarter. The Chiefs would respond with rookie QB Tyler Thigpen completing a 2-yard TD pass to TE Tony Gonzalez, Kansas City executed a two-point conversion pass to rookie FB Mike Cox to make them within 8 points with just over five minutes remaining. The Chiefs' two-point conversion was the team's first in two years. Kansas City lost its opportunity to tie the game as the Raiders pulled away with RB Michael Bush getting a 32-yard TD run.

The Chiefs' defense allowed the third-highest total yards on offense in franchise history. JaMarcus Russell completed only 6 of 17 passes for 55 yards and led the Raiders to a 15-point victory. Following the game, Chiefs RB Larry Johnson voiced his displeasure with the Chiefs' offense and his role with the team. With the loss, the Chiefs fell to an 0–2 record for the third consecutive year. Kansas City's 11-game losing streak (2007–2008) is the longest in franchise history. The Chiefs also lost their second consecutive game to the Raiders for the first time since 2001.

==== Week 3: at Atlanta Falcons ====
Week 3: Kansas City Chiefs at Atlanta Falcons – Game summary

Quarter	1	2	3	4	Total
Chiefs	0	7	7	0	**14**
**Falcons**	14	10	7	7	**38**

at Georgia Dome, Atlanta, Georgia

- Date: September 21
- Game time: 1:00 p.m. EDT/12:00 p.m. CDT
- Game weather: None (indoor stadium)
- Game attendance: 62,434
- Referee: Scott Green
- TV announcers (CBS): Gus Johnson and Steve Tasker
- Recap, Game Book

Game information

**First quarter**

- ATL – Michael Turner 4-yard run (Jason Elam kick), 3:20. Falcons 7–0. **Drive: 6 plays, 92 yards, 3:24.**
- ATL – Roddy White 70-yard pass from Matt Ryan (Jason Elam kick), 0:07. Falcons 14–0. **Drive: 3 plays, 69 yards, 1:26.**

**Second quarter**

- ATL – Jason Elam 27-yard field goal, 9:15. Falcons 17–0. **Drive: 4 plays, 9 yards, 1:49.**
- ATL – Michael Turner 1-yard run (Jason Elam kick), 0:17. Falcons 24–0. **Drive: 10 plays, 40 yards, 5:44.**
- KC – Dwayne Bowe 15-yard pass from Tyler Thigpen (Nick Novak kick), 0:03. Falcons 24–7. **Drive: 13 plays, 74 yards, 2:08.**

**Third quarter**

- KC – Larry Johnson 1-yard run (Nick Novak kick), 9:49. Falcons 24–14. **Drive: 9 plays, 82 yards, 5:11.**
- ATL – Michael Turner 2-yard run (Jason Elam kick), 5:13. Falcons 31–14. **Drive: 8 plays, 60 yards, 4:36.**

**Fourth quarter**

- ATL – Chris Houston 10-yard interception return (Jason Elam kick), 1:01. Falcons 38–14.

**Top passers**

- KC – Tyler Thigpen – 14/36, 128 yards, TD, 3 INT
- ATL – Matt Ryan – 12/18, 192 yards, TD

**Top rushers**

- KC – Larry Johnson – 24 rushes, 121 yards, TD
- ATL – Michael Turner – 23 rushes, 104 yards, 3 TD

**Top receivers**

- KC – Dwayne Bowe – 4 receptions, 43 yards, TD
- ATL – Roddy White – 5 receptions, 119 yards, TD

Trying to snap a two-game losing skid, the Chiefs played a Week 3 interconference duel against the Atlanta Falcons. With Damon Huard still recovering, second-year quarterback Tyler Thigpen was given the start.

In the first quarter, Kansas City's struggled as Falcons RB Michael Turner got a 4-yard TD run, along with QB Matt Ryan completing a 70-yard TD pass to WR Roddy White. In the second quarter, Atlanta increased its lead with kicker Jason Elam getting a 27-yard field goal, along with Turner's 1-yard TD run. The Chiefs would close out the first half with Thigpen completing a 15-yard TD pass to WR Dwayne Bowe.

In the third quarter, Kansas City closed in on Atlanta's lead as RB Larry Johnson got a 1-yard TD run. However, the Falcons replied with Turner's 2-yard TD run, and a fourth quarter interception sealed the win when CB Chris Houston returned it 10 yards for a touchdown.

With their twelfth consecutive loss, the Chiefs fell to 0–3.

==== Week 4: vs. Denver Broncos ====
Week 4: Denver Broncos at Kansas City Chiefs – Game summary

Quarter	1	2	3	4	Total
Broncos	0	10	3	6	**19**
**Chiefs**	6	7	3	17	**33**

at Arrowhead Stadium, Kansas City, Missouri

- Date: September 28
- Game time: 12:00 p.m. CDT
- Game weather: Mostly sunny, 74 °F (23 °C)
- Game attendance: 74,623
- Referee: Mike Carey
- TV announcers (CBS): Greg Gumbel and Dan Dierdorf
- Recap, Game Book

Game information

**First quarter**

- KC – Nick Novak 23-yard field goal, 9:05. Chiefs 3–0. **Drive: 9 plays, 84 yards, 5:55.**
- KC – Nick Novak 21-yard field goal, 4:38. Chiefs 6–0. **Drive: 7 plays, 23 yards, 3:46.**

**Second quarter**

- DEN – Brandon Marshall 16-yard pass from Jay Cutler (Matt Prater kick), 8:53. Broncos 7–6. **Drive: 8 plays, 62 yards, 3:47.**
- KC – Larry Johnson 1-yard run (Nick Novak kick), 2:43. Chiefs 13–7. **Drive: 2 plays, 2 yards, 0:43.**
- DEN – Matt Prater 56-yard field goal, 0:11. Chiefs 13–10. **Drive: 4 plays, 4 yards, 0:24.**

**Third quarter**

- DEN – Matt Prater 51-yard field goal, 12:13. Tied 13–13. **Drive: 7 plays, 32 yards, 2:47.**
- KC – Nick Novak 43-yard field goal, 8:43. Chiefs 16–13. **Drive: 7 plays, 38 yards, 3:30.**

**Fourth quarter**

- KC – Tony Gonzalez 10-yard pass from Damon Huard (Nick Novak kick), 12:40. Chiefs 23–13. **Drive: 10 plays, 73 yards, 5:46.**
- DEN – Matt Prater 22-yard field goal, 7:58. Chiefs 23–16. **Drive: 15 plays, 75 yards, 4:42.**
- KC – Nick Novak 33-yard field goal, 3:49. Chiefs 26–16. **Drive: 7 plays, 34 yards, 4:09.**
- DEN – Matt Prater 33-yard field goal, 2:06. Chiefs 26–19. **Drive: 8 plays, 39 yards, 1:43.**
- KC – Larry Johnson 16-yard run (Nick Novak kick), 1:37. Chiefs 33–19. **Drive: 3 plays, 43 yards, 0:29.**

**Top passers**

- DEN – Jay Cutler – 29/49, 361 yards, TD, 2 INT
- KC – Damon Huard – 21/28, 160 yards, TD

**Top rushers**

- DEN – Selvin Young – 11 rushes, 49 yards
- KC – Larry Johnson – 28 rushes, 198 yards, 2 TD

**Top receivers**

- DEN – Eddie Royal – 9 receptions, 104 yards
- KC – Dwayne Bowe – 7 receptions, 85 yards

The Chiefs hosted the 3–0 Broncos in hopes of winning their first game of the season. The Chiefs' offense, averaging fewer than 11 points a game, turned early touchdown opportunities into short field goals.

In its first two possessions, Denver's league-leading offense had a turnover, a sack and a shanked punt. Larry Johnson ran a career-long 65-yard run to the 21 yard line on the game's second play. Kansas City had first-and-goal from the 9, but only managed a field goal. The field goal gave Kansas City their first lead in 22 quarters, since the team's lead against the Titans on December 16, 2007.

With QB Damon Huard at the helm, the Chiefs' offense allowed no turnovers and scored more points in one game (33) than their first three games of the season combined (32). Denver's running defense was noticeably weak and allowed Chiefs RB Larry Johnson to run for 198 yards. Johnson also tallied his first 2 touchdown game in over two years. Denver allowed four turnovers, which the Chiefs capitalized on three. Chiefs TE Tony Gonzalez scored one touchdown and finished the game within three yards shy of tying Shannon Sharpe's all-time receiving record (10,060).

The win was Kansas City's first since a victory over Oakland on October 21, 2007. Johnson tallied his 29th career 100-yard rushing game and his fifth against Denver.

==== Week 5: at Carolina Panthers ====
Week 5: Kansas City Chiefs at Carolina Panthers – Game summary

Quarter	1	2	3	4	Total
Chiefs	0	0	0	0	**0**
**Panthers**	7	14	10	3	**34**

at Bank of America Stadium, Charlotte, North Carolina

- Date: October 5
- Game time: 1:00 p.m. EDT/12:00 p.m. CDT
- Game weather: Sunny, 80 °F (27 °C)
- Game attendance: 72,319
- Referee: Terry McAulay
- TV announcers (CBS): Kevin Harlan and Rich Gannon
- Recap, Game Book

Game information

**First quarter**

- CAR – DeAngelo Williams 10-yard run (John Kasay kick), 5:10. Panthers 7–0. **Drive: 7 plays, 46 yards, 3:41.**

**Second quarter**

- CAR – DeAngelo Williams 25-yard pass from Jake Delhomme (John Kasay kick), 9:51. Panthers 14–0. **Drive: 7 plays, 80 yards, 3:17.**
- CAR – DeAngelo Williams 32-yard run (John Kasay kick), 0:26. Panthers 21–0. **Drive: 11 plays, 83 yards, 6:07.**

**Third quarter**

- CAR – John Kasay 32-yard field goal, 10:14. Panthers 24–0. **Drive: 4 plays, 9 yards, 2:05.**
- CAR – Muhsin Muhammad 47-yard pass from Jake Delhomme (John Kasay kick), 2:31. Panthers 31–0. **Drive: 3 plays, 52 yards, 1:34.**

**Fourth quarter**

- CAR – John Kasay 43-yard field goal, 12:26. Panthers 34–0. **Drive: 6 plays, 40 yards, 2:50.**

**Top passers**

- KC – Damon Huard – 10/21, 85 yards, 2 INT
- CAR – Jake Delhomme – 14/22, 236 yards, 2 TD, INT

**Top rushers**

- KC – Jamaal Charles – 4 rushes, 18 yards
- CAR – DeAngelo Williams – 20 rushes, 123 yards, 2 TD

**Top receivers**

- KC – Dwayne Bowe – 5 receptions, 57 yards
- CAR – Steve Smith – 6 receptions, 96 yards

Coming off their stunning home win over the Broncos, the Chiefs flew to Bank of America Stadium for a Week 5 interconference duel with the Carolina Panthers. In the first quarter, Kansas City trailed as RB DeAngelo Williams got a 10-yard TD run. In the second quarter, the Chiefs continued to trail as Williams caught a 25-yard TD pass from QB Jake Delhomme, along with getting a 32-yard TD run. In the third quarter, Carolina kicker John Kasay made a 32-yard field goal, along with Delhomme completing a 47-yard TD pass to WR Muhsin Muhammad. In the fourth quarter, the Panthers sealed the win with Kasay nailing a 43-yard field goal. TE Tony Gonzalez (3 receptions for 17 yards) became the NFL's all-time leader in career receiving yards for a tight end with 10,063 yards.

With the shutout loss, the Chiefs fell to 1–4.

==== Bye Week: Gonzalez and Johnson controversies ====
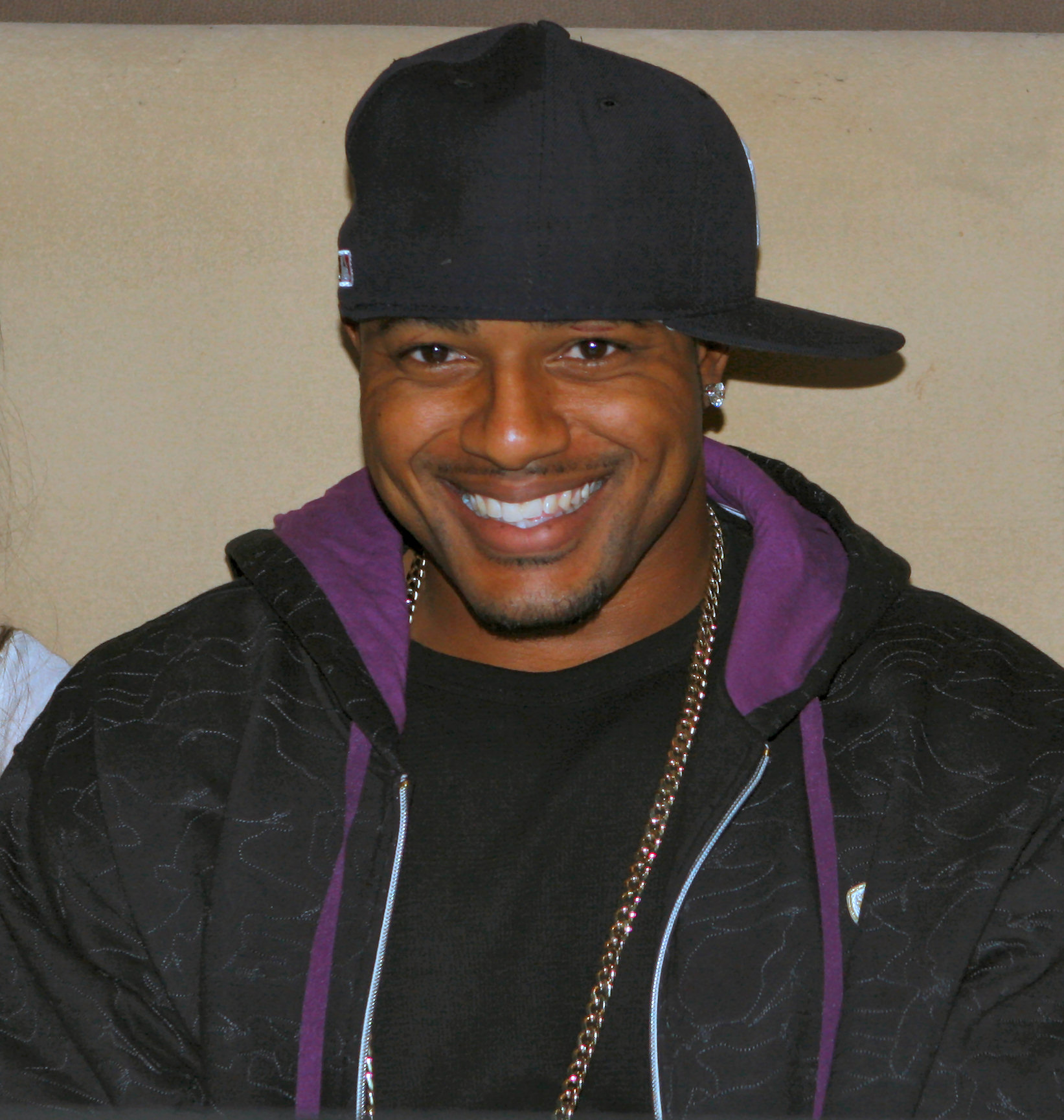
Larry Johnson's legal troubles became public knowledge during the Chiefs' bye week.

TE Tony Gonzalez met with Chiefs GM Carl Peterson during the bye week and inquired about a trade to a playoff contender. Gonzalez, who had always said he would like to end his career with the Chiefs, voiced his desire to play for a Super Bowl contending team and the rebuilding Chiefs would like to acquire extra draft picks. Buffalo, Atlanta, Green Bay, Philadelphia, and the New York Giants had been in contact with the Chiefs regarding Gonzalez. The Giants were considered to be the front-runners, but showed "lukewarm" interest. The Packers offered a third round draft choice, but the deal was not finalized, and Gonzalez remained with the Chiefs after the trading deadline passed.

RB Larry Johnson was charged with simple assault for allegedly pushing a woman at a Kansas City nightclub in February, the third time he has faced assault charges against a woman. Johnson was also reportedly offered by the Chiefs for a trade. Days later, coach Herm Edwards ruled Johnson out of the Chiefs' upcoming game against Tennessee as a result of a violation of team rules. Edwards stated that it was not in response to Johnson's legal troubles, but instead of insubordination.

Days later, reports surfaced that Johnson was under investigation for allegedly telling a woman that he was going to kill her boyfriend then spat in her face at Kansas City's Club Blonde on October 10, just four days prior to his court hearing for a separate incident. Johnson's pattern of behavior could lead to a possible suspension under the NFL's personal conduct policy. Johnson made a public apology on October 22. As a result of his October 10 incident, Johnson was de-activated for the Chiefs' game against the New York Jets. As a result, Johnson was charged with simple assault for the second time in two weeks. The Chiefs indicated that Johnson would meet with NFL commissioner Roger Goodell and would not play "for the foreseeable future." Goodell subsequently suspended Johnson for the Chiefs' Week 10 game against the Chargers.

==== Week 7: vs. Tennessee Titans ====
Week 7: Tennessee Titans at Kansas City Chiefs – Game summary

Quarter	1	2	3	4	Total
**Titans**	10	7	3	14	**34**
Chiefs	0	0	0	10	**10**

at Arrowhead Stadium, Kansas City, Missouri

- Date: October 19
- Game time: 12:00 p.m. CDT
- Game weather: Sunny, 63 °F (17 °C)
- Game attendance: 74,200
- Referee: Gene Steratore
- TV announcers (CBS): Gus Johnson and Steve Tasker
- Recap, Game Book

Game information

**First quarter**

- TEN – Rob Bironas 49-yard field goal, 7:15. Titans 3–0. **Drive: 9 plays, 84 yards, 5:55.**
- TEN – LenDale White 6-yard run (Rob Bironas kick), 2:16. Titans 10–0. **Drive: 6 plays, 53 yards, 2:37.**

**Second quarter**

- TEN – LenDale White 2-yard run (Rob Bironas kick), 1:23. Titans 17–0. **Drive: 9 plays, 80 yards, 4:14.**

**Third quarter**

- TEN – Rob Bironas 46-yard field goal, 0:20. Titans 20–0. **Drive: 8 plays, 31 yards, 3:51.**

**Fourth quarter**

- TEN – LenDale White 80-yard run (Rob Bironas kick), 7:45. Titans 27–0. **Drive: 3 plays, 91 yards, 1:34.**
- KC – Nick Novak 26-yard field goal, 4:56. Titans 27–3. **Drive: 7 plays, 37 yards, 2:49.**
- TEN – Chris Johnson 66-yard run (Rob Bironas kick), 4:01. Titans 34–3. **Drive: 2 plays, 69 yards, 0:55.**
- KC – Tyler Thigpen 14-yard run (Nick Novak kick), 2:37. Titans 34–10. **Drive: 5 plays, 54 yards, 1:24.**

**Top passers**

- TEN – Kerry Collins – 11/18, 123 yards
- KC – Damon Huard – 9/16, 96 yards

**Top rushers**

- TEN – Chris Johnson – 18 rushes, 168 yards, TD
- KC – Tyler Thigpen – 3 rushes, 21 yards, TD

**Top receivers**

- TEN – Bo Scaife – 3 receptions, 48 yards
- KC – Tony Gonzalez – 6 receptions, 97 yards

Coming off their bye week, the Chiefs went home for a Week 7 duel with the undefeated Tennessee Titans. In the first quarter, Kansas City trailed early as Titans kicker Rob Bironas got a 49-yard field goal, along with RB LenDale White getting a 6-yard TD run. In the second quarter, Tennessee increased its lead with White getting a 2-yard TD run. In the third quarter, the Chiefs continued to struggle as Bironas got a 46-yard field goal. In the fourth quarter, the Titans began to put the game out of reach as White got an 80-yard TD run. Kansas City would finally get on the board as kicker Nick Novak got a 26-yard field goal. Tennessee would seal the win as RB Chris Johnson got a 66-yard TD run. The Chiefs would end the game with QB Tyler Thigpen getting a 14-yard TD run.

With the loss, Kansas City fell to 1–5.

During the game starting QB Brodie Croyle (9/10 for 63 yards) suffered a sprained knee in the second quarter. Also, veteran QB Damon Huard (9/16 for 96 yards) later left the game in the fourth with an injured thumb. Both would be placed on injured reserve, ending their seasons.

==== Implementing the spread offense ====
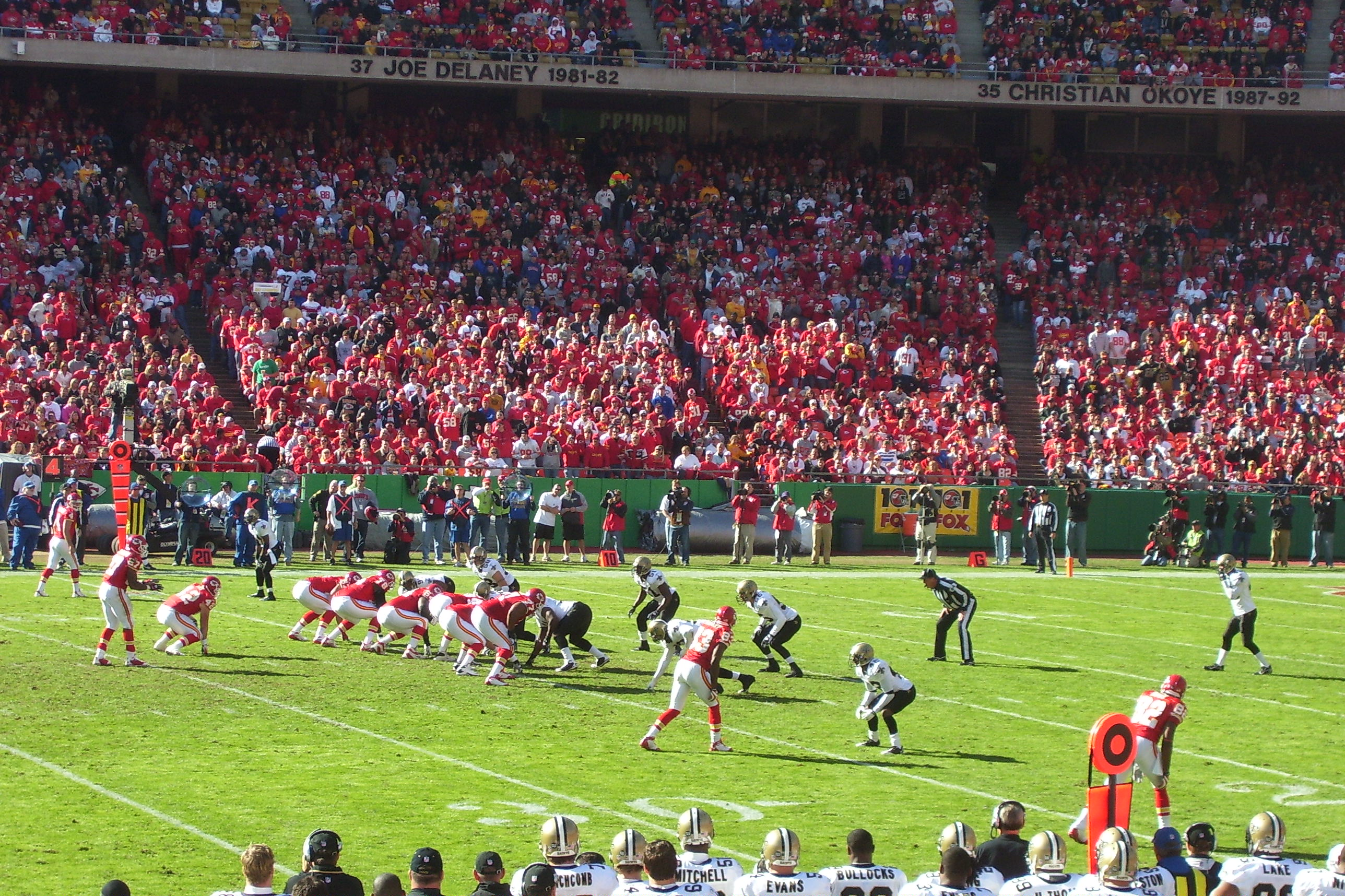
Chan Gailey implemented a new offense based almost entirely on spread and wildcat formations. Against the Saints, RB Larry Johnson lines up as the quarterback.

To help Tyler Thigpen prepare for the game against the Jets, the Chiefs implemented the spread offense to help Thigpen and the rest of the younger players play to the best of their abilities, and also following the absence of RB Larry Johnson due to suspension. The Chiefs made a huge gamble by doing so, as most in the NFL believe that a spread offense cannot work in professional football, and also head coach Herman Edwards was traditionally in favor of more conservative, run-oriented game plans. Prior to the Chiefs implementing the spread offense, Thigpen had been playing erratically with the Chiefs, and he suddenly became poised and effective running the new offense.

==== Week 8: at New York Jets ====
Week 8: Kansas City Chiefs at New York Jets – Game summary

Quarter	1	2	3	4	Total
Chiefs	0	14	3	7	**24**
**Jets**	7	7	7	7	**28**

at Giants Stadium, East Rutherford, New Jersey

- Date: October 26
- Game time: 1:00 p.m. EDT/12:00 p.m. CDT
- Game weather: Clear, 59 °F (15 °C)
- Game attendance: 78,037
- Referee: Pete Morelli
- TV announcers (CBS): Greg Gumbel and Dan Dierdorf
- Recap, Game Book

Game information

**First quarter**

- NYJ – Leon Washington 18-yard pass from Brett Favre (Jay Feely kick), 8:50. Jets 7–0. **Drive: 10 plays, 73 yards, 6:10.**

**Second quarter**

- KC – Tony Gonzalez 19-yard pass from Tyler Thigpen (Connor Barth kick), 13:51. Tied 7–7. **Drive: 4 plays, 38 yards, 1:13.**
- NYJ – Leon Washington 60-yard run (Jay Feely kick), 1:48. Jets 14–7. **Drive: 4 plays, 90 yards, 0:46.**
- KC – Mark Bradley 11-yard pass from Tyler Thigpen (Connor Barth kick), 0:04. Tied 14–14. **Drive: 9 plays, 74 yards, 1:44.**

**Third quarter**

- KC – Connor Barth 30-yard field goal, 9:51. Chiefs 17–14. **Drive: 12 plays, 66 yards, 5:09.**
- NYJ – Thomas Jones 1-yard run (Jay Feely kick), 0:48. Jets 21–17. **Drive: 13 plays, 72 yards, 6:12.**

**Fourth quarter**

- KC – Brandon Flowers 91-yard interception return (Connor Barth kick), 7:48. Chiefs 24–21.
- NYJ – Laveranues Coles 15-yard pass from Brett Favre (Jay Feely kick), 1:00. Jets 28–24. **Drive: 6 plays, 46 yards, 2:01.**

**Top passers**

- KC – Tyler Thigpen – 25/36, 280 yards, 2 TD
- NYJ – Brett Favre – 28/40, 290 yards, 2 TD, 3 INT

**Top rushers**

- KC – Jamaal Charles – 5 rushes, 45 yards
- NYJ – Leon Washington – 3 rushes, 67 yards, TD

**Top receivers**

- KC – Dwayne Bowe – 6 receptions, 102 yards
- NYJ – Jerricho Cotchery – 9 receptions, 102 yards

Hoping to rebound from their loss to the Titans, the Chiefs flew to The Meadowlands for a Week 8 duel with the New York Jets. Due to the season-ending injuries to QB's Brodie Croyle and Damon Huard, Tyler Thigpen made his second career start. Thigpen became the starting quarterback by default.

In the first quarter, Kansas City trailed early as Jets QB Brett Favre completed an 18-yard TD pass to RB Leon Washington. In the second quarter, the Chiefs tied the game as Thigpen completed a 19-yard TD pass to TE Tony Gonzalez. New York responded with Washington getting a 60-yard TD run, yet Kansas City closed out the half with Thigpen completed an 11-yard TD pass to WR Mark Bradley.

In the third quarter, the Chiefs took the lead as rookie kicker Connor Barth nailed a 30-yard field goal, yet the Jets regained the lead with RB Thomas Jones getting a 1-yard TD run. In the fourth quarter, Kansas City took the lead again as rookie CB Brandon Flowers returned an interception 91 yards for a touchdown. However, New York got the last laugh as Favre completed a 15-yard TD pass to WR Laveranues Coles.

With the loss, the Chiefs fell to 1–6.

==== Week 9: vs. Tampa Bay Buccaneers ====
Week 9: Tampa Bay Buccaneers at Kansas City Chiefs – Game summary

Quarter	1	2	3	4	OT	Total
**Buccaneers**	0	13	0	14	3	**30**
Chiefs	14	10	0	3	0	**27**

at Arrowhead Stadium, Kansas City, Missouri

- Date: November 2
- Game time: 12:00 p.m. CST
- Game weather: Sunny, 69 °F (21 °C)
- Game attendance: 74,045
- Referee: Ed Hochuli
- TV announcers (Fox): Ron Pitts, Tony Boselli and Charissa Thompson
- Recap, Game Book

Game information

**First quarter**

- KC – Dwayne Bowe 7-yard pass from Tyler Thigpen (Connor Barth kick), 8:19. Chiefs 7–0. **Drive: 12 plays, 69 yards, 6:41.**
- KC – Kolby Smith 1-yard run (Connor Barth kick), 4:47. Chiefs 14–0. **Drive: 7 plays, 41 yards, 3:19.**

**Second quarter**

- TB – Matt Bryant 25-yard field goal, 13:04. Chiefs 14–3. **Drive: 13 plays, 68 yards, 6:43.**
- KC – Tyler Thigpen 37-yard pass from Mark Bradley (Connor Barth kick), 10:12. Chiefs 21–3. **Drive: 5 plays, 72 yards, 2:52.**
- KC – Connor Barth 39-yard field goal, 2:13. Chiefs 24–3. **Drive: 5 plays, 47 yards, 1:37.**
- TB – Clifton Smith 97-yard kickoff return (Matt Bryant kick), 2:01. Chiefs 24–10.
- TB – Matt Bryant 39-yard field goal, 0:00. Chiefs 24–13. **Drive: 7 plays, 55 yards, 1:08.**

**Third quarter**

- No scoring plays.

**Fourth quarter**

- TB – Alex Smith 3-yard pass from Earnest Graham (pass failed), 13:36. Chiefs 24–19. **Drive: 1 play, 3 yards, 0:04.**
- KC – Connor Barth 28-yard field goal, 7:38. Chiefs 27–19. **Drive: 10 plays, 71 yards, 5:58.**
- TB – Antonio Bryant 24-yard pass from Jeff Garcia (Jeff Garcia–Alex Smith pass), 0:19. Tied 27–27. **Drive: 5 plays, 50 yards, 1:31.**

**Overtime**

- TB – Matt Bryant 34-yard field goal, 10:24. Buccaneers 30–27. **Drive: 9 plays, 58 yards, 4:36.**

**Top passers**

- TB – Jeff Garcia – 31/43, 339 yards, TD, INT
- KC – Tyler Thigpen – 14/25, 164 yards, TD

**Top rushers**

- TB – Earnest Graham – 19 rushes, 62 yards
- KC – Jamaal Charles – 18 rushes, 106 yards

**Top receivers**

- TB – Antonio Bryant – 8 receptions, 115 yards, TD
- KC – Mark Bradley – 4 receptions, 65 yards

The game started well for the Chiefs who jumped out to a 24–3 lead, which included a "trick" touchdown pass from Mark Bradley (wide receiver) to Tyler Thigpen (quarterback). The momentum started to change when the Buccaneers ran a punt return for a touchdown and added a late field goal to cut the deficit to a 24–13 margin. In the fourth quarter, Tampa Bay picked up a late touchdown on a fumble to bring the game to a 27–25 deficit. They converted the two-point conversion to tie the game at 27–27. In overtime, the Buccaneers systematically ran the ball to the 30-yard line and then kicked the winning field goal to capture a 30–27 victory. It was the biggest margin they have overcome in their history. The loss was the Chiefs' 16th in the past 17 games.

With their 4th-straight loss, Kansas City fell to 1–7.

==== Week 10: at San Diego Chargers ====
Week 10: Kansas City Chiefs at San Diego Chargers – Game summary

Quarter	1	2	3	4	Total
Chiefs	7	6	0	6	**19**
**Chargers**	0	6	7	7	**20**

at Qualcomm Stadium, San Diego, California

- Date: November 9
- Game time: 3:15 p.m. CST/1:15 p.m. PST
- Game weather: Partly cloudy, 62 °F (17 °C)
- Game attendance: 67,510
- Referee: Ron Winter
- TV announcers (CBS): Gus Johnson and Steve Tasker
- Recap, Game Book

Game information

**First quarter**

- KC – Mark Bradley 30-yard pass from Tyler Thigpen (Connor Barth kick), 3:15. Chiefs 7–0. **Drive: 12 plays, 95 yards, 7:08.**

**Second quarter**

- SD – Nate Kaeding 34-yard field goal, 14:03. Chiefs 7–3. **Drive: 10 plays, 64 yards, 4:12.**
- SD – Nate Kaeding 26-yard field goal, 6:47. Chiefs 7–6. **Drive: 11 plays, 77 yards, 5:33.**
- KC – Tony Gonzalez 34-yard pass from Tyler Thigpen (pass failed), 3:11. Chiefs 13–6. **Drive: 7 plays, 83 yards, 3:36.**

**Third quarter**

- SD – Malcom Floyd 5-yard pass from Philip Rivers (Nate Kaeding kick), 3:43. Tied 13–13. **Drive: 8 plays, 58 yards, 4:14.**

**Fourth quarter**

- SD – Antonio Gates 8-yard pass from Philip Rivers (Nate Kaeding kick), 6:55. Chargers 20–13. **Drive: 14 plays, 94 yards, 8:28.**
- KC – Tony Gonzalez 3-yard pass from Tyler Thigpen (pass failed), 0:23. Chargers 20–19. **Drive: 14 plays, 60 yards, 2:37.**

**Top passers**

- KC – Tyler Thigpen – 27/41, 266 yards, 3 TD
- SD – Philip Rivers – 27/36, 316 yards, 2 TD, 2 INT

**Top rushers**

- KC – Dantrell Savage – 12 rushes, 44 yards
- SD – LaDainian Tomlinson – 22 rushes, 78 yards

**Top receivers**

- KC – Tony Gonzalez – 10 receptions, 113 yards, 2 TD
- SD – Vincent Jackson – 5 receptions, 83 yards

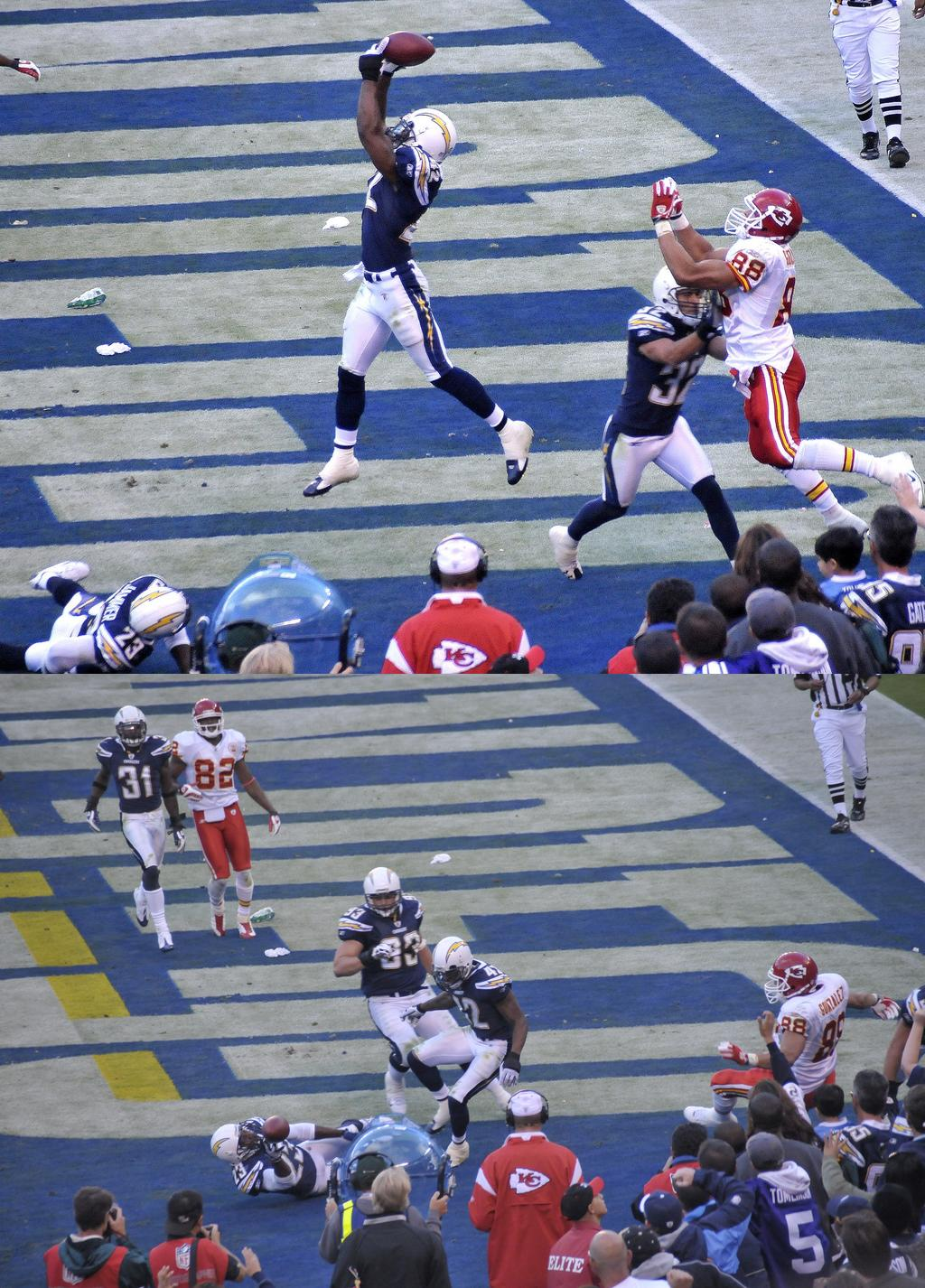
San Diego Chargers' Clinton Hart stops the Chiefs' last attempt at winning the game, knocking the ball into Quentin Jammer's arms

The Chiefs took an early lead on a 30-yard pass from Tyler Thigpen to Mark Bradley. The Chiefs defense continued to show improvement in the red zone, limiting the Chargers to two field goals instead of two touchdowns. At the end of the first half, Thigpen threw a pass to 34 yard touchdown pass to Tony Gonzalez. However, the extra point snap was botched and an attempt at a quick pass failed.

The Chargers controlled the second half better than the first, scoring two touchdowns and leading the Chiefs by 7 at the end of the fourth quarter. The Chiefs' final drive ended with a 3-yard touchdown pass to Gonzalez. A 1-point PAT would tie the game. However, Herm Edwards told Thigpen to go for two, explaining in a post-game interview that the defense was too beat up for overtime play. The resulting two-point conversion ended in an incomplete pass. The Chiefs lost by one point.

With the loss, Kansas City fell to 1–8.

==== Week 11: vs. New Orleans Saints ====
Week 11: New Orleans Saints at Kansas City Chiefs – Game summary

Quarter	1	2	3	4	Total
**Saints**	3	10	14	3	**30**
Chiefs	7	3	3	7	**20**

at Arrowhead Stadium, Kansas City, Missouri

- Date: November 16
- Game time: 12:00 p.m. CST
- Game weather: Sunny and breezy, 53 °F (12 °C)
- Game attendance: 74,159
- Referee: John Parry
- TV announcers (Fox): Thom Brennaman and Brian Billick
- Recap, Game Book

Game information

**First quarter**

- KC – Dwayne Bowe 6-yard pass from Tyler Thigpen (Connor Barth kick), 5:31. Chiefs 7–0. **Drive: 9 plays, 47 yards, 4:52.**
- NO – Garrett Hartley 30-yard field goal, 0:29. Chiefs 7–3. **Drive: 9 plays, 32 yards, 5:02.**

**Second quarter**

- NO – Deuce McAllister 1-yard run (Garrett Hartley kick), 11:23. Saints 10–7. **Drive: 7 plays, 43 yards, 3:29.**
- KC – Connor Barth 20-yard field goal, 3:31. Tied 10–10. **Drive: 14 plays, 78 yards, 7:52.**
- NO – Garrett Hartley 23-yard field goal, 0:00. Saints 13–10. **Drive: 12 plays, 62 yards, 3:31.**

**Third quarter**

- NO – Lance Moore 47-yard pass from Drew Brees (Garrett Hartley kick), 13:53. Saints 20–10. **Drive: 2 plays, 52 yards, 0:12.**
- KC – Connor Barth 21-yard field goal, 7:41. Saints 20–13. **Drive: 13 plays, 72 yards, 6:12.**
- NO – Pierre Thomas 1-yard run (Garrett Hartley kick), 3:15. Saints 27–13. **Drive: 10 plays, 76 yards, 4:26.**

**Fourth quarter**

- KC – Dwayne Bowe 5-yard pass from Tyler Thigpen (Connor Barth kick), 13:54. Saints 27–20. **Drive: 9 plays, 70 yards, 4:21.**
- NO – Garrett Hartley 35-yard field goal, 3:28. Saints 30–20. **Drive: 12 plays, 71 yards, 6:27.**

**Top passers**

- NO – Drew Brees – 25/36, 266 yards, TD, INT
- KC – Tyler Thigpen – 19/38, 235 yards, 2 TD, INT

**Top rushers**

- NO – Pierre Thomas – 16 rushes, 88 yards, TD
- KC – Larry Johnson – 19 rushes, 67 yards

**Top receivers**

- NO – Lance Moore – 8 receptions, 102 yards, TD
- KC – Mark Bradley – 3 receptions, 54 yards

Hoping to snap their five-game losing streak, the Chiefs went home for a Week 11 interconference duel with the New Orleans Saints. In the first quarter, Kansas City struck first as QB Tyler Thigpen completed a 6-yard TD pass to WR Dwayne Bowe. The Saints would respond with kicker Garrett Hartley getting a 30-yard field goal. In the second quarter, New Orleans took the lead as RB Deuce McAllister got a 1-yard TD run. The Chiefs would answer with rookie kicker Connor Barth getting a 20-yard field goal. The Saints closed out the half with Hartley making a 23-yard field goal.

In the third quarter, New Orleans increased their lead with QB Drew Brees completing a 47-yard TD pass to WR Lance Moore. Kansas City replied with Barth making a 21-yard field goal, yet the Saints answered with RB Pierre Thomas getting a 1-yard TD run. In the fourth quarter, the Chiefs tried to rally as Thigpen hooked up with Bowe again on a 5-yard TD pass. However, New Orleans pulled away with Hartley nailing a 35-yard field goal.

With their sixth-straight loss, Kansas City fell to 1–9. As of 2024, this marks Kansas City's last loss to New Orleans.

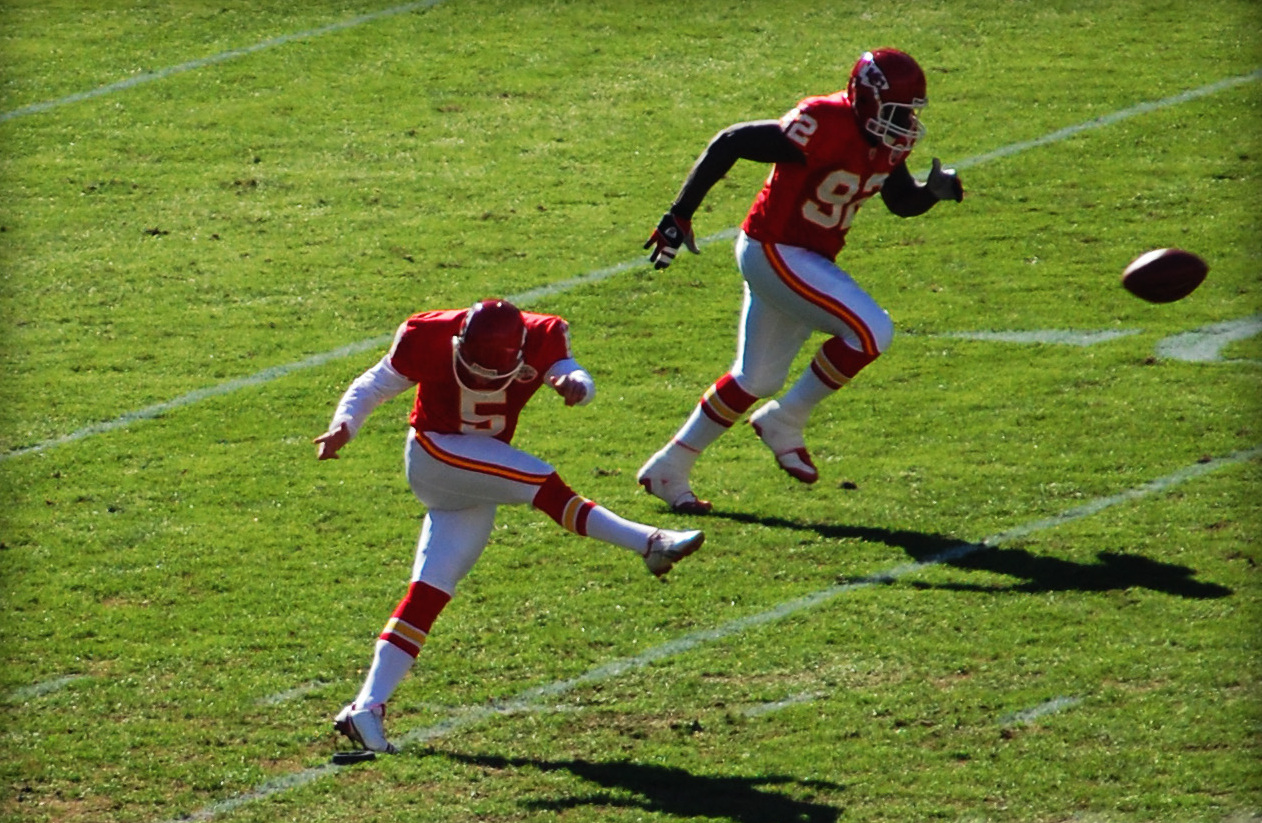
Connor Barth kicks off against New Orleans; Wallace Gilberry in background

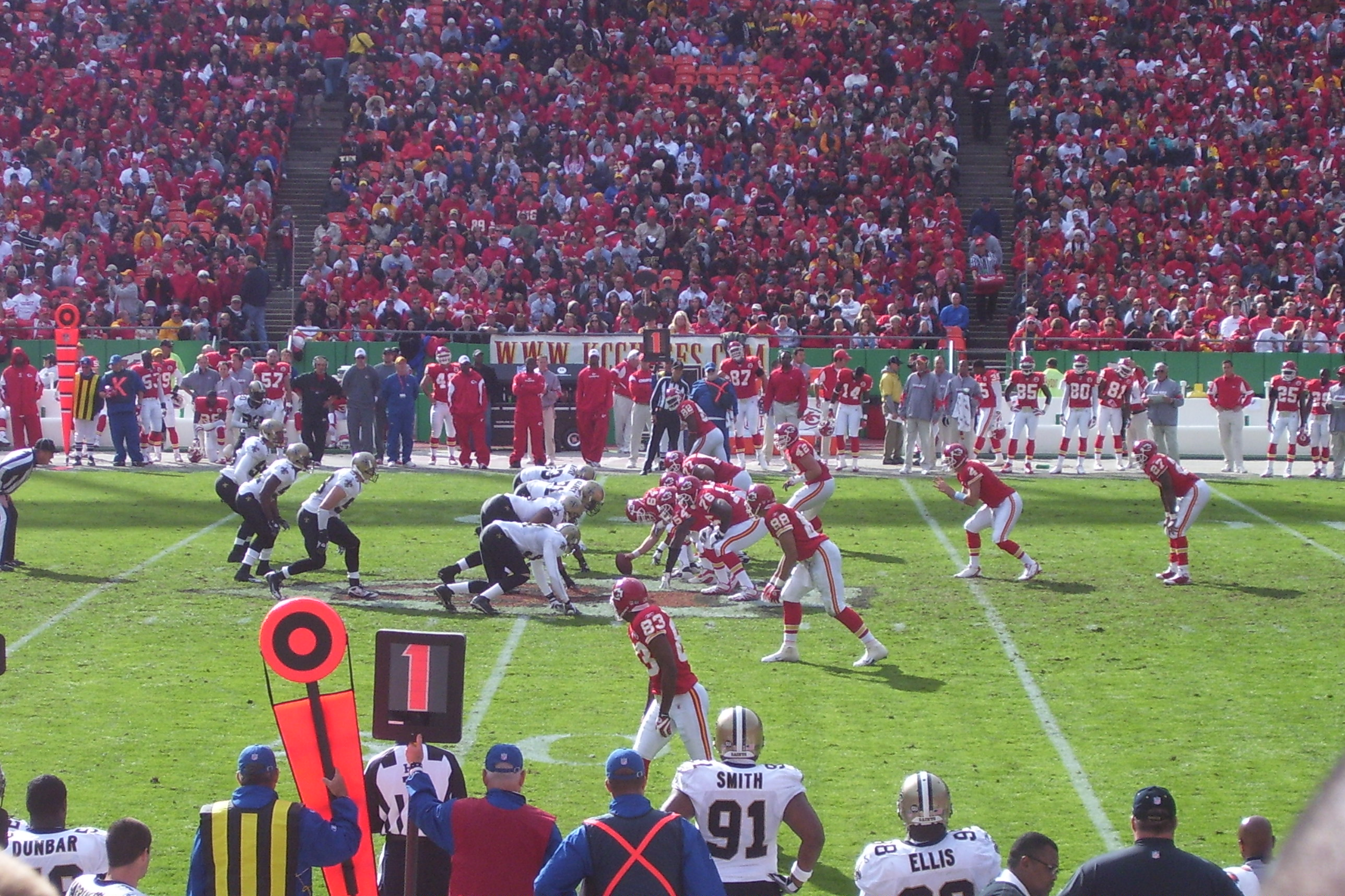
Tyler Thigpen leads the Chiefs' offense in a shotgun formation

==== Week 12: vs. Buffalo Bills ====
Week 12: Buffalo Bills at Kansas City Chiefs – Game summary

Quarter	1	2	3	4	Total
**Bills**	7	23	17	7	**54**
Chiefs	7	10	7	7	**31**

at Arrowhead Stadium, Kansas City, Missouri

- Date: November 23
- Game time: 12:00 p.m. CST
- Game weather: Mostly sunny, 50 °F (10 °C)
- Game attendance: 73,584
- Referee: Bill Leavy
- TV announcers (CBS): Ian Eagle and Solomon Wilcots
- Recap, Game Book

Game information

**First quarter**

- KC – Jamaal Charles 36-yard pass from Tyler Thigpen (Connor Barth kick), 11:15. Chiefs 7–0. **Drive: 7 plays, 80 yards, 3:45.**
- BUF – Marshawn Lynch 1-yard run (Rian Lindell kick), 6:42. Tied 7–7. **Drive: 9 plays, 61 yards, 4:33.**

**Second quarter**

- BUF – Rian Lindell 21-yard field goal, 14:58. Bills 10–7. **Drive: 10 plays, 37 yards, 5:48.**
- KC – Tony Gonzalez 2-yard pass from Tyler Thigpen (Connor Barth kick), 13:15. Chiefs 14–10. **Drive: 3 plays, 72 yards, 1:43.**
- BUF – Rian Lindell 39-yard field goal, 7:53. Chiefs 14–13. **Drive: 4 plays, 7 yards, 1:00.**
- BUF – Leodis McKelvin 64-yard interception return (Rian Lindell kick), 7:11. Bills 20–14.
- KC – Connor Barth 45-yard field goal, 3:22. Bills 20–17. **Drive: 6 plays, 39 yards, 3:49.**
- BUF – Rian Lindell 34-yard field goal, 1:33. Bills 23–17. **Drive: 5 plays, 53 yards, 1:49.**
- BUF – Trent Edwards 15-yard run (Rian Lindell kick), 0:04. Bills 30–17. **Drive: 5 plays, 53 yards, 1:16.**

**Third quarter**

- BUF – Trent Edwards 5-yard run (Rian Lindell kick), 12:32. Bills 37–17. **Drive: 4 plays, 33 yards, 2:28.**
- BUF – Rian Lindell 38-yard field goal, 10:05. Bills 40–17. **Drive: 4 plays, 7 yards, 1:24.**
- KC – Mark Bradley 45-yard pass from Tyler Thigpen (Connor Barth kick), 7:53. Bills 40–24. **Drive: 5 plays, 68 yards, 2:12.**
- BUF – Josh Reed 8-yard pass from Trent Edwards (Rian Lindell kick), 2:58. Bills 47–24. **Drive: 9 plays, 83 yards, 4:55.**

**Fourth quarter**

- BUF – Derek Schouman 17-yard pass from Trent Edwards (Rian Lindell kick), 9:18. Bills 54–24. **Drive: 3 plays, 44 yards, 1:22.**
- KC – Dwayne Bowe 3-yard pass from Quinn Gray (Connor Barth kick), 2:23. Bills 54–31. **Drive: 7 plays, 71 yards, 2:15.**

**Top passers**

- BUF – Trent Edwards – 24/32, 273 yards, 2 TD
- KC – Tyler Thigpen – 17/31, 240 yards, 3 TD, 2 INT

**Top rushers**

- BUF – Marshawn Lynch – 20 rushes, 79 yards, TD
- KC – Larry Johnson – 7 rushes, 81 yards

**Top receivers**

- BUF – Lee Evans – 5 receptions, 110 yards
- KC – Tony Gonzalez – 10 receptions, 113 yards, TD

The Chiefs hosted the 5–5 Bills, losers of their past four games, on November 23. Tyler Thigpen had his first bad game in five outings in the Chiefs' 54–31 loss. Thigpen's three turnovers–two interceptions and one lost fumble–led to 20 points by the Bills. Despite the turnovers, Thigpen also threw for 240 yards and three touchdowns.

The 54 points by Buffalo were the Chiefs' most allowed in a game in the franchise's history. With the loss, the Chiefs fell to a 1–10 record, their 19th loss in 20 games, and they were eliminated from playoff contention for the second year.

==== Week 13: at Oakland Raiders ====
Week 13: Kansas City Chiefs at Oakland Raiders – Game summary

Quarter	1	2	3	4	Total
**Chiefs**	3	7	0	10	**20**
Raiders	3	0	7	3	**13**

at Oakland–Alameda County Coliseum, Oakland, California

- Date: November 30
- Game time: 3:15 p.m. CST/1:15 p.m. PST
- Game weather: Partly cloudy, 59 °F (15 °C)
- Game attendance: 61,379
- Referee: Pete Morelli
- TV announcers (CBS): Bill Macatee and Steve Beuerlein
- Recap, Game Book

Game information

**First quarter**

- OAK – Sebastian Janikowski 25-yard field goal, 7:52. Raiders 3–0. **Drive: 8 plays, 80 yards, 3:23.**
- KC – Connor Barth 38-yard field goal, 1:07. Tied 3–3. **Drive: 11 plays, 55 yards, 6:45.**

**Second quarter**

- KC – Maurice Leggett 67-yard fumble return (Connor Barth kick), 11:57. Chiefs 10–3.

**Third quarter**

- OAK – Justin Fargas 1-yard run (Sebastian Janikowski kick), 11:13. Tied 10–10. **Drive: 1 play, 1 yard, 0:03.**

**Fourth quarter**

- KC – Larry Johnson 2-yard run (Connor Barth kick), 13:43. Chiefs 17–10. **Drive: 16 plays, 91 yards, 9:24.**
- KC – Connor Barth 27-yard field goal, 8:54. Chiefs 20–10. **Drive: 7 plays, 30 yards, 4:35.**
- OAK – Sebastian Janikowski 51-yard field goal, 2:55. Chiefs 20–13. **Drive: 11 plays, 46 yards, 2:27.**

**Top passers**

- KC – Tyler Thigpen – 15/22, 162 yards, INT
- OAK – JaMarcus Russell – 10/28, 132 yards

**Top rushers**

- KC – Larry Johnson – 24 rushes, 92 yards, TD
- OAK – Justin Fargas – 18 rushes, 82 yards, TD

**Top receivers**

- KC – Tony Gonzalez – 8 receptions, 110 yards
- OAK – Zach Miller – 5 receptions, 79 yards

The Raiders hosted the Chiefs at Oakland–Alameda County Coliseum on November 30. The game began with both teams exchanging field goals to tie the game at 3. The Raiders lined up to kick another field goal, but instead elected to run a fake field goal, which was fumbled and recovered by Chiefs CB Maurice Leggett and returned for a touchdown. The Chiefs led the game 10–3 at halftime. In the third quarter, the Raiders tied the game at 10 with a touchdown by RB Justin Fargas. With the Chiefs backed up to their own 9 following a punt, QB Tyler Thigpen led the Chiefs's offense down the field and capped the drive with a hand-off to RB Larry Johnson for a 2-yard touchdown. On Oakland's next possession, Justin Fargas fumbled the football which eventually set up a Chiefs field goal. The Raiders attempted to get back in the game with a field goal by K Sebastian Janikowski, but the Chiefs held possession and ran out the clock for the remainder of the game. The Chiefs managed to snap their seven-game losing streak by beating the Raiders 20–13. It was Kansas City's sixth consecutive victory at Oakland–Alameda County Coliseum. The victory was Tyler Thigpen's first as the Chiefs' starting quarterback.

With the win, Kansas City improved to 2–10.

==== Week 14: at Denver Broncos ====
Week 14: Kansas City Chiefs at Denver Broncos – Game summary

Quarter	1	2	3	4	Total
Chiefs	10	7	0	0	**17**
**Broncos**	7	7	3	7	**24**

at Invesco Field at Mile High, Denver, Colorado

- Date: December 7
- Game time: 3:05 p.m. CST/2:05 p.m. MST
- Game weather: Partly cloudy, 64 °F (18 °C)
- Game attendance: 75,187
- Referee: Scott Green
- TV announcers (CBS): Bill Macatee and Steve Beuerlein
- Recap, Game Book

Game information

**First quarter**

- KC – Connor Barth 26-yard field goal, 7:30. Chiefs 3–0. **Drive: 6 plays, 43 yards, 3:39.**
- KC – Maurice Leggett 27-yard interception return (Connor Barth kick), 5:53. Chiefs 10–0.
- DEN – Peyton Hillis 18-yard run (Matt Prater kick), 0:26. Chiefs 10–7. **Drive: 11 plays, 80 yards, 5:27.**

**Second quarter**

- KC – Tony Gonzalez 13-yard pass from Tyler Thigpen (Connor Barth kick), 8:02. Chiefs 17–7. **Drive: 17 plays, 80 yards, 7:24.**
- DEN – Brandon Marshall 12-yard pass from Jay Cutler (Matt Prater kick), 1:05. Chiefs 17–14. **Drive: 14 plays, 80 yards, 6:57.**

**Third quarter**

- DEN – Matt Prater 33-yard field goal, 8:17. Tied 17–17. **Drive: 12 plays, 66 yards, 6:43.**

**Fourth quarter**

- DEN – Brandon Marshall 6-yard pass from Jay Cutler (Matt Prater kick), 10:10. Broncos 24–17. **Drive: 12 plays, 95 yards, 6:07.**

**Top passers**

- KC – Tyler Thigpen – 17/32, 187 yards, TD
- DEN – Jay Cutler – 32/40, 286 yards, 2 TD, INT

**Top rushers**

- KC – Larry Johnson – 11 rushes, 36 yards
- DEN – Peyton Hillis – 8 rushes, 58 yards, TD

**Top receivers**

- KC – Dwayne Bowe – 7 receptions, 96 yards
- DEN – Brandon Marshall – 11 receptions, 91 yards, 2 TD

Fresh off their divisional road win over the Raiders, the Chiefs flew to Invesco Field at Mile High for a Week 14 AFC West rematch with the Denver Broncos. In the first quarter, Kansas City got the early lead as rookie kicker Connor Barth got a 26-yard field goal, while rookie CB Maurice Leggett returned an interception 27 yards for a touchdown. The Broncos would with RB Peyton Hillis getting an 18-yard touchdown run. The Chiefs answered in the second quarter with QB Tyler Thigpen completing a 13-yard touchdown pass to TE Tony Gonzalez, yet Denver closed out the half with QB Jay Cutler completing a 12-yard touchdown pass to WR Brandon Marshall.

In the third quarter, the Broncos tied the game with kicker Matt Prater nailing a 33-yard field goal. In the fourth quarter, Denver took the lead as Cutler hooked up with Marshall again on a 6-yard touchdown pass. Kansas City tried to rally, but the Broncos' defense was too much to overcome.

With the loss, the Chiefs fell to 2–11.

==== Week 15: vs. San Diego Chargers ====
Week 15: San Diego Chargers at Kansas City Chiefs – Game summary

Quarter	1	2	3	4	Total
**Chargers**	0	3	7	12	**22**
Chiefs	7	7	7	0	**21**

at Arrowhead Stadium, Kansas City, Missouri

- Date: December 14
- Game time: 12:00 p.m. CST
- Game weather: Cloudy, 36 °F (2 °C)
- Game attendance: 73,842
- Referee: Carl Cheffers
- TV announcers (CBS): Ian Eagle and Solomon Wilcots
- Recap, Game Book

Game information

**First quarter**

- KC – Tony Gonzalez 4-yard pass from Larry Johnson (Connor Barth kick), 4:59. Chiefs 7–0. **Drive: 15 plays, 96 yards, 7:56.**

**Second quarter**

- KC – Dwayne Bowe 1-yard pass from Tyler Thigpen (Connor Barth kick), 2:53. Chiefs 14–0. **Drive: 9 plays, 54 yards, 5:09.**
- SD – Nate Kaeding 32-yard field goal, 0:11. Chiefs 14–3. **Drive: 8 plays, 38 yards, 2:42.**

**Third quarter**

- KC – Tyler Thigpen 3-yard run (Connor Barth kick), 12:35. Chiefs 21–3. **Drive: 1 play, 3 yards, 0:04.**
- SD – LaDainian Tomlinson 6-yard run (Nate Kaeding kick), 8:29. Chiefs 21–10. **Drive: 10 plays, 65 yards, 4;06.**

**Fourth quarter**

- SD – Malcom Floyd 4-yard pass from Philip Rivers (pass failed), 1:13. Chiefs 21–16. **Drive: 15 plays, 89 yards, 3:42.**
- SD – Vincent Jackson 10-yard pass from Philip Rivers (pass failed), 0:36. Chargers 22–21. **Drive: 4 plays, 61 yards, 0:37.**

**Top passers**

- SD – Philip Rivers – 34/48, 346 yards, 2 TD, INT
- KC – Tyler Thigpen – 19/28, 171 yards, TD, INT

**Top rushers**

- SD – LaDainian Tomlinson – 15 rushes, 39 yards, TD
- KC – Larry Johnson – 17 rushes, 55 yards

**Top receivers**

- SD – Vincent Jackson – 6 receptions, 89 yards, TD
- KC – Tony Gonzalez – 6 receptions, 62 yards, TD

The Chiefs hosted the 5–8 Chargers on December 14, hoping to end their slim playoff chances. Temperatures which hovered in the low 60s when early-arriving fans first showed up plunged into the 20s by the end of the game. The Chiefs dominated the game early, leading 14–3 at halftime. Chiefs quarterback Tyler Thigpen threw for one touchdown and ran for another for the Chiefs and was 19-for-28 for 171 yards.

The Chargers had three turnovers and, perhaps more embarrassing, gave up three sacks to the NFL's worst pass rush. Tamba Hali had two sacks and caused two fumbles for a Chiefs defense that hadn't gotten a sack since playing San Diego four games ago. The three sacks pushed Kansas City's season total to a league-low nine, and the Chiefs need five in their last two games to avoid tying the NFL record for fewest in a season. Five of the sacks from the season have come against San Diego.

Leading into the fourth quarter, Kansas City led 21–10, but allowed 11 points in the final 79 seconds of the game to lose 22–21. The Chiefs, despite having an 18-point lead, used up all three time-outs. The victory sealed a season sweep for San Diego over Kansas City, with both victories ending in a one-point margin.

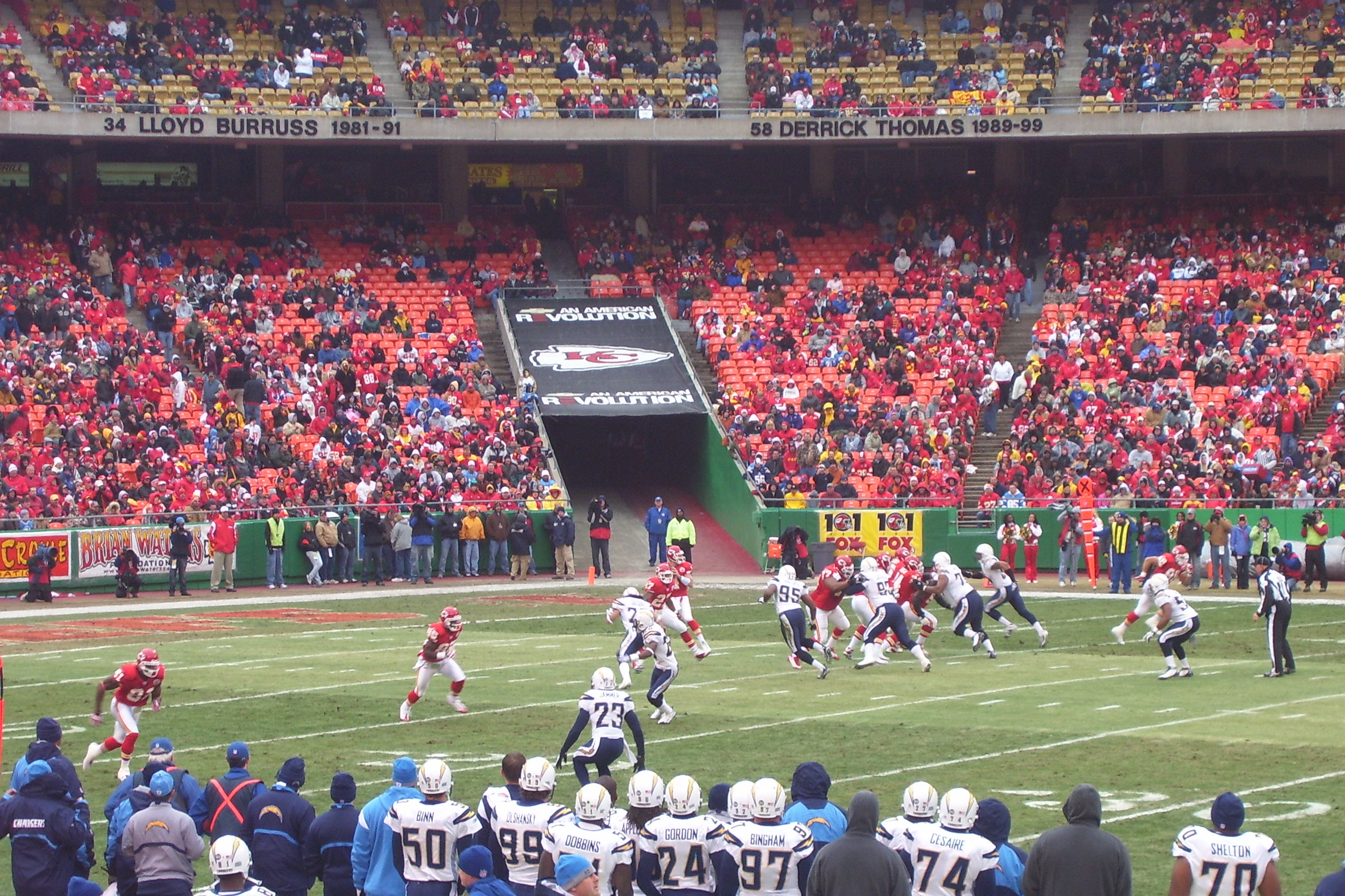
Action in the week 15 clash

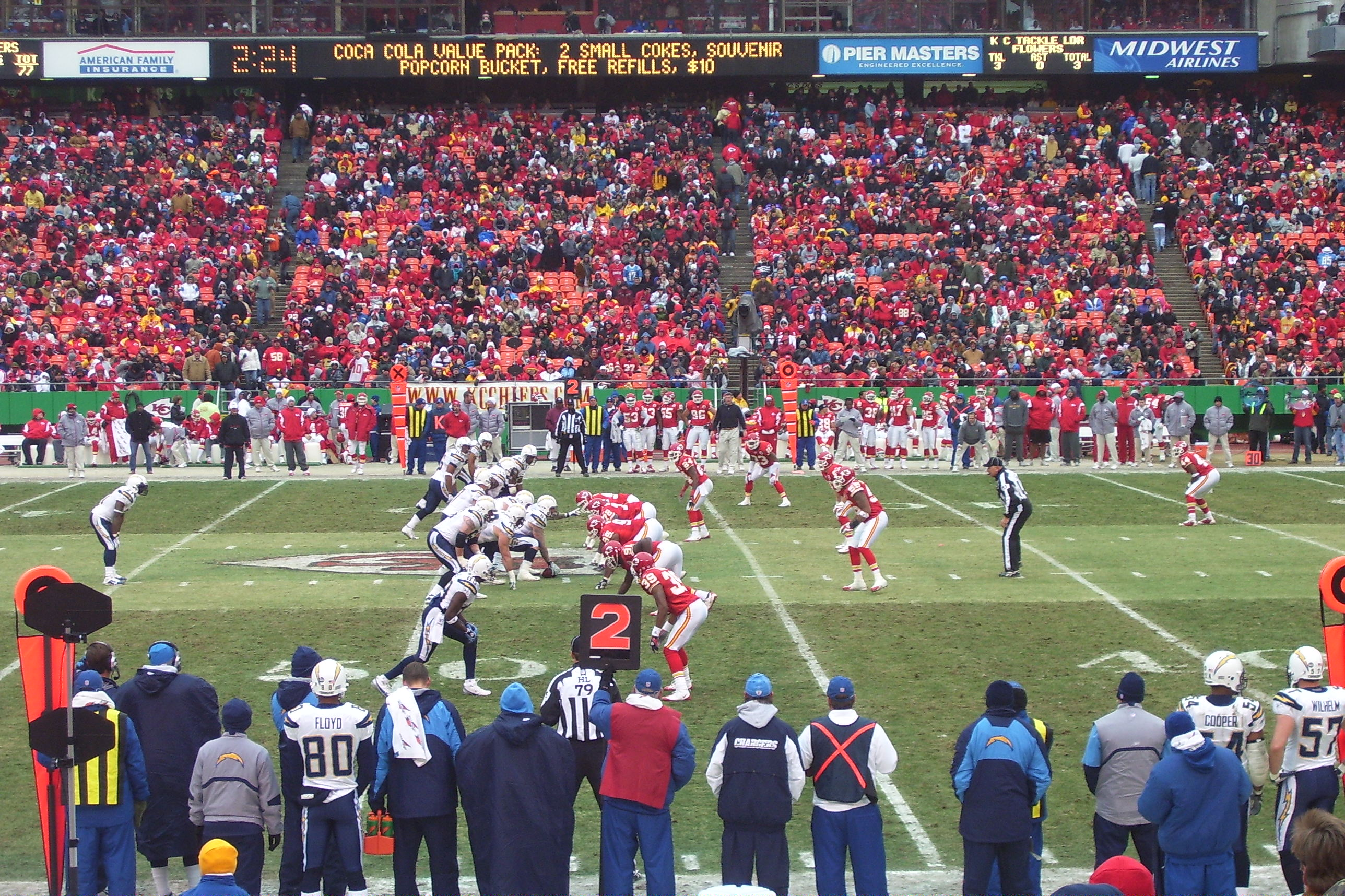
The Chiefs' defense takes on the Chargers offense

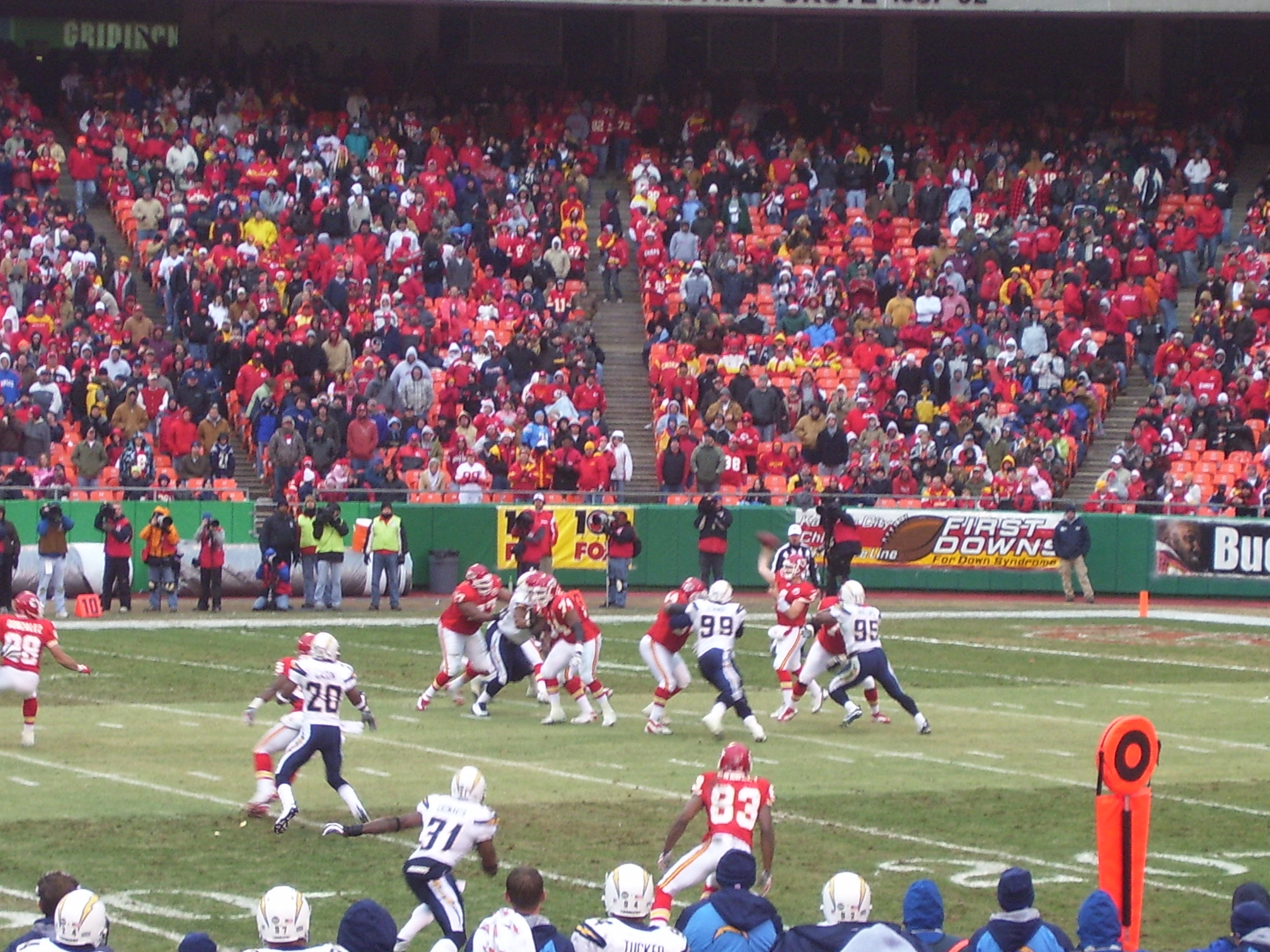
A passing play by Kansas City

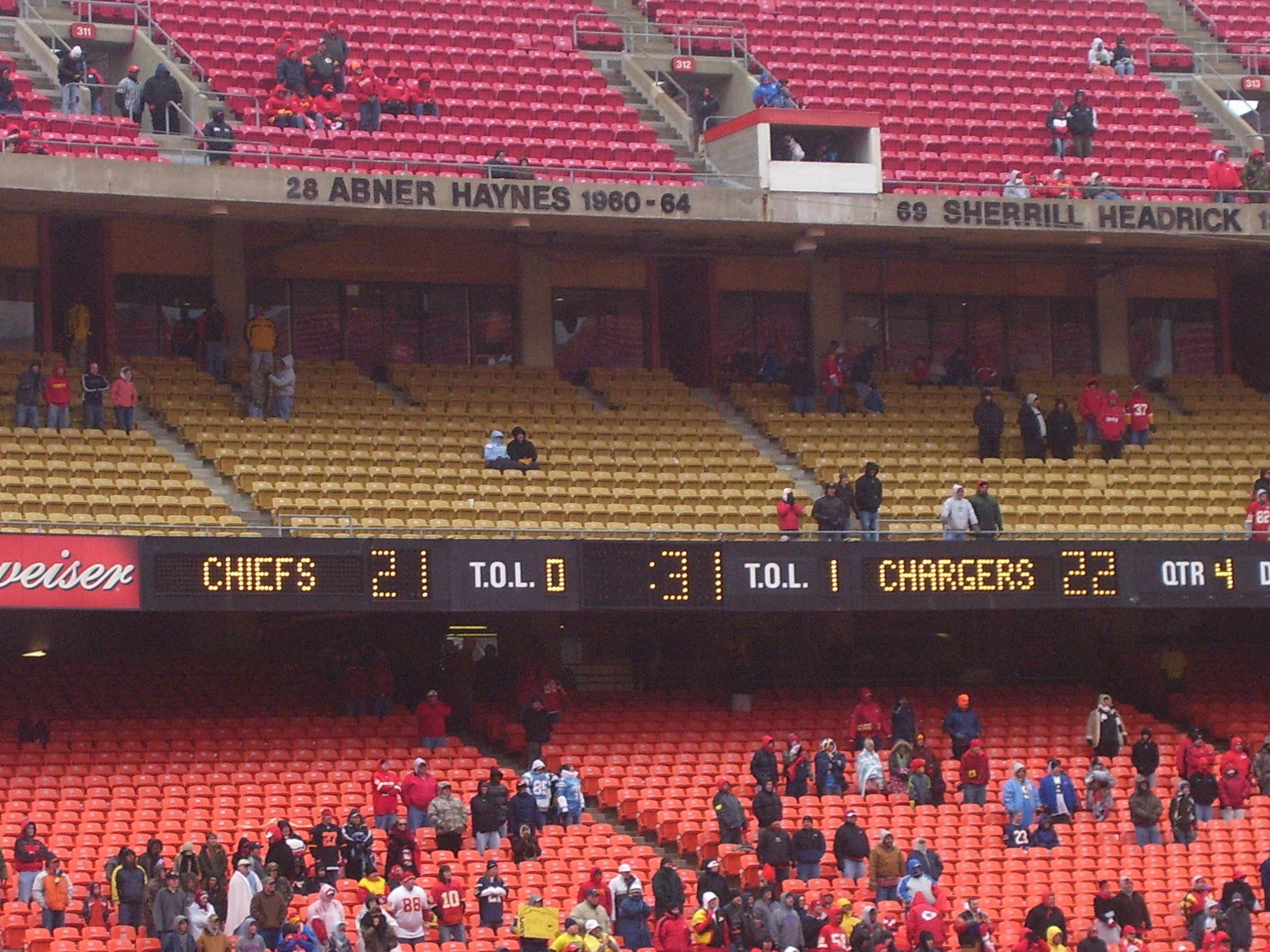
Although the announced attendance was 73,842, Arrowhead Stadium was noticeably empty throughout most of the game

==== Resignation of Carl Peterson ====
The day after the Chiefs' loss to San Diego, Chiefs owner Clark Hunt announced the resignation of Carl Peterson from all positions held (general manager, vice president, and chief executive officer) effective at the end of the season.

The official press release stated that Peterson resigned, but Hunt had said the conversation had been on-going throughout the season. Hunt said his decision to relieve Peterson of duties was not based on what happened the previous day, when the Chiefs lost an 11-point lead in the final 73 seconds and were beaten 22–21 by San Diego, dropping their record to 2–12. Hunt also said that the fate of head coach Herman Edwards would be settled after the season. Hunt said he would split the duties previously held by Peterson and have someone in charge of the business side and someone else in charge of football for the franchise. Hunt said he planned on hiring someone from outside the organization.

==== Week 16: vs. Miami Dolphins ====
Week 16: Miami Dolphins at Kansas City Chiefs – Game summary

Quarter	1	2	3	4	Total
**Dolphins**	10	14	7	7	**38**
Chiefs	7	21	3	0	**31**

at Arrowhead Stadium, Kansas City, Missouri

- Date: December 21
- Game time: 12:00 p.m. CST
- Game weather: Sunny, breezy, 10 °F (−12 °C)
- Game attendance: 73,689
- Referee: Jeff Triplette
- TV announcers (CBS): Dick Enberg, Randy Cross and Dan Fouts
- Recap, Game Book

Game information

**First quarter**

- MIA – Ted Ginn 31-yard run (Dan Carpenter kick), 14:42. Dolphins 7–0. **Drive: 1 play, 31 yards, 0:18.**
- MIA – Dan Carpenter 34-yard field goal, 11:43. Dolphins 10–0. **Drive: 4 plays, 2 yards, 1:07.**
- KC – Devard Darling 33-yard pass from Tyler Thigpen (Connor Barth kick), 10:15. Dolphins 10–7. **Drive: 3 plays, 65 yards, 1:28.**

**Second quarter**

- KC – Tony Gonzalez 8-yard pass from Tyler Thigpen (Connor Barth kick), 14:05. Chiefs 14–10. **Drive: 17 plays, 80 yards, 7:47.**
- MIA – David Martin 11-yard pass from Chad Pennington (Dan Carpenter kick), 11:33. Dolphins 17–14. **Drive: 5 plays, 72 yards, 2:32.**
- KC – Larry Johnson 2-yard run (Connor Barth kick), 10:32. Chiefs 21–17. **Drive: 2 plays, 77 yards, 1:01.**
- MIA – Anthony Fasano 14-yard pass from Chad Pennington (Dan Carpenter kick), 6:12. Dolphins 24–21. **Drive: 7 plays, 66 yards, 4:20.**
- KC – Tyler Thigpen 8-yard run (Connor Barth kick), 0:50. Chiefs 28–24. **Drive: 8 plays, 95 yards, 1:26.**

**Third quarter**

- KC – Connor Barth 27-yard field goal, 9:11. Chiefs 31–24. **Drive: 9 plays, 69 yards, 5:49.**
- MIA – Ricky Williams 4-yard run (Dan Carpenter kick), 6:46. Tied 31–31. **Drive: 5 plays, 60 yards, 2:25.**

**Fourth quarter**

- MIA – Anthony Fasano 14-yard pass from Chad Pennington (Dan Carpenter kick), 4:08. Dolphins 38–31. **Drive: 13 plays, 85 yards, 8:33.**

**Top passers**

- MIA – Chad Pennington – 26/34, 235 yards, 3 TD, INT
- KC – Tyler Thigpen – 20/41, 320 yards, 2 TD, 3 INT

**Top rushers**

- MIA – Patrick Cobbs – 2 rushes, 44 yards
- KC – Larry Johnson – 12 rushes, 108 yards, TD

**Top receivers**

- MIA – Davone Bess – 6 receptions, 57 yards
- KC – Jamaal Charles – 3 receptions, 102 yards

Kansas City hosted the Miami Dolphins in the second-coldest game ever held at Arrowhead Stadium on December 21 with the game-time temperature at 10 °F (−12 °C) and a wind chill at −12 °F (−24 °C). It was the coldest game that Miami had ever played in. Miami scored first on the opening drive with a touchdown by WR Ted Ginn Jr. Despite trailing 10–0 early in the game, Tyler Thigpen led the Chiefs to a 28–24 lead by halftime. The Chiefs failed to score a touchdown in the second half of the game, only managing a field goal by Connor Barth. The Dolphins broke a 31–31 tie with a touchdown by TE Anthony Fasano with 4:08 remaining in the game. With just over a minute remaining, Chiefs LB Demorrio Williams forced and recovered a fumble to give the Chiefs another chance to tie the game. A failed drive capped off by Thigpen's third interception helped Miami run out the clock. Thigpen threw a career best 320 yards with two touchdowns, but also threw three interceptions. TE Tony Gonzalez became the first Chiefs player and first NFL tight end to record four 1,000 yard receiving seasons. The game also marked the last time Gonzalez played in Arrowhead Stadium as a member of the Chiefs, due to his trade to the Falcons following the season.

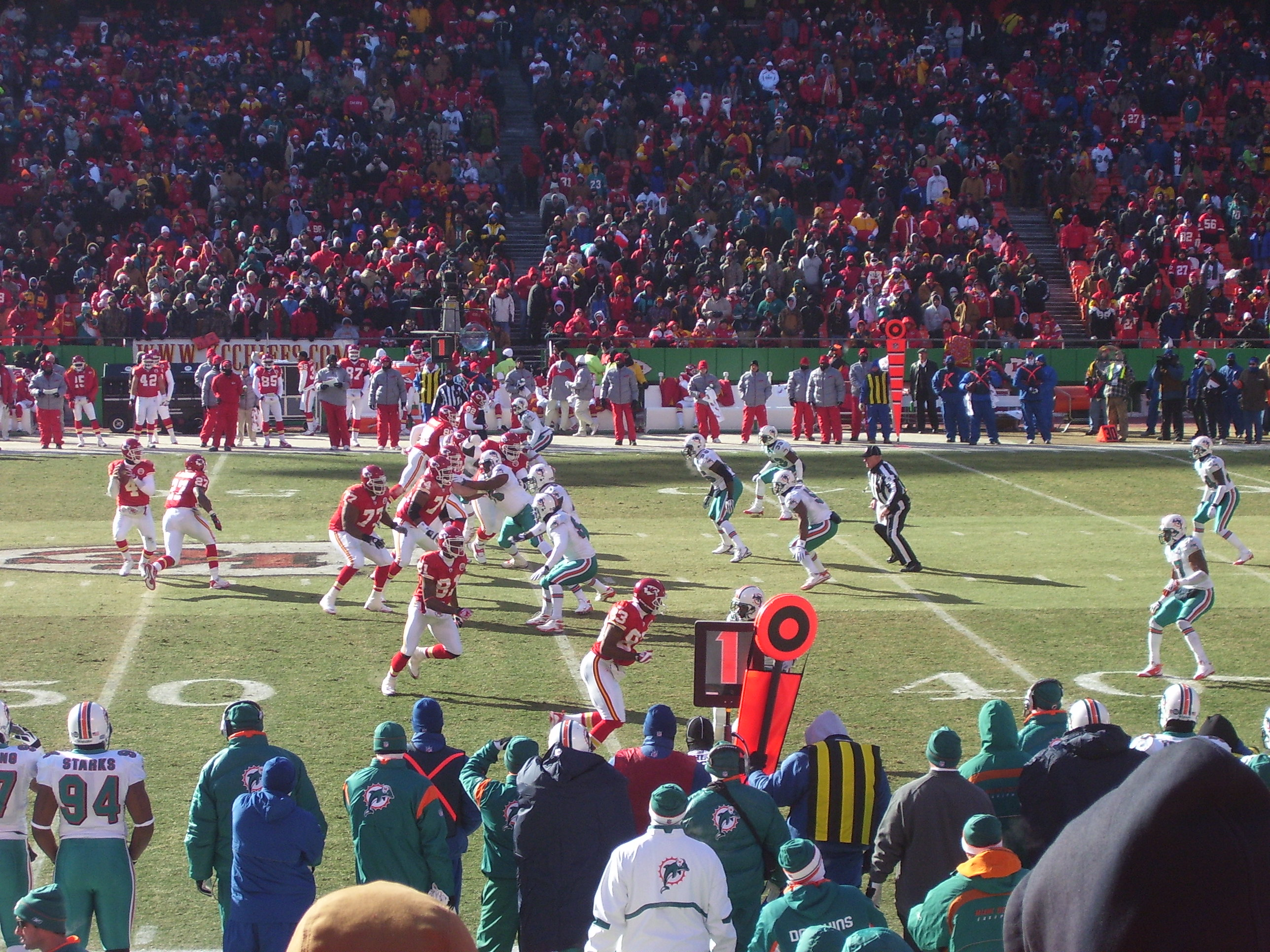

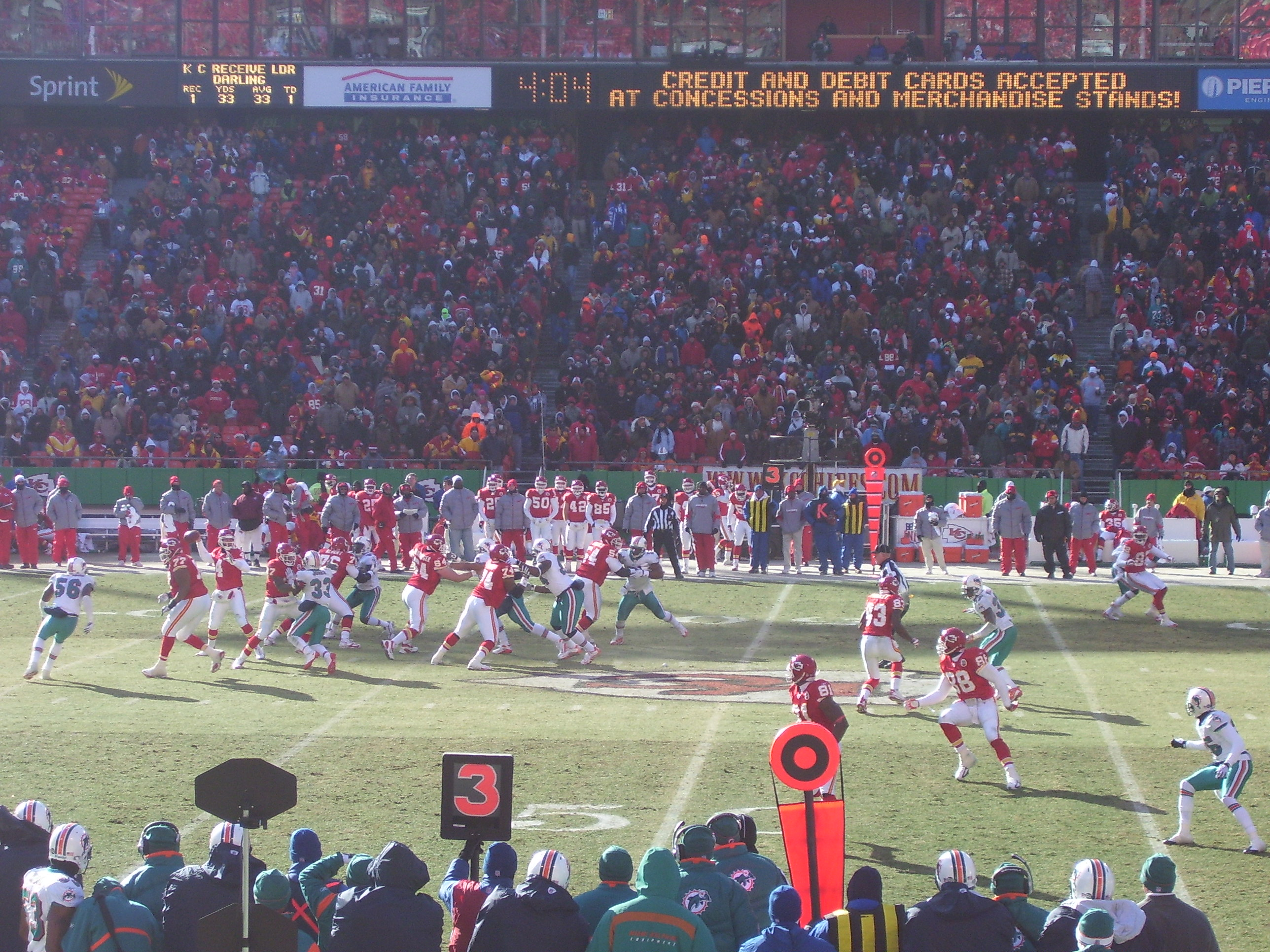

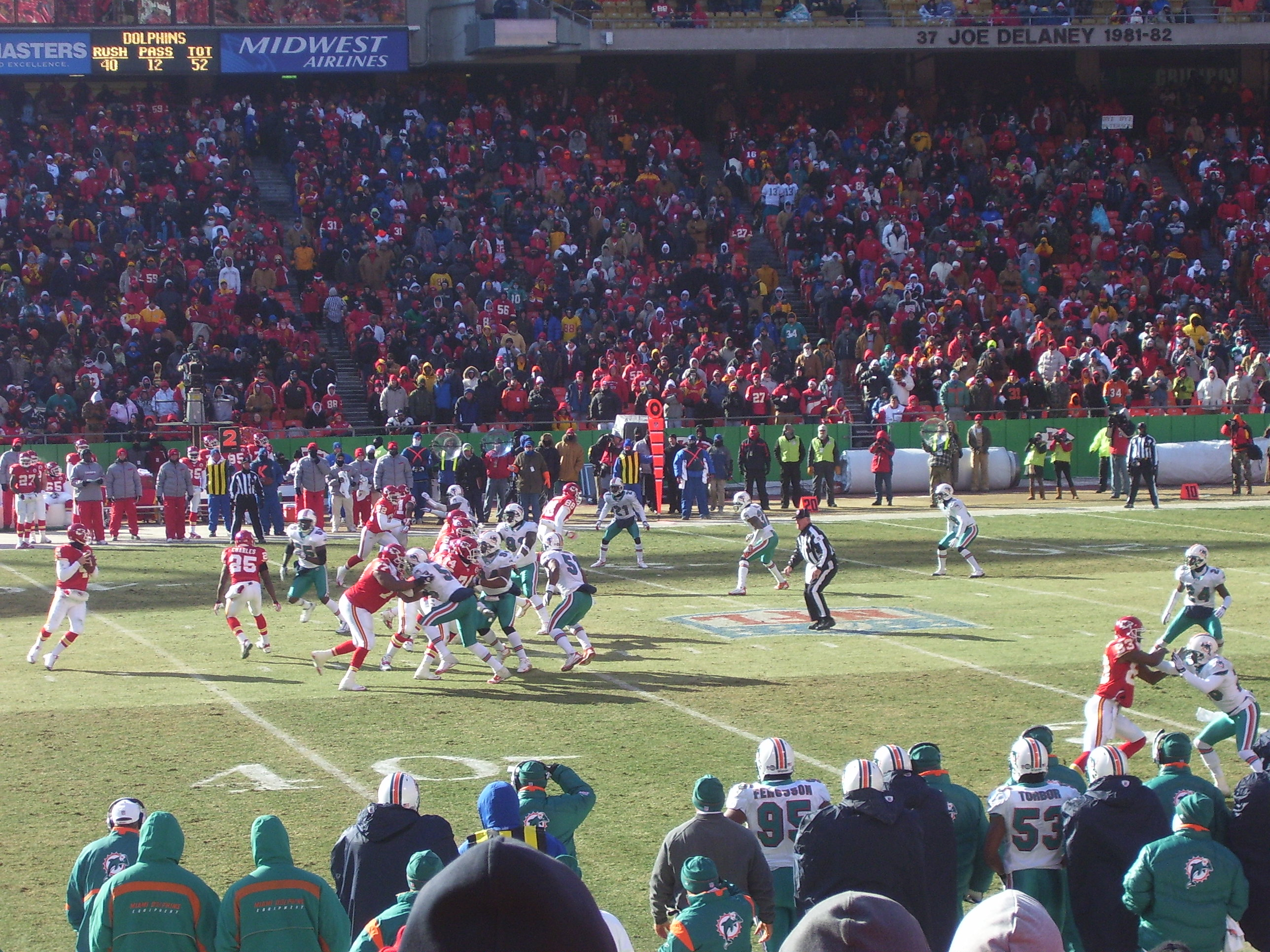

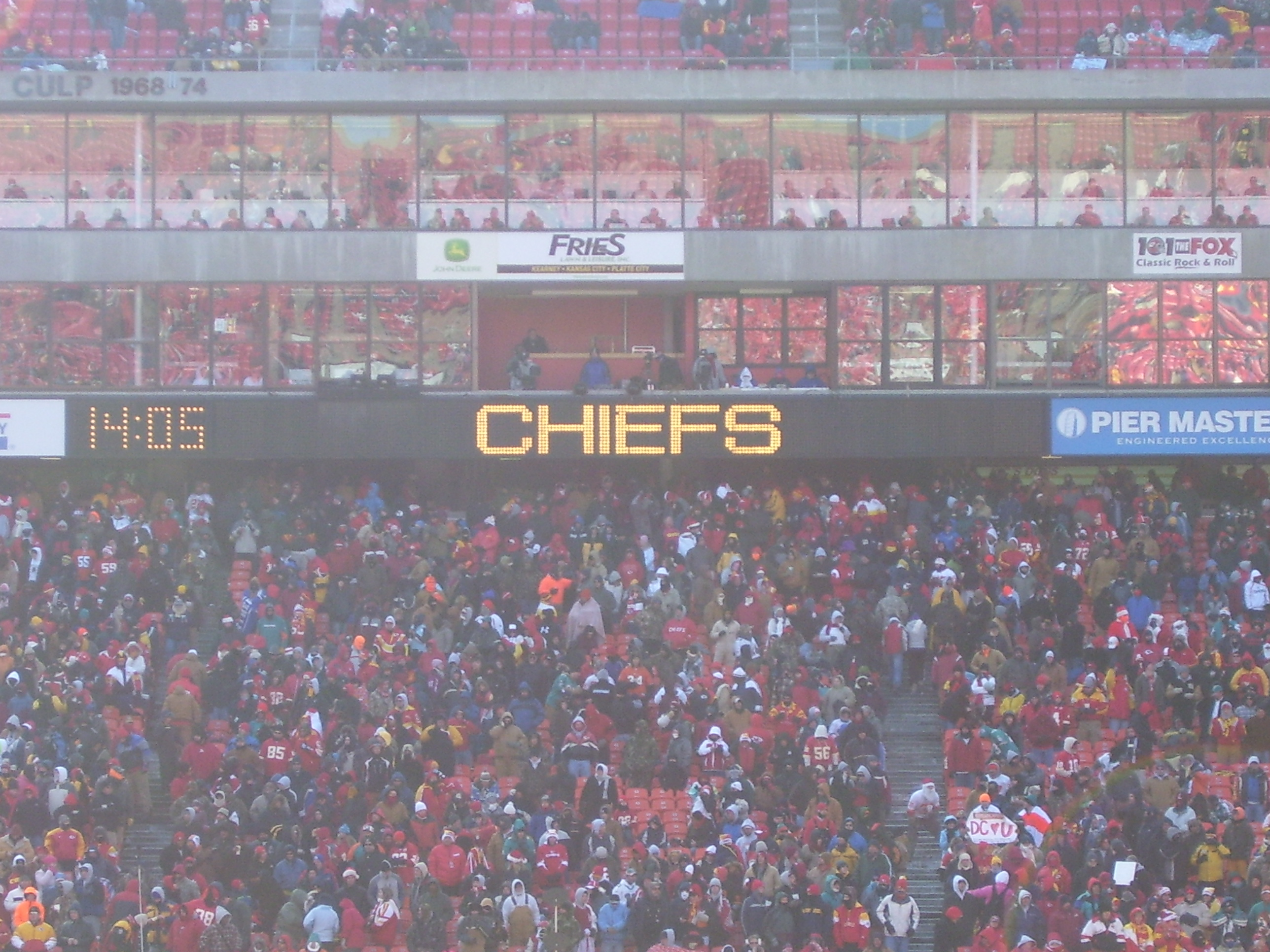

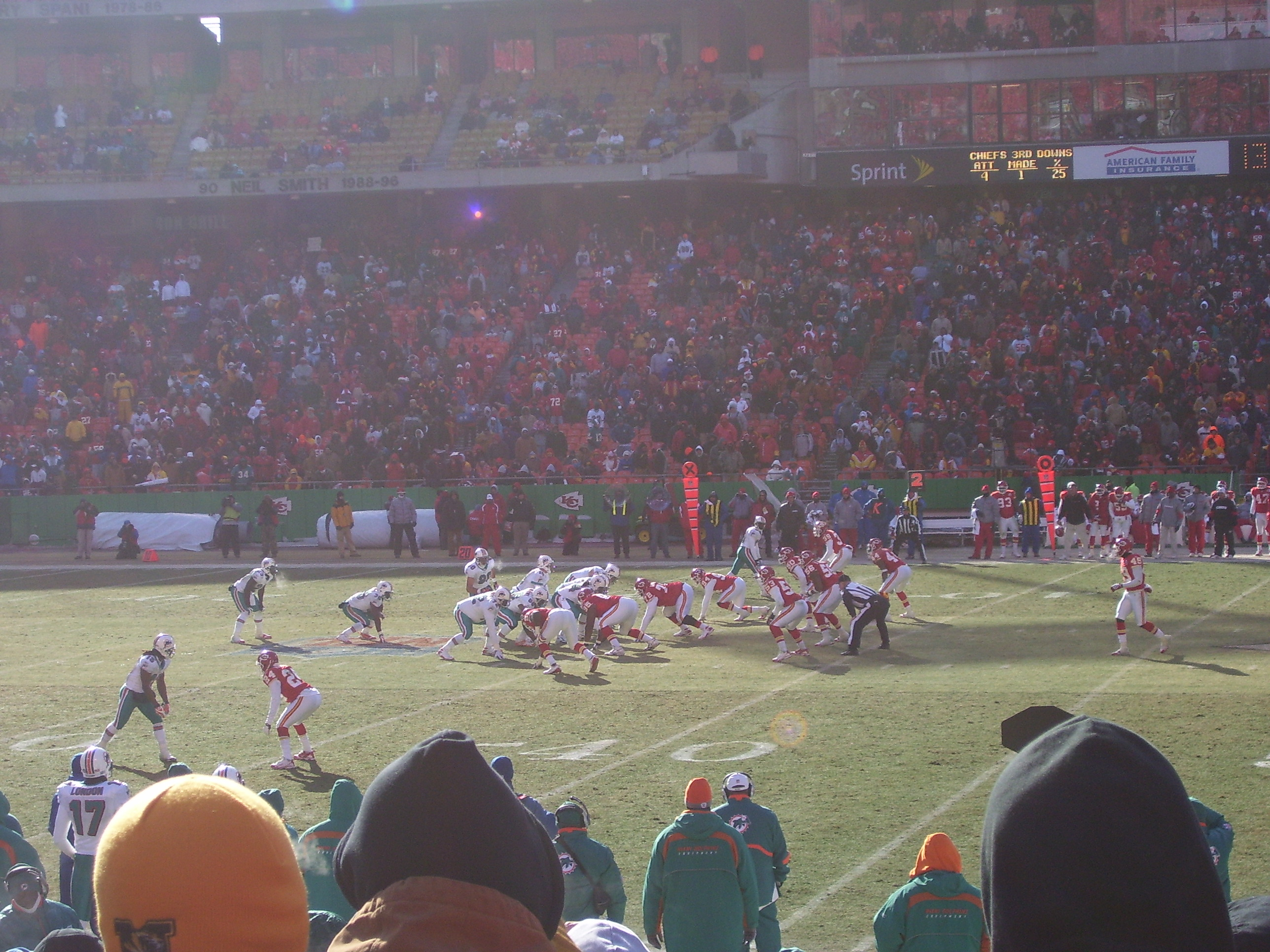

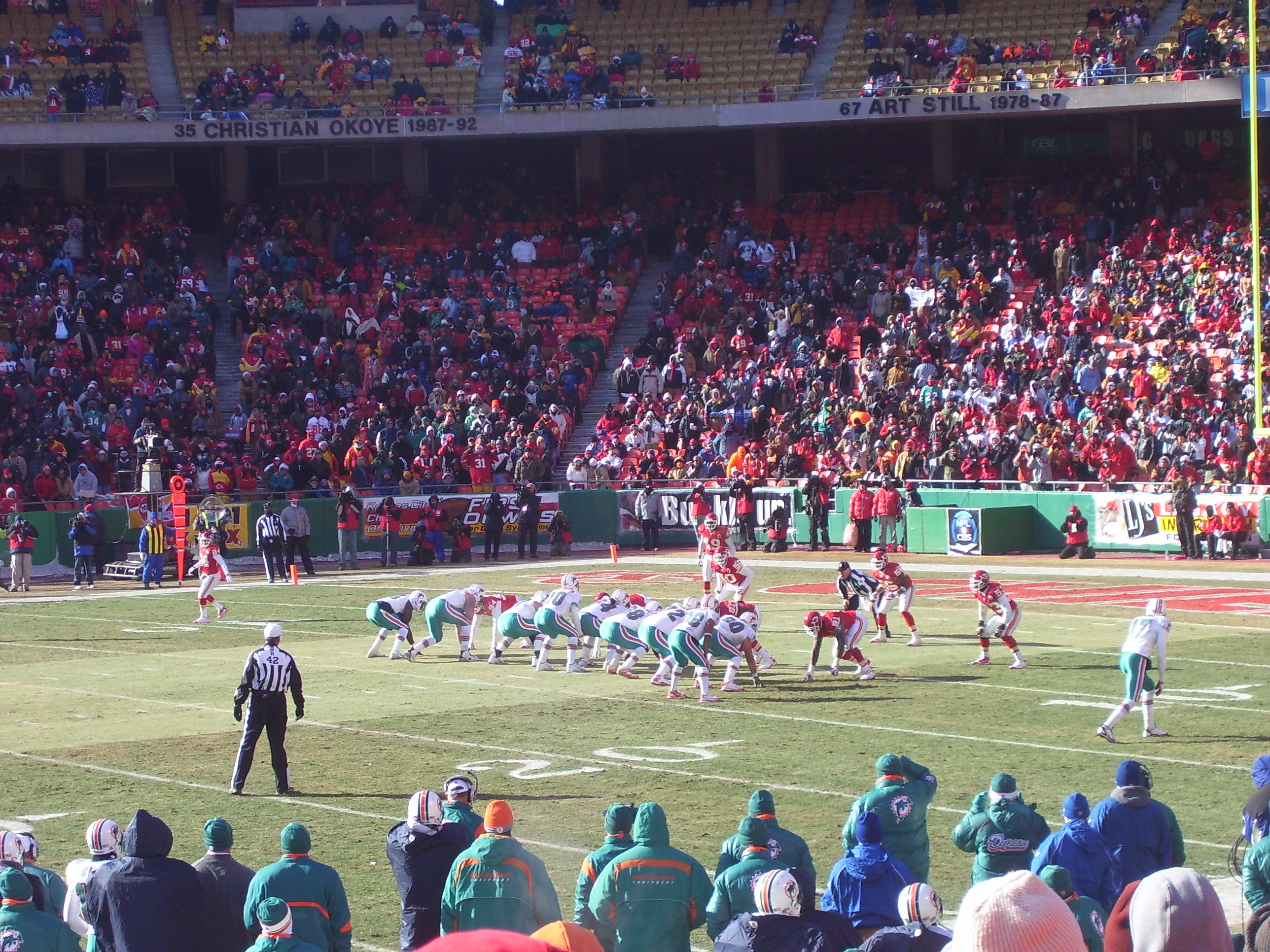

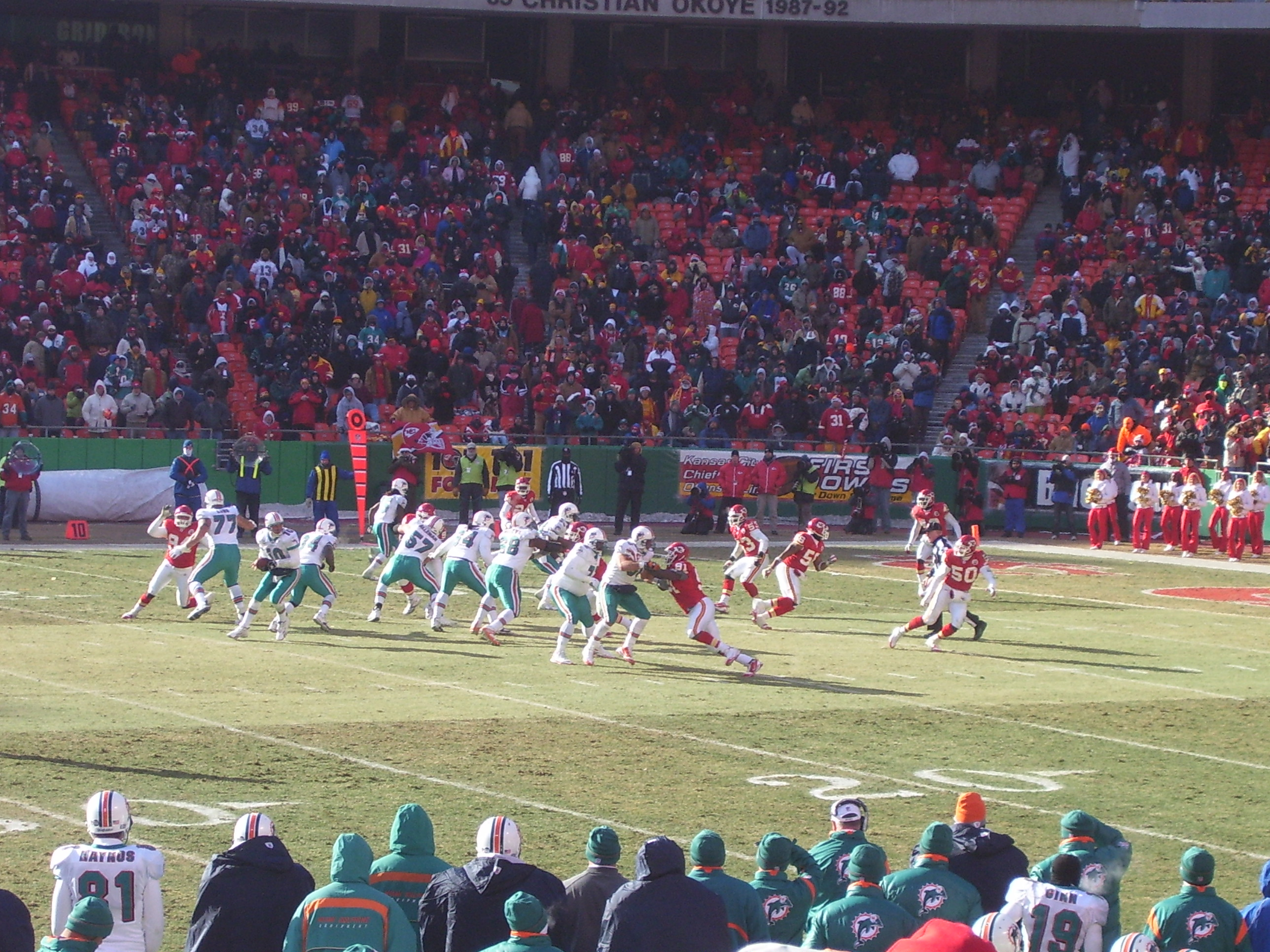

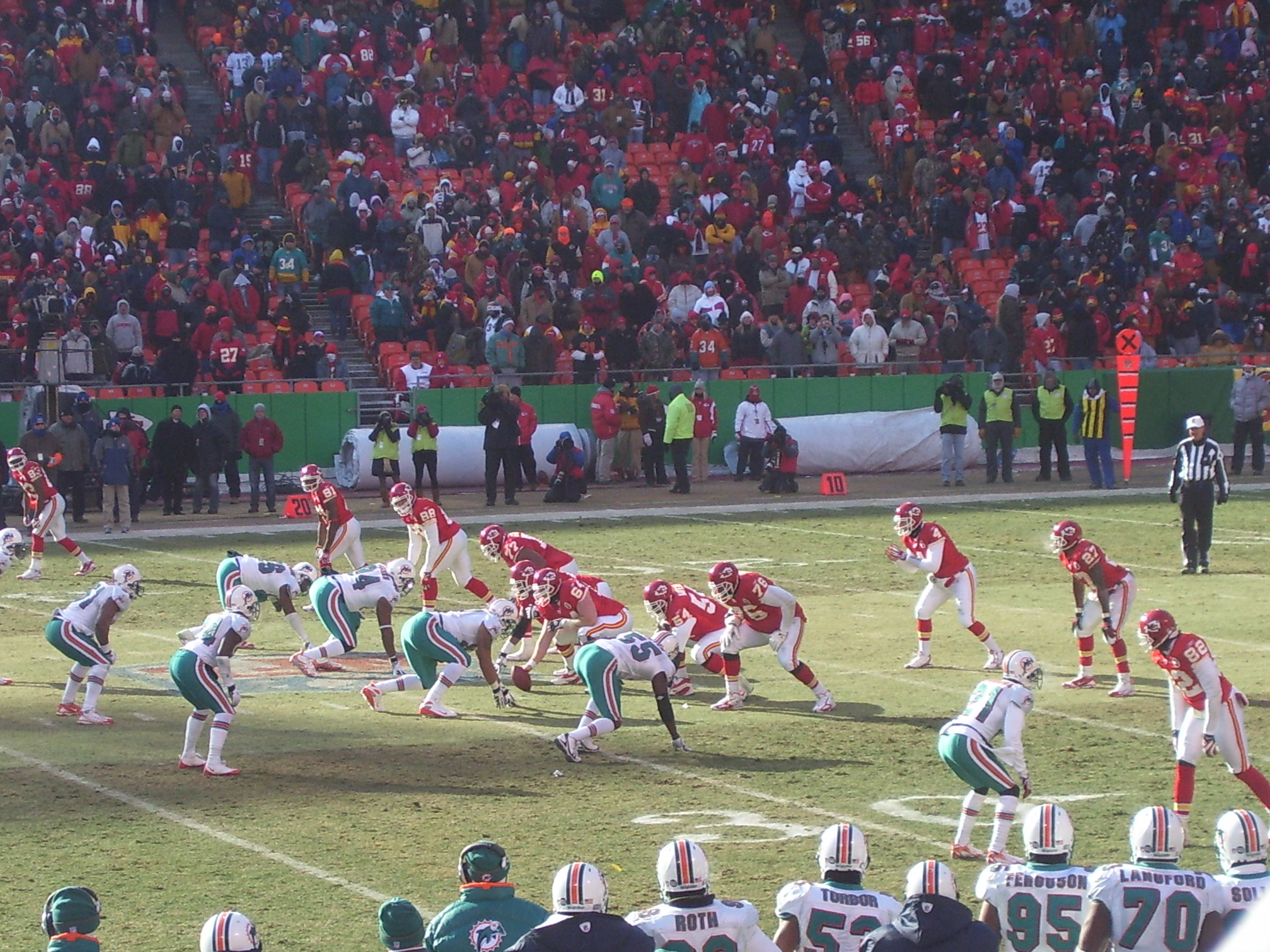

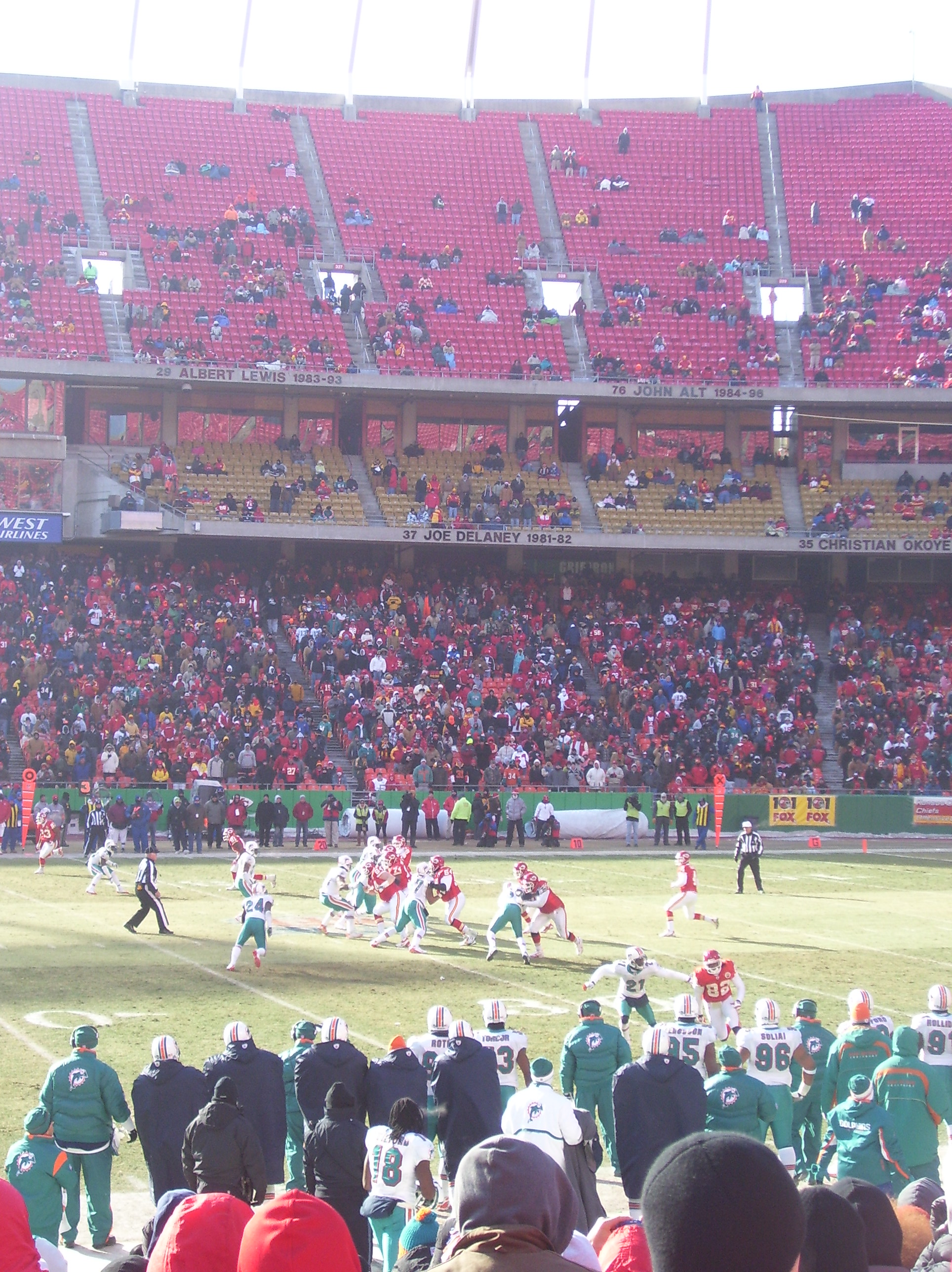

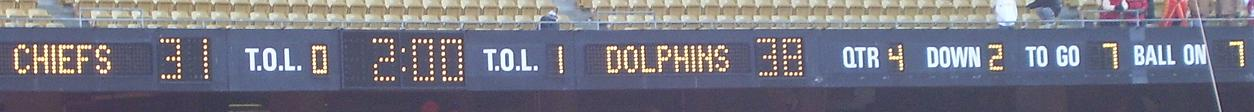

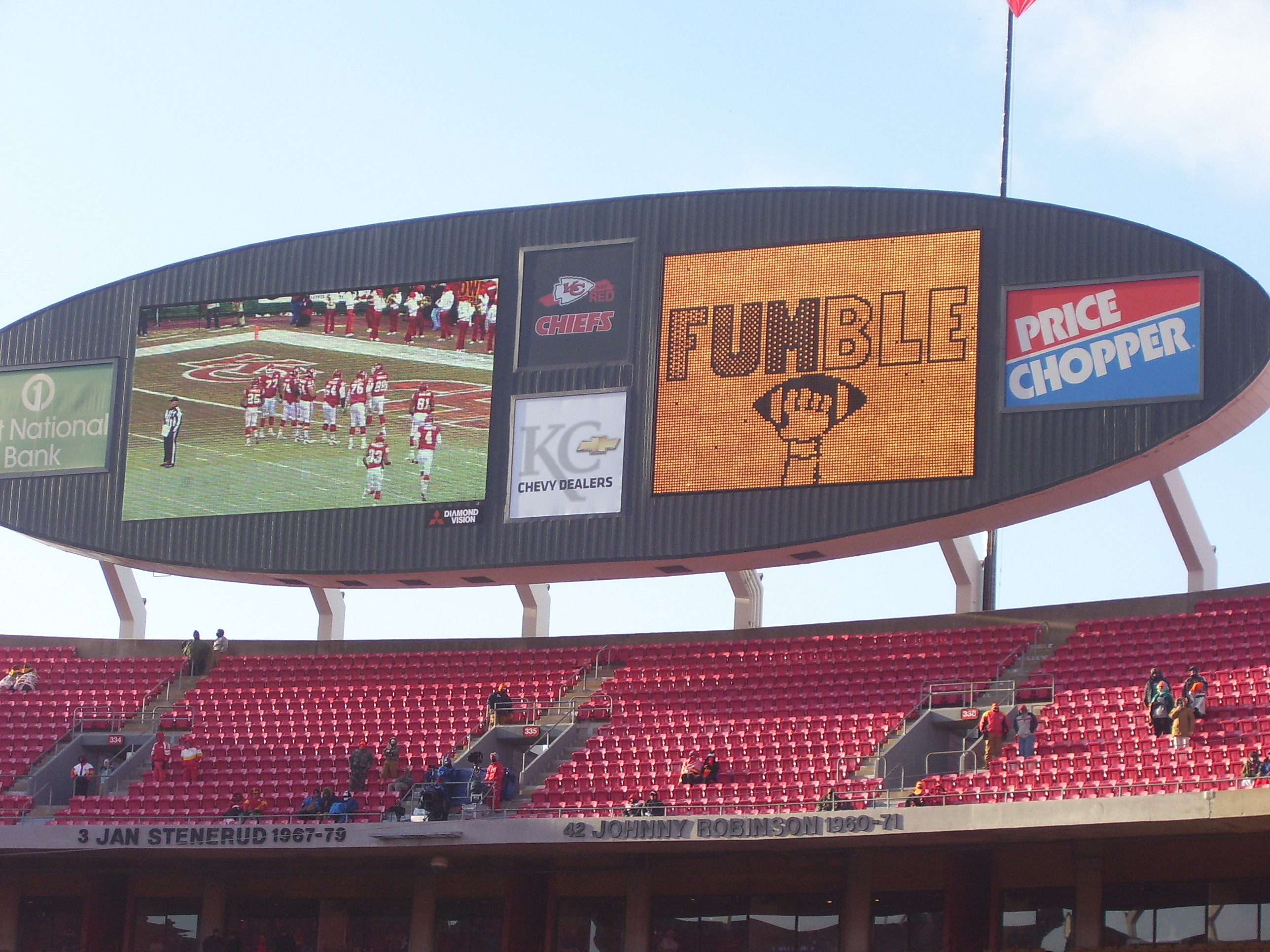

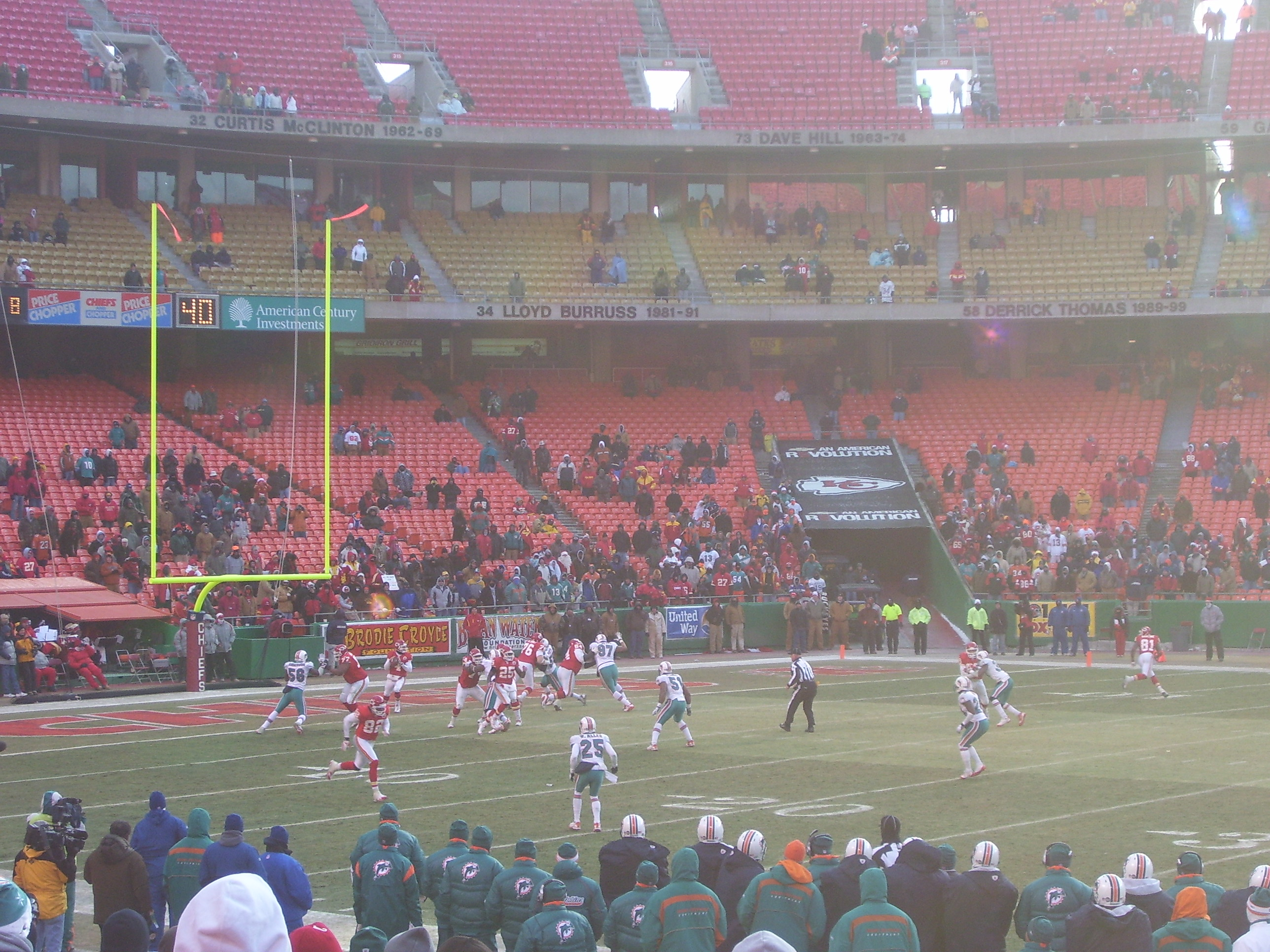

==== Week 17: at Cincinnati Bengals ====
Week 17: Kansas City Chiefs at Cincinnati Bengals – Game summary

Quarter	1	2	3	4	Total
Chiefs	0	0	0	6	**6**
**Bengals**	3	10	0	3	**16**

at Paul Brown Stadium, Cincinnati, Ohio

- Date: December 28
- Game time: 1:00 p.m. EST/12:00 p.m. CST
- Game weather: Sunny, 43 °F (6 °C)
- Game attendance: 63,984
- Referee: Bill Carollo
- TV announcers (CBS): Bill Macatee and Steve Beuerlein
- Recap, Game Book

Game information

**First quarter**

- CIN – Shayne Graham 38-yard field goal, 1:41. Bengals 3–0. **Drive: 11 plays, 63 yards, 5:53.**

**Second quarter**

- CIN – Cedric Benson 2-yard run (Shayne Graham kick), 10:57. Bengals 10–0. **Drive: 6 plays, 87 yards, 3:39.**
- CIN – Shayne Graham 30-yard field goal, 1:47. Bengals 13–0. **Drive: 16 plays, 81 yards, 7:46.**

**Third quarter**

- No scoring plays.

**Fourth quarter**

- CIN – Shayne Graham 43-yard field goal, 6:21. Bengals 16–0. **Drive: 4 plays, 9 yards, 1:52.**
- KC – Tony Gonzalez 5-yard pass from Tyler Thigpen (pass failed), 2:20. Bengals 16–6. **Drive: 11 plays, 91 yards, 6:01.**

**Top passers**

- KC – Tyler Thigpen – 19/36, 191 yards, TD
- CIN – Ryan Fitzpatrick – 18/30, 129 yards

**Top rushers**

- KC – Larry Johnson – 10 rushes, 18 yards
- CIN – Cedric Benson – 25 rushes, 111 yards, TD

**Top receivers**

- KC – Dwayne Bowe – 10 receptions, 103 yards
- CIN – Andre Caldwell – 5 receptions, 34 yards

The Bengals hosted the Chiefs for both teams' final game of the 2008 season on December 28. Entering the game, the Bengals had a 3–11–1 record and the Chiefs had a 2–13 record. While there was speculation over the job status of Herm Edwards as head coach entering the off-season, RB Larry Johnson voiced his intention to seek a trade. Cincinnati completely dominated the game. They outrushed the Chiefs 204 yards to 31 yards. Kansas City could only manage two first downs in the first half.

The Chiefs did not get closer than the Bengals' 37-yard line until their final drive, which ended with TE Tony Gonzalez's 5-yard touchdown catch from QB Tyler Thigpen with 2:20 left in the game. A two-point conversion attempt failed, and the Bengals effectively held the lead for the remainder of the game. The Chiefs' defense had one sack in the game to finish the season with 10–the fewest in the NFL since the league started recording team sacks in 1960. The team surpassed the 1982 Baltimore Colts' record of 11 sacks.

With the loss, the Chiefs would finish with a franchise worst 2-14 record and dead last in the AFC.

=== Standings ===
AFC West
	W	L	T	PCT	DIV	CONF	PF	PA	STK
^{(4)} San Diego Chargers	8	8	0	.500	5–1	7–5	439	347	W4
Denver Broncos	8	8	0	.500	3–3	5–7	370	448	L3
Oakland Raiders	5	11	0	.313	2–4	4–8	263	388	W2
Kansas City Chiefs	2	14	0	.125	2–4	2–10	291	440	L4

== Season statistics ==
All statistics through the completion of the 2008 NFL season (December 28, 2008).

=== Offense ===
Yards per game: 314.6 (#22 in NFL)

Total yards in season: 4,719 (#22 in NFL)

Points per game: 19.0 (#25 in NFL)

Points in season: 285 (#25 in NFL)

Quarterback rating:

- Tyler Thigpen (11 starts) – 75.8

Rushing yards in season: 1,779 (#11 in NFL)

Rushing yards per game: 118.6 (#11 in NFL)

Passing yards in season: 2,940 (#19 in NFL)

Passing yards per game: 196.0 (#19 in NFL)

=== Defense ===
Yards allowed per game: 397.5 (#31 in NFL)

Rushing yards allowed per game: 155.9 (#30 in NFL)

Passing yards allowed per game: 241.5 (#30 in NFL)

Points allowed in season: 424 (#30 in NFL)

Points allowed per game: 28.3 (#30 in NFL)

Fewest quarterback sacks, team: 10 (#32 in NFL–all-time record)
