= 2009 Kansas City Chiefs season =

NFL team season

- Owner: The Hunt family (Clark Hunt Chairman and CEO)
- General manager: Scott Pioli
- Head coach: Todd Haley
- Home stadium: Arrowhead Stadium

Results
- Record: 4–12
- Division place: 4th AFC West
- Playoffs: Did not qualify
- All-Pros: None
- Pro Bowlers: None
- Team MVP: Jamaal Charles
- Team ROY: Ryan Succop

The 2009 season was the Kansas City Chiefs' 40th in the National Football League (NFL), their 50th overall, and their first under head coach Todd Haley and general manager Scott Pioli. The Chiefs attempted to improve on their 2–14 record from 2008 with the third overall selection in the 2009 NFL draft. In 2009, the Chiefs also honored the induction of Derrick Thomas, the team's former linebacker from 1989 to 1999, into the Pro Football Hall of Fame. Thomas' jersey number 58 was officially retired by the franchise after having been unissued since Thomas' death in 2000.

The fate of head coach Herman Edwards and his staff remained uncertain after the end of the 2008 season in which the Chiefs finished with a franchise worst 2–14 record. The team was 6–26 in the past two years under Edwards, who had one year left on a four-year, $12 million contract and was lobbying to be allowed another year to get his rebuilding movement off the ground. Team owner Clark Hunt voiced his support of Edwards, but he had also said the new general manager Scott Pioli would have "significant input" into the decision on whether to retain him. On January 23, the Chiefs fired Edwards, and on February 5, Todd Haley was hired as the 11th head coach in Chiefs franchise history and signed a four-year contract.

For the 2009 season under the Pioli/Haley regime, the Chiefs switched from a 4–3 defense to a 3–4 defensive strategy.

Although finishing the regular season last in the AFC West with a record of 4–12, the Chiefs doubled their win record from the previous season. The Chiefs did not have a single player named to the Pro Bowl for the first time since 1978 and only the 3rd time in franchise history.

== Offseason ==
=== AFL anniversary season ===
In select games, the Chiefs, as well as the other founding teams of the American Football League, will wear "throwback" uniforms to celebrate the AFL's 50th anniversary and the 1962 Dallas Texans team that won the AFL Championship. The Chiefs "throwback" look will feature helmets with gray facemasks and a Texas-shaped decal with a gold star showing the location of the city of Dallas, Texas. From 1960 to 1962, the team was known as the Dallas Texans and played at the Cotton Bowl alongside the NFL's Dallas Cowboys. Jerseys for the club's "throwback" games will include a patch that honors the AFL's 50th anniversary. Kansas City will wear these replica uniforms when they host the Dallas Cowboys at Arrowhead Stadium and against two AFC West opponents yet to be determined (one home date and one away date).

The team's decision to wear the Texans' helmets started a controversy with some Chiefs fans who believed the team needed to honor the franchise's years in Kansas City, not Dallas. A petition by Sports Radio 810 WHB in Kansas City states that "the Chiefs have a responsibility to help promote the state and region that have supported them financially through stadium taxes, ticket sales, parking fees, concessions and merchandise sales for 47 years."

=== General manager search ===
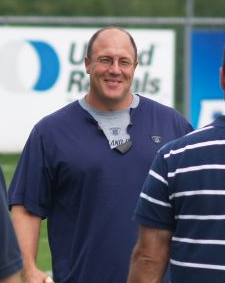
Scott Pioli was hired on January 13.

With his proven track record of success, Scott is the finest player personnel executive in the NFL, and we look forward to his leadership in building a championship organization.

— Clark Hunt on hiring Scott Pioli as general manager.

Following the resignation of Carl Peterson, the Chiefs' general manager, chief executive officer, and team president, a search for the team's new general manager began. Chiefs owner Clark Hunt said he intended to split the three jobs that Peterson held for nearly 20 years, looking for "a shrewd evaluator of football talent" at the general manager's position. Possible candidates included former Chiefs head coach Marty Schottenheimer, Indianapolis Colts vice president of football operations Chris Polian, Tampa Bay Buccaneers director of pro personnel Mark Dominik, former Denver Broncos general manager Ted Sundquist, former Tennessee Titans general manager Floyd Reese, San Diego Chargers director of player personnel Jimmy Raye III, Baltimore Ravens director of college scouting Eric DeCosta, and New England Patriots vice president of football operations Scott Pioli. Hunt said he would hire a new person to overlook football operations and a second person to be in charge of the team's business operations. That job, team president, was given to longtime team executive vice president Denny Thum.

Pioli reportedly sought "total control" of an organization and was also pursued by the Cleveland Browns to be their new general manager. Pioli's supposed intentions of "total control" could have possibly eliminated him from the Chiefs' job. Hunt had kept his search almost entirely leak-proof, instructing subordinates that only he is to speak to the situation. Hunt also intended to be thorough and patient in his search for the Chiefs' new general manager. Pioli was reportedly the Chiefs' number one candidate and on January 13 the Chiefs hired Pioli as general manager. The official statement from the Chiefs said that Pioli would "have final say over all football operations and report directly to (Clark) Hunt." The Chiefs introduced Pioli the following day at team headquarters in Kansas City.

=== Coaching changes ===
==== Hiring Todd Haley ====
The decision to hire Scott Pioli as general manager likely meant that head coach Herman Edwards would not return for a fourth season as Chiefs head coach. The Kansas City Star reported that according to two coaches, Edwards and his staff could have been dismissed as soon as Wednesday, January 14, the day when Pioli was introduced in Kansas City. At his press conference, Pioli did not rule out Edwards being retained as the team's head coach. Hunt said publicly that he wanted Edwards to return in 2009, but Pioli would have "significant input" in the final decision.

Several candidates were mentioned as possible replacements for Edwards even before he had been fired. The most notable names mentioned were Todd Haley, the offensive coordinator of the 2008 NFC Champion Arizona Cardinals, New York Giants defensive coordinator Steve Spagnuolo, and Mike Shanahan, the former head coach of the Chiefs' rival Raiders and Broncos franchises. Other possible candidates included Jon Gruden, Leslie Frazier, Winston Moss, Kirk Ferentz, Jason Garrett, and even Scott Pioli's father-in-law, Bill Parcells.

Edwards was fired on January 23, and ESPN's Chris Mortensen reported later that evening that the Chiefs were targeting Mike Shanahan to become the next head coach. Mortensen initially reported that the Chiefs were negotiating on a contract with Shanahan. The report was later denied by Shanahan himself.

After a long period in which Haley was considered the front-runner for the head coaching position, there was concern as to whether the Chiefs would violate the Rooney Rule by immediately hiring Haley. The Rooney Rule, named after Pittsburgh Steelers owner Dan Rooney, specifies that NFL teams must give fair interviews to minority candidates whenever a head coaching position comes open. Some minority coaches were reportedly turning down offers from the Chiefs since Haley was the presumed target for the coaching vacancy. The Chiefs negotiated with Haley following the Cardinals' loss in Super Bowl XLIII, and Haley accepted the coaching position on February 5. Haley was introduced as head coach the following day.

Defensive coordinator Gunther Cunningham was hired by the Detroit Lions for the same position. Cunningham had been the defensive coordinator for the Chiefs from 1995 to 1998 and 2004 to 2008. He also served as the team's head coach from 1999 to 2000. The Chiefs also lost secondary coach David Gibbs to the Houston Texans and Mike Priefer to the Denver Broncos. Once Todd Haley was hired, the Chiefs fired tight ends coach Jon Embree, defensive assistant/assistant linebacker coach Michael Ketchum, running backs coach Curtis Modkins, offensive assistant/quality control coach Kevin Patullo, and wide receivers coach Eric Price.

==== Assistant coaches and administration ====
For Haley's new coaching staff, the Chiefs hired Joel Collier, Gary Gibbs (linebackers), Steve Hoffman (special teams), Bill Muir (offensive line), Clancy Pendergast (defensive coordinator), Pat Perles, Dedric Ward (wide receivers), Ronnie Bradford (defensive assistant), Nick Sirianni (offensive quality control coach), and Maurice Carthon (assistant head coach). From Herman Edwards' staff, Chan Gailey was retained as offensive coordinator, and Bob Bicknell switched from offensive line to tight ends coach, and Joe D'Alessandris was retained as assistant offensive line coach. The Chiefs also relieved duties of several scouts and player personnel assistants once the 2009 NFL draft concluded.

Initially there were doubts as to whether Chan Gailey would be retained under Todd Haley's coaching staff, as Haley had just concluded a successful stint as offensive coordinator at Arizona. After the Chiefs lost their first three preseason games, Gailey was relieved of duties and Haley was expected to assume offensive play-calling duties.

=== Roster changes and trade demands ===
Immediately following the Chiefs' 2008 season finale loss to the Cincinnati Bengals, running back Larry Johnson voiced his intention to seek a trade in the offseason. Johnson was involved in legal troubles in 2008 and his production on the field declined. As a result of his legal troubles, in March 2009 Johnson pleaded guilty to the two incidents that occurred in 2008 and was sentenced to two years probation. Johnson served suspensions from the NFL in 2008 and is not expected to receive further punishment from the charges.

Guard Brian Waters had issues with Todd Haley shortly after Haley's hiring, saying the coach had been disrespectful of him during a meeting, then that new general manager Scott Pioli refused to meet with him privately. Waters later told the Kansas City Star that he wanted to be traded and did not attend any of the team's voluntary offseason workouts. Newly acquired linebacker Mike Vrabel also did not attend offseason workouts citing his rights with the league's collective bargaining agreement.

Tight end Tony Gonzalez reiterated his intentions for a trade in March 2009 after a failed attempt in October 2008. He was eventually traded in April to the Atlanta Falcons.

Gonzalez lobbied for the Chiefs to keep Tyler Thigpen as the team's starting quarterback when Gonzalez was still with the team and when Matt Cassel was not yet on the Chiefs roster. Though he appeared to be the Chiefs' lone quarterback who would remain in their plans for 2009, especially after Damon Huard was released Thigpen was not considered a lock for the starting job. Thigpen competed with Matt Cassel for the starting quarterback position.

==== Departures ====
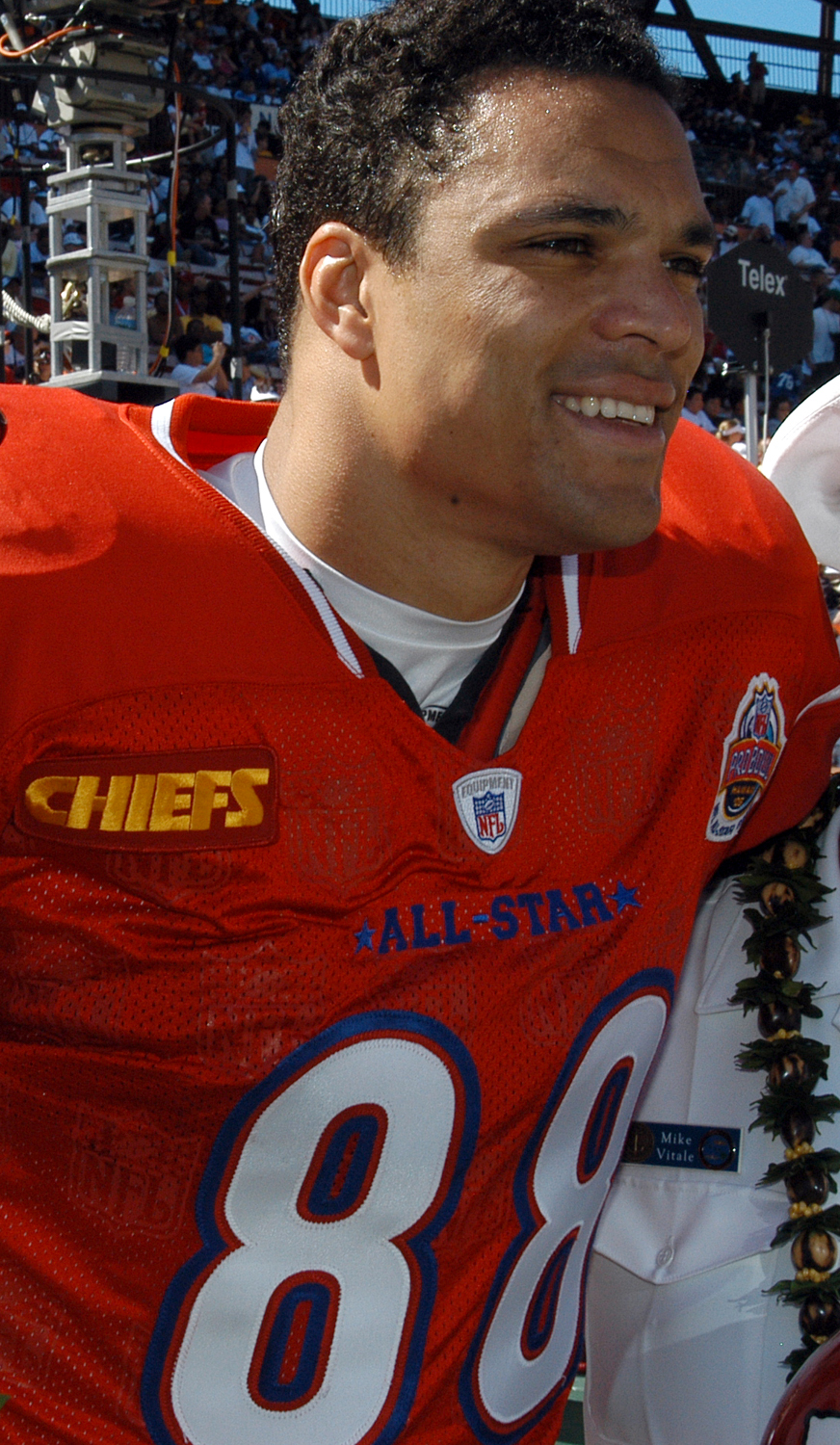
After several trade attempts in the previous year, Tony Gonzalez was traded to Atlanta in April.

In February, the Chiefs released linebacker Donnie Edwards, quarterback Damon Huard, tight end Michael Merritt, and cornerback Patrick Surtain. In March, quarterback Quinn Gray was released. and in April wide receiver Will Franklin, tackle Andrew Carnahan, linebacker Curtis Gatewood, and wide receiver Kevin Robinson were released.

On April 23 the Chiefs traded tight end Tony Gonzalez to the Atlanta Falcons in exchange for a second-round draft pick in the 2010 NFL Draft. In 2008 Gonzalez asked Chiefs management for a trade but negotiations failed and new general manager Scott Pioli reiterated that Gonzalez was initially not offered in trades for the 2009 season but agreed when the Falcons offered a second-round pick. Gonzalez had sought a trade in the 2008 season but several attempts failed.

At the conclusion of the preseason, the Chiefs released 13 players to reach the 53-player limit. Players released were safety Bernard Pollard, wide receiver Ashley Lelie, wide receiver Taurus Johnson, defensive tackle Derek Lokey, safety Ricky Price, and linebacker Zach Thomas. cornerback Jackie Bates, tight end Tom Crabtree, defensive end Dion Gales, defensive end Bobby Greenwood, guard Darryl Harris, running back Javarris Williams and wide receiver Rodney Wright were added to the practice squad.

After the first regular season game, the Chiefs waived linebacker Turk McBride. After the third game, the Chiefs traded quarterback Tyler Thigpen to the Miami Dolphins for an undisclosed draft pick.

==== Additions ====
Despite having several needs to be addressed and nearly $35 million in salary cap room, the Chiefs were criticized for being "quiet" in free-agency after the Cassel/Vrabel trade, primarily adding back-up players for depth.

In March, the Chiefs signed linebacker Darrell Robertson, wide receiver C. J. Jones, cornerback Travis Daniels, linebacker Corey Mays, wide receiver Bobby Engram, linebacker Monty Beisel, wide receiver Terrance Copper. and guard Mike Goff.

In April, the Chiefs signed wide receiver Rodney Wright, long snapper Tanner Purdum, linebacker Zach Thomas, tight end Sean Ryan, tight end Tony Curtis, and center Eric Ghiaciuc.

In June, the Chiefs signed safety Mike Brown.

In August, the Chiefs signed wide receiver Amani Toomer but he was later released at the end of the preseason.

In September, the Chiefs signed wide receiver Bobby Wade.

In November, the Chiefs signed wide receiver Chris Chambers.

===== Cassel/Vrabel trade =====
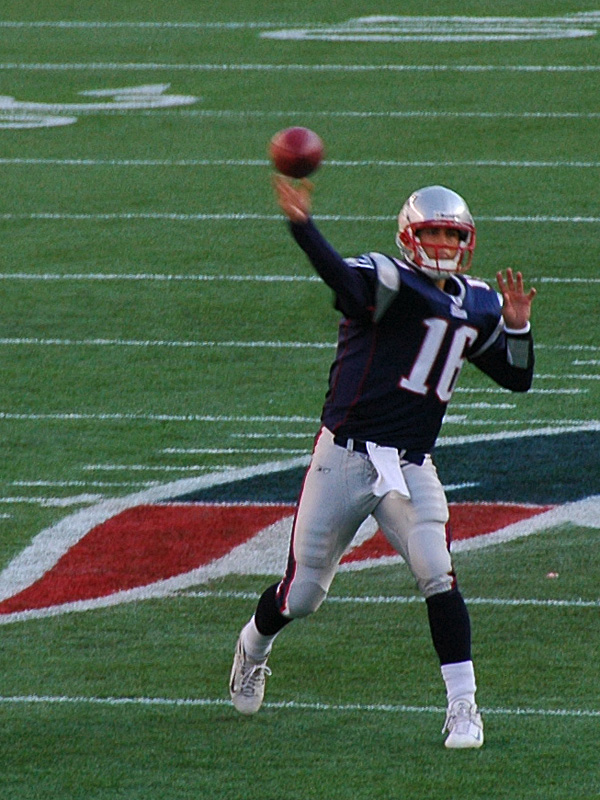
Matt Cassel was acquired in February.

On the first day of free agency (February 27), the Chiefs acquired linebacker Mike Vrabel from the Patriots for an undisclosed draft pick. The Boston Globe speculated that it would be part of a bigger trade involving quarterback Matt Cassel. The next day, the Chiefs confirmed the acquisition of both Vrabel and Cassel from New England in exchange for their second-round draft selection in the 2009 NFL draft (#34 overall).

Reactions to the trade were mixed and it was called "monumentally lopsided" with the Chiefs "clearly (getting) the better end of the deal." Don Banks of Sports Illustrated called the Chiefs the "big winners" of the first weekend of NFL free agency and the Patriots' compensation "laughably low", but the best they could get in return. The trade was done mainly because the Patriots could not keep two quarterbacks on their roster that took up $29.2 million of salary cap space, so it was not a matter of if the Patriots would trade Cassel, but when. The Patriots also had Tom Brady under contract, who was recovering from a knee-injury suffered in a 2008 game against the Chiefs.

On July 15 the Chiefs signed Cassel to six-year contract extension worth a total of $63 million.

==== Free agency ====
Position	Player	Tag	Date signed	2009 team	Contract (with KC)
DE	Jason Babin	UFA		Philadelphia Eagles	
LB	Rocky Boiman	UFA		Tennessee Titans	
SS	Oliver Celestin	UFA		New York Sentinels (UFL)	
G	Adrian Jones	UFA		Houston Texans	
FS	Jon McGraw	UFA	March 6	Kansas City Chiefs	N/A
C	Rudy Niswanger	RFA	April 24	Kansas City Chiefs	N/A
FS	Jarrad Page	RFA	February 26	Kansas City Chiefs	N/A
LB	Pat Thomas	UFA		Buffalo Bills	
WR	Jeff Webb	RFA	April 20	Kansas City Chiefs	N/A

=== Draft ===
The Chiefs selected third overall in the 2009 NFL draft. After selecting a league-high 13 players in the 2008 Draft, the Chiefs were scheduled to make their standard seven selections pending trades prior to trading away their second-round draft pick to New England for Matt Cassel and Mike Vrabel, leaving them with just six choices. The Chiefs were later awarded the 256th and final selection in the 2009 NFL draft, making them effectively choose "Mr. Irrelevant." The player chosen was K Ryan Succop, who was the Chiefs' first "Mr. Irrelevant" since the 1970 NFL draft when DB Rayford Jenkins was chosen by the team from Alcorn A&M.

The Chiefs selected defensive end Tyson Jackson third overall. Jackson was the third consecutive first-round pick by the Chiefs to have played collegiately for the LSU Tigers. All terms of the contracts for the 2009 draft picks were undisclosed, but ESPN reported that Jackson signed a five-year contract worth $57 million, with $31 million guaranteed.

2009 Kansas City Chiefs draft
Round	Selection	Player	Position	College	Date signed
1	3	Tyson Jackson	Defensive end	Louisiana State	August 7
3	67	Alex Magee	Defensive tackle	Purdue	July 30
4	102	Donald Washington	Cornerback	Ohio State	July 30
5	139	Colin Brown	Offensive tackle	Missouri	June 30
6	175	Quinten Lawrence	Wide receiver	McNeese State	July 30
7	212	Javarris Williams	Running back	Tennessee State	July 23
7	237^{[a]}	Jake O'Connell	Tight end	Miami (OH)	June 26
7	256	Ryan Succop	Placekicker	South Carolina	June 23

Notes:

^{a} (Draft day trade) Obtained Carolina's seventh round selection (#237) via the Miami Dolphins. In exchange, the Dolphins received the Chiefs' 2010 seventh round selection.

== Final roster ==
2009 Kansas City Chiefs roster
Quarterbacks (QB): 7 Matt Cassel; 12 Brodie Croyle; 15 Matt Gutierrez; Running backs (RB): 46 Tim Castille FB; 25 Jamaal Charles; 42 Mike Cox FB; 40 Javarris Williams; Wide receivers (WR): 82 Dwayne Bowe; 11 Chris Chambers; 10 Terrance Copper; 14 Quinten Lawrence; 17 Lance Long; 80 Bobby Wade; Tight ends (TE): 85 Jake O'Connell; 45 Leonard Pope; 89 Sean Ryan	Offensive linemen (OL): 76 Branden Albert T; 62 Andy Alleman G; 66 Darryl Harris G; 60 Ikechuku Ndukwe T; 64 Rudy Niswanger C; 75 Ryan O'Callaghan T; 67 Barry Richardson T; 74 Wade Smith T; 54 Brian Waters G; Defensive linemen (DL): 72 Glenn Dorsey DE; 95 Ron Edwards NT; 70 Dion Gales DE; 92 Wallace Gilberry DE; 94 Tyson Jackson DE; 69 Derek Lokey NT; 71 Alex Magee DE	Linebackers (LB): 59 Jovan Belcher ILB; 91 Tamba Hali OLB; 52 David Herron ILB; 56 Derrick Johnson ILB; 51 Corey Mays ILB; 96 Andy Studebaker OLB; 50 Mike Vrabel OLB; 97 Pierre Walters OLB; 53 Demorrio Williams ILB; Defensive backs (DB): 30 Mike Brown SS; 39 Brandon Carr CB; 34 Travis Daniels CB; 24 Brandon Flowers CB; 48 Reshard Langford SS; 47 Jon McGraw FS; 35 Ricky Price FS; 23 Mike Richardson CB; 20 Donald Washington CB; Special teams (ST): 2 Dustin Colquitt P; 43 Thomas Gafford LS; 6 Ryan Succop K	Practice squad: 22 Jackie Bates CB; 65 Bobby Greenwood DE; 32 Kestahn Moore RB; 13 Logan Payne WR; 77 Jermail Porter T; 84 Chandler Williams WR; Reserve: 26 Jackie Battle RB (IR); 61 Colin Brown G (IR); 87 Brad Cottam TE (IR); 57 Weston Dacus LB (IR); 81 Devard Darling WR (IR); 79 Mike Goff G (IR); 31 Maurice Leggett CB (IR); 38 DaJuan Morgan S (IR); 44 Jarrad Page S (IR); 55 Justin Rogers LB (IR); 29 Dantrell Savage RB (IR); 21 Kolby Smith RB (IR); Rookies in italics 53 active, 12 reserve, 6 practice squad

== Staff ==
2009 Kansas City Chiefs staff
Front office: Chairman – Clark Hunt; President – Denny Thum; General manager – Scott Pioli; Assistant general manager – Joel Collier; Director of pro personnel – Ray Farmer; Director of college scouting – Phil Emery; Administrator of college scouting – Mike Borgonzi; General counsel/director of salary cap – Woodie Dixon; Head coaches: Head coach – Todd Haley; Assistant head coach – Maurice Carthon; Offensive coaches: Wide receivers – Dedric Ward; Tight ends – Bob Bicknell; Offensive line – Bill Muir; Assistant offensive line – Joe D'Alessandris; Offensive quality control – Nick Sirianni	Defensive coaches: Defensive coordinator – Clancy Pendergast; Defensive line – Tim Krumrie; Linebackers – Gary Gibbs; Defensive assistant – Ronnie Bradford; Defensive quality control – Pat Perles; Special teams coaches: Special teams – Steve Hoffman; Strength and conditioning: Strength and conditioning – Cedric Smith; Assistant strength and conditioning – Brent Salazar

== Preseason ==
The Chiefs conducted training camp at the University of Wisconsin–River Falls for the 19th and final consecutive year. The team will move training camp to St. Joseph, Missouri, in 2010. They lost all four games in the preseason to the Houston Texans, Minnesota Vikings, Seattle Seahawks, and St. Louis Rams (for the Missouri Governor's Cup). In the Chiefs' game against the Seahawks, QB Matt Cassel suffered a sprained Medial collateral ligament (MCL), leaving his status as starting quarterback for opening day in doubt. The offense for the Chiefs struggled in all four games, scoring only 42 points in four games and the offensive line suffered numerous breakdowns which led to Cassel's injury. The offensive struggles led to offensive coordinator Chan Gailey's firing and head coach Todd Haley assuming playcalling duties.

=== Schedule ===
Week	Date	Opponent	Result	Record	Venue	Recap
1	August 15	Houston Texans	L 10–16	0–1	Arrowhead Stadium	Recap
2	August 21	at Minnesota Vikings	L 13–17	0–2	Hubert H. Humphrey Metrodome	Recap
3	August 29	Seattle Seahawks	L 10–14	0–3	Arrowhead Stadium	Recap
4	September 3	at St. Louis Rams	L 9–17	0–4	Edward Jones Dome	Recap

=== Game summaries ===
==== Week 1: vs. Houston Texans ====
Week 1: Houston Texans at Kansas City Chiefs – Game summary

Quarter	1	2	3	4	Total
Texans	7	6	3	0	16
Chiefs	0	3	0	7	10

at Arrowhead Stadium, Kansas City, Missouri

- Date: August 15
- Game time: 7:00 p.m. CDT
- Game weather: Scattered showers with possible thunderstorms, 78 °F (26 °C)
- Game attendance: 64,781
- Referee: Tony Corrente
- Recap, Game Book

Game information

First quarter

- HOU – Chris Brown 2-yard run (Kris Brown kick), 2:07. Texans 7–0. Drive: 12 plays, 94 yards, 7:01.

Second quarter

- HOU – Kris Brown 23-yard field goal, 5:47. Texans 10–0. Drive: 6 plays, 19 yards, 2:47.
- HOU – Kris Brown 42-yard field goal, 1:12. Texans 13–0. Drive: 7 plays, 41 yards, 1:59.
- KC – Ryan Succop 47-yard field goal, 0:00. Texans 13–3. Drive: 9 plays, 49 yards, 1:12.

Third quarter

- HOU – Kris Brown 30-yard field goal, 0:21. Texans 16–3. Drive: 8 plays, 50 yards, 3:47.

Fourth quarter

- KC – Brad Cottam 1-yard pass from Tyler Thigpen (Ryan Succop kick), 5:15. Texans 16–10. Drive: 10 plays, 76 yards, 4:33.

Top passers

- HOU – Dan Orlovsky – 9/20, 121 yards
- KC – Brodie Croyle – 12/18, 145 yards

Top rushers

- HOU – Ryan Moats – 10 rushes, 52 yards
- KC – Dantrell Savage – 8 rushes, 39 yards

Top receivers

- HOU – André Davis – 3 receptions, 40 yards
- KC – Dwayne Bowe – 5 receptions, 70 yards

==== Week 2: at Minnesota Vikings ====
Week 2: Kansas City Chiefs at Minnesota Vikings – Game summary

Quarter	1	2	3	4	Total
Chiefs	3	7	3	0	13
Vikings	0	7	7	3	17

at Hubert H. Humphrey Metrodome, Minneapolis, Minnesota

- Date: August 21
- Game time: 7:00 p.m. CDT
- Game weather: None (indoor stadium)
- Game attendance: 62,782
- Referee: Ron Winter
- Recap, Game Book

Game information

First quarter

- KC – Ryan Succop 32-yard field goal, 5:56. Chiefs 3–0. Drive: 9 plays, 38 yards, 4:36.

Second quarter

- KC – Dwayne Bowe 4-yard pass from Matt Cassel (Ryan Succop kick), 11:02. Chiefs 10–0. Drive: 8 plays, 66 yards, 3:58.
- MIN – Visanthe Shiancoe 13-yard pass from Tarvaris Jackson (Ryan Longwell kick), 2:18. Chiefs 10–7. Drive: 15 plays, 92 yards, 8:44.

Third quarter

- KC – Ryan Succop 37-yard field goal, 5:36. Chiefs 13–7. Drive: 16 plays, 64 yards, 7:46.
- MIN – Darius Reynaud 64-yard pass from Tarvaris Jackson (Taylor Mehlhaff kick), 4:03. Vikings 14–13. Drive: 4 plays, 80 yards, 1:33.

Fourth quarter

- MIN – Taylor Mehlhaff 29-yard field goal, 8:37. Vikings 17–13. Drive: 11 plays, 61 yards, 5:19.

Top passers

- KC – Matt Cassel – 9/14, 99 yards, TD
- MIN – Tarvaris Jackson – 12/15, 202 yards, 2 TD

Top rushers

- KC – Jackie Battle – 9 rushes, 28 yards
- MIN – Adrian Peterson – 10 rushes, 44 yards

Top receivers

- KC – Dwayne Bowe – 3 receptions, 37 yards, TD
- MIN – Darius Reynaud – 2 receptions, 88 yards, TD

==== Week 3: vs. Seattle Seahawks ====
Week 3: Seattle Seahawks at Kansas City Chiefs – Game summary

Quarter	1	2	3	4	Total
Seahawks	0	7	7	0	14
Chiefs	7	0	0	3	10

at Arrowhead Stadium, Kansas City, Missouri

- Date: August 29
- Game time: 7:00 p.m. CDT
- Game weather: Clear, 73 °F (23 °C)
- Game attendance: 66,553
- Referee: Pete Morelli
- Recap, Game Book

Game information

First quarter

- KC – Brandon Flowers 28-yard interception return (Ryan Succop kick), 11:12. Chiefs 7–0.

Second quarter

- SEA – T. J. Houshmandzadeh 8-yard pass from Matt Hasselbeck (Olindo Mare kick), 0:56. Tied 7–7. Drive: 7 plays, 48 yards, 1:11.

Third quarter

- SEA – John Carlson 28-yard pass from Matt Hasselbeck (Olindo Mare kick), 10:37. Seahawks 14–7. Drive: 9 plays, 74 yards, 4:23.

Fourth quarter

- KC – Ryan Succop 35-yard field goal, 11:50. Seahawks 14–10. Drive: 8 plays, 63 yards, 3:44.

Top passers

- SEA – Matt Hasselbeck – 19/25, 216 yards, 2 TD, INT
- KC – Matt Gutierrez – 10/13, 113 yards, 2 INT

Top rushers

- SEA – Julius Jones – 15 rushes, 57 yards
- KC – Jamaal Charles – 7 rushes, 54 yards

Top receivers

- SEA – John Carlson – 5 receptions, 68 yards, TD
- KC – Ashley Lelie – 4 receptions, 52 yards

==== Week 4: at St. Louis Rams ====
Week 4: Kansas City Chiefs at St. Louis Rams – Game summary

Quarter	1	2	3	4	Total
Chiefs	3	6	0	0	9
Rams	0	7	7	3	17

at Edward Jones Dome, St. Louis, Missouri

- Date: September 3
- Game time: 7:00 p.m. CDT
- Game weather: None (indoor stadium)
- Game attendance: 46,616
- Referee: Carl Cheffers
- Recap, Game Book

Game information

First quarter

- KC – Ryan Succop 32-yard field goal, 5:56. Chiefs 3–0. Drive: 9 plays, 38 yards, 4:36.

Second quarter

- KC – Ryan Succop 40-yard field goal, 9:20. Chiefs 6–0. Drive: 7 plays, 76 yards, 3:03.
- STL – Daniel Fells 6-yard pass from Brock Berlin (Josh Brown kick), 1:51. Rams 7–6. Drive: 15 plays, 85 yards, 7:29.
- KC – Ryan Succop 34-yard field goal, 0:25. Chiefs 9–7. Drive: 4 plays, 7 yards, 0:44.

Third quarter

- STL – Quincy Butler 28-yard interception return (Josh Brown kick), 2:48. Rams 14–9.

Fourth quarter

- STL – Josh Brown 37-yard field goal, 4:08. Rams 17–9. Drive: 11 plays, 61 yards, 5:39.

Top passers

- KC – Matt Gutierrez – 7/14, 118 yards
- STL – Brock Berlin – 9/17, 97 yards, TD, INT

Top rushers

- KC – Dantrell Savage – 4 rushes, 73 yards
- STL – Chris Ogbonnaya – 17 rushes, 41 yards

Top receivers

- KC – Jackie Battle – 4 receptions, 63 yards
- STL – Ronald Curry – 3 receptions, 40 yards

== Regular season ==
=== Schedule ===
Week	Date	Opponent	Result	Record	Venue	Recap
1	September 13	at Baltimore Ravens	**L** 24–38	0–1	M&T Bank Stadium	Recap
2	September 20	**Oakland Raiders**	**L** 10–13	0–2	Arrowhead Stadium	Recap
3	September 27	at Philadelphia Eagles	**L** 14–34	0–3	Lincoln Financial Field	Recap
4	October 4	New York Giants	**L** 16–27	0–4	Arrowhead Stadium	Recap
5	October 11	Dallas Cowboys*	**L** 20–26 (OT)	0–5	Arrowhead Stadium	Recap
6	October 18	at Washington Redskins	**W** 14–6	1–5	FedExField	Recap
7	October 25	**San Diego Chargers***	**L** 7–37	1–6	Arrowhead Stadium	Recap
8	Bye					
9	November 8	at Jacksonville Jaguars	**L** 21–24	1–7	Jacksonville Municipal Stadium	Recap
10	November 15	at **Oakland Raiders***	**W** 16–10	2–7	Oakland–Alameda County Coliseum	Recap
11	November 22	Pittsburgh Steelers	**W** 27–24 (OT)	3–7	Arrowhead Stadium	Recap
12	November 29	at **San Diego Chargers**	**L** 14–43	3–8	Qualcomm Stadium	Recap
13	December 6	**Denver Broncos**	**L** 13–44	3–9	Arrowhead Stadium	Recap
14	December 13	Buffalo Bills	**L** 10–16	3–10	Arrowhead Stadium	Recap
15	December 20	Cleveland Browns	**L** 34–41	3–11	Arrowhead Stadium	Recap
16	December 27	at Cincinnati Bengals	**L** 10–17	3–12	Paul Brown Stadium	Recap
17	January 3	at **Denver Broncos**	**W** 44–24	4–12	Invesco Field at Mile High	Recap

Note: Intra-division opponents are in bold text.

* These three games were among the 16 that the NFL designated as "AFL Legacy Games", in honor of the 50th anniversary of the AFL. The Chiefs (formerly the Dallas Texans) wore their throwback uniforms during those three games, as did the Cowboys, Chargers, and Raiders.

=== Game summaries ===
==== Week 1: at Baltimore Ravens ====
Week 1: Kansas City Chiefs at Baltimore Ravens – Game summary

Quarter	1	2	3	4	Total
Chiefs	0	7	7	10	**24**
**Ravens**	10	0	7	21	**38**

at M&T Bank Stadium, Baltimore, Maryland

- Date: September 13
- Game time: 1:00 p.m. EDT/12:00 p.m. CDT
- Game weather: Partly cloudy, 76 °F (24 °C)
- Game attendance: 71,099
- Referee: Gene Steratore
- TV announcers (CBS): Ian Eagle and Rich Gannon
- Recap, Game Book

Game information

**First quarter**

- BAL – Stephen Hauschka 44-yard field goal, 10:19. Ravens 3–0. **Drive: 9 plays, 54 yards, 3:16.**
- BAL – Willis McGahee 3-yard pass from Joe Flacco (Stephen Hauschka kick), 2:04. Ravens 10–0. **Drive: 13 plays, 70 yards, 6:44.**

**Second quarter**

- KC – Jon McGraw blocked punt recovery in end zone (Ryan Succop kick), 9:55. Ravens 10–7.

**Third quarter**

- KC – Dwayne Bowe 2-yard pass from Brodie Croyle (Ryan Succop kick), 8:52. Chiefs 14–10. **Drive: 2 plays, 6 yards, 0:50.**
- BAL – Todd Heap 9-yard pass from Joe Flacco (Stephen Hauschka kick), 3:57. Ravens 17–14. **Drive: 11 plays, 64 yards, 4:55.**

**Fourth quarter**

- KC – Ryan Succop 53-yard field goal, 11:57. Tied 17–17. **Drive: 7 plays, 55 yards, 2:51.**
- BAL – LeRon McClain 1-yard run (Stephen Hauschka kick), 8:10. Ravens 24–17. **Drive: 9 plays, 76 yards, 3:47.**
- KC – Sean Ryan 10-yard pass from Brodie Croyle (Ryan Succop kick), 5:21. Tied 24–24. **Drive: 6 plays, 80 yards, 2:49.**
- BAL – Mark Clayton 31-yard pass from Joe Flacco (Stephen Hauschka kick), 2:06. Ravens 31–24. **Drive: 8 plays, 74 yards, 3:15.**
- BAL – Willis McGahee 1-yard run (Stephen Hauschka kick), 0:31. Ravens 38–24. **Drive: 4 plays, 9 yards, 1:03.**

**Top passers**

- KC – Brodie Croyle – 16/24, 177 yards, 2 TD
- BAL – Joe Flacco – 26/43, 307 yards, 3 TD, INT

**Top rushers**

- KC – Larry Johnson – 11 rushes, 20 yards
- BAL – Ray Rice – 19 rushes, 108 yards

**Top receivers**

- KC – Mark Bradley – 4 receptions, 73 yards
- BAL – Mark Clayton – 5 receptions, 77 yards, TD

The Chiefs began their season at M&T Bank Stadium against the Baltimore Ravens. Due to his injured knee, quarterback Matt Cassel was unable to play, so Brodie Croyle got the start. Despite completing 16-of-24 passes for 177 yards and two touchdowns, the Chiefs lost to the Ravens 38–24, and Croyle fell to 0–9 as a starter.

Kansas City trailed in the first quarter as Ravens kicker Steven Hauschka got a 44-yard field goal, followed by quarterback Joe Flacco completing a 3-yard touchdown pass to running back Willis McGahee. In the second quarter, the Chiefs got on the board as safety Jon McGraw recovered a blocked punt in the end zone for a touchdown. In the third quarter, Kansas City took the lead as Croyle completed a 2-yard touchdown pass to wide receiver Dwayne Bowe, yet Baltimore answered with Flacco completing a 9-yard touchdown pass to tight end Todd Heap. What followed was a back-and-forth battle in the fourth quarter. Chiefs kicker Ryan Succop got a 53-yard field goal, but the Ravens replied with fullback Le'Ron McClain getting a 1-yard touchdown run. Kansas City would stay close as Croyle completed a 10-yard touchdown pass to tight end Sean Ryan, but Baltimore would pull away as Flacco completed a 31-yard touchdown pass to wide receiver Mark Clayton and McGahee getting a 1-yard touchdown run.

With the loss, the Chiefs began their season at 0–1.

==== Week 2: vs. Oakland Raiders ====
Week 2: Oakland Raiders at Kansas City Chiefs – Game summary

Quarter	1	2	3	4	Total
**Raiders**	0	3	3	7	**13**
Chiefs	3	0	0	7	**10**

at Arrowhead Stadium, Kansas City, Missouri

- Date: September 20
- Game time: 12:00 p.m. CDT
- Game weather: Partly cloudy, 72 °F (22 °C)
- Game attendance: 69,169
- Referee: Walt Anderson
- TV announcers (CBS): Kevin Harlan and Solomon Wilcots
- Recap, Game Book

Game information

**First quarter**

- KC – Ryan Succop 23-yard field goal, 2:01. Chiefs 3–0. **Drive: 17 plays, 74 yards, 9:25.**

**Second quarter**

- OAK – Sebastian Janikowski 48-yard field goal, 4:45. Tied 3–3. **Drive: 12 plays, 58 yards, 6:49.**

**Third quarter**

- OAK – Sebastian Janikowski 54-yard field goal, 8:33. Raiders 6–3. **Drive: 7 plays, 13 yards, 2:58.**

**Fourth quarter**

- KC – Dwayne Bowe 29-yard pass from Matt Cassel (Ryan Succop kick), 2:38. Chiefs 10–6. **Drive: 9 plays, 72 yards, 4:23.**
- OAK – Darren McFadden 5-yard run (Sebastian Janikowski kick), 1:07. Raiders 13–10. **Drive: 9 plays, 69 yards, 1:31.**

**Top passers**

- OAK – JaMarcus Russell – 7/24, 109 yards
- KC – Matt Cassel – 24/39, 241 yards, TD, 2 INT

**Top rushers**

- OAK – Darren McFadden – 12 rushes, 35 yards, TD
- KC – Larry Johnson – 24 rushes, 78 yards

**Top receivers**

- OAK – Todd Watkins – 1 reception, 28 yards
- KC – Bobby Wade – 6 receptions, 72 yards

Hoping to rebound from their tough road loss to the Ravens, the Chiefs played their Week 2 home opener against their AFC West foe, the Oakland Raiders. Kansas City would score in the first quarter as rookie kicker Ryan Succop got a 23-yard field goal. In the second quarter, the Raiders tied the game as kicker Sebastian Janikowski made a 48-yard field goal. Oakland would take the lead in the third quarter as Janikowski nailed a 54-yard field goal. In the fourth quarter, the Chiefs would retake the lead as quarterback Matt Cassel completed a 29-yard touchdown pass to wide receiver Dwayne Bowe. However, the Raiders sealed the win as running back Darren McFadden got a 5-yard touchdown run.

With the loss, Kansas City fell to 0–2.

==== Week 3: at Philadelphia Eagles ====
Week 3: Kansas City Chiefs at Philadelphia Eagles – Game summary

Quarter	1	2	3	4	Total
Chiefs	0	7	0	7	**14**
**Eagles**	14	10	3	7	**34**

at Lincoln Financial Field, Philadelphia, Pennsylvania

- Date: September 27
- Game time: 1:00 p.m. EDT/12:00 p.m. CDT
- Game weather: Partly cloudy, 69 °F (21 °C)
- Game attendance: 69,144
- Referee: John Parry
- TV announcers (CBS): Kevin Harlan and Solomon Wilcots
- Recap, Game Book

Game information

**First quarter**

- PHI – LeSean McCoy 5-yard run (David Akers kick), 6:08. Eagles 7–0. **Drive: 8 plays, 48 yards, 3:10.**
- BAL – Kevin Kolb 1-yard run (David Akers kick), 1:21. Eagles 14–0. **Drive: 6 plays, 73 yards, 3:27.**

**Second quarter**

- KC – Mark Bradley 13-yard pass from Matt Cassel (Ryan Succop kick), 8:34. Eagles 14–7. **Drive: 6 plays, 56 yards, 3:20.**
- PHI – DeSean Jackson 64-yard pass from Kevin Kolb (David Akers kick), 8:16. Eagles 21–7. **Drive: 1 play, 64 yards, 0:18.**
- PHI – David Akers 29-yard field goal, 0:31. Eagles 24–7. **Drive: 14 plays, 64 yards, 5:44.**

**Third quarter**

- PHI – David Akers 38-yard field goal, 9:15. Eagles 27–7. **Drive: 8 plays, 50 yards, 3:20.**

**Fourth quarter**

- PHI – Brent Celek 35-yard pass from Kevin Kolb (David Akers kick), 6:43. Eagles 34–7. **Drive: 5 plays, 72 yards, 2:53.**
- KC – Bobby Wade 9-yard pass from Matt Cassel (Ryan Succop kick), 1:54. Eagles 34–14. **Drive: 6 plays, 20 yards, 2:41.**

**Top passers**

- KC – Matt Cassel – 14/18, 90 yards, 2 TD
- PHI – Kevin Kolb – 24/34, 327 yards, 2 TD

**Top rushers**

- KC – Larry Johnson – 19 rushes, 38 yards
- PHI – LeSean McCoy – 20 rushes, 84 yards, TD

**Top receivers**

- KC – Jamaal Charles – 3 receptions, 34 yards
- PHI – DeSean Jackson – 6 receptions, 149 yards, TD

Still searching for their first win of the season, the Chiefs flew to Lincoln Financial Field for a Week 3 interconference duel with the Philadelphia Eagles. Kansas City would trail early in the first quarter as Eagles running back LeSean McCoy got a 5-yard touchdown run and quarterback Kevin Kolb got a 1-yard touchdown run. The Chiefs would get on the board with quarterback Matt Cassel's 13-yard touchdown pass to wide receiver Mark Bradley, but Philadelphia came right back with Kolb's 64-yard touchdown pass to wide receiver DeSean Jackson and kicker David Akers' 29-yard field goal.

Kansas City's deficit would increase as Akers nailed a 38-yard field goal in the third quarter. In the fourth quarter, the Eagles would put the game away with Kolb's 35-yard touchdown pass to tight end Brent Celek. Afterwards, the Chiefs would end the game with Cassel's 9-yard touchdown pass to wide receiver Bobby Wade.

With the loss, Kansas City fell to 0–3.

==== Week 4: vs. New York Giants ====
Week 4: New York Giants at Kansas City Chiefs – Game summary

Quarter	1	2	3	4	Total
**Giants**	7	10	3	7	**27**
Chiefs	3	0	0	13	**16**

at Arrowhead Stadium, Kansas City, Missouri

- Date: October 4
- Game time: 12:00 p.m. CDT
- Game weather: Sunny, 59 °F (15 °C)
- Game attendance: 69,238
- Referee: Jerome Boger
- TV announcers (Fox): Kenny Albert, Daryl Johnston and Tony Siragusa
- Recap, Game Book

Game information

**First quarter**

- NYG – Steve Smith 3-yard pass from Eli Manning (Lawrence Tynes kick), 12:44. Giants 7–0. **Drive: 5 plays, 16 yards, 2:04.**
- KC – Ryan Succop 34-yard field goal, 4:58. Giants 7–3. **Drive: 6 plays, 20 yards, 2:35.**

**Second quarter**

- NYG – Steve Smith 25-yard pass from Eli Manning (Lawrence Tynes kick), 13:33. Giants 14–3. **Drive: 4 plays, 71 yards, 1:39.**
- NYG – Lawrence Tynes 25-yard field goal, 0:00. Giants 17–3. **Drive: 9 plays, 80 yards, 1:49.**

**Third quarter**

- NYG – Lawrence Tynes 40-yard field goal, 10:22. Giants 20–3. **Drive: 8 plays, 20 yards, 4:38.**

**Fourth quarter**

- NYG – Hakeem Nicks 54-yard pass from Eli Manning (Lawrence Tynes kick), 13:17. Giants 27–3. **Drive: 6 plays, 66 yards, 2:08.**
- KC – Sean Ryan 1-yard pass from Matt Cassel (run failed), 9:26. Giants 27–9. **Drive: 11 plays, 48 yards, 3:51.**
- KC – Bobby Wade 2-yard pass from Matt Cassel (Ryan Succop kick), 4:54. Giants 27–16. **Drive: 12 plays, 59 yards, 3:34.**

**Top passers**

- NYG – Eli Manning – 20/34, 292 yards, 3 TD, INT
- KC – Matt Cassel – 15/32, 127 yards, 2 TD

**Top rushers**

- NYG – Brandon Jacobs – 21 rushes, 92 yards
- KC – Larry Johnson – 18 rushes, 72 yards

**Top receivers**

- NYG – Steve Smith – 11 receptions, 134 yards, 2 TD
- KC – Sean Ryan – 5 receptions, 58 yards, TD

After a brutal road loss to the Eagles, the Chiefs went home for a Week 4 interconference duel with the New York Giants. Kansas City would trail in the first quarter with quarterback Eli Manning completing a 3-yard touchdown pass to wide receiver Steve Smith. Afterwards, the Chiefs would get on the board with rookie kicker Ryan Succop's 34-yard field goal. In the second quarter, New York would answer with Manning hooking up with Smith again on a 25-yard touchdown pass. Then, the Giants would close out the half with former Chiefs kicker Lawrence Tynes making a 25-yard field goal.

After Tynes' 40-yard field goal in the third quarter, New York would finish their scoring in the fourth quarter with quarterback Eli Manning's 54-yard touchdown pass to wide receiver Hakeem Nicks. Kansas City tried to rally with quarterback Matt Cassel completing a 1-yard touchdown pass to tight end Sean Ryan (followed by a failed 2-point conversion) and a 2-yard touchdown pass to wide receiver Bobby Wade.

With the loss, the Chiefs fell to 0–4.

==== Week 5: vs. Dallas Cowboys ====
Week 5: Dallas Cowboys at Kansas City Chiefs – Game summary

Quarter	1	2	3	4	OT	Total
**Cowboys**	0	3	7	10	6	**26**
Chiefs	0	10	3	7	0	**20**

at Arrowhead Stadium, Kansas City, Missouri

- Date: October 11
- Game time: 12:00 p.m. CDT
- Game weather: Overcast, 40 °F (4 °C)
- Game attendance: 71,214
- Referee: Ron Winter
- TV announcers (Fox): Joe Buck, Troy Aikman and Pam Oliver
- Recap, Game Book

Game information

**First quarter**

- No scoring plays.

**Second quarter**

- KC – Ryan Succop 47-yard field goal, 14:13. Chiefs 3–0. **Drive: 4 plays, −5 yards, 1:00.**
- KC – Mike Vrabel 1-yard pass from Matt Cassel (Ryan Succop kick), 11:00. Chiefs 10–0. **Drive: 5 plays, 16 yards, 2:19.**
- DAL – Nick Folk 22-yard field goal, 1:49. Chiefs 10–3. **Drive: 11 plays, 83 yards, 3:45.**

**Third quarter**

- KC – Ryan Succop 38-yard field goal, 6:30. Chiefs 13–3. **Drive: 9 plays, 36 yards, 1:46.**
- DAL – Tashard Choice 36-yard run (Nick Folk kick), 1:55. Chiefs 13–10. **Drive: 8 plays, 72 yards, 4:35.**

**Fourth quarter**

- DAL – Nick Folk 28-yard field goal, 11:10. Tied 13–13. **Drive: 8 plays, 66 yards, 4:04.**
- DAL – Miles Austin 59-yard pass from Tony Romo (Nick Folk kick), 2:16. Cowboys 20–13. **Drive: 3 plays, 64 yards, 0:53.**
- KC – Dwayne Bowe 16-yard pass from Matt Cassel (Ryan Succop kick), 0:24. Tied 20–20. **Drive: 10 plays, 74 yards, 1:52.**

**Overtime**

- DAL – Miles Austin 60-yard pass from Tony Romo, 8:22. Cowboys 26–20. **Drive: 3 plays, 79 yards, 1:40.**

**Top passers**

- DAL – Tony Romo – 20/34, 351 yards, 2 TD
- KC – Matt Cassel – 23/41, 253 yards, 2 TD

**Top rushers**

- DAL – Tashard Choice – 8 rushes, 92 yards, TD
- KC – Larry Johnson – 21 rushes, 37 yards

**Top receivers**

- DAL – Miles Austin – 10 receptions, 250 yards, 2 TD
- KC – Dwayne Bowe – 5 receptions, 74 yards, TD

Still looking to acquire their first win of the year, the Chiefs stayed at home, donned their Dallas Texans throwbacks, and played a Week 5 interconference duel with the Dallas Cowboys. After a scoreless first quarter, Kansas City got out of the gates in the second quarter as kicker Ryan Succop made a 47-yard field goal and quarterback Matt Cassel completed a 1-yard touchdown pass to linebacker Mike Vrabel. Afterwards, the Cowboys closed out the opening half with a 22-yard field goal from kicker Nick Folk.

The Chiefs went back to work in the third quarter with Succop booting a 38-yard field goal, yet Dallas began to rally with a 36-yard touchdown run from running back Tashard Choice. Dallas would take the lead in the fourth quarter as Folk nailed a 28-yard field goal and quarterback Tony Romo found wide receiver Miles Austin on a 59-yard touchdown pass, yet Kansas City would tie the game as Cassel hooked up with wide receiver Dwayne Bowe on a 16-yard touchdown pass. However, the Cowboys won it in overtime as Romo threw the game-ending 60-yard touchdown pass to Austin.

With the tough loss, the Chiefs fell to 0–5.

==== Week 6: at Washington Redskins ====
Week 6: Kansas City Chiefs at Washington Redskins – Game summary

Quarter	1	2	3	4	Total
**Chiefs**	0	3	3	8	**14**
Redskins	0	0	6	0	**6**

at FedExField, Landover, Maryland

- Date: October 18
- Game time: 1:00 p.m. EDT/12:00 p.m. CDT
- Game weather: Cloudy, 45 °F (7 °C)
- Game attendance: 79,572
- Referee: Tony Corrente
- TV announcers (CBS): Ian Eagle and Rich Gannon
- Recap, Game Book

Game information

**First quarter**

- No scoring plays.

**Second quarter**

- KC – Ryan Succop 39-yard field goal, 5:34. Chiefs 3–0. **Drive: 10 plays, 65 yards, 4:46.**

**Third quarter**

- WAS – Shaun Suisham 40-yard field goal, 11:17. Tied 3–3. **Drive: 6 plays, 48 yards, 3:43.**
- WAS – Shaun Suisham 28-yard field goal, 6:01. Redskins 6–3. **Drive: 5 plays, 78 yards, 1:03.**
- KC – Ryan Succop 46-yard field goal, 1:07. Tied 6–6. **Drive: 9 plays, 42 yards, 4:54.**

**Fourth quarter**

- KC – Ryan Succop 46-yard field goal, 3:36. Chiefs 9–6. **Drive: 6 plays, 9 yards, 2:19.**
- KC – Ryan Succop 24-yard field goal, 0:37. Chiefs 12–6. **Drive: 6 plays, 31 yards, 1:15.**
- KC – Todd Collins sacked in end zone by Tamba Hali for a Safety, 0:26. Chiefs 14–6.

**Top passers**

- KC – Matt Cassel – 16/31, 186 yards
- WAS – Jason Campbell – 9/16, 89 yards, INT

**Top rushers**

- KC – Larry Johnson – 23 rushes, 83 yards
- WAS – Clinton Portis – 15 rushes, 109 yards

**Top receivers**

- KC – Dwayne Bowe – 6 receptions, 109 yards
- WAS – Chris Cooley – 5 receptions, 57 yards

Following a tough overtime loss to the Cowboys, the Chiefs flew to FedExField for a Week 6 interconference duel with the Washington Redskins.

After a scoreless first quarter, Chiefs kicker Ryan Succop booted a 39-yard field goal for the only score of the half. In the third quarter, the Redskins took the lead with a 40-yard and a 28-yard field goal from kicker Shaun Suisham, but Kansas City tied it up with Succop's 46-yard field goal. In the fourth quarter, Succop gave the Chiefs the lead with a 46-yard and a 24-yard field, but it was the defense that closed the game out for Kansas City, as DE/OLB Tamba Hali sacked quarterback Todd Collins in his own end zone for a safety with under a minute to play.

With the win, the Chiefs improved to 1–5.

==== Week 7: vs. San Diego Chargers ====
Week 7: San Diego Chargers at Kansas City Chiefs – Game summary

Quarter	1	2	3	4	Total
**Chargers**	14	6	7	10	**37**
Chiefs	0	0	7	0	**7**

at Arrowhead Stadium, Kansas City, Missouri

- Date: October 25
- Game time: 12:00 p.m. CDT
- Game weather: Overcast, 58 °F (14 °C)
- Game attendance: 69,337
- Referee: Pete Morelli
- TV announcers (CBS): Dick Enberg and Dan Fouts
- Recap, Game Book

Game information

**First quarter**

- SD – Malcom Floyd 3-yard pass from Philip Rivers (Nate Kaeding kick), 7:32. Chargers 7–0. **Drive: 10 plays, 80 yards, 5:00.**
- SD – Vincent Jackson 10-yard pass from Philip Rivers (Nate Kaeding kick), 1:23. Chargers 14–0. **Drive: 8 plays, 41 yards, 3:32.**

**Second quarter**

- SD – Nate Kaeding 20-yard field goal, 9:49. Chargers 17–0. **Drive: 10 plays, 82 yards, 5:27.**
- SD – Nate Kaeding 39-yard field goal, 0:01. Chargers 20–0. **Drive: 7 plays, 45 yards, 1:06.**

**Third quarter**

- KC – Dwayne Bowe 7-yard pass from Matt Cassel (Ryan Succop kick), 9:48. Chargers 20–7. **Drive: 10 plays, 65 yards, 5:12.**
- SD – Darren Sproles 58-yard pass from Philip Rivers (Nate Kaeding kick), 5:45. Chargers 27–7. **Drive: 3 plays, 64 yards, 1:26.**

**Fourth quarter**

- SD – Nate Kaeding 19-yard field goal, 11:37. Chargers 30–7. **Drive: 6 plays, 17 yards, 2:36.**
- SD – Jacob Hester blocked punt recovery in end zone (Nate Kaeding kick), 9:13. Chargers 37–7.

**Top passers**

- SD – Philip Rivers – 18/30, 267 yards, 3 TD
- KC – Matt Cassel – 10/25, 97 yards, TD, 3 INT

**Top rushers**

- SD – LaDainian Tomlinson – 23 rushes, 71 yards
- KC – Larry Johnson – 16 rushes, 49 yards

**Top receivers**

- SD – Vincent Jackson – 5 receptions, 142 yards, TD
- KC – Bobby Wade – 4 receptions, 66 yards

Coming off their road win over the Redskins, the Chiefs went home, donned their Dallas Texans throwbacks, and played a Week 7 AFL Legacy game with the San Diego Chargers. Kansas City would find themselves trailing in the first quarter as Chargers quarterback Philip Rivers completed a 3-yard touchdown pass to wide receiver Malcom Floyd, followed by a 10-yard touchdown pass to wide receiver Vincent Jackson. San Diego would add onto their lead in the second quarter with a 20-yard and a 39-yard field goal from kicker Nate Kaeding.

The Chiefs would get onto the board in the third quarter with quarterback Matt Cassel completing a 7-yard touchdown pass to wide receiver Dwayne Bowe, but the Chargers kept their momentum going with Rivers finding running back Darren Sproles on a 58-yard touchdown pass. In the fourth quarter, San Diego sealed the win with Kaeding's 19-yard field goal and fullback Jacob Hester recovering a blocked punt in the end zone for a touchdown.

With the loss, Kansas City went into their bye week at 1–6.

==== Suspension of Larry Johnson ====
Larry Johnson was suspended for two weeks after he made offensive comments about Todd Haley and made offensive comments about homosexuals on Twitter and in public.

==== Week 9: at Jacksonville Jaguars ====
Week 9: Kansas City Chiefs at Jacksonville Jaguars – Game summary

Quarter	1	2	3	4	Total
Chiefs	3	3	0	15	**21**
**Jaguars**	7	7	3	7	**24**

at Jacksonville Municipal Stadium, Jacksonville, Florida

- Date: November 8
- Game time: 1:00 p.m. EST/12:00 p.m. CST
- Game weather: Sunny, 75 °F (24 °C)
- Game attendance: 45,546
- Referee: Bill Leavy
- TV announcers (CBS): Bill Macatee and Steve Beuerlein
- Recap, Game Book

Game information

**First quarter**

- KC – Ryan Succop 45-yard field goal, 9:54. Chiefs 3–0. **Drive: 6 plays, 29 yards, 2:53.**
- JAX – Rashad Jennings 28-yard run (Josh Scobee kick), 4:33. Jaguars 7–3. **Drive: 9 plays, 79 yards, 5:31.**

**Second quarter**

- KC – Ryan Succop 21-yard field goal, 2:38. Jaguars 7–6. **Drive: 5 plays, 17 yards, 2:19.**
- JAX – Mike Sims-Walker 61-yard pass from David Garrard (Josh Scobee kick), 1:02. Jaguars 14–6. **Drive: 5 plays, 84 yards, 1:36.**

**Third quarter**

- JAX – Josh Scobee 27-yard field goal, 0:47. Jaguars 17–6. **Drive: 10 plays, 68 yards, 5:22.**

**Fourth quarter**

- JAX – Maurice Jones-Drew 10-yard run (Josh Scobee kick), 4:26. Jaguars 24–6. **Drive: 5 plays, 22 yards, 2:41.**
- KC – Chris Chambers 54-yard pass from Matt Cassel (Ryan Succop kick), 2:32. Jaguars 24–13. **Drive: 6 plays, 71 yards, 1:54.**
- KC – Chris Chambers 5-yard pass from Matt Cassel (Matt Cassel–Jamaal Charles pass), 1:01. Jaguars 24–21. **Drive: 8 plays, 68 yards, 1:31.**

**Top passers**

- KC – Matt Cassel – 23/39, 262 yards, 2 TD
- JAX – David Garrard – 18/27, 264 yards, TD

**Top rushers**

- KC – Jamaal Charles – 6 rushes, 36 yards
- JAX – Maurice Jones-Drew – 29 rushes, 97 yards, TD

**Top receivers**

- KC – Dwayne Bowe – 4 receptions, 74 yards
- JAX – Mike Sims-Walker – 6 receptions, 147 yards, TD

After their bye week, the Chiefs flew to Jacksonville Municipal Stadium for an Intraconference Duel with the Jaguars. While the Chiefs got on the board first with Ryan Succop nailing a 45-yard goal, they fell behind when Rashad Jennings ran from the 28-yard line to the end zone for a touchdown. In the second quarter Ryan Succop made a 21-yard field goal, and then the Jaguars scored when David Garrard completed a 61-yard touchdown pass to Mike Sims-Walker. The only score in the third quarter was when Josh Scobee hit a 27-yard field goal. In the fourth quarter the Chiefs fell further behind when Maurice Jones-Drew got a 10-yard touchdown run. The Chiefs tried to come back with Matt Cassel completing a 54-yard and a 5-yard touchdown pass to Chris Chambers (Second time round the two-point conversion was made when Matt Cassel passed to Jamaal Charles) but couldn't go any further thanks to the Jaguars' defense resulting in a loss.

With the loss, the Chiefs fell to 1–7.

==== Week 10: at Oakland Raiders ====
Week 10: Kansas City Chiefs at Oakland Raiders – Game summary

Quarter	1	2	3	4	Total
**Chiefs**	3	10	0	3	**16**
Raiders	10	0	0	0	**10**

at Oakland–Alameda County Coliseum, Oakland, California

- Date: November 15
- Game time: 3:05 p.m. CST/1:05 p.m. PST
- Game weather: Sunny skies, 60 °F (16 °C)
- Game attendance: 40,720
- Referee: Mike Carey
- TV announcers (CBS): Gus Johnson and Steve Tasker
- Recap, Game Book

Game information

**First quarter**

- OAK – Justin Fargas 1-yard run (Sebastian Janikowski kick), 12:42. Raiders 7–0. **Drive: 4 plays, 70 yards, 2:18.**
- KC – Ryan Succop 50-yard field goal, 4:49. Raiders 7–3. **Drive: 5 plays, 36 yards, 1:27.**
- OAK – Sebastian Janikowski 50-yard field goal, 2:10. Raiders 10–3. **Drive: 4 plays, 5 yards, 1:36.**

**Second quarter**

- KC – Jamaal Charles 44-yard run (Ryan Succop kick), 12:25. Tied 10–10. **Drive: 6 plays, 66 yards, 1:42.**
- KC – Ryan Succop 25-yard field goal, 6:48. Chiefs 13–10. **Drive: 7 plays, 67 yards, 2:52.**

**Third quarter**

- No scoring plays.

**Fourth quarter**

- KC – Ryan Succop 31-yard field goal, 6:17. Chiefs 16–10. **Drive: 8 plays, 34 yards, 4:55.**

**Top passers**

- KC – Matt Cassel – 19/34, 216 yards, INT
- OAK – JaMarcus Russell – 8/23, 64 yards

**Top rushers**

- KC – Jamaal Charles – 18 rushes, 103 yards, TD
- OAK – Michael Bush – 14 rushes, 119 yards

**Top receivers**

- KC – Dwayne Bowe – 6 receptions, 91 yards
- OAK – Johnnie Lee Higgins – 4 receptions, 41 yards

Trying to snap a two-game losing streak, the Chiefs flew to the Oakland–Alameda County Coliseum, donned their Dallas Texans throwbacks, and played a Week 10 AFC Legacy game with perennial rival, the Oakland Raiders. Kansas City would trail in the first quarter as Raiders running back Justin Fargas got a 1-yard touchdown run. The Chiefs would get on the board with rookie kicker Ryan Succop getting a 50-yard field goal, but Oakland would strike back as kicker Sebastian Janikowski got a 50-yard field goal. Kansas City would take the lead in the second quarter with a 44-yard touchdown run from running back Jamaal Charles, followed by Succop nailing a 25-yard field goal. After a scoreless third quarter, Succop would come through for the Chiefs in the fourth quarter with a 31-yard field goal.

With the win, Kansas City improved to 2–7.

==== Week 11: vs. Pittsburgh Steelers ====
Week 11: Pittsburgh Steelers at Kansas City Chiefs – Game summary

Quarter	1	2	3	4	OT	Total
Steelers	0	17	0	7	0	**24**
**Chiefs**	7	0	10	7	3	**27**

at Arrowhead Stadium, Kansas City, Missouri

- Date: November 22
- Game time: 12:00 p.m. CST
- Game weather: Cloudy, 55 °F (13 °C)
- Game attendance: 70,261
- Referee: Carl Cheffers
- TV announcers (CBS): Ian Eagle and Rich Gannon
- Recap, Game Book

Game information

**First quarter**

- KC – Jamaal Charles 97-yard kickoff return (Ryan Succop kick), 14:44. Chiefs 7–0.

**Second quarter**

- PIT – Jeff Reed 36-yard field goal, 14:50. Chiefs 7–3. **Drive: 12 plays, 62 yards, 7:03.**
- PIT – Hines Ward 8-yard pass from Ben Roethlisberger (Jeff Reed kick), 5:32. Steelers 10–7. **Drive: 10 plays, 95 yards, 5:55.**
- PIT – Heath Miller 10-yard pass from Ben Roethlisberger (Jeff Reed kick), 1:10. Steelers 17–7. **Drive: 7 plays, 46 yards, 3:06.**

**Third quarter**

- KC – Leonard Pope 21-yard pass from Matt Cassel (Ryan Succop kick), 10:48. Steelers 17–14. **Drive: 7 plays, 62 yards, 2:23.**
- KC – Ryan Succop 27-yard field goal, 0:05. Tied 17–17. **Drive: 4 plays, −1 yard, 1:35.**

**Fourth quarter**

- PIT – Rashard Mendenhall 8-yard pass from Ben Roethlisberger (Jeff Reed kick), 8:35. Steelers 24–17. **Drive: 5 plays, 27 yards, 2:28.**
- KC – Jamaal Charles 2-yard pass from Matt Cassel (Ryan Succop kick), 4:54. Tied 24–24. **Drive: 8 plays, 91 yards, 3:41.**

**Overtime**

- KC – Ryan Succop 22-yard field goal, 8:28. Chiefs 27–24. **Drive: 5 plays, 76 yards, 1:32.**

**Top passers**

- PIT – Ben Roethlisberger – 32/42, 398 yards, 3 TD, 2 INT
- KC – Matt Cassel – 15/30, 248 yards, 2 TD

**Top rushers**

- PIT – Rashard Mendenhall – 21 rushes, 80 yards
- KC – Jamaal Charles – 17 rushes, 58 yards

**Top receivers**

- PIT – Hines Ward – 10 receptions, 128 yards, TD
- KC – Chris Chambers – 4 receptions, 119 yards

The Chiefs returned home to host the Steelers in an attempt to create the biggest upset of the week and get their first back-to-back wins since 2007. Optimism grew quickly as Jamaal Charles ran the opening kick 97 yards for a touchdown, starting the game with a 7–0 Chiefs lead.

The Steelers dominated the rest of the first half with 20:45 time of possession, going into halftime with a 17–7 lead. The Chiefs' defense began to pressure Ben Roethlisberger in the third quarter, forcing two interceptions (both by Andy Studebaker in his first NFL start). By the fourth quarter, the Chiefs tied the game up at 17–17. The fourth quarter resulted in a touchdown each, sending the game into overtime.

The Steelers won the toss in overtime, but failed to get within field goal range. Of note, Roethlisberger suffered a knee to the head concussion and was replaced by Charlie Batch. The Chiefs took over at the 20 and, after a 61-yard catch and run by Chris Chambers, Ryan Succop kicked the winning 22-yard field goal. With the win, the Chiefs improved to 3–7 and snapped a 10-game home losing streak, the longest in team history.

==== Week 12: at San Diego Chargers ====
Week 12: Kansas City Chiefs at San Diego Chargers – Game summary

Quarter	1	2	3	4	Total
Chiefs	0	7	7	0	**14**
**Chargers**	7	21	10	5	**43**

at Qualcomm Stadium, San Diego, California

- Date: November 29
- Game time: 3:05 p.m. CST/1:05 p.m. PST
- Game weather: Sunny, 63 °F (17 °C)
- Game attendance: 65,280
- Referee: Don Carey
- TV announcers (CBS): Dick Enberg and Dan Fouts
- Recap, Game Book

Game information

**First quarter**

- SD – Antonio Gates 19-yard pass from Philip Rivers (Nate Kaeding kick), 4:13. Chargers 7–0. **Drive: 7 plays, 61 yards, 3:35.**

**Second quarter**

- KC – Chris Chambers 7-yard pass from Matt Cassel (Ryan Succop kick), 10:46. Tied 7–7. **Drive: 8 plays, 91 yards, 3:20.**
- SD – LaDainian Tomlinson 1-yard run (Nate Kaeding kick), 10:05. Chargers 14–7. **Drive: 3 plays, 70 yards, 0:41.**
- SD – Antonio Gates 15-yard pass from Philip Rivers (Nate Kaeding kick), 2:52. Chargers 21–7. **Drive: 7 plays, 61 yards, 4:12.**
- SD – Paul Oliver 40-yard fumble return (Nate Kaeding kick), 2:32. Chargers 28–7.

**Third quarter**

- SD – LaDainian Tomlinson 3-yard run (Nate Kaeding kick), 12:58. Chargers 35–7. **Drive: 2 plays, 10 yards, 0:47.**
- KC – Jamaal Charles 4-yard run (Ryan Succop kick), 9:45. Chargers 35–14. **Drive: 8 plays, 79 yards, 3:13.**
- SD – Nate Kaeding 55-yard field goal, 4:27. Chargers 38–14. **Drive: 8 plays, 27 yards, 5:18.**

**Fourth quarter**

- SD – Penalty on Matt Cassel enforced in end zone for a Safety, 12:45. Chargers 40–14.
- SD – Nate Kaeding 23-yard field goal, 5:08. Chargers 43–14. **Drive: 12 plays, 60 yards, 7:37.**

**Top passers**

- KC – Matt Cassel – 19/31, 178 yards, TD, INT
- SD – Philip Rivers – 21/28, 317 yards, 2 TD

**Top rushers**

- KC – Jamaal Charles – 14 rushes, 93 yards, TD
- SD – LaDainian Tomlinson – 13 rushes, 39 yards, 2 TD

**Top receivers**

- KC – Chris Chambers – 7 receptions, 70 yards, TD
- SD – Antonio Gates – 7 receptions, 118 yards, 2 TD

Coming off their win against the Steelers, the Chiefs went on the road for an AFC West rivalry match against the San Diego Chargers. In the first quarter the Chiefs trailed early as QB Philip Rivers got a 19-yard touchdown pass to TE Antonio Gates. The Chiefs would reply to tie the game with QB Matt Cassel making a 7-yard touchdown pass to WR Chris Chambers, until they fell back again with RB LaDainian Tomlinson getting a 1-yard touchdown run, then Rivers hooking up with Gates again on a 15-yard touchdown pass, then DB Paul Oliver returned a fumble 40 yards for a touchdown.

In the third quarter the Chiefs' struggle continued as RB LaDainian Tomlinson got a 3-yard touchdown run. They tried to come back with RB Jamaal Charles getting a 2-yard touchdown run, but the Chargers would pull away with kicker Nate Kaeding making a 55-yard field goal. In the fourth quarter the problem got worse when a penalty on Matt Cassel was enforced in the end zone for a safety, giving the Chargers 2 points. The final score was made when Kaeding booted a 23-yard field goal.

With the loss, the Chiefs fell to 3–8.

==== Week 13: vs. Denver Broncos ====
Week 13: Denver Broncos at Kansas City Chiefs – Game summary

Quarter	1	2	3	4	Total
**Broncos**	7	7	20	10	**44**
Chiefs	0	6	0	7	**13**

at Arrowhead Stadium, Kansas City, Missouri

- Date: December 6
- Game time: 12:00 p.m. CST
- Game weather: Overcast, 37 °F (3 °C)
- Game attendance: 68,912
- Referee: Jeff Triplette
- TV announcers (CBS): Dick Enberg and Dan Fouts
- Recap, Game Book

Game information

**First quarter**

- DEN – Daniel Graham 7-yard pass from Kyle Orton (Matt Prater kick), 7:20. Broncos 7–0. **Drive: 8 plays, 63 yards, 3:28.**

**Second quarter**

- KC – Ryan Succop 22-yard field goal, 14:22. Broncos 7–3. **Drive: 20 plays, 65 yards, 7:57.**
- DEN – Knowshon Moreno 2-yard run (Matt Prater kick), 7:03. Broncos 14–3. **Drive: 8 plays, 80 yards, 4:33.**
- KC – Ryan Succop 47-yard field goal, 0:23. Broncos 14–6. **Drive: 5 plays, 20 yards, 0:37.**

**Third quarter**

- DEN – Matt Prater 44-yard field goal, 13:16. Broncos 17–6. **Drive: 4 plays, 1 yard, 0:47.**
- DEN – Brandon Marshall 7-yard pass from Kyle Orton (Matt Prater kick), 10:31. Broncos 24–6. **Drive: 4 plays, 21 yards, 1:50.**
- DEN – Matt Prater 38-yard field goal, 5:53. Broncos 27–6. **Drive: 6 plays, 22 yards, 2:41.**
- DEN – André Goodman 30-yard fumble return (Matt Prater kick), 2:41. Broncos 34–6.

**Fourth quarter**

- KC – Jamaal Charles 4-yard run (Ryan Succop kick), 14:57. Broncos 34–13. **Drive: 2 plays, 3 yards, 0:05.**
- DEN – Knowshon Moreno 18-yard run (Matt Prater kick), 12:05. Broncos 41–13. **Drive: 7 plays, 80 yards, 2:52.**
- DEN – Matt Prater 37-yard field goal, 8:49. Broncos 44–13. **Drive: 5 plays, 21 yards, 2:37.**

**Top passers**

- DEN – Kyle Orton – 15/42, 180 yards, 2 TD, INT
- KC – Matt Cassel – 10/29, 84 yards, 2 INT

**Top rushers**

- DEN – Correll Buckhalter – 12 rushes, 113 yards
- KC – Jamaal Charles – 18 rushes, 56 yards, TD

**Top receivers**

- DEN – Brandon Marshall – 7 receptions, 94 yards, TD
- KC – Bobby Wade – 4 receptions, 36 yards

The Chiefs defense began the game by demonstrating how unpredictable they have been all season. After giving up three plays of 10 yards or more, Mike Brown intercepted what would likely have been a touchdown pass, giving the Chiefs offense a chance to take the field. After a short run and two incomplete passes, the Chiefs punted back to Denver. The Chiefs defense nearly forced the Broncos to a three-and-out, but the drive was kept going by a Ron Edwards face mask call. The result was a Kyle Orton to Daniel Graham touchdown pass.

The Chiefs offense responded by putting together a relatively long series that began at the KC 31 and lasted 20 plays, ending in a 22-yard Ryan Succop field goal. After a couple possession changes, the Broncos answered with a series that included three Correll Buckhalter rushes for over 10 yards, ending in a Knowshon Moreno rushing touchdown. The Chiefs would respond before the half with another field goal.

The second began with the Chiefs failing to convert on fourth down and the Broncos scoring on each of their first three possessions. Before the end of the quarter, Matt Cassel was replaced by Brodie Croyle. After the Chiefs lost a Jamaal Charles fumble for a touchdown, they recovered a Kyle Orton fumble and eventually turned it into a Jamal Charles rushing touchdown. The Broncos immediately responded with yet another touchdown.

With the loss, the Chiefs fall to 3–9.

==== Week 14: vs. Buffalo Bills ====
Week 14: Buffalo Bills at Kansas City Chiefs – Game summary

Quarter	1	2	3	4	Total
**Bills**	7	3	3	3	**16**
Chiefs	0	3	7	0	**10**

at Arrowhead Stadium, Kansas City, Missouri

- Date: December 13
- Game time: 12:00 p.m. CST
- Game weather: Mostly cloudy, 42 °F (6 °C)
- Game attendance: 68,668
- Referee: Alberto Riveron
- TV announcers (CBS): Bill Macatee and Steve Beuerlein
- Recap, Game Book

Game information

**First quarter**

- BUF – Terrell Owens 9-yard pass from Ryan Fitzpatrick (Rian Lindell kick), 0:04. Bills 7–0. **Drive: 8 plays, 92 yards, 3:50.**

**Second quarter**

- KC – Ryan Succop 22-yard field goal, 10:25. Bills 7–3. **Drive: 13 plays, 74 yards, 4:39.**
- BUF – Rian Lindell 41-yard field goal, 1:10. Bills 10–3. **Drive: 10 plays, 57 yards, 4:20.**

**Third quarter**

- BUF – Rian Lindell 24-yard field goal, 3:10. Bills 13–3. **Drive: 11 plays, 50 yards, 6:00.**
- KC – Jamaal Charles 76-yard run (Ryan Succop kick), 2:53. Bills 13–10. **Drive: 1 play, 76 yards, 0:17.**

**Fourth quarter**

- BUF – Rian Lindell 36-yard field goal, 8:01. Bills 16–10. **Drive: 7 plays, 17 yards, 3:21.**

**Top passers**

- BUF – Ryan Fitzpatrick – 12/20, 86 yards, TD, INT
- KC – Matt Cassel – 26/43, 224 yards, 4 INT

**Top rushers**

- BUF – Fred Jackson – 20 rushes, 99 yards
- KC – Jamaal Charles – 20 rushes, 143 yards, TD

**Top receivers**

- BUF – Fred Jackson – 3 receptions, 23 yards
- KC – Chris Chambers – 4 receptions, 50 yards

With the loss, the Chiefs fell to 3–10.

==== Week 15: vs. Cleveland Browns ====
Week 15: Cleveland Browns at Kansas City Chiefs – Game summary

Quarter	1	2	3	4	Total
**Browns**	10	10	7	14	**41**
Chiefs	3	21	0	10	**34**

at Arrowhead Stadium, Kansas City, Missouri

- Date: December 20
- Game time: 12:00 p.m. CST
- Game weather: Partly cloudy, 39 °F (4 °C)
- Game attendance: 53,315
- Referee: Gene Steratore
- TV announcers (CBS): Ian Eagle and Rich Gannon (blacked out locally)
- Recap, Game Book

Game information

**First quarter**

- CLE – Phil Dawson 47-yard field goal, 10:18. Browns 3–0. **Drive: 12 plays, 46 yards, 4:47.**
- KC – Ryan Succop 30-yard field goal, 4:15. Tied 3–3. **Drive: 6 plays, 37 yards, 1:58.**
- CLE – Josh Cribbs 100-yard kickoff return (Phil Dawson kick), 3:56. Browns 10–3.

**Second quarter**

- CLE – Phil Dawson 30-yard field goal, 12:36. Browns 13–3. **Drive: 9 plays, 40 yards, 4:32.**
- KC – Chris Chambers 9-yard pass from Matt Cassel (Ryan Succop kick), 10:04. Browns 13–10. **Drive: 6 plays, 72 yards, 2:28.**
- KC – Jamaal Charles 47-yard run (Ryan Succop kick), 4:10. Chiefs 17–13. **Drive: 5 plays, 85 yards, 2:36.**
- KC – Andy Studebaker fumble recovery in end zone (Ryan Succop kick), 2:44. Chiefs 24–13.
- CLE – Josh Cribbs 103-yard kickoff return (Phil Dawson kick), 2:31. Chiefs 24–20.

**Third quarter**

- CLE – Jerome Harrison 71-yard run (Phil Dawson kick), 13:16. Browns 27–24. **Drive: 2 plays, 82 yards, 0:43.**

**Fourth quarter**

- CLE – Jerome Harrison 8-yard run (Phil Dawson kick), 12:09. Browns 34–24. **Drive: 14 plays, 79 yards, 8:09.**
- KC – Ryan Succop 27-yard field goal, 8:12. Browns 34–27. **Drive: 11 plays, 64 yards, 4:01.**
- KC – Mark Bradley 12-yard pass from Matt Cassel (Ryan Succop kick), 2:20. Tied 34–34. **Drive: 8 plays, 58 yards, 2:06.**
- CLE – Jerome Harrison 28-yard run (Phil Dawson kick), 0:44. Browns 41–34. **Drive: 6 plays, 70 yards, 1:36.**

**Top passers**

- CLE – Brady Quinn – 10/17, 66 yards, 2 INT
- KC – Matt Cassel – 22/40, 331 yards, 2 TD

**Top rushers**

- CLE – Jerome Harrison – 34 rushes, 286 yards, 3 TD
- KC – Jamaal Charles – 25 rushes, 154 yards, TD

**Top receivers**

- CLE – Chansi Stuckey – 5 receptions, 41 yards
- KC – Chris Chambers – 5 receptions, 114 yards, TD

The game was the first home blackout for the Chiefs since 1990. With the loss, the Chiefs fell to 3–11.

==== Week 16: at Cincinnati Bengals ====
Week 16: Kansas City Chiefs at Cincinnati Bengals – Game summary

Quarter	1	2	3	4	Total
Chiefs	0	3	0	7	**10**
**Bengals**	0	3	7	7	**17**

at Paul Brown Stadium, Cincinnati, Ohio

- Date: December 27
- Game time: 1:00 p.m. EST/12:00 p.m. CST
- Game weather: Partly cloudy, 41 °F (5 °C)
- Game attendance: 64,333
- Referee: Ed Hochuli
- TV announcers (CBS): Dave Ryan and Steve Tasker
- Recap, Game Book

Game information

**First quarter**

- No scoring plays.

**Second quarter**

- CIN – Shayne Graham 29-yard field goal, 1:38. Bengals 3–0. **Drive: 4 plays, −4 yards, 0:45.**
- KC – Ryan Succop 30-yard field goal, 0:05. Tied 3–3. **Drive: 13 plays, 69 yards, 1:33.**

**Third quarter**

- CIN – Laveranues Coles 10-yard pass from Carson Palmer (Shayne Graham kick), 9:10. Bengals 10–3. **Drive: 10 plays, 77 yards, 5:50.**

**Fourth quarter**

- KC – Tim Castille 20-yard pass from Matt Cassel (Ryan Succop kick), 14:52. Tied 10–10. **Drive: 8 plays, 49 yards, 2:23.**
- CIN – Chad Ochocinco 6-yard pass from Carson Palmer (Shayne Graham kick), 2:03. Bengals 17–10. **Drive: 14 plays, 98 yards, 7:18.**

**Top passers**

- KC – Matt Cassel – 22/37, 180 yards, TD, 2 INT
- CIN – Carson Palmer – 17/25, 139 yards, 2 TD, INT

**Top rushers**

- KC – Jamaal Charles – 24 rushes, 102 yards
- CIN – Cedric Benson – 29 rushes, 133 yards

**Top receivers**

- KC – Dwayne Bowe – 9 receptions, 61 yards
- CIN – Laveranues Coles – 3 receptions, 43 yards, TD

With the loss, the Chiefs fell to 3–12.

==== Week 17: at Denver Broncos ====
Week 17: Kansas City Chiefs at Denver Broncos – Game summary

Quarter	1	2	3	4	Total
**Chiefs**	7	3	17	17	**44**
Broncos	0	10	14	0	**24**

at Invesco Field at Mile High, Denver, Colorado

- Date: January 3
- Game time: 3:15 p.m. CST/2:15 p.m. MST
- Game weather: Mostly cloudy, 36 °F (2 °C)
- Game attendance: 73,725
- Referee: Scott Green
- TV announcers (CBS): Dick Enberg and Dan Fouts
- Recap, Game Book

Game information

**First quarter**

- KC – Mike Cox 1-yard run (Ryan Succop kick), 11:17. Chiefs 7–0. **Drive: 4 plays, 86 yards, 1:53.**

**Second quarter**

- DEN – Knowshon Moreno 1-yard run (Matt Prater kick), 14:07. Tied 7–7. **Drive: 10 plays, 95 yards, 4:27.**
- KC – Ryan Succop 20-yard field goal, 5:03. Chiefs 10–7. **Drive: 10 plays, 78 yards, 5:03.**
- DEN – Matt Prater 25-yard field goal, 0:27. Tied 10–10. **Drive: 11 plays, 74 yards, 4:36.**

**Third quarter**

- KC – Jamaal Charles 5-yard run (Ryan Succop kick), 10:35. Chiefs 17–10. **Drive: 10 plays, 79 yards, 4:25.**
- DEN – Knowshon Moreno 1-yard run (Matt Prater kick), 8:25. Tied 17–17. **Drive: 4 plays, 73 yards, 2:10.**
- KC – Ryan Succop 36-yard field goal, 5:39. Chiefs 20–17. **Drive: 6 plays, 62 yards, 2:46.**
- KC – Derrick Johnson 45-yard interception return (Ryan Succop kick), 5:16. Chiefs 27–17.
- DEN – Brandon Stokley 3-yard pass from Kyle Orton (Matt Prater kick), 0:12. Chiefs 27–24. **Drive: 3 plays, 3 yards, 0:52.**

**Fourth quarter**

- KC – Ryan Succop 47-yard field goal, 12:57. Chiefs 30–24. **Drive: 7 plays, 51 yards, 2:15.**
- KC – Derrick Johnson 60-yard interception return (Ryan Succop kick), 9:52. Chiefs 37–24.
- KC – Jamaal Charles 56-yard run (Ryan Succop kick), 6:25. Chiefs 44–24. **Drive: 3 plays, 78 yards, 1:34.**

**Top passers**

- KC – Matt Cassel – 13/24, 207 yards, INT
- DEN – Kyle Orton – 32/56, 431 yards, TD, 3 INT

**Top rushers**

- KC – Jamaal Charles – 25 rushes, 259 yards, 2 TD
- DEN – Knowshon Moreno – 14 rushes, 50 yards, 2 TD

**Top receivers**

- KC – Chris Chambers – 5 receptions, 80 yards
- DEN – Jabar Gaffney – 14 receptions, 213 yards

With the win, the Chiefs finished their season at 4–12. Also, it was 1 of 3 games to help the Steelers get into the playoffs. However, the Ravens beat the Raiders and the Jets beat the Bengals that same week.

=== Standings ===
==== Division ====
AFC West
	W	L	T	PCT	DIV	CONF	PF	PA	STK
^{(2)} San Diego Chargers	13	3	0	.813	5–1	9–3	454	320	W11
Denver Broncos	8	8	0	.500	3–3	6–6	326	324	L4
Oakland Raiders	5	11	0	.313	2–4	4–8	197	379	L2
Kansas City Chiefs	4	12	0	.250	2–4	3–9	294	424	W1

==== Conference ====
AFC
#	Team	Division	W	L	T	PCT	DIV	CONF	SOS	SOV	STK
**Division leaders**
1	Indianapolis Colts	South	14	2	0	.875	6–0	10–2	.473	.470	L2
2	San Diego Chargers	West	13	3	0	.813	5–1	9–3	.453	.433	W11
3 (Note: New England clinched the AFC No. 3 seed based on strength of victory.)	New England Patriots	East	10	6	0	.625	4–2	7–5	.516	.450	L1
4	Cincinnati Bengals	North	10	6	0	.625	6–0	7–5	.492	.438	L1
**Wild Cards**
5 (Note: NY Jets clinched the AFC No. 5 seed based on better record in common games after Houston was eliminated from the three-way tiebreaker based on better conference record.)	New York Jets	East	9	7	0	.563	2–4	7–5	.516	.507	W2
6 (Note: Baltimore finished in second place in the AFC North based on division record.) (Note: Baltimore clinched the AFC No. 6 seed based on conference record. Division tiebreaker was initially used to eliminate Pittsburgh (see below).)	Baltimore Ravens	North	9	7	0	.563	3–3	7–5	.523	.403	W1
**Did not qualify for the postseason**
7	Houston Texans	South	9	7	0	.563	1–5	6–6	.504	.417	W4
8 (Note: Pittsburgh did not qualify as a Wild Card based on the first tiebreaking step for three or more clubs which reads, "Apply division tie breaker to eliminate all but the highest ranked club in each division prior to proceeding to Step 2".)	Pittsburgh Steelers	North	9	7	0	.563	2–4	6–6	.488	.521	W3
9 (Note: Denver finished ahead of Tennessee based on a better conference record.)	Denver Broncos	West	8	8	0	.500	3–3	6–6	.527	.516	L4
10	Tennessee Titans	South	8	8	0	.500	2–4	4–8	.539	.414	W1
11 (Note: Miami finished ahead of Jacksonville based on a head-to-head victory.)	Miami Dolphins	East	7	9	0	.438	4–2	5–7	.559	.464	L3
12	Jacksonville Jaguars	South	7	9	0	.438	3–3	6–6	.496	.411	L4
13	Buffalo Bills	East	6	10	0	.375	2–4	4–8	.516	.469	W1
14 (Note: Cleveland finished ahead of Oakland based on a head-to-head victory.)	Cleveland Browns	North	5	11	0	.313	1–5	5–7	.512	.388	W4
15	Oakland Raiders	West	5	11	0	.313	2–4	4–8	.527	.525	L2
16	Kansas City Chiefs	West	4	12	0	.250	2–4	3–9	.516	.406	W1
**Tiebreakers** (Note: When breaking ties for three or more teams under the NFL's rules, they are first broken within divisions, then comparing only the highest ranked remaining team from each division.)
