= Mark Bradley =

American football player (born 1982)

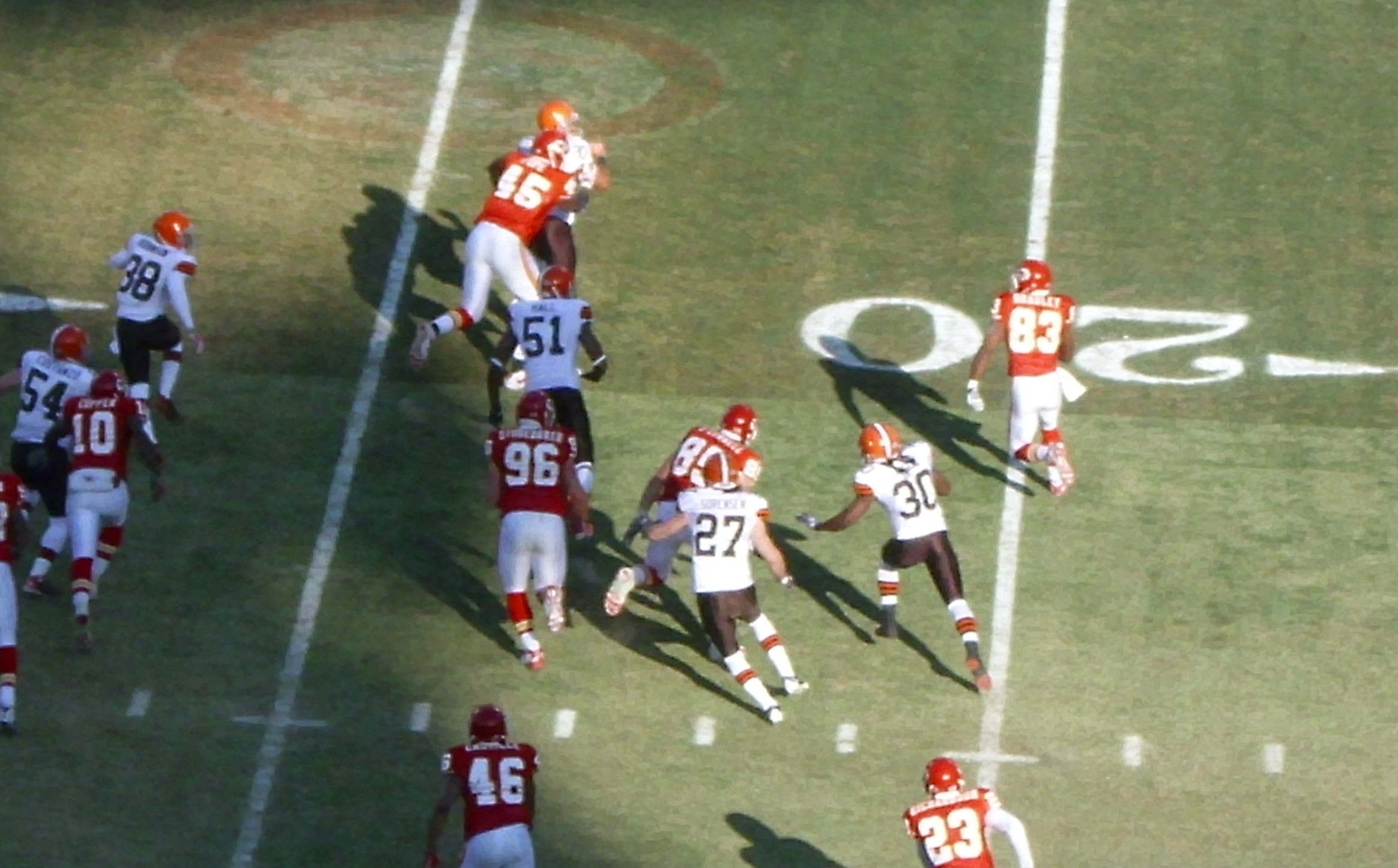
- Bradley (#83) with the Kansas City Chiefs in 2009

No. 16, 83
- Positions: Wide receiver, punt returner

Personal information
- Born: January 29, 1982 (age 44); Pine Bluff, Arkansas, U.S.
- Listed height: 6 ft 1 in (1.85 m)
- Listed weight: 201 lb (91 kg)

Career information
- High school: Pine Bluff
- College: Arkansas–Pine Bluff (2001–2002); Oklahoma (2003–2004)
- NFL draft: 2005: 2nd round, 39th overall pick

Career history
- Chicago Bears (2005–2008); Kansas City Chiefs (2008–2009); Tampa Bay Buccaneers (2009); New Orleans Saints (2010)*
- * Offseason or practice squad member only

Career NFL statistics
- Receptions: 92
- Receiving yards: 1,283
- Receiving touchdowns: 9
- Stats at Pro Football Reference

Mark Anthony Bradley (born January 29, 1982) is an American former professional football player who was a wide receiver and punt returner for five seasons in the National Football League (NFL). He was selected by the Chicago Bears in the second round of the 2005 NFL draft. He played college football for the Oklahoma Sooners.

Bradley was also a member of the Kansas City Chiefs, Tampa Bay Buccaneers, and New Orleans Saints.

== Professional career ==
Pre-draft measurables
| Height | Weight | 40-yard dash | 10-yard split | 20-yard split | 20-yard shuttle | Three-cone drill | Vertical jump | Broad jump |
|---|---|---|---|---|---|---|---|---|
| 6 ft 1 3/8 in (1.86 m) | 201 lb (91 kg) | 4.32 s | 1.60 s | 2.64 s | 3.98 s | 6.96 s | 39 1/2 in (1.00 m) | 10 ft 8 in (3.25 m) |
All values from NFL Combine.

=== Chicago Bears ===
Due to a season-ending injury against the Detroit Lions, Bradley was a small part of the Bears 2005 offense, starting only eight games, and recording just 18 receptions for 230 yards.

Following an injury to Bernard Berrian during week nine of the 2006 season, Bradley became a productive asset for the Bears’ offense. While filling in for Berrian in the following weeks, Bradley caught two touchdown passes for 202 yards. He scored a 75-yard touchdown during the season finale in a 26–7 loss to the Green Bay Packers.

Bradley was released by the Bears on September 23, 2008, after the team signed cornerback Marcus Hamilton.

=== Kansas City Chiefs ===
Bradley was signed by the Kansas City Chiefs on October 1, 2008. He threw the first touchdown pass of his career to quarterback Tyler Thigpen, on a wide-receiver reverse trick play, against the Tampa Bay Buccaneers.

Bradley was released by the team on December 22, 2009, after the team re-signed wide receiver Quinten Lawrence.

=== Tampa Bay Buccaneers ===
Bradley was claimed off waivers by the Tampa Bay Buccaneers on December 23, 2009.

Bradley was released by the Buccaneers on June 16, 2010, to make room for sixth-round draft pick Brent Bowden. He failed to appear in a single game for the Buccaneers.

=== New Orleans Saints ===
Bradley signed with the New Orleans Saints on August 6, 2010. The Saints released Bradley on August 24.

== Personal life ==
Bradley's father, Danny Bradley, played for the Los Angeles Rams and Detroit Lions. His mother Deborah Perry raised him in Pine Bluff, Arkansas.
