= Jon McGraw =

American football player (born 1979)

No. 38, 40, 47
- Position: Safety

Personal information
- Born: April 2, 1979 (age 47); Manhattan, Kansas, U.S.
- Listed height: 6 ft 3 in (1.91 m)
- Listed weight: 208 lb (94 kg)

Career information
- High school: Riley County (Riley, Kansas)
- College: Kansas State
- NFL draft: 2002: 2nd round, 57th overall pick

Career history
- New York Jets (2002–2004); Detroit Lions (2005–2006); Kansas City Chiefs (2007–2011)

Career NFL statistics
- Total tackles: 365
- Sacks: 2
- Forced fumbles: 4
- Fumble recoveries: 4
- Pass deflections: 24
- Interceptions: 10
- Defensive touchdowns: 1
- Stats at Pro Football Reference

Jon Michael McGraw (born April 2, 1979) is an American former professional football player who was a safety in the National Football League (NFL). He played college football for the Kansas State Wildcats and was selected by the New York Jets with a second-round pick in the 2002 NFL draft. He also played with the Kansas City Chiefs and Detroit Lions.

== College career ==
McGraw played collegiately as a walk-on under head coach Bill Snyder at Kansas State University from 1997 to 2001. He was a non-scholarship redshirt his freshman year of 1997. McGraw became a starter in 2000 after getting action as a back-up in 1999. In 2000 as a junior, he was a Big 12 Honorable Mention by the AP and coaches. He led the Wildcats to a Cotton Bowl victory over the Tennessee Volunteers. 2001 would be McGraw's final season, a season that Wildcats struggled to a 6–5 record, after a loss to the Syracuse Orangemen in the 2001 Insight.com Bowl.

Longtime Green Bay Packers wide receiver Jordy Nelson credited McGraw with inspiring him to intentionally pursue a career in the NFL, as they attended the same high school (Riley County), with McGraw a few years ahead of Nelson and they both succeeded as walk-ons at Kansas State.

== Professional career ==
Pre-draft measurables
Height	Weight	Arm length	Hand span	40-yard dash	10-yard split	20-yard split	Three-cone drill	Vertical jump	Broad jump	Bench press
6 ft 2 in (1.88 m)	208 lb (94 kg)	31.5 in (0.80 m)	9 in (0.23 m)	4.48 s	1.59 s	2.57 s	6.51 s	39 1/2 in (1.00 m)	10 ft 4 in (3.15 m)	13 reps
All values from NFL Combine

McGraw was selected in the second round, 57th overall by the New York Jets in the 2002 NFL draft. Prior to the start of the 2005 season, McGraw was traded by the Jets to the Detroit Lions for a 7th round draft choice in the 2006 NFL draft.

=== Kansas City Chiefs ===
On March 29, 2007, McGraw signed a two-year contract with the Kansas City Chiefs. On September 13, 2009, McGraw scored his first touchdown after blocking a punt against the Baltimore Ravens. McGraw also had an interception when the ball was tipped in the air and he caught in the endzone for a touchback. This would also lead to a 39-yard Hail Mary touchdown from Tyler Palko to Dexter McCluster. In 2011, his final year in the NFL, McGraw was awarded the Chief's Ed Block Courage Award, an award voted by his teammates for role models of inspiration, sportsmanship, and courage.

=== NFL statistics ===
Year	Team	Games	Combined tackles	Tackles	Assisted tackles	Sacks	Forced fumbles	Fumble recoveries	Fumble return yards	Interceptions	Interception return yards	Yards per interception return	Longest interception return	Interceptions returned for touchdown	Passes defended
2002	NYJ	15	39	30	9	0.0	0	0	0	1	0	0	0	0	1
2003	NYJ	6	31	20	11	0.0	0	0	0	0	0	0	0	0	0
2004	NYJ	12	39	31	8	0.0	1	0	0	2	0	0	0	0	6
2005	DET	8	21	16	5	0.0	0	1	0	0	0	0	0	0	0
2006	DET	16	44	34	10	0.0	1	1	0	0	0	0	0	0	2
2007	KC	13	10	9	1	0.0	0	1	0	0	0	0	0	0	1
2008	KC	16	44	35	9	0.0	2	0	0	1	4	4	4	0	1
2009	KC	14	46	42	4	1.0	0	1	0	1	27	27	27	0	1
2010	KC	12	39	30	9	0.0	0	0	0	2	4	2	4	0	6
2011	KC	10	47	31	16	1.0	1	0	0	3	4	1	4	0	6
Career		122	360	278	82	2.0	5	4	0	10	39	4	27	0	24
