= Ricky Price =

American football player (born 1987)

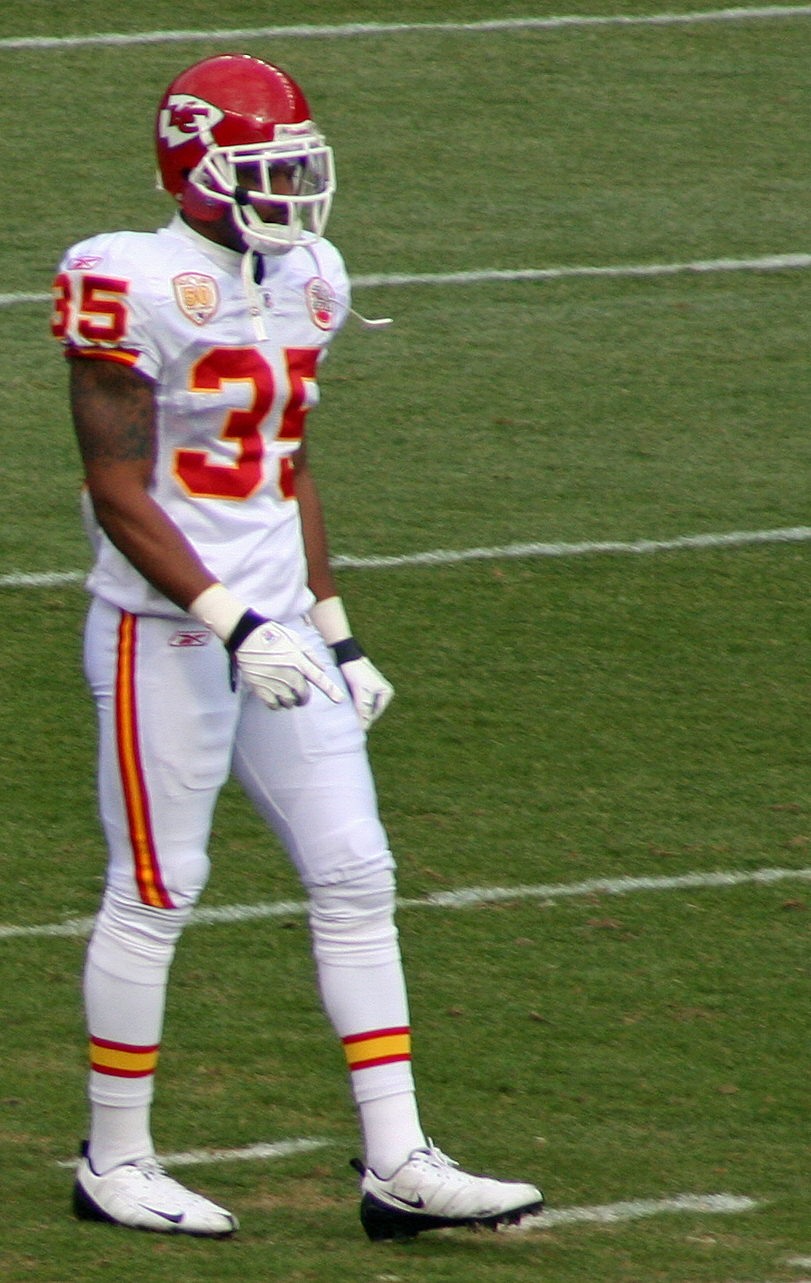
- Price with the Chiefs in January, 2010

No. 35
- Position: Safety

Personal information
- Born: September 16, 1987 (age 39); Houston, Texas, U.S.
- Listed height: 6 ft 1 in (1.85 m)
- Listed weight: 195 lb (88 kg)

Career information
- College: Oklahoma State
- NFL draft: 2009: undrafted

Career history
- Kansas City Chiefs (2009–2010)

Career NFL statistics
- Total tackles: 12
- Stats at Pro Football Reference

Ricky Earl Price (born September 16, 1987) is an American former professional football player who was a safety for the Kansas City Chiefs of the National Football League (NFL). He played college football for the Oklahoma State Cowboys and was signed by the Chiefs as an undrafted free agent in 2009 and played for the Chiefs in the 2009 and 2010 season.

== Early life ==
Price attended Cypress Falls High School in Houston, graduated in 2005.

== College career ==
Price attended Oklahoma State University, where he played wide receiver for his first two seasons, and became a full-time starter at safety his junior and senior years.

== Professional career ==
=== Kansas City Chiefs ===
The Kansas City Chiefs signed Price to their practice squad on October 28, 2009. He was promoted to the active roster on December 26 after safety DaJuan Morgan was placed on injured reserve. Price spent the majority of the 2010 season on the practice squad before being activated in December. Price was waived on September 3, 2014, during the final roster cutdowns.
