= Matt Gutierrez =

American football player (born 1984)

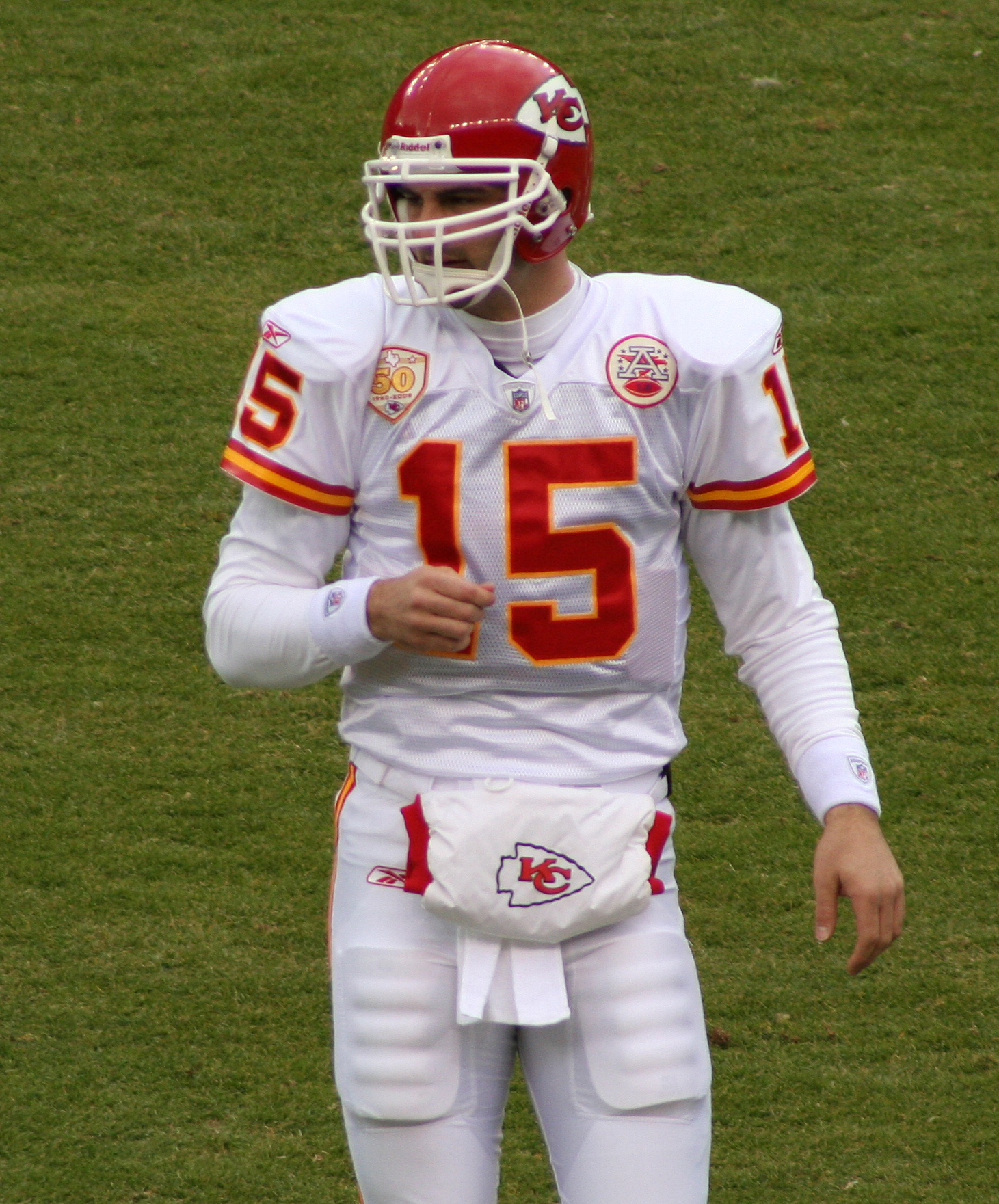
- Gutierrez with the Kansas City Chiefs in 2010

No. 7, 15, 17, 9
- Position: Quarterback

Personal information
- Born: June 9, 1984 (age 42); Concord, California, U.S.
- Listed height: 6 ft 4 in (1.93 m)
- Listed weight: 230 lb (104 kg)

Career information
- High school: De La Salle (Concord)
- College: Michigan (2003–2005); Idaho State (2006)
- NFL draft: 2007: undrafted

Career history
- New England Patriots (2007–2008); Kansas City Chiefs (2009); Chicago Bears (2010)*; Omaha Nighthawks (2010); Chicago Bears (2011)*; Washington Redskins (2011)*; St. Louis Rams (2011)*; Arizona Rattlers (2012)*; Kansas City Command (2012)
- * Offseason or practice squad member only

Career NFL statistics
- TD–INT: 0–0
- Passing yards: 18
- Passer rating: 104.2
- Stats at Pro Football Reference

Career AFL statistics
- Comp. / Att.: 217 / 384
- Passing yards: 2,331
- TD–INT: 35–17
- Passer rating: 78.81
- Rushing touchdowns: 5
- Stats at ArenaFan.com

Matthew Paul Gutierrez (born June 9, 1984) is an American former professional football player who was a quarterback in the National Football League (NFL) and Arena Football League (AFL). He was signed by the New England Patriots as an undrafted free agent in 2007. He played college football for the Idaho State Bengals.

He was also a member of the Kansas City Chiefs, Chicago Bears, Omaha Nighthawks, Washington Redskins, St. Louis Rams, Arizona Rattlers and Kansas City Command.

== Early life ==
Gutierrez played high school football for perennial powerhouse De La Salle High School in Concord, California, where he never lost a game as a Spartan. He was teammates with former NFL running back Maurice Jones-Drew.

== College career ==
Gutierrez went on to play at the University of Michigan, where he was slated to be the starter in 2004 before he suffered a shoulder injury (a torn labrum) before the season opener during pregame warm-ups. Backup quarterback freshman Chad Henne played well during the games Gutierrez was unable to play and was thus awarded the starting job. Gutierrez then transferred to Idaho State University, where he started at quarterback in 2006.

== Professional career ==
Pre-draft measurables
Height	Weight	Arm length	Hand span	40-yard dash	10-yard split	20-yard split	20-yard shuttle	Three-cone drill	Vertical jump	Broad jump
6 ft 4 1/4 in (1.94 m)	232 lb (105 kg)	33 3/4 in (0.86 m)	9 5/8 in (0.24 m)	4.90 s	1.68 s	2.86 s	4.28 s	6.69 s	31.5 in (0.80 m)	9 ft 0 in (2.74 m)
All values from NFL Combine/Pro Day

=== New England Patriots ===
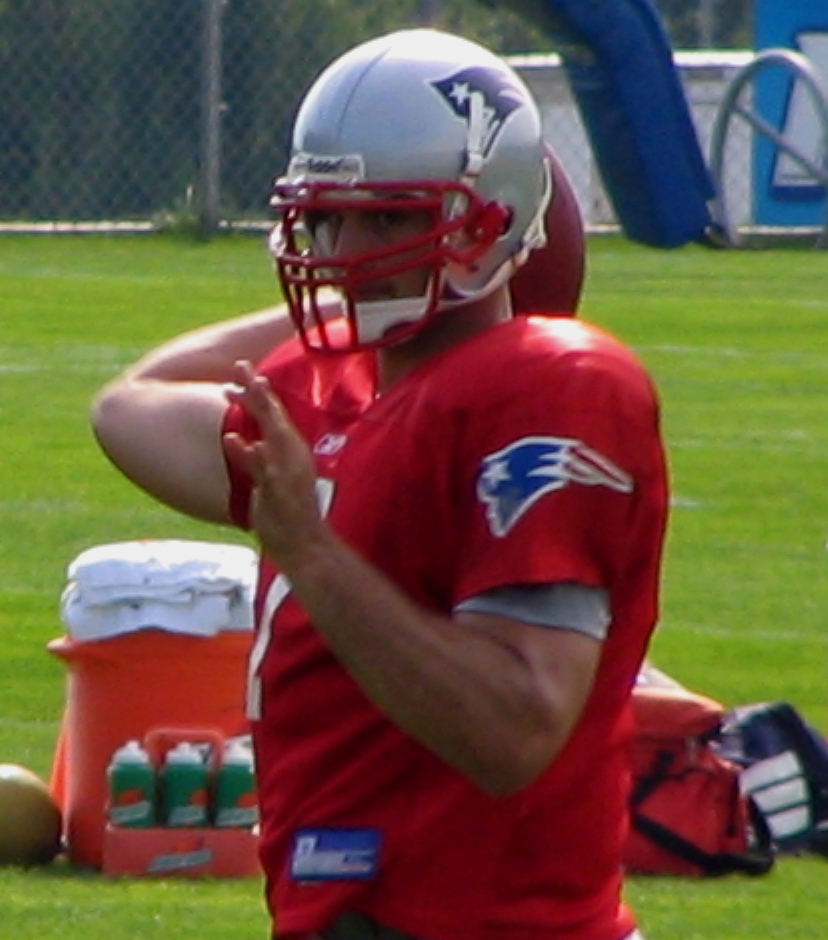
Matt Gutierrez at the Patriots 2007 training camp.

After going undrafted in the 2007 NFL draft, Gutierrez was signed by the New England Patriots on May 8 as an undrafted free agent. Gutierrez played in his first career regular season game on September 9 against the New York Jets and completed his first regular-season pass for a 15-yard gain against the Miami Dolphins on December 23. He appeared in five games with the team as a rookie while being inactive for 11 others.

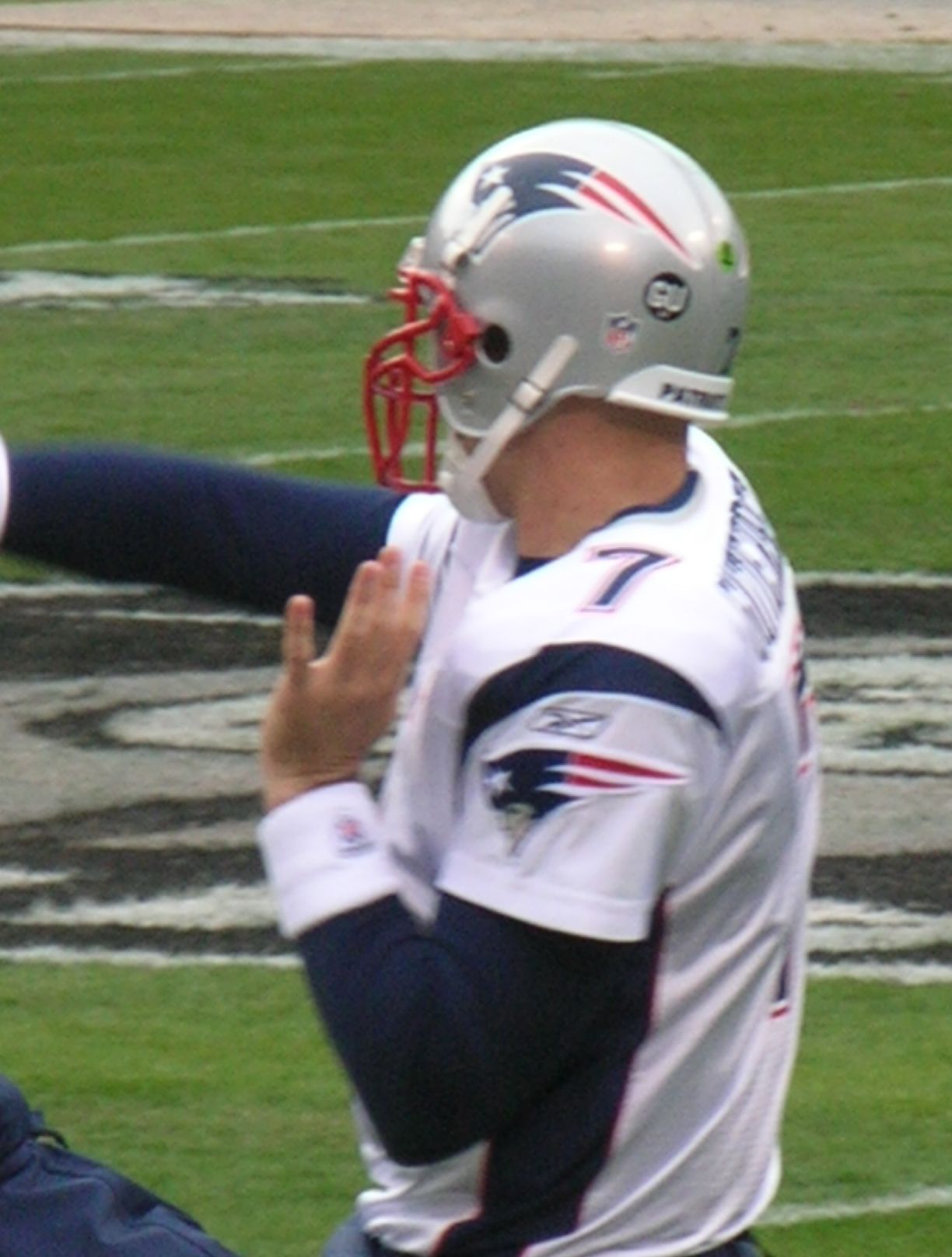
Gutierrez in 2008

During the 2008 preseason, Gutierrez completed 29 out of 45 passes for 362 passing yards and two touchdowns with two interceptions. On August 30, Gutierrez was part of the final cuts as the Patriots cut down to the mandatory 53-man roster. He was re-signed to the team's practice squad on September 10, then promoted to the active roster on September 13 after a season-ending injury to starter Tom Brady. He was inactive for the remaining 14 games of the season.

The Patriots waived Gutierrez on August 3, 2009 after signing quarterback Andrew Walter.

=== Kansas City Chiefs ===
Gutierrez was claimed off waivers by the Kansas City Chiefs on August 5, 2009. The Chiefs waived Gutierrez on June 14, 2010.

=== Chicago Bears (first stint) ===
Gutierrez signed with the Chicago Bears on August 18, 2010. He was released on August 30, 2010. The Bears re-signed Gutierrez in January 2011 to a reserve/future contract.

=== Omaha Nighthawks ===
Gutierrez was signed by the Omaha Nighthawks of the United Football League on September 28, 2010.

=== Chicago Bears (second stint) ===
Gutierrez signed a reserve/future contract with the Chicago Bears in 2011. He was waived on August 8.

=== Washington Redskins ===
On August 10, 2011, Gutierrez was claimed off waivers by the Washington Redskins. On September 3, 2011 the Redskins cut him.

=== Arizona Rattlers ===
On September 27, 2011, Gutierrez signed with the Arizona Rattlers of the Arena Football League.

=== St. Louis Rams ===
On December 6, 2011, Gutierrez was added to the practice squad of the St. Louis Rams. Two days later, on December 9, 2011 Gutierrez was cut from the practice squad.

=== Kansas City Command ===
On March 31, 2012, the Rattlers traded Gutierrez to the Kansas City Command.
