= Javarris Williams =

American football player (born 1986)

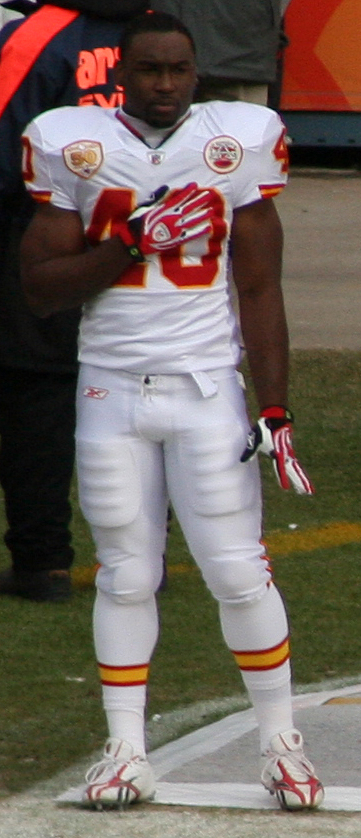
- Williams during his tenure with the Chiefs.

No. 40
- Position: Running back

Personal information
- Born: April 8, 1986 (age 40); Richmond, Texas, U.S.
- Listed height: 5 ft 11 in (1.80 m)
- Listed weight: 220 lb (100 kg)

Career information
- High school: Foster (Richmond)
- College: Tennessee State
- NFL draft: 2009: 7th round, 212th overall pick

Career history
- Kansas City Chiefs (2009); Seattle Seahawks (2010)*; Houston Texans (2011–2012)*; Dallas Cowboys (2012)*; Washington Redskins (2012)*
- * Offseason or practice squad member only

Career NFL statistics
- Rushing attempts: 6
- Rushing yards: 6
- Stats at Pro Football Reference

Javarris Jamiel Williams (born April 8, 1986) is an American former professional football player who was a running back in the National Football League (NFL). He played college football for the Tennessee State Tigers. Williams was selected by the Kansas City Chiefs in the seventh round of the 2009 NFL draft. He was also a member of the Seattle Seahawks, Houston Texans, Dallas Cowboys, and Washington Redskins.

== Early life ==
He played high school football at Foster High School in Richmond Texas.

== Professional career ==
=== Kansas Chiefs ===
Williams spent the 2009 preseason as a member of the Kansas City Chiefs before being released. Williams was promoted to the active roster on December 5, 2009, due to the season-ending knee injury suffered by Kolby Smith.

He was released on September 4, 2010.

=== Seattle Seahawks ===
Williams was signed to the practice squad of the Seattle Seahawks on October 6, 2010. He was released on October 10.

=== Houston Texans ===
On August 12, 2011, Williams signed with the Houston Texans. He was released on September 3. He signed with the team's practice squad on October 19.

Williams was released on June 4, 2012.

=== Dallas Cowboys ===
On August 6, 2012, Williams signed with the Dallas Cowboys. He was released on August 27.

=== Washington Redskins ===
Williams signed with the practice squad of the Washington Redskins on September 11, 2012.
