= Dantrell Savage =

American football player (born 1985)

No. 29
- Position: Running back

Personal information
- Born: February 15, 1985 (age 41); Columbus, Georgia, U.S.
- Listed height: 5 ft 8 in (1.73 m)
- Listed weight: 187 lb (85 kg)

Career information
- High school: Jordan Vocational (Columbus)
- College: Oklahoma State
- NFL draft: 2008: undrafted

Career history
- Kansas City Chiefs (2008–2009); Carolina Panthers (2010)*
- * Offseason or practice squad member only

Awards and highlights
- First-team All-Big 12 (2007); Independence Bowl Offensive MVP (2006)

Career NFL statistics
- Rushing yards: 98
- Rushing average: 3.9
- Rushing touchdowns: 0
- Stats at Pro Football Reference

Dantrell Savage (born February 15, 1985) is an American former professional football player who was a running back for the Kansas City Chiefs of the National Football League (NFL). He played college football for the Oklahoma State Cowboys and was signed by the Kansas City Chiefs as an undrafted free agent in 2008.

== Professional career ==
=== Kansas City Chiefs ===
Savage was signed to a two-year contract by the Kansas City Chiefs as an undrafted free agent following the 2008 NFL draft on May 20, 2008. He was placed on injured reserve due to an ankle injury on December 19, 2009. He was released by the Chiefs on March 3, 2010.

=== Carolina Panthers ===
Savage signed with the Carolina Panthers on August 2, 2010. He was released on September 4, 2013
