= Dion Gales =

American football player (born 1985)

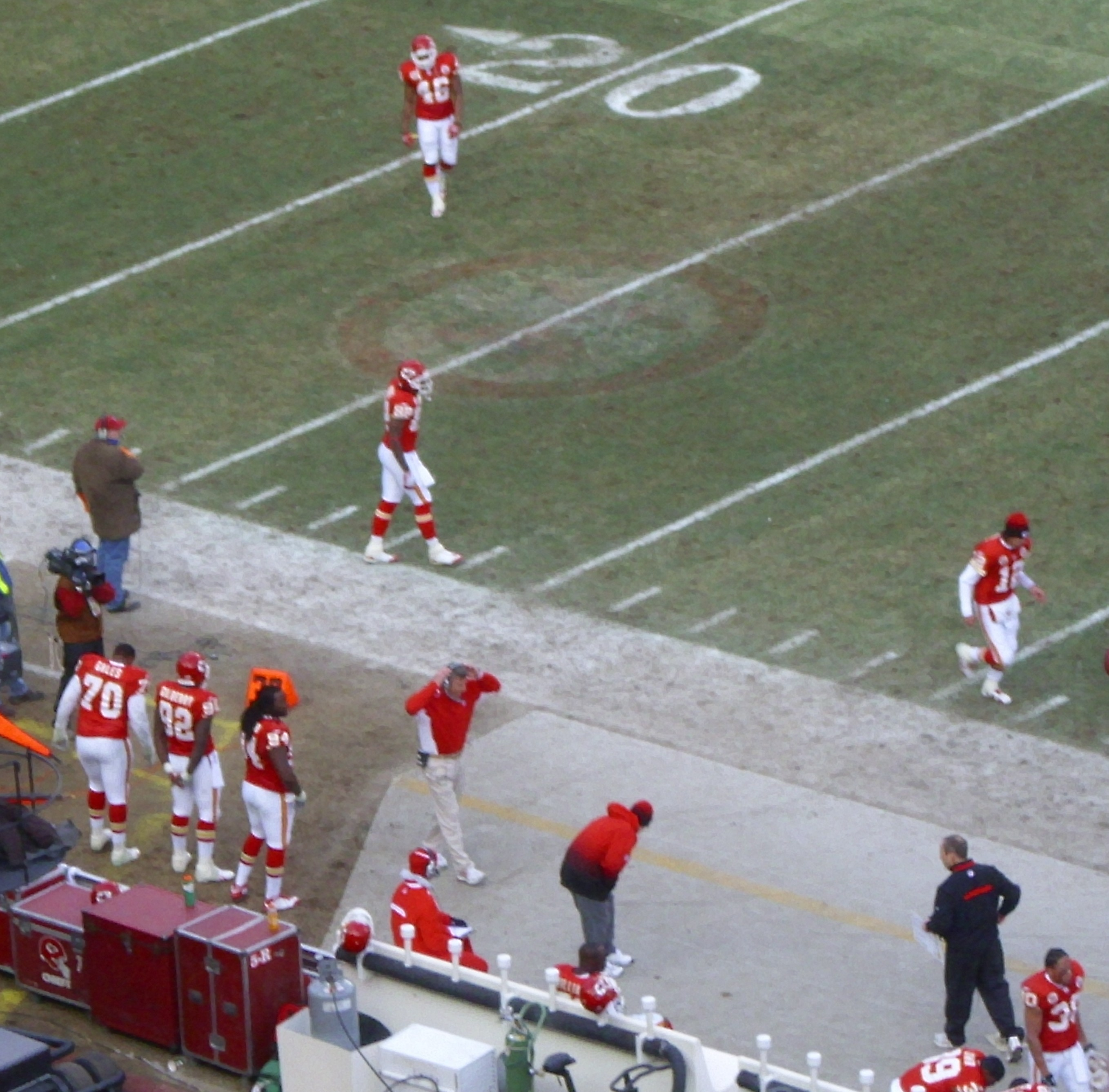
- Gales (#70) on the sidelines during a game

No. 70
- Position: Defensive end

Personal information
- Born: August 17, 1985 (age 41); New Orleans, Louisiana
- Listed height: 6 ft 5 in (1.96 m)
- Listed weight: 259 lb (117 kg)

Career information
- College: Troy
- NFL draft: 2009: undrafted

Career history
- Kansas City Chiefs (2009–2011)

Awards and highlights
- Second-team All-Sun Belt (2008)
- Stats at Pro Football Reference

Dion David Gales (born August 17, 1985) is an American former football defensive end for the Kansas City Chiefs of the National Football League.

== Early life ==
Gales was born in New Orleans and played football at John F. Kennedy High School. During high school, he received interest from Miami, LSU, Michigan State, and Ole Miss. Gales signed a letter of intent with the University of Mississippi but did not meet NCAA eligibility requirements and returned to Louisiana. He later played for Gulf Coast State College before joining the Troy Trojans.

== Career ==
Gales joined the Chiefs' practice squad in September 2010 and was promoted to the active roster on December 12, 2009. He was cut by the Chiefs on September 3, 2011.
