= Woodie Dixon =

American lawyer

Woodie H. Dixon Jr. is the General Counsel and Corporate Secretary of Chegg, Inc. (NYSE: CHGG) as of 2020. Dixon oversees all legal, governance, government affairs and stock administration matters for Chegg. Previously, Dixon served as the General Counsel and Senior Vice President of Business Affairs for the Pac-12 Conference from 2010 to 2020. He was formerly the salary cap manager and General Counsel for the Kansas City Chiefs. He had been with the team since August 2004; previously, he worked in the National Football League offices and for the law firms Sidley, Austin, Brown & Wood LLP (in Chicago) and Dorsey & Whitney (in Minneapolis, Minnesota). Dixon is a native of Minneapolis. He graduated from Amherst College in 1995 and went on to earn his J.D. from Harvard Law School in 1999 and his Masters of Sport Management from the University of Massachusetts Amherst in 2004. Dixon has also been an adjunct professor at the Washburn University School of Law in Topeka, Kansas, teaching sports law. Dixon is married to Nicole Miller and they have two children.

Dixon was named one of the Sports Business Journal's Forty under 40 award recipients in 2013.
