= Derek Lokey =

American football player (born 1985)

No. 69
- Position: Defensive tackle

Personal information
- Born: November 25, 1985 (age 40); Nacogdoches, Texas, U.S.
- Listed height: 6 ft 1 in (1.85 m)
- Listed weight: 287 lb (130 kg)

Career information
- High school: Billy Ryan (Denton, Texas)
- College: Texas (2004–2007)
- NFL draft: 2008: undrafted

Career history
- Kansas City Chiefs (2008–2009)
- Stats at Pro Football Reference

Derek Ray Lokey (born November 25, 1985) is an American former professional football player who was a defensive tackle for the Kansas City Chiefs of the National Football League (NFL). He played college football for the Texas Longhorns and was signed by the Chiefs as an undrafted free agent in 2008.

Voted team captain, Lokey won a national champion with Texas in 2005, during which time he also earned Academic All-American honors.
