= Denny Thum =

Personal information
- Born: 1952 (age 73–74); St. Louis, Missouri, U.S.

Career information
- College: Rockhurst

Career history
- Kansas City Chiefs (2006–2009) Executive vice president & chief operating officer; Kansas City Chiefs (2009–2010) President

Denny Thum (pronounced THOOM) is a former team executive for the Kansas City Chiefs of the National Football League (NFL). He served in various positions with the team from 1974 to 2010. From 2009 to 2010, he served as team president.

On May 8, 2009, Thum was promoted to the role of President of the team by chairman Clark Hunt. Thum oversees every aspect of the team's business operations, and reports directly to Hunt. Before he was President, Thum was the Chiefs' Executive Vice President and COO from 2006 until 2010. Thum stepped down from his position on September 14, 2010.

He started with the Chiefs as a staff accountant in 1974. He graduated from Rockhurst College that same year.
