= Jackie Bates =

American football player (born 1986)

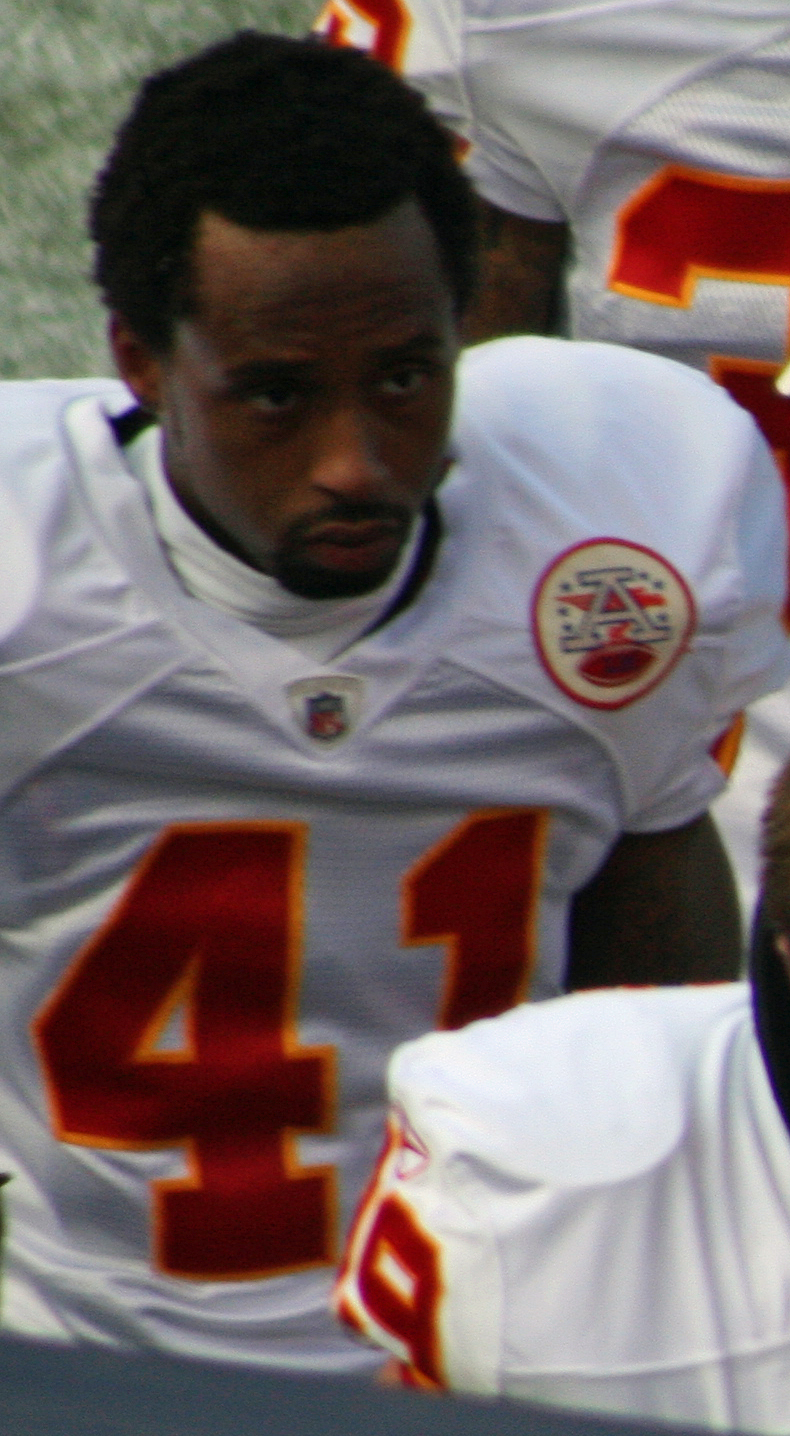
- Bates with the Kansas City Chiefs in 2010

No. 41, 13
- Position: Cornerback

Personal information
- Born: October 12, 1986 (age 40); Sacramento, California, U.S.
- Listed height: 5 ft 10 in (1.78 m)
- Listed weight: 180 lb (82 kg)

Career information
- High school: De La Salle (Concord, California)
- College: Hampton
- NFL draft: 2009: undrafted

Career history
- Kansas City Chiefs (2009–2010); San Jose SaberCats (2012)

Career NFL statistics
- Tackles: 1
- Pass deflections: 1
- Stats at Pro Football Reference

Career AFL statistics
- Tackles: 1.5
- Interceptions: 1
- Stats at ArenaFan.com

Jackie Leonard Bates (born October 12, 1986) is an American former professional football player who was a cornerback for the Kansas City Chiefs of the National Football League (NFL). He played college football for the Hampton Pirates and was signed by the Chiefs as an undrafted free agent in 2009.
