= Jermail Porter =

American football player and wrestler (born 1986)

Profile
- Position: Offensive tackle

Personal information
- Born: May 24, 1986 (age 40); Akron, Ohio
- Listed height: 6 ft 5 in (1.96 m)
- Listed weight: 310 lb (141 kg)

Career information
- College: Kent State
- NFL draft: 2009: undrafted

Career history
- New England Patriots (2009)*; Kansas City Chiefs (2009–2010)*
- * Offseason or practice squad member only

Awards and highlights
- 2009 Wrestling All-American

Career NFL statistics
- Games played: 0
- Games started: 0

Jermail Porter (born May 24, 1986) is former American football offensive lineman and former wrestler. He was last a member of the Kansas City Chiefs. Porter was not selected in the 2009 NFL draft since he did not play college football. He was signed as a free agent by the New England Patriots on April 27, 2009. He was later released, and in December 2009 signed with the Kansas City Chiefs. Porter was waived in June 2010.

Porter was Kent State's first All-American wrestler since 1986. Just like Stephen Neal, Porter did not play organized football in any rank, especially college. Similar to Antonio Gates, Porter was a scholarship athlete in another sport for the Kent State Golden Flashes and did not play football.
