= Darryl Harris (guard) =

American football player (born 1985)

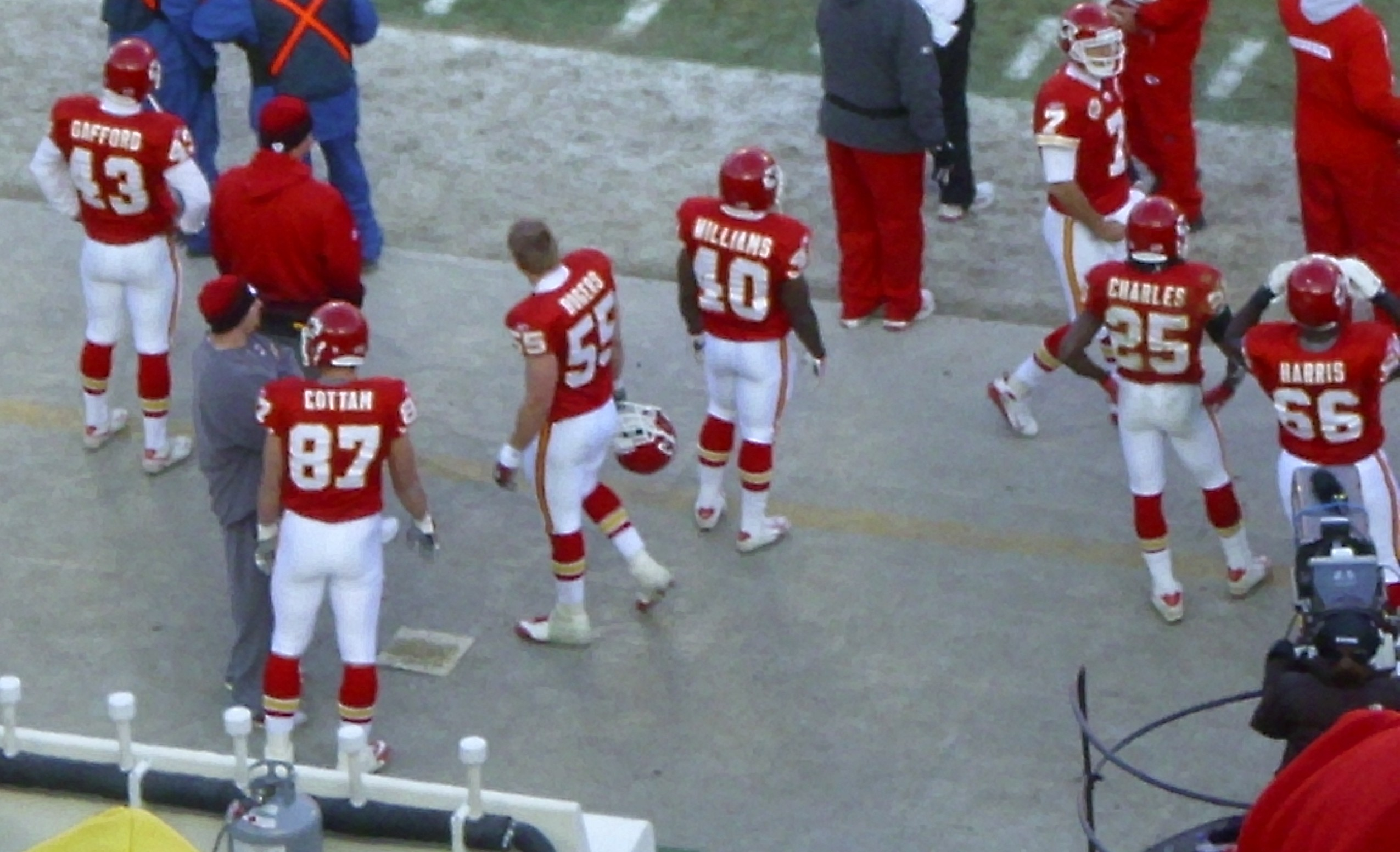
- Harris (#66- far right) on the sidelines

No. 66
- Position: Guard

Personal information
- Born: January 14, 1985 (age 41); Clarksdale, Mississippi
- Listed height: 6 ft 4 in (1.93 m)
- Listed weight: 300 lb (136 kg)

Career information
- High school: Clarksdale High School
- College: Mississippi
- NFL draft: 2009: undrafted

Career history
- Kansas City Chiefs (2009–2011)
- Stats at Pro Football Reference

Darryl Deyung Harris (born January 14, 1985) is an American former football guard. He was waived during final cuts of the 2011 preseason, and after clearing waivers, he was signed to the Chiefs practice squad on September 4, 2011.
