= DaJuan Morgan =

American football player (born 1985)

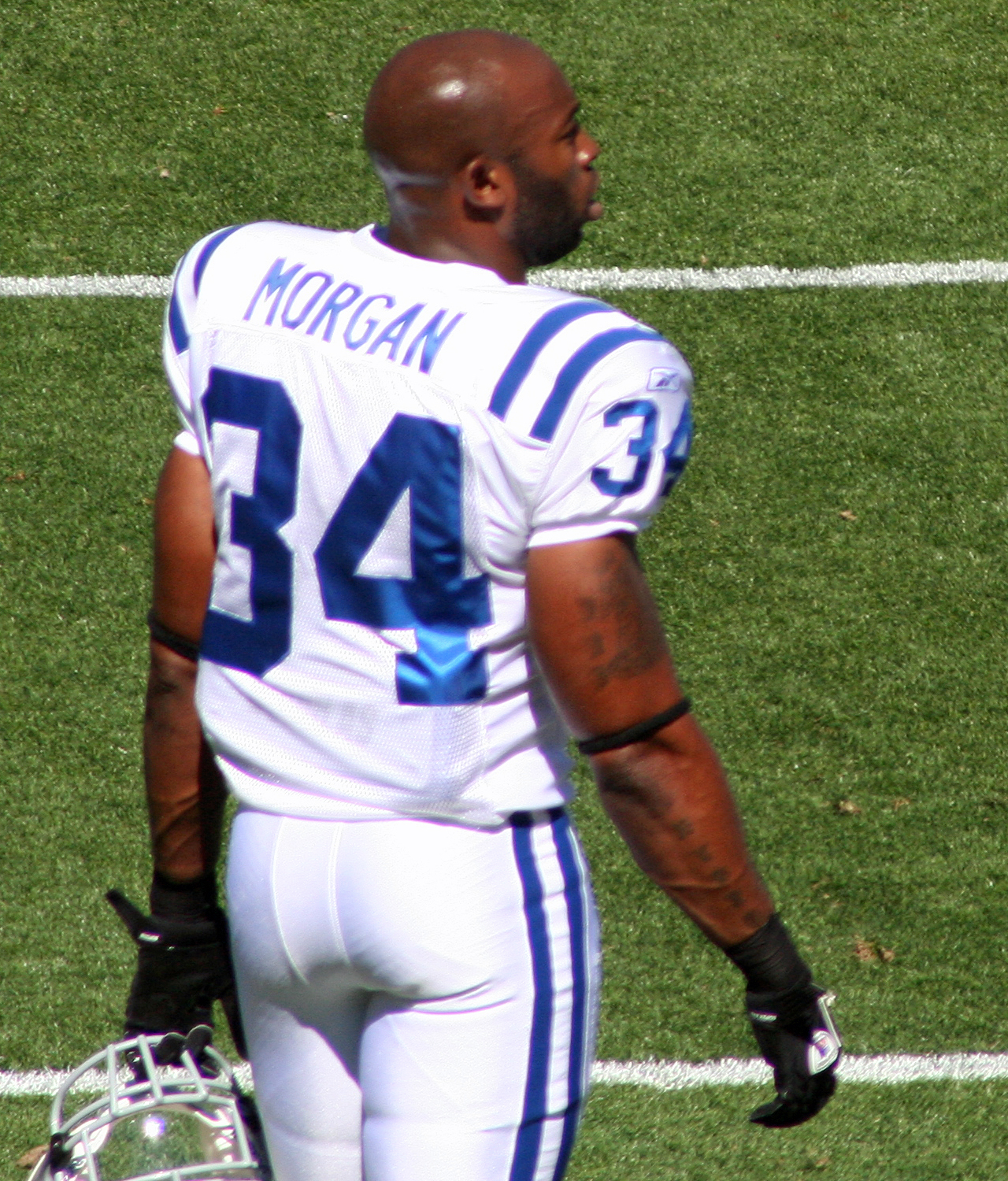
- Morgan with the Indianapolis Colts in 2010

No. 30, 38, 34
- Position: Safety

Personal information
- Born: October 21, 1985 (age 41); West Palm Beach, Florida, U.S.
- Listed height: 6 ft 0 in (1.83 m)
- Listed weight: 203 lb (92 kg)

Career information
- High school: Suncoast (Riviera Beach, Florida)
- College: North Carolina State
- NFL draft: 2008: 3rd round, 82nd overall pick

Career history
- Kansas City Chiefs (2008–2009); Indianapolis Colts (2010); New York Jets (2011)*
- * Offseason or practice squad member only

Awards and highlights
- Second-team All-ACC (2007)

Career NFL statistics
- Total tackles: 42
- Fumble recoveries: 1
- Stats at Pro Football Reference

DaJuan Jamar Morgan (born October 21, 1985) is an American former professional football player who was a safety in the National Football League (NFL). He was selected by the Kansas City Chiefs in the third round of the 2008 NFL draft with the 82nd overall pick. He played in the National Football League for the Kansas City Chiefs from 2008 to 2009 and in two games for the Indianapolis Colts in 2010. He was signed by the New York Jets on August 2, 2011, but they waived him nine days later. He played college football for the NC State Wolfpack.
