= Quinten Lawrence =

American football player (born 1984)

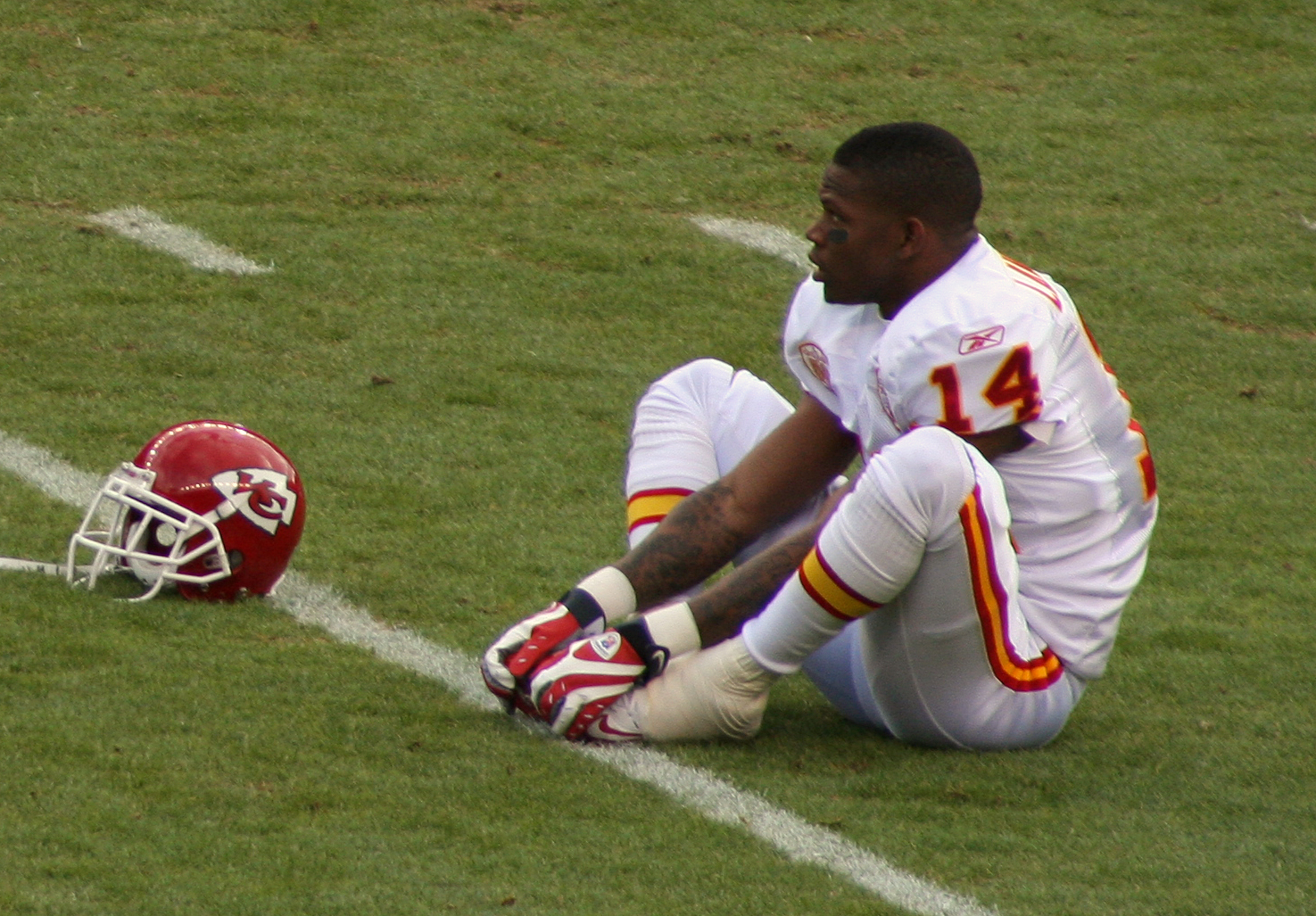
- Lawrence with the Kansas City Chiefs in 2010

No. 14
- Position: Wide receiver

Personal information
- Born: September 24, 1984 (age 42); Carencro, Louisiana, U.S.
- Listed height: 6 ft 0 in (1.83 m)
- Listed weight: 184 lb (83 kg)

Career information
- High school: Carencro (Lafayette, Louisiana)
- College: McNeese State
- NFL draft: 2009: 6th round, 175th overall pick

Career history
- Kansas City Chiefs (2009–2011); Miami Dolphins (2012)*; Toronto Argonauts (2013)*
- * Offseason or practice squad member only

Awards and highlights
- First-team All-SLC (2005); Second-team All-SLC (2007)

Career NFL statistics
- Total tackles: 3
- Stats at Pro Football Reference

Quinten Louis Lawrence (born September 21, 1984) is an American former professional football player who was a wide receiver in the National Football League (NFL). He was selected by the Kansas City Chiefs in the sixth round of the 2009 NFL draft. He played college football for the McNeese State Cowboys.

== Early life ==
Lawrence attended Carencro High School in Carencro, Louisiana and was a student and a letterman in football, basketball, and track & field. In football, as a senior, he had 698 receiving yards and thirteen receiving touchdowns, and after the season, he was named as an All-District, All-Parish, and All-Acadiana selection. In basketball, he was an All-Parish selection. In track & field, he was a high jump state champion. Quinten Lawrence graduated from Carencro High School in 2004. His parents are Wiltion and Laynnette Lawrence.

== Professional career ==
Lawrence was signed by the Toronto Argonauts on June 6, 2013. He was released on June 23, 2013.
