= 2011 Kansas City Chiefs season =

NFL team season

- Owner: The Hunt family (Clark Hunt Chairman and CEO)
- General manager: Scott Pioli
- Head coach: Todd Haley (fired Dec. 12, 5–8 record); Romeo Crennel (interim, 2–1 record)
- Offensive coordinator: Bill Muir
- Defensive coordinator: Romeo Crennel
- Home stadium: Arrowhead Stadium

Results
- Record: 7–9
- Division place: 4th AFC West
- Playoffs: Did not qualify
- All-Pros: 2: LB Tamba Hali (2nd team); LB Derrick Johnson (1st team)
- Pro Bowlers: 2: LB Tamba Hali; LB Derrick Johnson
- Team MVP: Derrick Johnson
- Team ROY: Justin Houston

Uniform
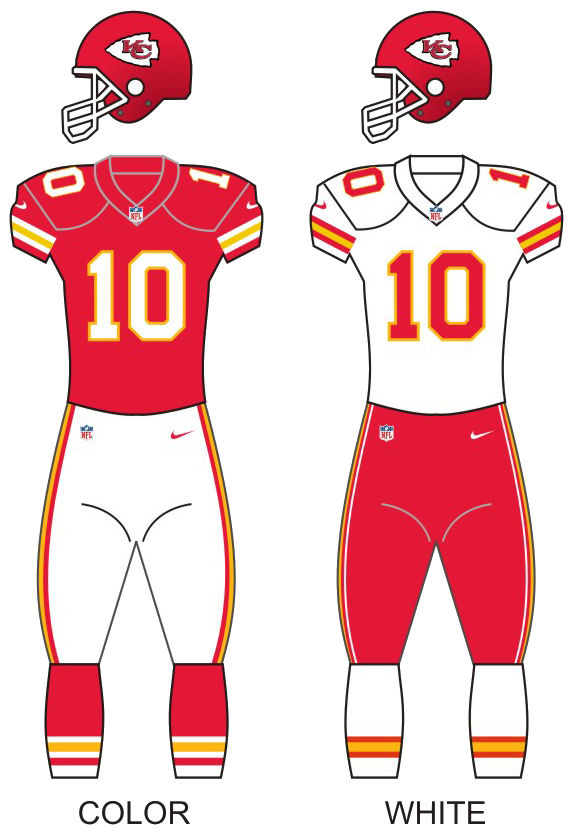

The 2011 season was the Kansas City Chiefs' 42nd in the National Football League (NFL), their 52nd overall and their third under the head coach/general manager tandem of Todd Haley and Scott Pioli. A 10–6 record in their 2010 season lent high expectations to their 2011 season, but the Chiefs suffered reversed fortunes. A season-ending hand injury to their starting quarterback Matt Cassel in their eighth game of the season proved especially significant. After a 4–4 record with Cassel at the helm, the Chiefs staggered to a 7–9 win–loss record by season end and failed to make the playoffs.

The Chiefs training camp began on July 29 in St. Joseph, Missouri. The Chiefs played their first preseason game on August 12 against the Tampa Bay Buccaneers. On September 11, the Chiefs opened their regular season against the Buffalo Bills. They did not earn their first win until Week 4 against the Minnesota Vikings. After starting the season 5–8, head coach Todd Haley was fired after a 37–10 loss to the New York Jets. Haley was replaced by defensive coordinator Romeo Crennel on an interim basis for the remainder of the season. Haley became the second Chiefs coach to be fired during a season; the first was Paul Wiggin in 1977.

One spot of the season is the first game after Crennel took over as interim head coach. The Chiefs achieved an upset win against the 13–0 defending Super Bowl champion Green Bay Packers to ruin their perfect season hopes; that loss would prove to be the only one the 2011 Packers suffered in their 15–1 regular season record.

== Offseason ==
=== Coaching changes ===
Kansas City Chiefs Coaching Changes
| Position | Coach | 2010 position | 2011 position |
|---|---|---|---|
| OC | Bill Muir | Kansas City Chiefs OLC | Kansas City Chiefs OC/OLC |
| OC | Charlie Weis | Kansas City Chiefs OC | Florida Gators OC |
| QBC | Jim Zorn | Baltimore Ravens QBC | Kansas City Chiefs QBC |

=== Free agency ===
Kansas City Chiefs free agency
| Position | Player | Status* | 2010 team | 2011 team |
|---|---|---|---|---|
| LB | Charlie Anderson | UFA | Kansas City Chiefs | None |
| RB | Jackie Battle | RFA | Kansas City Chiefs | Kansas City Chiefs |
| WR | Steve Breaston | UFA | Arizona Cardinals | Kansas City Chiefs |
| CB | Brandon Carr | RFA | Kansas City Chiefs | Kansas City Chiefs |
| FB | Tim Castille | UFA | Kansas City Chiefs | None |
| WR | Keary Colbert | UFA | None | Kansas City Chiefs |
| WR | Terrance Copper | UFA | Kansas City Chiefs | Kansas City Chiefs |
| TE | Brad Cottam | RFA | Kansas City Chiefs | None |
| FB | Mike Cox | RFA | Kansas City Chiefs | Kansas City Chiefs |
| QB | Brodie Croyle | UFA | Kansas City Chiefs | Arizona Cardinals |
| WR | Kevin Curtis | UFA | Kansas City Chiefs | Tennessee Titans |
| CB | Travis Daniels | UFA | Kansas City Chiefs | Kansas City Chiefs |
| DT | Ron Edwards | UFA | Kansas City Chiefs | Carolina Panthers |
| OT | Jared Gaither | UFA | Baltimore Ravens | Kansas City Chiefs |
| DE | Wallace Gilberry | RFA | Kansas City Chiefs | Kansas City Chiefs |
| DT | Kelly Gregg | UFA | Baltimore Ravens | Kansas City Chiefs |
| LB | Cory Greenwood | EFA | Kansas City Chiefs | Kansas City Chiefs |
| LB | Tamba Hali | UFA | Kansas City Chiefs | Kansas City Chiefs |
| S | Reshard Langford | EFA | Kansas City Chiefs | Kansas City Chiefs |
| CB | Maurice Leggett | RFA | Kansas City Chiefs | None |
| FB | Le'Ron McClain | UFA | Baltimore Ravens | Kansas City Chiefs |
| S | Jon McGraw | UFA | Kansas City Chiefs | Kansas City Chiefs |
| OT | Steve Maneri | RFA | New England Patriots | Kansas City Chiefs |
| LB | Corey Mays | UFA | Kansas City Chiefs | None |
| C | Rudy Niswanger | UFA | Kansas City Chiefs | Detroit Lions |
| OT | Ryan O'Callaghan | UFA | Kansas City Chiefs | Kansas City Chiefs |
| S | Sabby Piscitelli | UFA | Tampa Bay Buccaneers & Cleveland Browns | Kansas City Chiefs |
| TE | Leonard Pope | UFA | Kansas City Chiefs | Kansas City Chiefs |
| OT | Barry Richardson | RFA | Kansas City Chiefs | Kansas City Chiefs |
| LB | Brandon Siler | UFA | San Diego Chargers | Kansas City Chiefs |
| DE | Shaun Smith | UFA | Kansas City Chiefs | Tennessee Titans |
| LB | Mike Vrabel | UFA | Kansas City Chiefs | Retired |
| C | Casey Wiegmann | UFA | Kansas City Chiefs | Kansas City Chiefs |
*RFA: Restricted free agent, UFA: Unrestricted free agent, ERFA: Exclusive rights free agent, Franchise: Franchise tag

=== Draft ===
2011 Kansas City Chiefs Draft
| Round | Selection | Player | Position | College |
|---|---|---|---|---|
| 1 ^{[a]} | 26 ^{[b]} | Jon Baldwin | Wide receiver | Pittsburgh |
| 2 | 55 | Rodney Hudson | Center | Florida State |
| 3 | 70 ^{[a]} | Justin Houston | Linebacker | Georgia |
| 3 | 86 | Allen Bailey | Defensive end | Miami (FL) |
| 4 | 118 | Jalil Brown | Cornerback | Colorado |
| 5 | 135 ^{[c]} | Ricky Stanzi | Quarterback | Iowa |
| 5 | 140 ^{[d]} | Gabe Miller | Linebacker | Oregon State |
| 6 ^{[c]} | 199 ^{[e]} | Jerrell Powe | Nose tackle | Mississippi |
| 7 | 223 | Shane Bannon | Fullback | Yale |

^{^[a]} The Chiefs traded their original first-round selection (#21) to the Cleveland Browns in exchange for the first-round selection (#27) which the Browns had previously acquired from Atlanta, and Cleveland's third-round selection (#70 overall).
^{^[b]} The Baltimore Ravens originally held the 26th pick, but they did not submit their pick in the allotted ten minutes which allowed Kansas City to pick ahead of them.
^{^[c]} The Chiefs traded their original sixth-round selection (#187 overall) and DT Alex Magee to the Tampa Bay Buccaneers in exchange for the fifth-round selection which the Buccaneers had previously acquired from Denver.
^{^[d]} The Chiefs swapped fifth-round selections with the Detroit Lions (the Chiefs originally held the #154 overall selection), after the Lions were found guilty of tampering with Chiefs' players.
^{^[e]} Compensatory selection.

=== Undrafted free agents ===
2011 undrafted free agents of note
| Player | Position | College |
|---|---|---|
| Harold Ayodele | Defensive Lineman | Emporia State |
| Brandon Bair | Defensive Lineman | Oregon |
| Charlie Gantt | Tight end | Michigan State |
| Chris Harr | Offensive Lineman | Chattanooga |
| Mike Ingersoll | Offensive Lineman | North Carolina |
| Amara Kamara | Linebacker | Temple |
| Butch Lewis | Offensive Lineman | USC |
| Javes Lewis | Defensive back | Oregon |

== Staff ==
2011 Kansas City Chiefs staff
| Front office: Chairman/CEO – Clark Hunt; President – Mark Donovan; General manager – Scott Pioli; Assistant general manager – Joel Collier; Director of pro personnel – Ray Farmer; Director of college scouting – Phil Emery; Director of football administration – Trip MacCracken; Head coaches: Head coach – Todd Haley (fired Dec 12, 2011); Interim head coach – Romeo Crennel; Assistant head coach – Maurice Carthon; Offensive coaches: Offensive coordinator/offensive line – Bill Muir; Quarterbacks – Jim Zorn; Wide receivers – Richie Anderson; Tight ends – Bernie Parmalee; Assistant offensive line – Pat Perles; Offensive quality control – Nick Sirianni | Defensive coaches: Defensive coordinator – Romeo Crennel; Defensive line – Anthony Pleasant; Linebackers – Gary Gibbs; Defensive backs – Emmitt Thomas; Defensive assistant/assistant linebackers – Adam Zimmer; Defensive quality control – Otis Smith; Pass rush – Joe Kim; Special teams coaches: Special teams – Steve Hoffman; Strength and conditioning: Strength and conditioning – Mike Clark; Assistant strength and conditioning – Brent Salazar |

== Final roster ==
2011 Kansas City Chiefs roster
| Quarterbacks (QB): 8 Kyle Orton; 4 Tyler Palko; 13 Ricky Stanzi; Running backs (RB): 32 Shaun Draughn; 20 Thomas Jones; 44 Le'Ron McClain FB; 22 Dexter McCluster; Wide receivers (WR): 89 Jon Baldwin; 82 Dwayne Bowe; 15 Steve Breaston; 10 Terrance Copper; 11 Jeremy Horne; 83 Jerheme Urban; Tight ends (TE): 88 Anthony Becht; 85 Jake O'Connell; 45 Leonard Pope | Offensive linemen (OL): 76 Branden Albert T; 73 Jon Asamoah G; 61 Rodney Hudson C; 65 Ryan Lilja G; 68 Steve Maneri T; 70 David Mims T; 67 Barry Richardson T; 62 Casey Wiegmann C; Defensive linemen (DL): 97 Allen Bailey DE; 90 Brandon Bair DE; 72 Glenn Dorsey DE; 92 Wallace Gilberry DE; 99 Amon Gordon NT; 77 Kelly Gregg NT; 94 Tyson Jackson DE; 95 Jerrell Powe NT | Linebackers (LB): 59 Jovan Belcher ILB; 93 Cory Greenwood ILB; 91 Tamba Hali OLB; 50 Justin Houston OLB; 56 Derrick Johnson ILB; 55 Cameron Sheffield OLB; 96 Andy Studebaker OLB; 53 Demorrio Williams ILB; Defensive backs (DB): 21 Javier Arenas CB; 30 Jalil Brown CB; 39 Brandon Carr CB; 34 Travis Daniels CB; 24 Brandon Flowers CB; 48 Reshard Langford SS; 23 Kendrick Lewis FS; 47 Jon McGraw SS; 42 Sabby Piscitelli FS; 27 Donald Washington SS; Special teams (ST): 2 Dustin Colquitt P; 43 Thomas Gafford LS; 6 Ryan Succop K | Practice squad: 40 Shane Bannon FB (IR); 60 Rob Bruggeman C; 57 Caleb Campbell LB; 66 Darryl Harris G; 14 Quinten Lawrence WR; 84 Jamar Newsome WR; 74 Luke Patterson DE; 98 Anthony Toribio NT; Reserve: 26 Jackie Battle RB (IR); 29 Eric Berry SS (IR); 7 Matt Cassel QB (IR); 25 Jamaal Charles RB (IR); 51 Gabe Miller OLB (IR); 81 Tony Moeaki TE (IR); 75 Ryan O'Callaghan T (IR); 52 Brandon Siler ILB (IR); Rookies in italics 53 active, 9 reserve, 7 practice squad |

== Preseason ==
=== Schedule ===
| Week | Date | Opponent | Result | Record | Venue | Recap |
|---|---|---|---|---|---|---|
| 1 | August 12 | Tampa Bay Buccaneers | L 0–25 | 0–1 | Arrowhead Stadium | Recap |
| 2 | August 19 | at Baltimore Ravens | L 13–31 | 0–2 | M&T Bank Stadium | Recap |
| 3 | August 26 | St. Louis Rams | L 10–14 | 0–3 | Arrowhead Stadium | Recap |
| 4 | September 1 | at Green Bay Packers | L 19–20 | 0–4 | Lambeau Field | Recap |

=== Game summaries ===
==== Week 1: vs. Tampa Bay Buccaneers ====
Week 1: Tampa Bay Buccaneers at Kansas City Chiefs – Game summary

| Quarter | 1 | 2 | 3 | 4 | Total |
|---|---|---|---|---|---|
| Buccaneers | 10 | 5 | 7 | 3 | 25 |
| Chiefs | 0 | 0 | 0 | 0 | 0 |

at Arrowhead Stadium, Kansas City, Missouri

- Date: August 12
- Game time: 7:00 p.m. CDT
- Game weather: Cloudy, 81 °F (27 °C)
- Game attendance: 67,537
- Referee: Tony Corrente
- Recap, Game Book

Game information

First quarter

- TB – Josh Freeman 5-yard run (Connor Barth kick), 10:26. Buccaneers 7–0. Drive: 2 plays, 9 yards, 0:50.
- TB – Connor Barth 25-yard field goal, 4:35. Buccaneers 10–0. Drive: 8 plays, 42 yards, 4:24.

Second quarter

- TB – Connor Barth 40-yard field goal, 11:18. Buccaneers 13–0. Drive: 12 plays, 52 yards, 6:09.
- TB – Tyler Palko sacked in end zone by Dekoda Watson and Michael Bennett for a Safety, 4:48. Buccaneers 15–0.

Third quarter

- TB – Micheal Spurlock 3-yard pass from Josh Johnson (Connor Barth kick), 6:08. Buccaneers 22–0. Drive: 9 plays, 55 yards, 5:16.

Fourth quarter

- TB – Jacob Rogers 46-yard field goal, 11:44. Buccaneers 25–0. Drive: 6 plays, 22 yards, 2:54.

Top passers

- TB – Josh Johnson – 7/12, 108 yards, TD
- KC – Tyler Palko – 4/8, 34 yards

Top rushers

- TB – Josh Johnson – 5 rushes, 57 yards
- KC – Jackie Battle – 13 rushes, 40 yards

Top receivers

- TB – Dezmon Briscoe – 4 receptions, 60 yards
- KC – Jackie Battle – 3 receptions, 27 yards

==== Week 2: at Baltimore Ravens ====
Week 2: Kansas City Chiefs at Baltimore Ravens – Game summary

| Quarter | 1 | 2 | 3 | 4 | Total |
|---|---|---|---|---|---|
| Chiefs | 3 | 7 | 3 | 0 | 13 |
| Ravens | 3 | 7 | 0 | 21 | 31 |

at M&T Bank Stadium, Baltimore, Maryland

- Date: August 19
- Game time: 7:30 p.m. EDT/6:30 p.m. CDT
- Game weather: Cloudy, 85 °F (29 °C)
- Game attendance: 70,690
- Referee: Gene Steratore
- Recap, Game Book

Game information

First quarter

- KC – Ryan Succop 31-yard field goal, 10:57. Chiefs 3–0. Drive: 4 plays, 2 yards, 0:54.
- BAL – Billy Cundiff 49-yard field goal, 5:55. Tied 3–3. Drive: 12 plays, 55 yards, 5:02.

Second quarter

- BAL – Ray Rice 26-yard run (Billy Cundiff kick), 3:10. Ravens 10–3. Drive: 6 plays, 81 yards, 2:25.
- KC – Terrance Copper 4-yard pass from Tyler Palko (Ryan Succop kick), 0:12. Tied 10–10. Drive: 9 plays, 80 yards, 2:58.

Third quarter

- KC – Ryan Succop 30-yard field goal, 6:58. Chiefs 13–10. Drive: 12 plays, 43 yards, 5:39.

Fourth quarter

- BAL – Jalen Parmele 10-yard run (Billy Cundiff kick), 7:16. Ravens 17–13. Drive: 5 plays, 65 yards, 1:47.
- BAL – Tyrod Taylor 5-yard run (Jake Harfman kick), 1:59. Ravens 24–13. Drive: 6 plays, 73 yards, 3:34.
- BAL – Anthony Allen 1-yard run (Billy Cundiff kick), 0:05. Ravens 31–13. Drive: 4 plays, 41 yards, 1:13.

Top passers

- KC – Tyler Palko – 8/13, 95 yards, TD
- BAL – Joe Flacco – 12/24, 124 yards

Top rushers

- KC – Jackie Battle – 8 rushes, 29 yards
- BAL – Ray Rice – 7 rushes, 44 yards, TD

Top receivers

- KC – Verran Tucker – 3 receptions, 68 yards
- BAL – Lee Evans – 3 receptions, 68 yards

==== Week 3: vs. St. Louis Rams ====
Week 3: St. Louis Rams at Kansas City Chiefs – Game summary

| Quarter | 1 | 2 | 3 | 4 | Total |
|---|---|---|---|---|---|
| Rams | 14 | 0 | 0 | 0 | 14 |
| Chiefs | 0 | 3 | 7 | 0 | 10 |

at Arrowhead Stadium, Kansas City, Missouri

- Date: August 26
- Game time: 7:00 p.m. CDT
- Game weather: Clear, 81 °F (27 °C)
- Game attendance: 67,837
- Referee: Jerome Boger
- Recap, Game Book

Game information

First quarter

- STL – Mike Sims-Walker 6-yard pass from Sam Bradford (Josh Brown kick), 7:08. Rams 7–0. Drive: 12 plays, 73 yards, 7:52.
- STL – Lance Kendricks 11-yard pass from Sam Bradford (Josh Brown kick), 0:48. Rams 14–0. Drive: 10 plays, 60 yards, 4:55.

Second quarter

- KC – Ryan Succop 26-yard field goal, 10:33. Rams 14–3. Drive: 4 plays, –1 yard, 0:56.

Third quarter

- KC – Cody Slate 32-yard pass from Ricky Stanzi (Ryan Succop kick), 0:08. Rams 14–10. Drive: 9 plays, 81 yards, 4:52.

Fourth quarter

- No scoring plays.

Top passers

- STL – Sam Bradford – 9/16, 95 yards, 2 TD, INT
- KC – Ricky Stanzi – 8/14, 121 yards, TD

Top rushers

- STL – Steven Jackson – 15 rushes, 72 yards
- KC – Jackie Battle – 13 rushes, 43 yards

Top receivers

- STL – Lance Kendricks – 2 receptions, 26 yards, TD
- KC – Cody Slate – 2 receptions, 50 yards, TD

==== Week 4: at Green Bay Packers ====
Week 4: Kansas City Chiefs at Green Bay Packers – Game summary

| Quarter | 1 | 2 | 3 | 4 | Total |
|---|---|---|---|---|---|
| Chiefs | 2 | 14 | 0 | 3 | 19 |
| Packers | 7 | 0 | 13 | 0 | 20 |

at Lambeau Field, Green Bay, Wisconsin

- Date: September 1
- Game time: 7:00 p.m. CDT
- Game weather: Mostly clear, 80 °F (27 °C)
- Game attendance: 67,555
- Referee: Mike Carey
- Recap, Game Book

Game information

First quarter

- GB – Tom Crabtree 8-yard pass from Aaron Rodgers (Mason Crosby kick), 7:24. Packers 7–0. Drive: 8 plays, 56 yards, 4:11.
- KC – Matt Flynn tackled in end zone by Allen Bailey for a Safety, 3:20. Packers 7–2.

Second quarter

- KC – Dexter McCluster 10-yard pass from Matt Cassel (Ryan Succop kick), 11:25. Chiefs 9–7. Drive: 11 plays, 75 yards, 6:55.
- KC – Dwayne Bowe 2-yard pass from Tyler Palko (Ryan Succop kick), 0:14. Chiefs 16–7. Drive: 11 plays, 53 yards, 2:25.

Third quarter

- GB – Mason Crosby 43-yard field goal, 7:58. Chiefs 16–10. Drive: 4 plays, 1 yard, 0:57.
- GB – Mason Crosby 32-yard field goal, 5:48. Chiefs 16–13. Drive: 4 plays, 0 yards, 1:59.
- GB – Vic So'oto 33-yard interception return (Mason Crosby kick), 4:20. Packers 20–16.

Fourth quarter

- KC – Ryan Succop 31-yard field goal, 11:29. Packers 20–19. Drive: 4 plays, 3 yards, 2:08.

Top passers

- KC – Tyler Palko – 18/29, 163 yards, TD, 2 INT
- GB – Graham Harrell – 3/5, 21 yards

Top rushers

- KC – Thomas Jones – 12 rushes, 27 yards
- GB – Ryan Grant – 4 rushes, 31 yards

Top receivers

- KC – Dwayne Bowe – 8 receptions, 85 yards, TD
- GB – Tom Crabtree – 2 receptions, 13 yards, TD

== Regular season ==
=== Schedule ===
| Week | Date | Opponent | Result | Record | Venue | Recap |
|---|---|---|---|---|---|---|
| 1 | September 11 | Buffalo Bills | **L** 7–41 | 0–1 | Arrowhead Stadium | Recap |
| 2 | September 18 | at Detroit Lions | **L** 3–48 | 0–2 | Ford Field | Recap |
| 3 | September 25 | at **San Diego Chargers** | **L** 17–20 | 0–3 | Qualcomm Stadium | Recap |
| 4 | October 2 | Minnesota Vikings | **W** 22–17 | 1–3 | Arrowhead Stadium | Recap |
| 5 | October 9 | at Indianapolis Colts | **W** 28–24 | 2–3 | Lucas Oil Stadium | Recap |
| 6 | Bye | | | | | |
| 7 | October 23 | at **Oakland Raiders** | **W** 28–0 | 3–3 | O.co Coliseum | Recap |
| 8 | October 31 | **San Diego Chargers** | **W** 23–20 (OT) | 4–3 | Arrowhead Stadium | Recap |
| 9 | November 6 | Miami Dolphins | **L** 3–31 | 4–4 | Arrowhead Stadium | Recap |
| 10 | November 13 | **Denver Broncos** | **L** 10–17 | 4–5 | Arrowhead Stadium | Recap |
| 11 | November 21 | at New England Patriots | **L** 3–34 | 4–6 | Gillette Stadium | Recap |
| 12 | November 27 | Pittsburgh Steelers | **L** 9–13 | 4–7 | Arrowhead Stadium | Recap |
| 13 | December 4 | at Chicago Bears | **W** 10–3 | 5–7 | Soldier Field | Recap |
| 14 | December 11 | at New York Jets | **L** 10–37 | 5–8 | MetLife Stadium | Recap |
| 15 | December 18 | Green Bay Packers | **W** 19–14 | 6–8 | Arrowhead Stadium | Recap |
| 16 | December 24 | **Oakland Raiders** | **L** 13–16 (OT) | 6–9 | Arrowhead Stadium | Recap |
| 17 | January 1 | at **Denver Broncos** | **W** 7–3 | 7–9 | Sports Authority Field at Mile High | Recap |

Note: Intra-division opponents are in bold text.

=== Game summaries ===
==== Week 1: vs. Buffalo Bills ====
Week 1: Buffalo Bills at Kansas City Chiefs – Game summary

| Quarter | 1 | 2 | 3 | 4 | Total |
|---|---|---|---|---|---|
| **Bills** | 14 | 6 | 14 | 7 | **41** |
| Chiefs | 0 | 7 | 0 | 0 | **7** |

at Arrowhead Stadium, Kansas City, Missouri

- Date: September 11
- Game time: 12:00 p.m. CDT
- Game weather: Sunny, 75 °F (24 °C)
- Game attendance: 68,755
- Referee: Scott Green
- TV announcers (CBS): Marv Albert and Rich Gannon
- Recap, Game Book

Game information

**First quarter**

- BUF – Scott Chandler 4-yard pass from Ryan Fitzpatrick (Rian Lindell kick), 12:14. Bills 7–0. **Drive: 5 plays, 26 yards, 2:39.**
- BUF – Stevie Johnson 27-yard pass from Ryan Fitzpatrick (Rian Lindell kick), 0:55. Bills 14–0. **Drive: 6 plays, 75 yards, 3:37.**

**Second quarter**

- BUF – Rian Lindell 29-yard field goal, 6:42. Bills 17–0. **Drive: 9 plays, 50 yards, 5:04.**
- BUF – Rian Lindell 38-yard field goal, 5:38. Bills 20–0. **Drive: 4 plays, 1 yard, 0:49.**
- KC – Jamaal Charles 6-yard pass from Matt Cassel (Ryan Succop kick), 1:46 Bills 20–7. **Drive: 11 plays, 81 yards, 3:52.**

**Third quarter**

- BUF – Scott Chandler 11-yard pass from Ryan Fitzpatrick (Rian Lindell kick), 4:19. Bills 27–7. **Drive: 8 plays, 59 yards, 5:52.**
- BUF – Donald Jones 4-yard pass from Ryan Fitzpatrick (Rian Lindell kick), 0:14. Bills 34–7. **Drive: 6 plays, 32 yards, 2:50.**

**Fourth quarter**

- BUF – C. J. Spiller 9-yard run (Rian Lindell kick), 11:50. Bills 41–7. **Drive: 4 plays, 28 yards, 2:11.**

**Top passers**

- BUF – Ryan Fitzpatrick – 17/25, 208 yards, 4 TD
- KC – Matt Cassel – 22/36, 119 yards, TD, INT

**Top rushers**

- BUF – Fred Jackson – 20 rushes, 112 yards
- KC – Jamaal Charles – 10 rushes, 56 yards

**Top receivers**

- BUF – Scott Chandler – 5 receptions, 63 yards, 2 TD
- KC – Dexter McCluster – 5 receptions, 25 yards

==== Week 2: at Detroit Lions ====
Week 2: Kansas City Chiefs at Detroit Lions – Game summary

| Quarter | 1 | 2 | 3 | 4 | Total |
|---|---|---|---|---|---|
| Chiefs | 3 | 0 | 0 | 0 | **3** |
| **Lions** | 7 | 13 | 7 | 21 | **48** |

at Ford Field, Detroit, Michigan

- Date: September 18
- Game time: 1:00 p.m. EDT
- Game weather: None (indoor stadium)
- Game attendance: 60,040
- Referee: Tony Corrente
- TV announcers (CBS): Don Criqui and Randy Cross
- Recap, Game Book

Game information

**First quarter**

- DET – Calvin Johnson 15-yard pass from Matthew Stafford (Jason Hanson kick), 10:50. Lions 7–0. **Drive: 2 plays, 56 yards, 0:43.**
- KC – Ryan Succop 33-yard field goal, 8:00. Lions 7–3. **Drive: 7 plays, 65 yards, 2:50.**

**Second quarter**

- DET – Tony Scheffler 36-yard pass from Matt Stafford (Jason Hanson kick), 5:50. Lions 14–3. **Drive: 2 plays, 45 yards, 0:28.**
- DET – Jason Hanson 51-yard field goal, 1:07. Lions 17–3. **Drive: 7 plays, 40 yards, 3:24.**
- DET – Jason Hanson 28-yard field goal, 0:02. Lions 20–3. **Drive: 5 plays, 29 yards, 0:24**

**Third quarter**

- DET – Calvin Johnson 1-yard pass from Matt Stafford (Jason Hanson kick), 1:17. Lions 27–3. **Drive: 10 plays, 84 yards, 4:53.**

**Fourth quarter**

- DET – Jahvid Best 9-yard pass from Matt Stafford (Jason Hanson kick), 14:49. Lions 34–3. **Drive: 5 plays, 23 yards, 1:11.**
- DET – Jahvid Best 1-yard run (Jason Hanson kick), 11:31. Lions 41–3. **Drive: 6 plays, 18 yards, 2:37.**
- DET – Keiland Williams 1-yard run (Jason Hanson kick), 5:06. Lions 48–3. **Drive: 7 plays, 34 yards, 3:40.**

**Top passers**

- KC – Matt Cassel – 15/22, 133 yards, 3 INT
- DET – Matthew Stafford – 23/39, 294 yards, 4 TD, INT

**Top rushers**

- KC – Dexter McCluster – 8 rushes, 51 yards
- DET – Jahvid Best – 16 rushes, 57 yards, TD

**Top receivers**

- KC – Dwayne Bowe – 5 receptions, 101 yards
- DET – Nate Burleson – 7 receptions, 93 yards

==== Week 3: at San Diego Chargers ====
Week 3: Kansas City Chiefs at San Diego Chargers – Game summary

| Quarter | 1 | 2 | 3 | 4 | Total |
|---|---|---|---|---|---|
| Chiefs | 0 | 0 | 7 | 10 | **17** |
| **Chargers** | 0 | 10 | 7 | 3 | **20** |

at Qualcomm Stadium, San Diego, California

- Date: September 25
- Game time: 3:05 p.m. CDT/1:05 p.m. PDT
- Game weather: Partly cloudy, 67 °F (19 °C)
- Game attendance: 62,236
- Referee: Walt Coleman
- TV announcers (CBS): Ian Eagle and Dan Fouts
- Recap, Game Book

Game information

**First quarter**

- No scoring plays.

**Second quarter**

- SD – Ryan Mathews 2-yard run (Nick Novak kick), 12:45. Chargers 7–0. **Drive: 15 plays, 72 yards, 7:07.**
- SD – Nick Novak 35-yard field goal, 0:28. Chargers 10–0. **Drive: 13 plays, 73 yards, 3:09.**

**Third quarter**

- KC – Dwayne Bowe 4-yard pass from Matt Cassel (Ryan Succop kick), 11:21. Chargers 10–7. **Drive: 6 plays, 42 yards, 1:40.**
- SD – Ryan Mathews 4-yard run (Nick Novak kick), 7:32. Chargers 17–7. **Drive: 7 plays, 80 yards, 3:49.**

**Fourth quarter**

- KC – Ryan Succop 33-yard field goal, 12:57. Chargers 17–10. **Drive: 18 plays, 58 yards, 9:35.**
- SD – Nick Novak 41-yard field goal, 8:03. Chargers 20–10. **Drive: 8 plays, 48 yards, 4:54.**
- KC – Leonard Pope 1-yard pass from Matt Cassel (Ryan Succop kick), 4:58. Chargers 20–17. **Drive: 9 plays, 80 yards, 3:05.**

**Top passers**

- KC – Matt Cassel – 17/24, 176 yards, 2 TD, INT
- SD – Philip Rivers – 24/38, 266 yards, 2 INT

**Top rushers**

- KC – Dexter McCluster – 9 rushes, 45 yards
- SD – Ryan Mathews – 21 rushes, 98 yards, 2 TD

**Top receivers**

- KC – Dwayne Bowe – 4 receptions, 67 yards
- SD – Vincent Jackson – 5 receptions, 63 yards

==== Week 4: vs. Minnesota Vikings ====
Week 4: Minnesota Vikings at Kansas City Chiefs – Game summary

| Quarter | 1 | 2 | 3 | 4 | Total |
|---|---|---|---|---|---|
| Vikings | 7 | 0 | 3 | 7 | **17** |
| **Chiefs** | 3 | 6 | 6 | 7 | **22** |

at Arrowhead Stadium, Kansas City, Missouri

- Date: October 2
- Game time: 12:00 p.m. CDT
- Game weather: Sunny, 65 °F (18 °C)
- Game attendance: 72,931
- Referee: Bill Leavy
- TV announcers (Fox): Gus Johnson, Charles Davis and Tim Brewster
- Recap, Game Book

Game information

**First quarter**

- KC – Ryan Succop 40-yard field goal, 7:16. Chiefs 3–0. **Drive: 12 plays, 21 yards, 5:56.**
- MIN – Devin Aromashodu 34-yard pass from Donovan McNabb (Ryan Longwell kick), 1:47. Vikings 7–3. **Drive: 9 plays, 80 yards, 5:29.**

**Second quarter**

- KC – Ryan Succop 24-yard field goal, 5:15. Vikings 7–6. **Drive: 7 plays, 59 yards, 2:32.**
- KC – Ryan Succop 51-yard field goal, 0:00. Chiefs 9–7. **Drive: 12 plays, 47 yards, 2:22.**

**Third quarter**

- MIN – Ryan Longwell 33-yard field goal, 9:15. Vikings 10–9. **Drive: 8 plays, 31 yards, 3:50.**
- KC – Ryan Succop 54-yard field goal, 5:18. Chiefs 12–10. **Drive: 9 plays, 57 yards, 3:57.**
- KC – Ryan Succop 22-yard field goal, 0:09. Chiefs 15–10. **Drive: 7 plays, 41 yards, 3:52.**

**Fourth quarter**

- KC – Dwayne Bowe 52-yard pass from Matt Cassel (Ryan Succop kick), 13:51. Chiefs 22–10. **Drive: 2 plays, 59 yards, 0:46.**
- MIN – Michael Jenkins 1-yard pass from Donovan McNabb (Ryan Longwell kick), 5:50. Chiefs 22–17. **Drive: 13 plays, 70 yards, 8:01.**

**Top passers**

- MIN – Donovan McNabb – 18/30, 202 yards, 2 TD
- KC – Matt Cassel – 18/29, 260 yards, TD

**Top rushers**

- MIN – Adrian Peterson – 23 rushes, 80 yards
- KC – Thomas Jones – 11 rushes, 37 yards

**Top receivers**

- MIN – Visanthe Shiancoe – 6 receptions, 58 yards
- KC – Dwayne Bowe – 5 receptions, 107 yards, TD

==== Week 5: at Indianapolis Colts ====
Week 5: Kansas City Chiefs at Indianapolis Colts – Game summary

| Quarter | 1 | 2 | 3 | 4 | Total |
|---|---|---|---|---|---|
| **Chiefs** | 0 | 14 | 7 | 7 | **28** |
| Colts | 7 | 17 | 0 | 0 | **24** |

at Lucas Oil Stadium, Indianapolis, Indiana

- Date: October 9
- Game time: 1:00 p.m. EDT/12:00 p.m. CDT
- Game weather: Sunny, 72 °F (22 °C) (retractable roof open)
- Game attendance: 65,088
- Referee: Carl Cheffers
- TV announcers (CBS): Kevin Harlan and Solomon Wilcots
- Recap, Game Book

Game information

**First quarter**

- IND – Pierre Garçon 6-yard pass from Curtis Painter (Adam Vinatieri kick), 7:36. Colts 7–0. **Drive: 12 plays, 80 yards, 7:24.**

**Second quarter**

- IND – Adam Vinatieri 53-yard field goal, 12:23. Colts 10–0. **Drive: 8 plays, 45 yards, 2:29.**
- IND – Pierre Garçon 67-yard pass from Curtis Painter (Adam Vinatieri kick), 11:13. Colts 17–0. **Drive: 1 play, 67 yards, 0:10.**
- KC – Dwayne Bowe 41-yard pass from Matt Cassel (Ryan Succop kick), 5:11. Colts 17–7. **Drive: 6 plays, 70 yards, 2:57.**
- IND – Delone Carter 3-yard run (Adam Vinatieri kick), 1:09. Colts 24–7. **Drive: 8 plays, 80 yards, 4:02.**
- KC – Steve Breaston 16-yard pass from Matt Cassel (Ryan Succop kick), 0:13. Colts 24–14. **Drive: 6 plays, 80 yards, 0:56.**

**Third quarter**

- KC – Dwayne Bowe 5-yard pass from Matt Cassel (Ryan Succop kick), 0:40. Colts 24–21. **Drive: 12 plays, 93 yards, 6:07.**

**Fourth quarter**

- KC – Steve Breaston 11-yard pass from Matt Cassel (Ryan Succop kick), 5:15. Chiefs 28–24. **Drive: 9 plays, 54 yards, 4:39.**

**Top passers**

- KC – Matt Cassel – 21/29, 257 yards, 4 TD
- IND – Curtis Painter – 15/27, 277 yards, 2 TD

**Top rushers**

- KC – Jackie Battle – 19 rushes, 119 yards
- IND – Donald Brown – 8 rushes, 38 yards

**Top receivers**

- KC – Dwayne Bowe – 7 receptions, 128 yards, 2 TD
- IND – Pierre Garçon – 5 receptions, 125 yards, 2 TD

==== Week 7: at Oakland Raiders ====
Week 7: Kansas City Chiefs at Oakland Raiders – Game summary

| Quarter | 1 | 2 | 3 | 4 | Total |
|---|---|---|---|---|---|
| **Chiefs** | 14 | 0 | 7 | 7 | **28** |
| Raiders | 0 | 0 | 0 | 0 | **0** |

at O.co Coliseum, Oakland, California

- Date: October 23
- Game time: 3:05 p.m. CDT/1:05 p.m. PDT
- Game weather: Sunny, 79 °F (26 °C)
- Game attendance: 57,361
- Referee: Jeff Triplette
- TV announcers (CBS): Ian Eagle and Dan Fouts
- Recap, Game Book

Game information

**First quarter**

- KC – Kendrick Lewis 59-yard interception return (Ryan Succop kick), 12:35. Chiefs 7–0.
- KC – Le'Ron McClain 1-yard run (Ryan Succop kick), 1:53. Chiefs 14–0. **Drive: 9 plays, 61 yards, 5:04.**

**Second quarter**

- No scoring plays.

**Third quarter**

- KC – Javier Arenas 7-yard run (Ryan Succop kick), 10:25. Chiefs 21–0. **Drive: 8 plays, 64 yards, 4:05.**

**Fourth quarter**

- KC – Brandon Flowers 58-yard interception return (Ryan Succop kick), 10:25. Chiefs 28–0.

**Top passers**

- KC – Matt Cassel – 15/30, 161 yards, 2 INT
- OAK – Carson Palmer – 8/21, 116 yards, 3 INT

**Top rushers**

- KC – Jackie Battle – 16 rushes, 76 yards
- OAK – Michael Bush – 17 rushes, 99 yards

**Top receivers**

- KC – Dwayne Bowe – 6 receptions, 76 yards
- OAK – Darrius Heyward-Bey – 5 receptions, 89 yards

==== Week 8: vs. San Diego Chargers ====
Week 8: San Diego Chargers at Kansas City Chiefs – Game summary

| Quarter | 1 | 2 | 3 | 4 | OT | Total |
|---|---|---|---|---|---|---|
| Chargers | 0 | 3 | 9 | 8 | 0 | **20** |
| **Chiefs** | 10 | 3 | 0 | 7 | 3 | **23** |

at Arrowhead Stadium, Kansas City, Missouri

- Date: October 31
- Game time: 7:30 p.m. CDT
- Game weather: Clear, 63 °F (17 °C)
- Game attendance: 72,733
- Referee: Alberto Riveron
- TV announcers (ESPN): Mike Tirico, Ron Jaworski, Jon Gruden and Rachel Nichols
- Recap, Game Book

Game information

**First quarter**

- KC – Ryan Succop 36-yard field goal, 9:04. Chiefs 3–0. **Drive: 10 plays, 49 yards, 4:46.**
- KC – Jon Baldwin 39-yard pass from Matt Cassel (Ryan Succop kick), 2:51. Chiefs 10–0. **Drive: 4 plays, 77 yards, 2:01.**

**Second quarter**

- SD − Nick Novak 44-yard field goal, 8:31. Chiefs 10–3. **Drive: 6 plays, 46 yards, 3:04.**
- KC – Ryan Succop 47-yard field goal, 0:03. Chiefs 13–3. **Drive: 6 plays, 29 yards, 1:08.**

**Third quarter**

- SD − Nick Novak 44-yard field goal, 8:10. Chiefs 13–6. **Drive: 10 plays, 62 yards, 5:28.**
- SD − Nick Novak 42-yard field goal, 6:01. Chiefs 13–9. **Drive: 4 plays, 4 yards, 1:45.**
- SD − Nick Novak 26-yard field goal, 1:45. Chiefs 13–12. **Drive: 7 plays, 54 yards, 2:05.**

**Fourth quarter**

- KC – Jackie Battle 1-yard run (Ryan Succop kick), 12:01. Chiefs 20–12. **Drive: 10 plays, 74 yards, 4:44.**
- SD – Curtis Brinkley 2-yard run (Philip Rivers–Curtis Brinkley pass), 7:11. Tied 20–20. **Drive: 10 plays, 80 yards, 4:50.**

**Overtime**

- KC – Ryan Succop 30-yard field goal, 5:16. Chiefs 23–20. **Drive: 14 plays, 69 yards, 7:28.**

**Top passers**

- SD – Philip Rivers – 26/41, 369 yards, 2 INT
- KC – Matt Cassel – 15/30, 261 yards, TD, 2 INT

**Top rushers**

- SD – Ryan Mathews – 13 rushes, 57 yards
- KC – Jackie Battle – 19 rushes, 70 yards, TD

**Top receivers**

- SD – Malcom Floyd – 5 receptions, 107 yards
- KC – Jon Baldwin – 5 receptions, 82 yards, TD

==== Week 9: vs. Miami Dolphins ====
Week 9: Miami Dolphins at Kansas City Chiefs – Game summary

| Quarter | 1 | 2 | 3 | 4 | Total |
|---|---|---|---|---|---|
| **Dolphins** | 7 | 7 | 14 | 3 | **31** |
| Chiefs | 3 | 0 | 0 | 0 | **3** |

at Arrowhead Stadium, Kansas City, Missouri

- Date: November 6
- Game time: 12:00 p.m. CST
- Game weather: Cloudy, 62 °F (17 °C)
- Game attendance: 72,263
- Referee: Walt Anderson
- TV announcers (CBS): Kevin Harlan and Solomon Wilcots
- Recap, Game Book

Game information

**First quarter**

- KC – Ryan Succop 43-yard field goal, 7:11. Chiefs 3–0. **Drive: 14 plays, 53 yards, 7:49.**
- MIA – Anthony Fasano 3-yard pass from Matt Moore (Dan Carpenter kick), 0:46. Dolphins 7–3. **Drive: 6 plays, 47 yards, 2:53.**

**Second quarter**

- MIA – Anthony Fasano 35-yard pass from Matt Moore (Dan Carpenter kick), 9:41. Dolphins 14–3. **Drive: 3 plays, 78 yards, 1:39.**

**Third quarter**

- MIA – Brandon Marshall 14-yard pass from Matt Moore (Dan Carpenter kick), 8:38. Dolphins 21–3. **Drive: 4 plays, 61 yards, 1:17.**
- MIA – Reggie Bush 28-yard run (Dan Carpenter kick), 6:41. Dolphins 28–3. **Drive: 2 plays, 46 yards, 0:52.**

**Fourth quarter**

- MIA – Dan Carpenter 42-yard field goal, 8:08. Dolphins 31–3. **Drive: 12 plays, 73 yards, 6:49.**

**Top passers**

- MIA – Matt Moore – 17/23, 244 yards, 3 TD
- KC – Matt Cassel – 20/39, 253 yards

**Top rushers**

- MIA – Reggie Bush – 13 rushes, 92 yards, TD
- KC – Jackie Battle – 14 rushes, 40 yards

**Top receivers**

- MIA – Brandon Marshall – 8 receptions, 106 yards, TD
- KC – Steve Breaston – 7 receptions, 115 yards

==== Week 10: vs. Denver Broncos ====
Week 10: Denver Broncos at Kansas City Chiefs – Game summary

| Quarter | 1 | 2 | 3 | 4 | Total |
|---|---|---|---|---|---|
| **Broncos** | 7 | 3 | 0 | 7 | **17** |
| Chiefs | 0 | 0 | 7 | 3 | **10** |

at Arrowhead Stadium, Kansas City, Missouri

- Date: November 13
- Game time: 12:00 p.m. CST
- Game weather: Sunny, 67 °F (19 °C)
- Game attendance: 72,908
- Referee: Ron Winter
- TV announcers (CBS): Bill Macatee and Steve Tasker
- Recap, Game Book

Game information

**First quarter**

- DEN – Tim Tebow 7-yard run (Matt Prater kick), 7:31. Broncos 7–0. **Drive: 8 plays, 57 yards, 2:11.**

**Second quarter**

- DEN – Matt Prater 38-yard field goal, 7:46. Broncos 10–0. **Drive: 8 plays, 34 yards, 4:32.**

**Third quarter**

- KC – Le'Ron McClain 1-yard pass from Matt Cassel (Ryan Succop kick), 8:10. Broncos 10–7. **Drive: 8 plays, 65 yards, 3:29.**

**Fourth quarter**

- DEN – Eric Decker 56-yard pass from Tim Tebow (Matt Prater kick), 6:44. Broncos 17–7. **Drive: 8 plays, 80 yards, 5:21.**
- KC – Ryan Succop 32-yard field goal, 0:07. Broncos 17–10. **Drive: 8 plays, 55 yards, 1:48.**

**Top passers**

- DEN – Tim Tebow – 2/8, 69 yards, TD
- KC – Matt Cassel – 13/28, 93 yards, TD

**Top rushers**

- DEN – Lance Ball – 30 rushes, 96 yards
- KC – Jackie Battle – 9 rushes, 61 yards

**Top receivers**

- DEN – Eric Decker – 1 receptions, 56 yards, TD
- KC – Dexter McCluster – 6 receptions, 48 yards

==== Week 11: at New England Patriots ====
Week 11: Kansas City Chiefs at New England Patriots – Game summary

| Quarter | 1 | 2 | 3 | 4 | Total |
|---|---|---|---|---|---|
| Chiefs | 3 | 0 | 0 | 0 | **3** |
| **Patriots** | 0 | 10 | 17 | 7 | **34** |

at Gillette Stadium, Foxborough, Massachusetts

- Date: November 21
- Game time: 8:30 p.m. EST/7:30 p.m. CST
- Game weather: Clear and cold, 33 °F (1 °C)
- Game attendance: 68,756
- Referee: Clete Blakeman
- TV announcers (ESPN): Mike Tirico, Ron Jaworski, Jon Gruden and Suzy Kolber
- Recap, Game Book

Game information

**First quarter**

- KC – Ryan Succop 26-yard field goal, 1:30. Chiefs 3–0. **Drive: 9 plays, 45 yards, 5:12.**

**Second quarter**

- NE – Rob Gronkowski 52-yard pass from Tom Brady (Stephen Gostkowski kick), 4:18. Patriots 7–3. **Drive: 6 plays, 85 yards, 3:18.**
- NE – Stephen Gostkowski 21-yard field goal, 0:10. Patriots 10–3. **Drive: 8 plays, 51 yards, 1:51.**

**Third quarter**

- NE – Rob Gronkowski 19-yard pass from Tom Brady (Stephen Gostkowski kick), 10:27. Patriots 17–3. **Drive: 9 plays, 85 yards, 4:33.**
- NE – Julian Edelman 72-yard punt return (Stephen Gostkowski kick), 9:24. Patriots 24–3.
- NE – Stephen Gostkowski 19-yard field goal, 0:00. Patriots 27–3. **Drive: 9 plays, 50 yards, 4:47.**

**Fourth quarter**

- NE – Shane Vereen 4-yard run (Stephen Gostkowski kick), 1:01. Patriots 34–3. **Drive: 14 plays, 62 yards, 5:31.**

**Top passers**

- KC – Tyler Palko – 24/37, 230 yards, 3 INT
- NE – Tom Brady – 15/27, 234 yards, 2 TD

**Top rushers**

- KC – Thomas Jones – 8 rushes, 48 yards
- NE – BenJarvus Green-Ellis – 20 rushes, 81 yards

**Top receivers**

- KC – Dwayne Bowe – 7 receptions, 87 yards
- NE – Rob Gronkowski – 4 receptions, 96 yards, 2 TD

==== Week 12: vs. Pittsburgh Steelers ====
Week 12: Pittsburgh Steelers at Kansas City Chiefs – Game summary

| Quarter | 1 | 2 | 3 | 4 | Total |
|---|---|---|---|---|---|
| **Steelers** | 0 | 13 | 0 | 0 | **13** |
| Chiefs | 3 | 3 | 0 | 3 | **9** |

at Arrowhead Stadium, Kansas City, Missouri

- Date: November 27
- Game time: 7:20 p.m. CST
- Game weather: Clear, 32 °F (0 °C)
- Game attendance: 72,173
- Referee: Ed Hochuli
- TV announcers (NBC): Al Michaels, Cris Collinsworth and Michele Tafoya
- Recap, Game Book

Game information

**First quarter**

- KC – Ryan Succop 41-yard field goal, 10:40. Chiefs 3–0. **Drive: 11 plays, 57 yards, 4:20.**

**Second quarter**

- PIT – Shaun Suisham 21-yard field goal, 13:29. Tied 3–3. **Drive: 4 plays, 4 yards, 1:31.**
- PIT – Weslye Saunders 2-yard pass from Ben Roethlisberger (Shaun Suisham Kick), 10:53. Steelers 10–3. **Drive: 5 plays, 24 yards, 2:29.**
- KC – Ryan Succop 49-yard field goal, 4:30. Steelers 10–6. **Drive: 9 plays, 38 yards, 3:20.**
- PIT – Shaun Suisham 49-yard field goal, 0:00. Steelers 13–6. **Drive: 9 plays, 47 yards, 4:30.**

**Third quarter**

- No scoring plays.

**Fourth quarter**

- KC – Ryan Succop 40-yard field goal, 7.11 Steelers 13–9. **Drive: 13 plays, 70 yards, 6:11.**

**Top passers**

- PIT – Ben Roethlisberger – 21/31, 193 yards, TD, INT
- KC – Tyler Palko – 18/28, 167 yards, 3 INT

**Top rushers**

- PIT – Rashard Mendenhall – 17 rushes, 57 yards
- KC – Thomas Jones – 13 rushes, 37 yards

**Top receivers**

- PIT – Antonio Brown – 4 receptions, 81 yards
- KC – Dwayne Bowe – 7 receptions, 69 yards

Hoping to snap a three-game losing streak, the Chiefs went home for a Week 12 Sunday night duel with the Pittsburgh Steelers. Kansas City delivered the game's first punch in the opening quarter with a 41-yard field goal from kicker Ryan Succop. The Steelers would answer in the second quarter with kicker Shaun Suisham getting a 21-yard field goal, followed by quarterback Ben Roethlisberger completing a 2-yard touchdown pass to tight end Weslye Saunders. The Chiefs would reply with a 49-yard field goal from Succop, but Pittsburgh would close out the half with Suisham booting a 49-yard field goal. After a scoreless third quarter, Kansas City began to chip away at their deficit in the fourth quarter with a 40-yard field goal from Succop. However, the Steelers' defense held on to preserve the win.

With the loss, the Chiefs fell to 4–7.

==== Week 13: at Chicago Bears ====
Week 13: Kansas City Chiefs at Chicago Bears – Game summary

| Quarter | 1 | 2 | 3 | 4 | Total |
|---|---|---|---|---|---|
| **Chiefs** | 0 | 7 | 3 | 0 | **10** |
| Bears | 0 | 3 | 0 | 0 | **3** |

at Soldier Field, Chicago, Illinois

- Date: December 4
- Game time: 12:00 p.m. CST
- Game weather: Cloudy, 46 °F (8 °C)
- Game attendance: 61,973
- Referee: Jerome Boger
- TV announcers (CBS): Kevin Harlan and Solomon Wilcots
- Recap, Game Book

Game information

**First quarter**

- No scoring plays.

**Second quarter**

- CHI – Robbie Gould 32-yard field goal, 9:49. Bears 3–0. **Drive: 9 plays, 36 yards, 4:47.**
- KC – Dexter McCluster 38-yard pass from Tyler Palko (Ryan Succop kick), 0:00. Chiefs 7–3. **Drive: 16 plays, 87 yards, 4:16.**

**Third quarter**

- KC – Ryan Succop 21-yard field goal, 6:16. Chiefs 10–3. **Drive: 15 plays, 86 yards, 7:10.**

**Fourth quarter**

- No scoring plays.

**Top passers**

- KC – Tyler Palko – 17/30, 157 yards, TD
- CHI – Caleb Hanie – 11/24, 133 yards, 3 INT

**Top rushers**

- KC – Dexter McCluster – 9 rushes, 61 yards
- CHI – Marion Barber – 14 rushes, 44 yards

**Top receivers**

- KC – Dwayne Bowe – 4 receptions, 49 yards
- CHI – Johnny Knox – 5 receptions, 53 yards

==== Week 14: at New York Jets ====
Week 14: Kansas City Chiefs at New York Jets – Game summary

| Quarter | 1 | 2 | 3 | 4 | Total |
|---|---|---|---|---|---|
| Chiefs | 3 | 0 | 0 | 7 | **10** |
| **Jets** | 7 | 21 | 7 | 2 | **37** |

at MetLife Stadium, East Rutherford, New Jersey

- Date: December 11
- Game time: 1:00 p.m. EST/12:00 p.m. CST
- Game weather: Sunny, 37 °F (3 °C)
- Game attendance: 79,088
- Referee: Terry McAulay
- TV announcers (CBS): Ian Eagle and Dan Fouts
- Recap, Game Book

Game information

**First quarter**

- NYJ – Mark Sanchez 1-yard run (Nick Folk kick), 8:40. Jets 7–0. **Drive: 11 plays, 77 yards, 6:20.**
- KC – Ryan Succop 53-yard field goal, 4:36. Jets 7–3. **Drive: 4 plays, 6 yards, 1:38.**

**Second quarter**

- NYJ – Santonio Holmes 4-yard pass from Mark Sanchez (Nick Folk kick), 10:02. Jets 14–3. **Drive: 3 plays, 38 yards, 1:04.**
- NYJ – Shonn Greene 7-yard run (Nick Folk kick), 3:56. Jets 21–3. **Drive: 9 plays, 69 yards, 4:27.**
- NYJ – LaDainian Tomlinson 19-yard pass from Mark Sanchez (Nick Folk kick), 1:15. Jets 28–3. **Drive: 4 plays, 35 yards, 1:17.**

**Third quarter**

- NYJ – Mark Sanchez 3-yard run (Nick Folk kick), 4:06. Jets 35–3. **Drive: 6 plays, 90 yards, 4:08.**

**Fourth quarter**

- KC – Jerheme Urban 24-yard pass from Tyler Palko (Ryan Succop kick), 12:58. Jets 35–10. **Drive: 10 plays, 65 yards, 2:50.**
- NYJ – Jackie Battle tackled in end zone by Sione Po'uha for a Safety, 3:37. Jets 37–10.

**Top passers**

- KC – Tyler Palko – 16/32, 195 yards, TD, INT
- NYJ – Mark Sanchez – 13/21, 181 yards, 2 TD

**Top rushers**

- KC – Jackie Battle – 10 rushes, 33 yards
- NYJ – Shonn Greene – 24 rushes, 129 yards, TD

**Top receivers**

- KC – Dwayne Bowe – 6 receptions, 69 yards
- NYJ – Shonn Greene – 3 receptions, 58 yards

The Jets won easily in a crushing rout, with the final score overstating the closeness of the game as the Chief's only touchdown came in garbage time after the game was already decided. The Chiefs offense gained only 4 total yards in the first two quarters. The Chiefs were also plagued with penalties, finishing the game with 11 penalties total. The Jets' final touchdown drive in the third quarter proved to be a particularly humiliating stretch. Starting from their own 10 yard line, the Jets gained 81 penalty yards on 5 penalties committed by the Chiefs, including a rare penalty directly assessed against head coach Todd Haley for unsportsmanlike conduct. The Jets offense gained only 9 net yards on the drive, however they were still able to score a touchdown. After the game, Haley was fired mid-season; writers speculated that Haley's penalty, as well as the team's overall poor performance and discipline that game, was to blame.

==== Week 15: vs. Green Bay Packers ====
Week 15: Green Bay Packers at Kansas City Chiefs – Game summary

| Quarter | 1 | 2 | 3 | 4 | Total |
|---|---|---|---|---|---|
| Packers | 0 | 0 | 7 | 7 | **14** |
| **Chiefs** | 6 | 0 | 3 | 10 | **19** |

at Arrowhead Stadium, Kansas City, Missouri

- Date: December 18
- Game time: 12:00 p.m. CST
- Game weather: Sunny, 50 °F (10 °C)
- Game attendance: 74,093
- Referee: Gene Steratore
- TV announcers (Fox): Kenny Albert, Daryl Johnston and Tony Siragusa
- Recap, Game Book

Game information

**First quarter**

- KC – Ryan Succop 19-yard field goal, 8:56. Chiefs 3–0. **Drive: 14 plays, 79 yards, 6:04.**
- KC – Ryan Succop 32-yard field goal, 0:11. Chiefs 6–0. **Drive: 9 plays, 42 yards, 3:58.**

**Second quarter**

- No scoring plays.

**Third quarter**

- GB – Donald Driver 2-yard pass from Aaron Rodgers (Mason Crosby kick), 8:04. Packers 7–6. **Drive: 6 plays, 54 yards, 2:21.**
- KC – Ryan Succop 46-yard field goal, 3:45. Chiefs 9–7. **Drive: 7 plays, 61 yards, 4:19.**

**Fourth quarter**

- KC – Ryan Succop 20-yard field goal, 11:28. Chiefs 12–7. **Drive: 7 plays, 59 yards, 3:21.**
- KC – Jackie Battle 1-yard run (Ryan Succop kick), 4:53. Chiefs 19–7. **Drive: 8 plays, 66 yards, 3:57.**
- GB – Aaron Rodgers 8-yard run (Mason Crosby kick), 2:04. Chiefs 19–14. **Drive: 9 plays, 80 yards, 2:49.**

**Top passers**

- GB – Aaron Rodgers – 17/35, 235 yards, TD
- KC – Kyle Orton – 23/31, 299 yards

**Top rushers**

- GB – Ryan Grant – 12 rushes, 66 yards
- KC – Thomas Jones – 15 rushes, 48 yards

**Top receivers**

- GB – Jermichael Finley – 3 receptions, 83 yards
- KC – Leonard Pope – 2 receptions, 72 yards

In one of the biggest upsets of the year, the Chiefs beat the heavily favored Green Bay Packers, ending their hopes of a perfect season. The Chiefs defense held Packers quarterback Aaron Rodgers to 235 yards, a 49% completion percentage, and his only game of the season without multiple passing touchdowns in what was Rodgers' worst game statistically of the season.

The game was the first game coached by defensive coordinator Romeo Crennel, who served as interim head coach after Haley's departure.

==== Week 16: vs. Oakland Raiders ====
Week 16: Oakland Raiders at Kansas City Chiefs – Game summary

| Quarter | 1 | 2 | 3 | 4 | OT | Total |
|---|---|---|---|---|---|---|
| **Raiders** | 3 | 0 | 7 | 3 | 3 | **16** |
| Chiefs | 3 | 0 | 3 | 7 | 0 | **13** |

at Arrowhead Stadium, Kansas City, Missouri

- Date: December 24
- Game time: 12:00 p.m. CST
- Game weather: Sunny, 38 °F (3 °C)
- Game attendance: 70,803
- Referee: Mike Carey
- TV announcers (CBS): Kevin Harlan and Solomon Wilcots
- Recap, Game Book

Game information

**First quarter**

- OAK – Sebastian Janikowski 28-yard field goal, 13:20. Raiders 3–0. **Drive: 4 plays, 4 yards, 1:40.**
- KC – Ryan Succop 23-yard field goal, 3:06. Tied 3–3. **Drive: 9 plays, 31 yards, 4:58.**

**Second quarter**

- No scoring plays.

**Third quarter**

- OAK – Denarius Moore 61-yard pass from Carson Palmer (Sebastian Janikowski kick), 8:52. Raiders 10–3. **Drive: 7 plays, 79 yards, 3:55.**
- KC – Ryan Succop 20-yard field goal, 3:30. Raiders 10–6. **Drive: 9 plays, 78 yards, 5:22.**

**Fourth quarter**

- OAK – Sebastian Janikowski 31-yard field goal, 2:57. Raiders 13–6. **Drive: 8 plays, 30 yards, 4:48.**
- KC – Dwayne Bowe 3-yard pass from Kyle Orton (Ryan Succop kick), 1:02. Tied 13–13. **Drive: 5 plays, 80 yards, 1:55.**

**Overtime**

- OAK – Sebastian Janikowski 36-yard field goal, 12:47. Raiders 16–13. **Drive: 4 plays, 58 yards, 2:13.**

**Top passers**

- OAK – Carson Palmer – 16/26, 237 yards, TD, 2 INT
- KC – Kyle Orton – 21/36, 300 yards, TD, 2 INT

**Top rushers**

- OAK – Michael Bush – 23 rushes, 70 yards
- KC – Jackie Battle – 14 rushes, 56 yards

**Top receivers**

- OAK – Denarius Moore – 4 receptions, 94 yards, TD
- KC – Dexter McCluster – 5 receptions, 89 yards

==== Week 17: at Denver Broncos ====
Week 17: Kansas City Chiefs at Denver Broncos – Game summary

| Quarter | 1 | 2 | 3 | 4 | Total |
|---|---|---|---|---|---|
| **Chiefs** | 7 | 0 | 0 | 0 | **7** |
| Broncos | 0 | 0 | 3 | 0 | **3** |

at Sports Authority Field at Mile High, Denver, Colorado

- Date: January 1
- Game time: 3:15 p.m. CST/2:15 p.m. MST
- Game weather: Sunny, 35 °F (2 °C)
- Game attendance: 76,005
- Referee: Pete Morelli
- TV announcers (CBS): Jim Nantz and Phil Simms
- Recap, Game Book

Game information

**First quarter**

- KC – Dexter McCluster 21-yard run (Ryan Succop kick), 0:11. Chiefs 7–0. **Drive: 13 plays, 90 yards, 6:22.**

**Second quarter**

- No scoring plays.

**Third quarter**

- DEN – Matt Prater 38-yard field goal, 8:11. Chiefs 7–3. **Drive: 4 plays, 0 yards, 1:30.**

**Fourth quarter**

- No scoring plays.

**Top passers**

- KC – Kyle Orton – 15/29, 180 yards
- DEN – Tim Tebow – 6/22, 60 yards, INT

**Top rushers**

- KC – Dexter McCluster – 12 rushes, 61 yards, TD
- DEN – Willis McGahee – 28 rushes, 145 yards

**Top receivers**

- KC – Dwayne Bowe – 6 receptions, 93 yards
- DEN – Demaryius Thomas – 3 receptions, 34 yards

=== Standings ===
==== Division ====
AFC West
| | W | L | T | PCT | DIV | CONF | PF | PA | STK |
|---|---|---|---|---|---|---|---|---|---|
| ^{(4)} Denver Broncos | 8 | 8 | 0 | .500 | 3–3 | 6–6 | 309 | 390 | L3 |
| San Diego Chargers | 8 | 8 | 0 | .500 | 3–3 | 7–5 | 406 | 377 | W1 |
| Oakland Raiders | 8 | 8 | 0 | .500 | 3–3 | 6–6 | 359 | 433 | L1 |
| Kansas City Chiefs | 7 | 9 | 0 | .438 | 3–3 | 4–8 | 212 | 338 | W1 |

==== Conference ====
AFC
| # | Team | Division | W | L | T | PCT | DIV | CONF | SOS | SOV | STK |
|---|---|---|---|---|---|---|---|---|---|---|---|
**Division winners**
| 1 | New England Patriots | East | 13 | 3 | 0 | .813 | 5–1 | 10–2 | .449 | .423 | W8 |
| 2 (Note: Baltimore clinched the AFC North title based on a head-to-head sweep over Pittsburgh.) | Baltimore Ravens | North | 12 | 4 | 0 | .750 | 6–0 | 9–3 | .477 | .484 | W2 |
| 3 | Houston Texans | South | 10 | 6 | 0 | .625 | 4–2 | 8–4 | .453 | .413 | L3 |
| 4 (Note: Denver clinched the AFC West title instead of San Diego or Oakland based on common record (5–5 to San Diego's and Oakland's 4–6).) | Denver Broncos | West | 8 | 8 | 0 | .500 | 3–3 | 6–6 | .520 | .445 | L3 |
**Wild cards**
| 5 | Pittsburgh Steelers | North | 12 | 4 | 0 | .750 | 4–2 | 9–3 | .492 | .411 | W2 |
| 6 (Note: Cincinnati clinched the AFC 6 seed instead of Tennessee based on a head-to-head victory.) | Cincinnati Bengals | North | 9 | 7 | 0 | .563 | 2–4 | 6–6 | .492 | .326 | L1 |
**Did not qualify for the postseason**
| 7 | Tennessee Titans | South | 9 | 7 | 0 | .563 | 3–3 | 7–5 | .461 | .396 | W2 |
| 8 (Note: New York Jets finished ahead of San Diego based on head-to-head victory.) | New York Jets | East | 8 | 8 | 0 | .500 | 3–3 | 6–6 | .500 | .395 | L3 |
| 9 (Note: San Diego finished ahead of Oakland in the AFC West based on conference record (7–5 to 6–6).) | San Diego Chargers | West | 8 | 8 | 0 | .500 | 3–3 | 7–5 | .516 | .430 | W1 |
| 10 | Oakland Raiders | West | 8 | 8 | 0 | .500 | 3–3 | 6–6 | .504 | .438 | L1 |
| 11 | Kansas City Chiefs | West | 7 | 9 | 0 | .438 | 3–3 | 4–8 | .512 | .464 | W1 |
| 12 (Note: Miami finished ahead of Buffalo based on head-to-head sweep.) | Miami Dolphins | East | 6 | 10 | 0 | .375 | 3–3 | 5–7 | .504 | .417 | W1 |
| 13 | Buffalo Bills | East | 6 | 10 | 0 | .375 | 1–5 | 4–8 | .520 | .510 | L1 |
| 14 | Jacksonville Jaguars | South | 5 | 11 | 0 | .313 | 3–3 | 4–8 | .500 | .363 | W1 |
| 15 | Cleveland Browns | North | 4 | 12 | 0 | .250 | 0–6 | 3–9 | .531 | .313 | L6 |
| 16 | Indianapolis Colts | South | 2 | 14 | 0 | .125 | 2–4 | 2–10 | .539 | .594 | L1 |
**Tiebreakers** (Note: When breaking ties for three or more teams under the NFL's rules, they are first broken within divisions, then comparing only the highest ranked remaining team from each division.)
