= Brandon Carr =

American football player (born 1986)

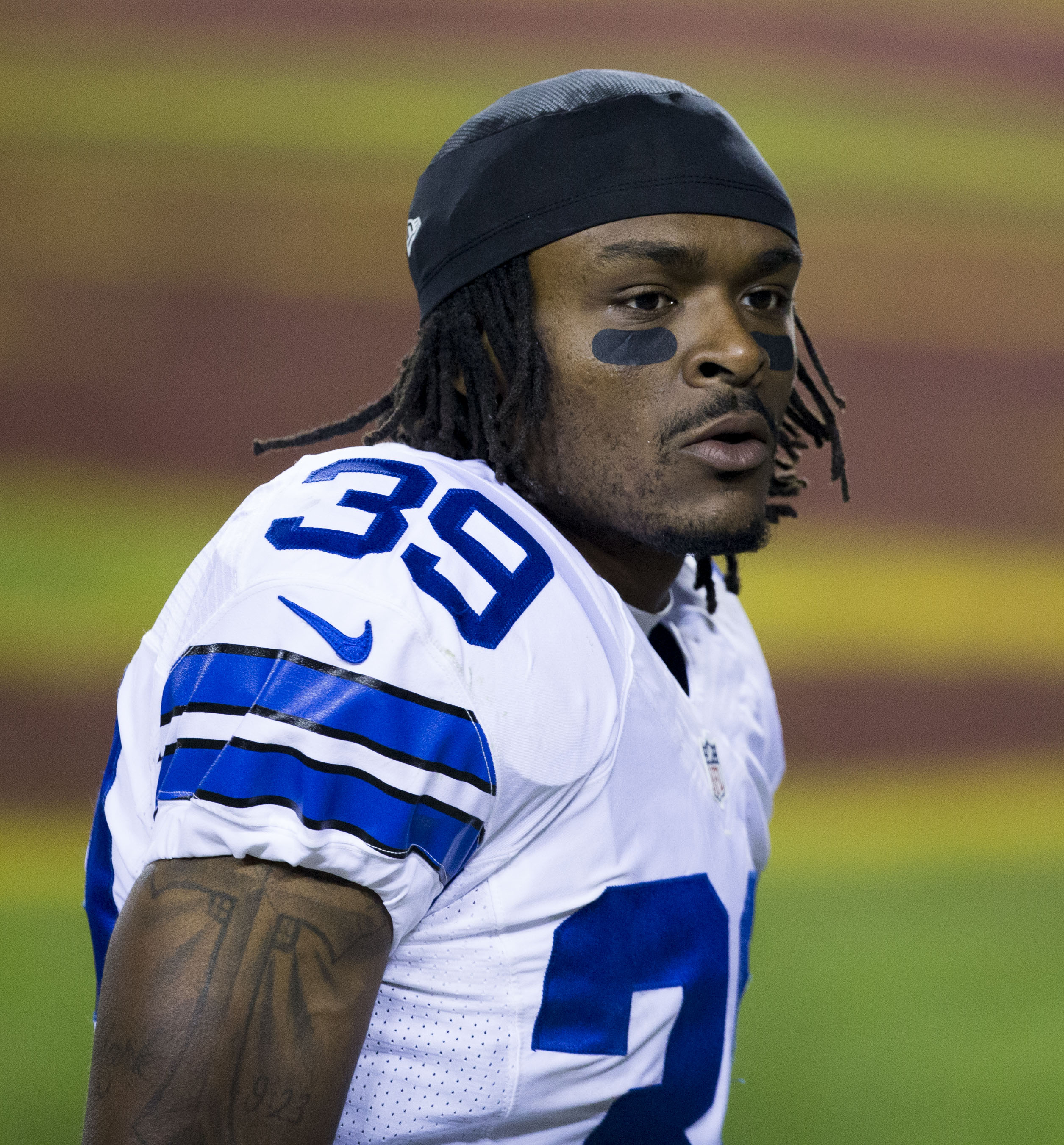
- Carr with the Dallas Cowboys in 2015

No. 39, 24
- Position: Cornerback

Personal information
- Born: May 19, 1986 (age 40); Flint, Michigan, U.S.
- Listed height: 6 ft 0 in (1.83 m)
- Listed weight: 210 lb (95 kg)

Career information
- High school: Carman-Ainsworth (Flint Township, Michigan)
- College: Grand Valley State (2004–2007)
- NFL draft: 2008: 5th round, 140th overall pick

Career history
- Kansas City Chiefs (2008–2011); Dallas Cowboys (2012–2016); Baltimore Ravens (2017–2019); Dallas Cowboys (2020)

Awards and highlights
- 2× Division II All-American (2006–2007); 2× First-team All-GLIAC (2006–2007); GLIAC Defensive Back of the Year (2007)

Career NFL statistics
- Games played: 195
- Total tackles: 703
- Sacks: 3
- Forced fumbles: 1
- Fumble recoveries: 9
- Interceptions: 21
- Defensive touchdowns: 2
- Stats at Pro Football Reference

Brandon Carey Carr (born May 19, 1986) is an American former professional football player who was a cornerback in the National Football League (NFL) for the Kansas City Chiefs, Dallas Cowboys, and Baltimore Ravens. He played college football for the Grand Valley State Lakers and was selected by the Chiefs in the fifth round of the 2008 NFL draft. Carr was the active leader for consecutive starts by an NFL defensive player. He also gained notoriety for being the player covering Odell Beckham Jr. during his famous catch.

== Early life ==
Carr was born and raised in Flint, Michigan. He attended Carman Ainsworth High School. Carr was a two-way player as a senior, making 53 tackles and two interceptions at cornerback, while having 24 receptions for 431 yards and four touchdowns at wide receiver.

Carr was named to the All-conference defensive team at the end of the season. He also lettered in basketball.

== College career ==
At Division II Grand Valley State, Carr played in 49 games, starting 41. He made 206 tackles (147 solo) and 11 interceptions, and defended 39 passes in his college career.

As a sophomore and junior, Carr helped the Lakers win back-to-back NCAA Division II Football Championships. As a senior, he played in all 13 games, posting 45 tackles (33 solo), two interceptions, and defended 13 passes. Carr received the Defensive Back of the Year honor by Great Lakes Intercollegiate Athletic Conference for his senior season.

== Professional career ==
=== Pre-draft ===
Carr did not receive an invitation to the NFL Scouting Combine or to any All-Star games due to his limited exposure attending Grand Valley State. On March 10, 2008, Carr attended Central Michigan's pro day and performed the majority of drills, but opted to skip the bench press. He also attended a pre-draft visit with the Kansas City Chiefs. At the conclusion of the pre-draft process, Carr was projected to be a sixth or seventh-round pick by NFL draft experts and scouts. He was ranked as the 25th best cornerback prospect in the draft by DraftScout.com.

Pre-draft measurables
| Height | Weight | 40-yard dash | 10-yard split | 20-yard split | 20-yard shuttle | Three-cone drill | Vertical jump | Broad jump |
|---|---|---|---|---|---|---|---|---|
| 6 ft 0 1/8 in (1.83 m) | 207 lb (94 kg) | 4.43 s | 1.47 s | 2.57 s | 4.19 s | 6.80 s | 35 in (0.89 m) | 10 ft 4 in (3.15 m) |
All values from Central Michigan's Pro Day

=== Kansas City Chiefs ===
==== 2008 season ====
The Kansas City Chiefs selected Carr in the fifth round (140th overall) of the 2008 NFL draft. Carr was the 23rd cornerback drafted and the second cornerback drafted by the Chiefs in 2008. He also became the highest drafted player in Grand Valley State's school history. Carr was only the eighth player drafted from Grand Valley State and was the first player drafted from Grand Valley State since Keyonta Marshall was selected 247th overall in the 2005 NFL draft. During the draft, general manager Carl Peterson decided to allow head coach Herman Edwards to select their 140th overall pick as a gift for his 54th birthday which fell on the day of the draft. Edwards immediately responded, "I want Brandon Carr! I promise you this; By opening day, he'll be starting!"

On June 11, 2008, Carr signed a three-year, $1.36 million rookie contract that includes a signing bonus of $145,629. Throughout training camp, he competed against Brandon Flowers and Dimitri Patterson for a job as a starting cornerback. Head coach Herman Edwards named Carr the third cornerback and first-team nickelback to start the regular season, behind Patrick Surtain and Brandon Flowers.

Carr made his NFL debut and first career start in the season-opener at the New England Patriots and recorded three combined tackles in the 17–10 loss. On September 21, 2008, Carr earned his first start as an outside cornerback after Patrick Surtain injured his shoulder the previous week against the Oakland Raiders. He finished the Chiefs' 38–14 loss at the Atlanta Falcons with a season-high nine solo tackles. The following week, he made two solo tackles, three pass deflections, and made his first career interception off a pass by quarterback Jay Cutler during a 33–19 victory against the Denver Broncos in Week 4.

Carr finished his rookie year with 73 combined tackles (70 solo), six pass deflections, two interceptions, and two fumble recoveries in 16 games and starts. He started the first two games at nickelback and last 14 games at left cornerback.

==== 2009 season ====
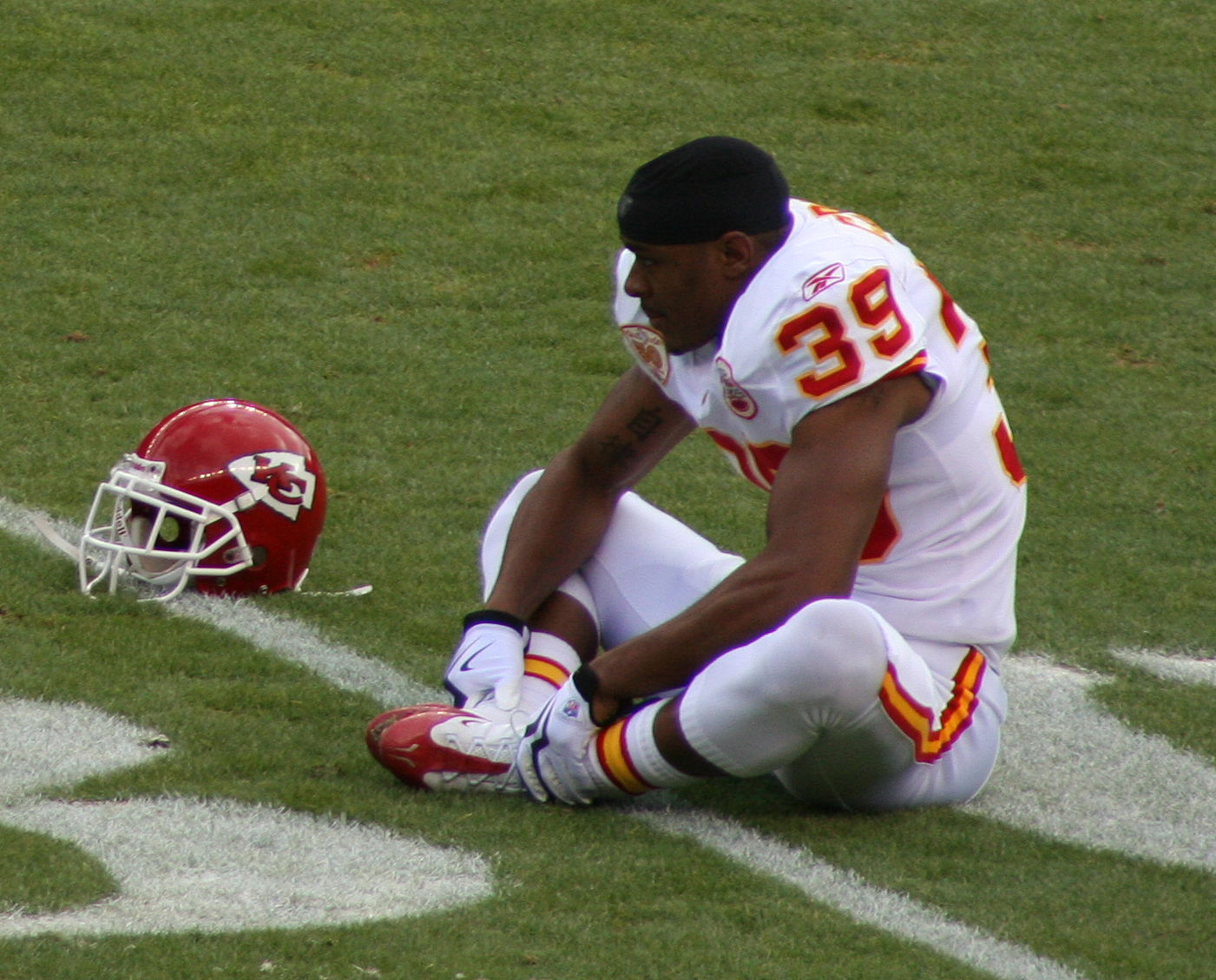
Carr stretching in January 2010

On January 23, 2009, the Chiefs fired head coach Herman Edwards after they finished with a 2–14 record in 2008. Carr and Flowers entered training camp slated as the starting cornerbacks under new defensive coordinator Clancy Pendergast. Carr saw minor competition for his role from Maurice Leggett and Ricardo Colclough. Head coach Todd Haley officially named Carr and Flowers the starting cornerback duo to begin the regular season.

During Week 4, Carr collected four solo tackles and a season-high three pass deflections in a 27–16 loss to the New York Giants. During Week 11, he recorded a season-high eight solo tackles in a 27–24 victory over the Pittsburgh Steelers.

Carr finished his second professional season with 62 combined tackles (56 solo), 19 passes defensed, two tackles for loss, an interception, a forced fumble, and a fumble recovery in 16 games and starts.

==== 2010 season ====
Carr and Flowers were retained as the starting cornerbacks entering camp under new defensive coordinator Romeo Crennel. Head coach Todd Haley officially named them the starters to begin 2010.

During Week 5, Carr recorded a season-high eight combined tackles and a pass deflection during a 19–9 loss at the Indianapolis Colts. On December 12, 2010, he tied his season-high of eight combined tackles in the Chiefs' 31–0 loss at the San Diego Chargers in Week 14. He finished the 2010 season with 57 combined tackles (46 solo), 25 pass deflections, and an interception in 16 games and 16 starts.

The Chiefs finished first atop the AFC West with a 10–6 record. On January 9, 2011, Carr started in his first NFL playoff game and made three solo tackles in a 30–7 loss to the Baltimore Ravens in the AFC Wildcard Game.

==== 2011 season ====
Carr and Flowers entered the 2011 season as the starting cornerbacks ahead of Javier Arenas and Jalil Brown.

During Week 8, Carr recorded a season-high six solo tackles in the Chiefs' 23–20 win against the San Diego Chargers. On December 11, 2011, he made one tackle and a season-high three pass deflections during a 37–10 loss at the New York Jets in Week 14. In the regular-season finale, Carr recorded two combined tackles, deflected two passes, and an interception in the Chiefs' 7–3 win at the Denver Broncos in Week 17. He intercepted Tim Tebow's pass that was intended for Eddie Royal and sealed the Chiefs' victory on the last defensive play in the fourth quarter.

Carr finished the season with 45 combined tackles (39 solo), 15 passes defensed, and four interceptions in 16 games and starts. During the season, Carr's averaged a 46% completion rate among opposing quarterbacks and gave up only three touchdowns.

==== 2012 season ====
Carr became an unrestricted free agent after the 2011 season and was regarded by analysts as the top cornerback available in free agency. On March 11, 2012, Carr attended a private meeting with the Dallas Cowboys on the first day of free agency.

=== Dallas Cowboys ===
On March 14, 2012, the Dallas Cowboys signed Carr to a five-year, $50.1 million contract with $26.5 million guaranteed and a signing bonus of $10 million.

==== 2012 season ====
Carr entered training camp slated as the Cowboys' No. 1 cornerback, replacing Terence Newman. Head coach Jason Garrett officially named him the starter to begin the regular season, alongside rookie Morris Claiborne and ahead of Orlando Scandrick and Mike Jenkins.

On November 11, 2012, Carr recorded four solo tackles, a pass deflection, and returned an interception for his first NFL touchdown during a 38–23 victory at the Philadelphia Eagles in Week 10. He intercepted a pass by quarterback Nick Foles in the fourth quarter and returned it for a 47-yard touchdown. During Week 15, he made four solo tackles, a season-high three pass deflections, and made a key interception in overtime to help the Cowboys' defeat the Pittsburgh Steelers 27–24. His interception occurred off a pass by Ben Roethlisberger that was intended for Mike Wallace with 41 seconds remaining in overtime. The following week, Carr collected a season-high six combined tackles in the Cowboys' 34–31 loss to the New Orleans Saints in Week 16. He finished the 2012 season with 53 combined tackles (48 solo), 11 pass deflections, and three interceptions in 16 games and 16 starts.

Carr led the team in interceptions and pass deflections in his first season with the Cowboys and started his 100th career game.

==== 2013 season ====
Defensive coordinator Monte Kiffin retained Carr and Claiborne as the starting cornerbacks after Rob Ryan was fired after the 2012 season. He started in the Dallas Cowboys' season-opener against the New York Giants and recorded four solo tackles, broke up a pass, and returned an interception for a touchdown in a 36–31 victory. The interception occurred off a pass attempt by Eli Manning that was intended for running back Da'Rel Scott and returned it for a 49-yard touchdown in the fourth quarter. In Week 8, he collected a season-high nine combined tackles and deflected a pass in a 31–30 loss at the Detroit Lions. The following week, he made a season-high eight solo tackles and broke up a pass during a 27–23 win against the Minnesota Vikings in Week 9.

Carr finished the season with 71 combined tackles (60 solo), 12 pass deflections, three interceptions, and a touchdown in 16 games and 16 starts.

==== 2014 season ====
The Cowboys promoted Rod Marinelli to defensive coordinator and moved Kiffin to a defensive assistant role. Head coach Jason Garrett opted to retain Carr and Claiborne as the starting cornerbacks duo with Orlando Scandrick as their nickelback to begin the season. On October 5, 2014, Carr collected a season-high eight combined tackles and deflected a pass in the Cowboys' 20–17 loss to the Washington Redskins in Week 8. In Week 10, he recorded five solo tackles and made his first career sack on Chad Henne during a 31–17 victory at the Jacksonville Jaguars.

Carr finished the 2014 season with 54 combined tackles (45 solo), seven pass deflections, and a sack in 16 games and starts. He was held without an interception for the first time in his first seven seasons.

The Cowboys finished atop the NFC East with a 12–4 record. On January 4, 2015, Carr started in the NFC Wildcard Game and recorded six solo tackles and a pass deflection during the Cowboys' 24–20 win against the Detroit Lions. The following week, he made three solo tackles as the Cowboys were eliminated from the playoffs after losing 26–21 at the Green Bay Packers in the NFC Divisional Round.

==== 2015 season ====
During Week 3, Carr recorded a season-high eight combined tackles during a 39–28 loss to the Atlanta Falcons. Four weeks later, he collected a season-high seven solo tackles in a 27–20 loss at the New York Giants. In Week 14, he tied his season-high of eight combined tackles and deflected a pass in a 28–7 loss at the Green Bay Packers.

Carr finished the 2015 season with 76 combined tackles (60 solo) and six pass deflections in 16 games and starts. He started his 148th consecutive game but was held without an interception for the second consecutive season.

==== 2016 season ====
On April 25, 2016, it was reported that Carr agreed to a pay cut from $9.1 million to $4.25 million plus incentives, in order to remain with the Cowboys for the 2016 season.

Carr started in the season-opener against the New York Giants and made two solo tackles, a pass deflection, and intercepted a pass by Eli Manning to end his 36-game interception drought in the narrow 20–19 loss. During Week 8, he collected a season-high seven solo tackles and broke up a pass in a 29–23 overtime victory over the Philadelphia Eagles. In Week 13, Carr made eight combined tackles in the Cowboys' 17–15 victory at the Minnesota Vikings.

Carr finished the season with 61 combined tackles (53 solo), nine pass deflections, and an interception in 16 games and starts. He had a career resurgence in 2016 after defensive coordinator Rod Marinelli moved him to play the right outside cornerback position, where Carr experienced success with during his first four years in Kansas City. Pro Football Focus gave Carr an overall grade of 75.3, which ranked as the 52nd highest grade among the 116 qualifying cornerbacks in 2016.

The Cowboys finished atop the NFC East with a 13–3 record. On January 15, 2017, Carr made three solo tackles as the Cowboys lost 34–31 to the Green Bay Packers in the NFC Divisional Round.

==== 2017 season ====
Carr became an unrestricted free agent in 2017 and was regarded as one of the top five cornerbacks available in free agency. He received interest from the New York Jets and Baltimore Ravens after not receiving an offer to return to the Dallas Cowboys.

=== Baltimore Ravens ===
On March 16, 2017, the Baltimore Ravens signed Carr to a four-year, $23.50 million contract that includes a signing bonus of $4 million. The contract also includes an opt-out clause for the Ravens in 2018.

==== 2017 season ====
Head coach John Harbaugh officially named Carr a starting cornerback, along with Jimmy Smith, to start the regular season.

Carr started in the season-opener at the Cincinnati Bengals and recorded two solo tackles, two pass deflections, and intercepted a pass by Andy Dalton during the first quarter of a 20–0 shutout victory. In the next game, Carr recorded a season-high four pass deflections, three solo tackles, and intercepted a pass by DeShone Kizer in the fourth quarter of the Ravens' 24–10 victory over the Cleveland Browns. During Week 8, he collected a season-high seven solo tackles as the Ravens routed the Miami Dolphins 40–0. In Week 15, he made four solo tackles, a pass deflection, and an interception during a 27–10 road victory over the Browns.

Carr finished the 2017 season with 56 combined tackles (50 solo), 12 pass deflections, and tied his career-high with four interceptions in 16 games and starts. He extended his consecutive start streak to 160 games. Pro Football Focus gave him an overall grade of 74.1, which ranked 69th among all qualifying cornerbacks in 2017.

==== 2018 season ====
On March 13, 2018, the Ravens exercised the second-year option on Carr's four-year contract. Carr once again started all 16 games in 2018, extending his consecutive start streak, recording 45 combined tackles, 11 passes defensed, and two interceptions. He finished tied for the team-lead in interceptions and second in passes defensed.

==== 2019 season ====
Through the 2019 season, Carr was second among all NFL players in consecutive games started (192), behind only Chargers quarterback Philip Rivers (218 games) and ahead of Kansas City Chiefs offensive tackle Mitchell Schwartz (122). He appeared in 16 with 16 starts at both right cornerback and free safety, while making 49 tackles, 2 sacks and 6 passes defensed.

On March 18, 2020, the Ravens declined the option on Carr's contract, making him an unrestricted free agent.

=== Dallas Cowboys (second stint) ===
On September 6, 2020, Carr was signed to the Dallas Cowboys practice squad. He was elevated to the active roster six days later for the season opener against the Los Angeles Rams, and was reverted to the practice squad on September 14. Carr was promoted to the active roster the next day. He appeared in three games as a reserve player and had one tackle. Carr was released on October 6.

== NFL career statistics ==
Legend
| | Led the league |
| **Bold** | Career high |

=== Regular season ===
| Year | Team | Games | | Tackles | | | | Fumbles | | | | Interceptions | | | | | |
| Year | Team | GP | GS | Cmb | Solo | Ast | Sck | FF | FR | Yds | TD | PD | Int | Yds | Avg | Lng | TD |
|---|---|---|---|---|---|---|---|---|---|---|---|---|---|---|---|---|---|
| 2008 | KC | **16** | **16** | 73 | **70** | 3 | 0.0 | 0 | **2** | 17 | 0 | 6 | 2 | 67 | 33.5 | 35 | 0 |
| 2009 | KC | **16** | **16** | 62 | 56 | 6 | 0.0 | **1** | **2** | 1 | 0 | 19 | 1 | 31 | 31.0 | 31 | 0 |
| 2010 | KC | **16** | **16** | 57 | 46 | 11 | 0.0 | 0 | **2** | **23** | 0 | **25** | 1 | 0 | 0.0 | 0 | 0 |
| 2011 | KC | **16** | **16** | 45 | 39 | 6 | 0.0 | 0 | 0 | 0 | 0 | 15 | **4** | 17 | 4.3 | 14 | 0 |
| 2012 | DAL | **16** | **16** | 53 | 48 | 5 | 0.0 | 0 | 1 | 0 | 0 | 10 | 3 | **120** | **40.0** | 47T | **1** |
| 2013 | DAL | **16** | **16** | 71 | 60 | 11 | 0.0 | 0 | 1 | 21 | 0 | 12 | 3 | 49 | 16.3 | **49T** | **1** |
| 2014 | DAL | **16** | **16** | 54 | 45 | 9 | 1.0 | 0 | 1 | 0 | 0 | 7 | 0 | 0 | 0.0 | 0 | 0 |
| 2015 | DAL | **16** | **16** | **76** | 60 | **16** | 0.0 | 0 | 1 | 0 | 0 | 6 | 0 | 0 | 0 | 0 | 0 |
| 2016 | DAL | **16** | **16** | 61 | 53 | 8 | 0.0 | 0 | 1 | 0 | 0 | 9 | 1 | 0 | 0.0 | 0 | 0 |
| 2017 | BAL | **16** | **16** | 56 | 50 | 6 | 0.0 | 0 | 0 | 0 | 0 | 12 | **4** | 57 | 14.3 | 33 | 0 |
| 2018 | BAL | **16** | **16** | 45 | 39 | 6 | 0.0 | 0 | 0 | 0 | 0 | 11 | 2 | 32 | 16.0 | 32 | 0 |
| 2019 | BAL | **16** | **16** | 49 | 41 | 8 | **2.0** | 0 | 0 | 0 | 0 | 6 | 0 | 0 | 0.0 | 0 | 0 |
| 2020 | DAL | 3 | 0 | 1 | 1 | 0 | 0.0 | 0 | 0 | 0 | 0 | 0 | 0 | 0 | 0.0 | 0 | 0 |
| Career | | 195 | 192 | 703 | 608 | 95 | 3.0 | 1 | 9 | 67 | 0 | 138 | 21 | 367 | 17.5 | 49T | 2 |

=== Postseason ===
| Year | Team | Games | | Tackles | | | | Fumbles | | | | Interceptions | | | | | |
| Year | Team | GP | GS | Cmb | Solo | Ast | Sck | FF | FR | Yds | TD | PD | Int | Yds | Avg | Lng | TD |
|---|---|---|---|---|---|---|---|---|---|---|---|---|---|---|---|---|---|
| 2010 | KC | 1 | 1 | 3 | 3 | 0 | 0.0 | 0 | 0 | 0 | 0 | 0 | 0 | 0 | 0.0 | 0 | 0 |
| 2014 | DAL | **2** | **2** | **9** | **9** | 0 | 0.0 | 0 | 0 | 0 | 0 | **1** | 0 | 0 | 0.0 | 0 | 0 |
| 2016 | DAL | 1 | 1 | 3 | 3 | 0 | 0.0 | 0 | 0 | 0 | 0 | 0 | 0 | 0 | 0.0 | 0 | 0 |
| 2018 | BAL | 1 | 1 | 5 | 4 | **1** | 0.0 | 0 | 0 | 0 | 0 | 0 | 0 | 0 | 0.0 | 0 | 0 |
| 2019 | BAL | 1 | 1 | 0 | 0 | 0 | 0.0 | 0 | 0 | 0 | 0 | 0 | 0 | 0 | 0.0 | 0 | 0 |
| Career | | 6 | 6 | 20 | 19 | 1 | 0.0 | 0 | 0 | 0 | 0 | 0 | 0 | 0 | 0.0 | 0 | 0 |

== Personal life ==
In December 2012, Carr launched the Carr Cares Foundation. The foundation focuses on educational enrichment and physical fitness for youth. Influenced by Carr's passion for literacy and his love of sports, the foundation provides students in Dallas, Baltimore, and Flint, Michigan with opportunities to practice and perfect their literacy and athletic skills.
