= Brandon Flowers (American football) =

American football player (born 1986)

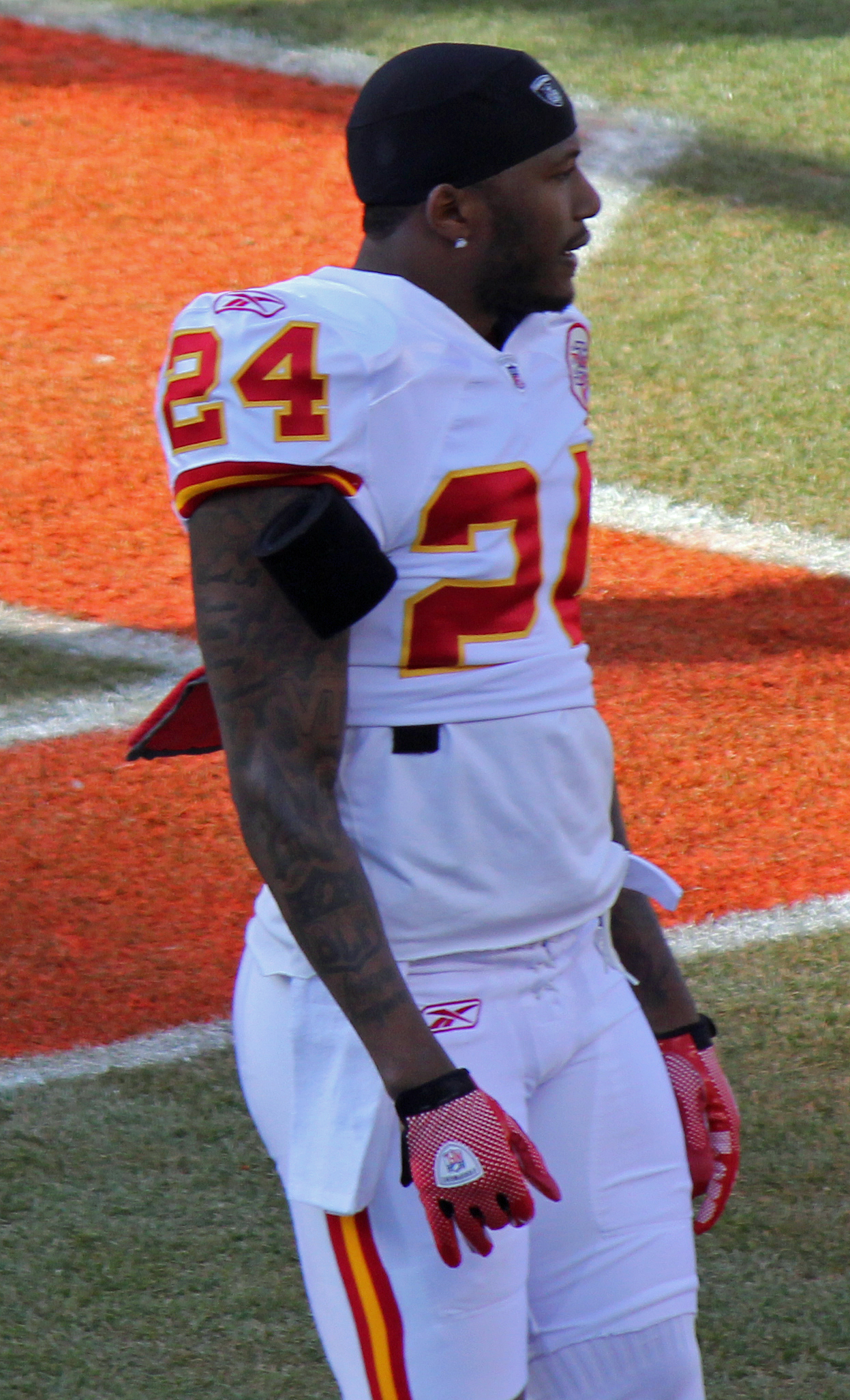
- Flowers with the Kansas City Chiefs in 2010

No. 24, 26
- Position: Cornerback

Personal information
- Born: February 18, 1986 (age 40); Delray Beach, Florida, U.S.
- Listed height: 5 ft 10 in (1.78 m)
- Listed weight: 190 lb (86 kg)

Career information
- High school: Atlantic Community (Delray Beach)
- College: Virginia Tech (2004–2007)
- NFL draft: 2008: 2nd round, 35th overall pick

Career history
- Kansas City Chiefs (2008–2013); San Diego Chargers (2014–2016)

Awards and highlights
- Pro Bowl (2013); PFWA All-Rookie Team (2008); First-team All-American (2007); Third-team All-American (2006); First-team All-ACC (2006); Second-team All-ACC (2007)

Career NFL statistics
- Total tackles: 487
- Sacks: 3
- Pass deflections: 110
- Interceptions: 21
- Forced fumbles: 4
- Defensive touchdowns: 4
- Stats at Pro Football Reference

Brandon Lavar Flowers (born February 18, 1986) is an American former professional football player who was a cornerback in the National Football League (NFL). He played college football for the Virginia Tech Hokies, and was selected by the Kansas City Chiefs in the second round of the 2008 NFL draft.

== Early life ==
Flowers played high school football while attending Atlantic Community High School, where he earned first-team all-area and all-conference honors. He was teammates with Omar Jacobs and David Clowney. Flowers then attended Hargrave Military Academy for prep school in 2003. At Hargrave, he was teammates with Jonathan Hefney, Brian Soi, DJ Ware, and Justin Harper. He also starred in basketball and track.

Although considered a three-star recruit, Flowers was not listed among the nation's top cornerback prospects by Rivals.com.

== College career ==
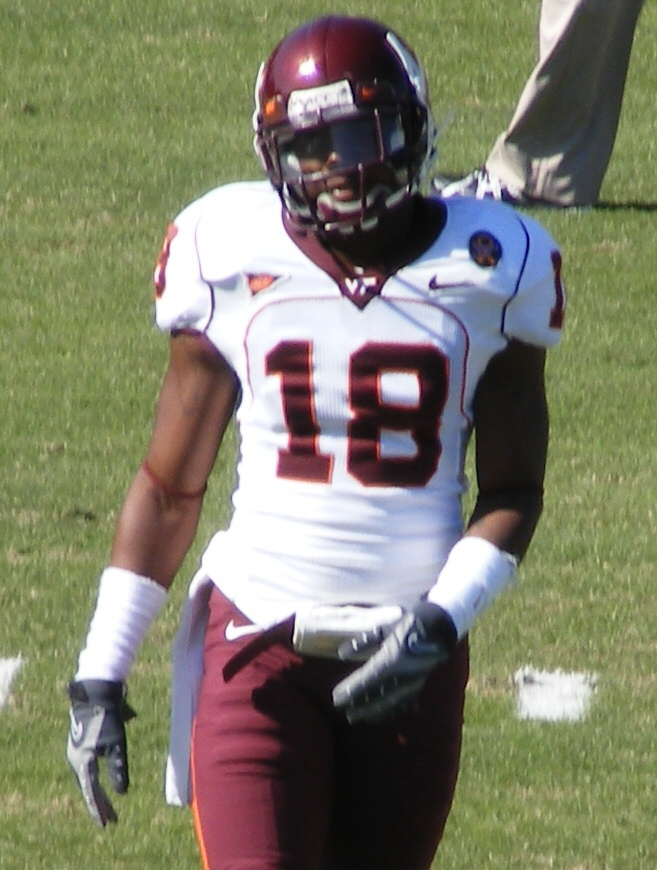
Flowers with Virginia Tech in 2007

Flowers attended Virginia Tech, where he majored in Sociology. In 2004; he did not play in the season opener vs. Southern California, but made a spectacular interception for a 38-yard return the following week vs. Western Michigan. He suffered a fractured right fibula later in the contest and missed the rest of the season. Flowers returned to action in 2005, posting 20 tackles (13 solo) with four pass deflections, 1 1/2 stops behind the line of scrimmage, and an interception.

As a sophomore in 2006, Flowers took over the boundary cornerback spot, going on to start his final 27 games with the Hokies. He earned All-American second-team and All-Atlantic Coast Conference first-team honors, leading the league with 21 passes defended, breaking up 18 throws and picking off three others. He totaled 51 tackles (29 solo) with 3.5 sacks and 7.5 stops for losses. He also caused a fumble and did not allow an opponent to catch any passes in three games.

As a junior in 2007, Flowers again received All-American and All-ACC recognition. In 2007, Flowers intercepted five passes and deflected nine others; he also ranked third on the team with 86 tackles (56 solo), including eight stops behind the line of scrimmage.

In 41 games at Virginia Tech, Flowers made 28 starts at cornerback, making 158 tackles (99 solo) with 3.5 sacks for minus-28 yards, 17 stops for losses of 71 yards and six quarterback pressures. He caused and recovered a fumble, deflected 32 passes, and intercepted 10 others for 172 yards in returns and two touchdowns. He also led the Atlantic Coast Conference in passes broken up (18) and passes defended (21).

Flowers decided to forgo his final year of eligibility to enter the 2008 NFL draft.

== Professional career ==
=== Pre-draft ===
NFL.com ranked Flowers as the sixth best cornerback prospect in the draft and projected that he would be selected in the first or second round. Sports Illustrated ranked Flowers as the eighth best cornerback prospect in the draft and described him as an "opportunistic cornerback with solid ball skills".

Pre-draft measurables
Height	Weight	Arm length	Hand span	40-yard dash	10-yard split	20-yard split	20-yard shuttle	Three-cone drill	Vertical jump	Broad jump	Bench press
5 ft 9 3/4 in (1.77 m)	189 lb (86 kg)	31 in (0.79 m)	8 5/8 in (0.22 m)	4.54 s	1.53 s	2.60 s	4.08 s	6.72 s	30 in (0.76 m)	9 ft 92 in (5.08 m)	14 reps
All values from NFL Combine/Pro Day

=== Kansas City Chiefs ===
==== 2008 ====
The Kansas City Chiefs selected Flowers in the second round (35th overall) of the 2008 NFL draft. He was the sixth cornerback drafted and the first of two cornerbacks selected by the Chiefs in 2008, along with fifth-round pick (140th overall) Brandon Carr. He was the highest selected Virginia Tech Hokies' defender since 2004 first-round pick (eighth overall) DeAngelo Hall. Patrick Surtain had recommended to the Chiefs that they should draft Flowers and also kept track of their interest into selecting him. He had known Patrick Surtain for more than a decade as Surtain's brother married Flowers first cousin.

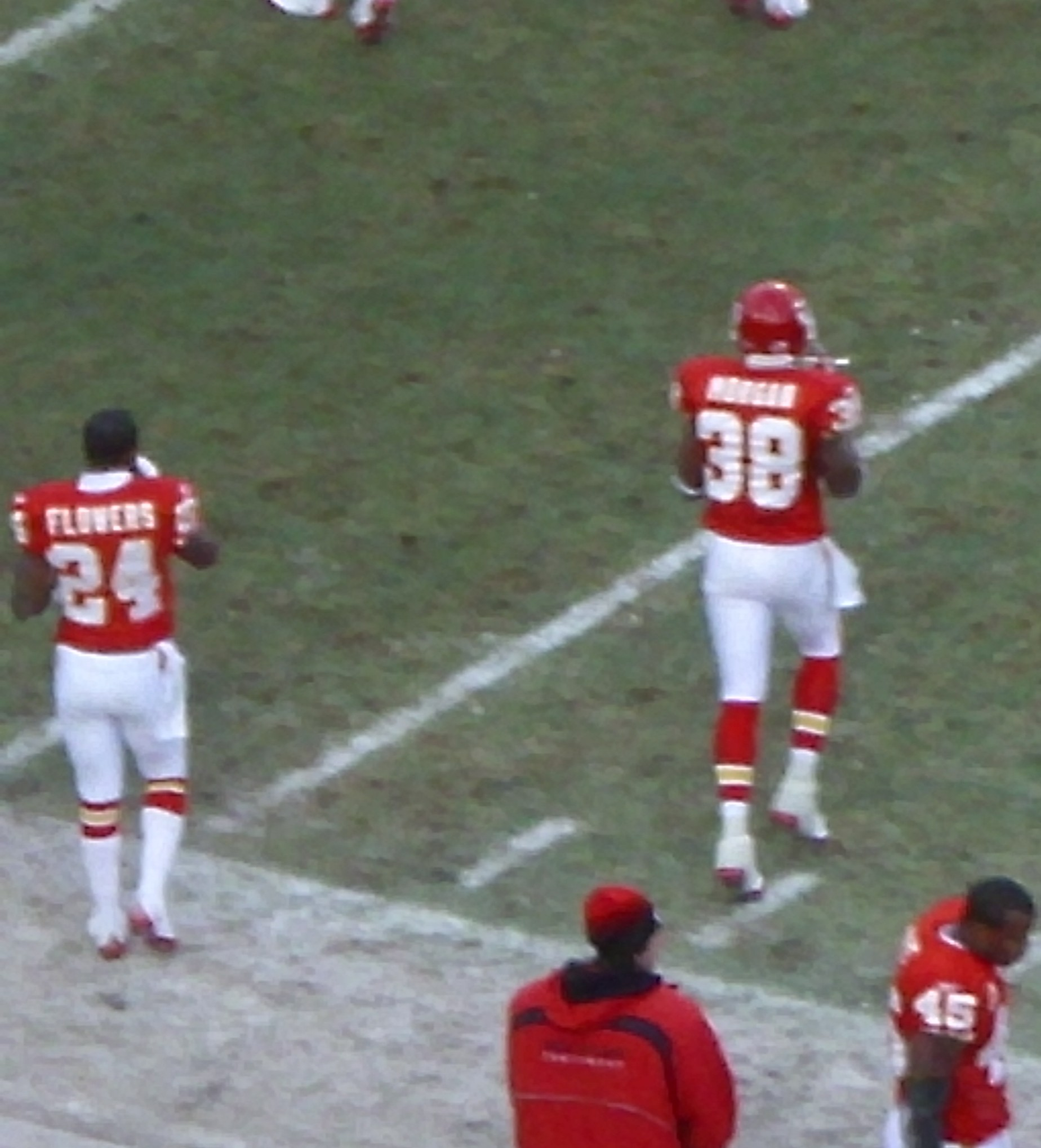
Flowers (left) with the Chiefs

On July 23, 2008, the Kansas City Chiefs signed Flowers to a four–year, $4.72 million rookie contract that included a signing bonus of $1.52 million.

During training camp, he competed to be the No. 2 starting cornerback against fellow rookie Brandon Carr and Tyron Brackenridge following the departure of Ty Law. Head coach Herm Edwards named Flowers and Patrick Surtain the starting cornerbacks to begin the season.

On September 7, 2008, Flowers made his professional regular season debut and earned his first career start in the Kansas City Chiefs' season-opener at the New England Patriots and made six combined tackles (five solo) during a 10–17 loss. On October 26, 2008, Flowers had eight combined tackles (five solo), made two pass deflections, a season-high two interceptions, and scored the first touchdown of his career during a 28–24 loss at the New York Jets. He had his first career interception on a pass by Brett Favre to wide receiver Jerricho Cotchery and returned it for 27–yards during the first quarter. In the fourth quarter he had his first career pick-six after picking off a pass by Brett Favre to wide receiver Chansi Stuckey and returned it 91–yards for a touchdown. He was inactive for two games (Weeks 10–11) due to a thigh injury. On Week 15, he set a season-high with ten solo tackles during a 21–22 loss against the San Diego Chargers. He finished the season with 68 combined tackles (61 solo), 13 pass break-ups, two interceptions, two fumble recoveries, one forced fumble, and a touchdown in 14 games and 13 starts.

==== 2009 ====
He entered training camp slated as the No. 1 starting cornerback under defensive coordinator Clancy Pendergast following the departure of Patrick Surtain. The Chiefs' new head coach Todd Haley named Flowers and Brandon Carr the starting cornerbacks to begin the season.

He was inactive for the Kansas City Chiefs' 24–38 loss at the Baltimore Ravens in Week 1 due to a shoulder injury. In Week 3, Flowers set a season-high with seven combined tackles (six solo) and made one pass deflection during a 14–34 loss against the Philadelphia Eagles. In Week 14, Flowers made six combined tackles (three solo), one pass deflection, and intercepted a pass by Ryan Fitzpatrick to wide receiver Lee Evans during a 10–16 loss to the Buffalo Bills. The following week, he had three solo tackles, one pass deflection, and intercepted a pass thrown by Brady Quinn to wide receiver Mohamed Massaquoi during a 34–41 loss against the Cleveland Browns in Week 15. On January 3, 2010, Flowers made four solo tackles, set a season-high with four pass deflections, and set a career-high with his fifth interception of the season on a pass by Kyle Orton to wide receiver Jabar Gaffney during a 44–24 win at the Denver Broncos. Despite playing nearly all the 2009 season with a hurt shoulder, Flowers finished the season with a total of 65 combined tackles (58 solo), a career-high 23 pass deflections, a career-high five interceptions, made two forced fumbles, and had two fumble recoveries in 15 games and 15 starts.

==== 2010 ====
On January 14, 2010, the Kansas City Chiefs hired Romeo Crennel to be their defensive coordinator after deciding not to re-sign Clancy Pendergast. Head coach Todd Haley retained Flowers and Carr as the starting cornerbacks and named rookie Javier Arenas the starting nickelback.

On September 19, 2010, Flowers made three solo tackles, one pass deflection, and intercepted a pass by Seneca Wallace to wide receiver Chansi Stuckey and returned it 16–14 for a touchdown during a 16–14 victory at the Cleveland Browns. In Week 3, he had two solo tackles, set a season-high with three pass deflections, and intercepted a pass by Alex Smith to wide receiver Michael Crabtree during a 31–10 win against the San Francisco 49ers. In Week 11, he had seven combined tackles (five solo) and made two pass deflections before exiting in the third quarter of a 31–13 win against the Arizona Cardinals due to an injury to his hamstring. He was inactive for the Chiefs' 42–24 win at the Seattle Seahawks in Week 12 due to his hamstring injury. In Week 16, he set a season-high with seven solo tackles as the Chiefs defeated the Tennessee Titans 34–14. He finished the season with 65 combined tackles (56 solo), 14 pass deflections, and two interceptions, and one touchdown in 15 games and 15 starts. During the 2010 season, he helped lead the Chiefs to the 14th ranked defense (in yards per game), after finishing 30th the previous season, and helped lead the Chiefs to their first division title since 2003.

The Kansas City Chiefs finished the 2010 NFL season first in the AFC West with a 10–6 record. On January 9, 2011, Flowers started in his first career playoff game and made three solo tackles and one pass deflection during a 7–30 loss against the Baltimore Ravens in the AFC Wild-Card Game.

==== 2011 ====
On September 16, 2011, the Kansas City Chiefs signed Flowers to a five–year, $49.35 million contract extension that included $22.00 million guaranteed and an initial signing bonus of $10.00 million.

On September 25, 2011, Flowers set a season-high with eight combined tackles (six solo), made one pass deflection, and intercepted a pass by Phillip Rivers to wide receiver Malcom Floyd during a 17–20 loss at the San Diego Chargers. On October 23, 2011, Flowers made three solo tackles, three pass deflections, two interceptions, and returned one for a touchdown during a 28–0 victory at the Oakland Raiders. He intercepted a pass thrown by Carson Palmer to wide receiver Denarius Moore in the fourth quarter and returned it 38–yards for a touchdown. The following week, he recorded five combined tackles (four solo) and set a season-high with four pass deflections as the Chiefs defeated the San Diego Chargers in overtime 23–20 in Week 8. On December 12, 2011, the Chiefs fired head coach Todd Haley after leading his team to a 5–8 record. Defensive coordinator Romeo Crennel was appointed interim head coach for the remainder of the season. He started in all 16 games for the first time in his career and made 59 combined tackles (44 solo), 20 pass deflections, four interceptions, and one touchdown.

==== 2012 ====
Defensive coordinator Romeo Crennel was promoted to head coach entering the 2012 NFL season. He entered training camp slated as the No. 1 starting cornerback, but missed the majority of camp after injuring his foot. He was named the No. 1 starting cornerback to begin the season and was paired with Stanford Routt, following the departure of Brandon Carr who joined the Dallas Cowboys via free agency.

He was inactive due to an injury to the heel of his foot and remained on the sideline for the Kansas City Chiefs' home-opener against the Atlanta Falcons as they lost 24–40. In Week 4, he made three solo tackles, set a season-high with two pass deflections, and intercepted a pass by Phillip Rivers to wide receiver Robert Meachem during a 20–37 loss to the San Diego Chargers. In Week 12, he tied his season-high with four solo tackles, made one pass deflection, and picked off a pass thrown by Peyton Manning to Eric Decker during a 9–17 loss to the Denver Broncos. In Week 16, he recorded four solo tackles, had one pass deflection, and had his first career sack on Andrew Luck for a two–yard loss as the Chiefs lost 13–20 to the Indianapolis Colts. He finished the season with 48 combined tackles (40 solo), 12 pass deflections, three interceptions, one forced fumble, and one sack in 15 games and 15 starts. On December 31, 2012, the Chiefs fired head coach Romeo Crennel after they finished the 2012 NFL season with a 2–14 record.

==== 2013 ====
Throughout training camp, he competed to retain his job as a starting cornerback against Sean Smith and Dunta Robinson under new defensive coordinator Bob Sutton. Head coach Andy Reid named him the No. 1 starting cornerback to begin the season and paired him with Sean Smith with Dunta Robinson and rookie Marcus Cooper serving as backups.

On September 8, 2013, Flowers started in the Kansas City Chiefs' season-opener at the Jacksonville Jaguars and made four solo tackles, set a season-high with two pass deflections, and intercepted a pass by Blaine Gabbert to wide receiver Cecil Shorts during a 28–2 victory. The following week, Flowers set a season-high with ten solo tackles during a 17–16 win against the Dallas Cowboys in Week 2. In Week 3, he made two solo tackles before exiting in the first quarter of a 26–16 win at the Philadelphia Eagles due his sprained knee. He was inactive for the Chiefs' 31–7 win against the New York Giants. He was inactive as the Chiefs defeated the Oakland Raiders 24–7 in Week 5. He finished the 2013 NFL season with a career-high 68 combined tackles (63 solo), eight pass deflections, one interception, and one sack in 13 games and 13 starts.

On June 13, 2014, the Kansas City Chiefs officially released Flowers. The release saved the Chiefs $7.25 million in cap space in 2014 and $7.50 million in 2015. It was reported that Flowers release was, in part, due to his unhappiness with having to play mostly in the slot under new defensive coordinator Bob Sutton. It was also speculated Flowers, standing at 5'9", didn't fit the physical aspects the New Chiefs' General Manager John Dorsey typically favored, as he preferred taller cornerbacks.

=== San Diego Chargers ===
==== 2014 ====
On June 24, 2014, the San Diego Chargers signed Flowers to a one–year, $3.00 million contract that included a signing bonus of $1.50 million. His decision was influenced by the opportunity to play against the Chiefs. Throughout training camp, he competed against Shareece Wright and Jason Verrett to be a starting cornerback under defensive coordinator John Pagano. Head coach Mike McCoy named him the No. 1 starting cornerback and paired him with Shareece Wright to begin the season.

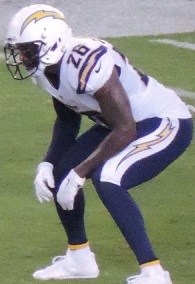
Flowers in 2014

On September 8, 2014, Flowers started in the San Diego Chargers' season-opener at the Arizona Cardinals and set a season-high with seven combined tackles (six solo) during a 17–18 loss. He was inactive for the Chargers' 30–21 victory against the Seattle Seahawks in Week 2 due to a groin injury. On September 28, 2014, Flowers made six solo tackles, one pass deflection, and picked off a pass by Blake Bortles to wide receiver Cecil Shorts during a 33–14 win against the Jacksonville Jaguars. On October 5, 2014, he had one solo tackle, set a season-high with two pass deflections, and intercepted a pass by Geno Smith to wide receiver Greg Salas as the Chargers defeated the New York Jets 31–0. In Week 7, Flowers recorded three combined tackles (one solo) before he exited in the third quarter of a 20–23 loss against his former team, the Kansas City Chiefs, after suffering a concussion in a collision with running back Jamal Charles. He remained inactive for the Chargers' 21–35 loss at the Denver Broncos on Thursday Night Football in Week 8 as he remained in concussion protocol. In Week 12, Flowers had one solo tackle, two pass deflections, and intercepted a pass by Shaun Hill to tight end Jared Cook during a 27–24 victory against the St. Louis Rams. He finished his first season in San Diego recording 52 combined tackles (48 solo), ten pass deflections, three interceptions, in 14 games played.

==== 2015 ====
On March 8, 2015, the San Diego Chargers signed Flowers to a four–year, $36.40 million contract extension that included $20.50 million guaranteed, $18.00 million guaranteed upon signing, and an initial signing bonus of $8.00 million. He announced that he would switch from No. 26 to No. 24 after it became available following the departure of Ryan Mathews. He previously wore No. 24 during his time with the Kansas City Chiefs. He entered training camp slated as the de facto No. 1 starting cornerback. Head coach Mike McCoy named him and Jason Verrett the starting cornerbacks to begin the season with Patrick Robinson as the starting nickelback.

He was inactive for the Chargers' 14–31 loss at the Minnesota Vikings in Week 3 due to a knee injury. In Week 4, Flowers set a season-high with seven combined tackles (six solo) and made two pass deflections during a 30–27 victory against the Cleveland Browns. In Week 13, Flowers recorded one solo tackle before exiting during the first quarter of the Chargers' 3–17 loss against the Denver Broncos due to a knee injury. On December 12, 2015, the Chargers officially placed him on injured reserve due to his knee injury and he remained inactive for the last four games (Weeks 14–17) of the season. He finished the season with 33 combined tackles (29 solo) and only four pass deflections in 11 games and 10 starts.

==== 2016 ====
Throughout training camp, he competed to regain his starting role at cornerback against Jason Verrett and Casey Hayward. Head coach Mike McCoy named him and Jason Verrett the starting cornerbacks to begin the season.

On September 11, 2016, Flowers started in the San Diego Chargers' season-opener at the Kansas City Chiefs and set a season-high with eight solo tackles during a 27–33 overtime loss. On September 25, 2016, he made four combined tackles (three solo) before exiting late in the fourth quarter of a 22–26 loss at the Indianapolis Colts after suffering a concussion in an accidental collision with running back Frank Gore, who was bring tackled by Denzel Perryman. The blow grounded Flowers on the turf for a few seconds and he would subsequently remain inactive for the next four games (Weeks 4–7). In Week 9, Flowers made five solo tackles, set a season-high with three pass deflections, and had a pick-six that marked his last touchdown and interception of his career during a 43–35 victory against the Tennessee Titans. He picked off a pass by Marcus Mariota to wide receiver Kendall Wright in the fourth quarter and returned it 33–yards for a touchdown to help secure the Chargers' victory. On November 13, 2016, Flowers made three combined tackles (two solo) before being carted off the field in the third quarter of a 24–31 loss against the Miami Dolphins. Flowers laid prone on the field after taking an accidental blow to his head when wide receiver Jarvis Landry delivered a block to his back as Flowers attempted to tackle quarterback Ryan Tannehill who was scrambling during a 18–yard touchdown pass. The block from Landry knocked Flowers into Tannehill, making his head collide with Tannehill's hip that would snap Flowers head back. Although the play should have been called back, the Dolphins were instead awarded the touchdown and this would be the last time Flowers would appear in a game as he was carted off the field as players knelt in silence. On December 14, 2016, the Chargers officially placed him on injured reserve.

On March 7, 2017, the Los Angeles Chargers officially released Flowers.

On August 8, 2017, Flowers announced his retirement from the NFL.

"Today, we officially retired Brandon Flowers as a Kansas City Chief!"

Congrats @BFlowers #ChiefsKingdom

— Kansas City Chiefs @Chiefs

On June 9, 2022, the Kansas City Chiefs announced through a post on their official Twitter account that they had signed Flowers to a one-day contract to officially retire as a member of the Chiefs.

== NFL career statistics ==
Year	Team	GP	Tackles				Fumbles			Interceptions					
Year	Team	GP	Cmb	Solo	Ast	Sck	FF	FR	Yds	Int	Yds	Avg	Lng	TD	PD
2008	KC	14	69	62	7	0.0	1	2	37	2	118	59	91	1	13
2009	KC	15	65	58	7	0.0	2	2	0	5	38	8	33	0	23
2010	KC	15	65	56	9	0.0	1	0	0	2	33	17	33	1	14
2011	KC	16	59	47	12	0.0	0	0	0	4	95	24	58	1	20
2012	KC	15	48	40	8	1.0	0	1	64	3	28	9	29	0	13
2013	KC	13	68	63	5	1.0	0	0	0	1	32	32	32	0	8
2014	SD	14	52	48	4	0.0	0	0	0	3	44	15	27	0	10
2015	SD	11	33	29	4	1.0	0	0	0	0	0	0	0	0	4
2016	SD	6	28	24	4	0.0	0	0	0	1	33	33	33	1	5
Career		119	487	427	60	3.0	4	5	101	21	421	20	91	4	110

== Personal life ==
Flowers posed for PETA's anti-fur campaign in December 2014 and became vegan in June 2015.
