= Travis Daniels =

American football player (born 1982)

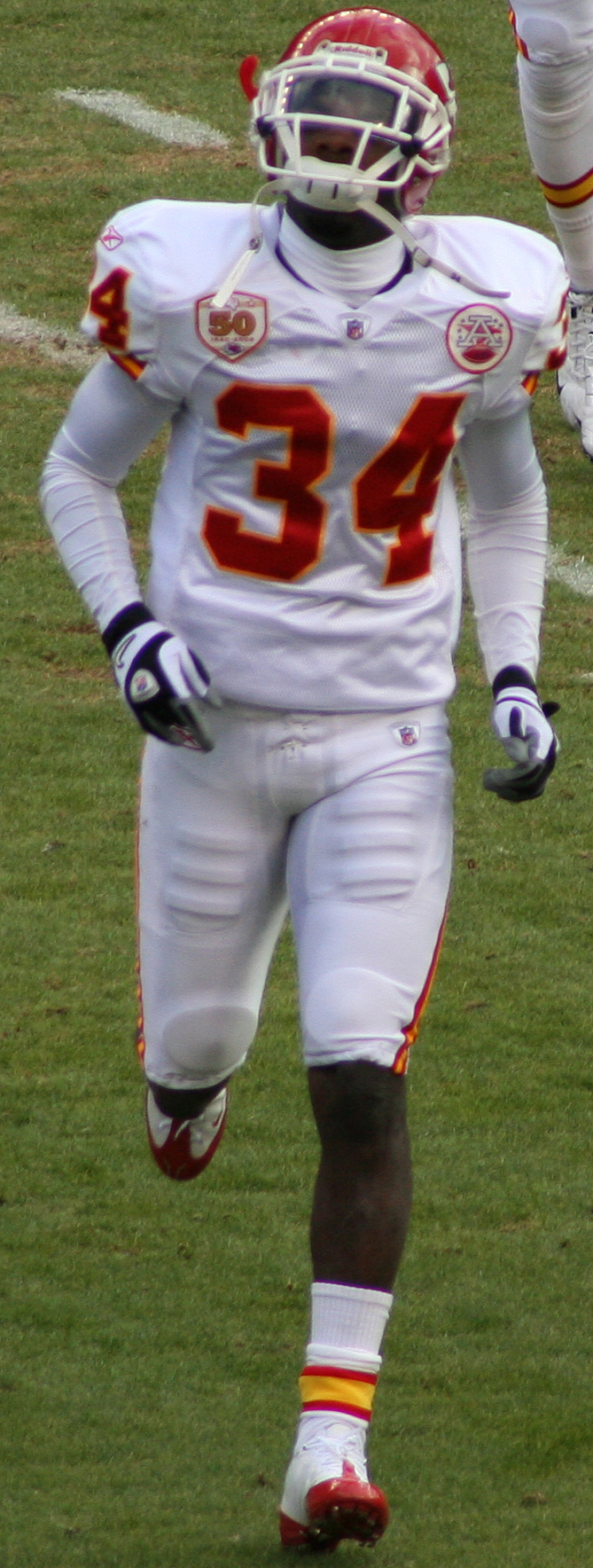
- Daniels with the Kansas City Chiefs in 2010

No. 21, 29, 23, 34
- Position: Cornerback

Personal information
- Born: September 8, 1982 (age 44); Hollywood, Florida, U.S.
- Listed height: 6 ft 1 in (1.85 m)
- Listed weight: 195 lb (88 kg)

Career information
- High school: South Broward (Hollywood)
- College: LSU
- NFL draft: 2005: 4th round, 104th overall pick

Career history
- Miami Dolphins (2005–2007); Cleveland Browns (2008); Kansas City Chiefs (2009–2012)

Awards and highlights
- BCS national champion (2003)

Career NFL statistics
- Total tackles: 191
- Fumble recoveries: 1
- Pass deflections: 29
- Interceptions: 6
- Stats at Pro Football Reference

Travis Antwon Daniels (born September 8, 1982) is an American former professional football player who was a cornerback in the National Football League (NFL). He was selected by the Miami Dolphins in the fourth round of the 2005 NFL draft. He played college football for the LSU Tigers.

Daniels was also a member of the Cleveland Browns and Kansas City Chiefs.

== Early life ==
Daniels attended South Broward High School in South Florida. As a senior, he recorded 60 tackles and five interceptions as a defensive back, while catching 34 passes for 500 yards and four touchdowns as a wide receiver. He returned one kickoff for a touchdown and returned an interception for a score as well. For his performance, he was named First Team 4A All-State, All-District and All-County.

== College career ==
As a freshman at LSU in 2001, Daniels saw his first action of the season against Tennessee in the SEC Championship game. He was forced into action after an injury to Randall Gay. Prior to his appearance, he was going to redshirt his freshman year. When asked about giving up his redshirt, he said, "I play for the name on my helmet, not the name on the back of my jersey." During the game, he broke up two passes including one in the end zone, but did not record any tackles. In a Sugar Bowl win over Illinois, Daniels played but did not accumulate any statistics.

Daniels was a top backup in the Tigers' secondary as a sophomore, seeing most of his time in nickel and dime packages. A hamstring injury shortened his season, but he did appear in five games in 2002. On the year, Daniels recorded three tackles, including one for a loss. He also broke up one pass and had two quarterback hurries.

Daniels stepped into a starting role in 2003, opening all 14 games for the Tigers as a junior. He started the first six games of the season at free safety before moving to cornerback for the final eight contests after the emergence of LaRon Landry. Daniels recorded 58 tackles, including 6.5 for losses, two sacks, three quarterback hurries and two interceptions. He also led the Tigers with 26 pass breakups. His first interception came just before halftime in a win over Mississippi State, which he returned 48 yards for a score. His other interception came against Arizona.

Daniels set a season-high with seven tackles in a September game against Georgia. In the aforementioned game against Mississippi State, Daniels six tackles, a sack and a forced fumble to his interception. In the BCS National Championship win over Oklahoma, he recorded four tackles including one for a two-yard loss.

In 2004, Daniels and fellow senior Corey Webster combined to form one top cornerback tandems in the nation. Daniels started all 12 games for the Tigers, finishing his career with 26 straight starts. Against Iowa in the Capital One Bowl, he tallied seven tackles. Daniels finished the season with 48 tackles and nine pass break-ups. He participated in the Senior Bowl in Mobile, Alabama following the season.

=== College statistics ===
Career defensive statistics
Year	G-GS	UT	AT	TT	TFL	Sacks	INTs
2001 (Fr.)	1–0	0	0	0	0	0	0
2002 (So.)	5–0	3	0	3	1–1	0	0
2003 (Jr.)	14–14	43	15	58	6.5–37	2–22	2–48
2004 (Sr.)	12–12	28	20	48	1–3	0	0
TOTAL	32–26	74	35	109	8.5–41	2–22	2–48

== Professional career ==
=== Pre-draft ===
At LSU's Pro Day in March 2005, Daniels was clocked at 4.57 and 4.55 in the 40-yard dash, had a 37-inch vertical jump, 10-foot-2 long jump, 4.07 short shuttle and 6.86 three-cone drill.

=== Miami Dolphins ===
On April 24, Daniels was selected by the Miami Dolphins in the fourth round (104th overall) of the 2005 NFL draft. At LSU, Daniels was recruited by and played for Nick Saban, who was in his first season as head coach of the Dolphins in 2005. Daniels was one of three SEC players chosen by the Dolphins in 2005. He signed a four-year contract with the Dolphins on July 22. The deal included a $458,000 signing bonus, and also a potential $1.4 million incentive bonus in the final year (2008).

As a rookie in 2005, Daniels appeared in all 16 games for the Dolphins including 14 starts that tied for the team record for a rookie defensive back. Along with Ronnie Brown and Channing Crowder, it marked the first time since 1996 that three or more Dolphins rookies started a minimum of 10 games. Daniels recorded 61 (47 solo) tackles on the year, a figure that ranked fifth on the team and second among defensive backs behind only Lance Schulters' 77. He also added an interception, a fumble recovery and 13 passes defensed. His first career interception came in the opening of the season when he picked off a Jake Plummer pass in the fourth quarter of a 34–10 win over the Denver Broncos. His lone fumble recovery came after linebacker Channing Crowder forced the ball from then-Atlanta Falcons fullback Justin Griffith.

In 2006, an ankle injury caused Daniels to miss the entire preseason as well as the first four games of the regular season. He went on to appear in the team's final 12 contests, starting six. On the year, racked up 36 tackles, an interception and two passes defensed. His lone interception came against the Tennessee Titans on September 24, as he picked off a Kerry Collins pass at the Dolphins’ 31 with less than two minutes remaining in the game to preserve a 13–10 win. Daniels record a season-high eight tackles in the season finale against the Indianapolis Colts.

=== Cleveland Browns ===
On August 20, 2008, the Cleveland Browns acquired Daniels from the Dolphins in exchange for a seventh-round pick in the 2009 NFL draft.

=== Kansas City Chiefs ===
Daniels was signed by the Kansas City Chiefs on March 10, 2009. He was waived on September 4. He was re-signed on November 4. Daniels had another interception add to his career, when he intercepted a Ben Roethlisberger throw during the Chiefs/Steelers game in 2011. Daniels was re-signed to a two-year contract following the 2011 NFL season.

== NFL career statistics ==
Legend
**Bold**	Career high

=== Regular season ===
Year	Team	Games		Tackles					Interceptions					Fumbles			
Year	Team	GP	GS	Cmb	Solo	Ast	Sck	TFL	Int	Yds	TD	Lng	PD	FF	FR	Yds	TD
2005	MIA	**16**	**14**	**62**	**47**	**15**	0.0	**3**	1	4	0	4	**14**	0	**1**	0	0
2006	MIA	12	6	36	25	11	0.0	0	1	−2	0	−2	2	0	0	0	0
2007	MIA	**16**	5	29	20	9	0.0	2	1	**29**	0	**29**	3	0	0	0	0
2008	CLE	7	1	5	4	1	0.0	0	0	0	0	0	0	0	0	0	0
2009	KAN	9	2	21	17	4	0.0	0	0	0	0	0	2	0	0	0	0
2010	KAN	**16**	0	8	6	2	0.0	0	1	4	0	4	4	0	0	0	0
2011	KAN	**16**	0	14	13	1	0.0	0	**2**	25	0	25	3	0	0	0	0
2012	KAN	15	0	16	13	3	0.0	0	0	0	0	0	1	0	0	0	0
		107	28	191	145	46	0.0	5	6	60	0	29	29	0	1	0	0

=== Playoffs ===
Year	Team	Games		Tackles					Interceptions					Fumbles			
Year	Team	GP	GS	Cmb	Solo	Ast	Sck	TFL	Int	Yds	TD	Lng	PD	FF	FR	Yds	TD
2010	KAN	**1**	0	0	0	0	0.0	0	0	0	0	0	0	0	0	0	0
		1	0	0	0	0	0.0	0	0	0	0	0	0	0	0	0	0
