= Gabe Miller =

American football player (born 1987)

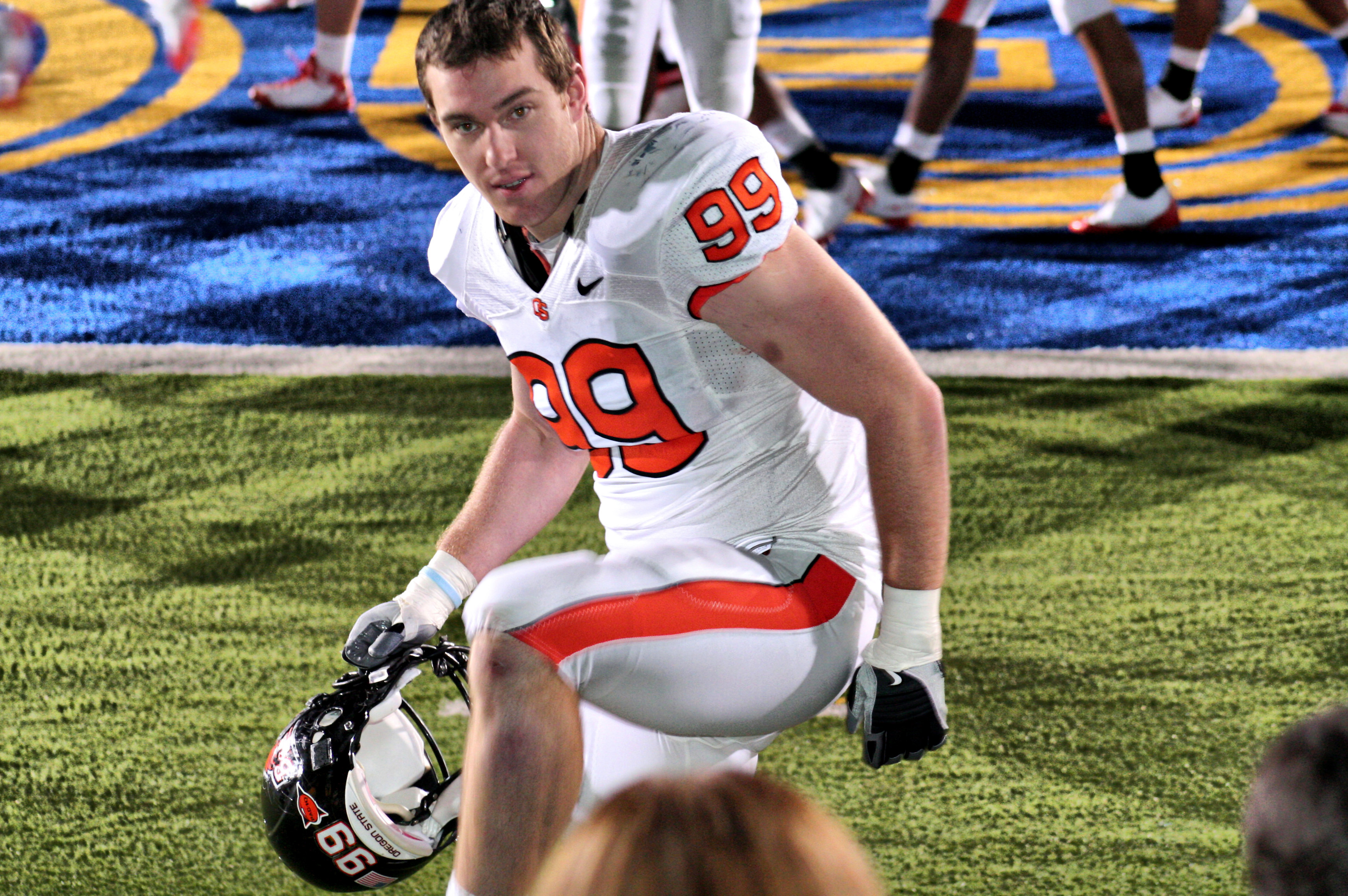
- Miller with the Oregon State Beavers in 2009

No. 50
- Position: Linebacker

Personal information
- Born: December 5, 1987 (age 38); Crested Butte, Colorado, U.S.
- Listed height: 6 ft 3 in (1.91 m)
- Listed weight: 250 lb (113 kg)

Career information
- High school: Lake Oswego (Lake Oswego, Oregon)
- College: Oregon State (2006–2010)
- NFL draft: 2011: 5th round, 140th overall pick

Career history
- Kansas City Chiefs (2011); Seattle Seahawks (2012)*; Chicago Bears (2012−2013)*; Washington Redskins (2013–2014)
- * Offseason or practice squad member only

Career NFL statistics
- Total tackles: 4
- Stats at Pro Football Reference

Gabe Miller (born December 5, 1987) is an American former professional football player who was a linebacker in the National Football League (NFL). He was selected by the Kansas City Chiefs in the fifth round of the 2011 NFL draft. Miller played college football as a defensive end and tight end for the Oregon State Beavers.

He was also a member of the Seattle Seahawks, Chicago Bears, and Washington Redskins.

== Professional career ==
Pre-draft measurables
Height	Weight	40-yard dash	10-yard split	20-yard split	20-yard shuttle	Three-cone drill	Vertical jump	Broad jump	Bench press
6 ft 3 1/4 in (1.91 m)	250 lb (113 kg)	4.62 s	1.56 s	2.65 s	4.12 s	6.97 s	36.0 in (0.91 m)	9 ft 6 in (2.90 m)	33 reps
All values from Pro Day

=== Kansas City Chiefs ===
Miller was selected by the Kansas City Chiefs in the fifth round of the 2011 NFL draft with the 140th overall pick. Having played the defensive end position in college, he was converted to a linebacker.

=== Seattle Seahawks ===
On September 7, 2012, Miller was signed to the practice squad of the Seattle Seahawks, where he moved to the tight end position.

=== Chicago Bears ===
Miller was signed to the Bears practice squad after the departure of Dedrick Epps. On June 4, 2013, Miller was suspended for four games by the league for violating the league's substance policy. He was eventually released by the team on August 25, 2013.

=== Washington Redskins ===
On December 24, 2013, Miller was signed to the practice squad of the Washington Redskins. He signed a reserve/future contract with the team on December 31, 2013. After spending the last two years playing tight end, the Redskins converted him back to the outside linebacker position. On September 27, 2014, he was waived by the Redskins, but re-signed to their practice squad on September 29. He was promoted to the active roster on December 6.

On May 4, 2015, he was waived by the Redskins.
