= Bill Muir =

American football coach (born 1942)

Personal information
- Born: October 26, 1942 (age 84); Pittsburgh, Pennsylvania, U.S.

Career information
- College: Susquehanna

Career history
- Delaware Valley College (1968–1969) Defensive line coach; Rhode Island (1970–1971) Defensive coordinator and defensive line coach; Idaho State (1972–1973) Defensive coordinator; Houston/Shreveport Steamer (1974–1975) Offensive line coach; Southern Methodist (1976–1977) Offensive line coach; Tampa Bay Buccaneers (1978) Scout; Tampa Bay Buccaneers (1979–1981) Pro scout; New England Patriots (1982–1984) Offensive line coach; Detroit Lions (1985–1988) Offensive line coach; Indianapolis Colts (1989–1990) Defensive coordinator; Indianapolis Colts (1991) Offensive line coach; Philadelphia Eagles (1992–1994) Offensive line coach; New York Jets (1995–2001) Offensive line coach; Tampa Bay Buccaneers (2002–2008) Offensive coordinator & offensive line coach; Kansas City Chiefs (2009–2010) Offensive line coach; Kansas City Chiefs (2011) Offensive coordinator & offensive line coach

Awards and highlights
- Super Bowl champion (XXXVII)
- Coaching profile at Pro Football Reference

William Muir (born October 26, 1942) is an American former football coach who served as the offensive coordinator for the Tampa Bay Buccaneers and later as the offensive coordinator and offensive line coach of the Kansas City Chiefs. Muir was fired from the Buccaneers along with five fellow assistant coaches on January 18, 2009. Muir has coached for eight NFL franchises, three different colleges, and two minor league football teams with over 40 years combined coaching experience.

Muir announced his retirement from coaching on February 1, 2012.

Muir graduated attended Susquehanna University, where he was a member of the Lambda Chi Alpha fraternity and graduated in 1965.
