= Luke Patterson =

American football player (born 1987)

No. 68, 77
- Position: Offensive lineman

Personal information
- Born: September 19, 1987 (age 39); Kingsville, Texas, U.S.
- Listed height: 6 ft 4 in (1.93 m)
- Listed weight: 295 lb (134 kg)

Career information
- College: Texas A&M
- NFL draft: 2011: undrafted

Career history
- Kansas City Chiefs (2011−2012)*; New England Patriots (2013)*
- * Offseason or practice squad member only
- Stats at Pro Football Reference

Lucas Patterson (born September 19, 1987) is an American former football offensive lineman in the National Football League (NFL). He was signed by the Kansas City Chiefs as an undrafted free agent in 2011. Patterson was released and re-signed to the practice squad multiple times and had very brief stints on the Chiefs active roster. Patterson also played for the New England Patriots during their 2013 preseason but was released following an injury settlement.
