= Jalil Brown =

American football player and coach (born 1987)

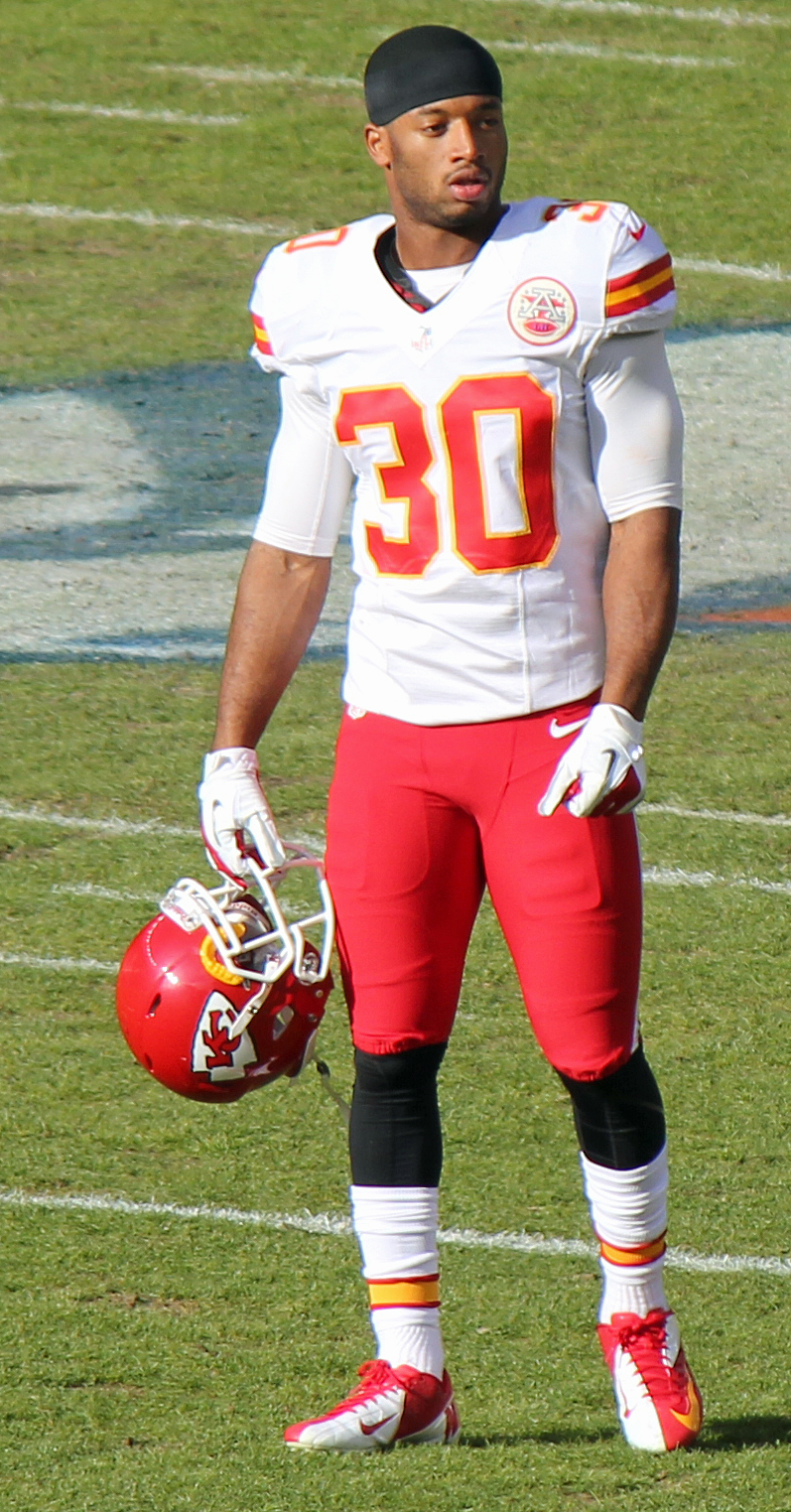
- Brown with the Kansas City Chiefs in 2012

No. 30, 21, 25
- Position: Cornerback

Personal information
- Born: October 14, 1987 (age 39); Phoenix, Arizona, U.S.
- Listed height: 6 ft 1 in (1.85 m)
- Listed weight: 210 lb (95 kg)

Career information
- High school: South Mountain (Phoenix)
- College: Colorado
- NFL draft: 2011: 4th round, 118th overall pick

Career history

Playing
- Kansas City Chiefs (2011–2012); Indianapolis Colts (2013); Miami Dolphins (2013); Indianapolis Colts (2014); Miami Dolphins (2014); Indianapolis Colts (2014–2015)

Coaching
- Boise State (2017) Strength and conditioning coach; Northern Arizona (2018) Cornerbacks coach; Boise State (2019–2020) Cornerbacks coach

Career NFL statistics
- Total tackles: 60
- Forced fumbles: 2
- Pass deflections: 6
- Stats at Pro Football Reference

Jalil Brown (born October 14, 1987) is an American former professional football player who was a cornerback in the National Football League (NFL). He played college football for the Colorado Buffaloes, and was selected by the Kansas City Chiefs in the fourth round of the 2011 NFL draft. Brown was also a member of the Indianapolis Colts and Miami Dolphins.

== College career ==
Brown attended the University of Colorado at Boulder where he finished his career with 167 career tackles, six interceptions, and 21 pass deflections.

After his senior season, he was invited to play in the 2011 Senior Bowl.

== Professional career ==
Pre-draft measurables
Height	Weight	Arm length	Hand span	Wingspan	40-yard dash	10-yard split	20-yard split	20-yard shuttle	Three-cone drill	Vertical jump	Broad jump	Bench press
6 ft 0 5/8 in (1.84 m)	204 lb (93 kg)	30 3/4 in (0.78 m)	9 7/8 in (0.25 m)	6 ft 2 3/4 in (1.90 m)	4.45 s	1.54 s	2.53 s	4.25 s	6.85 s	35.5 in (0.90 m)	9 ft 8 in (2.95 m)	24 reps
All values from NFL Combine/Pro Day

=== Kansas City Chiefs ===
Brown was selected with the 118th overall pick in the 2011 NFL draft by the Kansas City Chiefs. After the season, Brown had 8 tackles. He also has 1 fumble recovery against the New York Jets. Brown`s best game during the season was against the New England Patriots, where he had 3 tackles. The Chiefs waived him in the last round of cuts on September 1, 2013.

=== Indianapolis Colts (first stint) ===
Brown was signed by the Indianapolis Colts on October 22, 2013, after placing Reggie Wayne on injured reserve. After appearing in five games for the Colts, Brown was waived by the Colts on December 14, 2013.

=== Miami Dolphins (first stint) ===
Brown signed with the Miami Dolphins on December 16, 2013. The Dolphins waived Brown on August 22, 2014. and he reverted to the team's injured reserve list after being unclaimed.

=== Indianapolis Colts (second stint) ===
On September 30, 2014, Brown signed with the Indianapolis Colts. He was released on November 4, 2014.

=== Miami Dolphins (second stint) ===
Brown re-signed with the Miami Dolphins on November 15, 2014.

=== Indianapolis Colts (third stint) ===
On November 27, 2014, the Indianapolis Colts waived cornerback Louchiez Purifoy and signed Brown for a third time. Brown was placed on injured reserve on October 7, 2015. Brown was released on October 13, 2015. Brown was re-signed by the Colts on December 8, 2015. On September 4, 2016, he was released by the Colts.

== Coaching career ==
=== Boise State ===
Brown was hired as a strength and conditioning coach for their 2017 season.

=== Northern Arizona ===
On February 21, 2018, Brown was hired as the cornerbacks coach for Northern Arizona.
