= 2010 Kansas City Chiefs season =

NFL team season

- Owner: The Hunt family (Clark Hunt Chairman and CEO)
- General manager: Scott Pioli
- Head coach: Todd Haley
- Offensive coordinator: Charlie Weis
- Defensive coordinator: Romeo Crennel
- Home stadium: Arrowhead Stadium

Results
- Record: 10–6
- Division place: 1st AFC West
- Playoffs: Lost Wild Card Playoffs (vs. Ravens) 7–30
- All-Pros: 2: RB Jamaal Charles (1st team); WR Dwayne Bowe (2nd team)
- Pro Bowlers: 6: QB Matt Cassel; RB Jamaal Charles; WR Dwayne Bowe; G Brian Waters; LB Tamba Hali; S Eric Berry
- Team MVP: Jamaal Charles
- Team ROY: Eric Berry

Uniform
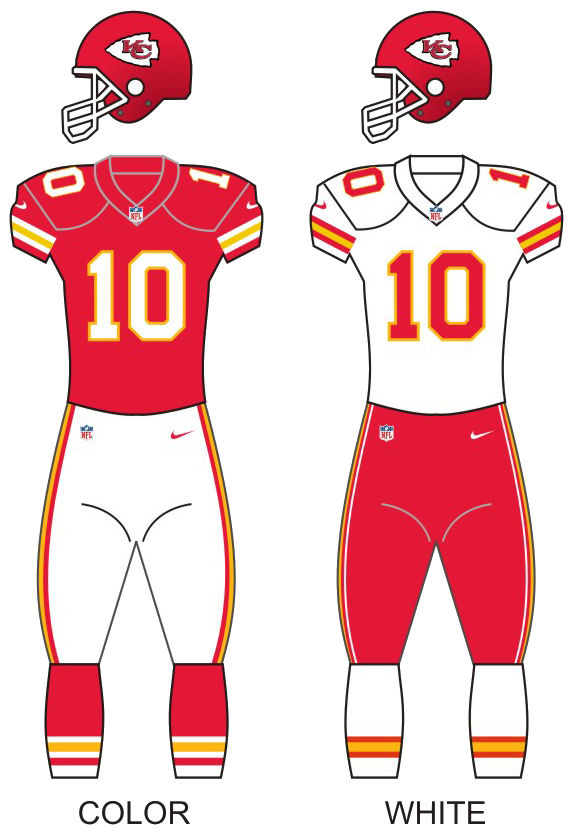

The 2010 season was the Kansas City Chiefs' 41st in the National Football League (NFL), their 51st overall and their second under the head coach/general manager tandem of Todd Haley and Scott Pioli. The team improved on its 4–12 record from 2009, won their first AFC West division title since 2003, and made the playoffs for the first time since 2006. In 2010, the Chiefs moved training camp to Missouri Western State University in St. Joseph, Missouri after spending the previous 19 summers in River Falls, Wisconsin. Until the 2025 Chicago Bears, the 2010 Chiefs were the only NFL team since 2002 to win its division with a losing division record. In addition, the team had one of the easiest schedules since league realignment in 2002, as its strength of schedule was .414 and only three of its 16 opponents had winning records (being the San Diego Chargers twice and Indianapolis Colts, who finished 9–7 and 10–6 respectively).

== Offseason ==
=== Coaching changes ===
The Chiefs added former Notre Dame head coach Charlie Weis as their offensive coordinator, and former Cleveland Browns head coach Romeo Crennel as their defensive coordinator. Both worked in their respective positions while Scott Pioli was the Vice President of Player Personnel with the New England Patriots. They also brought in former Arizona Cardinals coach Richie Anderson to be the team's wide receivers coach, former Notre Dame coach Bernie Parmalee to be the team's tight ends coach, former New England Patriots defensive lineman Anthony Pleasant to be the team's defensive line coach, former Kansas City Chiefs great Emmitt Thomas to be the team's defensive backs coach, Cincinnati Bengals' Defensive coordinator Mike Zimmer's son Adam Zimmer to be the team's assistant linebackers coach, former New York Jets and New England Patriots defensive back Otis Smith to be the team's defensive quality control coach, and well-respected and longtime trainer Mike Clark to be the team's head strength and conditioning coach.

=== Free Agency ===
Kansas City Chiefs Free Agency
Position	Player	Status*	2009 team	2010 team
OG	Andy Alleman	UFA	Kansas City Chiefs	Indianapolis Colts
RB	Jackie Battle	RFA	Kansas City Chiefs	Kansas City Chiefs
S	Mike Brown	UFA	Kansas City Chiefs	TBD
WR	Chris Chambers	UFA	Kansas City Chiefs	Kansas City Chiefs
WR	Terrance Copper	UFA	Kansas City Chiefs	Kansas City Chiefs
FB	Mike Cox	EFA	Kansas City Chiefs	Kansas City Chiefs
QB	Brodie Croyle	RFA	Kansas City Chiefs	Kansas City Chiefs
WR	Devard Darling	UFA	Kansas City Chiefs	TBD
WR	David Grimes	UFA	Denver Broncos	Kansas City Chiefs
LB	Derrick Johnson	RFA	Kansas City Chiefs	Kansas City Chiefs
RB	Thomas Jones	UFA	New York Jets	Kansas City Chiefs
CB	Maurice Leggett	EFA	Kansas City Chiefs	Kansas City Chiefs
OG	Ryan Lilja	UFA	Indianapolis Colts	Kansas City Chiefs
LB	Corey Mays	RFA	Kansas City Chiefs	Kansas City Chiefs
OT	Ikechuku Ndukwe	RFA	Kansas City Chiefs	Kansas City Chiefs
C	Rudy Niswanger	RFA	Kansas City Chiefs	Kansas City Chiefs
OT	Ryan O'Callaghan	RFA	Kansas City Chiefs	Kansas City Chiefs
S	Jarrad Page	RFA	Kansas City Chiefs	Kansas City Chiefs
OT	Barry Richardson	EFA	Kansas City Chiefs	Kansas City Chiefs
TE	Sean Ryan	UFA	Kansas City Chiefs	Washington Redskins
RB	Dantrell Savage	UFA	Kansas City Chiefs	Carolina Panthers
NT	Shaun Smith	UFA	Cincinnati Bengals	Kansas City Chiefs
OG	Wade Smith	UFA	Kansas City Chiefs	Houston Texans
LB	Andy Studebaker	EFA	Kansas City Chiefs	Kansas City Chiefs
WR	Jerheme Urban	RFA	Arizona Cardinals	Kansas City Chiefs
LB	Mike Vrabel	UFA	Kansas City Chiefs	Kansas City Chiefs
WR	Bobby Wade	UFA	Kansas City Chiefs	Washington Redskins
C	Casey Wiegmann	UFA	Denver Broncos	Kansas City Chiefs

*RFA: Restricted free agent, UFA: Unrestricted free agent, ERFA: Exclusive rights free agent, Franchise: Franchise tag

=== Draft ===
The Chiefs had the fifth pick in the draft after finishing the 2009 season 4–12. They had an additional second round pick from the Atlanta Falcons in a trade that sent tight end Tony Gonzalez to the Falcons and two additional fifth round picks, one of them coming from the Carolina Panthers in a trade that sent defensive end Tank Tyler to the Panthers, and the other coming from the Miami Dolphins in exchange for quarterback Tyler Thigpen. The Chiefs traded their sixth round pick to the Dolphins for Guard Andy Alleman and tackle Ikechuku Ndukwe and their seventh round pick to the Dolphins for a sixth round pick in the 2009 NFL draft.

2010 Kansas City Chiefs draft
Round	Selection	Player	Position	College
1	5	Eric Berry	Safety	Tennessee
2	36	Dexter McCluster	Running back	Ole Miss
2	50	Javier Arenas	Cornerback	Alabama
3	68	Jon Asamoah	Guard	Illinois
3	93	Tony Moeaki	Tight end	Iowa
5	136	Kendrick Lewis	Safety	Ole Miss
5	142	Cameron Sheffield	Defensive end	Troy

== Roster ==
2010 Kansas City Chiefs roster
Quarterbacks (QB): 7 Matt Cassel; 12 Brodie Croyle; 4 Tyler Palko; Running backs (RB): 26 Jackie Battle; 46 Tim Castille FB; 25 Jamaal Charles; 42 Mike Cox FB; 20 Thomas Jones; Wide receivers (WR): 82 Dwayne Bowe; 84 Chris Chambers; 10 Terrance Copper; 14 Quinten Lawrence; 22 Dexter McCluster; 15 Verran Tucker; Tight ends (TE): 81 Tony Moeaki; 85 Jake O'Connell; 45 Leonard Pope	Offensive linemen (OL): 76 Branden Albert T; 73 Jon Asamoah G; 65 Ryan Lilja G; 64 Rudy Niswanger C; 75 Ryan O'Callaghan T; 67 Barry Richardson T; 54 Brian Waters G; 62 Casey Wiegmann C; Defensive linemen (DL): 72 Glenn Dorsey DE; 95 Ron Edwards NT; 92 Wallace Gilberry DE; 94 Tyson Jackson DE; 90 Shaun Smith DE; 98 Anthony Toribio NT	Linebackers (LB): 52 Charlie Anderson OLB; 59 Jovan Belcher ILB; 93 Cory Greenwood ILB; 91 Tamba Hali OLB; 56 Derrick Johnson ILB; 51 Corey Mays ILB; 96 Andy Studebaker OLB; 50 Mike Vrabel OLB; 53 Demorrio Williams ILB; Defensive backs (DB): 21 Javier Arenas CB; 29 Eric Berry SS; 39 Brandon Carr CB; 34 Travis Daniels CB; 24 Brandon Flowers CB; 48 Reshard Langford SS; 23 Kendrick Lewis FS; 47 Jon McGraw FS; 35 Ricky Price FS; 27 Donald Washington FS; Special teams (ST): 2 Dustin Colquitt P; 43 Thomas Gafford LS; 6 Ryan Succop K	Practice squad: 57 Justin Cole LB; 70 Dion Gales DE; 74 Bobby Greenwood T; 66 Darryl Harris G; 11 Jeremy Horne WR; 99 Micah Johnson DE; 97 Pierre Walters LB; Reserve: 41 Jackie Bates CB (IR); 87 Brad Cottam TE (PUP); 38 Tervaris Johnson RB (IR); 31 Maurice Leggett CB (IR); 55 Cameron Sheffield OLB (IR); 83 Jerheme Urban WR (IR); 8 Chandler Williams WR (IR); Rookies in italics 53 active, 7 reserve, 7 practice squad

== Staff ==
2010 Kansas City Chiefs staff
Front office: Chairman/CEO – Clark Hunt; General manager – Scott Pioli; Assistant general manager – Joel Collier; Director of pro personnel – Ray Farmer; Director of college scouting – Phil Emery; Director of football administration – Trip MacCracken; Manager of football operations – Mike Borgonzi; Head coaches: Head coach – Todd Haley; Assistant head coach – Maurice Carthon; Offensive coaches: Offensive coordinator – Charlie Weis; Wide receivers – Richie Anderson; Tight ends – Bernie Parmalee; Offensive line – Bill Muir; Assistant offensive line – Pat Perles; Offensive quality control – Nick Sirianni	Defensive coaches: Defensive coordinator – Romeo Crennel; Defensive line – Anthony Pleasant; Linebackers – Gary Gibbs; Defensive backs – Emmitt Thomas; Defensive assistant/assistant linebackers – Adam Zimmer; Defensive quality control – Otis Smith; Pass rush – Joe Kim; Special teams coaches: Special teams – Steve Hoffman; Strength and conditioning: Strength and conditioning – Mike Clark; Assistant strength and conditioning – Brent Salazar

== Preseason ==
=== Schedule ===
Week	Date	Opponent	Result	Record	Venue	Recap
1	August 13	at Atlanta Falcons	L 10–20	0–1	Georgia Dome	Recap
2	August 21	at Tampa Bay Buccaneers	L 15–20	0–2	Raymond James Stadium	Recap
3	August 27	Philadelphia Eagles	L 17–20	0–3	Arrowhead Stadium	Recap
4	September 2	Green Bay Packers	W 17–13	1–3	Arrowhead Stadium	Recap

=== Game summaries ===
==== Week 1: at Atlanta Falcons ====
Week 1: Kansas City Chiefs at Atlanta Falcons – Game summary

Quarter	1	2	3	4	Total
Chiefs	0	3	0	7	10
Falcons	3	0	7	10	20

at Georgia Dome, Atlanta, Georgia

- Date: August 13
- Game time: 8:00 p.m. EDT/7:00 p.m. CDT
- Game weather: None (indoor stadium)
- Game attendance: 65,726
- Referee: Jerome Boger
- Recap, Game Book

Game information

First quarter

- ATL – Matt Bryant 30-yard field goal, 8:26. Falcons 3–0. Drive: 10 plays, 55 yards, 6:34.

Second quarter

- KC – Ryan Succop 20-yard field goal, 0:00. Tied 3–3. Drive: 17 plays, 78 yards, 3:43.

Third quarter

- ATL – Dimitri Nance 2-yard run (Stephen Hauschka kick), 11:37. Falcons 10–3. Drive: 5 plays, 14 yards, 2:27.

Fourth quarter

- ATL – Dimitri Nance 1-yard run (Matt Bryant kick), 14:23. Falcons 17–3. Drive: 19 plays, 81 yards, 10:00.
- ATL – Stephen Hauschka 37-yard field goal, 11:23. Falcons 20–3. Drive: 7 plays, –10 yards, 1:41.
- KC – Tyler Palko 1-yard run (Ryan Succop kick), 0:18. Falcons 20–10. Drive: 15 plays, 84 yards, 5:27.

Top passers

- KC – Tyler Palko – 8/13, 66 yards, INT
- ATL – John Parker Wilson – 8/17, 80 yards

Top rushers

- KC – Javarris Williams – 7 rushes, 38 yards
- ATL – Antone Smith – 12 rushes, 36 yards

Top receivers

- KC – Dexter McCluster – 3 receptions, 23 yards
- ATL – Tony Gonzalez – 2 receptions, 28 yards

==== Week 2: at Tampa Bay Buccaneers ====
Week 2: Kansas City Chiefs at Tampa Bay Buccaneers – Game summary

Quarter	1	2	3	4	Total
Chiefs	7	3	3	2	15
Buccaneers	3	7	0	10	20

at Raymond James Stadium, Tampa, Florida

- Date: August 21
- Game time: 7:30 p.m. EDT/6:30 p.m. CDT
- Game weather: Cloudy, 86 °F (30 °C)
- Game attendance: 41,386
- Referee: Walt Coleman
- Recap, Game Book

Game information

First quarter

- TB – Connor Barth 31-yard field goal, 11:02. Buccaneers 3–0. Drive: 7 plays, 28 yards, 3:09.
- KC – Jeremy Horne 6-yard pass from Matt Cassel (Ryan Succop kick), 6:39. Chiefs 7–3. Drive: 8 plays, 47 yards, 4:23.

Second quarter

- TB – Micheal Spurlock 53-yard pass from Josh Johnson (Connor Barth kick), 9:35. Buccaneers 10–7. Drive: 6 plays, 88 yards, 3:17.
- KC – Ryan Succop 28-yard field goal, 0:00. Tied 10–10. Drive: 14 plays, 77 yards, 4:45.

Third quarter

- KC – Ryan Succop 29-yard field goal, 1:02. Chiefs 13–10. Drive: 13 plays, 76 yards, 6:35.

Fourth quarter

- TB – Connor Barth 36-yard field goal, 9:42. Tied 13–13. Drive: 5 plays, 23 yards, 1:32.
- TB – Terrence Nunn 5-yard pass from Rudy Carpenter (Connor Barth kick), 6:15. Buccaneers 20–13. Drive: 4 plays, 50 yards, 1:48.
- KC – Brent Bowden OB in end zone for a Safety, 0:59. Buccaneers 20–15.

Top passers

- KC – Matt Cassel – 14/19, 125 yards, TD
- TB – Josh Johnson – 6/10, 113 yards, TD

Top rushers

- KC – Jackie Battle – 11 rushes, 59 yards
- TB – Kareem Huggins – 8 rushes, 44 yards

Top receivers

- KC – Cody Slate – 3 receptions, 37 yards
- TB – Micheal Spurlock – 3 receptions, 75 yards, TD

==== Week 3: vs. Philadelphia Eagles ====
Week 3: Philadelphia Eagles at Kansas City Chiefs – Game summary

Quarter	1	2	3	4	Total
Eagles	10	0	0	10	20
Chiefs	0	7	7	3	17

at Arrowhead Stadium, Kansas City, Missouri

- Date: August 27
- Game time: 7:00 p.m. CDT
- Game weather: Clear, 83 °F (28 °C)
- Game attendance: 64,809
- Referee: Bill Leavy
- Recap, Game Book

Game information

First quarter

- PHI – LeSean McCoy 18-yard run (David Akers kick), 14:03. Eagles 7–0. Drive: 2 plays, 22 yards, 0:45.
- PHI – David Akers 39-yard field goal, 1:46. Eagles 10–0. Drive: 16 plays, 47 yards, 7:44.

Second quarter

- KC – Dwayne Bowe 4-yard pass from Matt Cassel (Ryan Succop kick), 3:01. Eagles 10–7. Drive: 16 plays, 63 yards, 7:24.

Third quarter

- KC – Thomas Jones 11-yard run (Ryan Succop kick), 4:42. Chiefs 14–10. Drive: 4 plays, 26 yards, 1:46.

Fourth quarter

- PHI – David Akers 27-yard field goal, 14:50. Chiefs 14–13. Drive: 10 plays, 71 yards, 4:52.
- KC – Ryan Succop 43-yard field goal, 2:04. Chiefs 17–13. Drive: 8 plays, 47 yards, 2:45.
- PHI – Riley Cooper 18-yard pass from Mike Kafka (David Akers kick), 0:23. Eagles 20–17. Drive: 8 plays, 80 yards, 1:41.

Top passers

- PHI – Kevin Kolb – 11/25, 103 yards, INT
- KC – Matt Cassel – 14/23, 85 yards, TD, INT

Top rushers

- PHI – LeSean McCoy – 6 rushes, 32 yards
- KC – Jackie Battle – 10 rushes, 49 yards

Top receivers

- PHI – Jeremy Maclin – 3 receptions, 39 yards
- KC – Lance Long – 1 reception, 39 yards

==== Week 4: vs. Green Bay Packers ====
Week 4: Green Bay Packers at Kansas City Chiefs – Game summary

Quarter	1	2	3	4	Total
Packers	0	3	7	3	13
Chiefs	7	7	3	0	17

at Arrowhead Stadium, Kansas City, Missouri

- Date: September 2
- Game time: 7:00 p.m. CDT
- Game weather: Cloudy, 67 °F (19 °C)
- Game attendance: 63,843
- Referee: Ed Hochuli
- Recap, Game Book

Game information

First quarter

- KC – Leonard Pope 2-yard pass from Matt Cassel (Ryan Succop kick), 2:46. Chiefs 7–0. Drive: 10 plays, 62 yards, 4:28.

Second quarter

- KC – Jackie Battle 1-yard run (Ryan Succop kick), 3:46. Chiefs 14–0. Drive: 8 plays, 95 yards, 4:32.
- GB – Mason Crosby 40-yard field goal, 0:16. Chiefs 14–3. Drive: 10 plays, 60 yards, 3:30.

Third quarter

- GB – Kregg Lumpkin 1-yard run (Mason Crosby kick), 10:52. Chiefs 14–10. Drive: 4 plays, 82 yards, 1:13.
- KC – Ryan Succop 26-yard field goal, 1:32. Chiefs 17–10. Drive: 10 plays, 73 yards, 4:20.

Fourth quarter

- GB – Mason Crosby 41-yard field goal, 6:12. Chiefs 17–13. Drive: 11 plays, 41 yards, 4:51.

Top passers

- GB – Matt Flynn – 23/37, 304 yards
- KC – Brodie Croyle – 11/16, 119 yards

Top rushers

- GB – Kregg Lumpkin – 11 rushes, 36 yards, TD
- KC – Jackie Battle – 10 rushes, 67 yards, TD

Top receivers

- GB – Brett Swain – 6 receptions, 130 yards
- KC – Tim Castille – 1 reception, 43 yards

== Regular season ==
=== Schedule ===
Week	Date	Opponent	Result	Record	Venue	Recap
1	September 13	**San Diego Chargers**	**W** 21–14	1–0	Arrowhead Stadium	Recap
2	September 19	at Cleveland Browns	**W** 16–14	2–0	Cleveland Browns Stadium	Recap
3	September 26	San Francisco 49ers	**W** 31–10	3–0	Arrowhead Stadium	Recap
4	Bye					
5	October 10	at Indianapolis Colts	**L** 9–19	3–1	Lucas Oil Stadium	Recap
6	October 17	at Houston Texans	**L** 31–35	3–2	Reliant Stadium	Recap
7	October 24	Jacksonville Jaguars	**W** 42–20	4–2	Arrowhead Stadium	Recap
8	October 31	Buffalo Bills	**W** 13–10 (OT)	5–2	Arrowhead Stadium	Recap
9	November 7	at **Oakland Raiders**	**L** 20–23 (OT)	5–3	Oakland–Alameda County Coliseum	Recap
10	November 14	at **Denver Broncos**	**L** 29–49	5–4	Invesco Field at Mile High	Recap
11	November 21	Arizona Cardinals	**W** 31–13	6–4	Arrowhead Stadium	Recap
12	November 28	at Seattle Seahawks	**W** 42–24	7–4	Qwest Field	Recap
13	December 5	**Denver Broncos**	**W** 10–6	8–4	Arrowhead Stadium	Recap
14	December 12	at **San Diego Chargers**	**L** 0–31	8–5	Qualcomm Stadium	Recap
15	December 19	at St. Louis Rams	**W** 27–13	9–5	Edward Jones Dome	Recap
16	December 26	Tennessee Titans	**W** 34–14	10–5	Arrowhead Stadium	Recap
17	January 2	**Oakland Raiders**	**L** 10–31	10–6	Arrowhead Stadium	Recap

Note: Intra-division opponents are in bold text.

=== Game summaries ===
==== Week 1: vs. San Diego Chargers ====
Week 1: San Diego Chargers at Kansas City Chiefs – Game summary

Quarter	1	2	3	4	Total
Chargers	7	0	7	0	**14**
**Chiefs**	7	14	0	0	**21**

at Arrowhead Stadium, Kansas City, Missouri

- Date: September 13
- Game time: 9:15 p.m. CDT
- Game weather: Clear, 78 °F (26 °C)
- Game attendance: 71,297
- Referee: Pete Morelli
- TV announcers (ESPN): Brad Nessler, Trent Dilfer and Suzy Kolber
- Recap, Game Book

Game information

**First quarter**

- SD – Antonio Gates 3-yard pass from Philip Rivers (Nate Kaeding kick), 1:52. Chargers 7–0. **Drive: 9 plays, 60 yards, 4:45.**
- KC – Jamaal Charles 56-yard run (Ryan Succop kick), 0:37. Tied 7–7. **Drive: 3 plays, 69 yards, 1:15.**

**Second quarter**

- KC – Tony Moeaki 2-yard pass from Matt Cassell (Ryan Succop kick), 5:55. Chiefs 14–7. **Drive: 3 plays, 12 yards, 1:26.**
- KC – Dexter McCluster 94-yard punt return (Ryan Succop kick), 1:43. Chiefs 21–7.

**Third quarter**

- SD – Legedu Naanee 59-yard pass from Philip Rivers (Nate Kaeding kick), 2:23. Chiefs 21–14. **Drive: 5 plays, 91 yards, 2:51.**

**Fourth quarter**

- No scoring plays.

**Top passers**

- SD – Philip Rivers – 22/39, 298 yards, 2 TD
- KC – Matt Cassel – 10/22, 68 yards, TD

**Top rushers**

- SD – Ryan Mathews – 20 rushes, 78 yards
- KC – Jamaal Charles – 11 rushes, 92 yards, TD

**Top receivers**

- SD – Legedu Naanee – 5 receptions, 110 yards, TD
- KC – Tony Moeaki – 3 receptions, 21 yards, TD

The Chiefs began their season at home for a division rivalry match against the San Diego Chargers. In the first quarter the Chiefs trailed early as QB Philip Rivers completed a 3-yard TD pass to TE Antonio Gates. The Chiefs replied when RB Jamaal Charles made a 56-yard TD run. In the 2nd quarter the Chiefs took the lead with QB Matt Cassel completing a 2-yard TD pass to TE Tony Moeaki. This was followed by WR Dexter McCluster returning a punt 94 yards to the endzone for a touchdown. In the third quarter the Chargers cut the lead when QB Philip Rivers threw a 59-yard TD pass to WR Legedu Naanee. In the 4th quarter the Chiefs defense prevented any more scoring giving themselves a win.

With the win, the Chiefs began at 1–0.

==== Week 2: at Cleveland Browns ====
Week 2: Kansas City Chiefs at Cleveland Browns – Game summary

Quarter	1	2	3	4	Total
**Chiefs**	3	7	3	3	**16**
Browns	0	14	0	0	**14**

at Cleveland Browns Stadium, Cleveland, Ohio

- Date: September 19
- Game time: 1:00 p.m. EDT/12:00 p.m. CDT
- Game weather: Cloudy, 65 °F (18 °C)
- Game attendance: 65,377
- Referee: Carl Cheffers
- TV announcers (CBS): Don Criqui and Steve Beuerlein
- Recap, Game Book

Game information

**First quarter**

- KC – Ryan Succop 35-yard field goal, 8:43. Chiefs 3–0. **Drive: 4 plays, 6 yards, 0:36.**

**Second quarter**

- CLE – Peyton Hillis 1-yard run (Phil Dawson kick), 12:31. Browns 7–3. **Drive: 10 plays, 98 yards, 5:06.**
- KC – Brandon Flowers 33-yard interception return (Ryan Succop kick), 10:02. Chiefs 10–7.
- CLE – Joshua Cribbs 65-yard pass from Seneca Wallace (Phil Dawson kick), 8:43. Browns 14–10. **Drive: 3 plays, 74 yards, 1:19.**

**Third quarter**

- KC – Ryan Succop 26-yard field goal, 8:45. Browns 14–13. **Drive: 11 plays, 63 yards, 6:15.**

**Fourth quarter**

- KC – Ryan Succop 23-yard field goal, 7:41. Chiefs 16–14. **Drive: 14 plays, 68 yards, 6:31.**

**Top passers**

- KC – Matt Cassel – 16/28, 176 yards, 2 INT
- CLE – Seneca Wallace – 16/31, 229 yards, TD, INT

**Top rushers**

- KC – Thomas Jones – 22 rushes, 83 yards
- CLE – Peyton Hillis – 8 rushes, 35 yards, TD

**Top receivers**

- KC – Tony Moeaki – 5 receptions, 58 yards
- CLE – Joshua Cribbs – 3 receptions, 74 yards, TD

Hoping to increase their winning streak the Chiefs flew to Cleveland Browns Stadium for an AFC duel with the Browns. In the first quarter the Chiefs took the early lead when kicker Ryan Succop nailed a 35-yard field goal. The Chiefs fell behind in the 2nd quarter when RB Peyton Hillis completed a 1-yard TD run, but got back in the game when CB Brandon Flowers returned an interception 33 yards to the endzone for a touchdown. The Chiefs trailed again as QB Seneca Wallace made a 65-yard TD pass to WR Josh Cribbs. The Chiefs cut the lead in the 3rd quarter when Ryan Succop made a 26-yard field goal and then a 23-yard field goal in the fourth quarter, giving Kansas City the win.

With the win, the Chiefs improved to 2–0.

==== Week 3: vs. San Francisco 49ers ====
Week 3: San Francisco 49ers at Kansas City Chiefs – Game summary

Quarter	1	2	3	4	Total
49ers	0	3	0	7	**10**
**Chiefs**	0	10	14	7	**31**

at Arrowhead Stadium, Kansas City, Missouri

- Date: September 26
- Game time: 12:00 p.m. CDT
- Game weather: Sunny, 55 °F (13 °C)
- Game attendance: 68,188
- Referee: Clete Blakeman
- TV announcers (Fox): Sam Rosen, Tim Ryan and Chris Myers
- Recap, Game Book

Game information

**First quarter**

- No scoring plays.

**Second quarter**

- KC – Dexter McCluster 31-yard pass from Matt Cassel (Ryan Succop kick), 10:52. Chiefs 7–0. **Drive: 1 play, 31 yards, 0:10.**
- SF – Joe Nedney 51-yard field goal, 7:30. Chiefs 7–3. **Drive: 8 plays, 45 yards, 3:22.**
- KC – Ryan Succop 32-yard field goal, 0:00. Chiefs 10–3. **Drive: 7 plays, 44 yards, 1:05.**

**Third quarter**

- KC – Dwayne Bowe 45-yard pass from Matt Cassel (Ryan Succop kick), 9:21. Chiefs 17–3. **Drive: 2 plays, 45 yards, 0:16.**
- KC – Tony Moeaki 18-yard pass from Matt Cassel (Ryan Succop kick), 1:35. Chiefs 24–3. **Drive: 8 plays, 61 yards, 5:05.**

**Fourth quarter**

- KC – Thomas Jones 3-yard run (Ryan Succop kick), 3:27. Chiefs 31–3. **Drive: 7 plays, 57 yards, 4:26.**
- SF – Josh Morgan 12-yard pass from Alex Smith (Joe Nedney kick), 0:00. Chiefs 31–10. **Drive: 7 plays, 71 yards, 1:23.**

**Top passers**

- SF – Alex Smith – 23/42, 232 yards, TD, INT
- KC – Matt Cassel – 16/27, 250 yards, 3 TD, INT

**Top rushers**

- SF – Frank Gore – 15 rushes, 43 yards
- KC – Jamaal Charles – 12 rushes, 97 yards

**Top receivers**

- SF – Frank Gore – 9 receptions, 102 yards
- KC – Dexter McCluster – 3 receptions, 69 yards, TD

Hoping to increase their winning streak the Chiefs played at home ground for an interconference duel with the 49ers. In the 2nd quarter, the Chiefs scored first when QB Matt Cassel made a 31-yard TD pass to WR Dexter McCluster. The lead was narrowed when kicker Joe Nedney hit a 51-yard field goal. But the Chiefs started to rally with kicker Ryan Succop getting a 32-yard field goal, followed by Cassel making a 45-yard TD pass to WR Dwayne Bowe. Then Cassel made an 18-yard TD pass to TE Tony Moeaki. This was followed in the 4th quarter by RB Thomas Jones making a 3-yard TD run. After that, the Niners replied with QB Alex Smith making a 12-yard TD pass to WR Josh Morgan.

With the win, not only did Kansas City enter its bye week at 3–0, but it also marked their first 3–0 start since 2003. With losses by both the Chicago Bears and the Pittsburgh Steelers the following week, the Kansas City Chiefs are left as the last undefeated team.

==== Week 5: at Indianapolis Colts ====
Week 5: Kansas City Chiefs at Indianapolis Colts – Game summary

Quarter	1	2	3	4	Total
Chiefs	0	3	6	0	**9**
**Colts**	3	3	3	10	**19**

at Lucas Oil Stadium; Indianapolis, Indiana

- Date: October 10
- Game time: 1:00 p.m. EDT/12:00 p.m. CDT
- Game weather: None (retractable roof closed)
- Game attendance: 66,869
- Referee: Terry McAulay
- TV announcers (CBS): Spero Dedes and Dan Dierdorf
- Recap, Game Book

Game information

**First quarter**

- IND – Adam Vinatieri 20-yard field goal, 10:04. Colts 3–0. **Drive: 9 plays, 35 yards, 4:56.**

**Second quarter**

- IND – Adam Vinatieri 24-yard field goal, 9:14. Colts 6–0. **Drive: 16 plays, 86 yards, 7:50.**
- KC – Ryan Succop 45-yard field goal, 0:02. Colts 6–3. **Drive: 3 plays, 34 yards, 0:16.**

**Third quarter**

- IND – Adam Vinatieri 47-yard field goal, 8:31. Colts 9–3. **Drive: 10 plays, 51 yards, 4:10.**
- KC – Ryan Succop 35-yard field goal, 4:35. Colts 9–6. **Drive: 8 plays, 55 yards, 3:56.**
- KC – Ryan Succop 43-yard field goal, 3:26. Colts 9–9. **Drive: 4 plays, 5 yards, 0:18.**

**Fourth quarter**

- IND – Adam Vinatieri 42-yard field goal, 14:40. Colts 12–9. **Drive: 12 plays, 60 yards, 3:46.**
- IND – Mike Hart 11-yard run (Adam Vinatieri kick), 4:02. Colts 19–9. **Drive: 12 plays, 71 yards, 5:33.**

**Top passers**

- KC – Matt Cassel – 16/29, 156 yards
- IND – Peyton Manning – 26/44, 244 yards, INT

**Top rushers**

- KC – Jamaal Charles – 18 carries, 87 yards
- IND – Joseph Addai – 17 carries, 50 yards

**Top receivers**

- KC – Tony Moeaki – 4 receptions, 50 yards
- IND – Reggie Wayne – 6 receptions, 75 yards

Coming out of their bye week the Chiefs flew to Lucas Oil Stadium for an AFC duel with the Colts. In the first quarter the Chiefs trailed early as kicker Adam Vinatieri made a 20-yard field goal, followed by a 24-yard field goal in the second quarter. The Chiefs replied with kicker Ryan Succop nailing a 45-yard field goal. In the third quarter the Colts increased their lead with Vinatieri's 47-yard field goal, followed by Succop's 35 and 43-yard field goals to tie the game. In the fourth quarter the Chiefs trailed slightly with Vinatieri getting a 42-yard field goal. After that, the Chiefs defense was finally broken down with RB Mike Hart getting an 11-yard TD run.

With the loss, the Chiefs fell to 3–1 and it also marked the first time since 1970 where no teams start out 4–0.

==== Week 6: at Houston Texans ====
Week 6: Kansas City Chiefs at Houston Texans – Game summary

Quarter	1	2	3	4	Total
Chiefs	7	7	10	7	**31**
**Texans**	0	7	7	21	**35**

at Reliant Stadium, Houston, Texas

- Date: October 17
- Game time: 12:00 p.m. CDT
- Game weather: Partly cloudy, 78 °F (26 °C) (retractable roof open)
- Game attendance: 70,926
- Referee: Ron Winter
- TV announcers (CBS): Gus Johnson and Steve Tasker
- Recap, Game Book

Game information

**First quarter**

- KC – Mike Vrabel 2-yard pass from Matt Cassel (Ryan Succop kick), 6:23. Chiefs 7–0. **Drive: 15 plays, 74 yards, 8:37.**

**Second quarter**

- HOU – Joel Dreessen 5-yard pass from Matt Schaub (Neil Rackers kick), 6:45. Tied 7–7. **Drive: 9 plays, 74 yards, 4:37.**
- KC – Dwayne Bowe 17-yard pass from Matt Cassel (Ryan Succop kick), 0:13. Chiefs 14–7. **Drive: 7 plays, 63 yards, 2:00.**

**Third quarter**

- KC – Dwayne Bowe 42-yard pass from Matt Cassel (Ryan Succop kick), 8:19. Chiefs 21–7. **Drive: 9 plays, 77 yards, 4:53.**
- HOU – Derrick Ward 38-yard run (Neil Rackers kick), 7:02. Chiefs 21–14. **Drive: 3 plays, 66 yards, 1:17.**
- KC – Ryan Succop 24-yard field goal, 2:58. Chiefs 24–14. **Drive: 9 plays, 65 yards, 4:04.**

**Fourth quarter**

- HOU – Arian Foster 2-yard run (Neil Rackers kick), 12:06. Chiefs 24–21. **Drive: 11 plays, 46 yards, 5:52.**
- KC – Thomas Jones 11-yard run (Ryan Succop kick), 7:05. Chiefs 31–21. **Drive: 9 plays, 70 yards, 5:01.**
- HOU – Arian Foster 1-yard run (Neil Rackers kick), 3:30. Chiefs 31–28. **Drive: 8 plays, 86 yards, 3:35.**
- HOU – Andre Johnson 11-yard pass from Matt Schaub (Neil Rackers kick), 0:28. Texans 35–31. **Drive: 9 plays, 80 yards, 1:54.**

**Top passers**

- KC – Matt Cassel – 20/29, 201 yards, 3 TD
- HOU – Matt Schaub – 25/33, 305 yards, 2 TD

**Top rushers**

- KC – Thomas Jones – 19 rushes, 100 yards, TD
- HOU – Arian Foster – 18 rushes, 71 yards, 2 TD

**Top receivers**

- KC – Dwayne Bowe – 6 receptions, 108 yards, 2 TD
- HOU – Andre Johnson – 8 receptions, 138 yards, TD

Hoping to rebound from their loss to the Colts The Chiefs flew to Reliant Stadium for an AFC duel against the Texans. In the first quarter the Chiefs took the early lead with QB Matt Cassel getting a 2-yard TD pass to OLB Mike Vrabel. The Texans responded and tied the game with QB Matt Schaub making a 5-yard TD pass to TE Joel Dreessen. The Chiefs rallied with Cassel making a 17 and a 42-yard TD pass to WR Dwayne Bowe in the 3rd quarter. The Texans replied with RB Derrick Ward getting a 38-yard TD run. Then kicker Ryan Succop made a 24-yard field goal to put the Chiefs up 24–14. In the fourth quarter the Texans closed the gap with RB Arian Foster making a 2-yard TD run, but the Chiefs tried to pull away with RB Thomas Jones getting an 11-yard TD run. However, the Texans replied and eventually snatched the win with Foster making a 1-yard TD run, and then with Schaub finding WR Andre Johnson on an 11-yard TD pass.

With the loss, the Chiefs fell to 3–2.

==== Week 7: vs. Jacksonville Jaguars ====
Week 7: Jacksonville Jaguars at Kansas City Chiefs – Game summary

Quarter	1	2	3	4	Total
Jaguars	3	10	7	0	**20**
**Chiefs**	7	7	14	14	**42**

at Arrowhead Stadium, Kansas City, Missouri

- Date: October 24
- Game time: 12:00 p.m. CDT
- Game weather: Partly cloudy, 63 °F (17 °C)
- Game attendance: 69,105
- Referee: Jerome Boger
- TV announcers (CBS): Bill Macatee and Rich Gannon
- Recap, Game Book

Game information

**First quarter**

- KC – Jamaal Charles 4-yard run (Ryan Succop kick), 5:51. Chiefs 7–0. **Drive: 2 plays, 74 yards, 0:35.**
- JAX – Josh Scobee 35-yard field goal, 1:13. Chiefs 7–3. **Drive: 9 plays, 50 yards, 4:38.**

**Second quarter**

- JAX – Maurice Jones-Drew 18-yard pass from Todd Bouman (Josh Scobee kick), 9:38. Jaguars 10–7. **Drive: 8 plays, 71 yards, 4:33.**
- KC – Thomas Jones 1-yard run (Ryan Succop kick), 1:31. Chiefs 14–10. **Drive: 14 plays, 73 yards, 8:07.**
- JAX – Josh Scobee 18-yard field goal, 0:07. Chiefs 14–13. **Drive: 10 plays, 69 yards, 1:24.**

**Third quarter**

- KC – Dwayne Bowe 53-yard pass from Matt Cassel (Ryan Succop kick), 14:23. Chiefs 21–13. **Drive: 2 plays, 60 yards, 0:37.**
- JAX – Mike Sims-Walker 9-yard pass from Todd Bouman (Josh Scobee kick), 10:36. Chiefs 21–20. **Drive: 6 plays, 58 yards, 3:47.**
- KC – Derrick Johnson 15-yard interception return (Ryan Succop kick), 5:13. Chiefs 28–20.

**Fourth quarter**

- KC – Dwayne Bowe 6-yard pass from Matt Cassel (Ryan Succop kick), 3:46. Chiefs 35–20. **Drive: 10 plays, 85 yards, 5:51.**
- KC – Jackie Battle 1-yard run (Ryan Succop kick), 1:56. Chiefs 42–20. **Drive: 3 plays, 12 yards, 1:12.**

**Top passers**

- JAX – Todd Bouman – 18/43, 222 yards, 2 TD, 2 INT
- KC – Matt Cassel – 13/18, 193 yards, 2 TD

**Top rushers**

- JAX – Maurice Jones-Drew – 16 rushes, 47 yards
- KC – Thomas Jones – 20 rushes, 125 yards, TD

**Top receivers**

- JAX – Maurice Jones-Drew – 5 receptions, 74 yards, TD
- KC – Dexter McCluster – 5 receptions, 41 yards

Hoping to break their losing streak the Chiefs played on home ground for an AFC duel against the Jaguars. In the first quarter the Chiefs took the lead as RB Jamaal Charles got a 4-yard TD run. But the Jaguars replied with kicker Josh Scobee nailing a 35-yard field goal. The Jaguars took the lead in the second quarter with QB Todd Bouman making an 18-yard TD pass to RB Maurice Jones-Drew. The lead didn't last long after RB Thomas Jones got a 1-yard TD run, but the Chiefs' lead was soon narrowed after Scobee hit an 18-yard field goal. The Chiefs scored in the third quarter with QB Matt Cassel completing a 53-yard TD pass to WR Dwayne Bowe. The Jaguars tried to come back with Bouman finding Mike Sims-Walker on a 9-yard TD pass, but the Chiefs pulled away as ILB Derrick Johnson returned an interception 15 yards for a touchdown, followed by Cassel getting a 6-yard TD pass to Bowe, and with RB Jackie Battle making a 1-yard TD run.

With the win, the Chiefs improved to 4–2.

==== Week 8: vs. Buffalo Bills ====
Week 8: Buffalo Bills at Kansas City Chiefs – Game summary

Quarter	1	2	3	4	OT	Total
Bills	0	0	3	7	0	**10**
**Chiefs**	0	7	0	3	3	**13**

at Arrowhead Stadium, Kansas City, Missouri

- Date: October 31
- Game time: 12:00 p.m. CDT
- Game weather: Partly sunny, 51 °F (11 °C)
- Game attendance: 66,625
- Referee: Alberto Riveron
- TV announcers (CBS): Gus Johnson and Steve Tasker
- Recap, Game Book

Game information

**First quarter**

- No scoring plays.

**Second quarter**

- KC – Dwayne Bowe 1-yard pass from Matt Cassel (Ryan Succop kick), 1:28. Chiefs 7–0. **Drive: 6 plays, 71 yards, 2:26.**

**Third quarter**

- BUF – Rian Lindell 43-yard field goal, 6:03. Chiefs 7–3. **Drive: 15 plays, 56 yards, 8:57.**

**Fourth quarter**

- KC – Ryan Succop 28-yard field goal, 9:36. Chiefs 10–3. **Drive: 12 plays, 59 yards, 7:02.**
- BUF – Stevie Johnson 4-yard pass from Ryan Fitzpatrick (Rian Lindell kick), 2:18. Tied 10–10. **Drive: 15 plays, 83 yards, 7:18.**

**Overtime**

- KC – Ryan Succop 35-yard field goal, 0:00. Chiefs 13–10. **Drive: 8 plays, 53 yards, 1:13.**

**Top passers**

- BUF – Ryan Fitzpatrick – 24/48, 223 yards, TD, INT
- KC – Matt Cassel – 14/26, 152 yards, TD

**Top rushers**

- BUF – Fred Jackson – 20 rushes, 64 yards
- KC – Jamaal Charles – 22 rushes, 177 yards

**Top receivers**

- BUF – Roscoe Parrish – 4 receptions, 66 yards
- KC – Jamaal Charles – 4 receptions, 61 yards

Coming off their win over the Jaguars the Chiefs played on home ground for an AFC duel with the Bills. Late in the second quarter the Chiefs took the lead as QB Matt Cassel got a 1-yard TD pass to WR Dwayne Bowe. The lead was cut in the third quarter with kicker Rian Lindell making a 43-yard field goal. The Chiefs scored with kicker Ryan Succop getting a 28-yard field goal. The Bills responded and tied the game with Ryan Fitzpatrick throwing a 4-yard TD pass to WR Stevie Johnson. The game nearly ended in a tie as Chiefs kicker Ryan Succop made the game winning 35-yard field goal with 5 seconds left in overtime.

With the win, the Chiefs improved to 5–2.

==== Week 9: at Oakland Raiders ====
Week 9: Kansas City Chiefs at Oakland Raiders – Game summary

Quarter	1	2	3	4	OT	Total
Chiefs	0	10	3	7	0	**20**
**Raiders**	0	0	14	6	3	**23**

at Oakland–Alameda County Coliseum, Oakland, California

- Date: November 7
- Game time: 3:15 p.m. CST/1:15 p.m. PST
- Game weather: Overcast, 62 °F (17 °C)
- Game attendance: 61,075
- Referee: Jeff Triplette
- TV announcers (CBS): Kevin Harlan and Solomon Wilcots
- Recap, Game Book

Game information

**First quarter**

- No scoring plays.

**Second quarter**

- KC – Verran Tucker 11-yard pass from Matt Cassel (Ryan Succop kick), 14:31. Chiefs 7–0. **Drive: 5 plays, 47 yards, 1:45.**
- KC – Ryan Succop 43-yard field goal, 11:08. Chiefs 10–0. **Drive: 4 plays, 1 yards, 2:05.**

**Third quarter**

- OAK – Jacoby Ford 94-yard kickoff return (Sebastian Janikowski kick), 14:48. Chiefs 10–7.
- KC – Ryan Succop 25-yard field goal, 9:41. Chiefs 13–7. **Drive: 8 plays, 56 yards, 3:26.**
- OAK – Khalif Barnes 2-yard pass from Jason Campbell (Sebastian Janikowski kick), 6:13. Raiders 14–13. **Drive: 7 plays, 74 yards, 3:28.**

**Fourth quarter**

- OAK – Sebastian Janikowski 23-yard field goal, 9:46. Raiders 17–13. **Drive: 12 plays, 75 yards, 4:56.**
- KC – Dwayne Bowe 20-yard pass from Matt Cassel (Ryan Succop kick), 6:13. Chiefs 20–17. **Drive: 5 plays, 30 yards, 2:39.**
- OAK – Sebastian Janikowski 41-yard field goal, 0:03. Tied 20–20. **Drive: 10 plays, 53 yards, 2:03.**

**Overtime**

- OAK – Sebastian Janikowski 33-yard field goal, 12:07. Raiders 23–20. **Drive: 3 plays, 47 yards, 1:32.**

**Top passers**

- KC – Matt Cassel – 20/35, 216 yards, 2 TD, INT
- OAK – Jason Campbell – 19/33, 229 yards, TD, INT

**Top rushers**

- KC – Jamaal Charles – 10 rushes, 53 yards
- OAK – Darren McFadden – 17 rushes, 89 yards

**Top receivers**

- KC – Dwayne Bowe – 5 receptions, 63 yards, TD
- OAK – Jacoby Ford – 6 receptions, 148 yards

Coming off their win over the Bills the Chiefs flew to Oakland–Alameda County Coliseum for an AFC West division rivalry match against the Raiders. In the 2nd quarter the Chiefs took the lead as QB Matt Cassel made an 11-yard TD pass to WR Verran Tucker; followed by kicker Ryan Succop nailing a 43-yard field goal. In the 3rd quarter the lead was narrowed as WR Jacoby Ford returned a kickoff 94 yards for a touchdown. the Chiefs responded with Succop hitting a 25-yard field goal, but the Raiders replied with QB Jason Campbell throwing a 2-yard TD pass to Khalif Barnes, and with kicker Sebastian Janikowski making a 23-yard field goal. The Chiefs got the lead back after Cassel found WR Dwayne Bowe on a 20-yard TD pass, but the lead didn't last very long after Janikowski got a 41-yard field goal. The decision was made to go to overtime when Janikowski successfully hit a 33-yard field goal to give the Chiefs a loss.

With the loss, the Chiefs fell to 5–3.

==== Week 10: at Denver Broncos ====
Week 10: Kansas City Chiefs at Denver Broncos – Game summary

Quarter	1	2	3	4	Total
Chiefs	0	10	7	12	**29**
**Broncos**	21	14	7	7	**49**

at INVESCO Field at Mile High, Denver, Colorado

- Date: November 14
- Game time: 3:05 p.m. CST/2:05 p.m. MDT
- Game weather: Partly cloudy, 43 °F (6 °C)
- Game attendance: 75,334
- Referee: Mike Carey
- TV announcers (CBS): Kevin Harlan and Solomon Wilcots
- Recap, Game Book

Game information

**First quarter**

- DEN – Knowshon Moreno 17-yard pass from Kyle Orton (Matt Prater kick), 12:02. Broncos 7–0. **Drive: 8 plays, 80 yards, 2:58.**
- DEN – Brandon Lloyd 6-yard pass from Kyle Orton (Matt Prater kick), 4:19. Broncos 14–0. **Drive: 9 plays, 82 yards, 4:37.**
- DEN – Jabar Gaffney 40-yard pass from Kyle Orton (Matt Prater kick), 1:19. Broncos 21–0. **Drive: 3 plays, 53 yards, 1:15.**

**Second quarter**

- DEN – Tim Tebow 1-yard run (Matt Prater kick), 10:07. Broncos 28–0. **Drive: 8 plays, 58 yards, 3:10.**
- DEN – Jason Hunter 75-yard fumble return (Matt Prater kick), 5:48. Broncos 35–0.
- KC – Jamaal Charles 5-yard pass from Matt Cassel (Ryan Succop kick), 1:28. Broncos 35–7. **Drive: 9 plays, 83 yards, 4:20.**
- KC – Ryan Succop 40-yard field goal, 0:00. Broncos 35–10. **Drive: 1 play, 0 yards, 0:01.**

**Third quarter**

- DEN – Spencer Larsen 3-yard pass from Tim Tebow (Matt Prater kick), 9:24. Broncos 42–10. **Drive: 10 plays, 60 yards, 4:45.**
- KC – Dwayne Bowe 15-yard pass from Matt Cassel (Ryan Succop kick), 2:22. Broncos 42–17. **Drive: 4 plays, 38 yards, 1:22.**

**Fourth quarter**

- DEN – Brandon Lloyd 15-yard pass from Kyle Orton (Matt Prater kick), 11:47. Broncos 49–17. **Drive: 10 plays, 66 yards, 5:35.**
- KC – Chris Chambers 11-yard pass from Matt Cassel (pass failed), 6:54. Broncos 49–23. **Drive: 15 plays, 83 yards, 4:53.**
- KC – Dwayne Bowe 22-yard pass from Matt Cassel (pass failed), 0:10. Broncos 49–29. **Drive: 6 plays, 69 yards, 1:45.**

**Top passers**

- KC – Matt Cassel – 33/53, 469 yards, 4 TD
- DEN – Kyle Orton – 22/34, 296 yards, 4 TD

**Top rushers**

- KC – Jamaal Charles – 14 rushes, 41 yards
- DEN – Knowshon Moreno – 22 rushes, 106 yards

**Top receivers**

- KC – Dwayne Bowe – 13 rushes, 186 yards, 2 TD
- DEN – Brandon Lloyd – 6 receptions, 90 yards, 2 TD

Hoping to rebound from their loss to the Raiders the Chiefs flew to INVESCO Field at Mile High for a division rivalry match against the Broncos. In the first quarter the Chiefs immediately struggled with QB Kyle Orton making 17, 8 and 40-yard TD passes to WR Knowshon Moreno, WR Brandon Lloyd and WR Jabar Gaffney respectively. This was followed by Tim Tebow getting a 1-yard TD run, and with OLB Jason Hunter recovering a fumble and running 75 yards for a touchdown. The Chiefs tried to come back when QB Matt Cassel made a 5-yard TD pass to RB Jamaal Charles, followed by kicker Ryan Succop hitting a 40-yard field goal. The Chiefs struggled further as Tebow got a 3-yard TD pass to FB Spencer Larsen. They answered with Cassel's 15-yard TD pass to Bowe. The Broncos continued to score in the 4th quarter with Orton making a 15-yard TD pass to Lloyd. The Chiefs tried narrow the lead with Cassel making an 11 and a 22-yard TD pass to WR Chris Chambers and Dwayne Bowe respectively (With failed 2-point conversions for each), but the defense prevented their chances.

With the loss, the Chiefs fell to 5–4.

==== Week 11: vs. Arizona Cardinals ====
Week 11: Arizona Cardinals at Kansas City Chiefs – Game summary

Quarter	1	2	3	4	Total
Cardinals	3	0	3	7	**13**
**Chiefs**	0	14	7	10	**31**

at Arrowhead Stadium, Kansas City, Missouri

- Date: November 21
- Game time: 12:00 p.m. CST
- Game weather: Cloudy, 66 °F (19 °C)
- Game attendance: 66,247
- Referee: Walt Coleman
- TV announcers (Fox): Ron Pitts and John Lynch
- Recap, Game Book

Game information

**First quarter**

- ARI – Jay Feely 36-yard field goal, 10:24. Cardinals 3–0. **Drive: 9 plays, 51 yards, 4:36.**

**Second quarter**

- KC – Dwayne Bowe 1-yard pass from Matt Cassel (Ryan Succop kick), 13:35. Chiefs 7–3. **Drive: 4 plays, 38 yards, 1:58.**
- KC – Thomas Jones 1-yard run (Ryan Succop kick), 10:14. Chiefs 14–3. **Drive: 5 plays, 68 yards, 2:12.**

**Third quarter**

- KC – Thomas Jones 3-yard run (Ryan Succop kick), 9:59. Chiefs 21–3. **Drive: 9 plays, 80 yards, 5:01.**
- ARI – Jay Feely 29-yard field goal, 4:55. Chiefs 21–6. **Drive: 10 plays, 69 yards, 5:04.**

**Fourth quarter**

- KC – Ryan Succop 23-yard field goal, 8:12. Chiefs 24–6. **Drive: 10 plays, 57 yards, 5:23.**
- KC – Dwayne Bowe 38-yard pass from Matt Cassel (Ryan Succop kick), 4:20. Chiefs 31–6. **Drive: 3 plays, 42 yards, 1:19.**
- ARI – Larry Fitzgerald 3-yard pass from Derek Anderson (Jay Feely kick), 0:00. Chiefs 31–13. **Drive: 14 plays, 83 yards, 4:20.**

**Top passers**

- ARI – Derek Anderson – 25/46, 295 yards, TD
- KC – Matt Cassel – 15/24, 193 yards, 2 TD

**Top rushers**

- ARI – Tim Hightower – 12 rushes, 62 yards
- KC – Jamaal Charles – 12 rushes, 88 yards

**Top receivers**

- ARI – Steve Breaston – 5 receptions, 92 yards
- KC – Dwayne Bowe – 6 receptions, 109 yards, 2 TD

Hoping to break their two-game losing streak the Chiefs played on home ground for an inter-conference duel with the Cardinals. The Chiefs trailed early with kicker Jay Feely hitting a 36-yard field goal, but they took the lead with QB Matt Cassel completing a 1-yard TD pass to WR Dwayne Bowe. This was followed by RB Thomas Jones getting a 1 and a 3-yard TD run. The Cardinals responded with Feely making a 29-yard field goal, but the Chiefs increased their lead with kicker Ryan Succop getting a 23-yard field goal, followed by Cassel throwing a 38-yard TD pass to Bowe. The lead was narrowed when QB Derek Anderson got a 3-yard TD pass to WR Larry Fitzgerald.

With the win, the Chiefs improved to 6–4.

==== Week 12: at Seattle Seahawks ====
Week 12: Kansas City Chiefs at Seattle Seahawks – Game summary

Quarter	1	2	3	4	Total
**Chiefs**	7	14	0	21	**42**
Seahawks	7	3	7	7	**24**

at Qwest Field, Seattle, Washington

- Date: November 28
- Game time: 3:05 p.m. CST/1:05 p.m. PST
- Game weather: Sunny, 43 °F (6 °C)
- Game attendance: 66,370
- Referee: Tony Corrente
- TV announcers (CBS): Bill Macatee and Rich Gannon
- Recap, Game Book

Game information

**First quarter**

- KC – Dwayne Bowe 7-yard pass from Matt Cassel (Ryan Succop kick), 11:31. Chiefs 7–0. **Drive: 7 plays, 72 yards, 3:29.**
- SEA – Earl Thomas 10-yard return of blocked punt (Olindo Mare kick), 0:31. Tied 7–7.

**Second quarter**

- KC – Shaun Smith 1-yard run (Ryan Succop kick), 7:18. Chiefs 14–7. **Drive: 15 plays, 74 yards, 8:13.**
- KC – Dwayne Bowe 36-yard pass from Matt Cassel (Ryan Succop kick), 1:12. Chiefs 21–7. **Drive: 6 plays, 80 yards, 2:38.**
- SEA – Olindo Mare 43-yard field goal, 0:00. Chiefs 21–10. **Drive: 6 plays, 18 yards, 0:28.**

**Third quarter**

- SEA – Chris Baker 13-yard pass from Matt Hasselbeck (Olindo Mare kick), 14:03. Chiefs 21–17. **Drive: 2 plays, 71 yards, 0:57.**

**Fourth quarter**

- KC – Jamaal Charles 3-yard run (Ryan Succop kick), 14:54. Chiefs 28–17. **Drive: 11 plays, 71 yards, 6:06.**
- KC – Dwayne Bowe 9-yard pass from Matt Cassel (Ryan Succop kick), 12:43. Chiefs 35–17. **Drive: 3 plays, 22 yards, 1:10.**
- SEA – Ben Obomanu 87-yard pass from Matt Hasselbeck (Olindo Mare kick), 10:16. Chiefs 35–24. **Drive: 1 play, 87 yards, 0:13.**
- KC – Tony Moeaki 6-yard pass from Matt Cassel (Ryan Succop kick), 3:36. Chiefs 42–24. **Drive: 10 plays, 80 yards, 6:40.**

**Top passers**

- KC – Matt Cassel – 22/32, 233 yards, 4 TD
- SEA – Matt Hasselbeck – 20/37, 282 yards, 2 TD, 2 INT

**Top rushers**

- KC – Jamaal Charles – 22 rushes, 173 yards, TD
- SEA – Marshawn Lynch – 7 rushes, 20 yards

**Top receivers**

- KC – Dwayne Bowe – 13 receptions, 170 yards, 3 TD
- SEA – Ben Obomanu – 5 receptions, 159 yards, TD

Coming off their win over the Cardinals the Chiefs flew to Qwest Field where they played their old division rival, the Seattle Seahawks. In the first quarter, the Chiefs took the lead with QB Matt Cassel getting a 7-yard TD pass to WR Dwayne Bowe. They had a problem maintaining this lead as Dustin Colquitt's punt was blocked and returned 10 yards for a touchdown by FS Earl Thomas. They soon got the lead back as Shaun Smith got a 1-yard TD run, followed by Cassel finding Bowe again on a 36-yard TD pass. The lead was narrowed when kicker Olindo Mare got a 43-yard field goal, followed by QB Matt Hasselbeck getting a 13-yard TD pass to TE Chris Baker. The Chiefs pulled ahead with RB Jamaal Charles getting a 3-yard TD run, followed by Cassel throwing to Bowe on a 9-yard TD pass. The Seahawks responded as Hasselbeck completed an 87-yard TD pass to WR Ben Obomanu, but the Chiefs increased their lead as Cassel got a 6-yard TD pass to TE Tony Moeaki.

With the win, the Chiefs improved to 7–4.

==== Week 13: vs. Denver Broncos ====
Week 13: Denver Broncos at Kansas City Chiefs – Game summary

Quarter	1	2	3	4	Total
Broncos	0	3	0	3	**6**
**Chiefs**	7	3	0	0	**10**

at Arrowhead Stadium, Kansas City, Missouri

- Date: December 5
- Game time: 12:00 p.m. CST
- Game weather: Sunny, 26 °F (−3 °C)
- Game attendance: 67,267
- Referee: Carl Cheffers
- TV announcers (CBS): Ian Eagle and Rich Gannon
- Recap, Game Book

Game information

**First quarter**

- KC – Leonard Pope 2-yard pass from Matt Cassel (Ryan Succop kick), 1:15. Chiefs 7–0. **Drive: 11 plays, 70 yards, 6:29.**

**Second quarter**

- DEN – Matt Prater 25-yard field goal, 1:19. Chiefs 7–3. **Drive: 12 plays, 85 yards, 5:20.**
- KC – Ryan Succop 47-yard field goal, 0:03. Chiefs 10–3. **Drive: 8 plays, 44 yards, 1:16.**

**Third quarter**

- No scoring plays.

**Fourth quarter**

- DEN – Matt Prater 41-yard field goal, 13:42. Chiefs 10–6. **Drive: 8 plays, 44 yards, 2:42.**

**Top passers**

- DEN – Kyle Orton – 9/28, 117 yards
- KC – Matt Cassel – 17/31, 196 yards, TD

**Top rushers**

- DEN – Knowshon Moreno – 23 rushes, 161 yards
- KC – Jamaal Charles – 21 rushes, 116 yards

**Top receivers**

- DEN – Brandon Lloyd – 2 receptions, 31 yards
- KC – Thomas Jones – 4 receptions, 54 yards

Coming off their win over the Seahawks the Chiefs played on home ground for an AFC West rivalry rematch against the Broncos. The Chiefs took the early lead as QB Matt Cassel got a 2-yard TD pass to TE Leonard Pope. The Broncos replied with kicker Matt Prater getting a 25-yard field goal, but the Chiefs increased their lead with kicker Ryan Succop nailing a 47-yard field goal. The lead was narrowed when Prater nailed a 41-yard field goal.

With the win, the Chiefs improved to 8–4.

==== Week 14: at San Diego Chargers ====
Week 14: Kansas City Chiefs at San Diego Chargers – Game summary

Quarter	1	2	3	4	Total
Chiefs	0	0	0	0	**0**
**Chargers**	7	14	0	10	**31**

at Qualcomm Stadium, San Diego, California

- Date: December 12
- Game time: 3:15 p.m. CST/1:15 p.m. PST
- Game weather: Sunny, 86 °F (30 °C)
- Game attendance: 66,780
- Referee: Walt Anderson
- TV announcers (CBS): Gus Johnson and Steve Tasker
- Recap, Game Book

Game information

**First quarter**

- SD – Malcom Floyd 17-yard pass from Philip Rivers (Nate Kaeding kick), 5:33. Chargers 7–0. **Drive: 10 plays, 67 yards, 6:10.**

**Second quarter**

- SD – Mike Tolbert 8-yard run (Nate Kaeding kick), 6:47. Chargers 14–0. **Drive: 9 plays, 69 yards, 5:04.**
- SD – Malcom Floyd 9-yard pass from Philip Rivers (Nate Kaeding kick), 0:40. Chargers 21–0. **Drive: 9 plays, 81 yards, 2:58.**

**Third quarter**

- No scoring plays.

**Fourth quarter**

- SD – Nate Kaeding 48-yard field goal, 8:25. Chargers 24–0. **Drive: 10 plays, 42 yards, 5:38.**
- SD – Ryan Mathews 15-yard run (Nate Kaeding kick), 3:15. Chargers 31–0. **Drive: 6 plays, 36 yards, 3:47.**

**Top passers**

- KC – Brodie Croyle – 7/17, 40 yards
- SD – Philip Rivers – 18/24, 226 yards, 2 TD, INT

**Top rushers**

- KC – Jamaal Charles – 10 rushes, 40 yards
- SD – Mike Tolbert – 16 rushes, 66 yards, TD

**Top receivers**

- KC – Terrance Copper – 2 receptions, 15 yards
- SD – Malcom Floyd – 4 receptions, 51 yards, 2 TD

Hoping to make it 4-straight the Chiefs flew to Qualcomm Stadium for a division rivalry rematch against the Chargers. The Chiefs trailed with QB Philip Rivers throwing a 17-yard TD pass to WR Malcolm Floyd, followed by FB Mike Tolbert getting an 8-yard TD run. The lead was increased with Rivers finding Floyd again on a 9-yard TD pass. This was followed in the fourth quarter by kicker Nate Kaeding nailing a 48-yard field goal, and then by RB Ryan Mathews getting a 15-yard TD run.

With the loss, the Chiefs fell to 8–5.

==== Week 15: at St. Louis Rams ====
Week 15: Kansas City Chiefs at St. Louis Rams – Game summary

Quarter	1	2	3	4	Total
**Chiefs**	0	14	3	10	**27**
Rams	6	0	0	7	**13**

at Edward Jones Dome, St. Louis, Missouri

- Date: December 19
- Game time: 12:00 p.m. CST
- Game weather: None (indoor stadium)
- Game attendance: 55,669
- Referee: Ron Winter
- TV announcers (CBS): Ian Eagle and Dan Fouts
- Recap, Game Book

Game information

**First quarter**

- STL – Josh Brown 37-yard field goal, 6:56. Rams 3–0. **Drive: 14 plays, 53 yards, 8:04.**
- STL – Josh Brown 52-yard field goal, 4:43. Rams 6–0. **Drive: 4 plays, 2 yards, 1:28.**

**Second quarter**

- KC – Leonard Pope 2-yard pass from Matt Cassel (Ryan Succop kick), 6:49. Chiefs 7–6. **Drive: 9 plays, 61 yards, 4:01.**
- KC – Jamaal Charles 2-yard run (Ryan Succop kick), 1:47. Chiefs 14–6. **Drive: 9 plays, 59 yards, 4:00.**

**Third quarter**

- KC – Ryan Succop 53-yard field goal, 10:18. Chiefs 17–6. **Drive: 12 plays, 48 yards, 4:42.**

**Fourth quarter**

- KC – Ryan Succop 38-yard field goal, 12:20. Chiefs 20–6. **Drive: 5 plays, 34 yards, 2:31.**
- STL – Steven Jackson 5-yard run (Josh Brown kick), 4:04. Chiefs 20–13. **Drive: 12 plays, 72 yards, 4:23.**
- KC – Thomas Jones 2-yard run (Ryan Succop kick), 3:26. Chiefs 27–13. **Drive: 2 plays, 82 yards, 0:38.**

**Top passers**

- KC – Matt Cassel – 15/29, 184 yards, TD, INT
- STL – Sam Bradford – 21/43, 181 yards, 2 INT

**Top rushers**

- KC – Jamaal Charles – 11 rushes, 126 yards, TD
- STL – Steven Jackson – 19 rushes, 67 yards, TD

**Top receivers**

- KC – Dwayne Bowe – 2 receptions, 53 yards
- STL – Danny Amendola – 7 receptions, 60 yards

After their embarrassing loss to the Chargers the Chiefs flew to Edward Jones Dome for an interconference duel against the Rams. In the first quarter the Chiefs trailed early as kicker Josh Brown nailed a 37 and a 52-yard field goal. They took the lead with QB Matt Cassel throwing a 2-yard TD pass to TE Leonard Pope, which was extended with RB Jamaal Charles getting a 2-yard TD run, followed by kicker Ryan Succop making a 53 and a 38-yard field goal. The lead was narrowed when RB Steven Jackson got a 5-yard TD run, but the Chiefs pulled away with RB Thomas Jones getting a 2-yard TD run.

With the win, the Chiefs improved to 9–5.

==== Week 16: vs. Tennessee Titans ====
Week 16: Tennessee Titans at Kansas City Chiefs – Game summary

Quarter	1	2	3	4	Total
Titans	0	7	7	0	**14**
**Chiefs**	14	17	3	0	**34**

at Arrowhead Stadium, Kansas City, Missouri

- Date: December 26
- Game time: 12:00 p.m. CST
- Game weather: Cloudy, 19 °F (−7 °C)
- Game attendance: 65,606
- Referee: Scott Green
- TV announcers (CBS): Bill Macatee and Rich Gannon
- Recap, Game Book

Game information

**First quarter**

- KC – Jamaal Charles 14-yard pass from Matt Cassel (Ryan Succop kick), 11:19. Chiefs 7–0. **Drive: 7 plays, 69 yards, 3:41.**
- KC – Jamaal Charles 5-yard pass from Matt Cassel (Ryan Succop kick), 1:52. Chiefs 14–0. **Drive: 10 plays, 61 yards, 4:43.**

**Second quarter**

- KC – Ryan Succop 35-yard field goal, 11:31. Chiefs 17–0. **Drive: 9 plays, 46 yards, 3:38.**
- KC – Dwayne Bowe 75-yard pass from Matt Cassel (Ryan Succop kick), 7:19. Chiefs 24–0. **Drive: 4 plays, 82 yards, 2:05.**
- TEN – Kenny Britt 53-yard pass from Kerry Collins (Rob Bironas kick), 4:15. Chiefs 24–7. **Drive: 1 play, 53 yards, 0:08.**
- KC – Eric Berry 54-yard interception return (Ryan Succop kick), 0:22. Chiefs 31–7.

**Third quarter**

- KC – Ryan Succop 42-yard field goal, 5:43. Chiefs 34–7. **Drive: 4 plays, 4 yards, 1:26.**
- TEN – Jared Cook 22-yard pass from Kerry Collins (Rob Bironas kick), 3:35. Chiefs 34–14. **Drive: 5 plays, 69 yards, 2:08.**

**Fourth quarter**

- No scoring plays.

**Top passers**

- TEN – Kerry Collins – 14/37, 235 yards, 2 TD, 2 INT
- KC – Matt Cassel – 24/34, 314 yards, 3 TD

**Top rushers**

- TEN – Chris Johnson – 14 rushes, 58 yards
- KC – Jamaal Charles – 13 rushes, 77 yards

**Top receivers**

- TEN – Jared Cook – 5 receptions, 96 yards, TD
- KC – Dwayne Bowe – 6 receptions, 153 yards, TD

Coming off their win over the Rams the Chiefs played on home ground for an AFC duel with the Titans. The Chiefs took the early lead as QB Matt Cassel threw 14- and 5-yard TD passes to RB Jamaal Charles. This was followed by kicker Ryan Succop nailing a 35-yard field goal, then with Cassel making a 75-yard TD pass to WR Dwayne Bowe. The Titans responded as QB Kerry Collins got a 53-yard TD pass to WR Kenny Britt, but the Chiefs extended their lead with SS Eric Berry returning an interception 54 yards for a touchdown. This was followed by Succop making a 42-yard field goal. The Titans tried to come back, but only came away with Collins completing a 22-yard TD pass to TE Jared Cook. The defense controlled the fourth quarter, giving the Chiefs the win.

Kansas City improved to 10–5 with the win, matching its win total over the previous three seasons combined. Later in the day, the Chiefs clinched their sixth AFC West division title when San Diego lost at Cincinnati.

==== Week 17: vs. Oakland Raiders ====
Week 17: Oakland Raiders at Kansas City Chiefs – Game summary

Quarter	1	2	3	4	Total
**Raiders**	0	10	7	14	**31**
Chiefs	3	0	7	0	**10**

at Arrowhead Stadium, Kansas City, Missouri

- Date: January 2
- Game time: 12:00 p.m. CST
- Game weather: Sunny, 30 °F (−1 °C)
- Game attendance: 67,045
- Referee: Bill Leavy
- TV announcers (CBS): Spero Dedes and Randy Cross
- Recap, Game Book

Game information

**First quarter**

- KC – Ryan Succop 30-yard field goal, 11:03. Chiefs 3–0. **Drive: 4 plays, 5 yards, 0:44.**

**Second quarter**

- OAK – Chaz Schilens 5-yard pass from Jason Campbell (Sebastian Janikowski kick), 8:33. Raiders 7–3. **Drive: 14 plays, 91 yards, 6:39.**
- OAK – Sebastian Janikowski 38-yard field goal, 0:07. Raiders 10–3. **Drive: 13 plays, 54 yards, 3:06.**

**Third quarter**

- KC – Jamaal Charles 5-yard run (Ryan Succop kick), 8:02. Tied 10–10. **Drive: 6 plays, 64 yards, 2:18.**
- OAK – Michael Bush 26-yard run (Sebastian Janikowski kick), 2:26. Raiders 17–10. **Drive: 9 plays, 75 yards, 5:36.**

**Fourth quarter**

- OAK – Jacoby Ford 10-yard run (Sebastian Janikowski kick), 11:07. Raiders 24–10. **Drive: 1 play, 10 yards, 0:09.**
- OAK – Stanford Routt 22-yard interception return (Sebastian Janikowski kick), 9:11. Raiders 31–10.

**Top passers**

- OAK – Jason Campbell – 15/25, 155 yards, TD
- KC – Matt Cassel – 11/33, 115 yards, 2 INT

**Top rushers**

- OAK – Michael Bush – 25 rushes, 137 yards, TD
- KC – Jamaal Charles – 14 rushes, 87 yards, TD

**Top receivers**

- OAK – Jacoby Ford – 1 reception, 35 yards
- KC – Dwayne Bowe – 5 receptions, 68 yards

The Chiefs' sixteenth game was an AFC West rivalry rematch against the Raiders. They took the lead as kicker Ryan Succop nailed a 30-yard field goal, but fell behind with QB Jason Campbell completing a 5-yard TD pass to WR Chaz Schilens, followed by kicker Sebastian Janikowski hitting a 38-yard field goal. The Chiefs tied the game with RB Jamaal Charles getting a 5-yard TD run, but struggled again with RB Michael Bush getting a 26-yard TD run, followed by Jacoby Ford getting a 10-yard TD run, then with CB Stanford Routt returning an interception 22 yards for a touchdown.

With the loss, the Chiefs finish their season on a 10–6 record.

=== Standings ===
==== Division ====
AFC West
	W	L	T	PCT	DIV	CONF	PF	PA	STK
^{(4)} Kansas City Chiefs	10	6	0	.625	2–4	6–6	366	326	L1
San Diego Chargers	9	7	0	.563	3–3	7–5	441	322	W1
Oakland Raiders	8	8	0	.500	6–0	6–6	410	371	W1
Denver Broncos	4	12	0	.250	1–5	3–9	344	471	L1

==== Conference ====
AFC
#	Team	Division	W	L	T	PCT	DIV	CONF	SOS	SOV	STK
**Division winners**
1	New England Patriots	East	14	2	0	.875	5–1	10–2	.504	.504	W8
2 (Note: Pittsburgh clinched the AFC North title instead of Baltimore based on division record (5–1 to Baltimore's 4–2).)	Pittsburgh Steelers	North	12	4	0	.750	5–1	9–3	.500	.417	W2
3 (Note: Indianapolis clinched the AFC No. 3 seed instead of Kansas City based on a head-to-head victory.)	Indianapolis Colts	South	10	6	0	.625	4–2	8–4	.473	.425	W4
4	Kansas City Chiefs	West	10	6	0	.625	2–4	6–6	.414	.381	L1
**Wild cards**
5	Baltimore Ravens	North	12	4	0	.750	4–2	9–3	.484	.422	W4
6	New York Jets	East	11	5	0	.688	4–2	9–3	.492	.409	W1
**Did not qualify for the postseason**
7	San Diego Chargers	West	9	7	0	.563	3–3	7–5	.457	.410	W1
8 (Note: Jacksonville finished ahead of Oakland based on head-to-head victory.)	Jacksonville Jaguars	South	8	8	0	.500	3–3	7–5	.453	.383	L3
9	Oakland Raiders	West	8	8	0	.500	6–0	6–6	.469	.469	W1
10	Miami Dolphins	East	7	9	0	.438	2–4	5–7	.539	.438	L3
11 (Note: Houston finished ahead of Tennessee in the AFC South based on division record (3–3 to Tennessee's 2–4).)	Houston Texans	South	6	10	0	.375	3–3	5–7	.523	.500	W1
12	Tennessee Titans	South	6	10	0	.375	2–4	3–9	.508	.500	L2
13	Cleveland Browns	North	5	11	0	.313	1–5	3–9	.570	.475	L4
14 (Note: Denver finished ahead of Buffalo and Cincinnati based on strength of victory.)	Denver Broncos	West	4	12	0	.250	1–5	3–9	.516	.453	L1
15 (Note: Buffalo finished ahead of Cincinnati based on head-to-head victory.)	Buffalo Bills	East	4	12	0	.250	1–5	3–9	.578	.344	L2
16	Cincinnati Bengals	North	4	12	0	.250	2–4	3–9	.582	.438	L1
**Tiebreakers** (Note: When breaking ties for three or more teams under the NFL's rules, they are first broken within divisions, then comparing only the highest ranked remaining team from each division.)

== Postseason ==
=== Schedule ===
Round	Date	Opponent (seed)	Result	Record	Venue	Recap
Wild Card	January 9	Baltimore Ravens (5)	L 7–30	0–1	Arrowhead Stadium	Recap

=== Game summaries ===
==== AFC Wild Card Playoffs: vs. (5) Baltimore Ravens ====
AFC Wild Card Playoffs: (5) Baltimore Ravens at (4) Kansas City Chiefs – Game summary

Quarter	1	2	3	4	Total
Ravens	3	7	13	7	30
Chiefs	7	0	0	0	7

at Arrowhead Stadium, Kansas City, Missouri

- Date: January 9, 2011
- Game time: 12:00 p.m. CDT
- Game weather: Cloudy, 26 °F (−3 °C)
- Game attendance: 72,190
- Referee: Mike Carey
- TV announcers (CBS): Jim Nantz and Phil Simms
- Recap, Game Book

Game information

First quarter

- BAL – Billy Cundiff 19-yard field goal, 9:01. Ravens 3–0. Drive: 14 plays, 69 yards, 5:59.
- KC – Jamaal Charles 41-yard run (Ryan Succop kick), 2:09. Chiefs 7–3. Drive: 2 plays, 46 yards, 0:49.

Second quarter

- BAL – Ray Rice 9-yard pass from Joe Flacco (Billy Cundiff kick), 0:19 Ravens 10–7. Drive: 11 plays, 80 yards, 5:30.

Third quarter

- BAL – Billy Cundiff 29-yard field goal, 6:36. Ravens 13–7. Drive: 7 plays, 51 yards, 3:02.
- BAL – Billy Cundiff 29-yard field goal, 4:20. Ravens 16–7. Drive: 4 plays, 6 yards, 1:20.
- BAL – Anquan Boldin 4-yard pass from Joe Flacco (Billy Cundiff kick), 0:27. Ravens 23–7. Drive: 6 plays, 31 yards, 2:59.

Fourth quarter

- BAL – Willis McGahee 25-yard run (Billy Cundiff kick), 4:26. Ravens 30–7. Drive: 15 plays, 80 yards, 10:20.

Top passers

- BAL – Joe Flacco – 25/34, 265 yards, 2 TD
- KC – Matt Cassel – 9/18, 70 yards, 3 INT

Top rushers

- BAL – Ray Rice – 17 rushes, 57 yards
- KC – Jamaal Charles – 9 rushes, 82 yards, 1 TD

Top receivers

- BAL – Todd Heap – 10 receptions, 108 yards
- KC – Tony Moeaki – 1 reception, 22 yards

Entering the postseason as the AFC's #4 seed, the Chiefs began their playoff run at home in the AFC Wild Card Round against the #5 Baltimore Ravens. Kansas City trailed early as Ravens kicker Billy Cundiff got a 19-yard field goal, yet Kansas City answered with a 41-yard touchdown run from running back Jamaal Charles. Baltimore struck back in the second quarter as quarterback Joe Flacco completed a 9-yard touchdown pass to running back Ray Rice.

The Ravens added onto their lead in the third quarter as Cundiff made a pair of 29-yard field goals. Afterwards, Baltimore closed out the game in the fourth quarter with running back Willis McGahee getting a 25-yard touchdown run.

With the loss, not only did the Chiefs' season come to an end with an overall record of 10–7, but they also lost their NFL worst 7th straight postseason game. This would later be matched when the Detroit Lions lost their 7th straight postseason game to the New Orleans Saints during the 2011 NFL season. Chiefs lost but in 2011 missed the playoffs at 7–9.
