= Verran Tucker =

American gridiron football player (born 1988)

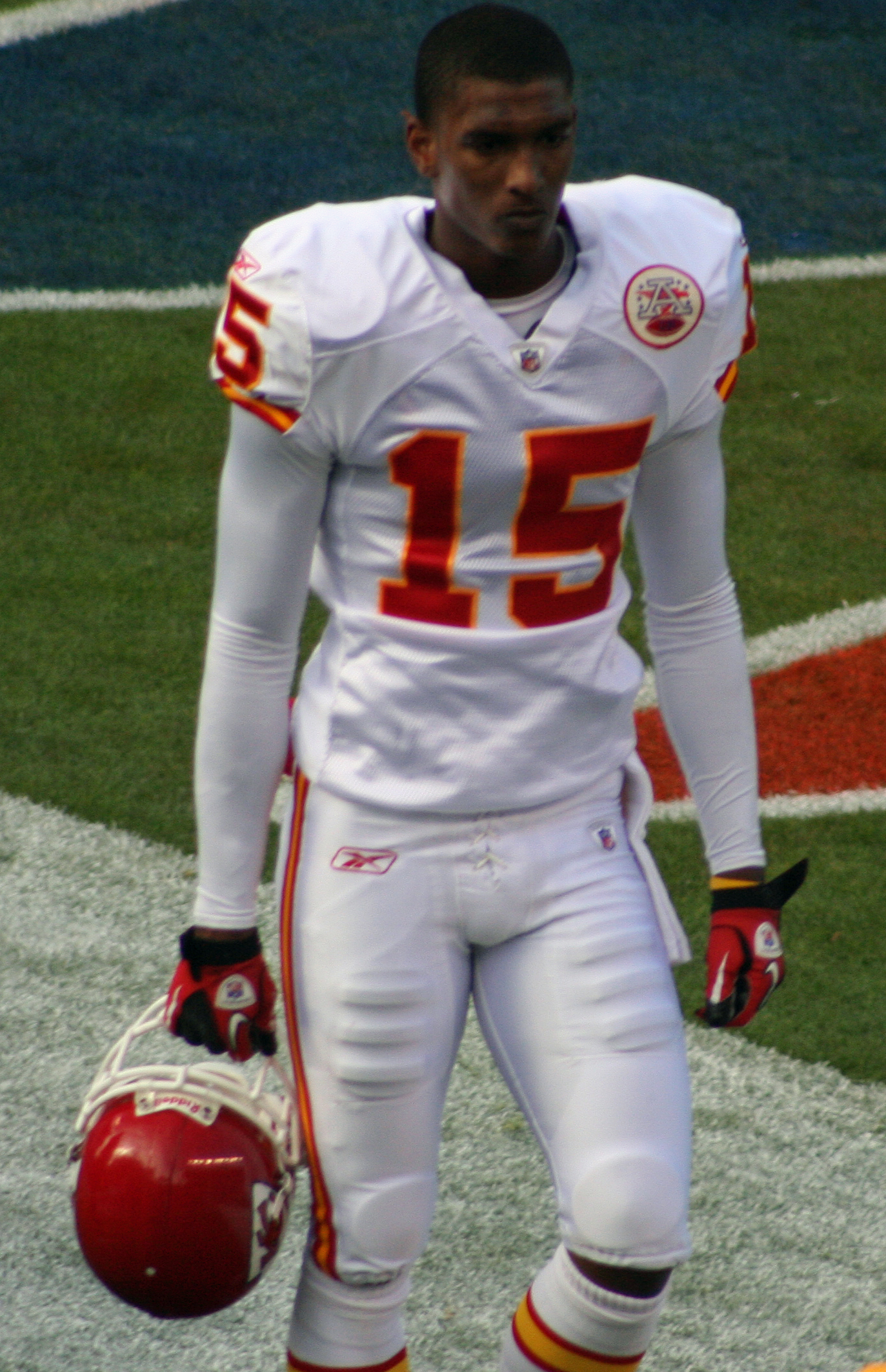
- Tucker with the Kansas City Chiefs in 2010

No. 15
- Position: Wide receiver

Personal information
- Born: June 26, 1988 (age 38); Torrance, California, U.S.
- Listed height: 6 ft 1 in (1.85 m)
- Listed weight: 204 lb (93 kg)

Career information
- High school: Fairfax (Los Angeles)
- College: California
- NFL draft: 2010: undrafted

Career history
- Dallas Cowboys (2010)*; Kansas City Chiefs (2010); Spokane Shock (2012); Edmonton Eskimos (2013)*
- * Offseason or practice squad member only

Career NFL statistics
- Games played: 11
- Receptions: 6
- Receiving yards: 114
- Receiving touchdowns: 1
- Stats at Pro Football Reference

Verran Mitchell Tucker (born June 26, 1988) is an American former professional football player who was a wide receiver in the National Football League (NFL). He was signed by the Dallas Cowboys as an undrafted free agent in 2010. He played college football for the California Golden Bears.

== Early life ==
Tucker attended Fairfax High School. In his only season of prep football as a senior, he tallied 44 receptions for 504 yards, 7 receiving touchdowns, 8 carries for 40 yards, 58 tackles and 4 interceptions. He contributed to his team winning Los Angeles City title, before being eliminated in the state playoffs.

== College career ==
Tucker enrolled at El Camino College. As a freshman in 2006, he caught 16 passes for 229 yards and four touchdowns.

As a sophomore in 2007, Tucker had 26 receptions for 538 yards and a team-high nine touchdowns. He received All-Mission League honors, while helping the team win its third straight conference title.

He transferred to the University of California, Berkeley, in 2008. As a junior with the California Golden Bears, Tucker began as a reserve, before starting the last seven games of the year at wide receiver. He was second on the team with 362 yards on 21 catches. He also had three touchdowns.

As a senior in 2009, he had 29 receptions for 453 yards and one touchdown. He had at least 50 receiving yards in five of the team's games in 2009. He ended his college career with 50 catches for 815 yards and four touchdowns, with an average of 16.3-yards per catch.

== Professional career ==
=== Dallas Cowboys ===
Tucker was signed as an undrafted free agent by the Dallas Cowboys after the 2010 NFL draft on April 26. He was cut on July 23, 2010.

=== Kansas City Chiefs ===
Tucker signed with the Kansas City Chiefs on July 31, 2010. He was waived on September 4, 2010. He was signed to the practice squad on September 5, 2010. He was promoted to the active roster to replace wide receiver Jeremy Horne on October 22, 2010. His first NFL reception was an 11-yard touchdown pass against the Oakland Raiders on November 7, 2010. He was part of a wide-receiver-by-committee approach with Terrance Copper and Chris Chambers. He had a bigger impact playing on special teams. He appeared in 11 games with 2 starts, finishing with 6 receptions for 114 yards (19-yard avg.) and one touchdown. He was released before the start of the 2011 season.

=== Spokane Shock ===
Tucker signed with the Spokane Shock on February 13, 2012. He was placed on the unable to perform list on February 23, 2012. He was released on March 26, 2012.

=== Edmonton Eskimos ===
Tucker was signed by the Edmonton Eskimos on June 2, 2013. He was released on June 10, 2013.
