= Shaun Smith (defensive lineman) =

American football player (born 1981)

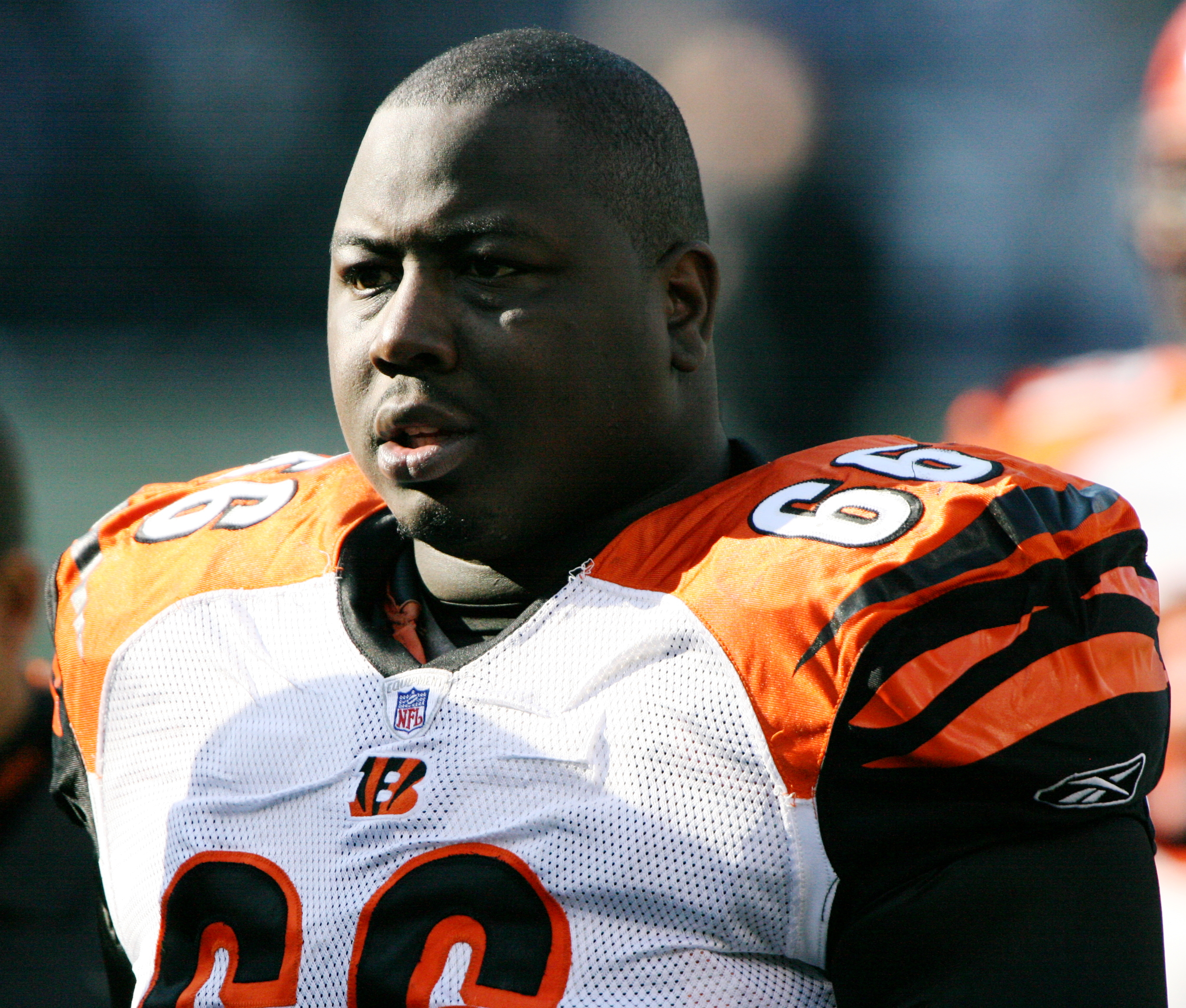
- Smith with the Cincinnati Bengals in 2006

No. 99, 66, 91, 90, 93
- Position: Defensive tackle

Personal information
- Born: August 19, 1981 (age 45); New York, New York, U.S.
- Listed height: 6 ft 2 in (1.88 m)
- Listed weight: 325 lb (147 kg)

Career information
- High school: Wichita Heights (Wichita, Kansas)
- College: South Carolina
- NFL draft: 2003: undrafted

Career history
- Dallas Cowboys (2003–2004)*; Arizona Cardinals (2004)*; New Orleans Saints (2004); Cincinnati Bengals (2004–2006); Cleveland Browns (2007–2008); Detroit Lions (2009)*; Las Vegas Locomotives (2009); Cincinnati Bengals (2009); Kansas City Chiefs (2010); Tennessee Titans (2011); Kansas City Chiefs (2012)
- * Offseason or practice squad member only

Awards and highlights
- UFL champion (2009)

Career NFL statistics
- Total tackles: 245
- Sacks: 4.0
- Forced fumbles: 2
- Pass deflections: 4
- Stats at Pro Football Reference

Shaun Jamel Smith (born August 19, 1981) is an American former professional football player who was a defensive end in the National Football League (NFL). He was signed by the Dallas Cowboys as an undrafted free agent in 2003. He played college football for the South Carolina Gamecocks.

== Early life ==
Smith attended Midwood High School in Brooklyn, New York. He transferred after his sophomore season to Wichita Heights High School in Wichita, Kansas. He played as a defensive end.

He enrolled at Butler Community College in El Dorado, Kansas. As a freshman in 1999, Smith along with teammate Rudi Johnson, contributed to the school winning the national championship by defeating Dixie College. As a sophomore in 2000, he registered 128 tackles and a school single-season record 20 sacks.

As a junior in 2001, he transferred to the University of South Carolina, where he was a backup defensive end, making 11 tackles. As a senior in 2002, he started 2 games and posted 38 tackles, one sack and one fumble recovery in 12 games.

== Professional career ==
=== Dallas Cowboys ===
Smith was signed as an undrafted free agent by the Dallas Cowboys after the 2003 NFL draft on May 1. He was signed to the practice squad on September 1 after being waived on August 31. He was released on August 31, 2004.

=== Arizona Cardinals ===
Smith was claimed off waivers by the Arizona Cardinals on September 1, 2004. He was waived five days later on September 5.

=== New Orleans Saints ===
On September 7, 2004, he was signed to the New Orleans Saints' practice squad. He was promoted to the active roster on September 18 and made his debut versus the San Francisco 49ers on September 19. He finished with 16 tackles and one start. He was released on November 30, after getting food from the Georgia Dome press box, while being deactivated for a game.

=== Cincinnati Bengals (first stint) ===
Smith was claimed off waivers by the Cincinnati Bengals on December 2, 2004. He played defensive tackle, while recording six tackles and one start. In 2005, he recorded 38 tackles in 13 games with five starts. In 2006, he registered 14 tackles. In 2007, the Bengals opted not to match the restricted free-agent offer sheet that Smith received from the Cleveland Browns.

=== Cleveland Browns ===
Smith signed a four-year deal with the Cleveland Browns as a restricted free agent on March 16, 2007. He played mostly as a defensive end in a 3-4 defense, started 11 games and made 62 tackles.

In 2008, he was tried at nose tackle during training camp, but was moved back to defensive end. He started 9 out of 11 games, while making 47 tackles and being limited with a calf injury. On December 23, various media outlets reported that Brady Quinn had a physical altercation with Smith in the Browns' weight training room, and that Smith punched Quinn in the face. Quinn denied the reports, and coach Romeo Crennel refused to comment; Browns tight end Darnell Dinkins confirmed the fight during a radio interview on WQAL. Smith did not play in the following game because of a coaches' decision. He was released on August 8, 2009.

=== Detroit Lions ===
Smith was signed by the Detroit Lions on August 10, 2009. Smith was released during the final roster cuts on September 5. He also was suspended for the first 4 games of the season for violating the league's anabolic steroid policy.

=== Las Vegas Locomotives ===
On November 19, 2009, he signed with the Las Vegas Locomotives of the United Football League, to replace an injured Wendell Bryant. He contributed to the team winning the UFL Championship game against the Florida Tuskers on November 27.

=== Cincinnati Bengals (second stint) ===
Smith was re-signed by the Bengals on December 9, 2009. He was waived on December 12 and re-signed on December 16. He was not re-signed after the season.

=== Kansas City Chiefs (first stint) ===
Smith signed with the Kansas City Chiefs on March 10, 2010. In consecutive weeks, he was accused by players from the opposing team of grabbing them in their private parts during play. Alex Mack of the Cleveland Browns made the first claim after the two teams' Week 2 matchup, followed by Anthony Davis of the San Francisco 49ers, who drew a penalty for retaliating against Smith in Week 3. Although Smith denied both allegations, he was fined by the league.

=== Tennessee Titans ===
On July 29 of 2011, he signed with the Tennessee Titans a three-year, $7.25 million contract, to play as a defensive tackle. He scored his first career rushing touchdown on Week 12 against the Seattle Seahawks. He finished with 6 starts, 25 tackles and one sack.

In 2012, he showed up in training camp out of shape and underperformed. He was released on August 22.

=== Kansas City Chiefs (second stint) ===
On November 5, 2012, he re-signed with the Chiefs, to serve as insurance in case Glenn Dorsey missed multiple games with a calf injury. He was not re-signed for the 2013 season.

== NFL career statistics ==
Legend
**Bold**	Career high

=== Regular season ===
Year	Team	Games		Tackles					Interceptions					Fumbles			
Year	Team	GP	GS	Cmb	Solo	Ast	Sck	TFL	Int	Yds	TD	Lng	PD	FF	FR	Yds	TD
2004	NOR	5	1	9	6	3	0.0	0	0	0	0	0	0	0	0	0	0
2004	CIN	3	1	2	2	0	0.0	0	0	0	0	0	0	0	0	0	0
2005	CIN	13	5	26	18	8	0.0	2	0	0	0	0	0	0	0	0	0
2006	CIN	13	0	10	6	4	0.0	0	0	0	0	0	1	0	0	0	0
2007	CLE	15	**11**	**62**	**48**	14	**2.0**	**4**	0	0	0	0	**3**	**1**	0	0	0
2008	CLE	11	9	36	26	10	0.0	1	0	0	0	0	0	**1**	0	0	0
2009	CIN	3	0	8	3	5	0.0	0	0	0	0	0	0	0	0	0	0
2010	KAN	**16**	10	56	30	**26**	1.0	**4**	0	0	0	0	0	0	0	0	0
2011	TEN	15	6	25	17	8	1.0	3	0	0	0	0	0	0	0	0	0
2012	KAN	8	0	11	9	2	0.0	1	0	0	0	0	0	0	0	0	0
Career		102	43	245	165	80	4.0	15	0	0	0	0	4	2	0	0	0

=== Playoffs ===
Year	Team	Games		Tackles					Interceptions					Fumbles			
Year	Team	GP	GS	Cmb	Solo	Ast	Sck	TFL	Int	Yds	TD	Lng	PD	FF	FR	Yds	TD
2005	CIN	**1**	0	1	0	1	0.0	0	0	0	0	0	0	0	0	0	0
2009	CIN	**1**	0	7	3	4	0.0	0	0	0	0	0	0	0	0	0	0
2010	KAN	**1**	**1**	**9**	**4**	**5**	0.0	0	0	0	0	0	0	0	0	0	0
Career		3	1	17	7	10	0.0	0	0	0	0	0	0	0	0	0	0
