= Adam Zimmer =

American football player and coach (1984–2022)

Personal information
- Born: January 13, 1984; Ogden, Utah, U.S.
- Died: October 31, 2022 (aged 38); Mendota Heights, Minnesota, U.S.

Career information
- High school: Colleyville Heritage (Colleyville, Texas)
- College: Trinity

Career history
- New Orleans Saints (2006–2009) Assistant linebackers coach; Kansas City Chiefs (2010–2012) Assistant linebackers coach; Cincinnati Bengals (2013) Assistant defensive backs coach; Minnesota Vikings (2014–2019) Linebackers coach; Minnesota Vikings (2020–2021) Co-defensive coordinator & linebackers coach; Cincinnati Bengals (2022) Offensive analyst

Awards and highlights
- Super Bowl champion (XLIV)
- Coaching profile at Pro Football Reference

Adam Zimmer (January 13, 1984 – October 31, 2022) was an American professional football coach in the National Football League (NFL). He was an assistant defensive backs coach and offensive analyst for the Cincinnati Bengals, assistant linebackers coach for the Kansas City Chiefs and New Orleans Saints, and linebackers coach and co-defensive coordinator for the Minnesota Vikings. Zimmer was the son of former Vikings head coach Mike Zimmer.

== Early life ==
Born in Ogden, Utah, on January 13, 1984, Zimmer grew up in Colleyville, Texas, and attended Heritage High School while his father Mike Zimmer was a defensive coach for the Dallas Cowboys. His grandfather Bill Zimmer coached football at Lockport Township High School for 35 years. By age 10, Zimmer knew that he wanted to follow his father's and grandfather's careers and become a football coach.

== Playing career ==
Zimmer played for the Trinity University Tigers football team as a safety from 2002 to 2005, where he wore #28.

== Coaching career ==
=== New Orleans Saints ===
Zimmer landed his first coaching job with the New Orleans Saints as an assistant linebackers' coach in 2006. During his first season in the NFL, the Saints won the NFC South Division Title and made it to the NFC Championship game. In the 2009 season, Zimmer's final season in New Orleans, the Saints went on to win Super Bowl XLIV.

=== Kansas City Chiefs ===
Zimmer became the Chiefs' assistant linebackers coach in the 2010 season. In his first season, he helped the Chiefs allow 46.2 fewer rushing yards per game compared to the year before. In the 2011 season, linebackers Tamba Hali and Derrick Johnson were selected to the Pro Bowl. During the 2012 season, linebacker Jovan Belcher fatally shot his girlfriend, then drove to the Chiefs' facility where he committed suicide in front of head coach Romeo Crennel. Zimmer was strongly affected by this, especially after he had recently lost his mother to natural causes in 2009. Zimmer was let go when Kansas City fired Crennel after the 2012 season.

=== Cincinnati Bengals ===
For the 2013 season, Zimmer joined the Bengals alongside his father Mike Zimmer as an assistant defensive backs coach while his dad was the defensive coordinator.

=== Minnesota Vikings ===
When Mike Zimmer became the 9th head coach of the Minnesota Vikings for the 2014 season, Adam Zimmer was brought in to be the linebackers' coach. The Vikings won the NFC North Division Title in the 2015 season, allowing 18.9 points per game on defense, ranked 5th-best in the NFL. Linebacker Anthony Barr was selected to the 2016 Pro Bowl as a replacement for Jamie Collins. On January 27, 2020, Zimmer and defensive line coach Andre Patterson were named co-defensive coordinators for the 2020 season. Both Zimmers along with the majority of the coaching staff were fired following the conclusion of the 2021 season.

=== Return to Bengals ===
Following his firing by the Vikings, Zimmer was hired by the Bengals as an offensive analyst.

== Death ==
Zimmer died on October 31, 2022, at age 38, in Mendota Heights, Minnesota. Mendota Heights police responded to a welfare check request at his home at 1:13 pm CDT, and found Zimmer dead inside. His death was not believed to be suspicious. His cause of death was not initially known but an autopsy was scheduled. On December 16, 2022, The Hennepin County Medical Examiner's Office announced that Zimmer's cause of death was complications of chronic ethanol use disorder. The disorder can be caused by excessive drinking or by having withdrawal symptom while drastically cutting back or completely stopping drinking.
