= Ryan Succop =

American football player (born 1986)

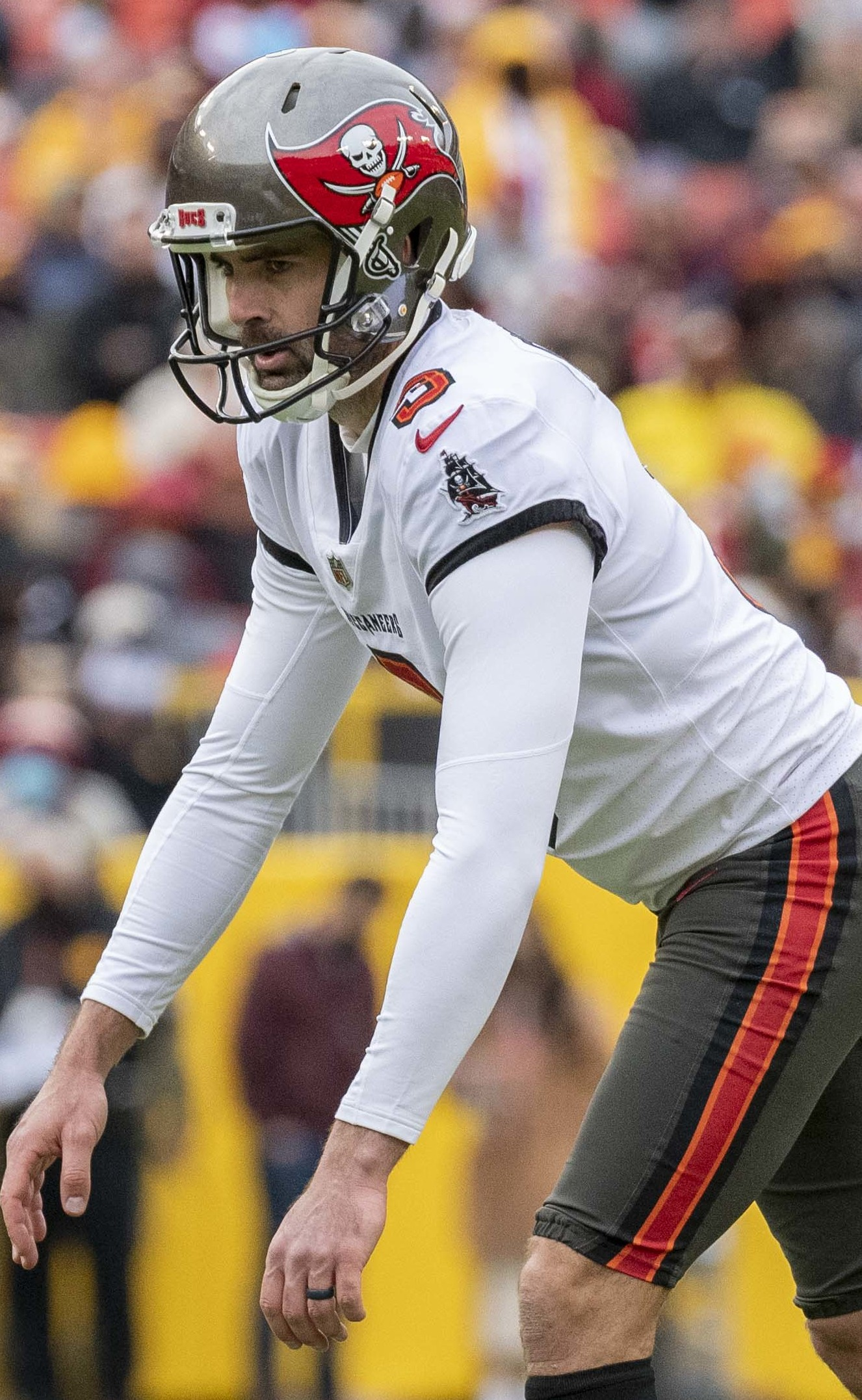
- Succop with the Tampa Bay Buccaneers in 2021

No. 6, 8, 4, 3
- Position: Placekicker

Personal information
- Born: September 19, 1986 (age 40); Hickory, North Carolina, U.S.
- Listed height: 6 ft 2 in (1.88 m)
- Listed weight: 218 lb (99 kg)

Career information
- High school: Hickory
- College: South Carolina (2005–2008)
- NFL draft: 2009: 7th round, 256th overall pick

Career history
- Kansas City Chiefs (2009–2013); Tennessee Titans (2014–2019); Tampa Bay Buccaneers (2020–2022)

Awards and highlights
- Super Bowl champion (LV); PFWA All-Rookie Team (2009); 2× Second-team All-SEC (2006, 2007)

Career NFL statistics
- Field goals made: 320
- Field goals attempted: 386
- Field goal %: 82.9
- Longest field goal: 54
- Touchbacks: 347
- Stats at Pro Football Reference

Ryan Barrow Succop (/ˈsʌkʌp/ SUCK-up; born September 19, 1986) is an American former professional football placekicker in the National Football League (NFL). He played college football for the South Carolina Gamecocks and was the 2009 Mr. Irrelevant by virtue of being selected by the Kansas City Chiefs with the final pick of the 2009 NFL draft. Succop has also played for the Tennessee Titans and Tampa Bay Buccaneers. He was the placekicker for the Buccaneers in their 31–9 victory over the Chiefs in Super Bowl LV, becoming the first Mr. Irrelevant to play and win a Super Bowl as a starter and an active player.

== Early life ==
Succop attended Hickory High School in Hickory, North Carolina. He was a four-time all-conference and two-time all-state performer, and was named a three-time conference special teams Player of the Year. Succop also played soccer, where he was a three-time all-state selection and scored 104 career goals. Succop was rated the fourth-best kicker in the nation and the sixteenth-best prospect in North Carolina by Rivals.com.

== College career ==
Succop attended the University of South Carolina, where he performed kicking, punting, and kickoff duties for the Gamecocks. Succop's 251 career points rank 10th on South Carolina's all-time list.

As a freshman in 2005, Succop was the kickoff specialist and backup placekicker behind Josh Brown. He kicked off 59 times for a 62.3-yard average with 29 touchbacks. Succop had two field goal attempts, missing both.

As a sophomore in 2006, Succop was named SEC Special Teams Player of the Week after a game where he was 3-for-3 on field goals against Mississippi State. Succop handled the kicking and punting duties for the Gamecocks as a sophomore and senior. He scored 85 points in 2006, which led the team and was the third-highest single-season total in school history. Succop also earned second-team All-SEC honors and was named a semi-finalist for the Lou Groza Award.

As a junior in 2007, Succop was named an Associated Press honorable mention All-SEC selection. He also earned SEC first-team preseason honors as a placekicker by the media. Succop was a second-team selection by the coaches and earned preseason second-team All-SEC honors as a punter by both the media and coaches. He was once again a Lou Groza Award candidate, and Succop was also named to the Ray Guy Award watch list. He went 13-for-17 in field goal attempts, earning SEC Special Teams Player of the Week honors after making all three field goals in a game.

As a senior, Succop participated in all 13 games and connected on 20-of-30 field goals, which was good enough for fourth in the SEC in percentage but was the most in both attempts and makes.

== Professional career ==
=== Kansas City Chiefs ===
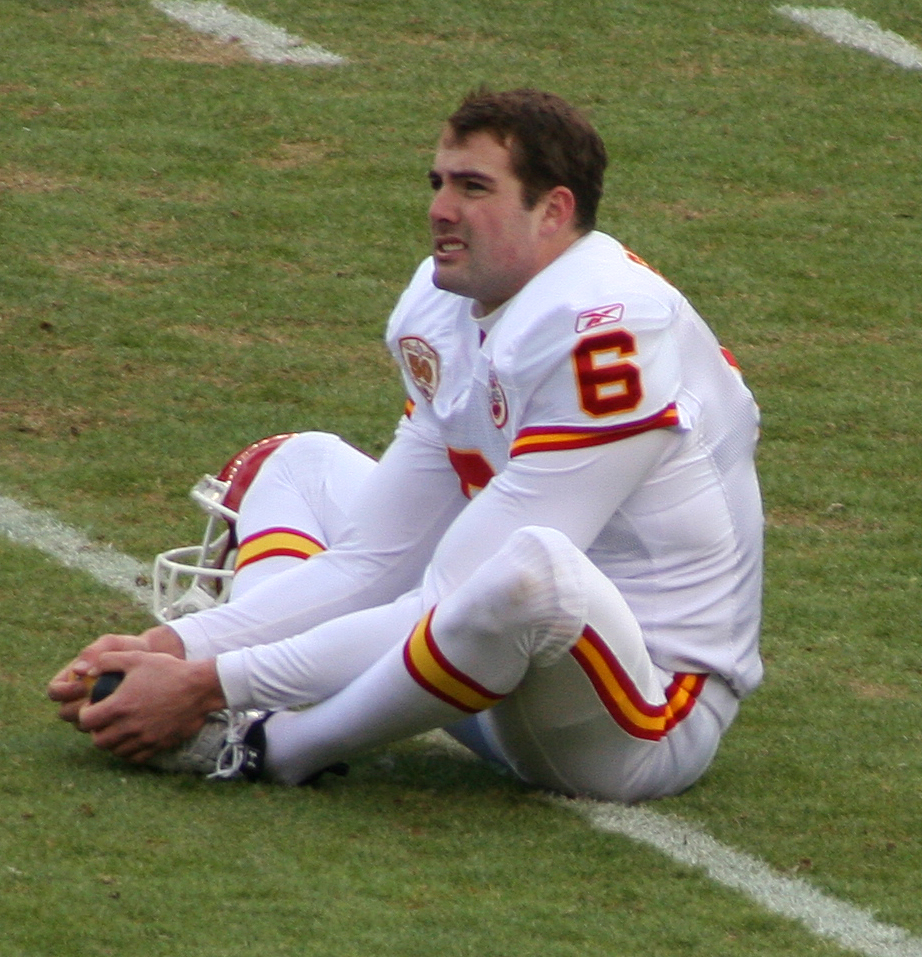
Succop in 2010

Succop was selected by the Kansas City Chiefs as the final selection, 256th overall, of the 2009 NFL draft, earning him the title of Mr. Irrelevant. Succop said of being drafted last, "I didn't choose to be Mr. Irrelevant. It just worked out that way. I'm just trying not to get caught up in it and focus more on the task at hand, which is trying to come in here and help the team. It's not one of those things I really think about too much, to be honest."

Succop and the Chiefs agreed on a three-year deal worth up to $1.2 million on June 17, 2009. He competed with Connor Barth for the job until Barth was released in July 2009.

On November 22, 2009, Succop kicked a 22-yard field goal in overtime to give Kansas City a 27–24 victory over the Pittsburgh Steelers.

Succop finished his rookie season tying an NFL record for highest field goal percentage by a rookie in a season with 86.2% at the time. He passed Hall of Famer Jan Stenerud for most field goals made by a rookie in Chiefs history at the time. He earned the Chiefs' 2009 Mack Lee Hill Award and scored more points, 104, than any other rookie in the NFL that year. Succop was named to NFL's All-Rookie team his rookie year.

On October 31, 2010, Succop made a 35-yard, game-winning field goal as time expired in overtime over the Buffalo Bills, 13–10. In the 2010 season, Succop converted all 42 extra point attempts and 20 of 26 field goal attempts.

During Week 4 of the 2011 season, Succop made five field goals and an extra point in a 22–17 victory over the Minnesota Vikings. He earned AFC Special Teams Player of the Week for his game against the Vikings. During Week 8, Succop made a field goal in overtime to beat the San Diego Chargers. During Week 14 against Green Bay Packers, he converted all four field goal attempts and one extra point in the 19–14 victory. He earned AFC Special Teams Player of the Week for his game against Green Bay. In the 2011 season, Succop converted all 20 extra point attempts and 24 of 30 field goal attempts. At the end of the season, Succop signed a five-year contract extension worth $14 million, which includes $2 million in guaranteed salary.

On September 23, 2012, Succop went 6-for-6 and became the Chiefs' all-time leader in field goals en route to a 27–24 OT win at the New Orleans Saints. In the 2012 season, Succop converted all 17 extra point attempts and 28 of 34 of field goal attempts.

During Week 8 of the 2013 season, Succop converted three of four field goals and two extra points in the 23–17 victory over the Cleveland Browns. He was named AFC Special Teams Player of the Week for his performance. On December 29, 2013, Succop missed a 41-yard field goal against the San Diego Chargers with 4 seconds remaining in regulation. This caused the game to go into overtime and allowed the Chargers to win. Succop finished the 2013 season converting all 52 extra point attempts and 22 of 28 field goal attempts.

Succop was waived on August 30, 2014, during the Chiefs final preseason cuts in a salary-cap move.

=== Tennessee Titans ===
==== 2014 season ====
Succop was signed by the Tennessee Titans to a one-year contract on September 1, 2014. His first game for the Titans was on September 7 against the Kansas City Chiefs; he made four field goal attempts and converted two extra points as the Titans won by a score of 26–10. Succop was re-signed after the season to a three-year $7.2 million contract. In the 2014 season, Succop converted all 27 extra point attempts and 19 of 22 field goal attempts.

==== 2015 season ====
In the 2015 season, Succop went 29-of-31 on extra point attempts and 14-of-16 on field goal attempts.

==== 2016 season ====
During Week 15, Succop was named the AFC Special Teams Player of the Week after hitting a game-winning 53-yard field goal in the final seconds of a 19–17 road victory over the Kansas City Chiefs. In the 2016 season, he converted 39-of-41 extra point attempts and 22-of-24 field goal attempts.

==== 2017 season ====
Succop won AFC Special Teams Player of the Month for September 2017 for going 10-of-11 on field goals, converting eight extra points, and leading the NFL with 38 points. In a Week 6 victory against the Indianapolis Colts, Succop converted all five field goal attempts and set a record for the most consecutive field goals inside 50 yards, earning him AFC Special Teams Player of the Week for the fifth time in his career. In Week 7, the Titans won in overtime 12–9 against the Cleveland Browns when Succop kicked the game-winning field goal. Succop finished the 2017 season with career highs of 136 points and 35 field goals. His 42 field goal attempts led the league in 2017.

==== 2018 season ====
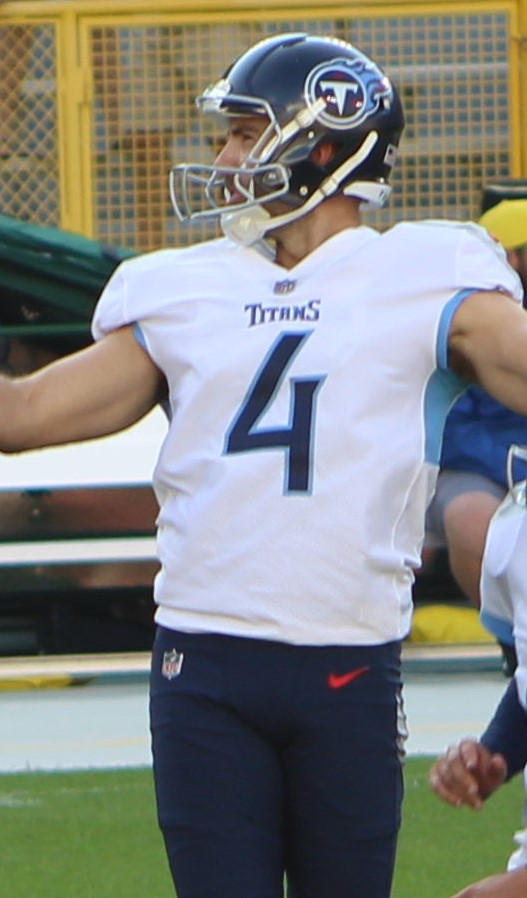
Succop in 2018

On February 20, 2018, Succop signed a five-year, $20 million contract extension with the Titans. Succop finished the 2018 season going 26-of-30 for field goals and 28-of-31 for extra points.

==== 2019 season ====
After offseason knee surgery, Succop was placed on injured reserve on September 4, 2019. His replacement was Cairo Santos, who replaced Succop in Kansas City in 2014. He was designated for return from injured reserve on October 23, 2019, and began practicing with the team. Succop was added to the active roster 10 days later. He was placed on injured reserve on December 18, ending his season.

On March 13, 2020, Succop was released by the Titans after six seasons.

=== Tampa Bay Buccaneers ===
==== 2020 season ====
On September 1, 2020, Succop signed a one-year deal with the Tampa Bay Buccaneers.

During Week 8 against the New York Giants on Monday Night Football, Succop was 4-for-4 on field goal attempts in the narrow 25–23 victory. Succop was named the NFC Special Teams Player of the Week for his performance. He was placed on the reserve/COVID-19 list by the team on December 15, 2020, and activated three days later. During Week 17 against the Atlanta Falcons, Succop went 3-for-3 on field goals and 5-for-5 on extra point in the 44–27 victory. Succop was named the NFC Special Teams Player of the Week for his performance. Overall, Succop finished 28 of 31 on field goals attempts and 52 of 57 on extra points attempts in the 2020 season. He set a franchise record for points scored in a season with 136, breaking Matt Bryant's mark of 131 from 2008.

During Super Bowl LV against his former team, the Kansas City Chiefs, Succop went 4-for-4 on extra points and 1-for-1 on field goal attempts in a 31–9 victory, becoming in the process the first Mr. Irrelevant to play and win a Super Bowl as a starter and an active player.

==== 2021 season ====
On March 25, 2021, Succop signed a three-year, $12 million contract extension with the Buccaneers.

During the season-opener, Succop made the game-winning field goal in the final seconds for a 31–29 win over the Dallas Cowboys. He also had another game-winning field goal three weeks later against the New England Patriots, in a narrow 19–17 road victory. Overall, Succop finished 25 of 30 on field goals attempts and 56 of 59 on extra points attempts in the 2021 season. His extra points made and attempted led the league in the 2021 season.

==== 2022 season ====
During the season-opener against the Dallas Cowboys, Succop went 4-for-5 on field goals and 1-for-1 on extra points in a 19–3 road victory. During Week 16 against the Arizona Cardinals, he made the game-winning field goal in overtime for a 19–16 win. Overall, Succop finished 31 of 38 on field goals attempts and 24 of 25 on extra points attempts in the 2022 season.

Succop was released by the Buccaneers on March 23, 2023.

== Career statistics ==
=== NFL ===
Legend
	Won the Super Bowl
	Led the league
**Bold**	Career high

==== Regular season ====
Year	Team	GP	Overall FGs					PATs				Kickoffs					Points
Year	Team	GP	Blk	Lng	FGM	FGA	Pct	XPA	XPM	Pct	Blk	KO	Avg	TB	Ret	Avg	Points
2009	KC	16	1	53	25	29	86.2	29	29	**100.0**	0	72	61.8	7	59	24.2	104
2010	KC	16	1	53	20	26	76.9	42	42	**100.0**	0	78	60.6	8	**66**	20.2	102
2011	KC	16	**2**	**54**	24	30	80.0	20	20	**100.0**	0	59	60.8	31	24	24.5	92
2012	KC	16	0	52	28	34	82.4	17	17	**100.0**	0	58	61.7	27	27	27.6	101
2013	KC	16	1	51	22	28	78.6	52	52	**100.0**	0	**91**	64.4	47	42	24.4	118
2014	TEN	16	0	51	19	22	86.4	27	27	**100.0**	0	63	63.0	31	29	28.4	84
2015	TEN	16	0	51	14	16	87.5	31	29	93.5	1	66	**64.7**	43	22	27.2	71
2016	TEN	16	0	53	22	24	**91.7**	41	39	95.1	1	82	62.0	**58**	20	22.6	105
2017	TEN	16	1	52	**35**	**42**	83.3	33	31	93.9	1	80	64.0	47	32	23.4	**136**
2018	TEN	16	0	**54**	26	30	86.7	31	28	90.3	1	70	64.0	45	24	**28.7**	106
2019	TEN	6	1	31	1	6	16.7	25	24	96.0	0	17	59.7	3	13	23.0	27
2020	TB	16	1	50	28	31	90.3	57	52	91.2	**2**	1	16.0	—	—	—	**136**
2021	TB	17	0	48	25	30	83.3	**59**	**56**	95.0	0	—	—	—	—	—	131
2022	TB	17	**2**	**54**	31	38	81.6	25	24	96.0	0	—	—	—	—	—	117
Total		216	8	54	320	386	82.9	489	470	96.3	6	737	59.1	347	358	22.7	1,182

==== Postseason ====
Year	Team	GP	Overall FGs					PATs				Kickoffs					Points
Year	Team	GP	Blk	Lng	FGM	FGA	Pct	XPA	XPM	Pct	Blk	KO	Avg	TB	Ret	Avg	Points
2010	KC	1	0	0	0	0	0.0	1	1	**100.0**	0	2	60.6	1	—	69.5	1
2013	KC	1	0	43	3	3	**100.0**	1	1	**100.0**	0	9	66.6	6	—	58.1	14
2017	TEN	2	0	49	1	1	**100.0**	3	3	**100.0**	0	8	58.1	2	—	25.0	6
2020	TB	4	0	**52**	**9**	**9**	**100.0**	**13**	**12**	92.3	0	—	—	—	—	—	**39**
2021	TB	2	0	34	3	4	75.0	7	7	**100.0**	0	—	—	—	—	—	16
Total		10	0	52	16	17	94.1	28	29	96.6	0	19	60.1	9	—	40.7	76

=== College ===
Season	Kicking					
Season	FGM	FGA	PCT	XPM	XPA	PTS
2005	0	2	0.0	0	0	0
2006	16	20	80.0	37	39	85
2007	13	17	76.5	37	37	76
2008	20	30	66.7	30	30	90
Career	49	69	71.0	104	106	251

== Career highlights ==
NFL

- Super Bowl champion (LV)
- PFWA All-Rookie Team (2009)
- Titans record most consecutive successful field goals from inside 50 yards: 56

College

- 2× Second-team All-SEC (2006, 2007)

== Personal life ==
Succop married his wife, Paige, in 2011. They have a son and a daughter.
