= Mike Clark (American football, born 1954) =

American football coach

Mike Clark (born August 22, 1954) is a strength and conditioning coach. Clark was a part of Mike Holmgren's staff that helped guide the Seattle Seahawks to a Super Bowl XL appearance. He has also served as the strength coach with college football's Texas A&M Aggies for 14 seasons.
