= Jeremy Horne =

American football player (born 1986)

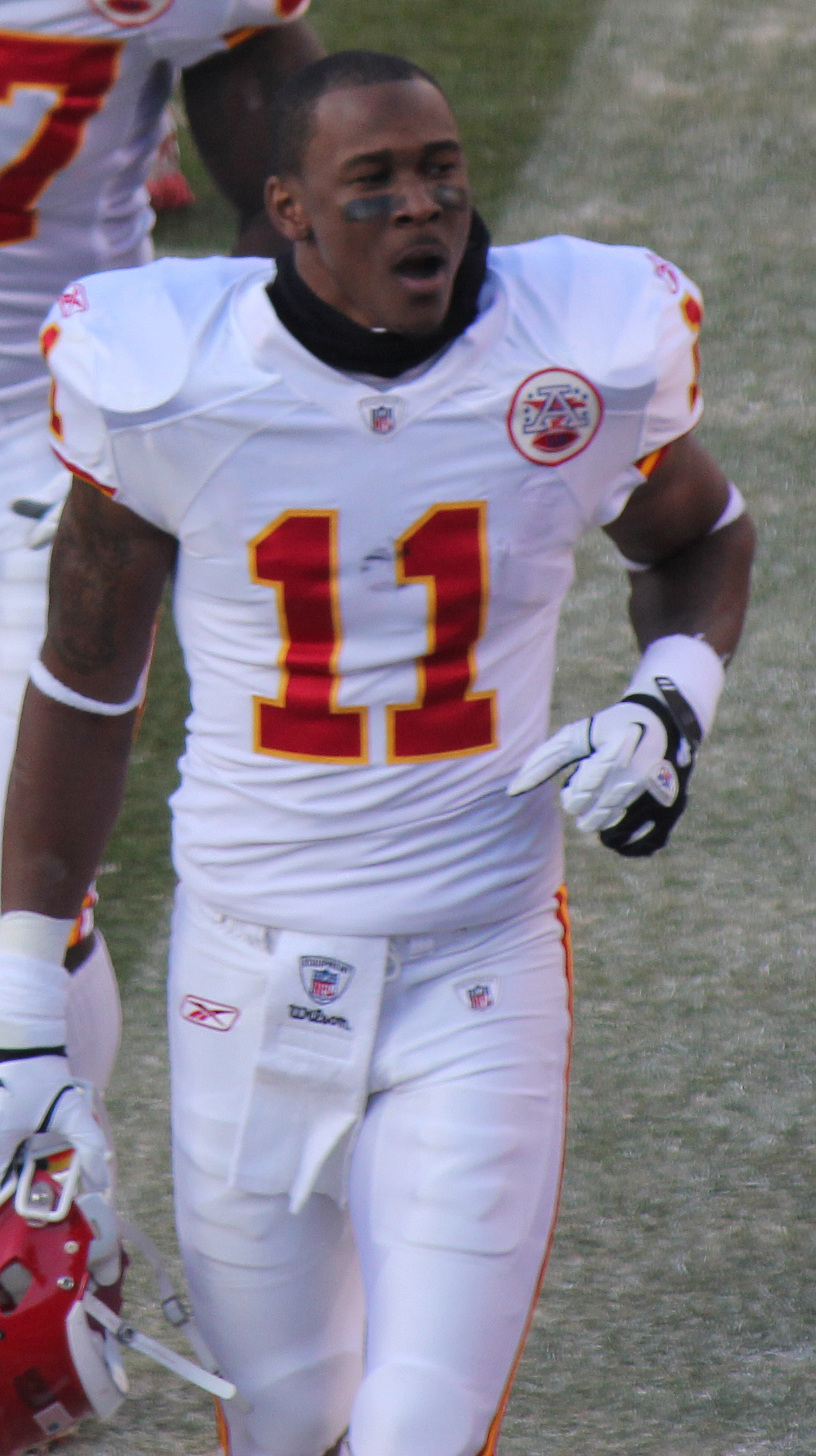
- Horne during the 2011 NFL season

No. 11, 80
- Position: Wide receiver

Personal information
- Born: October 25, 1986 (age 40); Albany, New York, U.S.
- Listed height: 6 ft 2 in (1.88 m)
- Listed weight: 193 lb (88 kg)

Career information
- College: UMass
- NFL draft: 2010: undrafted

Career history
- Kansas City Chiefs (2010−2012); New York Giants (2013)*; Calgary Stampeders (2014)*
- * Offseason or practice squad member only

Career NFL statistics
- Rushing yards: 5
- Stats at Pro Football Reference

Jeremy Roger Horne (born October 25, 1986) is an American former professional football player who was a wide receiver for the Kansas City Chiefs of the National Football League (NFL). He was signed by the Chiefs after going undrafted in the 2010 NFL draft. He played college football for the UMass Minutemen after transferring from Syracuse following his freshman year.

== College career ==
Horne attended Syracuse University his freshman year and played in seven games, primarily on special teams. He transferred to UMass after his first season. In three years at UMass, Horne recorded 85 catches for 1,343 yards and scored 11 touchdowns and also served as a kickoff returner. He was named a third-team All-Colonial Athletic Conference Wide Receiver in his junior season.

== Professional career ==
=== Kansas City Chiefs ===
Horne signed as a free agent with the Kansas City Chiefs after going undrafted in the 2010 NFL draft. He was on the Chiefs active roster for the first six games of the season making appearances in three of them. He spent the last ten games of the year on the practice squad. On January 11, 2011, Horne was signed by the Chiefs to a reserve/future deal. He was waived during final cuts during the 2011 season. After clearing waivers, he was signed to the Chiefs practice squad. On September 21, 2011, Horne was activated to the Chiefs active roster, taking running back Jamaal Charles's roster spot, after he was placed on injured reserve. He was waived on October 26, but was signed to the practice squad the following day. Horne was once again activated to the active roster on November 21. Horne finished the season with 5 rushing yards on 1 carry.

=== New York Giants ===
On May 12, 2013, Horne signed as a free agent with the New York Giants. On July 30, 2013, Horne was carted off the field with a foot injury. On August 1, 2013, Horne was waived/injured by the New York Giants. He cleared waivers and was placed on injured reserve. On August 7, 2013, Horne was released with an injury settlement.
