= Terrance Copper =

American football player (born 1982)

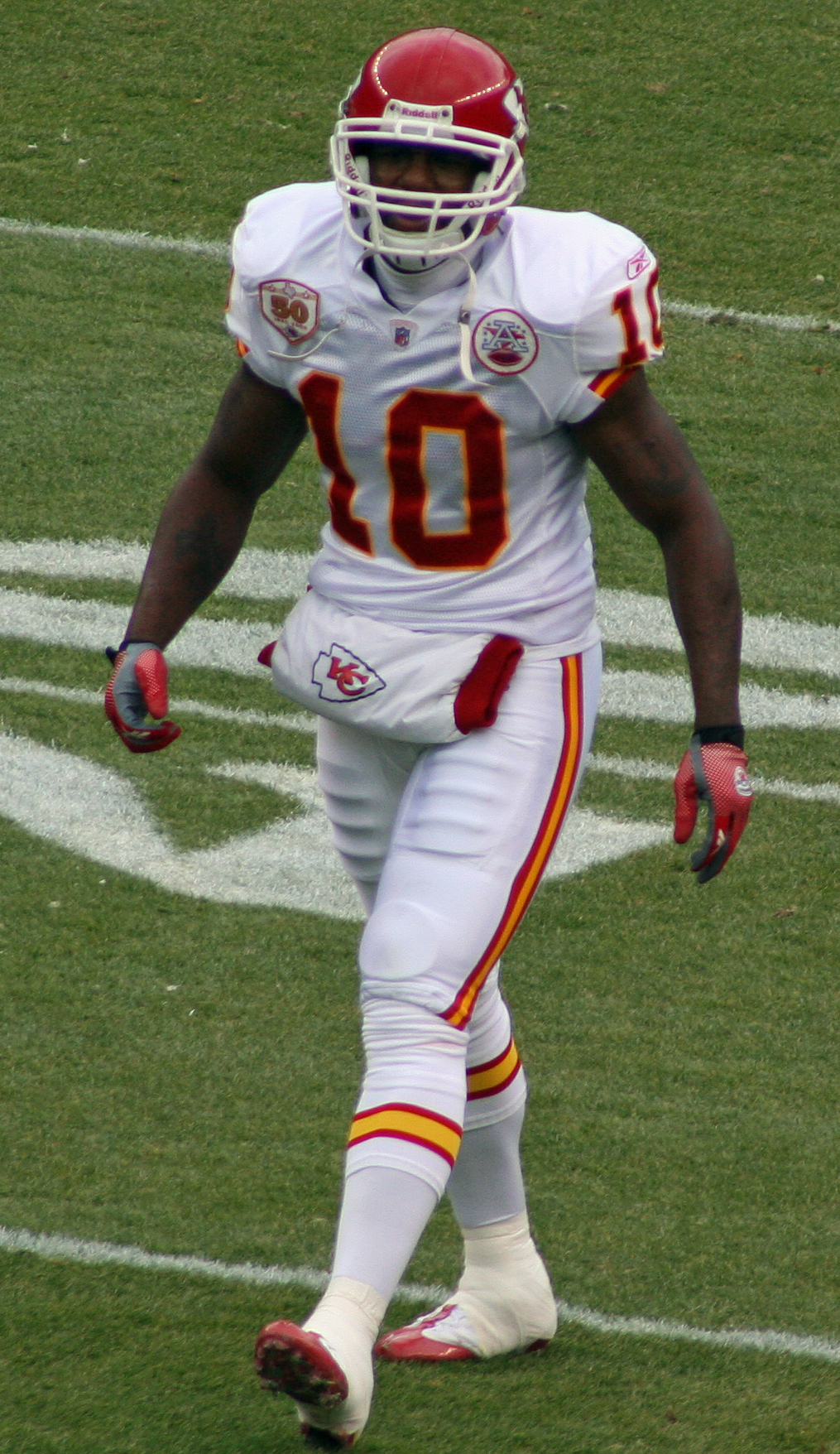
- Copper with the Kansas City Chiefs in 2010

No. 18, 15, 10
- Position: Wide receiver

Personal information
- Born: March 12, 1982 (age 44); Washington, North Carolina, U.S.
- Listed height: 6 ft 0 in (1.83 m)
- Listed weight: 207 lb (94 kg)

Career information
- High school: Washington
- College: East Carolina
- NFL draft: 2004: undrafted

Career history
- Dallas Cowboys (2004−2005); New Orleans Saints (2006−2008); Baltimore Ravens (2008); Kansas City Chiefs (2009−2012)

Awards and highlights
- All-C-USA (2003)

Career NFL statistics
- Receptions: 84
- Receiving yards: 1,018
- Receiving touchdowns: 6
- Stats at Pro Football Reference

Terrance Terrell Copper Sr. (born March 12, 1982) is an American former professional football player who was a wide receiver in the National Football League (NFL) for the Dallas Cowboys, New Orleans Saints, Baltimore Ravens and Kansas City Chiefs. He played college football for the East Carolina Pirates.

== Early life ==
Copper was a 2000 graduate of Washington High School. He finished as the school's career-leader in receptions (159) and receiving yards (2,826). He also had 27 touchdowns.

He was a three-time all-conference and all-area selection and set season records with 55 receptions in 1997 and 697 receiving yards in 1999. As a freshman, he had 25 catches for 402 yards and three scores. As a sophomore, he set school records with 55 grabs for 1,000 yards, including 4 touchdowns. As a junior, he had 38 catches for 683 yards and seven touchdowns. In his last year, he registered 41 receptions for 741 yards and 13 touchdowns.

He earned honorable-mention All-American honors from USA Today. Copper was also selected to play in the Shrine Bowl and East/West All-Star game his senior season.

== College career ==
Copper accepted a football scholarship from East Carolina University. As a true freshman, he played in 11 games (2 starts), making 9 receptions for 187 yards, one touchdown and averaged 22.8 yards on 4 kickoff returns.

As a sophomore, he started the first 4 games at the H-back position with the departure of Keith Stokes and had David Garrard as the team's quarterback. He collected 13 receptions for 124 yards, 9 carries for 49 yards, one touchdown and returned 10 punts for 70 yards.

As a junior, he started 9 out of 12 games, registering 30 receptions for 395 yards and returned 30 punts for 328 yards.

As a senior in 2003, he led Conference USA with 87 receptions (school record). He also had 897 receiving yards (school record), two touchdowns and returned 27 punts for 124 yards. He became the first player in school history to receive All-Conference USA honors.

He finished his college career without missing a game, while registering 139 receptions (second in school history), 1,683 receiving yards (fourth in school history), 3 receiving touchdowns, 211 yards on nine kickoff returns (23.4 avg), 522 yards on 67 punt returns (7.8 avg) and 72 rushing yards and one touchdown on 16 carries (4.5 avg). In 2013, he was named to the school's All-Time Offensive Team.

== Professional career ==
Pre-draft measurables
| Height | Weight | Arm length | Hand span | 40-yard dash | 10-yard split | 20-yard split | 20-yard shuttle | Three-cone drill | Vertical jump | Broad jump | Bench press |
|---|---|---|---|---|---|---|---|---|---|---|---|
| 5 ft 11 7/8 in (1.83 m) | 208 lb (94 kg) | 30 5/8 in (0.78 m) | 8 7/8 in (0.23 m) | 4.43 s | 1.59 s | 2.67 s | 4.31 s | 7.06 s | 38.5 in (0.98 m) | 9 ft 11 in (3.02 m) | 14 reps |
All values from NFL Combine/Pro Day

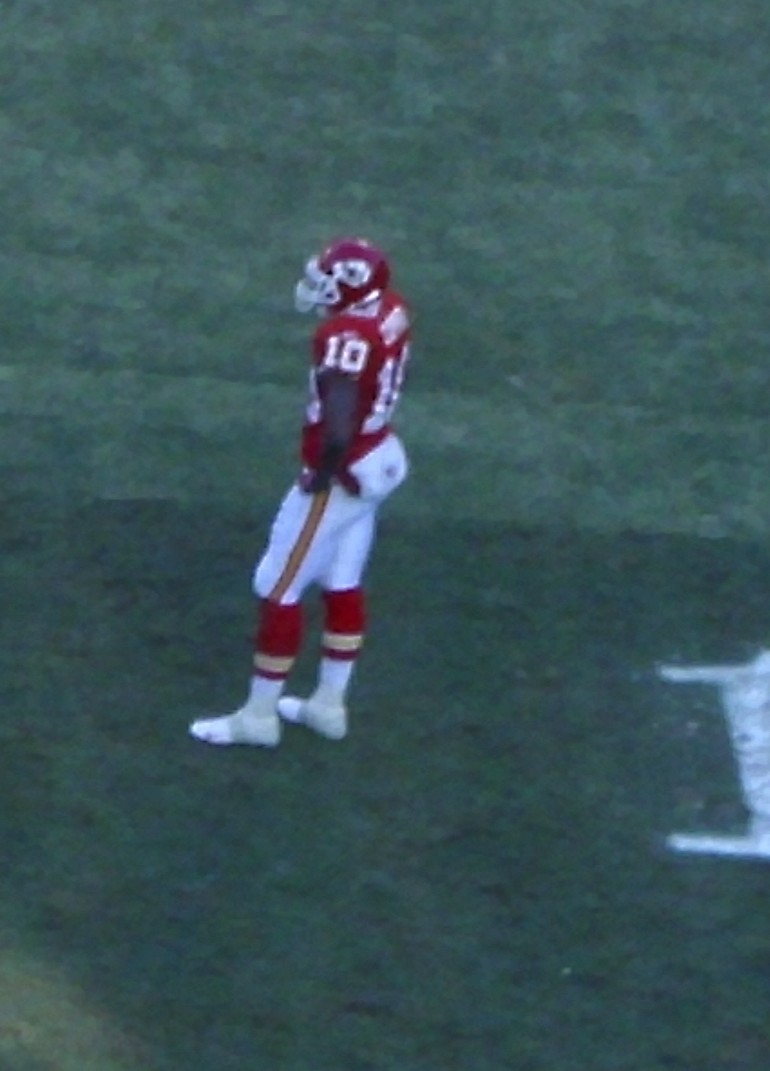
Copper on the field during a game

=== Dallas Cowboys ===
Copper was signed as an undrafted free agent by the Dallas Cowboys after the 2004 NFL draft on April 30. He was released on September 5 and signed to the practice squad on September 6. He was promoted to the active roster on October 4. As a rookie, he played in 10 games and made seven receptions for 84 yards, but his main contribution came on special teams, where he had 14 tackles (fifth on the team) and returned 16 kickoffs for 307 yards (19.2 avg.).

In 2005, he appeared in all 16 games, playing primarily on special teams, he totaled 11 special teams tackles (fifth on the team) and 2 kickoff returns for 32 yards. He was released on September 2, 2006.

=== New Orleans Saints ===
On September 3, 2006, he was claimed by the New Orleans Saints, reuniting him with new head coach and former Cowboys offensive coordinator Sean Payton. He played in 15 games (four starts) and started his first NFL game against the Tampa Bay Buccaneers on November 5. The next week, he started against the Pittsburgh Steelers, registering a career-high six receptions for 92 yards. He caught a 48-yard Hail Mary pass against the Atlanta Falcons on November 26. He finished with 23 receptions for 385 yards, 3 touchdowns and 3 special teams tackles.

In 2007, he had 11 special teams tackles. On October 14, 2008, he was released after the team signed defensive end Jeff Charleston. He was re-signed four days later when defensive tackle Montavious Stanley was placed on injured reserve. He was cut again on October 26, to activate suspended guard Jamar Nesbit.

=== Baltimore Ravens ===
On October 29, 2008, he was signed by the Baltimore Ravens after wide receiver Demetrius Williams was placed on the injured reserve list. He appeared in 2 games and was declared inactive in 7 contests.

=== Kansas City Chiefs ===
On March 17, 2009, he signed with the Kansas City Chiefs. He was second on the team with 16 special teams tackles. He was re-signed on March 7, 2010.

In 2011, he had a catch drought that started after he had one reception in Week 5 against the Indianapolis Colts and ended in Week 13 against the Chicago Bears. In week 16 against the Oakland Raiders, he played an important role catching three passes for 61 yards (including a 43-yard gain). He finished the season with 8 receptions for 114 yards.

In 2012, he appeared in 15 games and was placed on the injured reserve list on December 29. He was released on August 25, 2013.

== Personal life ==
He is married to Kandy Copper and they have 3 children, Terrance Jr, Taniya and Tyreek. Terrance Jr played at his father's alma mater, East Carolina University and Tyreek is a class of 2026 Wide Receiver committed to NC State.
