= Broncos–Chargers rivalry =

National Football League rivalry

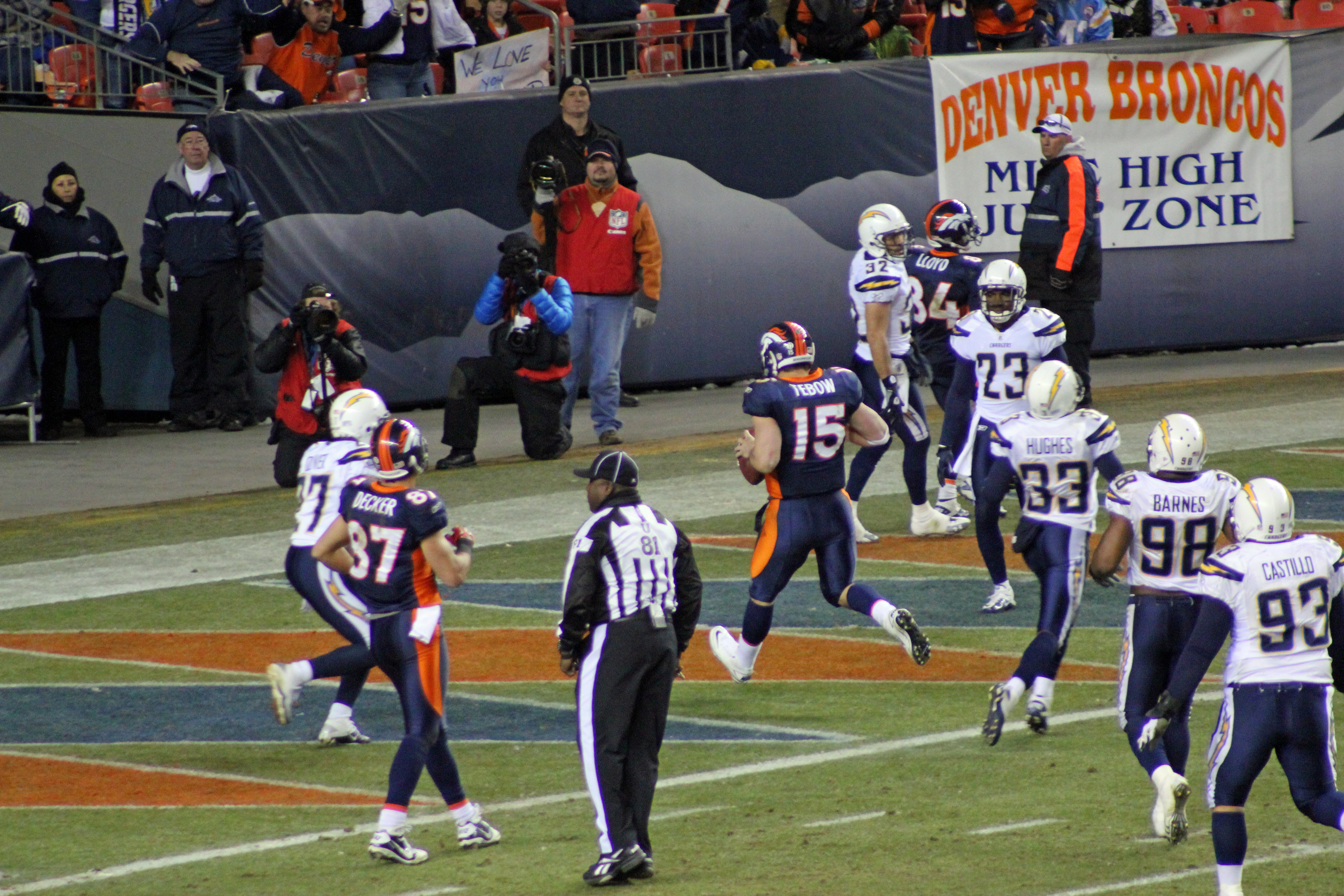
- Broncos and Chargers face off during the 2010 season.

- Denver Broncos Los Angeles Chargers
- Location: Denver, Los Angeles
- First meeting: October 16, 1960; Chargers 23, Broncos 19
- Latest meeting: October 11, 2026; Broncos 23, Chargers 17
- Next meeting: January 9/10, 2027
- Stadiums: Broncos: Empower Field at Mile High; Chargers: SoFi Stadium

Statistics
- Total meetings: 134
- All-time series: Broncos: 75–58–1
- Regular season series: Broncos: 74–58–1
- Postseason results: Broncos: 1–0
- Largest victory: Broncos: 38–3 (1997); Chargers: 58–20 (1963), 41–3 (2007)
- Most points scored: Broncos: 50 (1963); Chargers: 58 (1963)
- Longest win streak: Broncos: 7 (1975–1978); Chargers: 6 (1963–1966)
- Current win streak: Broncos: 2 (2025–present)

Post-season history
- 2013 AFC Divisional: Broncos won: 24–17

The Broncos–Chargers rivalry is a National Football League (NFL) rivalry between the Denver Broncos and Los Angeles Chargers.

Since the American Football League was established in 1960, the Broncos and Chargers have shared the same division, the first being the AFL Western Conference. Since the AFL–NFL merger, both clubs have competed in the American Football Conference (AFC) West division.

The Broncos lead the overall series, 75–58–1. The two teams have met once in the playoffs, with the Broncos holding a 1–0 record.

== Notable moments ==
=== 1985–2006 ===
- November 17, 1985: Broncos' safety Dennis Smith blocked two straight field goal attempts in overtime after the Chargers had advanced the football to the Broncos' 23-yard line in the first overtime possession. On 4th and 4 from the Broncos' 23, Smith blocked Bob Thomas' initial field goal attempt, only to have it negated due to a timeout being called by teammate Mike Harden before the kick. Following the timeout, Thomas attempted a second kick; this was also blocked by Smith and returned by Louis Wright for a 60-yard touchdown for a 30–24 Broncos' overtime win at Mile High Stadium.
- September 4, 1994: The Broncos jumped out to a 24–6 lead at Mile High Stadium on the Chargers in the second quarter, however, the Chargers responded, and took a 27–24 lead at half time, after safety Stanley Richard returned a John Elway interception 99 yards for a touchdown just before halftime. The Chargers later sealed the victory after linebacker Junior Seau recovered a fumble by Elway in the game's closing seconds.
- September 14, 2003: The Broncos routed the Chargers 37–13 at Qualcomm Stadium. However, the game is notable for a uniform mix-up, in which the Broncos came to the stadium in their road white jerseys, when the host Chargers were planning to wear white, and were supposed to be the team that declared their uniform color. The Broncos were fined $25,000 as a result, and when the two teams met at Invesco Field at Mile High later that season in Week 11 (November 16), the NFL allowed the Chargers to choose their uniform color in advance. They chose navy blue, forcing the Broncos to wear their white jerseys at home for the first time since 1983.
- December 10, 2006: The Chargers routed the Broncos 48–20 at Qualcomm Stadium, in which Chargers' running back LaDainian Tomlinson set a new NFL record for touchdowns in a single season, with 28.

=== 2007–2011 ===
- December 24, 2007: In the fourth quarter of a Monday night game at Qualcomm Stadium, Broncos' quarterback Jay Cutler was involved in a verbal scuffle with Chargers' quarterback Philip Rivers and linebacker Matt Wilhelm, with Rivers taunting Cutler and Wilhelm mocking a "waving" gesture. Broncos' cornerback Champ Bailey took exception to Rivers' taunting of Cutler.
- September 14, 2008: With 52 seconds left in the fourth quarter, the Chargers were leading 38–31 in Denver. The Broncos hiked the ball on 2nd-and-goal from the Chargers' 1-yard line. Jay Cutler rolled out to the right and fumbled the football before he brought his arm forward, which was recovered by Chargers' linebacker Tim Dobbins. However, referee Ed Hochuli called the play dead as he believed it to be an incomplete pass, so the ball was returned to the Broncos at the 10-yard line (the spot where the ball hit the ground). Two plays later, on 4th-and-goal from the 4, Cutler threw a touchdown pass to wide receiver Eddie Royal to make the score 38–37. Instead of kicking an extra point to tie the game and send it to overtime, Broncos' head coach Mike Shanahan opted for a 2-point conversion. Cutler completed the conversion with another pass to Royal, giving the Broncos a 39–38 victory.
- December 28, 2008: The Broncos and Chargers met in the 2008 regular-season finale in San Diego, with the winner clinching the AFC West title. Three weeks earlier, the Broncos were 8–5 and the Chargers were 5–8, with the Broncos losing their next two games and the Chargers winning their next two to pull to within one game of the Broncos for the division lead. Three and a half months after the aforementioned controversial Broncos' win in Denver, the Chargers exacted revenge, with an emphatic 52–21 win that not only completed a monumental Broncos' season-ending collapse but also denied the Broncos a playoff berth. The two teams finished the 2008 season tied for first place in the AFC West, each with an 8–8 record; however, the Chargers won the division based on a better record against AFC West divisional opponents (5–1 to the Broncos' 3–3). This was also Mike Shanahan's last game as the Broncos' head coach, as he was fired two days later after 14 seasons.
- November 27, 2011: Quarterback Tim Tebow led the Broncos to a 16–13 win at Qualcomm Stadium in overtime, with kicker Matt Prater nailing a 37-yard field goal with 29 seconds left. Earlier in overtime, the Broncos blocked a 53-yard attempt by Chargers' kicker Nick Novak, however, Broncos' head coach John Fox called a timeout before the kick. Novak subsequently missed the second attempt.

=== 2012–present ===
- October 15, 2012: Trailing 24–0 at halftime after back-to-back special teams turnovers and an interception returned for a touchdown, quarterback Peyton Manning led the Broncos to a stunning 35–24 comeback win in San Diego. Three second-half interceptions and two lost fumbles by Chargers' quarterback Philip Rivers swung the momentum toward the Broncos' favor, as Manning and the Broncos capitalized on each Chargers' mistake. Manning went 13/14 for 167 yards and three touchdowns in the second half, hitting Demaryius Thomas on a 29-yard score with 10:56 left in the third quarter to get the Broncos on the scoreboard. Following a 65-yard touchdown on a fumble recovery by cornerback Tony Carter, the Broncos suddenly found themselves down only 10 as the Chargers watched their comfortable halftime lead dwindle. Manning added two more touchdown passes in the fourth quarter, finding Eric Decker on a 7-yard score and then connecting with Brandon Stokley on a 21-yard pitch and catch to give the Broncos a 28–24 lead with 9:03 left. Cornerback Chris Harris, Jr. sealed the comeback with a 46-yard interception return to put the Broncos up 35–24 with 2:06 left. The defense added one final takeaway as Rivers fumbled in the game's final minute to end what was certainly an instant Monday Night Football classic.
- January 12, 2014: In the first and only postseason meeting in the history of the rivalry, Denver defeated the Chargers in the AFC Divisional Round 24–17 to advance to the franchise's first AFC Championship Game since the 2005 season. This was Peyton Manning's first of five playoff wins with the Broncos, as well as his first career playoff victory outside of Indianapolis. The Broncos, who honed a historically record-setting offense throughout the 2013 season, would go on to emerge victorious the following week in the AFC Championship Game by a score of 26–16 over the New England Patriots and advance to Super Bowl XLVIII, where they fell to the Seattle Seahawks 43–8.
- September 11, 2017: The Chargers were attempting a game-tying 44-yard field goal at Sports Authority Field at Mile High with five seconds left in the game, after trailing 24–7 to begin the fourth quarter. However, Chargers' placekicker Younghoe Koo's field goal attempt was blocked by Broncos' defensive end Shelby Harris for a Broncos' 24–21 win. Koo's initial field goal attempt was good, but it was nullified as the result of Broncos' head coach Vance Joseph calling a timeout to ice the kicker, forcing a second attempt.
- October 22, 2017: The Chargers shut out the Broncos by a score of 21–0. This was the Broncos' first shutout loss in 25 years, since the 1992 season. Chargers' wide receiver Travis Benjamin was instrumental in the victory with a 65-yard punt return for a touchdown and a 42-yard touchdown catch.
- November 18, 2018: The Chargers were leading 19–7 in the third quarter at StubHub Center, and were threatening to pull away from the Broncos. However, linebacker Von Miller swung the momentum in the Broncos' favor, with an interception of a screen pass by Chargers' quarterback Philip Rivers, returning the football 40 yards to the Chargers' 18-yard line. This set up a 3-yard touchdown run by running back Royce Freeman to pull the Broncos to within a 19–14 deficit. Following a 2-yard touchdown by running back Phillip Lindsay (with an unsuccessful two-point attempt) and a go-ahead 30-yard field goal by Chargers' placekicker Michael Badgley, Broncos' quarterback Case Keenum engineered a game-winning drive, culminating in a 34-yard field goal by placekicker Brandon McManus as time expired, for a 23–22 Broncos' victory.
- December 1, 2019: After a 46-yard field goal by Chargers' placekicker Michael Badgley tied the score at 20–20 with only 14 seconds remaining at Empower Field at Mile High, the game appeared to be headed to overtime. However, instead of a kneel-down, Broncos' rookie quarterback Drew Lock, in his NFL debut, launched a deep pass attempt to wide receiver Courtland Sutton, who drew a pass interference penalty on cornerback Casey Hayward at the Chargers' 35-yard line. This set up Broncos' placekicker Brandon McManus with the game-winning 53-yard field goal as time expired.
- November 1, 2020: The Broncos trailed 24–3 in front of limited capacity at Empower Field at Mile High, and were stymied by the Chargers' defense in the first half. Entering the third quarter, the Broncos had scored only two touchdowns in the previous ten quarters. However, running back Phillip Lindsay ignited a rally with a 55-yard touchdown run, and quarterback Drew Lock threw a 9-yard touchdown pass to tight end Albert Okwuegbunam to draw the Broncos to within a 24–17 deficit early in the fourth quarter. After Lock's second touchdown pass—a 40-yarder to wide receiver DaeSean Hamilton, coupled with two field goals by Chargers' placekicker Michael Badgley, the Broncos trailed 30–24 with 2:34 remaining in the game. The Broncos began their game-winning drive at their own 19-yard line. Following a pass interference penalty on Chargers' cornerback Brandon Facyson in the end zone on 4th-and-4 with one second remaining, Lock connected on a 1-yard touchdown pass to wide receiver K. J. Hamler as time expired, coupled with placekicker Brandon McManus kicking the subsequent game-winning extra point.
- December 27, 2020: The Chargers and Broncos had their first matchup at SoFi Stadium. The Chargers, led by Justin Herbert, won the game 19–16, as kicker Michael Badgley converted a 37-yard field goal with 41 seconds remaining and the Chargers' defense intercepted the Broncos' last-second Hail Mary pass.

== Season-by-season results ==
Denver Broncos vs. San Diego/Los Angeles Chargers Season-by-Season Results
1960s (Chargers, 15–5)

| Season | Season series | at Denver Broncos | at Los Angeles/San Diego Chargers | Overall series | Notes |
|---|---|---|---|---|---|
| 1960 | Chargers 2–0 | Chargers; 23–19 | Chargers; 41–33 | Chargers; 2–0 | Inaugural season for both franchises and the American Football League (AFL). The Broncos and Chargers were placed in the AFL Western Division, resulting in two meetings annually. Last season until the 2017 season the Chargers played as a Los Angeles-based franchise. Chargers lose 1960 AFL Championship. |
| 1961 | Chargers 2–0 | Chargers; 19–16 | Chargers; 37–0 | Chargers; 4–0 | Chargers relocate to San Diego. Chargers lose 1961 AFL Championship. |
| 1962 | Broncos 2–0 | Broncos; 30–21 | Broncos; 23–20 | Chargers; 4–2 | |
| 1963 | Tie 1–1 | Broncos; 50–34 | Chargers; 58–20 | Chargers; 5–3 | In Denver, the Broncos scored their most points in a game against the Chargers and set a franchise record for most points scored in a game (broken in 2013). In San Diego, the Chargers record their largest victory against the Broncos with a 38-point differential, score their most points in a game against the Broncos, and set a franchise record for their most points scored in a game. Chargers win 1963 AFL Championship. |
| 1964 | Chargers 2–0 | Chargers; 31–20 | Chargers; 42–14 | Chargers; 7–3 | Chargers lose 1964 AFL Championship. |
| 1965 | Chargers 2–0 | Chargers; 35–21 | Chargers; 34–31 | Chargers; 9–3 | Chargers lose 1965 AFL Championship. |
| 1966 | Tie 1–1 | Broncos; 20–17 | Chargers; 24–17 | Chargers; 10–4 | Last matchup at Balboa Stadium. |
| 1967 | Chargers 2–0 | Chargers; 38–21 | Chargers; 24–20 | Chargers; 12–4 | Chargers open San Diego Stadium. Game in San Diego was played on Thanksgiving. |
| 1968 | Chargers 2–0 | Chargers; 47–23 | Chargers; 55–24 | Chargers; 14–4 | |
| 1969 | Tie 1–1 | Broncos; 13–0 | Chargers; 45–24 | Chargers; 15–5 | |

1970s (Broncos, 13–6–1)

| Season | Season series | at Denver Broncos | at San Diego Chargers | Overall series | Notes |
|---|---|---|---|---|---|
| 1970 | Chargers 1–0–1 | Tie; 17–17 | Chargers; 24–21 | Chargers; 16–5–1 | As a result of the AFL–NFL merger, the Broncos and Chargers are placed in the AFC West. |
| 1971 | Tie 1–1 | Broncos; 20–16 | Chargers; 45–17 | Chargers; 17–6–1 | |
| 1972 | Tie 1–1 | Broncos; 38–13 | Chargers; 37–14 | Chargers; 18–7–1 | Chargers win 9 straight home games (1963–1972). |
| 1973 | Broncos 2–0 | Broncos; 30–19 | Broncos; 42–28 | Chargers; 18–9–1 | The Broncos' first season series sweep against the Chargers since the 1962 season. |
| 1974 | Tie 1–1 | Broncos; 27–7 | Chargers; 17–0 | Chargers; 19–10–1 | |
| 1975 | Broncos 2–0 | Broncos; 13–10 (OT) | Broncos; 27–17 | Chargers; 19–12–1 | |
| 1976 | Broncos 2–0 | Broncos; 26–0 | Broncos; 17–0 | Chargers; 19–14–1 | |
| 1977 | Broncos 2–0 | Broncos; 17–9 | Broncos; 17–14 | Chargers; 19–16–1 | Broncos lose Super Bowl XII. |
| 1978 | Tie 1–1 | Broncos; 27–14 | Chargers; 23–0 | Chargers; 20–17–1 | |
| 1979 | Tie 1–1 | Broncos; 7–0 | Chargers; 17–7 | Chargers; 21–18–1 | The Broncos win nine straight home games (1971–1979). |

1980s (Broncos, 12–8)

| Season | Season series | at Denver Broncos | at San Diego Chargers | Overall series | Notes |
|---|---|---|---|---|---|
| 1980 | Tie 1–1 | Chargers; 30–13 | Broncos; 20–13 | Chargers; 22–19–1 | |
| 1981 | Tie 1–1 | Broncos; 42–24 | Chargers; 34–17 | Chargers; 23–20–1 | Both teams finished with 10–6 records, but the Chargers clinched the AFC West based on a better division record, eliminating the Broncos from playoff contention. |
| 1982 | Chargers 2–0 | Chargers; 23–3 | Chargers; 30–20 | Chargers; 25–20–1 | Both meetings were played despite the players' strike which reduced the season to 9 games. The Chargers' first season series sweep against the Broncos since the 1968 season. |
| 1983 | Tie 1–1 | Broncos; 14–6 | Chargers; 31–7 | Chargers; 26–21–1 | |
| 1984 | Broncos 2–0 | Broncos; 16–13 | Broncos; 16–13 | Chargers; 26–23–1 | |
| 1985 | Tie 1–1 | Broncos; 30–24 (OT) | Chargers; 30–10 | Chargers; 27–24–1 | In Denver, the Broncos block a potential Chargers' game-winning field goal and return it for a touchdown to win the game. |
| 1986 | Tie 1–1 | Chargers; 9–3 | Broncos; 31–14 | Chargers; 28–25–1 | Chargers' win was the Broncos' only home loss in the 1986 season. Broncos lose Super Bowl XXI. |
| 1987 | Broncos 2–0 | Broncos; 24–0 | Broncos; 31–17 | Chargers; 28–27–1 | Broncos lose Super Bowl XXII. |
| 1988 | Broncos 2–0 | Broncos; 34–3 | Broncos; 12–0 | Broncos; 29–28–1 | |
| 1989 | Tie 1–1 | Broncos; 16–10 | Chargers; 19–16 | Broncos; 30–29–1 | Broncos lose Super Bowl XXIV. |

1990s (Broncos, 13–7)

| Season | Season series | at Denver Broncos | at San Diego Chargers | Overall series | Notes |
|---|---|---|---|---|---|
| 1990 | Tie 1–1 | Broncos; 20–10 | Chargers; 19–7 | Broncos; 31–30–1 | |
| 1991 | Broncos 2–0 | Broncos; 27–19 | Broncos; 17–14 | Broncos; 33–30–1 | |
| 1992 | Tie 1–1 | Broncos; 21–13 | Chargers; 24–21 | Broncos; 34–31–1 | |
| 1993 | Tie 1–1 | Broncos; 34–17 | Chargers; 13–10 | Broncos; 35–32–1 | |
| 1994 | Tie 1–1 | Chargers; 37–34 | Broncos; 20–15 | Broncos; 36–33–1 | In Denver, Chargers overcame a 24–6 deficit. Broncos' win handed the Chargers their first loss of the season after a 6–0 start. Chargers lose Super Bowl XXIX. |
| 1995 | Tie 1–1 | Broncos; 30–27 | Chargers; 17–6 | Broncos; 37–34–1 | |
| 1996 | Tie 1–1 | Chargers; 28–17 | Broncos; 16–10 | Broncos; 38–35–1 | In Denver, Broncos overcame a 17–0 deficit. |
| 1997 | Broncos 2–0 | Broncos; 38–3 | Broncos; 38–28 | Broncos; 40–35–1 | In Denver, the Broncos record their largest victory against the Chargers with a 35-point differential. Broncos win Super Bowl XXXII. |
| 1998 | Broncos 2–0 | Broncos; 27–10 | Broncos; 31–16 | Broncos; 42–35–1 | Broncos win Super Bowl XXXIII. |
| 1999 | Tie 1–1 | Chargers; 12–6 | Broncos; 33–17 | Broncos; 43–36–1 | |

2000s (Broncos, 11–9)

| Season | Season series | at Denver Broncos | at San Diego Chargers | Overall series | Notes |
|---|---|---|---|---|---|
| 2000 | Broncos 2–0 | Broncos; 38–37 | Broncos; 21–7 | Broncos; 45–36–1 | In Denver, Broncos overcame a 34–17 fourth quarter deficit. Last matchup at the Mile High Stadium. |
| 2001 | Tie 1–1 | Broncos; 26–16 | Chargers; 27–10 | Broncos; 46–37–1 | Broncos open Invesco Field at Mile High (now known as Empower Field at Mile High). |
| 2002 | Tie 1–1 | Broncos; 26–9 | Chargers; 30–27 (OT) | Broncos; 47–38–1 | |
| 2003 | Broncos 2–0 | Broncos; 37–8 | Broncos; 37–13 | Broncos; 49–38–1 | In San Diego, the Broncos accidentally brought their wrong jerseys, the white jerseys, to the game when the Chargers opted to wear their white jerseys. As punishment, the NFL allowed the Chargers to choose their uniform color for their matchup in Denver, and they chose navy blue, forcing the Broncos to wear their white jerseys at home for the first time since the 1983 season. |
| 2004 | Tie 1–1 | Broncos; 23–13 | Chargers; 20–17 | Broncos; 50–39–1 | |
| 2005 | Broncos 2–0 | Broncos; 20–17 | Broncos; 23–7 | Broncos; 52–39–1 | |
| 2006 | Chargers 2–0 | Chargers; 35–27 | Chargers; 48–20 | Broncos; 52–41–1 | In Denver, Chargers overcame a 24–7 second half deficit. Chargers' first season series sweep against the Broncos since the 1982 season. |
| 2007 | Chargers 2–0 | Chargers; 41–3 | Chargers; 23–3 | Broncos; 52–43–1 | In Denver, the Chargers tied their largest victory against the Broncos with a 38–point differential (1963). |
| 2008 | Tie 1–1 | Broncos; 39–38 | Chargers; 52–21 | Broncos; 53–44–1 | In Denver, referee Ed Hochuli made an incorrect call that helped the Broncos beat the Chargers. The Chargers' victory clinched them the AFC West and eliminated the Broncos from playoff contention. Both teams finished with 8–8 records, but the Chargers clinched the AFC West based on a better division record. |
| 2009 | Tie 1–1 | Chargers; 32–3 | Broncos; 34–23 | Broncos; 54–45–1 | Chargers’ loss to the Broncos was their final defeat of the 2009 regular season, as they went on to win 11 straight games. |

2010s (Broncos, 14–7)

| Season | Season series | at Denver Broncos | at San Diego/Los Angeles Chargers | Overall series | Notes |
|---|---|---|---|---|---|
| 2010 | Chargers 2–0 | Chargers; 33–28 | Chargers; 35–14 | Broncos; 54–47–1 | |
| 2011 | Tie 1–1 | Chargers; 29–24 | Broncos; 16–13 (OT) | Broncos; 55–48–1 | Both teams finish with 8–8 records, but the Broncos clinch the AFC West based on a better record versus common opponents. |
| 2012 | Broncos 2–0 | Broncos; 30–23 | Broncos; 35–24 | Broncos; 57–48–1 | In San Diego, the Broncos overcame a 24–0 halftime deficit. The 24-point comeback tied a Broncos franchise record for largest comeback while the 24-point blown lead tied a Chargers franchise record for biggest blown lead (broken in 2023). That win marked the beginning of an 11-game winning streak to end the regular season. |
| 2013 | Tie 1–1 | Chargers; 27–20 | Broncos; 28–20 | Broncos; 58–49–1 | Chargers' win was the Broncos' only home loss in the 2013 season. |
| 2013 Playoffs | Broncos 1–0 | Broncos; 24–17 | —N/a | Broncos; 59–49–1 | AFC Divisional Playoff game. Broncos go on to lose Super Bowl XLVIII. |
| 2014 | Broncos 2–0 | Broncos; 35–21 | Broncos; 22–10 | Broncos; 61–49–1 | |
| 2015 | Broncos 2–0 | Broncos; 27–20 | Broncos; 17–3 | Broncos; 63–49–1 | In San Diego, the Broncos' win extended their road division game winning streak to 15, an NFL record. In Denver, the Broncos clinch the AFC West, a first-round bye, and home-field advantage throughout the AFC playoffs as the #1 seed with their win and New England's loss to the Miami Dolphins. Broncos win Super Bowl 50. |
| 2016 | Tie 1–1 | Broncos; 27–19 | Chargers; 21–13 | Broncos; 64–50–1 | The final season the Chargers played as a San Diego-based team. Chargers' win snapped the Broncos' NFL record 15-game road division winning streak. |
| 2017 | Tie 1–1 | Broncos; 24–21 | Chargers; 21–0 | Broncos; 65–51–1 | Chargers relocate back to Los Angeles. In Denver, Broncos block game-tying field goal attempt at the end of regulation to hold on for the win. The Chargers' shutout win gave the Broncos their first shutout loss since the 1992 season. |
| 2018 | Tie 1–1 | Chargers; 23–9 | Broncos; 23–22 | Broncos; 66–52–1 | In Los Angeles, Broncos' K Brandon McManus kicked the game-winning field goal as time expired. |
| 2019 | Broncos 2–0 | Broncos; 23–20 | Broncos; 20–13 | Broncos; 68–52–1 | In Denver, Brandon McManus kicked the game-winning field goal as time expired. |

2020s (Broncos, 7–6)

| Season | Season series | at Denver Broncos | at Los Angeles Chargers | Overall series | Notes |
|---|---|---|---|---|---|
| 2020 | Tie 1–1 | Broncos; 31–30 | Chargers; 19–16 | Broncos; 69–53–1 | Chargers open SoFi Stadium. In Denver, the Broncos overcame a 24–3 second half deficit as QB Drew Lock threw the game-winning touchdown as time expired. |
| 2021 | Tie 1–1 | Broncos; 28–13 | Chargers; 34–13 | Broncos; 70–54–1 | |
| 2022 | Tie 1–1 | Broncos; 31–28 | Chargers; 19–16 (OT) | Broncos; 71–55–1 | |
| 2023 | Broncos 2–0 | Broncos; 16−9 | Broncos; 24–7 | Broncos; 73–55–1 | |
| 2024 | Chargers 2–0 | Chargers; 23–16 | Chargers; 34–27 | Broncos; 73–57–1 | In Los Angeles, Chargers' K Cameron Dicker kicked a 57-yard fair catch kick, making the first successful attempt since Chargers' K Ray Wersching in the 1976 season, and the longest successful fair catch kick in NFL history. Chargers' first season series sweep against the Broncos since the 2010 season and the first in L.A. since 1960. |
| 2025 | Tie 1–1 | Broncos; 19−3 | Chargers; 23–20 | Broncos; 74–58–1 | Broncos clinch the #1 seed in the AFC with their win. |
| 2026 | Broncos 1–0 | January 9/10 | Broncos; 23–17 | Broncos; 75–58–1 | |

Summary of Results

| Season | Season series | at Denver Broncos | at San Diego/Los Angeles Chargers | Notes |
|---|---|---|---|---|
| AFL regular season | Chargers 15–5 | Chargers 6–4 | Chargers 9–1 | |
| NFL regular season | Broncos 69–43–1 | Broncos 41–14–1 | Chargers 29–28 | |
| AFL and NFL regular season | Broncos 74–58–1 | Broncos 45–20–1 | Chargers 38–29 | |
| NFL postseason | Broncos 1–0 | Broncos 1–0 | no games | AFC Divisional: 2013 |
| Regular and postseason | Broncos 75–58–1 | Broncos 46–20–1 | Chargers 38–29 | Chargers have a 31–25 record in San Diego and currently have a 7–4 record in Los Angeles. |

== Connections between the teams ==
=== Coaches ===
| Name | Broncos' tenure | Chargers' tenure |
|---|---|---|
| Craig Aukerman | Defensive assistant, 2010 | Assistant Special Teams coach, 2013–2016 |
| Clancy Barone | Tight ends coach, 2009, 2011–2014; Offensive line coach, 2010, 2015–2016 | Tight ends coach, 2007–2008 |
| Tim Brewster | Tight ends coach, 2005–2006 | Tight ends coach, 2002–2004; Assistant head coach, 2004 |
| Jeff Davidson | Guard, 1990–1993; Offensive line coach, 2017 | Offensive line coach, 2016 |
| John Fox | Head coach, 2011–2014 | Secondary coach, 1992–1993 |
| Alex Gibbs | Offensive line coach, 1984–1987; Assistant head coach/Offensive line coach, 1995–2003; Offensive line consultant, 2013 | Offensive line coach, 1990–1991 |
| Anthony Lynn | Running back, 1993, 1997–1999; Assistant special teams coach, 2000–2002 | Head coach, 2017–2020 |
| Mike McCoy | Offensive coordinator, 2009–2012, 2017 | Head coach, 2013–2016 |
| Ron Milus | Secondary coach, 2000–2002 and 2011–2012 | Secondary coach, 2013–present |
| Mike Nolan | Special teams coach, 1987–1988; Linebackers coach, 1989–1992; Defensive coordinator, 2009 | Linebackers coach, 2015 |
| Wayne Nunnely | Defensive line coach, 2009–2011 | Defensive line coach, 1997–2008 |
| John Pagano | Outside linebackers coach, 2020–present | Defensive assistant, 2002; Linebackers coach, 2003–2011; Defensive coordinator, 2012–2016 |
| Dwain Painter | Offensive assistant, 1997 | Quarterbacks coach, 1994–1996 |
| Wade Phillips | Defensive coordinator, 1989–1992, 2015–16; Head coach, 1993–1994 | Defensive coordinator, 2004–2006 |
| Greg Williams | Defensive backs coach, 2018 | Assistant defensive backs coach, 2013–2015 |
| Joe Lombardi | Offensive Coordinator, 2023–present | Offensive Coordinator, 2021-2022 |

=== Players ===
| Name | Position(s) | Broncos' tenure | Chargers' tenure |
|---|---|---|---|
| Stephen Alexander | Tight end | 2005–2007 | 2002–2003 |
| Jeremiah Attaochu | Linebacker | 2019–2020 | 2014–2017, 2022 |
| David Binn | Long snapper | 2011 (one game) | 1994–2010 |
| Marco Coleman | Defensive end | 2004–2005 | 1996–1998 |
| David Diaz-Infante | Center/Guard | 1996–1998 | 1987 |
| Dedrick Dodge | Safety | 1997 | 1998 |
| Orlando Franklin | Guard | 2011–2014 | 2015–2016 |
| Melvin Gordon | Running back | 2020–2022 | 2015–2019 |
| Virgil Green | Tight end | 2011–2017 | 2018–2020 |
| Chris Harris Jr. | Cornerback | 2011–2019 | 2020–2021 |
| Jacob Hester | Fullback | 2012 | 2008–2011 |
| Quentin Jammer | Cornerback/Safety | 2013 | 2002–2012 |
| Marlon McCree | Safety | 2008 | 2006–2007 |
| Anthony Miller | Wide receiver | 1994–1996 | 1988–1993 |
| Russell Okung | Offensive tackle | 2016 | 2017–2019 |
| Shaun Phillips | Defensive end | 2013 | 2004–2012 |
| Adrian Robinson | Linebacker | 2013 (six games) | 2013 (three games) |
| Dante Rosario | Tight end | 2011 | 2012 |
| Eddie Royal | Wide receiver/Return specialist | 2008–2011 | 2012–2014 |
| Neil Smith | Defensive end | 1997–1999 | 2000 |
| Jimmy Spencer | Cornerback | 2000–2003 (Note: Jimmy Spencer also worked as an assistant defensive backs coach with the Broncos in addition to playing during the 2003 season.) | 1998–1999 |
| Harry Swayne | Offensive tackle | 1997–1998 | 1991–1996 |
| Maa Tanuvasa | Defensive tackle | 1995–2000 | 2001 |
| Mitch Unrein | Defensive tackle | 2011–2014 | 2015 |
| Louis Vasquez | Guard | 2013–2015 | 2009–2012 |
| J. D. Walton | Center | 2010–2013 | 2015 |
| Wes Welker | Wide receiver/Return specialist | 2013–2014 | 2004 (one game) |
| Jamal Williams | Nose tackle | 2010 | 1998–2009 |

== Series leaders ==
Statistics are limited to Chargers-Broncos regular season games. Correct through 2023 season.

| | Broncos | Chargers | Ref |
|---|---|---|---|
| Passing yards | John Elway – 6,548 | Philip Rivers – 6,732 | |
| Rushing yards | Floyd Little – 843 | LaDainian Tomlinson – 1,487 | |
| Receiving yards | Rod Smith – 1,400 | Charlie Joiner – 1,324 | |
| Touchdowns | Shannon Sharpe – 13 | LaDainian Tomlinson – 20 | |
| Sacks | Von Miller – 16 | Leslie O'Neal – 11 1/2 | |
| Interceptions | Steve Foley – 8 | Joe Beauchamp – 10 | |

== See also ==
- National Football League rivalries
- AFC West
