= Novak =

Novak (in Serbo-Croatian and Slovene; Cyrillic: Новак) and Novák (in Hungarian, Czech and Slovak; feminine: Nováková) is a surname and masculine given name, derived from the Slavic word for 'new' (e.g. Czech: nový, Serbo-Croatian: nov / нов), which usually translates as 'novice', 'new man', 'newcomer'.

In most languages, the stress is on the first syllable of the word. An exception is Slovene, which places stress on the second syllable instead.

It is the most common surname in the Czech Republic, and Slovenia, and the sixth most common in Croatia. It is also found in Romania and Moldova, in the Novac form, and among Ashkenazi Jews in various forms depending on their country of origin.

== Spelling ==
The surname is usually spelled Novak (Cyrillic: Новак) in Serbo-Croatian and Slovene, and Novák in Czech, Slovak and Hungarian. The Polish counterpart is Nowak.

== In specific countries ==
Novák is widespread in the Czech Republic and Slovakia. In both countries, the feminine form is Nováková. It is the most common surname in the Czech Republic.

Novak is the most common surname in Slovenia with more than 11,000 sharing it. There are however significant variations between regions: it is very common in central Slovenia (in the regions around Ljubljana and Celje), as well as in parts of southern Slovenia and eastern Slovenia (Lower Carniola, Prekmurje). It is much less common in northern and western Slovenia; in the Goriška region on the border with Italy, it is quite rare.

In Croatia, Novak is the sixth most common surname.

== Surname bearers ==
=== Arts ===
- B. J. Novak (born 1979), American writer, comedian and actor
- Brett Novak, American filmmaker and director
- Dávid Novák, 18th-century Hungarian poet
- Evelin Novak (born 1965), Croatian operatic soprano
- Gabi Novak (1936–2025), Croatian pop singer
- Gary Novak (born 1969), American session drummer
- Jan Novák (composer) (1921–1984), Czech composer of classical music
- Jan Novák (writer) (born 1953), Czech writer and playwright
- Jana Nováková (actress) (1948–1968), Czech film actress and model
- Jane Novak (1896–1990), American actress
- Jim Novak (1955–2018), American comic book letterer
- Johann Baptist Novak (1756–1833), Slovenian composer
- John Novak (actor) (born 1955), Venezuelan-Canadian actor
- Kate Novak, American fantasy writer
- Kayvan Novak (born 1978), British-Iranian actor
- Kim Novak (born 1933), American actress
- Kristýna Badinková Nováková (born 1983), Czech actress
- Laila Novak (born 1942), Swedish model and actress
- Marzenka Novak (1945–2011), Argentine actress
- Mel Novak (1934–2025), American actor
- Mirjam Novak (born 1981), German actress and screenwriter
- Petr Novák (musician) (1945–1997), Czech rock musician
- Slobodan Novak (1924–2016), Croatian writer
- Teréza Nováková (1853–1912), Czech feminist author, editor and ethnographer
- Vilmos Aba-Novák (1894–1941), Hungarian painter and graphic artist
- Vítězslav Novák (1870–1949), Czech composer
- Vjenceslav Novak (1859–1905), Croatian writer
- Vladimír Novák (painter) (1947–2024), Czech painter

=== Sports ===
- Anatole Novak (1937–2022), French bicycle racer
- Andrew Novak (born 1995), American golfer
- Andriy Novak (born 1988), Ukrainian footballer
- Anthony Novak (born 1994), Canadian soccer player
- Brandon Novak (born 1978), American skateboarder
- David Novák (born 1979), Czech footballer
- Dennis Novak (born 1993), Austrian tennis player
- Dezső Novák (1939–2014), Hungarian footballer
- Doug Novak, American basketball coach
- Džoni Novak (born 1969), Slovenian footballer
- Emil Novák (born 1989), Czech snowboarder
- Éva Novák-Gerard (1930–2005), Hungarian swimmer
- Ferenc Novák (born 1969), Hungarian canoer
- Filip Novák (ice hockey) (born 1982), Czech ice hockey player
- Filip Novák (footballer) (born 1990), Czech footballer
- Grigory Novak (1919–1980), Ukrainian weightlifter
- Ilona Novák (1925–2019), Hungarian swimmer
- Ivana Nováková (born 1965), Czech basketball player
- Ján Novák (footballer) (born 1985), Slovak footballer
- Jan Novák (footballer, born 1896) (1896–1968), Czech footballer
- Jan Novak (footballer, born 1997), Slovenian footballer
- Jan Novák (handballer) (born 1960), Czech handball player
- Jan Novák (ice hockey) (born 1979), Czech ice hockey player
- Jana Nováková (footballer) (born 1960), Czech footballer
- Jeff Novak (born 1967), American footballer
- Jiří Novák (born 1975), Czech tennis player
- Joe Novak (born 1945), American football player and coach
- John Novak (rugby union) (born 1947), English rugby union player
- Josef Novák (born 1956), Czech footballer
- Karel Novák, Czech slalom canoeist
- Kevin Novak (born 1982), American soccer player
- Ladislav Novák (1931–2011), Czech football player and manager
- Martin Novák (born 1988), Czech ice hockey player
- Matěj Novák (born 1989), Czech figure skater
- Michael Novak (footballer) (born 1990), Austrian footballer
- Mike Novak (1915–1978), American basketball player
- Nicholas Novak (born 1996), Czech-American skier
- Nick Novak (born 1981), American football placekicker
- Otto Novák (1902–1984), Czech footballer
- Petr Novák (athlete) (born 1975), Czech Paralympic athlete
- Petr Novák (skier) (born 1982), Czech skier
- Petr Novák (ice hockey) (born 1967), Czech ice hockey coach
- Petra Nováková (born 1993), Czech cross-country skier
- Rudolph Novak (1887–1968), Czech-born American gymnast
- Šárka Nováková (born 1971), Czech high jumper
- Soňa Nováková (born 1975), Czech beach volleyball player
- Stan Novak (c. 1924–2006), American basketball player, coach and scout
- Steve Novak (born 1983), basketball player
- Tommy Novak (born 1997), American ice hockey player
- Vladimír Novák (skier) (1904–1986), Czech Nordic skier
- Vratislava Nováková, Czechoslovak slalom canoer
- Zbyněk Novák (born 1983), Czech ice hockey player

=== Other ===
- Alexander Novak (born 1971), Russian politician
- Arne Novák (1880–1939), Czech literary historian and critic
- Augustin Novák (1890–1970), Czech World War I flying ace
- Barbara Novak (born 1929), American art historian
- Dalma Novak, Australian electrical engineer
- David Novak (born 1941), American theologian and philosopher
- David C. Novak (born 1952), American businessman and philanthropist
- David J. Novak (born 1961), American judge
- Dragutin Novak (1892–1978), Croatian aviator
- Előd Novák (born 1980), Hungarian politician
- Eva Nováková (born 1938), Czech politician
- Franz Novak (1913–1983), Austrian SS-Hauptsturmführer
- Grga Novak (1888–1978), Croatian historian, archaeologist and geographer
- John Philip Novak (born 1946), American politician
- Jorge Novak (1928–2001), Argentine bishop
- Joseph D. Novak (1930–2023), American educator
- Katalin Novák (born 1977), Hungarian politician, president of Hungary in 2022–2024
- Ljudmila Novak (born 1959), Slovenian politician
- Michael Novak (1933–2017), American Roman Catholic philosopher and diplomat
- Miroslav Novák (1907–2000), Czech Hussite bishop
- Robert Novak (1931–2009), American journalist, writer and political commentator
- Slobodan Prosperov Novak (born 1951), Croatian literary historian
- Starina Novak (1530–1601), Serbian brigand and rebel
- Štefan Novák (1879–1932), Slovak Greek Catholic bishop
- Tom Novak, American economist and academic
- Viktor Novak (1889–1977), Croat historian
- Viveca Novak, American journalist
- Zdeněk Novák (1891–1988), Czech military officer

== Given name bearers ==
- Novak Djokovic (born 1987), Serbian tennis player
- Novak Grebostrek (fl. 1312), Serbian commander
- Novak Karaljuk (fl. 1404), Serbian commander
- Novak Kilibarda (1934–2023), Montenegrin politician
- Novak Martinović (born 1985), Serbian footballer
- Novak Radonić (1826–1890), Serbian painter
- Novak Roganović (1932–2008), Serbian footballer
- Novak Tomić (1936–2003), Serbian footballer

== Fictional characters ==
- Allie Novak from the Australian drama series Wentworth
- Arpad Novack from a Hungarian play Illatszertár (Parfumerie)
- Billy Novak in the Amazon TV series The Collection
- Bobby Novak from the American TV series Pearson
- Casey Novak from Law & Order: SVU
- Dazzle Novak in the TV series Moonbeam City
- Holland and Dewey Novak from the TV series Eureka Seven
- James Novak from the TV series Scandal
- Jessica Novak, eponymous character of American drama TV series
- Jimmy Novak, his wife Amelia and their daughter Claire, from the TV series Supernatural
- John Novak, protagonist of the TV show Mr. Novak
- Klara Novak from The Shop Around the Corner
- Lindsey Novak in the Stargate Atlantis TV series
- Olivia Novak, character in Canadian series "Street Legal"
- Oscar Novak, main character of the romantic comedy film Three to Tango.
- Pat Novak in The Novak Element in the movie RoboCop
- Pat Novak in the old-time radio program Pat Novak, for Hire
- Sydney Novak in the Netflix series I Am Not Okay With This
- Trishka Novak in the 2011 video game Bulletstorm
- Zig Novak in the TV series Degrassi
