= Novaci =

Novaci can refer to:

- Novaci, Romania, a town in Gorj County, Oltenia, Romania
- Novaci, a village in Mihăilești town, Giurgiu County, Romania
- Novaci, a village in Tuzara Commune, Călăraşi district, Moldova
- Novaci, North Macedonia, a village in North Macedonia

- FK Novaci, a Macedonian football club based on this village

- Novaci Municipality, a municipality in North Macedonia
- Novaci (Aleksandrovac), a village in Aleksandrovac municipality, Serbia
- Novaci (Ub), a village in Ub municipality, Serbia
- Nováci, a 1995 Czech sitcom

== See also ==
- Novac (disambiguation)
- Novak
