= 2013 San Diego Chargers season =

NFL team 54th season

- Owner: Alex Spanos
- General manager: Tom Telesco
- Head coach: Mike McCoy
- Offensive coordinator: Ken Whisenhunt
- Defensive coordinator: John Pagano
- Home stadium: Qualcomm Stadium

Results
- Record: 9–7
- Division place: 3rd AFC West
- Playoffs: Won Wild Card Playoffs (at Bengals) 27–10; Lost Divisional Playoffs (at Broncos) 17–24
- All-Pros: S Eric Weddle (2nd team)
- Pro Bowlers: 2: QB Philip Rivers; S Eric Weddle

The 2013 season was the San Diego Chargers' 44th in the National Football League (NFL), their 54th overall and their first under head coach Mike McCoy. The Chargers finished the regular season with a record of 9–7, improving on their 7–9 record from 2012. Also, they qualified for the playoffs for the first time since 2009. The Chargers defeated the Cincinnati Bengals in the Wild Card round by a score of 27–10, but lost to division rival Denver Broncos in the Divisional round by a score of 24–17. This was the Chargers' final playoff appearance in San Diego. They did not play in the postseason again until 2018, after relocating to Los Angeles.

The new head coach, Mike McCoy, along with offensive coordinator Ken Whisenhunt, completed the Chargers' first winning season since 2010. Only two offensive coaches returned from 2012 in an overhauled coaching staff, and a revamped offensive system had quarterback Philip Rivers release the ball earlier and taking what opposing defenses conceded. Rivers was sacked 30 times, compared to 49 the previous year, and threw for 4,479 yards and 32 touchdowns while tying a career-high with a 105.5 passer rating. San Diego's rushing attack improved from the prior season's 1,461 yards and 3.6 yards per carry—tied for the second worst in the league—to 1,965 yards and a 4-yard average. Although they were speculated to have a poor, disappointing season, and getting off to a shaky start, the Chargers finished in the top eight of the overall standings. Rivers was named NFL Comeback Player of the Year, and Keenan Allen broke out into the national scene as a rookie sensation, breaking multiple wide receiver rookie records. Whisenhunt left at the conclusion of the season to become the head coach of the Titans.

== Signings ==
Pos.	Player	2012 Team	Contract
CB	Derek Cox	Jacksonville Jaguars	4 years, $20 million
DE	Dwight Freeney	Indianapolis Colts	2 years, $8.7 million
TE	John Phillips	Dallas Cowboys	3 years, $5.2 million
OT	King Dunlap	Philadelphia Eagles	2 years, $3.7 million
RB	Danny Woodhead	New England Patriots	2 years, $3.5 million
CB	Richard Marshall	Miami Dolphins	1 year, $855,000
RB	Chris Gronkowski	Denver Broncos	1 year, $630,000
LB	Thomas Keiser	Carolina Panthers	1 year, $555,000

== Re-signings ==
Pos.	Player	Contract
RB	Ronnie Brown	1 year, $1 million

== Departures ==
Pos.	Player	2013 Team
G	Louis Vasquez	Denver Broncos
LB	Antwan Barnes	New York Jets
CB	Antoine Cason	Arizona Cardinals
CB	Quentin Jammer	Denver Broncos
LB	Shaun Phillips	Denver Broncos
WR	Robert Meachem	New Orleans Saints
LB	Takeo Spikes	Retired
LB	Demorrio Williams	
G	Reggie Wells	

== NFL draft ==
2013 San Diego Chargers draft
Round	Pick	Player	Position	College	Notes
1	11	D. J. Fluker	OT	Alabama	
2	38	Manti Te'o	LB	Notre Dame	from Arizona (Note: No. 38: Arizona → San Diego (D). Arizona traded this selection to San Diego in exchange for San Diego's 2013 second- (45th) and fourth- (110th) round selections.)
3	76	Keenan Allen *	WR	California	
5	145	Steve Williams	CB	California	
6	179	Tourek Williams	DE	FIU	
7	221	Brad Sorensen	QB	Southern Utah	
Made roster † Pro Football Hall of Fame * Made at least one Pro Bowl during career

== Staff ==
2013 San Diego Chargers staff
Front office: Owner – Alex Spanos; Chairman/president – Dean Spanos; Executive vice president – Michael Spanos; Executive vice president/CEO – A. G. Spanos; General manager – Tom Telesco; Executive vice president of football operations – John Spanos; Executive vice president of football administration/player finance – Ed McGuire; Senior executive – Randy Mueller; Director of pro scouting – Dennis Abraham; Director of player personnel – JoJo Wooden; Director of college scouting – Kevin Kelly; Assistant director of pro scouting – Bryan Cox; Assistant director of college scouting – Mike Biehl; Head coaches: Head coach – Mike McCoy; Offensive coaches: Offensive coordinator – Ken Whisenhunt; Quarterbacks – Frank Reich; Running backs – Ollie Wilson; Wide receivers – Fred Graves; Tight ends – Jason Michael; Offensive line – Joe D'Alessandris; Assistant offensive line – Andrew Dees; Offensive quality control – Nick Sirianni	Defensive coaches: Defensive coordinator – John Pagano; Defensive line – Don Johnson; Linebackers – Joe Barry; Assistant linebackers – Byron Storer; Secondary – Ron Milus; Assistant secondary – Greg Williams; Defensive quality control – Chad Grimm; Special teams coaches: Special teams coordinator – Kevin Spencer; Assistant special teams – Craig Aukerman; Strength and conditioning: Strength and conditioning – Kent Johnson; Assistant strength and conditioning – Rick Lyle

== Final roster ==
2013 San Diego Chargers roster
Quarterbacks (QB): 17 Philip Rivers; 4 Brad Sorensen; 6 Charlie Whitehurst; Running backs (RB): 23 Ronnie Brown; 24 Ryan Mathews; 33 Le'Ron McClain FB; 39 Danny Woodhead; Wide receivers (WR): 16 Seyi Ajirotutu; 13 Keenan Allen; 86 Vincent Brown; 10 Lavelle Hawkins; 11 Eddie Royal; Tight ends (TE): 81 Jake Byrne; 85 Antonio Gates; 89 Ladarius Green	Offensive linemen (OL): 66 Jeromey Clary G; 77 King Dunlap LT; 76 D. J. Fluker RT; 61 Nick Hardwick C; 74 Rich Ohrnberger C; 78 Chad Rinehart G; 70 Stephen Schilling G; 69 Willie Smith RT; 63 Johnnie Troutman G; 72 Kenny Wiggins RT; Defensive linemen (DL): 95 Kwame Geathers DE; 71 Lawrence Guy DE; 98 Sean Lissemore NT; 94 Corey Liuget DE; 91 Kendall Reyes DE; 92 Cam Thomas NT	Linebackers (LB): 97 Bront Bird ILB; 56 Donald Butler ILB; 59 Andrew Gachkar ILB; 54 Melvin Ingram OLB; 96 Jarret Johnson OLB; 90 Thomas Keiser OLB; 50 Manti Te'o ILB; 52 Reggie Walker LB; 58 Tourek Williams OLB; Defensive backs (DB): 37 Jahleel Addae SS; 20 Crezdon Butler CB; 22 Derek Cox CB; 35 Marcus Cromartie CB; 38 Marcus Gilchrist SS; 31 Richard Marshall CB; 25 Darrell Stuckey FS; 28 Brandon Taylor SS; 32 Eric Weddle FS; 29 Shareece Wright CB; Special teams (ST): 9 Nick Novak K; 5 Mike Scifres P; 47 Mike Windt LS	Practice squad: 67 Nick Becton LT; 15 Dan DePalma WR; 36 Brandon Jones CB; 53 Terrell Manning ILB; 82 Ryan Otten TE; 12 Tobais Palmer WR; 75 Damik Scafe DE; 30 Kerwynn Williams RB; Reserve: 84 Danario Alexander WR (IR); 51 Larry English OLB (IR); 80 Malcom Floyd WR (IR); 93 Dwight Freeney OLB (IR); 79 Michael Harris LT (IR); 68 Byron Jerideau NT (IR); 57 Jonas Mouton ILB (IR); 26 Johnny Patrick CB (IR); 83 John Phillips TE (IR); 27 Steve Williams CB (IR); Rookies in italics 53 active, 10 reserve, 8 practice squad

== Schedule ==
=== Preseason ===
Week	Date	Opponent	Result	Record	Venue	Recap
1	August 8	Seattle Seahawks	**L** 10–31	0–1	Qualcomm Stadium	Recap
2	August 15	at Chicago Bears	**L** 28–33	0–2	Soldier Field	Recap
3	August 24	at Arizona Cardinals	**W** 24–7	1–2	University of Phoenix Stadium	Recap
4	August 29	San Francisco 49ers	**L** 6–41	1–3	Qualcomm Stadium	Recap

=== Regular season ===
Week	Date	Opponent	Result	Record	Venue	Recap
1	September 9	Houston Texans	**L** 28–31	0–1	Qualcomm Stadium	Recap
2	September 15	at Philadelphia Eagles	**W** 33–30	1–1	Lincoln Financial Field	Recap
3	September 22	at Tennessee Titans	**L** 17–20	1–2	LP Field	Recap
4	September 29	Dallas Cowboys	**W** 30–21	2–2	Qualcomm Stadium	Recap
5	October 6	at **Oakland Raiders**	**L** 17–27	2–3	O.co Coliseum	Recap
6	October 14	Indianapolis Colts	**W** 19–9	3–3	Qualcomm Stadium	Recap
7	October 20	at Jacksonville Jaguars	**W** 24–6	4–3	EverBank Field	Recap
8	Bye					
9	November 3	at Washington Redskins	**L** 24–30 (OT)	4–4	Fedex Field	Recap
10	November 10	**Denver Broncos**	**L** 20–28	4–5	Qualcomm Stadium	Recap
11	November 17	at Miami Dolphins	**L** 16–20	4–6	Sun Life Stadium	Recap
12	November 24	at **Kansas City Chiefs**	**W** 41–38	5–6	Arrowhead Stadium	Recap
13	December 1	Cincinnati Bengals	**L** 10–17	5–7	Qualcomm Stadium	Recap
14	December 8	New York Giants	**W** 37–14	6–7	Qualcomm Stadium	Recap
15	December 12	at **Denver Broncos**	**W** 27–20	7–7	Sports Authority Field at Mile High	Recap
16	December 22	**Oakland Raiders**	**W** 26–13	8–7	Qualcomm Stadium	Recap
17	December 29	**Kansas City Chiefs**	**W** 27–24 (OT)	9–7	Qualcomm Stadium	Recap

Note: Intra-division opponents are in bold text.

== Postseason ==
Round	Date	Opponent (seed)	Result	Record	Venue	Recap
Wild Card	January 5, 2014	at Cincinnati Bengals (3)	W 27–10	1–0	Paul Brown Stadium	Recap
Divisional	January 12, 2014	at Denver Broncos (1)	L 17–24	1–1	Sports Authority Field at Mile High	Recap

== Game summaries ==
=== Regular season ===
==== Week 1: vs. Houston Texans ====
Week One: Houston Texans at San Diego Chargers – Game summary

Quarter	1	2	3	4	Total
Texans	7	0	7	17	31
Chargers	7	14	7	0	28

at Qualcomm Stadium, San Diego, California

- Date: September 9
- Game time: 7:20 p.m. PDT
- Game weather: 70 °F (21 °C), partly cloudy
- Game attendance: 59,522
- Referee: Scott Green
- TV announcers (ESPN): Chris Berman, Trent Dilfer, and Sal Paolantonio
- Recap, Game book

Game information

First quarter

- SD – Ryan Mathews 14-yard pass from Philip Rivers (Nick Novak kick), 14:45. Chargers 7–0. Drive: 1 play, 14 yards, 0:05.
- HOU – Owen Daniels 1-yard pass from Matt Schaub (Randy Bullock kick), 3:11. Tied 7–7. Drive: 10 plays, 71 yards, 5:51.

Second quarter

- SD – Eddie Royal 6-yard pass from Philip Rivers (Nick Novak kick), 12:24. Chargers 14–7. Drive: 12 plays, 80 yards, 5:47.
- SD – Vincent Brown 10-yard pass from Philip Rivers (Nick Novak kick), 0:18. Chargers 21–7. Drive: 8 plays, 59 yards, 1:43.

Third quarter

- SD – Eddie Royal 1-yard pass from Philip Rivers (Nick Novak kick), 10:42. Chargers 28–7. Drive: 8 plays, 80 yards, 4:18.
- HOU – Garrett Graham 7-yard pass from Matt Schaub (Randy Bullock kick), 4:57. Chargers 28–14. Drive: 11 plays, 70 yards, 5:45.

Fourth quarter

- HOU – Owen Daniels 9-yard pass from Matt Schaub (Randy Bullock kick), 14:44. Chargers 28–21. Drive: 10 plays, 75 yards, 3:46.
- HOU – Brian Cushing 18-yard interception return (Randy Bullock kick), 9:30. Tied 28–28.
- HOU – Randy Bullock 41-yard field goal, 0:00. Texans 31–28. Drive: 9 plays, 38 yards, 3:53.

Top passers

- HOU – Matt Schaub – 34/45, 346 yards, 3 TD, INT
- SD – Philip Rivers – 14/29, 195 yards, 4 TD, INT

Top rushers

- HOU – Arian Foster – 18 rushes, 57 yards
- SD – Ryan Mathews – 13 rushes, 33 yards

Top receivers

- HOU – Andre Johnson – 12 receptions, 146 yards
- SD – Antonio Gates – 2 receptions, 49 yards

With the loss, the Chargers started their season 0–1.

==== Week 2: at Philadelphia Eagles ====
Week Two: San Diego Chargers at Philadelphia Eagles – Game summary

Quarter	1	2	3	4	Total
Chargers	3	10	7	13	33
Eagles	3	7	10	10	30

at Lincoln Financial Field, Philadelphia, Pennsylvania

- Date: September 15
- Game time: 1:00 p.m. EDT/10:00 am. PDT
- Game weather: 71 °F (22 °C), sunny
- Game attendance: 69,144
- Referee: Terry McAulay
- TV announcers (CBS): Greg Gumbel and Dan Dierdorf
- Recap, Game book

Game information

First quarter

- SD – Nick Novak 49-yard field goal, 7:26. Chargers 3–0. Drive: 8 plays, 59 yards, 4:25.
- PHI – Alex Henery 25-yard field goal, 5:30. Tied 3–3. Drive: 5 plays, 70 yards, 1:56.

Second quarter

- SD – Eddie Royal 11-yard pass from Philip Rivers (Nick Novak kick), 14:07. Chargers 10–3. Drive: 11 plays, 93 yards, 6:23.
- SD – Nick Novak 44-yard field goal, 8:01. Chargers 13–3. Drive: 7 plays, 53 yards, 3:37.
- PHI – Riley Cooper 13-yard pass from Michael Vick (Alex Henery kick), 6:41. Chargers 13–10. Drive: 4 plays, 75 yards, 1:20.

Third quarter

- SD – Eddie Royal 24-yard pass from Philip Rivers (Nick Novak kick), 10:04. Chargers 20–10. Drive: 11 plays, 80 yards, 4:56.
- PHI – Alex Henery 48-yard field goal, 6:45. Chargers 20–13. Drive: 8 plays, 49 yards, 3:19.
- PHI – DeSean Jackson 61-yard pass from Michael Vick (Alex Henery kick), 4:42. Tied 20–20. Drive: 2 plays, 65 yards, 0:26.

Fourth quarter

- SD – Nick Novak 33-yard field goal, 10:47. Chargers 23–20. Drive: 17 plays, 73 yards, 8:55.
- PHI – Michael Vick 2-yard run (Alex Henery kick), 7:06. Eagles 27–23. Drive: 10 plays, 76 yards, 3:41.
- SD – Eddie Royal 15-yard pass from Philip Rivers (Nick Novak kick), 3:11. Chargers 30–27. Drive: 7 plays, 39 yards, 3:55.
- PHI – Alex Henery 32-yard field goal, 1:51. Tied 30–30. Drive: 9 plays, 57 yards, 1:20.
- SD – Nick Novak 46-yard field goal, 0:07. Chargers 33–30. Drive: 9 plays, 51 yards, 1:44.

Top passers

- SD – Philip Rivers – 36/47, 419 yards, 3 TD
- PHI – Michael Vick – 23/36, 428 yards, 2 TD

Top rushers

- SD – Ryan Mathews – 16 rushes, 73 yards
- PHI – LeSean McCoy – 11 rushes, 53 yards

Top receivers

- SD – Antonio Gates – 8 receptions, 124 yards
- PHI – DeSean Jackson – 9 receptions, 193 yards, TD

==== Week 3: at Tennessee Titans ====
Week Three: San Diego Chargers at Tennessee Titans – Game summary

Quarter	1	2	3	4	Total
Chargers	7	3	7	0	17
Titans	0	10	0	10	20

at LP Field, Nashville, Tennessee

- Date: September 22
- Game time: 12:00 p.m. CDT/10:00 am. PDT
- Game weather: 72 °F (22 °C), sunny
- Game attendance: 69,143
- Referee: Tony Corrente
- TV announcers (CBS): Ian Eagle and Dan Fouts
- Recap, Game book

Game information

First quarter

- SD – Antonio Gates 7-yard pass from Philip Rivers (Nick Novak kick), 9:34. Chargers 7–0. Drive: 6 plays, 49 yards, 3:32.

Second quarter

- TEN – Rob Bironas 20-yard field goal, 13:00. Chargers 7–3. Drive: 11 plays, 90 yards, 4:50.
- SD – Nick Novak 44-yard field goal, 4:47. Chargers 10–3. Drive: 5 plays, 4 yards, 2:56.
- TEN – Jake Locker 7-yard run (Rob Bironas kick), 1:08. Tied 10–10. Drive: 8 plays, 76 yards, 3:39.

Third quarter

- SD – Ronnie Brown 1-yard run (Nick Novak kick), 2:42. Chargers 17–10. Drive: 9 plays, 67 yards, 4:25.

Fourth quarter

- TEN – Rob Bironas 37-yard field goal, 6:07. Chargers 17–13. Drive: 11 plays, 43 yards, 4:24.
- TEN – Justin Hunter 34-yard pass from Jake Locker (Rob Bironas kick), 0:15. Titans 20–17. Drive: 10 plays, 94 yards, 1:50.

Top passers

- SD – Philip Rivers – 20/24, 184 yards, TD
- TEN – Jake Locker – 23/37, 299 yards, TD

Top rushers

- SD – Ryan Mathews – 16 rushes, 58 yards
- TEN – Chris Johnson – 19 rushes, 90 yards

Top receivers

- SD – Antonio Gates 5 receptions, 55 yards, TD
- TEN – Nate Washington – 8 receptions, 131 yards

The loss snapped the Chargers' nine-game winning streak against the Titans, losing to them for the first time since the 1992 season.

==== Week 4: vs. Dallas Cowboys ====
Week Four: Dallas Cowboys at San Diego Chargers – Game summary

Quarter	1	2	3	4	Total
Cowboys	0	21	0	0	21
Chargers	7	6	7	10	30

at Qualcomm Stadium, San Diego, California

- Date: September 29
- Game time: 1:25 pm. PDT
- Game weather: 80 °F (27 °C), sunny
- Game attendance: 68,601
- Referee: Ed Hochuli
- TV announcers (Fox): Kenny Albert, Daryl Johnston, and Tony Siragusa
- Recap, Game book

Game information

First quarter

- SD – Danny Woodhead 26-yard pass from Philip Rivers (Nick Novak kick), 7:05. Chargers 7–0. Drive: 5 plays, 65 yards, 3:01.

Second quarter

- DAL – Dez Bryant 5-yard pass from Tony Romo (Dan Bailey kick), 13:10. Tied 7–7. Drive: 9 plays, 85 yards, 3:58.
- SD – Nick Novak 36-yard field goal, 5:11. Chargers 10–7. Drive: 6 plays, 36 yards, 2:27.
- DAL – Dez Bryant 34-yard pass from Tony Romo (Dan Bailey kick), 2:36. Cowboys 14–10. Drive: 5 plays, 72 yards, 2:35.
- DAL – Sean Lee 52-yard interception return (Dan Bailey kick), 1:19. Cowboys 21–10.
- SD – Nick Novak 42-yard field goal, 0:00. Cowboys 21–13. Drive: 8 plays, 66 yards, 1:19.

Third quarter

- SD – Danny Woodhead 13-yard pass from Philip Rivers (Nick Novak kick), 9:32. Cowboys 21–20. Drive: 10 plays, 80 yards, 5:28.

Fourth quarter

- SD – Nick Novak 23-yard field goal, 14:46. Chargers 23–21. Drive: 13 plays, 84 yards, 6:23.
- SD – Antonio Gates 56-yard pass from Philip Rivers (Nick Novak kick), 6:54. Chargers 30–21. Drive: 6 plays, 80 yards, 3:08.

Top passers

- DAL – Tony Romo – 27/37, 246 yards, 2 TD
- SD – Philip Rivers – 35/42, 401 yards, 3 TD, INT

Top rushers

- DAL – DeMarco Murray – 14 rushes, 70 yards
- SD – Ryan Mathews – 19 rushes, 62 yards

Top receivers

- DAL – Dez Bryant – 6 receptions, 81 yards, 2 TD
- SD – Antonio Gates – 10 receptions, 136 yards, TD

==== Week 5: at Oakland Raiders ====
Week Five: San Diego Chargers at Oakland Raiders – Game summary

Quarter	1	2	3	4	Total
Chargers	0	0	3	14	17
Raiders	14	3	7	3	27

at O.co Coliseum, Oakland, California

- Date: October 6
- Game time: 8:35 pm. PDT
- Game weather: 70 °F (21 °C), partly cloudy
- Game attendance: 48,834
- Referee: Jeff Triplette
- TV announcers (NFLN*): Ian Eagle and Dan Fouts
- Recap, Game book

Game information

First quarter

- OAK – Rod Streater 44-yard pass from Terrelle Pryor (Sebastian Janikowski kick), 13:03. Raiders 7–0. Drive: 1 play, 44 yards, 0:08.
- OAK – Denarius Moore 2-yard pass from Terrelle Pryor (Sebastian Janikowski kick), 1:28. Raiders 14–0. Drive: 13 plays, 88 yards, 8:08.

Second quarter

- OAK – Sebastian Janikowski 47-yard field goal, 4:13. Raiders 17–0. Drive: 4 plays, 8 yards, 1:34.

Third quarter

- SD – Nick Novak 35-yard field goal, 4:51. Raiders 17–3. Drive: 16 plays, 75 yards, 7:15.
- OAK – Charles Woodson 25-yard fumble return (Sebastian Janikowski kick), 2:37. Raiders 24–3

Fourth quarter

- SD – Danny Woodhead 5-yard pass from Philip Rivers (Nick Novak kick), 14:57. Raiders 24–10. Drive: 7 plays, 80 yards, 2:40.
- SD – Keenan Allen 7-yard pass from Philip Rivers (Nick Novak kick), 10:17. Raiders 24–17. Drive: 5 plays, 54 yards, 2:28.
- OAK – Sebastian Janikowski 50-yard field goal, 4:24. Raiders 27–17. Drive: 9 plays, 48 yards, 5:53.

Top passers

- SD – Philip Rivers – 36/48, 411 yards, 2 TD, 3 INT
- OAK – Terrelle Pryor – 18/23, 221 yards, 2 TD

Top rushers

- SD – Danny Woodhead – 9 rushes, 17 yards
- OAK – Rashad Jennings – 10 rushes, 41 yards

Top receivers

- SD – Vincent Brown – 7 receptions, 117 yards
- OAK – Denarius Moore – 5 receptions, 84 yards, TD

This game was moved to an 8:35 pm. PDT kickoff, and from CBS to NFL Network as a "special edition" of Thursday Night Football, as extended time was required to convert the field back from its baseball configuration due to an Oakland Athletics American League Division Series game the previous night.

==== Week 6: vs. Indianapolis Colts ====
Week Six: Indianapolis Colts at San Diego Chargers – Game summary

Quarter	1	2	3	4	Total
Colts	3	3	0	3	9
Chargers	0	10	3	6	19

at Qualcomm Stadium, San Diego, California

- Date: October 14
- Game time: 5:40 pm. PDT
- Game weather: 69 °F (21 °C), sunny
- Game attendance: 57,954
- Referee: Pete Morelli
- TV announcers (ESPN): Mike Tirico, Jon Gruden, and Lisa Salters
- Recap, Game book

Game information

First quarter

- IND – Adam Vinatieri 30-yard field goal, 11:27. Colts 3–0. Drive: 8 plays, 69 yards, 3:33.

Second quarter

- SD – Keenan Allen 22-yard pass from Philip Rivers (Nick Novak kick), 12:02. Chargers 7–3. Drive: 12 plays, 74 yards, 6:14.
- SD – Nick Novak 31-yard field goal, 1:41. Chargers 10–3. Drive: 17 plays, 79 yards, 7:58.
- IND – Adam Vinatieri 50-yard field goal, 0:00. Chargers 10–6. Drive: 8 plays, 38 yards, 1:41.

Third quarter

- SD – Nick Novak 33-yard field goal, 9:05. Chargers 13–6. Drive: 11 plays, 65 yards, 5:55.

Fourth quarter

- SD – Nick Novak 34-yard field goal, 9:43. Chargers 16–6. Drive: 15 plays, 74 yards, 9:13.
- IND – Adam Vinatieri 51-yard field goal, 7:21. Chargers 16–9. Drive: 6 plays, 47 yards, 2:22.
- SD – Nick Novak 50-yard field goal, 1:55. Chargers 19–9. Drive: 5 plays, 19 yards, 1:22.

Top passers

- IND – Andrew Luck – 18/30, 202 yards, INT
- SD – Philip Rivers – 22/33, 237 yards, TD

Top rushers

- IND – Trent Richardson – 10 rushes, 40 yards
- SD – Ryan Mathews – 22 rushes, 102 yards

Top receivers

- IND – Reggie Wayne – 5 receptions, 88 yards
- SD – Keenan Allen – 9 receptions, 107 yards, TD

==== Week 7: at Jacksonville Jaguars ====
Week Seven: San Diego Chargers at Jacksonville Jaguars – Game summary

Quarter	1	2	3	4	Total
Chargers	7	7	3	7	24
Jaguars	0	3	3	0	6

at EverBank Field, Jacksonville, Florida

- Date: October 20
- Game time: 1:00 pm. EDT/10:00 am. PDT
- Game weather: 73 °F (23 °C), no chance of rain
- Game attendance: 59,550
- Referee: Walt Coleman
- TV announcers (CBS): Spero Dedes and Steve Beuerlein
- Recap, Game book

Game information

First quarter

- SD – Danny Woodhead 2-yard run (Nick Novak kick), 7:30. Chargers 7–0. Drive: 13 plays, 80 yards, 7:37.

Second quarter

- SD – Eddie Royal 27-yard pass from Philip Rivers (Nick Novak kick), 12:44. Chargers 14–0. Drive: 10 plays, 80 yards, 6:08.
- JAX – Josh Scobee 30-yard field goal, 4:54. Chargers 14–3. Drive: 18 plays, 68 yards, 7:46.

Third quarter

- SD – Nick Novak 20-yard field goal, 6:52. Chargers 17–3. Drive: 10 plays, 79 yards, 6:21.
- JAX – Josh Scobee 23-yard field goal, 3:57. Chargers 17–6. Drive: 8 plays, 75 yards, 2:54.

Fourth quarter

- SD – Ryan Mathews 3-yard run (Nick Novak kick), 14:13. Chargers 24–6. Drive: 10 plays, 84 yards, 4:46.

Top passers

- SD – Philip Rivers – 22/26, 285 yards, TD
- JAX – Chad Henne – 23/36, 318 yards, INT

Top rushers

- SD – Ryan Mathews – 21 rushes, 110 yards, TD
- JAX – Maurice Jones-Drew – 9 rushes, 37 yards

Top receivers

- SD – Eddie Royal – 4 receptions, 69 yards, TD
- JAX – Mike Brown – 5 receptions, 120 yards

==== Week 9: at Washington Redskins ====
Week Nine: San Diego Chargers at Washington Redskins – Game summary

Quarter	1	2	3	4	OT	Total
Chargers	0	14	0	10	0	24
Redskins	0	7	7	10	6	30

at FedExField, Landover, Maryland

- Date: November 3
- Game time: 1:00 p.m. EST/10:00 a.m. PST
- Game weather: 57 °F (14 °C), sunny
- Game attendance: 80,115
- Referee: Jerome Boger
- TV announcers (CBS): Ian Eagle and Dan Fouts
- Recap, Game book

Game information

First quarter

- No scoring plays.

Second quarter

- SD – Sean Lissemore interception in end zone (Nick Novak kick), 11:35. Chargers 7–0.
- WAS – Alfred Morris 5-yard run (Kai Forbath kick), 5:25. Tied 7–7. Drive: 4 plays, 67 yards, 1:55.
- SD – Eddie Royal 15-yard pass from Philip Rivers (Nick Novak kick), 0:42. Chargers 14–7. Drive: 11 plays, 85 yards, 4:43.

Third quarter

- WAS – Darrel Young 1-yard run (Kai Forbath kick), 9:43. Tied 14–14. Drive: 9 plays, 74 yards, 5:17.

Fourth quarter

- WAS – Darrel Young 1-yard run (Kai Forbath kick), 14:17. Redskins 21–14. Drive: 11 plays, 79 yards, 7:45.
- WAS – Kai Forbath 47-yard field goal, 6:59. Redskins 24–14. Drive: 7 plays, 22 yards, 3:26.
- SD – Keenan Allen 16-yard pass from Philip Rivers (Nick Novak kick), 4:10. Redskins 24–21. Drive: 8 plays, 77 yards, 2:49.
- SD – Nick Novak 19-yard field goal, 0:03. Tied 24–24. Drive: 14 plays, 91 yards, 2:07.

Overtime

- WAS – Darrel Young 4-yard run, 8:59. Redskins 30–24. Drive: 10 plays, 78 yards, 6:01.

Top passers

- SD – Philip Rivers – 29/46, 341 yards, 2 TD, 2 INT
- WAS – Robert Griffin III – 23/32, 291 yards, INT

Top rushers

- SD – Ryan Mathews – 7 rushes, 34 yards
- WAS – Alfred Morris – 25 rushes, 121 yards, TD

Top receivers

- SD – Keenan Allen – 8 receptions, 128 yards, TD
- WAS – Pierre Garçon – 7 receptions, 172 yards

==== Week 10: vs. Denver Broncos ====
Week Ten: Denver Broncos at San Diego Chargers – Game summary

Quarter	1	2	3	4	Total
Broncos	7	14	7	0	28
Chargers	0	6	7	7	20

at Qualcomm Stadium, San Diego, California

- Date: November 10
- Game time: 1:25 pm. PST
- Game weather: 78 °F (26 °C), sunny
- Game attendance: 68,847
- Referee: Tony Corrente
- TV announcers (CBS): Jim Nantz and Phil Simms
- Recap, Game book

Game information

First quarter

- DEN – Julius Thomas 74-yard pass from Peyton Manning (Matt Prater kick), 9:18. Broncos 7–0. Drive: 3 plays, 85 yards, 0:57.

Second quarter

- SD – Nick Novak 26-yard field goal, 14:58. Broncos 7–3. Drive: 14 plays, 72 yards, 9:20.
- SD – Nick Novak 40-yard field goal, 9:05. Broncos 7–6. Drive: 5 plays, 37 yards, 1:59.
- DEN – Demaryius Thomas 11-yard pass from Peyton Manning (Matt Prater kick), 6:38. Broncos 14–6. Drive: 7 plays, 80 yards, 2:27.
- DEN – Demaryius Thomas 7-yard pass from Peyton Manning (Matt Prater kick), 0:13. Broncos 21–6. Drive: 9 plays, 73 yards, 1:25.

Third quarter

- DEN – Demaryius Thomas 34-yard pass from Peyton Manning (Matt Prater kick), 11:34. Broncos 28–6. Drive: 8 plays, 78 yards, 3:26.
- SD – Danny Woodhead 7-yard pass from Philip Rivers (Nick Novak kick), 8:38. Broncos 28–13. Drive: 2 plays, 11 yards, 0:52.

Fourth quarter

- SD – Ryan Mathews 1-yard run (Nick Novak kick), 10:42. Broncos 28–20. Drive: 9 plays, 60 yards, 4:47.

Top passers

- DEN – Peyton Manning – 25/36, 330 yards, 4 TD
- SD – Philip Rivers – 19/29, 218 yards, TD

Top rushers

- DEN – Knowshon Moreno – 15 rushes, 65 yards
- SD – Ryan Mathews – 14 rushes, 59 yards, TD

Top receivers

- DEN – Demaryius Thomas – 7 receptions, 108 yards, 3 TD
- SD – Antonio Gates – 4 receptions, 62 yards

==== Week 11: at Miami Dolphins ====
Week Eleven: San Diego Chargers at Miami Dolphins – Game summary

Quarter	1	2	3	4	Total
Chargers	7	3	3	3	16
Dolphins	3	7	7	3	20

at Sun Life Stadium, Miami Gardens, Florida

- Date: November 17
- Game time: 4:05 pm. EST/1:05 pm. PST
- Game weather: 81 °F (27 °C), cloudy
- Game attendance: 60,256
- Referee: Pete Morelli
- TV announcers (CBS): Greg Gumbel and Dan Dierdorf
- Recap, Game book

Game information

First quarter

- MIA – Caleb Sturgis 22-yard field goal, 9:13. Dolphins 3–0. Drive: 11 plays, 76 yards, 5:47.
- SD – Antonio Gates 5-yard pass from Philip Rivers (Nick Novak kick), 0:18. Chargers 7–3. Drive: 4 plays, 49 yards, 2:17.

Second quarter

- MIA – Daniel Thomas 1-yard run (Caleb Sturgis kick), 9:43. Dolphins 10–7. Drive: 9 plays, 80 yards, 5:35.
- SD – Nick Novak 27-yard field goal, 0:54. Tied 10–10. Drive: 8 plays, 50 yards, 2:45.

Third quarter

- MIA – Charles Clay 39-yard pass from Ryan Tannehill, 7:43. Dolphins 17–10. Drive: 5 plays, 80 yards, 2:36.
- SD – Nick Novak 50-yard field goal, 4:00. Dolphins 17–13. Drive: 8 plays, 48 yards, 3:43.

Fourth quarter

- SD – Nick Novak 29-yard field goal, 14:52. Dolphins 17–16. Drive: 5 plays, 56 yards, 1:30.
- MIA – Caleb Sturgis 37-yard field goal, 8:34. Dolphins 20–16. Drive: 8 plays, 41 yards, 3:17.

Top passers

- SD – Philip Rivers – 22/34, 298 yards, TD, INT
- MIA – Ryan Tannehill – 22/35, 268 yards, TD, INT

Top rushers

- SD – Ryan Mathews – 19 rushes, 127 yards
- MIA – Daniel Thomas – 10 rushes, 57 yards, TD

Top receivers

- SD – Ladarius Green – 4 receptions, 81 yards
- MIA – Charles Clay – 6 receptions, 90 yards, TD

==== Week 12: at Kansas City Chiefs ====
Week Twelve: San Diego Chargers at Kansas City Chiefs – Game summary

Quarter	1	2	3	4	Total
Chargers	3	7	14	17	41
Chiefs	7	7	14	10	38

at Arrowhead Stadium, Kansas City, Missouri

- Date: November 24
- Game time: 12:00 p.m. CST/10:00 am. PST
- Game weather: 24 °F (−4 °C), mostly sunny
- Game attendance: 75,259
- Referee: Walt Coleman
- TV announcers (CBS): Jim Nantz and Phil Simms
- Recap, Game book

Game information

First quarter

- SD – Nick Novak 30-yard field goal, 6:11. Chargers 3–0. Drive: 7 plays, 43 yards, 3:18.
- KC – Donnie Avery 32-yard pass from Alex Smith (Ryan Succop kick), 1:37. Chiefs 7–3. Drive: 8 plays, 74 yards, 4:34.

Second quarter

- KC – Jamaal Charles 7-yard run (Ryan Succop kick), 3:03. Chiefs 14–3. Drive: 3 plays, 46 yards, 1:26.
- SD – Danny Woodhead 11-yard pass from Philip Rivers (Nick Novak kick), 0:16. Chiefs 14–10. Drive: 11 plays, 80 yards, 2:47.

Third quarter

- SD – Ryan Mathews 1-yard run (Nick Novak kick), 12:17. Chargers 17–14. Drive: 6 plays, 72 yards, 2:43.
- KC – Jamaal Charles 1-yard run (Ryan Succop kick), 9:00. Chiefs 21–17. Drive: 7 plays, 85 yards, 3:17.
- SD – Danny Woodhead 3-yard run (Nick Novak kick), 5:27. Chargers 24–21. Drive: 2 plays, 16 yards, 0:42.
- KC – Anthony Fasano 4-yard pass from Alex Smith (Ryan Succop kick), 2:12. Chiefs 28–24. Drive: 7 plays, 64 yards, 3:15.

Fourth quarter

- SD – Nick Novak 30-yard field goal, 12:31. Chiefs 28–27. Drive: 10 plays, 59 yards, 4:41.
- KC – Ryan Succop 25-yard field goal, 9:32. Chiefs 31–27. Drive: 6 plays, 57 yards, 2:59.
- SD – Ladarius Green 60-yard pass from Philip Rivers (Nick Novak kick), 7:50. Chargers 34–31. Drive: 3 plays, 68 yards, 1:42.
- KC – Dwayne Bowe 5-yard pass from Alex Smith (Ryan Succop kick), 1:22. Chiefs 38–34. Drive: 6 plays, 55 yards, 2:29.
- SD – Seyi Ajirotutu 26-yard pass from Philip Rivers (Nick Novak kick), 0:24. Chargers 41–38. Drive: 7 plays, 78 yards, 0:58.

Top passers

- SD – Philip Rivers – 27/39, 392 yards, 3 TD
- KC – Alex Smith – 26/38, 294 yards, 3 TD, INT

Top rushers

- SD – Ryan Mathews – 14 rushes, 55 yards, TD
- KC – Jamaal Charles – 14 rushes, 115 yards, 2 TD

Top receivers

- SD – Keenan Allen – 9 receptions, 124 yards
- KC – Donnie Avery – 4 receptions, 91 yards, TD

==== Week 13: vs. Cincinnati Bengals ====
Week Thirteen: Cincinnati Bengals at San Diego Chargers – Game summary

Quarter	1	2	3	4	Total
Bengals	0	7	7	3	17
Chargers	0	7	0	3	10

at Qualcomm Stadium, San Diego, California

- Date: December 1
- Game time: 1:25 pm. PST
- Game weather: 77 °F (25 °C), sunny
- Game attendance: 61,536
- Referee: John Parry
- TV announcers (CBS (blacked out locally)): Ian Eagle and Dan Fouts (blacked out locally)
- Recap, Game book

Game information

First quarter

- No scoring plays.

Second quarter

- CIN – BenJarvus Green-Ellis 4-yard run (Mike Nugent kick), 14:56. Bengals 7–0. Drive: 10 plays, 67 yards, 4:40.
- SD – Ladarius Green 30-yard pass from Philip Rivers (Nick Novak kick), 11:11. Tied 7–7. Drive: 8 plays, 78 yards, 3:45.

Third quarter

- CIN – A. J. Green 21-yard pass from Andy Dalton (Mike Nugent kick), 01:42. Bengals 14–7. Drive: 10 plays, 75 yards, 5:21.

Fourth quarter

- CIN – Mike Nugent 46-yard field goal, 9:16. Bengals 17–7. Drive: 7 plays, 62 yards, 3:27.
- SD – Nick Novak 48-yard field goal, 4:43. Bengals 17–10. Drive: 8 plays, 27 yards, 2:07.

Top passers

- CIN – Andy Dalton – 14/23, 190 yards, TD, INT
- SD – Philip Rivers – 23/37, 252 yards, TD, INT

Top rushers

- CIN – BenJarvus Green-Ellis – 20 rushes, 92 yards, TD
- SD – Ryan Mathews – 14 rushes, 61 yards

Top receivers

- CIN – A. J. Green – 5 receptions, 83 yards, TD
- SD – Keenan Allen – 8 receptions, 106 yards

==== Week 14: vs. New York Giants ====
Week Fourteen: New York Giants at San Diego Chargers – Game summary

Quarter	1	2	3	4	Total
Giants	0	0	7	7	14
Chargers	7	17	7	6	37

at Qualcomm Stadium, San Diego, California

- Date: December 8
- Game time: 1:25 pm. PST
- Game weather: 53 °F (12 °C), sunny
- Game attendance: 65,132
- Referee: Ron Winter
- TV announcers (Fox): Kenny Albert, Daryl Johnston, and Tony Siragusa
- Recap, Game book

Game information

First quarter

- SD – Keenan Allen 43-yard pass from Philip Rivers (Nick Novak kick), 8:18. Chargers 7–0. Drive: 3 plays, 50 yards, 0:53.

Second quarter

- SD – Nick Novak 36-yard field goal, 11:01. Chargers 10–0. Drive: 15 plays, 76 yards, 7:36.
- SD – Keenan Allen 4-yard pass from Philip Rivers (Nick Novak kick), 3:49. Chargers 17–0. Drive: 11 plays, 67 yards, 6:09.
- SD – Danny Woodhead 6-yard pass from Philip Rivers (Nick Novak kick), 0:19. Chargers 24–0. Drive: 5 plays, 39 yards, 2:16.

Third quarter

- NYG – Peyton Hillis 1-yard run (Josh Brown kick), 10:45. Chargers 24–7. Drive: 7 plays, 18 yards, 4:04.
- SD – Ryan Mathews 1-yard run (Nick Novak kick), 5:06. Chargers 31–7. Drive: 11 plays, 80 yards, 5:39.

Fourth quarter

- NYG – Brandon Myers 5-yard pass from Eli Manning (Josh Brown kick), 14:54. Chargers 31–14. Drive: 11 plays, 86 yards, 5:12.
- SD – Nick Novak 27-yard field goal, 7:31. Chargers 34–14. Drive: 11 plays, 75 yards, 7:23.
- SD – Nick Novak 43-yard field goal, 3:24. Chargers 37–14. Drive: 7 plays, 18 yards, 2:27.

Top passers

- NYG – Eli Manning – 20/32, 259 yards, TD, 2 INT
- SD – Philip Rivers – 21/28, 249 yards, 3 TD

Top rushers

- NYG – Andre Brown – 16 rushes, 81 yards
- SD – Ryan Mathews – 29 rushes, 103 yards, TD

Top receivers

- NYG – Hakeem Nicks – 5 receptions, 135 yards
- SD – Keenan Allen – 3 receptions, 59 yards, 2 TD

==== Week 15: at Denver Broncos ====
Week Fifteen: San Diego Chargers at Denver Broncos – Game summary

Quarter	1	2	3	4	Total
Chargers	3	14	7	3	27
Broncos	10	0	0	10	20

at Sports Authority Field at Mile High, Denver, Colorado

- Date: December 12
- Game time: 6:25 p.m. MST/5:25 pm. PST
- Game weather: 37 °F (3 °C), mostly clear
- Game attendance: 76,497
- Referee: Bill Vinovich
- TV announcers (NFLN): Brad Nessler, Mike Mayock and Alex Flanagan
- Recap, Game book

Game information

First quarter

- DEN – Andre Caldwell 15-yard pass from Peyton Manning (Matt Prater kick), 11:51. Broncos 7–0. Drive: 7 plays, 69 yards, 3:09.
- SD – Nick Novak 38-yard field goal, 5:15. Broncos 7–3. Drive: 11 plays, 60 yards, 6:36.
- DEN – Matt Prater 32-yard field goal, 1:22. Broncos 10–3. Drive: 9 plays, 60 yards, 3:53.

Second quarter

- SD – Keenan Allen 19-yard pass from Philip Rivers (Nick Novak kick), 9:46. Tied 10–10. Drive: 13 plays, 80 yards, 6:36.
- SD – Keenan Allen 10-yard pass from Philip Rivers (Nick Novak kick), 1:05. Chargers 17–10. Drive: 7 plays, 43 yards, 3:26.

Third quarter

- SD – Ryan Mathews 23-yard run (Nick Novak kick), 11:06. Chargers 24–10. Drive: 8 plays, 80 yards, 3:54.

Fourth quarter

- DEN – Andre Caldwell 5-yard pass from Peyton Manning (Matt Prater kick), 10:25. Chargers 24–17. Drive: 12 plays, 89 yards, 6:07.
- SD – Nick Novak 35-yard field goal, 2:36. Chargers 27–17. Drive: 6 plays, 16 yards, 2:31.
- DEN – Matt Prater 42-yard field goal, 0:29. Chargers 27–20. Drive: 11 plays, 56 yards, 2:07.

Top passers

- SD – Philip Rivers – 12/20, 166 yards, 2 TD
- DEN – Peyton Manning – 27/41, 289 yards, 2 TD, INT

Top rushers

- SD – Ryan Mathews – 29 rushes, 127 yards, TD
- DEN – Knowshon Moreno – 8 rushes, 19 yards

Top receivers

- SD – Vincent Brown – 3 receptions, 54 yards
- DEN – Andre Caldwell – 6 receptions, 59 yards, 2 TD

==== Week 16: vs. Oakland Raiders ====
Week Sixteen: Oakland Raiders at San Diego Chargers – Game summary

Quarter	1	2	3	4	Total
Raiders	0	10	0	3	13
Chargers	3	7	10	6	26

at Qualcomm Stadium, San Diego, California

- Date: December 22
- Game time: 1:25 pm. PST
- Game weather: 67 °F (19 °C), sunny
- Game attendance: 65,675
- Referee: Walt Anderson
- TV announcers (CBS (blacked out locally)): Bill Macatee and Steve Tasker
- Recap, Game book

Game information

First quarter

- SD – Nick Novak 27-yard field goal, 2:42. Chargers 3–0. Drive: 16 plays, 82 yards, 9:16.

Second quarter

- OAK – Darren McFadden 5-yard run (Sebastian Janikowski kick), 10:39. Raiders 7–3. Drive: 6 plays, 58 yards, 3:28.
- SD – Ryan Mathews 7-yard run (Nick Novak kick), 3:13. Chargers 10–7. Drive: 2 plays, 20 yards, 0:44.
- OAK – Sebastian Janikowski 20-yard field goal, 0:10. Tied 10–10. Drive: 5 plays, 14 yards, 1:26.

Third quarter

- SD – Keenan Allen 4-yard pass from Philip Rivers (Nick Novak kick), 5:00. Chargers 17–10. Drive: 12 plays, 77 yards, 6:18.
- SD – Nick Novak 48-yard field goal, 0:56. Chargers 20–10. Drive: 6 plays, 42 yards, 2:48.

Fourth quarter

- SD – Nick Novak 28-yard field goal, 14:51. Chargers 23–10. Drive: 4 plays, 3 yards, 0:59.
- OAK – Sebastian Janikowski 42-yard field goal, 11:19. Chargers 23–13. Drive: 8 plays, 51 yards, 3:32.
- SD – Nick Novak 33-yard field goal, 6:23. Chargers 26–13. Drive: 9 plays, 59 yards, 4:56.

Top passers

- OAK – Matt McGloin – 20/36, 206 yards, INT
- SD – Philip Rivers – 19/29, 201 yards, TD, INT

Top rushers

- OAK – Rashad Jennings – 10 rushes, 45 yards
- SD – Ryan Mathews – 25 rushes, 99 yards, TD

Top receivers

- OAK – Andre Holmes – 5 receptions, 71 yards
- SD – Eddie Royal – 4 receptions, 54 yards

==== Week 17: vs. Kansas City Chiefs ====
Week Seventeen: Kansas City Chiefs at San Diego Chargers – Game summary

Quarter	1	2	3	4	OT	Total
Chiefs	14	7	3	0	0	24
Chargers	7	7	0	10	3	27

at Qualcomm Stadium, San Diego, California

- Date: December 29
- Game time: 1:25 pm. PST
- Game weather: 73 °F (23 °C), sunny
- Game attendance: 66,374
- Referee: Bill Leavy
- TV announcers (CBS): Marv Albert and Rich Gannon
- Recap, Game book

Game information

First quarter

- KC – Knile Davis 17-yard run (Ryan Succop kick), 13:03. Chiefs 7–0. Drive: 5 plays, 80 yards, 1:57.
- SD – Ladarius Green 22-yard pass from Philip Rivers (Nick Novak kick), 10:37. Tied 7–7. Drive: 5 plays, 78 yards, 2:26.
- KC – Dexter McCluster 2-yard pass from Chase Daniel (Ryan Succop kick), 5:07. Chiefs 14–7. Drive: 6 plays, 23 yards, 2:43.

Second quarter

- SD – Antonio Gates 4-yard pass from Philip Rivers (Nick Novak kick), 14:56. Tied 14–14. Drive: 10 plays, 80 yards, 5:11.
- KC – Knile Davis 2-yard run (Ryan Succop kick), 1:07. Chiefs 21–14. Drive: 11 plays, 86 yards, 5:57.

Third quarter

- KC – Ryan Succop 46-yard field goal, 7:27. Chiefs 24–14. Drive: 6 plays, 7 yards, 2:17.

Fourth quarter

- SD – Eddie Royal 6-yard pass from Philip Rivers (Nick Novak kick), 11:45. Chiefs 24–21. Drive: 10 plays, 69 yards, 4:29.
- SD – Nick Novak 22-yard field goal, 3:21. Tied 24–24. Drive: 9 plays, 66 yards, 4:16.

Overtime

- SD – Nick Novak 36-yard field goal, 5:30. Chargers 27–24. Drive: 16 plays, 62 yards, 9:30.

Top passers

- KC – Chase Daniel – 21/30, 200 yards, TD
- SD – Philip Rivers – 22/33, 229 yards, 3 TD, INT

Top rushers

- KC – Knile Davis – 27 rushes, 81 yards, 2 TD
- SD – Ryan Mathews – 24 rushes, 144 yards

Top receivers

- KC – A. J. Jenkins – 3 receptions, 67 yards
- SD – Keenan Allen – 5 receptions, 89 yards

Kansas City missed a field goal as with a few seconds left to send the game into overtime, where Nick Novak kicked the game winner. With the win, the Chargers finished the 2013 season with a record of 9–7 and clinched the second wild card spot, becoming the 6th seed entering the playoffs. Until the 2025 season, this was the last time Chargers swept the Chiefs. It was also their last home victory against the Chiefs until 2025, and their last in San Diego.

=== Postseason ===
==== AFC Wild Card Playoff Game: at #3 Cincinnati Bengals ====
AFC Wild Card Playoff Game: #6 San Diego Chargers at #3 Cincinnati Bengals – Game summary

Quarter	1	2	3	4	Total
Chargers	7	0	10	10	27
Bengals	0	10	0	0	10

at Paul Brown Stadium, Cincinnati, Ohio

- Date: January 5, 2014
- Game time: 1:05 p.m. EST/10:05 a.m. PST
- Game weather: 42 °F (6 °C), cloudy
- Game attendance: 62,277
- Referee: Jeff Triplette
- TV announcers (CBS): Jim Nantz, Phil Simms, and Tracy Wolfson
- Recap, Game book

Game information

First quarter

- SD – Danny Woodhead 5-yard run (Nick Novak kick), 0:48. Chargers 7–0. Drive: 12 plays, 86 yards, 6:56.

Second quarter

- CIN – Jermaine Gresham 4-yard pass from Andy Dalton (Mike Nugent kick), 5:59. Tied 7–7. Drive: 10 plays, 60 yards, 6:07.
- CIN – Mike Nugent 46-yard field goal, 0:00. Bengals 10–7. Drive: 6 plays, 40 yards, 1:14.

Third quarter

- SD – Ladarius Green 4-yard pass from Philip Rivers (Nick Novak kick), 6:46. Chargers 14–10. Drive: 10 plays, 80 yards, 5:40.
- SD – Nick Novak 25-yard field goal, 2:00. Chargers 17–10. Drive: 9 plays, 40 yards, 3:41.

Fourth quarter

- SD – Nick Novak 23-yard field goal, 14:16. Chargers 20–10. Drive: 5 plays, −2 yards, 1:55.
- SD – Ronnie Brown 58-yard run (Nick Novak kick), 2:17. Chargers 27–10. Drive: 2 plays, 60 yards, 0:50.

Top passers

- SD – Philip Rivers – 12/16, 128 yards, TD
- CIN – Andy Dalton – 29/51, 334 yards, TD, 2 INT

Top rushers

- SD – Ronnie Brown – 8 rushes, 77 yards, TD
- CIN – Giovani Bernard – 12 rushes, 45 yards

Top receivers

- SD – Ladarius Green – 3 receptions, 34 yards, TD
- CIN – Marvin Jones – 8 receptions, 130 yards

With the Chargers defeating the Bengals, 27–10, they recorded their first playoff victory since 2008 and advanced to the AFC Divisional Playoff Game.

==== AFC Divisional Playoff Game: at #1 Denver Broncos ====
AFC Divisional Playoff Game: #6 San Diego Chargers at #1 Denver Broncos – Game summary

Quarter	1	2	3	4	Total
Chargers	0	0	0	17	17
Broncos	7	7	3	7	24

at Sports Authority Field at Mile High, Denver, Colorado

- Date: January 12, 2014
- Game time: 2:40 p.m. MST/1:40 pm. PST
- Game weather: 41 °F (5 °C), partly cloudy
- Game attendance: 76,969
- Referee: Clete Blakeman
- TV announcers (CBS): Jim Nantz, Phil Simms, and Tracy Wolfson
- Recap, Game book

Game information

First quarter

- DEN – Demaryius Thomas 2-yard pass from Peyton Manning (Matt Prater kick), 2:25. Broncos 7–0. Drive: 14 plays, 86 yards, 7:01.

Second quarter

- DEN – Wes Welker 3-yard pass from Peyton Manning (Matt Prater kick), 6:00. Broncos 14–0. Drive: 9 plays, 57 yards, 5:13.

Third quarter

- DEN – Matt Prater 45-yard field goal, 9:35. Broncos 17–0. Drive: 12 plays, 37 yards, 5:25.

Fourth quarter

- SD – Keenan Allen 16-yard pass from Philip Rivers (Nick Novak kick), 12:59. Broncos 17–7. Drive: 6 plays, 63 yards, 3:08.
- DEN – Knowshon Moreno 3-yard run (Matt Prater kick), 8:12. Broncos 24–7. Drive: 9 plays, 81 yards, 4:47.
- SD – Keenan Allen 16-yard pass from Philip Rivers (Nick Novak kick), 5:43. Broncos 24–14. Drive: 7 plays, 80 yards, 2:29.
- SD – Nick Novak 30-yard field goal, 3:53. Broncos 24–17. Drive: 8 plays, 48 yards, 1:50.

Top passers

- SD – Philip Rivers – 18/27, 217 yards, 2 TD
- DEN – Peyton Manning – 25/36, 230 yards, 2 TD, INT

Top rushers

- SD – Danny Woodhead – 9 rushes, 29 yards
- DEN – Knowshon Moreno – 23 rushes, 82 yards, TD

Top receivers

- SD – Keenan Allen – 6 receptions, 142 yards, 2 TD
- DEN – Julius Thomas – 6 receptions, 76 yards

With the Chargers falling to the Broncos, the Chargers finished the season 10–8, their first double-digit winning season since 2009.

== Standings ==
=== Division ===
AFC West
	W	L	T	PCT	DIV	CONF	PF	PA	STK
^{(1)} Denver Broncos	13	3	0	.813	5–1	9–3	606	399	W2
^{(5)} Kansas City Chiefs	11	5	0	.688	2–4	7–5	430	305	L2
^{(6)} San Diego Chargers	9	7	0	.563	4–2	6–6	396	348	W4
Oakland Raiders	4	12	0	.250	1–5	4–8	322	453	L6

=== Conference ===
AFC
#	Team	Division	W	L	T	PCT	DIV	CONF	SOS	SOV	STK
Division winners
1	Denver Broncos	West	13	3	0	.813	5–1	9–3	.469	.423	W2
2	New England Patriots	East	12	4	0	.750	4–2	9–3	.473	.427	W2
3 (Note: Cincinnati defeated Indianapolis head-to-head (Week 14, 42–28).)	Cincinnati Bengals	North	11	5	0	.688	3–3	8–4	.480	.494	W2
4	Indianapolis Colts	South	11	5	0	.688	6–0	9–3	.484	.449	W3
Wild cards
5	Kansas City Chiefs	West	11	5	0	.688	2–4	7–5	.445	.335	L2
6	San Diego Chargers	West	9	7	0	.563	4–2	6–6	.496	.549	W4
Did not qualify for the postseason
7 (Note: Pittsburgh finished with a better division record than Baltimore.) (Note: Pittsburgh defeated the New York Jets head-to-head (Week 6, 19–6).)	Pittsburgh Steelers	North	8	8	0	.500	4–2	6–6	.469	.441	W3
8 (Note: Baltimore defeated the New York Jets head-to-head (Week 12, 19–3).)	Baltimore Ravens	North	8	8	0	.500	3–3	6–6	.484	.418	L2
9 (Note: The New York Jets finished with a better division record than Miami.)	New York Jets	East	8	8	0	.500	3–3	5–7	.488	.414	W2
10	Miami Dolphins	East	8	8	0	.500	2–4	7–5	.523	.523	L2
11	Tennessee Titans	South	7	9	0	.438	2–4	6–6	.504	.375	W2
12	Buffalo Bills	East	6	10	0	.375	3–3	5–7	.520	.500	L1
13 (Note: Oakland and Jacksonville finished with a better conference record than Cleveland.) (Note: Oakland defeated Jacksonville head-to-head (Week 2, 19–9).)	Oakland Raiders	West	4	12	0	.250	1–5	4–8	.523	.359	L6
14 (Note: Jacksonville defeated Cleveland head-to-head (Week 13, 32–28).)	Jacksonville Jaguars	South	4	12	0	.250	3–3	4–8	.504	.234	L3
15	Cleveland Browns	North	4	12	0	.250	2–4	3–9	.516	.477	L7
16	Houston Texans	South	2	14	0	.125	1–5	2–10	.559	.500	L14
Tiebreakers (Note: When breaking ties for three or more teams under the NFL's rules, they are first broken within divisions, then comparing only the highest ranked remaining team from each division.)
