= Novac =

Novac is a Romanina surname the Romanian form of the Slavic "Novak". Notable people with the surname include:

== People ==
- Alexandru Novac (born 1997), Romanian javelin thrower
- Ana Novac (1929–2010), writer and Holocaust survivor
- Baba Novac (c. 1530–1601), soldier, considered a national hero by both Serbs and Romanians
- Caius Novac (born 1921), Romanian football defender
- Daniel Novac (born 1987), Romanian footballer
- Grigore Novac (born 1983), Moldovan jurist and politician
- Gruia Novac (1944–1999), Romanian water polo player
- Iosif Novac (1922–1995), Romanian swimmer
- Luca Novac (1941–2021), Romanian musician

== See also ==
- Novac, a village in Argetoaia commune, Dolj County, Romania
- Novaci (disambiguation)
