= David Novak (disambiguation) =

David Novak (born 1941) is an American theologian and philosopher.

David Novak may also refer to:

- David C. Novak (born 1952), American businessman and philanthropist
- David J. Novak (born 1961), American judge
- David Novák (born 1979), Czech footballer
- Dávid Novák, 18th-century Hungarian poet
- David Novak, singer and guitarist of the Australian rock duo Polish Club
