= Gruia Novac =

Romanian water polo player

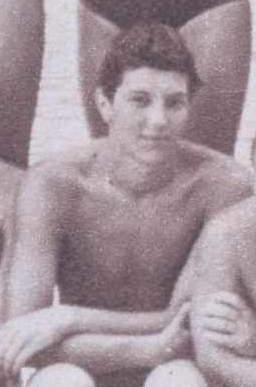
- Gruia Novac in 1963

Personal information
- Nationality: Romanian
- Born: 24 January 1944 Bucharest, Romania
- Died: 1999 (aged 54–55)

Sport
- Sport: Water polo

Gruia Novac (24 January 1944 – 1999) was a Romanian water polo player. He competed at the 1964 Summer Olympics and the 1972 Summer Olympics.
