= Eddie Royal =

American football player (born 1986)

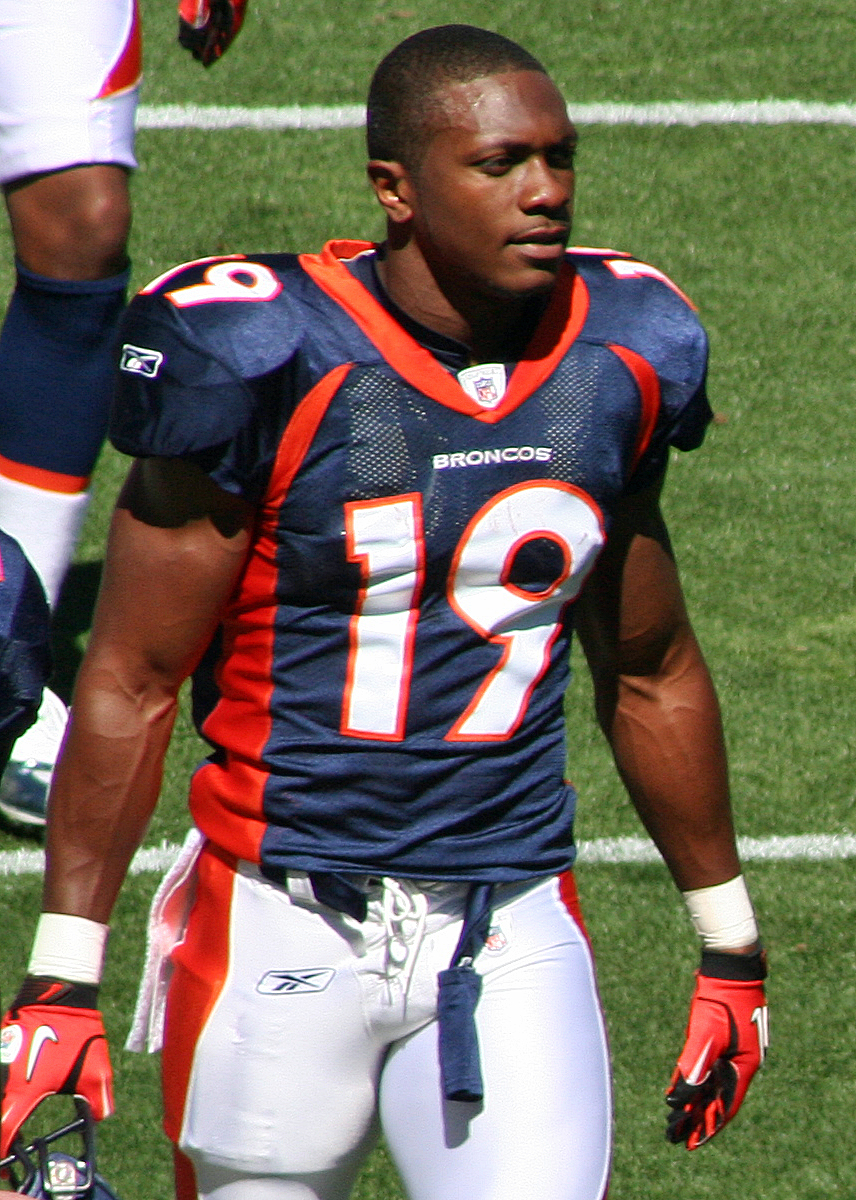
- Royal with the Denver Broncos in 2010

No. 19, 11
- Position: Wide receiver

Personal information
- Born: May 21, 1986 (age 40); Alexandria, Virginia, U.S.
- Listed height: 5 ft 10 in (1.78 m)
- Listed weight: 182 lb (83 kg)

Career information
- High school: Westfield (Chantilly, Virginia)
- College: Virginia Tech (2004–2007)
- NFL draft: 2008: 2nd round, 42nd overall pick

Career history
- Denver Broncos (2008–2011); San Diego Chargers (2012–2014); Chicago Bears (2015–2016)

Awards and highlights
- PFWA All-Rookie Team (2008); First-team All-ACC (2007); Second-team All-ACC (2006)

Career NFL statistics
- Receptions: 408
- Receiving yards: 4,357
- Receiving touchdowns: 28
- Return yards: 2,729
- Return touchdowns: 4
- Stats at Pro Football Reference

William Edward Royal (born May 21, 1986) is an American former professional football player who was a wide receiver and return specialist for nine seasons in the National Football League (NFL). He was selected by the Denver Broncos in the second round of the 2008 NFL draft. He played college football for the Virginia Tech Hokies and was elected to its sports hall of fame in 2018. Royal also played for the San Diego Chargers and Chicago Bears.

== Early life ==
Royal first attended South Lakes High School before going to Westfield High School in Chantilly, Virginia, where he played for most of his high school football career. He received All-America honors from PrepStar and SuperPrep (who named Royal the top high school player in the state of Virginia). He also earned The Washington Post All-Metropolitan player of the year, 1st team All-met, 1st team All-state, 1st team All-region, and 1st team All-district honors. While a senior at Westfield High School, Royal, along with future Virginia Tech teammate Sean Glennon and future West Point fullback Max Palmatier and future Penn State running back Evan Royster, led his team to an undefeated season record (14–0) en route to the Virginia Division 6 AAA State Championship.

While at Westfield, Royal also competed in track & field. He posted bests of 6.48 seconds in the 55-meter dash and 6.52 meters (21–3.75) in the long jump.

== College career ==
Royal played for the Virginia Tech Hokies from 2004 to 2007. He had 2,004 yards from scrimmage in four years, averaging 14.0 yards per play. In addition to those yards, as of 2021, he still held the record for most career punt return yards with 1,296 and was third in career kickoff return yards with 1,376.

In 2004, Royal received freshman All-America honors from The NFL Draft Report after hauling in 28 passes for 470 yards (16.8 avg.) with three touchdowns in 12 games (11 starts) as a true freshman. He returned 25 punts for 274 yards (11.0 avg.) and gained 346 yards on 12 kickoff returns (28.8 avg.) and totaled 1,101 all-purpose yards.

Royal started all 13 games as a sophomore in 2005, finishing third on Virginia Tech with 27 receptions for 315 yards (11.7 avg.) with two scores while adding 10 rushes for 79 yards with one touchdown. He returned 32 punts for 263 yards (8.2 avg.) and 14 kickoffs for 293 yards (20.9 avg.) to account for 950 all-purpose yards.

Royal played 13 games (9 starts) during his junior year in 2006 and picked up second-team All-Atlantic Coast Conference honors while being named an honorable mention All-American by Sports Illustrated. Royal caught 31 passes for 497 yards (16.0 avg.) with three touchdowns, he led the ACC and ranked 12th in the nation with a 13.2-yard punt return average (23–304) with one touchdown. He added 431 yards on 19 kickoff returns (22.7 avg.) and five rushes for 24 yards. He threw a 53-yard touchdown on a trick play against Georgia Bulldogs in the Peach Bowl. Royal finished with 1,256 all-purpose yards (96.7 ypg.).

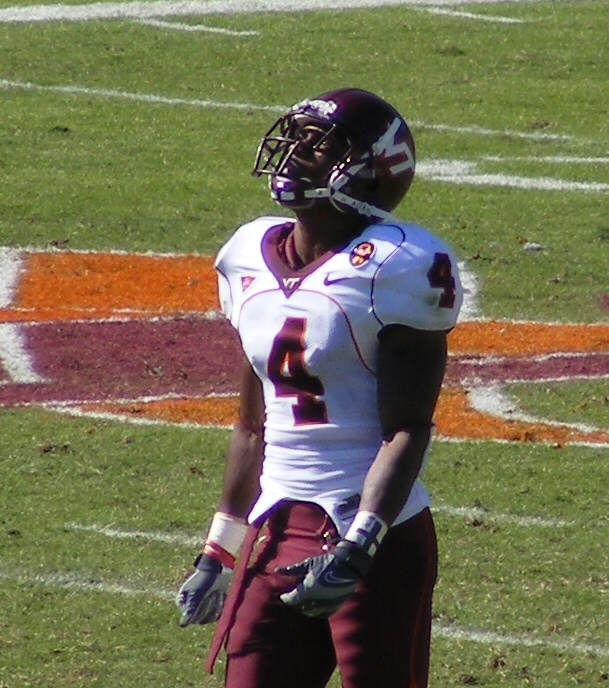
Royal during his tenure at Virginia Tech.

He played 13 games with 11 starts in 2007, earning first-team All-Atlantic Coast Conference honors and second-team All-America accolades from The NFL Draft Report, he posted career highs in receptions (33–496) and receiving touchdowns (4). He led the ACC and ranked 10th in the nation with a 14.7-yard punt return average (31–455) and scored two touchdowns on punt returns. He added 14 kickoff returns for 316 yards (22.6 avg.) and eight rushes for 112 yards (14.0 avg.). Finishing with 1,379 all-purpose yards (106.1 ypg.), he finished first in career all-purpose yards in school history (4,686). He was also the Atlantic Coast Conference's (ACC) all-time leader in punt return yards (1,296). Royal received second-team All-ACC honors in 2006 and first-team All-ACC honors in 2007. The Hokies won the Coastal division and secured a bid the 2007 ACC Championship Game in Jacksonville, Florida, there, they faced a rematch with Boston College, champions of the Atlantic Division. Matt Ryan was unable to seize the victory with two fourth-quarter interceptions, sealed the Hokie win and an automatic bid to the Orange Bowl game. Royal finished the game with four receptions, 63 yards, and one touchdown. He also played in the 2008 Orange Bowl against Kansas.

== Professional career ==
Pre-draft measurables
Height	Weight	Arm length	Hand span	40-yard dash	10-yard split	20-yard split	20-yard shuttle	Three-cone drill	Vertical jump	Broad jump	Bench press
5 ft 9 5/8 in (1.77 m)	184 lb (83 kg)	31 in (0.79 m)	8 5/8 in (0.22 m)	4.39 s	1.48 s	2.55 s	4.34 s	7.07 s	36.0 in (0.91 m)	10 ft 4 in (3.15 m)	24 reps
All values from NFL Combine

=== Denver Broncos ===
Royal was selected in the second round (42nd overall) of the 2008 NFL draft by the Denver Broncos.

Royal started and played in his first NFL regular season game on September 8, 2008, in a 41–14 road win over the Oakland Raiders. He had nine receptions for 146 yards and one touchdown in his debut. Royal's 146 receiving yards were the most by any wide receiver in the first week of the 2008 NFL regular season. His nine receptions were the most by a rookie making his debut for the Broncos. Royal's first career touchdown catch came in the first quarter of the game on a 26-yard pass from former Broncos quarterback Jay Cutler. Royal's opening week performance yielded voters on NFL.com to select him as the Diet Pepsi NFL Rookie of the Week out of five finalists.

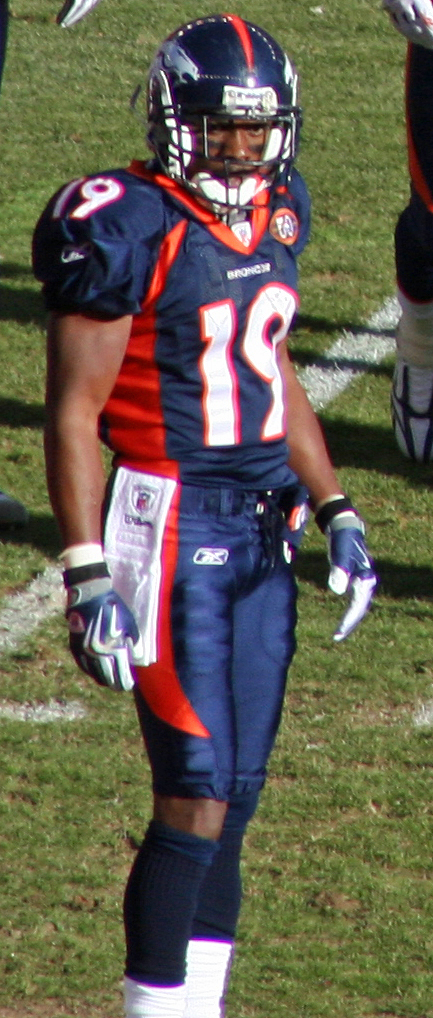
The versatile Eddie Royal played four seasons for the Broncos. Royal is pictured at a game in December 2009.

In Royal's second game of the season, he caught five passes for 37 yards and one touchdown, as part of a 39–38 Broncos home win over the San Diego Chargers. His touchdown catch came with 24 seconds left in the game on a 4th and 4 from San Diego's four-yard-line. The catch made the score 38–37 Chargers; however, the Broncos subsequently went for a two-point conversion, in which Royal caught a pass from Cutler, thus, giving the Broncos a one-point victory. In Week 10, a game in which the Broncos defeated the Cleveland Browns on the road in comeback fashion, 34–30, Royal caught six passes for 164 yards, including a 93-yard touchdown pass. The performance earned him the honor of Diet Pepsi NFL Rookie of the Week for the second time in his career.

On November 30, 2008, in a 34–17 Broncos road victory over the New York Jets, Royal set a franchise record for most touchdowns (5) and receiving yards (757) for a rookie in one season after catching five passes for 84 yards and a touchdown.

Royal's 91 receptions are third most in NFL history for a rookie, behind Puka Nacua and Anquan Boldin. His 980 yards and five touchdowns are both Broncos rookie records. He was seventh in the league among wide receivers in receptions, and sixth in the NFL in total yards.

Early in the 2009 season, Royal became the fourth fastest player in NFL history to reach 100 career receptions.

On October 19, 2009, Royal became the first player in Broncos history, and only the 11th player to date in National Football League history, to return a kickoff (93 yards) and a punt (71 yards) for touchdowns in the same game, leading undefeated Denver to a 34–23 win over the San Diego Chargers. He finished the 2009 season with 37 receptions for 345 receiving yards in 14 games and 12 starts.

In the 2010 season, Royal had 59 receptions for 627 receiving yards and three receiving touchdowns in 16 games and ten starts. In the 2011 season, Royal played 12 games and started eight. He had 19 receptions for 155 receiving yards and one touchdown.

=== San Diego Chargers ===
On March 15, 2012, Royal signed a three-year contract with the San Diego Chargers worth $13.5 million, $6 million of which is guaranteed. He contributed as a slot receiver while handling the team's punt return responsibilities. But a series of setbacks hampered the beginning of his career in San Diego. Royal suffered a groin injury during the first day of training camp and shortly thereafter, his mom fell ill and he found himself making several trips home to Virginia to be by her side. Despite the slow start in San Diego, Royal finished the year strong and his best games were during the end of the season.

In 2013, Royal reunited with new Chargers head coach Mike McCoy, his old offensive coordinator in Denver. Through the first eight games, Royal was among the league leaders in touchdowns with seven. He finished the 2013 season with 631 yards and a career-high in touchdowns with eight.

In 2014, Royal played one of the biggest roles in bringing former Virginia Tech teammate and Kansas City Chiefs cornerback Brandon Flowers to the Chargers. Royal, along with his teammates, sold Flowers on the city and fans. They emphasized how they were trying to build something great and how he would be another piece to the puzzle. He finished the 2014 season with 62 receptions for 778 receiving yards and seven receiving touchdowns.

=== Chicago Bears ===
On March 11, 2015, Royal signed a three-year, $15 million deal with $10 million guaranteed with the Chicago Bears. In 2015, Royal had just 37 catches for 238 yards and one touchdown in his first season in Chicago after being limited to nine games due to injuries.

On September 11, 2016, Royal caught his first touchdown of the season in the season-opening loss to the Houston Texans. On October 2, Royal caught 7 passes for 111 yards and a touchdown against the Detroit Lions, his first 100+ yard game since 2014. As well as catching a touchdown pass, Royal also caught a single pass for a 64-yard gain. He suffered a foot injury in mid-October that limited him throughout the season before being placed on injured reserve on December 19. In 2016, he appeared in nine games and caught 33 passes for 369 yards with two touchdowns. He had foot surgery in late December 2016.

On May 11, 2017, Royal was released by the Bears.

=== Career statistics ===
Receiving

Year	Team	G	Rec	Targets	Yards	Avg	Long	TD	First Downs	Fumb	FumbL
2008	DEN	15	91	129	980	10.8	93	5	43	1	1
2009	DEN	14	37	79	345	9.3	20	0	23	0	0
2010	DEN	16	59	105	627	10.6	41	3	32	1	0
2011	DEN	12	19	49	155	8.2	26	1	8	0	0
2012	SD	10	23	44	234	10.2	31	1	15	0	0
2013	SD	15	47	67	631	13.4	54	8	33	0	0
2014	SD	16	62	91	778	12.5	47	7	39	1	1
2015	CHI	9	37	50	238	6.4	30	1	9	0	0
2016	CHI	5	25	20	284	11.4	64	2	9	0	0
Total		112	400	634	4,272	10.7	93	28	202	3	2

Returning

Returns			Punt returns					Kick returns				
Year	Team	G	Returns	Yards	TD	Fair Caught	Long	Attempts	Yards	TD	Fair Caught	Long
2008	DEN	15	14	140	0	10	36	23	600	0	0	95
2009	DEN	14	30	335	1	13	71	26	621	1	0	93
2010	DEN	16	25	298	0	12	33	5	107	0	0	33
2011	DEN	12	12	194	1	9	85	3	47	0	0	20
2012	SD	10	12	64	0	2	14	0	0	0	0	0
2013	SD	15	7	41	0	7	12	0	0	0	0	0
2014	SD	16	11	100	0	6	58	0	0	0	1	0
2015	CHI	9	1	16	0	0	16	0	0	0	0	0
2016	CHI	9	19	166	1	0	65	0	0	0	0	0
Total		107	112	1,188	3	59	85	57	1375	1	1	95

Rushing

Year	Team	Games	Att	Yards	Avg	Long	TD	First Downs	Fumb	FumbL
2008	DEN	15	11	109	9.9	71	0	3	0	0
2009	DEN	14	1	1	1.0	1	0	0	0	0
2010	DEN	16	6	61	10.2	20	0	4	1	1
2011	DEN	12	7	48	6.9	11	0	3	0	0
2012	SD	10	3	22	7.3	11	0	2	0	0
2013	SD	15	3	21	7.0	15	0	1	0	0
2014	SD	16	3	14	4.7	15	0	1	0	0
2015	CHI	9	1	−1	−1.0	−1	0	0	0	0
Total		107	35	275	7.9	71	0	14	1	1

=== Franchise records ===
As of 2022's NFL off-season, Eddie Royal held at least seven Broncos franchise records, including:

- Receptions: rookie season (91 in 2008), rookie game (11 on December 28, 2008, against the San Diego Chargers)
- Receiving Yds: rookie season (980 in 2008)
- Rec Yds/Game: rookie season (65.3 in 2008)
- Kick Return Touchdowns: game (1 on October 19, 2009, against the San Diego Chargers; with 9 others)
- Total Return Yards: game (235 on October 19, 2009, against the San Diego Chargers)
- 100+ yard receiving games: rookie season (3)

== Personal life ==
Eddie started playing football at a young age with the Reston Youth Association before later attending Westfield High School.

Royal's older brother, Chris Royal, played professional football as well. His sister, Lt. Col. Christina Royal, is a graduate of the Virginia Tech Corps of Cadets where she served as regimental commander and now serves with the United States Air Force.
