= Novaci (Aleksandrovac) =

- Village
- Location within Serbia
- Coordinates: 43°27′41″N 21°08′25″E
- Country: Serbia
- District: Rasina District
- Municipality: Aleksandrovac
- Time zone: UTC+1 (CET)
  - Summer (DST): UTC+2 (CEST)

Novaci (Serbian Cyrillic: Новаци) is a village in the municipality of Aleksandrovac, Serbia. According to the 2002 census, the village has a population of 402.

== See also ==
- List of places in Serbia
