= Craig Aukerman =

American football coach (born 1976)

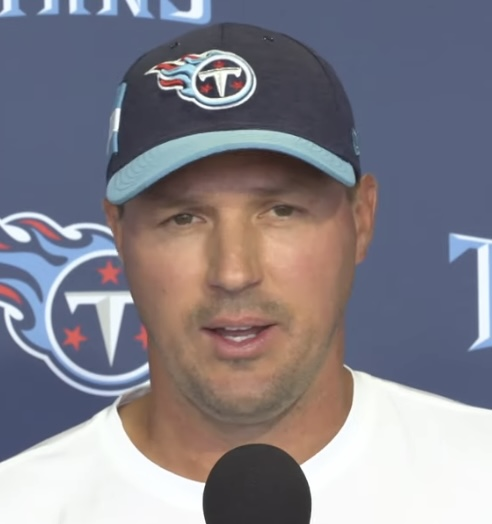
- Aukerman with the Tennessee Titans in 2021

Atlanta Falcons
- Title: Special teams coordinator

Personal information
- Born: November 22, 1976 (age 49); McComb, Ohio, U.S.

Career information
- Positions: Defensive back, wide receiver
- College: University of Findlay

Career history
- Findlay (2000) Wide receivers coach; Miami (OH) (2001–2002) Graduate assistant; Western Kentucky (2003–2004) Special teams coordinator & linebackers coach; Miami (OH) (2005–2008) Special teams coordinator & linebackers coach; Kent State (2009) Linebackers coach; Denver Broncos (2010) Defensive assistant; Jacksonville Jaguars (2011) Defensive assistant; Jacksonville Jaguars (2012) Assistant special teams coordinator; Tennessee Titans (2013–2015) Assistant special teams coordinator; San Diego Chargers (2016) Special teams coordinator; Tennessee Titans (2017) Assistant special teams coordinator; Tennessee Titans (2018–2023) Special teams coordinator; Miami Dolphins (2025) Special teams coordinator; Atlanta Falcons (2026–present) Special teams coordinator

Awards and highlights
- 2× NAIA national champion (1995, 1997); 2× NAIA All-American (1997, 1998)

Craig Aukerman (born November 22, 1976) is an American football coach who serves as special teams coordinator for the Atlanta Falcons of the National Football League (NFL). He previously served in that same position for the San Diego Chargers, Tennessee Titans, and Miami Dolphins.

== Playing career ==
Aukerman played college football at the University of Findlay, where he played defensive back and wide receiver from 1995 to 1998. He was a member of the Findlay teams that won the NAIA national championship in 1995 and 1997. He was an All-American in both 1997 and 1998. Aukerman also played baseball as a junior.

== Coaching career ==
=== College coaching ===
Aukerman began his coaching career at his alma mater the University of Findlay where he served as a wide receivers coach. For the next two years he was with the Miami RedHawks working as a graduate assistant. He then went on to the Hilltoppers only to return to Miami after two years. After four more seasons with Miami, in 2009 Aukerman served as the linebackers at Kent State.

=== NFL coaching ===
Aukerman broke into the NFL as a defensive assistant for the 2010 Denver Broncos only to leave after a year and join the Jacksonville Jaguars in the same capacity. In 2012, he was transitioned to become an assistant special teams coach instead of defense with the Jaguars. In 2013, Aukerman went out west to San Diego and joined the Chargers. His first three years with the organization he worked as an assistant special teams coach, but in 2016 he was given the coordinator role.

In 2017, Aukerman joined the Titans as an assistant special teams coach but was given the coordinator title by Mike Vrabel the following year. On December 4, 2023, Aukerman was fired following a disastrous 31-28 Week 13 overtime loss to the Indianapolis Colts. The game featured a critical missed extra point attempt and two consecutive punts being blocked; the first of which was returned for a touchdown while the second resulted in a season-ending injury of punter Ryan Stonehouse.

On January 29, 2025, the Miami Dolphins named Aukerman as their special teams coordinator.

On January 26, 2026, the Atlanta Falcons hired Aukerman as their new special teams coordinator under head coach Kevin Stefanski.

== Personal life ==
Aukerman and his wife, Summer, both attended rural high schools in Ohio. They met while he was working as a graduate assistant at the University of Miami (Ohio), and she was a volleyball player studying special education. They have two children, Cayden and Bryce.
