= Martin Novák =

Czech ice hockey player

- Born: November 2, 1988 (age 36); Czechoslovakia
- Height: 6 ft 3 in (191 cm)
- Weight: 196 lb (89 kg; 14 st 0 lb)
- Position: Forward
- Shoots: Left
- Czech 1.liga team Former teams: LHK Jestřábi Prostějov; HC Slovan Bratislava; HC Sparta Praha
- Playing career: 2006–present

Martin Novák (born November 2, 1988) is a Czech professional ice hockey player. He is currently playing for LHK Jestřábi Prostějov of the Czech 1.liga.

Novák made his Czech Extraliga debut playing with HC Slovan Bratislava during the 2007-08 Czech Extraliga season.
