= David Novák =

Czech footballer (born 1979)

Personal information
- Date of birth: 11 January 1979 (age 47)
- Place of birth: Czechoslovakia
- Position: Defender

Senior career*
Years	Team	Apps	(Gls)
1997–2001	FC Viktoria Plzeň	43	(1)

International career
1997–1998	Czech Republic U18	7	(0)
2000	Czech Republic U20	1	(1)
2000	Czech Republic U21	3	(0)
- * Club domestic league appearances and goals

David Novák (born 11 January 1979) is a retired Czech football player who played in the Czech First League for FC Viktoria Plzeň.
