= Ron Milus =

American football coach (born 1963)

Personal information
- Born: November 25, 1963 (age 62); Tacoma, Washington, U.S.

Career information
- Positions: Cornerback, return specialist
- High school: Washington
- College: Washington

Career history
- Washington (1993–1999) Defensive backs coach; Denver Broncos (2000–2002) Defensive backs coach; Arizona Cardinals (2003) Defensive backs coach; New York Giants (2004–2005) Secondary coach; St. Louis Rams (2006–2008) Secondary coach; Carolina Panthers (2009–2010) Defensive backs coach; Denver Broncos (2011–2012) Defensive backs coach; San Diego / Los Angeles Chargers (2013–2020) Defensive backs coach; Las Vegas Raiders (2021) Defensive backs coach; Indianapolis Colts (2022–2024) Defensive backs coach; Jacksonville Jaguars (2025) Defensive backs coach

Awards and highlights
- National championship (1991)

Ron Milus (born November 25, 1963) is an American football coach. Milus has been a football coach in the National Football League (NFL) and was the defensive backs coach for the Los Angeles Chargers from 2013 to 2020.

== Playing career ==
Played four seasons for the Huskies as a cornerback and return specialist in from 1982 to 1985. He also coached at his alma mater winning a national championship.

== Coaching career ==
Milus spent the 2025 season as the defensive backs coach for the Jacksonville Jaguars. On January 20, 2026, Milus was fired by Jacksonville.
