= Nick Novak =

American football player (born 1981)

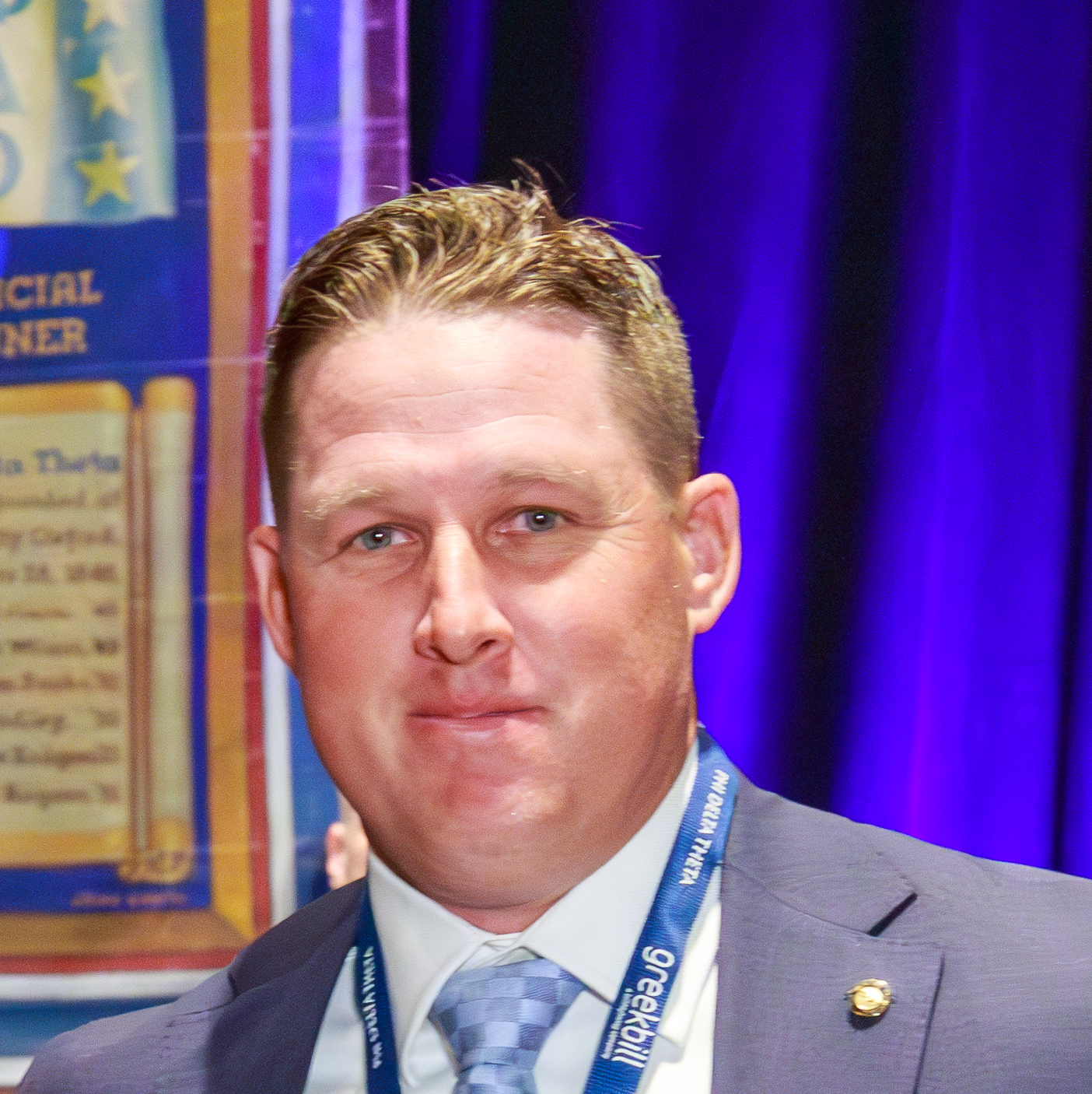
- Novak in 2023

No. 3, 1, 9, 8
- Position: Placekicker

Personal information
- Born: August 21, 1981 (age 45); San Diego, California, U.S.
- Listed height: 5 ft 11 in (1.80 m)
- Listed weight: 202 lb (92 kg)

Career information
- High school: Albemarle (Charlottesville, Virginia)
- College: Maryland (2000–2004)
- NFL draft: 2005: undrafted

Career history
- Chicago Bears (2005)*; Dallas Cowboys (2005)*; Washington Redskins (2005); Arizona Cardinals (2005); Washington Redskins (2006); Chicago Bears (2007)*; → Cologne Centurions (2007); Kansas City Chiefs (2008); San Diego Chargers (2010)*; Florida Tuskers (2010); New York Jets (2011)*; San Diego Chargers (2011–2014); Houston Texans (2015–2016); Los Angeles Chargers (2017); Birmingham Iron (2019); Los Angeles Wildcats (2020)
- * Offseason or practice squad member only

Awards and highlights
- San Diego/LA Chargers 2010s All-Decade Team; 2× First-team All-ACC (2002, 2003); 2004 ACC Jim Tatum Award Recipient and University of Maryland Lefrak Scholar; UFL Special Teams Most Valuable Player (2010); UFL record 54-yard field goal

Career NFL statistics
- Field goals made: 182
- Field goals attempted: 222
- Field goal %: 82.0
- Longest field goal: 53
- Extra points: 256 / 263
- Stats at Pro Football Reference

Nicholas Ryan Novak (born August 21, 1981) is an American former professional football player who was a placekicker in the National Football League (NFL). He played college football for the Maryland Terrapins and was signed by the Chicago Bears as an undrafted free agent in 2005.

Novak was a member of the Dallas Cowboys, Washington Redskins, Arizona Cardinals, Kansas City Chiefs, San Diego / Los Angeles Chargers, New York Jets, and Houston Texans of the NFL, as well as the Cologne Centurions of NFL Europe, the Florida Tuskers of the United Football League (UFL), the Birmingham Iron of the Alliance of American Football (AAF), and the Los Angeles Wildcats of the XFL.

== Early life ==
Novak was born and raised in San Diego, California. After moving to Charlottesville, Virginia in 1994, he attended Albemarle High School, where he was a letterman in football, soccer, and tennis. In football, Novak was a three-year varsity letterman, twice garnering All-District and All-Daily Progress honors, and winning All-State honors following his sophomore and senior seasons. He was also an All-District central defender on Albemarle's soccer team. On May 4, 2018, Novak was inducted into the Albemarle High School Hall of Fame.

== College career ==
Novak attended the University of Maryland. It was during a nationally televised game in 2001 against Georgia Tech that the then-redshirt freshman established himself, successfully completing a 46-yard field goal to send the game into overtime, and earning his nickname, "The Kick". In the second stanza, Novak connected on a 26-yard field goal that ultimately won the game for a resurgent Terrapin team. Novak would go on to establish himself as one of the more consistent and clutch kickers in the country; his leg keyed comeback victories against North Carolina State in 2002 and 2003. Accordingly, Novak was frequently an all-conference specialist and a mainstay on the Lou Groza watchlist. During the first game of his senior season, Novak became the ACC's all-time leading scorer, kicking a field goal and allowing him to surpass Scott Bentley's career total of 324 points. Novak ultimately ended his college career with 393 points, which was best in the league and fifth-best all-time amongst kickers in the NCAA at the time of his graduation.

Novak was awarded the Jim Tatum Award by the ACC, given annually to the top senior student-athlete among the league's football players. He is one of only three Maryland players to receive that award since its inception in 1979. Maryland Coach Ralph Freidgen said, "I don't think there could have been a more deserving recipient for the Tatum Award than Nick Novak. Everything he does in his life is toward the goal of perfection. It has been a pleasure to see the effort that he has given both on the field and in the classroom and he is a tremendous example of the type of person and player we are looking for at the University of Maryland."

While at Maryland, Novak was a two-time member of the All-ACC Academic Football team, a three-time member of the ACC Honor Roll and made Maryland's Dean's List on three occasions. He is a three-time CoSida Academic All-District selection and was named the 2004 LeFrak Scholar, an honor given to a Maryland football player, basketball player, and track athlete who "exhibits extraordinary athletic ability, leadership and athletic achievement."

Novak was also a member of the Maryland Alpha chapter of Phi Delta Theta at The University of Maryland in College Park. In 2007, he was selected to be commemorated in a special edition poster recognizing the top 30 figures in Maryland football history entitled "A Winning Tradition", "honoring and paying tribute to the players and coaches who made a significant impact on the Maryland Football Program, both on and off the field over the past fifty plus years."

== Professional career ==
=== Chicago Bears (first stint) ===
Novak signed with the Chicago Bears on April 29, 2005, as an undrafted free agent. He was waived on August 29.

=== Dallas Cowboys ===
Novak was then signed by the Dallas Cowboys on August 30, 2005, and was waived four days later.

=== Washington Redskins (first stint) ===
Novak signed with the Washington Redskins in September 2005, and appeared in five games, notably hitting a game-winning extra point in the narrow season-opening 14–13 road victory over the Dallas Cowboys on Monday Night Football and coming through with a game-saving tackle on the ensuing kickoff. Three weeks later in a 20–17 victory over the Seattle Seahawks, he kicked a game-winning field goal in overtime, which kept the Redskins undefeated and atop the NFC East. Since Novak was signed that year for the limited purpose of filling in for an ailing John Hall, he was released shortly after Hall returned to form.

=== Arizona Cardinals ===
Shortly after his release from the Redskins, Novak was signed by the Arizona Cardinals for kickoff duties while Neil Rackers hobbled through the latter half of the 2005 season. Novak appeared in five games for the Cardinals in 2005 and was 3 for 3 on field goal attempts.

=== Washington Redskins (second stint) ===
After spending the 2006 preseason with the Cardinals, he re-signed with the Redskins on October 10, 2006, again replacing injured kicker John Hall. During a Week 9 22–19 victory over the Dallas Cowboys, after Novak missed a 49-yard field goal with 35 seconds left, Redskins safety Troy Vincent blocked a Cowboys field goal; Sean Taylor picked the ball up and ran it all the way to the Dallas 45-yard line. Then, a facemask penalty was called which moved the ball to the Cowboys’ 30-yard line and gave the Redskins one more play with no time on the clock. Novak then kicked a 47-yard game-winning field goal. It was subsequently ranked the fourth greatest moment in FedExField history by Redskins.com. On December 4, the Redskins released Novak in favor of Shaun Suisham.

=== Chicago Bears (second stint) and NFL Europe ===
After the end of the 2006 season, Novak was signed by the Chicago Bears and allocated to NFL Europa, serving as the placekicker for the Cologne Centurions in NFL Europa's final season. He had a successful campaign in Europe, including a game-winner for the third-place Centurions. After an impressive preseason with the Bears, Novak was released due to the presence of All-Pro kicker Robbie Gould.

=== Kansas City Chiefs ===
Novak was signed by the Kansas City Chiefs on February 18, 2008, after auditioning for several teams in the 2007 season, including the San Diego Chargers, Jacksonville Jaguars, and Chiefs.

On September 28, 2008, Novak kicked four field goals in a 33–19 victory over the Denver Broncos.

On October 21, 2008, Novak was cut after missing two field goals during a Week 6 34–10 loss to the Tennessee Titans.

=== San Diego Chargers (first stint) ===
On April 29, 2010, Novak signed with the reigning AFC West Champion San Diego Chargers to provide depth behind Nate Kaeding. After matching Kaeding, but ultimately losing out to the incumbent, the Chargers released Novak in the final round of preseason cuts.

=== Florida Tuskers ===
The Florida Tuskers of the United Football League signed Novak for the 2010 season. In his league debut against the Las Vegas Locomotives, Novak set the UFL record for the longest field goal with a 54-yarder. He also made a 23-yard field goal and three-point after touchdown kicks. For his performance, Novak was named the UFL Special Teams Player of the Week. Against Hartford in Week 4, he was again named UFL Special Teams Player of the Week when he connected on field goals of 29, 42, 24, and 38 yards, in a close Tusker victory. Novak's four field goals were a single-game United Football League record, as were his 15 overall points.

In the regular season, Novak led the league in points with 69, was 15–18 on field goals and holds every league and career place-kicking record in UFL history. He added on two field goals and two extra points in the UFL Championship to push his overall point total to 77 and his final field goal total to 17/21. On November 24, Novak was named the UFL Special Teams MVP for the 2010 season.

Notably, in mid-October 2010, the Chargers wanted to sign Novak to replace an injured Nate Kaeding. Novak beat out three other kickers in a tryout for the position at Charger Park. However, there were games still remaining in the UFL season and Novak remained under contract with the Tuskers. The Chargers were willing to pay the UFL required release fee of $150,000 to get him, but the UFL denied the request in order to keep Novak through the end of its season.

=== New York Jets ===
On February 9, 2011, Novak signed with the New York Jets to compete with incumbent Nick Folk. The New York Daily News chronicled his attempt to make the Jets' roster in an August 2011 feature entitled, "'Journeyman Nick Novak Gives Incumbent Nick Folk a Run for Starting Job in Jets Camp." Novak was waived by the Jets after the final pre-season game on August 30.

=== San Diego Chargers (second stint) ===
==== 2011 season ====
On September 13, 2011, Novak was re-signed to a two-year contract with the Chargers after Nate Kaeding suffered an ACL injury to his left knee on the opening kickoff against the Minnesota Vikings.

In 2011, Novak made 27 of 34 field goals and set team records for field goals of 40 yards (12) and 50 yards (4) or longer. He established an NFL career-high with a 53-yard field goal, and two of his three onside kicks were recovered. Novak also made a career-high five field goals during a Week 5 29–24 road victory over the Denver Broncos.

==== 2012 season ====
Novak competed for the Chargers job in the preseason and had a strong showing before losing out to Kaeding. Novak was released on August 31.

On September 29, 2012, the Chargers re-signed Novak after Kaeding suffered a groin injury. Novak filled in for three games and became the permanent kicker after Kaeding was released in late October. During a Week 14 34–24 victory over the Pittsburgh Steelers, Novak became only the fourth kicker in Heinz Field history to make a field goal of more than 50 yards there. The victory was the first ever regular season win for the Chargers over the Steelers at Pittsburgh.

Novak's 18/20 (90%) field goal percentage during the 2012 regular season was the third most efficient campaign in Chargers history. His two misses were from 54 and 55 yards. Novak converted his other two attempts from beyond 50 yards. He was 33 of 33 on extra points and 50% of his onside kicks were recovered (NFL average is around 20%). Novak also had 22 touchbacks out of 60 kickoffs with the opponents average starting field position being the 21.6 yard-line. Of 30 NFL kickers and Special Teams Units with at least 30 kickoffs in 2012, only four had a better average kickoff starting field position than Novak and the Chargers (19.9 – Browns, 20.6 – Bears, 20.8 – Vikings and 21.4 – Ravens). Novak and the Chargers ranked at various spots in the top three in average kick-off starting field position for the majority of the year.

==== 2013 season ====
During a narrow Week 2 33–30 road victory over the Philadelphia Eagles, Novak drilled a tie-breaking 45-yard field goal in the final seconds. During a Week 6 19–9 victory over the Indianapolis Colts on Monday Night Football, he capped off a 4–4 night with a 50-yard field goal in the final two minutes to seal the victory. In the regular-season finale against the Kansas City Chiefs, Novak kicked a game-winning 36-yard field goal in overtime that turned out to be the game-winner in the Chargers' 27–24 playoff-clinching victory.

In 2013, Novak set a new single-season efficiency record, connecting on 34 of 37 field goals (91.9%) for the playoff-bound Chargers. He also converted all 42 extra point attempts. Novak's 34 field goals tied John Carney's single-season record for kicks made (34 of 38 in 1994). He was 11-for-11 on kicks over 40 yards.

==== 2014 season ====
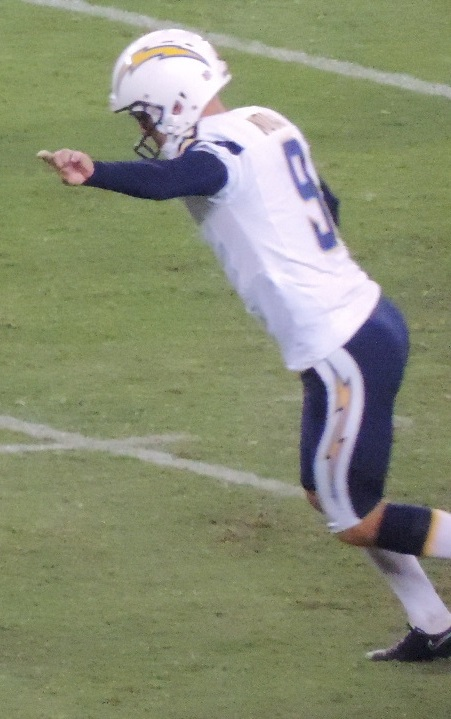
Novak with the San Diego Chargers in 2014

During a Week 3 22–10 road victory over the Buffalo Bills, Novak made two field goals to extend his streak of successful field goal attempts to 23, passing Nate Kaeding for second in Chargers history behind Carney's 29. Novak surpassed Carney later in the season, extending his streak to 32.

During a Week 14 23–14 loss to the New England Patriots, Novak filled in as a punter after replacing the injured Mike Scifres. Two weeks later against the San Francisco 49ers, he kicked a game-winning 40-yard field goal in overtime to keep the Chargers in contention for a playoff berth as the Chargers won by a score of 38–35. Novak finished the 2014 season converting all 40 extra point attempts and 22 of 26 field goal attempts.

==== 2015 season ====
On September 5, 2015, Novak was released in the final round of preseason cuts in favor of undrafted rookie Josh Lambo. He did not have a touchback in the final half of 2014, while Lambo displayed a strong leg during exhibition games.

Novak converted 101 of 117 (86.3%) field goals in his four seasons with the Chargers. He ended up sixth on the all-time Chargers scoring list with 503 points, passing Lance Alworth's 500 points.

=== Houston Texans ===
==== 2015 season ====
Novak signed with the Houston Texans on September 29, 2015. In 13 regular season games, he was 18 of 21 on field goals, good for 85.7%, with his three misses coming from beyond 50 yards. It was the fourth most efficient season in Texans' history. Novak's longest make was from 51 yards, and he was 29 of 31 on extra points (93.5%), above the league average of 93.36%, from the new 33-yard extra point distance. Of the 32 NFL kickers who took at least 20 extra points in 2015, 15 missed less than two, and the average number of total misses was 2.09. Novak had his best year statistically for touchbacks, getting 23 on 62 kickoffs. The opponents' average starting field position on Novak's 62 kickoffs was the 24-yard-line (tied for 16th out of the 32 active kickers/kick-off specialists and their coverage units as of week 17).

Novak's consistent kicking in 2015 was a key factor in several victories on the way to the Texans' AFC South Championship.

==== 2016 season ====
During a narrow 12–10 Week 16 victory over the Cincinnati Bengals, Novak set new single season Texans' marks for both field goals made (34) and field goals attempted (39). The Texans clinched their second consecutive AFC South Championship with the victory. Novak finished the season converting 22 of 25 extra point attempts and a career-best 35 field goals out of 41 attempts for 85.4%. He finished the season with 127 points, good for the fourth best season point total in Texans history.

During the Wild Card Round against the Oakland Raiders, Novak kicked two field goals, from 50 and 38 yards, and three extra points in the 27–14 victory.

==== 2017 season ====
On March 8, 2017, Novak signed a one-year, $3.15 million contract extension with the Texans.

On September 2, 2017, Novak was released by the Texans in favor of Kaʻimi Fairbairn, who was considered to have a stronger leg.

=== Los Angeles Chargers ===
On October 5, 2017, Novak signed with the Los Angeles Chargers after struggles from rookie Younghoe Koo.

During a narrow Week 6 17–16 road victory over the Oakland Raiders, Novak kicked the game-winning field goal. During a Week 11 54–24 victory over the Buffalo Bills, he scored 18 points and tied Hall of Famer Lance Alworth for sixth on the all-time scoring list, with 500 points as a Charger. Novak passed Alworth with a field goal the following week (503 points). However, in the next game against Dallas Cowboys, Novak suffered a back injury. He was placed on injured reserve on December 2, 2017. Novak finished the season converting 17 of 18 extra points and nine of 13 field goal attempts in seven games.

Novak was named to the 2010s (2010–2019) San Diego/LA Chargers All-Decade Team.

=== Birmingham Iron ===
On August 6, 2018, Novak was signed by the Birmingham Iron of the Alliance of American Football league.

During the 2019 AAF season opener against the Memphis Express, Novak made all four of his field goal attempts in a 26–0 victory. For his performance, Novak was named AAF Special Teams Player of the Week. On March 14, 2019, he kicked a memorable last second game-winner in a 32–29 victory over the Fleet at SDCCU Stadium in San Diego. The league ceased operations in April 2019.

=== Los Angeles Wildcats ===
In October 2019, Novak was selected by the Los Angeles Wildcats in the 2020 XFL draft's open phase. He was placed on injured reserve on March 3, 2020. Novak had his contract terminated when the league suspended operations on April 10.

== NFL career statistics ==
=== Regular season ===
Year	Team	GP	Overall FGs				PATs			Points
Year	Team	GP	FGA	FGM	Pct	Lng	XPA	XPM	Pct	Points
2005	WAS	5	7	5	71.4	40	15	15	100.0	30
2005	ARI	5	3	3	100.0	35	0	0	0.0	9
2006	WAS	6	10	5	50.0	47	10	10	100.0	25
2008	KC	6	10	6	60.0	43	7	7	100.0	25
2011	SD	15	34	27	79.4	53	42	41	97.9	122
2012	SD	13	20	18	90.0	51	33	33	100.0	87
2013	SD	16	37	34	91.9	50	42	42	100.0	144
2014	SD	16	26	22	84.6	52	40	40	100.0	106
2015	HOU	13	21	18	85.7	51	31	29	93.5	83
2016	HOU	16	41	35	85.4	53	25	22	88.0	127
2017	LAC	7	13	9	69.2	50	18	17	94.4	44
Career		118	222	182	82.0	53	263	256	97.3	802

=== Postseason ===
Year	Team	GP	Overall FGs				PATs			Points
Year	Team	GP	FGA	FGM	Pct	Lng	XPA	XPM	Pct	Points
2013	SD	2	4	3	75.0	30	5	5	100.0	14
2015	HOU	1	0	0	0.0	–	0	0	–	0
2016	HOU	2	5	5	100.0	50	4	4	100.0	19
Career		5	9	8	88.9	50	9	9	100.0	33

== Coaching career ==
In July 2021, Novak was named Head Football Coach at Maranatha Christian High School in San Diego, California after a season as Maranatha's Special Teams Coach.

In January 2022, Novak was the Specialist/Assistant Coach on Jeff Fisher's American Team Staff for the NFLPA Collegiate Bowl.

In November 2025, his fifth year as Head Coach, Novak led Maranatha to its first-ever California Interscholastic Federation (CIF) Championship (Division 5-AA), defeating Palo Verde Valley High School, 24-12. Novak was named the Sunset League's 2025 Coach of the Year. Maranatha also received the 2025 CIF San Diego Section Coastal Conference Sportsmanship Award, "presented to the team whose players, coaches, and fans exhibit the principles of good sportsmanship," awarded by the San Diego County Football Officials Association and the CIF San Diego Section.
