= 2013 Kansas City Chiefs season =

NFL team season

- Owner: The Hunt family (Clark Hunt Chairman and CEO)
- General manager: John Dorsey
- Head coach: Andy Reid
- Offensive coordinator: Doug Pederson
- Defensive coordinator: Bob Sutton
- Home stadium: Arrowhead Stadium

Results
- Record: 11–5
- Division place: 2nd AFC West
- Playoffs: Lost Wild Card Playoffs (at Colts) 44–45
- All-Pros: 5: RB Jamaal Charles (1st team); DT Dontari Poe (2nd team); LB Tamba Hali (2nd team); S Eric Berry (1st team); PR Dexter McCluster (2nd team)
- Pro Bowlers: 10: QB Alex Smith; RB Jamaal Charles; T Branden Albert; DT Dontari Poe; LB Tamba Hali; LB Derrick Johnson; LB Justin Houston; CB Brandon Flowers; S Eric Berry; PR Dexter McCluster
- Team MVP: Jamaal Charles
- Team ROY: Marcus Cooper

Uniform
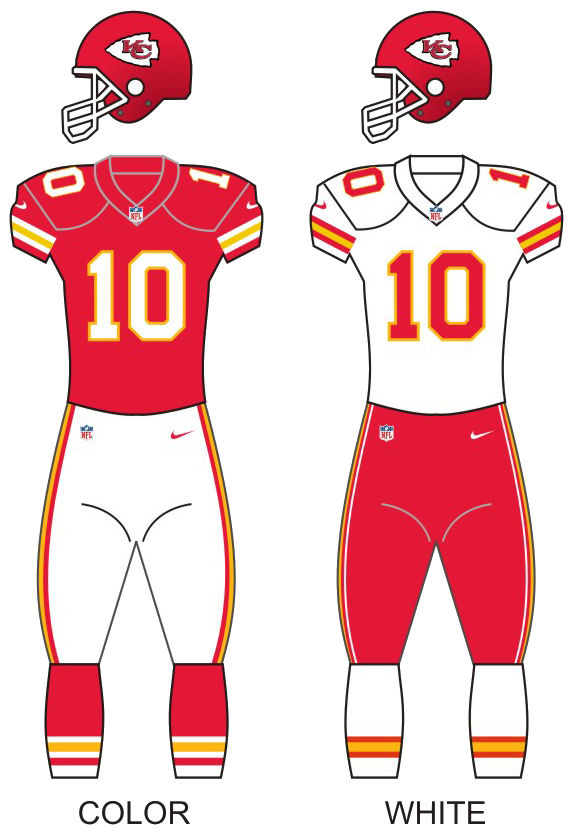

The 2013 season was the Kansas City Chiefs' 44th in the National Football League (NFL), their 54th overall and their first under the head coach and general manager tandem of Andy Reid and John Dorsey respectively. After their 26–16 win over the Philadelphia Eagles in Week 3, which was also coach Andy Reid's first visit to Philadelphia since the Eagles fired him the season prior, the Chiefs vastly improved on their 2–14 record from 2012 just three weeks into the season. However, despite starting 9–0, the Chiefs would struggle in the second half of the season, losing 5 out of their last 7 games, and losing control of the AFC West. Despite that, they would still make the playoffs. After defeating the New York Giants 31–7 in Week 4, the Chiefs became the first team in NFL history to win two or fewer games in the previous season, and win the first four games the next. On October 13, 2013, against the Oakland Raiders, Chiefs fans broke the Guinness World Record for loudest crowd roar at an outdoor stadium with 137.5 decibels. Seattle Seahawks fans later reclaimed the record on December 2, 2013, with a roar of 137.6 decibels. After the Indianapolis Colts defeated the Denver Broncos in Week 7, the Chiefs were the final undefeated team in the NFL. They were the first team in NFL history to earn the number one draft pick and be the last undefeated team in consecutive years.

The Chiefs clinched a playoff berth. They would lose to the Indianapolis Colts in the Wild Card round of the playoffs 45–44, after blowing a 38–10 lead. The loss extended an 8-game playoff losing streak dating back to the 1993 season, which stood as the longest in NFL history until it was broken by the Detroit Lions in 2016.

== Roster changes ==
=== Trades ===
Position	Player/pick received	Team	Compensation
QB	Alex Smith	San Francisco 49ers	2013 2nd round draft pick 2014 2nd round draft pick
FB	Anthony Sherman	Arizona Cardinals	CB Javier Arenas
WR	A. J. Jenkins	San Francisco 49ers	WR Jon Baldwin
N/A	2014 6th round draft pick	Dallas Cowboys	LB Edgar Jones; 2014 7th round draft pick

=== Cuts ===
Position	Player	2013 team
TE	Kevin Boss	None
WR	Steve Breaston	None
QB	Matt Cassel	Minnesota Vikings
FB	Patrick DiMarco	Atlanta Falcons
FB	Nate Eachus	None
LB	Cory Greenwood	Detroit Lions
CB	De'Quan Menzie	None
G	Rich Ranglin	San Jose SaberCats (AFL)
OT	Luke Patterson	New England Patriots
LB	Andy Studebaker	Jacksonville Jaguars
OT	Eric Winston	Arizona Cardinals

=== Free agency ===
Offseason
Position	Player	Status*	2012 team	2013 team
FS	Husain Abdullah	UFA	None	Kansas City Chiefs
CB	Vince Agnew	UFA	Dallas Cowboys	Kansas City Chiefs
OT	Branden Albert	UFA	Kansas City Chiefs	Kansas City Chiefs
WR	Donnie Avery	UFA	Indianapolis Colts	Kansas City Chiefs
WR	Dwayne Bowe	UFA	Kansas City Chiefs	Kansas City Chiefs
P	Dustin Colquitt	UFA	Kansas City Chiefs	Kansas City Chiefs
QB	Chase Daniel	UFA	New Orleans Saints	Kansas City Chiefs
LB	Travis Daniels	UFA	Kansas City Chiefs	None
LB	Zac Diles	UFA	Tennessee Titans	Kansas City Chiefs
DE	Mike DeVito	UFA	New York Jets	Kansas City Chiefs
DE	Glenn Dorsey	UFA	Kansas City Chiefs	San Francisco 49ers
C	Tommie Draheim	UFA	GB / Sea / NE / Jax	Kansas City Chiefs
SS	Abram Elam	UFA	Kansas City Chiefs	None
TE	Anthony Fasano	UFA	Miami Dolphins	Kansas City Chiefs
LS	Thomas Gafford	UFA	Kansas City Chiefs	Kansas City Chiefs
RB	Peyton Hillis	UFA	Kansas City Chiefs	Tampa Bay Buccaneers
G	Russ Hochstein	UFA	Kansas City Chiefs	None
LB	Akeem Jordan	UFA	Philadelphia Eagles	Kansas City Chiefs
LB	Edgar Jones	UFA	Kansas City Chiefs	Kansas City Chiefs
LB	Chad Kilgore	UFA	Oakland Raiders	Kansas City Chiefs
LB	Austen Lane	UFA	Jacksonville Jaguars	Kansas City Chiefs
LB	Orie Lemon	UFA	Dallas Cowboys	Kansas City Chiefs
G	Ryan Lilja	UFA	Kansas City Chiefs	Denver Broncos
TE	Steve Maneri	ERFA	Kansas City Chiefs	Chicago Bears
C	Bryan Mattison	ERFA	Kansas City Chiefs	None
SS	Kyle McCarthy	ERFA	Kansas City Chiefs	Oakland Raiders
TE	Jake O'Connell	UFA	Kansas City Chiefs	Denver Broncos
DE	Ropati Pitoitua	UFA	Kansas City Chiefs	Tennessee Titans
QB	Brady Quinn	UFA	Kansas City Chiefs	Seattle Seahawks
OT	Matt Reynolds	UFA	Philadelphia Eagles	Kansas City Chiefs
CB	Dunta Robinson	UFA	Atlanta Falcons	Kansas City Chiefs
TE	Martin Rucker	RFA	Kansas City Chiefs	None
OT	Geoff Schwartz	UFA	Minnesota Vikings	Kansas City Chiefs
LB	Brandon Siler	UFA	Kansas City Chiefs	None
DE	Shaun Smith	UFA	Kansas City Chiefs	None
CB	Sean Smith	UFA	Miami Dolphins	Kansas City Chiefs
LB	Leon Williams	UFA	Kansas City Chiefs	None
LB	Frank Zombo	UFA	Green Bay Packers	Kansas City Chiefs
*RFA: Restricted free agent, UFA: Unrestricted free agent, ERFA: Exclusive rights free agent, Franchise: Franchise tag

=== Draft ===
2013 Kansas City Chiefs draft
Round	Pick	Player	Position	College	Notes
1	1	Eric Fisher *	OT	Central Michigan	
3	63	Travis Kelce *	TE	Cincinnati	
3	96	Knile Davis	RB	Arkansas	Compensatory
4	99	Nico Johnson	LB	Alabama	
5	134	Sanders Commings	CB	Georgia	
6	170	Eric Kush	C	California (PA)	
6	204	Braden Wilson	FB	Kansas State	Compensatory
7	207	Mike Catapano	DE	Princeton	
Made roster † Pro Football Hall of Fame * Made at least one Pro Bowl during career

=== Undrafted free agents ===
Position	Player	College
QB	Tyler Bray	Tennessee
LB	Darin Drakeford	Maryland
CB	Otha Foster	West Alabama
WR	Frankie Hammond	Florida
TE	Demetrius Harris	Wisconsin-Milwaukee
OL	A.J. Hawkins	Ole Miss
T	Colin Kelly	Oregon State
RB	Kaderius Lacey	Alabama A&M
DL	Rob Lohr	Vanderbilt
DE	Brad Madison	Missouri
LB/FB	Toben Opurum	Kansas
S	Brad McDougald	Kansas
OLB	Josh Martin	Columbia
WR	Rico Richardson	Jackson State
OLB	Ridge Wilson	West Alabama

=== Preseason cuts ===
Cuts to 75
Position	Player
CB	Vince Agnew
DE	Miguel Chavis
WR	Terrance Copper
OL	Ryan Durand
OL	Hutch Eckerson
DB	Otha Foster III
OL	A.J. Hawkins
DE	Rob Lohr
RB	Jordan Roberts
WR	Tyler Shoemaker
QB	Ricky Stanzi
DB	Neiko Thorpe
FB	Braden Wilson
WR	Jamar Newsome

Cuts to 53
Position	Player
T	Steven Baker
WR	Josh Bellamy
S	Malcolm Bronson
S	Greg Castillo
CB	Kennard Cox
DL	Marcus Dixon
OL	Tommie Draheim
LB	Darin Drakeford
RB	Shaun Draughn
WR	Frankie Hammond Jr.
TE	Demetrius Harris
DB	Tysyn Hartman
OG	Ricky Henry
OLB	Austen Lane
LB	Orie Lemon
TE	Tony Moeaki*
CB	Semaj Moody
FB	Toben Opurum
OT	Matt Reynolds
WR	Rico Richardson
OL	Rokevious Watkins
DE/LB	Ridge Wilson

*Tony Moeaki was originally released but was subsequently placed on injured reserve

=== Inseason Transactions ===
==== Cuts ====
Position	Player
CB	Jalil Brown
LB	Zac Diles
DT	Jerrell Powe
WR	Devon Wylie
LB	Josh Martin
DT	Anthony Toribio

==== Signings ====
Position	Player
TE	Kevin Brock
CB	Marcus Cooper
DT	Jaye Howard
LB	James-Michael Johnson
TE	Sean McGrath
LB	Dezman Moses
CB	Ron Parker
G	Rishaw Johnson
WR	Kyle Williams
DT	Kyle Love

==== Players with multiple transactions ====
This is a list of players who played for the Chiefs at some point during the season who were involved in more than one transaction during the season.

Position	Player	Final Status
S	Bradley McDougald	Claimed off waivers by Tampa Bay
WR	Chad Hall	Free Agent

== Staff ==
2013 Kansas City Chiefs staff
Front office: Chairman/CEO – Clark Hunt; President – Mark Donovan; Executive vice president of football operations – Andy Reid; General manager – John Dorsey; Assistant general manager – Joel Collier; Director of football administration – Trip MacCracken; Director of scouting – Chris Ballard; Head coaches: Head coach – Andy Reid; Assistant head coach/wide receivers – David Culley; Senior assistant to the head coach – Joe D’Orazio; Offensive coaches: Offensive coordinator – Doug Pederson; Quarterbacks – Matt Nagy; Running backs – Eric Bieniemy; Tight ends – Tom Melvin; Offensive line – Andy Heck; Assistant offensive line – Eugene Chung; Quality control – Corey Matthaei; Special projects/spread game analysts – Brad Childress; Statistical analysis coordinator – Mike Frazier	Defensive coaches: Defensive coordinator – Bob Sutton; Defensive line – Tommy Brasher; Linebackers – Gary Gibbs; Defensive backs – Emmitt Thomas; Defensive assistant/secondary – Al Harris; Quality control – Mark DeLeone; Quality control – Britt Reid; Pass rush consultant – Joe Kim; Coaching assistant – Dino Vasso; Special teams coaches: Special teams coordinator – Dave Toub; Assistant special teams – Kevin O'Dea; Strength and conditioning: Head athletic trainer – Rick Burkholder; Strength and conditioning – Barry Rubin; Assistant strength and conditioning – Travis Crittenden; Assistant strength and conditioning – Brent Salazar

== Final roster ==
2013 Kansas City Chiefs roster
Quarterbacks (QB): 9 Tyler Bray; 10 Chase Daniel; 11 Alex Smith; Running backs (RB): 25 Jamaal Charles; 34 Knile Davis; 32 Cyrus Gray; 42 Anthony Sherman FB; Wide receivers (WR): 17 Donnie Avery; 82 Dwayne Bowe; 88 Junior Hemingway; 15 A. J. Jenkins; 22 Dexter McCluster; Tight ends (TE): 80 Anthony Fasano; 81 Richard Gordon; 84 Sean McGrath	Offensive linemen (OL): 76 Branden Albert T; 71 Jeff Allen G; 73 Jon Asamoah G; 72 Eric Fisher T; 61 Rodney Hudson C; 75 Rishaw Johnson G; 64 Eric Kush C; 74 Geoff Schwartz G/T; 79 Donald Stephenson T; 69 Rokevious Watkins G; Defensive linemen (DL): 97 Allen Bailey DE; 77 Mike Catapano DE; 70 Mike DeVito DE; 96 Jaye Howard DE; 94 Tyson Jackson DE; 92 Dontari Poe NT; 99 Jerrell Powe NT	Linebackers (LB): 91 Tamba Hali OLB; 50 Justin Houston OLB; 56 Derrick Johnson ILB; 52 James-Michael Johnson ILB; 57 Nico Johnson ILB; 55 Akeem Jordan ILB; 95 Josh Martin OLB; 54 Dezman Moses ILB; 51 Frank Zombo OLB; Defensive backs (DB): 39 Husain Abdullah SS; 29 Eric Berry SS; 31 Marcus Cooper CB; 35 Quintin Demps FS; 24 Brandon Flowers CB; 23 Kendrick Lewis FS; 38 Ron Parker CB; 21 Dunta Robinson CB; 27 Sean Smith CB; Special teams (ST): 2 Dustin Colquitt P; 43 Thomas Gafford LS; 6 Ryan Succop K	Practice squad: 41 Malcolm Bronson S; 66 Chandler Burden G; 85 Frankie Hammond WR; 47 Demetrius Harris TE (IR); 89 Jerrell Jackson WR; 30 Vernon Kearney CB; 44 Eric Kettani FB; 12 Rashad Ross WR; 53 Ridge Wilson LB; Reserve: 26 Sanders Commings CB (IR); 65 Ricky Henry G (IR); 46 Dominique Jones TE (IR); 87 Travis Kelce TE (IR); 59 Colin Kelly T (IR); 19 Kyle Williams WR (IR); Rookies in italics 53 active, 7 reserve, 8 practice squad

== Preseason ==
=== Schedule ===
Week	Date	Opponent	Result	Record	Venue	Recap
1	August 9	at New Orleans Saints	L 13–17	0–1	Mercedes-Benz Superdome	Recap
2	August 16	San Francisco 49ers	L 13–15	0–2	Arrowhead Stadium	Recap
3	August 24	at Pittsburgh Steelers	W 26–20 (OT)	1–2	Heinz Field	Recap
4	August 29	Green Bay Packers	W 30–8	2–2	Arrowhead Stadium	Recap

=== Game summaries ===
==== Week 1: at New Orleans Saints ====
Week 1: Kansas City Chiefs at New Orleans Saints – Game summary

Quarter	1	2	3	4	Total
Chiefs	10	0	0	3	13
Saints	0	3	14	0	17

at Mercedes-Benz Superdome, New Orleans, Louisiana

- Date: August 9
- Game time: 7:00 p.m. CDT
- Game weather: None (indoor stadium)
- Game attendance: 72,080
- Referee: Mike Carey
- Recap, Game Book

Game information

First quarter

- KC – Jamaal Charles 1-yard run (Ryan Succop kick), 8:37. Chiefs 7–0. Drive: 14 plays, 80 yards, 6:23.
- KC – Ryan Succop 42-yard field goal, 4:06. Chiefs 10–0. Drive: 4 plays, 8 yards, 1:33.

Second quarter

- NO – Garrett Hartley 24-yard field goal, 13:35. Chiefs 10–3. Drive: 10 plays, 74 yards, 5:31.

Third quarter

- NO – Preston Parker 2-yard pass from Luke McCown (Garrett Hartley kick), 8:43. Tied 10–10. Drive: 13 plays, 80 yards, 6:17.
- NO – Preston Parker 2-yard pass from Luke McCown (Garrett Hartley kick), 0:32. Saints 17–10. Drive: 10 plays, 82 yards, 4:46.

Fourth quarter

- KC – Ryan Succop 32-yard field goal, 14:44. Saints 17–13. Drive: 4 plays, 13 yards, 0:48.

Top passers

- KC – Alex Smith – 7/8, 68 yards
- NO – Luke McCown – 18/28, 216 yards, 2 TD, INT

Top rushers

- KC – Chase Daniel – 1 rush, 14 yards
- NO – Khiry Robinson – 12 rushes, 52 yards

Top receivers

- KC – Jamaal Charles – 3 receptions, 27 yards
- NO – Nick Toon – 4 receptions, 66 yards

==== Week 2: vs. San Francisco 49ers ====
Week 2: San Francisco 49ers at Kansas City Chiefs – Game summary

Quarter	1	2	3	4	Total
49ers	3	3	3	6	15
Chiefs	10	3	0	0	13

at Arrowhead Stadium, Kansas City, Missouri

- Date: August 16
- Game time: 7:30 p.m. CDT
- Game weather: Clear, 76 °F (24 °C)
- Game attendance: 64,434
- Referee: Walt Anderson
- Recap, Game Book

Game information

First quarter

- SF – Phil Dawson 42-yard field goal, 9:52. 49ers 3–0. Drive: 5 plays, 51 yards, 2:25.
- KC – Quintin Demps 104-yard kickoff return (Ryan Succop kick), 9:38. Chiefs 7–3.
- KC – Ryan Succop 47-yard field goal, 1:54. Chiefs 10–3. Drive: 7 plays, 23 yards, 2:48.

Second quarter

- SF – Phil Dawson 55-yard field goal, 12:28. Chiefs 10–6. Drive: 10 plays, 41 yards, 4:26.
- KC – Ryan Succop 23-yard field goal, 2:31. Chiefs 13–6. Drive: 4 plays, 17 yards, 0:59.

Third quarter

- SF – Phil Dawson 55-yard field goal, 5:42. Chiefs 13–9. Drive: 4 plays, 0 yards, 1:50.

Fourth quarter

- SF – Chuck Jacobs 14-yard pass from B. J. Daniels (kick blocked), 2:02. 49ers 15–13. Drive: 13 plays, 90 yards, 6:24.

Top passers

- SF – B. J. Daniels – 6/9, 72 yards, TD
- KC – Alex Smith – 7/16, 62 yards

Top rushers

- SF – Frank Gore – 2 rushes, 54 yards
- KC – Knile Davis – 10 rushes, 37 yards

Top receivers

- SF – Chad Hall – 2 receptions, 39 yards
- KC – Knile Davis – 3 receptions, 31 yards

==== Week 3: at Pittsburgh Steelers ====
Week 3: Kansas City Chiefs at Pittsburgh Steelers – Game summary

Quarter	1	2	3	4	OT	Total
Chiefs	0	10	7	3	6	26
Steelers	10	0	7	3	0	20

at Heinz Field, Pittsburgh, Pennsylvania

- Date: August 24
- Game time: 7:30 p.m. EDT/6:30 p.m. CDT
- Game weather: Mostly sunny, 76 °F (24 °C)
- Game attendance: 51,852
- Referee: Jeff Triplette
- Recap, Game Book

Game information

First quarter

- PIT – Shaun Suisham 28-yard field goal, 6:27. Steelers 3–0. Drive: 8 plays, 70 yards, 4:24.
- PIT – Jonathan Dwyer 13-yard pass from Ben Roethlisberger (Shaun Suisham kick), 2:51. Steelers 10–0. Drive: 6 plays, 21 yards, 2:21.

Second quarter

- KC – Ryan Succop 19-yard field goal, 2:57. Steelers 10–3. Drive: 5 plays, 51 yards, 2:07.
- KC – Junior Hemingway 5-yard pass from Alex Smith (Ryan Succop kick), 0:18. Tied 10–10. Drive: 8 plays, 72 yards, 1:00.

Third quarter

- PIT – Markus Wheaton 34-yard pass from Bruce Gradkowski (Shaun Suisham kick), 1:59. Steelers 17–10. Drive: 8 plays, 80 yards, 4:30.
- KC – Knile Davis 109-yard kickoff return (Ryan Succop kick), 1:45. Tied 17–17.

Fourth quarter

- PIT – Shaun Suisham 27-yard field goal, 11:10. Steelers 20–17. Drive: 13 plays, 68 yards, 6:35.
- KC – Ryan Succop 38-yard field goal, 1:32. Tied 20–20. Drive: 11 plays, 61 yards, 3:19.

Overtime

- KC – Rico Richardson 15-yard pass from Chase Daniel, 8:53. Chiefs 26–20. Drive: 13 plays, 71 yards, 6:07.

Top passers

- KC – Alex Smith – 17/24, 158 yards, TD
- PIT – Ben Roethlisberger – 13/19, 166 yards, TD

Top rushers

- KC – Chase Daniel – 5 rushes, 45 yards
- PIT – Felix Jones – 8 rushes, 29 yards

Top receivers

- KC – Dwayne Bowe – 6 receptions, 73 yards
- PIT – Antonio Brown – 3 receptions, 61 yards

==== Week 4: vs. Green Bay Packers ====
Week 4: Green Bay Packers at Kansas City Chiefs – Game summary

Quarter	1	2	3	4	Total
Packers	3	3	2	0	8
Chiefs	3	10	7	10	30

at Arrowhead Stadium, Kansas City, Missouri

- Date: August 29
- Game time: 7:00 p.m. CDT
- Game weather: Clear, 90 °F (32 °C)
- Game attendance: 65,063
- Referee: Walt Coleman
- Recap, Game Book

Game information

First quarter

- GB – Mason Crosby 48-yard field goal, 12:53. Packers 3–0. Drive: 4 plays, 5 yards, 1:55.
- KC – Ryan Succop 37-yard field goal, 3:49. Tied 3–3. Drive: 4 plays, –5 yards, 1:55.

Second quarter

- KC – Ryan Succop 48-yard field goal, 8:50. Chiefs 6–3. Drive: 6 plays, 25 yards, 2:47.
- GB – Mason Crosby 45-yard field goal, 6:13. Tied 6–6. Drive: 8 plays, 53 yards, 2:37.
- KC – Junior Hemingway 8-yard pass from Tyler Bray (Ryan Succop kick), 0:05. Chiefs 13–6. Drive: 7 plays, 50 yards, 1:35.

Third quarter

- KC – Josh Bellamy 43-yard pass from Tyler Bray (Ryan Succop kick), 6:03. Chiefs 20–6. Drive: 4 plays, 55 yards, 1:37.
- GB – Tyler Bray sacked in end zone by Sam Barrington for a Safety, 1:44. Chiefs 20–8.

Fourth quarter

- KC – Ryan Succop 48-yard field goal, 12:19. Chiefs 23–8. Drive: 6 plays, 23 yards, 3:17.
- KC – Frankie Hammond 9-yard pass from Tyler Bray (Ryan Succop kick), 5:14. Chiefs 30–8. Drive: 10 plays, 41 yards, 5:29.

Top passers

- GB – Vince Young – 14/30, 144 yards
- KC – Tyler Bray – 14/25, 169 yards, 3 TD, INT

Top rushers

- GB – Johnathan Franklin – 8 rushes, 23 yards
- KC – Cyrus Gray – 13 rushes, 72 yards

Top receivers

- GB – Jeremy Ross – 3 receptions, 50 yards
- KC – Junior Hemingway – 7 receptions, 80 yards, TD

== Regular season ==
=== Schedule ===
Week	Date	Opponent	Result	Record	Venue	Recap
1	September 8	at Jacksonville Jaguars	**W** 28–2	1–0	EverBank Field	Recap
2	September 15	Dallas Cowboys	**W** 17–16	2–0	Arrowhead Stadium	Recap
3	September 19	at Philadelphia Eagles	**W** 26–16	3–0	Lincoln Financial Field	Recap
4	September 29	New York Giants	**W** 31–7	4–0	Arrowhead Stadium	Recap
5	October 6	at Tennessee Titans	**W** 26–17	5–0	LP Field	Recap
6	October 13	**Oakland Raiders**	**W** 24–7	6–0	Arrowhead Stadium	Recap
7	October 20	Houston Texans	**W** 17–16	7–0	Arrowhead Stadium	Recap
8	October 27	Cleveland Browns	**W** 23–17	8–0	Arrowhead Stadium	Recap
9	November 3	at Buffalo Bills	**W** 23–13	9–0	Ralph Wilson Stadium	Recap
10	Bye					
11	November 17	at **Denver Broncos**	**L** 17–27	9–1	Sports Authority Field at Mile High	Recap
12	November 24	**San Diego Chargers**	**L** 38–41	9–2	Arrowhead Stadium	Recap
13	December 1	**Denver Broncos**	**L** 28–35	9–3	Arrowhead Stadium	Recap
14	December 8	at Washington Redskins	**W** 45–10	10–3	FedExField	Recap
15	December 15	at **Oakland Raiders**	**W** 56–31	11–3	O.co Coliseum	Recap
16	December 22	Indianapolis Colts	**L** 7–23	11–4	Arrowhead Stadium	Recap
17	December 29	at **San Diego Chargers**	**L** 24–27 (OT)	11–5	Qualcomm Stadium	Recap

Note: Intra-division opponents are in bold text.

=== Game summaries ===
==== Week 1: at Jacksonville Jaguars ====
Week 1: Kansas City Chiefs at Jacksonville Jaguars – Game summary

Quarter	1	2	3	4	Total
**Chiefs**	14	7	0	7	**28**
Jaguars	2	0	0	0	**2**

at EverBank Field, Jacksonville, Florida

- Date: September 8
- Game time: 1:00 p.m. EDT/12:00 p.m. CDT
- Game weather: Sunny, 85 °F (29 °C)
- Game attendance: 59,416
- Referee: Pete Morelli
- TV announcers (CBS): Spero Dedes and Steve Tasker
- Recap, Game Book

Game information

**First quarter**

- JAX – Punt blocked by J.T. Thomas out of bounds in end zone for a Safety, 12:26. Jaguars 2–0.
- KC – Donnie Avery 5-yard pass from Alex Smith (Ryan Succop kick), 9:04. Chiefs 7–2. **Drive: 3 plays, 24 yards, 1:20.**
- KC – Junior Hemingway 3-yard pass from Alex Smith (Ryan Succop kick), 1:35. Chiefs 14–2. **Drive: 2 plays, 21 yards, 0:33.**

**Second quarter**

- KC – Jamaal Charles 3-yard run (Ryan Succop kick), 6:26. Chiefs 21–2. **Drive: 8 plays, 57 yards, 4:42.**

**Third quarter**

- No scoring plays.

**Fourth quarter**

- KC – Tamba Hali 10-yard interception return (Ryan Succop kick), 12:51. Chiefs 28–2.

**Top passers**

- KC – Alex Smith – 21/34, 173 yards, 2 TD
- JAX – Blaine Gabbert – 16/36, 121 yards, 2 INT

**Top rushers**

- KC – Jamaal Charles – 16 rushes, 77 yards, TD
- JAX – Maurice Jones-Drew – 15 rushes, 45 yards

**Top receivers**

- KC – Anthony Sherman – 4 receptions, 44 yards
- JAX – Justin Forsett – 4 receptions, 22 yards

The Chiefs started their 2013 season on the road against the Jaguars. The Jags scored a safety when J. T. Thomas blocked a punt in the end zone, giving them a 2–0 lead. The Chiefs took the lead when Alex Smith found Donnie Avery on a 5-yard touchdown pass, making the score 7–2. This was followed up by Smith finding Junior Hemingway on a 3-yard pass, extending the Chiefs' lead to 14–2. In the second quarter, the Chiefs continued to dominate as Jamaal Charles ran for a 2-yard touchdown, giving the team a 21–2 halftime lead.

After a scoreless third quarter, the Chiefs scored the only points of the second half in the fourth quarter when Tamba Hali returned an interception 10 yards for a touchdown.

The Chiefs beat the Jacksonville Jaguars 28–2, the first time in NFL history a game ended with that score. It was also the second time in 20 years a team scored only two points during a regular season game, as well as being the most recent one as of 2021. The Jaguars crossed the 50-yard line once during the game but failed to score.

With the win, the Chiefs started 1–0.

==== Week 2: vs. Dallas Cowboys ====
Week 2: Dallas Cowboys at Kansas City Chiefs – Game summary

Quarter	1	2	3	4	Total
Cowboys	10	0	3	3	**16**
**Chiefs**	7	0	7	3	**17**

at Arrowhead Stadium, Kansas City, Missouri

- Date: September 15
- Game time: 12:00 p.m. CDT
- Game weather: Sunny, 72 °F (22 °C)
- Game attendance: 76,952
- Referee: Jerome Boger
- TV announcers (Fox): Chris Myers, Tim Ryan and Jennifer Hale
- Recap, Game Book

Game information

**First quarter**

- KC – Jamaal Charles 2-yard pass from Alex Smith (Ryan Succop kick), 8:13. Chiefs 7–0. **Drive: 13 plays, 77 yards, 6:47.**
- DAL – Dan Bailey 51-yard field goal, 5:02. Chiefs 7–3. **Drive: 6 plays, 47 yards, 3:11.**
- DAL – Dez Bryant 2-yard pass from Tony Romo (Dan Bailey kick), 0:36. Cowboys 10–7. **Drive: 6 plays, 55 yards, 3:20.**

**Second quarter**

- No scoring plays.

**Third quarter**

- DAL – Dan Bailey 30-yard field goal, 6:54. Cowboys 13–7. **Drive: 13 plays, 68 yards, 8:06.**
- KC – Dwayne Bowe 12-yard pass from Alex Smith (Ryan Succop kick), 2:53. Chiefs 14–13. **Drive: 10 plays, 80 yards, 4:01.**

**Fourth quarter**

- KC – Ryan Succop 40-yard field goal, 14:06. Chiefs 17–13. **Drive: 4 plays, 9 yards, 1:32.**
- DAL – Dan Bailey 53-yard field goal, 3:50. Chiefs 17–16. **Drive: 9 plays, 45 yards, 2:53.**

**Top passers**

- DAL – Tony Romo – 30/42, 298 yards, TD
- KC – Alex Smith – 21/36, 223 yards, 2 TD

**Top rushers**

- DAL – DeMarco Murray – 12 rushes, 25 yards
- KC – Alex Smith – 8 rushes, 57 yards

**Top receivers**

- DAL – Dez Bryant – 9 receptions, 141 yards, TD
- KC – Dwayne Bowe – 4 receptions, 56 yards, TD

The Chiefs made their regular season debut at home against the Cowboys. They scored first as Jamaal Charles caught a 2-yard touchdown pass from Alex Smith for a 7–0 lead. The Cowboys got on the scoreboard when Dan Bailey kicked a 51-yard field goal to make the score 7–3, followed by Tony Romo and Dez Bryant hooking up on a 2-yard pass to give the Cowboys a 10–7 lead. With the 2nd quarter being scoreless, the Cowboys held on to their lead through halftime.

In the 3rd quarter, Bailey nailed a 30-yard field goal to increase the Cowboys' lead to 13–7. However, the Chiefs retook the lead when Smith found Dwayne Bowe on a 12-yard pass, making the score 14–13. In the 4th quarter, the Chiefs increased their lead to 17–13 when Ryan Succop nailed a 40-yard field goal. The Cowboys tried to rally late, but came up a point short when the only score they could muster was a 53-yard field goal by Bailey. The Chiefs won the game 17–16, earning their first 2–0 start since 2010.

==== Week 3: at Philadelphia Eagles ====
Week 3: Kansas City Chiefs at Philadelphia Eagles – Game summary

Quarter	1	2	3	4	Total
**Chiefs**	10	6	0	10	**26**
Eagles	6	0	3	7	**16**

at Lincoln Financial Field, Philadelphia, Pennsylvania

- Date: September 19
- Game time: 8:25 p.m. EDT/7:25 p.m. CDT
- Game weather: Clear, 73 °F (23 °C)
- Game attendance: 69,144
- Referee: Walt Anderson
- TV announcers (NFLN): Brad Nessler, Mike Mayock and Alex Flanagan
- Recap, Game Book

Game information

**First quarter**

- KC – Ryan Succop 33-yard field goal, 12:08. Chiefs 3–0. **Drive: 4 plays, −7 yards, 1:50.**
- KC – Eric Berry 38-yard interception return (Ryan Succop kick), 11:12. Chiefs 10–0.
- PHI – Jason Avant 22-yard pass from Michael Vick (run failed), 5:06. Chiefs 10–6. **Drive: 3 plays, 87 yards, 1:16.**

**Second quarter**

- KC – Ryan Succop 31-yard field goal, 8:21. Chiefs 13–6. **Drive: 8 plays, 69 yards, 3:07.**
- KC – Ryan Succop 34-yard field goal, 2:26. Chiefs 16–6. **Drive: 8 plays, 45 yards, 3:51.**

**Third quarter**

- PHI – Alex Henery 29-yard field goal, 6:29. Chiefs 16–9. **Drive: 10 plays, 70 yards, 3:05.**

**Fourth quarter**

- KC – Jamaal Charles 3-yard run (Ryan Succop kick), 12:57. Chiefs 23–9. **Drive: 8 plays, 62 yards, 4:45.**
- PHI – LeSean McCoy 41-yard run (Alex Henery kick), 11:36. Chiefs 23–16. **Drive: 5 plays, 78 yards, 1:21.**
- KC – Ryan Succop 38-yard field goal, 3:21. Chiefs 26–16. **Drive: 15 plays, 75 yards, 8:15.**

**Top passers**

- KC – Alex Smith – 22/35, 273 yards
- PHI – Michael Vick – 13/30, 201 yards, TD, 2 INT

**Top rushers**

- KC – Jamaal Charles – 20 rushes, 92 yards, TD
- PHI – LeSean McCoy – 20 rushes, 158 yards, TD

**Top receivers**

- KC – Donnie Avery – 7 receptions, 141 yards
- PHI – Jason Avant – 5 receptions, 87 yards, TD

After a close call win at home, the Chiefs traveled to Philadelphia to take on the Eagles in a TNF duel. The Chiefs started their scoring when Ryan Succop kicked a 33-yard field goal for a 3–0 lead. This was followed by Eric Berry returning an interception 38 yards for a touchdown for a 10–0 lead. The Eagles managed to get on the board later on in the quarter when Michael Vick found Jason Avant on a 22-yard touchdown pass (with a failed PAT) making the score 10–6. The Chiefs continued to dominate as Succop kicked 2 field goals increasing his teams lead from 7 to eventually 10 points with field goals from 31 and 34 yards out 13–6 and 16–6 at halftime. In the 3rd quarter, the Eagles managed to rally coming within 7 points as Alex Henery kicked a 29-yard field goal for the only score of the quarter. The Chiefs pulled away as Jamaal Charles ran for a 3-yard touchdown for a 23–9 lead. The Eagles then fired back as LeSean McCoy ran for a touchdown from 41-yards out once again coming within 7 23–16. With Succop's 38-yard field goal, the Chiefs were able to seal the game with a final score of 26–16 sending them to a 3–0 start, their first such start since 2010. This was also head coach Andy Reid’s first visit to Philadelphia since he was fired by the organization a season earlier. Reid served as the Eagles head coach from 1999 to 2012.

==== Week 4: vs. New York Giants ====
Week 4: New York Giants at Kansas City Chiefs – Game summary

Quarter	1	2	3	4	Total
Giants	0	7	0	0	**7**
**Chiefs**	0	10	7	14	**31**

at Arrowhead Stadium, Kansas City, Missouri

- Date: September 29
- Game time: 12:00 p.m. CDT
- Game weather: Sunny with calm winds, 66 °F (19 °C)
- Game attendance: 73,386
- Referee: Terry McAulay
- TV announcers (Fox): Kevin Burkhardt, John Lynch and Erin Andrews
- Recap, Game Book

Game information

**First quarter**

- No scoring plays.

**Second quarter**

- KC – Sean McGarth 5-yard pass from Alex Smith (Ryan Succop kick), 14:47. Chiefs 7–0. **Drive: 11 plays, 98 yards, 5:38.**
- NYG – Victor Cruz 69-yard pass from Eli Manning (Josh Brown kick), 13:53. Tied 7–7. **Drive: 2 plays, 74 yards, 0:54.**
- KC – Ryan Succop 51-yard field goal, 1:55. Chiefs 10–7. **Drive: 5 plays, 31 yards, 1:53.**

**Third quarter**

- KC – Dexter McCluster 89-yard punt return (Ryan Succop kick), 1:34. Chiefs 17–7.

**Fourth quarter**

- KC – Jamaal Charles 2-yard pass from Alex Smith (Ryan Succop kick), 5:43. Chiefs 24–7. **Drive: 14 plays, 80 yards, 9:17.**
- KC – Dwayne Bowe 34-yard pass from Alex Smith (Ryan Succop kick), 3:06. Chiefs 31–7. **Drive: 3 plays, 35 yards, 1:25.**

**Top passers**

- NYG – Eli Manning – 18/37, 217 yards, TD, INT
- KC – Alex Smith – 24/41, 288 yards, 3 TD, 2 INT

**Top rushers**

- NYG – David Wilson – 13 rushes, 55 yards
- KC – Jamaal Charles – 18 rushes, 65 yards

**Top receivers**

- NYG – Victor Cruz – 10 receptions, 164 yards, TD
- KC – Sean McGrath – 5 receptions, 64 yards, TD

After a win over the Eagles, the Chiefs returned home for a game against the Giants. After a scoreless first quarter, they got on the board as Alex Smith found Sean McGrath on a 5-yard pass for a 7–0 lead. The Giants managed to tie the game up as Eli Manning found Victor Cruz on a 69-yard pass making the score 7–7. Ryan Succop then kicked a 51-yard field goal to send the Chiefs to a 10–7 halftime lead.

In the second half, the Chiefs dominated as Dexter McCluster ran a punt back 89 yards for a touchdown increasing their lead to 17–7 for the only score of the third quarter. In the fourth quarter, Alex Smith threw two more touchdown passes to Jamaal Charles and Dwayne Bowe from 2 and 34 yards out that eventually sealed the game for them, moving them up 24–7 before the final score sat at 31–7.

The win sent the Chiefs to their first 4–0 start since 2003.

==== Week 5: at Tennessee Titans ====
Week 5: Kansas City Chiefs at Tennessee Titans – Game summary

Quarter	1	2	3	4	Total
**Chiefs**	7	6	0	13	**26**
Titans	0	0	10	7	**17**

at LP Field, Nashville, Tennessee

- Date: October 6
- Game time: 12:00 p.m. CDT
- Game weather: Cloudy, 74 °F (23 °C)
- Game attendance: 69,143
- Referee: Bill Vinovich
- TV announcers (CBS): Kevin Harlan and Solomon Wilcots
- Recap, Game Book

Game information

**First quarter**

- KC – Marcus Cooper fumble recovery in end zone (Ryan Succop kick), 11:40. Chiefs 7–0.

**Second quarter**

- KC – Ryan Succop 29-yard field goal, 14:55. Chiefs 10–0. **Drive: 5 plays, 53 yards, 1:56.**
- KC – Ryan Succop 24-yard field goal, 0:09. Chiefs 13–0. **Drive: 10 plays, 94 yards, 4:00.**

**Third quarter**

- TEN – Chris Johnson 49-yard pass from Ryan Fitzpatrick (Rob Bironas kick), 12:09. Chiefs 13–7. **Drive: 5 plays, 82 yards, 2:51.**
- TEN – Rob Bironas 22-yard field goal, 6:37. Chiefs 13–10. **Drive: 9 plays, 56 yards, 4:25.**

**Fourth quarter**

- TEN – Ryan Fitzpatrick 9-yard run (Rob Bironas kick), 14:52. Titans 17–13. **Drive: 9 plays, 42 yards, 4:54.**
- KC – Jamaal Charles 1-yard run (Ryan Succop kick), 6:23. Chiefs 20–17. **Drive: 10 plays, 66 yards, 5:05.**
- KC – Ryan Succop 33-yard field goal, 4:10. Chiefs 23–17. **Drive: 5 plays, 18 yards, 2:04.**
- KC – Ryan Succop 48-yard field goal, 2:12. Chiefs 26–17. **Drive: 4 plays, 3 yards, 0:27.**

**Top passers**

- KC – Alex Smith – 20/39, 245 yards, INT
- TEN – Ryan Fitzpatrick – 21/41, 247 yards, TD, 2 INT

**Top rushers**

- KC – Jamaal Charles – 20 rushes, 108 yards, TD
- TEN – Ryan Fitzpatrick – 6 rushes, 50 yards, TD

**Top receivers**

- KC – Donnie Avery – 3 receptions, 91 yards
- TEN – Kendall Wright – 6 receptions, 74 yards

Kansas City jumped to 13–0 lead but by end of the third quarter, the Chiefs were trailing 17–13. But the Chiefs answered by scoring 13 unanswered points in the 4th quarter and won the game 26–17.

With the win, the team improved to 5–0, their first such start since 2003.

==== Week 6: vs. Oakland Raiders ====
Week 6: Oakland Raiders at Kansas City Chiefs – Game summary

Quarter	1	2	3	4	Total
Raiders	0	7	0	0	**7**
**Chiefs**	0	7	7	10	**24**

at Arrowhead Stadium, Kansas City, Missouri

- Date: October 13
- Game time: 12:00 p.m. CDT
- Game weather: Sunny, 63 °F (17 °C)
- Game attendance: 76,394
- Referee: Mike Carey
- TV announcers (CBS): Spero Dedes and Rich Gannon
- Recap, Game Book

Game information

**First quarter**

- No scoring plays.

**Second quarter**

- OAK – Denarius Moore 39-yard pass from Terrelle Pryor (Sebastian Janikowski kick), 8:40. Raiders 7–0. **Drive: 6 plays, 78 yards, 3:16.**
- KC – Jamaal Charles 7-yard run (Ryan Succop kick), 1:06. Tied 7–7. **Drive: 5 plays, 55 yards, 1:03.**

**Third quarter**

- KC – Jamaal Charles 2-yard run (Ryan Succop kick), 2:01. Chiefs 14–7. **Drive: 4 plays, 23 yards, 1:56.**

**Fourth quarter**

- KC – Ryan Succop 33-yard field goal, 2:09. Chiefs 17–7. **Drive: 6 plays, 14 yards, 2:00.**
- KC – Husain Abdullah 44-yard interception return (Ryan Succop kick), 1:35. Chiefs 24–7.

**Top passers**

- OAK – Terrelle Pryor – 18/34, 216 yards, TD, 3 INT
- KC – Alex Smith – 14/31, 128 yards

**Top rushers**

- OAK – Terrelle Pryor – 7 rushes, 56 yards
- KC – Jamaal Charles – 22 rushes, 78 yards, 2 TD

**Top receivers**

- OAK – Denarius Moore – 5 receptions, 82 yards, TD
- KC – Jamaal Charles – 5 receptions, 50 yards

The Chiefs improved to 6–0 after defeating the Oakland Raiders 24–7, and snapped a six-game home losing streak to the Oakland Raiders dating back to the 2007 season. It was at this game that Arrowhead Stadium fans set a new Guinness World Record for loudest outdoor stadium in any sport.

It also featured the largest flyover with 42 planes.

==== Week 7: vs. Houston Texans ====
Week 7: Houston Texans at Kansas City Chiefs – Game summary

Quarter	1	2	3	4	Total
Texans	3	7	6	0	**16**
**Chiefs**	7	7	3	0	**17**

at Arrowhead Stadium, Kansas City, Missouri

- Date: October 20
- Game time: 3:25 p.m. CDT
- Game weather: Sunny, 70 °F (21 °C)
- Game attendance: 74,118
- Referee: Ed Hochuli
- TV announcers (CBS): Jim Nantz and Phil Simms
- Recap, Game Book

Game information

**First quarter**

- HOU – Randy Bullock 48-yard field goal, 8:12. Texans 3–0. **Drive: 10 plays, 27 yards, 4:55.**
- KC – Jamaal Charles 1-yard run (Ryan Succop kick), 2:43. Chiefs 7–3. **Drive: 11 plays, 82 yards, 5:29.**

**Second quarter**

- HOU – DeAndre Hopkins 29-yard pass from Case Keenum (Randy Bullock kick), 14:54. Texans 10–7. **Drive: 5 plays, 81 yards, 2:49.**
- KC – Alex Smith 5-yard run (Ryan Succop kick), 0:56. Chiefs 14–10. **Drive: 15 plays, 97 yards, 6:35.**

**Third quarter**

- HOU – Randy Bullock 21-yard field goal, 9:24. Chiefs 14–13. **Drive: 5 plays, 25 yards, 2:07.**
- KC – Ryan Succop 22-yard field goal, 6:07. Chiefs 17–13. **Drive: 7 plays, 42 yards, 3:17.**
- HOU – Randy Bullock 47-yard field goal, 4:12. Chiefs 17–16. **Drive: 5 plays, 51 yards, 1:46.**

**Fourth quarter**

- No scoring plays.

**Top passers**

- HOU – Case Keenum – 15/25, 271 yards, TD
- KC – Alex Smith – 23/34, 240 yards, INT

**Top rushers**

- HOU – Ben Tate – 15 rushes, 50 yards
- KC – Jamaal Charles – 21 rushes, 86 yards, TD

**Top receivers**

- HOU – Andre Johnson – 4 receptions, 89 yards
- KC – Dexter McCluster – 4 receptions, 70 yards

With the win, the Chiefs improved to 7–0, the first time they had begun a season with such a record since 2003. With the Broncos' loss to the Colts, they became the league's only undefeated team while they also became leader of the AFC West.

==== Week 8: vs. Cleveland Browns ====
Week 8: Cleveland Browns at Kansas City Chiefs – Game summary

Quarter	1	2	3	4	Total
Browns	0	10	7	0	**17**
**Chiefs**	6	14	0	3	**23**

at Arrowhead Stadium, Kansas City, Missouri

- Date: October 27
- Game time: 12:00 p.m. CDT
- Game weather: Sunny, clear, 52 °F (11 °C)
- Game attendance: 74,307
- Referee: Clete Blakeman
- TV announcers (CBS): Ian Eagle and Dan Fouts
- Recap, Game Book

Game information

**First quarter**

- KC – Ryan Succop 42-yard field goal, 11:22. Chiefs 3–0. **Drive: 9 plays, 64 yards, 3:38.**
- KC – Ryan Succop 35-yard field goal, 4:46. Chiefs 6–0. **Drive: 11 plays, 47 yards, 5:04.**

**Second quarter**

- KC – Anthony Sherman 12-yard pass from Alex Smith (Ryan Succop kick), 10:26. Chiefs 13–0. **Drive: 14 plays, 82 yards, 7:34.**
- CLE – Josh Gordon 39-yard pass from Jason Campbell (Billy Cundiff kick), 2:44. Chiefs 13–7. **Drive: 2 plays, 58 yards, 0:32.**
- KC – Dexter McCluster 28-yard pass from Alex Smith (Ryan Succop kick), 1:11. Chiefs 20–7. **Drive: 6 plays, 75 yards, 1:33.**
- CLE – Billy Cundiff 44-yard field goal, 0:10. Chiefs 20–10. **Drive: 7 plays, 54 yards, 1:01.**

**Third quarter**

- CLE – Fozzy Whittaker 17-yard pass from Jason Campbell (Billy Cundiff kick), 9:58. Chiefs 20–17. **Drive: 9 plays, 80 yards, 5:02.**

**Fourth quarter**

- KC – Ryan Succop 40-yard field goal, 0:17. Chiefs 23–17. **Drive: 4 plays, 9 yards, 1:44.**

**Top passers**

- CLE – Jason Campbell – 22/36, 293 yards, 2 TD
- KC – Alex Smith – 24/36, 225 yards, 2 TD

**Top rushers**

- CLE – Willis McGahee – 9 rushes, 28 yards
- KC – Jamaal Charles – 18 rushes, 74 yards

**Top receivers**

- CLE – Josh Gordon – 5 receptions, 132 yards, TD
- KC – Dexter McCluster – 7 receptions, 67 yards, TD

With the win, the Chiefs improved to 8–0 for the first time since 2003.

==== Week 9: at Buffalo Bills ====
Week 9: Kansas City Chiefs at Buffalo Bills – Game summary

Quarter	1	2	3	4	Total
**Chiefs**	0	3	10	10	**23**
Bills	7	3	3	0	**13**

at Ralph Wilson Stadium, Orchard Park, New York

- Date: November 3
- Game time: 1:00 p.m. EST/12:00 p.m. CST
- Game weather: Overcast, 36 °F (2 °C)
- Game attendance: 68,159
- Referee: Ron Winter
- TV announcers (CBS): Greg Gumbel and Dan Dierdorf
- Recap, Game Book

Game information

**First quarter**

- BUF – Marquise Goodwin 59-yard pass from Jeff Tuel (Dan Carpenter kick), 1:52. Bills 7–0. **Drive: 6 plays, 88 yards, 2:10.**

**Second quarter**

- KC – Ryan Succop 27-yard field goal, 7:30. Bills 7–3. **Drive: 10 plays, 32 yards, 4:19.**
- BUF – Dan Carpenter 26-yard field goal, 1:47. Bills 10–3. **Drive: 14 plays, 71 yards, 5:43.**

**Third quarter**

- KC – Sean Smith 100-yard interception return (Ryan Succop kick), 10:58. Tied 10–10.
- KC – Ryan Succop 41-yard field goal, 3:57. Chiefs 13–10. **Drive: 7 plays, 42 yards, 2:46.**
- BUF – Dan Carpenter 30-yard field goal, 0:20. Tied 13–13. **Drive: 12 plays, 68 yards, 3:37.**

**Fourth quarter**

- KC – Tamba Hali 11-yard fumble return (Ryan Succop kick), 12:47. Chiefs 20–13.
- KC – Ryan Succop 39-yard field goal, 2:13. Chiefs 23–13. **Drive: 7 plays, 32 yards, 4:16.**

**Top passers**

- KC – Alex Smith – 19/29, 124 yards
- BUF – Jeff Tuel – 18/39, 229 yards, TD, 2 INT

**Top rushers**

- KC – Jamaal Charles – 17 rushes, 90 yards
- BUF – C. J. Spiller – 12 rushes, 116 yards

**Top receivers**

- KC – Dwayne Bowe – 7 receptions, 67 yards
- BUF – Marquise Goodwin – 2 receptions, 64 yards, TD

With the win, the Chiefs went 9–0 heading into their bye week. It also gave them their first winning season since 2010 and first 9–0 start since 2003.

==== Week 11: at Denver Broncos ====
Week 11: Kansas City Chiefs at Denver Broncos – Game summary

Quarter	1	2	3	4	Total
Chiefs	0	10	0	7	**17**
**Broncos**	10	7	7	3	**27**

at Sports Authority Field at Mile High, Denver, Colorado

- Date: November 17
- Game time: 7:30 p.m. CST/6:30 p.m. MST
- Game weather: Clear, 43 °F (6 °C)
- Game attendance: 77,076
- Referee: John Parry
- TV announcers (NBC): Al Michaels, Cris Collinsworth and Michele Tafoya
- Recap, Game Book

Game information

**First quarter**

- DEN – Matt Prater 54-yard field goal, 12:33. Broncos 3–0. **Drive: 7 plays, 17 yards, 1:31.**
- DEN – Julius Thomas 9-yard pass from Peyton Manning (Matt Prater kick), 3:03. Broncos 10–0. **Drive: 5 plays, 84 yards, 2:25.**

**Second quarter**

- KC – Dwayne Bowe 6-yard pass from Alex Smith (Ryan Succop kick), 13:23. Broncos 10–7. **Drive: 11 plays, 80 yards, 4:40.**
- DEN – Montee Ball 1-yard run (Matt Prater kick), 9:05. Broncos 17–7. **Drive: 10 plays, 79 yards, 4:18.**
- KC – Ryan Succop 20-yard field goal, 2:55. Broncos 17–10. **Drive: 12 plays, 79 yards, 6:10.**

**Third quarter**

- DEN – Montee Ball 8-yard run (Matt Prater kick), 2:22. Broncos 24–10. **Drive: 6 plays, 65 yards, 3:02.**

**Fourth quarter**

- DEN – Matt Prater 36-yard field goal, 7:06. Broncos 27–10. **Drive: 10 plays, 62 yards, 4:42.**
- KC – Anthony Fasano 10-yard pass from Alex Smith (Ryan Succop kick), 4:56. Broncos 27–17. **Drive: 9 plays, 80 yards, 2:10.**

**Top passers**

- KC – Alex Smith – 21/45, 230 yards, 2 TD
- DEN – Peyton Manning – 24/40, 323 yards, TD

**Top rushers**

- KC – Jamaal Charles – 16 rushes, 78 yards
- DEN – Knowshon Moreno – 27 rushes, 79 yards

**Top receivers**

- KC – Dwayne Bowe – 4 receptions, 57 yards, TD
- DEN – Demaryius Thomas – 5 receptions, 121 yards

Against the Broncos in a battle of the 9–0 Chiefs and 8–1 Broncos, Denver wound up beating the Chiefs 27–17, handing the Chiefs their first loss. With the loss, the Chiefs fell to 9–1.

==== Week 12: vs. San Diego Chargers ====
Week 12: San Diego Chargers at Kansas City Chiefs – Game summary

Quarter	1	2	3	4	Total
**Chargers**	3	7	14	17	**41**
Chiefs	7	7	14	10	**38**

at Arrowhead Stadium, Kansas City, Missouri

- Date: November 24
- Game time: 12:00 p.m. CST
- Game weather: Mostly sunny, 24 °F (−4 °C)
- Game attendance: 75,259
- Referee: Walt Coleman
- TV announcers (CBS): Jim Nantz and Phil Simms
- Recap, Game Book

Game information

**First quarter**

- SD – Nick Novak 30-yard field goal, 6:11. Chargers 3–0. **Drive: 7 plays, 43 yards, 3:18.**
- KC – Donnie Avery 32-yard pass from Alex Smith (Ryan Succop kick), 1:37. Chiefs 7–3. **Drive: 8 plays, 74 yards, 4:34.**

**Second quarter**

- KC – Jamaal Charles 7-yard run (Ryan Succop kick), 3:03. Chiefs 14–3. **Drive: 3 plays, 46 yards, 1:26.**
- SD – Danny Woodhead 11-yard pass from Philip Rivers (Nick Novak kick), 0:16. Chiefs 14–10. **Drive: 11 plays, 80 yards, 2:47.**

**Third quarter**

- SD – Ryan Mathews 1-yard run (Nick Novak kick), 12:17. Chargers 17–14. **Drive: 6 plays, 72 yards, 2:43.**
- KC – Jamaal Charles 1-yard run (Ryan Succop kick), 9:00. Chiefs 21–17. **Drive: 7 plays, 85 yards, 3:17.**
- SD – Danny Woodhead 3-yard run (Nick Novak kick), 5:27. Chargers 24–21. **Drive: 2 plays, 16 yards, 0:42.**
- KC – Anthony Fasano 4-yard pass from Alex Smith (Ryan Succop kick), 2:12. Chiefs 28–24. **Drive: 7 plays, 64 yards, 3:15.**

**Fourth quarter**

- SD – Nick Novak 30-yard field goal, 12:31. Chiefs 28–27. **Drive: 10 plays, 59 yards, 4:41.**
- KC – Ryan Succop 25-yard field goal, 9:32. Chiefs 31–27. **Drive: 6 plays, 57 yards, 2:59.**
- SD – Ladarius Green 60-yard pass from Philip Rivers (Nick Novak kick), 7:50. Chargers 34–31. **Drive: 3 plays, 68 yards, 1:42.**
- KC – Dwayne Bowe 5-yard pass from Alex Smith (Ryan Succop kick), 1:22. Chiefs 38–34. **Drive: 6 plays, 55 yards, 2:29.**
- SD – Seyi Ajirotutu 26-yard pass from Philip Rivers (Nick Novak kick), 0:24. Chargers 41–38. **Drive: 7 plays, 78 yards, 0:58.**

**Top passers**

- SD – Philip Rivers – 27/39, 392 yards, 3 TD
- KC – Alex Smith – 26/38, 294 yards, 3 TD, INT

**Top rushers**

- SD – Ryan Mathews – 14 rushes, 55 yards, TD
- KC – Jamaal Charles – 14 rushes, 115 yards, 2 TD

**Top receivers**

- SD – Keenan Allen – 9 receptions, 124 yards
- KC – Donnie Avery – 4 receptions, 91 yards, TD

San Diego triumphed in the highest-scoring matchup with Kansas City since a 42–41 loss in 1986. The game lead changed eight times as Alex Smith threw for 294 yards and three touchdowns, but Rivers (392 yards) won it in the final seconds on a 26-yard score to Seyi Ajirotutu. The loss was Kansas City's second straight after the Chiefs' nine-game winning streak.

==== Week 13: vs. Denver Broncos ====
Week 13: Denver Broncos at Kansas City Chiefs – Game summary

Quarter	1	2	3	4	Total
**Broncos**	0	14	14	7	**35**
Chiefs	7	14	0	7	**28**

at Arrowhead Stadium, Kansas City, Missouri

- Date: December 1
- Game time: 3:25 p.m. CST
- Game weather: Sunny and clear, 55 °F (13 °C)
- Game attendance: 77,065
- Referee: Terry McAulay
- TV announcers (CBS): Jim Nantz and Phil Simms
- Recap, Game Book

Game information

**First quarter**

- KC – Junior Hemingway 17-yard pass from Alex Smith (Ryan Succop kick), 2:41. Chiefs 7–0. **Drive: 7 plays, 83 yards, 4:10.**

**Second quarter**

- DEN – Eric Decker 41-yard pass from Peyton Manning (Matt Prater kick), 14:53. Tied 7–7. **Drive: 6 plays, 79 yards, 2:48.**
- KC – Knile Davis 108-yard kickoff return (Ryan Succop kick), 14:40. Chiefs 14–7.
- KC – Anthony Fasano 12-yard pass from Alex Smith (Ryan Succop kick), 10:57. Chiefs 21–7. **Drive: 5 plays, 22 yards, 2:12.**
- DEN – Knowshon Moreno 3-yard pass from Peyton Manning (Matt Prater kick), 4:16. Chiefs 21–14. **Drive: 9 plays, 70 yards, 3:18.**

**Third quarter**

- DEN – Eric Decker 37-yard pass from Peyton Manning (Matt Prater kick), 11:51. Tied 21–21. **Drive: 7 plays, 80 yards, 3:09.**
- DEN – Eric Decker 15-yard pass from Peyton Manning (Matt Prater kick), 6:48. Broncos 28–21. **Drive: 5 plays, 92 yards, 2:08.**

**Fourth quarter**

- DEN – Eric Decker 1-yard pass from Peyton Manning (Matt Prater kick), 14:16. Broncos 35–21. **Drive: 10 plays, 95 yards, 5:45.**
- KC – Jamaal Charles 1-yard run (Ryan Succop kick), 6:32. Broncos 35–28. **Drive: 17 plays, 80 yards, 7:44.**

**Top passers**

- DEN – Peyton Manning – 22/35, 403 yards, 5 TD, 2 INT
- KC – Alex Smith – 26/42, 293 yards, 2 TD, INT

**Top rushers**

- DEN – Montee Ball – 13 rushes, 117 yards
- KC – Jamaal Charles – 19 rushes, 93 yards, TD

**Top receivers**

- DEN – Eric Decker – 8 receptions, 174 yards, 4 TD
- KC – Dwayne Bowe – 3 receptions, 56 yards

Kansas City led 21–7 at one point, but the Broncos came back to win 35–28 and sweep the Chiefs for the second straight season. With their third straight loss, the Chiefs fell to 9–3. They were the first 9–0 team in NFL history to lose three straight games following a 9–0 start.

==== Week 14: at Washington Redskins ====
Week 14: Kansas City Chiefs at Washington Redskins – Game summary

Quarter	1	2	3	4	Total
**Chiefs**	17	21	0	7	**45**
Redskins	0	10	0	0	**10**

at FedExField, Landover, Maryland

- Date: December 8
- Game time: 1:00 p.m. EST/12:00 p.m. CST
- Game weather: Snow, 30 °F (−1 °C)
- Game attendance: 56,247
- Referee: Carl Cheffers
- TV announcers (CBS): Kevin Harlan and Solomon Wilcots
- Recap, Game Book

Game information

**First quarter**

- KC – Ryan Succop 33-yard field goal, 11:30. Chiefs 3–0. **Drive: 8 plays, 52 yards, 3:30.**
- KC – Jamaal Charles 2-yard run (Ryan Succop kick), 5:52. Chiefs 10–0. **Drive: 5 plays, 13 yards, 2:54.**
- KC – Dwayne Bowe 22-yard pass from Alex Smith (Ryan Succop kick), 1:02. Chiefs 17–0. **Drive: 3 plays, 24 yards, 1:29.**

**Second quarter**

- KC – Jamaal Charles 5-yard pass from Alex Smith (Ryan Succop kick), 11:27. Chiefs 24–0. **Drive: 5 plays, 41 yards, 2:25.**
- KC – Dexter McCluster 74-yard punt return (Ryan Succop kick), 9:45. Chiefs 31–0.
- WAS – Logan Paulsen 7-yard pass from Robert Griffin III (Kai Forbath kick), 1:07. Chiefs 31–7. **Drive: 7 plays, 80 yards, 2:42.**
- KC – Quintin Demps 95-yard kickoff return (Ryan Succop kick), 0:53. Chiefs 38–7.
- WAS – Kai Forbath 50-yard field goal, 0:00. Chiefs 38–10. **Drive: 7 plays, 20 yards, 0:53.**

**Third quarter**

- No scoring plays.

**Fourth quarter**

- KC – Knile Davis 17-yard run (Ryan Succop kick), 13:37. Chiefs 45–10. **Drive: 6 plays, 80 yards, 3:16.**

**Top passers**

- KC – Alex Smith – 14/20, 137 yards, 2 TD
- WAS – Robert Griffin III – 12/26, 164 yards, TD, INT

**Top rushers**

- KC – Jamaal Charles – 19 rushes, 150 yards, TD
- WAS – Alfred Morris – 12 rushes, 31 yards

**Top receivers**

- KC – Dwayne Bowe – 4 receptions, 70 yards, TD
- WAS – Aldrick Robinson – 4 receptions, 67 yards

The Chiefs finally found their winning ways again, as they beat the Redskins 45–10 and led 38–10 at halftime. With the win, the Chiefs improved to 10–3.

==== Week 15: at Oakland Raiders ====
Week 15: Kansas City Chiefs at Oakland Raiders – Game summary

Quarter	1	2	3	4	Total
**Chiefs**	21	14	14	7	**56**
Raiders	3	14	14	0	**31**

at O.co Coliseum, Oakland, California

- Date: December 15
- Game time: 3:05 p.m. CST/1:05 p.m. PST
- Game weather: Sunny, 64 °F (18 °C)
- Game attendance: 49,571
- Referee: Clete Blakeman
- TV announcers (CBS): Ian Eagle and Dan Fouts
- Recap, Game Book

Game information

**First quarter**

- KC – Jamaal Charles 49-yard pass from Alex Smith (Ryan Succop kick), 14:38. Chiefs 7–0. **Drive: 1 play, 49 yards, 0:22.**
- OAK – Sebastian Janikowski 34-yard field goal, 11:05. Chiefs 7–3. **Drive: 8 plays, 65 yards, 3:33.**
- KC – Jamaal Charles 39-yard pass from Alex Smith (Ryan Succop kick), 7:27. Chiefs 14–3. **Drive: 7 plays, 68 yards, 3:38.**
- KC – Eric Berry 47-yard interception return (Ryan Succop kick), 5:07. Chiefs 21–3.

**Second quarter**

- OAK – Rashad Jennings 1-yard run (Sebastian Janikowski kick), 14:40. Chiefs 21–10. **Drive: 11 plays, 82 yards, 5:27.**
- KC – Jamaal Charles 1-yard run (Ryan Succop kick), 8:59. Chiefs 28–10. **Drive: 3 plays, 11 yards, 1:21.**
- KC – Jamaal Charles 16-yard pass from Alex Smith (Ryan Succop kick), 5:42. Chiefs 35–10. **Drive: 1 play, 16 yards, 0:06.**
- OAK – Rashad Jennings 1-yard run (Sebastian Janikowski kick), 3:00. Chiefs 35–17. **Drive: 8 plays, 80 yards, 2:42.**

**Third quarter**

- OAK – Andre Holmes 6-yard pass from Matt McGloin (Sebastian Janikowski kick), 12:01. Chiefs 35–24. **Drive: 5 plays, 74 yards, 2:59.**
- OAK – Mychal Rivera 14-yard pass from Matt McGloin (Sebastian Janikowski kick), 4:56. Chiefs 35–31. **Drive: 10 plays, 86 yards, 5:19.**
- KC – Jamaal Charles 71-yard pass from Alex Smith (Ryan Succop kick), 3:34. Chiefs 42–31. **Drive: 3 plays, 80 yards, 1:22.**
- KC – Sean McGrath 6-yard pass from Alex Smith (Ryan Succop kick), 1:20. Chiefs 49–31. **Drive: 4 plays, 28 yards, 2:01.**

**Fourth quarter**

- KC – Knile Davis 17-yard run (Ryan Succop kick), 8:19. Chiefs 56–31. **Drive: 4 plays, 45 yards, 2:41.**

**Top passers**

- KC – Alex Smith – 17/20, 287 yards, 5 TD
- OAK – Matt McGloin – 18/35, 297 yards, 2 TD, 4 INT

**Top rushers**

- KC – Knile Davis – 9 rushes, 34 yards, TD
- OAK – Rashad Jennings – 23 rushes, 91 yards, 2 TD

**Top receivers**

- KC – Jamaal Charles – 8 receptions, 195 yards, 4 TD
- OAK – Rod Streater – 4 receptions, 59 yards

Jamaal Charles scored five touchdowns for the Chiefs as they won 56–31 at Oakland. With the win, the Chiefs improved to 11–3.

==== Week 16: vs. Indianapolis Colts ====
Week 16: Indianapolis Colts at Kansas City Chiefs – Game summary

Quarter	1	2	3	4	Total
**Colts**	0	13	10	0	**23**
Chiefs	7	0	0	0	**7**

at Arrowhead Stadium, Kansas City, Missouri

- Date: December 22
- Game time: 12:00 p.m. CST
- Game weather: Cloudy, 22 °F (−6 °C)
- Game attendance: 75,396
- Referee: Tony Corrente
- TV announcers (CBS): Greg Gumbel and Dan Dierdorf
- Recap, Game Book

Game information

**First quarter**

- KC – Jamaal Charles 31-yard run (Ryan Succop kick), 11:05. Chiefs 7–0. **Drive: 4 plays, 59 yards, 1:48.**

**Second quarter**

- IND – Adam Vinatieri 46-yard field goal, 11:40. Chiefs 7–3. **Drive: 9 plays, 52 yards, 4:59.**
- IND – Donald Brown 33-yard pass from Andrew Luck (Adam Vinatieri kick), 9:23. Colts 10–7. **Drive: 2 plays, 33 yards, 0:16.**
- IND – Adam Vinatieri 45-yard field goal, 1:54. Colts 13–7. **Drive: 11 plays, 57 yards, 5:42.**

**Third quarter**

- IND – Donald Brown 51-yard run (Adam Vinatieri kick), 12:55. Colts 20–7. **Drive: 2 plays, 56 yards, 0:57.**
- IND – Adam Vinatieri 30-yard field goal, 2:47. Colts 23–7. **Drive: 15 plays, 59 yards, 7:50.**

**Fourth quarter**

- No scoring plays.

**Top passers**

- IND – Andrew Luck – 26/37, 341 yards, TD
- KC – Alex Smith – 16/28, 153 yards, INT

**Top rushers**

- IND – Donald Brown – 10 rushes, 79 yards, TD
- KC – Jamaal Charles – 13 rushes, 106 yards, TD

**Top receivers**

- IND – Griff Whalen – 7 receptions, 80 yards
- KC – Dwayne Bowe – 5 receptions, 46 yards

In a preview of the Wild Card game between these two teams, the Chiefs lost to Indianapolis 23–7 despite leading 7–0 at one point. With the loss, the Chiefs fell to 11–4.

==== Week 17: at San Diego Chargers ====
Week 17: Kansas City Chiefs at San Diego Chargers – Game summary

Quarter	1	2	3	4	OT	Total
Chiefs	14	7	3	0	0	**24**
**Chargers**	7	7	0	10	3	**27**

at Qualcomm Stadium, San Diego, California

- Date: December 29
- Game time: 3:25 p.m. CST/1:25 p.m. PST
- Game weather: Sunny, 73 °F (23 °C)
- Game attendance: 66,374
- Referee: Bill Leavy
- TV announcers (CBS): Marv Albert and Rich Gannon
- Recap, Game Book

Game information

**First quarter**

- KC – Knile Davis 17-yard run (Ryan Succop kick), 13:03. Chiefs 7–0. **Drive: 5 plays, 80 yards, 1:57.**
- SD – Ladarius Green 22-yard pass from Philip Rivers (Nick Novak kick), 10:37. Tied 7–7. **Drive: 5 plays, 78 yards, 2:26.**
- KC – Dexter McCluster 2-yard pass from Chase Daniel (Ryan Succop kick), 5:07. Chiefs 14–7. **Drive: 6 plays, 23 yards, 2:43.**

**Second quarter**

- SD – Antonio Gates 4-yard pass from Philip Rivers (Nick Novak kick), 14:56. Tied 14–14. **Drive: 10 plays, 80 yards, 5:11.**
- KC – Knile Davis 2-yard run (Ryan Succop kick), 1:07. Chiefs 21–14. **Drive: 11 plays, 86 yards, 5:57.**

**Third quarter**

- KC – Ryan Succop 46-yard field goal, 7:27. Chiefs 24–14. **Drive: 6 plays, 7 yards, 2:17.**

**Fourth quarter**

- SD – Eddie Royal 6-yard pass from Philip Rivers (Nick Novak kick), 11:45. Chiefs 24–21. **Drive: 10 plays, 69 yards, 4:29.**
- SD – Nick Novak 22-yard field goal, 3:21. Tied 24–24. **Drive: 9 plays, 66 yards, 4:16.**

**Overtime**

- SD – Nick Novak 36-yard field goal, 5:30. Chargers 27–24. **Drive: 16 plays, 62 yards, 9:30.**

**Top passers**

- KC – Chase Daniel – 21/30, 200 yards, TD
- SD – Philip Rivers – 22/33, 229 yards, 3 TD, INT

**Top rushers**

- KC – Knile Davis – 27 rushes, 81 yards, 2 TD
- SD – Ryan Mathews – 24 rushes, 144 yards

**Top receivers**

- KC – A. J. Jenkins – 3 receptions, 67 yards
- SD – Keenan Allen – 5 receptions, 89 yards

With no Alex Smith playing due to Kansas City resting their starters for the playoffs, it was up to Chase Daniel to guide the Chiefs. Kansas City missed a field goal at the end of regulation. The Chargers won in overtime on a field goal. With the loss, the Chiefs finished the regular season 11–5 and finished 2–4 against their division and 9–1 against the rest of the NFL.

=== Standings ===
==== Division ====
AFC West
	W	L	T	PCT	DIV	CONF	PF	PA	STK
^{(1)} Denver Broncos	13	3	0	.813	5–1	9–3	606	399	W2
^{(5)} Kansas City Chiefs	11	5	0	.688	2–4	7–5	430	305	L2
^{(6)} San Diego Chargers	9	7	0	.563	4–2	6–6	396	348	W4
Oakland Raiders	4	12	0	.250	1–5	4–8	322	453	L6

==== Conference ====
AFC
#	Team	Division	W	L	T	PCT	DIV	CONF	SOS	SOV	STK
**Division winners**
1	Denver Broncos	West	13	3	0	.813	5–1	9–3	.469	.423	W2
2	New England Patriots	East	12	4	0	.750	4–2	9–3	.473	.427	W2
3 (Note: Cincinnati defeated Indianapolis head-to-head (Week 14, 42–28).)	Cincinnati Bengals	North	11	5	0	.688	3–3	8–4	.480	.494	W2
4	Indianapolis Colts	South	11	5	0	.688	6–0	9–3	.484	.449	W3
**Wild cards**
5	Kansas City Chiefs	West	11	5	0	.688	2–4	7–5	.445	.335	L2
6	San Diego Chargers	West	9	7	0	.563	4–2	6–6	.496	.549	W4
**Did not qualify for the postseason**
7 (Note: Pittsburgh finished with a better division record than Baltimore.) (Note: Pittsburgh defeated the New York Jets head-to-head (Week 6, 19–6).)	Pittsburgh Steelers	North	8	8	0	.500	4–2	6–6	.469	.441	W3
8 (Note: Baltimore defeated the New York Jets head-to-head (Week 12, 19–3).)	Baltimore Ravens	North	8	8	0	.500	3–3	6–6	.484	.418	L2
9 (Note: The New York Jets finished with a better division record than Miami.)	New York Jets	East	8	8	0	.500	3–3	5–7	.488	.414	W2
10	Miami Dolphins	East	8	8	0	.500	2–4	7–5	.523	.523	L2
11	Tennessee Titans	South	7	9	0	.438	2–4	6–6	.504	.375	W2
12	Buffalo Bills	East	6	10	0	.375	3–3	5–7	.520	.500	L1
13 (Note: Oakland and Jacksonville finished with a better conference record than Cleveland.) (Note: Oakland defeated Jacksonville head-to-head (Week 2, 19–9).)	Oakland Raiders	West	4	12	0	.250	1–5	4–8	.523	.359	L6
14 (Note: Jacksonville defeated Cleveland head-to-head (Week 13, 32–28).)	Jacksonville Jaguars	South	4	12	0	.250	3–3	4–8	.504	.234	L3
15	Cleveland Browns	North	4	12	0	.250	2–4	3–9	.516	.477	L7
16	Houston Texans	South	2	14	0	.125	1–5	2–10	.559	.500	L14
**Tiebreakers** (Note: When breaking ties for three or more teams under the NFL's rules, they are first broken within divisions, then comparing only the highest ranked remaining team from each division.)

== Postseason ==
=== Schedule ===
Round	Date	Opponent (seed)	Result	Record	Venue	Recap
Wild Card	January 4	at Indianapolis Colts (4)	L 44–45	0–1	Lucas Oil Stadium	Recap

=== Game summaries ===
==== AFC Wild Card Playoffs: at (4) Indianapolis Colts ====
AFC Wild Card Playoffs: (5) Kansas City Chiefs at (4) Indianapolis Colts – Game summary

Quarter	1	2	3	4	Total
Chiefs	10	21	10	3	44
Colts	7	3	21	14	45

at Lucas Oil Stadium, Indianapolis, Indiana

- Date: January 4, 2014
- Game time: 4:35 p.m. EST/3:35 p.m. CST
- Game weather: None (retractable roof closed)
- Game attendance: 63,551
- Referee: Walt Anderson
- TV announcers (NBC): Dan Hicks, Mike Mayock and Alex Flanagan
- Recap, Game Book

Game information

First quarter

- KC – Dwayne Bowe 6-yard pass from Alex Smith (Ryan Succop kick), 8:11. Chiefs 7–0. Drive: 14 plays, 82 yards, 6:49.
- IND – T. Y. Hilton 10-yard pass from Andrew Luck (Adam Vinatieri kick), 4:34. Tied 7–7. Drive: 7 plays, 74 yards, 3:37.
- KC – Ryan Succop 19-yard field goal, 0:53. Chiefs 10–7. Drive: 7 plays, 73 yards, 6:41.

Second quarter

- KC – Donnie Avery 79-yard pass from Alex Smith (Ryan Succop kick), 14:39. Chiefs 17–7. Drive: 3 plays, 79 yards, 0:21.
- KC – Anthony Sherman 5-yard pass from Alex Smith (Ryan Succop kick), 13:05. Chiefs 24–7. Drive: 3 plays, 17 yards, 1:23.
- IND – Adam Vinatieri 37-yard field goal, 9:14. Chiefs 24–10. Drive: 12 plays, 61 yards, 3:51.
- KC – Knile Davis 4-yard run (Ryan Succop kick), 1:51. Chiefs 31–10. Drive: 15 plays, 81 yards, 7:23.

Third quarter

- KC – Knile Davis 10-yard pass from Alex Smith (Ryan Succop kick), 13:39. Chiefs 38–10. Drive: 3 plays, 18 yards, 1:15.
- IND – Donald Brown 10-yard run (Adam Vinatieri kick), 11:47. Chiefs 38–17. Drive: 5 plays, 80 yards, 1:52.
- IND – Donald Brown 3-yard pass from Andrew Luck (Adam Vinatieri kick), 7:32. Chiefs 38–24. Drive: 5 plays, 41 yards, 1:28.
- KC – Ryan Succop 42-yard field goal, 4:12. Chiefs 41–24. Drive: 4 plays, 4 yards, 1:32.
- IND – Coby Fleener 12-yard pass from Andrew Luck (Adam Vinatieri kick), 2:31. Chiefs 41–31. Drive: 6 plays, 80 yards, 1:41.

Fourth quarter

- IND – Andrew Luck 5-yard fumble recovery (Adam Vinatieri kick), 10:38. Chiefs 41–38. Drive: 12 plays, 90 yards, 4:02.
- KC – Ryan Succop 43-yard field goal, 5:36. Chiefs 44–38. Drive: 11 plays, 58 yards, 5:02.
- IND – T. Y. Hilton 64-yard pass from Andrew Luck (Adam Vinatieri kick), 4:21. Colts 45–44. Drive: 4 plays, 80 yards, 1:15.

Top passers

- KC – Alex Smith – 30/46, 378 yards, 4 TD
- IND – Andrew Luck – 29/45, 443 yards, 4 TD, 3 INT

Top rushers

- KC – Knile Davis – 18 rushes, 67 yards, TD
- IND – Donald Brown – 11 rushes, 55 yards, TD

Top receivers

- KC – Dwayne Bowe – 8 receptions, 150 yards, TD
- IND – T. Y. Hilton – 13 receptions, 224 yards, 2 TD
