= Marcus Cooper (American football) =

American football player (born 1990)

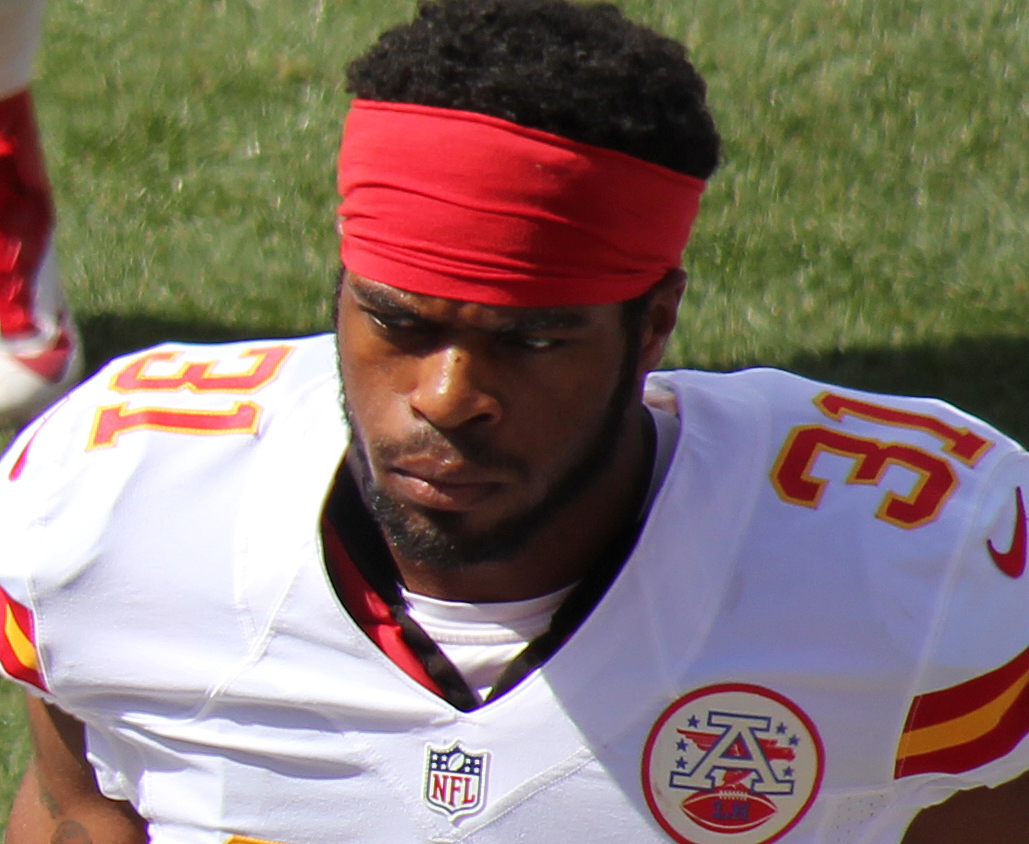
- Cooper with the Kansas City Chiefs in 2014

No. 31, 41, 21
- Position: Cornerback

Personal information
- Born: February 1, 1990 (age 36); Bloomfield, Connecticut, U.S.
- Listed height: 6 ft 2 in (1.88 m)
- Listed weight: 197 lb (89 kg)

Career information
- High school: Bloomfield
- College: Rutgers (2008–2012)
- NFL draft: 2013: 7th round, 252nd overall pick

Career history
- San Francisco 49ers (2013)*; Kansas City Chiefs (2013–2015); Arizona Cardinals (2016); Chicago Bears (2017–2018); Detroit Lions (2018); New York Jets (2019)*
- * Offseason or practice squad member only

Career NFL statistics
- Total tackles: 155
- Forced fumbles: 2
- Touchdowns: 2
- Fumble recoveries: 1
- Interceptions: 7
- Pass deflections: 36
- Stats at Pro Football Reference

Marcus Cooper Sr. (born February 1, 1990) is an American former professional football player who was a cornerback in the National Football League (NFL). He was selected by the San Francisco 49ers in the seventh round of the 2013 NFL draft. He played college football for the Rutgers Scarlet Knights. Cooper was also a member of the Kansas City Chiefs, Arizona Cardinals, Chicago Bears, Detroit Lions, and New York Jets.

== Early life ==
Cooper attended Bloomfield High School in Bloomfield, Connecticut, where he was a two-sport star in football and track. In football, he finished his career as the school's all-time leader in receiving yards, touchdowns, receptions and consecutive games with a touchdown. He also ranks second in Connecticut history in career receiving yards (3,014), touchdown receptions (43), and consecutive games with a touchdown reception (13).

Also an standout track & field athlete, Cooper was a state qualifier in the 100 meters. At the 2008 Bloomfield Invitational, he took gold in the long jump, with a leap of 6.48 meters (21 ft, 1 in), while also earning second-place finishes in both the 100-meter dash (10.79 s) and the high jump (2.04 m) events. In addition, he also ran the 55-meter dash in 6.47 seconds and clocked a 4.45-second 40-yard dash.

== College career ==
Cooper played all four years for the Rutgers Scarlet Knights, but saw limited playing time as a starter during his first two seasons. He switched to cornerback in his final year at Rutgers and his playing time increased immensely along with his production.

== Professional career ==
=== Pre-draft ===
Coming out of Rutgers, Cooper was projected by the majority of NFL draft experts and analysts to be selected in the seventh round or be a priority undrafted free agent signing immediately after the conclusion of the draft. He did not receive an invitation to the NFL Combine due to the fact that Cooper was not a highly projected prospect. On March 13, 2013, Cooper participated at Rutgers pro day and opted to perform all of the combine and positional drills for the team representatives and scouts from all 32 NFL teams. His overall performance was seen as a success that showcased his ability. He was also ranked the 40th best at his cornerback position as a prospect in the draft by NFLDraftScout.com.

Pre-draft measurables
Height	Weight	Arm length	Hand span	Wingspan	40-yard dash	10-yard split	20-yard split	20-yard shuttle	Three-cone drill	Vertical jump	Broad jump	Bench press
6 ft 2 1/8 in (1.88 m)	192 lb (87 kg)	32 3/4 in (0.83 m)	9 1/4 in (0.23 m)	6 ft 3 1/4 in (1.91 m)	4.45 s	1.59 s	2.61 s	4.42 s	6.89 s	39.5 in (1.00 m)	10 ft 9 in (3.28 m)	20 reps
All values from Rutger's Pro Day

=== San Francisco 49ers ===
The San Francisco 49ers selected Cooper in the seventh round (252nd overall) of the 2013 NFL draft. He was the 29th and final cornerback selected during the draft.

On May 10, 2013, the 49ers signed Cooper to a four-year, $2.20 million contract with a signing bonus of $45,896.

He competed with Tramaine Brock, Chris Culliver, Darryl Morris, and Lowell Rose throughout training camp for a job as a backup cornerback. On August 31, 2013, the San Francisco 49ers waived Cooper as part of their final roster cuts.

=== Kansas City Chiefs ===
==== 2013 ====
On September 1, 2013, the Kansas City Chiefs claimed him off waivers and added him to their active roster. Upon arrival, head coach Andy Reid named Cooper the Chiefs' fourth cornerback on their depth chart behind veterans Sean Smith, Brandon Flowers, and Dunta Robinson.

He made his professional regular season debut during the Chiefs' season-opening 28–2 victory over the Jacksonville Jaguars and finished with one tackle. On September 29, 2013, Cooper earned his first career start in a 31–7 win over the New York Giants and recorded a tackle and two pass deflections. He started in place of Brandon Flowers, who was unable to play due to a knee injury. The following week, he recovered a fumble in the end zone for a touchdown, made three combined tackles, three pass deflections, and made the first interception of his career, picking off Tennessee Titans' quarterback Ryan Fitzpatrick in a 26–17 victory. In Week 5, Cooper earned five solo tackles, a season-high four pass deflections, and intercepted a pass from Terrelle Pryor during a 24–7 victory over the Oakland Raiders. On December 1, 2013, Cooper started his fifth game of his rookie season and recorded a season-high eight combined tackles, defended a pass, and intercepted a pass from Peyton Manning during a 35–28 loss to the Denver Broncos, a game in which he also gave up several touchdowns to Broncos wide receiver Eric Decker in Decker's 4 touchdown performance.

He finished with a total of 44 combined tackles (41 solo), a career-high 18 pass deflections, and three interceptions in six starts and 16 games. Cooper won the Mack Lee Hill Award at the end of the 2013 season for being the most productive rookie on the team. After finishing second in the AFC West with an 11–5 record the Kansas City Chiefs received a playoff berth. On January 4, 2014, Cooper appeared in his first career postseason game and recorded two combined tackles and defended a pass as the Chiefs lost to the Indianapolis Colts 44–45 in the AFC Wildcard game.

==== 2014 ====
Cooper entered a competition in training camp for the vacant starting cornerback position left by the departure of Brandon Flowers. He competed with Ron Parker, Chris Owens, Phillip Gaines, and DeMarcus Van Dyke. He was named the starting cornerback, opposite Sean Smith, to begin the regular season.

He missed the season-opener against the Tennessee Titans due to an ankle injury he suffered during practice. On September 14, 2014, Cooper made his season debut and recorded five combined tackles and defended two passes during a 17–24 loss to the Denver Broncos. The following week, he recorded a season-high six combined tackles in a 34–15 victory over the Miami Dolphins. Cooper lost his starting cornerback job to Jamell Fleming after returning from a Week 6 bye. For the remainder of the season his role was extremely diminished, even after Fleming missed multiple games due to a hamstring injury. He was a healthy scratch for Weeks 16 and 17. He finished with a total of 21 solo tackles and three pass deflections in 13 games and four starts.

==== 2015 ====
Cooper returned to training camp in 2015, facing stiff competition from Phillip Gaines, Marcus Peters, Jamell Fleming, Sanders Commings, and Steven Nelson as all were vying for the starting cornerback job. Head coach Andy Reid named Cooper the fourth cornerback on the Chiefs depth chart to begin the regular season, behind Sean Smith, Marcus Peters, and Jamell Fleming.

He was inactive for the Chiefs' 27–20 season-opening victory against the Houston Texans. On September 28, 2015, Cooper earned his first start of the season after Sean Smith was suspended for the first three games of the season for a D.U.I. arrest. He finished the 28–38 loss to the Green Bay Packers with only one tackle. From Week 5 to Week 10, Cooper was a healthy scratch and was deactivated. He completed his dismal 2015 season with only two combined tackles in ten games and one start. Cooper was deactivated for both of the Chiefs postseason games after finishing 11–5.

Cooper attended training camp with the Chiefs in 2016. He fell further down the depth chart behind Marcus Peters, Phillip Gaines, Steven Nelson, KeiVarae Russell, and Eric Murray.

=== Arizona Cardinals ===
On September 2, 2016, the Kansas City Chiefs traded Cooper to the Arizona Cardinals in exchange for a conditional seventh round draft pick in the 2018 NFL draft. The Cardinals acquired him after losing Mike Jenkins to an ACL tear and Alan Ball to a quadriceps injury.

Upon his arrival, Cooper was named the fourth cornerback on the depth chart, behind Patrick Peterson, Justin Bethel, and Brandon Williams.

He made his Arizona Cardinals debut in their season-opener, as they lost to the New England Patriots 21–23. On September 18, 2016, Cooper recorded seven combined tackles, three pass deflections, a touchdown, and intercepted Tampa Bay Buccaneers' quarterback Jameis Winston twice during a 40–7 victory. His third quarter interception for a 60-yard touchdown was his first career touchdown. Head coach Bruce Arians named Cooper the starting cornerback after he performed well in Week 2, replacing Brandon Williams. On September 25, 2016, Cooper earned his first start as a member of the Cardinals and made seven combined tackles and deflected a pass during an 18–34 loss to the Buffalo Bills. In Week 5, he collected three combined tackles, a pass deflection, and intercepted a pass attempt by San Francisco 49ers' quarterback Blaine Gabbert in a 33–21 victory. During a Week 1 matchup against the Atlanta Falcons, Cooper had a career-high nine solo tackle performance as the Cardinals were defeated 19–38. He completed his only season in Arizona with a career-high 69 combined tackles (63 solo), 11 pass deflections, and a career-high four interceptions in 13 starts and 15 games. Cooper led the Cardinals in interceptions in 2016 with four and was an alternate for the 2017 Pro Bowl. The Arizona Cardinals finished with a dismal 7-8-1 record and did not receive a playoff berth, making it the first time in they finished with a losing season during the Bruce Arians head coaching era.

Cooper became a free agent for the first time in his career after the conclusion of the 2016. He drew interest and spoke to the Pittsburgh Steelers, New York Jets, and Chicago Bears. Arizona Cardinals' Head coach Bruce Arians expressed interest into resigning him but stated that, "The price looks like its going pretty high for him, so we'll wait and see."

=== Chicago Bears ===
On March 11, 2017, the Chicago Bears signed Cooper to a three-year, $16 million contract that includes $8 million guaranteed and a signing bonus of $1.5 million. The Arizona Cardinals received a compensatory sixth round draft pick in the 2018 NFL Draft after losing Cooper in free agency.

He attended Chicago Bears' training camp and competed for one of the vacant starting cornerback jobs left after the Bears released Tracy Porter and Jacoby Glenn. Head coach John Fox named Cooper the starting cornerback to begin the regular season, opposite Prince Amukamara, after winning the job over Bryce Callahan, Johnthan Banks, Kyle Fuller, Sherrick McManis, Deiondre' Hall, Cre'Von LeBlanc, and B. W. Webb.

Cooper started the Chicago Bears' season-opener against the Atlanta Falcons and made four solo tackles and defended a pass during the 23–17 loss. He was unable to play in the Bears' Week 6 matchup against the Minnesota Vikings due to a back injury. After Prince Amukamara missed the first two games he started in place of Cooper in Week 3 and supplanted him as the starter, along with Kyle Fuller. He recovered a blocked field goal attempt during the Week 3 matchup against the Steelers, but slowed down, allowing tight end Vance McDonald to strip the ball from him, preventing a touchdown. Cooper appeared in Week 6 and 7, he was limited and did not record a stat in both games.

On March 14, 2018, Cooper was released by the Bears. On March 27, he re-signed with the Bears. He was released on November 21.

=== Detroit Lions ===
On November 22, 2018, Cooper was claimed off waivers by the Detroit Lions.

On March 16, 2019, Cooper signed a one-year contract to remain with the Lions. He was released on August 12, 2019.

=== New York Jets ===
On August 14, 2019, Cooper was signed by the New York Jets. He was released on August 31, 2019.

== NFL career statistics ==
Legend
	Led the league
**Bold**	Career high

=== Regular season ===
Year	Team	Games		Tackles					Interceptions					Fumbles			
Year	Team	GP	GS	Cmb	Solo	Ast	Sck	TFL	Int	Yds	TD	Lng	PD	FF	FR	Yds	TD
2013	KAN	**16**	6	44	41	3	0.0	0	3	32	0	20	**19**	**1**	**1**	0	**1**
2014	KAN	13	4	21	21	0	0.0	0	0	0	0	0	3	0	0	0	0
2015	KAN	10	1	2	2	0	0.0	0	0	0	0	0	0	0	0	0	0
2016	ARI	15	**13**	**69**	**63**	**6**	0.0	0	**4**	**95**	**1**	**60**	11	0	0	0	0
2017	CHI	15	4	18	17	1	0.0	0	0	0	0	0	3	0	0	0	0
2018	CHI	2	0	0	0	0	0.0	0	0	0	0	0	0	0	0	0	0
2018	DET	4	0	1	1	0	0.0	0	0	0	0	0	0	**1**	0	0	0
		75	28	155	145	10	0.0	0	7	127	1	60	36	2	1	0	1

=== Playoffs ===
Year	Team	Games		Tackles					Interceptions					Fumbles			
Year	Team	GP	GS	Cmb	Solo	Ast	Sck	TFL	Int	Yds	TD	Lng	PD	FF	FR	Yds	TD
2013	KAN	**1**	0	**2**	**1**	**1**	0.0	0	0	0	0	0	**1**	0	0	0	0
		1	0	2	1	1	0.0	0	0	0	0	0	1	0	0	0	0
