= Ron Parker =

American football player (born 1987)

No. 36, 25, 38
- Position: Safety

Personal information
- Born: August 17, 1987 (age 39); St. Helena Island, South Carolina, U.S.
- Listed height: 6 ft 0 in (1.83 m)
- Listed weight: 206 lb (93 kg)

Career information
- High school: Beaufort (Beaufort, South Carolina)
- College: Newberry
- NFL draft: 2011: undrafted

Career history
- Seattle Seahawks (2011)*; Oakland Raiders (2011); Seattle Seahawks (2011); Carolina Panthers (2012); Seattle Seahawks (2012); Kansas City Chiefs (2013–2017); Atlanta Falcons (2018)*; Kansas City Chiefs (2018)
- * Offseason or practice squad member only

Career NFL statistics
- Total tackles: 397
- Sacks: 8.0
- Forced fumbles: 5
- Pass deflections: 48
- Interceptions: 11
- Defensive touchdowns: 1
- Stats at Pro Football Reference

Ron Parker (born August 17, 1987) is an American former professional football player who was a safety in the National Football League (NFL). He played college football for the Newberry Wolves and was signed by the Seattle Seahawks as an undrafted free agent in 2011. He was also a member of the Oakland Raiders, Carolina Panthers, Kansas City Chiefs and Atlanta Falcons.

== Early life ==
Parker's father, Ronzo, was a truck driver and his mother Rose worked at a Montessori public school. Parker has a twin named Don and he has an older sister Ronique. Parker was raised near Beaufort, South Carolina. Attended Beaufort High School, Lady's Island Middle and St Helena Elementary.

== College career ==
Parker attended Newberry College and played for the Wolves in the South Atlantic Conference in NCAA Division II. In 2009, he was selected to the first team All-American by Don Hansen's Football Gazette and to the second team All-American by D2Football.com and Daktronics. Parker also was selected to the first team all-Super Region selection by Daktronics and also was named to the all-South Atlantic Conference first team. Parker was selected to the first team All-American by D2Football.com and Don Hansen's Football Gazette. Parker was selected to the second team All-American by Daktronics and a third team Little All-American by the Associated Press following his senior season.

== Professional career ==
Pre-draft measurables
Height	Weight	40-yard dash	10-yard split	20-yard split	20-yard shuttle	Three-cone drill	Vertical jump	Broad jump	Bench press
5 ft 11 7/8 in (1.83 m)	206 lb (93 kg)	4.35 s	1.51 s	2.49 s	4.15 s	6.74 s	32.0 in (0.81 m)	10 ft 3 in (3.12 m)	17 reps
All values are from Newberry's Pro Day

=== Seattle Seahawks (first stint) ===
Parker went undrafted in the 2011 NFL draft. On July 26, 2011, the Seattle Seahawks signed Parker to a three-year, $1.39 million contract that includes a signing bonus of $1,000 as an undrafted free agent. He was released on August 31, but re-signed to the practice squad on September 5. On September 22, the Seahawks released Parker.

=== Oakland Raiders ===
On September 26, 2011, the Oakland Raiders signed Parker to their practice squad. On October 1, he was promoted to the Raiders' active roster. On October 2, Parker made his professional regular season debut during a 31–19 loss to the New England Patriots in Week 4. On October 22, the Raiders released Parker.

=== Seattle Seahawks (second stint) ===
On October 24, 2011, the Seattle Seahawks claimed Parker off waivers. Head coach Pete Carroll named Parker the sixth cornerback on the depth chart, behind Richard Sherman, Brandon Browner, Byron Maxwell, Roy Lewis, and Kennard Cox. Parker appeared in five games as a rookie in 2011, but was unable to record a statistic.

Throughout training camp in 2012, Parker competed for a roster spot as a backup cornerback against Roy Lewis, Phillip Adams, Jeremy Lane, and Coye Francies. On August 26, 2012, the Seattle Seahawks waived Parker.

=== Carolina Panthers ===
On September 2, 2012, the Carolina Panthers signed Parker to their practice squad. On October 6, Parker was promoted to their active roster. In a Week 5 game against the Seattle Seahawks, Parker recorded his first career tackle during a 16–12 loss. The following day, Carolina released Parker, but re-signed him to their practice squad two days later. On October 17, Parker was promoted to the active roster to replace an injured Kenny Onatolu, then later released and signed to the practice squad on November 7.

=== Seattle Seahawks (third stint) ===
On December 5, 2012, Parker was signed by the Seahawks off the Panthers' practice squad. On December 16, Parker collected a season-high two solo tackles in the Seahawks' 50–17 victory against the Buffalo Bills in Week 15. On December 28, Parker was released, but signed to the practice squad three days later. Parker finished the 2012 NFL season with three solo tackles in five games and zero starts.

On January 15, 2013, the Seattle Seahawks signed Parker to a two-year, $1.20 million contract.

Throughout training camp, Parker competed for a roster spot as a backup cornerback against DeShawn Shead, Will Blackmon, Byron Maxwell, Tharold Simon, and Walter Thurmond. On August 13, Parker was released.

=== Kansas City Chiefs (first stint) ===
==== 2013 ====
On September 1, 2013, the Kansas City Chiefs claimed Parker off of waivers, replacing Jalil Brown. Head coach Andy Reid named Parker the fifth cornerback on the depth chart to start the regular season, behind Sean Smith, Brandon Flowers, Dunta Robinson, and Marcus Cooper.

On September 15, Parker recorded one tackle and made his first career sack on Cowboys' quarterback Tony Romo during the Chiefs' 17–16 win against the Dallas Cowboys in Week 2. On December 15, in the Chiefs' 56–31 victory against the Oakland Raiders in Week 15, Parker broke up a pass and made his first career interception off a pass attempt by Raiders' quarterback Terrelle Pryor. While it was originally intended for tight end Nick Kasa, Parker returned it for a 15-yard gain in the fourth quarter. In Week 17, Parker earned his first career start and collected a season-high six solo tackles, broke up two passes, and intercepted a pass by quarterback Philip Rivers during a 27–24 loss against the San Diego Chargers. He finished the 2013 NFL season with 17 solo tackles, three pass deflections, two interceptions and one sack, playing in 16 games and starting in one.

The Kansas City Chiefs finished the 2013 NFL season as second in the AFC West with an 11–5 record and earned a Wild Card berth. On January 4, 2014, Parker appeared in his first career post-season game and made one solo tackle in their 45–44 loss to the Indianapolis Colts in the AFC Wild Card Game.

==== 2014 ====
Throughout training camp, Parker competed to be a starting cornerback against Sean Smith, Marcus Cooper, and Phillip Gaines. Reid named Parker as a starting cornerback for the 2014 season. He started alongside CB Marcus Cooper, and safeties Eric Berry and Husain Abdullah.

In the Kansas City Chiefs' season-opener against the Tennessee Titans, he recorded six solo tackles and broke up a pass in their 26-10 loss. For Weeks 3 through 8, Parker started at strong safety in place of Eric Berry, who was inactive with an ankle injury. On October 26, Parker made four solo tackles, a pass deflection, a sack, and intercepted a pass during a 34–7 victory against the St. Louis Rams in Week 8. In Week 11, he made a season-high 11 solo tackles in the Chiefs' 24–20 win against the Seattle Seahawks. Parker was moved to strong safety for the last five games of the regular season, after Eric Berry was diagnosed with Hodgkin's lymphoma. He finished the 2014 NFL season with a career-high 94 combined tackles (81 solo), 12 pass deflections, one interception, one sack, and a forced fumble, playing in 16 games with 15 starts.

==== 2015 ====
Parker became an unrestricted free agent in 2015 and received interest from multiple teams, including the Tampa Bay Buccaneers, the Atlanta Falcons, the New York Giants, and the New York Jets. On March 16, 2015, the Kansas City Chiefs signed Parker to a five-year, $30 million contract that included $8 million guaranteed, and a signing bonus of $5 million.

Parker entered training camp slated as the starting strong safety. Reid named him starter, alongside free safety Husain Abdullah.

In Week 4, he collected a season-high eight combined tackles in the Chiefs' 36-21 loss to the Cincinnati Bengals. On November 1, Parker recorded four solo tackles and made a season-high two sacks on Lions' quarterback Matthew Stafford during a 45–10 win against the Detroit Lions in Week 8.

He amassed a total of five sacks that season, setting a Chiefs single-season sack record for defensive backs. He finished the season with 78 tackles, 12 passes defensed, a forced fumble, and three interceptions.

Parker set a franchise record for most career sacks by a defensive back in Week 17, when he sacked Oakland Raiders quarterback Derek Carr.

==== 2016 ====
In the 2016 season, Parker started all 16 games for the Chiefs at safety again, recording 61 tackles, 12 passes defensed, two forced fumbles, and an interception.

==== 2017 ====
In 2017, Parker once again started all 16 games for Kansas City. He made 67 tackles and recorded two interceptions. He also recovered two fumbles.

On March 12, 2018, after refusing to take a pay cut for the team to make cap space, Parker was released by the Chiefs after five seasons.

=== Atlanta Falcons ===
On June 25, 2018, Parker signed with the Atlanta Falcons. After playing in 4 preseason games and making a combined six tackles, he was released on August 31.

=== Kansas City Chiefs (second stint) ===
For the second time in his career, Parker signed with the Kansas City Chiefs on September 2, 2018. He played in 15 games with 14 starts, finishing third on the team with 77 tackles, along with five passes deflected and two interceptions. On October 21, Parker scored his first NFL touchdown after intercepting a pass from Cincinnati Bengals quarterback Andy Dalton and returning it 33 yards.

On January 15, 2019, after activating Laurent Duvernay-Tardif from injured reserve, Parker was released by the Chiefs.

=== Retirement ===
After remaining a free agent for the 2019 season, Parker announced his retirement on January 6, 2020.

== NFL career statistics ==
Legend
**Bold**	Career high

=== Regular season ===
Year	Team	Games		Tackles					Interceptions					Fumbles			
Year	Team	GP	GS	Cmb	Solo	Ast	Sck	TFL	Int	Yds	TD	Lng	PD	FF	FR	Yds	TD
2011	OAK	3	0	0	0	0	0.0	0	0	0	0	0	0	0	0	0	0
2011	SEA	2	0	0	0	0	0.0	0	0	0	0	0	0	0	0	0	0
2012	CAR	3	0	1	1	0	0.0	0	0	0	0	0	0	0	0	0	0
2012	SEA	2	0	2	2	0	0.0	0	0	0	0	0	0	0	0	0	0
2013	KAN	**16**	1	17	17	0	1.0	0	2	29	0	15	3	1	**3**	**22**	0
2014	KAN	**16**	15	**94**	**84**	10	1.0	2	1	10	0	10	**12**	1	0	0	0
2015	KAN	**16**	**16**	78	67	11	**5.0**	**6**	**3**	5	0	5	**12**	1	0	0	0
2016	KAN	**16**	**16**	61	52	9	0.0	1	1	1	0	1	**12**	**2**	0	0	0
2017	KAN	15	15	67	58	9	0.0	0	2	0	0	0	4	0	2	7	0
2018	KAN	15	14	77	64	**13**	1.0	1	2	**33**	**1**	**33**	5	0	0	0	0
		104	77	397	345	52	8.0	10	11	78	1	33	48	5	5	29	0

=== Playoffs ===
Year	Team	Games		Tackles					Interceptions					Fumbles			
Year	Team	GP	GS	Cmb	Solo	Ast	Sck	TFL	Int	Yds	TD	Lng	PD	FF	FR	Yds	TD
2013	KAN	1	0	1	1	0	0.0	0	0	0	0	0	0	0	0	0	0
2015	KAN	**2**	**2**	**10**	**6**	**4**	0.0	0	0	0	0	0	0	0	0	0	0
2016	KAN	1	1	5	4	1	0.0	0	0	0	0	0	0	0	0	0	0
2017	KAN	1	1	5	5	0	0.0	0	0	0	0	0	0	0	0	0	0
2018	KAN	1	0	0	0	0	0.0	0	0	0	0	0	0	0	0	0	0
		6	4	21	16	5	0.0	0	0	0	0	0	0	0	0	0	0
