= Sean McGrath (American football) =

American football player and coach (born 1987)

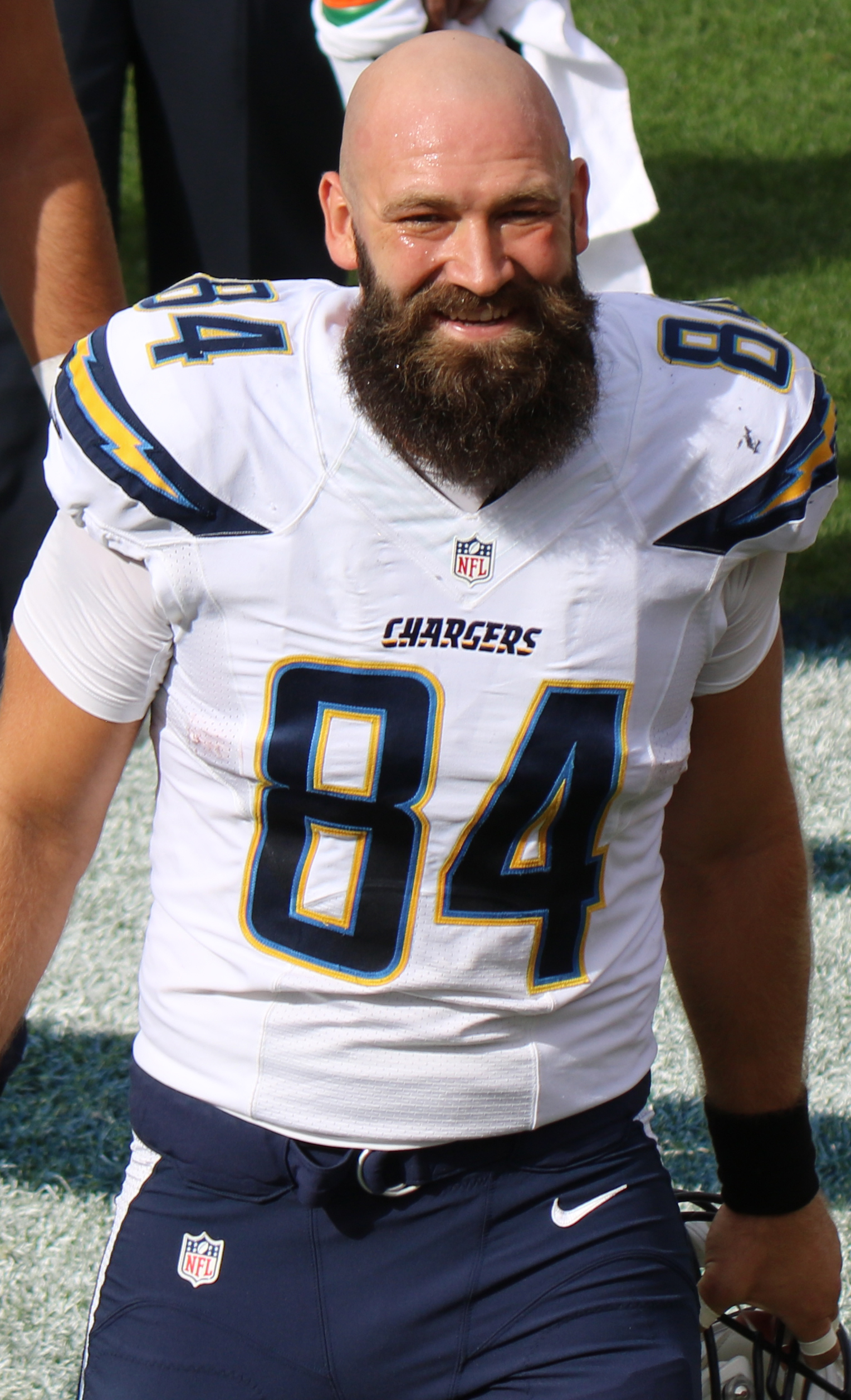
- McGrath with the Chargers in 2016

Missouri Southern Lions
- Title: Tight ends coach

Personal information
- Born: December 3, 1987 (age 38); Mundelein, Illinois, U.S.
- Listed height: 6 ft 5 in (1.96 m)
- Listed weight: 257 lb (117 kg)

Career information
- High school: Carmel (Mundelein, Illinois)
- College: Eastern Illinois (2006–2008); Henderson State (2010–2011)
- NFL draft: 2012: undrafted

Career history

Playing
- Seattle Seahawks (2012); Kansas City Chiefs (2013); Indianapolis Colts (2015)*; San Diego / Los Angeles Chargers (2015–2017); Detroit Lions (2018)*
- * Offseason or practice squad member only

Coaching
- Missouri Southern (2021–present)

Career NFL statistics
- Receptions: 32
- Receiving yards: 373
- Receiving average: 11.7
- Receiving touchdowns: 2
- Stats at Pro Football Reference

Sean McGrath (born December 3, 1987) is an American football tight ends coach at Missouri Southern State University and a former tight end. He played college football at Eastern Illinois and Henderson State, and signed with the Seattle Seahawks as an undrafted free agent in 2012. McGrath also played for the Kansas City Chiefs and San Diego / Los Angeles Chargers.

== College career ==
McGrath began his college football career at Eastern Illinois University, where he red-shirted in 2006, and played sparingly in 2007, accumulating no statistics as a tight end and special teams player. However, in 2008 he started at tight end and caught 28 passes for 301 yards and three touchdowns. After being dismissed from the team for a violation of teams rules, he transferred to Henderson State where he played tight end. In 2010, his first season with the Reddies, he caught 55 passes for 656 yards and four touchdowns. However, he went undrafted following the 2011 season in which an injury limited him to just four catches for 49 yards in four games.

== Professional career ==
=== Seattle Seahawks ===
In April 2012, he signed with the Seattle Seahawks as an undrafted free agent. On August 31, 2012, he was released. On September 1, 2012, he was signed to the practice squad. On September 27, he was released from the practice squad. On October 2, 2012, he was re-signed to the practice squad. On December 18, 2012, he was promoted to the active roster after the team released tight end Evan Moore.

=== Kansas City Chiefs ===
The Chiefs claimed McGrath off waivers on September 1, 2013. With nagging injuries to Anthony Fasano and Travis Kelce, McGrath was pushed into a starting role. He responded well, catching six passes for sixty-two yards in his first three games. Then went on to face the New York Giants in Week 4 at home leaving with five catches for sixty-four yards and a touchdown on September 29, 2013.

McGrath failed to report to training camp for the 2014 season, and was then subsequently place on the reserve/did not report list. On July 26, 2014, Chiefs head coach Andy Reid announced that McGrath planned to retire.

=== Indianapolis Colts ===
McGrath came out of retirement and signed with the Indianapolis Colts in June 2015. On September 5, 2015, he was waived by the Colts. After signing to the practice squad in October 2015, he was released on October 26.

=== San Diego / Los Angeles Chargers ===
On November 10, 2015, McGrath was signed by the Chargers. On November 21, 2015, he was waived. On November 24, 2015, he was signed to the practice squad. On December 28, 2015, McGrath was promoted to the 53-man roster.

=== Detroit Lions ===
On June 14, 2018, McGrath signed with the Detroit Lions. He was released on September 1, 2018.

== Coaching career ==
He was hired as the tight ends coach at Missouri Southern State University in 2021.
