= Sean Smith (cornerback) =

American football player (born 1987)

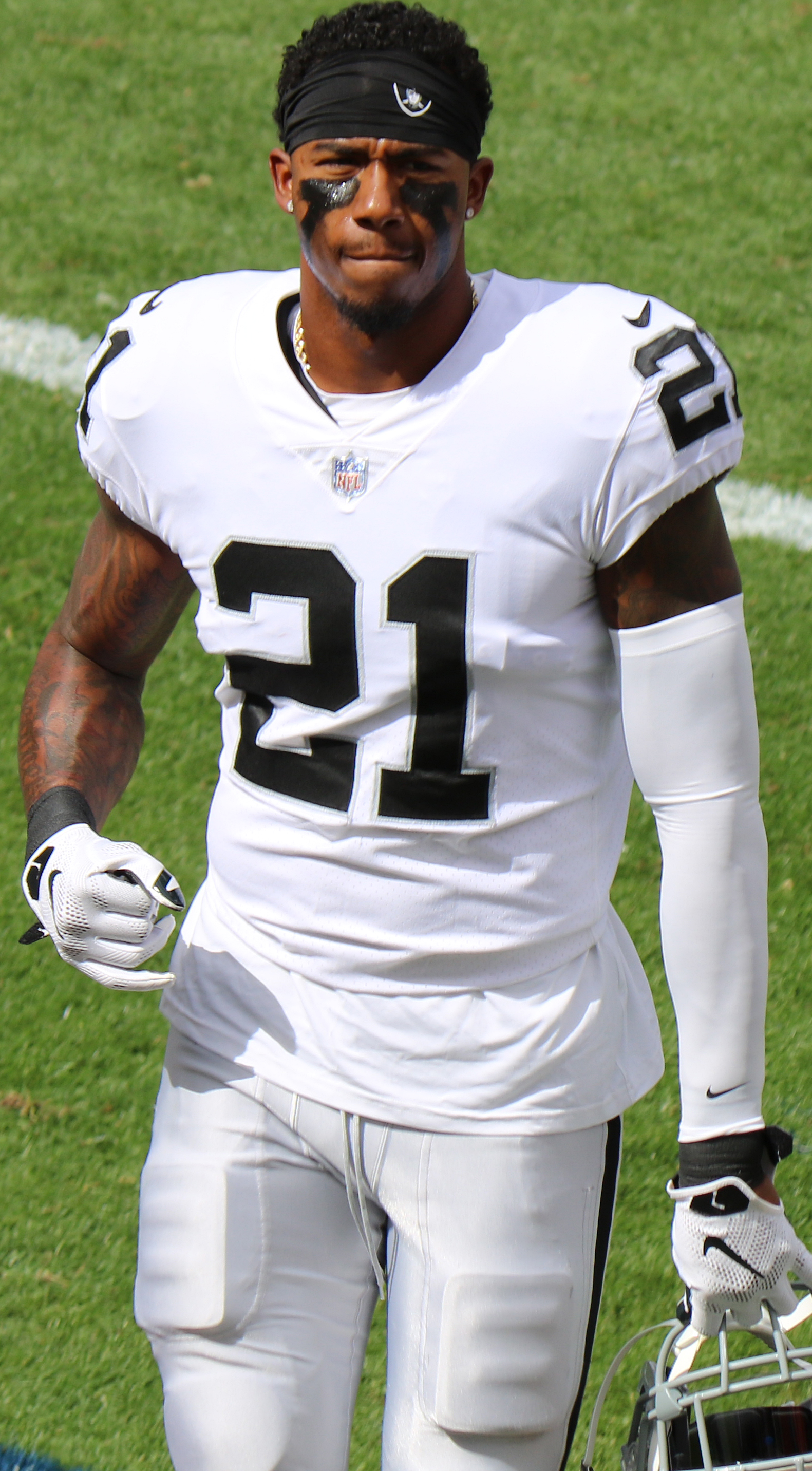
- Smith with the Oakland Raiders in 2017

No. 24, 27, 21
- Position: Cornerback

Personal information
- Born: July 14, 1987 (age 39); Pasadena, California, U.S.
- Listed height: 6 ft 3 in (1.91 m)
- Listed weight: 220 lb (100 kg)

Career information
- High school: Blair (Pasadena)
- College: Utah (2005–2008)
- NFL draft: 2009: 2nd round, 61st overall pick

Career history
- Miami Dolphins (2009–2012); Kansas City Chiefs (2013–2015); Oakland Raiders (2016–2017)

Awards and highlights
- First-team All-MW (2008)

Career NFL statistics
- Total tackles: 427
- Forced fumbles: 3
- Fumble recoveries: 1
- Pass deflections: 95
- Interceptions: 14
- Defensive touchdowns: 1
- Stats at Pro Football Reference

Sean Lee Smith (born July 14, 1987) is an American former professional football player who was a cornerback in the National Football League (NFL). He played college football for the Utah Utes and was selected by the Miami Dolphins in the second round of the 2009 NFL draft. He also played for the Kansas City Chiefs and Oakland Raiders.

== Early life ==
Smith attended Blair High School in Pasadena, California, where he played football, basketball, and ran track. In football, he gained All-Conference, All-State, and All-American honors as a senior after rushing for over 1,500 yards with 18 touchdowns, helping lead Blair High School to its best record in 10 years. He also had 547 receiving yards and over 400 yards in kickoff returns. In track & field, Smith competed in sprints. At the 2005 CIF-SS Division IV, he qualified for the state finals in the 100-meter dash (11.36 s) and the 200-meter dash (22.48 s), placing 13th and 7th respectively in the finals. In addition, he also ran a leg on the Blair 4 × 100 m relay squad.

== College career ==
Smith was redshirted for the 2005 season. During 2006, his redshirt freshman year, he played as a wide receiver for the first eleven games before moving to cornerback, he played in all 13 games ending with seven rushes for 63 yards (9.0 average) and one reception for 12 yards.

In 2007, he started in ten games for the Utes, nine at cornerback. He had four interceptions, which was the best for a single player in the Mountain West that year, and tied the Utah single-game record with four pass breakups against the New Mexico Lobos toward the end of the 2007 season.

In 2008, Smith started in all but one game for the Utes, finishing First-Team All-Mountain West defensive back. His five interceptions on the season were the most on the team and tied for first in the conference. Smith's best performance, though, may have come in the 2009 Sugar Bowl, where he had six tackles, a sack, a forced fumble and a huge pass breakup in Utah's stunning 31-17 victory over the Alabama Crimson Tide.

Smith decided to forgo his senior year to enter the 2009 NFL draft.

== Professional career ==
=== Pre-draft ===
Smith entered the 2009 NFL Draft as a highly ranked cornerback prospect. He fell into the 99th percentile among cornerbacks for height and was among the 98th percentile in weight.

Pre-draft measurables
Height	Weight	Arm length	Hand span	40-yard dash	10-yard split	20-yard split	20-yard shuttle	Three-cone drill	Vertical jump	Broad jump	Bench press
6 ft 3 1/2 in (1.92 m)	214 lb (97 kg)	34 5/8 in (0.88 m)	9 7/8 in (0.25 m)	4.47 s	1.51 s	2.59 s	4.15 s	6.92 s	34.0 in (0.86 m)	9 ft 11 in (3.02 m)	10 reps
All values from NFL Combine/Pro Day

=== Miami Dolphins ===
==== 2009 ====
The Miami Dolphins selected Smith in the second round (61st overall) of the 2009 NFL draft. Smith was the sixth overall cornerback drafted and was the second cornerback selected by the Miami Dolphins in 2009.

On July 24, 2009, the Dolphins signed Smith to a four-year, $3.16 million contract that includes a signing bonus of $945,000.

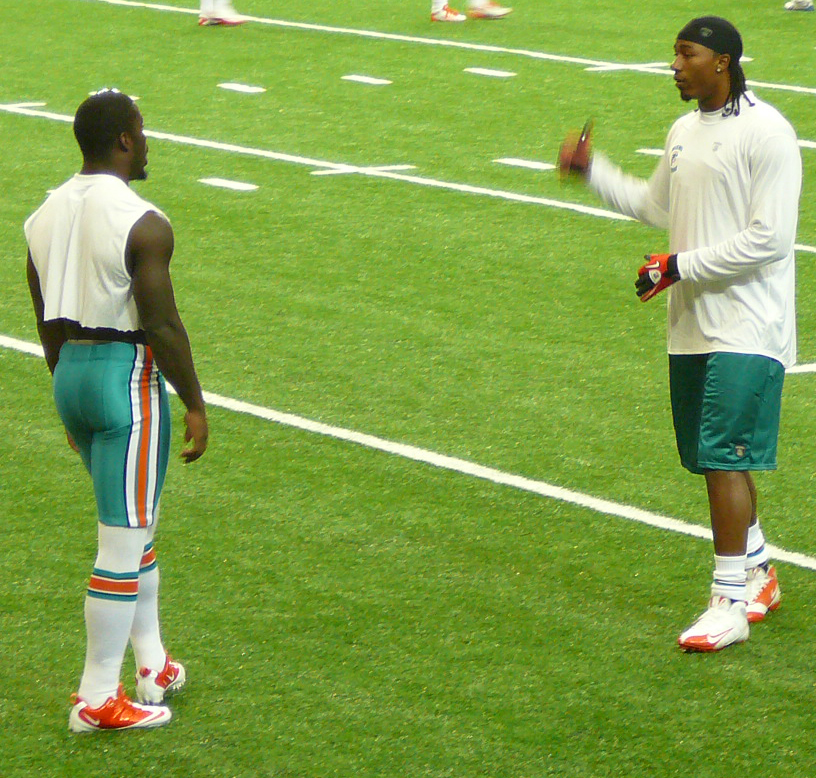
Smith (right) with fellow Dolphins' starting cornerback Vontae Davis in 2011.

Throughout training camp, Smith competed to be a starting cornerback against veterans Jason Allen, Eric Green, and rookie first round pick Vontae Davis. Head coach Tony Sparano officially named Smith a starting cornerback to start the regular season, along with Will Allen.

He made his professional regular season debut in the Miami Dolphins' season-high-opener at the Atlanta Falcons and recorded two solo tackles and deflected two passes in their 19–7 loss. He made his first career tackle on running back Jerious Norwood during a two-yard gain in the first quarter. On November 1, 2009, Smith collected a season-high six solo tackles and a pass deflection in a 30–25 victory at the New York Jets in Week 8. The following week, he tied his season-high of six solo tackles during a 27–17 loss at the New England Patriots in Week 7. He completed his rookie season with 39 combined tackles (32 solo) and 12 pass deflections in 16 games and 16 starts. He earned an overall grade of 77.7 from Pro Football Focus and ranked 34th among all qualifying cornerbacks in 2009.

==== 2010 ====
Smith and Vontae Davis entered training camp slated as the starting cornerbacks but also received competition from Will Allen and Jason Allen. On September 6, 2010, head coach Tony Sparano surprised many analysts and fans when he announced Jason Allen would replace Sean Smith as the starting cornerback for the season-opener. He was demoted after struggling against wide receivers Roddy White and Sam Hurd during the preseason and was a healthy scratch for the Dolphins' 15–10 victory at the Buffalo Bills in the season-opener. On October 31, 2010, Smith recorded a tackle, deflected two passes, and made his first career interception in the Dolphins' 22–14 victory at the Cincinnati Bengals in Week 8. He intercepted a pass attempt by quarterback Carson Palmer, that was intended for wide receiver Terrell Owens, and returned it for an 18-yard gain before being tackled by Andre Caldwell. His performance earned him back his job as a starting cornerback as he replaced Jason Allen who was subsequently waived on November 10, 2010. In Week 10, Smith collected a season-high six combined tackles during a 29–17 victory against the Tennessee Titans. He finished the season with 51 combined tackles (43 solo), nine passes defended, and an interception in 15 games and eight starts. Smith received an overall grade of 82.9 from Pro Football Focus and ranked 19th among all qualifying cornerbacks in 2010.

==== 2011 ====
Defensive coordinator Mike Nolan retained Smith and Vontae Davis as the starting cornerback duo to start the 2011 season. On October 23, 2011, Smith collected a season-high seven solo tackles in an 18–15 loss to the Denver Broncos in Week 7. The following week, he made a season-high tying seven solo tackles and deflected a pass during a 20–17 loss at the New York Giants in Week 8. On December 12, 2011, the Miami Dolphins fired head coach Tony Sparano after they fell to a 4-9 record. Assistant head coach/secondary coach Todd Bowles was named the interim head coach for the remainder of the season. He finished the 2011 season with a career-high 62 combined tackles (52 solo), seven pass deflections, and two interceptions in 16 games and 16 starts. He received an overall grade of 43.4 which was the lowest grade of his career from Pro Football Focus. His grade ranked 93rd among all qualifying cornerbacks in 2011.

==== 2012 ====
The Dolphins' new head coach Joe Philbin named Smith the No. 1 cornerback on the depth chart to start the regular season, alongside Richard Marshall. On September 30, 2012, Smith recorded six solo tackles, a season-high four pass deflections, and intercepted two pass attempts by quarterback Kevin Kolb in the Dolphins' 24–21 overtime loss at the Arizona Cardinals in Week 4. This game marked Smith's first career game with multiple interceptions. The following week, he collected a season-high eight combined tackles (six solo) and a pass deflection during a 17–13 victory at the Cincinnati Bengals in Week 5. Smith finished the 2012 season with 59 combined tackles (52 solo), 12 passes defensed, and two interceptions in 16 games and 16 starts. He received an overall grade of 68.3 from Pro Football Focus and ranked 66th among all qualifying cornerbacks in 2012.

Smith became an unrestricted free agent in 2013 and was reportedly seeking $8–$10 million per year. Smith and Dominique Rodgers-Cromartie were considered to be the top cornerbacks on the depth chart. As a top free agent, he received interest from multiple teams, including the Kansas City Chiefs, Philadelphia Eagles, Tampa Bay Buccaneers, New England Patriots, and the Arizona Cardinals.

=== Kansas City Chiefs ===
==== 2013 ====
On March 14, 2013, the Kansas City Chiefs signed Smith to a three-year, $18 million contract that includes $11 million guaranteed and a signing bonus of $6.75 million.

Smith competed for a starting job against Dunta Robinson, who was also signed as a free agent. Head coach Andy Reid named Smith a starting cornerback to begin the regular season, opposite Brandon Flowers.

In Week 6, Smith collected a season-high five solo tackles and a pass deflection during a 24–7 victory against the Oakland Raiders. On November 3, 2013, he made two combined tackles, two pass deflections, an interception, and scored his first career touchdown in the Chiefs' 23–13 win at the Buffalo Bills in Week 9. Smith returned an interception by quarterback Jeff Tuel, that was intended for wide receiver T. J. Graham, for a 100-yard touchdown. The touchdown became Smith's first career pick six. In Week 13, he recorded a season-high tying five solo tackles during a 35–28 loss to the Denver Broncos. He completed the 2013 season with 47 combined tackles (43 solo), 13 pass deflections, two interceptions, and a touchdown in 16 games and 16 starts. Pro Football Focus gave Smith an overall grade of 76.7, which ranked 44th among all qualifying cornerbacks in 2013.

The Kansas City Chiefs finished second in the AFC West with an 11–5 record and earned a wildcard berth. On January 4, 2014, Smith started in his first career playoff game and recorded four combined tackles and a pass deflection in the a Chiefs' 45–44 loss at the Indianapolis Colts in the AFC Wildcard Game.

==== 2014 ====
Head coach Andy Reid demoted Smith after he was arrested for a DUI in June (see Legal troubles). He competed against Marcus Cooper, Ron Parker, and Chris Owens during training camp. Smith was named a starting cornerback, along with Marcus Cooper, to start the regular season. On September 29, 2014, Smith made a season-high two pass deflections, three solo tackles, and an interception during a 41–14 victory against the New England Patriots in Week 4. The following week, he collected a season-high six solo tackles and two pass deflections in the Chiefs' 22–17 loss at the Kansas City Chiefs in Week 5. He finished the season with 50 combined tackles (47 solo), a career-high 16 passes defended, and an interception in 16 games and 16 starts.

==== 2015 ====
On July 24, 2015, the NFL announced that Smith would be suspended for the first three games of the 2015 season after pleading guilty to a DUI charge earlier in April. Defensive coordinator Bob Sutton named Smith and rookie first round pick Marcus Peters the starting cornerbacks with Phillip Gaines replacing Smith for the first three games.

On November 1, 2015, Smith collected a season-high five solo tackles and a season-high three pass deflections during a 45–10 victory against the Detroit Lions in Week 5. In Week 17, he recorded a season-high six combined tackles in the Chiefs' 23–17 win against the Oakland Raiders. Smith completed the season in 2013 with 45 combined tackles (40 solo), 12 pass deflections, and two interceptions in 13 games and 13 starts.

The Kansas City Chiefs finished the season second in the AFC West with an 11–5 record. On January 9, 2016, Smith started in the AFC Wildcard Game and recorded six solo tackles, two pass deflections, and intercepted a pass by Brian Hoyer as the Chiefs routed the Houston Texans 30–0. The following week, he made four combined tackles in a 27–20 loss at the New England Patriots in the AFC Divisional Round.

Smith became an unrestricted free agent for the second time in his career after the 2015 season and drew interest from multiple teams after the New York Giants signed top free agent cornerback Janoris Jenkins. It was reported he received major interest from the Oakland Raiders, San Francisco 49ers, and Los Angeles Rams.

=== Oakland Raiders ===
==== 2016 ====
On March 10, 2016, the Oakland Raiders signed Smith to a four-year, $40 million contract that includes $20 million guaranteed and a signing bonus of $5 million. The contract included an option for the Raiders to opt-out of the agreement after the 2017 season.

Head coach Jack Del Rio named Smith and David Amerson the starting cornerback duo to begin the 2016 season. In Week 2, Smith collected a season-high five solo tackles during a 35–28 loss against the Atlanta Falcons. The following week, he made three combined tackles, a pass deflection, and made his first interception as a part of the Raiders off a pass by quarterback Marcus Mariota in a 17–10 victory at the Tennessee Titans in Week 3. He was inactive for the Raiders' Week 9 victory against the Denver Broncos after injuring his shoulder the previous week. He finished the season with 40 combined tackles (33 solo), 11 passes defensed, and two interceptions in 15 games and 15 starts.

==== 2017 ====
Defensive coordinator Ken Norton Jr. retained Smith and Amerson as the starting cornerbacks to start the season, ahead of T. J. Carrie and Gareon Conley. Smith was inactive for the Raiders' Week 2 victory against the New York Jets due to a shoulder injury. Head coach Jack Del Rio benched him in favor of rookie Gareon Conley after a poor performance against the Baltimore Ravens in Week 5. He was a healthy scratch for their Week 6 loss to the Los Angeles Chargers the following week. On December 17, 2017, Smith recorded three solo tackles, two pass deflections, and intercepted two pass attempts by quarterback Dak Prescott during a 20–17 loss to the Dallas Cowboys in Week 15. In Week 17, he collected a season-high six solo tackles in the Raiders' 30–10 loss at the Los Angeles Chargers. Smith finished the 2017 season with 34 combined tackles (32 solo), four pass deflections, and two interceptions in 14 games and 14 starts.

On March 12, 2018, the Raiders released Smith, forgoing the last two-years on his contract. The Raiders released him prior to his guilty plea of felony assault.

Smith was suspended for the remainder of the 2018 season by the NFL on November 28, 2018. He was reinstated from suspension on March 19, 2019.

== NFL career statistics ==
Year	Team	GP	Tackles				Fumbles			Interceptions					
Year	Team	GP	Cmb	Solo	Ast	Sck	FF	FR	Yds	Int	Yds	Avg	Lng	TD	PD
2009	MIA	16	38	31	7	0.0	0	1	0	0	0	0.0	0	0	12
2010	MIA	15	51	43	8	0.0	0	0	0	1	18	18.0	18	0	9
2011	MIA	16	62	52	10	0.0	0	0	0	2	7	3.5	7	0	7
2012	MIA	16	59	53	6	0.0	3	0	0	2	31	15.5	31	0	12
2013	KC	16	47	43	4	0.0	0	0	0	2	96	48.0	100	1	15
2014	KC	16	50	47	3	0.0	0	0	0	1	34	34.0	34	0	18
2015	KC	13	45	40	5	0.0	0	0	0	2	5	2.5	5	0	12
2016	OAK	15	40	33	7	0.0	0	0	0	2	27	13.5	27	0	11
2017	OAK	14	34	32	2	0.0	0	0	0	2	9	4.5	9	0	4
Total		137	427	375	52	0.0	3	1	0	14	226	16.1	100	1	96

== Legal troubles ==
On June 10, 2014, Smith was arrested in Kansas City, Missouri after hitting a light pole with his car. Smith was cited for operating a vehicle with .08 percent or more of alcohol in his blood, driving a vehicle in a careless manner, and failing to present proof of insurance. Smith pleaded guilty to the DUI charge on April 15, 2015, and was sentenced to two years of probation, as well as, fined $895 after failing to present proof of insurance.

On August 17, 2017, Smith was charged with felony assault for his alleged involvement in a July incident in Pasadena, California. Smith allegedly beat then stomped on a male victim's head near the corner of Arroyo Parkway and Colorado Boulevard early in the morning on July 4, 2017. On March 13, 2018, Smith was sentenced to one year in jail and five years probation after pleading guilty to the assault.

During the July incident, Smith attacked Christopher Woods when he was out with Smith's sister Rayna, whom Woods had been dating for about 2 years. Woods sued Smith, claiming that the attack fractured his head in 5 different places causing him brain damage. Woods claimed he suffered from hematomas to the left and right side of his head, and required a metal plate and screws to repair facial fractures.

Smith was released from prison on August 14, 2018.
