= Dino Vasso =

American football coach (born 1987)

Houston Texans
- Title: Defensive backs coach

Personal information
- Born: November 8, 1987 (age 38); Philadelphia, Pennsylvania, U.S.
- Listed height: 5 ft 9 in (1.75 m)
- Listed weight: 178 lb (81 kg)

Career information
- Position: Cornerback (No. 9)
- High school: Ridley (PA)
- College: New Hampshire

Career history
- Temple (2011) Offensive intern; Missouri (2012) Defensive graduate assistant; Kansas City Chiefs (2013–2015) Coaching assistant; Philadelphia Eagles (2016–2020); Defensive quality control/assistant secondary coach (2016–2019); Assistant coordinator/defense (2020); Houston Texans (2021–present); Cornerbacks coach (2021–2023); Defensive backs coach (2024–present)

Awards and highlights
- Super Bowl champion (LII)

Martin Dino Vasso (born November 8, 1987) is an American professional football coach and former player who is the defensive backs coach for the Houston Texans of the National Football League (NFL). He was previously the assistant coordinator for defense for the Philadelphia Eagles, where he also won a Super Bowl as an assistant secondary coach. He has also been a coaching assistant for the Kansas City Chiefs as well as an intern and graduate assistant at Temple and Missouri

== Early life ==
Dino was a three-sport athlete who played football, and track at Ridley High School. After graduating, he committed to the University of New Hampshire. He played cornerback for four years from 2006 to 2010.

Pre-draft measurables
Height	Weight
5 ft 9 1/8 in (1.76 m)	178 lb (81 kg)
Values from Pro Day

== Coaching career ==
Vasso began his coaching career at Temple as an offensive intern in 2011, and was hired as a defensive graduate assistant the next season at Missouri with the task of handling recruiting videos and compiling information on recruits. He was later hired as a coaching assistant with the Kansas City Chiefs in 2013 where he spent three seasons working with the Chiefs defense.

=== Philadelphia Eagles ===
Vasso joined the Philadelphia Eagles coaching staff as a defensive quality control and assistant secondary coach under first-year head coach Doug Pederson, who he worked with in Kansas City. He won his Super Bowl with the Eagles when they defeated the New England Patriots in Super Bowl LII 41–33. Vasso was promoted to the role of assistant coordinator/defense in 2020 in a series of Eagles coaching staff shuffles.

=== Houston Texans ===
Vasso was hired as the cornerbacks coach for the Houston Texans on March 10, 2021. His promotion to defensive backs coach was announced on March 6, 2024.
