= Anthony Fasano =

American football player (born 1984)

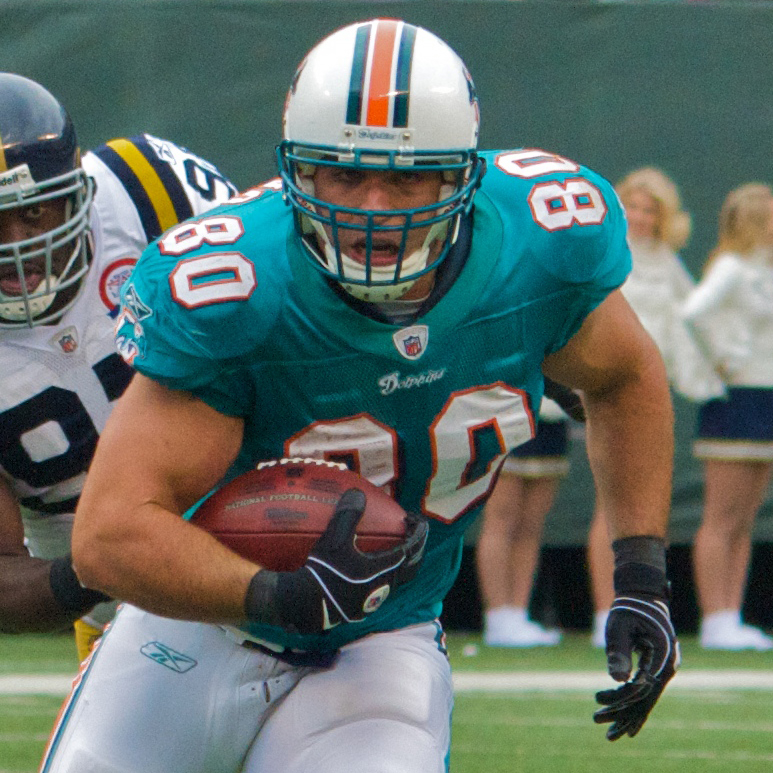
- Fasano with the Miami Dolphins in 2009

No. 80
- Position: Tight end

Personal information
- Born: April 20, 1984 (age 42); Verona, New Jersey, U.S.
- Listed height: 6 ft 4 in (1.93 m)
- Listed weight: 258 lb (117 kg)

Career information
- High school: Verona (NJ)
- College: Notre Dame (2002–2005)
- NFL draft: 2006: 2nd round, 53rd overall pick

Career history
- Dallas Cowboys (2006–2007); Miami Dolphins (2008–2012); Kansas City Chiefs (2013–2014); Tennessee Titans (2015–2016); Miami Dolphins (2017)

Career NFL statistics
- Games played: 180
- Receptions: 299
- Receiving yards: 3,278
- Receiving touchdowns: 36
- Stats at Pro Football Reference

Anthony Joseph Fasano (born April 20, 1984) is an American former professional football player who was a tight end in the National Football League (NFL). He was selected by the Dallas Cowboys in the second round of the 2006 NFL draft. He played college football for the Notre Dame Fighting Irish. Fasano also played for the Kansas City Chiefs, Tennessee Titans, and Miami Dolphins.

== Early life ==
Fasano attended and played high school football at Verona High School in Verona, New Jersey, where he was a four-year letterman as a tight end and defensive lineman. During his senior season in 2001, he caught 178 passes for 3,460 yards and 47 touchdowns as a tight end while also adding 219 solo tackles as a senior. He set both season and career touchdown receptions records for the county (47 and 182, respectively). He also set school records in receptions in a season and career, touchdowns in a season and solo tackles in a season. Fasano finished his career with 668 catches and more than 8,500 yards and played in the U.S. Army All-American Bowl.

Fasano also earned eight letters in other sports, including four in basketball, two in baseball, and two in track. During his first baseball outing as a freshman, he pitched a perfect game. He was a two-time all-league selection in baseball, and a two-time captain in basketball.

He was a two-time All-state and three-time All-conference selection in track, where he won the New Jersey Group 1 state championship in the javelin throw in his first year competing in the event, with a throw of 234 ft 1 in (71.36 m). He also threw the shot put. He also holds the record for the longest home run hit in a regular season game in Verona High School history.

Fasano was raised as a Roman Catholic. He is of Italian heritage and speaks Spanish and Italian fluently.

== College career ==
As a freshman at the University of Notre Dame in 2002, Fasano failed to see playing time. The following season, he appeared in 11 games while starting three. He finished the season with 18 receptions for 169 yards and two touchdowns. Fasano caught four passes for 33 yards, including first career touchdown on a two-yard pass from Brady Quinn, against USC.

In 2004, Fasano started nine of the 11 games in which he appeared for the Fighting Irish. In a game against Purdue, Fasano earned John Mackey National Tight End of the Week honors after catching eight passes for 155 yards (a school record). In a game against Washington, Fasano caught the pass from quarterback Brady Quinn in the famous "Pass right" play. He went on to catch two touchdown passes that game. Fasano finished the season with 27 receptions for 367 yard and four touchdowns.

During his 2005 senior season, Fasano caught 47 passes for 576 yards (both third on the team) and two touchdowns. His touchdown catches on the season came against Navy and Tennessee, both on passes from Brady Quinn. He was one of three finalists for the John Mackey Award, given annually to the nation's top tight end.

Fasano finished his collegiate career with 92 catches for 1,112 yards and eight touchdowns. He left Notre Dame ranking second all-time in receptions and receiving yards by a tight end.

== Professional career ==
=== Pre-draft ===
Pre-draft measurables
Height	Weight	Arm length	Hand span	40-yard dash	20-yard shuttle	Three-cone drill	Vertical jump	Broad jump	Bench press
6 ft 4 1/8 in (1.93 m)	259 lb (117 kg)	32 5/8 in (0.83 m)	9 1/2 in (0.24 m)	4.72, 4.71 s	4.34 s	6.94 s	33.5 in (0.85 m)	9 ft 4 in (2.84 m)	19 reps
All values from NFL Combine/Notre Dame's Pro Day

Fasano did not run the 40-yard dash at the NFL Scouting Combine in February 2006 due to an injured hamstring. However, at Notre Dame's Pro Day in March, Fasano posted 40-yard dash times of 4.74 and 4.71 seconds.

Prior to the 2006 NFL draft, Fasano visited with the Dallas Cowboys, New York Jets, Tampa Bay Buccaneers, and Washington Redskins.

=== Dallas Cowboys ===
==== 2006 season ====
Despite the presence of All-Pro tight end Jason Witten, the Dallas Cowboys selected Fasano in the second round (53rd overall) of the 2006 NFL draft, with the intent of running more two-tight end sets. It was reported that Fasano reminded then-head coach Bill Parcells of former NFL tight end Mark Bavaro, who played under Parcells with the New York Giants. Fasano agreed to terms on a contract with the Cowboys on July 27.

Fasano appeared in all 16 games while starting in five of them during his rookie year. He became the third rookie tight end in franchise history to start the season opener when he opened the game against the Jacksonville Jaguars on September 10. Fasano finished the season with 14 catches for 126 yards, and was also part of a blocking unit that helped running back Julius Jones rush for over 1,000 yards.

==== 2007 season ====
A shoulder injury bothered Fasano throughout training camp and preseason in 2007, but he went on to appear in every one of the team's regular season games while starting six of them. Fasano caught his first NFL touchdown on a 26-yard pass from quarterback Tony Romo against the Green Bay Packers on November 29. He suffered a mild concussion during Week 15 but did not miss a game. Fasano finished his second professional season with 14 receptions for 143 yards and a touchdown.

During the 2007 season, Wade Phillips became the new Cowboys head coach and Jason Garrett was named the offensive coordinator. At the end of the year, the team decided that he was not a good fit for their offensive system. He underwent shoulder surgery in January 2008.

=== Miami Dolphins (first stint) ===
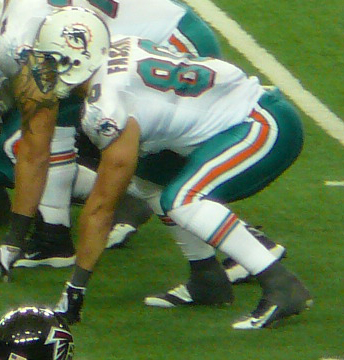
Fasano in 2009

==== 2008 season ====
On April 25, 2008, the Miami Dolphins agreed to acquire Fasano, along with linebacker Akin Ayodele, from the Cowboys in exchange for a fourth-round pick (100th overall) in the 2008 NFL draft. Dolphins executive vice president Bill Parcells, general manager Jeff Ireland, head coach Tony Sparano, and other assistants were with the Cowboys organization when Fasano was selected in 2006. The pick sent to Dallas for Fasano was eventually traded to the Oakland Raiders, who used it to select cornerback Tyvon Branch.

During his first season with the Dolphins, Fasano caught 34 passes for 454 yards and a career-high seven touchdowns.

==== 2009 season ====
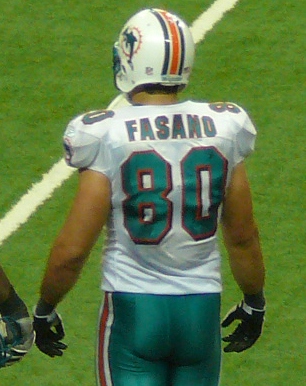
Fasano in 2009

In 2009, Fasano recorded 339 yards for two touchdowns as the Dolphins finished with a 7–9 record.

==== 2010 season ====
During training camp in August, Fasano switched from #81 to #80 after fellow tight end Aaron Halterman, who had previously worn #80, was waived/injured. On November 16, 2010, he signed a contract extension for two years worth up to $7.75 million. Overall, Fasano finished the 2010 season with a career-high 528 yards and 4 touchdowns as the Dolphins finished with a 7–9 record for the second consecutive year.

==== 2011 season ====
In 2011, Fasano recorded 32 receptions 451 yards for 5 touchdowns as the Dolphins finished with a 6–10 record.

==== 2012 season ====
In 2012, Fasano recorded a career-high 41 receptions for 332 yards and 5 touchdowns as the Dolphins finished with a 7–9 record.

=== Kansas City Chiefs ===
==== 2013 season ====
Fasano signed as a free agent with the Kansas City Chiefs on March 12, 2013. A very durable player, that year he played in only nine games due to different injuries (knee, ankle, and concussion), registering 23 receptions for 200 yards and 3 touchdowns.

==== 2014 season ====
Fasano had a good start to the 2014 season, but a knee contusion limited his play after week 10 and although he remained the starter, he was phased out of the offense in favor of Travis Kelce. Fasano finished the 2014 season recording 226 yards and 4 touchdowns. He was released in a salary cap move on February 26, 2015. In an episode of his podcast New Heights, Kelce credits Fasano as a mentor who modeled the professionalism and weekly routine needed to succeed in the league.

=== Tennessee Titans ===
After his release from the Chiefs, on March 13, 2015, Fasano signed a two-year contract with the Tennessee Titans. In his first year with the Titans, Fasano recorded 289 yards and two touchdowns, which included the game-winner in overtime against the New Orleans Saints.

In 2016, Fasano recorded 8 receptions for 83 yards for 2 touchdowns as the Titans finished with a 9–7 record and narrowly missed the playoffs.

=== Miami Dolphins (second stint) ===
On March 9, 2017, Fasano signed a one-year contract with the Dolphins. He finished the season with 12 receptions for 107 yards and a touchdown.

== NFL career statistics ==
=== Regular season ===
Year	Team	Games		Receiving					Fumbles	
Year	Team	GP	GS	Rec	Yds	Avg	Lng	TD	Fum	Lost
2006	DAL	16	5	14	126	9.0	22	0	0	0
2007	DAL	16	5	14	143	10.2	26	1	0	0
2008	MIA	16	16	34	454	13.4	24	7	0	0
2009	MIA	14	14	31	339	10.9	27	2	0	0
2010	MIA	15	15	39	528	11.4	31	4	0	0
2011	MIA	15	15	32	451	14.1	35	5	0	0
2012	MIA	16	16	41	332	8.1	22	5	0	0
2013	KC	9	9	23	200	8.7	20	3	0	0
2014	KC	15	13	25	226	9.0	22	4	0	0
2015	TEN	16	11	26	289	11.1	33	2	0	0
2016	TEN	16	10	8	83	10.4	17	2	0	0
2017	MIA	16	6	12	107	8.9	29	1	0	0
Career		180	135	299	3,278	11.0	35	36	0	0

=== Postseason ===
Season	Team	Games		Receiving					Fumbles	
Season	Team	GP	GS	Rec	Yds	Avg	Lng	TD	Fum	Lost
2006	DAL	1	0	0	0	0.0	0	0	1	0
2007	DAL	1	1	1	5	5.0	5	0	0	0
2008	MIA	1	1	0	0	0.0	0	0	0	0
2013	KC	1	1	2	6	3.0	5	0	0	0
Career		4	3	3	11	3.7	5	0	0	0
