= Sanders Commings =

American football and baseball player (born 1990)

No. 26
- Position: Cornerback

Personal information
- Born: March 8, 1990 (age 36); Augusta, Georgia, U.S.
- Listed height: 6 ft 0 in (1.83 m)
- Listed weight: 223 lb (101 kg)

Career information
- High school: Westside (Augusta)
- College: Georgia (2008–2012)
- NFL draft: 2013: 5th round, 134th overall pick

Career history
- Kansas City Chiefs (2013–2015)

Career NFL statistics
- Total tackles: 1
- Stats at Pro Football Reference

Sanders Commings (born March 8, 1990) is an American former professional football player who was a cornerback in the National Football League (NFL). He played college football for the Georgia Bulldogs and was selected by the Kansas City Chiefs in the fifth round of the 2013 NFL draft. He later had a short professional baseball career.

== Early life ==
Commings was born in Augusta, Georgia. He attended Westside High School in Augusta, and played high school football for the Westside Patriots. As a junior in 2006, he recorded seven interceptions. As a senior in 2007, he missed five games with a cracked fibula but still tallied three interceptions, 41 tackles, 109 rushing yards, 248 receiving yards, and four receiving touchdowns. He also played baseball, where as a senior, he batted .520 with 15 home runs, 40 runs batted in and 18 stolen bases and was a 37th round draft pick of the Arizona Diamondbacks in the 2008 MLB draft.

== College career ==
While attending the University of Georgia, Commings played for coach Mark Richt's Georgia Bulldogs football team between 2008 and 2012. During his college career, he appeared in 58 games, starting 34 of them, and accumulated 154 tackles (113 solo), six tackles for loss, 17 pass break-ups, and eight interceptions.

== Professional career ==
Pre-draft measurables
Height	Weight	Arm length	Hand span	Wingspan	40-yard dash	10-yard split	20-yard split	20-yard shuttle	Three-cone drill	Vertical jump	Broad jump	Bench press
6 ft 0 1/8 in (1.83 m)	216 lb (98 kg)	32 in (0.81 m)	8 7/8 in (0.23 m)	6 ft 4 3/4 in (1.95 m)	4.41 s	1.59 s	2.60 s	4.30 s	7.10 s	34.5 in (0.88 m)	9 ft 9 in (2.97 m)	23 reps
All values from NFL Combine/Pro Day

Commings was selected by the Kansas City Chiefs in the fifth round, 134th overall pick, of the 2013 NFL draft.

On July 23, 2013, Commings fractured his left collarbone during training camp practice and was expected to be sidelined anywhere from two to six weeks. On July 30, 2014, he broke his ankle during training camp, which required surgery. On September 5, 2015, Commings was waived by the Chiefs with an injury settlement.

== Baseball career ==
Sanders Commings
- Outfielder
- Born: March 8, 1990 (age 36); Augusta, Georgia, U.S.
- Bats: Right Throws: Right

In 2017, Commings trained with Jerry Hairston Jr., in an attempt to return to baseball, a sport Commings had not played since high school.

In February, Commings signed a minor league deal with the Atlanta Braves. The deal came with a $100,000 signing bonus. After a brief stint with the Danville Braves of the Appalachian League, Commings was released on July 3.
