= 2014 Kansas City Chiefs season =

NFL team season

- Owner: The Hunt family (Clark Hunt Chairman and CEO)
- General manager: John Dorsey
- Head coach: Andy Reid
- Offensive coordinator: Doug Pederson
- Defensive coordinator: Bob Sutton
- Home stadium: Arrowhead Stadium

Results
- Record: 9–7
- Division place: 2nd AFC West
- Playoffs: Did not qualify
- All-Pros: 2: LB Justin Houston (1st team); FB Anthony Sherman (2nd team)
- Pro Bowlers: 4: RB Jamaal Charles; LB Tamba Hali; LB Justin Houston; DT Dontari Poe
- Team MVP: Justin Houston
- Team ROY: De'Anthony Thomas

Uniform
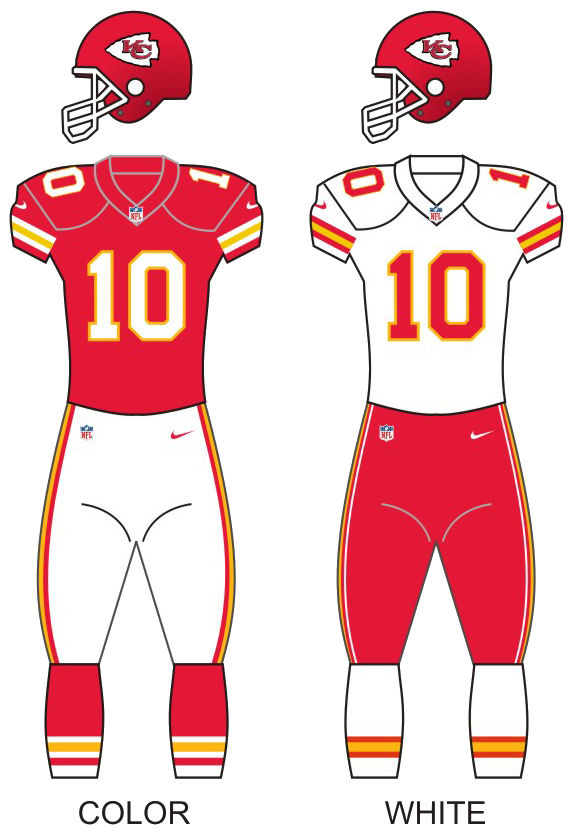

The 2014 season was the Kansas City Chiefs' 45th in the National Football League (NFL), their 55th overall and their second under the head coach/general manager tandem of Andy Reid and John Dorsey. The Chiefs broke the crowd noise record on Monday Night Football against the New England Patriots on September 29, 2014 with a crowd roar of 142.2 decibels. The Chiefs failed to match their 11–5 record from 2013, and missed the playoffs. However, they defeated both teams that would eventually meet in that season's Super Bowl: the New England Patriots and the Seattle Seahawks. The 2014 Kansas City Chiefs became the first NFL team since the 1964 New York Giants, and the only team in the 16 game season era, to complete an entire season with no touchdown passes to a wide receiver.

This was the last season the Chiefs failed to qualify for the playoffs until 2025.

== Roster changes ==
=== Offseason ===
==== Cuts ====
Player	Position	2014 team
Dunta Robinson	CB	None
Robert James	LB	None
Brandon Flowers	CB	San Diego Chargers

==== Reserve/future free agent contracts ====
Player	Position
Malcolm Bronson	DB
Jordan Campbell	LB
Weston Dressler	WR
Demetrius Harris	TE
Dominique Hamilton	NT
Frankie Hammond	WR
Alonzo Highsmith Jr.	LB
Jerrell Jackson	WR
Joe McKnight	RB
Jerron McMillian	S
Kevin Rutland	CB
DeMarcus Van Dyke	CB

==== Free agency ====
Offseason
Position	Player	Status^{*}	2013 team(s)	2014 team
S	Husain Abdullah	UFA	Kansas City Chiefs	Kansas City Chiefs
T	Branden Albert	UFA	Kansas City Chiefs	Miami Dolphins
G	Jon Asamoah	UFA	Kansas City Chiefs	Atlanta Falcons
DT	Jermelle Cudjo	UFA	St. Louis Rams	Kansas City Chiefs
S	Quintin Demps	UFA	Kansas City Chiefs	New York Giants
LS	Thomas Gafford	UFA	Kansas City Chiefs	Kansas City Chiefs
TE	Richard Gordon	RFA	Kansas City Chiefs	Tennessee Titans
WR	Mark Harrison	UFA	New England Patriots	Kansas City Chiefs
G	Ricky Henry	RFA	Kansas City Chiefs	Kansas City Chiefs
DE	Tyson Jackson	UFA	Kansas City Chiefs	Atlanta Falcons
CB	Brandon Jones	UFA	San Diego Chargers	Kansas City Chiefs
LB	Akeem Jordan	UFA	Kansas City Chiefs	Washington Redskins
S	Kendrick Lewis	UFA	Kansas City Chiefs	Houston Texans
DT	Kyle Love	UFA	Kansas City Chiefs; Jacksonville Jaguars	Kansas City Chiefs
T	Jeff Linkenbach	UFA	Indianapolis Colts	Kansas City Chiefs
LB	Joe Mays	UFA	Denver Broncos	Kansas City Chiefs
WR	Dexter McCluster	UFA	Kansas City Chiefs	Tennessee Titans
T	Ryan McKee	UFA	None	Kansas City Chiefs
CB	Chris Owens	UFA	Miami Dolphins	Kansas City Chiefs
NT	Jerrell Powe	RFA	Kansas City Chiefs	Houston Texans
CB	Justin Rogers	UFA	Buffalo Bills; Miami Dolphins; Houston Texans	Kansas City Chiefs
G	Geoff Schwartz	UFA	Kansas City Chiefs	New York Giants
DT	Vance Walker	UFA	Oakland Raiders	Kansas City Chiefs
T	J'Marcus Webb	UFA	Minnesota Vikings	Kansas City Chiefs
WR	Kyle Williams	UFA	Kansas City Chiefs	Kansas City Chiefs
LB	Frank Zombo	UFA	Kansas City Chiefs	Kansas City Chiefs
* RFA: Restricted free agent, UFA: Unrestricted free agent, ERFA: Exclusive rights free agent, Franchise: Franchise tag

==== Draft ====
2014 Kansas City Chiefs Draft
Round	Selection	Player	Position	College
1	23	Dee Ford	Defensive end	Auburn
3	87	Phillip Gaines	Cornerback	Rice
4	124	De'Anthony Thomas	Running back	Oregon
5	163	Aaron Murray	Quarterback	Georgia
6	193^{*}	Zach Fulton	Guard	Tennessee
6	200	Laurent Duvernay-Tardif	Tackle	McGill

Notes

- The Chiefs traded a conditional 2014 third-round selection along with their 2013 second-round selection to the San Francisco 49ers in exchange for quarterback Alex Smith; the 2014 selection was later upgraded to a second-rounder (No. 56 overall) after a condition was met in which the Chiefs won a minimum of eight games during the 2013 season.
- * Acquired via trade with the Dallas Cowboys. Dallas received linebacker Edgar Jones and the Chiefs' seventh-round selection (No. 238 overall).

==== Undrafted free agents ====
Position	Player	College
S	Daniel Sorensen	BYU
WR	Darryl Surgent	Louisiana-Lafayette
DB	David Van Dyke	Tennessee State
RB	Charcandrick West	Abilene Christian
LB	Ben Johnson	Northwestern
WR	Albert Wilson	Georgia State
DT	Kona Schwenke	Notre Dame
FB	James Baker	Idaho
C	Ben Gottschalk	SMU
K	Cairo Santos	Tulane
LB	DeRon Furr	Fort Valley State
WR	Deon Anthony	Troy

=== Preseason transactions ===
==== Trades ====
Position	Player/pick received	Team	Compensation
FS	Kelcie McCray	Tampa Bay Buccaneers	G Rishaw Johnson

==== Cuts ====
Position	Player
LB	Dezman Moses
G	Ben Gottschalk

==== Signings ====
Position	Player
LB	Devan Walker
S	Jonathon Amaya
G	Mike McGlynn

==== Preseason roster cut-downs ====
Cuts to 75
Position	Player
WR	Deon Anthony
NT	Jarius Campbell
NT	Jermelle Cudjo
WR	Weston Dressler
G	Otis Hudson
WR	Jerrell Jackson
CB	Brandon Jones
CB	Vernon Kearny
T	Ryan McKee
S	Jerron McMillian
CB	Kevin Rutland
TE	Adam Schiltz
CB	Damond Smith
WR	Darryl Surgent

Cuts to 53
Position	Player
S	Jonathon Amaya
S	Malcolm Bronson
FB	Jordan Campbell
DL	Dominique Hamilton
WR	Mark Harrison
G	Ricky Henry
LB	Alonzo Highsmith Jr.
LB	Nico Johnson
DT	Kyle Love
CB	Justin Rogers
DL	Kona Schwenke
K	Ryan Succop
CB	DeMarcus Van Dyke
LB	Devan Walker
T	J'Marcus Webb
RB	Charcandrick West
WR	Fred Williams

=== Regular season transactions ===
==== Suspensions served ====
Position	Player	Length	Reason	Weeks served
WR	Dwayne Bowe	1 game	Violation of personal conduct policy	1
T	Donald Stephenson	4 games	Performance enhancing drugs violation	1–4

Note: Rokevious Watkins was suspended by the NFL while on the Chiefs roster, but was released before serving his suspension

==== Cuts ====
Position	Player
WR	Kyle Williams

==== Signings ====
Position	Player	Previous team
FS	Kurt Coleman	Minnesota Vikings
DT	Kevin Vickerson	Denver Broncos
CB	Jamell Fleming	Baltimore Ravens
RB	Charcandrick West	Kansas City Chiefs*
TE	Phillip Supernaw	Baltimore Ravens
WR	Jason Avant	Carolina Panthers

*Indicates player was signed off the practice squad

==== Players involved in multiple transactions ====
This list is for players who were involved in more than one transaction during the season

Position	Player	Final status
DE	Damion Square	Claimed off waivers by San Diego
S	Daniel Sorensen	Chiefs active roster
LB	Jerry Franklin	New Orleans Saints active roster
TE	Richard Gordon	Chiefs active roster

== Eric Berry ==
After complaining of chest pains in a week 12 loss to the Oakland Raiders, safety Eric Berry received an X-ray. Doctors discovered a mass in his chest which was believed to be lymphoma. He was placed on the Non-football illness list, ending his season. Immediately following the reports coming out, many NFL players and teams issued wishes to Berry, including division rivals the Oakland Raiders, San Diego Chargers, and Denver Broncos. On December 7, prior to a game against the Arizona Cardinals, many Cardinals players, coaches, and front office staff, wore shirts sold through the Chiefs website that said "Be Bold, Be Brave, Be Berry" with his name and jersey number on the back. The Cardinals also donated $10,000 to Berry's charity, The Eric Berry Foundation. On December 8, Berry was confirmed to have Hodgkin's lymphoma. His doctor, Dr. Christopher Flowers, a lymphoma specialist at Emory University Hospital in Atlanta, said of Berry's diagnosis, "This is a diagnosis that is very treatable and potentially curable with standard chemotherapy approaches. The goal of Mr. Berry's treatment is to cure his lymphoma and we are beginning that treatment now." Following the confirmation, Berry released a statement saying "I am truly thankful for all of the support from family, friends, coaches, teammates and the entire Chiefs kingdom. At first I was in shock with the diagnosis on Saturday and did not even want to miss a game, but I understand that right now I have to concentrate on a new opponent. I have great confidence in the doctors and the plan they are going to put in place for me to win this fight. I believe that I am in God’s hands and I have great peace in that. I know my coaches and teammates will hold things down here the rest of the season and until I am back running out of the tunnel at Arrowhead. I am so thankful and appreciative of being a part of this franchise and playing in front of the best fans in the NFL. I will be back!"

== Staff ==
2014 Kansas City Chiefs staff
Front office: Chairman/CEO – Clark Hunt; President – Mark Donovan; Executive vice president of football operations – Andy Reid; General manager – John Dorsey; Director of football administration – Trip MacCracken; Director of scouting – Chris Ballard; Head coaches: Head coach – Andy Reid; Assistant head coach/wide receivers – David Culley; Senior assistant to the head coach – Joe D’Orazio; Offensive coaches: Offensive coordinator – Doug Pederson; Quarterbacks – Matt Nagy; Running backs – Eric Bieniemy; Tight ends – Tom Melvin; Offensive line – Andy Heck; Assistant offensive line – Eugene Chung; Quality control – Correy Matthaei; Special projects/spread game analysts – Brad Childress; Statistical analysis coordinator – Mike Frazier	Defensive coaches: Defensive coordinator – Bob Sutton; Defensive line – Tommy Brasher; Linebackers – Gary Gibbs; Defensive backs – Emmitt Thomas; Assistant secondary – Al Harris; Quality control – Mark DeLeone; Quality control – Britt Reid; Coaching assistant – Dino Vasso; Special teams coaches: Special teams – Dave Toub; Assistant special teams – Brock Olivo; Strength and conditioning: Head athletic trainer – Rick Burkholder; Strength and conditioning – Barry Rubin; Assistant strength and conditioning – Travis Crittenden; Assistant strength and conditioning – Brent Salazar

== Final roster ==
2014 Kansas City Chiefs roster
Quarterbacks (QB): 10 Chase Daniel; 7 Aaron Murray; 11 Alex Smith; Running backs (RB): 25 Jamaal Charles; 34 Knile Davis; 42 Anthony Sherman FB; 35 Charcandrick West; Wide receivers (WR): 81 Jason Avant; 17 Donnie Avery; 82 Dwayne Bowe; 85 Frankie Hammond; 88 Junior Hemingway; 13 De'Anthony Thomas; 12 Albert Wilson; Tight ends (TE): 80 Anthony Fasano; 89 Richard Gordon; 87 Travis Kelce	Offensive linemen (OL): 76 Laurent Duvernay-Tardif G; 72 Eric Fisher T; 73 Zach Fulton G; 68 Ryan Harris T; 61 Rodney Hudson C; 64 Eric Kush C; 74 Jeff Linkenbach G; 75 Mike McGlynn G; 79 Donald Stephenson T; Defensive linemen (DL): 97 Allen Bailey DE; 96 Jaye Howard DE; 92 Dontari Poe NT; 94 Kevin Vickerson DE; 99 Vance Walker DE; 98 Nick Williams DE	Linebackers (LB): 55 Dee Ford OLB; 91 Tamba Hali OLB; 50 Justin Houston OLB; 52 James-Michael Johnson ILB; 95 Josh Martin OLB; 90 Josh Mauga ILB; 53 Joe Mays ILB; 51 Frank Zombo OLB; Defensive backs (DB): 39 Husain Abdullah FS; 27 Kurt Coleman SS; 31 Marcus Cooper CB; 30 Jamell Fleming CB; 23 Phillip Gaines CB; 24 Kelcie McCray FS; 20 Chris Owens CB; 38 Ron Parker; 21 Sean Smith CB; 49 Daniel Sorensen SS; Special teams (ST): 2 Dustin Colquitt P; 43 Thomas Gafford LS; 5 Cairo Santos K	Practice squad: 44 Brandon Barden TE; 14 Armon Binns WR (IR); 59 JoJo Dickson LB; 93 Hebron Fangupo NT; 65 Ricky Henry G; 19 Corbin Louks WR; 40 Deji Olatoye CB; 60 Jarrod Pughsley G; 47 Adam Schiltz TE; 83 Fred Williams WR; 66 Jerel Worthy NT; Reserve: 71 Jeff Allen G (IR); 29 Eric Berry SS (NF-Ill.); 9 Tyler Bray QB (IR); 77 Mike Catapano DE (NF-Ill.); 26 Sanders Commings SS (IR); 70 Mike DeVito DE (IR); 32 Cyrus Gray RB (IR); 84 Demetrius Harris TE (IR); 15 A. J. Jenkins WR (IR); 56 Derrick Johnson ILB (IR); 22 Joe McKnight RB (IR); 54 Dezman Moses ILB; Rookies in italics 53 active, 13 reserve, 10 practice squad

== Preseason ==
=== Schedule ===
Week	Date	Opponent	Result	Record	Venue	Recap
1	August 7	Cincinnati Bengals	W 41–39	1–0	Arrowhead Stadium	Recap
2	August 17	at Carolina Panthers	L 16–28	1–1	Bank of America Stadium	Recap
3	August 23	Minnesota Vikings	L 12–30	1–2	Arrowhead Stadium	Recap
4	August 28	at Green Bay Packers	L 14–34	1–3	Lambeau Field	Recap

=== Game summaries ===
==== Week 1: vs. Cincinnati Bengals ====
Week 1: Cincinnati Bengals at Kansas City Chiefs – Game summary

Quarter	1	2	3	4	Total
Bengals	10	14	0	15	39
Chiefs	17	10	7	7	41

at Arrowhead Stadium, Kansas City, Missouri

- Date: August 7
- Game time: 7:30 p.m. CDT
- Game weather: Cloudy, 78 °F (26 °C)
- Game attendance: 70,951
- Referee: Clete Blakeman
- Recap, Game Book

Game information

First quarter

- CIN – Mike Nugent 30-yard field goal, 9:06. Bengals 3–0. Drive: 9 plays, 81 yards, 3:45.
- CIN – Brandon Tate 9-yard pass from Jason Campbell (Mike Nugent kick), 6:34. Bengals 10–0. Drive: 3 plays, 16 yards, 1:19.
- KC – Ryan Succop 27-yard field goal, 4:47. Bengals 10–3. Drive: 5 plays, 16 yards, 1:47.
- KC – De'Anthony Thomas 80-yard punt return (Cairo Santos kick), 0:38. Tied 10–10.
- KC – Sean Smith 36-yard interception return (Ryan Succop kick), 0:22. Chiefs 17–10.

Second quarter

- CIN – Dre Kirkpatrick 40-yard interception return (Mike Nugent kick), 12:10. Tied 17–17.
- KC – Cairo Santos 28-yard field goal, 6:07. Chiefs 20–17. Drive: 9 plays, 62 yards, 6:03.
- CIN – Dane Sanzenbacher 26-yard pass from Jason Campbell (Mike Nugent kick), 1:51. Bengals 24–20. Drive: 9 plays, 81 yards, 4:26.
- KC – Travis Kelce 69-yard pass from Chase Daniel (Ryan Succop kick), 0:21. Chiefs 27–24. Drive: 5 plays, 80 yards, 1:30.

Third quarter

- KC – Malcolm Bronson 51-yard interception return (Cairo Santos kick), 12:39. Chiefs 34–24.

Fourth quarter

- CIN – James Wright 9-yard pass from Matt Scott (Mike Nugent kick), 14:55. Chiefs 34–31. Drive: 10 plays, 75 yards, 5:40.
- KC – Cyrus Gray 2-yard run (Ryan Succop kick), 7:03. Chiefs 41–31. Drive: 13 plays, 77 yards, 7:52.
- CIN – Conner Vernon 12-yard pass from Matt Scott (Matt Scott run), 0:51. Chiefs 41–39. Drive: 7 plays, 46 yards, 1:42.

Top passers

- CIN – Jason Campbell – 6/15, 72 yards, 2 TD, 2 INT
- KC – Chase Daniel – 8/10, 126 yards, TD, INT

Top rushers

- CIN – Matt Scott – 6 rushes, 68 yards
- KC – Cyrus Gray – 11 rushes, 59 yards, TD

Top receivers

- CIN – A. J. Green – 2 receptions, 62 yards
- KC – Travis Kelce – 2 receptions, 73 yards, TD

==== Week 2: at Carolina Panthers ====
Week 2: Kansas City Chiefs at Carolina Panthers – Game summary

Quarter	1	2	3	4	Total
Chiefs	3	3	10	0	16
Panthers	0	14	14	0	28

at Bank of America Stadium, Charlotte, North Carolina

- Date: August 17
- Game time: 8:00 p.m. EDT/7:00 p.m. CDT
- Game weather: 86 °F (30 °C)
- Game attendance: 70,035
- Referee: Jerome Boger
- Recap, Game Book

Game information

First quarter

- KC – Ryan Succop 54-yard field goal, 9:20. Chiefs 3–0. Drive: 8 plays, 44 yards, 4:07.

Second quarter

- KC – Cairo Santos 44-yard field goal, 14:55. Chiefs 6–0. Drive: 7 plays, 26 yards, 3:14.
- CAR – Jonathan Stewart 2-yard run (Graham Gano kick), 12:37. Panthers 7–6. Drive: 4 plays, 66 yards, 2:18.
- CAR – Jonathan Stewart 3-yard run (Graham Gano kick), 6:23. Panthers 14–6. Drive: 6 plays, 50 yards, 2:56.

Third quarter

- KC – Ryan Succop 25-yard field goal, 9:39. Panthers 14–9. Drive: 11 plays, 73 yards, 5:21.
- KC – Travis Kelce 43-yard pass from Aaron Murray (Ryan Succop kick), 8:24. Chiefs 16–14. Drive: 1 play, 43 yards, 0:09.
- CAR – Brenton Bersin 16-yard pass from Derek Anderson (Graham Gano kick), 3:58. Panthers 21–16. Drive: 7 plays, 70 yards, 4:26.
- CAR – Fozzy Whittaker 1-yard run (Graham Gano kick), 0:18. Panthers 28–16. Drive: 4 plays, 8 yards, 2:01.

Fourth quarter

- No scoring plays.

Top passers

- KC – Alex Smith – 14/22, 127 yards
- CAR – Derek Anderson – 5/8, 91 yards, TD

Top rushers

- KC – Cyrus Gray – 10 rushes, 44 yards
- CAR – Fozzy Whittaker – 13 rushes, 71 yards, TD

Top receivers

- KC – Travis Kelce – 4 receptions, 63 yards, TD
- CAR – Kelvin Benjamin – 2 receptions, 41 yards

==== Week 3: vs. Minnesota Vikings ====
Week 3: Minnesota Vikings at Kansas City Chiefs – Game summary

Quarter	1	2	3	4	Total
Vikings	7	3	17	3	30
Chiefs	2	3	0	7	12

at Arrowhead Stadium, Kansas City, Missouri

- Date: August 23
- Game time: 7:00 p.m. CDT
- Game weather: Sunny, 97 °F (36 °C)
- Game attendance: 73,442
- Referee: Walt Coleman
- Recap, Game Book

Game information

First quarter

- MIN – Cordarrelle Patterson 53-yard pass from Matt Cassel (Blair Walsh kick), 9:56. Vikings 7–0. Drive: 5 plays, 97 yards, 2:55.
- KC – Matt Cassel fumble forced by Jaye Howard out of bounds in end zone for a Safety, 3:42. Vikings 7–2.

Second quarter

- KC – Cairo Santos 21-yard field goal, 2:59. Vikings 7–5. Drive: 14 plays, 77 yards, 7:43.
- MIN – Blair Walsh 41-yard field goal, 1:07. Vikings 10–5. Drive: 5 plays, 30 yards, 0:29.

Third quarter

- MIN – Blair Walsh 32-yard field goal, 4:40. Vikings 13–5. Drive: 9 plays, 49 yards, 4:33.
- MIN – Allen Reisner 8-yard pass from Teddy Bridgewater (Blair Walsh kick), 2:08. Vikings 20–5. Drive: 3 plays, 8 yards, 0:55.
- MIN – Allen Reisner 5-yard pass from Teddy Bridgewater (Blair Walsh kick), 0:24. Vikings 27–5. Drive: 1 play, 5 yards, 0:05.

Fourth quarter

- MIN – Blair Walsh 28-yard field goal, 4:16. Vikings 30–5. Drive: 11 plays, 73 yards, 5:45.
- KC – Albert Wilson 1-yard pass from Tyler Bray (Cairo Santos kick), 0:25. Vikings 30–12. Drive: 9 plays, 80 yards, 3:51.

Top passers

- MIN – Matt Cassel – 9/17, 152 yards, TD, INT
- KC – Alex Smith – 14/24, 140 yards, 2 INT

Top rushers

- MIN – Matt Asiata – 11 rushes, 48 yards
- KC – Cyrus Gray – 5 rushes, 31 yards

Top receivers

- MIN – Cordarrelle Patterson – 3 receptions, 71 yards, TD
- KC – Travis Kelce – 4 receptions, 49 yards

==== Week 4: at Green Bay Packers ====
Week 4: Kansas City Chiefs at Green Bay Packers – Game summary

Quarter	1	2	3	4	Total
Chiefs	0	7	7	0	14
Packers	7	13	7	7	34

at Lambeau Field, Green Bay, Wisconsin

- Date: August 28
- Game time: 7:00 p.m. CDT
- Game weather: Intermittent rain, 66 °F (19 °C)
- Game attendance: 74,059
- Referee: Terry McAulay
- Recap, Game Book

Game information

First quarter

- GB – Davante Adams 22-yard pass from Matt Flynn (Mason Crosby kick), 5:38. Packers 7–0. Drive: 12 plays, 86 yards, 5:42.

Second quarter

- GB – Mason Crosby 29-yard field goal, 13:26. Packers 10–0. Drive: 10 plays, 38 yards, 4:38.
- GB – Jeff Janis 33-yard pass from Scott Tolzien (Mason Crosby kick), 8:13. Packers 17–0. Drive: 8 plays, 59 yards, 3:03.
- GB – Mason Crosby 42-yard field goal, 5:42. Packers 20–0. Drive: 6 plays, 17 yards, 2:08.
- KC – Richard Gordon 2-yard pass from Tyler Bray (Ryan Succop kick), 3:21. Packers 20–7. Drive: 4 plays, 54 yards, 1:50.

Third quarter

- GB – LaDarius Perkins 11-yard pass from Matt Flynn (Mason Crosby kick), 6:23. Packers 27–7. Drive: 3 plays, 94 yards, 1:09.
- KC – Joe McKnight 1-yard run (Cairo Santos kick), 0:03. Packers 27–14. Drive: 13 plays, 80 yards, 6:20.

Fourth quarter

- GB – Myles White 6-yard pass from Scott Tolzien (Mason Crosby kick), 9:43. Packers 34–14. Drive: 9 plays, 39 yards, 5:20.

Top passers

- KC – Tyler Bray – 8/15, 116 yards, TD, INT
- GB – Scott Tolzien – 12/18, 139 yards, 2 TD

Top rushers

- KC – Joe McKnight – 10 rushes, 50 yards, TD
- GB – LaDarius Perkins – 8 rushes, 45 yards

Top receivers

- KC – A. J. Jenkins – 1 reception, 45 yards
- GB – Myles White – 4 receptions, 36 yards, TD

== Regular season ==
=== Schedule ===
Week	Date	Opponent	Result	Record	Venue	Recap
1	September 7	Tennessee Titans	**L** 10–26	0–1	Arrowhead Stadium	Recap
2	September 14	at **Denver Broncos**	**L** 17–24	0–2	Sports Authority Field at Mile High	Recap
3	September 21	at Miami Dolphins	**W** 34–15	1–2	Sun Life Stadium	Recap
4	September 29	New England Patriots	**W** 41–14	2–2	Arrowhead Stadium	Recap
5	October 5	at San Francisco 49ers	**L** 17–22	2–3	Levi's Stadium	Recap
6	Bye					
7	October 19	at **San Diego Chargers**	**W** 23–20	3–3	Qualcomm Stadium	Recap
8	October 26	St. Louis Rams	**W** 34–7	4–3	Arrowhead Stadium	Recap
9	November 2	New York Jets	**W** 24–10	5–3	Arrowhead Stadium	Recap
10	November 9	at Buffalo Bills	**W** 17–13	6–3	Ralph Wilson Stadium	Recap
11	November 16	Seattle Seahawks	**W** 24–20	7–3	Arrowhead Stadium	Recap
12	November 20	at **Oakland Raiders**	**L** 20–24	7–4	O.co Coliseum	Recap
13	November 30	**Denver Broncos**	**L** 16–29	7–5	Arrowhead Stadium	Recap
14	December 7	at Arizona Cardinals	**L** 14–17	7–6	University of Phoenix Stadium	Recap
15	December 14	**Oakland Raiders**	**W** 31–13	8–6	Arrowhead Stadium	Recap
16	December 21	at Pittsburgh Steelers	**L** 12–20	8–7	Heinz Field	Recap
17	December 28	**San Diego Chargers**	**W** 19–7	9–7	Arrowhead Stadium	Recap

Note: Intra-division opponents are in bold text.

=== Game summaries ===
==== Week 1: vs. Tennessee Titans ====
Week 1: Tennessee Titans at Kansas City Chiefs – Game summary

Quarter	1	2	3	4	Total
**Titans**	0	10	10	6	**26**
Chiefs	0	3	0	7	**10**

at Arrowhead Stadium, Kansas City, Missouri

- Date: September 7
- Game time: 12:00 p.m. CDT
- Game weather: Sunny, 69 °F (21 °C)
- Game attendance: 73,569
- Referee: Ronald Torbert
- TV announcers (CBS): Kevin Harlan and Rich Gannon
- Recap, Game Book

Game information

**First quarter**

- No scoring plays.

**Second quarter**

- KC – Cairo Santos 35-yard field goal, 13:35. Chiefs 3–0. **Drive: 8 plays, 64 yards, 4:18.**
- TEN – Delanie Walker 5-yard pass from Jake Locker (Ryan Succop kick), 3:31. Titans 7–3. **Drive: 11 plays, 62 yards, 6:30.**
- TEN – Ryan Succop 36-yard field goal, 0:03. Titans 10–3. **Drive: 4 plays, 24 yards, 0:25.**

**Third quarter**

- TEN – Kendall Wright 6-yard pass from Jake Locker (Ryan Succop kick), 10:26. Titans 17–3. **Drive: 9 plays, 80 yards, 4:34.**
- TEN – Ryan Succop 31-yard field goal, 2:46. Titans 20–3. **Drive: 9 plays, 45 yards, 3:45.**

**Fourth quarter**

- TEN – Ryan Succop 46-yard field goal, 12:39. Titans 23–3. **Drive: 7 plays, 16 yards, 3:47.**
- KC – Anthony Fasano 5-yard pass from Alex Smith (Cairo Santos kick), 10:09. Titans 23–10. **Drive: 10 plays, 83 yards, 2:30.**
- TEN – Ryan Succop 47-yard field goal, 4:50. Titans 26–10. **Drive: 10 plays, 51 yards, 5:19.**

**Top passers**

- TEN – Jake Locker – 22/33, 266 yards, 2 TD
- KC – Alex Smith – 19/35, 202 yards, TD, 3 INT

**Top rushers**

- TEN – Shonn Greene – 15 rushes, 71 yards
- KC – Alex Smith – 6 rushes, 36 yards

**Top receivers**

- TEN – Justin Hunter – 3 receptions, 63 yards
- KC – Donnie Avery – 7 receptions, 84 yards

==== Week 2: at Denver Broncos ====
Week 2: Kansas City Chiefs at Denver Broncos – Game summary

Quarter	1	2	3	4	Total
Chiefs	3	7	0	7	**17**
**Broncos**	7	14	0	3	**24**

at Sports Authority Field at Mile High, Denver, Colorado

- Date: September 14
- Game time: 3:25 p.m. CDT/2:25 p.m. MDT
- Game weather: Partly cloudy, 85 °F (29 °C)
- Game attendance: 76,900
- Referee: Gene Steratore
- TV announcers (CBS): Jim Nantz, Phil Simms and Tracy Wolfson
- Recap, Game Book

Game information

**First quarter**

- DEN – Julius Thomas 4-yard pass from Peyton Manning (Brandon McManus kick), 11:19. Broncos 7–0. **Drive: 7 plays, 80 yards, 3:41.**
- KC – Cairo Santos 45-yard field goal, 2:02. Broncos 7–3. **Drive: 6 plays, 33 yards, 2:21.**

**Second quarter**

- KC – Knile Davis 2-yard run (Cairo Santos kick), 10:32. Chiefs 10–7. **Drive: 10 plays, 66 yards, 4:32.**
- DEN – Jacob Tamme 4-yard pass from Peyton Manning (Brandon McManus kick), 7:19. Broncos 14–10. **Drive: 7 plays, 75 yards, 3:13.**
- DEN – Demaryius Thomas 12-yard pass from Peyton Manning (Brandon McManus kick), 1:09. Broncos 21–10. **Drive: 11 plays, 88 yards, 4:26.**

**Third quarter**

- No scoring plays.

**Fourth quarter**

- KC – Knile Davis 4-yard run (Cairo Santos kick), 7:11. Broncos 21–17. **Drive: 14 plays, 90 yards, 7:42.**
- DEN – Brandon McManus 20-yard field goal, 3:27. Broncos 24–17. **Drive: 7 plays, 44 yards, 3:44.**

**Top passers**

- KC – Alex Smith – 26/42, 255 yards
- DEN – Peyton Manning – 21/26, 242 yards, 3 TD

**Top rushers**

- KC – Knile Davis – 22 rushes, 79 yards, 2 TD
- DEN – Montee Ball – 12 rushes, 60 yards

**Top receivers**

- KC – Travis Kelce – 4 receptions, 81 yards
- DEN – Emmanuel Sanders – 8 receptions, 108 yards

With the loss, the Chiefs fell to 0-2. This would be their last 0-2 start until 2025, in addition to their last loss in Denver until 2023.

==== Week 3: at Miami Dolphins ====
Week 3: Kansas City Chiefs at Miami Dolphins – Game summary

Quarter	1	2	3	4	Total
**Chiefs**	0	14	7	13	**34**
Dolphins	0	3	12	0	**15**

at Sun Life Stadium, Miami Gardens, Florida

- Date: September 21
- Game time: 4:25 p.m. EDT/3:25 p.m. CDT
- Game weather: Cloudy, 88 °F (31 °C)
- Game attendance: 70,313
- Referee: Jeff Triplette
- TV announcers (CBS): Kevin Harlan and Rich Gannon
- Recap, Game Book

Game information

**First quarter**

- No scoring plays.

**Second quarter**

- KC – Knile Davis 21-yard run (Cairo Santos kick), 6:38. Chiefs 7–0. **Drive: 6 plays, 62 yards, 3:14.**
- KC – Travis Kelce 20-yard pass from Alex Smith (Cairo Santos kick), 1:35. Chiefs 14–0. **Drive: 8 plays, 76 yards, 2:42.**
- MIA – Caleb Sturgis 22-yard field goal, 0:00. Chiefs 14–3. **Drive: 8 plays, 74 yards, 1:35.**

**Third quarter**

- MIA – Brian Hartline 1-yard pass from Ryan Tannehill (Caleb Sturgis kick), 12:07. Chiefs 14–10. **Drive: 4 plays, 19 yards, 1:21.**
- KC – Joe McKnight 11-yard pass from Alex Smith (Cairo Santos kick), 6:36. Chiefs 21–10. **Drive: 10 plays, 66 yards, 5:31.**
- MIA – Caleb Sturgis 51-yard field goal, 5:54. Chiefs 21–13. **Drive: 4 plays, 0 yards, 0:42.**
- MIA – Alex Smith sacked in end zone by Randy Starks and Jelani Jenkins for a Safety, 2:38. Chiefs 21–15.

**Fourth quarter**

- KC – Joe McKnight 4-yard pass from Alex Smith (pass failed), 4:35. Chiefs 27–15. **Drive: 9 plays, 44 yards, 4:39.**
- KC – Cyrus Gray 6-yard run (Cairo Santos kick), 0:13. Chiefs 34–15. **Drive: 6 plays, 36 yards, 1:48.**

**Top passers**

- KC – Alex Smith – 19/25, 186 yards, 3 TD
- MIA – Ryan Tannehill – 21/43, 205 yards, TD

**Top rushers**

- KC – Knile Davis – 32 rushes, 132 yards, TD
- MIA – Lamar Miller – 15 rushes, 108 yards

**Top receivers**

- KC – Joe McKnight – 6 receptions, 64 yards, 2 TD
- MIA – Mike Wallace – 5 receptions, 74 yards

==== Week 4: vs. New England Patriots ====
Week 4: New England Patriots at Kansas City Chiefs – Game summary

Quarter	1	2	3	4	Total
Patriots	0	0	7	7	**14**
**Chiefs**	7	10	10	14	**41**

at Arrowhead Stadium, Kansas City, Missouri

- Date: September 29
- Game time: 7:30 p.m. CDT
- Game weather: Clear, 82 °F (28 °C)
- Game attendance: 76,613
- Referee: John Parry
- TV announcers (ESPN): Mike Tirico, Jon Gruden and Lisa Salters
- Recap, Game Book

Game information

**First quarter**

- KC – Jamaal Charles 2-yard run (Cairo Santos kick), 2:15. Chiefs 7–0. **Drive: 11 plays, 73 yards, 5:58.**

**Second quarter**

- KC – Jamaal Charles 5-yard pass from Alex Smith (Cairo Santos kick), 10:58. Chiefs 14–0. **Drive: 3 plays, 86 yards, 1:27.**
- KC – Cairo Santos 22-yard field goal, 0:00. Chiefs 17–0. **Drive: 7 plays, 85 yards, 2:24.**

**Third quarter**

- KC – Jamaal Charles 8-yard pass from Alex Smith (Cairo Santos kick), 7:53. Chiefs 24–0. **Drive: 2 plays, 9 yards, 0:45.**
- KC – Cairo Santos 31-yard field goal, 5:29. Chiefs 27–0. **Drive: 4 plays, 0 yards, 1:34.**
- NE – Brandon LaFell 44-yard pass from Tom Brady (Stephen Gostkowski kick), 3:26. Chiefs 27–7. **Drive: 4 plays, 81 yards, 2:03.**

**Fourth quarter**

- KC – Travis Kelce 2-yard pass from Alex Smith (Cairo Santos kick), 11:52. Chiefs 34–7. **Drive: 12 plays, 80 yards, 6:34.**
- KC – Husain Abdullah 39-yard interception return (Cairo Santos kick), 10:34. Chiefs 41–7.
- NE – Rob Gronkowski 13-yard pass from Jimmy Garoppolo (Stephen Gostkowski kick), 7:25. Chiefs 41–14. **Drive: 7 plays, 81 yards, 3:09.**

**Top passers**

- NE – Tom Brady – 14/23, 159 yards, TD, 2 INT
- KC – Alex Smith – 20/26, 248 yards, 3 TD

**Top rushers**

- NE – Stevan Ridley – 5 rushes, 28 yards
- KC – Knile Davis – 16 rushes, 107 yards

**Top receivers**

- NE – Brandon LaFell – 6 receptions, 119 yards, TD
- KC – Travis Kelce – 8 receptions, 93 yards, TD

==== Week 5: at San Francisco 49ers ====
Week 5: Kansas City Chiefs at San Francisco 49ers – Game summary

Quarter	1	2	3	4	Total
Chiefs	7	3	7	0	**17**
**49ers**	3	10	3	6	**22**

at Levi's Stadium, Santa Clara, California

- Date: October 5
- Game time: 3:25 p.m. CDT/1:25 p.m. PDT
- Game weather: Sunny, 85 °F (29 °C)
- Game attendance: 70,799
- Referee: Walt Coleman
- TV announcers (CBS): Jim Nantz, Phil Simms and Tracy Wolfson
- Recap, Game Book

Game information

**First quarter**

- KC – Travis Kelce 2-yard pass from Alex Smith (Cairo Santos kick), 8:37. Chiefs 7–0. **Drive: 12 plays, 81 yards, 6:23.**
- SF – Phil Dawson 31-yard field goal, 4:36. Chiefs 7–3. **Drive: 10 plays, 59 yards, 4:01.**

**Second quarter**

- KC – Cairo Santos 42-yard field goal, 12:18. Chiefs 10–3. **Drive: 14 plays, 63 yards, 7:18.**
- SF – Phil Dawson 55-yard field goal, 9:44. Chiefs 10–6. **Drive: 7 plays, 44 yards, 2:34.**
- SF – Stevie Johnson 9-yard pass from Colin Kaepernick (Phil Dawson kick), 0:31. 49ers 13–10. **Drive: 13 plays, 93 yards, 6:39.**

**Third quarter**

- KC – De'Anthony Thomas 17-yard run (Cairo Santos kick), 11:56. Chiefs 17–13. **Drive: 4 plays, 58 yards, 1:31.**
- SF – Phil Dawson 52-yard field goal, 6:16. Chiefs 17–16. **Drive: 9 plays, 43 yards, 5:40.**

**Fourth quarter**

- SF – Phil Dawson 27-yard field goal, 8:42. 49ers 19–17. **Drive: 13 plays, 71 yards, 6:55.**
- SF – Phil Dawson 30-yard field goal, 2:12. 49ers 22–17. **Drive: 14 plays, 56 yards, 4:58.**

**Top passers**

- KC – Alex Smith – 16/30, 158 yards, TD, INT
- SF – Colin Kaepernick – 14/26, 201 yards, TD

**Top rushers**

- KC – Jamaal Charles – 15 rushes, 80 yards
- SF – Frank Gore – 18 rushes, 107 yards

**Top receivers**

- KC – Junior Hemingway – 4 receptions, 50 yards
- SF – Brandon Lloyd – 3 receptions, 76 yards

With the loss, the Chiefs would fall to 2-3. As of 2024, this marked the Chiefs last loss to the 49ers.

==== Week 7: at San Diego Chargers ====
Week 7: Kansas City Chiefs at San Diego Chargers – Game summary

Quarter	1	2	3	4	Total
**Chiefs**	0	10	3	10	**23**
Chargers	7	7	0	6	**20**

at Qualcomm Stadium, San Diego, California

- Date: October 19
- Game time: 3:05 p.m. CDT/1:05 p.m. PDT
- Game weather: Sunny, 75 °F (24 °C)
- Game attendance: 65,260
- Referee: Bill Vinovich
- TV announcers (CBS): Spero Dedes and Solomon Wilcots
- Recap, Game Book

Game information

**First quarter**

- SD – John Phillips 1-yard pass from Philip Rivers (Nick Novak kick), 3:15. Chargers 7–0. **Drive: 5 plays, 61 yards, 2:41.**

**Second quarter**

- KC – Jamaal Charles 16-yard run (Cairo Santos kick), 14:51. Tied 7–7. **Drive: 6 plays, 66 yards, 3:24.**
- KC – Cairo Santos 28-yard field goal, 3:11. Chiefs 10–7. **Drive: 14 plays, 56 yards, 9:31.**
- SD – Antonio Gates 27-yard pass from Philip Rivers (Nick Novak kick), 0:14. Chargers 14–10. **Drive: 6 plays, 80 yards, 0:41.**

**Third quarter**

- KC – Cairo Santos 40-yard field goal, 8:35. Chargers 14–13. **Drive: 12 plays, 63 yards, 6:25.**

**Fourth quarter**

- KC – Anthony Sherman 11-yard pass from Alex Smith (Cairo Santos kick), 14:50. Chiefs 20–14. **Drive: 11 plays, 70 yards, 7:43.**
- SD – Nick Novak 24-yard field goal, 9:36. Chiefs 20–17. **Drive: 12 plays, 77 yards, 5:14.**
- SD – Nick Novak 48-yard field goal, 1:57. Tied 20–20. **Drive: 9 plays, 58 yards, 3:42.**
- KC – Cairo Santos 48-yard field goal, 0:21. Chiefs 23–20. **Drive: 9 plays, 62 yards, 1:36.**

**Top passers**

- KC – Alex Smith – 19/28, 221 yards, TD
- SD – Philip Rivers – 17/31, 205 yards, 2 TD, INT

**Top rushers**

- KC – Jamaal Charles – 22 rushes, 95 yards, TD
- SD – Branden Oliver – 15 rushes, 67 yards

**Top receivers**

- KC – Dwayne Bowe – 5 receptions, 84 yards
- SD – Antonio Gates – 3 receptions, 61 yards, TD

==== Week 8: vs. St. Louis Rams ====
Week 8: St. Louis Rams at Kansas City Chiefs – Game summary

Quarter	1	2	3	4	Total
Rams	7	0	0	0	**7**
**Chiefs**	0	10	10	14	**34**

at Arrowhead Stadium, Kansas City, Missouri

- Date: October 26
- Game time: 12:00 p.m. CDT
- Game weather: Sunny, 70 °F (21 °C)
- Game attendance: 75,972
- Referee: Jeff Triplette
- TV announcers (Fox): Dick Stockton, Donovan McNabb and Kristina Pink
- Recap, Game Book

Game information

**First quarter**

- STL – Lance Kendricks 1-yard pass from Austin Davis (Greg Zuerlein kick), 11:56. Rams 7–0. **Drive: 6 plays, 65 yards, 3:04.**

**Second quarter**

- KC – Jamaal Charles 1-yard run (Cairo Santos kick), 12:00. Tied 7–7. **Drive: 10 plays, 53 yards, 5:37.**
- KC – Cairo Santos 53-yard field goal, 0:01. Chiefs 10–7. **Drive: 10 plays, 37 yards, 5:31.**

**Third quarter**

- KC – Knile Davis 99-yard kickoff return (Cairo Santos kick), 14:48. Chiefs 17–7.
- KC – Cairo Santos 28-yard field goal, 8:46. Chiefs 20–7. **Drive: 11 plays, 84 yards, 4:23.**

**Fourth quarter**

- KC – Jamaal Charles 36-yard run (Cairo Santos kick), 14:18. Chiefs 27–7. **Drive: 5 plays, 71 yards, 2:07.**
- KC – Knile Davis 3-yard run (Cairo Santos kick), 6:28. Chiefs 34–7. **Drive: 12 plays, 79 yards, 6:54.**

**Top passers**

- STL – Austin Davis – 15/25, 160 yards, TD, INT
- KC – Alex Smith – 25/29, 223 yards

**Top rushers**

- STL – Tre Mason – 7 rushes, 32 yards
- KC – Jamaal Charles – 14 rushes, 67 yards, 2 TD

**Top receivers**

- STL – Kenny Britt – 2 receptions, 52 yards
- KC – Dwayne Bowe – 6 receptions, 64 yards

==== Week 9: vs. New York Jets ====
Week 9: New York Jets at Kansas City Chiefs – Game summary

Quarter	1	2	3	4	Total
Jets	0	10	0	0	**10**
**Chiefs**	14	7	3	0	**24**

at Arrowhead Stadium, Kansas City, Missouri

- Date: November 2
- Game time: 12:00 p.m. CST
- Game weather: Sunny, clear, 57 °F (14 °C)
- Game attendance: 74,127
- Referee: Tony Corrente
- TV announcers (CBS): Greg Gumbel, Trent Green and Evan Washburn
- Recap, Game Book

Game information

**First quarter**

- KC – Jamaal Charles 1-yard run (Cairo Santos kick), 8:38. Chiefs 7–0. **Drive: 12 plays, 81 yards, 6:22.**
- KC – Anthony Fasano 2-yard pass from Alex Smith (Cairo Santos kick), 3:20. Chiefs 14–0. **Drive: 6 plays, 71 yards, 3:40.**

**Second quarter**

- NYJ – Eric Decker 3-yard pass from Michael Vick (Nick Folk kick), 2:09. Chiefs 14–7. **Drive: 15 plays, 81 yards, 8:57.**
- KC – Travis Kelce 12-yard pass from Alex Smith (Cairo Santos kick), 0:39. Chiefs 21–7. **Drive: 4 plays, 29 yards, 1:30.**
- NYJ – Nick Folk 39-yard field goal, 0:00. Chiefs 21–10. **Drive: 4 plays, 12 yards, 0:39.**

**Third quarter**

- KC – Cairo Santos 19-yard field goal, 5:06. Chiefs 24–10. **Drive: 16 plays, 75 yards, 8:00.**

**Fourth quarter**

- No scoring plays.

**Top passers**

- NYJ – Michael Vick – 21/28, 196 yards, TD
- KC – Alex Smith – 21/31, 199 yards, 2 TD

**Top rushers**

- NYJ – Chris Johnson – 11 rushes, 69 yards
- KC – Jamaal Charles – 20 rushes, 78 yards, TD

**Top receivers**

- NYJ – Percy Harvin – 11 receptions, 129 yards
- KC – Travis Kelce – 4 receptions, 67 yards, TD

==== Week 10: at Buffalo Bills ====
Week 10: Kansas City Chiefs at Buffalo Bills – Game summary

Quarter	1	2	3	4	Total
**Chiefs**	3	0	0	14	**17**
Bills	7	3	3	0	**13**

at Ralph Wilson Stadium, Orchard Park, New York

- Date: November 9
- Game time: 1:00 p.m. EST/12:00 p.m. CST
- Game weather: Cloudy, 42 °F (6 °C)
- Game attendance: 68,119
- Referee: Brad Allen
- TV announcers (CBS): Spero Dedes and Solomon Wilcots
- Recap, Game Book

Game information

**First quarter**

- BUF – Chris Hogan 25-yard pass from Kyle Orton (Dan Carpenter kick), 9:51. Bills 7–0. **Drive: 7 plays, 51 yards, 3:00.**
- KC – Cairo Santos 36-yard field goal, 5:24. Bills 7–3. **Drive: 10 plays, 62 yards, 4:27.**

**Second quarter**

- BUF – Dan Carpenter 26-yard field goal, 7:09. Bills 10–3. **Drive: 9 plays, 23 yards, 3:57.**

**Third quarter**

- BUF – Dan Carpenter 21-yard field goal, 3:06. Bills 13–3. **Drive: 11 plays, 73 yards, 5:02.**

**Fourth quarter**

- KC – Jamaal Charles 39-yard run (Cairo Santos kick), 13:30. Bills 13–10. **Drive: 10 plays, 80 yards, 4:36.**
- KC – Alex Smith 8-yard run (Cairo Santos kick), 8:59. Chiefs 17–13. **Drive: 2 plays, 26 yards, 0:45.**

**Top passers**

- KC – Alex Smith – 17/29, 177 yards
- BUF – Kyle Orton – 29/48, 259 yards, TD

**Top rushers**

- KC – Jamaal Charles – 15 rushes, 98 yards, TD
- BUF – Anthony Dixon – 9 rushes, 62 yards

**Top receivers**

- KC – Dwayne Bowe – 8 receptions, 93 yards
- BUF – Bryce Brown – 6 receptions, 65 yards

==== Week 11: vs. Seattle Seahawks ====
Week 11: Seattle Seahawks at Kansas City Chiefs – Game summary

Quarter	1	2	3	4	Total
Seahawks	0	13	7	0	**20**
**Chiefs**	7	7	3	7	**24**

at Arrowhead Stadium, Kansas City, Missouri

- Date: November 16
- Game time: 12:00 p.m. CST
- Game weather: Cloudy, 21 °F (−6 °C)
- Game attendance: 76,463
- Referee: Bill Leavy
- TV announcers (Fox): Kenny Albert, Daryl Johnston and Tony Siragusa
- Recap, Game Book

Game information

**First quarter**

- KC – Jamaal Charles 1-yard run (Cairo Santos kick), 4:22. Chiefs 7–0. **Drive: 15 plays, 86 yards, 9:01.**

**Second quarter**

- SEA – Doug Baldwin 7-yard pass from Russell Wilson (Steven Hauschka kick), 10:22. Tied 7–7. **Drive: 16 plays, 90 yards, 9:00.**
- KC – Jamaal Charles 16-yard run (Cairo Santos kick), 8:09. Chiefs 14–7. **Drive: 4 plays, 80 yards, 2:13.**
- SEA – Steven Hauschka 24-yard field goal, 1:39. Chiefs 14–10. **Drive: 13 plays, 76 yards, 6:30.**
- SEA – Steven Hauschka 27-yard field goal, 0:00. Chiefs 14–13. **Drive: 8 plays, 38 yards, 1:09.**

**Third quarter**

- KC – Cairo Santos 23-yard field goal, 7:39. Chiefs 17–13. **Drive: 12 plays, 67 yards, 7:21.**
- SEA – Tony Moeaki 1-yard pass from Russell Wilson (Steven Hauschka kick), 0:23. Seahawks 20–17. **Drive: 5 plays, 44 yards, 2:42.**

**Fourth quarter**

- KC – Knile Davis 4-yard run (Cairo Santos kick), 13:41. Chiefs 24–20. **Drive: 4 plays, 71 yards, 1:42.**

**Top passers**

- SEA – Russell Wilson – 20/32, 178 yards, 2 TD
- KC – Alex Smith – 11/16, 108 yards

**Top rushers**

- SEA – Marshawn Lynch – 24 rushes, 124 yards
- KC – Jamaal Charles – 20 rushes, 159 yards, 2 TD

**Top receivers**

- SEA – Jermaine Kearse – 5 receptions, 54 yards
- KC – Travis Kelce – 3 receptions, 37 yards

==== Week 12: at Oakland Raiders ====
Week 12: Kansas City Chiefs at Oakland Raiders – Game summary

Quarter	1	2	3	4	Total
Chiefs	0	3	7	10	**20**
**Raiders**	7	7	3	7	**24**

at O.co Coliseum, Oakland, California

- Date: November 20
- Game time: 7:25 p.m. CST/5:25 p.m. PST
- Game weather: Cloudy, 57 °F (14 °C)
- Game attendance: 52,865
- Referee: John Parry
- TV announcers (NFLN): Jim Nantz, Phil Simms and Tracy Wolfson
- Recap, Game Book

Game information

**First quarter**

- OAK – Latavius Murray 11-yard run (Sebastian Janikowski kick), 6:33. Raiders 7–0. **Drive: 8 plays, 60 yards, 3:29.**

**Second quarter**

- OAK – Latavius Murray 90-yard run (Sebastian Janikowski kick), 12:28. Raiders 14–0. **Drive: 1 play, 90 yards, 0:12.**
- KC – Cairo Santos 24-yard field goal, 7:19. Raiders 14–3. **Drive: 4 plays, 6 yards, 0:52.**

**Third quarter**

- OAK – Sebastian Janikowski 40-yard field goal, 5:05. Raiders 17–3. **Drive: 9 plays, 27 yards, 4:39.**
- KC – Anthony Fasano 19-yard pass from Alex Smith (Cairo Santos kick), 1:52. Raiders 17–10. **Drive: 6 plays, 60 yards, 3:13.**

**Fourth quarter**

- KC – Jamaal Charles 30-yard pass from Alex Smith (Cairo Santos kick), 12:20. Tied 17–17. **Drive: 4 plays, 65 yards, 2:19.**
- KC – Cairo Santos 25-yard field goal, 9:03. Chiefs 20–17. **Drive: 5 plays, 30 yards, 2:10.**
- OAK – James Jones 9-yard pass from Derek Carr (Sebastian Janikowski kick), 1:42. Raiders 24–20. **Drive: 17 plays, 80 yards, 7:21.**

**Top passers**

- KC – Alex Smith – 20/36, 234 yards, 2 TD
- OAK – Derek Carr – 18/35, 174 yards, TD

**Top rushers**

- KC – Jamaal Charles – 19 rushes, 80 yards
- OAK – Latavius Murray – 4 rushes, 112 yards, 2 TD

**Top receivers**

- KC – Travis Kelce – 4 receptions, 67 yards
- OAK – Andre Holmes – 5 receptions, 55 yards

==== Week 13: vs. Denver Broncos ====
Week 13: Denver Broncos at Kansas City Chiefs – Game summary

Quarter	1	2	3	4	Total
**Broncos**	14	6	3	6	**29**
Chiefs	0	7	3	6	**16**

at Arrowhead Stadium, Kansas City, Missouri

- Date: November 30
- Game time: 7:30 p.m. CST
- Game weather: Cloudy, 27 °F (−3 °C)
- Game attendance: 76,894
- Referee: Walt Coleman
- TV announcers (NBC): Al Michaels, Cris Collinsworth and Michele Tafoya
- Recap, Game Book

Game information

**First quarter**

- DEN – Demaryius Thomas 23-yard pass from Peyton Manning (Connor Barth kick), 8:57. Broncos 7–0. **Drive: 8 plays, 74 yards, 4:54.**
- DEN – C. J. Anderson 15-yard pass from Peyton Manning (Connor Barth kick), 1:58. Broncos 14–0. **Drive: 10 plays, 48 yards, 4:46.**

**Second quarter**

- DEN – Connor Barth 22-yard field goal, 7:14. Broncos 17–0. **Drive: 15 plays, 63 yards, 7:58.**
- KC – Anthony Fasano 20-yard pass from Alex Smith (Cairo Santos kick), 3:02. Broncos 17–7. **Drive: 7 plays, 69 yards, 4:12.**
- DEN – Connor Barth 24-yard field goal, 0:16. Broncos 20–7. **Drive: 10 plays, 53 yards, 2:46.**

**Third quarter**

- KC – Cairo Santos 39-yard field goal, 12:43. Broncos 20–10. **Drive: 4 plays, 2 yards, 1:17.**
- DEN – Connor Barth 30-yard field goal, 6:16. Broncos 23–10. **Drive: 4 plays, 2 yards, 0:58.**

**Fourth quarter**

- DEN – Connor Barth 33-yard field goal, 14:44. Broncos 26–10. **Drive: 7 plays, 23 yards, 3:06.**
- KC – Jamaal Charles 12-yard pass from Alex Smith (pass failed), 11:46. Broncos 26–16. **Drive: 7 plays, 62 yards, 2:58.**
- DEN – Connor Barth 37-yard field goal, 7:33. Broncos 29–16. **Drive: 9 plays, 65 yards, 4:13.**

**Top passers**

- DEN – Peyton Manning – 17/34, 179 yards, 2 TD
- KC – Alex Smith – 15/23, 153 yards, 2 TD, INT

**Top rushers**

- DEN – C. J. Anderson – 32 rushes, 168 yards
- KC – Jamaal Charles – 10 rushes, 35 yards

**Top receivers**

- DEN – Emmanuel Sanders – 6 receptions, 73 yards
- KC – Travis Kelce – 3 receptions, 36 yards

With the loss, the Chiefs fell to 7-5. As of 2024, this is the last time the Chiefs were swept by the Broncos. This was the last time the Chiefs were swept by an AFC West divisional rival until the 2025 Chargers.

==== Week 14: at Arizona Cardinals ====
Week 14: Kansas City Chiefs at Arizona Cardinals – Game summary

Quarter	1	2	3	4	Total
Chiefs	7	7	0	0	**14**
**Cardinals**	3	3	11	0	**17**

at University of Phoenix Stadium, Glendale, Arizona

- Date: December 7
- Game time: 3:05 p.m. CST/2:05 p.m. MST
- Game weather: None (retractable roof closed)
- Game attendance: 62,387
- Referee: Craig Wrolstad
- TV announcers (CBS): Greg Gumbel, Trent Green and Evan Washburn
- Recap, Game Book

Game information

**First quarter**

- ARI – Chandler Catanzaro 44-yard field goal, 10:55. Cardinals 3–0. **Drive: 8 plays, 36 yards, 4:05.**
- KC – Jamaal Charles 63-yard run (Cairo Santos kick), 9:35. Chiefs 7–3. **Drive: 3 plays, 78 yards, 1:20.**

**Second quarter**

- ARI – Chandler Catanzaro 33-yard field goal, 7:43. Chiefs 7–6. **Drive: 16 plays, 65 yards, 8:07.**
- KC – Jamaal Charles 18-yard pass from Alex Smith (Cairo Santos kick), 1:12. Chiefs 14–6. **Drive: 11 plays, 66 yards, 6:31.**

**Third quarter**

- ARI – Chandler Catanzaro 39-yard field goal, 9:02. Chiefs 14–9. **Drive: 6 plays, 40 yards, 1:16.**
- ARI – Jaron Brown 26-yard pass from Drew Stanton (Drew Stanton-John Carlson pass), 3:26. Cardinals 17–14. **Drive: 5 plays, 42 yards, 2:00.**

**Fourth quarter**

- No scoring plays.

**Top passers**

- KC – Alex Smith – 26/39, 293 yards, TD, INT
- ARI – Drew Stanton – 15/30, 239 yards, TD

**Top rushers**

- KC – Jamaal Charles – 10 rushes, 91 yards, TD
- ARI – Kerwynn Williams – 19 rushes, 100 yards

**Top receivers**

- KC – Travis Kelce – 7 receptions, 110 yards
- ARI – Michael Floyd – 4 receptions, 85 yards

With the loss, the Chiefs fell to 7-6. As of 2022, this the last time the Chiefs lost to Arizona.

==== Week 15: vs. Oakland Raiders ====
Week 15: Oakland Raiders at Kansas City Chiefs – Game summary

Quarter	1	2	3	4	Total
Raiders	0	3	3	7	**13**
**Chiefs**	7	3	21	0	**31**

at Arrowhead Stadium, Kansas City, Missouri

- Date: December 14
- Game time: 12:00 p.m. CST
- Game weather: Cloudy, 58 °F (14 °C)
- Game attendance: 72,153
- Referee: Jerome Boger
- TV announcers (CBS): Spero Dedes and Solomon Wilcots
- Recap, Game Book

Game information

**First quarter**

- KC – De'Anthony Thomas 81-yard punt return (Cairo Santos kick), 2:38. Chiefs 7–0.

**Second quarter**

- KC – Cairo Santos 41-yard field goal, 8:01. Chiefs 10–0. **Drive: 6 plays, 45 yards, 2:46.**
- OAK – Sebastian Janikowski 53-yard field goal, 0:00. Chiefs 10–3. **Drive: 10 plays, 45 yards, 0:59.**

**Third quarter**

- OAK – Sebastian Janikowski 33-yard field goal, 11:44. Chiefs 10–6. **Drive: 4 plays, 0 yards, 1:30.**
- KC – Knile Davis 3-yard run (Cairo Santos kick), 6:46. Chiefs 17–6. **Drive: 9 plays, 70 yards, 4:58.**
- KC – Travis Kelce 20-yard pass from Alex Smith (Cairo Santos kick), 5:50. Chiefs 24–6. **Drive: 2 plays, 21 yards, 0:45.**
- KC – Knile Davis 70-yard pass from Alex Smith (Cairo Santos kick), 2:04. Chiefs 31–6. **Drive: 3 plays, 70 yards, 1:30.**

**Fourth quarter**

- OAK – James Jones 1-yard pass from Derek Carr (Sebastian Janikowski kick), 0:34. Chiefs 31–13. **Drive: 8 plays, 63 yards, 1:45.**

**Top passers**

- OAK – Derek Carr – 27/56, 222 yards, TD
- KC – Alex Smith – 18/30, 297 yards, 2 TD

**Top rushers**

- OAK – Latavius Murray – 12 rushes, 59 yards
- KC – Jamaal Charles – 12 rushes, 52 yards

**Top receivers**

- OAK – Andre Holmes – 5 receptions, 70 yards
- KC – Knile Davis – 1 reception, 70 yards, TD

==== Week 16: at Pittsburgh Steelers ====
Week 16: Kansas City Chiefs at Pittsburgh Steelers – Game summary

Quarter	1	2	3	4	Total
Chiefs	3	3	0	6	**12**
**Steelers**	3	7	7	3	**20**

at Heinz Field, Pittsburgh, Pennsylvania

- Date: December 21
- Game time: 1:00 p.m. EST/12:00 p.m. CST
- Game weather: Sunny, 36 °F (2 °C)
- Game attendance: 60,865
- Referee: Ron Torbert
- TV announcers (CBS): Greg Gumbel, Trent Green and Evan Washburn
- Recap, Game Book

Game information

**First quarter**

- PIT – Shaun Suisham 23-yard field goal, 9:15. Steelers 3–0. **Drive: 11 plays, 80 yards, 5:45.**
- KC – Cairo Santos 35-yard field goal, 2:06. Tied 3–3. **Drive: 14 plays, 65 yards, 7:09.**

**Second quarter**

- KC – Cairo Santos 25-yard field goal, 9:25. Chiefs 6–3. **Drive: 12 plays, 44 yards, 6:10.**
- PIT – Le'Veon Bell 1-yard run (Shaun Suisham kick), 4:18. Steelers 10–6. **Drive: 11 plays, 80 yards, 5:07.**

**Third quarter**

- PIT – Antonio Brown 3-yard pass from Ben Roethlisberger (Shaun Suisham kick), 0:34. Steelers 17–6. **Drive: 10 plays, 75 yards, 5:52.**

**Fourth quarter**

- KC – Cairo Santos 43-yard field goal, 10:18. Steelers 17–9. **Drive: 12 plays, 58 yards, 5:16.**
- PIT – Shaun Suisham 23-yard field goal, 4:04. Steelers 20–9. **Drive: 12 plays, 70 yards, 6:14.**
- KC – Cairo Santos 23-yard field goal, 1:37. Steelers 20–12. **Drive: 11 plays, 45 yards, 2:27.**

**Top passers**

- KC – Alex Smith – 31/45, 311 yards
- PIT – Ben Roethlisberger – 18/25, 220 yards, TD

**Top rushers**

- KC – Jamaal Charles – 9 rushes, 29 yards
- PIT – Le'Veon Bell – 20 rushes, 63 yards, TD

**Top receivers**

- KC – Albert Wilson – 5 receptions, 87 yards
- PIT – Antonio Brown – 7 receptions, 72 yards, TD

==== Week 17: vs. San Diego Chargers ====
Week 17: San Diego Chargers at Kansas City Chiefs – Game summary

Quarter	1	2	3	4	Total
Chargers	0	7	0	0	**7**
**Chiefs**	3	13	3	0	**19**

at Arrowhead Stadium, Kansas City, Missouri

- Date: December 28
- Game time: 12:00 p.m. CST
- Game weather: Clear, 31 °F (−1 °C)
- Game attendance: 73,952
- Referee: Pete Morelli
- TV announcers (CBS): Ian Eagle, Dan Fouts and Jenny Dell
- Recap, Game Book

Game information

**First quarter**

- KC – Cairo Santos 43-yard field goal, 6:33. Chiefs 3–0. **Drive: 11 plays, 54 yards, 6:26.**

**Second quarter**

- KC – Travis Kelce fumble recovery in end zone (Cairo Santos kick), 12:50. Chiefs 10–0. **Drive: 9 plays, 94 yards, 4:39.**
- SD – Branden Oliver 1-yard run (Nick Novak kick), 10:50. Chiefs 10–7. **Drive: 6 plays, 69 yards, 2:00.**
- KC – Cairo Santos 21-yard field goal, 3:58. Chiefs 13–7. **Drive: 4 plays, 5 yards, 2:09.**
- KC – Cairo Santos 27-yard field goal, 0:33. Chiefs 16–7. **Drive: 7 plays, 41 yards, 1:12.**

**Third quarter**

- KC – Cairo Santos 31-yard field goal, 8:24. Chiefs 19–7. **Drive: 7 plays, 4 yards, 3:01.**

**Fourth quarter**

- No scoring plays.

**Top passers**

- SD – Philip Rivers – 20/34, 291 yards, 2 INT
- KC – Chase Daniel – 16/27, 157 yards

**Top rushers**

- SD – Branden Oliver – 14 rushes, 71 yards, TD
- KC – Jamaal Charles – 13 rushes, 54 yards

**Top receivers**

- SD – Eddie Royal – 4 receptions, 95 yards
- KC – Travis Kelce – 7 receptions, 84 yards

=== Standings ===
==== Division ====
AFC West
	W	L	T	PCT	DIV	CONF	PF	PA	STK
^{(2)} Denver Broncos	12	4	0	.750	6–0	10–2	482	354	W1
Kansas City Chiefs (Note: Kansas City is ranked ahead of San Diego based on head-to-head sweep (Week 7, 23–20; Week 17, 19–7).)	9	7	0	.563	3–3	7–5	353	281	W1
San Diego Chargers	9	7	0	.563	2–4	6–6	348	348	L1
Oakland Raiders	3	13	0	.188	1–5	2–10	253	452	L1

==== Conference ====
AFC
#	Team	Division	W	L	T	PCT	DIV	CONF	SOS	SOV	STK
**Division leaders**
1 (Note: New England defeated Denver head-to-head (Week 9, 43–21).)	New England Patriots	East	12	4	0	.750	4–2	9–3	.514	.487	L1
2	Denver Broncos	West	12	4	0	.750	6–0	10–2	.521	.484	W1
3 (Note: Pittsburgh defeated Indianapolis head-to-head (Week 8, 51–34).)	Pittsburgh Steelers	North	11	5	0	.688	4–2	9–3	.451	.486	W4
4	Indianapolis Colts	South	11	5	0	.688	6–0	9–3	.479	.372	W1
**Wild Cards**
5	Cincinnati Bengals	North	10	5	1	.656	3–3	7–5	.498	.425	L1
6	Baltimore Ravens	North	10	6	0	.625	3–3	6–6	.475	.378	W1
**Did not qualify for the postseason**
7 (Note: Kansas City finished ahead of San Diego in the AFC West based on head-to-head sweep (Week 7, 23–20; Week 17, 19–7). Houston finished ahead of Kansas City and Buffalo based on conference record. Kansas City finished ahead of Buffalo based on head-to-head victory (Week 10, 17–13). San Diego finished ahead of Buffalo based on head-to-head victory (Week 3, 22–10).)	Houston Texans	South	9	7	0	.563	4–2	8–4	.447	.299	W2
8	Kansas City Chiefs	West	9	7	0	.563	3–3	7–5	.512	.500	W1
9	San Diego Chargers	West	9	7	0	.563	2–4	6–6	.512	.403	L1
10	Buffalo Bills	East	9	7	0	.563	4–2	5–7	.516	.486	W1
11	Miami Dolphins	East	8	8	0	.500	3–3	6–6	.512	.406	L1
12	Cleveland Browns	North	7	9	0	.438	2–4	4–8	.479	.371	L5
13	New York Jets	East	4	12	0	.250	1–5	4–8	.543	.375	W1
14 (Note: Jacksonville finished ahead of Oakland based on record vs. common opponents (1–4 to 0–5).)	Jacksonville Jaguars	South	3	13	0	.188	1–5	2–10	.514	.313	L1
15	Oakland Raiders	West	3	13	0	.188	1–5	2–10	.570	.542	L1
16	Tennessee Titans	South	2	14	0	.125	1–5	2–10	.506	.375	L10
**Tiebreakers** (Note: When breaking ties for three or more teams under the NFL's rules, they are first broken within divisions, then comparing only the highest ranked remaining team from each division.)
