= Daniel Sorensen =

American football player and coach (born 1990)

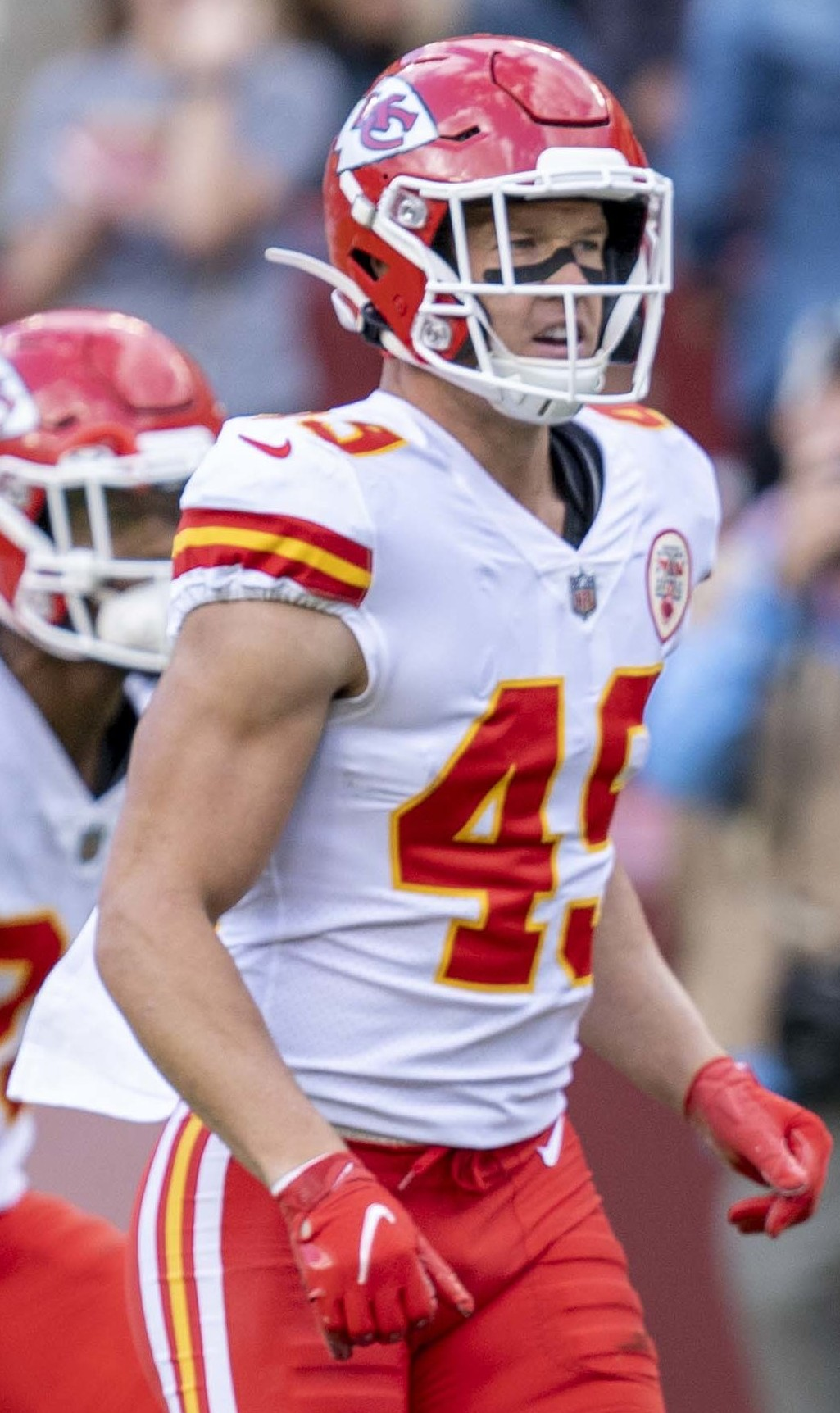
- Sorensen with the Kansas City Chiefs in 2021

BYU Cougars
- Title: Assistant safeties coach

Personal information
- Born: March 5, 1990 (age 36); Riverside, California, U.S.
- Listed height: 6 ft 2 in (1.88 m)
- Listed weight: 208 lb (94 kg)

Career information
- Position: Safety (No. 49, 25)
- High school: Colton (Colton, California)
- College: BYU (2008, 2011–2013)
- NFL draft: 2014: undrafted

Career history

Playing
- Kansas City Chiefs (2014–2021); New Orleans Saints (2022–2023)

Coaching
- BYU (2026–present) Assistant safeties coach

Awards and highlights
- Super Bowl champion (LIV)

Career NFL statistics
- Total tackles: 432
- Sacks: 4.5
- Forced fumbles: 4
- Fumble recoveries: 4
- Pass deflections: 36
- Interceptions: 14
- Defensive touchdowns: 4
- Stats at Pro Football Reference

Daniel Sorensen (born March 5, 1990) is an American former professional football player who was a safety in the National Football League (NFL). He played college football for the BYU Cougars.

== College career ==
Leaving his home state of California, Sorensen became a four-year letterwinner at Brigham Young University. He played in 51 games, recording 211 tackles (122 solo), 1.0 sack (-9 yards), eight interceptions returned for 81 yards and one touchdown, a school-record 23 passes defensed, two forced fumbles and two fumble recoveries. Sorensen was named a team captain and earned first-team Phil Steele All-Independent honors as a senior.

== Professional career ==
On May 11, 2014, the Kansas City Chiefs signed Sorensen to a two-year, $930,000 contract after he went undrafted during the 2014 NFL draft. After going undrafted, Sorensen received calls and offers from multiple teams, but stated he chose to accept the Chiefs' offer because they showed they really wanted him by having head coach Andy Reid call him personally.

External videos
- Sorensen's NFL Combine workout

Pre-draft measurables
Height	Weight	Arm length	Hand span	Wingspan	40-yard dash	10-yard split	20-yard split	20-yard shuttle	Three-cone drill	Vertical jump	Broad jump	Bench press
6 ft 1 3/8 in (1.86 m)	205 lb (93 kg)	31 in (0.79 m)	8 1/2 in (0.22 m)	6 ft 2 in (1.88 m)	4.54 s	1.64 s	2.64 s	3.95 s	6.47 s	32.0 in (0.81 m)	10 ft 2 in (3.10 m)	13 reps
All values from NFL Combine/Pro Day

=== Kansas City Chiefs ===
==== 2014 ====
Throughout training camp, he competed for a roster spot as a backup safety against Sanders Commings, Jerron McMillian, and Malcolm Bronson. He received an opportunity to display his ability after Commings aggravated a foot injury and missed the majority of training camp. He went on to start three preseason games at strong safety after Eric Berry sustained an injury to his heel. Head coach Andy Reid named Sorensen the backup strong safety, behind Eric Berry, to begin the regular season.

He made his professional regular season debut in the Kansas City Chiefs' season-opener against the Tennessee Titans and recorded his first career tackle on Coty Sensabaugh after Sensabaugh recovered a fumble by Titans' kick returner Leon Washington during a Titans' kick return in the second quarter of their 16–10 loss. On September 9, 2014, Sorensen was waived by the Kansas City Chiefs and was signed to the practice squad two days later. It was reported his demotion to practice squad was due to two blunders on special teams that resulted in a failed fake punt and an offsides penalty during their 24–10 victory against the New York Jets. He was promoted back to the active roster on November 1, 2014. On December 28, 2014, Sorensen recorded a season-high two solo tackles in the Chiefs' 19–7 victory against the San Diego Chargers. He finished his rookie season with seven combined tackles (six solo) in nine games and zero starts and was a consistent contributor on special teams.

==== 2015 ====
Sorensen entered training camp competing for a roster spot as a backup safety against Sanders Commings, Kelcie McCray, and Justin Cox. Defensive coordinator Bob Sutton named Sorensen the third free safety on the depth chart to start the 2015 regular season, behind starter Husain Abdullah and Eric Berry. He was also named the starting punt protector by special teams coach Dave Toub.

In Week 10, Sorensen recorded three solo tackles and his first career pass deflection during a 29–13 victory at the Denver Broncos. On December 6, 2015, Sorensen made combined tackles and his first career sack on quarterback Derek Carr in the Chiefs' 34–20 victory at the Oakland Raiders in Week 13. He finished the 2015 season with 23 combined tackles (20 solo), two pass deflections, and a sack in 16 games and zero starts.

The Kansas City Chiefs finished second in the AFC West with an 11–5 record. On January 9, 2016, Sorensen appeared in his first career playoff game as the Chiefs routed the Houston Texans 30–0 in the AFC Wildcard Game. The following week, he made one tackle in during a 27–20 loss at the New England Patriots in the AFC Divisional round.

==== 2016 ====
During OTA's and training camp, Sorensen competed for a role as a backup safety against Jamell Fleming, Eric Murray, Shakiel Randolph, Stevie Brown, and Akeem Davis. Head coach Andy Reid named him the backup strong safety behind Eric Berry to begin the regular season in 2016.

On September 25, 2016, Sorensen recorded two solo tackles, two pass deflections, and made his first career interception off a pass by quarterback Ryan Fitzpatrick during a 24–3 victory against the New York Jets in Week 3. In Week 7, Sorensen made six solo tackles, a pass deflection, a sack, and returned an interception by Drew Brees for a 48-yard touchdown in the Chiefs' 27–21 win against the New Orleans Saints. His score in the first quarter was the first touchdown of his career. The following week, he collected a season-high seven solo tackles during a 30–14 win at the Indianapolis Colts. On December 4, 2016, Sorensen earned his first career start, as a nickelback, in place of an injured Phillip Gaines. He recorded five combined tackles and broke up a pass in a 29–28 victory at the Atlanta Falcons. In Week 14, Sorensen collected a season-high eight combined tackles during a 21–13 victory against the Oakland Raiders. He finished the 2016 season with 63 combined tackles (55 solo), six pass deflections, three interceptions, a sack, and a touchdown in 16 games and one start.

==== 2017 ====
On March 11, 2017, the Kansas City Chiefs signed Sorensen to a four-year, $16 million contract extension that includes a $4 million signing bonus.

He entered training camp slated as a backup safety, but saw minor competition from Eric Murray, Steven Terrell, Leon McQuay III, Marqueston Huff, and Jordan Stern. Defensive coordinator Bob Sutton named Sorensen the backup strong safety, behind Eric Berry, to start the regular season.

Starting strong safety Eric Berry tore his Achilles tendon in the Chiefs' season-opening 42–27 victory at the New England Patriots and missed the rest of the season. Due to Berry's injury, Sorensen became the starter at strong safety. On September 17, 2017, Sorensen made his second career start, but first as a safety, in the Chiefs' 27–20 win against the Philadelphia Eagles and recorded six solo tackles. In Week 11, he recorded six combined tackles, deflected a pass, and intercepted a pass by running back Shane Vereen in a 12–9 loss at the New York Giants. Sorensen made the interception in the first quarter after Vereen attempted a pass on a half back option to tight end Evan Engram. On December 3, 2017, Sorensen collected a season-high 11 combined tackles (six solo) in Kansas City's 38–31 loss at the New York Jets in Week 13. He was inactive for the Chiefs' Week 17 victory at the Denver Broncos. Head coach Andy Reid opted to rest him as the Chiefs had already clinched a playoff berth. He finished the season with 89 combined tackles (67 solo), six pass deflections, 1.5 sacks, and an interception in 15 games and 14 starts.

The Kansas City Chiefs finished the 2017 season atop the AFC West with a 10–6 record. On January 6, 2018, Sorenson started a playoff game for the first time in his four-year career and recorded three combined tackles during a 22–21 loss to the Tennessee Titans.

==== 2018 ====
On September 2, 2018, Sorensen was placed on injured reserve after suffering a knee injury in training camp. He was activated off injured reserve on November 6, 2018. In Week 17, in a 35–3 victory over the Oakland Raiders, he recorded his second career pick-six. In the 2018 season, he appeared in six games and had 26 total tackles (14 solo), one interception, and two passes defended.

==== 2019 ====
In Week 11 against the Los Angeles Chargers on Monday Night Football, Sorensen intercepted a pass thrown by Philip Rivers in the endzone late in the fourth quarter to seal a 24–17 win. He finished the 2019 season with 57 total tackles (44 total), two interceptions, and four passes defended.

In the Divisional Round of the playoffs against the Houston Texans, Sorensen recorded a team high nine tackles and stopped Houston Texans safety Justin Reid short of the first down marker, giving the Chiefs the ball back after the Houston Texans attempted a fake punt. Later in the game, Sorensen forced a fumble on Texans kick returner DeAndre Carter, which was recovered by teammate Darwin Thompson.

In Super Bowl LIV, Sorensen had six tackles and held Pro Bowl tight end George Kittle to only 36 receiving yards in the 31–20 victory over the San Francisco 49ers.

==== 2020 ====
In Week 6 against the Buffalo Bills, Sorensen intercepted a pass thrown by Josh Allen late in the fourth quarter to help secure a 26–17 Chiefs' win. In Week 7 against the Denver Broncos, Sorensen intercepted a pass thrown by Drew Lock and returned it for a 50 yard touchdown during the 43–16 win. In Week 11 against the Las Vegas Raiders on Sunday Night Football, Sorensen intercepted a pass thrown by Derek Carr late in the fourth quarter to secure a 35–31 win for the Chiefs. Overall, Sorensen finished the 2020 season with 91 total tackles, five passes defensed, two forced fumbles, and three interceptions.

==== 2021 ====
Sorensen re-signed with the Chiefs on March 29, 2021. He entered the season as the third safety behind Tyrann Mathieu and Juan Thornhill. He played in 17 games with 7 starts, recording 51 tackles, one sack, eight passes defensed, and two interceptions.

=== New Orleans Saints ===
Sorensen signed with the New Orleans Saints on March 25, 2022. He played in all 17 games with two starts, recording 25 tackles, three passes defensed, and two interceptions.

On September 27, 2023, Sorensen signed with the Saints practice squad. He was released on December 5, 2023, after two games being active with the team.

== NFL career statistics ==
Legend
	Won the Super Bowl
**Bold**	Career high

Year	Team	Games		Tackles				Interceptions				Fumbles			
Year	Team	GP	GS	Cmb	Solo	Ast	Sck	PD	Int	Yds	TD	FF	FR	Yds	TD
2014	KC	9	0	7	6	1	0.0	0	0	0	0	0	0	0	0
2015	KC	16	0	23	20	3	1.0	2	0	0	0	0	0	0	0
2016	KC	16	1	63	55	8	1.0	6	**3**	48	**1**	**2**	**3**	**56**	0
2017	KC	15	**14**	89	67	22	**1.5**	6	1	3	0	0	0	0	0
2018	KC	7	3	26	14	12	0.0	2	1	54	**1**	0	1	0	0
2019	KC	16	3	57	44	13	0.0	4	2	6	0	0	0	0	0
2020	KC	15	11	**91**	**68**	**23**	0.0	5	**3**	67	**1**	**2**	0	0	0
2021	KC	**17**	7	51	40	11	1.0	**8**	2	**75**	**1**	0	0	0	0
2022	NO	**17**	2	25	15	10	0.0	3	2	50	0	0	0	0	0
Career		128	41	432	329	103	4.5	36	14	303	4	4	4	56	0

== Personal life ==
Sorensen was raised by his parents, Kory and Roxann Sorensen, in Grand Terrace, California. He served a 2-year mission for the Church of Jesus Christ of Latter-day Saints in San Jose, Costa Rica. He has a sister named Emily and four brothers named Trevan, Bryan, Cody, and Brad. His older brother, Brad Sorensen, played college football for the 2013 Southern Utah Thunderbirds.
