= Knile Davis =

American football player (born 1991)

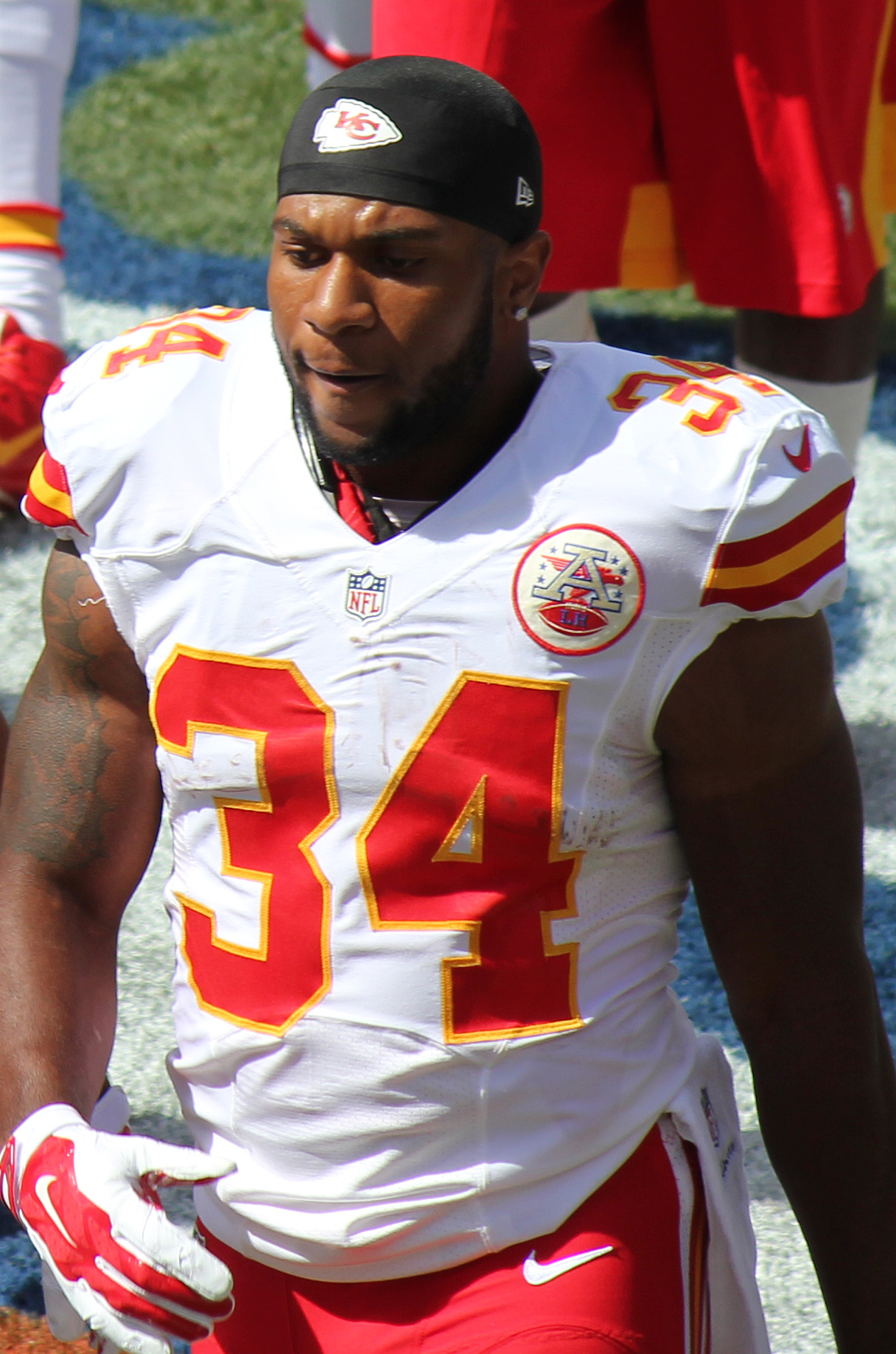
- Davis with the Kansas City Chiefs in 2014

No. 34, 30, 43
- Position: Running back

Personal information
- Born: October 5, 1991 (age 35); Missouri City, Texas, U.S.
- Listed height: 5 ft 11 in (1.80 m)
- Listed weight: 227 lb (103 kg)

Career information
- High school: Thurgood Marshall (Missouri City)
- College: Arkansas (2009–2012)
- NFL draft: 2013: 3rd round, 96th overall pick

Career history
- Kansas City Chiefs (2013–2016); Green Bay Packers (2016); New York Jets (2016); Kansas City Chiefs (2016); Pittsburgh Steelers (2017)*; Chicago Bears (2018)*
- * Offseason or practice squad member only

Awards and highlights
- First-team All-SEC (2010)

Career NFL statistics
- Rushing yards: 805
- Rushing average: 3.2
- Receptions: 34
- Receiving yards: 271
- Return yards: 1,960
- Total touchdowns: 14
- Stats at Pro Football Reference

Knile Rashaad Davis (born October 5, 1991) is an American former professional football player who was a running back in the National Football League (NFL). He played college football for the Arkansas Razorbacks and was selected by the Kansas City Chiefs in the third round of the 2013 NFL draft. He also had brief stints with the Green Bay Packers, New York Jets, Pittsburgh Steelers, and Chicago Bears.

== Early life ==
Davis was born in Missouri City, Texas. He attended Thurgood Marshall High School in Missouri City, where he was a two-sport star in football and track. He played as a running back for the Marshall Buffaloes football team. He was a four-star recruit according to Rivals.com. He was ranked the #3 running back prospect in the state of Texas, behind only Christine Michael and Waymon James.

His high school football career was cut short by injuries. He played only four games in his junior year due to a fractured clavicle, finishing the season with 425 rushing yards and four touchdowns. As a senior, he suffered a broken ankle in the first game of the season, in which he had 33 carries for 278 yards and two touchdowns as well as three receptions for 46 yards. He missed the remainder of his senior season.

In track and field, Davis competed as a sprinter and was a state-qualifier in the 200-meters and relays. He recorded a personal-best time of 21.68 seconds in the 200-meter dash at his district track meet as a junior. He also competed as a member of the Marshall relay squads, posting times of 42.66 seconds in the 4 × 100m, 1:27.91 minutes in the 4 × 200m and 3:15.24 minutes in the 4 × 400m.

== College career ==
Davis attended the University of Arkansas, where he played on the Arkansas Razorbacks football team from 2009 to 2012. As a sophomore in 2010, he rushed for 1,322 yards with 13 touchdowns. He led all SEC running backs in rushing yards, although quarterback Cam Newton of Auburn led the SEC in total rushing yards. Davis was a first-team All-SEC selection by the Associated Press.

Davis was carted off the field from practice on August 11, 2011 with a left ankle injury. The injury was announced by Arkansas the next day as season-ending.

In March 2012, Arkansas head coach Bobby Petrino announced that the 2012 season "will be (Davis's) last year and then he'll come out, go in the draft". As a junior in 2012, he rushed for 377 yards (3.4 avg) and scored two touchdowns. Davis announced his decision to forgo his final year of eligibility and enter the 2013 NFL draft on December 12, 2012.

== Professional career ==
External videos
- Davis's NFL Combine workout

Pre-draft measurables
Height	Weight	Arm length	Hand span	40-yard dash	10-yard split	20-yard split	20-yard shuttle	Three-cone drill	Vertical jump	Broad jump	Bench press
5 ft 11 3/8 in (1.81 m)	227 lb (103 kg)	29 3/4 in (0.76 m)	8 5/8 in (0.22 m)	4.37 s	1.54 s	2.57 s	4.38 s	6.96 s	33.5 in (0.85 m)	10 ft 1 in (3.07 m)	31 reps
All values are from NFL Combine

=== Kansas City Chiefs (first stint) ===
Davis was selected in the third round (96th overall) by the Kansas City Chiefs in the 2013 NFL draft. On May 13, 2013, he signed a contract with the Chiefs.

Davis scored a 108-yard kick return touchdown in Week 13 against the Denver Broncos. The return tied for the longest return in NFL history. He saw limited time as a rookie behind All-Pro Jamaal Charles but made his first career start in Week 17 against the San Diego Chargers, where he rushed for 81 yards and two touchdowns. Despite not starting, Davis was given the bulk of the workload in a playoff loss to the Indianapolis Colts, finishing with 18 carries for 67 yards and a touchdown before suffering a knee injury. Davis finished his rookie year with 242 rushing yards and four touchdowns on 70 carries, and 312 kick return yards and another touchdown on 10 returns.

In 2014, Davis's playing time behind Chiefs running back Jamaal Charles increased and filled in for Charles due to his high ankle sprain. In Davis's lone start of the season, a Week 3 game against the Miami Dolphins, Davis achieved a career-high 132 yards rushing along with a touchdown on 32 carries. Davis followed this up with another 100 yard performance, rushing for 107 yards and a touchdown on 16 carries in a 41-14 blowout of the New England Patriots He finished the season with 134 carries for 463 yards, 16 catches for 147 yards, 29 kick returns for 829 yards, and eight touchdowns in total.

In the Chiefs' wild card playoff game against the Houston Texans, Davis opened the game with a kickoff return of 106 yards for a touchdown.

=== Green Bay Packers ===
On October 18, 2016, Davis was traded to the Green Bay Packers in exchange for a conditional seventh round draft pick in 2018. The trade was made after Packers' running backs Eddie Lacy and James Starks sustained injuries the previous week. He was waived by the Packers on October 31. In two games with the Packers, Davis recorded five yards on five carries.

=== New York Jets ===
Davis was claimed off waivers by the New York Jets on November 1, 2016. However, he was waived by the Jets the following day.

=== Kansas City Chiefs (second stint) ===
On November 5, 2016, Davis was signed by the Chiefs.

=== Pittsburgh Steelers ===
On March 20, 2017, Davis was signed by the Pittsburgh Steelers. He was released by the Steelers as a part of final roster cuts on September 2.

=== Chicago Bears ===
On August 12, 2018, Davis signed with the Chicago Bears. He was released by the Bears prior to the start of the regular season on September 1.

== Career statistics ==
=== NFL ===
Source: NFL.com

Year	Team	G	GS	Rushing					Receiving					Kick return					Fumbles	
Year	Team	G	GS	Att	Yds	Avg	Lng	TD	Rec	Yds	Avg	Lng	TD	Ret	Yds	Avg	Lng	TD	FUM	Lost
Regular season
2013	KC	16	1	70	242	3.5	20	4	11	75	6.8	17	0	10	321	32.1	108	1	3	1
2014	KC	16	1	134	463	3.5	48	6	16	147	9.2	70	1	29	829	28.6	99	1	4	2
2015	KC	14	0	28	72	2.6	10	1	2	24	12.0	12	0	24	603	25.1	54	0	0	0
2016	KC	9	0	13	23	1.8	6	0	3	21	7.0	11	0	9	189	21.0	30	0	0	0
2016	GB	2	0	5	5	1.0	4	0	2	4	2.0	10	0	1	18	18.0	18	0	0	0
Total		57	2	250	805	3.2	48	11	34	271	8.0	70	1	73	1,960	26.8	108	2	7	3
Postseason
2013	KC	1	0	18	67	3.7	13	1	7	33	4.7	13	1	0	0	0.0	0	0	0	0
2015	KC	2	0	10	42	4.2	11	0	2	13	6.5	9	0	4	196	49.0	106	1	1	1
Total		3	0	28	109	3.9	13	1	9	46	5.1	13	1	4	196	49.0	106	1	1	1

=== College ===
Season	Team	GP	Rushing					Receiving				
Season	Team	GP	Att	Yds	Avg	Lng	TD	Rec	Yds	Avg	Lng	TD
2009	Arkansas	12	33	163	4.9	36	4	2	4	2.0	5	0
2010	Arkansas	13	204	1,282	6.3	71	13	19	140	7.4	30	1
2011	Arkansas	0	Did not play due to injury									
2012	Arkansas	10	112	377	3.4	28	2	11	158	14.4	64	1
Total		35	349	1,822	5.0	71	19	32	302	9.4	64	2
