= Laurent Duvernay-Tardif =

Canadian football player (born 1991)

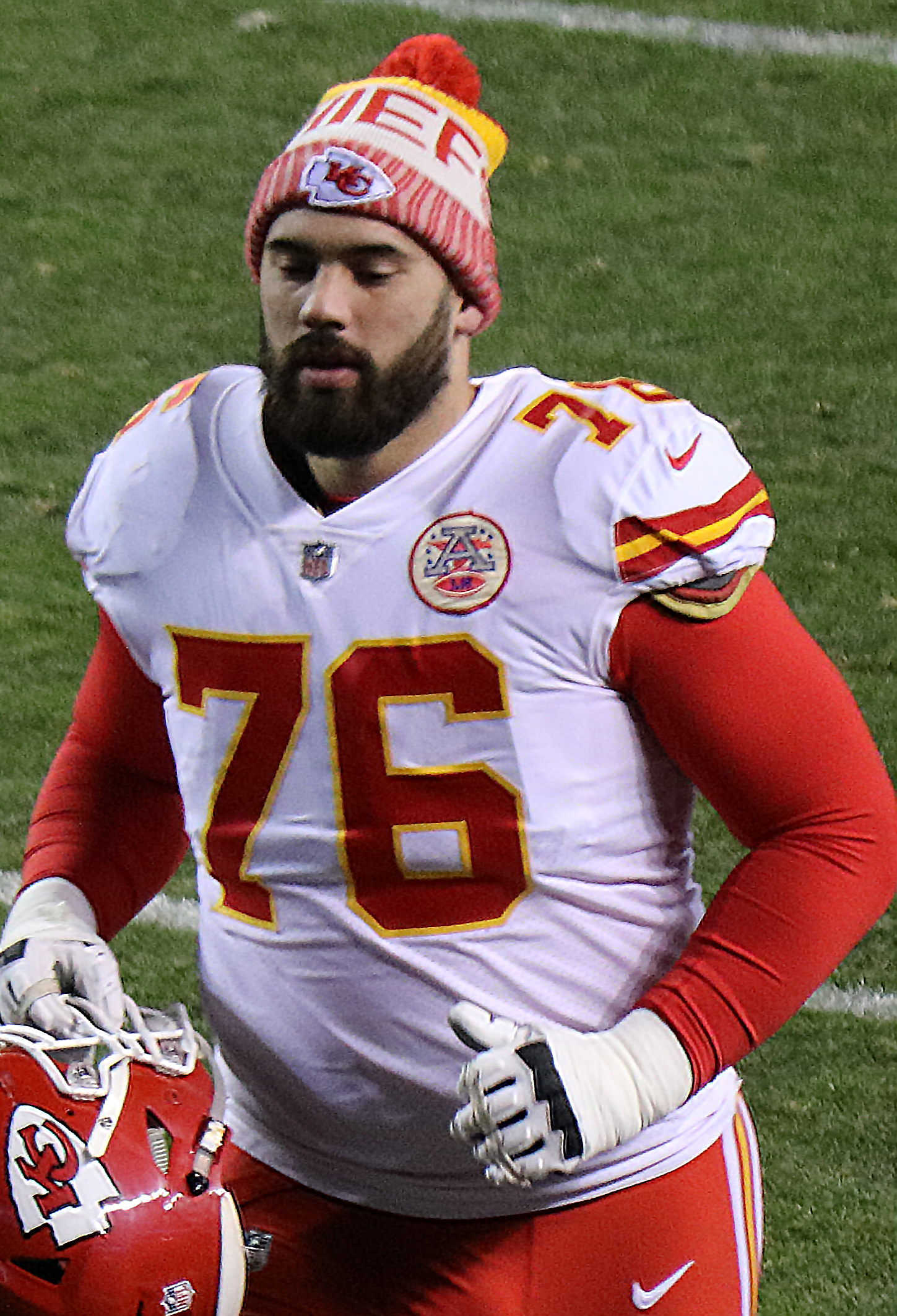
- Duvernay-Tardif with the Kansas City Chiefs in 2017

No. 76, 72
- Position: Guard

Personal information
- Born: February 11, 1991 (age 35); Mont-Saint-Hilaire, Quebec, Canada
- Listed height: 6 ft 5 in (1.96 m)
- Listed weight: 321 lb (146 kg)

Career information
- High school: Collège Saint-Hilaire (Mont-Saint-Hilaire)
- University: McGill
- NFL draft: 2014: 6th round, 200th overall pick
- CFL draft: 2014: 3rd round, 19th overall pick

Career history
- Kansas City Chiefs (2014–2021); New York Jets (2021–2022)

Awards and highlights
- Super Bowl champion (LIV); Lou Marsh Trophy co-winner (2020); Sports Illustrated Sportsperson of the Year (2020); J. P. Metras Trophy (2013); 2× CIS All-Canadian (2012, 2013)

Career NFL statistics
- Games played: 68
- Games started: 64
- Stats at Pro Football Reference

Laurent Duvernay-Tardif CM CQ (French: [lɔʁɑ̃ dyvɛʁne taʁdif]; born February 11, 1991) is a Canadian physician and former professional football player who was a guard in the National Football League (NFL). He played university football and attended medical school at McGill University in Montreal before being selected by the Kansas City Chiefs in the sixth round of the 2014 NFL draft and playing six years on the team. Duvernay-Tardif is one of a small number of NFL players to graduate from medical school. He was made a Knight of the National Order of Quebec in 2019 and enrolled at Harvard University to get a Master of Public Health degree the following year. In December 2024, he was appointed as a Member to the Order of Canada.

Duvernay-Tardif opted out of the 2020 NFL season due to concerns over the COVID-19 pandemic and returned to Canada to work in a care facility. As a result of his efforts on and off the field in 2020, he was named a co-winner of the Lou Marsh Award, given annually to Canada's top athlete, as well as the Sports Illustrated Sportsperson of the Year. He returned to the NFL in 2021 after being traded to the New York Jets for two seasons.

He announced his retirement from the NFL on September 21, 2023.

== Early life ==
Duvernay-Tardif was born in Mont-Saint-Hilaire, Quebec, and grew up in Montreal. He started playing football at the age of 14, until his family went on a year long sailing trip to the Bahamas. After their return, he resumed playing football at age 16 for his high school. His native language is French.

== University career ==
Duvernay-Tardif attended McGill University, where he was member of the McGill Redbirds football team from 2010 to 2013. In his final year, he won the J. P. Metras Trophy, recognizing the best lineman in the Canadian Interuniversity Sport (now U Sports) system, and was named an All-Canadian for the second consecutive season.

First Year (2010): attended training practice at 253lbs and played as defensive line as #92. He dressed for six out of nine games and started three games.

Second Year (2011): attended training practice at 280lbs and played as offensive line as #66. He dressed and started for all nine games at OT, playing two-ways.

Third Year (2012): attended training practice at 305lbs. He dressed and started for all nine games at OT, playing two-ways.

Fourth Year (2013): attending training practice at 315lbs. He dressed and started for all eight games at OT.

He balanced university football with medical school. In a 2014 article in Sports Illustrated, Joan Niesen said that he "was practicing just once a week—and he was still the best college player in Canada." (Note: In American English, "college" is the generic term for postsecondary undergraduate education, regardless of an institution's formal name, or the types of degrees awarded. See College#United States and College#Canada for more details.)

== Professional career ==
=== Pre-draft ===
Duvernay-Tardif played in the 2014 East-West Shrine Game, in which he was part of Jerry Glanville's East team that defeated the West 23–13. Duvernay-Tardif did not receive an invitation to the NFL Scouting Combine. On March 27, 2014, Duvernay-Tardif held a personal pro day in Montreal that was attended by nine NFL teams and four Canadian Football League (CFL) teams.

Pre-draft measurables
Height	Weight	40-yard dash	20-yard shuttle	Three-cone drill	Vertical jump	Broad jump	Bench press
6 ft 5 in (1.96 m)	298 lb (135 kg)	5.08 s	4.59 s	7.30 s	32 in (0.81 m)	9 ft 6 in (2.90 m)	34 reps
All values from Personal Pro Day

=== CFL draft ===
In the CFL's Amateur Scouting Bureau final rankings, Duvernay-Tardif was ranked as the best eligible player for the 2014 CFL draft, a position he held throughout the entirety of the season. However, due to the uncertainty as to his availability as a result of his selection in the NFL Draft, he fell in the draft. He was selected by the Calgary Stampeders in the third round (19th overall). In July 2022, his CFL rights were acquired by the Montreal Alouettes in a trade with the Stampeders.

=== Kansas City Chiefs ===
The Kansas City Chiefs selected Duvernay-Tardif in the sixth round (200th overall) of the 2014 NFL draft. Duvernay-Tardif was the 15th offensive tackle drafted in 2014. Since the inception of the NFL draft, Duvernay-Tardif is the tenth player to be chosen from a Canadian university.

On May 14, 2014, the Kansas City Chiefs signed Duvernay-Tardif to a four-year, $2.34 million contract that includes a signing bonus of $100,300. Throughout training camp, Duvernay-Tardif competed to be a starting guard against Zach Fulton, Jeffrey Linkenbach, Rishaw Johnson, Mike McGlynn, and Rokevious Watkins. Head coach Andy Reid named Duvernay-Tardif the fifth offensive guard on the depth chart to start the regular season, behind Jeff Allen, Fulton, Linkenbach, and McGlynn. On September 13, 2015, Duvernay-Tardif made his first career start for the Chiefs in the season opener against the Houston Texans. He went on to play all 16 games with 13 starts for the Chiefs in 2015. In the 2016 season, Duvernay-Tardif started all 14 games he played in at right guard. On February 28, 2017, the Kansas City Chiefs signed Duvernay-Tardif to a five-year, $42.36 million contract that included $20.20 million guaranteed and a signing bonus of $10 million. During the 2018 season, he started the first five games of the 2018 season at right guard before suffering a fractured fibula in Week 5. He was placed on injured reserve on October 9. Chiefs head coach Andy Reid said he would not be out for the season and would be reactivated at some point later in the season. However, his injury was worse than originally thought, and he didn't start practicing again until the last week of the schedule. He was activated off injured reserve on January 15, 2019, prior to the Chiefs AFC Championship matchup against the New England Patriots. In 2019, Duvernay-Tardif played 14 games. On February 2, 2020, the Chiefs went on to win Super Bowl LIV, their first championship in 50 years.

On April 22, 2020, the Chiefs restructured Duvernay-Tardif's contract to free up salary cap space. On July 24, he announced via his Twitter account he chose to opt-out of playing during the 2020 season as a precaution due to COVID-19. He had been working as an orderly at a long-term care facility in Saint-Jean-sur-Richelieu, Quebec, about 40 minutes away from Montreal, during the pandemic. He was the first NFL player to announce he would not play the season because of COVID-19. Without him, the Chiefs reached Super Bowl LV, but lost 9–31 to the Tampa Bay Buccaneers. His role in fighting COVID off the field in 2020 resulted in Sports Illustrated naming him one of their Sportspeople of the Year. For his efforts both on and off the field in 2020, he was named a co-winner of the Lou Marsh Trophy, which is awarded annually to Canada's top athlete for the year. On July 10, 2021, he was named the recipient of the Muhammad Ali Sports Humanitarian Award at the 2021 ESPYs for his decision to opt out of the 2020 NFL season to help fight the global COVID-19 pandemic.

=== New York Jets ===
Duvernay-Tardif was traded to the New York Jets on November 2, 2021, in exchange for tight end Daniel Brown. On November 18, 2022, after going unsigned all offseason and into the season, Duvernay-Tardif was signed to the Jets practice squad. He was promoted to the active roster on December 7.

On September 21, 2023, Duvernay-Tardif announced his retirement from the NFL.

== Personal life ==
Duvernay-Tardif graduated from McGill University Faculty of Medicine in May 2018 with a Doctor of Medicine and Master of Surgery (M.D., C.M.). He primarily studied during the off-season prior to mandatory off-season workouts. He had the support of the Chiefs coaching staff, especially head coach Andy Reid, whose mother also graduated from McGill's medical school. Following his graduation, he petitioned the NFL to add the title "M.D." on the back of his jersey. The league denied his request, prompting fans and writers to criticize the league's decision. As of 2020, he has not yet completed his postgraduate medical training. Duvernay-Tardif provided the convocation address at McGill's 2020 graduation ceremony. In 2020, he began studying at Harvard University to receive a Master of Public Health.

During the 2018 offseason, Duvernay-Tardif worked as a feature reporter for the Canadian Broadcasting Corporation (CBC) during its coverage of the 2018 Winter Olympics. He is also a member of the NFLPA Health and Safety Committee to protect the health of players.

In 2019, Duvernay-Tardif was made a Knight of the National Order of Quebec. He is the grandson of former Quebec cabinet minister Guy Tardif.

During the COVID-19 pandemic, Duvernay-Tardif wanted to help combat the pandemic and returned to Quebec to work at CHSLD Gertrude-Lafrance, a long-term care facility in Saint-Jean-sur-Richelieu. He was profiled in a TSN documentary, "Front Line", which was later nominated for the best sports feature segment at the 9th Canadian Screen Awards.

He completed his family medicine residency in June 2026. That July, he began a one-year fellowship in emergency medicine (CCFP-EM).
