= Hamza Abdullah =

American football player (born 1983)

No. 21, 41, 23
- Position: Safety

Personal information
- Born: August 20, 1983 (age 43); Los Angeles, California, U.S.
- Listed height: 6 ft 2 in (1.88 m)
- Listed weight: 216 lb (98 kg)

Career information
- High school: Pomona (Pomona, California)
- College: Washington State (2000-2004)
- NFL draft: 2005: 7th round, 231st overall pick

Career history
- Tampa Bay Buccaneers (2005)*; Denver Broncos (2005–2008); Cleveland Browns (2008); Arizona Cardinals (2009–2011)
- * Offseason or practice squad member only

Career NFL statistics
- Total tackles: 88
- Forced fumbles: 3
- Fumble recoveries: 1
- Pass deflections: 5
- Stats at Pro Football Reference

Hamza Muhammad Abdullah (born August 20, 1983) is an American former professional football player who was a safety in the National Football League (NFL). He was selected by the Tampa Bay Buccaneers in the seventh round of the 2005 NFL draft. He played college football for the Washington State Cougars.

Abdullah was also a member of the Denver Broncos, Cleveland Browns, and Arizona Cardinals. He is the older brother of former NFL safety Husain Abdullah.

== Early life ==
Abdullah was raised in Southern California and is one of twelve children in his family. He was raised as a devout Muslim. He attended Pomona High School and played under John Capraro.

== Professional career ==
=== Tampa Bay Buccaneers ===
Abdullah was selected by the Tampa Bay Buccaneers in the seventh round (231st overall) of the 2005 NFL draft. He was waived at the end of training camp and spent the first two months of the 2005 season on the team's practice squad.

=== Denver Broncos ===
On November 1, 2005, Abdullah was signed off the Buccaneers' practice squad to the active roster of the Denver Broncos.

Abdullah spent the 2006 and 2007 seasons with the Broncos, playing primarily on special teams and in a reserve role. He started his first career game on November 11, 2007, against the Kansas City Chiefs, logging his first tackle against return specialist Dante Hall.

A restricted free agent in the 2008 offseason, Abdullah signed his one-year tender offer from the Broncos on April 17. He was released by the Broncos on September 23 after the team signed safety Vernon Fox.

=== Cleveland Browns ===
Abdullah was signed by the Cleveland Browns on October 6, 2008, after the team waived wide receiver Steve Sanders. He was waived during final cuts on September 5.

=== Arizona Cardinals ===
Abdullah was signed by the Arizona Cardinals on December 22, 2009, after linebacker Ali Highsmith was waived.

== Personal life ==
Hamza, together with his brother Husain, chose to take the 2012 NFL season off in order to make a pilgrimage to Mecca.
