= Richard Gordon (American football) =

American football player (born 1987)

No. 82, 81, 89
- Position: Tight end

Personal information
- Born: June 7, 1987 (age 39); Miami, Florida, U.S.
- Listed height: 6 ft 4 in (1.93 m)
- Listed weight: 265 lb (120 kg)

Career information
- High school: Miami Norland (Miami Gardens, Florida)
- College: Miami (FL)
- NFL draft: 2011: 6th round, 181st overall pick

Career history
- Oakland Raiders (2011–2012); Pittsburgh Steelers (2013); Kansas City Chiefs (2013); Tennessee Titans (2014); Kansas City Chiefs (2014); Denver Broncos (2015); Baltimore Ravens (2015); Denver Broncos (2016)*
- * Offseason or practice squad member only

Career NFL statistics
- Receptions: 4
- Receiving yards: 14
- Receiving touchdowns: 1
- Stats at Pro Football Reference

Richard Lee Gordon (born June 7, 1987) is an American former professional football player who was a tight end in the National Football League (NFL). He played college football for the Miami Hurricanes and was selected by the Oakland Raiders in the sixth round of the 2011 NFL draft.

== Professional career ==
Pre-draft measurables
Height	Weight	40-yard dash	10-yard split	20-yard split	20-yard shuttle	Three-cone drill	Vertical jump	Broad jump	Bench press
6 ft 3 1/2 in (1.92 m)	265 lb (120 kg)	4.66 s	1.69 s	2.76 s	4.46 s	7.30 s	32.5 in (0.83 m)	9 ft 1 in (2.77 m)	25 reps
All values from Pro Day

=== Oakland Raiders ===
Gordon was drafted by the Oakland Raiders in the sixth round with the 181st overall pick in the 2011 NFL Draft. He would later sign with the team.

=== Pittsburgh Steelers ===
On October 15, 2013, Gordon was signed by the Pittsburgh Steelers. On December 7, 2013, he was waived.

=== Kansas City Chiefs ===
On December 18, 2013, Gordon was signed by the Kansas City Chiefs. On August 31, 2014, he was waived.

=== Tennessee Titans ===
On October 22, 2014, Gordon was signed by the Tennessee Titans. On November 26, 2014, he was waived.

=== Kansas City Chiefs (second stint) ===
On December 1, 2014, Gordon was signed by the Kansas City Chiefs. On March 13, 2015, he was re-signed. On September 5, 2015, he was placed on injured reserve. On September 14, 2015, he was released from injured reserve.

=== Denver Broncos ===
On October 14, 2015, Gordon was signed by the Denver Broncos. On October 17, 2015, he was released. On October 19, 2015, he was re-signed by the Broncos. On December 1, 2015, he was released once again to make room for Josh Bush.

=== Baltimore Ravens ===
On December 15, 2015, Gordon was signed by the Baltimore Ravens. He was released on December 24, 2015.

=== Return to the Broncos ===
On February 22, 2016, Gordon signed with the Broncos, marking his return with the team. He was released on May 4, 2016.
