= Husain Abdullah =

American football player (born 1985)

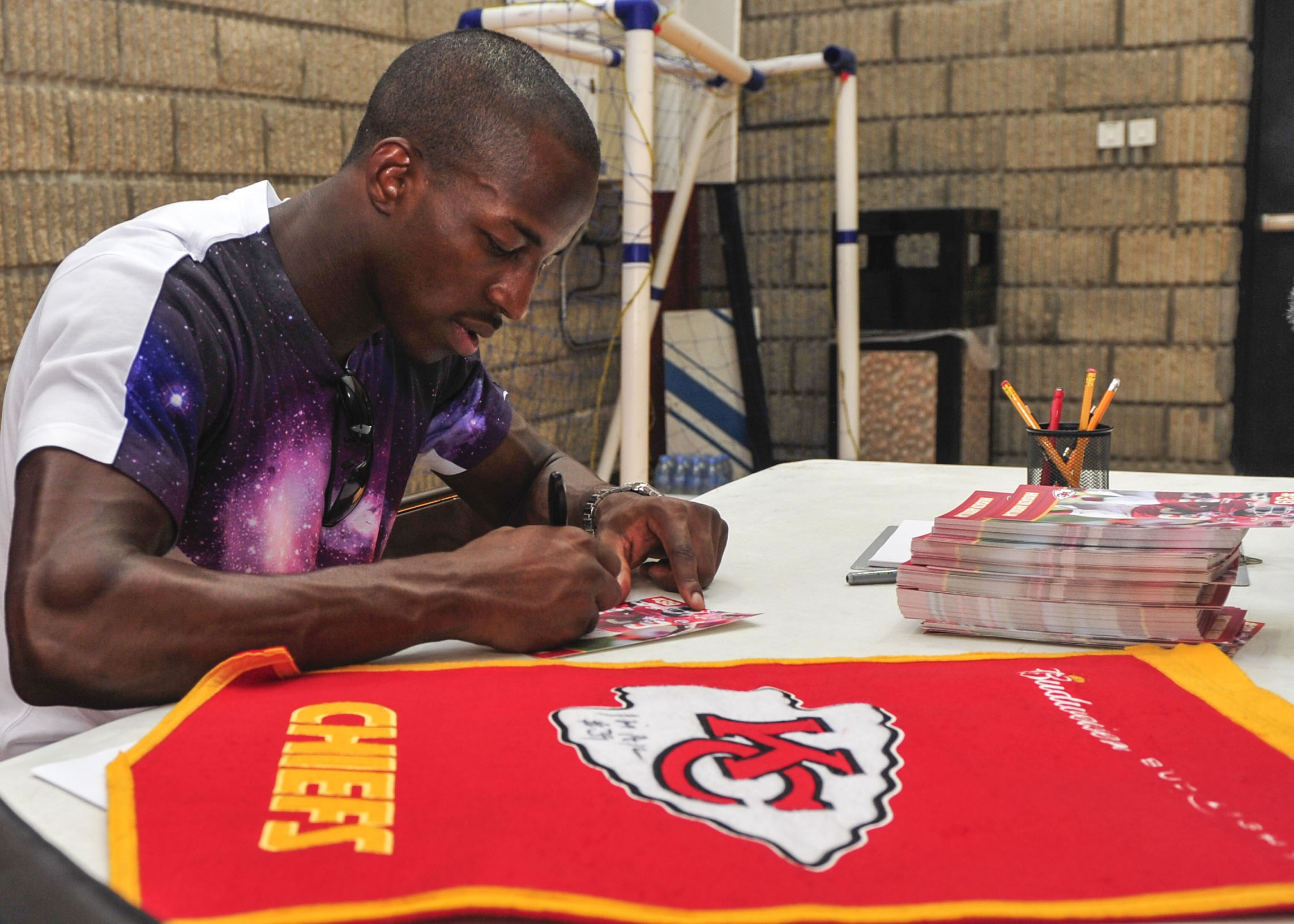
- Abdullah in 2014

No. 39
- Position: Safety

Personal information
- Born: July 27, 1985 (age 41); Los Angeles, California, U.S.
- Listed height: 6 ft 0 in (1.83 m)
- Listed weight: 204 lb (93 kg)

Career information
- High school: Pomona (Pomona, California)
- College: Washington State (2003–2007)
- NFL draft: 2008: undrafted

Career history
- Minnesota Vikings (2008–2011); Kansas City Chiefs (2013–2015)

Career NFL statistics
- Total tackles: 288
- Sacks: 2.5
- Forced recoveries: 1
- Pass deflections: 26
- Interceptions: 6
- Defensive touchdowns: 2
- Stats at Pro Football Reference

Husain Ibn Muhammed Abdullah (born July 27, 1985) is an American former professional football player who was a safety in the National Football League (NFL). He was signed by the Minnesota Vikings of the National Football League (NFL) as an undrafted free agent in 2008 and also played for the Kansas City Chiefs. He retired from the NFL after seven seasons due to multiple concussions sustained during his career and concern for his future health. Abdullah played college football for the Washington State Cougars. He is the younger brother of former NFL safety Hamza Abdullah.

== Early life ==
Abdullah attended Pomona High School and was most well known for his athletics. In high school, he received many honorable awards as he represented his school football team as captain. Abdullah is a defensive back and a contributor to the special teams unit as a kick returner. During Abdullah's sophomore year, he was awarded the team's defensive MVP and was nominated as rookie of the year. During his junior year, Abdullah won the All-Inland Valley award and as a senior, and stood as the number 9 ranked safety in the west coast.

== Professional career ==
Pre-draft measurables
Height	Weight	Arm length	Hand span	40-yard dash	10-yard split	20-yard split	20-yard shuttle	Three-cone drill	Vertical jump	Broad jump	Bench press
5 ft 11 7/8 in (1.83 m)	204 lb (93 kg)	31 3/4 in (0.81 m)	9 1/4 in (0.23 m)	4.63 s	1.56 s	2.63 s	4.12 s	7.07 s	32.5 in (0.83 m)	9 ft 7 in (2.92 m)	16 reps
All values from NFL Combine/Pro Day

=== Minnesota Vikings ===
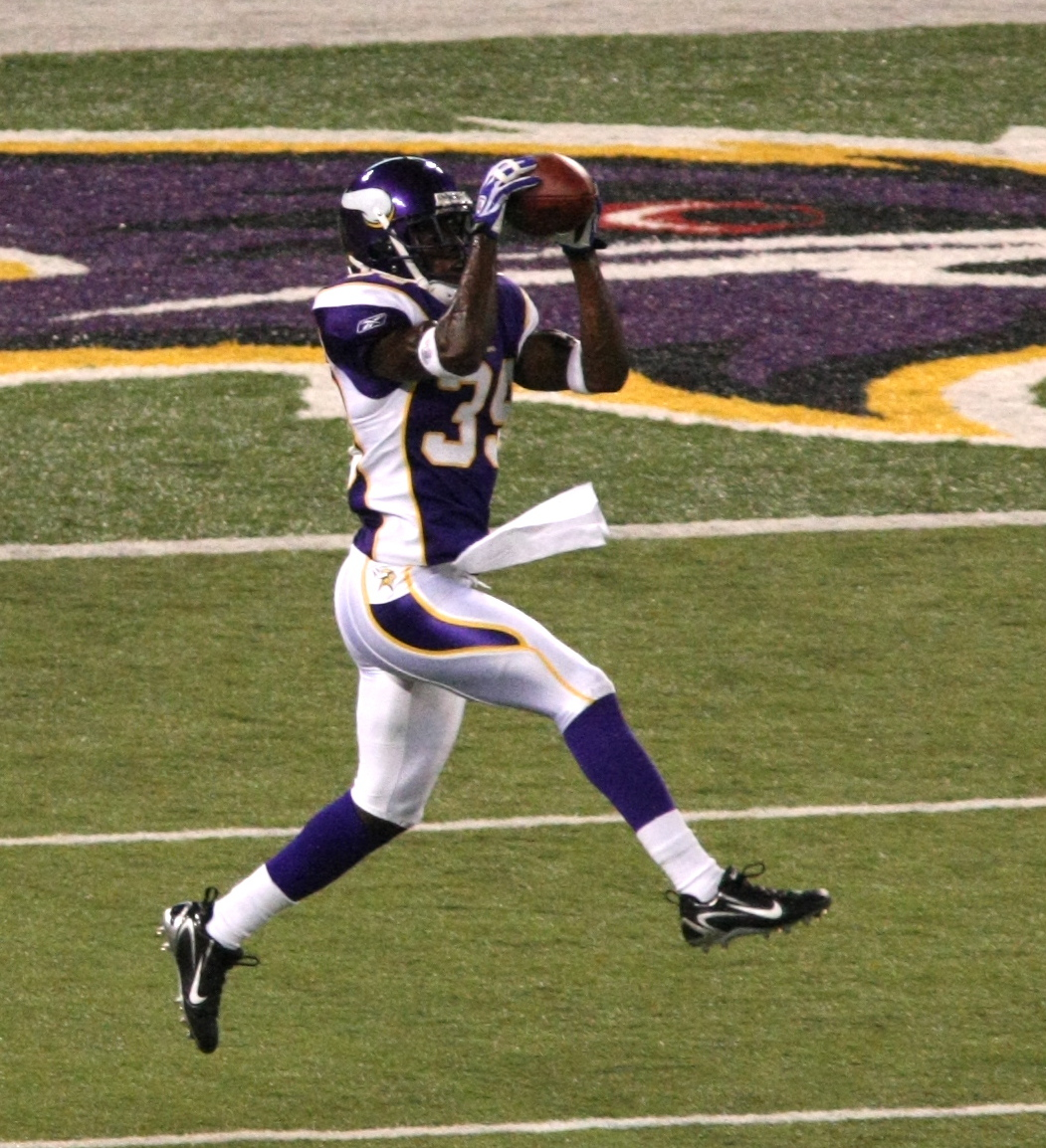
Husain Abdullah intercepting a ball, during his time with the Minnesota Vikings in 2008

Abdullah was an undrafted rookie who later signed with the Minnesota Vikings. He served as a backup from 2008 to 2009. Before the 2010 season he was named the starting strong safety. The competition in the offseason and preseason was thought to be between Tyrell Johnson and Jamarca Sanford, but Abdullah won the job. During the 2011 season, Abdullah became the starting free safety, but a concussion (his fourth in 15 months) ended his season.

=== Kansas City Chiefs ===
After he returned from a year off, Abdullah accepted a one-year contract offer from the Chiefs, and played in all 16 games (starting 2) of the 2013 season; he also started the Chiefs' playoff game against Indianapolis, making 2 interceptions in that game to tie a team playoff record.

An unrestricted free agent after the season, Abdullah re-signed with the Chiefs on March 12, 2014. During a Monday Night Football game on September 29, 2014, against the New England Patriots, Abdullah intercepted a pass, returning it for a touchdown. He was given a 15-yard unsportsmanlike conduct penalty for sliding on his knees, then bowing down and giving praise in Islamic prostration. The next day, the NFL said the penalty was a misapplication of the relevant rule, and should not have been assessed. The penalty created much controversy on social media, including beyond America.

=== Retirement ===
Abdullah retired from football on March 28, 2016, citing concern over the five concussions he had accumulated during his career. He later explained the decision further in an essay submitted to The Players Tribune.

== NFL career statistics ==
Legend
**Bold**	Career high

=== Regular season ===
Year	Team	Games		Tackles					Interceptions					Fumbles			
Year	Team	GP	GS	Cmb	Solo	Ast	Sck	TFL	Int	Yds	TD	Lng	PD	FF	FR	Yds	TD
2008	MIN	**16**	0	20	14	6	0.0	0	0	0	0	0	0	0	0	0	0
2009	MIN	14	0	17	15	2	**1.0**	1	0	0	0	0	1	0	0	0	0
2010	MIN	15	15	**75**	54	**21**	0.0	**3**	**3**	5	0	5	7	0	0	0	0
2011	MIN	9	9	49	44	5	**1.0**	**3**	1	32	0	32	5	0	0	0	0
2013	KAN	**16**	2	27	22	5	0.5	0	1	**44**	**1**	**44**	4	0	**1**	0	0
2014	KAN	**16**	**16**	71	**58**	13	0.0	2	1	39	**1**	39	**8**	0	0	0	0
2015	KAN	11	4	29	24	5	0.0	**3**	0	0	0	0	1	0	0	0	0
Career		97	46	288	231	57	2.5	12	6	120	2	44	26	0	1	0	0

=== Playoffs ===
Year	Team	Games		Tackles					Interceptions					Fumbles			
Year	Team	GP	GS	Cmb	Solo	Ast	Sck	TFL	Int	Yds	TD	Lng	PD	FF	FR	Yds	TD
2008	MIN	1	0	0	0	0	0.0	0	0	0	0	0	0	0	0	0	0
2009	MIN	**2**	0	4	4	0	0.0	0	0	0	0	0	0	0	0	0	0
2013	KAN	1	**1**	**6**	**6**	0	0.0	0	**2**	**5**	0	**4**	**2**	0	0	0	0
2015	KAN	**2**	0	4	1	**3**	0.0	0	0	0	0	0	**2**	0	0	0	0
Career		6	1	14	11	3	0.0	0	2	5	0	4	4	0	0	0	0

== Personal life ==
Abdullah is the son to Yusuf and Sa'eeda Johnwell. He lived in a very large family, one of 12 children. As a practicing Muslim, Abdullah observes fasting in Ramadan—even during the football season. He sat out the 2012 season to make Hajj to Mecca with his brother Hamza Abdullah, who was also in the NFL. He is a member of the Alpha Lambda Mu fraternity, America's first and only Muslim fraternity.
