= Ricky Henry =

American football player (born 1987)

No. 64, 65
- Position: Offensive guard

Personal information
- Born: July 27, 1987 (age 39); Omaha, Nebraska, U.S.
- Listed height: 6 ft 4 in (1.93 m)
- Listed weight: 310 lb (141 kg)

Career information
- High school: Burke (Omaha)
- College: Nebraska
- NFL draft: 2011: undrafted

Career history
- Chicago Bears (2011); Atlanta Falcons (2012); New Orleans Saints (2012); Kansas City Chiefs (2013–2014); Carolina Panthers (2015)*
- * Offseason or practice squad member only

Awards and highlights
- First-team All-Big 12 (2010)

Career NFL statistics
- Games played: 2
- Stats at Pro Football Reference

Ricky Henry (born July 27, 1987) is an American former professional football player who was an offensive guard in the National Football League (NFL). He was signed by the Chicago Bears as an undrafted free agent in 2011. He played college football for the Nebraska Cornhuskers.

Henry has also played for the Atlanta Falcons, New Orleans Saints, and Kansas City Chiefs

== College career ==
Henry was a First-team All-Big 12 after Senior season at the University of Nebraska–Lincoln and also won the Pat Clare Award.

== Professional career ==
=== Chicago Bears ===
On July 26, 2011, Henry signed with the Chicago Bears as an undrafted free agent. On September 3, 2011, he was released. On September 4, he was signed to the practice squad. On November 16, 2011, he was promoted to the active roster. On August 31, 2012, he was released.

=== New Orleans Saints ===
On September 1, 2012, Henry signed with the New Orleans Saints to join their practice squad. On December 15, 2012, he was promoted to the active roster. On August 19, 2013, he was waived by the Saints.

=== Kansas City Chiefs ===
On August 20, 2013, Henry was claimed off waivers by the Kansas City Chiefs. He was released during final preseason roster cut downs on August 30, 2014. The next day he was signed to the Chiefs practice squad.

=== Carolina Panthers ===
On June 17, 2015, Henry was signed by the Carolina Panthers. He was released on September 5, 2015.
