= Jonathon Amaya =

American football player (born 1988)

No. 40, 29
- Position: Safety

Personal information
- Born: November 25, 1988 (age 37); Glendora, California, U.S.
- Listed height: 6 ft 2 in (1.88 m)
- Listed weight: 205 lb (93 kg)

Career information
- High school: Diamond Bar (CA)
- College: Nevada
- NFL draft: 2010: undrafted

Career history
- Miami Dolphins (2010); New Orleans Saints (2011); Miami Dolphins (2012); Arizona Cardinals (2013)*; Kansas City Chiefs (2014)*
- * Offseason or practice squad member only

Career NFL statistics
- Total tackles: 38
- Forced fumbles: 1
- Fumble recoveries: 1
- Stats at Pro Football Reference

Jonathon Daniel Amaya (born November 25, 1988) is an American former professional football player who was a safety in the National Football League (NFL). He played college football for the Nevada Wolfpack. He was signed by the Miami Dolphins as an undrafted free agent in 2010 and also played for the New Orleans Saints.

== Professional career ==
=== Miami Dolphins (first stint) ===
He was signed as an undrafted free agent by the Dolphins on April 30, 2010, but was cut during training camp and added to the practice squad. On October 30, he was signed to the active roster. He made 10 appearances, recording 15 tackles on special teams.

=== New Orleans Saints ===
On July 28, 2011, he was traded to the New Orleans Saints in the Reggie Bush trade. He appeared in all 16 games for the Saints, recording 14 tackles and a forced fumble.

=== Miami Dolphins (second stint) ===
On September 25, 2012, Amaya returned to the Dolphins.

=== Arizona Cardinals ===
On March 27, 2013, Amaya signed a one-year deal with the Arizona Cardinals. He was released on August 30, 2013

=== Kansas City Chiefs ===
Amaya was signed by the Kansas City Chiefs on August 11, 2014. He was released on August 30, 2014.

== Personal life ==
In November 2012, Amaya was arrested in Miami Beach for allegedly assaulting a cab driver following an argument. On January 11, 2013, Miami-Dade prosecutors notified the court that they would not proceed with the case. The charge of battery was dropped, clearing Amaya's name. Amaya had maintained his innocence the entire time.
