= Justin Rogers (cornerback) =

American football player (born 1988)

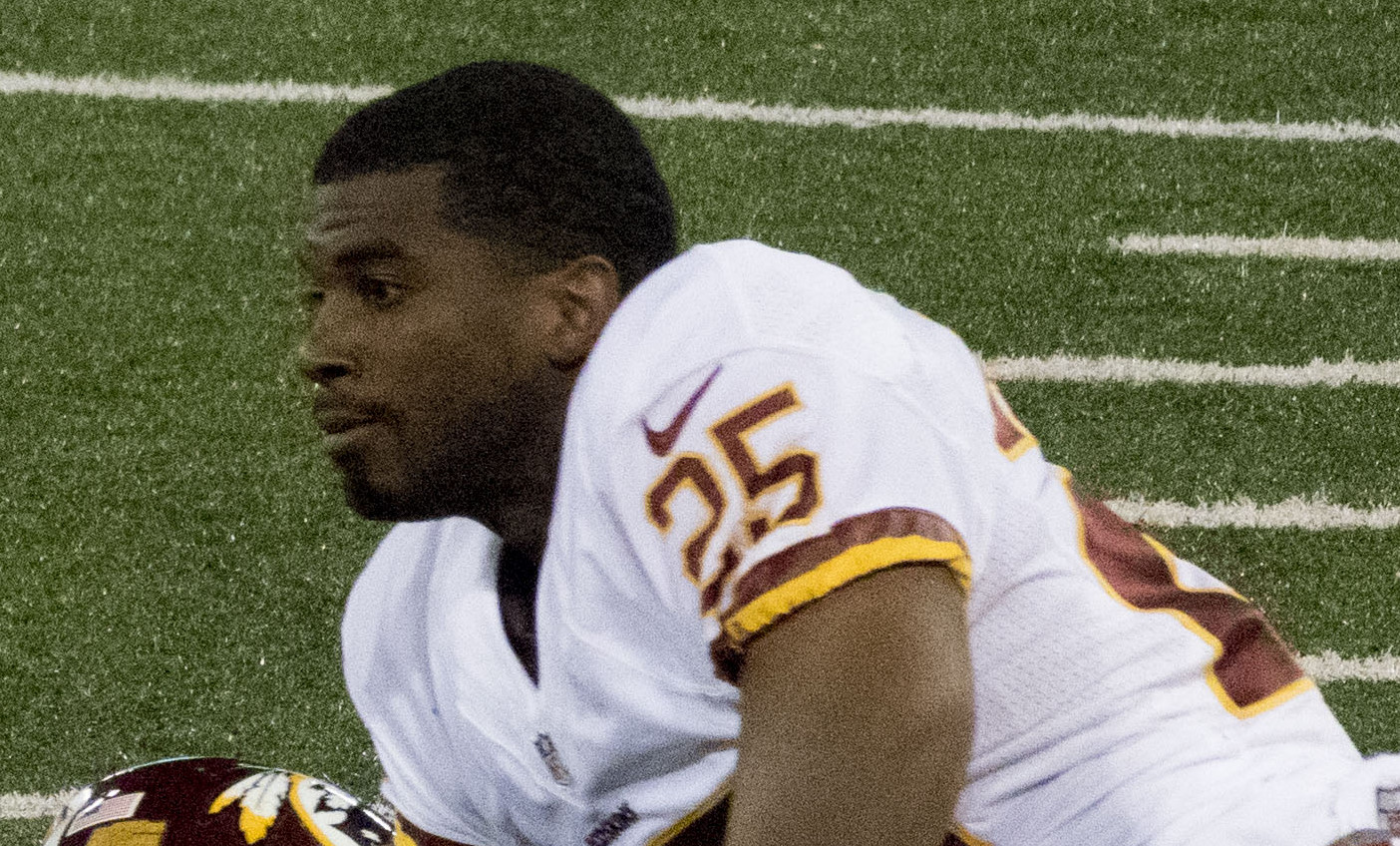
- Rogers with the Washington Redskins in 2015

No. 20, 25, 26, 35, 38
- Position: Cornerback

Personal information
- Born: January 16, 1988 (age 38); Baton Rouge, Louisiana, U.S.
- Listed height: 5 ft 11 in (1.80 m)
- Listed weight: 185 lb (84 kg)

Career information
- High school: Redemptorist (Baton Rouge)
- College: Richmond
- NFL draft: 2011: 7th round, 206th overall pick

Career history
- Buffalo Bills (2011–2013); Houston Texans (2013); Miami Dolphins (2013); Kansas City Chiefs (2014)*; Washington Redskins (2014–2015); Hamilton Tiger-Cats (2017)
- * Offseason or practice squad member only

Career NFL statistics
- Total tackles: 81
- Pass deflections: 14
- Interceptions: 3
- Stats at Pro Football Reference
- Stats at CFL.ca

Justin Rogers (born January 16, 1988) is an American former professional football player who was a cornerback in the National Football League (NFL) and Canadian Football League (CFL). He was selected by the Buffalo Bills in the seventh round of the 2011 NFL draft. He played college football for the Richmond Spiders. He was also a member of the Houston Texans, Miami Dolphins, Kansas City Chiefs, Washington Redskins and Hamilton Tiger-Cats.

== Professional career ==
Pre-draft measurables
Height	Weight	Arm length	Hand span	Wingspan	40-yard dash	10-yard split	20-yard split	20-yard shuttle	Three-cone drill	Vertical jump	Broad jump	Bench press
5 ft 10 1/2 in (1.79 m)	180 lb (82 kg)	31 3/8 in (0.80 m)	8 1/4 in (0.21 m)	6 ft 2 7/8 in (1.90 m)	4.40 s	1.51 s	2.57 s	4.20 s	6.69 s	33.0 in (0.84 m)	9 ft 6 in (2.90 m)	14 reps
All values from NFL Combine/Pro Day

=== Buffalo Bills ===
Rogers was selected by the Buffalo Bills in the seventh round of the 2011 NFL draft with the 206th overall pick. He had three interceptions in his three years with the Bills. He was released on November 19, 2013.

=== Houston Texans ===
Texans signed Rogers on November 20, 2013. He was released on November 29, 2013.

=== Miami Dolphins ===
The Miami Dolphins signed Rogers on December 10, 2013. He was waived on December 19, 2013.

=== Kansas City Chiefs ===
Rogers signed with the Kansas City Chiefs on June 5, 2014. He was released on August 30, 2014.

=== Washington Redskins ===
Rogers signed with the Washington Redskins on December 10, 2014.

On September 29, 2015, he was placed on injured reserve due to a plantar fascia tear in his right foot.

On October 8, 2015, he was cut from the team.

=== Hamilton Tiger-Cats ===
Rogers played in six games, all starts, for the Hamilton Tiger-Cats in 2017.
