= Zach Fulton =

American football player (born 1991)

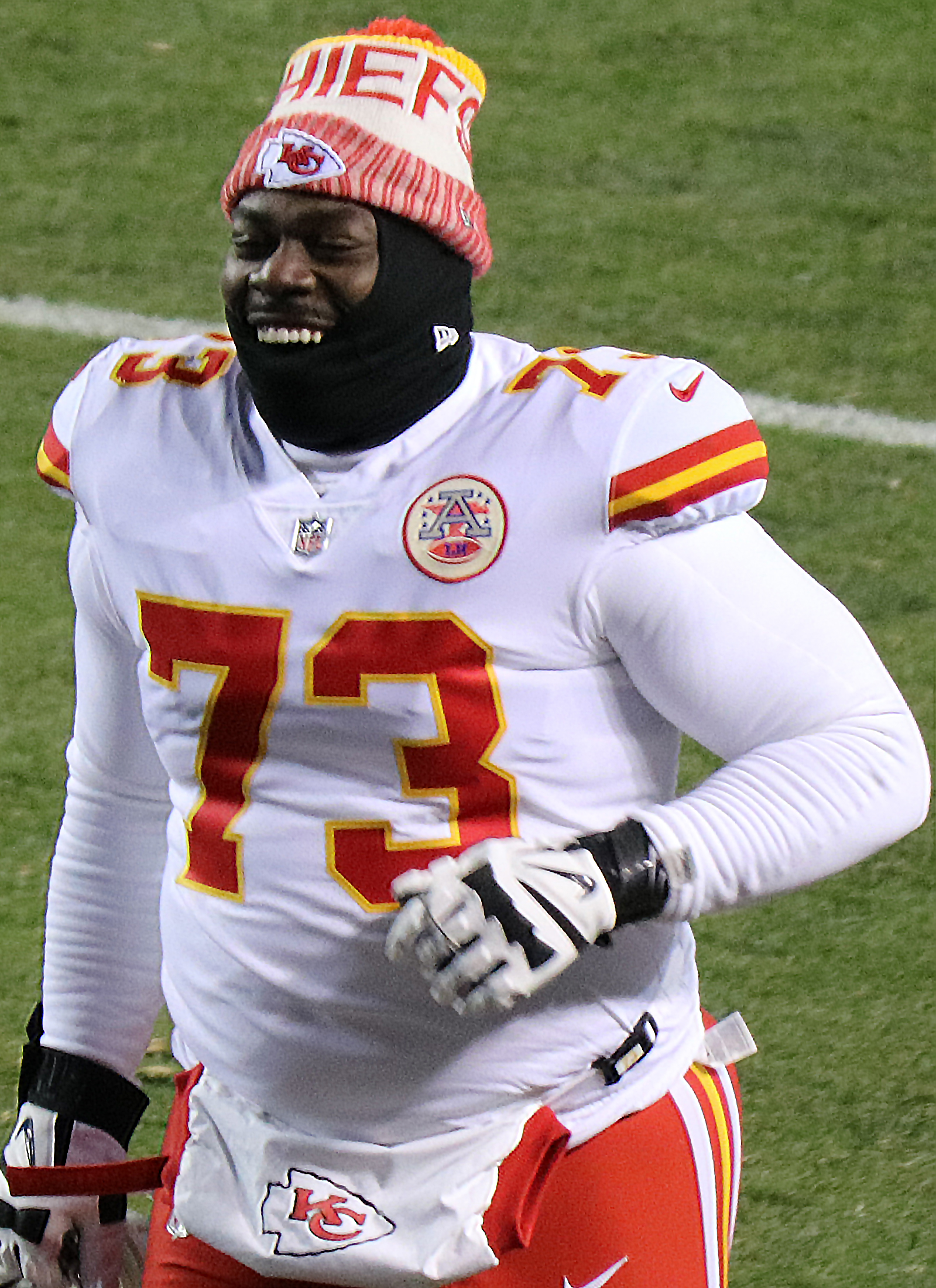
- Fulton with the Kansas City Chiefs in 2017

No. 73
- Position: Guard

Personal information
- Born: September 23, 1991 (age 35); Detroit, Michigan, U.S.
- Listed height: 6 ft 5 in (1.96 m)
- Listed weight: 321 lb (146 kg)

Career information
- High school: Homewood-Flossmoor (Flossmoor, Illinois)
- College: Tennessee
- NFL draft: 2014: 6th round, 193rd overall pick

Career history
- Kansas City Chiefs (2014–2017); Houston Texans (2018–2020); New York Giants (2021)*
- * Offseason or practice squad member only

Career NFL statistics
- Games played: 107
- Games started: 90
- Stats at Pro Football Reference

Zachery Quinn Fulton (born September 23, 1991) is an American former professional football player who was a guard in the National Football League (NFL). He played college football for the Tennessee Volunteers and was selected by the Kansas City Chiefs in the sixth round of the 2014 NFL draft. He also played for the Houston Texans.

== College career ==
Fulton played college football at the University of Tennessee from 2010 to 2013 under head coaches Derek Dooley and Butch Jones. In his last three seasons, he started all of the games for the Volunteers.

== Professional career ==
Pre-draft measurables
Height	Weight	Arm length	Hand span	40-yard dash	20-yard shuttle	Three-cone drill	Vertical jump	Broad jump	Bench press
6 ft 4 5/8 in (1.95 m)	316 lb (143 kg)	33 1/4 in (0.84 m)	10 1/4 in (0.26 m)	5.16 s	5.16 s	7.87 s	24.5 in (0.62 m)	8 ft 2 in (2.49 m)	25 reps
All values from NFL Combine

=== Kansas City Chiefs ===
Fulton was selected by the Kansas City Chiefs in the sixth round, 193rd overall, in the 2014 NFL draft. He won a starting spot during the Chiefs' training camp in August 2014, and made his NFL debut in the Chiefs' season-opening loss to Tennessee on September 7, 2014. He was the Chiefs' first sixth-round pick to start in the opening game of his rookie season in 30 years. He finished his rookie season starting all 16 games for the Chiefs. He played in all 16 games and started six in the 2015 season. He appeared in all 16 games and started 12 in the 2016 season.

In 2017, Fulton played in 15 games, starting 12 at center and at both guard spots throughout the season following injuries to starters Mitch Morse, Laurent Duvernay-Tardif and Bryan Witzmann.

=== Houston Texans ===
On March 15, 2018, the Houston Texans signed Fulton to a four-year, $28 million contract that includes $13 million guaranteed. He was named the starting right guard to start the season, and started 13 games there. In 2019, Fulton started 15 games at right guard, and started all 16 at right guard in 2020.

Fulton was released by the Texans on March 17, 2021.

=== New York Giants ===
Fulton signed with the New York Giants on March 25, 2021.

Fulton announced his retirement from football on August 6, 2021.
