= Rishaw Johnson =

American football player (born 1989)

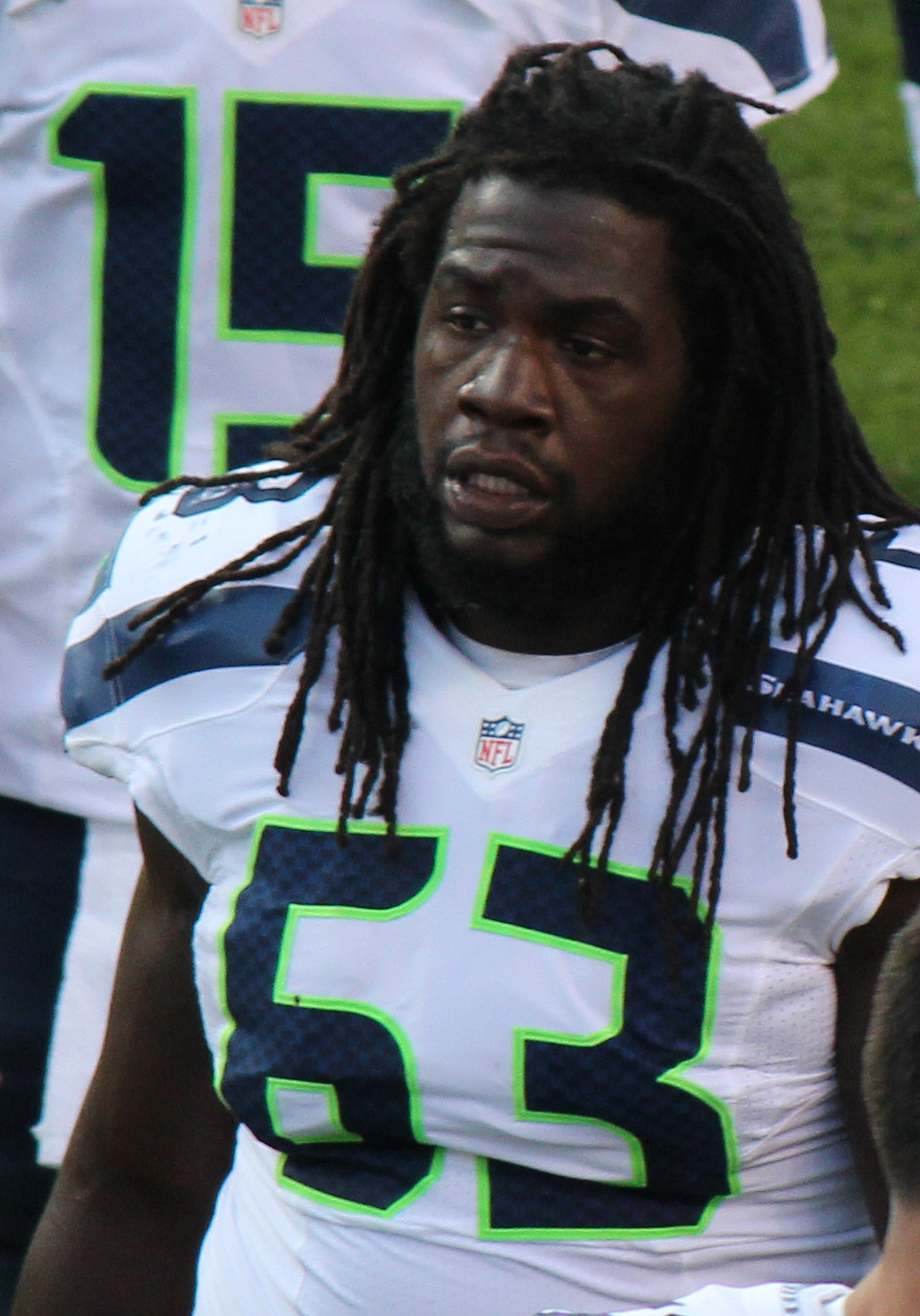
- Johnson with the Seattle Seahawks in 2012

Current position
- Title: Tight ends coach
- Team: McNeese State
- Conference: Southland

Biographical details
- Born: February 23, 1989 (age 37); New Orleans, Louisiana, U.S.

Playing career
- 2003-2004: St. Augustine (New Orleans, LA)
- 2005: Southern Lab (Baton Rouge, LA)
- 2006: Hammond (Hammond, LA)
- 2008–2010: Ole Miss
- 2011: California (PA)
- (2012): Seattle Seahawks
- (2013): Kansas City Chiefs
- (2014): Tampa Bay Buccaneers
- (2014): Dallas Cowboys*
- (2014): Green Bay Packers*
- (2014): New York Giants*
- (2014): Washington Redskins
- (2015): Toronto Argonauts
- Position: Offensive lineman

Coaching career (HC unless noted)
- 2016–2017: UTSA (GA)
- 2018: UTSA (Offensive quality control)
- 2019: UTSA (RB)
- 2020–present: McNeese State (TE)

Accomplishments and honors

Championships
- 2× Cotton Bowl champion (2008–2009)

Awards
- PSAC First-team All-Conference (2011); D1Football.com First-team All-American (2011); Dakotatronics Second-team All-Region (2011); 2012 East-West Shrine Game appearance 2012 Senior Bowl appearance

Rishaw Kali Johnson (born February 23, 1989) is an American former professional football offensive guard that is currently the tight ends coach at McNeese State. He attended California University of Pennsylvania in 2011, having transferred there from the University of Mississippi, where he played from 2008 to 2010. He signed as an undrafted free agent with the Seattle Seahawks in 2012.

== Early life ==
A native of New Orleans, Louisiana, Johnson attended St. Augustine High School in his freshman and sophomore year, until Hurricane Katrina devastated the city in 2005. He was forced to move to Baton Rouge, Louisiana, and played his junior season at Southern Laboratory School. He completed his high school career at Hammond High School in Hammond, Louisiana, where he was regarded as a four-star offensive line prospect. He chose Ole Miss over Florida State and Southern Miss.

== College career ==
After redshirting his initial year at Ole Miss, Johnson saw action in five games as a redshirt freshman in 2008. In 2009, he appeared in five games, with four starts, at right guard. After starting the season opener of his junior season, Johnson was dismissed from Ole Miss for "violating team rules". He then transferred to California University of Pennsylvania, where he was a Division II All-American selection in 2011. Johnson played in the 2012 Senior Bowl and the 2012 East–West Shrine Game.

== Professional career ==
=== 2012 NFL draft ===
Pre-draft measurables
Height	Weight	Arm length	Hand span	40-yard dash	20-yard shuttle	Three-cone drill	Vertical jump	Broad jump	Bench press
6 ft 3 3/8 in (1.91 m)	313 lb (142 kg)	35 1/4 in (0.90 m)	10 1/4 in (0.26 m)	5.24 s	4.53 s	7.87 s	31 1/2 in (0.80 m)	9 ft 0 in (2.74 m)	22 reps
All values from NFL Combine.

=== Seattle Seahawks ===
Johnson was not drafted, and was signed by the Seattle Seahawks after the draft, and spent time on the practice squad. In late September, Johnson was brought in by the Chicago Bears for a workout, but was not signed.

In December 2012, Johnson was promoted from the Seahawks practice squad to their active roster.

=== Kansas City Chiefs ===
On September 3, 2013, Johnson was signed to the Kansas City Chiefs practice squad. The Chiefs promoted him to the active roster on September 24.

=== Tampa Bay Buccaneers ===
On August 21, 2014, Johnson was traded to the Tampa Bay Buccaneers for safety Kelcie McCray. Johnson was waived on September 25, 2014, after the team promoted Mike Kafka off the practice squad.

=== New York Giants ===
The New York Giants signed Johnson to their practice squad on November 25, 2014.

=== Washington Redskins ===
On December 23, 2014, the Washington Redskins signed Johnson to their active roster from the Giants' practice squad.

On May 4, 2015, he was waived by the Redskins.
