= 2014 New England Patriots season =

55th season in franchise history; fourth Super Bowl win

- Owner: Robert Kraft
- Head coach: Bill Belichick
- Offensive coordinator: Josh McDaniels
- Defensive coordinator: Matt Patricia
- Home stadium: Gillette Stadium

Results
- Record: 12–4
- Division place: 1st AFC East
- Playoffs: Won Divisional Playoffs (vs. Ravens) 35–31; Won AFC Championship (vs. Colts) 45–7; Won Super Bowl XLIX (vs. Seahawks) 28–24
- All-Pros: 3: TE Rob Gronkowski (1st team); CB Darrelle Revis (1st team); K Stephen Gostkowski (2nd team)
- Pro Bowlers: 5: QB Tom Brady; TE Rob Gronkowski; CB Darrelle Revis; K Stephen Gostkowski; ST Matthew Slater

Uniform
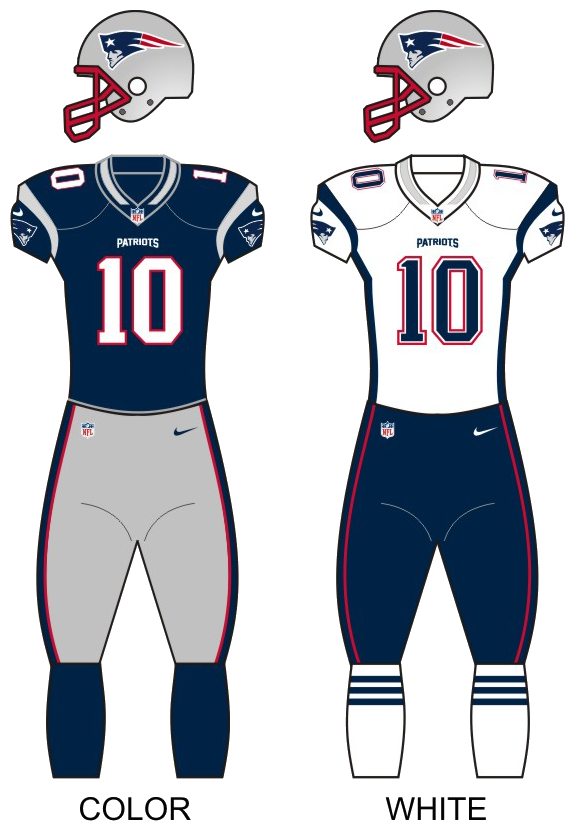

The 2014 season was the New England Patriots' 45th in the National Football League (NFL), their 55th overall, and their 15th under head coach Bill Belichick.

The 2014 season would mark the tenth anniversary of the Patriots' third and then most recent Super Bowl win, when they defeated the Philadelphia Eagles in Super Bowl XXXIX. Despite their championship drought, the Patriots remained a dominant NFL dynasty throughout the 2000s and early 2010s. They qualified for the playoffs nine times (missing only the 2008 postseason despite finishing 11–5), reached the AFC Championship five times, appeared in two Super Bowls, and, in the eyes of many, solidified Tom Brady's status as one of the greatest quarterbacks of all time. In 2007, the Patriots completed just the second undefeated regular season in the history of the modern NFL (the first being their division rival Miami Dolphins in 1972), as well as the first since the league expanded its seasons to sixteen games (though only the 1972 Dolphins were able to win the Super Bowl). The team's continued success over more than a decade drew a great deal of intrigue toward the ball club, and with it, constant media scrutiny. Despite several setbacks throughout the season, including a blowout loss to the Kansas City Chiefs in week four and the highly publicized Deflategate scandal, the Patriots rode the momentum of a 10–2 finish to a Super Bowl championship.

The Patriots finished 12–4 for the third straight year, winning their sixth straight AFC East title, as well as the top-overall seed and home field advantage for the AFC playoffs. With their seeding, New England was awarded a first-round bye in the playoffs for the fifth season in a row, the first such occurrence for any team since the league switched to a 12-team playoff format in 1990 (surpassing the 1992–95 Dallas Cowboys). They finished fourth in the NFL in scoring (468 points) and eighth in points allowed (313), and first in point differential (with an average margin of victory of 9.7 points).

The Patriots defeated the Baltimore Ravens 35–31 in the divisional round of the playoffs, advancing to their fourth straight AFC Championship Game. There, they defeated the Indianapolis Colts 45–7 to advance to their 8th Super Bowl, their 6th under Bill Belichick. On February 1, 2015, the Patriots played the Seattle Seahawks in Super Bowl XLIX. After allowing the Seahawks to tie the game 14–14 at halftime and falling behind ten points in the third quarter, the Patriots rallied in the final quarter of the game to secure a 28–24 victory, and with it, the franchise's fourth championship and first title since the 2004 season 10 years prior.

This would be the last season until 2020 (and the last one of the 2010s) in which the Patriots did not face the Pittsburgh Steelers.

== Roster changes ==
=== Free agency ===
- Notable Departures: Aqib Talib (to Denver Broncos), Brandon Spikes (to Buffalo Bills), Dane Fletcher (to Tampa Bay Buccaneers), LeGarrette Blount (returned the same year, to Pittsburgh Steelers) Logan Mankins (to Tampa Bay Buccaneers)
- Notable Re-signings: Michael Hoomanawanui, Julian Edelman, Danny Aiken
- Notable Arrivals: Darrelle Revis (from Tampa Bay Buccaneers), Brandon Browner (from Seattle Seahawks), Brandon LaFell (from Carolina Panthers), Patrick Chung (from Philadelphia Eagles)

=== Draft ===
2014 New England Patriots draft
Round	Pick	Player	Position	College	Notes
1	29	Dominique Easley	DT	Florida	
2	62	Jimmy Garoppolo	QB	Eastern Illinois	
4	105	Bryan Stork	C	Florida St	Pick from JAX
4	130	James White	RB	Wisconsin	
4	140	Cameron Fleming	OT	Stanford	Compensatory
6	179	Jon Halapio	OG	Florida	Pick from JAX
6	198	Zach Moore	DE	Concordia-St. Paul	Pick from PHI
6	206	Jemea Thomas	CB	Georgia Tech	
7	244	Jeremy Gallon	WR	Michigan	
Made roster † Pro Football Hall of Fame * Made at least one Pro Bowl during career

Draft trades

- The Patriots traded their third-round selection (No. 93 overall) to the Jacksonville Jaguars in exchange for the Jaguars' fourth- and sixth-round selections (Nos. 105 and 179 overall).
- The Patriots traded their fifth-round selection (No. 169 overall) to the Philadelphia Eagles in exchange for the Eagles' sixth-round selection (No. 198 overall) and defensive tackle Isaac Sopoaga.

=== Undrafted free agents ===
All undrafted free agents were signed just after the 2014 NFL draft concluded on April 30, 2014.

Position	Player	College
CB	Malcolm Butler	West Alabama

Made regular season roster

== Staff ==
2014 New England Patriots staff
Front office: Chairman/CEO – Robert Kraft; President – Jonathan Kraft; Director of football operations/general manager – Bill Belichick; Director of player personnel – Nick Caserio; Director of college scouting – Monti Ossenfort; Director of pro scouting – Bob Quinn; Football research director – Ernie Adams; Assistant to the coaching staff – Michael Lombardi; Head coaches: Head coach – Bill Belichick; Offensive coaches: Offensive coordinator/quarterbacks – Josh McDaniels; Running backs – Ivan Fears; Wide receivers – Chad O'Shea; Tight ends – Brian Daboll; Offensive line – Dave DeGuglielmo; Coaching assistant - Jerry Schuplinski	Defensive coaches: Defensive coordinator – Matt Patricia; Linebackers – Patrick Graham; Cornerbacks – Josh Boyer; Safeties – Brian Flores; Defensive assistant – Brendan Daly; Coaching assistant - Steve Belichick; Special teams coaches: Special teams – Scott O'Brien; Assistant special teams – Joe Judge; Strength and conditioning: Strength and conditioning – Harold Nash; Assistant strength and conditioning – Moses Cabrera

== Final roster ==
2014 New England Patriots roster
Quarterbacks (QB): 12 Tom Brady; 10 Jimmy Garoppolo; Running backs (RB): 29 LeGarrette Blount; 38 Brandon Bolden; 46 James Develin FB; 35 Jonas Gray; 34 Shane Vereen; 28 James White; Wide receivers (WR): 80 Danny Amendola KR; 82 Josh Boyce; 11 Julian Edelman PR; 19 Brandon LaFell; 18 Matthew Slater; 84 Brian Tyms; Tight ends (TE): 87 Rob Gronkowski; 47 Michael Hoomanawanui; 81 Tim Wright	Offensive linemen (OL): 61 Marcus Cannon G/T; 63 Dan Connolly G/C; 65 Jordan Devey G/T; 71 Cameron Fleming T/G; 67 Josh Kline G; 77 Nate Solder T; 66 Bryan Stork C; 76 Sebastian Vollmer T; 62 Ryan Wendell G/C; Defensive linemen (DL): 97 Alan Branch DT; 95 Chandler Jones DE; 94 Chris Jones DT; 90 Zach Moore DE; 50 Rob Ninkovich DE; 96 Sealver Siliga DT/DE; 72 Joe Vellano DT; 75 Vince Wilfork NT	Linebackers (LB): 55 Akeem Ayers; 52 Jonathan Casillas OLB; 91 Jamie Collins OLB; 58 Darius Fleming OLB; 54 Dont'a Hightower OLB; 59 Chris White MLB; Defensive backs (DB): 25 Kyle Arrington CB; 39 Brandon Browner CB; 21 Malcolm Butler; 23 Patrick Chung SS; 43 Nate Ebner FS; 30 Duron Harmon SS; 32 Devin McCourty FS; 24 Darrelle Revis CB; 26 Logan Ryan CB; 27 Tavon Wilson FS; Special teams (ST): 48 Danny Aiken LS; 6 Ryan Allen P; 3 Stephen Gostkowski K	Practice squad: 64 Chris Barker G; 92 Jake Bequette DE; 8 Garrett Gilbert QB; 31 Justin Green CB; 68 Caylin Hauptmann T; 16 Jonathan Krause WR; 53 Eric Martin DE; 41 Dax Swanson CB; 44 Deontae Skinner LB; Reserve: 99 Michael Buchanan DE (IR); 37 Alfonzo Dennard CB (IR); 17 Aaron Dobson WR (IR); 74 Dominique Easley DT (IR); 31 Tyler Gaffney RB (IR); 45 Cameron Gordon OLB (IR); 51 Jerod Mayo MLB (IR); 52 James Morris MLB (IR); 16 Greg Orton WR (IR); 22 Stevan Ridley RB (IR); Rookies in italics 53 active, 10 reserve, 9 practice squad

== Schedule ==
=== Preseason ===
Week	Date	Opponent	Result	Record	Game site	NFL.com recap
1	August 7	at Washington Redskins	**L** 6–23	0–1	FedExField	Recap
2	August 15	Philadelphia Eagles	**W** 42–35	1–1	Gillette Stadium	Recap
3	August 22	Carolina Panthers	**W** 30–7	2–1	Gillette Stadium	Recap
4	August 28	at New York Giants	**L** 13–16	2–2	MetLife Stadium	Recap

=== Regular season ===
Week	Date	Opponent	Results		Game site	NFL.com recap
Week	Date	Opponent	Score	Record	Game site	NFL.com recap
1	September 7	at **Miami Dolphins**	**L** 20–33	0–1	Hard Rock Stadium	Recap
2	September 14	at Minnesota Vikings	**W** 30–7	1–1	TCF Bank Stadium	Recap
3	September 21	Oakland Raiders	**W** 16–9	2–1	Gillette Stadium	Recap
4	September 29	at Kansas City Chiefs	**L** 14–41	2–2	Arrowhead Stadium	Recap
5	October 5	Cincinnati Bengals	**W** 43–17	3–2	Gillette Stadium	Recap
6	October 12	at **Buffalo Bills**	**W** 37–22	4–2	Ralph Wilson Stadium	Recap
7	October 16	**New York Jets**	**W** 27–25	5–2	Gillette Stadium	Recap
8	October 26	Chicago Bears	**W** 51–23	6–2	Gillette Stadium	Recap
9	November 2	Denver Broncos	**W** 43–21	7–2	Gillette Stadium	Recap
10	Bye					
11	November 16	at Indianapolis Colts	**W** 42–20	8–2	Lucas Oil Stadium	Recap
12	November 23	Detroit Lions	**W** 34–9	9–2	Gillette Stadium	Recap
13	November 30	at Green Bay Packers	**L** 21–26	9–3	Lambeau Field	Recap
14	December 7	at San Diego Chargers	**W** 23–14	10–3	Qualcomm Stadium	Recap
15	December 14	**Miami Dolphins**	**W** 41–13	11–3	Gillette Stadium	Recap
16	December 21	at **New York Jets**	**W** 17–16	12–3	MetLife Stadium	Recap
17	December 28	**Buffalo Bills**	**L** 9–17	12–4	Gillette Stadium	Recap

Note: Intra-division opponents are in bold text.

=== Postseason ===
Playoff round	Date	Opponent	Result	Record	Game site	NFL.com recap
Wild Card	First-round bye					
Divisional	January 10, 2015	Baltimore Ravens (6)	**W** 35–31	1–0	Gillette Stadium	Recap
AFC Championship	January 18, 2015	Indianapolis Colts (4)	**W** 45–7	2–0	Gillette Stadium	Recap
Super Bowl XLIX	February 1, 2015	vs. Seattle Seahawks (N1)	**W** 28–24	3–0	University of Phoenix Stadium	Recap

== Game summaries ==
=== Regular season ===
==== Week 1: at Miami Dolphins ====
Week One: New England Patriots at Miami Dolphins – Game summary

Quarter	1	2	3	4	Total
Patriots	10	10	0	0	20
Dolphins	7	3	13	10	33

at Sun Life Stadium, Miami Gardens, Florida

- Date: September 7
- Game time: 1:00 p.m. EDT
- Game weather: 89 °F (32 °C), partly cloudy
- Game attendance: 70,630
- Referee: Walt Anderson
- TV announcers (CBS): Greg Gumbel (play-by-play), Trent Green (color commentator) and Evan Washburn (sideline reporter)
- Recap, Gamebook

Game information

First quarter

- Lamar Miller 4-yard pass from Ryan Tannehill (Caleb Sturgis Kick), 11:46. Dolphins 7–0. Drive: 4 plays, 16 yards, 1:50
- Shane Vereen 2-yard TD run (Stephen Gostkowski Kick), 5:15. Tied 7–7 Drive: 13 plays, 80 yards, 6:36
- Stephen Gostkowski 47-yard field goal, 0:47. Patriots 10–7 Drive: 7 plays, 6 yards, 2:52

Second quarter

- Rob Gronkowski 6-yard pass from Tom Brady (Stephen Gostkowski kick), 8:45. Patriots 17–7 Drive: 11 plays, 94 yards, 4:19
- Caleb Sturgis 38-yard field goal, 2:03. Patriots 17–10 Drive: 11 plays, 55 yards, 4:25
- Stephen Gostkowski 45-yard field goal, 0:10. Patriots 20–10 Drive: 8 plays, 47 yards, 1:53

Third quarter

- Caleb Sturgis 24-yard field goal, 10:50. Patriots 20–13 Drive: 8 plays, 66 yards, 4:14
- Mike Wallace 14-yard pass from Ryan Tannehill (Caleb Sturgis kick), 7:01. Tied 20–20 Drive: 4 plays, 34 yards, 2:04
- Caleb Sturgis 22-yard field goal, 2:42. Dolphins 23–20 Drive: 10 plays, 50 yards, 3:15

Fourth quarter

- Knowshon Moreno 4-yard TD run (Caleb Sturgis kick), 3:36. Dolphins 30–20 Drive: 12 plays, 85 yards, 6:01
- Caleb Sturgis 27-yard field goal, 2:49. Dolphins 33–20 Drive: 4 plays, 5 yards, 0:20

Top passers

- NE – Tom Brady: 29/56, 249 YDS, TD
- MIA – Ryan Tannehill: 18/32, 178 YDS, 2 TD, INT

Top rushers

- NE – Shane Vereen: 7 CAR, 36 YDS, TD
- MIA – Knowshon Moreno: 24 CAR, 134 YDS, TD

Top receivers

- NE – Julian Edelman: 6 REC, 95 YDS
- MIA – Mike Wallace: 7 REC, 81 YDS, TD

Top tacklers

- NE – Jerod Mayo: 12 TKL
- MIA – Jimmy Wilson: 7 TKL

The Patriots traveled to Miami to face their division rival Miami Dolphins in the 2014 season opener. The Patriots featured several key additions: Brandon LaFell, Darrelle Revis, and Brandon Browner (even though he was suspended for the first four games).

After forcing a Patriots three-and-out, Chris McCain blocked the punt by Ryan Allen with Jason Trusnik recovering at the Patriots 15. Four plays later, Lamar Miller scored on a 4-yard touchdown pass from Ryan Tannehill, for a 7–0 Dolphins lead. The Patriots responded, marching 80 yards in 13 plays, with Shane Vereen tying the game on a 2-yard run. On the third play of the Dolphins' next drive, Mike Wallace was stripped by Jamie Collins with Jerod Mayo recovering at the Dolphins 35. The Dolphins defense stiffened, and held New England to a 47-yard field goal by Stephen Gostkowski. The Dolphins responded by driving all the way to the Patriots 37, but Alfonzo Dennard intercepted Tannehill at the Patriots 6-yard line. The Patriots proceeded to march 94 yards in 11 plays, aided by a 44-yard bomb from Tom Brady to Julian Edelman, culminating with Brady finding Rob Gronkowski on a six-yard touchdown pass, giving the Patriots a commanding 17–7 lead midway through the second quarter. After reaching their own 47, the Dolphins' turnover woes continued with Logan Ryan stripping Miller and Darrelle Revis recovering at the Patriots 34. The Dolphins defense stiffened and the Patriots punted. The Dolphins answered with a drive deep into Patriot territory, but had to settle for a 38-yard field goal from Caleb Sturgis, trimming the score to 17–10 with 1:59 to go in the half. A 30-yard kickoff return by Patrick Chung and a 33-yard catch by Edelman, helped the Patriots reach the Dolphins 27 where Gostkowski drilled a 45-yard field goal, giving the Patriots a 20–10 lead at halftime. The second half was a different story entirely. The Dolphins stormed all the way to the Patriots 6-yard line on their first possession, but the Patriots defense clamped down and held the Dolphins to a 24-yard field goal to trim the lead back to 7. On the fourth play of the Patriots' next drive, Brady was strip-sacked by Cameron Wake with Louis Delmas recovering at the Patriots 34. Four plays later Tannehill found Wallace for a 14-yard touchdown pass to tie the game midway through the third quarter. Following a Patriots three-and-out, the Dolphins were set up with good position at their own 47. They reached the Patriots 3, but once again the Patriots clamped down and Sturgis booted a 21-yard field goal, regaining the lead for the Dolphins, 23–20. It only got worse for New England. Early in the fourth quarter, facing a 3rd-and-9 at the Dolphins 44, Brady had his best pocket of the 2nd half, but overthrew an open Edelman and the Patriots punted. The Dolphins pulled away on their next drive, methodically marching 85 yards in 12 plays, converting three third-downs, with Moreno rushing for a 4-yard touchdown, increasing the Dolphins lead to 30–20 with just 3:29 remaining in the 4th quarter. Any hope of a Patriots comeback died on their next possession when Brady was sacked by Anthony Johnson on 4th-and-10. The Dolphins didn't get a first down, but Sturgis's 27-yard field goal, his 4th, was good and the Dolphins led 33–20. The Patriots drove deep into Miami territory in the final seconds, but turned the ball over on downs.

The loss was the Patriots' first to open a season since losing 31–0 to the Buffalo Bills in 2003. Tom Brady was sacked four times, losing two fumbles and finishing the day completing only 29 of 56 pass attempts, including 14/35 in the second half, for 249 yards and 1 touchdown. Edelman had 95 yards on just 6 catches, but Brandon LaFell, the new deep-threat, didn't have a single catch. The Patriots defense played well in the first half, forcing three turnovers and holding the Dolphins to just ten points, but allowed 23 points and forced no turnovers in the second half. Ryan Tannehill was efficient, 18 of 32 for 178 yards, 2 touchdowns, and 1 interception. Moreno ran for 134 yards, including 91 yards in the 2nd half, and the Dolphins as a team rushed for 191 yards and out-gained the Patriots in total yards in the second half, 222–67.

==== Week 2: at Minnesota Vikings ====
Week Two: New England Patriots at Minnesota Vikings – Game summary

Quarter	1	2	3	4	Total
Patriots	10	14	3	3	30
Vikings	7	0	0	0	7

at TCF Bank Stadium, Minneapolis, Minnesota

- Date: September 14
- Game time: 1:00 p.m. EDT/12:00 p.m. CDT
- Game weather: 58 °F (14 °C), partly cloudy
- Game attendance: 52,350
- Referee: Tony Corrente
- TV announcers (CBS): Ian Eagle (play-by-play), Dan Fouts (color commentator) and Jenny Dell (sideline reporter)
- Recap, Gamebook

Game information

First quarter

- Matt Asiata 25-yard pass from Matt Cassel (Blair Walsh kick), 11:02. Vikings 7–0 Drive: 7 plays, 80 yards, 4:06
- Stevan Ridley 1-yard TD run (Stephen Gostkowski kick), 6:57. Tied 7–7 Drive: 2 plays, 1 yard, 0:43
- Stephen Gostkowski 48-yard field goal, 0:38. Patriots 10–7 Drive: 10 plays, 40 yards, 4:11

Second quarter

- Julian Edelman 9-yard pass from Tom Brady (Stephen Gostkowski kick), 9:34. Patriots 17–7 Drive: 7 plays, 61 yards, 4:00
- Chandler Jones 58-yard field block return touchdown (Stephen Gostkowski kick), 0:25. Patriots 24–7

Third quarter

- Stephen Gostkowski 47-yard field goal, 8:36. Patriots 27–7 Drive: 5 plays, 17 yards, 1:10

Fourth quarter

- Stephen Gostkowski 27-yard field goal, 15:00. Patriots 30–7 Drive: 11 plays, 46 Yards, 6:49

Top passers

- NE – Tom Brady: 14/21, 149 YDS, TD
- MIN – Matt Cassel: 19/36, 202 YDS, TD, 4 INT

Top rushers

- NE – Stevan Ridley: 25 CAR, 101 YDS, TD
- MIN – Matt Asiata: 13 CAR, 36 YDS

Top receivers

- NE – Julian Edelman: 6 REC, 81 YDS, TD
- MIN – Cordarrelle Patterson: 4 REC, 56 YDS

Top tacklers

- NE –Chandler Jones and Dont'a Hightower: 8 TKL
- MIN – Jasper Brinkley: 11 TKL

After a disappointing loss to the Miami Dolphins, the Patriots looked to bounce back against the lowly Vikings who were without Adrian Peterson who was suspended, but were led by ex-Patriot Matt Cassel at quarterback.

The Vikings took the ball and marched right down the field 80 yards in just 7 plays, with Cassel finding Matt Asiata on a 25-yard touchdown pass for a 7–0 lead just over four minutes into game. This would the highlight of the game for the Vikings. After a Patriots three-and-out, safety Devin McCourty intercepted Cassel at the Patriots 39 and returned it 60 yards down to the 1-yard line. Two plays later, Stevan Ridley scored on a 1-yard run to tie the game. After a Vikings punt, the Patriots reached the Vikings 30-yard line where Gostkowski gave the Patriots a 10–7 lead on a 48-yard field goal from Gostkowski. On the fifth play of the Vikings' next drive, Cassel threw his second interception, this one to Darrelle Revis at the Patriots 39. The Patriots put together a 7 play, 61-yard drive, with Brady finding Edelman for a 9-yard touchdown pass, increasing the Patriots lead to 17–7. Late in the second quarter the Vikings drove to the Patriots 30, but Chandler Jones blocked Blair Walsh's field goal attempt and returned it 58 yards for a touchdown, widening the Patriots lead to 24–7 at halftime. The Patriots reached the Vikings 43 early in the third quarter, but were forced to punt, but the Vikings gave it right back when Cassel threw his third interception, this one to Ryan at the Vikings 45. The Patriots could only reach the Vikings 28, where Gostkowski was connected on a 46-yard field goal and the Patriots led 27–7. Following another Vikings punt the Patriots stormed to the Vikings 9, but their struggling offense couldn't get in the endzone, and Gostkowski's 39-yard field goal gave the Patriots a 30–7 lead. With less than seven minutes remaining in the game, rookie Dominique Easley intercepted Cassel at the Vikings 35. Neither team did anything for the rest of the game and the Patriots won the game.

Brady was efficient completing 14 of 21 passes for 149 yards, one touchdown, and no interceptions, but continued to not be the superstar that he was known to be. Stevan Ridley led the Patriots in rushing, carrying the ball 25 times for 101 yards and a touchdown. Filling in for the suspended Adrian Peterson, Matt Asiata carried the ball 13 times for only 36 yards. Matt Cassel went 19 of 36 for 202 yards with 1 touchdown, but was intercepted 4 times by the Patriots.

==== Week 3: vs. Oakland Raiders ====
Week Three: Oakland Raiders at New England Patriots – Game summary

Quarter	1	2	3	4	Total
Raiders	3	0	6	0	9
Patriots	0	10	0	6	16

at Gillette Stadium, Foxborough, Massachusetts

- Date: September 21
- Game time: 1:00 p.m. EDT
- Game weather: 78 °F (26 °C), cloudy and humid
- Game attendance: 68,756
- Referee: Pete Morelli
- TV announcers (CBS): Greg Gumbel (play-by-play), Trent Green (color commentator) and Evan Washburn (sideline reporter)
- Recap, Gamebook

Game information

First quarter

- Sebastian Janikowski 49-yard field goal, 4:42. Raiders 3–0 Drive: 13 plays, 50 yards, 6:10

Second quarter

- Rob Gronkowski 6-yard pass from Tom Brady (Stephen Gostkowski kick), 4:18. Patriots 7–3 Drive: 15 plays, 84 yards, 6:43
- Stephen Gostkowski 21-yard field goal, 0:03. Patriots 10–3 Drive: 10 plays, 48 yards, 2:45

Third quarter

- Sebastian Janikowski 37-yard field goal, 9:43. Patriots 10–6 Drive: 7 plays, 29 yards, 3:13
- Sebastian Janikowski 47-yard field goal, 2:25. Patriots 10–9 Drive: 9 plays, 57 yards, 3:48

Fourth quarter

- Stephen Gostkowski 20-yard field goal, 13:45. Patriots 13–9 Drive: 10 plays, 57 yards, 3:39
- Stephen Gostkowski 36-yard field goal, 6:24. Patriots 16–9 Drive: 12 plays, 63 yards, 4:55

Top passers

- OAK – Derek Carr: 21/34, 174 YDS, INT
- NE – Tom Brady: 24/37, 234 YDS, TD

Top rushers

- OAK – Darren McFadden: 18 CAR, 59 YDS
- NE – Stevan Ridley: 19 CAR, 54 YDS

Top receivers

- OAK – James Jones: 3 Rec, 43 YDS
- NE – Julian Edelman: 10 Rec, 84 YDS

Top tacklers

- OAK – Tyvon Branch: 10 TKL
- NE – Jerod Mayo: 11 TKL

After back-to-back sub-par performances by the Patriots offense, they faced Derek Carr and the lowly Raiders in their 2014 home opener looking to have their first breakout performance of the season.

After both teams punted on their opening drive, the Raiders reached the Patriots 31 and struck first blood on a 49-yard field goal by Sebastian Janikowski. After both teams punted again, the Patriots embarked on a 15-play, 84-yard drive, converting four third-downs, and scoring on Brady's 6-yard touchdown pass to Gronkowski midway through the second quarter to take a 7–3 lead. The Raiders punted on their next drive, and Marquette King punted only 22 yards to midfield. With the great field position, the Patriots drove all the way to the Raiders 2, but their red zone struggles continued, and they settled for a 20-yard field goal by Gostkowski, giving them a 10–3 lead at halftime. Strong defense continued in the second half. The Raiders drove deep into Patriots territory early in the second quarter, but could only score on a 37-yard field goal by Janikowski. Following a Patriots punt, the Raiders drove from their own 14, to the Patriots 37, but a false start penalty on guard Donald Penn made it 3rd-and-15, and then Carr completed a 13-yard pass to James Jones to the Patriots 29, bringing up a 4th-and-2. The Raiders decided to settle with Janikowski's 47-yard field goal, making the score 10–9. Matthew Slater returned the ensuing kickoff 26 yards to the Patriots 41. With the good field position, the Patriots drove to the Raiders 2 again, but were once again held out of the end zone, and increased their lead to 13–9 on another 20-yard field goal by Gostkowski. After the Raiders went three-and-out, the Patriots marched 63 yards culminating with Gostkowski's 36-yard field goal, increasing the lead to 16–9 midway through the fourth quarter. The Raiders, though, couldn't muster up any offense against the Patriots and they went three-and-out again, but the Patriots failed to put the game away and punted. In just three plays the Raiders reached Patriots territory, but two plays later, on 3rd-and-7 at the Patriots 30-yard line, Carr threw an incomplete pass seemingly bringing up a do-or-die 4th down, but Ryan was called for pass interference moving the ball to the Patriots 6-yard line. On the very next play, Darren McFadden scored on a 6-yard touchdown run, but the score was nullified by a holding penalty on Raiders left guard Gabe Jackson. On the next play, Carr's pass attempt was tipped and intercepted by Vince Wilfork with 0:51 seconds left, which sealed the win for the Patriots.

Tom Brady had his best game to date, despite being pressured relentlessly by the Oakland defensive line, including being sacked twice, completing 24 of 37 passes for 234 yards, with 1 touchdown and no interceptions. The running game struggled, with Ridley leading the team with only 54 yards on 19 carries. Julian Edelman was the leading receiver for either team, with 10 catches for 84 yards. Rob Gronkowski continued to slowly work himself into the offense catching only 3 passes for 44 yards, but also caught the only touchdown. Derek Carr had a sub-par day, going 21 of 34 for only 174 yards, with no touchdowns and an interception. Both defenses were spectacular holding the opposing offense to under 300 yards of offense (241 for the Raiders, 297 for the Patriots). With the win the Patriots advanced to 2–1 and Brady won his 150th career game, 3rd most by a starting quarterback in NFL history.

==== Week 4: at Kansas City Chiefs ====
Week Four: New England Patriots at Kansas City Chiefs – Game summary

Quarter	1	2	3	4	Total
Patriots	0	0	7	7	14
Chiefs	7	10	10	14	41

at Arrowhead Stadium, Kansas City, Missouri

- Date: September 29
- Game time: 8:30 p.m. EDT/7:30 p.m. CDT
- Game weather: 82 °F (28 °C), clear
- Game attendance: 76,613
- Referee: John Parry
- TV announcers (ESPN): Mike Tirico (play-by-play), Jon Gruden (color commentator) and Lisa Salters (sideline reporter)
- Recap, Gamebook

Game information

First quarter

- KC – Jamaal Charles 2-yard run (Cairo Santos kick), 2:15. Chiefs 7–0. Drive: 11 plays, 73 yards, 5:58.

Second quarter

- KC – Jamaal Charles 5-yard pass from Alex Smith (Cairo Santos kick), 10:58. Chiefs 14–0. Drive: 3 plays, 86 yards, 1:27.
- KC – Cairo Santos 22-yard field goal, 0:00. Chiefs 17–0. Drive: 7 plays, 85 yards, 2:24.

Third quarter

- KC – Jamaal Charles 8-yard pass from Alex Smith (Cairo Santos kick), 7:53. Chiefs 24–0. Drive: 2 plays, 9 yards, 0:45.
- KC – Cairo Santos 31-yard field goal, 5:29. Chiefs 27–0. Drive: 4 plays, 0 yards, 1:34.
- NE – Brandon LaFell 44-yard pass from Tom Brady (Stephen Gostkowski kick), 3:26. Chiefs 27–7. Drive: 4 plays, 81 yards, 2:03.

Fourth quarter

- KC – Travis Kelce 2-yard pass from Alex Smith (Cairo Santos kick), 11:52. Chiefs 34–7. Drive: 12 plays, 80 yards, 6:34.
- KC – Husain Abdullah 39-yard interception return (Cairo Santos kick), 10:34. Chiefs 41–7.
- NE – Rob Gronkowski 13-yard pass from Jimmy Garoppolo (Stephen Gostkowski kick), 7:25. Chiefs 41–14. Drive: 7 plays, 81 yards, 3:09.

Top passers

- NE – Tom Brady – 14/23, 159 yards, TD, 2 INT
- KC – Alex Smith – 20/26, 248 yards, 3 TD

Top rushers

- NE – Stevan Ridley – 5 carries, 28 yards
- KC – Knile Davis – 16 carries, 107 yards

Top receivers

- NE – Brandon LaFell – 6 receptions, 119 yards, TD
- KC – Travis Kelce – 8 receptions, 93 yards, TD

Top tacklers

- NE – Jerod Mayo – 10 tackles
- KC – Husain Abdullah – 8 tackles, INT, 2 passes defended

In front of a crowd that set the new record for highest decibel level at an NFL game, the Chiefs dismantled the Patriots 41–14 on Monday Night Football. The Patriots' struggling offensive line combined with Brady's accuracy issues doomed them against Tamba Hali and Justin Houston while the Patriots had no answer for the Chiefs' balanced offensive attack.

The Chiefs had a strong opening possession, reaching the Patriots' 46, but were forced to punt. After a Patriots three-and-out, the Chiefs struck with an 11-play, 73-yard drive, with Jamaal Charles scoring on a 2-yard touchdown run. The Patriots managed to reach the Chiefs' 42-yard line on their next drive but were once again forced to punt. On the Chiefs' next possession, Knile Davis powered his way for a 48-yard carry to the Patriots' 38-yard line. Next, Alex Smith hit star tight-end Travis Kelce on a 33-yard catch-and-run to the Patriots' 5-yard line. Finally, Smith hit Charles for a five-yard touchdown pass, extending the Chiefs' lead to 14–0. The Patriots once again drove into Chiefs' territory on their next drive, but again punted away. Later, the Chiefs drove all the way to the Patriots' 4-yard line, and Smith hit Dwayne Bowe at the Patriots' 1-yard line, which should have ended the half, but Logan Ryan was called for a hands-to-the face on Donnie Avery, giving the Chiefs one more play, and Cairo Santos booted a 22-yard chip-shot field goal for a 17–0 Chiefs' lead at halftime. The Chiefs had gained 303 yards of offense in the first half, the most allowed in one half by the Patriots under Belichick. Both teams punted on their initial second-half possession, but on 2nd and 7 on the Patriots' next possession, Tamba Hali, almost completely untouched by left tackle Nate Solder, strip-sacked Brady and recovered for Kansas City at the Patriots' 9. Two plays later, Smith threw a quick pass to Charles out of the backfield for a touchdown, Charles' third, increasing Kansas City's lead to 24–0. On the Patriots' second play of their next drive, a miscommunication between Brady and Edelman led to an interception by Sean Smith, who returned the ball 34 yards to the New England 13-yard line. The Patriots' defense managed to keep Kansas City out of the end zone, but Santos booted a 31-yard field goal, giving Kansas City a 27–0 lead. On the Patriots' next drive, Vereen ran for 9 yards on 1st down. After being stuffed for no gain on the next play, Brady hit Vereen for a 28-yard gain to the Chiefs' 44. On the very next play, Brady hit Brandon LaFell, who broke through three defenders and raced off for a 44-yard touchdown, making the score 27–7. However, the Chiefs couldn't be stopped. Kansas City answered right back, marching 80 yards in 12 plays, converting two third-and-longs in the process, and scoring on Smith's two-yard touchdown strike to Kelce, extending the lead to 34–7, and killing any hope of a Patriots' comeback. On the ensuing Patriot drive, facing a 3rd-and-4 from their own 26, Husain Abdullah intercepted a Brady pass and returned it 39 yards for a touchdown, giving the Chiefs a 41–7 lead. Abdullah fell to his knees in a Muslim prayer, and was flagged for unnecessary roughness. This caused controversy as many thought it was for his praying. With the deficit an insurmountable 41–7, Brady was benched and rookie Jimmy Garoppolo stepped in. Garoppolo completed 3 passes on the drive: a 5-yard pass to Edelman, a 37-yard screen to LaFell, then a 13-yard touchdown pass to Rob Gronkowski, for a 41–14 score. After both teams punted, the Chiefs ran out the rest of the clock to end the game.

Jamaal Charles was the main weapon of the Chiefs' offense, totaling 108 yards from scrimmage (92 rushing, 16 receiving) and three touchdowns. Knile Davis ran the ball 16 times for 107 yards. Alex Smith was 20/26 for 236 yards, 3 touchdowns, and no interceptions. The Chiefs forced three turnovers and converted them into 17 points while committing no turnovers themselves. Brady completed 14 of 23 passes for a pedestrian 159 yards, 1 touchdown and 2 interceptions while being sacked 3 times. Brandon LaFell was the sole offensive star for the Patriots, catching 6 passes for 119 yards and a touchdown. The 27-point margin of defeat represented the second largest loss for the Patriots in the Bill Belichick era (the Patriots' worst loss was a 31-point loss (31–0) to the Bills in Week 1 of the 2003 season). With the loss, the Patriots' record dropped to 2–2. In his regular press conference the ensuing Wednesday, when asked about the loss (primarily by Albert Breer), Belichick replied several times with his now famous line, "We're on to Cincinnati", which Tom Brady would repeat himself on his Twitter account in 2019 following a loss to the Chiefs with a scheduled game against the Bengals the following week. The Patriots would proceed to win ten of their final twelve regular-season games, clinch the #1 seed, win the AFC Championship, and win the Super Bowl, making that quote a piece of Patriots lore. Following their Super Bowl victory over the Seahawks, several Patriots players, including Brady himself, pointed to this game as the turning point in the Patriots' season.

==== Week 5: vs. Cincinnati Bengals ====
Week Five: Cincinnati Bengals at New England Patriots – Game summary

Quarter	1	2	3	4	Total
Bengals	0	3	14	0	17
Patriots	14	6	14	9	43

at Gillette Stadium, Foxborough, Massachusetts

- Date: October 5
- Game time: 8:30 p.m. EDT
- Game weather: 47 °F (8 °C), clear and cool
- Game attendance: 68,756
- Referee: Jerome Boger
- TV announcers (NBC): Al Michaels (play-by-play), Cris Collinsworth (color commentator) and Michele Tafoya (sideline reporter)
- Recap, Gamebook

Game information

First quarter

- Stevan Ridley 1-yard TD run (Stephen Gostkowski Kick), 10:06. Patriots 7–0 Drive: 10 plays, 80 Yards, 4:57
- Tim Wright 17-yard pass from Tom Brady (Stephen Gostkowski kick), 3:16. Patriots 14–0 Drive: 6 plays, 58 yards, 2:33

Second quarter

- Mike Nugent 23-yard field goal, 4:36. Patriots 14–3 Drive: 10 plays, 57 yards, 4:19
- Stephen Gostkowski 48-yard field goal, 1:17. Patriots 17–3 Drive: 11 plays, 50 yards, 3:21
- Stephen Gostkowski 19-yard field goal, 0:12. Patriots 20–3 Drive: 5 plays, 24 yards, 0:51

Third quarter

- Mohamed Sanu 37-yard pass from *Andy Dalton (Mike Nugent kick), 11:32. Patriots 20–10 Drive: 1 play, 37 yards, 0:05
- Rob Gronkowski 16-yard pass from Tom Brady (Stephen Gostkowski kick), 6:11. Patriots 27–10 Drive: 10 plays 86 yards, 5:21
- Kyle Arrington 9-yard fumble return (Stephen Gostkowski kick), 6:02. Patriots 34–10
- A. J. Green 17-yard pass from Andy Dalton (Mike Nugent kick), 3:48. Patriots 34–17 Drive: 6 plays, 82 yards, 2:17

Fourth quarter

- Stephen Gostkowski 23-yard field goal, 14:57. Patriots 37–17 Drive: 9 plays, 75 Yards, 3:49
- Stephen Gostkowski 47-yard field goal, 7:57. Patriots 40–17 Drive: 9 plays, 43 yards, 4:21
- Stephen Gostkowski 35-yard field goal, 2:59. Patriots 43–17 Drive: 8 plays, 32 yards, 4:11

Top passers

- CIN – Andy Dalton: 15/24, 204 YDS, 2 TD
- NE – Tom Brady: 23/35, 292 YDS, 2 TD

Top rushers

- CIN – Giovani Bernard: 13 CAR, 62 YDS
- NE – Stevan Ridley: 27 CAR, 113 YDS, TD

Top receivers

- CIN – A. J. Green: 5 Rec, 81 YDS, TD
- NE – Rob Gronkowski: 6 Rec, 100 YDS, TD

Top tacklers

- CIN – Terrence Newman: 7 TKL
- NE – Jerod Mayo: 8 TKL

After the Kansas City loss many analysts believed not only was the Patriots season over, but so was their 13-year dynasty. A wave of public criticism of the organization on national and local media (led by scathing analyses by Trent Dilfer and former Patriot Tedy Bruschi, including a disputed report before the game of a confrontation between Josh McDaniels and receiver Aaron Dobson), the Patriots faced the 3–0 Bengals, the last remaining undefeated team, on Sunday Night Football.

The Patriots wasted no time against the Bengals highly touted defense, storming 80 yards in 10 plays, including Brady running for 4 yards on 4th-and-1, with Ridley scoring on a 1-yard touchdown run. The Bengals responded by driving to the Patriots 29, but Mike Nugent missed a 52-yard field goal. Taking over at their own 42, the Patriots raced 58 yards in only 6 plays, scoring on Brady's 17-yard touchdown pass to Tim Wright, increasing the lead to 14–0. A 27-yard pass to Gronkowski earlier in the drive gave Brady 50,000 career passing yards, making him the 6th quarterback in NFL history to throw for 50,000 career yards. After both teams punted on their next two drives, the Bengals finally got on board towards the end of the 2nd quarter, marching 57 yards in 10 plays aided by 25 yards in Patriots' penalties, before Nugent drilled a 23-yard field goal. The Patriots answered though on a 48-yard field goal by Gostkowski, increasing the lead to 17–3. On the first play of Cincinnati's following drive, Andy Dalton hit superstar receiver A. J. Green for a 19-yard gain, but Darrelle Revis forced him to fumble with Jamie Collins recovering, fumbling himself, and cornerback Kyle Arrington recovering at the Bengals 25. The Patriots drove to the Bengals 1-yard line, but had to settle for a 19-yard Gostkowski field goal and a 20–3 halftime lead. After forcing the Patriots to punt early in the second quarter, Adam Jones returned Ryan Allen's punt 47 yards to the Patriots 37. On the first play of the drive, Dalton bombed a 37-yard pass to Mohamed Sanu for a touchdown, trimming the deficit to 20–10. However, Brady and the Pats struck right back, advancing 86 yards, aided by a 19-yard run by Shane Vereen on 3rd-and-16, with Brady firing a 16-yard pass to Gronkowski, giving the Patriots a 27–10 lead over the flustered Bengals. On the ensuing kickoff, former Patriot Brandon Tate was hit by running back Brandon Bolden and fumbled with Kyle Arrington recovering and scampering 9 yards for the touchdown, widening the lead to a shocking 34–10. The Bengals responded by racing 82 yards in just 6 plays, scoring on Dalton's 17-yard touchdown pass to Green, trimming the deficit to 34–17. The Patriots kept hitting though, as they marched 75 yards in 9 plays to the Cincinnati 5. The Bengals managed to keep the Patriots out of the end zone, but Gostkowski kicked a 23-yard field goal on the second play of the fourth quarter, increasing the lead to 37–17. Gostkowski kicked two more field goals and the Patriots, who were left for dead less than a week ago, won a resounding defeat over the best team in football.

Before the game, the Patriots paid tribute to Bengals defensive tackle Devon Still, whose daughter is battling cancer, with a short film during a television timeout saluting his daughter while the Patriots cheerleaders donned Devon Still #75 jerseys; the gesture and donation by the Kraft family to the Cincinnati hospital at which she is being treated, brought a standing ovation and moved Still to tears. With the win, the Patriots advanced to 3–2, making many rethink the "death" of the Patriots. The 505 total yards of offense was the Patriots highest output of the season. The Patriots forced the Bengals into three turnovers (all fumbles) while the Patriots didn't turn it over at all. Tom Brady returned to form going 23/35 for 285 yards and 2 touchdowns and no interceptions. Stevan Ridley and Shane Vereen combined for 203 rushing yards on 36 carries as the Patriots ran for 220 on the night.

==== Week 6: at Buffalo Bills ====
Week Six: New England Patriots at Buffalo Bills – Game summary

Quarter	1	2	3	4	Total
Patriots	0	13	10	14	37
Bills	0	7	7	8	22

at Ralph Wilson Stadium, Orchard Park, New York

- Date: October 12
- Game time: 1:00 p.m. EDT
- Game weather: 55 °F (13 °C), clear & sunny
- Game attendance: 70,185
- Referee: Walt Coleman
- TV announcers (Fox): Kenny Albert (play-by-play), Daryl Johnston (color commentator) and Tony Siragusa (sideline reporter)
- Recap, Gamebook

Game information

First quarter

- No scoring plays

Second quarter

- Tim Wright 1-yard pass from Tom Brady (Stephen Gostkowski kick), 13:04. Patriots 7–0 Drive: 5 plays, 61 yards, 1:49
- Robert Woods 7-yard pass from Kyle Orton (Dan Carpenter kick), 3:52. Tied 7–7 Drive: 10 plays, 67 yards, 4:51
- Stephen Gostkowski 42-yard field goal, 1:43. Patriots 10–7 Drive: 4 plays, 0 yards, 0:26
- Stephen Gostkowski 53-yard field goal, 0:00. Patriots 13–7 Drive: 2 plays, 7 yards, 0:06

Third quarter

- Brian Tyms 43-yard pass from Tom Brady (Stephen Gostkowski kick), 12:30. Patriots 20–7 Drive: 6 plays, 80 yards, 2:30
- Fred Jackson 1-yard TD run (Dan Carpenter kick), 5:33. Patriots 20–14 Drive: 13 plays, 80 yards, 6:57
- Stephen Gostkowski 40-yard field goal, 3:08. Patriots 23–14 Drive: 6 plays, 56 yards, 2:25

Fourth quarter

- Brandon LaFell 18 yard pass from Tom Brady (Stephen Gostkowski kick), 8:42. Patriots 30–14 Drive: 12 plays, 80 yards, 6:08
- Chris Hogan 8-yard pass from Kyle Orton (Kyle Orton pass to Robert Woods for 2-point conversion), 5:58. Patriots 30–22 Drive: 8 plays, 80 yards, 2:44
- Brandon LaFell 56-yard pass from Tom Brady (Stephen Gostkowski kick), 2:49. Patriots 37–22 Drive: 7 plays, 93 yards, 3:09

Top passers

- NE – Tom Brady: 27/37, 361 YDS, 4 TD
- BUF – Kyle Orton: 24/38, 299 YDS, 2 TDS, INT

Top rushers

- NE – Stevan Ridley: 10 CAR, 23 YDS
- BUF – Fred Jackson: 10 CAR, 26 YDS, TD

Top receivers

- NE – Brandon LaFell: 4 Rec, 97 YDS, 2 TD
- BUF – Scott Chandler: 6 Rec, 105 YDS,

Top tacklers

- NE – Pat Chung: 9 TKL
- BUF – Nigel Bradham: 11 TKL

After the first three possessions of the game ended in punts, the Patriots marched 62 yards to the Bills 14-yard line, but the drive ended with Gostkowski missing a 36-yard field goal. On the third play of the Bills resulting possession, though, Kyle Orton was intercepted by Jamie Collins at the Patriots 39-yard line. The Patriots marched 61 yards in just five plays to take the lead on a 1-yard touchdown pass from Brady to Tim Wright. After both teams punted, the Bills lugged 67 yards in just under 5 minutes to tie the game 7–7 on a Kyle Orton touchdown pass to Robert Woods. After a Patriots three-and-out, Orton was strip-sacked by Chandler Jones with Jones recovering at the Bills 24. The Patriots didn't gain a single yard, however, but Gostkowski was successful on a 42-yard field goal try. With 0:06 seconds left in the half, the Bills were attempting to run out the clock, but McCourty stripped C. J. Spiller with Zach Moore recovering at the Bills 42. Brady hit Edelman on a quick 7 yards pass and Gostkowski kicked a 53-yarder for a 13–7 lead at the half. After receiving the opening kickoff of the second half the Patriots reached the Bills 43 in just five plays before Brady launched a bomb to Brian Tyms for a 43-yard touchdown, increasing the New England lead to 20–7. The Bills struck right back with a 13 play, 80-yard drive in just under 7 minutes, culminating in Fred Jackson scoring on a 1-yard touchdown run. The Patriots marched 56 yards on their next possession with Gostkowski adding a 40-yard field goal to increase the lead to 23–14. After a Bills punt Brady led the Patriots down the field and, with just over 6 minutes remaining, found his favorite target, Gronkowski, for a 17-yard touchdown, but the play was nullified for an offensive holding penalty on Jordan Devey. This would prove to just be a delay, because Brady threw an 18-yard touchdown pass to LaFell two plays later, capping a 12 play, 80-yard drive. The Patriots now led 30–14 and looked to be well on their way to victory. However, the Bills wouldn't go away quietly. Kyle Orton calmly engineered an 8-play, 80-yard drive, aided by a 35-yard completion on 4th-and-2, that ended in his 8-yard touchdown pass to Chris Hogan, with a successful two-point conversion, trimming the deficit to one possession, 30–22. Starting at the Patriots 7, Brady converted a 3rd-and-16 with a 17-yard completion to Gronkowski, and a few plays later found LaFell on a medium pass, who turned upfield and raced down the sideline for a 56-yard touchdown, increasing the Patriots lead to 37–22. The Bills reached their own 42 on their final drive, but a sack by Rob Ninkovich and an incomplete pass intended for Scott Chandler on 4th-and-9 officially sealed the deal.

Brady completed 27 of 37 passes for 361 yards, with 4 touchdowns and no interceptions. Kyle Orton was equally very impressive, finishing the game 24 of 38 for 299 yards, with 2 TDs and 1 INT. With 4 catches for 97 yards and 2 touchdowns, LaFell continued to be the Patriots awaited deep-threat at wide receiver. Both teams struggled to run the football. Stevan Ridley ran for only 23 yards on 10 carries, while Fred Jackson ran for only 26 yards on 10 carries. It was later learned the Patriots lost Stevan Ridley and linebacker Jerod Mayo to season ending injuries.

This was the first AFC vs. AFC game to air on Fox.

==== Week 7: vs. New York Jets ====
Week Seven: New York Jets at New England Patriots – Game summary

Quarter	1	2	3	4	Total
Jets	6	6	7	6	25
Patriots	7	10	3	7	27

at Gillette Stadium, Foxborough, Massachusetts

- Date: October 16
- Game time: 8:30 p.m. EDT
- Game weather: 64 °F (18 °C), cloudy
- Game attendance: 68,756
- Referee: Bill Leavy
- TV announcers (CBS/NFLN): Jim Nantz (play-by-play), Phil Simms (color commentator) and Tracy Wolfson (sideline reporter)
- Recap, Gamebook

Game information

First quarter

- Shane Vereen 49-yard pass from Tom Brady (Stephen Gostkowski kick), 13:31. Patriots 7–0 Drive: 4 plays, 80 yards, 1:29
- Nick Folk 22-yard field goal, 6:29. Patriots 7–3 Drive: 12 plays, 76 yards, 7:02
- Nick Folk 47-yard field goal, 0:19. Patriots 7–6 Drive: 10 plays, 46 yards, 5:22

Second quarter

- Nick Folk 46-yard field goal, 7:52. Jets 9–7 Drive 12 plays, 32 yards, 6:18
- Shane Vereen 3-yard pass from Tom Brady (Stephen Gostkowski kick), 4:22. Patriots 14–9 Drive: 10 plays, 80 yards, 3:30
- Nick Folk 27-yard field goal, 1:01. Patriots 14–12 Drive: 9 plays, 32 yards, 3:21
- Stephen Gostkowski 39-yard field goals, 0:00. Patriots 17–12 Drive: 9 plays, 53 yards, 1:01

Third quarter

- Chris Ivory 1-yard TD run (Nick Folk kick), 8:58. Jets 19–17 Drive: 11 plays, 80 yards, 6:02
- Stephen Gostkowski 36-yard field goal, 4:10. Patriots 20–19 Drive: 10 plays, 53 yards, 4:48

Fourth quarter

- Danny Amendola 19-yard pass from Tom Brady (Stephen Gostkowski kick), 7:49. Patriots 27–19 Drive: 7 plays, 46 yards, 3:02
- Jeff Cumberland 10-yard pass from Geno Smith (2-point conversation failed), 2:31. Patriots 27–25 Drive: 12 plays, 86 yards, 5:18

Top passers

- NYJ – Geno Smith: 20/34, 226 YDS, TD
- NE – Tom Brady: 20/37, 261 YDS, 3 TD

Top rushers

- NYJ – Chris Ivory: 21 CAR, 107 YDS, TD
- NE – Shane Vereen: 11 CAR, 43 YDS

Top receivers

- NYJ – Eric Decker: 4 Rec, 65 YDS
- NE – Shane Vereen: 5 Rec, 71 YDS, 2 TD

Top tacklers

- NYJ – Calvin Pryor: 7 TKL
- NE – Dont'a Hightower and Jamie Collins: 13 TKL

The Patriots' next opponent was the New York Jets, on Thursday Night Football. For the fourth straight home game the Patriots played the Jets in a contest where the final margin of victory was less than ten points, and third straight where the margin didn't exceed three points. Tom Brady made his 200th career regular season start.

On the fourth play of the game, Shane Vereen went completely unnoticed by the Jets' secondary, on a wheel route, and Brady hit him for a 49-yard touchdown, just 1:29 into the game. Following this, the Jets drove all the ways to the Patriots 9. On 1st-and-goal, Geno Smith hit Jeremy Kerley for a touchdown, but the play was nullified when offensive guard Oday Aboushi was flagged for holding. The Patriots defense kept them out of the end zone over the next three plays and the Jets settled for a 22-yard field goal from Nick Folk. After a Patriots three-and-out, the Jets seemed primed for a touchdown, but another critical holding call moved the Jets out of the red zone, and Folk kicked a 47-yard field goal, making the score 7–6. The Patriots went three-and-out yet again, but once more the Jets could only get a Folk field goal, this one from 46 yards, but the Jets took their first lead, 9–7. This time the Patriots responded this time, racing 80 yards in 10 plays to take the lead on Brady's 3-yard touchdown pass to Vereen, this one for 3 yards, to take the lead. The Jets reached the Patriots 9 for the second time, but the Patriots defense once again turned into a brick wall in the red zone, and Folk had to kick his fourth field goal of the half to bring the score to 14–12. A crucial pass-interference penalty on Asher Allen on the Patriots' next drive, helped them reach Jets' territory and Gostkowski kicked a 39-yard field goal, giving the Patriots a 17–12 lead at halftime. On the Jets first drive of the third quarter they continued their clock-draining strategy with an 11-play, 6:02 drive, this time reaching the end zone again with Chris Ivory scoring on a 1-yard touchdown plunge, giving the Jets their second lead of the game, 19–17. Once again though, the Patriots countered, moving 53 yards to the Jets 18, and Gostkowski banged in a 36-yard field goal, taking a 20–19 lead. The next five combined possessions ended in punts. With 10:51 remaining in the game, Tom Brady engineered a Brady-esque drive reaching the Jets 4. A 6-yard false start penalty on Wright and a 10-yard offensive pass interference penalty on LaFell sent them back to the Jets 19. Following an in-completion to Vereen, on 3rd-and-Goal, Brady rolled out to the left and found Danny Amendola for the touchdown, extending the Patriots' lead to 27–19. This was Amendola's only catch of the game. The Jets didn't give up though. Geno Smith engineered a 12-play, 86-yard drive, finding tight end Jeff Cumberland for a 10-yard TD pass to cut the Patriots' lead to two points with 2:31 remaining. However, the 2-point conversion failed and the Jets still trailed, 27–25. Amendola recovered the onside kick, but the Jets defense stepped up, preventing the Patriots from running out the clock, giving the Jets one last chance at an upset with 1:06 remaining. Starting at their own 31, Geno Smith hit David Nelson for 11 yards to the Jets 42. Next, completing a pass to Jeremy Kerley for 13 to the Patriots 45. Chris Ivory ran for five yards before heading out of bounds at the Patriots 40. After an incomplete pass, Folk came on to attempt the game-winning 58-yard field with 0:05 seconds left, but the kick was blocked by defensive lineman Chris Jones, who had been called for a personal foul on a field goal attempt against the Jets the previous season which led to Folk's game winning 42-yard field goal, and the Patriots escaped with their third win in a row.

Though not spectacular, Brady was efficient, completing 20 of 37 passes for 261 yards, 3 touchdowns, and no interceptions. Geno Smith completed 20 of 34 passes for 226 yards, a touchdown, and no interceptions. Vereen was the top rusher and receiver for the Patriots, with 43 yards rushing and 71 receiving. It was learned shortly after the game that stalwart defensive end Chandler Jones injured his hip and would miss seven games. The Jets ran for 218 yards on the night, led by Chris Ivory, who continued to be a pest to the Patriots, gaining 107 yards on 21 carries. Chris Johnson added 61 yards on 13 carries. The Jets outgained the Patriots 423-323 and absolutely controlled the clock winning T.O.P. 40:54-19:06, but the Patriots defense tightened down when it mattered.

==== Week 8: vs. Chicago Bears ====
Week Eight: Chicago Bears at New England Patriots – Game summary

Quarter	1	2	3	4	Total
Bears	0	7	8	8	23
Patriots	7	31	7	6	51

at Gillette Stadium, Foxborough, Massachusetts

- Date: October 26
- Game time: 1:00 p.m. EDT
- Game weather: 54 °F (12 °C), cloudy
- Game attendance: 68,756
- Referee: Brad Allen
- TV announcers (Fox): Sam Rosen (play-by-play), John Lynch (color commentator) and Pam Oliver (sideline reporter)
- Recap, Gamebook

Game information

First quarter

- Rob Gronkowski 6-yard pass from Tom Brady (Stephen Gostkowski kick), 9:41. Patriots 7–0 Drive: 5 plays, 55 yards, 2:22

Second quarter

- Stephen Gostkowski 23-yard field goal, 14:57. Patriots 10–0 Drive: 17 plays, 68 yards, 7:05
- Tim Wright 1-yard pass from Tom Brady (Stephen Gostkowski kick), 8:09 Patriots 17–0 Drive: 10 plays, 76 yards, 5:27
- Matt Forte 25-yard pass from Jay Cutler (Robbie Gould kick), 5:32. Patriots 17–7 Drive: 5 plays, 77 yards, 2:37
- Rob Gronkowski 2-yard pass from Tom Brady (Stephen Gostkowski kick), 1:52. Patriots 24–7 Drive: 10 plays, 80 yards, 3:40
- Brandon LaFell 9-yard pass from Tom Brady (Stephen Gostkowski kick), 1:07. Patriots 31–7 Drive: 1 play, 9 yards, 0:04
- Rob Ninkovich 15-yard fumble return (Stehen Gostkowski kick), 0:55. Patriots 38–7

Third quarter

- Rob Gronkowski 46-yard pass from Tom Brady (Stephen Gostkowski kick), 12:42. Patriots 45–7 Drive: 6 plays, 80 yards, 2:18
- Martellus Bennett 20-yard pass from Jay Cutler (Jay Cutler pass to Dante Rosario for 2-point conversion), 0:54. Patriots 45–15 Drive: 7 plays, 80 yards, 3:16

Fourth quarter

- Stephen Gostkowski 27-yard field goal, 9:59. Patriots 48–15 Drive: 13 plays, 71 yards, 5:55
- Alshon Jeffery 10-yard pass from Jay Cutler (Jay Cutler pass to Matt Forte for 2-point conversation), 5:16. Patriots 48–23 Drive: 10 plays, 80 yards, 4:43
- Stephen Gostkowski 39-yard field goal, 2:09. Patriots 51–23 Drive: 7 plays, 21 yards, 3:07

Top passers

- CHI – Jay Cutler: 20/30, 227 YDS, 3 TD, INT
- NE – Tom Brady: 30/35, 354 YDS, 5 TD

Top rushers

- CHI – Matt Forte: 19 CAR, 114 YDS
- NE – Jonas Gray: 17 CAR, 86 YDS

Top receivers

- CHI – Martellus Bennett: 6 Rec, 95 YDS, TD
- NE – Rob Gronkowski: 9 Rec, 149 YDS, 3 TD

Top tacklers

- CHI – D.J. Williams: 10 TKL
- NE – Jamie Collins: 11 TKL

The Patriots came into their week 8 matchup with the lowly Bears looking to win their fourth straight game.

Following a punt by Chicago on the opening possession, with great field position, the Patriots stormed 55 yards in just 5 plays, with Tom Brady connecting with Rob Gronkowski for a 6-yard touchdown, the first of three touchdown receptions on the day for Gronkowski. After a Bears punt, the Patriots took over 7 minutes off the clock in driving to the Bears 5-yard line, but could only settle for a 23-yard Gostkowski field goal, and a 10–0 lead. The Bears fortunes didn't get any better and they punted again on their next drive. The Patriots struck again with a five-and-a-half minute, 76-yard drive culminating with a 1-yard touchdown pass from Brady to Wright, pushing the lead to 17–0. On the Bears next drive, McCourty intercepted Jay Cutler at the Bears 22, but the play was nullified by an illegal contact penalty on Brandon Browner. With new life, the Bears marched another 54 yards and Cutler found Matt Forte on a 25-yard touchdown pass, making the score 17–7. Then Patriots took control of the game from there. In a 57-second span, the Patriots scored 3 touchdowns. First, the Patriots marched 80 yards in 10 plays, with Brady throwing a 2-yard touchdown pass to Gronkowski. Following a Bears three-and-out, Edelman's 49-yard return plus a 10-yard holding penalty on the Bears' Trevor Scott set the Patriots up at the Bears 9. On the first play, Brady hit LaFell for a 9-yard touchdown. On the first play of the ensuing Chicago possession, Cutler was strip-sacked by rookie defensive end Zach Moore with Rob Ninkovich recovering and returning it 15 yards for a touchdown, giving the Patriots a 38–7 blowout lead. Revis intercepted Cutler on the last play of the first half, and the Patriots lead stood 38–7. On the first drive of the 2nd half, Brady hit Gronkowski for 46-yard catch-and-run for a touchdown. This was Tom Brady's fifth touchdown pass of the day (his third career five-touchdown game), and the third for Gronkowski (his second career three touchdown game), extending the lead to a 45–7 massacre. Later in the third quarter, the Bears marched 80 yards with Cutler hitting Martellus Bennett on a 20-yard touchdown pass, with a successful 2-point conversion, making the score 45–15. The Patriots countered by marching 71 yards in just under six minutes, extending the lead to 48–15 on a 27-yard Gostkowski field goal. With the game well out of reach, backup quarterback Jimmy Garoppolo took over for Tom Brady. The Bears would score again when Culter marched the bears 80 yards and hit Alshon Jeffery for a 10-yard touchdown pass, with another successful 2-point conversion, making the score, still insurmountable, 48–23. With a short field after an unsuccessful onside kick attempt, the Patriots moved 21 yards before Gostowski made the score 51–23. The Bears Jimmy Clausen drove them to the Patriots 26, but turned the ball over on downs. Garoppolo took a knee to end the game.

The Patriots' 51 points were their largest single-game total of the season. Tom Brady made history in the game. This was his 17th career game with four touchdowns and zero interceptions, which tied him with Drew Brees for the most all time. In addition, this was his 43rd career game with 3 touchdowns and zero interceptions, which placed him second by Peyton Manning. On top of that, he threw for 354 yards. The Patriots totaled 122 yards rushing as well. Gronkowski and LaFell combined for 20 catches for 273 yards and four touchdowns, with both catching every ball thrown to them. Jay Cutler actually played well, completing 20 of 30 passes for 220 yards and three touchdowns, but threw an interception and lost a fumble. Matt Forte was fantastic, rushing for 114 yards on just 19 carries with a receiving touchdown. However, the Bears defense couldn't stop New England for anything, and it would continue next week when they lost to the Packers 55–14.

==== Week 9: vs. Denver Broncos ====
Week Nine: Denver Broncos at New England Patriots – Game summary

Quarter	1	2	3	4	Total
Broncos	7	0	14	0	21
Patriots	3	24	10	6	43

at Gillette Stadium, Foxborough, Massachusetts

- Date: November 2
- Game time: 4:25 p.m. EST
- Game weather: 35 °F (2 °C), cloudy
- Game attendance: 68,756
- Referee: Walt Anderson
- TV announcers (CBS): Jim Nantz (play-by-play), Phil Simms (color commentator) and Tracy Wolfson (sideline reporter)
- Recap, Gamebook

Game information

First quarter

- Stephen Gostkowski 49-yard field goal, 7:09. Patriots 3–0 Drive: 4 plays, 8 yards, 1:50
- Ronnie Hillman 1-yard run (Brandon McManus kick), 3:53. Broncos 7–3 Drive: 9 plays, 80 yards, 3:15

Second quarter

- Stephen Gostkowski 29-yard field goal, 14:18. Broncos 7–6 Drive: 12 plays, 67 yards, 4:35
- Julian Edelman 5-yard pass from Tom Brady (Stephen Gostkowski kick), 11:39. Patriots 13–7 Drive: 4 plays, 34 yards, 1:53
- Julian Edelman 84-yard punt return TD (Stephen Gostkowski kick), 8:18. Patriots 20–7
- Shane Vereen 5-yard pass from Tom Brady (Stephen Gostkowski kick), 0:08. Patriots 27–7 Drive: 9 plays, 57 yards, 1:57

Third quarter

- Julius Thomas 18-yard pass from Peyton Manning (McManus kick), 11:03. Patriots 27–14 Drive: 6 plays, 57 yards, 2:24
- Stephen Gostkowski 45-yard field goal, 7:45. Patriots 30–14 Drive: 12 plays, 53 yards, 3:20
- Brandon LaFell 10-yard pass from Tom Brady (Gostkowski kick), 7:25. Patriots 37–14 Drive: 1 play, 10 yards, 0:04
- Ronnie Hillman 15-yard pass from Peyton Manning (McManus kick), 5:48. Patriots 37–21 Drive: 4 plays, 72 yards, 1:37

Fourth quarter

- Rob Gronkowski 1-yard pass from Tom Brady (2-point attempt failed), 13:56. Patriots 43–21 Drive: 14 plays, 80 yards, 6:53

Top passers

- DEN – Peyton Manning: 34/57, 438 YDS, 2 TD, 2 INT
- NE – Tom Brady: 33/53, 333 YDS, 4 TD, INT

Top rushers

- DEN – C. J. Anderson: 3 CAR, 18 YDS
- NE – Jonas Gray: 12 CAR, 33 YDS

Top receivers

- DEN – Emmanuel Sanders: 10 REC, 151 YDS
- NE – Rob Gronkowski: 9 REC, 105 YDS, TD

Top tacklers

- DEN – Rahim Moore: 8 TKL
- NE – Jamie Collins: 11 TKL

A week after annihilating the Bears, the 6–2 Patriots faced off with the 6–1 Broncos for supremacy in the AFC. Unlike last season, the Broncos had a highly rated defense, with former Patriot Aqib Talib anchoring the secondary. This was also the 16th Brady-Manning match-up.

After the first three drives of the game ended in punts, Amendola waved for a fair catch at the Patriots 46-yard line, but Kayvon Webster was flagged 15 yards for interfering with Amendola, giving the Patriots the ball at the Denver 39. Despite the great field position, the Patriots failed to get a first down but Gostkowski got the Patriots on the board with a 49-yard field goal. Denver countered, storming 80 yards in just 9 plays, aided by a pass-interference penalty on Brandon Browner, on 3rd-and-10 before Ronnie Hillman punched in a 1-yard touchdown run for a 7–3 Broncos lead. The Patriots then drove 67 yards in 12 plays to reach the Broncos 11, but Denver's defense held the Patriots to a 29-yard field goal by Gostkowski. On the second play of Denver's ensuing drive, Ninkovich intercepted a pass and returned it 11 yards to the Broncos 34-yard line. With the wonderful field position, the Patriots marched 34 yards, with Brady throwing a 5-yard touchdown pass to Edelman. After forcing Denver to punt, Britton Colquitt fumbled the snap, but managed to punt the ball away, Edelman fielded the ball on a bounce and returned the punt 84 yards for a touchdown, increasing the lead to 20–7. The Broncos marched 52 yards to the Patriots 23, but Broncos kicker Brandon McManus missed a 41-yard field goal. The Broncos forced a punt and drove to the Patriots 34-yard line. On 4th-and-6, instead of kicking a 51-yard field goal, the Broncos went for it but Manning was sacked by Akeem Ayers. With pretty good field position, the Patriots marched 57 yards in 9 plays with Vereen scoring on a 5-yard touchdown reception with 0:08 remaining in the half. Manning took a knee and the Patriots led 27–7 at halftime, the Broncos largest deficit of the season. On the first drive of the second half, Brady was intercepted by Bradley Roby at the Broncos 43 (his first turnover since Week 4). Manning drove the Broncos 57 yards, hitting Demaryius Thomas for 27 yards on 3rd-and-6 and then tight end Julius Thomas for an 18-yard touchdown pass, closing the gap to 27–14. The Patriots responded again, driving to the Broncos 27 and Gostkowski increased the lead to 30–14 on a 45-yard field goal. On the Broncos next possession, Browner intercepted Manning at the Broncos 40 and returned it 30 yards to the Broncos 10. On the very next play, Brady hit LaFell for a 10-yard touchdown pass, making the game a shocking blowout with a 37–14 score. Aided by three Patriots penalties, the Broncos stormed 72 yards in just four plays with Hillman catching a 15-yard touchdown pass, trimming the deficit to 37–21. Once again The Patriots struck right back, with Tom Brady driving the Patriots 80 yards, using 14 plays, and taking 6:53 off the clock before connecting with Rob Gronkowski on a 1-yard touchdown pass, with a missed two-point conversion, increasing the lead to 43–21. The Broncos turned the ball over on downs on three straight drives as the Patriots cruised to the sixth straight win.

Tom Brady completed 33 of 53 passes for 333 yards, with 4 touchdowns and 1 interception. Rob Gronkowski had 9 catches for 105 yards and 1 TD, and Julian Edelman added 9 catches for 89 yards and a TD. Peyton Manning was 34 of 57 for 438 yards and 2 touchdowns, but added 2 interceptions. Both running games struggled, limited to 109 combined yards on the ground. With the win, the Patriots took the lead in the race for the AFC's #1 seed, which they would not relinquish, and made them the team to beat in the AFC. It was Tom Brady's eleventh win in sixteen career meetings against Manning and was the Patriots' largest margin of victory over Manning since 2001. This would ultimately be Manning's final game at Gillette Stadium, as he retired the following season.

==== Week 11: at Indianapolis Colts ====
Week Eleven: New England Patriots at Indianapolis Colts – Game summary

Quarter	1	2	3	4	Total
Patriots	7	7	14	14	42
Colts	3	7	3	7	20

at Lucas Oil Stadium, Indianapolis, Indiana

- Date: November 16
- Game time: 8:30 p.m. EST
- Game weather: Played indoors (retractable roof closed)
- Game attendance: 66,751
- Referee: Pete Morelli
- TV announcers (NBC): Al Michaels (play-by-play), Cris Collinsworth (color commentator) and Michele Tafoya (sideline reporter)
- Recap, Gamebook

Game information

First quarter

- Jonas Gray 4-yard run (Stephen Gostkowski kick), 4:38. Patriots 7–0 Drive: 11 plays, 89 yards, 4:14
- Adam Vinatieri 31-yard field goal, 4:19. Patriots 7–3 Drive: 8 plays, 67 yards, 4:18

Second quarter

- Jonas Gray 2-yard run (Gostkowski kick), 3:49. Patriots 14–3 Drive: 11 plays, 68 yards, 4:36
- Hakeem Nicks 10-yard pass from Andrew Luck (Vinatieri kick), 0:55. Patriots 14–10 Drive: 3 plays, 23 yards, 0:21

Third quarter

- Tim Wright 2-yard pass from Tom Brady (Gostkowski kick), 11:09. Patriots 21–10 Drive: 8 plays, 80 yards, 3:50
- Adam Vinatieri 53-yard field goal, 8:31. Patriots 21–13 Drive: 6 plays, 40 yards, 2:39
- Jonas Gray 2-yard run (Gostkowski kick), 3:30. Patriots 28–13 Drive: 10 plays, 80 yards, 5:01

Fourth quarter

- Anthony Castonzo 1-yard pass from Andrew Luck (Vinatieri kick), 13:31. Patriots 28–20 Drive: 11 plays, 80 yards, 4:58
- Jonas Gray 1-yard run (Gostkowski kick), 8:42. Patriots 35–20 Drive: 10 plays, 80 yards, 4:49
- Rob Gronkowski 26-yard pass from Tom Brady (Gostkowski kick), 6:44. Patriots 42–20 Drive: 3 plays, 32 yards, 1:28

Top passers

- NE – Tom Brady: 19/30, 257 YDS, 2 TD, 2 INT
- IND – Andrew Luck: 23/39, 303 YDS, 2 TD, INT

Top rushers

- NE – Jonas Gray: 37 CAR, 201 YDS, 4 TD
- IND – Andrew Luck: 3 CAR, 15 YDS

Top receivers

- NE – Rob Gronkowski: 4 REC, 71 YDS, TD
- IND – Coby Fleener: 7 REC, 144 YDS

Top tacklers

- NE – Jamie Collins: 8 TKL
- IND – Mike Adams: 11 TKL

The 7–2 Patriots faced the 6–3 Colts in a primetime match up on Sunday Night Football, with two of the best passing offenses in the NFL. The Patriots came in looking for their sixth straight win.

After forcing the Colts to a quick three-and-out, the Patriots scored on their opening drive of the game, covering 89 yards, in 11 plays scoring on a 4-yard touchdown run by Jonas Gray. The Colts responded, aided by a 46-yard completion from Luck to T. Y. Hilton, driving to the Patriots 13, but had to settle for an Adam Vinatieri 31-yard field goal to bring the score to 7–3. The Patriots then drove to their own 49, but safety Mike Adams intercepted a pass intended for Tyms at the Colts 6 for no gain. On their next possession, the Colts reached the Patriots 32, but McCourty intercepted Luck and returned it 10 yards back to the Patriots 32. From there the Patriots struck on an 11-play, 68-yard drive, scoring on Gray's 2-yard touchdown run, extending the lead to 14–3. The Patriots forced a three-and-out, but on the third play of the Patriots next drive, Brady was intercepted by Adams again, who returned it 10 yards to the Patriots 23. With the fabulous field position, it took the Colts just three plays for Luck to find Hakeem Nicks on a 10-yard touchdown pass, making the score 14–10 with less than a minute remaining in the first half. After taking the kickoff, the Patriots restarted with an 8 play, 80-yard drive scoring on a 2-yard touchdown pass from Brady to Wright, extending the lead to 21–10. The Colts drove to the Patriots 40 on their next drive, and Vinatieri was good from 53 yards away to trim the deficit to 21–13. The Patriots struck with another touchdown, with Brady passing for 56 yards on a 10-play, 80-yard drive before Gray scored on a 2-yard touchdown run and increasing the Patriots lead to 28–13. The Colts pulled back into the game on their next drive, with Luck completing 5 passes on the next drive for 77 yards, capping it off with his 1-yard touchdown pass to Anthony Castonzo, pulling the game back to 28–20. Despite the effort from Luck and the offense, the Colt defense had no answer for the Patriots, with them driving 80 more yards in 10 more plays, scoring on Gray's 1-yard touchdown run, his fourth, increasing the lead to 35–20 with just 8:43 remaining. The Colts actually stuffed Gray for a two-yard loss at the Colts 31 which would've made it 4th-and-4, but a 15-yard face mask penalty on Jerrell Freeman moved the ball to the 14 and Gray scored 4 plays later. Four straight incompletions gave the Patriots the ball at the Colts 32. After two three-yard runs by Gray, Tom Brady threw a short pass to Gronkowski who broke it off for a 26-yard touchdown, effectively ending the game and clinching the Patriots' sixth straight win. The game also saw several skirmishes between Gronkowski and Sergio Brown, with Gronkowski throwing Brown into an NBC camera after the play on Gray's 4th touchdown. Gronkowski referred to this incident as throwing Sergio Brown "out of the club" for talking trash all game, including posting Gronk's stats on Twitter during the game.

Jonas Gray broke out, running all over the Colts for 201 yards and 4 touchdowns on 37 carries. Tom Brady threw for 257 yards and two touchdowns, but threw two interceptions. The Patriots scored on every drive of the second half with exception of their final drive of the game which was used to run out the clock. Luck threw for 303 yards and two touchdowns, but the running game was a non-factor, totaling just 19 yards on 16 carries, with Trent Richardson running 6 times for 0 yards. Tom Brady improved to 3–0 against Andrew Luck.

==== Week 12: vs. Detroit Lions ====
Week Twelve: Detroit Lions at New England Patriots – Game summary

Quarter	1	2	3	4	Total
Lions	3	3	0	3	9
Patriots	7	17	3	7	34

at Gillette Stadium, Foxborough, Massachusetts

- Date: November 23
- Game time: 1:00 p.m. EST
- Game weather: 58 °F (14 °C), mostly sunny
- Game attendance: 68,756
- Referee: Tony Corrente
- TV announcers (Fox): Joe Buck (play-by-play), Troy Aikman (color commentator) and Erin Andrews (sideline reporter)
- Recap, Gamebook

Game information

First quarter

- Matt Prater 48-yard field goal, 11:44. Lions 3–0 Drive: 8 plays, 50 yards, 3:16
- Tim Wright 4-yard pass from Tom Brady (Stephen Gostkowski kick), 3:10. Patriots 7–3 Drive: 9 plays, 64 yards, 2:37

Second quarter

- Matt Prater 20-yard field goal, 13:37. Patriots 7–6 Drive: 10 play, 78 yards, 4:33
- LeGarrette Blount 3-yard run (Gostkowski kick), 12:43. Patriots 14–6 Drive: 2 plays, 22 yards, 0:54
- Tim Wright 8-yard pass from Tom Brady (Gostkowski kick), 2:42. Patriots 21–6 Drive: 13 plays, 93 yards, 5:03
- Stephen Gostkowski 35-yard field goal, 0:00. Patriots 24–6 Drive: 4 plays, 45 yards, 0:35

Third quarter

- Stephen Gostkowski 43-yard field goal, 5:05. Patriots 27–6 Drive: 9 plays, 50 yards, 3:27

Fourth quarter

- Matt Prater 48-yard field goal, 14:48. Patriots 27–9 Drive: 10 plays, 34 yards, 3:06
- LeGarrette Blount 1-yard run (Gostkowski kick), 1:53. Patriots 34–9 Drive: 9 plays, 66 yards, 4:30

Top passers

- DET – Matthew Stafford: 18/46, 264 yards, 0 TD, 1 INT
- NE – Tom Brady: 38/53, 349 yards, 2 TD, 1 INT

Top rushers

- DET – Joique Bell: 19 CAR, 48 YDS
- NE – LeGarrette Blount: 12 CAR, 78 YDS, 2 TD

Top receivers

- DET – Golden Tate: 4 REC, 97 YDS
- NE – Julian Edelman: 11 REC, 89 YDS

Top tacklers

- DET – DeAndre Levy: 10 TKL
- NE – Dont'a Hightower: 8 TKL

Following a major road victory against the Colts, the Patriots returned home to face another tough team in the Detroit Lions. The Patriots re-signed last season's star LeGarrette Blount who had been released by the Steelers earlier that week after leaving a game early.

On the opening possession of the game Matthew Stafford hit Golden Tate for gains of 24 and 17 yards en route to the Patriots 34, but could only settle for a Matt Prater 48-yard field goal. Later, midway through the first quarter, the Patriots raced 64 yards in 9 plays scoring on Brady's 4-yard touchdown pass to Tim Wright. The Lions replied on their very next possession, driving 78 yards to the Patriots 2-yard line, but the Patriots and their elite red zone defense did their thing and Prater added a 20-yard field goal. It was all Patriots for the rest of the half. Danny Amendola returned the ensuing kickoff 81 yards to the Detroit 22. A 16-yard pass to LaFell and a 3-yard encroachment penalty to Ndamukong Suh moved the ball to the 3-yard line. On the very next play Blount added a 3-yard rushing touchdown, increasing the lead to 14–6. The Lions were able to drive to the Patriots 39, but were forced to punt. Taking over at their own 7, the Patriots methodically moved 93 yards in 13 plays, culminating with Brady find Wright again, for an 8-yard touchdown pass, increasing their lead to 21–6. The Lions drove to the Patriots 35 on the ensuing possession, but Prater missed a 53-yard field goal. Taking over at their own 43, the Patriots needed just four plays to reach the Lions 17 and Gostkowski closed out the half with a 35-yard field goal as they went into the locker room up 24–6. The Patriots took the opening kickoff of the half 70 yards down to the Lions 10-yard line trying to bury Detroit, but on 1st down Tom Brady was intercepted by James Ihedigbo. Like almost every possession on the day, the Lions did nothing and punted after five plays. The Patriots proceeded to march 50 yards to the Lions 25 and Gostkowski added a 43-yard field goal, increasing the lead to 27–6. After both teams swapped three-and-outs the Lions advanced to the Patriots 31, but once again settled for a Matt Prater field goal, making the score 27–9 early in the fourth quarter. After a Patriots three-and-out, the Lions reached the Patriots 25, but turned the ball over on downs after Stafford slid short 1-yard short of the first down on 4th-and-10. After making the Patriots punt, Stafford was intercepted by Logan Ryan. Starting at their own 34, the Patriots marched 66 yards in 9 plays, with LeGarrette Blount finished off the drive with a 1-yard touchdown run.

The Lions looked liked a team that was mentally unprepared and lackluster early on with their offense struggling to score in the red zone and made horrific mistakes. At the end of the game, controversy brewed when a defensive lineman slapped the head of Patriots long snapper Danny Aiken, who ended up missing the Chargers game with a concussion, in the head that led to a personal foul penalty and a first down. The Patriots promptly scored on the next play with a 3-yard Blount touchdown, which angered Lions center Dominic Raiola. Raiola later took out his frustration on Patriots defensive lineman Zach Moore by punching him in the back of the helmet. Tom Brady was 38 of 53 for 349 yards 2 TDs (both to Tim Wright) and 1 INTs. LeGarrette Blount added 78 yard on 12 carries and two TDs in his return. Matthew Stafford struggled going only 18 of 46 for 264 yards 0 TDs and 1 INTs. Joique Bell added only 48 yards on 19 carries. Another reason the Lions couldn't get going, Darrelle Revis locked down vaunted receiver Calvin Johnson holding him to just 4 catches for 58 yards and 0 TDs. With the win, the Patriots improved to 9–2, not only running their winning streak to 7 games, but also making it the 14th straight winning season for the Patriots.

==== Week 13: at Green Bay Packers ====
Week Thirteen: New England Patriots at Green Bay Packers – Game summary

Quarter	1	2	3	4	Total
Patriots	0	14	0	7	21
Packers	13	10	0	3	26

at Lambeau Field, Green Bay, Wisconsin

- Date: November 30
- Game time: 4:25 p.m. EST/3:25 p.m. CST
- Game weather: 28 °F (−2 °C), mostly cloudy
- Game attendance: 78,431
- Referee: Ed Hochuli
- TV announcers (CBS): Jim Nantz (play-by-play), Phil Simms (color commentator) and Tracy Wolfson (sideline reporter)
- Recap, Gamebook

Game information

First quarter

- GB – Mason Crosby 32-yard field goal, 11:14. Packers 3–0 9 Plays, 58 yards, 3:46
- GB – Mason Crosby 35-yard field goal, 3:27. Packers 6–0 11 plays, 66 yards, 5:49
- GB – Richard Rodgers 32-yard pass from Aaron Rodgers (Mason Crosby kick), 0:08. Packers 13–0 4 plays, 85 yards, 1:45

Second quarter

- NE – Brandon Bolden 6-yard run (Stephen Gostkowski kick), 12:59. Packers 13–7 5 plays, 73 yards, 2:09
- GB – Mason Crosby 33-yard field goal, 5:54. Packers 16–7 13 plays, 57 yards, 7:05
- NE – Brandon LaFell 2-yard pass from Tom Brady (Stephen Gostkowski kick), 1:09. Packers 16–14 12 plays, 80 yards, 4:45
- GB – Jordy Nelson 45-yard pass from Aaron Rodgers (Mason Crosby kick), 0:14. Packers 23–14 5 plays 81 yards, 0:55

Third quarter

- No scoring plays.

Fourth quarter

- NE – Brandon LaFell 15-yard pass from Tom Brady (Stephen Gostkowski kick) 13:51. Packers 23–21 9 plays, 78 yards, 3:50
- GB – Mason Crosby 28-yard field goal, 8:41. Packers 26–21 11 plays, 65 yards, 5:10

Top passers

- NE – Tom Brady: 22/35, 245 YDS, 2 TD, 0 INT
- GB – Aaron Rodgers: 24/38, 368 YDS, 2 TD, 0 INT

Top rushers

- NE – LeGarrette Blount: 10 CAR, 58 YDS
- GB – Eddie Lacy: 21 CAR, 98 YDS

Top receivers

- NE – Rob Gronkowski: 7 REC, 98 YDS
- GB – Davante Adams: 6 REC, 121 YDS

Top tacklers

- NE – Jamie Collins: 13 TKL
- GB – Tramon Williams: 9 TKL

In a game that was hyped as a potential Super Bowl preview, the Patriots rolled into Lambeau Field to face Aaron Rodgers and the red hot 8–3 Packers who were 6–0 at home, in a game that lived up to the hype. This was the first matchup between Aaron Rodgers and Tom Brady as starting quarterbacks (Brett Favre started as the quarterback in the teams’ 2006 matchup), as Rodgers missed the 2010 contest at Gillette Stadium with a concussion

On the opening drive of the game, the Packers drove all the way to the Patriots 14, but the Patriots red zone defense continued to stay hot and forced them to settle for a 32-yard field goal by Mason Crosby. After a Patriots punt, the Packers, aided by a 33-yard completion from Rodgers to Davante Adams, reached the Patriots 17, but once again the Patriots defense kept them out of the end zone and Mason Crosby kicked a 35-yard field goal, increasing the Packers lead to 6–0. After a Patriots three-and-out, the Packers stormed 85 yards in only 4 plays with Rodgers finding Richard Rodgers deep for a 45-yard touchdown pass, increasing the lead to 13–0. After a terrible first quarter, the Patriots got things going on their next drive. On the first play of the second quarter, Tom Brady darted a pass to Gronkowski for a 29-yard gain to the Packers 41. Three plays later Brandon Bolden scampered for a 6-yard touchdown, trimming the deficit to 13–7. The Patriots defense responded by getting the Packers to a 3rd-and-5, but no pass rush allowed Rodgers 14 seconds to find Randall Cobb for a 33-yard gain to the Patriots 34. The Packers reached the Patriots 6, but Hightower sacked Rodgers for a 9-yard loss on 3rd-and-goal, and Crosby kicked a 33-yard field goal with just under six minutes remaining in the first half. Down 16–7, Brady drove the Patriots back down the field again on an 80-yard drive, finding LaFell in the back of the end zone for a 2-yard touchdown pass, trimming the score to 16–14. However, 1:05 would prove to be too much time for Aaron Rodgers. After an incompletion to Adams, Rodgers threw a screen pass to James Starks who took it 28 yards to the Packers 47. An 8-yard completion to Jordy Nelson moved the ball to the Patriots 45. Two plays later, Rodgers hit Nelson in stride, who outran Revis and McCourty, for a 45-yard touchdown with 00:14 remaining in the first half, increasing the lead to 23–14. That was only the 2nd touchdown Revis allowed all season. The third quarter was a stalemate, as both defenses began to take over and neither team scored. The Patriots took over with 2:21 remaining in the third and constructed a 9 play, 78-yard drive with Brady throwing a laser to LaFell for a 15-yard touchdown early in the fourth quarter, pulling the Patriots within two, 23–21. The Packers countered, reaching the Patriots 10, but Adams dropped a sure touchdown on a wide-open slant on 3rd-and-5, but Crosby kicked a 28-yard field goal, making the score 26–21 with 8:41 remaining. On their next drive, Brady converted a 4th-and-3 to Edelman at their own 49, and two plays later converted a 3rd-and-7 with a 10-yard pass to Gronkowski. Three plays later, Brady dropped a pass into the arms of Rob Gronkowski who caught the ball momentarily, but Ha'Sean Clinton-Dix punched it out before it could be ruled a catch, wiping out a touchdown. On the very next play, Mike Daniels and Mike Neal combined to sack Brady for a 9-yard loss. Instead of calling a timeout Gostkowski was sent out on the field for a 47-yard field goal attempt with the clock running to preserve a timeout at the two-minute warning, but Gostkowski missed the hurried field goal attempt, keeping the score 26–21 with just 2:40 remaining. The Patriots forced a 3rd-and-4, but Rodgers converted it with a 7-yard pass to Cobb, enabling the Packers to run out the clock and win the game.

The Patriots fell to 9–3 with the loss, snapping their 7-game winning streak. The Patriots looked nothing like the team that had won 7 straight games, struggling in all facets of the game. Tom Brady was 22 of 35 for 245 yards 2 touchdowns and no interceptions. The Patriots managed 84 yards rushing, but only carried the ball 19 times. Rob Gronkowski was the receiving star for the Patriots with 7 catches for 98 yards. Aaron Rodgers, continuing his home dominance, turned in another great performance, completing 24 of 38 passes for 368 yards, two touchdowns, and no interceptions, benefiting from the Patriots almost non-existent pass rush. They managed three sacks, but couldn't get any consistent pressure. Meanwhile, Eddie Lacy had 98 yards on 21 carries. Davante Adams was the receiving star for the Packers with 6 catches for 121 yards.

==== Week 14: at San Diego Chargers ====
Week Fourteen: New England Patriots at San Diego Chargers – Game summary

Quarter	1	2	3	4	Total
Patriots	3	10	0	10	23
Chargers	0	14	0	0	14

at Qualcomm Stadium, San Diego, California

- Date: December 7
- Game time: 8:30 p.m. EST/5:30 p.m. PST
- Game weather: 67 °F (19 °C), partly cloudy
- Game attendance: 68,815
- Referee: Bill Leavy
- TV announcers (NBC): Al Michaels (play-by-play), Cris Collinsworth (color commentator) and Michele Tafoya (sideline reporter)
- Recap, Gamebook

Game information

First quarter

- Stephen Gostkowski 22-yard field goal, 3:15. Patriots 3–0 Drive: 17 plays, 89 yards, 7:56

Second quarter

- Malcolm Floyd 15-yard pass from Philip Rivers (Nick Novak kick), 13:29. Chargers 7–3 Drive: 11 plays, 80 yards, 4:46
- Darrell Stuckey 53-yard fumble return (Novak kick), 11:06. Chargers 14–3
- Stephen Gostkowksi 22-yard field goal, 7:28. Chargers 14–6 Drive: 12 plays, 70 yards, 3:28
- Rob Gronkowski 14-yard pass from Tom Brady (Gostkowski kick), 3:28. Chargers 14–13 Drive: 4 plays, 25 yards, 2:03

Third quarter

- No scoring plays

Fourth quarter

- Stephen Gostkowski 38-yard field goal, 10:34. Patriots 16–14 Drive: 10 plays, 55 yards, 5:04
- Julian Edelman 69-yard pass from Tom Brady (Gostkowski kick), 8:41. Patriots 23–14 Drive: 1 play, 69 yards, 0:12

Top passers

- NE – Tom Brady: 28/44, 317 YDS, 2 TD, 1 INT
- SD – Philip Rivers: 20/33, 189 YDS, 1 TD, 1 INT

Top rushers

- NE – LeGarrette Blount: 20 CAR, 66 YDS
- SD – Ryan Matthews: 11 CAR, 44 YDS

Top receivers

- NE – Julian Edelman: 8 REC, 141 YDS, 1 TD
- SD – Donald Brown: 5 REC, 49 YDS

Top tacklers

- NE – Jamie Collins: 9 TKL
- SD – Jahleel Addae: 8 TKL

Coming off their first loss in their last 8 games, the Patriots came to San Diego to face the 8–4 Chargers, who were on a three-game winning streak.

After forcing the Chargers to punt, the Patriots put together a 17 play, 89-yard marathon drive to the Chargers 1-yard line, but on 3rd-and-goal Brady was sacked for a 7-yard loss and Shareece Wright blocked Gostkowski's 26-yard field goal attempt, but he was flagged for being offsides, and Gostkowski made a 22-yard field goal. The Chargers answered the Patriots on their next drive, marching 80 yards in 11 plays with Philip Rivers hitting Malcolm Floyd for a 15-yard touchdown to put the Chargers up 7–3. On the fourth play of the Patriots next drive, Brady threw a two-yard pass to LaFell, who was stripped by Jahleel Addae with Darrell Stuckey picking up the fumble and rumbling 53 yards for a touchdown and a 14–3 Chargers lead. The Patriots drove all the way to the Charges 4-yard line, but the Chargers defense made a stand and the Patriots settled for a 22-yard Gostkowski field goal, and the score was 14–6. After forcing a Chargers three-and-out, Bolden blocked Mike Scifres' punt, knocking him out of the game, at the Chargers 25. Four plays later, Brady threw a 14-yard touchdown pass to Gronkowski, cutting the deficit to 14–13. After another Chargers punt, the Patriots drove to the Chargers 18, but Brady was intercepted by Manti Te'o at the 4, concluding a sloppy, unimpressive, first half for both offenses. Both offenses came out just as bad in the second half, resulting in a combined five consecutive 3-and-outs. Midway through the third quarter, Devin McCourty intercepted Rivers at the Patriots 44 and returned it 56 yards for a touchdown, but a helmet-to-helmet hit by Browner on Ladarius Green nullified the score. Replays showed Browner hit his shoulder, not his head, but the ruling was upheld. The break seemed to spur the Chargers to a score, as they reached Patriots territory but Rivers was intercepted by Akeem Ayers at the Patriots 30-yard line. The Patriots offense continued their cold streak by going three-and-out on their fourth straight drive, but their defense continued to shut down San Diego. A 16-yard punt return by Edelman set the Patriots up at their own 25. They marched 55 yards to the Chargers 20, and took the lead on a 38-yard Gostkowski field goal, giving the Patriot a 16–14 lead midway through the fourth quarter. After the Chargers went three-and-out for the fourth time in five drives (the lone exception ending in an interception), Brady hit Edelman on the first play of their next drive for a 69-yard catch-and-run touchdown. The extra point made the score 23–14, sealing another Patriots win.

Despite the win, the Chargers showed that the Patriots offense was still prone to mistakes. Edelman was the star, with 8 catches for 141 yards and a touchdown. The Patriots defense had a great showing, holding the Chargers to just 216 total yards, sacking Philip Rivers four times, with an interception. This loss would send the Chargers to ultimately lose three of their last four and their season.

==== Week 15: vs. Miami Dolphins ====
Week Fifteen: Miami Dolphins at New England Patriots – Game summary

Quarter	1	2	3	4	Total
Dolphins	3	10	0	0	13
Patriots	7	7	24	3	41

at Gillette Stadium, Foxborough, Massachusetts

- Date: December 14
- Game time: 1:00 p.m. EST
- Game weather: 43 °F (6 °C), sunny
- Game attendance: 68,756
- Referee: Bill Vinovich
- TV announcers (CBS): Ian Eagle (play-by-play), Dan Fouts (color commentator) and Jenny Dell (sideline reporter)
- Recap, Gamebook

Game information

First quarter

- Kyle Arrington 62-yard blocked field goal return (Stephen Gostkowski kick), 12:36. Patriots 7–0
- Caleb Sturgis 24-yard field goal, 0:59. Patriots 7–3 Drive: 9 plays, 60 yards, 4:47

Second quarter

- Shane Vereen 3-yard run (Gostkowski kick), 7:59. Patriots 14–3 Drive: 3 plays, 8 yards, 0:42
- Caleb Sturgis 53-yard field goal, 4:26. Patriots 14–6 Drive: 7 plays, 38 yards, 3:33
- Mike Wallace 32-yard pass from Ryan Tannehill (Sturgis kick), 0:05. Patriots 14–13 Drive: 1 play, 32 yards, 0:06

Third quarter

- LeGarrette Blount 3-yard run (Gostkowski kick), 11:04. Patriots 21–13 Drive: 8 plays, 79 yards, 3:56
- Stephen Gostkowski 35-yard field goal, 4:43. Patriots 24–13 Drive: 10 plays, 47 yards, 4:03
- Rob Gronkowski 27-yard pass from Tom Brady (Gostkowski kick), 4:30. Patriots 31–13 Drive: 1 play, 27 yards, 0:05
- Julian Edelman 6-yard pass from Tom Brady (Gostkowski kick), 1:29. Patriots 38–13 Drive: 3 plays, 47 yards, 1:19

Fourth quarter

- Stephen Gostkowski 36-yard field goal, 6:20. Patriots 41–13 Drive: 11 plays, 67 yards, 4:26

Top passers

- MIA – Ryan Tannehill: 29/47, 346 YDS, 1 TD, 2 INT
- NE – Tom Brady: 21/35, 287 YDS, 2 TD, 1 INT

Top rushers

- MIA – Lamar Miller: 16 CAR, 47 YDS
- NE – Jonas Gray: 11 CAR, 62 YDS

Top receivers

- MIA – Mike Wallace: 5 REC, 104 YDS, 1 TD
- NE – Rob Gronkowski: 3 REC 96 YDS, 1 TD

Top tacklers

- MIA – Jason Trusnik, Kelvin Sheppard: 10 TKL
- NE – Patrick Chung: 10 TKL

The Patriots faced the Dolphins at home looking not only for revenge, but to clinch the AFC East for the sixth straight season.

On the opening drive of the game, the Dolphins raced 57 yards in just 5 plays, all the way to the Patriots 23, setting up a 41-yard field goal attempt by Caleb Sturgis, but Jamie Collins blocked it, Kyle Arrington picked it up and raced 62 yards for a touchdown. After a Dolphins punt, the Pats drove 42 yards to the Dolphins 38, but Brady was intercepted by Jason Trusnik at the 34. The Dolphins drove 60 yards to the Patriots 6, but the red zone defense forced them to kick a 24-yard field goal. After a Patriots punt, the Dolphins drove to their own 45, but Ryan Tannehill was intercepted by Duron Harmon at the Patriots 34 and returned the ball 60 yards to the Dolphins 8. Three plays later, Shane Vereen ran in a 3-yard touchdown, increasing the lead to 14–3. Jarvis Landry returned the ensuing kick 26 yards to the Dolphins 37. They drove 38 yards to the Patriots 35, but Sturgis kicked a 53-yard field goal. After the next three drives ended in punts, with the first half winding down, Tannehill connected with Wallace on a 32-yard touchdown bomb with 0:05 left to trim the score to 14–13 on a play that was initially ruled a drop. After a decent offensive showing in the first half, the Patriots went on a barrage of scoring in the third quarter. After returning the kickoff 19 yards to the 21, the Patriots stormed 79 yards in just 8 plays, increasing their lead to 21–13 on LeGarrette Blount's 3-yard touchdown run. After a Dolphins three-and-out, the Patriots drove 47 yards to the Dolphins 17 where Gostkowski drilled a 35-yard for goal, increasing the lead to 24–13. Patrick Chung intercepted a pass on the first play of the next drive and returned it 10 yards to the Dolphins 27. The Patriots cashed it in for a touchdown on the first play with Brady air mailing a 27-yard touchdown strike to Rob Gronkowski, upping the lead to 31–13. After another Dolphins three-and-out, the Patriots need just three plays to put the game on ice. First Jonas Gray ran for 6 yards to the Dolphins 41, followed by Brady hooking up with Gronkowski for 35 yards to the Patriots 6. Brady then found Edelman for the 6-yard touchdown pass on the next play, making the score 38–13. The Dolphins drove 65 yards in 14 plays to the Patriots 25, but on 4th-and-18, Daniel Thomas could only gain 10 yards and the Dolphins turned the ball over on downs. The Patriots scored the final points on a 36-yarder, making the score 41–13. The Dolphins turned the ball over on downs and the Patriots took a knee to end the game.

The Patriots offensive line was immensely better than the opening day game against Miami as Brady wasn't sacked at all. Brady tossed 2 TDs to Edelman and Gronkowski while Vereen and Blount picked up rushing TDs. Gronkowski was their leading receiver with 96 yards and 1 touchdown on just 3 catches, and in the process secured his second 1,000 yard season. Miami picked up 384 yards of offense, but mostly couldn't get out of their own way with two turnovers and some awful drops, including a dropped touchdown by Mike Wallace. With the blowout win, the Patriots improved to 11–3, clinching their 17th AFC East title in franchise history, the 12th in the Brady–Belichick era, and their 6th straight.

==== Week 16: at New York Jets ====
Week Sixteen: New England Patriots at New York Jets – Game summary

Quarter	1	2	3	4	Total
Patriots	0	7	3	7	17
Jets	0	10	3	3	16

at MetLife Stadium, East Rutherford, New Jersey

- Date: December 21
- Game time: 1:00 p.m. EST
- Game weather: 34 °F (1 °C), cloudy
- Game attendance: 78,160
- Referee: Brad Allen
- TV announcers (CBS): Spero Dedes (play-by-play) and Solomon Wilcots (color commentator)
- Recap, Gamebook

Game information

First quarter

- No scoring plays

Second quarter

- Rob Gronkowski 3-yard pass from Tom Brady (Stephen Gostkowski kick), 12:10. Patriots 7–0 Drive: 6 plays, 36 yards, 2:35
- Jeff Cumberland 20-yard pass from Geno Smith (Nick Folk kick), 5:59. Tied 7–7 Drive: 12 plays, 87 yards, 6:11
- Nick Folk 26-yard field goal, 0:52. Jets 10–7 Drive: 10 plays, 54 yards, 4:01

Third quarter

- Nick Folk 23-yard field goal, 6:39. Jets 13–7 Drive: 11 plays, 66 yards, 6:14
- Stephen Gostkowski 24-yard field goal, 1:55. Jets 13–10 Drive: 13 plays, 81 yards, 4:44

Fourth quarter

- Jonas Gray 1-yard run (Gostkowski kick), 13:51. Patriots 17–13 Drive: 8 plays, 38 yards, 2:17
- Nick Folk 37-yard field goal, 7:53 Patriots 17–16 Drive: 12 plays, 59 yards, 5:58

Top passers

- NE – Tom Brady : 23/35, 182 YDS, 1 TD, 1 INT
- NYJ – Geno Smith : 17/27, 210 YDS, 1 TD, 1 INT

Top rushers

- NE – Shane Vereen: 6 CAR, 38 YDS
- NYJ – Chris Ivory: 11 CAR, 53 YDS

Top receivers

- NE – Brandon LaFell: 7 REC, 64 YDS
- NYJ – Jeremy Kerley: 3 REC, 54 YDS

Top tacklers

- NE – Jamie Collins: 10 TKL
- NYJ – David Harris: 10 TKL

Just like the earlier match-up, the second game against the Jets was another defensive battle with the game being decided late in the fourth quarter. Four the fourth time in their last five games against the Jets, the Patriots won by three points or less (the exception being the butt fumble game of 2012).

The first seven drives of the game ended in punts. On the second play of the quarter, Amendola returned Ryan Quigley's punt 39 yards to the Jets 36. Eight plays later, Brady hit Gronkowski on a 3-yard touchdown pass for a 7–0 lead. The Jets countered on their next drive marching 87 yards in just over 6 minutes, scoring on Geno Smith's 20-yard touchdown pass to Jeff Cumberland to tie the game. After a Patriots three-and-out, the Jets drove 54 yards to the Patriots 8, but, like the first match-up, had to settle for a 26-yard field goal by Nick Folk and a 10–7 lead at halftime. The Patriots offensive line was dominated by Sheldon Richardson and the Jets defensive line, as they sacked Brady four times in the first half. The Patriots received the second-half kickoff, but were forced to punt. The Jets capitalized by marching 66 yards in just over 6 minutes to the Patriots 5-yard line, but only could muster a 23-yard field goal from Folk, extending the lead to 13–7. The Patriots drove 81 yards to the Jets 6, but Brady threw an incomplete pass on 3rd-and-2 and Gostkowski kicked a 24-yard field goal, trimming the deficit to 13–10. On the second play of the Jets next drive, Smith was intercepted by Jamie Collins at the Jets 40-yard line, he lateraled to Browner who reached the Jets 38. Eight plays later Jonas Gray scored on a 1-yard touchdown run, giving the Patriots a 17–13 lead on the third play of the fourth quarter. The Jets drove 59 yards to the Patriots 10, but on 2nd-and-8, Smith was sacked by Sealver Siliga for a 9-yard loss and an incomplete pass on 3rd-and-17 forced them to settle for a 37-yard field goal by Folk, trimming the deficit to 17–16 with 7:53 remaining. On the second play of the Patriots' next drive, Brady was intercepted by Marcus Williams at the Patriots 30-yard line. After two runs for 6 yards, Smith was sacked for a 10-yard loss on 3rd down by Dont'a Hightower, setting up Folk's 52-yard go-ahead field goal attempt, but Vince Wilfork blocked Folk's attempt, keeping the Patriots ahead 17–16. On the Patriots' next drive, two third-down conversions allowed the Patriots to run out the clock. With the win, the Patriots improved to 12–3, and they clinched home field advantage throughout the playoffs after the Broncos' loss to the Bengals on Monday night. This would wind up being Rex Ryan's last game against the Patriots as head coach of the New York Jets.

The Patriots were far from outstanding on offense. Brady finished 23/35 but for just 146 yards and 1 touchdown with 1 interception. The Patriots combined for just 85 rushing yards on 24 carries, but the defense came through again. The Jets once again out-gained the Patriots in total yards, but yet again, couldn't score touchdowns, and fell to big plays by the Patriots.

Following the Denver Broncos loss to the Cincinnati Bengals the following day on Monday Night Football, the Patriots clinched the #1 seed in the AFC playoffs.

==== Week 17: vs. Buffalo Bills ====
Week Seventeen: Buffalo Bills at New England Patriots – Game summary

Quarter	1	2	3	4	Total
Bills	7	10	0	0	17
Patriots	3	3	3	0	9

at Gillette Stadium, Foxborough, Massachusetts

- Date: December 28
- Game time: 1:00 p.m. EST
- Game weather: 49 °F (9 °C), mostly cloudy
- Game attendance: 68,756
- Referee: Terry McAulay
- TV announcers (CBS): Spero Dedes (play-by-play) and Solomon Wilcots (color commentator)
- Recap, Gamebook

Game information

First quarter

- Robert Woods 6-yard pass from Kyle Orton (Dan Carpenter kick), 11:59. Bills 7–0 Drive: 6 plays, 80 yards, 3:01
- Stephen Gostkowski 24-yard field goal, 3:02. Bills 7–3 Drive: 13 plays, 80 plays, 5:33

Second quarter

- Anthony Dixon 1-yard run (Carpenter kick), 10:38. Bills 14–3 Drive: 13 plays, 80 yards, 7:24
- Stephen Gostkowski 44-yard field goal, 5:07, 5:09. Bills 14–6 Drive: 8 plays, 18 yards, 3:24
- Dan Carpenter 48-yard field goal, 2:14. Bills 17–6 Drive: 7 plays, 17 yards, 2:53

Third quarter

- Stephen Gostkowski 35-yard field goal, 0:37. Bills 17–9 Drive: 5 plays, 27 yards, 2:18

Fourth quarter

- No scoring plays

Top passers

- BUF – Kyle Orton: 16/23, 176 YDS, 1 TD
- NE – Jimmy Garoppolo: 10/17, 90 YDS

Top rushers

- BUF – Fred Jackson: 18 CAR, 58 YDS
- NE – LeGarrette Blount: 10 CAR, 62 YDS

Top receivers

- BUF – Sammy Watkins: 3 REC, 57 YDS
- NE – Brandon LaFell: 4 REC, 70 YDS

Top tacklers

- BUF – Ron Brooks: 9 TKL
- NE – Jonathan Casillas: 9 TKL

With the AFC East division title and home field advantage wrapped up, the Patriots rested many players, including tight end Rob Gronkowski and wide receiver Julian Edelman in the final game of the regular season.

The Bills took the opening kickoff and raced 80 yards, aided by a 43-yard pass from Orton to Sammy Watkins, scoring on a 6-yard pass from Orton Robert Woods barely three minutes into the game. After both teams punted, the Patriots engineered a 13 play, 80-yard drive marching all the way to the Bills 6, but the Bills defense held them to a 24-yard field goal from Stephen Gostkowski. The Bills countered with an 80-yard drive, covering 13 plays in seven-and-a-half minutes, scoring on a 1-yard touchdown run from Anthony Dixon a few minutes into the second quarter, extending the lead to 14–3. Following a Patriots three-and-out, Jamie Collins strip-sacked Orton and recovered it at the Bills 44. The Patriots drove to the Bills 26, and Gostkowski kicked a 44-yard field goal and the score read 14–6. The Bills answered again though. Marcus Thigpen returned the ensuing kickoff 49 yards to the Patriots 47. The Bills only reached the Patriots 30, but Dan Carpenter was good on a 48-yard field goal, increasing the Bills lead to 17–6 at halftime. Jimmy Garoppolo took over for Brady in the second half. After the first two drives of the second half ended in punts, the Patriots marched 70 yards, using 11 plays in over 6 minutes to the Bills 13, but the Bills stuffed Garoppolo for a 1-yard loss on 4th-and-1. The Patriots forced the Bills to punt on their next drive, and Amendola returned the Bills punt 26 yards to the Bills 44. After a 20-yard pass to LaFell the Patriots were unable to get another first down, but Gostkowski hit a 35-yard field goal, trimming the score to 17–9. The Bills drove to the Patriots 43 on their next possession, but punted. The Patriots reached the Bills 30, but Brandon Bolden was stuffed for a 1-yard loss and Garoppolo was sacked for a 15-yard loss by Manny Lawson and Jerry Hughes, bringing up a 3rd-and-26. Garoppolo completed an 18-yard pass to Tyms, making it a manageable 4th-and-8, but the catch was nullified by a holding call on Marcus Cannon, making it 3rd-and-36. Garoppolo completed a 15-yard pass to Wright, but the Patriots decided to punt rather than try and convert a 4th-and-21. The Bills drove to the Patriots 41, but the Patriots forced another punt. Back-to-back completions to James White brought up a 3rd-and-2, but back-to-back incompletions resulted in a turnover on downs and two knees gave the Bills the win.

Brady started the game for the first half and finished 8 of 16 for 80 yards. Backup quarterback Jimmy Garoppolo would finish the game 10 of 17 for 90 yards, as the Patriots would lose the game 17–9. With the loss, the Patriots finished the regular season at 12–4, and is their first loss at home to the Bills since 2000, Brady's rookie season. It was also their first loss at home since December 16, 2012, when they lost to that year's eventual NFC Champions, the San Francisco 49ers. They finished 4–1 against teams that would make the playoffs, their only loss, a five-point loss against the Packers in Green Bay. The Patriots defense once again played well, holding the Bills to just 268 total yards and forced a turnover. This would mark Tom Brady's final ever loss to the Bills.

=== Postseason ===
==== AFC Divisional Playoffs: vs. (6) Baltimore Ravens ====
AFC Divisional Playoffs: (6) Baltimore Ravens at (1) New England Patriots – Game summary

Quarter	1	2	3	4	Total
Ravens	14	7	7	3	31
Patriots	7	7	14	7	35

at Gillette Stadium, Foxborough, Massachusetts

- Date: January 10, 2015
- Game time: 4:35 p.m. EST
- Game weather: 20 °F (−7 °C), clear, windy and cold
- Game attendance: 68,756
- Referee: Bill Vinovich
- TV announcers (NBC): Al Michaels (play-by-play), Cris Collinsworth (color commentator) and Michele Tafoya (sideline reporter)
- Recap, Gamebook

Game information

First quarter

- Kamar Aiken 19-yard pass from Joe Flacco (Justin Tucker kick), 12:18. Ravens 7–0 Drive: 5 plays, 71 yards, 2:42
- Steve Smith 9-yard pass from Joe Flacco (Tucker kick), 4:44. Ravens 14–0 Drive: 11 plays, 79 yards, 6:00
- Tom Brady 4-yard run (Stephen Gostkowski kick), 0:48. Ravens 14–7 Drive: 8 plays, 78 yards, 3:56

Second quarter

- Danny Amendola 15-yard pass from Tom Brady (Gostkowski kick), 3:37. Tied 14–14 Drive: 10 plays, 67 yards, 3:36
- Owen Daniels 11-yard pass from Joe Flacco (Tucker kick), 0:10. Ravens 21–14 6 plays, 57 yards, 0:53

Third quarter

- Justin Forsett 16-yard pass from Joe Flacco (Tucker kick), 10:22. Ravens 28–14 Drive: 9 plays, 70 yards, 3:40
- Rob Gronkowski 5-yard pass from Tom Brady (Gostkowski kick), 6:48. Ravens 28–21 Drive: 9 plays, 80 yards, 3:34
- Danny Amendola 51-yard pass from Julian Edelman (Gostkowski kick), 4:20. Tied 28–28 Drive: 3 plays, 70 yards, 1:13

Fourth quarter

- Justin Tucker 25-yard field goal, 10:17. Ravens 31–28 Drive: 16 plays, 73 yards, 7:52
- Brandon LaFell 23-yard pass from Tom Brady (Gostkowski kick), 5:13. Patriots 35–31 Drive: 10 plays, 74 yards, 5:04

Top passers

- BAL – Joe Flacco: 28/45, 292 YDS, 4 TD, 2 INT
- NE – Tom Brady: 33/50, 367 YDS, 3 TD, 1 INT

Top rushers

- BAL – Justin Forsett: 24 CAR, 129 YDS
- NE – Brandon Bolden: 3 CAR, 7 YDS

Top receivers

- BAL – Torrey Smith: 3 REC, 62 YDS
- NE – Rob Gronkowski: 7 REC, 108 YDS, 1 TD

Top tacklers

- BAL – Rashaan Melvin: 11 TKL
- NE – Jamie Collins: 11 TKL

The Patriots became the third team in NFL history to erase two 14 point deficits to win a game (the last to do it was the 2003 Chiefs) and the first to pull off the feat in a playoff game, rallying from down 14–0 and 28–14 to win 35–31. Tom Brady threw for three touchdowns and ran in a fourth.

On the opening possession of the game, The Ravens stormed 71 yards in under three minutes to take a 7–0 lead, with Joe Flacco hitting rookie wide receiver Kamar Aiken on a 19-yard touchdown pass. After a Patriots three-and-out, Flacco drove the Ravens down the field once again, this time 79 yards in exactly six minutes, capping the drive with a 9-yard touchdown pass to Steve Smith, giving Baltimore a surprising 14–0 lead. The Patriots countered on their next drive. Aided by a 46-yard pass to Gronkowski, the Patriots drove 78 yards culminating in 8 plays with Brady tucking and running in a 4-yard touchdown, (in the process Brady tied Curtis Martin's club record for rushing touchdowns in the playoffs) with less than a minute remaining in the first quarter. Midway through the second quarter, the Patriots marched 67 yards in three-and-a half minutes to tie the game at 14–14 with a 15-yard touchdown pass to wide receiver Danny Amendola. A 23-yard completion to Gronkowski earlier on the drive gave Brady 6,595 career passing yards in the postseason, a new NFL record. The touchdown pass gave him 44 touchdown passes in the playoffs, tying him with Brett Favre with second behind only Montana (who has 45). After a Ravens three-and-out, with just over a minute remaining in the first half, Brady was intercepted by Ravens linebacker Daryl Smith at the Ravens 43 for no gain. On 2nd-and-10 from the Patriots 44, Flacco threw an incomplete pass intended for Steve Smith, but Revis was flagged for illegal contact, giving the Ravens a first down at the Patriots 24. Three plays later, Flacco hit tight end Owen Daniels for a touchdown to give the Ravens a 21–14 with 10 seconds remaining in the half. Brady took a knee to end the half. Amendola returned the second half kick 28 yards to the Patriots 26, but the Patriots were forced to punt after a Brady pass intended for Gronkowski fell incomplete, with a controversial pass interference no-call on Ravens rookie linebacker C. J. Mosley. The Ravens took advantage of the no-call and drove 70 yards with Flacco throwing a 16-yard touchdown pass to Ravens running back Justin Forsett out of the backfield, marking Flacco's fourth touchdown pass of the game and giving the Ravens the lead 28–14, their second 14-point lead of the game, quieting the Patriots once raucous crowd. The Patriots drove to the Ravens 24 on their next drive. A 14-yard catch by Michael Hoomanawanui gave the Patriots a first down at the Ravens 10 with an unsportsmanlike conduct penalty on the Ravens bench moving the ball to the 5. Two plays later, Brady found Gronk for the touchdown, trimming the deficit to 28–21 and tying him with Joe Montana for the most postseason touchdown passes. After a Ravens three-and-out, the Patriots needed just three plays to tie the game. Brady completed passes to Edelman and Vereen for 9 and 10 yards, respectively. Then, Brady threw a lateral pass to Edelman, who then proceeded to throw to a 51-yard touchdown pass to a wide-open Danny Amendola, in what was Edelman's first career passing touchdown, tying the game at 28–28. On the second play of the Ravens next drive, McCourty intercepted Flacco at the Ravens 37 for no gain. Despite the fantastic field position, the Patriots didn't gain a single yard, and they decided to punt rather than attempt a 55-yard field goal. Taking over with just over three minutes remaining in the third quarter, the Ravens marched 73 yards to the Patriots 7, in 16 plays. On third down, Daniels dropped a pass in the end zone from Flacco, thanks to excellent coverage by Patrick Chung, who was having a renaissance season, and the Ravens settled for a 25-yard field goal from Justin Tucker, taking a 31–28 lead fairly early in the fourth quarter. On the next drive, Brady led the Patriots down the field, with the drive culminating in a 23-yard touchdown pass to LaFell with 5:21, giving the Patriots their first lead of the game, 35–31. With the pass, Brady set a new NFL record with 46 career postseason touchdown passes. He also set franchise single-game postseason records in passing yards (367) and completions (33). On the ensuing drive, the Ravens were able to move the ball to the Patriots' 36-yard line. On 2nd-and-5, with 1:47 to go, Flacco was intercepted at the Patriots 1-yard line by Duron Harmon on a deep pass intended for Ravens receiver Torrey Smith. After three Patriots kneel downs following the interception, the Ravens called their last timeout with 14 seconds to go, necessitating a Patriots punt. On the final play of the game Flacco's desperation heave was batted out of the end zone, and was batted down around the 5-yard line, sealing the Patriots' victory, and sending them to their fourth consecutive AFC Championship Game.

The game saw several skirmishes between Patriot and Raven players, and controversy ensued when Ravens coach John Harbaugh accused the Patriots of using a formation that made unclear which receivers were eligible or ineligible, causing confusion on the field. The Patriots used this formation to gain a total of over 40 yards on their game-winning drive. Brady dismissed Harbaugh's comments in his postgame press conference. The NFL confirmed that the substitutions and plays by the Patriots were legal. Similar formations were used by the Jaguars, the Lions, and the Bengals during the season.

==== AFC Championship: vs. (4) Indianapolis Colts ====
AFC Championship: (4) Indianapolis Colts at (1) New England Patriots – Game summary

Quarter	1	2	3	4	Total
Colts	0	7	0	0	7
Patriots	14	3	21	7	45

at Gillette Stadium, Foxborough, Massachusetts

- Date: January 18, 2015
- Game time: 6:50 p.m. EST
- Game weather: 51 °F (11 °C), rain
- Game attendance: 68,756
- Referee: Walt Anderson
- TV announcers (CBS): Jim Nantz (play-by-play), Phil Simms (color commentator) and Tracy Wolfson (sideline reporter)
- Recap, Gamebook

Game information

First quarter

- LeGarrette Blount 1-yard run (Stephen Gostkowski kick), 10:15. Patriots 7–0 Drive: 6 plays, 26 yards, 2:12
- James Develin 1-yard pass from Tom Brady (Gostkowski kick), 1:20. Patriots 14–0 Drive: 8 plays, 59 yards, 3:30

Second quarter

- Zurlon Tipton 1-yard run (Adam Vinatieri kick), 4:54. Patriots 14–7 Drive: 10 plays, 93 yards, 4:17
- Stephen Gostkowski 21-yard field goal, 0:09. Patriots 17–7 Drive: 15 plays, 65 yards, 4:45

Third quarter

- Nate Solder 16-yard pass from Tom Brady (Gostkowski kick), 10:03. Patriots 24–7 Drive: 9 plays, 87 yards, 4:57
- Rob Gronkowski 5-yard pass from Tom Brady (Gostkowski kick), 3:19. Patriots 31–7 Drive: 8 plays, 62 yards, 5:36
- LeGarette Blount 13-yard run (Gostkowski kick), 2:08. Patriots 38–7 Drive: 1 play, 13 yards, 0:06

Fourth quarter

- LeGarrette Blount 1-yard run (Gostkowski kick), 10:05. Patriots 45–7 Drive: 11 plays, 40 yards, 6:10

Top passers

- IND – Andrew Luck: 12/33, 126 YDS, 2 INT
- NE – Tom Brady: 23/35, 226 YDS, 3 TD, 1 INT

Top rushers

- IND – Dan Herron: 10 CAR, 51 YDS
- NE – LeGarrette Blount: 30 CAR, 148 YDS, 3 TD

Top receivers

- IND – T. Y. Hilton: 1 REC, 36 YDS
- NE – Julian Edelman: 9 REC, 98 YDS

Top tacklers

- IND – Greg Toler: 10 TKL
- NE – Jamie Collins: 4 TKL

The Patriots faced the underdog Colts for the fourth time in just three seasons (the second time in the playoffs) looking to claim their sixth AFC Championship crown in a downpour at Gillette.

Both teams went three-and-out on their first drives of the game. As the Patriots punted on their first drive, Colts return-man, Josh Cribbs muffed the punt with the ball bouncing off his helmet and Darius Fleming recovering for the Patriots at the Colts 26. Five plays later, Blount appeared to score on a 4-yard touchdown run, but after official review was down short of the end zone, but Blount did score from 1-yard out on the very next play. The Colts drove 47 yards to the Patriots 34, but ex-Patriots Vinatieri missed wide-right on his 52-yard field goal attempt. With great field position at the Colts 47, aided by a 30-yard catch by Vereen, the Patriots took a 14–0 lead when Tom Brady hit fullback James Develin for a 1-yard touchdown late in the first quarter. Following a Colts punt, the Patriots marched 44 yards to the Colts 26, but D'Qwell Jackson intercepted Brady at the 1-yard line and returned it to the Colts 7. Aided by a 36-yard catch by T. Y. Hilton, the Colts marched 93 yards in 10 plays, scoring on a 1-yard touchdown run by Zurlon Tipton, trimming the deficit to 14–7. The Patriots countered, driving 65 yards to the Colts 3, but were forced to settle for a 21-yard field goal by Gostkowski, giving the Patriots 17–7 lead. Luck took a knee and the game went to halftime. Though it was a fairly even ballgame after a half of play, but the Patriots blew the top off in the second half. After receiving the kickoff, the Patriots stormed 87 yards in just 9 plays, with Brady hitting left tackle Nate Solder, in as an eligible receiver for the play, for a 16-yard touchdown increasing their lead to 24–7. It was Solder's first career reception and touchdown. As the defense continued to shut down Colt quarterback Andrew Luck, Brady and the offense continued to roll. After a Colts three-and-out, the Patriots marched 62 yards in 8 plays with Brady hitting Gronkowski for a 5-yard touchdown to run the lead to 31–7. The Colts next drive last only four plays with Darrelle Revis intercepted Luck, Revis' third career playoff interception, and returning it 30 yards to the Colts 13. On the very next play, Blount took it 13 yards to the endzone, his 2nd touchdown of the night, cementing the fate of the game at 38–7. Edelman returned the next Colts punt 45 yards to the Colts 45, with a penalty moving the ball 5 yards to the Colts 40. 11 plays and over six minutes later, Blount burrowed through for his third touchdown of the night. The run gave him 148 rushing yards for the game, second most in franchise history. On the next drive, Jamie Collins intercepted Luck. The next three drives were all three-and-outs before the Colts ran out the final 1:51.

Brady, extending his NFL record of playoff starts to 28, finished 23 of 35 for 226 yards three touchdowns and 1 interception. This was Brady's 7th career playoff game with 3 touchdowns, second only to Joe Montana's 9. Blount was once again the star for the Pats against the Colts, carrying the ball 30 times, a Patriots postseason record, for 148 yard and three touchdowns. Continuing a trend of poor play versus the Patriots, Luck completed an abysmal 12 of 33 passes for 126 yards, no touchdowns and 2 interceptions. For his career, Luck fell to 0–4 against the Patriots, including two playoff losses. They would lose 34–27 in 2015. In those four games, the Patriots have outscored the Colts 189–73. Luck has thrown 9 career interceptions in three games played at Gillette Stadium. This game is famous for the Deflategate scandal.

==== Super Bowl XLIX: vs. (N1) Seattle Seahawks ====
Super Bowl XLIX: (A1) New England Patriots vs. (N1) Seattle Seahawks – Game summary

Quarter	1	2	3	4	Total
Patriots	0	14	0	14	28
Seahawks	0	14	10	0	24

at University of Phoenix Stadium, Glendale, Arizona

- Date: February 1, 2015
- Game time: 6:30 p.m. EST/4:30 p.m. MST
- Game weather: 66 °F (19 °C), clear (retractable roof open)
- Game attendance: 70,288
- Referee: Bill Vinovich
- TV announcers (NBC): Al Michaels (play-by-play), Cris Collinsworth (color commentator) and Michele Tafoya (sideline reporter)
- Recap, Gamebook

Game information

First quarter

- None.

Second quarter

- NE – Brandon LaFell 11-yard pass from Tom Brady (Stephen Gostkowski kick), 9:47. Patriots 7–0 Drive: 9 plays, 65 yards, 4:10
- SEA – Marshawn Lynch 3-yard run (Steven Hauschka kick), 2:16. Tied 7–7 Drive: 8 plays, 70 yards, 4:51
- NE – Rob Gronkowski 22-yard pass from Tom Brady (Stephen Gostkowski kick), 0:31. Patriots 14–7 Drive: 8 plays, 80 yards, 1:45
- SEA – Chris Matthews 11-yard pass from Russell Wilson (Steven Hauschka kick), 0:02. Tied 14–14 Drive: 5 plays, 80 yards, 0:29

Third quarter

- SEA – Steven Hauschka 27-yard field goal, 11:09. Seahawks 17–14 Drive: 7 plays, 72 yards, 3:51
- SEA – Doug Baldwin 3-yard pass from Russell Wilson (Steven Hauschka kick), 4:54. Seahawks 24–14 Drive: 6 plays, 50 yards, 3:13

Fourth quarter

- NE – Danny Amendola 4-yard pass from Tom Brady (Stephen Gostkowski kick), 7:55. Seahawks 24–21 Drive: 9 plays, 68 yards, 4:15
- NE – Julian Edelman 3-yard pass from Tom Brady (Stephen Gostkowski kick), 2:02. Patriots 28–24 Drive: 10 plays, 64 yards, 4:50

Top passers

- NE – Tom Brady – 37/50, 328 YDS, 4 TD, 2 INT
- SEA – Russell Wilson – 12/21, 247 YDS, 2 TD, 1 INT

Top rushers

- NE – LeGarrette Blount – 14 CAR, 40 YDS
- SEA – Marshawn Lynch – 24 CAR, 102 YDS, TD

Top receivers

- NE – Julian Edelman – 9 REC, 109 YDS, TD
- SEA – Chris Matthews – 4 REC, 109 YDS, TD

Top tacklers

- NE – Jamie Collins – 8 TKL
- SEA – Bobby Wagner – 12 TKL

The Patriots faced the defending-Super Bowl champion Seattle Seahawks in Super Bowl 49. For the second year in a row the Seahawks boasted the #1 ranked defense (1st against the pass, 3rd against the run). This was the Patriots' first Super Bowl appearance since 2011, when they lost to the Giants. This was the stadium where the 18–0 Patriots lost to the Giants in Super Bowl XLII.

After both teams punted on their initial drive, the Patriots marched 58 yards in 13 plays, in just under 8 minutes, reaching the Seahawks 10-yard line, but on third and goal, facing a blitz, Brady was intercepted by Jeremy Lane in the end zone, who returned it to the Seahawks 15. Lane suffered a broken wrist on the play and didn't return to the game. The Seahawks were able to get their first first down on their next drive, but nothing more and punted. Taking over at their own 35, the Patriots struck first blood, marching 65 yards in 9 plays, converting a 3rd-and-9 with a 23-yard catch by Edelman, culminating with Brady hitting Brandon LaFell on an 11-yard touchdown pass. After trading three-and-outs, Seattle marched 70 yards in 8 plays, converting three third down, culminating with Marshawn Lynch plunging in from 3 yards out to tie the game 7–7. The Patriots countered, racing 80 yards in under two minutes and with Brady lofting a 22-yard touchdown pass to Gronkowski they retook the lead 14–7 with only 31 seconds left in the half. With only 31 second left in the half, it seemed like a foregone conclusion that the Seahawks would kneel to end the half; however, this was not the case. The ensuing Seahawks possession began with a 19-yard Robert Turbin run. Following a 17-yard Russell Wilson scramble to the Patriots 44, Wilson lofted a 23-yard completion Ricardo Lockette and, with an additional 10 yards on a Kyle Arrington facemask penalty, moved the ball to the Patriots' 11-yard line with 0:06 seconds remaining in the half. Wilson then hit Chris Matthews for the touchdown, the first of the latter's career, tying the game at 14–14 at halftime. The Seahawks marched 72 yards to the Patriots 8 line on the first drive of the second half, but the Patriots defense stiffened and held them to a 27-yard field goal by Steven Hauschka, giving the Seahawks their first lead of the game, 17–14. On the Patriots first drive, facing a 3rd-and-9 from their own 32, linebacker Bobby Wagner intercepted Brady's pass, intended for Rob Gronkowski, and returned it 6 yards to the Patriots 34. An illegal contact penalty on Richard Sherman moved the ball to midfield, but it didn't stop the Seahawks. Wilson hit Doug Baldwin on a 3-yard touchdown pass wide open in the back of the end zone, increasing the Seahawks lead to 24–14. Baldwin was later fined for an obscene gesture after the play. Sherman was also scene mocking Darrelle Revis (who was covering Baldwin) after the play. Seattle looked to be taking over, forcing the Patriots to a three-and-out. They drove to the Patriots 47, but Wilson threw an incomplete pass intended for Jermaine Kearse on 3rd-and-2. Once again though, the Seahawks forced the Patriots to a three-and-out after stuffing LeGarrette Blount for a 1-yard loss on 3rd-and-1. Facing their largest 4th quarter deficit in a Super Bowl during the Brady-Belichick era, the Patriots appeared finished, but Rob Ninkovich sacked Wilson for an 8-yard loss on 3rd-and-7, forcing Seattle to punt. Bruce Irvin sacked Brady for an 8-yard loss on first down. Two plays later, facing a 3rd-and-14, Brady completed a 21-yard pass to Edelman for a first down to their own 49. A 9-yard completion to Vereen coupled with an unnecessary roughness penalty on Earl Thomas moved the ball to the Seahawks 27. Three plays later, Brady found Edelman again, for another 21 yard gain on 3rd-and-14. Two plays later, Brady found Amendola for a 4-yard touchdown pass, trimming the deficit to 24–21. The Seahawks went three-and-out on their next drive, giving the Patriots the ball on their own 36-yard line with 6:52 remaining. Tom Brady completed all of his eight pass attempts on the drive, marching the Patriots 64 yards, culminating in a 3-yard touchdown pass to Julian Edelman with 2:02 left to retake the lead, Brady's fourth touchdown pass of the evening. However, Seattle had 2 minutes and a full complement of timeouts at their disposal. On the first play of the ensuing Seahawk possession, Russell Wilson hit Lynch on a 31-yard catch-and-run to the Patriots 49. Two plays later, on 3rd-and-10, Wilson found Lockette for an 11-yard gain to the Patriots 38. On the next play with 1:13 remaining, Kearse caught a 33-yard pass that bounced off of his body multiple times (which has been compared to the David Tyree helmet catch which also came against the Patriots at University of Phoenix Stadium). The Seahawks now had the ball at the Patriots' 5-yard line. Marshawn Lynch carried the ball to the 1-yard line on the next play, setting up 2nd and goal at the 1-yard line. On the next play, Wilson's pass, intended for Ricardo Lockette, was intercepted by undrafted free-agent rookie Malcolm Butler on the goal line with 20 seconds remaining. Butler also made a big play two plays earlier, he was the only one who had the presence of mind to push Kearse out of bounds after his catch. After taking over possession at their own 1-yard line, the Patriots induced an offsides penalty on Seattle defensive end Michael Bennett. A brawl broke out between the two teams after that, resulting in the ejection of Irvin, and fines against Bennett, Gronkowski and Michael Hoomanawanui. The Patriots took a knee, killing the clock, winning their fourth Super Bowl championship; their first since Super Bowl XXXIX, ten years earlier. Pete Carroll suffered severe backlash for failing to change Darrell Bevell's final play call on the goal line. This controversy sparked multiple memes and even a commercial which featured Marshawn Lynch saying, "you should've ran the ball."

Tom Brady was named Super Bowl MVP (his third, tying Joe Montana for most all time) after completing 37 of 50 passes for 328 yards, with 4 touchdowns and 2 interceptions. Brady was 13 of 15 for 124 yards, two touchdowns, no interceptions, and a 140.7 passer rating with a QBR of 97.0 in the 4th quarter. Brady tied Montana and Terry Bradshaw for most Super Bowl victories by a quarterback, with four. Blount was a non-factor with just 40 yards on just 14 carries. Edelman was the top receiver of the game with 9 catches for 109 yards and 1 touchdown with three huge third-down catches. Russell Wilson was 12 of 21 for 247 yards, 2 TDs and 1 INT and added 39 yards on 3 carries. Rob Gronkowski had 6 catches for 68 yards and 1 touchdown. Shane Vereen led all players in receptions, with 11 catches for 64 yards, while Seattle counterpart Marshawn Lynch had 102 yards on 24 carries and 1 touchdown. Receiver Danny Amendola had 5 catches for 48 yards and 1 touchdown. Chris Matthews broke out with 4 catches for 109 yards and a touchdown. As of 2025, this is the Patriots last win over the Seahawks.

== Standings ==
=== Division ===
AFC East
	W	L	T	PCT	DIV	CONF	PF	PA	STK
^{(1)} New England Patriots	12	4	0	.750	4–2	9–3	468	313	L1
Buffalo Bills	9	7	0	.563	4–2	5–7	343	289	W1
Miami Dolphins	8	8	0	.500	3–3	6–6	388	373	L1
New York Jets	4	12	0	.250	1–5	4–8	283	401	W1

=== Conference ===
AFC
#	Team	Division	W	L	T	PCT	DIV	CONF	SOS	SOV	STK
Division leaders
1 (Note: New England defeated Denver head-to-head (Week 9, 43–21).)	New England Patriots	East	12	4	0	.750	4–2	9–3	.514	.487	L1
2	Denver Broncos	West	12	4	0	.750	6–0	10–2	.521	.484	W1
3 (Note: Pittsburgh defeated Indianapolis head-to-head (Week 8, 51–34).)	Pittsburgh Steelers	North	11	5	0	.688	4–2	9–3	.451	.486	W4
4	Indianapolis Colts	South	11	5	0	.688	6–0	9–3	.479	.372	W1
Wild Cards
5	Cincinnati Bengals	North	10	5	1	.656	3–3	7–5	.498	.425	L1
6	Baltimore Ravens	North	10	6	0	.625	3–3	6–6	.475	.378	W1
Did not qualify for the postseason
7 (Note: Kansas City finished ahead of San Diego in the AFC West based on head-to-head sweep (Week 7, 23–20; Week 17, 19–7). Houston finished ahead of Kansas City and Buffalo based on conference record. Kansas City finished ahead of Buffalo based on head-to-head victory (Week 10, 17–13). San Diego finished ahead of Buffalo based on head-to-head victory (Week 3, 22–10).)	Houston Texans	South	9	7	0	.563	4–2	8–4	.447	.299	W2
8	Kansas City Chiefs	West	9	7	0	.563	3–3	7–5	.512	.500	W1
9	San Diego Chargers	West	9	7	0	.563	2–4	6–6	.512	.403	L1
10	Buffalo Bills	East	9	7	0	.563	4–2	5–7	.516	.486	W1
11	Miami Dolphins	East	8	8	0	.500	3–3	6–6	.512	.406	L1
12	Cleveland Browns	North	7	9	0	.438	2–4	4–8	.479	.371	L5
13	New York Jets	East	4	12	0	.250	1–5	4–8	.543	.375	W1
14 (Note: Jacksonville finished ahead of Oakland based on record vs. common opponents (1–4 to 0–5).)	Jacksonville Jaguars	South	3	13	0	.188	1–5	2–10	.514	.313	L1
15	Oakland Raiders	West	3	13	0	.188	1–5	2–10	.570	.542	L1
16	Tennessee Titans	South	2	14	0	.125	1–5	2–10	.506	.375	L10
Tiebreakers (Note: When breaking ties for three or more teams under the NFL's rules, they are first broken within divisions, then comparing only the highest ranked remaining team from each division.)

== See also ==
- Deflategate
