= Zach Moore =

American football player (born 1990)

No. 90, 91, 76, 56
- Position: Defensive end

Personal information
- Born: September 5, 1990 (age 36); Chicago, Illinois, U.S.
- Listed height: 6 ft 6 in (1.98 m)
- Listed weight: 275 lb (125 kg)

Career information
- High school: Simeon (Chicago)
- College: Concordia (MN)
- NFL draft: 2014: 6th round, 198th overall pick

Career history
- New England Patriots (2014); Minnesota Vikings (2015); Dallas Cowboys (2016); San Francisco 49ers (2016); Carolina Panthers (2017); Arizona Cardinals (2018)

Awards and highlights
- Super Bowl champion (XLIX); Division II All-American (2012, 2013); 3× First-team All-NSIC (2010, 2012, 2013)

Career NFL statistics
- Total tackles: 17
- Sacks: 4
- Forced fumbles: 1
- Fumble recoveries: 1
- Stats at Pro Football Reference

Zach Moore (born September 5, 1990) is an American former professional football player who was a defensive end in the National Football League (NFL). He was selected by the New England Patriots in the sixth round, 198th overall, of the 2014 NFL draft. He played college football for the Concordia Golden Bears in St. Paul, Minnesota, where he led the defense with 14 sacks in 2012.

== Early life ==
A native of Chicago, Illinois, Moore attended Simeon Career Academy in Chatham, where he played primarily offensive tackle as an underclassman due to his 6'6" frame. He was selected to Illinois Top 100 Players, was a Chicago 5-star recruit and was ranked in the Illinois Prairie State Top Five. He was named All-City First-team and All-State. He also competed in track & field for the Wolverines.

He moved on to Division II Concordia University, where he focused on playing defensive end. He became a starter as a sophomore, registering 42 tackles (11.5 for loss) and 10 sacks. The next year, he was redshirted and did not play.

In 2012, he tallied 14 sacks and 21 tackles for loss. As a senior, he posted 33 tackles (9.5 for loss), 7 sacks, 12 quarterback hurries, 2 forced fumbles, 2 fumble recoveries, 3 passes defensed, and one blocked kick. He set the school record in career sacks (33) and finished third all-time in tackles for loss (45).

== Professional career ==
Pre-draft measurables
Height	Weight	40-yard dash	10-yard split	20-yard split	20-yard shuttle	Three-cone drill	Vertical jump	Broad jump	Bench press
6 ft 5 1/2 in (1.97 m)	269 lb (122 kg)	4.84 s	1.67 s	2.80 s	4.46 s	7.41 s	33 1/2 in (0.85 m)	10 ft 3 in (3.12 m)	23 reps
All values from NFL Combine

=== New England Patriots ===
Moore was selected in the sixth round (198th overall) of the 2014 NFL draft by the New England Patriots, becoming Concordia-St. Paul's first player to be selected in the NFL draft.

During the 2014 season, Moore was active for eight regular season games, and did not play in any of the team's postseason contests, including their Super Bowl XLIX victory over the Seattle Seahawks, becoming Concordia-St.Paul's first Super Bowl champion.

In his limited snaps, Moore recorded only three tackles, but did record a half-sack (along with Dont'a Hightower) and forced fumble of Chicago Bears quarterback Jay Cutler, which was returned for a touchdown by Rob Ninkovich. Moore also recovered a C. J. Spiller fumble against the Buffalo Bills.

Moore was released by the Patriots on September 5, 2015.

=== Minnesota Vikings ===
On September 5, 2015, Moore was signed by the Minnesota Vikings to the practice squad, moving back to the state where his college career took place. On December 19, Moore was promoted to the 53-man roster. On September 3, 2016, he was released as part of the team's final roster cuts.

=== Dallas Cowboys ===
On September 6, 2016, Moore was signed to the Dallas Cowboys' practice squad. He was promoted to the active roster on December 16, when the team was forced to play him against the Tampa Bay Buccaneers, because of injuries to DeMarcus Lawrence and Cedric Thornton. He was released on December 26, to make room for defensive end Randy Gregory, who was coming off a suspension.

=== San Francisco 49ers ===
On December 27, 2016, Moore was claimed off waivers by the San Francisco 49ers, in order to secure his rights for the 2017 season. He was declared inactive for the last game of the regular season. On May 2, 2017, Moore was waived by the 49ers.

=== Carolina Panthers ===
On May 3, 2017, Moore was claimed off waivers by the Carolina Panthers. He was waived on September 2, 2017, and was signed to the Panthers' practice squad the next day. He was promoted to the active roster on December 2, 2017.

On September 1, 2018, Moore was released by the Panthers.

=== Arizona Cardinals ===
On September 2, 2018, the Cardinals claimed Moore off of waivers. He played in all 16 games recording 14 tackles and 3.5 sacks.
