= Danny Aiken =

American football player (born 1988)

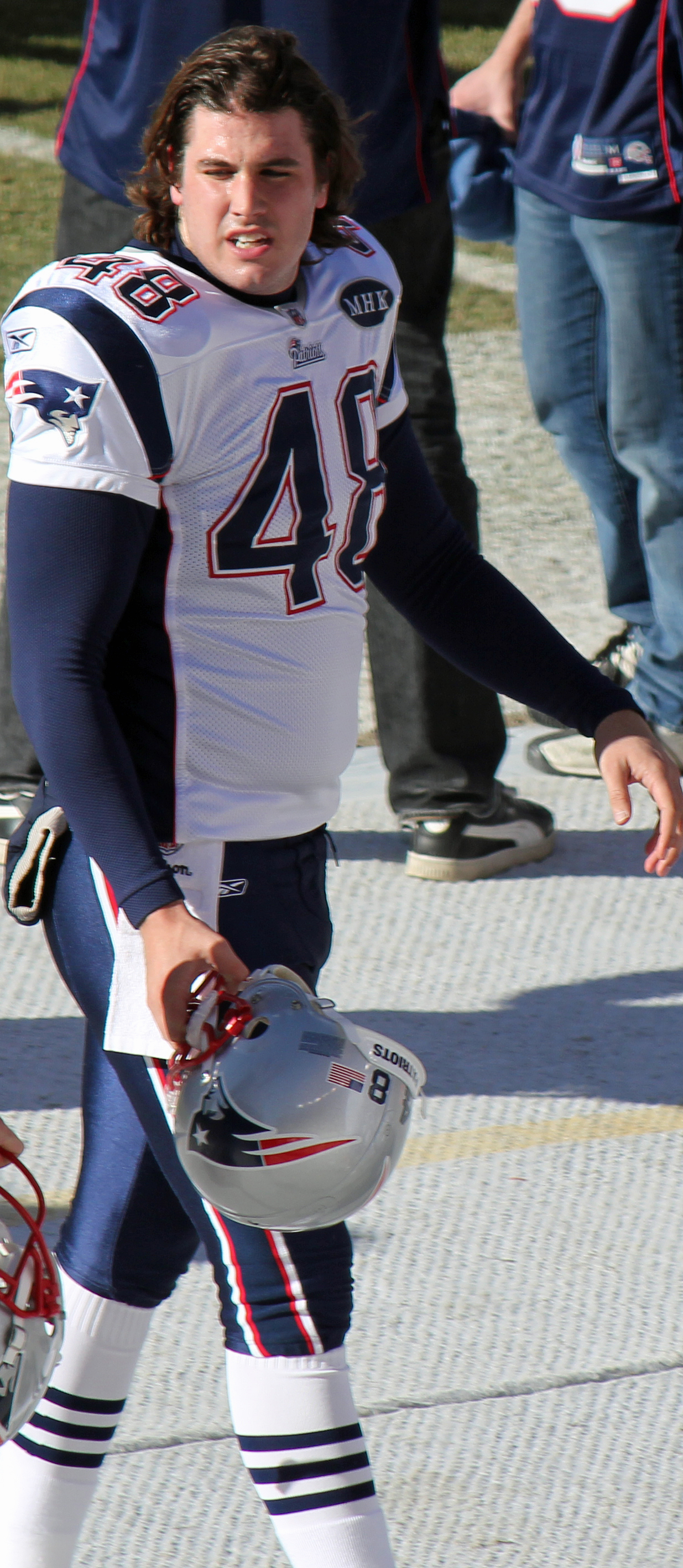
- Aiken with the New England Patriots in 2011

No. 48, 57
- Position: Long snapper

Personal information
- Born: August 28, 1988 (age 38); Oxford, Connecticut, U.S.
- Listed height: 6 ft 4 in (1.93 m)
- Listed weight: 255 lb (116 kg)

Career information
- High school: Cave Spring (Roanoke, Virginia)
- College: Virginia (2007–2010)
- NFL draft: 2011: undrafted

Career history

Playing
- Buffalo Bills (2011)*; New England Patriots (2011–2014); Carolina Panthers (2015); New York Giants (2015)
- * Offseason or practice squad member only

Coaching
- Virginia Episcopal School (2018–2019) Head coach

Awards and highlights
- Super Bowl champion (XLIX)

Career NFL statistics
- Games played: 66
- Total tackles: 10
- Stats at Pro Football Reference

Daniel Lee Aiken (born August 28, 1988) is an American former professional football player who was a long snapper in the National Football League (NFL). He was signed by the Buffalo Bills as an undrafted free agent in 2011. He played college football for the Virginia Cavaliers after a prep year at Fork Union Military Academy.

== Early life ==
While attending Cave Spring High School, Aiken lettered in football. During his high school career, he played on the defensive line, at quarterback, and in his early years on junior varsity he played offensive line. At quarterback in his senior year, he led the Knights to a 9–1 regular season record. Their only loss coming against the Salem Spartans (state champions that year) who won the game 7–6 in a controversial finish. The Knights finished the year with a 1–1 playoff record, defeating Brookville (led by future Virginia Tech quarterback Logan Thomas) in the regional semifinals before falling in the regional championship game to top-seeded and undefeated Liberty, finishing the season at 10–2.

He attended Fork Union Military Academy as a postgraduate, where he gained experience as a long snapper.

== College career ==
He played college football at the University of Virginia, was the team's long snapper all four years, and was a reserve tight end but caught no passes while there, he played under coach Mike London.

== NFL career ==
Pre-draft measurables
Height	Weight	Arm length	Hand span	40-yard dash	10-yard split	20-yard split	20-yard shuttle	Three-cone drill	Vertical jump	Broad jump	Bench press
6 ft 4 1/4 in (1.94 m)	244 lb (111 kg)	32 1/4 in (0.82 m)	9 1/2 in (0.24 m)	5.00 s	1.80 s	2.94 s	4.67 s	7.45 s	32.0 in (0.81 m)	8 ft 8 in (2.64 m)	13 reps

=== Buffalo Bills ===
In May 2011, the Buffalo Bills signed him as an undrafted free agent, he was waived by the team in August 2011.

=== New England Patriots ===
The New England Patriots claimed him off waivers on September 4, 2011, and he was named the team's starting long snapper and an emergency tight end.

On March 7, 2014, Aiken was re-signed to a 1-year contract. He was released from the team on August 30, 2014, but re-signed on September 4. On February 1, 2015, Aiken won Super Bowl XLIX with the Patriots. At the conclusion of the 2014–2015 season Aiken was not resigned by the Patriots due to back surgery and their drafting of Joe Cardona in the 2015 NFL draft to be the team's new long snapper.

=== Carolina Panthers ===
Aiken was signed by the Carolina Panthers on November 25, 2015, after an injury to the Panthers long snapper J. J. Jansen. On November 27, 2015, Aiken was waived.

=== New York Giants ===
On December 8, 2015, Aiken was signed as a free agent by the New York Giants to replace long snapper Zak DeOssie, who suffered a wrist injury and was placed on season-ending injured reserve. On December 31, 2015, Aiken was placed on season-ending injured reserve due to a thumb injury, and was replaced by Tyler Ott.

== Personal life ==
Aiken is currently married to Kelly Pierson Aiken. While not officially retired from the NFL, Aiken became the head coach of the Virginia Episcopal School football team for the 2018 season.
