= Logan Thomas =

American football player (born 1991)

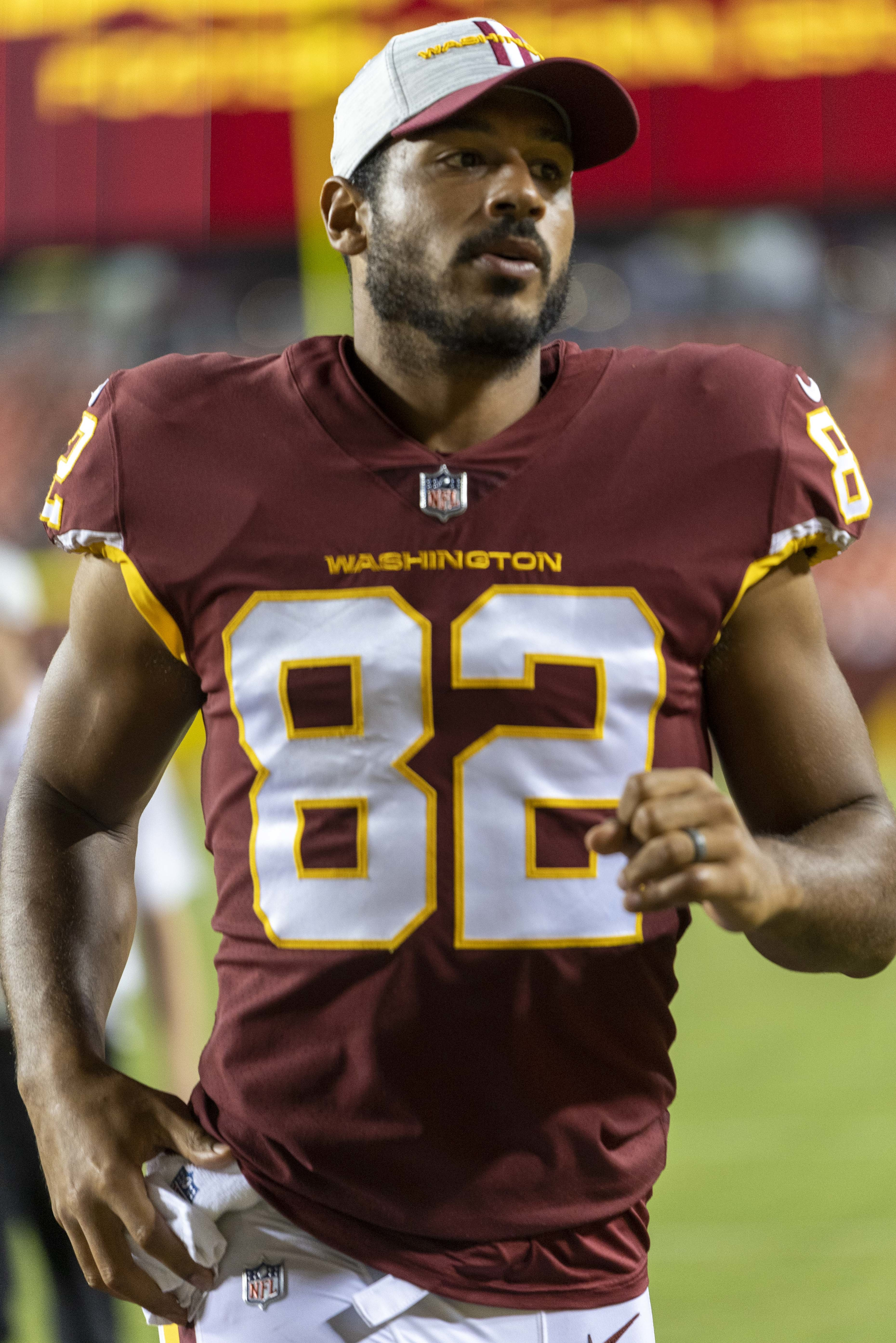
- Thomas with the Washington Football Team in 2021

No. 6, 82
- Position: Tight end

Personal information
- Born: July 1, 1991 (age 35); Lynchburg, Virginia, U.S.
- Listed height: 6 ft 6 in (1.98 m)
- Listed weight: 250 lb (113 kg)

Career information
- High school: Brookville (Lynchburg)
- College: Virginia Tech (2009–2013)
- NFL draft: 2014: 4th round, 120th overall pick

Career history
- Arizona Cardinals (2014); Miami Dolphins (2015); New York Giants (2016)*; Detroit Lions (2016)*; Buffalo Bills (2016–2018); Detroit Lions (2019); Washington Football Team / Commanders (2020–2023); San Francisco 49ers (2024)*
- * Offseason or practice squad member only

Awards and highlights
- Second-team All-ACC (2011)

Career NFL statistics
- Receptions: 219
- Receiving yards: 2,002
- Receiving touchdowns: 16
- Stats at Pro Football Reference

Logan Lamont Thomas Sr. (born July 1, 1991) is an American former professional football player who was a tight end in the National Football League (NFL). He was the starting quarterback while playing college football for the Virginia Tech Hokies in the early 2010s, where he finished as the school's all-time leader in passing yards and touchdowns before being selected by the Arizona Cardinals in the fourth round of the 2014 NFL draft.

Thomas spent time as a reserve quarterback for the Cardinals, Miami Dolphins and New York Giants. He switched to tight end, a position he last played in high school, with the Detroit Lions in 2016 and continued the role with the Buffalo Bills and Washington Football Team / Commanders.

== Early life ==
Thomas attended Brookville High School in Lynchburg, Virginia. He played quarterback, wide receiver, tight end, and defensive back for the Bees' football team. As a quarterback in his senior year, he completed 118-of-204 passes for 1,535 yards and 20 passing touchdowns, and had 842 rushing yards and 11 rushing touchdowns. On defense, he recorded 80 tackles and four interceptions. He played in the 2009 U.S. Army All-American Bowl. A four-star recruit, Thomas committed to play football at Virginia Tech over several other offers.

In addition to football, Thomas also competed in track and field for his junior and senior years at Brookville. He earned All-state honors in the 110m hurdles (14.95 s), the 300m hurdles (41.03 s), the high jump (1.96 m), and in discus (48 m). He won the long jump event at the 2009 Seminole District Outdoor T&F Championships.

== College career ==
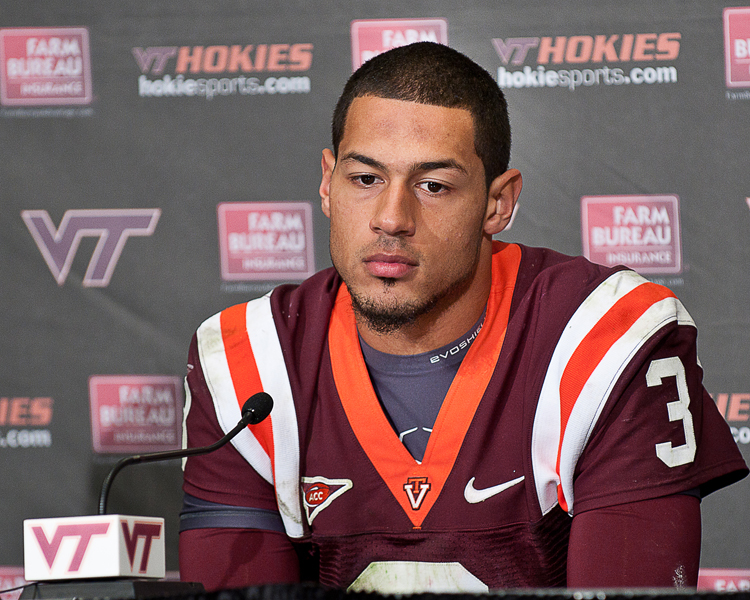
Thomas with Virginia Tech in 2011

After being redshirted in 2009, Thomas spent 2010 as the backup quarterback to Tyrod Taylor, appearing in seven games. He completed 12-of-26 passes for 107 yards and 22 rushing yards on six attempts. He also had a two-yard receiving touchdown on his lone reception of the season.

Thomas took over as the starter in 2011, and started in all fourteen games. He finished the season throwing for 3,013 yards and 19 touchdowns, while also contributing 469 rushing yards and 11 rushing touchdowns.

In 2012, Thomas completed 220-of-449 passes for 2,976 yards and 18 touchdowns while committing 16 interceptions. He also rushed for 528 yards and 9 touchdowns.

As a senior in 2013, he threw for 2,907 yards with 16 touchdowns and 13 interceptions.

== Professional career ==
Pre-draft measurables
| Height | Weight | Arm length | Hand span | Wingspan | 40-yard dash | 10-yard split | 20-yard split | 20-yard shuttle | Three-cone drill | Vertical jump | Broad jump | Wonderlic |
|---|---|---|---|---|---|---|---|---|---|---|---|---|
| 6 ft 6 1/8 in (1.98 m) | 248 lb (112 kg) | 34 1/4 in (0.87 m) | 10 7/8 in (0.28 m) | 6 ft 8 1/2 in (2.04 m) | 4.61 s | 1.63 s | 2.70 s | 4.18 s | 7.05 s | 35.5 in (0.90 m) | 9 ft 10 in (3.00 m) | 29 |
All values from NFL Combine

=== Arizona Cardinals ===
He was selected in the fourth round, 120th overall, of the 2014 NFL draft by the Arizona Cardinals. Thomas was the sixth quarterback taken in the draft behind Blake Bortles (3rd, Jacksonville Jaguars), Johnny Manziel (22nd, Cleveland Browns), Teddy Bridgewater (32nd, Minnesota Vikings), Derek Carr (36th, Oakland Raiders), and Jimmy Garoppolo (62nd, New England Patriots). He signed his four-year rookie contract on May 21, 2014.

Thomas made his NFL debut against the Denver Broncos on October 5 in relief of concussed starter Drew Stanton. Thomas completed his third career NFL pass for an 81-yard touchdown to running back Andre Ellington. Thomas became the first NFL quarterback to have his first career completion go for 80+ yards since Steelers' Neil O'Donnell in 1991. Thomas finished the game completing a single pass in eight attempts as the Cardinals were defeated by the Broncos 41–20. After Week 16 and after the Cardinals' one-sided loss to the Seattle Seahawks, head coach Bruce Arians announced that rookie Thomas would start over struggling Ryan Lindley in the regular season finale against division rival San Francisco 49ers, but "promised to have a quick hook." Arians later announced that the team would start Lindley.

Thomas was released on September 5, 2015.

=== Miami Dolphins ===
Thomas was claimed off waivers by the Miami Dolphins on September 6, 2015, and released Thomas on September 11. He was re-signed to their practice squad on September 15.

On December 16, he was elevated from the practice squad to the active roster.

The Dolphins waived Thomas on June 16, 2016.

=== New York Giants ===
On June 17, 2016, Thomas was claimed off waivers by the New York Giants. On September 3, he was released by the Giants and signed to their practice squad the following day. Thomas was on and off the Giants' practice squad throughout the first three months of the season, before being released on November 22; he had a total of 13 transactions with the team.

=== Detroit Lions (first stint) ===
Thomas switched to tight end and was signed to the Detroit Lions' practice squad on November 28, 2016.

=== Buffalo Bills ===
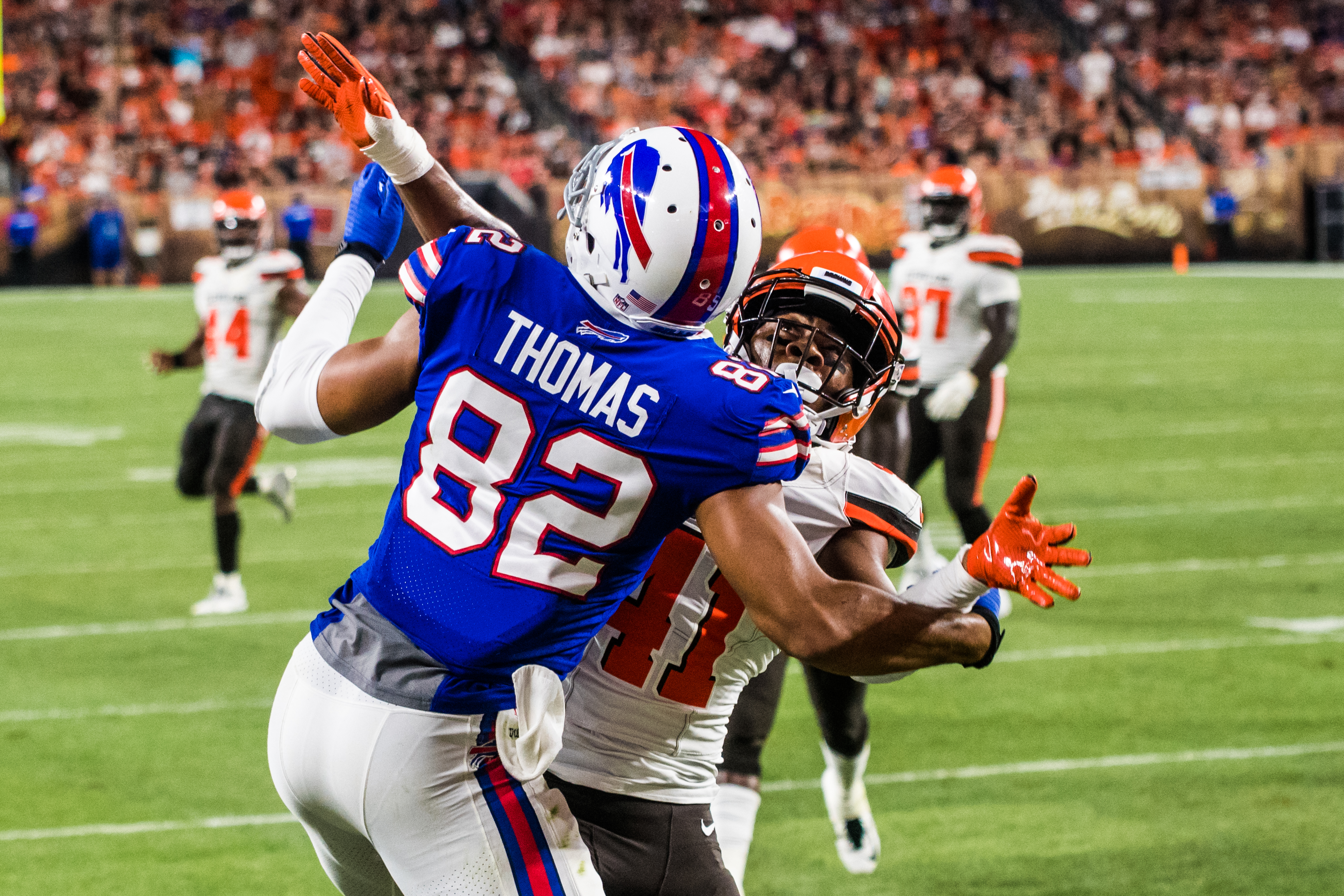
Thomas during a game with the Buffalo Bills in 2018

On November 30, 2016, the Buffalo Bills signed Thomas off the Lions' practice squad.

He gained significant playing time in 2017 after fellow tight end Charles Clay was sidelined with a knee injury. On October 22, 2017, he caught his first NFL touchdown, a 22-yard pass from former Virginia Tech teammate Tyrod Taylor, in a home win against the Tampa Bay Buccaneers. It was the second time that they connected for a touchdown, the first being in their college days.

Thomas finished the 2018 season with 12 receptions for 77 yards in 12 games with 3 starts. He also completed his first pass attempt since his time as a quarterback in Arizona, connecting with wide receiver Robert Foster for 16 yards on a fake punt play for a first down.

=== Detroit Lions (second stint) ===
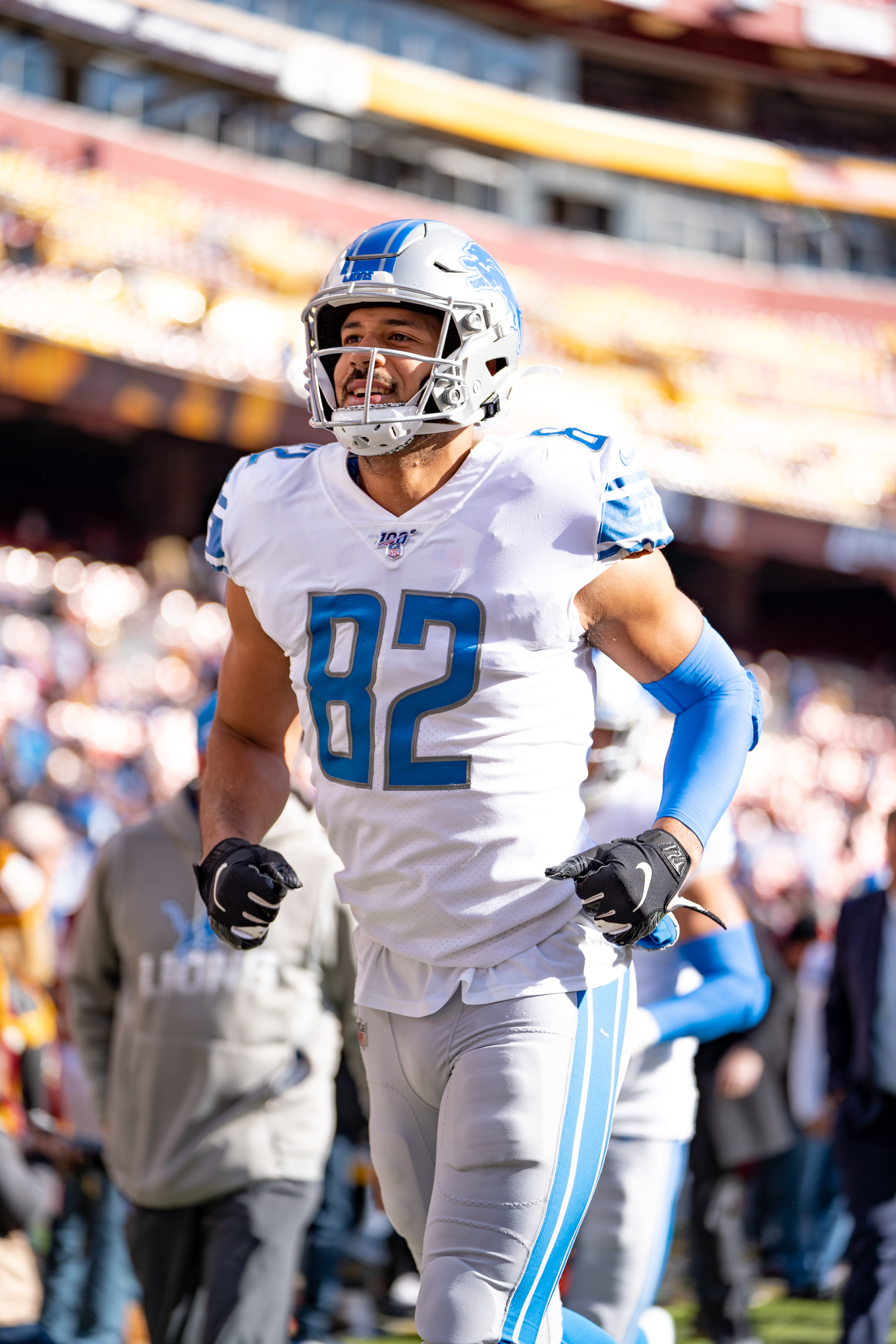
Thomas playing for the Detroit Lions in 2019

On March 21, 2019, Thomas was signed for the second time by the Lions. He was released on September 1, but re-signed the following day. He played in all 16 games with three starts, finishing the season with 16 receptions for 173 receiving yards and one receiving touchdown.

=== Washington Redskins / Football Team / Commanders ===
On March 23, 2020, Thomas signed with the Washington Redskins. He was placed on the reserve/COVID-19 list for the start of training camp before being activated on August 9. In Week 13 against the Pittsburgh Steelers, Thomas recorded 9 catches for 98 yards and a touchdown during the 23–17 win. He finished the 2020 season with 72 receptions for 670 yards and six touchdowns.

On July 28, 2021, Thomas signed a three-year contract extension worth $24 million. In a Week 4 game against the Atlanta Falcons, Thomas left in the first quarter due to a hamstring injury. He was placed on injured reserve after the game, and re-joined the active roster on November 29 after missing six games. On December 8, he was placed on injured reserve for a second time after suffering a knee injury via a low block from Las Vegas Raiders' defensive end Yannick Ngakoue three days earlier. Logan finished the 2021 season with 18 receptions for 196 yards and three touchdowns over six games with as many starts.

In 2022, Thomas was placed on the active/physically unable to perform list at the start of training camp; he was activated on August 22. He finished the season with 39 receptions for 323 yards and one touchdown (against his former Lions) over 14 games with 13 starts.

In 2023, in a Week 2 win over the Denver Broncos, Thomas left the game with a concussion after scoring a touchdown and receiving an illegal helmet-to-helmet hit from safety Kareem Jackson. He only missed the following game. Thomas finished the season with 55 receptions for 496 yards and four touchdowns (as well as a 2-point conversion in a loss to the Miami Dolphins) and 2 lost fumbles over 16 games with 15 starts.

He was released on March 1, 2024.

=== San Francisco 49ers ===
On June 4, 2024, Thomas signed a one-year contract with the San Francisco 49ers. He was released on August 27.

== Career statistics ==
=== NFL ===
| Year | Team | Games | | Receiving | | | | | Passing | | | | | | | |
| Year | Team | GP | GS | Rec | Yds | Avg | Lng | TD | Cmp | Att | Pct | Yds | Y/A | TD | Int | Rtg |
|---|---|---|---|---|---|---|---|---|---|---|---|---|---|---|---|---|
| 2014 | ARI | 2 | 0 | – | – | – | – | – | 1 | 9 | 11.1 | 81 | 9 | 1 | 0 | 101.6 |
| 2017 | BUF | 12 | 2 | 7 | 67 | 9.6 | 22 | 1 | – | – | – | – | – | – | – | – |
| 2018 | BUF | 12 | 3 | 12 | 77 | 6.4 | 24 | 0 | 1 | 1 | 100.0 | 15 | 15 | 0 | 0 | 118.7 |
| 2019 | DET | 16 | 3 | 16 | 173 | 10.8 | 17 | 1 | – | – | – | – | – | – | – | – |
| 2020 | WAS | 16 | 15 | 72 | 670 | 9.3 | 30 | 6 | 1 | 1 | 100.0 | 28 | 28 | 0 | 0 | 118.7 |
| 2021 | WAS | 6 | 6 | 18 | 196 | 10.9 | 35 | 3 | – | – | – | – | – | – | – | – |
| 2022 | WAS | 14 | 13 | 39 | 323 | 8.3 | 27 | 1 | – | – | – | – | – | – | – | – |
| 2023 | WAS | 16 | 15 | 55 | 496 | 9.0 | 29 | 4 | – | – | – | – | – | – | – | – |
| Total | | 94 | 57 | 219 | 2,002 | 9.1 | 35 | 16 | 3 | 11 | 27.3 | 124 | 11.3 | 1 | 0 | 104.4 |

=== College ===
College statistics
| Season | Passing | | | | | | | | Rushing | | | |
| Season | Cmp | Att | Pct | Yds | Y/A | TD | Int | Rtg | Att | Yds | Avg | TD |
|---|---|---|---|---|---|---|---|---|---|---|---|---|
| 2010 | 12 | 26 | 46.2 | 107 | 4.1 | 0 | 0 | 80.7 | 6 | 22 | 3.7 | 0 |
| 2011 | 234 | 391 | 59.8 | 3,013 | 7.7 | 19 | 10 | 135.5 | 153 | 469 | 3.1 | 11 |
| 2012 | 220 | 429 | 51.3 | 2,976 | 6.9 | 18 | 16 | 115.9 | 174 | 524 | 3 | 9 |
| 2013 | 227 | 402 | 56.5 | 2,907 | 7.2 | 15 | 13 | 123.1 | 162 | 344 | 2.1 | 4 |
| Career | 693 | 1,248 | 55.5 | 9,003 | 7.2 | 52 | 39 | 123.6 | 495 | 1,359 | 2.7 | 24 |

== Personal life ==
Thomas is married with five sons.

Awards and achievements
| Preceded by Tyrod Taylor | Virginia Tech career passing record 2013–present (9,003 yards) | Succeeded by current |
| Preceded by Bryan Randall | Virginia Tech career passing touchdown record 2013–present (53) | Succeeded by current |
| Preceded by Tyrod Taylor | Virginia Tech career total offense record 2013–present (10,362 yards) | Succeeded by current |
| Preceded by Tyrod Taylor | Virginia Tech career total touchdown record 2013–present (77) | Succeeded by current |
