= 2018 Buffalo Bills season =

59th season in franchise history

- Owner: Terry and Kim Pegula
- General manager: Brandon Beane
- Head coach: Sean McDermott
- Home stadium: New Era Field

Results
- Record: 6–10
- Division place: 3rd AFC East
- Playoffs: Did not qualify
- Pro Bowlers: DT Kyle Williams

Uniform
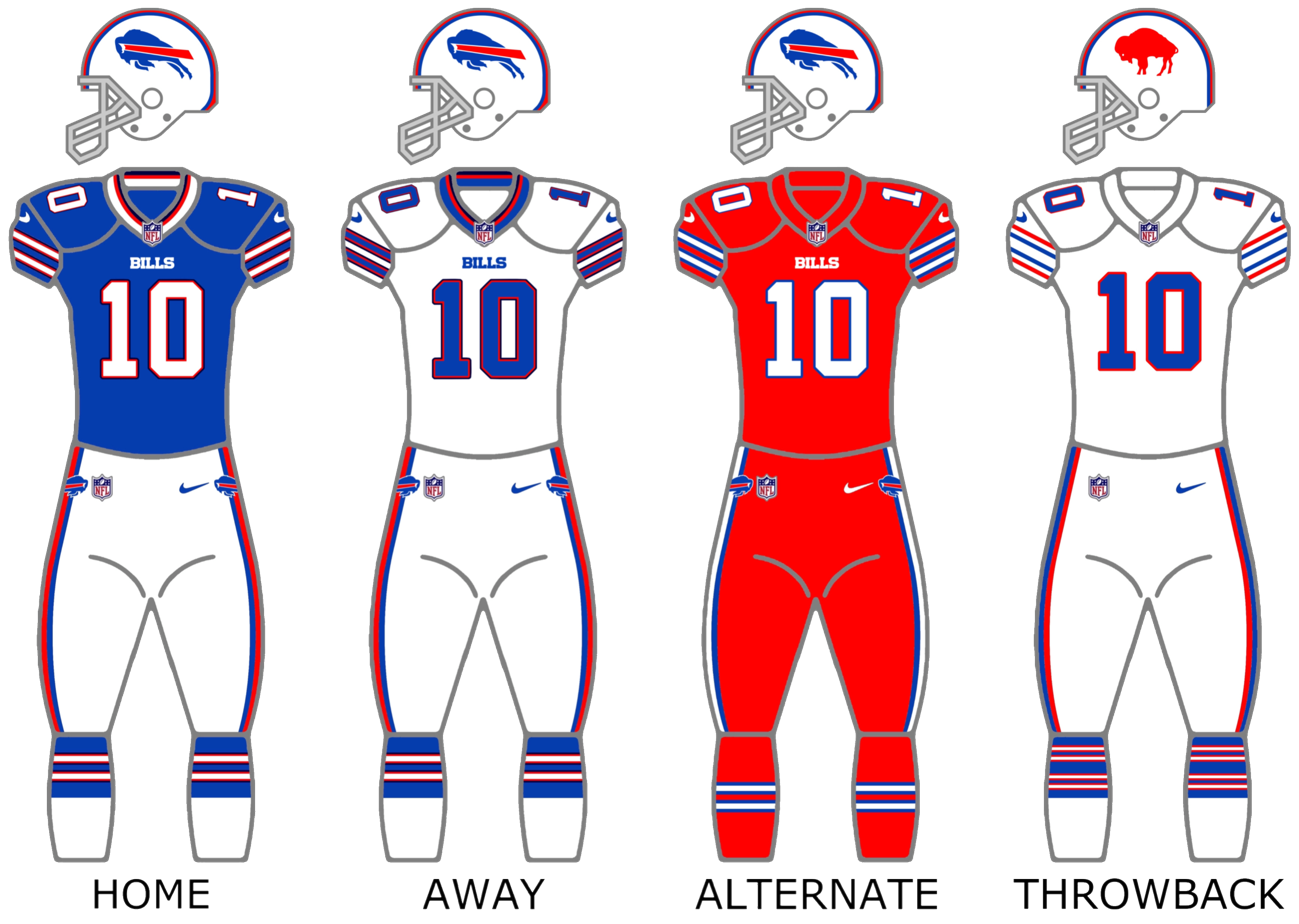

The 2018 season was the Buffalo Bills' 59th overall, 49th in the National Football League (NFL), fourth full under the ownership of Terry and Kim Pegula and second under the head coach/general manager tandem of Sean McDermott and Brandon Beane. The team previously finished with a 9–7 record in 2017 and returned to the playoffs for the first time after having not been to the playoffs since 1999.

After a 21–17 loss to the rival Miami Dolphins in Week 13, the Bills failed to match their 9–7 record from the previous season. They were officially eliminated from playoff contention the following week with a 27–23 loss to the New York Jets, ultimately finishing with a 6–10 record as numerous players from the previous season departed via trades, roster cuts or retirement. They went 4–3 in their last 7 games. This season was also notable for being the first season for quarterback Josh Allen and the last one for longtime defensive tackle Kyle Williams.

This was the only season the Bills missed the playoffs under McDermott, and as of the 2025 season, remains the most recent season in which the Bills missed the playoffs or finished with a losing record.

== Offseason ==
On May 1, 2018, three weeks after the 2017–18 Buffalo Sabres season ended, team president Russ Brandon announced his resignation from Pegula Sports and Entertainment. In a statement to the press, Brandon stated that the departure had been planned since he had reached 20 years with the Bills in November 2017 and that he fulfilled his duties to the Bills and Sabres for the remainder of the Sabres' season before tendering his resignation. A report in The Buffalo News claimed that Brandon had been subject to an internal investigation regarding inappropriate relationships with female employees; neither the Bills, Sabres nor Brandon mentioned such in their statements.

== Transactions ==
=== Front office changes ===
Position	Name	Reason	2018 replacement	Date	Notes
President	Russ Brandon	Resigned	Kim Pegula	May 1	

=== Free Agency ===
==== Arrivals ====
Position	Player	2017 Team	Date signed	Notes
CB	Vontae Davis	Indianapolis Colts	February 26, 2018	1-year/$5 million
RB	Chris Ivory	Jacksonville Jaguars	March 6, 2018	2-year/$5.5 million
DE	Owa Odighizuwa	New York Giants	March 8, 2018	Reserve/future
CB	Rafael Bush	New Orleans Saints	March 14, 2018	2-year/$4.5 million
DT	Star Lotulelei	Carolina Panthers	March 14, 2018	5-year/$50 million
LB	Julian Stanford	New York Jets	March 14, 2018	2-year/$3 million
LB/DE	Trent Murphy	Washington Redskins	March 14, 2018	3-year/$22.5 million
QB	A. J. McCarron	Cincinnati Bengals	March 14, 2018	2-year/$10 million
C	Russell Bodine	Cincinnati Bengals	March 19, 2018	2-year/5 million
OT	Marshall Newhouse	Oakland Raiders	March 19, 2018	1-year
WR	Jeremy Kerley	New York Jets	April 16, 2018	1-year
DT	Tenny Palepoi	Los Angeles Chargers	April 16, 2018	1-year
QB	Matt Barkley	Cincinnati Bengals	October 31, 2018	
P	Colton Schmidt	Buffalo Bills	October 31, 2018	

==== Departures ====
Position	Player	2018 team	Date signed	Notes
OT	Seantrel Henderson	Houston Texans	March 14, 2018	
LB	Preston Brown	Cincinnati Bengals	March 16, 2018	
WR	Deonte Thompson	Dallas Cowboys	March 22, 2018	
CB	E.J. Gaines	Cleveland Browns	March 23, 2018	
WR	Jordan Matthews	New England Patriots	April 6, 2018	

=== Draft ===
2018 Buffalo Bills draft
Round	Pick	Player	Position	College	Notes
1	7	Josh Allen *	Quarterback	Wyoming	From Tampa Bay
1	16	Tremaine Edmunds *	Linebacker	Virginia Tech	From Baltimore
3	96	Harrison Phillips	Defensive tackle	Stanford	From Philadelphia
4	121	Taron Johnson	Cornerback	Weber State	
5	154	Siran Neal	Safety	Jacksonville State	From Baltimore
5	166	Wyatt Teller *	Guard	Virginia Tech	From Jacksonville
6	187	Ray-Ray McCloud	Wide receiver	Clemson	From Cincinnati
7	255	Austin Proehl	Wide receiver	North Carolina	From Tampa Bay
Made roster * Made at least one Pro Bowl during career

Draft trades

- The Bills traded their first- and second-round selections (12th, 53rd and 56th overall) to the Tampa Bay Buccaneers in exchange for Tampa Bay's first- and seventh-round selections (7th and 255th overall).
- The Bills traded their first- and third-round selections (22nd and 65th overall) to the Baltimore Ravens in exchange for Baltimore's first- and fifth-round selections (16th and 154th overall)
- The Bills traded their first- and fifth-round selections (21st and 158th overall) and offensive tackle Cordy Glenn to the Cincinnati Bengals in exchange for Cincinnati's first- and sixth-round selections (12th and 187th overall).
- The Bills traded their first-round selection in 2017 (10th overall) to the Kansas City Chiefs in exchange for Kansas City's first-round selection (22nd overall) as well as their first- and third-round selections in 2017 (27th and 91st overall).
- The Bills traded their sixth-round selection (195th overall) and wide receiver Sammy Watkins to the Los Angeles Rams in exchange for the Rams' second-round selection (56th overall) and cornerback E.J. Gaines.
- The Bills traded quarterback Tyrod Taylor to the Cleveland Browns in exchange for Cleveland's third-round selection (65th).
- The Bills traded their third-round selection (85th overall), quarterback Cardale Jones and the seventh-round selection they acquired from the Los Angeles Chargers (234th overall) to the Carolina Panthers in exchange for wide receiver Kelvin Benjamin.
- The Bills traded cornerback Ronald Darby to the Philadelphia Eagles in exchange for Philadelphia's third-round selection (96th overall) and wide receiver Jordan Matthews.
- The Bills traded defensive tackle Marcell Dareus to the Jacksonville Jaguars in exchange for a conditional sixth-round selection, which became a fifth-round selection (166th overall) after Dareus remained on Jacksonville's roster for the remainder of the 2017 season and the Jaguars made the playoffs.
- The Bills traded their seventh-round selection (239th overall) to the Green Bay Packers in exchange for linebacker Lerentee McCray.

=== Trades ===
Player/picks acquired	From	Date traded	Players/picks traded	Source
2018 3rd-round pick (65th overall)	Cleveland Browns	March 14, 2018	QB Tyrod Taylor	
2018 1st-round pick (12th overall); 2018 6th-round pick (187th overall)	Cincinnati Bengals	March 14, 2018	T Cordy Glenn; 2018 1st-round pick (21st overall); 2018 5th-round pick (158th overall)	
WR Corey Coleman	Cleveland Browns	August 5, 2018	2020 7th-round pick	
2019 5th-round pick	Oakland Raiders	September 1, 2018	QB A. J. McCarron	

=== Undrafted free agents ===
Name	Position	College
Gerhard de Beer	Tackle	Arizona
Mat Boesen	Defensive end	TCU
Ike Boettger	Guard	Iowa
Ryan Carter	Cornerback	Clemson
Tyler Davis	Kicker	Penn State
Keith Ford	Running back	Texas A&M
Robert Foster	Wide receiver	Alabama
Mike Love	Defensive end	South Florida
Zach Olstad	Fullback	Winona State
Mo Porter	Offensive Linemen	Baylor
Corey Thompson	Linebacker	LSU
Levi Wallace	Cornerback	Alabama

== Staff ==
2018 Buffalo Bills staff
Front office: Owner/CEO – Terry Pegula; Owner/president – Kim Pegula; General manager – Brandon Beane; Assistant general manager – Joe Schoen; Director of player personnel – Dan Morgan; College scouting director – Terrance Gray; Senior VP of football administration – Jim Overdorf; Assistant director of college scouting – Lake Dawson; Director of pro personnel – Malik Boyd; Director of football administration – Kevin Meganck; Director of football operations – Brendan Rowe; Head coaches: Head coach – Sean McDermott; Assistant to the head coach – Matt Worswick; Offensive coaches: Offensive coordinator – Brian Daboll; Quarterbacks – David Culley; Running backs – Kelly Skipper; Wide receivers – Terry Robiskie; Tight ends – Rob Boras; Offensive line/run game coordinator – Juan Castillo; Assistant offensive line – Andrew Dees; Offensive assistant – Chad Hall; Offensive assistant – Shea Tierney; Offensive assistant – William Vlachos; Offensive quality control/defense special projects – Marc Lubick	Defensive coaches: Defensive coordinator – Leslie Frazier; Defensive line – Bill Teerlinck; Assistant defensive line – Aaron Whitecotton; Linebackers – Bob Babich; Defensive backs – John Butler; Safeties – Bobby Babich; Defensive assistant – Jim Salgado; Defensive quality control/assistant linebackers – John Egorugwu; Special teams coaches: Special teams coordinator – Danny Crossman; Assistant special teams – Matthew Smiley; Strength and conditioning: Head strength and conditioning – Eric Ciano; Assistant strength and conditioning – Hal Luther; Assistant strength and conditioning – Will Greenberg; Strength and conditioning assistant – Jason Oszvart; Strength and conditioning assistant – Mark Loecher

== Final roster ==
2018 Buffalo Bills roster
Quarterbacks (QB): 17 Josh Allen; 3 Derek Anderson; 5 Matt Barkley; Running backs (RB): 42 Patrick DiMarco FB; 35 Keith Ford; 33 Chris Ivory; 25 LeSean McCoy; Wide receivers (WR): 13 Victor Bolden; 16 Robert Foster; 11 Zay Jones; 14 Ray-Ray McCloud; 19 Isaiah McKenzie; 15 Da'Mari Scott; 10 Deonte Thompson; Tight ends (TE): 85 Charles Clay; 80 Jason Croom; 82 Logan Thomas	Offensive linemen (OL): 65 Ike Boettger G; 73 Dion Dawkins T; 62 Vladimir Ducasse G; 72 Ryan Groy C; 68 Conor McDermott T; 76 John Miller G; 79 Jordan Mills T; 74 Jeremiah Sirles G/T; 75 Wyatt Teller G; Defensive linemen (DL): 55 Jerry Hughes DE; 90 Shaq Lawson DE; 98 Star Lotulelei DT; 56 Mike Love DE; 93 Trent Murphy DE; 99 Harrison Phillips DT; 97 Jordan Phillips DT; 95 Kyle Williams DT; 54 Eddie Yarbrough DE	Linebackers (LB): 57 Lorenzo Alexander OLB; 49 Tremaine Edmunds MLB; 44 Deon Lacey OLB; 51 Julian Stanford OLB; 52 Corey Thompson OLB; Defensive backs (DB): 20 Rafael Bush CB/S; 23 Micah Hyde SS; 38 Ryan Lewis CB; 31 Dean Marlowe SS; 29 Siran Neal SS; 30 Lafayette Pitts CB; 21 Jordan Poyer FS; 37 Denzel Rice CB; 47 Levi Wallace CB; 27 Tre'Davious White CB; Special teams (ST): 8 Matt Darr P; 69 Reid Ferguson LS; 4 Stephen Hauschka K	Practice squad: 88 Kyle Carter TE; 36 Xavier Coleman CB; 48 Richard Jarvis LB; 77 Andrew Lauderdale T; 18 Tanner McEvoy WR; 91 Kyle Peko DT; 87 Cam Phillips WR; 96 Robert Thomas DT; 41 Josh Thornton CB; 89 Keith Towbridge TE; Reserve: 66 Russell Bodine C (IR); 9 Corey Bojorquez P (IR); 7 Cory Carter P (IR); 24 Taron Johnson CB (IR); 26 Taiwan Jones RB (IR); 58 Matt Milano OLB (IR); 45 Marcus Murphy RB (IR); Rookies in italics 53 active, 7 reserve, 10 practice squad

== Preseason ==
The Bills' preseason opponents and schedule was announced on April 11, 2018. For the first time since 2001, the Detroit Lions, who the Bills played in Week 15, were not included on the preseason schedule.

Week	Date	Opponent	Result	Record	Venue	Recap
1	August 9	Carolina Panthers	L 23–28	0–1	New Era Field	Recap
2	August 17	at Cleveland Browns	W 19–17	1–1	FirstEnergy Stadium	Recap
3	August 26	Cincinnati Bengals	L 13–26	1–2	New Era Field	Recap
4	August 30	at Chicago Bears	W 28–27	2–2	Soldier Field	Recap

== Regular season ==
=== Schedule ===
The Bills' 2018 schedule was announced on April 19, 2018.

Week	Date	Opponent	Result	Record	Venue	Recap
1	September 9	at Baltimore Ravens	**L** 3–47	0–1	M&T Bank Stadium	Recap
2	September 16	Los Angeles Chargers	**L** 20–31	0–2	New Era Field	Recap
3	September 23	at Minnesota Vikings	**W** 27–6	1–2	U.S. Bank Stadium	Recap
4	September 30	at Green Bay Packers	**L** 0–22	1–3	Lambeau Field	Recap
5	October 7	Tennessee Titans	**W** 13–12	2–3	New Era Field	Recap
6	October 14	at Houston Texans	**L** 13–20	2–4	NRG Stadium	Recap
7	October 21	at Indianapolis Colts	**L** 5–37	2–5	Lucas Oil Stadium	Recap
8	October 29	**New England Patriots**	**L** 6–25	2–6	New Era Field	Recap
9	November 4	Chicago Bears	**L** 9–41	2–7	New Era Field	Recap
10	November 11	at **New York Jets**	**W** 41–10	3–7	MetLife Stadium	Recap
11	Bye					
12	November 25	Jacksonville Jaguars	**W** 24–21	4–7	New Era Field	Recap
13	December 2	at **Miami Dolphins**	**L** 17–21	4–8	Hard Rock Stadium	Recap
14	December 9	**New York Jets**	**L** 23–27	4–9	New Era Field	Recap
15	December 16	Detroit Lions	**W** 14–13	5–9	New Era Field	Recap
16	December 23	at **New England Patriots**	**L** 12–24	5–10	Gillette Stadium	Recap
17	December 30	**Miami Dolphins**	**W** 42–17	6–10	New Era Field	Recap

Note: Intra-division opponents are in bold text.

=== Game summaries ===
==== Week 1: at Baltimore Ravens ====
Week One: Buffalo Bills at Baltimore Ravens – Game summary

Quarter	1	2	3	4	Total
Bills	0	0	3	0	**3**
**Ravens**	14	12	14	7	**47**

at M&T Bank Stadium, Baltimore, Maryland

- Date: September 9
- Game time: 1:00 p.m. EDT
- Game weather: 61 °F (16 °C), rain
- Game attendance: 70,591
- Referee: Shawn Hochuli
- TV announcers (CBS): Kevin Harlan, Rich Gannon, and Steve Tasker
- Recap, Gamebook

Game information

**First quarter**

- BAL – Alex Collins 8-yard run (Justin Tucker kick), 8:42. Ravens 7–0. **Drive: 10 plays, 80 yards, 6:18.**
- BAL – John Brown 7-yard pass from Joe Flacco (Justin Tucker kick), 1:32. Ravens 14–0. **Drive: 10 plays, 66 yards, 3:59.**

**Second quarter**

- BAL – Justin Tucker 41-yard field goal, 13:14. Ravens 17–0. **Drive: 4 plays, 13 yards, 0:49.**
- BAL – Justin Tucker 39-yard field goal, 4:16. Ravens 20–0. **Drive: 4 plays, 8 yards, 1:22.**
- BAL – Michael Crabtree 12-yard pass from Joe Flacco (pass failed), 0:13. Ravens 26–0. **Drive: 9 plays, 85 yards, 2:35.**

**Third quarter**

- BAL – Willie Snead 13-yard pass from Joe Flacco (Justin Tucker kick), 12:28. Ravens 33–0. **Drive: 3 plays, 14 yards, 1:20.**
- BAL – Javorius Allen 1-yard run (Justin Tucker kick), 11:22. Ravens 40–0. **Drive: 1 plays, 1 yards, 0:04.**
- BUF – Steven Hauschka 35-yard field goal, 2:38. Ravens 40–3. **Drive: 12 plays, 46 yards, 5:31.**

**Fourth quarter**

- BAL – Kenneth Dixon 2-yard run (Justin Tucker kick), 3:52. Ravens 47–3. **Drive: 13 plays, 89 yards, 8:03.**

**Top passers**

- BUF – Josh Allen – 6/15, 74 yards
- BAL – Joe Flacco – 25/34, 236 yards, 3 TD

**Top rushers**

- BUF – Marcus Murphy – 6 rushes, 31 yards
- BAL – Kenneth Dixon – 13 rushes, 44 yards, TD

**Top receivers**

- BUF – Zay Jones – 3 receptions, 26 yards
- BAL – Willie Snead – 4 receptions, 49 yards, TD

Played in heavy rain, the lopsided game saw a dominant performance from Ravens QB Joe Flacco, who completed 25 of 34 passes for 236 yards and three touchdowns against the Bills defense before handing the reigns off to rookie Lamar Jackson. Buffalo was unable to keep pace on offense, finishing without a first down until the third quarter. Bills QB Nathan Peterman completed just 5/18 attempts for 24 yards and two interceptions, good for a 0.0 passer rating before being benched for rookie Josh Allen in the third quarter. With a final score of 47–3 in favor of Baltimore, Buffalo suffered its worst season-opening loss ever and opened the 2018 season 0–1.

==== Week 2: vs. Los Angeles Chargers ====
Week Two: Los Angeles Chargers at Buffalo Bills – Game summary

Quarter	1	2	3	4	Total
**Chargers**	14	14	0	3	**31**
Bills	0	6	7	7	**20**

at New Era Field, Orchard Park, New York

- Date: September 16
- Game time: 1:00 p.m. EDT
- Game weather: 83 °F (28 °C), sunny
- Game attendance: 69,187
- Referee: Clay Martin
- TV announcers (CBS): Tom McCarthy and Steve Beuerlein
- Recap, Gamebook

Game information

**First quarter**

- LAC – Mike Williams 10-yard pass from Philip Rivers (Caleb Sturgis kick), 9:26. Chargers 7–0. **Drive: 3 plays, 38 yards, 1:27.**
- LAC – Melvin Gordon 20-yard run (Caleb Sturgis kick), 4:18. Chargers 14–0. **Drive: 6 plays, 61 yards, 3:24.**

**Second quarter**

- BUF – Stephen Hauschka 43-yard field goal, 13:38. Chargers 14–3. **Drive: 12 plays, 51 yards, 5:40.**
- LAC – Melvin Gordon 9-yard pass from Philip Rivers (Caleb Sturgis kick), 10:43. Chargers 21–3. **Drive: 5 plays, 75 yards, 2:55.**
- LAC – Melvin Gordon 2-yard pass from Philip Rivers (Caleb Sturgis kick), 1:55. Chargers 28–3. **Drive: 12 plays, 81 yards, 6:46.**
- BUF – Stephen Hauschka 40-yard field goal, 0:47. Chargers 28–6. **Drive: 6 plays, 52 yards, 1:08.**

**Third quarter**

- BUF – Chris Ivory 1-yard run (Stephen Hauschka kick), 11:06. Chargers 28–13. **Drive: 7 plays, 75 yards, 3:54.**

**Fourth quarter**

- LAC – Caleb Sturgis 24-yard field goal, 3:50. Chargers 31–13. **Drive: 7 plays, 11 yards, 3:10.**
- BUF – Kelvin Benjamin 3-yard pass from Josh Allen (Stephen Hauschka kick), 0:38. Chargers 31–20. **Drive: 12 plays, 75 yards, 3:12.**

**Top passers**

- LAC – Philip Rivers – 23/27, 256 yards, 3 TD
- BUF – Josh Allen – 18/33, 245 yards, TD, 2 INT

**Top rushers**

- LAC – Austin Ekeler – 11 rushes, 77 yards
- BUF – LeSean McCoy – 9 rushes, 39 yards

**Top receivers**

- LAC – Keenan Allen – 6 receptions, 67 yards
- BUF – Zay Jones – 2 receptions, 63 yards

QB Josh Allen made his first career start in place of Nathan Peterman. This was also CB Vontae Davis' last game in the NFL as he abruptly retired during halftime after 10 seasons. Veteran LB Lorenzo Alexander called Davis' decision "disrespectful" and that he had "never seen it, ever." Star RB LeSean McCoy left the game after suffering a strained rib muscle early in the second half.

==== Week 3: at Minnesota Vikings ====
Week Three: Buffalo Bills at Minnesota Vikings – Game summary

Quarter	1	2	3	4	Total
**Bills**	17	10	0	0	**27**
Vikings	0	0	0	6	**6**

at U.S. Bank Stadium, Minneapolis, Minnesota

- Date: September 23
- Game time: 1:00 p.m. EDT/12:00 p.m. CDT
- Game weather: Played indoors (dome stadium)
- Game attendance: 66,800
- Referee: Alex Kemp
- TV announcers (CBS): Jim Nantz, Tony Romo, Tracy Wolfson, and Gene Steratore
- Recap, Gamebook

Game information

**First quarter**

- BUF – Josh Allen 10-yard run (Stephen Hauschka kick), 10:01. Bills 7–0. **Drive: 9 plays, 75 yards, 4:59.**
- BUF – Stephen Hauschka 30-yard field goal, 7:24. Bills 10–0. **Drive: 4 plays, 4 yards, 1:57.**
- BUF – Jason Croom 26-yard pass from Josh Allen (Stephen Hauschka kick), 5:09. Bills 17–0. **Drive: 2 plays, 25 yards, 0:48.**

**Second quarter**

- BUF – Josh Allen 1-yard run (Stephen Hauschka kick), 12:14. Bills 24–0. **Drive: 11 plays, 65 yards, 5:45.**
- BUF – Stephen Hauschka 50-yard field goal, 6:16. Bills 27–0. **Drive: 8 plays, 17 yards, 3:46.**

**Third quarter**

- No scoring plays.

**Fourth quarter**

- MIN – Kyle Rudolph 4-yard pass from Kirk Cousins (pass failed), 2:59. Bills 27–6. **Drive: 13 plays, 92 yards, 4:20.**

**Top passers**

- BUF – Josh Allen – 15/22, 196 yards, TD
- MIN – Kirk Cousins – 40/55, 296 yards, TD, INT

**Top rushers**

- BUF – Chris Ivory – 20 rushes, 56 yards
- MIN – Mike Boone – 2 rushes, 11 yards

**Top receivers**

- BUF – Chris Ivory – 3 receptions, 70 yards
- MIN – Adam Thielen – 14 receptions, 105 yards

In Josh Allen's second NFL start, he went 15/22 for 196 yards and a TD, earning him a 111.2 passer rating. He also added 39 rushing yards and two rushing touchdowns. The defense also sacked Vikings QB Kirk Cousins four times and intercepted him once. The Bills won this game despite being 16.5-point betting underdogs.

==== Week 4: at Green Bay Packers ====
Week Four: Buffalo Bills at Green Bay Packers – Game summary

Quarter	1	2	3	4	Total
Bills	0	0	0	0	**0**
**Packers**	6	10	3	3	**22**

at Lambeau Field, Green Bay, Wisconsin

- Date: September 30
- Game time: 1:00 p.m. EDT/12:00 p.m. CDT
- Game weather: 49 °F (9 °C), cloudy
- Game attendance: 78,312
- Referee: Bill Vinovich
- TV announcers (CBS): Ian Eagle, Dan Fouts, and Evan Washburn
- Recap, Gamebook

Game information

First quarter

- GB – Jimmy Graham 3-yard pass from Aaron Rodgers, 5:19. Packers 6–0. **Drive: 6 plays, 56 yards, 2:39.**

Second quarter

- GB – Aaron Jones 3-yard run (Mason Crosby kick), 11:09. Packers 13–0. **Drive: 9 plays, 83 yards, 5:22.**
- GB – Mason Crosby 52-yard field goal, 0:03. Packers 16–0. **Drive: 7 plays, 40 yards, 0:43.**

Third quarter

- GB – Mason Crosby 36-yard field goal, 11:17. Packers 19–0. **Drive: 10 plays, 57 yards, 3:47.**

Fourth quarter

- GB – Mason Crosby 52-yard field goal, 2:00. Packers 22–0. **Drive: 7 plays, 39 yards, 2:26.**

Top passers

- BUF – Josh Allen – 16/33, 151 yards, 2 INT
- GB – Aaron Rodgers – 22/40, 298 yards, TD, INT

Top rushers

- BUF – LeSean McCoy – 5 rushes, 24 yards
- GB – Aaron Jones – 11 rushes, 65 yards, TD

Top receivers

- BUF – Charles Clay – 4 receptions, 40 yards
- GB – Davante Adams – 8 receptions, 81 yards

Despite holding the Aaron Rodgers-led Packers offense to just 22 points and forcing two turnovers, which included a Jordan Poyer interception, the Bills were unable to garner any points. With the team's first shutout loss since 2008, Buffalo fell to 1–3.

==== Week 5: vs. Tennessee Titans ====
Week Five: Tennessee Titans at Buffalo Bills – Game summary

Quarter	1	2	3	4	Total
Titans	3	3	0	6	**12**
**Bills**	7	0	3	3	**13**

at New Era Field, Orchard Park, New York

- Date: October 7
- Game time: 1:00 p.m. EDT
- Game weather: 62 °F (17 °C), cloudy
- Game attendance: 68,202
- Referee: Tony Corrente
- TV announcers (CBS): Spero Dedes and Adam Archuleta
- Recap, Gamebook

Game information

**First quarter**

- BUF – Josh Allen 14-yard run (Stephen Hauschka kick), 9:03. Bills 7–0. **Drive: 11 plays, 47 yards, 5:26.**
- TEN – Ryan Succop 25-yard field goal, 1:35. Bills 7–3. **Drive: 7 plays, 18 yards, 3:27.**

**Second quarter**

- TEN – Ryan Succop 54-yard field goal, 0:00. Bills 7–6. **Drive: 11 plays, 52 yards, 5:03.**

**Third quarter**

- BUF – Stephen Hauschka 40-yard field goal, 1:59. Bills 10–6. **Drive: 7 plays, 27 yards, 3:47.**

**Fourth quarter**

- TEN – Ryan Succop 39-yard field goal, 10:30. Bills 10–9. **Drive: 14 plays, 54 yards, 6:29.**
- TEN – Ryan Succop 50-yard field goal, 4:43. Titans 12–10. **Drive: 7 plays, 22 yards, 3:08.**
- BUF – Stephen Hauschka 46-yard field goal, 0:00. Bills 13–12. **Drive: 11 plays, 47 yards, 4:43.**

**Top passers**

- TEN – Marcus Mariota – 14/26, 129 yards, INT
- BUF – Josh Allen – 10/19, 82 yards, INT

**Top rushers**

- TEN – Derrick Henry – 11 rushes, 56 yards
- BUF – LeSean McCoy – 24 rushes, 85 yards

**Top receivers**

- TEN – Corey Davis – 4 receptions, 49 yards
- BUF – Zay Jones – 3 receptions, 20 yards

With RB LeSean McCoy back to full health, the Bills maintained a run-heavy offensive game plan. QB Josh Allen scored his third rushing touchdown of the season and the Bills held the Titans offense, led by QB Marcus Mariota, in check in a defensive battle, aided by a Taron Johnson interception in the second quarter. The Bills maintained the lead throughout the game until the fourth quarter, but sealed the win with a 46-yard Steven Hauschka FG as time expired, improving the Bills to 2–3 on the season.

==== Week 6: at Houston Texans ====
Week Six: Buffalo Bills at Houston Texans – Game summary

Quarter	1	2	3	4	Total
Bills	0	0	6	7	**13**
**Texans**	7	3	0	10	**20**

at NRG Stadium, Houston, Texas

- Date: October 14
- Game time: 1:00 p.m. EDT/12:00 p.m. CDT
- Game weather: Played indoors (retractable roof closed)
- Game attendance: 71,638
- Referee: Craig Wrolstad
- TV announcers (CBS): Andrew Catalon and James Lofton
- Recap, Gamebook

Game information

**First quarter**

- HOU – DeAndre Hopkins 13-yard pass from Deshaun Watson, 4:43. Texans 7–0. **Drive: 5 plays, 29 yards, 2:52.**

**Second quarter**

- HOU – Kaʻimi Fairbairn 33-yard field goal, 8:33. Texans 10–0. **Drive: 4 plays, 7 yards, 1:40.**

**Third quarter**

- BUF – Stephen Hauschka 23-yard field goal, 10:12. Texans 10–3. **Drive: 9 plays, 26 yards, 4:11.**
- BUF – Stephen Hauschka 52-yard field goal, 2:12. Texans 10–6. **Drive: 5 plays, 45 yards, 2:46.**

**Fourth quarter**

- BUF – Zay Jones 16-yard pass from Nathan Peterman (Stephen Hauschka kick), 13:00. Bills 13–10. **Drive: 5 plays, 32 yards, 2:46.**
- HOU – Kaʻimi Fairbairn 27-yard field goal, 1:34. Tied 13–13. **Drive: 9 plays, 84 yards, 2:21.**
- HOU – Johnathan Joseph 28-yard interception return (Kaʻimi Fairbairn kick), 1:23. Texans 20–13.

**Top passers**

- BUF – Josh Allen – 10/17, 84 yards
- HOU – Deshaun Watson – 15/25, 177 yards, TD, 2 INT

**Top rushers**

- BUF – LeSean McCoy – 16 rushes, 73 yards
- HOU – Lamar Miller – 15 rushes, 46 yards

**Top receivers**

- BUF – Kelvin Benjamin – 2 receptions, 43 yards
- HOU – DeAndre Hopkins – 5 receptions, 63 yards, TD

The Bills defense only allowed 216 yards from the Texans offense, sacking QB Deshaun Watson seven times and forcing three turnovers, but an inept performance by special teams gave the Texans good field position in the first half as Houston jumped to a 10–0 halftime lead. After leading the Bills to a field goal and moving the offense back into Texans territory a few drives later, Josh Allen was injured by a late hit from Texans LB Whitney Mercilus and was replaced by Nathan Peterman, who put the Bills in the lead with a touchdown pass to WR Zay Jones. However, after Houston tied the game at 13–13 late in the fourth quarter, Peterman threw two interceptions, including a pick-six to Texans CB Johnathan Joseph, which sealed the loss for Buffalo, dropping the team to 2–4.

==== Week 7: at Indianapolis Colts ====
Week Seven: Buffalo Bills at Indianapolis Colts – Game summary

Quarter	1	2	3	4	Total
Bills	0	0	5	0	**5**
**Colts**	0	24	0	13	**37**

at Lucas Oil Stadium, Indianapolis, Indiana

- Date: October 21
- Game time: 1:00 p.m. EDT
- Game weather: Played indoors (retractable roof closed)
- Game attendance: 56,848
- Referee: Brad Allen
- TV announcers (CBS): Spero Dedes and Adam Archuleta
- Recap, Gamebook

Game information

**First quarter**

- No scoring plays.

**Second quarter**

- IND – Erik Swoope 17-yard pass from Andrew Luck (kick failed), 13:38. Colts 6–0. **Drive: 13 plays, 75 yards, 6:53.**
- IND – Marlon Mack 29-yard pass from Andrew Luck (Marlon Mack run), 9:35. Colts 14–0. **Drive: 3 plays, 74 yards, 1:29.**
- IND – T. Y. Hilton 5-yard pass from Andrew Luck (Adam Vinatieri kick), 1:48. Colts 21–0. **Drive: 9 plays, 82 yards, 5:35.**
- IND – Adam Vinatieri 36-yard field goal, 0:03. Colts 24–0. **Drive: 3 plays, 14 yards, 0:13.**

**Third quarter**

- BUF – Steven Hauschka 34-yard field goal, 7:46. Colts 24–3. **Drive: 12 plays, 56 yards, 7:18.**
- BUF – Andrew Luck fumble, ball goes out of bounds in IND end zone for a safety, 0:25. Colts 24–5.

**Fourth quarter**

- IND – T. Y. Hilton 1-yard pass from Andrew Luck (Adam Vinatieri kick), 13:18. Colts 31–5. **Drive: 3 plays, 2 yards, 1:31.**
- IND – Marlon Mack 20-yard run (kick failed), 5:32. Colts 37–5. **Drive: 1 play, 20 yards, 0:06.**

**Top passers**

- BUF – Derek Anderson – 20/31, 175 yards, 3 INT
- IND – Andrew Luck – 17/23, 156 yards, 4 TD

**Top rushers**

- BUF – Chris Ivory – 16 rushes, 81 yards
- IND – Marlon Mack – 19 rushes, 126 yards, TD

**Top receivers**

- BUF – Kelvin Benjamin – 4 receptions, 71 yards
- IND – Chester Rogers – 4 receptions, 40 yards

After Allen's injury in the previous game against the Texans and Peterman's poor performance in his relief, recently signed third-stringer Derek Anderson was named the starter on October 17, 2018. Sadly, not even Anderson could help the Bills, who suffered their worst loss since Week 1, as they were on the wrong end of a final score of 37–5, dropping to 2–5. This was the first NFL game to ever end in the score of 37–5.

==== Week 8: vs. New England Patriots ====
Week Eight: New England Patriots at Buffalo Bills – Game summary

Quarter	1	2	3	4	Total
**Patriots**	3	6	3	13	**25**
Bills	0	3	3	0	**6**

at New Era Field, Orchard Park, New York

- Date: October 29
- Game time: 8:15 p.m. EDT
- Game weather: 46 °F (8 °C), partly cloudy
- Game attendance: 70,109
- Referee: Jerome Boger
- TV announcers (ESPN/WKBW): Joe Tessitore, Jason Witten, Booger McFarland, and Lisa Salters
- Recap, Gamebook

Game information

**First quarter**

- NE – Stephen Gostkowski 25-yard field goal, 4:46. Patriots 3–0. **Drive: 15 plays, 73 yards, 5:15.**

**Second quarter**

- NE – Stephen Gostkowski 40-yard field goal, 11:47. Patriots 6–0. **Drive: 11 plays, 63 yards, 4:53.**
- NE – Stephen Gostkowski 38-yard field goal, 5:42. Patriots 9–0. **Drive: 8 plays, 37 yards, 4:27.**
- BUF – Stephen Hauschka 47-yard field goal, 1:39. Patriots 9–3. **Drive: 10 plays, 46 yards, 4:03.**

**Third quarter**

- BUF – Stephen Hauschka 51-yard field goal, 7:39. Patriots 9–6. **Drive: 4 plays, 2 yards, 1:37.**
- NE – Stephen Gostkowski 25-yard field goal, 2:03. Patriots 12–6. **Drive: 5 plays, 22 yards, 0:52.**

**Fourth quarter**

- NE – James White 1-yard run (pass failed), 9:58. Patriots 18–6. **Drive: 10 plays, 94 yards, 4:50.**
- NE – Devin McCourty 84-yard interception return (Stephen Gostkowski kick), 5:54. Patriots 25–6.

**Top passers**

- NE – Tom Brady – 29/45, 324 yards
- BUF – Derek Anderson – 22/39, 290 yards, INT

**Top rushers**

- NE – Cordarrelle Patterson – 10 rushes, 38 yards
- BUF – Chris Ivory – 6 rushes, 34 yards

**Top receivers**

- NE – Julian Edelman – 9 receptions, 104 yards
- BUF – LeSean McCoy – 5 receptions, 73 yards

In the first Monday Night Football game hosted by Buffalo since losing to the Cleveland Browns, the Bills defense held up again, holding QB Tom Brady out of the end zone and limiting the Patriots to three Stephen Gostkowski field goals in the first half, but a late rushing touchdown by Patriots RB James White and a subsequent pick-six by CB Devin McCourty sealed yet another Patriots win over the Bills, with McCourty's interception occurring immediately after an overturned touchdown pass from Derek Anderson to Bills TE Jason Croom. The Bills retired RB Thurman Thomas' No. 34 jersey during halftime, with longtime ESPN host Chris Berman delivering the introductory speech.

==== Week 9: vs. Chicago Bears ====
Week Nine: Chicago Bears at Buffalo Bills – Game summary

Quarter	1	2	3	4	Total
**Bears**	0	28	3	10	**41**
Bills	0	0	3	6	**9**

at New Era Field, Orchard Park, New York

- Date: November 4
- Game time: 1:00 p.m. EST
- Game weather: 49 °F (9 °C), mostly sunny
- Game attendance: 68,749
- Referee: Shawn Smith
- TV announcers (Fox): Chris Myers, Daryl Johnston, and Laura Okmin
- Recap, Gamebook

Game information

**First quarter**

- No scoring plays.

**Second quarter**

- CHI – Jordan Howard 1-yard run (Cody Parkey kick), 13:04. Bears 7–0. **Drive: 6 plays, 37 yards, 2:52.**
- CHI – Eddie Jackson 65-yard fumble return (Cody Parkey kick), 7:07. Bears 14–0.
- CHI – Leonard Floyd 19-yard interception return (Cody Parkey kick), 3:32. Bears 21–0.
- CHI – Jordan Howard 18-yard run (Cody Parkey kick), 0:44. Bears 28–0. **Drive: 2 plays, 23 yards, 0:39.**

**Third quarter**

- BUF – Stephen Hauschka 41-yard field goal, 11:01. Bears 28–3. **Drive: 12 plays, 52 yards, 3:59.**
- CHI – Cody Parkey 23-yard field goal, 8:13. Bears 31–3. **Drive: 5 plays, 70 yards, 2:48.**

**Fourth quarter**

- CHI – Cody Parkey 45-yard field goal, 13:33. Bears 34–3. **Drive: 5 plays, 70 yards, 2:48.**
- BUF – Nathan Peterman 1-yard run (pass failed), 5:41. Bears 34–9. **Drive: 15 plays, 75 yards, 7:52.**
- CHI – Trey Burton 2-yard pass from Mitchell Trubisky (Cody Parkey kick), 4:36. Bears 41–9. **Drive: 4 plays, 50 yards, 1:05.**

**Top passers**

- CHI – Mitchell Trubisky – 12/20, 135 yards, TD, INT
- BUF – Nathan Peterman – 31/49, 189 yards, 3 INT

**Top rushers**

- CHI – Jordan Howard – 14 rushes, 47 yards, 2 TD
- BUF – Nathan Peterman – 8 rushes, 46 yards, TD

**Top receivers**

- CHI – Anthony Miller – 5 receptions, 49 yards
- BUF – Logan Thomas – 7 receptions, 40 yards

After Derek Anderson suffered a concussion in the previous game, Nathan Peterman made the start with the team with Josh Allen still out. The Bills continued their losing skid to four games with the 41–9 loss and fell to 2–7, matching their loss total from all of 2017.

==== Week 10: at New York Jets ====
Week Ten: Buffalo Bills at New York Jets – Game summary

Quarter	1	2	3	4	Total
**Bills**	14	17	7	3	**41**
Jets	0	3	7	0	**10**

at MetLife Stadium, East Rutherford, New Jersey

- Date: November 11
- Game time: 1:00 p.m. EST
- Game weather: 46 °F (8 °C), sunny
- Game attendance: 77,982
- Referee: Ronald Torbert
- TV announcers (CBS): Andrew Catalon, James Lofton, and Jay Feely
- Recap, Gamebook

Game information

**First quarter**

- BUF – LeSean McCoy 28-yard run (Steven Hauschka kick), 14:20. Bills 7–0. **Drive: 2 plays, 75 yards, 0:40.**
- BUF - Jason Croom fumble recovery in NYJ end zone (Steven Hauschka kick), 2:25, Bills 14–0. **Drive: 14 plays, 73 yards, 7:17.**

**Second quarter**

- BUF – Steven Hauschka 54-yard field goal, 13:57. Bills 17–0. **Drive: 5 plays, 37 yards, 2:25.**
- BUF – Dion Dawkins 7-yard pass from Matt Barkley (Steven Hauschka kick), 8:02. Bills 24–0. **Drive: 9 plays, 64 yards, 4:54.**
- BUF – LeSean McCoy 1-yard run (Steven Hauschka kick), 0:45. Bills 31–0. **Drive: 7 plays, 54 yards, 3:13.**
- NYJ – Jason Myers 55-yard field goal, 0:02. Bills 31–3. **Drive: 6 plays, 26 yards, 0:42.**

**Third quarter**

- NYJ – Isaiah Crowell 5-yard run (Jason Myers kick), 6:37. Bills 31–10. **Drive: 7 plays, 73 yards, 3:38.**
- BUF – Zay Jones 8-yard pass from Matt Barkley (Steven Hauschka kick), 0:39. Bills 38–10. **Drive: 12 plays, 65 yards, 5:59.**

**Fourth quarter**

- BUF – Steven Hauschka 31-yard field goal, 2:47. Bills 41–10. **Drive: 9 plays, 35 yards, 5:21.**

**Top passers**

- BUF – Matt Barkley – 15/25, 232 yards, 2 TD
- NYJ – Josh McCown – 17/34, 135 yards, 2 INT

**Top rushers**

- BUF – LeSean McCoy – 26 rushes, 113 yards, 2 TD
- NYJ – Trenton Cannon – 4 rushes, 30 yards

**Top receivers**

- BUF – Robert Foster – 3 receptions, 105 yards
- NYJ – Chris Herndon – 3 receptions, 34 yards

Recently signed quarterback Matt Barkley was named the starter against the New York Jets. The Bills snapped their four-game losing streak, dominating the Jets 41–10. Barkley's efficient performance in the win, coupled with the improving health of Josh Allen, led to the release of Nathan Peterman the following evening.

==== Week 12: vs. Jacksonville Jaguars ====
Week Twelve: Jacksonville Jaguars at Buffalo Bills – Game summary

Quarter	1	2	3	4	Total
Jaguars	0	14	0	7	**21**
**Bills**	14	0	0	10	**24**

at New Era Field, Orchard Park, New York

- Date: November 25
- Game time: 1:00 p.m. EST
- Game weather: 44 °F (7 °C), cloudy
- Game attendance: 57,799
- Referee: Walt Coleman
- TV announcers (CBS): Spero Dedes and Adam Archuleta
- Recap, Gamebook

Game information

**First quarter**

- BUF – Isaiah McKenzie 6-yard run (Steven Hauschka kick), 5:02. Bills 7–0. **Drive: 5 plays, 75 yards, 2:23.**
- BUF – Robert Foster 75-yard pass from Josh Allen (Steven Hauschka kick), 2:39. Bills 14–0. **Drive: 3 plays, 86 yards, 1:19.**

**Second quarter**

- JAX – Leonard Fournette 5-yard run (Josh Lambo kick), 10:58. Bills 14–7. **Drive: 11 plays, 74 yards, 6:41.**
- JAX – Leonard Fournette 1-yard run (Josh Lambo kick), 5:30. Tied 14–14. **Drive: 6 plays, 74 yards, 3:18.**

**Third quarter**

- No scoring plays

**Fourth quarter**

- BUF – Josh Allen 14-yard run (Steven Hauschka kick), 14:52. Bills 21–14. **Drive: 3 plays, 68 yards, 0:43.**
- BUF – Steven Hauschka 22-yard field goal, 3:06. Bills 24–14. **Drive: 6 plays, 14 yards, 1:55.**
- JAX – Dede Westbrook 13-yard pass from Blake Bortles (Josh Lambo kick), 1:20. Bills 24–21. **Drive: 8 plays, 70 yards, 1:46.**

**Top passers**

- JAX – Blake Bortles – 12/23, 127 yards, TD, 2 INT
- BUF – Josh Allen – 8/19, 160 yards, TD

**Top rushers**

- JAX – Leonard Fournette – 18 rushes, 95 yards, 2 TD
- BUF – Josh Allen – 13 rushes, 99 yards, TD

**Top receivers**

- JAX – Dede Westbrook – 3 receptions, 44 yards, TD
- BUF – Robert Foster – 2 receptions, 94 yards, TD

In a rematch of the 2017 wild-card game with the Jacksonville Jaguars, the Bills attained an early 14–0 lead, thanks to a rushing touchdown by newly signed WR/KR Isaiah McKenzie and a 75-yard touchdown strike from Josh Allen to WR Robert Foster. However, Jacksonville fought back with two rushing touchdowns from RB Leonard Fournette in the second quarter. Jacksonville was in position to claim the lead in the third quarter following a 30-yard reception by WR Donte Moncrief that put the Jaguars at the Bills 1-yard line, but a brawl that led to Fournette and Bills DE Shaq Lawson getting ejected plus two penalties on the Jaguars and defensive stops by the Bills forced the Jaguars to settle for a field goal attempt by Josh Lambo, who promptly missed. The Bills then reclaimed the lead the following drive with a 14-yard touchdown run by Allen, then iced the game with a Jordan Poyer interception of QB Blake Bortles and subsequent Stephen Hauschka field goal, which was too much for Jacksonville to overcome despite scoring a touchdown afterwards. With the win, the Bills improved to 4–7.

==== Week 13: at Miami Dolphins ====
Week Thirteen: Buffalo Bills at Miami Dolphins – Game summary

Quarter	1	2	3	4	Total
Bills	0	6	3	8	**17**
**Dolphins**	7	7	0	7	**21**

at Hard Rock Stadium, Miami Gardens, Florida

- Date: December 2
- Game time: 1:00 p.m. EST
- Game weather: 86 °F (30 °C), partly cloudy
- Game attendance: 65,155
- Referee: Shawn Hochuli
- TV announcers (CBS): Andrew Catalon and James Lofton
- Recap, Gamebook

Game information

**First quarter**

- MIA – DeVante Parker 18-yard pass from Ryan Tannehill (Jason Sanders kick), 9:42. Dolphins 7–0. **Drive: 10 plays, 75 yards, 5:18.**

**Second quarter**

- BUF – Zay Jones 15-yard pass from Josh Allen (kick failed), 11:44. Dolphins 7–6. **Drive: 9 plays, 55 yards, 5:05.**
- MIA – Kenyan Drake 3-yard pass from Ryan Tannehill (Jason Sanders kick), 0:40. Dolphins 14–6. **Drive: 6 plays, 36 yards, 3:01.**

**Third quarter**

- BUF – Stephen Hauschka 32-yard field goal, 9:02. Dolphins 14–9. **Drive: 10 plays, 79 yards, 5:58.**

**Fourth quarter**

- BUF – Zay Jones 25-yard pass from Josh Allen (Josh Allen-Zay Jones pass), 12:00. Bills 17–14. **Drive: 6 plays, 83 yards, 3:24.**
- MIA – Kenny Stills 13-yard pass from Ryan Tannehill (Jason Sanders kick), 8:42. Dolphins 21–17. **Drive: 6 plays, 75 yards, 3:18.**

**Top passers**

- BUF – Josh Allen – 18/33, 231 yards, 2 TD, 2 INT
- MIA – Ryan Tannehill – 16/24, 137 yards, 3 TD, INT

**Top rushers**

- BUF – Josh Allen – 9 rushes, 135 yards
- MIA – Kenyan Drake – 7 rushes, 31 yards

**Top receivers**

- BUF – Zay Jones – 4 receptions, 67 yards, 2 TD
- MIA – DeVante Parker – 4 receptions, 43 yards, TD

Buffalo outgained Miami in terms of total offense, with 415 yards compared to just 175, but their struggles on special teams and penalties gave the Dolphins short fields and allowed QB Ryan Tannehill to pass for three touchdowns, including the eventual 13-yard game winner to WR Kenny Stills. The game came down to the final moments, when Josh Allen, who compiled 366 total yards on the day, attempted a fourth down pass to TE Charles Clay, who dropped it just outside the end zone. The failed conversion sealed the loss for the Bills as the team fell to 4–8. This would be Buffalo's last loss to Miami until Week 3 of the 2022 season

==== Week 14: vs. New York Jets ====
Week Fourteen: New York Jets at Buffalo Bills – Game summary

Quarter	1	2	3	4	Total
**Jets**	3	10	0	14	**27**
Bills	14	3	3	3	**23**

at New Era Field, Orchard Park, New York

- Date: December 9
- Game time: 1:00 p.m. EST
- Game weather: 31 °F (−1 °C), fair
- Game attendance: 59,119
- Referee: Alex Kemp
- TV announcers (CBS): Spero Dedes, Adam Archuleta, and Otis Livingston
- Recap, Gamebook

Game information

**First quarter**

- BUF – Josh Allen 6-yard rush (Steven Hauschka kick), 9:12. Bills 7–0. **Drive: 11 plays, 73 yards, 5:48.**
- NYJ – Jason Myers 47-yard field goal, 4:34. Bills 7–3. **Drive: 4 plays, 3 yards, 1:20.**
- BUF – Isaiah McKenzie 15-yard rush (Steven Hauschka kick), 1:07. Bills 14–3. **Drive: 7 plays, 75 yards, 3:27.**

**Second quarter**

- NYJ – Jason Myers 21-yard field goal, 11:10. Bills 14–6. **Drive: 10 plays, 43 yards, 4:57.**
- BUF – Steven Hauschka 31-yard field goal, 7:14. Bills 17–6. **Drive: 8 plays, 58 yards, 3:56.**
- NYJ – Trenton Cannon 4-yard rush (Jason Myers kick), 6:31. Bills 17–13. **Drive: 1 plays, 8 yards, 0:43.**

**Third quarter**

- BUF – Steven Hauschka 29-yard field goal, 13:22. Bills 20–13. **Drive: 4 plays, 2 yards, 1:29.**

**Fourth quarter**

- NYJ – Robby Anderson 7-yard pass from Sam Darnold (Jason Myers kick), 12:06. Tied 20–20. **Drive: 11 plays, 85 yards, 6:02.**
- BUF – Steven Hauschka 36-yard field goal, 2:31. Bills 23–20. **Drive: 9 plays, 62 yards, 3:45.**
- NYJ – Elijah McGuire 1-yard rush (Jason Myers kick), 1:17. Jets 27–23. **Drive: 9 plays, 61 yards, 1:14.**

**Top passers**

- NYJ – Sam Darnold – 16/24, 170 yards, TD, INT
- BUF – Josh Allen – 18/36, 206 yards, 2 INT

**Top rushers**

- NYJ – Elijah McGuire – 17 rushes, 60 yards, TD
- BUF – Josh Allen – 9 rushes, 101 yards, TD

**Top receivers**

- NYJ – Robby Anderson – 4 receptions, 76 yards, TD
- BUF – Robert Foster – 7 receptions, 104 yards

A late touchdown by Jets running back Elijah McGuire proved to be the game-winning score with just over a minute left. With the loss, the Bills fell to 4–9 and were eliminated from playoff contention. Linebacker Matt Milano suffered a broken fibula late in the game, ending his season.

==== Week 15: vs. Detroit Lions ====
Week Fifteen: Detroit Lions at Buffalo Bills – Game summary

Quarter	1	2	3	4	Total
Lions	0	13	0	0	**13**
**Bills**	0	7	0	7	**14**

at New Era Field, Orchard Park, New York

- Date: December 16
- Game time: 1:00 p.m. EST
- Game weather: 39 °F (4 °C), rain
- Game attendance: 59,110
- Referee: Jerome Boger
- TV announcers (Fox): Joe Davis, Brady Quinn, and Bruce Feldman
- Recap, Gamebook

Game information

**First quarter**

- No scoring plays.

**Second quarter**

- DET – Andy Jones 4-yard pass from Matthew Stafford (pass failed), 10:45. **Drive: 9 plays, 75 yards, 4:26.** Lions 6–0.
- BUF – Josh Allen 3-yard run (Steven Hauschka kick), 7:55. **Drive: 5 plays, 87 yards, 2:50.** Bills 7–6.
- DET – Zach Zenner 1-yard run (Matt Prater kick), 3:46. **Drive: 9 plays, 77 yards, 4:09.** Lions 13–7.

**Third quarter**

- No scoring plays.

**Fourth quarter**

- BUF – Robert Foster 42-yard pass from Josh Allen (Steven Hauschka kick), 10:26. **Drive: 2 plays, 61 yards, 1:17.** Bills 14–13.

**Top passers**

- DET – Matthew Stafford – 22/29, 208 yards, TD
- BUF – Josh Allen – 13/26, 204 yards, TD

**Top rushers**

- DET – Theo Riddick – 8 rushes, 47 yards
- BUF – Keith Ford – 14 rushes, 46 yards

**Top receivers**

- DET – Kenny Golladay – 7 receptions, 146 yards
- BUF – Robert Foster – 4 receptions, 108 yards, TD

With running backs LeSean McCoy and Chris Ivory both injured, the Bills relied offensively on Josh Allen and backup halfbacks Marcus Murphy and Keith Ford, who both left the game at some point with their own injuries. Allen passed for 204 yards and a touchdown, adding a rushing score on 16 yards on the ground, as the Bills defense stifled the Lions offense throughout the game except the second quarter. Lions kicker Matt Prater missed a field goal and was unable to kick an extra point earlier due to a botched snap, allowing the Bills to win 14–13.

==== Week 16: at New England Patriots ====
Week Sixteen: Buffalo Bills at New England Patriots – Game summary

Quarter	1	2	3	4	Total
Bills	0	0	6	6	**12**
**Patriots**	7	7	7	3	**24**

at Gillette Stadium, Foxborough, Massachusetts

- Date: December 23
- Game time: 1:00 p.m. EST
- Game weather: 40 °F (4 °C), clear and cold
- Game attendance: 65,878
- Referee: Shawn Smith
- TV announcers (CBS): Greg Gumbel, Trent Green, Bruce Arians, and Melanie Collins
- Recap, Gamebook

Game information

**First quarter**

- NE – Sony Michel 4-yard rush (Stephen Gostkowski kick), 7:32. Patriots 7–0. **Drive: 6 plays, 55 yards, 3:22.**

**Second quarter**

- NE – James White 27-yard rush (Stephen Gostkowski kick), 9:59. Patriots 14–0. **Drive: 5 plays, 56 yards, 2:20.**

**Third quarter**

- BUF – Steven Hauschka 35-yard field goal, 13:29. Patriots 14–3. **Drive: 4 plays, 7 yards, 1:19.**
- BUF – Steven Hauschka 41-yard field goal, 10:06. Patriots 14–6. **Drive: 5 plays, 36 yards, 1:10.**
- NE – Julian Edelman 32-yard pass from Tom Brady (Stephen Gostkowski kick), 5:05. Patriots 21–6. **Drive: 10 plays, 88 yards, 5:01.**

**Fourth quarter**

- NE – Stephen Gostkowski 24-yard field goal, 7:44. Patriots 24–6. **Drive: 6 plays, 19 yards, 3:11.**
- BUF – Zay Jones 31-yard pass from Josh Allen (pass failed), 1:08. Patriots 24–12. **Drive: 9 plays, 80 yards, 1:51.**

**Top passers**

- BUF – Josh Allen – 20/41, 217 yards, TD, 2 INT
- NE – Tom Brady – 13/24, 126 yards, TD, 2 INT

**Top rushers**

- BUF – Keith Ford – 7 rushes, 33 yards
- NE – Sony Michel – 18 rushes, 116 yards, TD

**Top receivers**

- BUF – Zay Jones – 5 receptions, 67 yards, TD
- NE – Julian Edelman – 6 receptions, 70 yards, TD

Allen's first game against the New England Patriots did not fare well for the Bills, as the Patriots won the game 24–12 to clinch the AFC East. In addition, the Bills' special teams unit struggled again. However, the defense was able to limit Tom Brady to just 126 passing yards, one touchdown with two interceptions, but also gave up a massive 273 rushing yards on 47 carries as they were torched by the Patriots rushing offense in the ugly loss. The loss, meant the Bills would fall to 5-10 and finished 2-6 on the road.

==== Week 17: vs. Miami Dolphins ====
Week Seventeen: Miami Dolphins at Buffalo Bills – Game summary

Quarter	1	2	3	4	Total
Dolphins	0	14	3	0	**17**
**Bills**	14	0	14	14	**42**

at New Era Field, Orchard Park, New York

- Date: December 30
- Game time: 1:00 p.m. EST
- Game weather: 33 °F (1 °C), cloudy
- Game attendance: 67,420
- Referee: John Hussey
- TV announcers (CBS): Beth Mowins and Steve Beuerlein
- Recap, Gamebook

Game information

**First quarter**

- BUF – Josh Allen 1-yard run (Stephen Hauschka kick), 10:14. Bills 7–0. **Drive: 9 plays, 66 yards, 4:46.**
- BUF – Zay Jones 18-yard pass from Josh Allen (Stephen Hauschka kick), 8:31. Bills 14–0. **Drive: 1 play, 18 yards, 0:07.**

**Second quarter**

- MIA – Ryan Tannehill 3-yard pass from Kenny Stills (Jason Sanders kick), 0:54. Bills 14–7. **Drive: 11 plays, 51 yards, 3:31.**
- MIA – Reshad Jones 29-yard interception return (Jason Sanders kick), 0:39. Tied 14–14.

**Third quarter**

- BUF – Robert Foster 5-yard pass from Josh Allen (Stephen Hauschka kick), 9:09. Bills 21–14. **Drive: 10 plays, 78 yards, 4:37.**
- BUF – LeSean McCoy 9-yard run (Stephen Hauschka), 6:57. Bills 28–14. **Drive: 5 plays, 23 yards, 1:48.**
- MIA – Jason Sanders 29-yard field goal, 1:28. Bills 28–17. **Drive: 11 plays, 55 yards, 5:29.**

**Fourth quarter**

- BUF – Josh Allen 30-yard run (Stephen Hauschka kick), 11:13. Bills 35–17. **Drive: 3 plays, 70 yards, 1:17.**
- BUF – Zay Jones 26-yard pass from Josh Allen (Stephen Hauschka kick), 7:44. Bills 42–17. **Drive: 2 plays, 52 yards, 0:25.**

**Top passers**

- MIA – Ryan Tannehill – 18/31, 147 yards, 2 INT
- BUF – Josh Allen – 17/26, 224 yards, 3 TD, INT

**Top rushers**

- MIA – Kalen Ballage – 12 rushes, 27 yards
- BUF – Josh Allen – 9 rushes, 95 yards, 2 TD

**Top receivers**

- MIA – Kenyan Drake – 5 receptions, 52 yards
- BUF – Zay Jones – 6 receptions, 93 yards, 2 TD

Similar to the previous year's season finale, a fight broke out between the Bills and Dolphins in the second half. After Dolphins linebacker and former Bill Kiko Alonso collided with Josh Allen, Alonso, along with Dolphins DE Robert Quinn and Bills lineman Jordan Mills, were ejected following the scuffle. Despite a close first half, the Bills won 42–17 to finish the 2018 season at 6–10. Buffalo also finished 2-4 against the AFC East and 4-4 at home. This was also the final NFL game for longtime defensive tackle Kyle Williams, as he announced his intention to retire after the season's conclusion. As of 2025, this marks the last time the Bills finished with a losing record.

=== Standings ===
==== Division ====
AFC East
	W	L	T	PCT	DIV	CONF	PF	PA	STK
^{(2)} New England Patriots	11	5	0	.688	5–1	8–4	436	325	W2
Miami Dolphins	7	9	0	.438	4–2	6–6	319	433	L3
Buffalo Bills	6	10	0	.375	2–4	4–8	269	374	W1
New York Jets	4	12	0	.250	1–5	3–9	333	441	L3

==== Conference ====
AFC
#	Team	Division	W	L	T	PCT	DIV	CONF	SOS	SOV	STK
**Division leaders**
1 (Note: Kansas City finished ahead of LA Chargers in the AFC West based on division record, claiming the No. 1 seed.)	Kansas City Chiefs	West	12	4	0	.750	5–1	10–2	.480	.401	W1
2 (Note: New England claimed the No. 2 seed over Houston based on head-to-head victory.)	New England Patriots	East	11	5	0	.688	5–1	8–4	.482	.494	W2
3	Houston Texans	South	11	5	0	.688	4–2	9–3	.471	.435	W1
4	Baltimore Ravens	North	10	6	0	.625	3–3	8–4	.496	.450	W3
**Wild Cards**
5	Los Angeles Chargers	West	12	4	0	.750	4–2	9–3	.477	.422	W1
6	Indianapolis Colts	South	10	6	0	.625	4–2	7–5	.465	.456	W4
**Did not qualify for the postseason**
7	Pittsburgh Steelers	North	9	6	1	.594	4–1–1	6–5–1	.504	.448	W1
8	Tennessee Titans	South	9	7	0	.563	3–3	5–7	.520	.465	L1
9	Cleveland Browns	North	7	8	1	.469	3–2–1	5–6–1	.516	.411	L1
10	Miami Dolphins	East	7	9	0	.438	4–2	6–6	.469	.446	L3
11 (Note: Denver finished ahead of Cincinnati and Buffalo based on strength of victory. Cincinnati finished ahead of Buffalo based on record vs. common opponents. Cincinnati's cumulative record against Baltimore, Indianapolis, the Los Angeles Chargers and Miami was 3–2, compared to Buffalo's 1–4 cumulative record against the same four teams.)	Denver Broncos	West	6	10	0	.375	2–4	4–8	.523	.464	L4
12	Cincinnati Bengals	North	6	10	0	.375	1–5	4–8	.535	.448	L2
13	Buffalo Bills	East	6	10	0	.375	2–4	4–8	.523	.411	W1
14	Jacksonville Jaguars	South	5	11	0	.313	1–5	4–8	.549	.463	L1
15 (Note: NY Jets finished ahead of Oakland based on strength of victory.)	New York Jets	East	4	12	0	.250	1–5	3–9	.506	.438	L3
16	Oakland Raiders	West	4	12	0	.250	1–5	3–9	.547	.406	L1
**Tiebreakers** (Note: When breaking ties for three or more teams under the NFL's rules, they are first broken within divisions, then comparing only the highest ranked remaining team from each division.)
