= 2018 Jacksonville Jaguars season =

24th season in franchise history

- Owner: Shahid Khan
- General manager: David Caldwell
- Head coach: Doug Marrone
- Offensive coordinator: Nathaniel Hackett
- Defensive coordinator: Todd Wash
- Home stadium: TIAA Bank Field

Results
- Record: 5–11
- Division place: 4th AFC South
- Playoffs: Did not qualify
- Pro Bowlers: CB Jalen Ramsey; DE Calais Campbell

Uniform
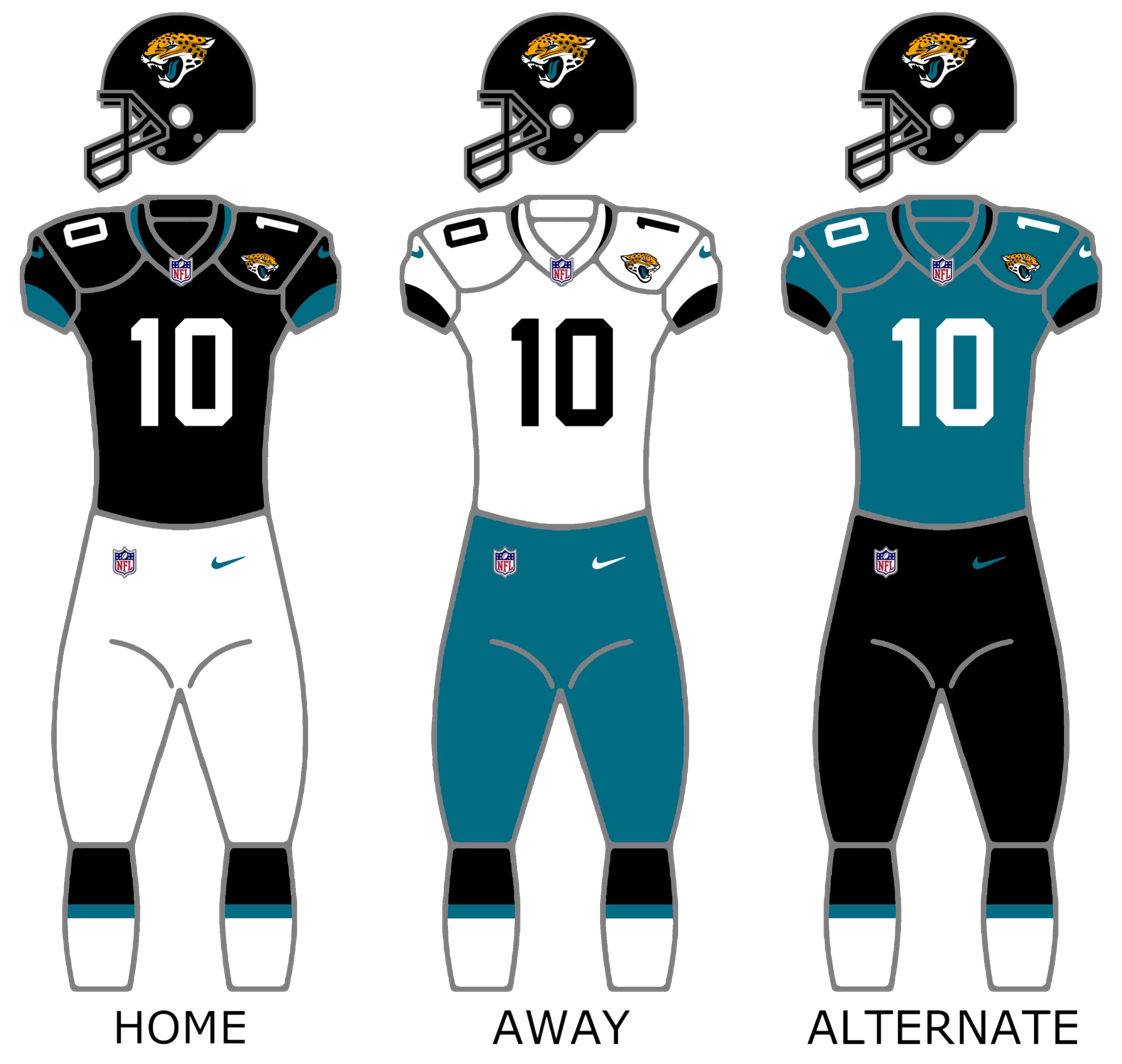

The 2018 season was the Jacksonville Jaguars' 24th in the National Football League (NFL) and their second under head coach Doug Marrone. This was their first season in new uniforms, which were revealed in April 2018. The Jaguars had hopes of matching or improving on their 10–6 campaign from the year prior, but despite a 3–1 start, the Jags fell into a 7 game losing streak and failed to improve on their 10–6 record after a Week 10 loss to the Colts. After they lost to the Tennessee Titans in Week 14, the Jaguars fell to 4–9 and were officially eliminated from postseason contention. They finished 5–11, in last place in the AFC South.

== On and off-the-field events ==
While not as widely covered as the turmoils of the Pittsburgh Steelers during the same season, the 2018 Jaguars experienced several off-the-field incidents as well as conflict among team members. The team was by criticized by the media and fans for missing the playoffs after a 3-1 start, as well as Leonard Fournette’s questionable work ethic and behavior during the team’s seven-game losing streak. Cornerback Jalen Ramsey was criticized for calling over a dozen quarterbacks, most notably the Buffalo Bills’ Josh Allen “trash” before the season started in August 2018.

Before the team’s Week 8 matchup against the defending Super Bowl champion Philadelphia Eagles in London, several Jaguars players (Ronnie Harrison, D. J. Hayden, and Jarrod Wilson) were arrested after walking out on a $64,000 bar tab at the London Reign Showclub. When they were given the bill, an argument broke out, and police were called. The club eventually dropped the complaint and the players were released without charges when the tab was settled.

On November 25, 2018, during the team’s Week 12 matchup against the Buffalo Bills, Leonard Fournette left the bench and fought Buffalo defensive lineman Shaq Lawson. The NFL suspended Fournette one game for violating the league's unsportsmanlike conduct and unnecessary roughness rules. Jaguars management informed Fournette they were voiding the guaranteed money remaining in his contract as punishment, which Fournette appealed with the league. On December 6, 2018, during the Week 16 game against the Tennessee Titans, Fournette was caught on video shouting at a Titans fan in the stands before being restrained.

== Offseason ==
=== NFL draft ===
2018 Jacksonville Jaguars draft
Round	Pick	Player	Position	College	Notes
1	29	Taven Bryan	Defensive tackle	Florida	
2	61	D. J. Chark *	Wide receiver	LSU	
3	93	Ronnie Harrison	Safety	Alabama	
4	129	Will Richardson	Offensive tackle	NC State	
6	203	Tanner Lee	Quarterback	Nebraska	
7	230	Leon Jacobs	Linebacker	Wisconsin	From Cincinnati
7	247	Logan Cooke *	Punter	Mississippi State	
Made roster * Made at least one Pro Bowl during career

Draft trades

- The Jaguars traded a conditional sixth-round selection to Buffalo in exchange for defensive tackle Marcell Dareus. This pick became a fifth-round selection (166th overall) after Dareus remained on Jacksonville's roster for the remainder of the 2017 season and the Jaguars made the playoffs.
- The Jaguars traded defensive end Chris Smith to the Bengals in exchange for a conditional selection. As Smith was on the Bengals' active roster for at least six games during the 2017 season, Jacksonville acquired Cincinnati's seventh-round selection (230th overall).

=== Undrafted free agents ===
Name	Position	College
Tre Herndon	Cornerback	Vanderbilt
Manase Hungalu	Linebacker	Oregon State
Allen Lazard	Wide receiver	Iowa State

== Staff ==
2018 Jacksonville Jaguars staff
Front office: Owner – Shahid Khan; President – Mark Lamping; Executive vice president of football operations – Tom Coughlin; General manager – David Caldwell; Senior vice president of football administration & technology – Tony Khan; Special assistant to the general manager – John Idzik Jr.; Director of football administration – Tim Walsh; Director of football operations – Hamzah Ahmad; Director of professional scouting – Chris Polian; Assistant director of player personnel – Andy Dengler; Director of pro personnel – Chris Driggers; Assistant director of pro personnel – DeJuan Polk; Director of college scouting – Mark Ellenz; Assistant director of college scouting – Paul Roell; Director of player development and youth football – Marcus Pollard; Assistant to the head coach/administrator of coaching operations – ElizaBeth Mayers; Director of team administration – Tyler Wolf; Head coaches: Head coach – Doug Marrone; Offensive coaches: Offensive coordinator – Nathaniel Hackett; Interim offensive coordinator/quarterbacks – Scott Milanovich; Running backs – Tyrone Wheatley; Wide receivers – Keenan McCardell; Tight ends – Ron Middleton; Offensive line – Pat Flaherty; Assistant offensive line – Tony Sparano; Offensive assistant – John Donovan; Offense research – Eric Price	Defensive coaches: Defensive coordinator – Todd Wash; Defensive line – Marion Hobby; Assistant defensive line – Jason Rebrovich; Linebackers – Mark Collins; Assistant linebackers – Mike Rutenberg; Secondary – Perry Fewell; Assistant defensive backs – Joe Danna; Special teams coaches: Special teams coordinator – Joe DeCamillis; Assistant special teams – Mike Mallory; Strength and conditioning: Strength and conditioning – Tom Myslinski; Assistant strength and conditioning – Cedric Scott; Strength & conditioning associate – Alex Hampton; Strength & conditioning associate – Jess Langvardt

== Final roster ==
2018 Jacksonville Jaguars roster
Quarterbacks (QB): 5 Blake Bortles; 6 Cody Kessler; 3 Tanner Lee; Running backs (RB): 40 Tommy Bohanon FB; 35 Dimitri Flowers; 27 Leonard Fournette; 34 Carlos Hyde; 33 David Williams; 24 T. J. Yeldon; Wide receivers (WR): 17 D. J. Chark; 84 Keelan Cole; 13 Rashad Greene; 10 Donte Moncrief; 12 Dede Westbrook; Tight ends (TE): 87 Blake Bell; 83 Ben Koyack; 80 James O'Shaughnessy	Offensive linemen (OL): 60 A. J. Cann G; 75 Ereck Flowers T; 77 Patrick Omameh G; 64 Chris Reed G; 79 Corey Robinson T; 69 Tyler Shatley C; 70 Brandon Thomas G; Defensive linemen (DL): 54 Eli Ankou DT; 90 Taven Bryan DT; 93 Calais Campbell DE; 99 Marcell Dareus DT; 97 Malik Jackson DT; 92 Lyndon Johnson DE; 95 Abry Jones DT; 55 Lerentee McCray DE; 91 Yannick Ngakoue DE; 94 Dawuane Smoot DE	Linebackers (LB): 53 Blair Brown OLB; 57 Nick DeLuca OLB; 44 Myles Jack MLB; 52 Donald Payne MLB; 50 Telvin Smith OLB; Defensive backs (DB): 31 Breon Borders CB; 21 A. J. Bouye CB; 22 Cody Davis FS; 39 Tashaun Gipson FS; 25 D. J. Hayden CB; 41 Tre Herndon CB; 43 Quenton Meeks CB; 23 Tyler Patmon CB; 20 Jalen Ramsey CB; 38 C. J. Reavis SS; 26 Jarrod Wilson SS; Special teams (ST): 9 Logan Cooke P; 2 Kai Forbath K; 45 Matt Overton LS	Practice squad: 16 C. J. Board WR; 61 Michael Dunn T; 49 Christian Kuntz LS; 14 Andre Levrone WR; 62 K. C. McDermott G; 86 Pharaoh McKever TE; 66 Salesi Uhatafe G; 15 Jordan Veasy WR; Reserve: 30 Corey Grant RB (IR); 36 Ronnie Harrison SS (IR); 67 Michael Hughes DT (IR); 48 Leon Jacobs OLB (IR); 4 Josh Lambo K (IR); 11 Marqise Lee WR (IR); 65 Brandon Linder C (IR); 85 Jaydon Mickens WR (IR); 68 Andrew Norwell G (IR); 78 Jermey Parnell T (IR); 76 Will Richardson T (IR); 74 Cam Robinson T (IR); 88 Austin Seferian-Jenkins TE (IR); 46 Carson Tinker LS (IR); 73 Josh Walker G (IR); 72 Josh Wells T (IR); Rookies in italics 53 active, 16 reserve, 8 practice squad

== Preseason ==
The Jaguars' preseason opponents and schedule were announced on April 11. Exact dates and times were finalized on April 19, when the regular season schedule was announced.

Week	Date	Opponent	Result	Record	Venue	Recap
1	August 9	New Orleans Saints	L 20–24	0–1	TIAA Bank Field	Recap
2	August 18	at Minnesota Vikings	W 14–10	1–1	U.S. Bank Stadium	Recap
3	August 25	Atlanta Falcons	W 17–6	2–1	TIAA Bank Field	Recap
4	August 30	at Tampa Bay Buccaneers	W 25–10	3–1	Raymond James Stadium	Recap

== Regular season ==
=== Schedule ===
On January 11, 2018, the NFL announced that the Jaguars would play host to the Philadelphia Eagles at Wembley Stadium in London, England, as part of their commitment to the London Games. The game occurred during Week 8 (October 28), and was televised in the United States.

Week	Date	Opponent	Result	Record	Venue	Recap
1	September 9	at New York Giants	**W** 20–15	1–0	MetLife Stadium	Recap
2	September 16	New England Patriots	**W** 31–20	2–0	TIAA Bank Field	Recap
3	September 23	**Tennessee Titans**	**L** 6–9	2–1	TIAA Bank Field	Recap
4	September 30	New York Jets	**W** 31–12	3–1	TIAA Bank Field	Recap
5	October 7	at Kansas City Chiefs	**L** 14–30	3–2	Arrowhead Stadium	Recap
6	October 14	at Dallas Cowboys	**L** 7–40	3–3	AT&T Stadium	Recap
7	October 21	**Houston Texans**	**L** 7–20	3–4	TIAA Bank Field	Recap
8	October 28	Philadelphia Eagles	**L** 18–24	3–5	(United Kingdom) Wembley Stadium (London)	Recap
9	Bye					
10	November 11	at **Indianapolis Colts**	**L** 26–29	3–6	Lucas Oil Stadium	Recap
11	November 18	Pittsburgh Steelers	**L** 16–20	3–7	TIAA Bank Field	Recap
12	November 25	at Buffalo Bills	**L** 21–24	3–8	New Era Field	Recap
13	December 2	**Indianapolis Colts**	**W** 6–0	4–8	TIAA Bank Field	Recap
14	December 6	at **Tennessee Titans**	**L** 9–30	4–9	Nissan Stadium	Recap
15	December 16	Washington Redskins	**L** 13–16	4–10	TIAA Bank Field	Recap
16	December 23	at Miami Dolphins	**W** 17–7	5–10	Hard Rock Stadium	Recap
17	December 30	at **Houston Texans**	**L** 3–20	5–11	NRG Stadium	Recap

Note: Intra-division opponents are in bold text.

=== Game summaries ===
==== Week 1: at New York Giants ====
Week One: Jacksonville Jaguars at New York Giants – Game summary

Quarter	1	2	3	4	Total
**Jaguars**	3	10	0	7	**20**
Giants	3	3	3	6	**15**

at MetLife Stadium, East Rutherford, New Jersey

- Date: September 9
- Game time: 1:00 p.m. EDT
- Game weather: Rain, 59 °F (15 °C)
- Game attendance: 77,992
- Referee: Craig Wrolstad
- TV announcers (Fox): Kenny Albert, Ronde Barber and Tiki Barber
- Recap, Game Book

Game information

**First quarter**

- JAX – Josh Lambo 39-yard field goal, 10:12. Jaguars 3–0. **Drive: 11 plays, 59 yards, 4:49.**
- NYG – Aldrick Rosas 27-yard field goal, 0:23. Tied 3–3. **Drive: 9 plays, 54 yards, 5:17.**

**Second quarter**

- JAX – Josh Lambo 39-yard field goal, 7:19. Jaguars 6–3. **Drive: 15 plays, 54 yards, 8:04.**
- JAX – T.J. Yeldon 1-yard pass from Blake Bortles (Josh Lambo kick), 2:42. Jaguars 13–3. **Drive: 5 plays, 57 yards, 2:36.**
- NYG – Aldrick Rosas 31-yard field goal, 0:04. Jaguars 13–6. **Drive: 10 plays, 62 yards, 2:38.**

**Third quarter**

- NYG – Aldrick Rosas 44-yard field goal, 9:18. Jaguars 13–9. **Drive: 11 plays, 49 yards, 5:42.**

**Fourth quarter**

- JAX – Myles Jack 32-yard interception return (Josh Lambo kick), 11:24 Jaguars 20–9.
- NYG – Saquon Barkley 68-yard run (run failed), 10:38. Jaguars 20–15. **Drive: 2 plays, 75 yards, 0:45.**

**Top passers**

- JAX – Blake Bortles – 18/31, 176 yards, TD, INT
- NYG – Eli Manning – 23/37, 224 yards, INT

**Top rushers**

- JAX – T.J. Yeldon – 14 rushes, 51 yards
- NYG – Saquon Barkley – 18 rushes, 106 yards, TD

**Top receivers**

- JAX – Keelan Cole – 3 receptions, 54 yards
- NYG – Odell Beckham Jr. – 11 receptions, 111 yards

==== Week 2: vs. New England Patriots ====
Week Two: New England Patriots at Jacksonville Jaguars – Game summary

Quarter	1	2	3	4	Total
Patriots	0	3	7	10	**20**
**Jaguars**	14	7	3	7	**31**

at TIAA Bank Field, Jacksonville, Florida

- Date: September 16
- Game time: 4:25 p.m. EDT
- Game weather: 97 °F (36 °C)
- Game attendance: 68,527
- Referee: Carl Cheffers
- TV announcers (CBS): Jim Nantz, Tony Romo and Tracy Wolfson
- Recap, Game Book

Game information

**First quarter**

- JAX – Donte Moncrief 4-yard pass from Blake Bortles (Josh Lambo kick), 7:46. Jaguars 7–0. **Drive: 9 plays, 56 yards, 3:52.**
- JAX – Keelan Cole 24-yard pass from Blake Bortles (Josh Lambo kick), 2:10. Jaguars 14–0. **Drive: 7 plays, 84 yards, 3:52.**

**Second quarter**

- NE – Stephen Gostkowski 29-yard field goal, 2:45. Jaguars 14–3. **Drive: 16 plays, 83 yards, 8:20.**
- JAX – Austin Seferian-Jenkins 4-yard pass from Blake Bortles (Josh Lambo kick), 0:09. Jaguars 21–3. **Drive: 13 plays, 75 yards, 2:36.**

**Third quarter**

- JAX – Josh Lambo 28-yard field goal, 7:50. Jaguars 24–3. **Drive: 15 plays, 71 yards, 7:10.**
- NE – Chris Hogan 7-yard pass from Tom Brady (Stephen Gostkowski kick), 1:42. Jaguars 24–10. **Drive: 8 plays, 48 yards, 4:06.**

**Fourth quarter**

- NE – Stephen Gostkowski 46-yard field goal, 14:10. Jaguars 24–13. **Drive: 5 plays, 31 yards, 1:27.**
- JAX – Dede Westbrook 61-yard pass from Blake Bortles (Josh Lambo kick), 7:35. Jaguars 31–13. **Drive: 1 play, 61 yards, 0:13.**
- NE – Chris Hogan 29-yard pass from Tom Brady (Stephen Gostkowski kick), 3:40. Jaguars 31–20. **Drive: 8 plays, 75 yards, 3:55.**

**Top passers**

- NE – Tom Brady – 24/35, 234 yards, 2 TD
- JAX – Blake Bortles – 29/45, 377 yards, 4 TD, INT

**Top rushers**

- NE – Sony Michel – 10 rushes, 34 yards
- JAX – T.J. Yeldon – 10 rushes, 58 yards

**Top receivers**

- NE – James White – 7 receptions, 73 yards
- JAX – Keelan Cole – 7 receptions, 116 yards, TD

The Jaguars recorded their first-ever regular-season win against the Patriots and ended their eight-game losing streak against them, beating them for the first time since their 1998 AFC Wild Card win.

==== Week 3: vs. Tennessee Titans ====
Week Three: Tennessee Titans at Jacksonville Jaguars – Game summary

Quarter	1	2	3	4	Total
**Titans**	3	0	3	3	**9**
Jaguars	0	3	0	3	**6**

at TIAA Bank Field, Jacksonville, Florida

- Date: September 23
- Game time: 1:00 p.m. EDT
- Game weather: 89 °F (32 °C)
- Game attendance: 64,015
- Referee: Shawn Smith
- TV announcers (CBS): Spero Dedes and Adam Archuleta
- Recap, Game Book

Game information

**First quarter**

- TEN – Ryan Succop 39-yard field goal, 4:59. Titans 3–0. **Drive: 9 plays, 26 yards, 4:11.**

**Second quarter**

- JAX – Josh Lambo 46-yard field goal, 8:54. Tied 3–3. **Drive: 11 plays, 34 yards, 5:23.**

**Third quarter**

- TEN – Ryan Succop 36-yard field goal, 10:01. Titans 6–3. **Drive: 9 plays, 57 yards, 4:59.**

**Fourth quarter**

- JAX – Josh Lambo 38-yard field goal, 10:48. Tied 6–6. **Drive: 13 plays, 68 yards, 6:39.**
- TEN – Ryan Succop 28-yard field goal, 4:06. Titans 9–6. **Drive: 12 plays, 65 yards, 6:42.**

**Top passers**

- TEN – Marcus Mariota – 12/18, 100 yards
- JAX – Blake Bortles – 21/34, 155 yards

**Top rushers**

- TEN – Derrick Henry – 18 rushes, 57 yards
- JAX – T.J. Yeldon – 7 rushes, 44 yards

**Top receivers**

- TEN – Taywan Taylor – 4 receptions, 30 yards
- JAX – T.J. Yeldon – 6 receptions, 46 yards

==== Week 4: vs. New York Jets ====
Week Four: New York Jets at Jacksonville Jaguars – Game summary

Quarter	1	2	3	4	Total
Jets	0	0	3	9	**12**
**Jaguars**	3	13	9	6	**31**

at TIAA Bank Field, Jacksonville, Florida

- Date: September 30
- Game time: 1:00 p.m. EDT
- Game weather: Partly cloudy, 86 °F (30 °C)
- Game attendance: 65,353
- Referee: Clay Martin
- TV announcers (Fox): Dan Hellie, Jeff Fisher and Karyn Bryant
- Recap, Game Book

Game information

**First quarter**

- JAX – Josh Lambo 32-yard field goal, 3:41. Jaguars 3–0. **Drive: 15 plays, 80 yards, 8:38.**

**Second quarter**

- JAX – Josh Lambo 22-yard field goal, 9:25. Jaguars 6–0. **Drive: 12 plays, 73 yards, 6:59.**
- JAX – T.J. Yeldon 31-yard pass from Blake Bortles (Josh Lambo kick), 1:47. Jaguars 13–0. **Drive: 7 plays, 78 yards, 2:59.**
- JAX – Josh Lambo 54-yard field goal, 0:29. Jaguars 16–0. **Drive: 5 plays, 29 yards, 0:31.**

**Third quarter**

- JAX – Isaiah Crowell tackled in the end zone for safety, 12:22. Jaguars 18–0.
- NYJ – Jason Myers 27-yard field goal, 4:58. Jaguars 18–3. **Drive: 7 plays, 14 yards, 2:00.**
- JAX – Donte Moncrief 67-yard pass from Blake Bortles (Josh Lambo kick), 3:40. Jaguars 25–3. **Drive: 3 plays, 75 yards, 1:18.**

**Fourth quarter'**

- NYJ – Jason Myers 38-yard field goal, 12:53. Jaguars 25–6. **Drive: 7 plays, 50 yards, 2:40.**
- NYJ – Jordan Leggett 2-yard pass from Sam Darnold (pass failed), 11:18. Jaguars 25–12. **Drive: 3 plays, 5 yards, 1:26.**
- JAX – T.J. Yeldon 1-yard run (pass failed), 0:25. Jaguars 31–12. **Drive: 9 plays, 65 yards, 3:57.**

**Top passers**

- NYJ – Sam Darnold – 17/34, 167 yards, TD
- JAX – Blake Bortles – 29/38, 388 yards, 2 TD, INT

**Top rushers**

- NYJ – Bilal Powell – 8 rushes, 26 yards
- JAX – T.J. Yeldon – 18 rushes, 52 yards, TD

**Top receivers**

- NYJ – Quincy Enunwa – 4 receptions, 66 yards
- JAX – Dede Westbrook – 9 receptions, 130 yards

==== Week 5: at Kansas City Chiefs ====
Week Five: Jacksonville Jaguars at Kansas City Chiefs – Game summary

Quarter	1	2	3	4	Total
Jaguars	0	0	7	7	**14**
**Chiefs**	7	13	3	7	**30**

at Arrowhead Stadium, Kansas City, Missouri

- Date: October 7
- Game time: 1:00 p.m. EDT/12:00 p.m. CDT
- Game weather: Cloudy, 58 °F (14 °C)
- Game attendance: 75,289
- Referee: Brad Allen
- TV announcers (CBS): Jim Nantz, Tony Romo and Tracy Wolfson
- Recap, Game Book

Game information

**First quarter**

- KC – Patrick Mahomes 4-yard run (Harrison Butker kick), 6:39. Chiefs 7–0. **Drive: 10 plays, 73 yards, 5:23.**

**Second quarter**

- KC – Harrison Butker 22-yard field goal, 13:30. Chiefs 10–0. **Drive: 14 plays, 82 yards, 5:51.**
- KC – Harrison Butker 42-yard field goal, 1:56. Chiefs 13–0. **Drive: 6 plays, 27 yards, 2:15.**
- KC – Chris Jones 20-yard interception return (Harrison Butker kick), 1:49. Chiefs 20–0.

**Third quarter**

- KC – Harrison Butker 38-yard field goal, 5:27. Chiefs 23–0. **Drive: 12 plays, 78 yards, 5:36.**
- JAX – T. J. Yeldon 14-yard pass from Blake Bortles (Josh Lambo kick), 3:10. Chiefs 23–7. **Drive: 6 plays, 75 yards, 2:17.**

**Fourth quarter**

- KC – Kareem Hunt 4-yard run (Harrison Butker kick), 14:57. Chiefs 30–7. **Drive: 6 plays, 79 yards, 3:13.**
- JAX – Blake Bortles 21-yard run (Josh Lambo kick), 5:46. Chiefs 30–14. **Drive: 14 plays, 58 yards, 4:02.**

**Top passers**

- JAX – Blake Bortles – 33/61, 430 yards, TD, 4 INT
- KC – Patrick Mahomes – 22/38, 313 yards, 2 INT

**Top rushers**

- JAX – T. J. Yeldon – 10 carries, 53 yards
- KC – Kareem Hunt – 22 carries, 87 yards, TD

**Top receivers**

- JAX – T.J. Yeldon – 8 receptions, 69 yards, TD
- KC – Sammy Watkins – 6 receptions, 78 yards

==== Week 6: at Dallas Cowboys ====
Week Six: Jacksonville Jaguars at Dallas Cowboys – Game summary

Quarter	1	2	3	4	Total
Jaguars	0	0	7	0	**7**
**Cowboys**	10	14	6	10	**40**

at AT&T Stadium, Arlington, Texas

- Date: October 14
- Game time: 4:25 p.m. EDT/3:25 p.m. CDT
- Game weather: Played indoors (retractable roof closed)
- Game attendance: 90,767
- Referee: Tony Corrente
- TV announcers (CBS): Jim Nantz, Tony Romo and Tracy Wolfson
- Recap, Game Book

Game information

**First quarter**

- DAL – Brett Maher 50-yard field goal, 8:36. Cowboys 3–0. **Drive: 9 plays, 51 yards, 4:19.**
- DAL – Dak Prescott 17-yard run (Brett Maher kick), 3:47. Cowboys 10–0. **Drive: 7 plays, 48 yards, 3:26.**

**Second quarter**

- DAL – Cole Beasley 17-yard pass from Dak Prescott (Brett Maher kick), 9:28. Cowboys 17–0. **Drive: 9 plays, 84 yards, 4:49.**
- DAL – Cole Beasley 9-yard pass from Dak Prescott (Brett Maher kick), 0:41. Cowboys 24–0. **Drive: 16 plays, 78 yards, 7:14.**

**Third quarter**

- JAX – Dede Westbrook 34-yard pass from Blake Bortles (Josh Lambo kick), 7:31. Cowboys 24–7. **Drive: 8 plays, 82 yards, 3:27.**
- DAL – Brett Maher 46-yard field goal, 3:69. Cowboys 27–7. **Drive: 9 plays, 47 yards, 4:25.**
- DAL – Brett Maher 32-yard field goal, 1:17. Cowboys 30–7. **Drive: 4 plays, -6 yards, 1:31.**

**Fourth quarter**

- DAL – Ezekiel Elliott 15-yard run (Brett Maher kick), 14:54. Cowboys 37–7. **Drive: 2 plays, 31 yards, 1:16.**
- DAL – Brett Maher 55-yard field goal, 7:07. Cowboys 40–7. **Drive: 8 plays, 15 yards, 4:39.**

**Top passers**

- JAX – Blake Bortles – 15/26, 149 yards, TD, INT
- DAL – Dak Prescott – 17/27, 183 yards, 2 TD

**Top rushers**

- JAX – T. J. Yeldon – 8 rushes, 41 yards
- DAL – Ezekiel Elliott – 24 rushes, 106 yards, TD

**Top receivers**

- JAX – Keelan Cole – 4 receptions, 41 yards
- DAL – Cole Beasley – 9 receptions, 101 yards, 2 TD

==== Week 7: vs. Houston Texans ====
Week Seven: Houston Texans at Jacksonville Jaguars – Game summary

Quarter	1	2	3	4	Total
**Texans**	6	7	7	0	**20**
Jaguars	0	0	7	0	**7**

at TIAA Bank Field, Jacksonville, Florida

- Date: October 21
- Game time: 1:00 p.m. EDT
- Game weather: 68 °F (20 °C)
- Game attendance: 66,534
- Referee: Ronald Torbert
- TV announcers (CBS): Andrew Catalon and James Lofton
- Recap, Game Book

Game information

**First quarter**

- HOU – Kaʻimi Fairbairn 44-yard field goal, 10:22. Texans 3–0. **Drive: 7 plays, 10 yards, 3:15.**
- HOU – Kaʻimi Fairbairn 47-yard field goal, 2:39. Texans 6–0. **Drive: 9 plays, 61 yards, 4:46.**

**Second quarter**

- HOU – Lamar Miller 5-yard run (Kaʻimi Fairbairn kick), 5:31. Texans 13–0. **Drive: 10 plays, 60 yards, 4:55.**

**Third quarter**

- HOU – DeAndre Hopkins 10-yard pass from Deshaun Watson (Kaʻimi Fairbairn kick), 10:50. Texans 20–0. **Drive: 2 plays, 12 yards, 0:37.**
- JAX – T.J. Yeldon 6-yard pass from Cody Kessler (Josh Lambo kick), 2:18. Texans 20–7. **Drive: 10 plays, 47 yards, 4:37.**

**Fourth quarter**

- No scoring plays.

**Top passers**

- HOU – Deshaun Watson – 12/24, 139 yards, TD
- JAX – Cody Kessler – 21/30, 156 yards, TD, INT

**Top rushers**

- HOU – Lamar Miller – 22 carries, 100 yards, TD
- JAX – Blake Bortles – 6 carries, 30 yards

**Top receivers**

- HOU – Will Fuller – 6 receptions, 68 yards
- JAX – Donte Moncrief – 7 receptions, 76 yards

==== Week 8: vs. Philadelphia Eagles ====
NFL London Games

Week Eight: Philadelphia Eagles at Jacksonville Jaguars – Game summary

Quarter	1	2	3	4	Total
**Eagles**	0	10	7	7	**24**
Jaguars	3	3	6	6	**18**

at Wembley Stadium, London, England

- Date: October 28
- Game time: 1:30 p.m. GMT/9:30 a.m. EDT
- Game weather: Partly cloudy, 48 °F (9 °C)
- Game attendance: 85,870
- Referee: John Hussey
- TV announcers (NFLN): Rich Eisen, Steve Mariucci, Kurt Warner, Michael Irvin, Melissa Stark and Peter Schrager
- Recap, Game Book

Game information

**First quarter**

- JAX – Josh Lambo 50-yard field goal, 6:50. Jaguars 3–0. **Drive: 9 plays, 39 yards, 5:05.**

**Second quarter**

- PHI – Jake Elliott 31-yard field goal, 7:43. Tied 3–3. **Drive: 13 plays, 64 yards, 7:05.**
- JAX – Josh Lambo 57-yard field goal, 2:43. Jaguars 6–3. **Drive: 8 plays, 36 yards, 5:00.**
- PHI – Dallas Goedert 32-yard pass from Carson Wentz (Jake Elliott kick), 0:29. Eagles 10–6. **Drive: 4 plays, 44 yards, 1:00.**

**Third quarter**

- PHI – Wendell Smallwood 36-yard pass from Carson Wentz (Jake Elliott kick), 8:39. Eagles 17–6. **Drive: 9 plays, 95 yards, 5:00.**
- JAX – Dede Westbrook 11-yard pass from Blake Bortles (pass failed), 4:33. Eagles 17–12. **Drive: 9 plays, 75 yards, 4:06.**

**Fourth quarter**

- JAX – Josh Lambo 33-yard field goal, 13:10. Eagles 17–15. **Drive: 11 plays, 37 yards, 4:57.**
- PHI – Zach Ertz 5-yard pass from Carson Wentz (Jake Elliott kick), 9:55. Eagles 24–15. **Drive: 6 plays, 75 yards, 3:15.**
- JAX – Josh Lambo 24-yard field goal, 6:57. Eagles 24–18. **Drive: 10 plays, 69 yards, 2:58.**

**Top passers**

- PHI – Carson Wentz – 21/30, 286 yards, 3 TD, INT
- JAX – Blake Bortles – 24/41, 286 yards, TD

**Top rushers**

- PHI – Josh Adams – 9 rushes, 61 yards
- JAX – Blake Bortles – 8 rushes, 43 yards

**Top receivers**

- PHI – Jordan Matthews – 4 receptions, 93 yards
- JAX – T. J. Yeldon – 7 receptions, 83 yards

==== Week 10: at Indianapolis Colts ====
Week Ten: Jacksonville Jaguars at Indianapolis Colts – Game summary

Quarter	1	2	3	4	Total
Jaguars	7	9	7	3	**26**
**Colts**	14	15	0	0	**29**

at Lucas Oil Stadium, Indianapolis, Indiana

- Date: November 11
- Game time: 1:00 p.m. EST
- Game weather: Played indoors (retractable roof closed)
- Game attendance: 57,473
- Referee: Jerome Boger
- TV announcers (CBS): Spero Dedes and Adam Archuleta
- Recap, Game Book

Game information

**First quarter**

- IND – Eric Ebron 53-yard pass from Andrew Luck (Adam Vinatieri kick), 11:26. Colts 7–0. **Drive: 7 plays, 75 yards, 3:34.**
- JAX – Donte Moncrief 80-yard pass from Blake Bortles (Josh Lambo kick), 2:58. Tied 7–7. **Drive: 5 plays, 97 yards, 2:42.**
- IND – Eric Ebron 2-yard run (Adam Vinatieri kick), 0:00. Colts 14–7. **Drive: 6 plays, 70 yards, 2:58.**

**Second quarter**

- IND – Eric Ebron 12-yard pass from Andrew Luck (Adam Vinatieri kick), 9:19. Colts 21–7. **Drive: 7 plays, 86 yards, 2:52.**
- JAX – Leonard Fournette 1-yard run (kick blocked), 5:53. Colts 21–13. **Drive: 6 plays, 54 yards, 3:26.**
- IND – Mo Alie-Cox 1-yard pass from Andrew Luck (run succeeded), 1:46. Colts 29–13. **Drive: 10 plays, 50 yards, 4:07.**
- JAX – Josh Lambo 28-yard field goal, 0:05. Colts 29–16. **Drive: 10 plays, 50 yards, 1:41.**

**Third quarter**

- JAX – Leonard Fournette 1-yard pass from Blake Bortles (Josh Lambo kick), 6:25. Colts 29–23. **Drive: 17 plays, 75 yards, 8:35.**

**Fourth quarter**

- JAX – Josh Lambo 55-yard field goal, 4:03. Colts 29–26. **Drive: 8 plays, 27 yards, 4:15.**

**Top passers**

- JAX – Blake Bortles – 26/38, 320 yards, 2 TD
- IND – Andrew Luck – 21/29, 285 yards, 3 TD, INT

**Top rushers**

- JAX – Leonard Fournette – 24 carries, 53 yards, TD
- IND – Jordan Wilkins – 1 carry, 53 yards

**Top receivers**

- JAX – Donte Moncrief – 3 receptions, 98 yards, TD
- IND – T. Y. Hilton – 3 receptions, 77 yards

==== Week 11: vs. Pittsburgh Steelers ====
Week Eleven: Pittsburgh Steelers at Jacksonville Jaguars – Game summary

Quarter	1	2	3	4	Total
**Steelers**	0	0	6	14	**20**
Jaguars	0	9	7	0	**16**

at TIAA Bank Field, Jacksonville, Florida

- Date: November 18
- Game time: 1:00 p.m. EST
- Game weather: Mostly sunny skies, 73 °F (23 °C)
- Game attendance: 67,683
- Referee: Walt Anderson
- TV announcers (CBS): Jim Nantz, Tony Romo and Tracy Wolfson
- Recap, Game Book

Game information

**First quarter**

- No scoring plays.

**Second quarter**

- JAX – Josh Lambo 48-yard field goal, 13:10. Jaguars 3–0. **Drive: 15 plays, 69 yards, 8:57.**
- JAX – Josh Lambo 38-yard field goal, 8:34. Jaguars 6–0. **Drive: 6 plays, 38 yards, 3:28.**
- JAX – Josh Lambo 43-yard field goal, 3:37. Jaguars 9–0. **Drive: 9 plays, 37 yards, 4:46.**

**Third quarter**

- JAX – Leonard Fournette 2-yard run (Josh Lambo kick), 1:35. Jaguars 16–0. **Drive: 10 plays, 80 yards, 5:50.**
- PIT – Antonio Brown 78-yard pass from Ben Roethlisberger (pass failed), 1:17. Jaguars 16–6. **Drive: 2 plays, 84 yards, 0:52.**

**Fourth quarter**

- PIT – Vance McDonald 11-yard pass from Ben Roethlisberger (Chris Boswell kick), 2:28. Jaguars 16–13. **Drive: 8 plays, 80 yards, 2:38.**
- PIT – Ben Roethlisberger 1-yard run (Chris Boswell kick), 0:05. Steelers 20–16. **Drive: 7 plays, 67 yards, 1:39.**

**Top passers**

- PIT – Ben Roethlisberger – 27/47, 314 yards, 2 TD, 3 INT
- JAX – Blake Bortles – 10/18, 104 yards

**Top rushers**

- PIT – James Conner – 9 carries, 25 yards
- JAX – Leonard Fournette – 28 carries, 95 yards, 1 TD

**Top receivers**

- PIT – Antonio Brown – 5 receptions, 117 yards, 1 TD
- JAX – Leonard Fournette – 2 receptions, 46 yards

==== Week 12: at Buffalo Bills ====
Week Twelve: Jacksonville Jaguars at Buffalo Bills – Game summary

Quarter	1	2	3	4	Total
Jaguars	0	14	0	7	**21**
**Bills**	14	0	0	10	**24**

at New Era Field, Orchard Park, New York

- Date: November 25
- Game time: 1:00 p.m. EST
- Game weather: Cloudy, 44 °F (7 °C)
- Game attendance: 57,799
- Referee: Walt Coleman
- TV announcers (CBS): Spero Dedes and Adam Archuleta
- Recap, Game Book

Game information

**First quarter**

- BUF – Isaiah McKenzie 6-yard run (Steven Hauschka kick), 5:02. Bills 7–0. **Drive: 5 plays, 75 yards, 2:23.**
- BUF – Robert Foster 75-yard pass from Josh Allen (Steven Hauschka kick), 2:39. Bills 14–0. **Drive: 3 plays, 86 yards, 1:19.**

**Second quarter**

- JAX – Leonard Fournette 5-yard run (Josh Lambo kick), 10:58. Bills 14–7. **Drive: 11 plays, 74 yards, 6:41.**
- JAX – Leonard Fournette 1-yard run (Josh Lambo kick), 5:30. Tied 14–14. **Drive: 6 plays, 74 yards, 3:18.**

**Third quarter**

- No scoring plays.

**Fourth quarter**

- BUF – Josh Allen 14-yard run (Steven Hauschka kick), 14:52. Bills 21–14. **Drive: 3 plays, 68 yards, 0:43.**
- BUF – Steven Hauschka 22-yard field goal, 3:06. Bills 24–14. **Drive: 6 plays, 14 yards, 1:55.**
- JAX – Dede Westbrook 13-yard pass from Blake Bortles (Josh Lambo kick), 1:20. Bills 24–21. **Drive: 8 plays, 70 yards, 1:46.**

**Top passers**

- JAX – Blake Bortles – 12/23, 127 yards, TD, 2 INT
- BUF – Josh Allen – 8/19, 160 yards, TD

**Top rushers**

- JAX – Leonard Fournette – 18 rushes, 95 yards, 2 TD
- BUF – Josh Allen – 13 rushes, 99 yards, TD

**Top receivers**

- JAX – Dede Westbrook – 3 receptions, 44 yards, TD
- BUF – Robert Foster – 2 receptions, 94 yards, TD

==== Week 13: vs. Indianapolis Colts ====
Week Thirteen: Indianapolis Colts at Jacksonville Jaguars – Game summary

Quarter	1	2	3	4	Total
Colts	0	0	0	0	**0**
**Jaguars**	0	3	0	3	**6**

at TIAA Bank Field, Jacksonville, Florida

- Date: December 2
- Game time: 1:00 p.m. EST
- Game weather: Cloudy, 78 °F (26 °C)
- Game attendance: 67,030
- Referee: Alex Kemp
- TV announcers (CBS): Tom McCarthy and Steve Beuerlein
- Recap, Game Book

Game information

**First quarter**

- No scoring plays.

**Second quarter**

- JAX – Josh Lambo 30-yard field goal, 2:03. Jaguars 3–0. **Drive: 13 plays, 43 yards, 6:49.**

**Third quarter**

- No scoring plays.

**Fourth quarter**

- JAX – Josh Lambo 37-yard field goal, 11:42. Jaguars 6–0. **Drive: 10 plays, 49 yards, 5:48.**

**Top passers**

- IND – Andrew Luck – 33/52, 248 yards, INT
- JAX – Cody Kessler – 18/24, 150 yards

**Top rushers**

- IND – Marlon Mack – 8 rushes, 27 yards
- JAX – Carlos Hyde – 13 rushes, 36 yards

**Top receivers**

- IND – Eric Ebron – 10 receptions, 81 yards
- JAX – T.J. Yeldon – 7 receptions, 49 yards

==== Week 14: at Tennessee Titans ====
Week Fourteen: Jacksonville Jaguars at Tennessee Titans – Game summary

Quarter	1	2	3	4	Total
Jaguars	2	0	7	0	**9**
**Titans**	7	9	14	0	**30**

at Nissan Stadium, Nashville, Tennessee

- Date: December 6
- Game time: 8:20 p.m. EST/7:20 p.m. CST
- Game weather: Clear, 44 °F (7 °C)
- Game attendance: 60,344
- Referee: John Parry
- TV announcers (Fox/NFLN): Joe Buck, Troy Aikman, Erin Andrews and Kristina Pink
- Recap, Game Book

Game information

**First quarter**

- TEN – Derrick Henry 3-yard rush (Ryan Succop kick), 9:30. Titans 7–0. **Drive: 10 plays, 73 yards, 5:30.**
- JAX – Cameron Batson tackled by Leon Jacobs in end zone for safety, 0:45. Titans 7–2.

**Second quarter**

- TEN – Derrick Henry 99-yard rush (kick failed), 7:07. Titans 13–2. **Drive: 1 plays, 99 yards, 0:18.**
- TEN – Ryan Succop 33-yard field goal, 0:05. Titans 16–2. **Drive: 8 plays, 25 yards, 1:12.**

**Third quarter**

- TEN – Derrick Henry 16-yard rush (Ryan Succop kick), 7:19. Titans 23–2. **Drive: 10 plays, 78 yards, 5:36.**
- TEN – Derrick Henry 54-yard rush (Ryan Succop kick), 5:30. Titans 30–2. **Drive: 1 plays, 54 yards, 0:11.**
- JAX – Dede Westbrook 7-yard pass from Cody Kessler (Josh Lambo kick), 1:49. Titans 30–9. **Drive: 11 plays, 67 yards, 3:41.**

**Fourth quarter**

- No scoring plays.

**Top passers**

- JAX – Cody Kessler – 25/43, 240 yards, TD
- TEN – Marcus Mariota – 18/24, 162 yards, INT

**Top rushers**

- JAX – Leonard Fournette – 14 carries, 36 yards
- TEN – Derrick Henry – 17 carries, 238 yards, 4 TD

**Top receivers**

- JAX – Dede Westbrook – 7 receptions, 88 yards, TD
- TEN – Taywan Taylor – 6 receptions, 59 yards

==== Week 15: vs. Washington Redskins ====
Week Fifteen: Washington Redskins at Jacksonville Jaguars – Game summary

Quarter	1	2	3	4	Total
**Redskins**	3	0	3	10	**16**
Jaguars	0	10	0	3	**13**

at TIAA Bank Field, Jacksonville, Florida

- Date: December 16
- Game time: 1:00 p.m. EST
- Game weather: Partly cloudy, 64 °F (18 °C)
- Game attendance: 67,577
- Referee: Clete Blakeman
- TV announcers (CBS): Kevin Harlan, Rich Gannon and Steve Tasker
- Recap, Game Book

Game information

**First quarter**

- WAS – Dustin Hopkins 46-yard field goal, 1:50. Redskins 3–0. **Drive: 9 plays, 28 yards, 5:02.**

**Second quarter**

- JAX – Kai Forbath 33-yard field goal, 3:22. Tied 3–3. **Drive: 10 plays, 31 yards, 5:20.**
- JAX – Dede Westbrook 74-yard punt return (Kai Forbath kick), 0:04. Jaguars 10–3.

**Third quarter**

- WAS – Dustin Hopkins 33-yard field goal, 7:32. Jaguars 10–6. **Drive: 16 plays, 60 yards, 7:28.**

**Fourth quarter**

- JAX – Kai Forbath 41-yard field goal, 11:16. Jaguars 13–6. **Drive: 9 plays, 65 yards, 5:28.**
- WAS – Jeremy Sprinkle 6-yard pass from Josh Johnson (Dustin Hopkins kick), 5:47. Tied 13–13. **Drive: 10 plays, 68 yards, 5:29.**
- WAS – Dustin Hopkins 36-yard field goal, 0:00. Redskins 16–13. **Drive: 8 plays, 36 yards, 2:31.**

**Top passers**

- WAS – Josh Johnson – 16/25, 151 yards, TD
- JAX – Cody Kessler – 9/17, 57 yards, INT

**Top rushers**

- WAS – Adrian Peterson – 19 carries, 51 yards
- JAX – Cody Kessler – 6 carries, 68 yards

**Top receivers**

- WAS – Jamison Crowder – 4 receptions, 46 yards
- JAX – Dede Westbrook – 3 receptions, 21 yards

==== Week 16: at Miami Dolphins ====
Week Sixteen: Jacksonville Jaguars at Miami Dolphins – Game summary

Quarter	1	2	3	4	Total
**Jaguars**	7	0	0	10	**17**
Dolphins	7	0	0	0	**7**

at Hard Rock Stadium, Miami Gardens, Florida

- Date: December 23
- Game time: 1:00 p.m. EST
- Game weather: Sunny, 73 °F (23 °C)
- Game attendance: 65,798
- Referee: Clay Martin
- TV announcers (CBS): Andrew Catalon and James Lofton
- Recap, Game Book

Game information

**First quarter**

- MIA – Brandon Bolden 4-yard pass from Ryan Tannehill (Jason Sanders kick), 9:49. Dolphins 7–0. **Drive: 8 plays, 78 yards, 5:11.**
- JAX – Leonard Fournette 1-yard run (Kai Forbath kick), 2:29. Tied 7–7. **Drive: 13 plays, 75 yards, 7:20.**

**Second quarter**

- No scoring plays.

**Third quarter**

- No scoring plays.

**Fourth quarter**

- JAX – Kai Forbath 26-yard field goal, 10:54. Jaguars 10–7. **Drive: 10 plays, 51 yards, 4:46.**
- JAX – Telvin Smith 33-yard interception return (Kai Forbath kick), 9:34. Jaguars 17–7.

**Top passers**

- JAX – Cody Kessler – 12/17, 106 yards
- MIA – Ryan Tannehill – 15/22, 146 yards, TD, INT

**Top rushers**

- JAX – Carlos Hyde – 8 carries, 47 yards
- MIA – Kenyan Drake – 6 carries, 23 yards

**Top receivers**

- JAX – Dede Westbrook – 7 receptions, 45 yards
- MIA – Kenyan Drake – 4 receptions, 31 yards

==== Week 17: at Houston Texans ====
Week Seventeen: Jacksonville Jaguars at Houston Texans – Game summary

Quarter	1	2	3	4	Total
Jaguars	3	0	0	0	**3**
**Texans**	3	14	0	3	**20**

at NRG Stadium, Houston, Texas

- Date: December 30
- Game time: 1:00 p.m. EST/12:00 p.m. CST
- Game weather: Played indoors (retractable roof closed)
- Game attendance: 71,848
- Referee: Pete Morelli
- TV announcers (CBS): Andrew Catalon, James Lofton and Jay Feely
- Recap, Game Book

Game information

**First quarter**

- JAX – Kai Forbath 25-yard field goal, 10:08. Jaguars 3–0. **Drive: 4 plays, 3 yards, 2:00.**
- HOU – Kaʻimi Fairbairn 23-yard field goal, 5:20. Tied 3–3. **Drive: 10 plays, 69 yards, 4:48.**

**Second quarter**

- HOU – Deshaun Watson 5-yard run (Kaʻimi Fairbairn kick), 14:56. Texans 10–3. **Drive: 4 plays, 51 yards, 1:37.**
- HOU – Lamar Miller 7-yard run (Kaʻimi Fairbairn kick), 3:01. Texans 17–3. **Drive: 9 plays, 63 yards, 4:27.**

**Third quarter**

- No scoring plays.

**Fourth quarter**

- HOU – Kaʻimi Fairbairn 24-yard field goal, 10:52. Texans 20–3. **Drive: 9 plays, 60 yards, 3:29.**

**Top passers**

- JAX – Blake Bortles – 15/28, 105 yards, INT
- HOU – Deshaun Watson – 25/35, 234 yards

**Top rushers**

- JAX – Blake Bortles – 4 carries, 15 yards
- HOU – DeShaun Watson – 13 carries, 66 yards, TD

**Top receivers**

- JAX – Keelan Cole – 4 receptions, 45 yards
- HOU – DeAndre Hopkins – 12 receptions, 147 yards

=== Standings ===
==== Division ====
AFC South
	W	L	T	PCT	DIV	CONF	PF	PA	STK
^{(3)} Houston Texans	11	5	0	.688	4–2	9–3	402	316	W1
^{(6)} Indianapolis Colts	10	6	0	.625	4–2	7–5	433	344	W4
Tennessee Titans	9	7	0	.563	3–3	5–7	310	303	L1
Jacksonville Jaguars	5	11	0	.313	1–5	4–8	245	316	L1

==== Conference ====
AFC
#	Team	Division	W	L	T	PCT	DIV	CONF	SOS	SOV	STK
**Division leaders**
1 (Note: Kansas City finished ahead of LA Chargers in the AFC West based on division record, claiming the No. 1 seed.)	Kansas City Chiefs	West	12	4	0	.750	5–1	10–2	.480	.401	W1
2 (Note: New England claimed the No. 2 seed over Houston based on head-to-head victory.)	New England Patriots	East	11	5	0	.688	5–1	8–4	.482	.494	W2
3	Houston Texans	South	11	5	0	.688	4–2	9–3	.471	.435	W1
4	Baltimore Ravens	North	10	6	0	.625	3–3	8–4	.496	.450	W3
**Wild Cards**
5	Los Angeles Chargers	West	12	4	0	.750	4–2	9–3	.477	.422	W1
6	Indianapolis Colts	South	10	6	0	.625	4–2	7–5	.465	.456	W4
**Did not qualify for the postseason**
7	Pittsburgh Steelers	North	9	6	1	.594	4–1–1	6–5–1	.504	.448	W1
8	Tennessee Titans	South	9	7	0	.563	3–3	5–7	.520	.465	L1
9	Cleveland Browns	North	7	8	1	.469	3–2–1	5–6–1	.516	.411	L1
10	Miami Dolphins	East	7	9	0	.438	4–2	6–6	.469	.446	L3
11 (Note: Denver finished ahead of Cincinnati and Buffalo based on strength of victory. Cincinnati finished ahead of Buffalo based on record vs. common opponents. Cincinnati's cumulative record against Baltimore, Indianapolis, the Los Angeles Chargers and Miami was 3–2, compared to Buffalo's 1–4 cumulative record against the same four teams.)	Denver Broncos	West	6	10	0	.375	2–4	4–8	.523	.464	L4
12	Cincinnati Bengals	North	6	10	0	.375	1–5	4–8	.535	.448	L2
13	Buffalo Bills	East	6	10	0	.375	2–4	4–8	.523	.411	W1
14	Jacksonville Jaguars	South	5	11	0	.313	1–5	4–8	.549	.463	L1
15 (Note: NY Jets finished ahead of Oakland based on strength of victory.)	New York Jets	East	4	12	0	.250	1–5	3–9	.506	.438	L3
16	Oakland Raiders	West	4	12	0	.250	1–5	3–9	.547	.406	L1
**Tiebreakers** (Note: When breaking ties for three or more teams under the NFL's rules, they are first broken within divisions, then comparing only the highest ranked remaining team from each division.)
