= Robert Foster (American football) =

American football player (born 1994)

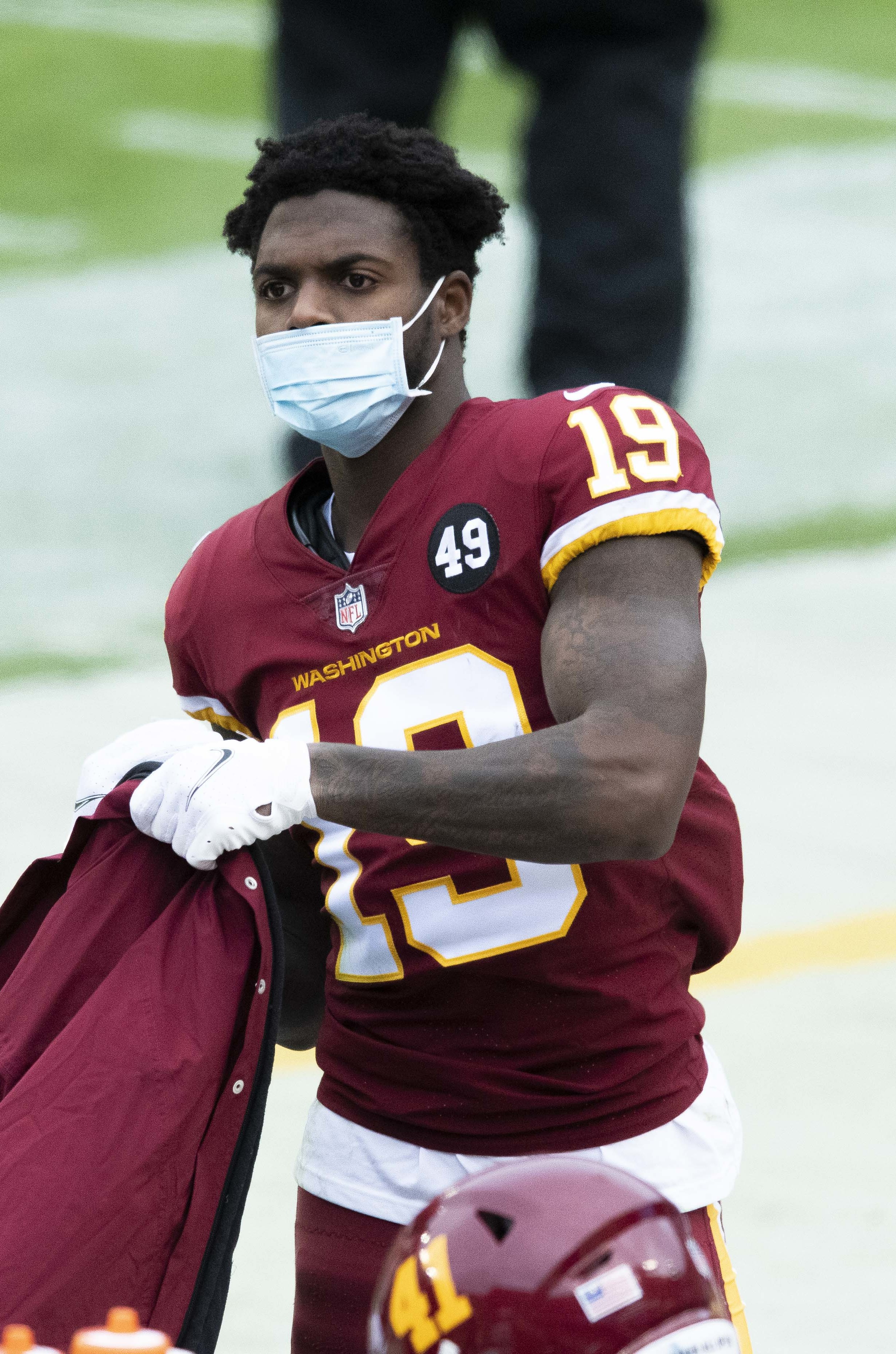
- Foster with the Washington Football Team in 2020

No. 16, 19
- Position: Wide receiver

Personal information
- Born: May 7, 1994 (age 32); Monaca, Pennsylvania, U.S.
- Listed height: 6 ft 2 in (1.88 m)
- Listed weight: 194 lb (88 kg)

Career information
- High school: Central Valley (Monaca)
- College: Alabama (2013–2017)
- NFL draft: 2018: undrafted

Career history
- Buffalo Bills (2018–2019); Green Bay Packers (2020)*; Washington Football Team (2020); Miami Dolphins (2021)*; Dallas Cowboys (2021)*; New York Giants (2022)*; Indianapolis Colts (2022)*
- * Offseason or practice squad member only

Awards and highlights
- 2× CFP national champion (2015, 2017)

Career NFL statistics
- Receptions: 32
- Receiving yards: 642
- Receiving touchdowns: 3
- Stats at Pro Football Reference

Robert Foster Jr. (born May 7, 1994) is an American former professional football player who was a wide receiver in the National Football League (NFL). He played college football for the Alabama Crimson Tide and signed with the Buffalo Bills as an undrafted free agent in 2018. He was also a member of the Green Bay Packers, Washington Football Team, Miami Dolphins, Dallas Cowboys, New York Giants, and Indianapolis Colts.

== Early life ==
Foster attended Central Valley High School in Monaca, Pennsylvania, just outside Pittsburgh, where he played both football and basketball. While on the way to a football camp, he survived a shooting in which one of his teammates was killed. Coming out of high school, Foster was the nation's No. 2 receiver ranked 23rd overall in the 2013 class. A 4-star recruit, Foster committed to Alabama over offers from Florida, Michigan, Ohio State, and Pittsburgh, among others.

== College career ==
During his redshirt sophomore season in 2015, Foster suffered a season-ending shoulder injury after catching 10 receptions 116 yards and two touchdowns in the first three games. He was limited in 2016 and considered transferring before deciding to stay with Alabama.

In 2017, he caught 14 passes for 174 yards and one touchdown. Overall, he caught 35 passes for 389 yards and three scores during his career at Alabama.

== Professional career ==
=== Pre-draft ===
Pre-draft measurables
Height	Weight	Arm length	Hand span	40-yard dash	10-yard split	20-yard split	20-yard shuttle	Three-cone drill	Vertical jump	Broad jump
6 ft 1 5/8 in (1.87 m)	196 lb (89 kg)	32 1/8 in (0.82 m)	9 1/4 in (0.23 m)	4.41 s	1.58 s	2.62 s	4.20 s	6.90 s	33.5 in (0.85 m)	9 ft 8 in (2.95 m)
All values from NFL Combine/Pro Day

Despite limited college statistics, Foster was invited to the 2018 NFL Scouting Combine due to his athleticism. He clocked a 4.41-second 40-yard dash, fifth overall among receivers.

=== Buffalo Bills ===
==== 2018 ====
Foster signed with the Buffalo Bills as an undrafted free agent on May 11, 2018, reuniting with Brian Daboll, his one-time offensive coordinator at Alabama. In Week 2, against the Los Angeles Chargers, he recorded his first two professional receptions, which went for 30 yards. Foster was waived by Buffalo on October 18, and was re-signed to the practice squad. He was promoted to the active roster on November 10.

Foster recorded his first 100-yard receiving game against the New York Jets on November 11, finishing with 105 yards on three receptions. Against the Jacksonville Jaguars two weeks later following the Bills' bye week, he recorded his first receiving touchdown, a 75-yard pass from Josh Allen. Foster finished that game with two receptions for 94 yards and the touchdown. In Week 13 against the Miami Dolphins, he only caught one pass for 27 yards. In the team's next game against the New York Jets on December 9, Foster recorded a career-high seven catches on eight targets for 104 yards. Against the Detroit Lions the week after that, Foster excelled again, catching four passes for 108 yards, including a 42-yard touchdown from Allen, en route to a 14–13 Bills win. In the season finale, Foster caught four passes for 21 yards and a touchdown in a 42–17 win over Miami.

Foster mentioned being cut from the team, demoted to the practice squad, and being brought back again as a "wake-up call" that sparked his late-season success. He finished his rookie season with 27 receptions for 541 yards and three touchdowns while averaging 20 yards per reception and was named by Pro Football Focus to its all-rookie team as an offensive flex player.

==== 2019 ====
Foster was sparsely used in the Bills offense during his second professional season, as the team added veterans John Brown and Cole Beasley during the offseason. He also struggled with injuries during preseason. Foster caught just three of 18 targets for 64 yards, and was made inactive during the Bills' playoff game against the Houston Texans in favor of Duke Williams. He also rushed twice for 29 yards.

==== 2020 ====
Foster was re-signed to a one-year contract by the Bills. He was waived as part of final roster cuts on September 5, 2020.

=== Green Bay Packers ===
On September 9, 2020, Foster was signed to the Green Bay Packers' practice squad.

=== Washington Football Team ===
On October 22, 2020, Foster was signed off the Packers' practice squad by the Washington Football Team.

=== Miami Dolphins ===
On March 18, 2021, Foster was signed by the Dolphins. He was waived/injured on August 24, and placed on injured reserve. Foster was released by Miami on August 30.

=== Dallas Cowboys ===
On September 14, 2021, Foster was signed to the Dallas Cowboys' practice squad. He signed a reserve/future contract with the Cowboys on January 18, 2022. Foster was waived by Dallas on March 11.

=== New York Giants ===
On March 14, 2022, Foster was signed by the New York Giants. On August 19, Foster was placed on injured reserve with a hamstring injury. He was released by the team on August 25. On October 10, Foster was re-signed to the Giants' practice squad. He was released by New York again on November 29.

=== Indianapolis Colts ===
On December 13, 2022, the Indianapolis Colts signed Foster to their practice squad. He was released by Indianapolis two days later on December 15.

== NFL career statistics ==
=== Regular season ===
Robert Foster
Year	Team	GP	GS	Rec	Yards	YPR	TDs	LNG
2018	BUF	13	3	27	541	20.0	3	75
2019	BUF	13	2	3	64	21.3	0	24
2020	WSH	4	2	2	37	19.5	0	28
Career		30	7	32	642	20.0	3	75
