= Cameron Batson =

American football player (born 1995)

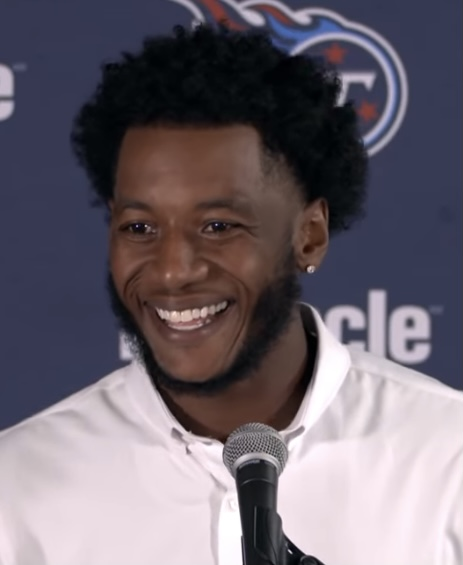
- Batson in 2021

Profile
- Position: Wide receiver

Personal information
- Born: December 20, 1995 (age 30); Oklahoma City, Oklahoma, U.S.
- Listed height: 5 ft 8 in (1.73 m)
- Listed weight: 175 lb (79 kg)

Career information
- High school: Millwood (Oklahoma City)
- College: Texas Tech (2014–2017)
- NFL draft: 2018: undrafted

Career history
- Tennessee Titans (2018–2021); Atlanta Falcons (2022)*; Hamilton Tiger-Cats (2024)*
- * Offseason or practice squad member only

Career NFL statistics
- Receptions: 22
- Receiving yards: 197
- Receiving touchdowns: 2
- Rushing yards: 36
- Return yards: 315
- Stats at Pro Football Reference

Cameron Malik Batson (born December 20, 1995) is an American professional football wide receiver and return specialist. He played college football at Texas Tech and was signed as an undrafted free agent by the Tennessee Titans in 2018.

== Early life ==
Batson was born on December 20, 1995, to Willie Batson III and Erika Batson in Oklahoma City. He grew up there with his twin sisters, Caira and Carmen, and attended Millwood High School, where he played quarterback on the football team. As a senior, Batson threw for more than 2,000 yards and rushed for more than 1,000 yards and was named the Oklahoma Gatorade Player of the Year for football and was a first-team All-State selection. Additionally, Batson was the valedictorian of his class at Millwood.

== College career ==
Over the course of four seasons with the Red Raiders, Batson caught 157 passes for 1,499 yards and 14 touchdowns in 50 games played. As a senior, Batson was named honorable mention All-Big 12 after catching 59 receptions passes for 487 yards and five touchdowns, along with 14 kicks returned 308 yards and 17 punts for 91 yards. He was a 3-time All-Big 12 Academic Team Selection and graduated with a degree in accounting.

== Professional career ==
=== Tennessee Titans ===
Batson signed with the Tennessee Titans as an undrafted free agent on May 11, 2018. He initially made the 53-man roster out of training camp, but was waived by the team on September 17 after being inactive for the first two games of the season. Batson was subsequently re-signed to the Titan's practice squad the next day. Batson was promoted from the practice squad to the Titan's active roster on October 10, 2018. He made his NFL debut on October 14 in a 21–0 loss to the Baltimore Ravens, returning one punt for no gain. He recorded his first career reception, catching a pass from Marcus Mariota for no gain, against the Los Angeles Chargers in a Week 7 loss. On December 6, 2018, in a 30–9 Week 14 victory over the Jacksonville Jaguars, Batson muffed a punt return and was tackled in the end zone for a safety. In his rookie season, Batson appeared in 11 games (two starts) and caught eight passes for 82 yards, with one rushing attempt for one yard and three punts returned for four yards.

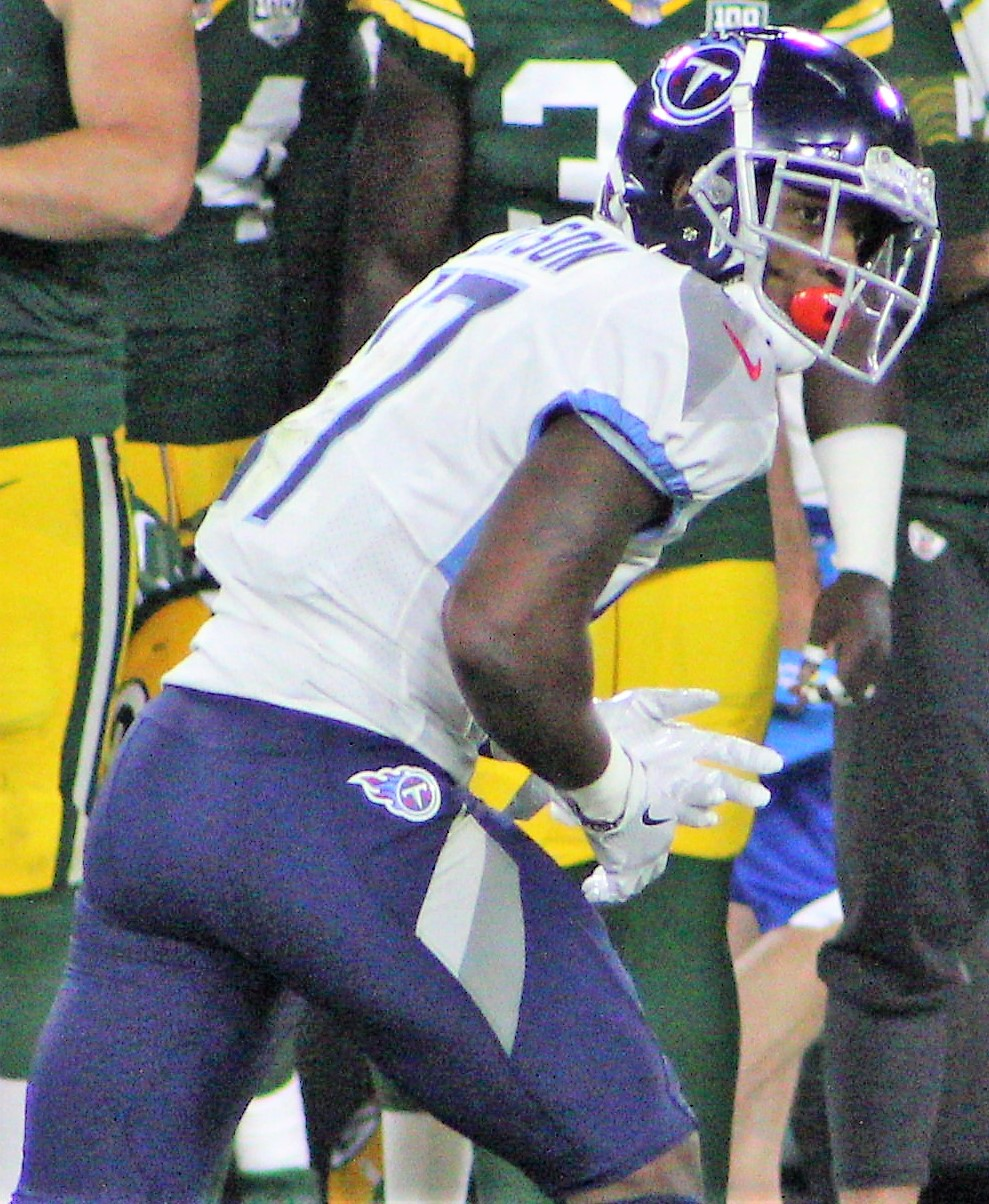
Batson in 2018

On July 31, 2019, Batson was placed on injured reserve with a shoulder injury, prematurely ending his season.

On February 19, 2020, Batson signed a one-year contract extension with the Titans. Batson was waived by the Titans on September 7, 2020, and re-signed to the practice squad two days later. He was elevated to the active roster on September 19 for the team's week 2 game against the Jacksonville Jaguars, and reverted to the practice squad after the game. He was elevated again on September 26 for the week 3 game against the Minnesota Vikings, and reverted to the practice squad again following the game. He was placed on the practice squad/COVID-19 list by the team on October 2, 2020, and was activated back to the practice squad on October 14. He was elevated to the active roster again for the week 6 game against the Houston Texans, and reverted to the practice squad after the game. He was signed to the active roster on November 7.

During Week 13 against the Cleveland Browns, Batson recorded three catches for 14 yards, including his first NFL touchdown, during the 41–35 loss.

On October 19, 2021, Batson was placed on injured reserve after suffering a torn ACL in Week 6.

=== Atlanta Falcons ===
On June 2, 2022, the Atlanta Falcons signed Batson, reuniting him with head coach Arthur Smith. He was released on August 30 and re-signed to the practice squad. He was released from the practice squad on January 2, 2023, after facing five criminal charges.

=== Hamilton Tiger-Cats ===
Batson signed with the Hamilton Tiger-Cats of the CFL on January 18, 2024. He was placed on the reserve/suspended list on May 12, 2024.

== NFL statistics ==
=== Regular season ===
Season	Team	Games		Receiving					Rushing					Returning					Fumbles	
Season	Team	GP	GS	Rec	Yds	Avg	Lng	TD	Att	Yds	Avg	Lng	TD	Ret	Yds	Avg	Lng	TD	FUM	Lost
2018	TEN	11	2	8	82	10.3	26	0	1	1	1.0	1	0	3	4	1.3	5	0	1	0
2019	TEN	0	0	Did not play due to injury																
2020	TEN	12	1	12	100	8.3	18	1	4	20	5.0	11	0	11	231	21.0	35	0	1	0
2021	TEN	4	0	2	15	7.5	13	1	2	15	7.5	11	0	5	80	16.0	20	0	0	0
Career		27	3	22	197	9.0	26	2	7	36	5.1	11	0	19	315	19.4	35	0	2	0

=== Postseason ===
Season	Team	Games		Receiving					Rushing					Returning					Fumbles	
Season	Team	GP	GS	Rec	Yds	Avg	Lng	TD	Att	Yds	Avg	Lng	TD	Ret	Yds	Avg	Lng	TD	FUM	Lost
2020	TEN	1	0	1	6	6.0	6	0	0	0	0.0	0	0	0	0	0.0	0	0	0	0
Career		1	0	1	6	6.0	6	0	0	0	0.0	0	0	0	0	0.0	0	0	0	0

== Personal life ==
Batson's father, Willie Batson III, played college baseball at Alabama A&M University. His cousin, Tramain Swindall, also played wide receiver at Texas Tech and had 150 career receptions for the Red Raiders.

== Legal troubles ==
On December 31, 2022, Batson was arrested in Atlanta following a chaotic series of events. During a routine traffic stop officers noticed Batson appeared intoxicated and attempted to apprehend him. Batson became aggressive with officers and an officer fired one shot while Batson fled in his truck which he eventually crashed. Officers canvassed the area and were able to locate Batson. Batson was charged with battery, aggravated assault, aggravated assault of a law enforcement officer when engaged on official duty, driving-fleeing to elude an officer, and removal or attempted removal of a weapon from a public official.
