= 2018 Tennessee Titans season =

59th season in franchise history

- Owner: Amy Adams Strunk
- General manager: Jon Robinson
- Head coach: Mike Vrabel
- Home stadium: Nissan Stadium

Results
- Record: 9–7
- Division place: 3rd AFC South
- Playoffs: Did not qualify
- Pro Bowlers: OT Taylor Lewan; DT Jurrell Casey; P Brett Kern

Uniform
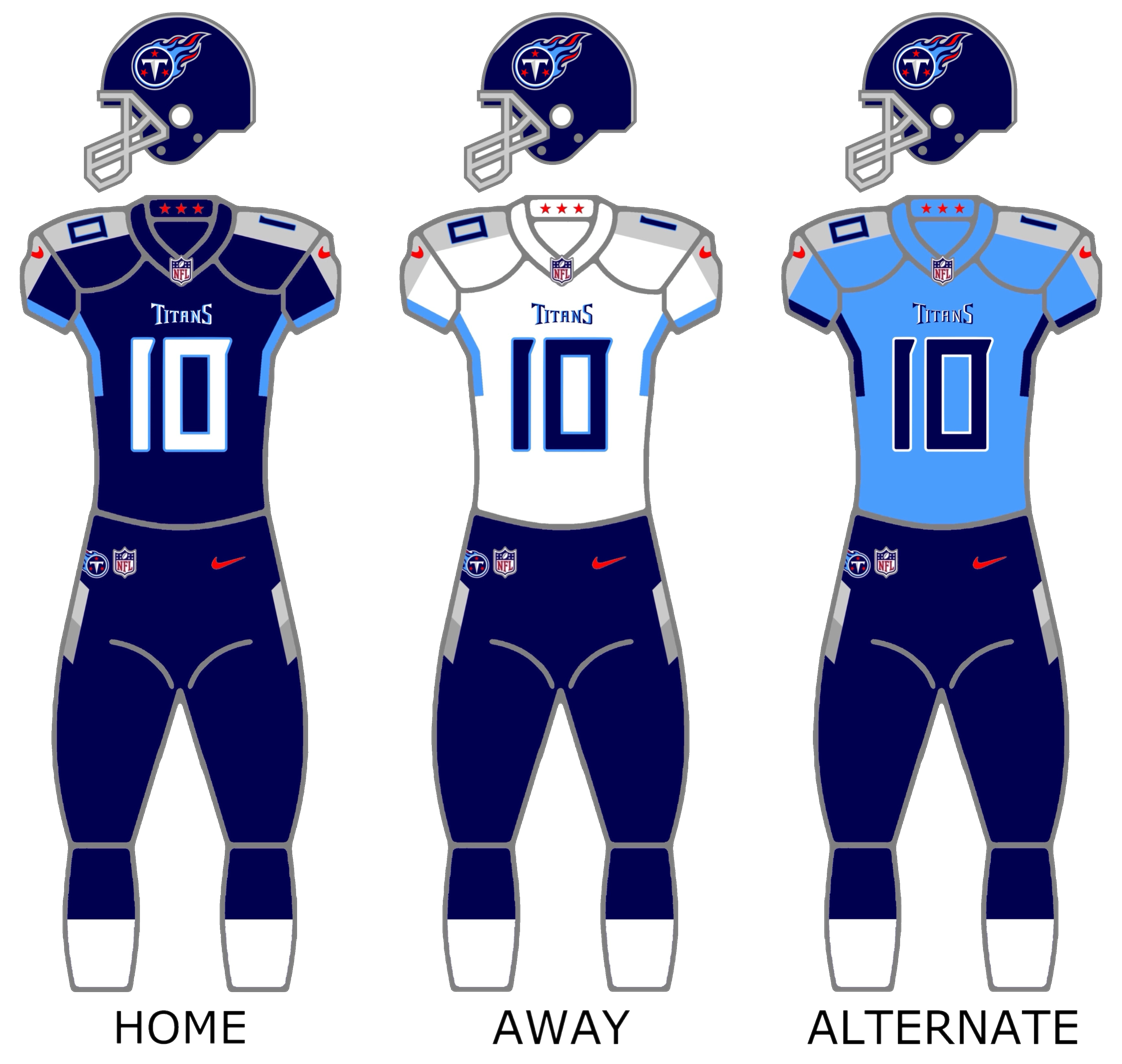

The 2018 season was the Tennessee Titans' 49th in the National Football League (NFL) and their 59th overall. It also marked the franchise's 22nd season in the state of Tennessee, their first under head coach Mike Vrabel, and the first with new uniforms and blue helmets, as they have worn white helmets since the club was based in Houston, Texas. This season marked the third of four straight in which the Titans finished 9–7. The Titans failed to qualify for the postseason after losing a Week 17 win-and-in contest against their division rival Indianapolis Colts.

In Vrabel's first year with the team, the Titans went 3–3 against divisional opponents, sweeping the Jacksonville Jaguars for the second straight year. The Titans also beat the New England Patriots for the first time since 2002. Quarterback Marcus Mariota had a difficult season, going 7–6 as a starter, throwing 11 touchdowns to eight interceptions, and missing three games due to injury. Backup quarterback Blaine Gabbert started three games, including the season finale against the Colts in which the Titans were eliminated from the playoffs.

One major highlight was the breakout season of running back Derrick Henry, who rushed for 1,059 yards and 12 touchdowns. This would be the first of Henry's three-straight 1,000-yard seasons. In a 30–9 Week 14 Thursday Night win over the Jaguars, Henry would rush for 238 yards (franchise record) and four touchdowns (tied-franchise record) on 17 carries, including an NFL-tying record 99-yard touchdown run.

== Coaching changes ==
In their second full season under head coach Mike Mularkey in 2017, the Titans reached the playoffs for the first time since 2008. The Titans won their first playoff game since 2003 in an 18-point halftime comeback wild card victory over the Kansas City Chiefs, winning 22–21. They were then soundly defeated by the New England Patriots 35–14 in the divisional round. The next day on January 15, 2018, the Titans and Mularkey agreed to part ways, ending his three-year tenure as head coach with a record of 20–21. Owner Amy Adams Strunk stated that Mularkey and the front office "saw different paths to achieve greater success," specifically with Mularkey not wanting to change any of his coaching staff. Five days later, the Titans named former Houston Texans defensive coordinator Mike Vrabel as the new head coach. Vrabel became the 19th head coach in franchise history. Two weeks later on January 30, the Titans announce the hiring of new offensive coordinator Matt LaFleur. LaFleur was with the Los Angeles Rams in 2017 and was credited for the development of Jared Goff and a Rams offense that led the league in points on route to an 11–5 record. On the same day, the Titans hired their new defensive coordinator Dean Pees. Pees had retired two weeks earlier with the Baltimore Ravens, citing his comeback with the Titans due to missing the game. Pees served as the Ravens defensive coordinator since their 2012 Super Bowl run, and his 2017 defense led the league in shutouts and takeaways. The next day, the Titans announced several additions to the coaching staff, including quarterback coach Pat O'Hara, secondary coach Kerry Coombs, outside linebackers coach Shane Bowen, inside linebackers coach Tyrone McKenzie, and wide receivers coach Rob Moore.

== Notable acquisitions ==
On March 15 the Titans signed two notable former New England Patriots players, running back Dion Lewis and cornerback Malcolm Butler. The two reunited with current cornerback Logan Ryan, who also played for the Patriots, in which their last season in New England together was capped off with a Super Bowl comeback win. Lewis was most known for his performance in the 2017 season, and Butler was most known for his game-winning interception in Super Bowl XLIX. The Titans signed their new back-up quarterback on March 26, seven-year veteran Blaine Gabbert, after releasing Matt Cassel earlier in the offseason. On August 4, the Titans signed safety Kenny Vaccaro following Johnathan Cyprien's season-ending ACL tear. On August 28, shortly before their final preseason game, the Titans traded their sixth round pick in the 2019 NFL draft to the Baltimore Ravens for outside linebacker Kamalei Correa.

== Draft ==
2018 Tennessee Titans Draft
Round	Selection	Player	Position	College
1	22	Rashaan Evans	ILB	Alabama
2	41	Harold Landry	OLB	Boston College
5	152	Dane Cruikshank	S	Arizona
6	199	Luke Falk	QB	Washington State

2018 Tennessee Titans Draft Trades
Draft Pick Year	Round	Overall	Team	Received
2018	1	25	to Baltimore Ravens	Received Baltimore's 2018 first-round selection (No. 22 overall) and 2018 sixth-round compensatory selection (No. 215 overall).
2018	4	125	to Baltimore Ravens	Received Baltimore's 2018 first-round selection (No. 22 overall) and 2018 sixth-round compensatory selection (No. 215 overall).
2018	2	57	to Oakland Raiders	Received Oakland's 2018 second-round selection (No. 41 overall).
2018	3	89	to Oakland Raiders	Received Oakland's 2018 second-round selection (No. 41 overall).
2018	5	162	to Baltimore Ravens	Received Baltimore's 2018 fifth-round selection (No. 152 overall).
2018	6	215	to Baltimore Ravens	Received Baltimore's 2018 fifth-round selection (No. 152 overall).
2018	7	243	to Kansas City Chiefs	Received defensive lineman David King.

=== Undrafted free agents ===
2018 Tennessee Titans Undrafted Free Agents
Name	Position	School
Austin Barnard	P/K	Samford
Cameron Batson	WR	Texas Tech
Deontay Burnett	WR	USC
Dalyn Dawkins	RB	Colorado State
Nick DeLuca	ILB	North Dakota State
Matthew Diaz	OT	Wagner
Matt Dickerson	DE	UCLA
Nico Falah	C	USC
Sharif Finch	OLB	Temple
Rico Gafford	CB	Wyoming
Elijaah Goins	CB	Ohio State
Joshua Kalu	CB	Nebraska
Ryan McKinley	CB	Montana
Elijah Nkansah	OT	Toledo
Mike Ramsay	DT	Duke
Larry Rose III	RB	New Mexico State
Devin Ross	WR	Colorado
Aaron Stinnie	OG	James Madison
Jordan Veasy	WR	California
Akrum Wadley	RB	Iowa
Damon Webb	S	Ohio State
Ethan Wolf	TE	Tennessee

Made regular season roster

== Staff ==
2018 Tennessee Titans staff
Front office: Owner – KSA Industries; Controlling owner – Amy Adams Strunk; President, chairman and CEO – Steve Underwood; Executive vice president and general manager – Jon Robinson; Vice president of football administration – Vin Marino; Vice president of player personnel – Ryan Cowden; Director of college scouting – Jon Salge; Director of pro scouting – Brian Gardner; Assistant director of pro scouting – Kevin Turks; Head coaches: Head coach – Mike Vrabel; Assistant to the head coach – John Streicher; Offensive coaches: Offensive coordinator – Matt LaFleur; Quarterbacks – Pat O'Hara; Running backs – Tony Dews; Wide receivers – Rob Moore; Tight ends – Arthur Smith; Offensive line – Keith Carter; Assistant offensive line – Mike Sullivan; Offensive assistant – Luke Steckel; Quality control – Chandler Henley	Defensive coaches: Defensive coordinator – Dean Pees; Defensive line – Terrell Williams; Outside linebackers – Shane Bowen; Inside linebackers – Tyrone McKenzie; Defensive backs − Kerry Coombs; Defensive assistant – Scott Booker; Defensive assistant – Ryan Crow; Quality control – Matt Pees; Special teams coaches: Special teams coordinator – Craig Aukerman; Assistant special teams – Matt Edwards; Strength and conditioning: Strength and conditioning – Tom Kanavu; Strength and conditioning assistant – Brian Bell; Strength and conditioning assistant – Taylor Porter

== Final roster ==
2018 Tennessee Titans roster
Quarterbacks (QB): 12 Austin Davis; 7 Blaine Gabbert; 8 Marcus Mariota; Running backs (RB): 22 Derrick Henry; 33 Dion Lewis; 30 Jeremy McNichols; Wide receivers (WR): 17 Cameron Batson; 84 Corey Davis; 15 Darius Jennings; 19 Tajae Sharpe; 13 Taywan Taylor; Tight ends (TE): 86 Anthony Firkser; 85 MyCole Pruitt; 88 Luke Stocker	Offensive linemen (OL): 60 Ben Jones C; 71 Dennis Kelly T; 64 Josh Kline G; 62 Corey Levin G; 77 Taylor Lewan T; 69 Tyler Marz T; 68 Austin Pasztor T; 67 Quinton Spain G; 61 Aaron Stinnie G; Defensive linemen (DL): 92 Matt Dickerson DE; 94 Austin Johnson NT; 90 DaQuan Jones DE; 97 Darius Kilgo DE; 96 Bennie Logan NT	Linebackers (LB): 53 Daren Bates ILB; 55 Jayon Brown ILB; 51 Will Compton ILB; 44 Kamalei Correa OLB; 54 Rashaan Evans ILB; 56 Sharif Finch OLB; 57 Nigel Harris ILB; 58 Harold Landry OLB; 45 LaTroy Lewis OLB; 91 Derrick Morgan OLB; 98 Brian Orakpo OLB; 59 Wesley Woodyard ILB; Defensive backs (DB): 21 Malcolm Butler CB; 31 Kevin Byard FS; 29 Dane Cruikshank SS; 20 Kenneth Durden CB; 25 Adoree' Jackson CB; 46 Joshua Kalu CB; 28 Kendrick Lewis SS; 36 LeShaun Sims CB; 41 Brynden Trawick FS; 24 Kenny Vaccaro SS; Special teams (ST): 48 Beau Brinkley LS; 6 Brett Kern P; 4 Ryan Succop K	Practice squad: 39 Dalyn Dawkins RB; 75 Jamil Douglas G; 38 Mike Jordan CB; 18 Roger Lewis WR; 40 Gimel President OLB; 76 David Quessenberry T; 14 Kalif Raymond WR; 83 Devin Ross WR; 93 Kendal Vickers DE; 35 Damon Webb SS; Reserve: 3 Austin Barnard P (IR); 99 Jurrell Casey DE (IR); 78 Jack Conklin T (IR); 37 Johnathan Cyprien SS (IR); 32 David Fluellen RB (IR); 50 Nate Palmer OLB (IR); 66 Kevin Pamphile G (IR); 26 Logan Ryan CB (IR); 81 Jonnu Smith TE (IR); 23 Tye Smith CB (IR); 82 Delanie Walker TE (IR); 89 Cole Wick TE (IR); Rookies in italics 53 active, 12 reserve, 10 practice squad

=== Team captains ===
- Marcus Mariota (QB)
- Delanie Walker (TE)
- Jurrell Casey (DE)
- Wesley Woodyard (LB)
- Daren Bates (ST)

== Preseason ==
Week	Date	Opponent	Result	Record	Venue	Recap
1	August 9	at Green Bay Packers	L 17–31	0–1	Lambeau Field	Recap
2	August 18	Tampa Bay Buccaneers	L 14–30	0–2	Nissan Stadium	Recap
3	August 25	at Pittsburgh Steelers	L 6–16	0–3	Heinz Field	Recap
4	August 30	Minnesota Vikings	L 3–13	0–4	Nissan Stadium	Recap

== Regular season ==
=== Schedule ===
On January 11, 2018, the NFL announced that the Titans would play the Los Angeles Chargers in one of three London Games at Wembley Stadium in London, England, with the Chargers serving as the home team. It was the Titans' first appearance in the International Series. The game occurred during Week 7 (October 21), and was televised by CBS in the United States. The exact date, along with the network and kickoff time, were announced in conjunction with the release of the 2018 regular season schedule.

Week	Date	Opponent	Result	Record	Venue	Recap
1	September 9	at Miami Dolphins	**L** 20–27	0–1	Hard Rock Stadium	Recap
2	September 16	**Houston Texans**	**W** 20–17	1–1	Nissan Stadium	Recap
3	September 23	at **Jacksonville Jaguars**	**W** 9–6	2–1	TIAA Bank Field	Recap
4	September 30	Philadelphia Eagles	**W** 26–23 (OT)	3–1	Nissan Stadium	Recap
5	October 7	at Buffalo Bills	**L** 12–13	3–2	New Era Field	Recap
6	October 14	Baltimore Ravens	**L** 0–21	3–3	Nissan Stadium	Recap
7	October 21	at Los Angeles Chargers	**L** 19–20	3–4	(United Kingdom) Wembley Stadium (London)	Recap
8	Bye					
9	November 5	at Dallas Cowboys	**W** 28–14	4–4	AT&T Stadium	Recap
10	November 11	New England Patriots	**W** 34–10	5–4	Nissan Stadium	Recap
11	November 18	at **Indianapolis Colts**	**L** 10–38	5–5	Lucas Oil Stadium	Recap
12	November 26	at **Houston Texans**	**L** 17–34	5–6	NRG Stadium	Recap
13	December 2	New York Jets	**W** 26–22	6–6	Nissan Stadium	Recap
14	December 6	**Jacksonville Jaguars**	**W** 30–9	7–6	Nissan Stadium	Recap
15	December 16	at New York Giants	**W** 17–0	8–6	MetLife Stadium	Recap
16	December 22	Washington Redskins	**W** 25–16	9–6	Nissan Stadium	Recap
17	December 30	**Indianapolis Colts**	**L** 17–33	9–7	Nissan Stadium	Recap

Note: Intra-division opponents are in bold text.

=== Game summaries ===
==== Week 1: at Miami Dolphins ====
Week One: Tennessee Titans at Miami Dolphins – Game summary

Quarter	1	2	3	4	Total
Titans	3	0	0	17	**20**
**Dolphins**	0	7	3	17	**27**

at Hard Rock Stadium, Miami Gardens, Florida

- Date: September 9
- Game time: 1:00 p.m. EDT/12:00 p.m. CDT
- Game weather: 89 °F (32 °C), Scattered Showers
- Game attendance: 65,184
- Referee: Jerome Boger
- TV announcers (Fox): Sam Rosen, Cris Carter and Sarah Kustok
- Recap, Gamebook

Game information

**First quarter**

- TEN – Ryan Succop 47-yard field goal, 10:18. Titans 3–0. **Drive: 9 plays, 37 yards, 4:42.**

**Second quarter**

- MIA – Kenny Stills 10-yard pass from Ryan Tannehill (Jason Sanders kick), 11:21. Dolphins 7–3. **Drive: 12 plays, 98 yards, 5:21.**

**Third quarter**

- MIA – Jason Sanders 27-yard field goal, 4:05. Dolphins 10–3. **Drive: 6 plays, 19 yards, 2:37.**

**Fourth quarter**

- TEN – Dion Lewis 4-yard run (Ryan Succop kick), 14:17. Tied 10–10. **Drive: 9 plays, 75 yards, 4:48.**
- MIA – Jakeem Grant 102-yard kick return (Jason Sanders kick), 14:04. Dolphins 17–10.
- MIA – Kenny Stills 75-yard pass from Ryan Tannehill (Jason Sanders kick), 10:22. Dolphins 24–10. **Drive: 4 plays, 89 yards, 1:17.**
- TEN – Darius Jennings 94-yard kick return (Ryan Succop kick), 10:11. Dolphins 24–17.
- MIA – Jason Sanders 30-yard field goal, 3:49. Dolphins 27–17. **Drive: 4 plays, 0 yards, 2:15.**
- TEN – Ryan Succop 53-yard field goal, 0:11. Dolphins 27–20. **Drive: 6 plays, 45 yards, 0:56.**

**Top passers**

- TEN – Blaine Gabbert – 11/22, 117 yards, INT
- MIA – Ryan Tannehill – 20/28, 230 yards, 2 TD, 2 INT

**Top rushers**

- TEN – Dion Lewis – 16 carries, 75 yards, TD
- MIA – Frank Gore – 9 carries, 61 yards

**Top receivers**

- TEN – Corey Davis – 6 receptions, 62 yards
- MIA – Kenny Stills – 4 receptions, 106 yards, 2 TD

Due to two weather delays, the game lasted for 7 hours and 10 minutes, the longest game since the AFL–NFL merger in 1970.

==== Week 2: vs. Houston Texans ====
Week Two: Houston Texans at Tennessee Titans – Game summary

Quarter	1	2	3	4	Total
Texans	0	7	3	7	**17**
**Titans**	14	0	0	6	**20**

at Nissan Stadium, Nashville, Tennessee

- Date: September 16
- Game time: 12:00 p.m. CDT
- Game weather: 81 °F (27 °C), cloudy
- Game attendance: 62,372
- Referee: Pete Morelli
- TV announcers (CBS): Andrew Catalon and James Lofton
- Recap, Gamebook

Game information

**First quarter**

- TEN – Dane Cruikshank 66-yard pass from Kevin Byard (Ryan Succop kick), 9:51. Titans 7–0. **Drive: 5 plays, 84 yards, 2:14.**
- TEN – Taywan Taylor 18-yard pass from Blaine Gabbert (Ryan Succop kick), 0:35. Titans 14–0. **Drive: 9 plays, 56 yards, 4:35.**

**Second quarter**

- HOU – DeAndre Hopkins 28-yard pass from Deshaun Watson (Kaʻimi Fairbairn kick), 0:58. Titans 14–7. **Drive: 6 plays, 53 yards, 2:30.**

**Third quarter**

- HOU – Kaʻimi Fairbairn 34-yard field goal, 2:44. Titans 14–10. **Drive: 9 plays, 36 yards, 4:00.**

**Fourth quarter**

- HOU – Will Fuller 39-yard pass from Deshaun Watson (Kaʻimi Fairbairn kick), 13:25. Texans 17–14. **Drive: 5 plays, 70 yards, 1:43.**
- TEN – Ryan Succop 42-yard field goal, 9:48. Tied 17–17. **Drive: 8 plays, 51 yards, 3:37.**
- TEN – Ryan Succop 31-yard field goal, 1:05. Titans 20–17. **Drive: 12 plays, 62 yards, 5:41.**

**Top passers**

- HOU – Deshaun Watson – 22/32, 310 yards, 2 TD, INT
- TEN – Blaine Gabbert – 13/20, 117 yards, TD

**Top rushers**

- HOU – Lamar Miller – 14 carries, 68 yards
- TEN – Derrick Henry – 18 carries, 56 yards

**Top receivers**

- HOU – Will Fuller – 8 receptions, 113 yards, TD
- TEN – Dane Cruikshank – 1 reception, 66 yards, TD

==== Week 3: at Jacksonville Jaguars ====
Week Three: Tennessee Titans at Jacksonville Jaguars – Game summary

Quarter	1	2	3	4	Total
**Titans**	3	0	3	3	**9**
Jaguars	0	3	0	3	**6**

at TIAA Bank Field, Jacksonville, Florida

- Date: September 23
- Game time: 1:00 p.m. EDT/12:00 p.m. CDT
- Game weather: 89 °F (32 °C), clear
- Game attendance: 64,015
- Referee: Shawn Smith
- TV announcers (CBS): Spero Dedes and Adam Archuleta
- Recap, Gamebook

Game information

**First quarter**

- TEN – Ryan Succop 39-yard field goal, 4:59. Titans 3–0. **Drive: 9 plays, 26 yards, 4:11.**

**Second quarter**

- JAX – Josh Lambo 46-yard field goal, 8:54. Tied 3–3. **Drive: 11 plays, 34 yards, 5:23.**

**Third quarter**

- TEN – Ryan Succop 36-yard field goal, 10:01. Titans 6–3. **Drive: 9 plays, 57 yards, 4:59.**

**Fourth quarter**

- JAX – Josh Lambo 38-yard field goal, 10:48. Tied 6–6. **Drive: 13 plays, 68 yards, 6:39.**
- TEN – Ryan Succop 28-yard field goal, 4:06. Titans 9–6. **Drive: 12 plays, 65 yards, 6:42.**

**Top passers**

- TEN – Marcus Mariota – 12/18, 100 yards
- JAX – Blake Bortles – 21/34, 155 yards

**Top rushers**

- TEN – Derrick Henry – 18 rushes, 57 yards
- JAX – T.J. Yeldon – 7 rushes, 44 yards

**Top receivers**

- TEN – Taywan Taylor – 4 receptions, 30 yards
- JAX – T.J. Yeldon – 6 receptions, 46 yards

==== Week 4: vs. Philadelphia Eagles ====
Week Four: Philadelphia Eagles at Tennessee Titans – Game summary

Quarter	1	2	3	4	OT	Total
Eagles	0	10	7	3	3	**23**
**Titans**	3	0	7	10	6	**26**

at Nissan Stadium, Nashville, Tennessee

- Date: September 30
- Game time: 12:00 p.m. CDT
- Game weather: 80 °F (27 °C), sunny
- Game attendance: 69,013
- Referee: Shawn Hochuli
- TV announcers (Fox): Chris Myers, Daryl Johnston and Laura Okmin
- Recap, Gamebook

Game information

**First quarter**

- TEN – Ryan Succop 42-yard field goal, 11:22. Titans 3–0. **Drive: 8 plays, 51 yards, 3:38.**

**Second quarter**

- PHI – Jordan Matthews 56-yard pass from Carson Wentz (Jake Elliott kick), 4:04. Eagles 7–3. **Drive: 8 plays, 97 yards, 4:52.**
- PHI – Jake Elliott 27-yard field goal, 0:00. Eagles 10–3. **Drive: 4 plays, 8 yards, 0:26.**

**Third quarter**

- PHI – Alshon Jeffery 16-yard pass from Carson Wentz (Jake Elliott kick), 7:36. Eagles 17–3. **Drive: 12 plays, 75 yards, 7:24.**
- TEN – Marcus Mariota 2-yard run (Ryan Succop kick), 2:51. Eagles 17–10. **Drive: 8 plays, 75 yards, 4:45.**

**Fourth quarter**

- TEN – Ryan Succop 33-yard field goal, 9:18. Eagles 17–13. **Drive: 8 plays, 20 yards, 4:45.**
- TEN – Tajae Sharpe 11-yard pass from Marcus Mariota (Ryan Succop kick), 5:01. Titans 20–17. **Drive: 5 plays, 75 yards, 2:54.**
- PHI – Jake Elliott 30-yard field goal, 0:16. Tied 20–20. **Drive: 6 plays, 27 yards, 1:25.**

**Overtime**

- PHI – Jake Elliott 37-yard field goal, 6:19. Eagles 23–20. **Drive: 9 plays, 56 yards, 3:41.**
- TEN – Corey Davis 10-yard pass from Marcus Mariota, 0:05. Titans 26–23. **Drive: 16 plays, 75 yards, 6:14.**

**Top passers**

- PHI – Carson Wentz – 33/50, 348 yards, 2 TD
- TEN – Marcus Mariota – 30/43, 344 yards, 2 TD, 1 INT

**Top rushers**

- PHI – Jay Ajayi – 15 carries, 70 yards
- TEN – Marcus Mariota – 10 carries, 46 yards, 1 TD

**Top receivers**

- PHI – Zach Ertz – 10 receptions, 112 yards
- TEN – Corey Davis – 9 receptions, 161 yards, 1 TD

==== Week 5: at Buffalo Bills ====
Week Five: Tennessee Titans at Buffalo Bills – Game summary

Quarter	1	2	3	4	Total
Titans	3	3	0	6	**12**
**Bills**	7	0	3	3	**13**

at New Era Field, Orchard Park, New York

- Date: October 7
- Game time: 1:00 p.m. EDT/12:00 p.m. CDT
- Game weather: 62 °F (17 °C), cloudy
- Game attendance: 68,202
- Referee: Tony Corrente
- TV announcers (CBS): Spero Dedes and Adam Archuleta
- Recap, Gamebook

Game information

**First quarter**

- BUF – Josh Allen 14-yard run (Stephen Hauschka kick), 9:03. Bills 7–0. **Drive: 11 plays, 47 yards, 5:26.**
- TEN – Ryan Succop 25-yard field goal, 1:35. Bills 7–3. **Drive: 7 plays, 18 yards, 3:27.**

**Second quarter**

- TEN – Ryan Succop 54-yard field goal, 0:00. Bills 7–6. **Drive: 11 plays, 52 yards, 5:03.**

**Third quarter**

- BUF – Stephen Hauschka 40-yard field goal, 1:59. Bills 10–6. **Drive: 7 plays, 27 yards, 3:47.**

**Fourth quarter**

- TEN – Ryan Succop 39-yard field goal, 10:30. Bills 10–9. **Drive: 14 plays, 54 yards, 6:29.**
- TEN – Ryan Succop 50-yard field goal, 4:43. Titans 12–10. **Drive: 7 plays, 22 yards, 3:08.**
- BUF – Stephen Hauschka 46-yard field goal, 0:00. Bills 13–12. **Drive: 11 plays, 47 yards, 4:43.**

**Top passers**

- TEN – Marcus Mariota – 14/26, 129 yards, INT
- BUF – Josh Allen – 10/19, 82 yards, INT

**Top rushers**

- TEN – Derrick Henry – 11 rushes, 56 yards
- BUF – LeSean McCoy – 24 rushes, 85 yards

**Top receivers**

- TEN – Corey Davis – 4 receptions, 49 yards
- BUF – Zay Jones – 3 receptions, 20 yards

==== Week 6: vs. Baltimore Ravens ====
Week Six: Baltimore Ravens at Tennessee Titans – Game summary

Quarter	1	2	3	4	Total
**Ravens**	7	7	7	0	**21**
Titans	0	0	0	0	**0**

at Nissan Stadium, Nashville, Tennessee

- Date: October 14
- Game time: 3:25 p.m. CDT
- Game weather: 66 °F (19 °C), rain
- Game attendance: 64,441
- Referee: Carl Cheffers
- TV announcers (CBS): Kevin Harlan, Rich Gannon and Steve Tasker
- Recap, Gamebook

Game information

**First quarter**

- BAL – Michael Crabtree 4-yard pass from Joe Flacco (Justin Tucker kick), 1:27. Ravens 7–0. **Drive: 17 plays, 94 yards, 9:09.**

**Second quarter**

- BAL – Alex Collins 13-yard run (Justin Tucker kick), 11:56. Ravens 14–0. **Drive: 7 plays, 52 yards, 2:53.**

**Third quarter**

- BAL – Alex Collins 2-yard run (Justin Tucker kick), 7:40. Ravens 21–0. **Drive: 12 plays, 78 yards, 7:20.**

**Fourth quarter**

- No scoring plays.

**Top passers**

- BAL – Joe Flacco – 25/37, 238 yards, TD, INT
- TEN – Marcus Mariota – 10/15, 117 yards

**Top rushers**

- BAL – Alex Collins – 19 rushes, 54 yards, 2 TDs
- TEN – Marcus Mariota – 2 rushes, 25 yards

**Top receivers**

- BAL – Michael Crabtree – 6 receptions, 93 yards, TD
- TEN – Tajae Sharpe – 2 receptions, 33 yards

==== Week 7: at Los Angeles Chargers ====
NFL London Games

Week Seven: Tennessee Titans at Los Angeles Chargers – Game summary

Quarter	1	2	3	4	Total
Titans	3	3	7	6	**19**
**Chargers**	10	0	7	3	**20**

at Wembley Stadium, London, England

- Date: October 21
- Game time: 2:30 p.m. BST/8:30 a.m. CDT
- Game weather: 66 °F (19 °C), sunny
- Game attendance: 84,301
- Referee: Walt Coleman
- TV announcers (CBS): Greg Gumbel, Trent Green, Bruce Arians and Melanie Collins
- Recap, Gamebook

Game information

**First quarter**

- TEN – Ryan Succop 28-yard field goal, 9:44. Titans 3–0. **Drive: 11 plays, 55 yards, 5:16.**
- LAC – Tyrell Williams 75-yard pass from Philip Rivers (Michael Badgley kick), 9:35. Chargers 7–3. **Drive: 1 plays, 75 yards, 0:09.**
- LAC – Michael Badgley 29-yard field goal, 1:48. Chargers 10–3. **Drive: 10 plays, 67 yards, 5:07.**

**Second quarter**

- TEN – Ryan Succop 33-yard field goal, 12:51. Chargers 10–6. **Drive: 8 plays, 50 yards, 3:57.**

**Third quarter**

- LAC – Mike Williams 55-yard pass from Philip Rivers (Michael Badgley kick), 13:46. Chargers 17–6. **Drive: 3 plays, 75 yards, 1:14.**
- TEN – Derrick Henry 1-yard run (Ryan Succop kick), 9:43. Chargers 17–13. **Drive: 7 plays, 42 yards, 4:03.**

**Fourth quarter**

- LAC – Michael Badgley 28-yard field goal, 12:29. Chargers 20–13. **Drive: 14 plays, 56 yards, 6:27.**
- TEN – Luke Stocker 1-yard pass from Marcus Mariota (pass failed), 0:31. Chargers 20–19. **Drive: 13 plays, 89 yards, 4:24.**

**Top passers**

- TEN – Marcus Mariota – 24/32, 237 yards, 1 TD, 1 INT
- LAC – Philip Rivers – 19/26, 306 yards, 2 TD

**Top rushers**

- TEN – Dion Lewis – 13 carries, 91 yards
- LAC – Austin Ekeler – 12 carries, 42 yards

**Top receivers**

- TEN – Tajae Sharpe – 7 receptions, 101 yards
- LAC – Keenan Allen – 5 receptions, 72 yards

==== Week 9: at Dallas Cowboys ====
Week Nine: Tennessee Titans at Dallas Cowboys – Game summary

Quarter	1	2	3	4	Total
**Titans**	0	14	7	7	**28**
Cowboys	7	7	0	0	**14**

at AT&T Stadium, Arlington, Texas

- Date: November 5
- Game time: 7:15 p.m. CST
- Game weather: Played indoors (retractable roof closed)
- Game attendance: 90,466
- Referee: Clete Blakeman
- TV announcers (ESPN): Joe Tessitore, Jason Witten, Booger McFarland and Lisa Salters
- Recap, Gamebook

Game information

**First quarter**

- DAL – Amari Cooper 4-yard pass from Dak Prescott (Brett Maher kick), 6:12. Cowboys 7–0. **Drive: 4 plays, 15 yards, 1:56.**

**Second quarter**

- TEN – Derrick Henry 1-yard run (Ryan Succop kick), 9:35. Tied 7–7. **Drive: 15 plays, 85 yards, 8:55.**
- TEN – Dion Lewis 18-yard pass from Marcus Mariota (Ryan Succop kick), 4:11. Titans 14–7. **Drive: 7 plays, 69 yards, 3:38.**
- DAL – Allen Hurns 23-yard pass from Dak Prescott (Brett Maher kick), 0:39. Tied 14–14. **Drive: 10 plays, 78 yards, 3:32.**

**Third quarter**

- TEN – Jonnu Smith 7-yard pass from Marcus Mariota (Ryan Succop kick), 5:44. Titans 21–14. **Drive: 7 plays, 40 yards, 3:18.**

**Fourth quarter**

- TEN – Marcus Mariota 9-yard run (Ryan Succop kick), 4:38. Titans 28–14. **Drive: 8 plays, 64 yards, 4:08.**

**Top passers**

- TEN – Marcus Mariota – 21/29, 240 yards, 2 TD
- DAL – Dak Prescott – 21/31, 243 yards, 2 TD, INT

**Top rushers**

- TEN – Dion Lewis – 19 carries, 62 yards
- DAL – Ezekiel Elliott – 17 carries, 61 yards

**Top receivers**

- TEN – Dion Lewis – 4 receptions, 60 yards, TD
- DAL – Amari Cooper – 5 receptions, 58 yards, TD

==== Week 10: vs. New England Patriots ====
Week Ten: New England Patriots at Tennessee Titans – Game summary

Quarter	1	2	3	4	Total
Patriots	3	7	0	0	**10**
**Titans**	17	7	3	7	**34**

at Nissan Stadium, Nashville, Tennessee

- Date: November 11
- Game time: 12:00 p.m. CST
- Game weather: 46 °F (8 °C), sunny
- Game attendance: 69,363
- Referee: Bill Vinovich
- TV announcers (CBS): Ian Eagle, Dan Fouts and Evan Washburn
- Recap, Gamebook

Game information

**First quarter**

- TEN – Jonnu Smith 4-yard pass from Marcus Mariota (Ryan Succop kick), 11:29. Titans 7–0. **Drive: 7 plays, 40 yards, 3:31.**
- NE – Stephen Gostkowski 52-yard field goal, 9:19. Titans 7–3. **Drive: 7 plays, 41 yards, 2:10.**
- TEN – Corey Davis 23-yard pass from Marcus Mariota (Ryan Succop kick), 5:58. Titans 14–3. **Drive: 9 plays, 78 yards, 3:21.**
- TEN – Ryan Succop 33-yard field goal, 2:35. Titans 17–3. **Drive: 5 plays, 34 yards, 1:36.**

**Second quarter**

- NE – James Develin 1-yard run (Stephen Gostkowski kick), 12:49. Titans 17–10. **Drive: 10 plays, 75 yards, 4:46.**
- TEN – Derrick Henry 1-yard run (Ryan Succop kick), 1:08. Titans 24–10. **Drive: 8 plays, 37 yards, 4:17.**

**Third quarter**

- TEN – Ryan Succop 31-yard field goal, 4:15. Titans 27–10. **Drive: 10 plays, 78 yards, 4:51.**

**Fourth quarter**

- TEN – Derrick Henry 10-yard run (Ryan Succop kick), 7:13. Titans 34–10. **Drive: 6 plays, 58 yards, 3:35.**

**Top passers**

- NE – Tom Brady – 21/41, 254 yards
- TEN – Marcus Mariota – 16/24, 228 yards, 2 TD

**Top rushers**

- NE – Sony Michel – 11 carries, 31 yards
- TEN – Derrick Henry – 11 carries, 58 yards, 2 TD

**Top receivers**

- NE – Julian Edelman – 9 receptions, 104 yards
- TEN – Corey Davis – 7 receptions, 125 yards, TD

This was the Titans first win against the Patriots since 2002.

==== Week 11: at Indianapolis Colts ====
Week Eleven: Tennessee Titans at Indianapolis Colts – Game summary

Quarter	1	2	3	4	Total
Titans	0	3	0	7	**10**
**Colts**	7	17	7	7	**38**

at Lucas Oil Stadium, Indianapolis, Indiana

- Date: November 18
- Game time: 1:00 p.m. EST/12:00 p.m. CST
- Game weather: Played indoors (retractable roof closed)
- Game attendance: 57,401
- Referee: John Hussey
- TV announcers (CBS): Andrew Catalon and James Lofton
- Recap, Gamebook

Game information

**First quarter**

- IND – Marlon Mack 1-yard rush (Adam Vinatieri kick), 1:15. Colts 7–0. **Drive: 7 plays, 33 yards, 3:36.**

**Second quarter**

- IND – Adam Vinatieri 22-yard field goal, 10:59. Colts 10–0. **Drive: 8 plays, 54 yards, 2:54.**
- IND – T. Y. Hilton 68-yard pass from Andrew Luck (Adam Vinatieri kick), 7:26. Colts 17–0. **Drive: 4 plays, 87 yards, 1:35.**
- IND – Jordan Wilkins 18-yard rush (Adam Vinatieri kick), 2:29. Colts 24–0. **Drive: 5 plays, 85 yards, 2:54.**
- TEN – Ryan Succop 42-yard field goal, 0:00. Colts 24–3. **Drive: 11 plays, 51 yards, 2:29.**

**Third quarter**

- IND – T. Y. Hilton 14-yard pass from Andrew Luck (Adam Vinatieri kick), 7:24. Colts 31–3. **Drive: 3 plays, 21 yards, 0:54.**

**Fourth quarter**

- IND – Dontrelle Inman 7-yard pass from Andrew Luck (Adam Vinatieri kick), 12:12. Colts 38–3. **Drive: 13 plays, 85 yards, 7:33.**
- TEN – Tajae Sharpe 1-yard pass from Blaine Gabbert (Ryan Succop kick), 1:49. Colts 38–10. **Drive: 12 plays, 94 yards, 6:11.**

**Top passers**

- TEN – Blaine Gabbert – 11/16, 118 yards, TD, INT
- IND – Andrew Luck – 23/29, 297 yards, 3 TD

**Top rushers**

- TEN – Derrick Henry – 9 carries, 46 yards
- IND – Marlon Mack – 16 carries, 61 yards, TD

**Top receivers**

- TEN – Jonnu Smith – 6 receptions, 44 yards
- IND – T. Y. Hilton – 9 receptions, 155 yards, 2 TD

==== Week 12: at Houston Texans ====
Week Twelve: Tennessee Titans at Houston Texans – Game summary

Quarter	1	2	3	4	Total
Titans	10	0	7	0	**17**
**Texans**	7	17	3	7	**34**

at NRG Stadium, Houston, Texas

- Date: November 26
- Game time: 7:15 p.m. CST
- Game weather: Played indoors (retractable roof closed)
- Game attendance: 71,826
- Referee: Craig Wrolstad
- TV announcers (ESPN): Joe Tessitore, Jason Witten, Booger McFarland and Lisa Salters
- Recap, Gamebook

Game information

**First quarter**

- TEN – Ryan Succop 31-yard field goal, 11:50. Titans 3–0. **Drive: 6 plays, 62 yards, 3:13.**
- TEN – Jonnu Smith 61-yard pass from Marcus Mariota (Ryan Succop kick), 9:21. Titans 10–0. **Drive: 2 plays, 69 yards, 0:47.**
- HOU – Demaryius Thomas 12-yard pass from Deshaun Watson (Kaʻimi Fairbairn kick), 5:21. Titans 10–7. **Drive: 7 plays, 62 yards, 4:00.**

**Second quarter**

- HOU – Deshaun Watson 15-yard run (Kaʻimi Fairbarin kick), 14:53. Texans 14–10. **Drive: 5 plays, 60 yards, 1:58.**
- HOU – Lamar Miller 97-yard run (Kaʻimi Fairbairn kick), 9:22. Texans 21–10. **Drive: 1 play, 97 yards, 0:14.**
- HOU – Kaʻimi Fairbairn 42-yard field goal, 0:01. Texans 24–10. **Drive: 5 plays, 37 yards, 0:45.**

**Third quarter**

- HOU – Kaʻimi Fairbairn 47-yard field goal, 8:53. Texans 27–10. **Drive: 11 plays, 46 yards, 6:07.**
- TEN – Corey Davis 48-yard pass from Marcus Mariota (Ryan Succop kick), 0:13. Texans 27–17. **Drive: 3 plays, 51 yards, 1:47.**

**Fourth quarter**

- HOU – Demaryius Thomas 10-yard pass from Deshaun Watson (Kaʻimi Fairbairn kick), 8:15. Texans 34–17. **Drive: 7 plays, 60 yards, 3:24.**

**Top passers**

- TEN – Marcus Mariota – 22/23, 303 yards, 2 TD
- HOU – Deshaun Watson – 19/24, 210 yards, 2 TD

**Top rushers**

- TEN – Corey Davis – 1 carries, 39 yards
- HOU – Lamar Miller – 12 carries, 162 yards, TD

**Top receivers**

- TEN – Corey Davis – 4 receptions, 96 yards, TD
- HOU – DeAndre Hopkins – 5 receptions, 74 yards

==== Week 13: vs. New York Jets ====
Week Thirteen: New York Jets at Tennessee Titans – Game summary

Quarter	1	2	3	4	Total
Jets	10	6	6	0	**22**
**Titans**	0	6	7	13	**26**

at Nissan Stadium, Nashville, Tennessee

- Date: December 2
- Game time: 3:05 p.m. CST
- Game weather: 70 °F (21 °C), sunny
- Game attendance: 60,904
- Referee: Jerome Boger
- TV announcers (CBS): Kevin Harlan, Rich Gannon and Steve Tasker
- Recap, Gamebook

Game information

**First quarter**

- NYJ – Jason Myers 54-yard field goal, 9:35. Jets 3–0. **Drive: 8 plays, 25 yards, 2:43.**
- NYJ – Trumaine Johnson 31-yard interception return (Jason Myers kick), 7:59. Jets 10–0.

**Second quarter**

- NYJ – Jason Myers 34-yard field goal, 11:41. Jets 13–0. **Drive: 14 plays, 59 yards, 6:51.**
- NYJ – Jason Myers 43-yard field goal, 2:51. Jets 16–0. **Drive: 4 plays, 3 yards, 2:11.**
- TEN – Anthony Firkser 12-yard pass from Marcus Mariota (kick blocked), 0:57. Jets 16–6. **Drive: 6 plays, 68 yards, 1:54.**

**Third quarter**

- NYJ – Jason Myers 39-yard field goal, 10:39. Jets 19–6. **Drive: 6 plays, 39 yards, 2:28.**
- TEN – Derrick Henry 1-yard rush (Ryan Succop kick), 7:44. Jets 19–13. **Drive: 6 plays, 75 yards, 2:55.**
- NYJ – Jason Myers 39-yard field goal, 0:26. Jets 22–13. **Drive: 15 plays, 55 yards, 7:18.**

**Fourth quarter**

- TEN – Ryan Succop 24-yard field goal, 9:29. Jets 22–16. **Drive: 8 plays, 48 yards, 4:08.**
- TEN – Ryan Succop 33-yard field goal, 5:39. Jets 22–19. **Drive: 5 plays, 50 yards, 1:43.**
- TEN – Corey Davis 11-yard pass from Marcus Mariota (Ryan Succop kick), 0:36. Titans 26–22. **Drive: 6 plays, 86 yards, 1:10.**

**Top passers**

- NYJ – Josh McCown – 17/30, 128 yards, 1 INT
- TEN – Marcus Mariota – 20/35, 282 yards, 2 TD, 1 INT

**Top rushers**

- NYJ – Isaiah Crowell – 21 carries, 98 yards
- TEN – Marcus Mariota – 4 carries, 43 yards

**Top receivers**

- NYJ – Robby Anderson – 4 receptions, 48 yards
- TEN – Taywan Taylor – 3 receptions, 104 yards

==== Week 14: vs. Jacksonville Jaguars ====
Week Fourteen: Jacksonville Jaguars at Tennessee Titans – Game summary

Quarter	1	2	3	4	Total
Jaguars	2	0	7	0	**9**
**Titans**	7	9	14	0	**30**

at Nissan Stadium, Nashville, Tennessee

- Date: December 6
- Game time: 7:20 p.m. CST
- Game weather: 44 °F (7 °C), clear
- Game attendance: 60,344
- Referee: John Parry
- TV announcers (Fox/NFLN): Joe Buck, Troy Aikman, Erin Andrews and Kristina Pink
- Recap, Gamebook

Game information

**First quarter**

- TEN – Derrick Henry 3-yard rush (Ryan Succop kick), 9:30. Titans 7–0. **Drive: 10 plays, 73 yards, 5:30.**
- JAX – Cameron Batson tackled by Leon Jacobs in end zone for safety, 0:45. Titans 7–2.

**Second quarter**

- TEN – Derrick Henry 99-yard rush (kick failed), 7:07. Titans 13–2. **Drive: 1 plays, 99 yards, 0:18.**
- TEN – Ryan Succop 33-yard field goal, 0:05. Titans 16–2. **Drive: 8 plays, 25 yards, 1:12.**

**Third quarter**

- TEN – Derrick Henry 16-yard rush (Ryan Succop kick), 7:19. Titans 23–2. **Drive: 10 plays, 78 yards, 5:36.**
- TEN – Derrick Henry 54-yard rush (Ryan Succop kick), 5:30. Titans 30–2. **Drive: 1 plays, 54 yards, 0:11.**
- JAX – Dede Westbrook 7-yard pass from Cody Kessler (Josh Lambo kick), 1:49. Titans 30–9. **Drive: 11 plays, 67 yards, 3:41.**

**Fourth quarter**

- No scoring plays.

**Top passers**

- JAX – Cody Kessler – 25/43, 240 yards, TD
- TEN – Marcus Mariota – 18/24, 162 yards, INT

**Top rushers**

- JAX – Leonard Fournette – 14 carries, 36 yards
- TEN – Derrick Henry – 17 carries, 238 yards, 4 TD

**Top receivers**

- JAX – Dede Westbrook – 7 receptions, 88 yards, TD
- TEN – Taywan Taylor – 6 receptions, 59 yards

==== Week 15: at New York Giants ====
Week Fifteen: Tennessee Titans at New York Giants – Game summary

Quarter	1	2	3	4	Total
**Titans**	7	0	7	3	**17**
Giants	0	0	0	0	**0**

at MetLife Stadium, East Rutherford, New Jersey

- Date: December 16
- Game time: 1:00 p.m. EST/12:00 p.m. CST
- Game weather: 40 °F (4 °C), rain
- Game attendance: 74,538
- Referee: Shawn Hochuli
- TV announcers (CBS): Greg Gumbel, Trent Green, Bruce Arians and Melanie Collins
- Recap, Gamebook

Game information

**First quarter**

- TEN – Derrick Henry 1-yard rush (Ryan Succop kick), 2:43. Titans 7–0. **Drive: 15 plays, 75 yards, 7:45.**

**Second quarter**

- No scoring plays.

**Third quarter**

- TEN – Derrick Henry 1-yard rush (Ryan Succop kick), 2:20. Titans 14–0. **Drive: 5 plays, 14 yards, 2:47.**

**Fourth quarter**

- TEN – Ryan Succop 22-yard field goal, 5:06. Titans 17–0. **Drive: 11 plays, 49 yards, 7:03.**

**Top passers**

- TEN – Marcus Mariota – 12/20, 88 yards
- NYG – Eli Manning – 21/44, 229 yards, INT

**Top rushers**

- TEN – Derrick Henry – 33 carries, 170 yards, 2 TD
- NYG – Saquon Barkley – 14 carries, 31 yards

**Top receivers**

- TEN – Corey Davis – 3 receptions, 33 yards
- NYG – Evan Engram – 8 receptions, 75 yards

==== Week 16: vs. Washington Redskins ====
Week Sixteen: Washington Redskins at Tennessee Titans – Game summary

Quarter	1	2	3	4	Total
Redskins	3	7	3	3	**16**
**Titans**	6	3	0	16	**25**

at Nissan Stadium, Nashville, Tennessee

- Date: December 22
- Game time: 3:30 p.m. CST
- Game weather: 51 °F (11 °C), sunny
- Game attendance: 60,746
- Referee: John Hussey
- TV announcers (NFLN): Curt Menefee, Steve Mariucci and Nate Burleson
- Recap, Gamebook

Game information

**First quarter**

- WAS – Dustin Hopkins 50-yard field goal, 12:14. Redskins 3–0. **Drive: 7 plays, 40 yards, 2:51.**
- TEN – Derrick Henry 1-yard run (kick failed), 5:41. Titans 6–3. **Drive: 11 plays, 69 yards, 6:32.**

**Second quarter**

- WAS – Michael Floyd 7-yard pass from Josh Johnson (Dustin Hopkins kick), 4:34. Redskins 10–6. **Drive: 17 plays, 93 yards, 10:58.**
- TEN – Ryan Succop 42-yard field goal, 0:01. Redskins 10–9. **Drive: 13 plays, 51 yards, 4:28.**

**Third quarter**

- WAS – Dustin Hopkins 40-yard field goal, 5:01. Redskins 13–9. **Drive: 11 plays, 64 yards, 5:18.**

**Fourth quarter**

- TEN – Ryan Succop 33-yard field goal, 15:00. Redskins 13–12. **Drive: 10 plays, 60 yards, 5:02.**
- WAS – Dustin Hopkins 46-yard field goal, 8:14. Redskins 16–12. **Drive: 12 plays, 47 yards, 6:46.**
- TEN – MyCole Pruitt 2-yard pass from Blaine Gabbert (Ryan Succop kick), 4:35. Titans 19–16. **Drive: 7 plays, 75 yards, 3:39.**
- TEN – Malcolm Butler 56-yard interception return, 0:00. Titans 25–16.

**Top passers**

- WAS – Josh Johnson – 13/23, 153 yards, TD, 2 INT
- TEN – Marcus Mariota – 10/13, 110 yards

**Top rushers**

- WAS – Adrian Peterson – 26 rushes, 119 yards
- TEN – Derrick Henry – 21 rushes, 84 yards, TD

**Top receivers**

- WAS – Jamison Crowder – 5 receptions, 78 yards
- TEN – Taywan Taylor – 3 receptions, 64 yards

The Titans were the only AFC South team to defeat all four of their NFC East opponents in 2018.

==== Week 17: vs. Indianapolis Colts ====
Week Seventeen: Indianapolis Colts at Tennessee Titans – Game summary

Quarter	1	2	3	4	Total
**Colts**	7	10	7	9	**33**
Titans	0	10	7	0	**17**

at Nissan Stadium, Nashville, Tennessee

- Date: December 30
- Game time: 7:20 p.m. CST
- Game weather: 53 °F (12 °C), clear
- Game attendance: 68,978
- Referee: Walt Anderson
- TV announcers (NBC): Al Michaels, Cris Collinsworth and Michele Tafoya
- Recap, Gamebook

Game information

**First quarter**

- IND – Dontrelle Inman 11-yard pass from Andrew Luck (Adam Vinatieri kick), 6:39. Colts 7–0. **Drive: 12 plays, 92 yards, 6:46.**

**Second quarter**

- IND – Eric Ebron 9-yard pass from Andrew Luck (Adam Vinatieri kick), 9:26. Colts 14–0. **Drive: 16 plays, 90 yards, 9:58.**
- TEN – Jayon Brown 22-yard interception return (Ryan Succop kick), 6:35. Colts 14–7.
- IND – Adam Vinatieri 53-yard field goal, 0:39. Colts 17–7. **Drive: 7 plays, 60 yards, 1:46.**
- TEN – Ryan Succop 38-yard field goal, 0:00. Colts 17–10. **Drive: 7 plays, 55 yards, 0:39.**

**Third quarter**

- IND – Ryan Hewitt 1-yard pass from Andrew Luck (Adam Vinatieri kick), 10:46. Colts 24–10. **Drive: 7 plays, 68 yards, 4:14.**
- TEN – Luke Stocker 22-yard pass from Blaine Gabbert (Ryan Succop kick), 1:47. Colts 24–17. **Drive: 2 plays, 55 yards, 0:36.**

**Fourth quarter**

- IND – Adam Vinatieri 25-yard field goal, 3:55. Colts 27–17. **Drive: 9 plays, 31 yards, 5:10.**
- IND – Marlon Mack 8-yard rush (kick failed), 2:24. Colts 33–17. **Drive: 1 plays, 8 yards, 0:04.**

**Top passers**

- IND – Andrew Luck – 24/35, 285 yards, 3 TD, 1 INT
- TEN – Blaine Gabbert – 18/29, 165 yards, 1 TD, 2 INT

**Top rushers**

- IND – Marlon Mack – 25 carries, 119 yards, 1 TD
- TEN – Derrick Henry – 16 carries, 93 yards

**Top receivers**

- IND – Dontrelle Inman – 5 receptions, 77 yards, 1 TD
- TEN – Corey Davis – 5 receptions, 48 yards

In this "win or go home" game, not having their starting quarterback, and having no answer to Marlon Mack proved to be the deciding factor, as the Colts won 33-17, ending Tennessee's season, as they finished with a 9-7 record for the third year in a row.

=== Standings ===
==== Division ====
AFC South
	W	L	T	PCT	DIV	CONF	PF	PA	STK
^{(3)} Houston Texans	11	5	0	.688	4–2	9–3	402	316	W1
^{(6)} Indianapolis Colts	10	6	0	.625	4–2	7–5	433	344	W4
Tennessee Titans	9	7	0	.563	3–3	5–7	310	303	L1
Jacksonville Jaguars	5	11	0	.313	1–5	4–8	245	316	L1

==== Conference ====
AFC
#	Team	Division	W	L	T	PCT	DIV	CONF	SOS	SOV	STK
**Division leaders**
1 (Note: Kansas City finished ahead of LA Chargers in the AFC West based on division record, claiming the No. 1 seed.)	Kansas City Chiefs	West	12	4	0	.750	5–1	10–2	.480	.401	W1
2 (Note: New England claimed the No. 2 seed over Houston based on head-to-head victory.)	New England Patriots	East	11	5	0	.688	5–1	8–4	.482	.494	W2
3	Houston Texans	South	11	5	0	.688	4–2	9–3	.471	.435	W1
4	Baltimore Ravens	North	10	6	0	.625	3–3	8–4	.496	.450	W3
**Wild Cards**
5	Los Angeles Chargers	West	12	4	0	.750	4–2	9–3	.477	.422	W1
6	Indianapolis Colts	South	10	6	0	.625	4–2	7–5	.465	.456	W4
**Did not qualify for the postseason**
7	Pittsburgh Steelers	North	9	6	1	.594	4–1–1	6–5–1	.504	.448	W1
8	Tennessee Titans	South	9	7	0	.563	3–3	5–7	.520	.465	L1
9	Cleveland Browns	North	7	8	1	.469	3–2–1	5–6–1	.516	.411	L1
10	Miami Dolphins	East	7	9	0	.438	4–2	6–6	.469	.446	L3
11 (Note: Denver finished ahead of Cincinnati and Buffalo based on strength of victory. Cincinnati finished ahead of Buffalo based on record vs. common opponents. Cincinnati's cumulative record against Baltimore, Indianapolis, the Los Angeles Chargers and Miami was 3–2, compared to Buffalo's 1–4 cumulative record against the same four teams.)	Denver Broncos	West	6	10	0	.375	2–4	4–8	.523	.464	L4
12	Cincinnati Bengals	North	6	10	0	.375	1–5	4–8	.535	.448	L2
13	Buffalo Bills	East	6	10	0	.375	2–4	4–8	.523	.411	W1
14	Jacksonville Jaguars	South	5	11	0	.313	1–5	4–8	.549	.463	L1
15 (Note: NY Jets finished ahead of Oakland based on strength of victory.)	New York Jets	East	4	12	0	.250	1–5	3–9	.506	.438	L3
16	Oakland Raiders	West	4	12	0	.250	1–5	3–9	.547	.406	L1
**Tiebreakers** (Note: When breaking ties for three or more teams under the NFL's rules, they are first broken within divisions, then comparing only the highest ranked remaining team from each division.)
