= Donovan Woods (American football) =

American football player (born 1985)

No. 95
- Position: Linebacker

Personal information
- Born: July 27, 1985 (age 41); Oklahoma City, Oklahoma, U.S.
- Listed height: 6 ft 2 in (1.88 m)
- Listed weight: 230 lb (104 kg)

Career information
- High school: Millwood (Oklahoma City)
- College: Oklahoma State
- NFL draft: 2008: undrafted

Career history
- Pittsburgh Steelers (2008–2009); Dallas Cowboys (2009–2010)*; Buffalo Bills (2010)*
- * Offseason or practice squad member only

Awards and highlights
- Super Bowl champion (XLIII)

Career NFL statistics
- Total tackles: 5
- Stats at Pro Football Reference

Donovan Woods (born July 27, 1985) is an American former professional football player who was a linebacker in the National Football League (NFL) for the Pittsburgh Steelers, Dallas Cowboys and Buffalo Bills. He played college football for the Oklahoma State Cowboys. Woods was signed by the Pittsburgh Steelers as an undrafted free agent in 2008.

== Early life ==
Woods attended Millwood High School. He initially played as a defensive back. He became the starting quarterback as a junior. He helped lead the school to 3 consecutive Class 2A state championships.

As a senior, he registered 132-of-244 completions for 2,453 yards, 32 passing touchdowns, 6 interceptions, 119 carries for 1,081 yards and 15 rushing touchdowns.

== College career ==
Woods accepted a football scholarship from Oklahoma State University. As a redshirt freshman, he posted 97-of-187 completions for 1,628 yards, 13 passing touchdowns (school freshman record), 9 rushing touchdowns, 1,855 total offense yards (school freshman record). He had 224 passing yards, one passing touchdown, 16 carries for 41 yards and one rushing touchdown against the University of Texas. The team qualified for the 2004 Alamo Bowl.

As a sophomore, he began the season as the starting quarterback, passing for 117 yards in the win against Montana State University. In week 3, Bobby Reid was named the starter at quarterback and Woods was converted into a safety. He started the final five games at free safety. He finished the season with 32 tackles (4 for loss), 2 interceptions, one forced fumble, one quarterback hurry, one pass defensed, 17-of-32 completions for 163 yards, one passing touchdown and 61 rushing yards.

As a junior, he started 12 games at free safety. He tallied 62 tackles (fifth on the team), 2 interceptions, 4 passes defensed and returned a fumble for a 57-yard touchdown.

As a senior, he led the team with 82 tackles, starting every game except against Texas Tech (when the team went with an extra defensive back). He was named Defensive MVP of the 2007 Insight Bowl. He majored in general business.

== Professional career ==
=== Pittsburgh Steelers ===
Woods was signed as an undrafted free agent by the Pittsburgh Steelers after the 2008 NFL draft on April 28. He was waived on October 25. He was signed to the practice squad on November 1. He was promoted to the active roster on November 8. He was released on November 11. He was signed to the practice squad on November 12. He appeared in six games for the Super Bowl Champion, and had 5 special teams tackles.

In 2009, he was released on September 5. He was signed to the practice squad on September 6. He was promoted to the active roster on November 17. He was released on November 24.

=== Dallas Cowboys ===
On November 30, 2009, he was signed by the Dallas Cowboys to their practice squad, where he spent the remainder of the season. On July 20, 2010, the Cowboys cut him to make room for the new draft choices. He then left to work for the Steelers.

=== Buffalo Bills ===
On July 30, 2010, he was signed as a free agent by the Buffalo Bills. On September 4, he was released later at the end of preseason as part of the team's final roster cuts.
