= Millwood High School (Oklahoma) =

Coordinates: 35.5413°N 97.4739°W

Location
- 6718 North Martin Luther King Avenue; Oklahoma City, Oklahoma 73111

Information
- School type: Public
- Established: 1971
- School district: Millwood Public Schools
- NCES District ID: 4020080
- Superintendent: Cecilia J. Robinson-Woods
- NCES School ID: 402008002068
- Principal: Patrice Cannon
- Grades: 9-12
- Enrollment: 332
- Student to teacher ratio: 19.44
- Colors: Blue, Red
- Mascot: Falcon
- Website: http://millwoodps.org

Millwoood High School is a Public High School in Oklahoma City, Oklahoma. It is part of Millwood Public Schools.

== History ==
Millwood High School was established after 35 patrons at a meeting in 1970 voted to create a new independent school district and to build a new High School. It held its first graduation ceremony in 1972.

From 1976 to 1977, the school regularly made national headlines after a student got kicked off the baseball team for being a girl. The school had no girls' softball team. She was told that she could be on the football or wrestling team instead, but she had been rejected from the football team the year before. The girl's family sued the school in response. A district judge ruled in her favor.

In 2001, a woman and her two daughters were arrested for assaulting the principal and another school employee. They were upset about actions that took place during a suspension hearing concerning a male family member.

Jena Nelson announced her campaign for congress at the school.

Students at the school have participated in discussions about racial issues and the legacy of slavery despite state law restricting those subjects.

== Athletics ==
The falcon is the school mascot and the school colors are blue and red.

The school has won 18 state championships in basketball, the most of any school in the state. They were all won at the fairgrounds arena. Varryl Franklin coached at the school for 40 years.

The football team plays Frederick A. Douglass High School in the Soul Bowl. Football player Marcus Major rushed for more than 2,000 yards and 35 touchdowns at the school. He went on to play for the University of Oklahoma and University of Minnesota. Xavier Thompson was a star receiver at the school.

== Alumni ==
- Cameron Batson football wide receiver
- Donovan Woods, former linebacker
- Nick Graham defensive back
- D'Juan Woods wide receiver
- Rashaun Woods wide receiver
- Joey Mickey tight end
- Gary Lewis nose tackle
- Gerald Jones: Class of 2007, WR.
- Josh Turner, cornerback, class of 2011
- Demariyon Houston, wide receiver, class of 2019
- Israel Antwine Class of 2018, DL.
- Tramain Swindall, wide receiver Class of 2007
- Cameron Batson, wide receiver, class of 2014
- Davion Pierson Class of 2011, DL.
- Brandon Swindall, wide receiver, class of 2011
- Joey Mickey
