= Nick Graham (American football) =

American football player and coach (born 1984)

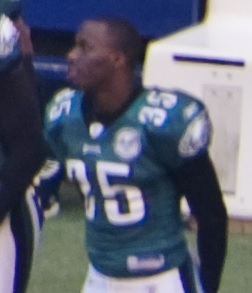
- Graham with the Philadelphia Eagles in 2007

UTSA Roadrunners
- Title: Assistant head coach, cornerbacks coach

Personal information
- Born: January 10, 1984 (age 42); Oklahoma City, Oklahoma, U.S.
- Listed height: 5 ft 10 in (1.78 m)
- Listed weight: 191 lb (87 kg)

Career information
- Position: Cornerback (No. 35, 42, 27, 22, 14)
- High school: Millwood (Oklahoma City)
- College: Tulsa
- NFL draft: 2007: undrafted

Career history

Playing
- Philadelphia Eagles (2007); Indianapolis Colts (2008); Saskatchewan Roughriders (2010–2012); Hamilton Tiger-Cats (2012)

Coaching
- Tulsa (2013) Student assistant; Tulsa (2014–2015) Defensive analyst; Central Oklahoma (2016–2018) Defensive backs coach; McNeese State (2019) Safeties coach; UTSA (2020–2023) Cornerbacks coach; UTSA (2024–present) Assistant head coach & cornerbacks coach

Awards and highlights
- 2× Second-team All-C-USA (2005, 2006)

Career NFL statistics
- Total tackles: 17
- Fumble recoveries: 1
- Stats at Pro Football Reference

Career CFL statistics
- Games played: 27
- Total tackles: 95
- Interceptions: 2

Nicholas Donnell Graham (born January 19, 1984) is an American former professional football cornerback and is the assistant head coach and cornerbacks coach at University of Texas–San Antonio. He was signed by the Philadelphia Eagles as an undrafted free agent in 2007. He was also a member of the Indianapolis Colts of the NFL and the Saskatchewan Roughriders and Hamilton Tiger-Cats of the Canadian Football League (CFL). He played college football at Tulsa.

== College career ==
Graham played in 12 games as a true freshmen. As a sophomore, he started five of the 12 games he played in while recording 40 tackles.

As a junior, he recorded 72 tackles and six interceptions. In his senior season, he recorded 53 tackles and one interception. During overtime against Navy, he made a game-winning block on an extra point attempt.

At Tulsa, Graham appeared in 50 games (30 starts) while logging 180 tackles and seven interceptions. He was a two-time second-team All-Conference USA selection.

== Professional career ==
=== Philadelphia Eagles ===
Graham was signed by the Philadelphia Eagles as an undrafted free agent following the 2007 NFL draft. He was inactive for the team's regular season opener and made his NFL debut against the Washington Redskins on September 17. He went on to play in 15 games for the Eagles as a rookie, recording 11 tackles.

Graham was waived by the Eagles on August 30, 2008 during final cuts.

=== Indianapolis Colts ===
Graham was signed by the Indianapolis Colts on October 8, 2008 after the team released running back Justin Forsett and offensive tackle Corey Hilliard. He was released on October 14. The Colts re-signed him on October 22 after releasing cornerback Keiwan Ratliff. Graham was placed on season-ending injured reserve on November 18, 2008.

After being re-signed and competing for a backup cornerback job with the Colts during the 2009 off-season Graham was waived/injured during final cuts on September 5, 2009. Graham reached an injury settlement with the Colts on September 12, 2009.

=== Hamilton Tiger-Cats ===
Graham signed with the Hamilton Tiger-Cats on August 28, 2012.
