= Marcus Mariota =

American football player (born 1993)

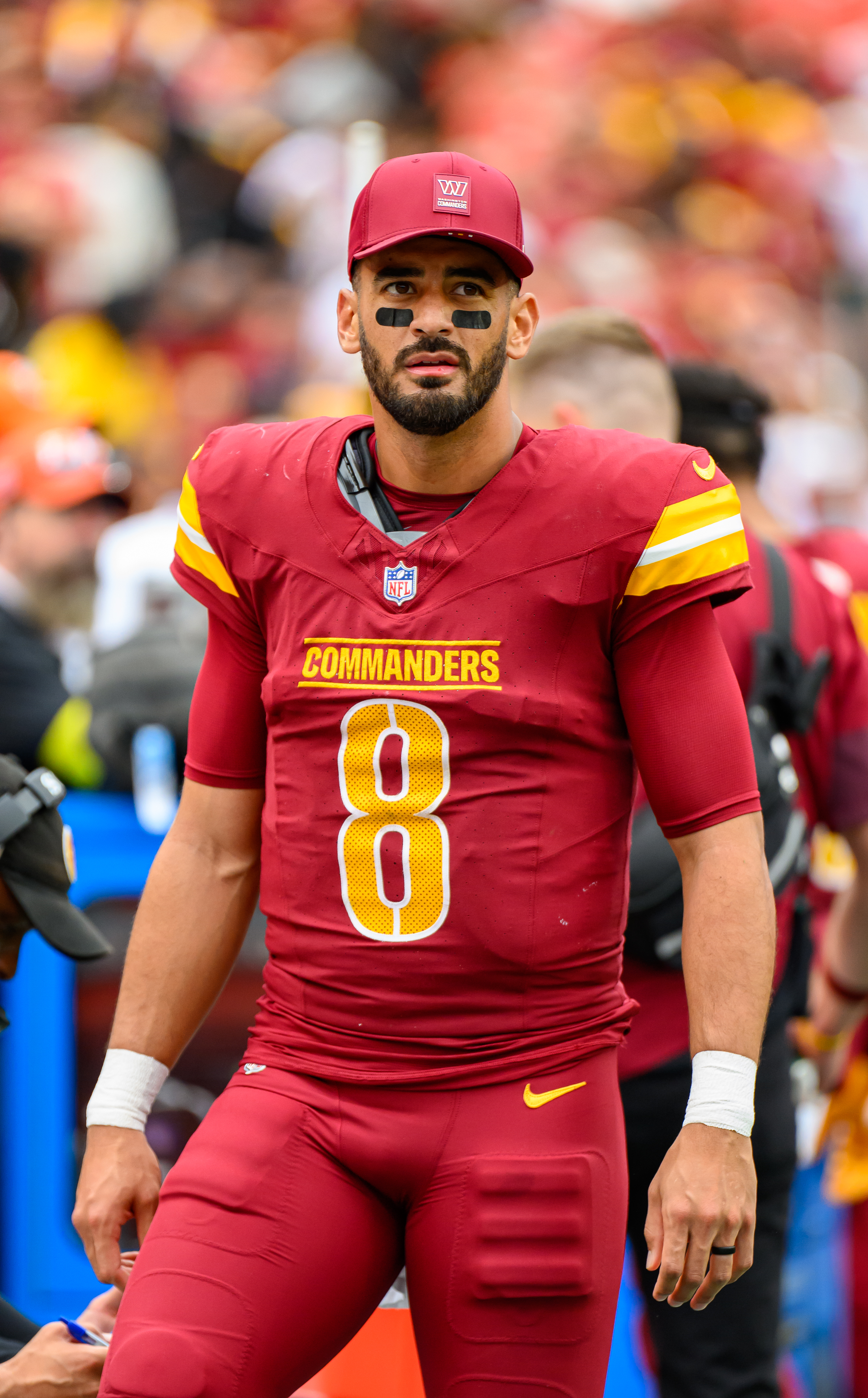
- Mariota with the Washington Commanders in 2025

No. 8 – Washington Commanders
- Position: Quarterback
- Roster status: Active

Personal information
- Born: October 30, 1993 (age 33); Honolulu, Hawaii, U.S.
- Listed height: 6 ft 4 in (1.93 m)
- Listed weight: 222 lb (101 kg)

Career information
- High school: Saint Louis (Honolulu)
- College: Oregon (2011–2014)
- NFL draft: 2015: 1st round, 2nd overall pick

Career history
- Tennessee Titans (2015–2019); Las Vegas Raiders (2020–2021); Atlanta Falcons (2022); Philadelphia Eagles (2023); Washington Commanders (2024–present)

Awards and highlights
- Heisman Trophy (2014); Unanimous All-American (2014)

Career NFL statistics as of Week 4, 2026
- Passing attempts: 2,440
- Passing completions: 1,533
- Completion percentage: 62.8%
- TD–INT: 111–62
- Passing yards: 18,219
- Passer rating: 90.1
- Rushing yards: 2,502
- Rushing touchdowns: 19
- Stats at Pro Football Reference

Marcus Ardel Taulauniu Mariota (born October 30, 1993) is an American professional football quarterback for the Washington Commanders of the National Football League (NFL). He played college football for the Oregon Ducks, winning the Heisman Trophy in 2014. Mariota was selected second overall by the Tennessee Titans in the 2015 NFL draft.

Serving as the primary starter during his first four seasons, Mariota helped the Titans in 2017 reach the playoffs for the first time since 2008 and win a postseason game for the first time since 2003. However, his tenure was also marked by injuries and inconsistent play, which led to Mariota losing his starting position to Ryan Tannehill in 2019 and spending the next two years as a backup with the Las Vegas Raiders. Mariota was named the starter of the Atlanta Falcons in 2022, but was released after his season was cut short by injury. He later spent one season as a backup with the Philadelphia Eagles before joining the Commanders in 2024.

== Early life ==
Mariota was born in Honolulu, Hawaii, on October 30, 1993, to Alana Deppe-Mariota and Toa Mariota. He is of Samoan descent on his father's side and German descent on his mother's side. Mariota grew up admiring the quarterback play of fellow Samoan Jeremiah Masoli, who was also a standout quarterback at the Saint Louis School and the University of Oregon. Mariota describes himself as a dedicated Christian. Mariota has a younger brother, Matt, who also played football at Oregon, primarily on special teams.

Mariota attended the Saint Louis School in Honolulu, where he was a two-sport star in football and track and field. In football, Mariota was relatively unknown until late in his high school career due to not starting until his senior season. Mariota's parents sold their home overlooking Diamond Head in part to finance football camps that would gain him exposure. As a senior, Mariota helped lead St. Louis to an 11–1 record and the Hawaii Division I state title, while being named PrepStar Magazine All-West Region and Interscholastic League of Honolulu Offensive Player of the Year. He threw for 2,597 yards on 165-of-225 passing attempts (64.7%), including 32 touchdowns against only five interceptions. Mariota also rushed 60 times for 455 yards (7.6 yards per carry) and seven touchdowns. He was named to the NUC All World Game alongside eventual 2012 Heisman Trophy winner Johnny Manziel.

Also a standout track and field athlete, Mariota was a state track qualifier in the sprinting and jumping events. At the 2010 National Underclassman Combine, he won the camp's "Fastest Man" and "Combine King" awards after running a 4.48-second 40-yard dash. At the 2011 HHSAA T&F Championships, Mariota earned fourth-place finishes in both the 200-meter dash (23.41 s) and the long jump (20 ft, 7 in), while also placing tenth in the 100-meter dash event at 11.63 seconds. He also ran the second leg on the St. Louis 4 × 100 m relay squad, helping them capture the state title with a time of 42.83 seconds.

=== Recruitment ===
Mariota attended an Oregon football camp in the summer of 2010, which allowed Mark Helfrich, Oregon's then offensive coordinator, to be one of the first recruiters to discover Mariota. After the camp, Helfrich visited Mariota in Hawaii to watch the somewhat unrecognized quarterback practice going into his senior season. Helfrich called Chip Kelly during the visit and they made the decision to immediately offer Mariota a scholarship, despite never starting a varsity game.

After his senior season, Mariota was rated the No. 2 recruiting prospect in the state of Hawaii and No. 12 dual-threat quarterback in the nation by Rivals.com. He was recruited by the Oregon Ducks, Hawaii, Memphis, Utah, Oregon State, Washington, Arizona, Notre Dame, UCLA, and USC, but was only offered a scholarship by Memphis and Oregon. He got the offer from Oregon only after the Ducks' first choice, Johnny Manziel, reneged on his scholarship and went to Texas A&M.

College recruiting
Name	Hometown	School	Height	Weight	40^{‡}	Commit date
Marcus Mariota; QB	Honolulu, Hawaii	Saint Louis School	6 ft 4 in (1.93 m)	211 lb (96 kg)	4.5	Oct 30, 2010
Marcus Mariota; QB	Recruit ratings: Scout: Rivals: 247Sports: ESPN:					
Overall recruit ranking: Scout: 24 (QB) Rivals: 24 (QB) ESPN: 71 (QB)
Note: In many cases, Scout, Rivals, 247Sports, On3, and ESPN may conflict in their listings of height and weight.; In these cases, the average was taken. ESPN grades are on a 100-point scale.; Sources: "Oregon Football Commitments". Rivals.; "2011 Oregon Football Commits". Scout.; "ESPN". ESPN.; "Scout.com Team Recruiting Rankings". Scout.; "2011 Team Ranking". Rivals.com.

== College career ==
=== 2012 season ===
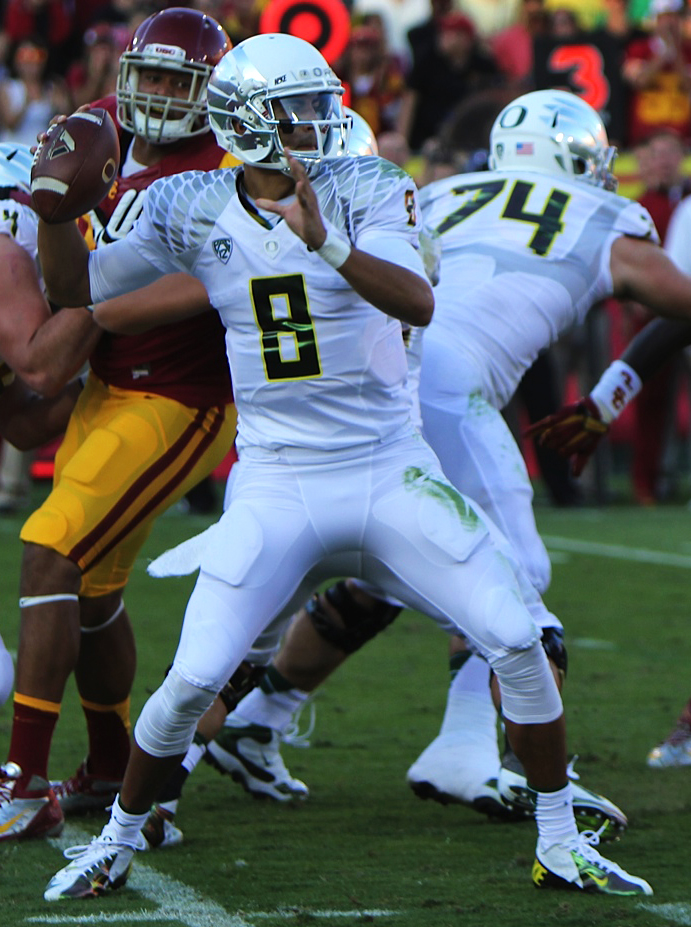
Mariota in 2012

After redshirting the 2011 season, Mariota was showcased in 2012 as the first freshman to start a season opener for the Ducks in 22 seasons. He helped lead Oregon to a 12–1 record and the No. 2 final season ranking while being named All-Pac-12 Conference 1st Team, Pac-12 Freshman Offensive Player of the Year, and earning the 2013 Fiesta Bowl Offensive MVP Award as Mariota guided the Ducks to a 35–17 victory over #5 Kansas State.

Starting in all 13 games, Mariota threw for 2,677 yards on 230-of-336 passing attempts (68.5%), including 32 touchdowns against only six interceptions. He also rushed 106 times for 752 yards (7.1 yards per carry) and five touchdowns. Mariota's athletic versatility was exhibited against Arizona State, when he caught a touchdown, threw a touchdown, and then ran for an 86-yard touchdown, achieving all three scores with 12 minutes still left in the first half.

=== 2013 season ===
Mariota earned Pac-12 All-Conference 1st Team honors for the second consecutive year after setting a Pac-12 record from the end of the 2012 season into the 2013 season by attempting 353 passes without an interception. Starting in all 13 games, he completed 245-of-386 passing attempts (63.5%) for 3,665 yards, 31 touchdowns, and only four interceptions while also rushing for 715 yards (7.4 yards per carry) and nine touchdowns.

Mariota suffered a partial MCL tear against UCLA on October 26, 2013, but continued to play the remainder of the season. After Oregon's 8–0 start, he was featured on the national cover of the November 4 issue of Sports Illustrated as the favorite to win the Heisman Trophy before the No. 2 ranked Ducks fell to No. 6 Stanford on November 7. Despite Oregon's 11–2 season record and top 10 ranking, Mariota's sophomore season was considered a letdown after the Ducks failed to reach a BCS bowl berth for the first time since the 2008 season.

After a loss to Arizona on November 23, Oregon's first loss to an unranked opponent since 2008, Mariota and the Ducks bounced back to narrowly beat rival Oregon State 36–35 in the Civil War. Mariota threw a touchdown pass to Josh Huff with 29 seconds remaining to give Oregon the come-from-behind victory over the Beavers.

Mariota guided the Ducks to their third consecutive bowl victory, beating Texas 30–7 in the 2013 Alamo Bowl while being honored as the game's Offensive MVP after rushing for 133 yards on 15 carries and finishing with 386 total yards. He finished the 2013 season with 4,380 yards of total offense, becoming the only player in Oregon history to eclipse 4,000 yards in a season.

=== 2014 season ===
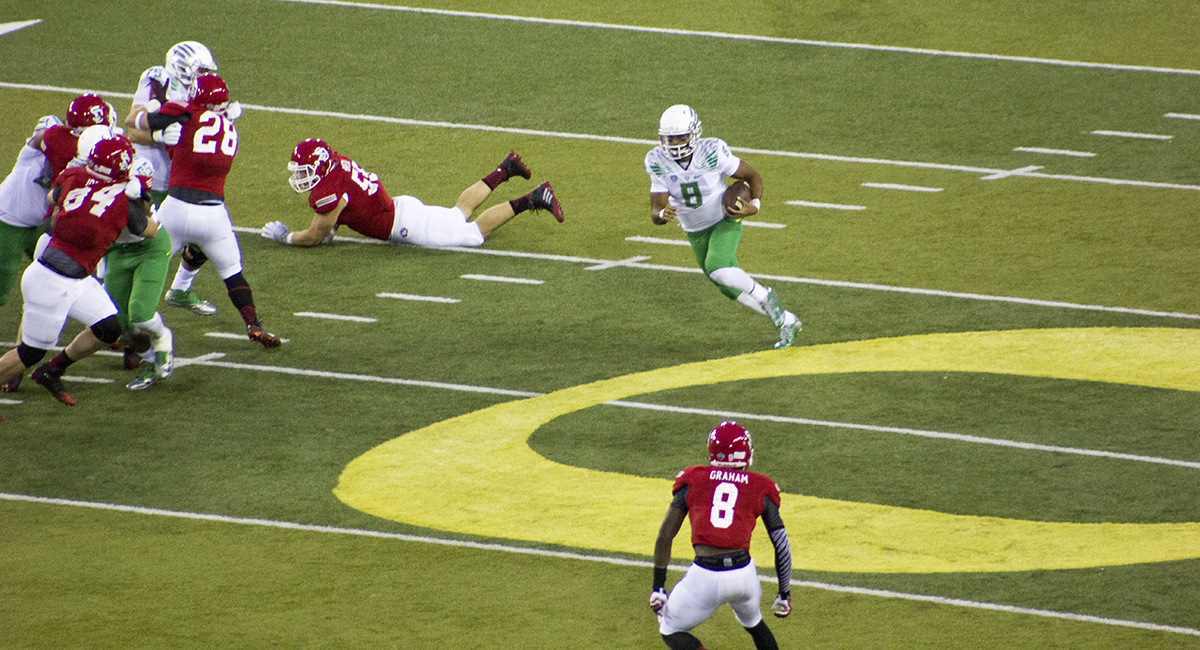
Mariota scrambling against South Dakota in 2014

Prior to the Alamo Bowl on December 30, 2013, Mariota announced his decision to bypass the NFL draft and return for the 2014 season. Considered by many to be a Heisman Trophy favorite entering the 2014 season, Mariota was named to watch lists for the Maxwell Award, Walter Camp Award, and Davey O'Brien Award. Prior to the start of the 2014 season, Mariota was considered one of the best prospects for the NFL Draft.

On December 11, 2014, at the annual College Football Awards show in Orlando, Florida, Mariota won the Davey O'Brien Award for the nation's best quarterback, and the Walter Camp and Maxwell Awards, both awarded to the nation's best football player. The next day back in Eugene, Mariota graduated from the University of Oregon with a bachelor's degree in General Sciences, with an emphasis on human physiology, accomplishing one of his goals in returning to play after the 2013 season.

On December 13, 2014, Mariota became the first Oregon Duck, first Polynesian, and first Hawaii-born athlete to win the Heisman Trophy. He received 788 out of 891 (88.4%) first place votes and 90.9% of the total points.

After a 12–1 regular season record, the Ducks were selected to play in the 2015 Rose Bowl, a College Football Playoff semifinal game, against Florida State and Jameis Winston. Mariota was named the Offensive MVP in the 59–20 victory, after throwing for 338 yards with two passing touchdowns and rushing for 62 yards with one touchdown. With the win, Oregon faced Ohio State in the National Championship and lost, 42–20. Coming into the game, Mariota was set to clinch the all-time lowest interception record, until the final 27 seconds where his last pass of the game was intercepted by cornerback Eli Apple. The loss to the Buckeyes was Mariota's final collegiate game; he entered the 2015 NFL draft a few days later.

In 2016, Oregon unveiled their 30,000 square-foot Marcus Mariota Sports Performance Center.

In 2020, the university conducted a poll of alumni and fans via social media, asking them to select four Oregon alumni for a notional Mount Rushmore for the university. Mariota was one of the top four selections, alongside Nike cofounder and university benefactor Phil Knight, Ducks track legend Steve Prefontaine, and recently graduated basketball superstar Sabrina Ionescu.

== Professional career ==
Pre-draft measurables
Height	Weight	Arm length	Hand span	Wingspan	40-yard dash	10-yard split	20-yard split	20-yard shuttle	Three-cone drill	Vertical jump	Broad jump	Wonderlic
6 ft 3 3/4 in (1.92 m)	222 lb (101 kg)	32 in (0.81 m)	9 7/8 in (0.25 m)	6 ft 4 3/8 in (1.94 m)	4.52 s	1.57 s	2.62 s	4.11 s	6.87 s	36 in (0.91 m)	10 ft 1 in (3.07 m)	33
All values from NFL Combine

=== Tennessee Titans ===
==== 2015 season ====
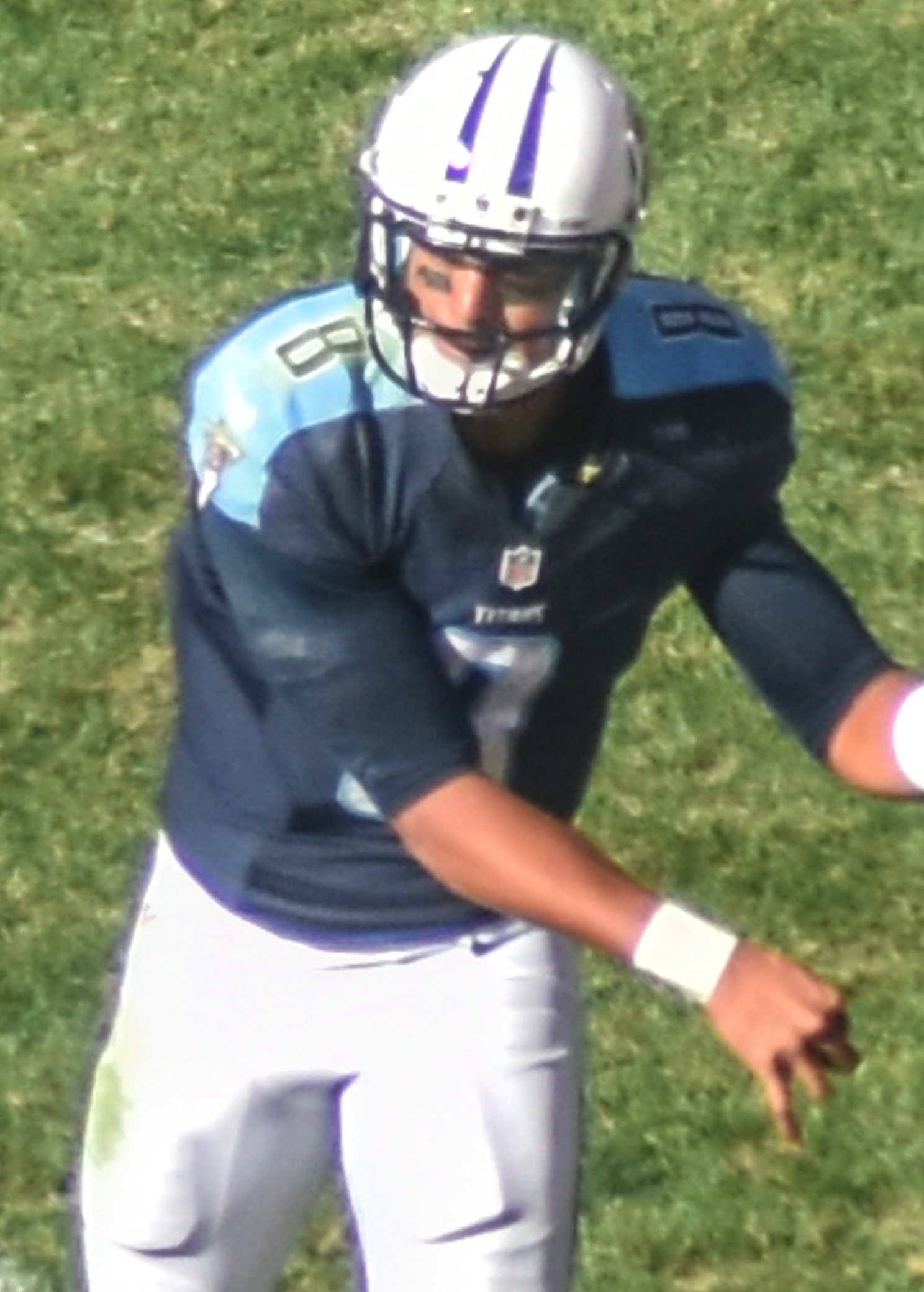
Mariota in 2015

Mariota was selected with the second overall pick in the first round by the Tennessee Titans in the 2015 NFL draft behind Jameis Winston.

In May 2015, Mariota had the best-selling NFL jersey in the league, beating out Winston of the Tampa Bay Buccaneers and Tom Brady of the New England Patriots, who had the second and third highest selling jerseys, respectively. Mariota stated, "It's surreal for me, it's such an honor. "For me it's one of those deals, looking back on it in the future, it's a crazy, crazy deal for sure." Mariota and the Titans agreed to a contract on July 21. This made him the last 2015 first-round pick to be signed and, for the second consecutive year, the Titans were the last team to sign their first-round pick. Mariota signed a four-year, $24,213,974 contract with a $15.9 million signing bonus.

Mariota played in his first career regular-season game during the season-opener against 2015's first overall draft pick Jameis Winston and the Buccaneers. On his fourth career pass attempt, Mariota threw his first NFL touchdown on a 52-yard throw to wide receiver Kendall Wright. Two plays later, Winston threw his first career pass on the next drive, which was intercepted by cornerback Coty Sensabaugh and returned 26 yards for a touchdown. Mariota finished the 42–14 road victory completing 13-of-15 passes for 209 yards and four touchdowns with no interceptions. He also gained a perfect passer rating of 158.3, making Mariota the first quarterback in NFL history to attain a perfect passer rating in his first career start. Mariota also became the first quarterback in NFL history to throw four touchdown passes in the first half of his NFL debut. He is the youngest quarterback to reach the perfect passer rating (21 years, 318 days), surpassing Robert Griffin III. Mariota's performance earned him AFC Offensive Player of the Week for Week 1.

During Week 2 against 2012 Heisman Trophy winner Johnny Manziel and the Cleveland Browns, Mariota completed 21-of-37 passes for 257 yards and two touchdowns in the 28–14 road loss. The following week, Mariota played his first regular season home game against the Indianapolis Colts. Mariota completed 27-of-44 passes for 367 yards with two touchdowns and two interceptions in the narrow 35–33 loss. He set the record as the youngest quarterback since the franchise moved to Tennessee to throw for over 300 yards in a game. Mariota shares the NFL record for most touchdown passes in his first three games (eight) with Mark Rypien.

During Week 9 against the New Orleans Saints, Mariota picked up his second career win after the Titans suffered a six-game losing stretch, as well as his first fourth-quarter/overtime victory in a 34–28 overtime road victory. Mariota threw for a career-high 371 yards and four touchdowns. He also became the first rookie quarterback in NFL history to have two games with four touchdowns and no interceptions, and was named AFC Offensive Player of the Week for his performance.

During a Week 13 victory of 42–39 over the Jacksonville Jaguars, Mariota went 20-of-29, throwing for 268 yards with three touchdowns and an interception. He also rushed for 112 yards on the day, including an 87-yard touchdown run. In the third quarter of the next game against the New York Jets, running back Antonio Andrews threw a 41-yard passing touchdown to Mariota in the wildcat formation. Mariota became the first quarterback in franchise history to catch a touchdown reception. He also became the first NFL player since 1983 (Walter Payton) to pass for a touchdown, rush for a touchdown and catch a touchdown pass of at least 40 yards in the same season. The following week against the Patriots, Mariota completed 3-of-6 passes for 32 yards before leaving the eventual 33–16 road loss in the second quarter with a knee injury. The next day, it was revealed that Mariota was diagnosed with another MCL sprain, and the Titans announced that he would miss the remainder of the season. Zach Mettenberger played in his place to close out the season.

Mariota finished his rookie year with 2,818 passing yards, 19 touchdowns, and 10 interceptions to go along with 34 carries for 252 yards and two touchdowns in 12 games and starts.

==== 2016 season ====
During Week 10 against the Green Bay Packers, Mariota threw for 295 yards and four touchdowns in the 47–25 victory. For his performance, Mariota was named AFC Offensive Player of the Week. Additionally, he was named the AFC Offensive Player of the Month for November after passing for 1,124 yards with 11 touchdowns and two interceptions for a 115.0 passer rating, in addition to rushing for 89 yards and a touchdown. However, during Week 16, Mariota fractured his right fibula in a 38–17 Christmas Eve road loss to the Jaguars. He underwent surgery and missed the regular-season finale against the Houston Texans. The Titans finished 9–7, but missed out on the playoffs for the eighth consecutive year.

Mariota finished the 2016 season with a career-high 3,426 passing yards with 26 touchdowns and nine interceptions, to go along with 60 carries, a career-high 349 rushing yards and two touchdowns. Mariota was also ranked 50th by his peers on the NFL Top 100 Players of 2017 and was named a Pro Bowl first alternate.

==== 2017 season ====
On September 10, 2017, against the Oakland Raiders in the season opener, Mariota recorded a rushing touchdown in the first quarter for the Titans' first points of the 2017 season. He finished the 26–16 loss with 25-of-41 passes for 256 yards and totaled three rushes for 26 yards and a touchdown. Three weeks later against the Texans, Mariota was limited to 96 passing yards and two interceptions, while also rushing for 39 yards and two touchdowns, before leaving the eventual 57–14 road loss with a hamstring injury. Mariota missed the next game against the Miami Dolphins, but returned the following week against the Indianapolis Colts and led the Titans to a 36–22 victory. In the regular season finale, with a playoff berth on the line, Mariota and the Titans faced the AFC South Champion, the Jaguars (in Week 2, the Titans won their matchup on the road 37–16.) Mariota successfully completed that game to win 15–10, and locked up the #5 seed in the playoffs after the Baltimore Ravens lost to the Cincinnati Bengals later that day. The win also gave Tennessee their first postseason berth since 2008.

Mariota finished the regular season with 3,232 passing yards, 13 touchdowns, and 15 interceptions, to go along with 60 carries for 312 yards and five touchdowns.

Making his first career postseason appearance, Mariota and the Titans went on the road to face the AFC West Champion, the Kansas City Chiefs. In their last matchup (Week 15 of the 2016 season), the Titans narrowly won 19–17 off a field goal by former Chief placekicker Ryan Succop. In the Wild Card Round, Mariota became only the second player (the first was Brad Johnson in the regular season) in NFL history, and the first quarterback in the playoffs, to catch his own pass for a touchdown after it was batted back to him by cornerback Darrelle Revis. The Titans narrowly won 22–21, on a great comeback after being down 21–3 at halftime, for their first playoff win since the 2003 season. The team's postseason run ended in the Divisional Round against the Patriots. In the 35–14 road loss, Mariota threw for 254 yards and two touchdowns and rushed for 37 yards, but was sacked eight times.

==== 2018 season ====
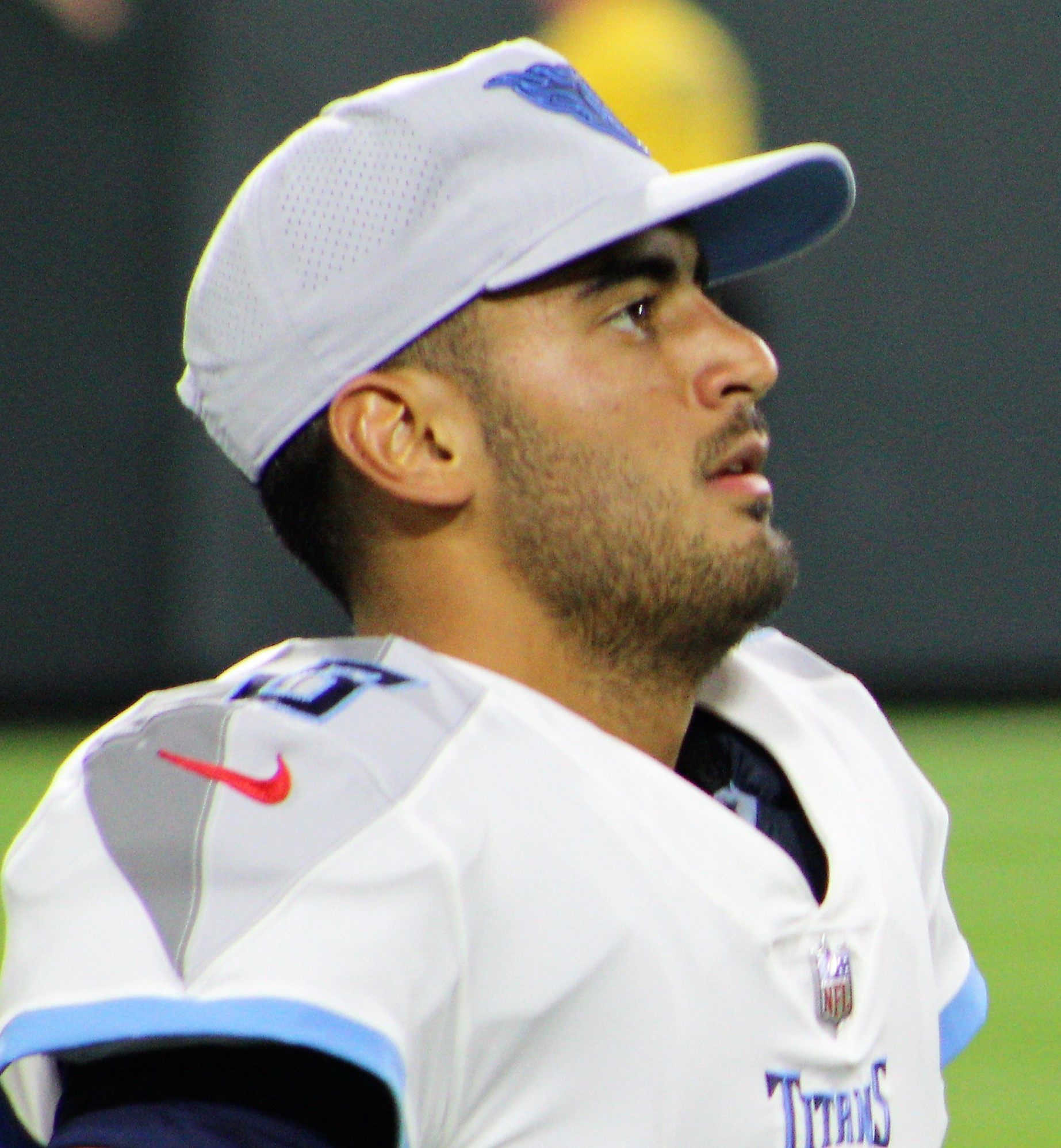
Mariota in 2018

On April 18, 2018, the Titans picked up the fifth-year option on Mariota's contract.

In the season-opener against the Dolphins, Mariota was limited to 103 passing yards and 15 rushing yards before leaving the eventual 27–20 road loss with an elbow injury. He missed Week 2 against the Texans due to injury, and Blaine Gabbert was named the starter. During a Week 3 road victory of 9–6 over the Jaguars, Mariota came in to relieve Gabbert, who suffered a concussion. Mariota completed 12-of-18 passes for 100 yards and rushed for 51 yards. In the next game, Mariota returned to the starting lineup to face the Super Bowl LII champion Philadelphia Eagles. He completed 30-of-43 passes for 344 yards, two passing touchdowns, and an interception to go along with 46 rushing yards and a touchdown. Mariota led the Titans back from a 14-point deficit to an eventual 26–23 overtime victory, earning him AFC Offensive Player of the Week honors. Two weeks later against the Baltimore Ravens, Mariota was sacked 11 times (the most for a quarterback since Greg McElroy in 2012) in a 21–0 loss.

Following a Week 8 bye, Mariota made his second appearance on Monday Night Football as the Titans defeated the Dallas Cowboys on the road 28–14. He threw for 240 yards and two passing touchdowns, while also rushing for 32 yards and a rushing touchdown, to improve to 2–0 as a starter on Monday Night Football. In Week 10 against the Patriots, Mariota led the Titans to a 34–10 victory, marking the team's first victory over the Patriots since 2002. He threw for 228 yards and two touchdowns, rushed for 21 yards, and caught a pass for 21 yards. Two weeks later against the Texans, Mariota successfully completed his first 19 passes, as well as throwing for 303 yards and two touchdowns. He finished the 34–17 road loss completing 22-of-23 passes for a completion percentage of 95.7. During Week 16 against the Washington Redskins, Mariota was limited to 110 passing yards and seven rushing yards before leaving the eventual 25–16 victory with a temporary injury to the nerves in the neck/shoulder area (also known as a stinger.) Without Mariota and with the playoffs in contention for the regular-season finale, Gabbert led the Titans in a loss to the Colts. The team finished 9–7 for the third consecutive year and missed out on the playoffs.

Mariota finished the 2018 season with a career-low 11 touchdowns, eight interceptions, and a career-low 2,528 passing yards. However, he rushed for a career-high 357 yards and two touchdowns.

==== 2019 season ====
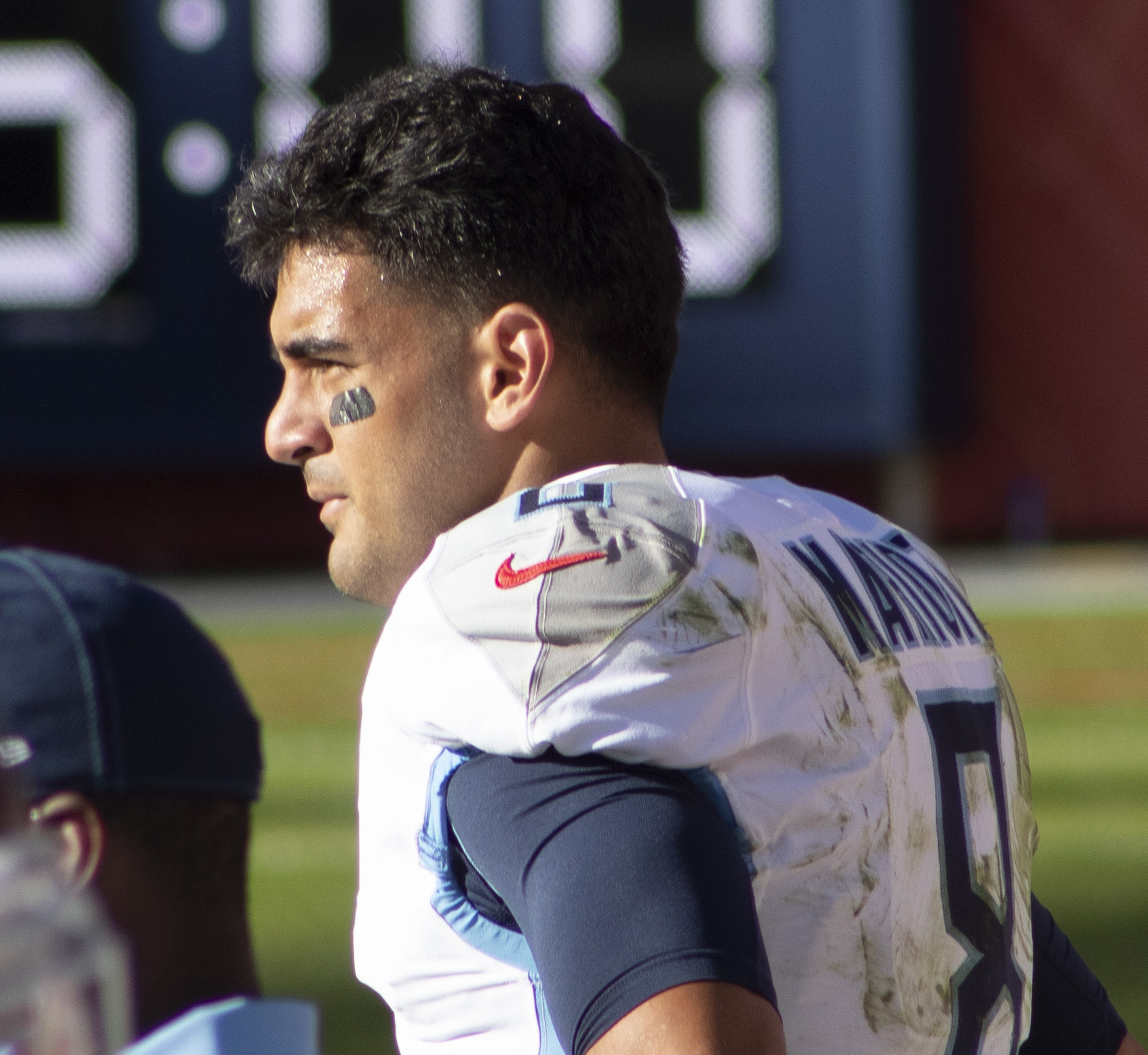
Mariota in 2019

During the season-opening 43–13 road victory over the Browns, Mariota threw for 248 yards and three touchdowns. Three weeks later against the Atlanta Falcons, he had 227 passing yards and three touchdowns in the 24–10 road victory.

During a Week 6 16–0 shutout road loss to the Denver Broncos, Mariota was benched in the third quarter in favor of Ryan Tannehill with the Titans trailing 13–0 after throwing for 63 yards and two interceptions. The following week against the Los Angeles Chargers, Tannehill was named the starter with Mariota serving as backup. He remained the backup for the rest of the season. In the regular-season finale against the Texans, which resulted in a 35–14 road victory, Mariota came in to throw a single pass, which was a 24-yard connection to rookie wide receiver A. J. Brown that put him over 1,000 receiving yards on the season. Tannehill led the Titans to a 7–3 record (9–7 overall), securing them a playoff berth.

During the Wild Card Round against the Patriots, Mariota completed a four-yard pass to MyCole Pruitt in the first quarter of the 20–13 road victory. Two weeks later in the AFC Championship Game against the Chiefs, Mariota came in during the second quarter of the 35–24 road loss and had a five-yard rush.

On March 15, 2020, the Titans signed Tannehill to a long-term extension, signaling the end of Mariota's five-year tenure in Tennessee.

=== Las Vegas Raiders ===
==== 2020 season ====
On March 16, 2020, Mariota signed a two-year, $17.6 million contract with the Las Vegas Raiders to serve as Derek Carr's backup.

Mariota was placed on injured reserve on September 7. He was designated to return from injured reserve on September 30 and began practicing with the team again. Mariota was activated on October 20.

Mariota made his Raiders' debut in the first quarter of the Week 15 matchup against the Chargers after Carr left the eventual 30–27 overtime loss with a groin injury. Mariota finished the game completing 17-of-28 passes for 226 yards, a touchdown, and an interception, while also rushing for 88 yards and a touchdown.

==== 2021 season ====
After being brought in for a designed play during the season-opener against the Ravens, Mariota suffered a quad injury and was placed on injured reserve on September 18, 2021. He was activated on October 16.

Throughout the season, Mariota was used frequently as a gadget quarterback, entering games to run or hand off the football.

=== Atlanta Falcons ===
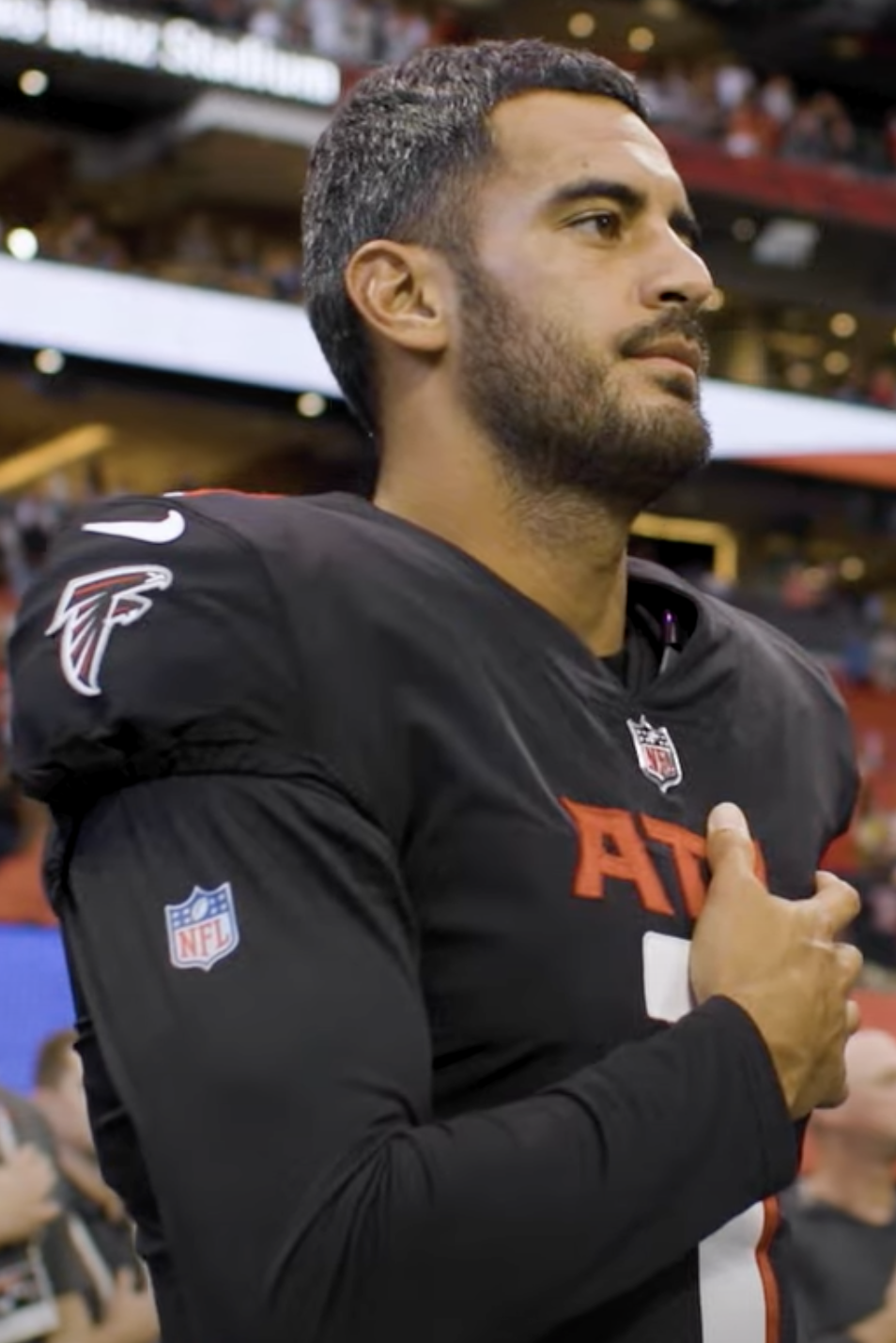
Mariota in 2022

On March 21, 2022, Mariota signed a two-year, $18.75 million deal with the Atlanta Falcons after Atlanta traded longtime starter Matt Ryan to the Indianapolis Colts.

On July 28, Mariota was named the Falcons' starting quarterback after competing for the job with rookie Desmond Ridder in the offseason. In the season opener against the New Orleans Saints, Mariota threw for 215 yards and rushed for 72 yards and a touchdown during the narrow 27–26 loss. During a Week 6 28–14 victory over the San Francisco 49ers, he completed 13-for-14 passes for 129 yards and two touchdowns while also rushing for 50 yards and a touchdown. Mariota was named NFC Offensive Player of the Week for his performance. Two weeks later against the Carolina Panthers, Mariota completed 20-of-28 passes for 253 yards, three touchdowns, and two interceptions in the 37–34 overtime victory.

On December 8, Mariota was benched in favor of Ridder for the Falcons' Week 15 rematch against the Saints. Mariota was placed on injured reserve with a knee injury six days later. In the 2022 season, he appeared in 13 games, throwing for 2,219 yards, 15 touchdowns, and nine interceptions, to go along with a career-high 438 rushing yards and four touchdowns.

In a move to save cap space, Mariota was released on February 28, 2023.

=== Philadelphia Eagles ===
On March 20, 2023, Mariota signed a one-year, $5 million deal with the Philadelphia Eagles.

In a backup role to Jalen Hurts, Mariota appeared in three games. He threw for a touchdown and an interception, both of which came in Week 18 against the Giants.

=== Washington Commanders ===
==== 2024 season ====
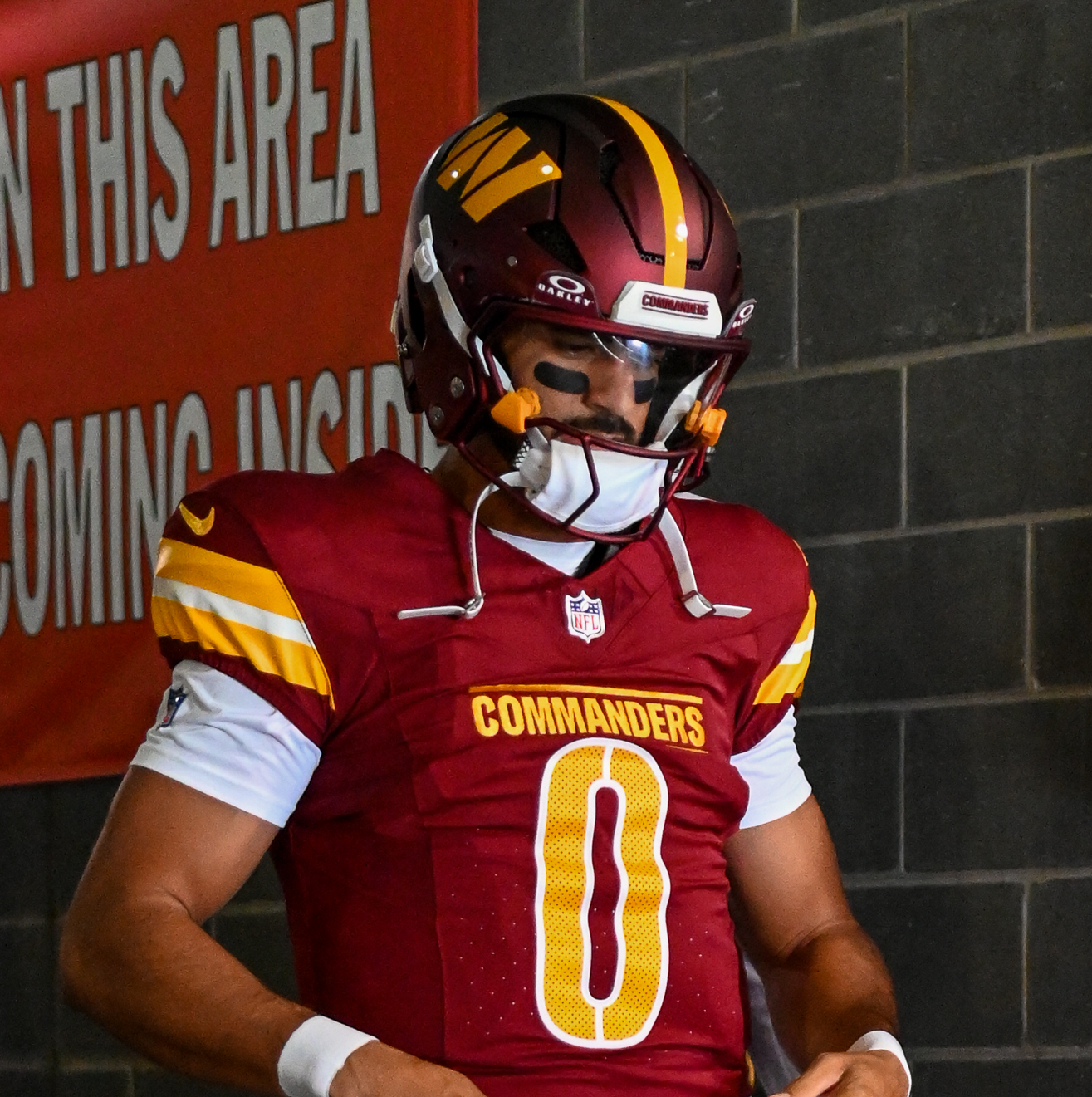
Mariota in 2024

On March 14, 2024, Mariota signed a one-year deal with the Washington Commanders. He briefly wore 0 as his jersey number, the first quarterback in NFL history to do so, before changing to 18 after training camp. The Commanders' first round selection (second overall, as Mariota had been) in the 2024 NFL draft was quarterback Jayden Daniels, who was named the starter for the season. Mariota was named third-string quarterback to start the season behind Jeff Driskel.

On September 7, Mariota was placed on injured reserve after straining his pectoral muscle in practice. He was activated on October 5. During Week 7 against the Carolina Panthers, Daniels suffered a rib injury and Mariota entered the game, where he completed 18-of-23 passes for 205 yards and two touchdowns in the 40–7 victory. During the regular-season finale against the Dallas Cowboys, Mariota replaced Daniels to start the second half as Dallas led 9–3. Despite one drive in the fourth quarter where Mariota was sacked twice and forced to punt, the Commanders scored three touchdowns for a 23–19 comeback road victory. The last drive resulted in a five-yard touchdown pass to wide receiver Terry McLaurin with two seconds remaining.

Daniels started each of the Commanders' postseason games, with Mariota making no appearances. Their postseason run ended with a 55–23 loss for the NFC Championship to division rival Philadelphia Eagles, who would go on to win Super Bowl LIX.

==== 2025 season ====
On March 13, 2025, Mariota re-signed with the Commanders on a one-year, $8 million contract.

During Week 3 against the Las Vegas Raiders, Mariota started in place of an injured Jayden Daniels, where he completed 15-of-21 passes for 207 yards and a touchdown in the 41–24 victory. During Week 8 against the Kansas City Chiefs, Mariota once again started in place of Daniels, where he completed 21-of-30 passes for 213 yards, a touchdown, and two interceptions in the 28–7 road loss. Daniels was later ruled out for the season after Week 14, and Mariota was named the starter.

==== 2026 season ====
On March 11, 2026, Mariota re-signed with the Commanders on a one-year, $7 million contract with a maximum value of $11 million based on incentives. In the team's first preseason game against the Miami Dolphins, he left in the Commanders' first offensive drive after suffering a MCL sprain in his right knee.

On September 25, it was announced by head coach Dan Quinn that Mariota would be the starter for the games Daniels would miss as a result of his left elbow injury. Before Daniels returned, Mariota started in three games, totaling 340 yards for four touchdowns and 0 interceptions on a 64.7% completion rate.

== Career statistics ==
Legend
	Led the league
**Bold**	Career high

=== NFL ===
==== Regular season ====
Year	Team	Games			Passing									Rushing					Sacks		Fumbles	
Year	Team	GP	GS	Record	Cmp	Att	Pct	Yds	Y/A	Lng	TD	Int	Rtg	Att	Yds	Avg	Lng	TD	Sck	Yds	Fum	Lost
2015	TEN	12	12	3–9	230	370	62.2	2,818	7.6	61	19	10	91.5	34	252	7.4	**87**	2	38	**258**	**10**	**6**
2016	TEN	15	15	8–7	276	451	61.2	**3,426**	7.6	60	**26**	9	95.6	60	349	5.8	41	2	23	156	9	5
2017	TEN	15	15	**9–6**	**281**	**453**	62.0	3,232	7.1	**75**	13	**15**	79.3	60	312	5.2	34	**5**	27	173	2	1
2018	TEN	14	13	7–6	228	331	68.9	2,528	7.6	61	11	8	92.3	64	357	5.6	27	2	**42**	243	9	2
2019	TEN	7	6	2–4	95	160	59.4	1,203	7.5	**75**	7	2	92.3	24	129	5.4	15	0	25	162	3	0
2020	LV	1	0	—	17	28	60.7	226	8.1	35	1	1	83.3	9	88	**9.8**	26	1	0	0	0	0
2021	LV	10	0	—	1	2	50.0	4	2.0	4	0	0	56.3	13	87	6.7	31	1	0	0	1	0
2022	ATL	13	13	5–8	184	300	61.3	2,219	7.4	**75**	15	9	88.2	**85**	**438**	5.2	30	4	28	195	8	3
2023	PHI	3	0	—	15	23	65.2	164	7.1	22	1	1	82.5	8	52	6.5	17	0	3	11	1	1
2024	WAS	3	0	—	34	44	**77.3**	364	**8.3**	29	4	0	**131.2**	18	92	5.1	33	1	3	29	0	0
2025	WAS	11	8	2–6	139	227	61.2	1,695	7.5	56	10	7	86.1	50	297	5.9	44	1	16	107	6	1
2026	WAS	3	2	1–1	33	51	64.7	340	6.7	35	4	0	109.9	7	49	7.0	35	0	3	13	0	0
Career		107	84	37–47	1,533	2,440	62.8	18,219	7.5	75	111	62	90.1	432	2,502	5.8	87	19	208	1,347	50	19

==== Postseason ====
Year	Team	Games			Passing									Rushing					Sacks		Fumbles	
Year	Team	GP	GS	Record	Cmp	Att	Pct	Yds	Y/A	Lng	TD	Int	Rtg	Att	Yds	Avg	Lng	TD	Sck	Yds	Fum	Lost
2017	TEN	2	2	1–1	**41**	**68**	60.3	**459**	**6.8**	**36**	**4**	**1**	**93.9**	**12**	**83**	**6.9**	**17**	0	**10**	**62**	0	0
2019	TEN	3	0	—	1	1	**100.0**	4	4.0	4	0	0	83.3	1	5	5.0	5	0	0	0	0	0
2021	LV	1	0	—	0	0	—	0	—	0	0	0	—	0	0	—	0	0	0	0	0	0
2023	PHI	1	0	—	0	0	—	0	—	0	0	0	—	0	0	—	0	0	0	0	0	0
2024	WAS	3	0	—	0	0	—	0	—	0	0	0	—	2	1	0.5	2	0	0	0	0	0
Career		10	2	1–1	42	69	60.9	463	6.7	36	4	1	94.1	15	89	5.9	17	0	10	62	0	0

=== College ===
Season	Games			Passing								Rushing			
Season	GP	GS	Record	Comp	Att	Pct	Yards	Avg	TD	Int	Rate	Att	Yards	Avg	TD
2011	Redshirt														
2012	13	13	**12–1**	230	336	**68.5**^{2}	2,677	8.0	32	**6**	163.2^{2}	106	752^{4}	7.1	5
2013	13	13	11–2	245	386	63.5	3,665	9.5^{2}	31	4	167.7^{2}	96	715	**7.4**^{2}	9
2014	15	15	13–2	**304**	**445**	68.3	**4,454**^{2}	**10.0**^{1}	**42**^{2}	4	**181.7**^{1}	**135**	**770**^{4}	5.7^{4}	**15**^{4}
Career	41	41	36–5	779	1,167	66.8	10,796	9.3	105	14	171.8	337	2,237	6.6	29

- ^{1} – NCAA Leader
- ^{2} – Pac-12 Leader
- ^{3} – NCAA Leader (QB)
- ^{4} – Pac-12 Leader (QB)

== Career highlights ==
=== Awards and honors ===
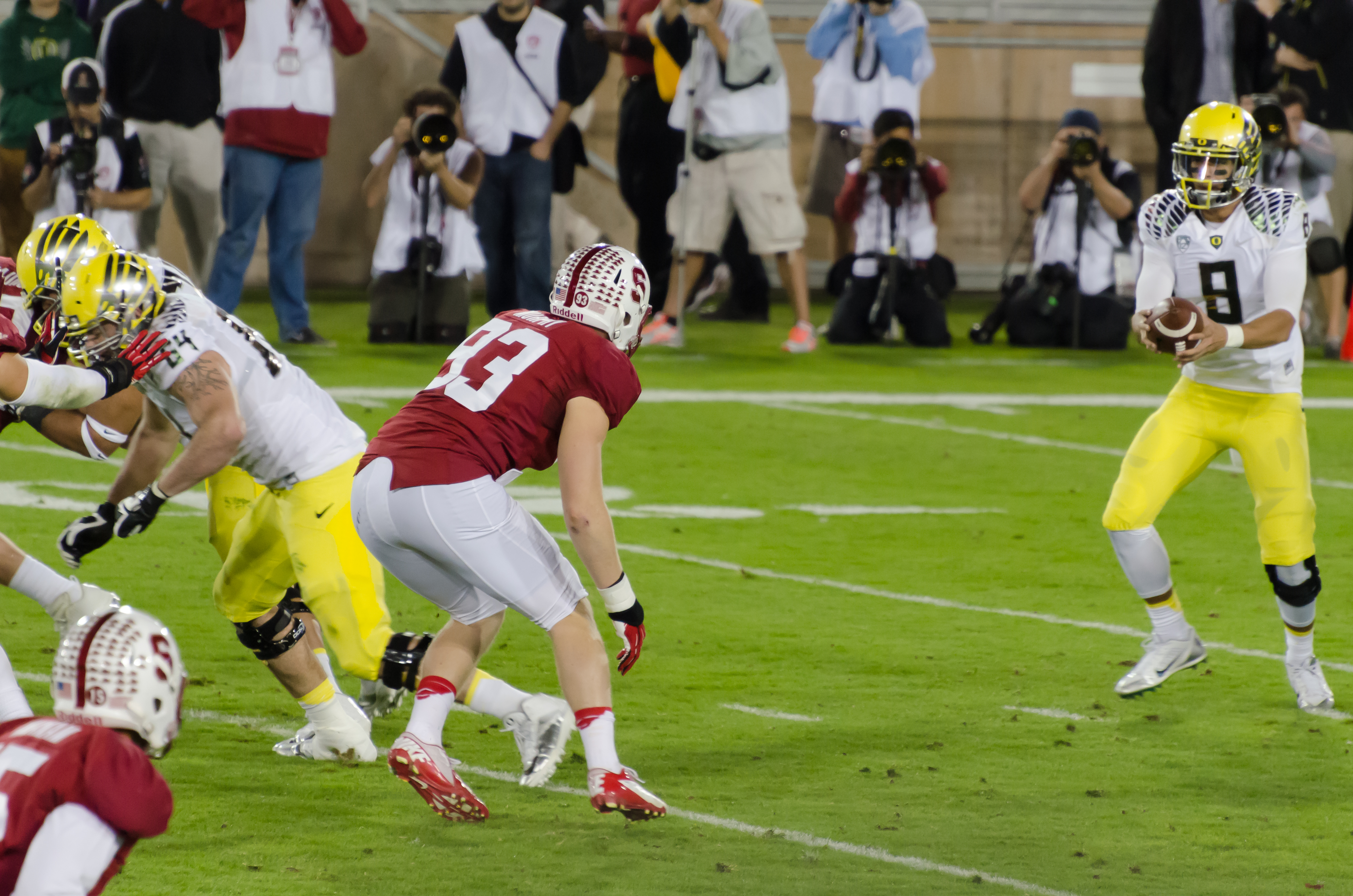
Mariota (right) against Stanford

==== NFL ====
- Ranked No. 50 in the Top 100 Players of 2017

==== College ====
2012

- Pac-12 Offensive Freshman of the Year
- Pac-12 All-Conference 1st Team (Pac-12 Coaches, ESPN.com, Phil Steele)
- Pac-12 Academic All-Conference Honorable Mention
- Honorable Mention All-America (SI.com)
- Manning Award Finalist
- Team's Most Outstanding Player (Skeie's Award)
- Fiesta Bowl Offensive MVP (January 3, 2013)

2013

- Pac-12 All-Conference 1st Team (Pac-12 Coaches, Phil Steele)
- Sports Illustrated Cover, August 19
- Pac-12 Offensive Player of the Week (Pac-12 Coaches) October 7
- Walter Camp National Offensive Player of the Week, October 13
- Pac-12 Offensive Player of the Week (Pac-12 Coaches) October 14
- Sports Illustrated Cover, November 4
- Team's Most Outstanding Player (Skeie's Award)
- Team's Most Inspirational Player (Wilford Gonyea Award)
- Alamo Bowl Offensive MVP
- CFPA Quarterback Trophy Winner

2014

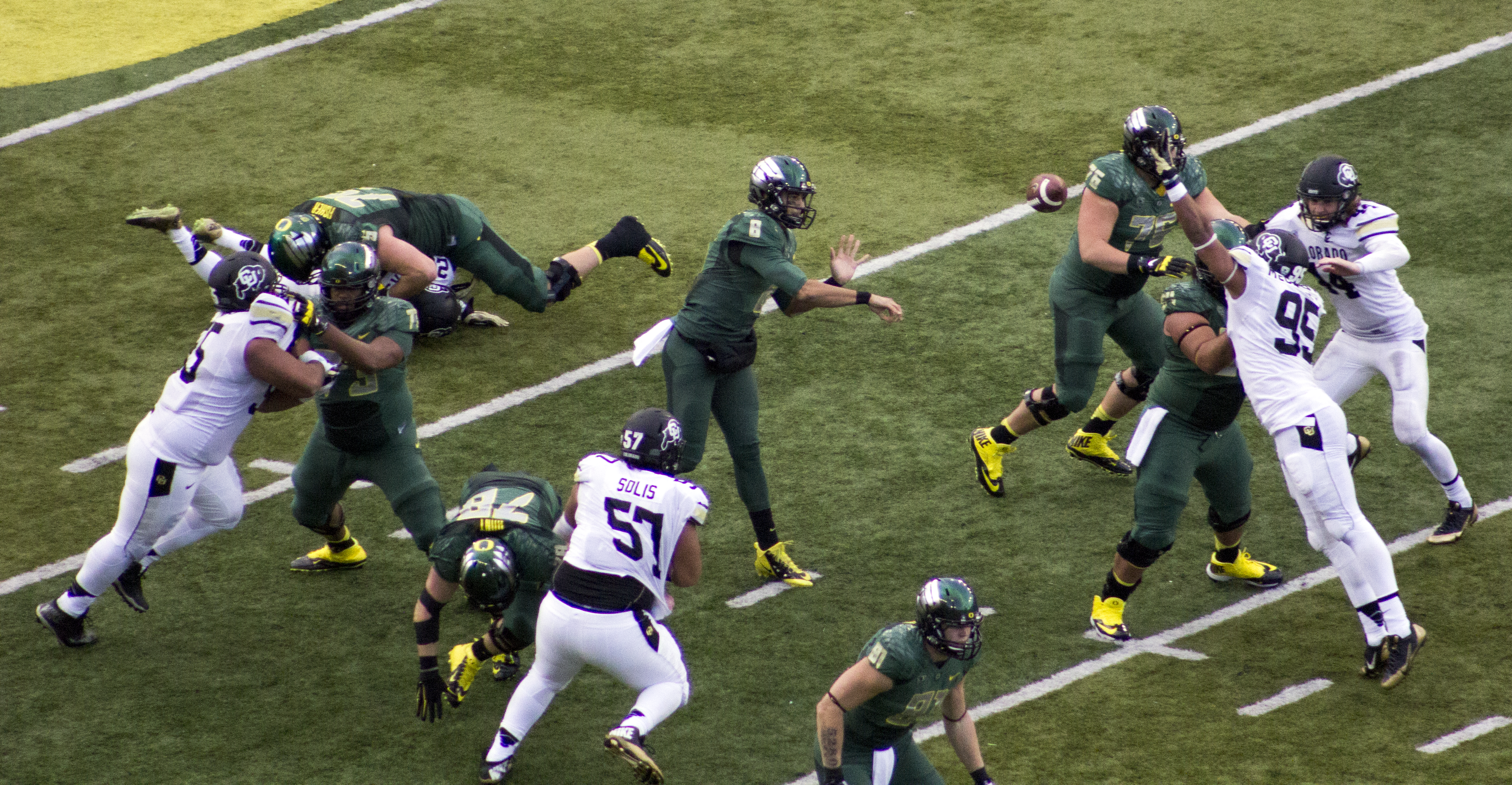
Mariota in the pocket against Colorado

- Athlon Sports National Player of the Week September 7
- Walter Camp National Offensive Player of the Week September 7
- Pac-12 Offensive Player of the Week (Pac-12 Coaches) September 8
- Davey O'Brien Quarterback of the Week September 9
- Sports Illustrated Cover, September 22
- Senior Bowl National Offensive Player of the Week October 20
- Pac-12 Offensive Player of the Week (Pac-12 Coaches) October 27
- Pac-12 Offensive Player of the Week (Pac-12 Coaches) November 3
- Team's Most Outstanding Player (Skeie's Award)
- Team's Most Inspirational Player (Wilford Gonyea Award)†
- Pac-12 Offensive Player of the Year (Pac-12 Coaches)
- Pac-12 All-Conference 1st Team (Pac-12 Coaches)
- Pac-12 Championship Game MVP
- NCAA passer rating leader
- Johnny Unitas Golden Arm Award
- Polynesian College Football Player of the Year
- Davey O'Brien Award
- Walter Camp Award
- Walter Camp All-America Team
- Maxwell Award
- Heisman Trophy
- Associated Press Player of the Year
- Sports Illustrated Cover, December 29
- Rose Bowl Offensive MVP (January 1, 2015)
- Manning Award
- Unanimous All-American

†Shared award

==== High school ====
- 2010 HHSAA Division 1 State Football Championship
- 2010 Interscholastic League of Honolulu Offensive Player of the Year
- 2010 PrepStar Magazine All-West Region
- 2010 Hawaii Gatorade Player of the Year

=== Records ===
==== NFL records ====
- Most passing touchdowns by a rookie quarterback in one half: 4 (tied with Jameis Winston and Deshaun Watson) (September 13, 2015)
- First player in NFL history to pass for at least 250 yards with three touchdowns and rush for more than 100 yards in the same game
- Second rookie in NFL history to throw at least four touchdown passes in a season opener
- First quarterback in NFL history to record six total touchdown passes within the first two games of his career
- First player in the Super Bowl era with a perfect passer rating in first NFL start
- First player to have both a receiving and passing touchdown in a playoff game
- First player to throw a touchdown pass to himself in the playoffs
- Sixteen games with at least two touchdown passes in his first two NFL seasons (tied with Peyton Manning and Russell Wilson)
- First rookie to have two games with four touchdown passes and no interceptions
- First quarterback in NFL history to throw four touchdown passes in the first half of his NFL debut

==== Titans franchise records ====
- Most passing touchdowns in a season by a rookie: 19
- Most rushing yards in a game by a quarterback: 112
- Longest run by a quarterback: 87 yards
- First quarterback to catch a touchdown reception
- First player to throw a touchdown pass to himself
- First rookie to start at quarterback in Week 1
- Highest season completion percentage by a rookie: 62.2
- Highest single game completion percentage: 95.7
- Most Completions (game, as a rookie): 28 (November 8, 2015, against the New Orleans Saints)
- Most Passing Yards (game, as a rookie): 371 (November 8, 2015, against the New Orleans Saints)
- Most Passing TDs (game, as a rookie): 4 (September 13, 2015, against the Tampa Bay Buccaneers and November 8, 2015, against the New Orleans Saints)
- Best Passer Rating (game, as a rookie): 158.3 (September 13, 2015, against the Tampa Bay Buccaneers)
- Most Yds/Pass Att (game, as a rookie): 13.93 (September 13, 2015, against the Tampa Bay Buccaneers)

==== College records ====
Pac-12 Conference

- Career total touchdowns, 135
- Single season total touchdowns, 58 (2014)
- Freshman passing touchdowns, 32 (2012)
- Passes attempted without an interception, 353 (2012–2013)

Oregon

- Career total offensive yards, 13,089 yards
- Career passing yards, 10,796
- Career passing touchdowns, 105 TD
- Single season passing yards, 4,454 yards (2014)
- Single season passing touchdowns, 42 (2014)
- Single game passing touchdowns, 6 TD (2012, at California)
- Source: Oregon Ducks Football Media Guide

== Personal life ==
Mariota married his college sweetheart, Kiyomi Cook, on July 1, 2021. They had their first child, Makaia, the following year.

Mariota was one of three quarterbacks, along with Patrick Mahomes and Kirk Cousins, documented on and off the field during the 2022 season for the Netflix and NFL Films series Quarterback, which debuted in July 2023.

The Mariotas have a foundation called Motiv8, which works to provide sports and healthy lifestyle programming to children.
