= Millwood Public Schools (Oklahoma) =

School district in Oklahoma

Location
- 6724 N Martin Luther King Ave; Oklahoma City, Oklahoma 73111 Oklahoma County United States of America

District information
- Type: Public, Primary, Secondary, Co-Educational
- Grades: Elementary Pre-K-5; Middle School 6–8; High School 9–12
- Superintendent: Cecilia Robinson-Woods, Ph.D.
- Schools: 3
- Budget: $10,594,000
- NCES District ID: 4020080

Students and staff
- Students: 1,026
- Teachers: 56
- Staff: 31
- Student–teacher ratio: 18:1

Other information
- Website: www.millwoodps.org

Millwood High School

Location
- 6718 North Martin Luther King Avenue; Oklahoma City, (Oklahoma County), Oklahoma 73111; United States
- Coordinates: 35.543289°N 97.476547°W

Information
- Type: Public high school
- Principal: Patrice Cannon
- Staff: 17.08 (FTE)
- Enrollment: 332 (2023-24)
- Student to teacher ratio: 19.44
- Colors: Blue and white
- Nickname: Falcons

Millwood Public Schools is a PK-12 district with an enrollment of approximately 1026 students in Oklahoma City, Oklahoma. The district is located in the Northeast part of the city, and covers an area of 10.5 square miles (27 km^{2}).

== History ==
The original school site in the area now known as Millwood was the Deep Fork School, established in 1898. A 168-acre plot of land that comprises the present-day district was donated by J.M. Cramer. The original intent of the land was to develop a cotton mill by a South Carolina firm, but was not fully realized. A one room school building existed on the land that was originally intended for the mill, and due to the surrounding wooded area, the eventual school district was known as Millwood.

In 1918, the school board traded the original site for another 2.5-acre (10,000 m^{2}) tract (which is located near the present spot of the Millwood Middle School Building) and a new three-room, two-story rock building was built. In 1935, with WPA labor, a large two-story rock building was built, complete with a principal's office, classrooms, cafeteria, and auditorium. Kindergarten was started in 1949 on a tuition basis, and in 1951, kindergarten was included in the regular school program. The student body is primarily made up of African-American students (80%).

In 1956 Millwood consisted of Kindergarten through 8th grade with about 25 students in each grade. Like a lot of schools in those days, Millwood was segregated with an all white faculty and students until 1963-64. By 1962 attendance had more than doubled, and the school was an athletic power even back then. From 1960 to 1962 the basketball team was undefeated for three seasons, dominating conference members Pleasant Hill, Crutcho, Harrison and others and in 1962 defeated Casady's 8th grade team twice.

In 1960 a new building which included 11 classrooms, library, new offices, kitchen, lounge, and cafeteria, was added at a cost of $275,000. Six new 72-passenger buses were purchased in 1963, along with a plan to expand the existing facilities and to add a ninth grade. The curriculum required additional facilities, including a home economics room, drafting and manual arts room, and two classrooms.

During the spring of 1971, a special election was held for the purpose of establishing an independent school district with the addition of a new high school for grades 10-12. The high school was accredited the year of operation and held its first graduation in 1972 with 16 students.

=== Surrounding Community and District Tax Base ===
The ad-valorem tax base is primarily residential property and the land surrounding Remington Park, which contains such non-taxable properties as the National Cowboy and Western Heritage Museum, the Oklahoma City Zoo, the Omniplex Science Museum, the National Softball Hall of Fame, the Oklahoma State Firefighter Museum, and the land on which Remington Park is built.

== Recent developments ==
A preschool program was added in 1980, and computer education programs were added in 1982. A pre-kindergarten program was added to the primary school in 1995. In 1996, the fifth grade was moved from the middle school to the primary school, which was then changed to an elementary school with grades pre-kindergarten through five. The sixth grade was moved from the middle school in the fall of 2002.

Millwood initiated a pilot program in arts education in the 2003-2004 school year, in which an integrated arts curriculum with opportunities in the areas of visual and performing arts were available to students. The pilot developed into the Millwood Elementary School Arts Academy (MESAA), opening for the 2006-2007 school year. The district passed a bond issue in 2018 to raise $18 million for school construction, repairs and transportation equipment.

== List of schools ==
- Millwood Elementary Learning Academy
- Millwood Arts Academy
- Millwood High School

== Noted alumni ==
- Joe Carter – professional major league baseball player for the Toronto Blue Jays.
- Susie Berning – professional golfer
- Ellis Edwards – former Oklahoma State Treasurer
- Vonley R Royal - Oklahoma State Regents for Higher Education Chief Information Officer
- Kevin Samuels - life and style coach, YouTube creator.
- Anthony Williams - record producer, multi-instrumentalist, cousin of Kanye West.
- Bryan White - Grammy, CMA, ACM award-winning multiplatinum country music artist
- Marcus Major - Running back, University of Oklahoma football team and University of Minnesota
