= 2013 Alabama Crimson Tide football team =

American college football season

2013 Alabama Crimson Tide football

SEC Western Division co-champion

Sugar Bowl, L 31–45 vs. Oklahoma
- Conference: Southeastern Conference
- Western Division

Ranking
- Coaches: No. 8
- AP: No. 7
- Record: 11–2 (7–1 SEC)
- Head coach: Nick Saban (7th season)
- Offensive coordinator: Doug Nussmeier (2nd season)
- Offensive scheme: Pro-style, multiple, two-back
- Defensive coordinator: Kirby Smart (6th season)
- Base defense: 3–4
- MVP: C. J. Mosley
- Captains: A. J. McCarron; C. J. Mosley; Kevin Norwood
- Home stadium: Bryant–Denny Stadium

2013 Southeastern Conference football standings
	Conf.			Overall
Team	W		L	W		L
Eastern Division
No. 5 Missouri x	7	–	1	12	–	2
No. 4 South Carolina	6	–	2	11	–	2
Georgia	5	–	3	8	–	5
No. 24 Vanderbilt	4	–	4	9	–	4
Florida	3	–	5	4	–	8
Tennessee	2	–	6	5	–	7
Kentucky	0	–	8	2	–	10
Western Division
No. 2 Auburn xy$	7	–	1	12	–	2
No. 7 Alabama x%	7	–	1	11	–	2
No. 14 LSU *	5	–	3	10	–	3
No. 18 Texas A&M	4	–	4	9	–	4
Mississippi State	3	–	5	7	–	6
Ole Miss *	3	–	5	8	–	5
Arkansas	0	–	8	3	–	9
Championship: Auburn 59, Missouri 42
$ – BCS representative as conference champion; % – BCS at-large representative; x – Division champion/co-champions; y – Championship game participant; * LSU and Ole Miss vacated all wins (except for Ole Miss' Music City Bowl win) due to NCAA violations.; Rankings from AP Poll

The 2013 Alabama Crimson Tide football team represented the University of Alabama in the 2013 NCAA Division I FBS football season. It was the Crimson Tide's 119th overall season, 80th as a member of the Southeastern Conference (SEC) and its 22nd within the SEC Western Division. The team was led by head coach Nick Saban, in his seventh year, and played its home games at Bryant–Denny Stadium in Tuscaloosa, Alabama. They finished the season with a record of eleven wins and two losses (11–2 overall, 7–1 in the SEC) and with a loss in the 2014 Sugar Bowl to Oklahoma.

After they captured the 2012 national championship, the Crimson Tide signed a highly rated recruiting class in February 2013 and completed spring practice the following April. With thirteen returning starters from the previous season, Alabama entered the 2013 season as the two-time defending national champions, ranked as the number one team in the nation and as a favorite to win the Western Division, the SEC and national championships. They were attempting to become the first FBS-equivalent team to three-peat as national champions since Minnesota in 1936. The Crimson Tide opened the season with eleven consecutive victories that included one over Virginia Tech at a neutral site, against Texas A&M in a game that saw many team records broken and an emotional victory over LSU at Bryant–Denny Stadium. In their twelfth game, Alabama was upset by Auburn. The loss, in a game known since as "Kick Six," kept the Crimson Tide out of the SEC Championship Game. Although they did not qualify to play for their third consecutive national championship with a final BCS ranking of third, Alabama did accept an invitation to play in the Sugar Bowl. Against Oklahoma, the Crimson Tide lost 45–31 despite being 17½ point favorites.

At the conclusion of the season, Alabama's defense was nationally ranked near the top in total defense, scoring defense, rushing defense and ranked passing defense. Offensively, the Alabama offense ranked 17th in scoring offense, 24th in rushing offense, 33rd in total offense and 49th in passing offense. Additionally, several players were recognized for their individual accomplishments on the field. C. J. Mosley won the Butkus Award as the top collegiate linebacker; A. J. McCarron won both the Maxwell Award as the overall player of the year and the Johnny Unitas Golden Arm Award as the top senior quarterback. Also, four players were named to various All-America Teams with C. J. Mosley being a unanimous selection and Ha Ha Clinton-Dix and Cyrus Kouandjio being consensus selections.

== Before the season ==
=== February player arrests ===
In February 2013 Tuscaloosa Police arrested four football players from the 2012 season: Brent Calloway, Tyler Hayes, D. J. Pettway and Eddie Williams. Williams was involved in four separate incidents on February 10 and 11. On February 10 he had a dispute with a gas station clerk about paying for gas and said he had to get something in the trunk of his car. The clerk called the police, the police arrested Williams with carrying a pistol without a license, but Williams was released later that day on a $500 bond. Later that night around 12:30 a.m., Williams attacked an Alabama student with Hayes and Pettway and they stole the student's backpack. In a separate incident almost an hour later, Williams attacked another student while Hayes and Pettway waited in a car. Later Williams used one of the students' credit cards. Calloway was also arrested after he used a victim's student debit card with knowledge it was stolen. Following the arrests, Alabama suspended all four from the football team. Alabama also prohibited Hayes, Pettway and Williams from entering campus. On February 27, Alabama dismissed all four players from the university after completing a judicial review.

=== Spring practice ===
A-Day

Team	1	2	3	4	Total
• White	10	0	0	7	17
Crimson	0	7	0	7	14

- Location: Tuscaloosa, Alabama
- Game start: 2:05 p.m.
- Elapsed time: 2:12
- Game attendance: 78,315
- Game weather: 65 °F (18 °C), Clear, Winds N 9 mph (14 km/h)
- Referee: Thomas Ritter
- TV announcers (ESPN2): Dave Neal (play-by-play), Todd Blackledge (analyst) and Maria Taylor (sidelines)

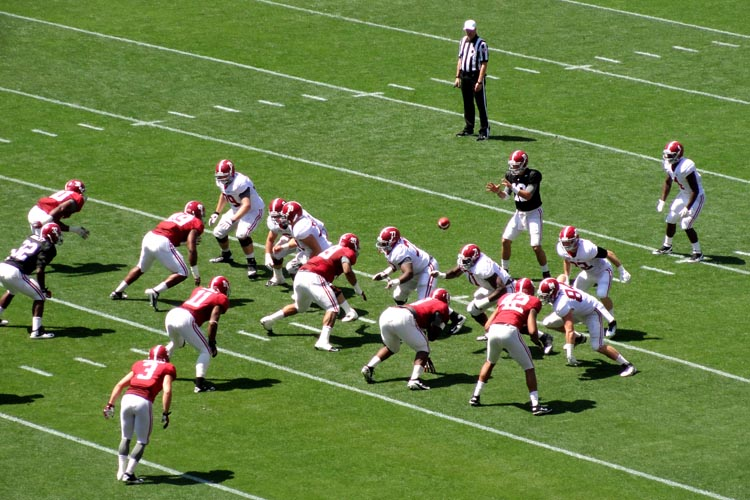
A. J. McCarron takes a snap for the White team at the A-Day Game.

Alabama started spring practice on March 16 and concluded 15 practices later on April 20 with the annual A-Day game. In the annual A-Day game at the conclusion of spring practice, the White team composed of offensive starters defeated the Crimson team of defensive starters 17–14. The White team opened on offense and scored a touchdown on their first possession on a 40-yard A. J. McCarron pass to Kenny Bell. After Nick Perry intercepted a Blake Sims pass on the first Crimson possession, the White team extended their lead to 10–0 on a 29-yard Adam Griffith field goal. Both offenses then struggled for the remainder of the first half with turnovers for the Crimson team coming on a second Perry interception of a Sims pass, an Alec Morris fumble recovered by Dillon Lee, and on a Cooper Bateman pass intercepted by Landon Collins. The White team had turnovers on a Kenny Bell fumble recovered by C. J. Mosley and on the last play of the first half when a McCarron pass was intercepted by Vinnie Sunseri and returned 86-yards for a touchdown that made the halftime score 10–7.

The offensive struggles continued into the second half with neither team scoring any points in the third quarter. In the fourth, the Crimson team took a 14–10 lead after Ha'Sean Clinton-Dix recovered a Brian Vogler fumble and returned it 55-yards for a touchdown. The White team responded on their next possession with a seven-yard T. J. Yeldon touchdown run for a 17–14 victory. For his performance, Ryan Kelly earned the Dwight Stephenson Lineman of the A-Day Game Award. On offense, Yeldon earned the Dixie Howell Memorial Most Valuable Player of the A-Day Game Award for his 129 all-purpose yards on the day that included 69 rushing and 60 receiving, and game-winning touchdown run.

=== Fall camp ===
By August, Alabama had a combined 31 players on 14 different preseason award watch lists. These players included C. J. Mosley, Ha'Sean Clinton-Dix and Deion Belue for the Chuck Bednarik Award; Amari Cooper and Kevin Norwood for the Fred Biletnikoff Award; Adrian Hubbard and Mosley for the Butkus Award; Cooper, A. J. McCarron, Mosley and T. J. Yeldon for the Walter Camp Award; Hubbard, Mosley, Cyrus Kouandjio and Anthony Steen for the Lombardi Award; Christion Jones for the Paul Hornung Award; Brian Vogler for the John Mackey Award; Cooper, McCarron, Mosley and Yeldon for the Maxwell Award; Belue, Clinton-Dix, Hubbard and Mosley for the Bronko Nagurski Trophy; McCarron for the Davey O'Brien Award; Kouandjio and Steen for the Outland Trophy; Ryan Kelly for the Rimington Trophy; Clinton-Dix for the Jim Thorpe Award; and Yeldon for the Doak Walker Award.

== Coaching staff ==
Alabama head coach Nick Saban completed his seventh year as the Crimson Tide's head coach for the 2013 season. During his previous six years with Alabama, he led the Crimson Tide to an overall record of 63 wins and 13 losses (63–13) and the 2009, 2011 and 2012 national championships. On January 9, 2013, former Colorado defensive coordinator Greg Brown was hired as the successor for Jeremy Pruitt as secondary coach. On February 18, former Florida International head coach Mario Cristobal was hired as Jeff Stoutland's replacement for offensive line coach. On February 21, former Florida State tight ends coach and recruiting coordinator Billy Napier was hired as Mike Groh's replacement as wide receivers coach.

Name	Position	Seasons at Alabama	Alma mater
Nick Saban	Head coach	7	Kent State (1973)
Greg Brown	Secondary	1	UTEP (1980)
Burton Burns	Associate head coach, running backs	7	Nebraska (1976)
Mario Cristobal	Assistant head coach, offensive line	1	Miami (1993)
Billy Napier	Wide receivers	1	Furman (2003)
Doug Nussmeier	Offensive coordinator, quarterbacks	2	Idaho (1993)
Chris Rumph	Defensive line	3	South Carolina (1994)
Kirby Smart	Defensive coordinator, inside linebackers	7	Georgia (1999)
Lance Thompson	Outside linebackers	4	The Citadel (1987)
Bobby Williams	Tight ends, special teams	6	Purdue (1982)
Scott Cochran	Strength and conditioning	7	LSU (2001)

=== Analysts ===
- Jeff Norrid
- Brendan Farrell
- Dean Altobelli
- Ronnie Leston
- Wesley Neighbors
- Jules Montinar
- Joe Palcic
- Jake Peetz

=== Graduate assistants ===
- John Van Dam
- William Vlachos

== Players ==
=== Returning starters ===
Alabama had six returning players on offense and seven on defense that started games in 2012. Another notable player that returned for 2013, but did not start in 2012, was running back T. J. Yeldon, who appeared in all 14 Alabama games in 2012 as the backup for Eddie Lacy. Additionally, four first-year players in 2012 made the SEC Coaches' All-Freshman Team: Amari Cooper, Ryan Kelly, D. J. Pettway and Yeldon.

==== Offense ====
Player	Class	Position
Amari Cooper	Sophomore	Wide Receiver
Christion Jones	Junior	Wide Receiver
Cyrus Kouandjio	Junior	Left Tackle
A. J. McCarron	Senior	Quarterback
Kevin Norwood	Senior	Wide Receiver
Anthony Steen	Senior	Right Guard

==== Defense ====
Player	Class	Position
Deion Belue	Senior	Cornerback
Ha Ha Clinton-Dix	Junior	Safety
Trey DePriest	Junior	Linebacker
Adrian Hubbard	Junior	Linebacker
C. J. Mosley	Senior	Linebacker
Ed Stinson	Senior	Defensive Line
Vinnie Sunseri	Junior	Safety

==== Special teams ====
Player	Class	Position
Cade Foster	Senior	Placekicker
A. J. McCarron	Senior	Holder
Cody Mandell	Junior	Punter
Christion Jones	Junior	Kickoff/Punt returner

=== Depth chart ===
Due to varying circumstances throughout the season, several players were rotated in and out of starting positions throughout Alabama's depth chart. Below is a listing of at what times during the season players were substituted as starter or saw increased playing time. On the offensive side of the ball, freshman Grant Hill split time with starter Austin Shepherd at right tackle against Kentucky. Kellen Williams was listed on the depth chart as a backup at left tackle and guard; however, coach Saban mentioned Williams as being the sixth starter who can fill in at all the offensive line positions. After the Ole Miss, Williams was listed as the back-up center to Chad Lindsay after an injury to starter Ryan Kelly.

On the defensive side of the ball, reserve Nick Perry sustained a shoulder injury in practice prior to the Colorado State game that ended his season. On October 2, Nick Saban announced the indefinite suspension of Ha Ha Clinton-Dix, and indicated Landon Collins and Geno Smith would play more in Clinton-Dix's absence. Clinton-Dix's eligibility was reinstated by the NCAA on October 18 after he served a two-game suspension for receiving an improper benefit.

The depth chart listed below shows starters and backups as announced in August 2013.

Defense

FS
Vinnie Sunseri
Landon Collins
Eddie Jackson
Jarrick Williams

WLB	ILB	ILB	SLB
Reggie Ragland	C. J. Mosley	Reuben Foster	⋅
Denzel Devall; Xzavier Dickson	Tana Patrick; Adrian Hubbard	Trey DePriest; Dillion Lee	⋅
⋅	⋅	⋅	⋅

SS
Ha Ha Clinton-Dix
Nick Perry
⋅

CB
Deion Belue
Bradley Sylve
⋅

DE	NT	DE
A'Shawn Robinson	Jonathan Allen; Dee Liner	Jeoffrey Pagan
Ed Stinson; LaMichael Fanning	Darren Lake; Korren Kirven; Dalvin Tomlinson	Brandon Ivory; Tana Patrick
⋅	⋅	⋅

CB
Geno Smith
John Fulton
⋅

Offense

WR
Amari Cooper
Kevin Norwood
Raheem Falkins

LT	LG	C	RG	RT
Cyrus Kouandjio	Arie Kouandjio	Ryan Kelly	Anthony Steen	Austin Shepherd
Kellen Williams	Kellen Williams; Isaac Luatua	Chad Lindsay	Alphonse Taylor	Leon Brown
Grant Hill	⋅	⋅	⋅	⋅

TE
Brian Vogler
O. J. Howard
Brandon Greene
⋅

WR
DeAndrew White
Kenny Bell
Robert Foster
⋅

QB
A. J. McCarron
Blake Sims
Cooper Bateman or Alec Morris

RB
T. J. Yeldon
Kenyan Drake
Derrick Henry
Dee Hart
Altee Tenpenny

FB
Jalston Fowler (H-Back)
Harrison Jones
⋅

Special teams
PK Cade Foster
PK Adam Griffith
P Cody Mandell
KR Christion Jones
Kevin Norwood
PR Christion Jones
Dee Hart
LS Cole Mazza
H A. J. McCarron

=== 2013 recruiting class ===
Prior to National Signing Day on February 6, 2013, nine players enrolled for the spring semester in order to participate in spring practice (six former high school seniors on scholarship, one former junior college player on scholarship, one walk-on from professional baseball and one walk-on from high school). The early enrollments from high school included quarterbacks Cooper Bateman and Parker McLeod, wide receiver Raheem Falkins, running back Derrick Henry, offensive lineman Brandon Hill and tight end O. J. Howard. Lineman Brandon Hill spent a post-graduate high school year at Hargrave Military Academy, and did not have the option to take a redshirt year, but still had four years of playing eligibility. Offensive tackle Leon Brown enrolled at Alabama after he transferred from junior college and would be eligible to play in the 2013 season and for a maximum of two seasons. Four of the eight players who were early enrollees in 2012 saw playing time in the 2012 season: Amari Cooper, Dillon Lee, T. J. Yeldon and Deion Blue.

Henry and Howard entered school as two of the top 100 recruits in the country. Henry was the No. 1 ranked "athlete" according to 247Sports Composite Rankings based on his potential to make an immediate impact at either running back or outside linebacker, but he had commented that he planned to compete at running back. Henry broke the national high school record for career yards, and in his 2012 high school season he averaged 328 yards per game.

In addition to those scholarship recruits that signed early, former professional baseball player Jai Miller and high school quarterback Luke Del Rio enrolled in order to compete for roster spots as invited walk-ons. Miller was a 28-year-old who out of high school signed to play baseball and football at Stanford, but ended up playing professional baseball out of high school after being drafted by the Florida Marlins in 2003. Based on the terms of his original contract, the Marlins would pay for Miller's tuition at Alabama.

On National Signing Day, Alabama signed 18 additional players out of high school that completed the 2013 recruiting class. The class was highlighted by fourteen players from the "ESPN 150": No. 9 Derrick Henry; No. 16 Reuben Foster; No. 25 Robert Foster; No. 26 Dee Liner; No. 28 Jonathan Allen; No. 32 Alvin Kamara; No. 36 Tim Williams; No. 44 Cooper Bateman; No. 45 O. J. Howard; No. 63 Tyren Jones; No. 81 Altee Tenpenny; No. 84 Maurice Smith; No. 86 Grant Hill and No. 105 A'Shawn Robinson. Alabama signed the No. 1 recruiting class according to Rivals.com and the No. 3 recruiting class according to Scout.com.

College recruiting (2013)
Name	Hometown	School	Height	Weight	40^{‡}	Commit date
Jonathan Allen; DE	Ashburn, Virginia	Stone Bridge High School	6 ft 3 in (1.91 m)	255 lb (116 kg)	4.5	May 21, 2012
Jonathan Allen; DE	Recruit ratings: Scout: Rivals: 247Sports: ESPN:					
Anthony Averett; CB	Glassboro, New Jersey	Woodbury Junior-Senior High School	6 ft 1 in (1.85 m)	178 lb (81 kg)	4.45	Apr 14, 2012
Anthony Averett; CB	Recruit ratings: Scout: Rivals: 247Sports: ESPN:					
Cooper Bateman; QB	Salt Lake City, Utah	Cottonwood High School	6 ft 3 in (1.91 m)	190 lb (86 kg)	4.8	May 16, 2012
Cooper Bateman; QB	Recruit ratings: Scout: Rivals: 247Sports: ESPN:					
Leon Brown; OL	Riverdale Park, Maryland	ASA College	6 ft 6 in (1.98 m)	315 lb (143 kg)	–	Jun 10, 2012
Leon Brown; OL	Recruit ratings: Scout: Rivals: 247Sports: ESPN:					
Jonathan Cook; DB	Spanish Fort, Alabama	Spanish Fort High School	6 ft 0 in (1.83 m)	185 lb (84 kg)	4.5	Dec 15, 2012
Jonathan Cook; DB	Recruit ratings: Scout: Rivals: 247Sports: ESPN:					
Raheem Falkins; WR	New Orleans, Louisiana	G. W. Carver High School	6 ft 4 in (1.93 m)	192 lb (87 kg)	4.5	Jan 28, 2012
Raheem Falkins; WR	Recruit ratings: Scout: Rivals: 247Sports: ESPN:					
Robert Foster; WR	Monaca, Pennsylvania	Central Valley High School	6 ft 2 in (1.88 m)	180 lb (82 kg)	4.44	Dec 21, 2012
Robert Foster; WR	Recruit ratings: Scout: Rivals: 247Sports: ESPN:					
Reuben Foster; MLB	Auburn, Alabama	Auburn High School	6 ft 1 in (1.85 m)	240 lb (110 kg)	4.65	Feb 4, 2013
Reuben Foster; MLB	Recruit ratings: Scout: Rivals: 247Sports: ESPN:					
Derrick Henry; RB	Yulee, Florida	Yulee High School	6 ft 3 in (1.91 m)	243 lb (110 kg)	4.5	Sep 28, 2012
Derrick Henry; RB	Recruit ratings: Scout: Rivals: 247Sports: ESPN:					
Brandon Hill; OL	Collierville, Tennessee	Hargrave Military Academy	6 ft 6 in (1.98 m)	350 lb (160 kg)	–	Dec 25, 2012
Brandon Hill; OL	Recruit ratings: Scout: Rivals: 247Sports: ESPN:					
Grant Hill; OG	Huntsville, Alabama	Huntsville High School	6 ft 6 in (1.98 m)	315 lb (143 kg)	–	Feb 22, 2012
Grant Hill; OG	Recruit ratings: Scout: Rivals: 247Sports: ESPN:					
O. J. Howard; TE	Prattville, Alabama	Autauga Academy	6 ft 6 in (1.98 m)	220 lb (100 kg)	4.5	Jul 18, 2011
O. J. Howard; TE	Recruit ratings: Scout: Rivals: 247Sports: ESPN:					
Eddie Jackson; WR	Lauderdale Lakes, Florida	Boyd H. Anderson High School	6 ft 1 in (1.85 m)	180 lb (82 kg)	–	Jan 30, 2013
Eddie Jackson; WR	Recruit ratings: Scout: Rivals: 247Sports: ESPN:					
Tyren Jones; RB	Marietta, Georgia	George Walton Comprehensive High School	5 ft 9 in (1.75 m)	197 lb (89 kg)	4.57	Feb 21, 2012
Tyren Jones; RB	Recruit ratings: Scout: Rivals: 247Sports: ESPN:					
Walker Jones; MLB	Cordova, Tennessee	Evangelical Christian School	6 ft 2.5 in (1.89 m)	225 lb (102 kg)	4.65	Jul 23, 2012
Walker Jones; MLB	Recruit ratings: Scout: Rivals: 247Sports: ESPN:					
Alvin Kamara; RB	Norcross, Georgia	Norcross High School	5 ft 10 in (1.78 m)	191 lb (87 kg)	4.54	Feb 6, 2013
Alvin Kamara; RB	Recruit ratings: Scout: Rivals: 247Sports: ESPN:					
Dee Liner; DT	Muscle Shoals, Alabama	Muscle Shoals High School	6 ft 4 in (1.93 m)	294 lb (133 kg)	–	Feb 6, 2013
Dee Liner; DT	Recruit ratings: Scout: Rivals: 247Sports: ESPN:					
Cole Mazza; LS	Bakersfield, California	Liberty High School	6 ft 3 in (1.91 m)	190 lb (86 kg)	–	Jun 14, 2012
Cole Mazza; LS	Recruit ratings: Scout: Rivals: 247Sports: ESPN:					
Parker McLeod; QB	Marietta, Georgia	George Walton Comprehensive High School	6 ft 2 in (1.88 m)	189 lb (86 kg)	–	Jun 8, 2012
Parker McLeod; QB	Recruit ratings: Scout: Rivals: 247Sports: ESPN:					
Darius Paige; DT	Foley, Alabama	Foley High School	6 ft 4 in (1.93 m)	292 lb (132 kg)	–	May 19, 2012
Darius Paige; DT	Recruit ratings: Scout: Rivals: 247Sports: ESPN:					
A'Shawn Robinson; DT	Fort Worth, Texas	Arlington Heights High School	6 ft 4 in (1.93 m)	305 lb (138 kg)	5.1	Feb 6, 2013
A'Shawn Robinson; DT	Recruit ratings: Scout: Rivals: 247Sports: ESPN:					
Maurice Smith; CB	Sugar Land, Texas	Dulles High School	5 ft 11 in (1.80 m)	174 lb (79 kg)	4.5	Jun 7, 2012
Maurice Smith; CB	Recruit ratings: Scout: Rivals: 247Sports: ESPN:					
ArDarius Stewart; ATH	Fultondale, Alabama	Fultondale High School	6 ft 1 in (1.85 m)	185 lb (84 kg)	4.4	Jan 28, 2012
ArDarius Stewart; ATH	Recruit ratings: Scout: Rivals: 247Sports: ESPN:					
Altee Tenpenny; RB	North Little Rock, Arkansas	North Little Rock High School	6 ft 0 in (1.83 m)	203 lb (92 kg)	4.42	Jan 28, 2012
Altee Tenpenny; RB	Recruit ratings: Scout: Rivals: 247Sports: ESPN:					
Tim Williams; DE	Baton Rouge, Louisiana	Louisiana State University Laboratory School	6 ft 4 in (1.93 m)	230 lb (100 kg)	4.60	Jan 12, 2013
Tim Williams; DE	Recruit ratings: Scout: Rivals: 247Sports: ESPN:					
Overall recruit ranking: Scout: 3 Rivals: 1 ESPN: 1
‡ Refers to 40-yard dash; Note: In many cases, Scout, Rivals, 247Sports, On3, and ESPN may conflict in their listings of height, weight and 40 time.; In these cases, the average was taken. ESPN grades are on a 100-point scale.; Sources: "Scout.com Football Recruiting: Alabama". Scout.; "2013 Player Signees- Alabama". ESPN.; "Scout.com Team Recruiting Rankings". Scout.; "2013 Team Ranking". Rivals.com.

== Schedule ==
The 2013 schedule was officially released on October 18, 2012. The 2013 schedule was developed as a "bridge" schedule for only the 2013 season, as a permanent system was developed by the conference in spring 2013. Alabama faced all six Western Division opponents: Arkansas, Auburn, LSU, Mississippi State, Ole Miss, and Texas A&M. They also faced two Eastern Division opponents: official SEC rival Tennessee and Kentucky. Alabama was not scheduled to play SEC opponents Georgia, Missouri, South Carolina, Florida or Vanderbilt. They also played four non-conference games: Virginia Tech of the Atlantic Coast Conference, Colorado State of the Mountain West Conference, Georgia State of the Sun Belt Conference and Chattanooga of the Southern Conference. The Crimson Tide had two bye weeks: their first was before they faced Texas A&M, and their second before they faced LSU. On December 9, Alabama was selected as an at-large BCS selection to compete in the Sugar Bowl against Oklahoma of the Big 12 Conference.

Date	Time	Opponent	Rank	Site	TV	Result	Attendance
August 31	4:30 p.m.	vs. Virginia Tech*	No. 1	Georgia Dome; Atlanta, GA (Chick-fil-A Kickoff Game)	ESPN	W 35–10	73,114
September 14	2:30 p.m.	at No. 6 Texas A&M	No. 1	Kyle Field; College Station, TX (College GameDay)	CBS	W 49–42	87,596
September 21	6:00 p.m.	Colorado State*	No. 1	Bryant–Denny Stadium; Tuscaloosa, AL	ESPN2	W 31–6	101,821
September 28	5:30 p.m.	No. 21 Ole Miss	No. 1	Bryant–Denny Stadium; Tuscaloosa, AL (rivalry)	ESPN	W 25–0	101,821
October 5	11:21 a.m.	Georgia State*^{†}	No. 1	Bryant–Denny Stadium; Tuscaloosa, AL	SECTV	W 45–3	101,254
October 12	6:00 p.m.	at Kentucky	No. 1	Commonwealth Stadium; Lexington, KY	ESPN2	W 48–7	69,873
October 19	6:00 p.m.	Arkansas	No. 1	Bryant–Denny Stadium; Tuscaloosa, AL	ESPN	W 52–0	101,821
October 26	2:30 p.m.	Tennessee	No. 1	Bryant–Denny Stadium; Tuscaloosa, AL (Third Saturday in October)	CBS	W 45–10	101,821
November 9	7:00 p.m.	No. 10 LSU	No. 1	Bryant–Denny Stadium; Tuscaloosa, AL (rivalry) (College GameDay)	CBS	W 38–17	101,821
November 16	6:45 p.m.	at Mississippi State	No. 1	Davis Wade Stadium; Starkville, MS (rivalry)	ESPN	W 20–7	57,211
November 23	1:00 p.m.	Chattanooga*	No. 1	Bryant–Denny Stadium; Tuscaloosa, AL	PPV	W 49–0	100,179
November 30	2:30 p.m.	at No. 4 Auburn	No. 1	Jordan–Hare Stadium; Auburn, AL (Iron Bowl) (College GameDay)	CBS	L 28–34	87,451
January 2, 2014	7:30 p.m.	vs. No. 11 Oklahoma*	No. 3	Mercedes-Benz Superdome; New Orleans, LA (Sugar Bowl)	ESPN	L 31–45	70,473
*Non-conference game; ^{†}Homecoming; Rankings from AP Poll released prior to the game; All times are in Central time

== Game summaries ==
=== Virginia Tech ===
Chick-fil-A Kickoff Game

Team	1	2	3	4	Total
Virginia Tech	7	3	0	0	10
• #1 Alabama	14	14	7	0	35

- Location: Atlanta, Georgia
- Game start: 5:36 p.m.
- Elapsed time: 3:13
- Game attendance: 73,114
- Game weather: Indoors
- Referee: Bill LeMonnier
- TV announcers (ESPN): Sean McDonough (play-by-play), Chris Spielman (color), Shannon Spake (sideline)

Scoring summary
1	13:21	Alabama	Christion Jones 72-yard punt return (Cade Foster kick)	Alabama 7–0
1	1:53	Alabama	T. J. Yeldon two-yard run (Cade Foster kick)	Alabama 14–0
1	1:37	Virginia Tech	Trey Edmunds 77-yard run (Cody Journell Kick)	Alabama 14–7
2	14:04	Alabama	Vinnie Sunseri 38-yard interception return (Cade Foster kick)	Alabama 21–7
2	3:39	Virginia Tech	Cody Journell 29-yard field goal	Alabama 21–10
2	3:25	Alabama	Christion Jones 94-yard kickoff return (Cade Foster kick)	Alabama 28–10
3	3:43	Alabama	Christion Jones 38-yard pass from A. J. McCarron (Cade Foster kick)	Alabama 35–10

On July 7, 2011, officials from both Alabama and Virginia Tech announced the Crimson Tide and the Hokies would meet to open the 2013 season in the Chick-fil-A Kickoff Game at Atlanta. In the game, the offense struggled, but Christion Jones became the first Alabama player to score two non-offensive touchdowns in a single game and led the Crimson Tide to a 35–10 victory at the Georgia Dome. After the Hokies were held to a three-and-out, Christion Jones gave Alabama a 7–0 lead with his first touchdown on a 72-yard punt return. The teams then traded a series of punts before T. J. Yeldon extended the Alabama lead to 14–0 with his two-yard touchdown run that capped a 49-yard drive.

Virginia Tech responded on the possession that ensued with their only touchdown of the game on a 77-yard Trey Edmunds touchdown run that cut the lead to 14–7. Early in the second quarter, Vinnie Sunseri intercepted a Logan Thomas pass and returned it 38-yards for a touchdown and a 21–7 lead. The teams then again traded punts before Kyle Fuller intercepted an A. J. McCarron pass that set up an eventual 29-yard Cody Journell field goal. On the kickoff that ensued, Jones scored his second non-offensive touchdown of the game on a 94-yard return that made the halftime score 28–10.

Neither team scored again until late in third quarter when McCarron Connected with Jones on a 38-yard touchdown pass that made the final score 35–10. For his three touchdown and 256 all-purpose yardage performance, Jones was recognized as the Walter Camp National Player of the Week. The victory improved Alabama's all-time record against the Hokies to 12–1.

=== At No. 6 Texas A&M ===
Team	1	2	3	4	Total
• #1 Alabama	7	21	14	7	49
#6 Texas A&M	14	0	7	21	42

- Location: College Station, Texas
- Game start: 2:42 p.m.
- Elapsed time: 3:35
- Game attendance: 87,596
- Game weather: 95 °F (35 °C), partly cloudy
- Referee: Tom Ritter
- TV announcers (CBS): Verne Lundquist (play-by-play), Gary Danielson (color), Tracy Wolfson (sideline)

Scoring summary
1	12:21	Texas A&M	Cameron Clear one-yard pass from Johnny Manziel (Taylor Bertolet kick)	Texas A&M 7–0
1	7:47	Texas A&M	Ben Malena one-yard run (Taylor Bertolet kick)	Texas A&M 14–0
1	5:24	Alabama	Kevin Norwood 22-yard pass from A. J. McCarron (Cade Foster kick)	Texas A&M 14–7
2	14:15	Alabama	DeAndrew White 44-yard pass from A. J. McCarron (Cade Foster kick)	14–14
2	8:55	Alabama	Kenny Bell 51-yard pass from A. J. McCarron (Cade Foster kick)	Alabama 21–14
2	0:45	Alabama	T. J. Yeldon four-yard run (Cade Foster kick)	Alabama 28–14
3	12:41	Alabama	Vinnie Sunseri 73-yard interception return (Cade Foster kick)	Alabama 35–14
3	9:33	Texas A&M	Malcome Kennedy 14-yard pass from Johnny Manziel (Taylor Bertolet kick)	Alabama 35–21
3	4:16	Alabama	Kenyan Drake three-yard run (Cade Foster kick)	Alabama 42–21
4	13:20	Texas A&M	Malcome Kennedy 12-yard pass from Johnny Manziel (Taylor Bertolet kick)	Alabama 42–28
4	8:04	Texas A&M	Mike Evans 95-yard pass from Johnny Manziel (Taylor Bertolet kick)	Alabama 42–35
4	2:28	Alabama	Jalston Fowler five-yard pass from A. J. McCarron (Cade Foster kick)	Alabama 49–35
4	0:15	Texas A&M	Malcome Kennedy four-yard pass from Johnny Manziel (Taylor Bertolet kick)	Alabama 49–42

In the first conference game of the 2013 season, Alabama defeated the Texas A&M Aggies at College Station, 49–42. Texas A&M opened the game with a pair of touchdowns on their first two offensive possessions and took a 14–0 lead. After they received the opening kickoff, the Aggies scored on their first possession when Johnny Manziel threw a one-yard touchdown pass to Cameron Clear and on their second possession on a one-yard Ben Malena touchdown run. Alabama responded with their first of five consecutive touchdowns on their next possession and cut the A&M lead to 14–7 when A. J. McCarron threw a 22-yard touchdown pass to Kevin Norwood.

After the Crimson Tide defense held the Aggies to a punt, McCarron threw his second touchdown pass of the afternoon on the drive that ensued early in the second quarter on a 44-yard flea flicker pass to DeAndrew White that tied the game 14–14. On the next drive, Cyrus Jones intercepted a Manziel pass in the end zone for a touchback and an Alabama possession. McCarron then threw his third touchdown pass on the game from 51 yards to Kenny Bell and gave the Crimson Tide their first lead of the game, 21–14. Alabama then closed the first half with an 11-play, 93-yard drive capped with a four-yard T. J. Yeldon touchdown run for a 28–14 halftime lead.

After the A&M defense forced a punt on the opening possession of the third quarter, Vinnie Sunseri intercepted the first Manziel pass of the second half and returned it 73 yards for a touchdown and extended the Alabama lead to 35–14. The Aggies responded on the drive that followed with a 14-yard Manziel touchdown pass to Malcome Kennedy which was followed with a three-yard Kenyan Drake touchdown run that made the score 42–21 in favor of the Crimson Tide at the end of the third quarter. In the fourth, the Aggies scored first on a 12-yard Kennedy touchdown reception, and Alabama looked like they were about to respond with a touchdown as well, but Yeldon fumbled at the two-yard line that was recovered by A&M. Three plays later, Manziel threw a 95-yard touchdown pass to Mike Evans that cut the Crimson Tide lead to 42–35. Alabama rebounded on their next drive that was capped with a five-yard McCarron touchdown pass to Jalston Fowler that extended their lead to 49–35. A four-yard touchdown pass from Manziel to Kennedy in the last 0:20 made the final score 49–42. Alabama recovered the ensuing onside kick to seal the win.

The 628 yards of total offense by A&M were the most ever surrendered by an Alabama defense in the history of the program. For his career-high 334 yards on 20 of 29 passing and four touchdowns, McCarron was recognized as the SEC Offensive Player of the Week. The victory improved Alabama's all-time record against the Aggies to 4–2.

=== Colorado State ===
Team	1	2	3	4	Total
Colorado State	0	0	6	0	6
• #1 Alabama	7	10	0	14	31

- Location: Tuscaloosa, Alabama
- Game start: 6:11 p.m.
- Elapsed time: 3:00
- Game attendance: 101,821
- Game weather: 72 °F (22 °C), Wind N 7 mph (11 km/h), Overcast
- Referee: Marc Curles
- TV announcers (ESPN2): Joe Tessitore (play-by-play), Matt Millen (color), Maria Taylor (sideline)

Scoring summary
1	0:39	Alabama	Kenyan Drake three-yard run (Cade Foster kick)	Alabama 7–0
2	12:41	Alabama	Dillon Lee 15-yard return of a blocked punt (Cade Foster kick)	Alabama 14–0
2	5:39	Alabama	Cade Foster 46-yard field goal	Alabama 17–0
3	7:40	Colorado State	Jared Roberts 45-yard field goal	Alabama 17–3
3	0:05	Colorado State	Jared Roberts 31-yard field goal	Alabama 17–6
4	11:47	Alabama	DeAndrew White 30-yard pass from A. J. McCarron (Cade Foster kick)	Alabama 24–6
4	1:13	Alabama	Chris Black 14-yard pass from Blake Sims (Cade Foster kick)	Alabama 31–6

On December 13, 2012, officials from both Alabama and Colorado State announced the Crimson Tide and the Rams would meet each other for the first time in the third game of the 2013 season. Although Alabama was a 40-point favorite as they entered the game, the Rams played the Crimson Tide close through the fourth quarter when a pair of late touchdowns gave Alabama a 31–6 victory. After both teams traded punts on their opening pair of possessions, Alabama took a 7–0 lead on a three-yard Kenyan Drake touchdown run.

Drake was able to score the first touchdown as he was the starting running back in the game due to T. J. Yeldon being suspended for the first quarter by Nick Saban for his unsportsmanlike conduct penalty against A&M the week before. They extended their lead to 14–0 early in the second quarter when Drake blocked a Rams punt that was returned 15-yards by Dillon Lee for a touchdown, and then to 17–0 at halftime when Cade Foster connected on a 46-yard field goal late in the quarter.

After Bernard Blake intercepted an A. J. McCarron pass on Alabama's first possession of the second half, Jared Roberts kicked a 45-yard field goal on the drive that ensured that made the score 17–3. Roberts then scored the Rams' only other points on their next possession with his 31-yard field goal. Early in the fourth quarter, Trey DePriest both forced and recovered a Garrett Grayson fumble. On the next play, Alabama scored on a 30-yard McCarron touchdown pass to DeAndrew White for a 24–6 lead. The Crimson Tide then made the final score 31–6 with a 15-yard Blake Sims touchdown pass to Chris Black. In the game, the Rams were led by former Crimson Tide offensive coordinator Jim McElwain and received $1.5 million to play the game at Bryant–Denny Stadium.

=== No. 21 Ole Miss ===
Team	1	2	3	4	Total
#21 Ole Miss	0	0	0	0	0
• #1 Alabama	3	6	7	9	25

- Location: Tuscaloosa, Alabama
- Game start: 5:36 p.m.
- Elapsed time: 3:14
- Game attendance: 101,821
- Game weather: 81 °F (27 °C), Wind ESE 6 mph (9.7 km/h), Clear
- Referee: Hubert Owens
- TV announcers (ESPN): Brad Nessler (play-by-play), Todd Blackledge (color), Holly Rowe (sideline)

Scoring summary
1	6:23	Alabama	Cade Foster 28-yard field goal	Alabama 3–0
2	5:44	Alabama	Cade Foster 53-yard field goal	Alabama 6–0
2	0:00	Alabama	Cade Foster 42-yard field goal	Alabama 9–0
3	14:08	Alabama	T. J. Yeldon 68-yard run (Cade Foster kick)	Alabama 16–0
4	5:43	Alabama	C. J. Mosley safety	Alabama 18–0
4	5:32	Alabama	Kenyan Drake 50-yard run (Cade Foster kick)	Alabama 25–0

In their first home conference game of the 2013 season, Alabama shutout the Ole Miss Rebels 25–0 at Tuscaloosa. After the Crimson Tide defense forced a punt on the Rebels' first possession, A. J. McCarron led the Alabama offense on an 11 play, 61-yard drive that ended with a 3–0 lead after a 28-yard Cade Foster field goal. Each team played strong defense for the remainder of the quarter with an Eddie Jackson interception of a Laquon Treadwell sideline pass for Alabama being the major play. Alabama then extended their lead in the second quarter to 9–0 at halftime after Foster connected on field goals of 53 and 42-yards.

On the second play of the third quarter, Alabama scored their first touchdown of the game. It came on a 68-yard T. J. Yeldon run and gave the Crimson Tide a 16–0 lead. Each team again traded punts before the Alabama defense stopped an Ole Miss scoring opportunity on a fourth-and-two play from their own seven-yard line that kept the score 16–0. In the fourth, Cody Mandell had a punt downed at the Rebels' one-yard line and on the next play, C. J. Mosley sacked Ole Miss quarterback Bo Wallace for a safety and an 18–0 lead. On the next offensive play for Alabama after they received the safety kick, Kenyan Drake scored on a 50-yard touchdown run that made the final score 25–0. The shutout was the first for the Rebels since their loss against Arkansas in 1998. The victory improved Alabama's all-time record against the Rebels to 47–9–2 (51–8–2 without NCAA vacations and forfeits).

=== Georgia State ===
Team	1	2	3	4	Total
Georgia State	0	0	3	0	3
• #1 Alabama	21	17	7	0	45

- Location: Tuscaloosa, Alabama
- Game start: 11:21 a.m.
- Elapsed time: 2:53
- Game attendance: 101,254
- Game weather: 85 °F (29 °C), Wind SE 6 mph (9.7 km/h), Partly Cloudy
- Referee: Matt Loeffler
- TV announcers (SEC TV): Dave Neal (play-by-play), Andre Ware (color), Cara Capuano (sideline)

Scoring summary
1	11:46	Alabama	Christion Jones 8-yard pass from A. J. McCarron (Cade Foster kick)	Alabama 7–0
1	3:08	Alabama	T. J. Yeldon 4-yard run (Cade Foster kick)	Alabama 14–0
1	2:55	Alabama	DeAndrew White 10-yard pass from A. J. McCarron (Cade Foster kick)	Alabama 21–0
2	13:48	Alabama	Kenyan Drake 23-yard pass from A. J. McCarron (Cade Foster kick)	Alabama 28–0
2	6:11	Alabama	Jalston Fowler 1-yard pass from A. J. McCarron (Cade Foster kick)	Alabama 35–0
2	0:36	Alabama	Cade Foster 27-yard field goal	Alabama 38–0
3	11:20	Georgia State	Wil Lutz 53-yard field goal	Alabama 38–3
3	6:18	Alabama	Chris Black 10-yard pass from Blake Sims (Adam Griffith kick)	Alabama 45–3

In their fifth game of the 2013 season and their second home game, Alabama defeated the Georgia State Panthers 45–3. A. J. McCarron led a 71-yard drive capped off with an eight-yard touchdown pass to Christion Jones for a 7–0 lead. On their first possession, Georgia State gained one first down but was quickly driven back by Alabama's defense who forced a punt. Alabama's next drive saw it lean more on the running game, and T. J. Yeldon scored on a four-yard touchdown run for a 14–0 Crimson Tide lead. On the kickoff that ensued, Dee Hart forced a fumble that Crimson Tide linebacker Dillon Lee recovered and returned to the Panthers' 10-yard line. On the next play, McCarron completed a touchdown pass to DeAndrew White that increased Alabama's lead to 21–0.

The Crimson Tide scored on its next two possessions as well, and McCarron completed touchdown passes to running backs Kenyan Drake and Jalston Fowler. With the lead at 35–0 late in the second quarter, Alabama played its reserves for much of the remainder of the game. After the Crimson Tide defense forced another punt from the Panthers, McCarron was replaced by backup quarterback Blake Sims. On his first possession at the helm of Alabama's offense, Sims led the team to the Georgia State one-yard line, but a pair of false starts forced Alabama to settle for a field goal that increased the lead to 38–0 at halftime.

Georgia State opened the second half with a drive to the Alabama 36-yard line to set up a school record 53-yard field goal by Wil Lutz. Alabama responded with a 68-yard march that ended in a touchdown pass from Blake Sims to Chris Black for a 45–3 lead. With the score at 45–3, neither team scored again. After a Panthers punt, Alabama's next drive ended with Crimson Tide backup kicker Adam Griffith missing a 30-yard field goal. Before his exit late in the second quarter, McCarron set the Alabama record for passing accuracy at 93.75%, going 15–16 and surpassed the previous record of 84.2% held by Ken Stabler. With the win, Alabama improved its all-time record against Georgia State to 2–0.

=== At Kentucky ===
Team	1	2	3	4	Total
• #1 Alabama	0	24	10	14	48
Kentucky	0	0	7	0	7

- Location: Lexington, Kentucky
- Game start: 7:06 p.m.
- Elapsed time: 3:26
- Game attendance: 69,873
- Game weather: 75 °F (24 °C), Wind NW 4 mph (6.4 km/h), Mostly Clear
- Referee: Penn Wagers
- TV announcers (ESPN2): Mark Jones (play-by-play), Brock Huard (color), Lewis Johnson (sideline)

Scoring summary
2	13:08	Alabama	Cade Foster 28-yard field goal	Alabama 3–0
2	9:50	Alabama	Kenyan Drake 1-yard run (Cade Foster kick)	Alabama 10–0
2	3:39	Alabama	T. J. Yeldon 24-yard run (Cade Foster kick)	Alabama 17–0
2	0:24	Alabama	Kenyan Drake 1-yard run (Cade Foster kick)	Alabama 24–0
3	11:38	Alabama	T. J. Yeldon 3-yard run (Cade Foster kick)	Alabama 31–0
3	7:05	Kentucky	Javess Blue 30-yard pass from Maxwell Smith (Joe Mansour kick)	Alabama 31–7
3	1:10	Alabama	Cade Foster 20-yard field goal	Alabama 34–7
4	10:04	Alabama	Kevin Norwood 20-yard pass from A. J. McCarron (Cade Foster kick)	Alabama 41–7
4	1:41	Alabama	Altee Tenpenny 7-yard run (Cade Foster kick)	Alabama 48–7

For the first time since 2009, Alabama played Kentucky at Lexington, and in the game Alabama defeated the Wildcats 48–7. Although the Crimson Tide defense opened the game strong and forced Kentucky to punt after they held the Wildcats to a series of three-and-outs on their initial possessions, the Alabama offense did not see the same on-field success. After they were held to a punt on their first possession, fumbles by Kenyan Drake and T. J. Yeldon on the next two Crimson Tide possessions inside the Wildcats' 15-yard line kept the game scoreless.

After a scoreless first quarter, Alabama took a 3–0 lead early in the second quarter on a 25-yard Cade Foster field goal. On their next possession, the Crimson Tide scored their first touchdown on a two-play drive that saw a 42-yard Kevin Norwood reception and a one-yard Drake touchdown run for a 10–0 lead. Alabama then extended their lead to 24–0 at halftime after touchdown runs of 24-yards from Yeldon and one-yard from Drake on their final two possessions of the half.

On their first possession of the second half, the Crimson Tide extended their lead further to 31–0 after Yeldon scored on a three-yard run that capped a drive that featured a 34-yard Yeldon run and 42-yard Amari Cooper reception. On the Kentucky possession that ensued, the Wildcats scored their only points of the game on a 30-yard Maxwell Smith touchdown pass to Javess Blue that made the score 31–7. The touchdown was the first allowed by the Alabama defense since the Texas A&M game and ended a 14-quarter touchdown-free streak for the Crimson Tide. A 20-yard Foster field goal then made the score 34–7 as they entered the fourth quarter.

In the fourth, the Crimson Tide scored touchdowns on both of their offensive possessions and made the final score 48–7. The first came on a 20-yard A. J. McCarron pass to Kevin Norwood and the second on a seven-yard Altee Tenpenny run. Offensively, McCarron threw for 359 yards and Drake and Yeldon ran for 106 yards and 124 respectively. This marked the first time in team history that Alabama had a 300-yard passer and two 100-yard runners in a single game. For his performance, right guard Anthony Steen was recognized as SEC Offensive Linemen of the Week. The victory improved Alabama's all-time record against the Wildcats to 36–2–1.

=== Arkansas ===
Team	1	2	3	4	Total
Arkansas	0	0	0	0	0
• #1 Alabama	14	14	17	7	52

- Location: Tuscaloosa, Alabama
- Game start: 6:15 p.m.
- Elapsed time: 3:06
- Game attendance: 101,821
- Game weather: 67 °F (19 °C), Wind NW 8 mph (13 km/h), Partly Cloudy
- Referee: Ken Williamson
- TV announcers (ESPN): Brad Nessler (play-by-play), Todd Blackledge (color), Holly Rowe (sideline)

Scoring summary
1	9:09	Alabama	Jalston Fowler 4-yard pass from A. J. McCarron (Cade Foster kick)	Alabama 7–0
1	4:36	Alabama	Kenyan Drake 1-yard run (Cade Foster kick)	Alabama 14–0
2	9:03	Alabama	Kenyan Drake 46-yard run (Cade Foster kick)	Alabama 21–0
2	1:07	Alabama	Amari Cooper 30-yard pass from A. J. McCarron (Cade Foster kick)	Alabama 28–0
3	13:28	Alabama	O. J. Howard 17-yard pass from A. J. McCarron (Cade Foster kick)	Alabama 35–0
3	8:18	Alabama	T. J. Yeldon 24-yard run (Cade Foster kick)	Alabama 42–0
3	3:02	Alabama	Cade Foster 48-yard field goal	Alabama 45–0
4	0:59	Alabama	Derrick Henry 80-yard run (Adam Griffith kick)	Alabama 52–0

In what was the first Bret Bielema coached team to play against the Crimson Tide, Alabama shut out the Arkansas Razorbacks 52–0 at Bryant–Denny Stadium. Alabama took a 7–0 lead on their first possession with a four-yard A. J. McCarron touchdown pass to Jalston Fowler and extended it to 14–0 on their second with a one-yard Kenyan Drake touchdown run. Later in the first, HaHa Clinton-Dix intercepted a Brandon Allen pass in what was his return to the team after he served a two-game suspension for a violation of NCAA rules.

After the Crimson Tide defense forced a punt on the first Razorback possession of the second quarter, Drake extended the Alabama lead to 21–0 with his 46-yard touchdown run. Arkansas responded on their next possession with their longest drive of the game. However, they were unable to score any points as Deion Belue blocked a 41-yard Zach Hocker field goal that preserved the shutout. On the next possession, Alabama closed the first half with a 30-yard McCarron touchdown pass to Amari Cooper that made the halftime score 28–0.

On the opening kickoff of the second half, Derrick Henry forced a Keon Hatcher fumble that was recovered by Eddie Jackson for the Crimson Tide. Three plays later, Alabama led 35–0 after McCarron threw a 17-yard touchdown pass to O. J. Howard. On their next offensive drive, T. J. Yeldon scored on a 24-yard touchdown run that extended the Crimson Tide lead to 42–0. The Alabama defense then had their second Allen interception of the evening on the Razorbacks possession that ensued with Cyrus Jones' play at the 47-yard line. With the offensive reserves in the game, Blake Sims led the team to a 45–0 lead after Cade Foster connected on a 48-yard field goal. Henry then made the final score 52–0 in the final minute of play with his 80-yard touchdown run. The victory improved Alabama's all-time record against the Razorbacks 14–8 (17–7 without NCAA vacations and forfeits).

=== Tennessee ===
Third Saturday in October

Team	1	2	3	4	Total
Tennessee	0	0	3	7	10
• #1 Alabama	21	14	7	3	45

- Location: Tuscaloosa, Alabama
- Game start: 2:39 p.m.
- Elapsed time: 3:09
- Game attendance: 101,821
- Game weather: 63 °F (17 °C), Wind SSW 3 mph (4.8 km/h), Clear w/ Sunny skies
- Referee: Matt Moore
- TV announcers (CBS): Verne Lundquist (play-by-play), Gary Danielson (color), Tracy Wolfson (sideline)

Scoring summary
1	13:32	Alabama	Amari Cooper 54-yard pass from A. J. McCarron (Cade Foster kick)	Alabama 7–0
1	8:44	Alabama	T. J. Yeldon 1-run (Cade Foster kick)	Alabama 14–0
1	0:28	Alabama	Kevin Norwood 22-yard pass from A. J. McCarron (Cade Foster kick)	Alabama 21–0
2	7:18	Alabama	T. J. Yeldon 1-run (Cade Foster kick)	Alabama 28–0
2	0:12	Alabama	Landon Collins 89-yard interception return (Cade Foster kick)	Alabama 35–0
3	12:53	Tennessee	Michael Palardy 37-yard field goal	Alabama 35–3
3	2:55	Alabama	T. J. Yeldon 1-run (Adam Griffith kick)	Alabama 42–3
4	12:58	Tennessee	Rajion Neal 3-yard run (Michael Palardy kick)	Alabama 42–10
4	6:50	Alabama	Adam Griffith 20-yard field goal	Alabama 45–10

In their annual rivalry game, Alabama defeated the Tennessee Volunteers 45–10 at Tuscaloosa. The Crimson Tide took a 21–0 lead after they scored touchdowns on all three of their first quarter possessions. The first came on a 54-yard A. J. McCarron pass to Amari Cooper, the second on a one-yard T. J. Yeldon run and the third on a 22-yard McCarron pass to Kevin Norwood. After Alabama extended their lead to 28–0 early in the second quarter on Yeldon's second one-yard run of the game, the defense made their first turnover when Deion Belue intercepted a Justin Worley pass.

However, the Crimson Tide were unable to capitalize on the drive that ensued after Kenyan Drake fumbled the ball at the goal line and was recovered by the Vols' Cameron Sutton. Looking to score before halftime, Tennessee drove from their one-yard line to the Alabama 24 before Worley threw his second interception of the game. This time Landon Collins made the play at the 11-yard line and returned it 89-yards for a touchdown and a 35–0 halftime lead. Tennessee opened the second half with their first points on a 37-yard Michael Palardy field goal that made the score 35–3. The Crimson Tide responded later in the third with Yeldon's third one-yard touchdown run of the game and extended their lead to 42–3.

In the fourth, the Vols scored their only touchdown on a three-yard Rajion Neal run and Adam Griffith then kicked his first field goal for the Crimson Tide and made the final score 45–10. For his six tackle performance and long interception return, Collins was recognized as the SEC Defensive Player of the Week. The victory improved Alabama's all-time record against the Volunteers to 50–38–7 (51–37–8 without NCAA vacations and forfeits).

=== No. 10 LSU ===
Team	1	2	3	4	Total
#10 LSU	0	14	3	0	17
• #1 Alabama	3	14	7	14	38

- Location: Tuscaloosa, Alabama
- Game start: 7:11 p.m.
- Elapsed time: 3:18
- Game attendance: 101,821
- Game weather: 54 °F (12 °C), Wind NNW 2 mph (3.2 km/h), Overcast
- Referee: Matt Austin
- TV announcers (CBS): Verne Lundquist (play-by-play), Gary Danielson (color), Tracy Wolfson (sideline)

Scoring summary
1	3:54	Alabama	Cade Foster 41-yard field goal	Alabama 3–0
2	14:56	LSU	Jeremy Hill 3-yard run (Colby Delahoussaye kick)	LSU 7–3
2	12:35	Alabama	O. J. Howard 52-yard pass from A. J. McCarron (Cade Foster kick)	Alabama 10–3
2	5:17	Alabama	Kevin Norwood 9-yard pass from A. J. McCarron (Cade Foster kick)	Alabama 17–3
2	0:43	LSU	Travin Dural 6-yard pass from Zach Mettenberger (Colby Delahoussaye kick)	Alabama 17–14
3	12:01	LSU	Colby Delahoussaye 41-yard field goal	17–17
3	4:11	Alabama	T. J. Yeldon 4-yard run (Cade Foster kick)	Alabama 24–14
4	10:31	Alabama	T. J. Yeldon 1-yard run (Cade Foster kick)	Alabama 31–14
4	4:10	Alabama	Jalston Fowler 3-yard pass from A. J. McCarron (Cade Foster kick)	Alabama 38–17

In their annual rivalry game, Alabama defeated the LSU Tigers at Tuscaloosa 38–17. After LSU forced an Alabama punt on their first possession, they proceeded to drive 79-yards to the Crimson Tide three-yard line. On the next play, Tana Patrick forced a J. C. Copeland fumble at the one-yard line that prevented a Tigers' score. The ball was recovered by Landon Collins and gave the Crimson Tide possession at their 10-yard line. After the LSU defense forced a second punt, their offense had their second turnover of the game when a Zach Mettenberger fumble was recovered by Trey DePriest at the Tigers' 27-yard line. Four plays later, Alabama took a 3–0 lead on a 41-yard Cade Foster field goal.

On their next possession, LSU responded with their first touchdown and a 7–3 lead on a three-yard Jeremy Hill run early in the second quarter. Alabama then retook a 10–7 lead on the next possession when O. J. Howard took a short slant pass from A. J. McCarron 52-yards for a touchdown. After the Crimson Tide defense forced a punt, their offense extended their lead to 17–7 on a nine-yard McCarron pass to Kevin Norwood. LSU then made the halftime score 17–14 after Mettenberger threw a six-yard touchdown pass to Travin Dural.

After the Tigers' tied the game 17–17 on a 41-yard Colby Delahoussaye field goal to open the second half, the Crimson Tide went on their first of three consecutive touchdown drives. Their first touchdown came on a four-yard T. J. Yeldon run that capped a 14 play, 79-yard drive that included a successful fake punt. On their next possession, Yeldon scored on a one-yard touchdown run that extended Alabama's lead to 31–17. Odell Beckham Jr. then returned the kickoff that ensued 82-yards to the Crimson Tide 18-yard line. However, the offense was unable to capitalize on the good field position as the Alabama defense forced a turnover on downs. The Crimson Tide then drove 78 yards in eight plays, capping the drive with a three-yard McCarron touchdown pass to Jalston Fowler that made the score 38–17. The Alabama defense then closed the game with three consecutive sacks of Mettenberger, winning 38–17. For his 12 tackle performance, C. J. Mosley was recognized as both the SEC Defensive Player of the Week and as the Lott IMPACT National Player of the Week. The victory improved Alabama's all-time record against the Tigers to 48–25–5.

=== At Mississippi State ===
Team	1	2	3	4	Total
• #1 Alabama	3	7	7	3	20
Miss State	0	0	7	0	7

- Location: Starkville, Mississippi
- Game start: 6:56 p.m.
- Elapsed time: 3:06
- Game attendance: 57,211
- Game weather: 65 °F (18 °C), Wind N 10 mph (16 km/h), Clear Skies
- Referee: Marc Curles
- TV announcers (ESPN): Brad Nessler (play-by-play), Todd Blackledge (color), Holly Rowe (sideline)

Scoring summary
1	7:59	Alabama	Cade Foster 33-yard field goal	Alabama 3–0
2	0:20	Alabama	Brian Vogler 18-yard pass from A. J. McCarron (Cade Foster kick)	Alabama 10–0
3	10:11	MS State	Charles Siddoway 0-yard fumble recovery (Evan Sobiesk kick)	Alabama 10–7
3	5:46	Alabama	Kevin Norwood 11-yard pass from A. J. McCarron (Cade Foster kick)	Alabama 17–7
4	12:15	Alabama	Cade Foster 35-yard field goal	Alabama 20–7

In their annual rivalry game, Alabama defeated the Mississippi State Bulldogs 20–7 at Starkville despite having four turnovers. Alabama won the coin toss and elected to receive the ball to start the game. They then scored on a 33-yard Cade Foster field goal for an early 3–0 lead. Both teams then traded punts for their next six combined possessions before the Bulldogs missed a 23-yard field goal midway through the second quarter. On the Alabama drive that ensued, the Crimson Tide had their first of four turnovers on a Taveze Calhoun interception of an A. J. McCarron pass. Alabama rebounded on their next possession with an 18-yard touchdown pass from McCarron to Brian Vogler that made the halftime score 10–0.

After the Crimson Tide defense forced a State punt to open the third quarter, Kendrick Market forced a T. J. Yeldon fumble that was recovered by Beniquez Brown at the State 49-yard line. The Bulldogs scored on their drive that ensued after Charles Siddoway recovered a Tyler Russell fumble in the endzone that made the score 10–7. Alabama responded on their next possession with an 11-yard McCarron touchdown pass to Kevin Norwood that extended their lead to 17–7. After the State possession that followed, HaHa Clinton-Dix intercepted a Tyler Russell pass. Foster then made the score 20–7 with his 35-yard field goal early in the fourth quarter. The Crimson Tide then had a difficult time closing the game as turnovers on consecutive possessions on a McCarron interception and a Kenyan Drake fumble. The victory improved Alabama's all-time record against the Bulldogs to 76–18–3 (78–17–3 without NCAA vacations and forfeits).

=== Chattanooga ===
Team	1	2	3	4	Total
Chattanooga	0	0	0	0	0
• #1 Alabama	7	21	14	7	49

- Location: Tuscaloosa, Alabama
- Game start: 1:06 p.m.
- Elapsed time: 2:39
- Game attendance: 100,179
- Game weather: 54 °F (12 °C), Wind N 13 mph (21 km/h), Overcast
- Referee: Hubert Owens
- TV announcers (CTSN): Chris Stewart (play-by-play), Tyler Watts (color), Tom Roberts (sideline)

Scoring summary
1	8:57	Alabama	Kenyan Drake 13 yd run (Cade Foster kick)	Alabama 7–0
2	12:31	Alabama	Derrick Henry 5-yard run (Cade Foster kick)	Alabama 14–0
2	09:57	Alabama	Christion Jones 75-yard punt return (Cade Foster kick)	Alabama 21–0
2	02:18	Alabama	Kevin Norwood 28-yard pass from A. J. McCarron (Cade Foster kick)	Alabama 28–0
3	11:19	Alabama	Amari Cooper 38-yard pass from A. J. McCarron (Cade Foster kick)	Alabama 35–0
3	05:33	Alabama	Chris Black 31-yard run (Cade Foster kick)	Alabama 42–0
4	05:07	Alabama	Dee Hart 6-yard run (Adam Griffith kick)	Alabama 49–0

In the final non-conference game the 2013 season, Alabama shutout the Chattanooga Mocs of the Southern Conference 49–0 on senior day at Bryant–Denny Stadium. After the Alabama defense forced a Mocs three-and-out on the first possession of the game, Christion Jones fumbled the punt that ensued with Sema'je Kendall for Chattanooga making the recovery at the Alabama 34-yard line. The Alabama defense once again held strong and Trey DePriest ended the possession with his interception at the 17-yard line on fourth down. The Crimson Tide offense then took the ball 83-yards on its first possession with Kenyan Drake making the score 7–0 on his 13-yard touchdown run.

Derrick Henry scored Alabama's next touchdown early in the second quarter on a five-yard run that extended their lead to 14–0. On the next Chattanooga possession, Alabama again forced a punt, but this time Jones returned it 75-yards for a touchdown and a 21–0 lead. The Mocs responded with their best drive of the game; however, A'Shawn Robinson blocked a 48-yard Nick Pollard field goal attempt that kept Chattanooga scoreless. The Crimson Tide then closed the half with a 28-yard A. J. McCarron touchdown pass to Kevin Norwood that made the halftime score 28–0.

Alabama continued their scoring into the third quarter with touchdowns on their first two possessions of the half. The first came on a 38-yard McCarron pass to Amari Cooper on a drive that also saw McCarron complete a pass to his brother Corey McCarron. The second came on a 31-yard Chris Black run that made the score 42–0. With the Crimson Tide significantly up, mostly back-up players completed the fourth quarter. After a long drive stalled at the Mocs' 23-yard line, Eddie Jackson returned a C. J. Board fumble caused by Jonathan Allen to the Chattanooga six-yard line. On the next play, Dee Hart made the final score 49–0 with his six-yard touchdown run. The victory improved Alabama's all-time record against the Mocs to 12–0.

=== At No. 4 Auburn ===
Iron Bowl

Team	1	2	3	4	Total
#1 Alabama	0	21	0	7	28
• #4 Auburn	7	7	7	13	34

- Location: Auburn, Alabama
- Game start: 2:41 p.m.
- Elapsed time: 3:44
- Game attendance: 87,451
- Game weather: 57 °F (14 °C), Wind E 7 mph (11 km/h), Sunny
- Referee: Matt Austin
- TV announcers (CBS): Verne Lundquist (play-by-play), Gary Danielson (color), Tracy Wolfson (sideline reporter)

Scoring summary
1	5:05	Auburn	Nick Marshall 45-yard run (Cody Parkey kick)	Auburn 7–0
2	11:00	Alabama	Jalston Fowler 3-yard pass from A. J. McCarron (Cade Foster kick)	7–7
2	07:12	Alabama	Kevin Norwood 20-yard pass from A. J. McCarron (Cade Foster kick)	Alabama 14–7
2	03:48	Alabama	T. J. Yeldon 1-yard run (Cade Foster kick)	Alabama 21–7
2	01:40	Auburn	Tre Mason 1-yard run (Cody Parkey kick)	Alabama 21–14
3	11:56	Auburn	C. J. Uzomah 13-yard pass from Nick Marshall (Cody Parkey kick)	21–21
4	10:28	Alabama	Amari Cooper 99-yard pass from A. J. McCarron (Cade Foster kick)	Alabama 28–21
4	0:32	Auburn	Sammie Coates 39-yard pass from Nick Marshall (Cody Parkey kick)	28–28
4	0:00	Auburn	Chris Davis 109-yard missed field goal return	Auburn 34–28

In the final regular season game the 2013 season, Alabama lost 34–28 to the Auburn Tigers after Chris Davis returned a missed Adam Griffith field goal 109-yards for the game-winning score with no time left on the clock in a game since dubbed "Kick Bama Kick". Going into the game, Alabama had been ranked atop the polls all season, while Auburn was fourth in all major polls, making this the highest combined ranking ever in the Iron Bowl. With the victory, Auburn won the SEC West division title and prevented Alabama from potentially playing for their third consecutive national championship.

After Alabama failed to score on the first drive when Cade Foster missed a 44-yard field goal attempt, Auburn took a 7–0 lead on their second offensive possession on a 45-yard Nick Marshall touchdown run. The Crimson Tide responded early in the second and tied the game 7–7 on a three-yard A. J. McCarron touchdown pass to Jalston Fowler. Alabama's Landon Collins both forced and recovered a Tre Mason fumble on the Tigers' possession that ensued. Four plays later Alabama took a 14–7 lead on a 20-yard McCarron pass to Kevin Norwood. The Crimson Tide then went ahead 21–7 on a one-yard T. J. Yeldon touchdown run, but Auburn responded with a late Mason touchdown run that made the halftime score 21–14.

The Tigers tied the score 21–21 on their first possession of the third quarter when Marshall threw a 13-yard touchdown pass to C. J. Uzomah. Early in the fourth Foster missed a 33-yard field goal attempt, but on their next possession McCarron connected with Amari Cooper for a 99-yard touchdown reception and a 28–21 lead. Late in the game, Ryan Smith blocked a 44-yard Foster field goal attempt, and on the Auburn possession that ensued Marshall threw a 39-yard touchdown pass to Sammie Coates that tied the game 28–28.

With seven seconds left in regulation and the score tied at 28, Yeldon made a long run as time expired. The play was reviewed from the replay booth, and one second was put back on the clock after the referees determined Yeldon had stepped out of bounds just before time expired. Alabama then opted to attempt a game-winning 57-yard field goal, but chose freshman kicker Adam Griffith over Foster due to Foster's woes that day. Alabama failed its fourth field goal of the day with Griffith's attempt falling short, but Auburn's Chris Davis fielded it nine yards deep in his own end zone, and with no Crimson Tide skill players in his path (the field goal unit was made up almost entirely of offensive linemen), sprinted for a 109-yard touchdown return and a 34–28 Auburn win. Under NCAA scoring rules, Davis was only credited for 100 yards on the play. The loss brought Alabama's all-time record against the Tigers to 42–35–1.

=== No. 11 Oklahoma ===
AllState Sugar Bowl

Team	1	2	3	4	Total
• #11 Oklahoma	14	17	0	14	45
#3 Alabama	10	7	7	7	31

- Location: New Orleans, Louisiana
- Game start: 7:32 p.m.
- Elapsed time: 3:52
- Game attendance: 70,473
- Game weather: Indoors
- Referee: Brad Allen
- TV announcers (ESPN): Brad Nessler (play-by-play), Todd Blackledge (color), Holly Rowe (sideline)

Scoring summary
1	13:11	Alabama	T. J. Yeldon 1-yard run (Cade Foster kick)	Alabama 7–0
1	9:43	Oklahoma	Lacoltan Bester 45-yard pass from Trevor Knight (Michael Hunnicutt kick)	7–7
1	7:02	Alabama	Cade Foster 27-yard field goal	Alabama 10–7
1	1:53	Oklahoma	Jalen Saunders 8-yard pass from Trevor Knight (Michael Hunnicutt kick)	Oklahoma 14–10
2	14:03	Alabama	DeAndrew White 67-yard pass from A. J. McCarron (Cade Foster kick)	Alabama 17–14
2	11:45	Oklahoma	Michael Hunnicutt 47-yard field goal	17–17
2	2:59	Oklahoma	Jalen Saunders 43-yard pass from Trevor Knight (Michael Hunnicutt kick)	Oklahoma 24–17
2	1:05	Oklahoma	Sterling Shepard 13-yard run (Michael Hunnicutt kick)	Oklahoma 31–17
3	8:49	Alabama	Derrick Henry 43-yard run (Cade Foster kick)	Oklahoma 31–24
4	10:44	Oklahoma	Sterling Shepard 9-yard pass from Trevor Knight (Michael Hunnicutt kick)	Oklahoma 38–24
4	6:22	Alabama	Derrick Henry 61-yard pass from A. J. McCarron (Cade Foster kick)	Oklahoma 38–31
4	0:47	Oklahoma	Geneo Grissom 8-yard fumble recovery (Michael Hunnicutt kick)	Oklahoma 45–31

On December 9, Alabama was selected as an at-large BCS participant to play in the Sugar Bowl against Oklahoma. Against the Sooners, the Crimson Tide were upset 45–31 against an upstart Oklahoma squad. Alabama opened the game with a four play, 75-yard touchdown drive that saw A. J. McCarron complete a 53-yard pass to Amari Cooper and T. J. Yeldon score on a one-yard run for a 7–0 lead. On the first Oklahoma possession of the game, Landon Collins intercepted a Trevor Knight pass that halted the Sooners' drive. However, on the Alabama play that ensued, McCarron threw an interception to Gabe Lynn, and Oklahoma responded on their next play with a 45-yard Knight pass to Lacoltan Bester that tied the game 7–7. Alabama retook a 10–7 lead on a 27-yard Cade Foster field goal, but the Sooners again responded and took a 14–10 lead at the end of the first quarter when Knight threw an eight-yard touchdown pass to Jalen Saunders.

Early in the second quarter, McCarron threw a 67-yard touchdown pass to DeAndrew White for a 17–14 lead. However, this would be the last time the Crimson Tide led in the game as a pair of turnovers by the Crimson Tide later in the quarter directly resulted in a pair of Oklahoma touchdowns. After the Sooners tied the game with a 47-yard Michael Hunnicutt field goal, Geneo Grissom recovered a Yeldon fumble at their eight-yard line and returned it to the 34. Seven plays later Knight threw a 43-yard touchdown pass to Saunders for a 24–17 Oklahoma lead. On the next offensive series, McCarron threw his second interception of the game to Zack Sanchez who returned it to the Alabama 13-yard line. On the next play, Sterling Shepard extended the Sooners' lead to 31–17 with his 13-yard touchdown run. The Crimson Tide was able to get into field goal range late, but Foster missed an attempt from 32-yards as time expired for the first half.

After the teams traded punts to open the second half, Derrick Henry made the score 31–24 with his 43-yard touchdown run for the only points scored in the third quarter. Oklahoma next scored on their opening possession of the fourth quarter on a nine-yard Knight touchdown pass to Shepard that capped an eight-play drive. Later in the quarter, Henry scored his second long touchdown of the game for Alabama on a 61—yard reception from McCarron that cut the Oklahoma lead to 38–31. However, the Sooners closed the game with a long drive that ran down the clock and in the final minute, an Eric Striker sack of McCarron caused a fumble that Grissom recovered and returned eight-yards for a touchdown and made the final score 45–31. The loss brought Alabama's all-time record against the Sooners 1–3–1.

== Rankings ==
As they entered the 2013 season, the Crimson Tide were ranked No. 1 in both the AP and Coaches' Preseason Polls. As they were still undefeated at the time of the initial Bowl Championship Series (BCS) standings, the Crimson Tide were ranked first by the BCS on October 21. Alabama remained in the No. 1 position through their final regular season game against Auburn. After their 34–28 loss against the Tigers, Alabama dropped to No. 4 in all of the standings. The Crimson Tide closed the regular season in the No. 3 position in all of the standings and failed to qualify for their third consecutive BCS National Championship Game. In the final poll of the season, Alabama dropped into the No. 7 position in the AP and No. 8 position in the Coaches' Polls after their loss against Oklahoma in the Sugar Bowl.

Ranking movements Legend: ██ Increase in ranking ██ Decrease in ranking ( ) = First-place votes
	Week																
Poll	Pre	1	2	3	4	5	6	7	8	9	10	11	12	13	14	15	Final
AP	1 (58)	1 (58)	1 (57)	1 (59)	1 (56)	1 (55)	1 (55)	1 (55)	1 (55)	1 (55)	1 (52)	1 (56)	1 (55)	1 (56)	4	3	7
Coaches	1 (58)	1 (58)	1 (58)	1 (61)	1 (59)	1 (59)	1 (57)	1 (58)	1 (57)	1 (56)	1 (54)	1 (58)	1 (56)	1 (56)	4	3	8
Harris	Not released							1 (93)	1 (95)	1 (94)	1 (95)	1 (105)	1 (100)	1 (99)	4	3	Not released
BCS	Not released								1	1	1	1	1	1	4	3	Not released

== After the season ==
=== Final statistics ===
After their loss to Oklahoma in the Sugar Bowl, Alabama's final team statistics were released. Nationally, Cody Mandell led the nation with an average of 42.43 net yards per punt. On the defensive side of the ball, of the 124 FBS teams, the Crimson Tide was ranked near the top of all major defensive categories both nationally and in conference. They ranked fourth nationally and first in conference scoring defense (13.9 points per game), fifth nationally and first in conference in total defense (286.50 yards per game), seventh nationally and first in conference in rushing defense (106.2 yards per game) and eleventh nationally and second in conference in passing defense (180.3 yards per game). Individually, C. J. Mosley led the team with 108 total tackles, 61 of which were assisted, and 47 solo tackles. Mosley also led the team with 8 tackles for loss. A'Shawn Robinson led the team with 5.5 quarterback sacks. Ha Ha Clinton-Dix, Landon Collins, Cyrus Jones and Vinnie Sunseri tied for the team lead in interception with each having made two.

On offense, of the 124 FBS teams, Alabama ranked 17th nationally and fourth in conference in scoring offense (38.2 points per game), 24th nationally and fourth in conference in rushing offense (205.6 yards per game), 33rd nationally and sixth in conference in total offense (454.1 yards per game) and 49th nationally and seventh in conference in passing offense (248.5 yards per game). A. J. McCarron led the team in passing offense and completed 226 of 336 passes for 3,063 passing yards and 28 touchdowns. Amari Cooper led the team with 45 receptions for 736 yards and Kevin Norwood led the team with seven touchdown receptions. T. J. Yeldon led the team with 207 rushing attempts for 1,279 yards and 14 touchdown runs. Kenyan Drake was second on the team with 92 rushing attempts for 694 yards and 8 touchdown runs.

=== Awards ===
After the SEC Championship Game, multiple Alabama players were recognized for their on-field performances with a variety of awards and recognitions. At the team awards banquet on December 8, A. J. McCarron C. J. Mosley and Kevin Norwood were each named the permanent captains of the 2013 squad. At that time Mosley was also named the 2013 most valuable player with Mosley and HaHa Clinton-Dix named defensive players of the year and A. J. McCarron and T. J. Yeldon named offensive players of the year.

==== Conference ====
The SEC recognized several players for their individual performances with various awards. On December 11, C. J. Mosley was named SEC co-Defensive Player of the year with Michael Sam of Missouri, and Christion Jones was named SEC Special Teams Player of the Year. On December 9, Cyrus Kouandjio, Cody Mandell, Mosley and Anthony Steen were named to the AP All-SEC First Team. HaHa Clinton-Dix, Landon Collins, Christion Jones, Trey DePriest and T. J. Yeldon were named to the AP All-SEC Second Team; Brandon Ivory, A. J. McCarron and Vinnie Sunseri were named to the AP All-SEC Honorable Mention Team. Clinton-Dix, Jones, Kouandjio, Mosley and Yeldon were named to the Coaches' All-SEC First Team. Mandell, McCarron, Steen and Ed Stinson were named to the Coaches' All-SEC Second Team. A'Shawn Robinson was named to the SEC All-Freshman Team.

==== National ====
After the season, a number of Alabama players both won and were named as national award winners and finalists. Finalists for major awards from the Crimson Tide included: C. J. Mosley for the Bronko Nagurski Trophy, Chuck Bednarik Award and the Lombardi Award and A. J. McCarron for the Davey O'Brien Award. Mosley won the Butkus Award as the top collegiate linebacker and McCarron won both the Maxwell Award as the overall player of the year and the Johnny Unitas Golden Arm Award as the top senior quarterback. McCarron also finished second behind Jameis Winston in voting for the Heisman Trophy.

For their individual performances during the regular season, several players were named to various national All-American Teams. Cyrus Kouandjio, A. J. McCarron and C. J. Mosley were named to the Walter Camp All-America First Team (WC). HaHa Clinton-Dix and Mosley were named to the Sporting News (TSN) All-America Team. Kouandjio and Mosley were named to the Associated Press All-American First Team; Clinton-Dix and McCarron were named to the Associated Press All-American Second Team. Clinton-Dix, Kouandjio and Mosley were named to the Football Writers Association of America (FWAA) All-America Team.

The NCAA recognizes five All-America lists in the determination of both consensus and unanimous All-America selections: the AP, AFCA, the FWAA, TSN and the WC. In order for an honoree to earn a consensus selection, he must be selected as first team in three of the five lists recognized by the NCAA, and unanimous selections must be selected as first team in all five lists. As such, for the 2013 season Mosley was a unanimous selection and Clinton-Dix and Kouandjio were consensus selections.

==== All-star games ====
Several Alabama players were selected by postseason all-star games. Kenny Bell and John Fulton were selected to play in the College All-Star Bowl. Cody Mandell, C. J. Mosley, Kevin Norwood and Ed Stinson all accepted invitations to play in the Senior Bowl. Adrian Hubbard was also invited to compete in the game as fourth-year junior and became only the third non-senior to participate in the Senior Bowl. Invitations were also extended to Deion Belue and A. J. McCarron to participate in the game. Alabama did not have players participate in the East–West Shrine Game or the NFLPA Collegiate Bowl.

=== Coaching changes ===
In the weeks that followed the conclusion of the season, several changes were made to the Alabama coaching staff. On January 9 offensive coordinator Doug Nussmeier was officially hired in the same capacity at Michigan as the replacement for Al Borges. On January 10, former Oakland Raiders, Tennessee and USC head coach Lane Kiffin was hired as the replacement for Nussmeier as both offensive coordinator and quarterbacks coach. On January 11, it was announced defensive line coach Chris Rumph had resigned and took the same position on the Texas staff. On January 13 USC defensive line coach Bo Davis was hired as Rumph's replacement. Davis previously coached defensive line at Alabama from 2007 to 2010 and had also served under Saban at LSU and with the Miami Dolphins. On February 12, Greg Brown resigned to become the safeties coach at Louisville. Two days later, Kevin Steele was promoted from Alabama's director of player personnel to inside linebackers coach. Steele previously served as a defensive assistant for Saban at Alabama in 2007 and 2008.

=== NFL draft ===
Of all the draft-eligible juniors, Ha Ha Clinton-Dix, Adrian Hubbard, Cyrus Kouandjio, Jeoffrey Pagan and Vinnie Sunseri declared their eligibility for the 2014 NFL draft. At the time of their announcement, Clinton-Dix and Kouandjio were projected to be first-round picks and both Hubbard and Pagan were projected to be no lower than third-round picks. With their departures it marked the first time during the Saban era that more than three juniors declared early for the NFL Draft. In February 2014, twelve Alabama players, seven seniors and five juniors, were invited to the NFL Scouting Combine. The invited players were offensive linemen Cyrus Kouandjio and Anthony Steen, safeties Ha Ha Clinton-Dix and Vinnie Sunseri, linebackers Adrian Hubbard and C. J. Mosley, defensive ends Jeoffrey Pagan and Ed Stinson, quarterback A. J. McCarron, wide receiver Kevin Norwood, cornerback Deion Belue and punter Cody Mandell.

In the first round, two Crimson Tide players were selected: Mosley (17th Baltimore Ravens) and Clinton-Dix (21st Green Bay Packers). Kouandjio was selected in the second round (44th Buffalo Bills); Norwood (123rd Seattle Seahawks) was selected in the fourth round; Stinson (160th Arizona Cardinals), McCarron (164th Cincinnati Bengals) and Sunseri (167th New Orleans Saints) were selected in the fifth round; and Pagan (177th Houston Texans) was selected in the sixth round. In the days after the draft, several players from the 2013 squad that were not drafted signed as undrafted free agents. These players included Hubbard (Green Bay Packers), Steen (Arizona Cardinals), Mandell (Dallas Cowboys), John Fulton (Philadelphia Eagles), Tana Patrick (Chicago Bears) and Belue (Miami Dolphins).
