= Brad Allen =

American football official

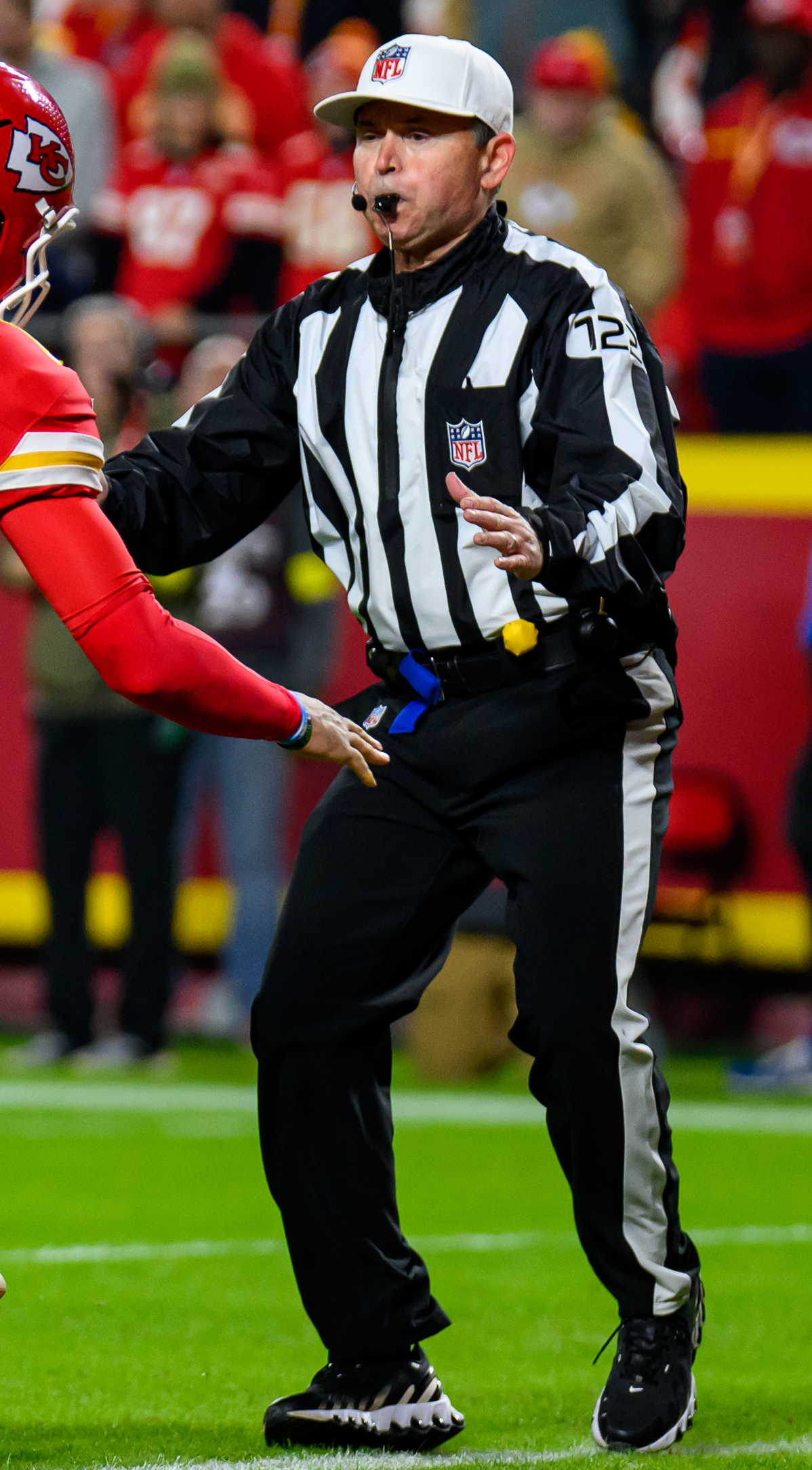
- Allen at Arrowhead Stadium in 2025
- Born: 1969 or 1970 (age 55–56); Lumberton, North Carolina, U.S.
- Education: UNC Pembroke
- Occupation: NFL official (2014–present)

Brad Allen is an American professional football official in the National Football League (NFL) since the 2014 NFL season, wearing uniform number 122.

== Career ==
A native of Lumberton, North Carolina, and a graduate of the University of North Carolina at Pembroke (formerly Pembroke State University), Allen began officiating football games at the high school, and later, ACC levels. He called the 2007 Motor City Bowl, the 2009 International Bowl, the 2012 Rose Bowl and the 2014 Sugar Bowl.

When he made his NFL officiating debut in 2014, he was originally going to be an umpire, but when long-time referee Mike Carey announced his retirement on June 24, 2014, Allen was given the referee position instead; this was the first time since 1962 that an NFL official in his first year of officiating was given that honor (Tommy Bell was the last NFL official to do so).

During the 2023 season, he drew widespread attention when the officiating crew he led made a questionable call on December 30 in a Detroit Lions game against the Dallas Cowboys. Allen's crew nullified a Detroit two-point conversion in the game's final minute, as Lions offensive tackle Taylor Decker, who made the two-point conversion, was flagged for illegal touching. After the game, a video was released showing Decker telling Allen that he was an eligible receiver, however, Allen stated that it was Dan Skipper who reported, as the latter made a hand gesture. Skipper later denied reporting to Allen as an eligible receiver. It ultimately led to Detroit losing the game to the Cowboys. The penalty was abhorred by both Lions fans and the media. That, and several other controversial calls during the 2023 NFL season, led the league to downgrade the crew and prevent them from officiating playoff games.

Though not publicized by the NFL, that ban was lifted ahead of the 2024 playoffs, when Allen and his crew were named to serve as the officials during the NFC Wild Card matchup between the Philadelphia Eagles and the Green Bay Packers. They proceeded to make another controversial call in the game, ruling that a fumble that appeared to be recovered by Packers kick returner Keisean Nixon was recovered by the Eagles. They stuck with their call after the review showed the ball had, in fact, been recovered by Nixon. This led to suggestions that a further ban may be necessary.

=== Officiating crew ===
Allen's officiating crew for the 2025 NFL season is as follows:

- R: Brad Allen
- U: Marcus Woods
- DJ: Sarah Thomas
- LJ: Walter Flowers
- FJ: Rick Patterson
- SJ: Chad Hill
- BJ: Tyree Walton
- RO: Kevin Brown
- RA: Randy Roseberry

== Personal life ==
Outside of officiating NFL games, Allen is executive director of the N.C. Senior Games, and the CEO of a non-profit. He also serves as clinic leader and booking supervisor for the Southern Officials Association.

== Statistics ==
| | | | | | | Totals | | | | | | League Averages | | | |
| Year | G | G plyf | Pos | Home | Visitor | Home% | HWin% | Tot | Yds | Pen/G | Yds/G | Home% | HWin% | Pen/G | Yds/G |
| 2014 | 15 | 0 | Referee | 65 | 103 | 38.69% | 0.40% | 168 | 1388 | 11.2 | 92.53 | 48.41% | 0.57% | 13.21 | 110.68 |
| 2015 | 15 | 0 | Referee | 85 | 101 | 45.70% | 0.33% | 186 | 1494 | 12.4 | 99.6 | 49.16% | 0.54% | 13.75 | 117.11 |
| 2016 | 16 | 1 | Referee | 131 | 125 | 51.17% | 0.63% | 256 | 2218 | 16 | 138.63 | 48.68% | 0.58% | 13.33 | 114.94 |
| 2017 | 16 | 1 | Referee | 79 | 112 | 41.36% | 0.69% | 191 | 1626 | 11.94 | 101.63 | 47.84% | 0.57% | 13.2 | 114.62 |
| 2018 | 15 | 0 | Referee | 91 | 91 | 50.00% | 0.53% | 182 | 1511 | 12.13 | 100.73 | 49.03% | 0.59% | 13.37 | 113.84 |
| 2019 | 15 | 0 | Referee | 101 | 99 | 50.50% | 0.67% | 200 | 1688 | 13.33 | 112.53 | 47.44% | 0.52% | 13.37 | 113.41 |
| 2020 | 16 | 1 | Referee | 84 | 83 | 50.30% | 0.56% | 167 | 1473 | 10.44 | 92.06 | 48.28% | 0.50% | 11.11 | 95.95 |
