= Anthony Steen (American football) =

American football player (born 1990)

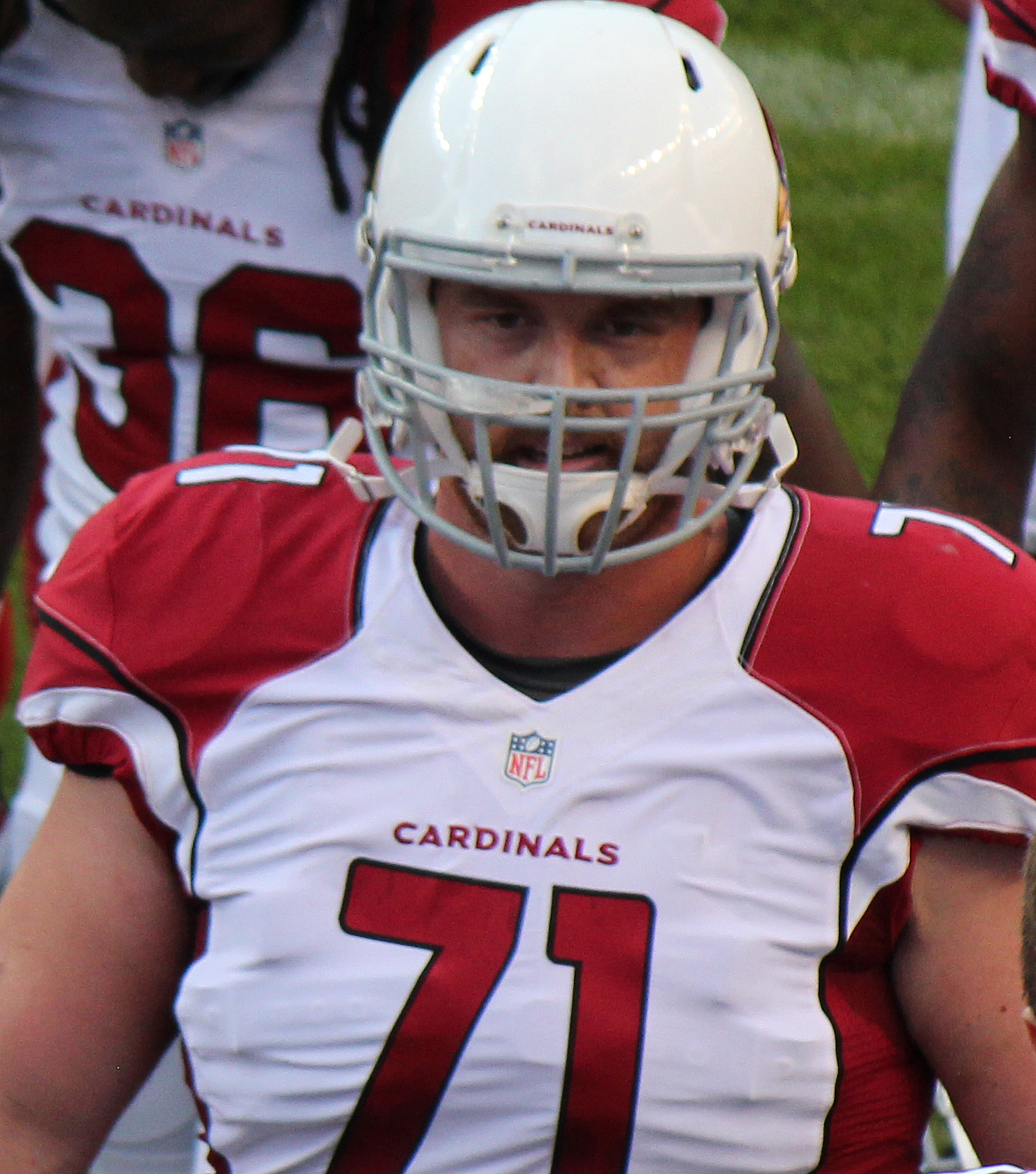
- Steen with the Arizona Cardinals in 2015

No. 65
- Position: Center

Personal information
- Born: May 9, 1990 (age 36); Lambert, Mississippi, U.S.
- Listed height: 6 ft 3 in (1.91 m)
- Listed weight: 314 lb (142 kg)

Career information
- High school: Clarksdale (MS) Lee Academy
- College: Alabama
- NFL draft: 2014: undrafted

Career history
- Arizona Cardinals (2014–2015); Miami Dolphins (2015–2017)

Awards and highlights
- 3× BCS national champion (2009, 2011, 2012); Second-team All-SEC (2013)

Career NFL statistics
- Games played: 21
- Games started: 13
- Stats at Pro Football Reference

Anthony Steen (born May 9, 1990) is an American former professional football player who was a center in the National Football League (NFL). He played college football for the Alabama Crimson Tide. Steen was a member of Alabama's 2009 national championship team during his redshirt year as a freshman and played as a starting offensive guard for both the 2011 and 2012 national championship teams. After going undrafted in the 2014 NFL draft, Steen signed as an undrafted free agent with the Arizona Cardinals.

== Early life ==
Steen played high school football at the Lee Academy in Clarksdale, Mississippi, and was a part of the 2009 recruiting class at Alabama. He verbally committed to the Crimson Tide on July 29, 2008, and officially signed on National Signing Day the following February. He selected Alabama over offers from Florida State, Miami, Mississippi State, and Southern Miss.

== College career ==
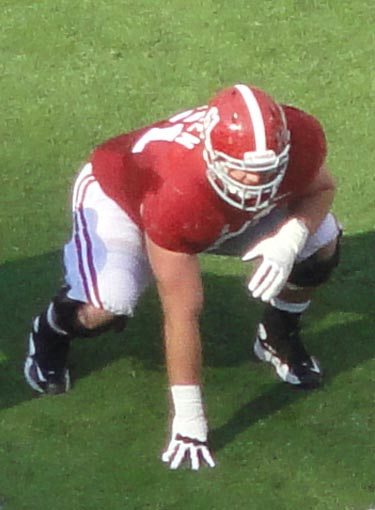
Steen with Alabama in 2013

After Steen was redshirted for the 2009 season, he started the final two regular season games of the 2010 season after starting guard Barrett Jones was injured against Mississippi State.

For the 2011 season, Steen became a starter on the offensive line at the guard position. He played in all 13 games, but only started in 9 after he suffered concussion against Ole Miss. For his redshirt junior season in 2012, Steen started all 14 games at the right guard position and was named the team's offensive player of the week for his performance against Western Carolina. At the conclusion of the season, Steen was the only member of the offensive line that did not record a penalty or allow a quarterback sack for the season. After the completion of the 2012 season, Steen announced he would return for his senior season. At the time of his announcement Steen cited both to improve his draft stock as well as a desire to compete for one final season at Alabama as his reasons for remaining with the Crimson Tide. For the 2014 NFL draft, Steen is ranked as one of the top offensive guards in his class. For his final season at Alabama, Steen and Cyrus Kouandjio were the only returning starters on the offensive line and both were also named to various award watchlists for the 2013 season.

As the only senior on the offensive line for the 2013 season, Steen was the leader of the line. For his performance against Kentucky, Steen was recognized as SEC Offensive Linemen of the Week.

Steen was a second-team All-Southeastern Conference (SEC) selection.

== Professional career ==
Pre-draft measurables
Height	Weight	Arm length	Hand span
6 ft 3 in (1.91 m)	314 lb (142 kg)	30 1/2 in (0.77 m)	9 1/8 in (0.23 m)
All values from NFL Combine

=== Arizona Cardinals ===
After going undrafted in the 2014 NFL draft, Steen signed with the Arizona Cardinals as an undrafted free agent on May 12, 2014. The Cardinals released Steen on August 30, 2014, but he was re-signed to their practice squad the next day.

On September 5, 2015, he was released by the Cardinals. On September 10, 2015, Steen was brought back to the team and was placed on the practice squad. On September 22, 2015, he was released by the Cardinals.

=== Miami Dolphins ===
On November 24, 2015, Steen was signed to the Dolphins' practice squad.

Steen made the Dolphins' final roster in 2016, starting seven games at center in place of injured Pro Bowl starter Mike Pouncey.

In 2017, Steen was named the starting left guard to start the season. He started the first six games before being placed on injured reserve on October 31, 2017, with a foot injury.
