= Ed Stinson =

American football player (born 1990)

No. 72, 91, 97
- Position: Defensive end

Personal information
- Born: February 15, 1990 (age 36); Homestead, Florida, U.S.
- Listed height: 6 ft 3 in (1.91 m)
- Listed weight: 287 lb (130 kg)

Career information
- High school: Homestead (FL) South Dade
- College: Alabama
- NFL draft: 2014: 5th round, 160th overall pick

Career history
- Arizona Cardinals (2014–2017); New York Jets (2017)

Awards and highlights
- BCS national champion (2010, 2012, 2013); Second-team All-SEC (2013)

Career NFL statistics
- Total tackles: 27
- Sacks: 1
- Stats at Pro Football Reference

Ed Stinson (born February 15, 1990) is an American former professional football player who was a defensive end in the National Football League (NFL). He was selected by the Arizona Cardinals in the fifth round of the 2014 NFL draft. He played college football for the Alabama Crimson Tide.

== College career ==
Stinson was a member of Alabama's 2009 national championship team during his redshirt year as a freshman, played as a backup for the 2011 and starting defensive lineman for the 2012 national championship teams. Stinson was ranked as one of the top defensive end prospects for the 2014 NFL draft.

=== College statistics ===
| Year | GP–GS | Tackles | | | | Sacks | Pass Defense | | | | Fumbles | | Blocked |
| Year | GP–GS | Solo | Ast | Total | Loss–Yards | No–Yards | Int–Yards | BU | PD | QBH | No–Yards | FF | Kick |
|---|---|---|---|---|---|---|---|---|---|---|---|---|---|
| 2009 | Redshirt | | | | | | | | | | | | |
| 2010 | 9–0 | 8 | 6 | 14 | 0–0 | 0–0 | 0–0 | 0 | 0 | 2 | 0–0 | 0 | 0 |
| 2011 | 13–0 | 10 | 9 | 19 | 5-12 | 1–3 | 0–0 | 1 | 1 | 0 | 2–0 | 1 | 0 |
| 2012 | 14–14 | 20 | 10 | 30 | 8.5–23 | 3–15 | 0–0 | 0 | 0 | 5 | 0–0 | 0 | 0 |
| 2013 | 12–12 | 15 | 23 | 38 | 2–7 | 1.5–6 | 0–0 | 1 | 1 | 4 | 1–0 | 0 | 0 |
| Total | | 53 | 48 | 101 | 15.5–42 | 5.5–24 | 0–0 | 2 | 2 | 11 | 3–0 | 1 | 0 |

== Professional career ==
=== Arizona Cardinals ===
Stinson was selected by the Arizona Cardinals in the fifth round, 160th overall, of the 2014 NFL draft.

On September 2, 2017, Stinson was placed on injured reserve. He was released by the Cardinals on September 12, 2017.

=== New York Jets ===
On October 4, 2017, Stinson signed with the New York Jets. He was released by the Jets on October 31, 2017. He was re-signed on November 7, 2017. He was waived/injured on November 11, 2017, and placed on injured reserve.
