= Geneo Grissom =

American football player (born 1992)

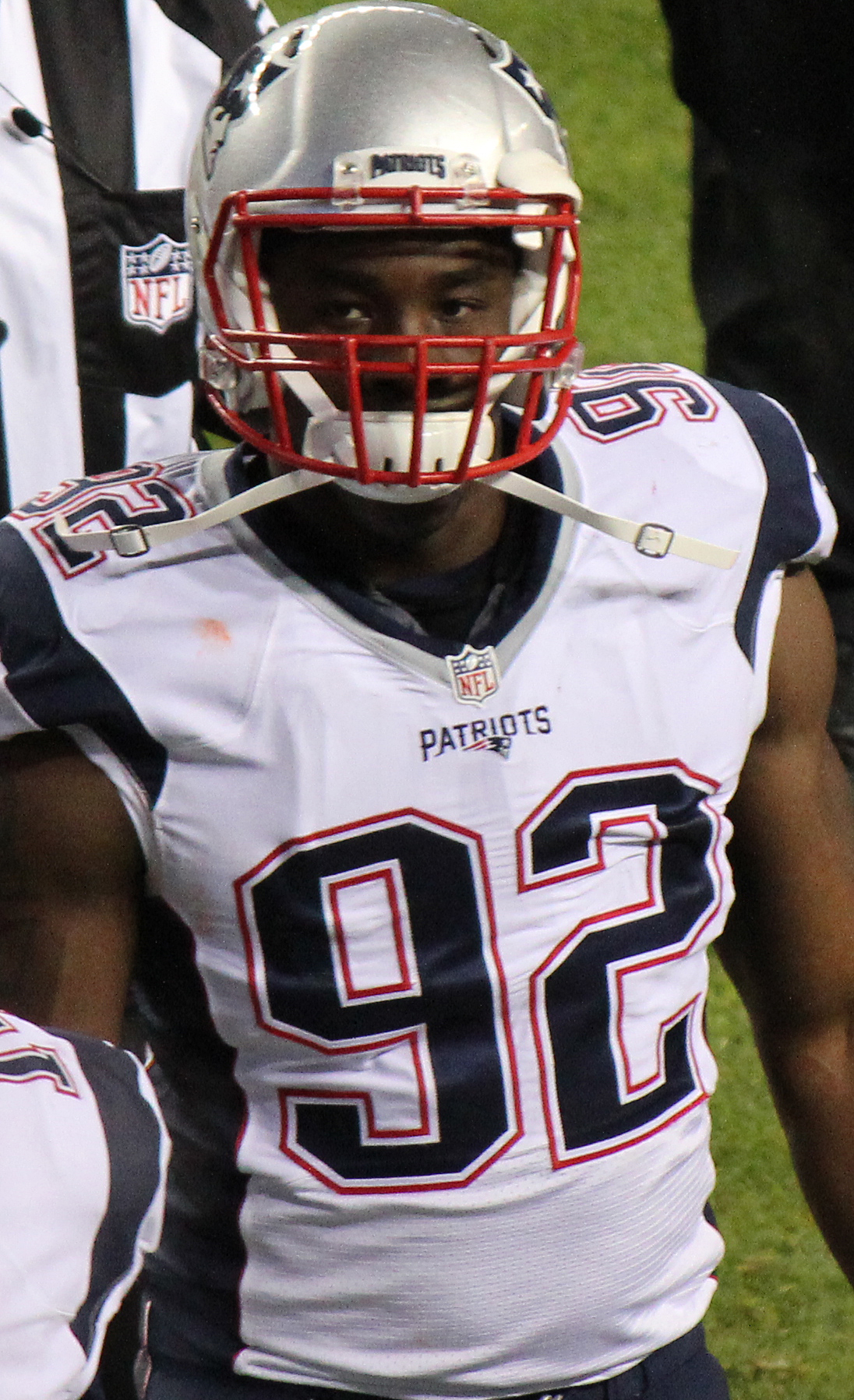
- Grissom with the New England Patriots in 2015

No. 92, 75, 96
- Position: Defensive end

Personal information
- Born: June 4, 1992 (age 34); Hutchinson, Kansas, U.S.
- Listed height: 6 ft 4 in (1.93 m)
- Listed weight: 265 lb (120 kg)

Career information
- High school: Hutchinson
- College: Oklahoma
- NFL draft: 2015: 3rd round, 97th overall pick

Career history
- New England Patriots (2015–2018); Indianapolis Colts (2018); New Orleans Saints (2019)*
- * Offseason or practice squad member only

Awards and highlights
- Super Bowl champion (LI)

Career NFL statistics
- Total tackles: 14
- Sacks: 1.0
- Stats at Pro Football Reference

Geneo Grissom (born June 4, 1992) is an American former professional football player who was a defensive end in the National Football League (NFL). He played college football for the Oklahoma Sooners. He was selected by the New England Patriots in the third round of the 2015 NFL draft.

== College career ==
After redshirting in 2010 with the Sooners, Grissom played as a reserve defensive tackle in 2011 and 2012, picking up 9 total tackles and one tackle for a loss.

In 2013, Grissom saw his first career start come against ULM Warhawks in which he recorded two tackles. His first interception came on October 12 against the Texas Longhorns, which he returned 54 yards for a touchdown. In the Sugar Bowl against Alabama, Grissom recorded 2.5 sacks, broke up a pass, and recovered two fumbles. He returned one of these fumbles for an eight-yard touchdown and had a total of 34 return yards.

As a senior at Oklahoma in 2014, Grissom was named an honorable mention for the All-Big 12 Conference after recording 39 tackles and 3.5 sacks on the year. Over his four seasons at Oklahoma, he registered 88 tackles, 8 sacks, 2 forced fumbles, 3 fumble recoveries and 2 interceptions while playing in 39 games with 12 starts.

== Professional career ==
=== Pre-draft ===
On November 10, 2014, it was announced that Grissom had accepted his invitation to play in the 2015 Senior Bowl. On January 24, 2015, Grissom appeared in the Senior Bowl for Jacksonville Jaguars Gus Bradley's South team and assisted on three tackles during their 34–13 loss. He was one of 33 collegiate linebackers to attend the NFL Scouting Combine in Indianapolis, Indiana. Grissom performed all of the combine drills and finished fifth among all linebackers in the vertical jump, sixth in the bench press, tied for 14th in the broad jump and three-cone drill, and 20th in the 40-yard dash. On March 11, 2015, he participated at Oklahoma's pro day and opted to perform nearly all of the combine drills again. Unfortunately, he was unable to have a better performance, but was able to impress team representatives and scouts in positional drills. He also showed his versatility and athleticism by also taking part in tight end drills at Oklahoma's pro day. New England Patriots' head coach Bill Belichick stated that Grissom's tight end drills were, "As good as we saw all year." At the conclusion of the pre-draft process, Grissom was projected to be a fifth or sixth round pick by NFL draft experts and scouts. he was ranked the 18th best outside linebacker prospect in the draft by NFLDraftScout.com.

Pre-draft measurables
Height	Weight	Arm length	Hand span	40-yard dash	10-yard split	20-yard split	20-yard shuttle	Three-cone drill	Vertical jump	Broad jump	Bench press
6 ft 3 3/8 in (1.91 m)	262 lb (119 kg)	33 3/8 in (0.85 m)	10 1/4 in (0.26 m)	4.81 s	1.65 s	2.78 s	4.38 s	7.24 s	37 in (0.94 m)	9 ft 9 in (2.97 m)	20 reps
All values from NFL Combine

=== New England Patriots ===
==== 2015 ====
The New England Patriots selected Grissom in the third round (97th overall) of the 2015 NFL draft. He was the 14th defensive end selected in 2015. Belichick also stated Grissom could possibly play interior defensive line positions. On May 9, 2015, the Patriots signed Grissom to a four-year, $2.89 million contract that included a signing bonus of $581,948.

Throughout training camp, he competed against Michael Buchanan, Jake Bequette, Zach Moore, and Xzavier Dickson. He was named the third right defensive end on the Patriots' depth chart to begin the regular season, behind Rob Ninkovich and Jabaal Sheard.

He made his professional regular season debut in the Patriots' season-opener against the Pittsburgh Steelers and assisted on one tackle during their 28–21 victory. He made his first career tackle with teammate Alan Branch on Steelers' running back DeAngelo Williams after he ran for a six-yard gain in the first quarter. On October 29, 2015, Grissom recorded a season-high two combined tackles as the Patriots routed the Miami Dolphins 36–7. On January 1, 2016, Grissom made one solo tackle and his first career sack on Dolphins' quarterback Ryan Tannehill in New England's 20–10 loss to the Dolphins. He was mainly used on special teams and as a reserve on defense his rookie season. Grissom finished the season with six combined tackles (three solo) and one sack in 14 games. The Patriots finished the 2015 season atop the AFC East with a 12–4 record. Grissom was inactive throughout the playoffs as the Patriots went on to lose in the AFC Championship to the eventual Super Bowl 50 Champions the Denver Broncos.

==== 2016 ====
He competed with Chris Long, Trey Flowers, and Frank Kearse throughout training camp for a backup defensive end role. On September 3, 2016, he was released by the Patriots as part of final roster cuts and was signed to the practice squad the next day. He was promoted to the active roster on October 15, 2016. On November 27, 2016, Grissom assisted on two tackles during a 22–17 victory against the New York Jets.

On January 14, 2017, he appeared in his first career playoff game during a 34–16 victory over the Houston Texans in the AFC Divisional round.

==== 2017 ====
Grissom was released by the Patriots on September 2, 2017 and was signed to the practice squad the next day. He was promoted to the active roster on September 22, 2017. He was released by the Patriots on November 9, 2017 and was re-signed to the practice squad. He was promoted back to the active roster on December 2, 2017.

==== 2018 ====
On November 6, 2018, Grissom was waived by the Patriots.

=== Indianapolis Colts ===
On January 1, 2019, Grissom was signed by the Indianapolis Colts.

=== New Orleans Saints ===
On May 13, 2019, Grissom signed with the New Orleans Saints. He was released during final roster cuts on August 30, 2019.

== Personal life ==
On July 20, 2015, Grissom married his college sweetheart Haley Eastham. They have a dog named Nyla. The couple appeared in the House Hunters episode "Wow Factor in Dallas", which premiered on January 28, 2021.
