= Dee Hart =

American football player (born 1992)

No. 1, 10
- Position: Running back

Personal information
- Born: August 16, 1992 (age 34); Avon Park, Florida, U.S.
- Listed height: 5 ft 7 in (1.70 m)
- Listed weight: 199 lb (90 kg)

Career information
- High school: Dr. Phillips (Orlando, Florida)
- College: Colorado State; Alabama
- NFL draft: 2015: undrafted

Career history
- Miami Dolphins (2015)*
- * Offseason or practice squad member only

Awards and highlights
- BCS national champion (2012, 2013); Second-team All-MWC (2014)

Demetrius "Dee" Hart (born August 16, 1992) is an American former professional football running back. He played college football at Alabama and Colorado State.

== High school ==
Hart attended Dr. Phillips High School in Orlando, Florida, where he played football and ran track. He was teammates with Ha Ha Clinton-Dix and earned a 2010 USA Today High School All-American nomination, the Class 6A Player of the Year award from Florida Dairy Farmers and was the runner-up for Mr. Football. Hart graduated early in January 2010 after setting 23 school records, as well as the Florida high school state record for touchdowns in a season (50). Hart also won the 2010 Hall Trophy for the best High School football player in the nation.

In track & field, Hart competed as a sprinter and long jumper during his sophomore season. He posted bests of 11.19 seconds in the 100-meter dash, 23.28 seconds in the 200-meter dash and 6.82 meters (22-3) in the long jump, but still was not the fastest.

=== Recruiting ===
Regarded as a five-star recruit by Rivals.com, Hart was rated as the No. 1 all-purpose back prospect in the class of 2011. After committing to Michigan in October 2010, he switched his commitment to Alabama in January 2011.

== College career ==
On February 16, 2014, Hart was arrested for giving false information and for marijuana possession. In summer 2014, Hart graduated from Alabama with a degree in criminal justice and transferred to Colorado State, where he was able to start immediately and have two years of eligibility remaining with the Rams. In his only season at Colorado State, he rushed for 1,275 yards on 194 carries with 16 touchdowns.

On January 3, 2015, Hart announced he would forgo his remaining eligibility and enter the 2015 NFL draft.

== Professional career ==
Hart went undrafted in the 2015 NFL draft. The Miami Dolphins invited him for their rookie minicamp tryout, but Hart was cut before the season started.
