= T. J. Yeldon =

American football player (born 1993)

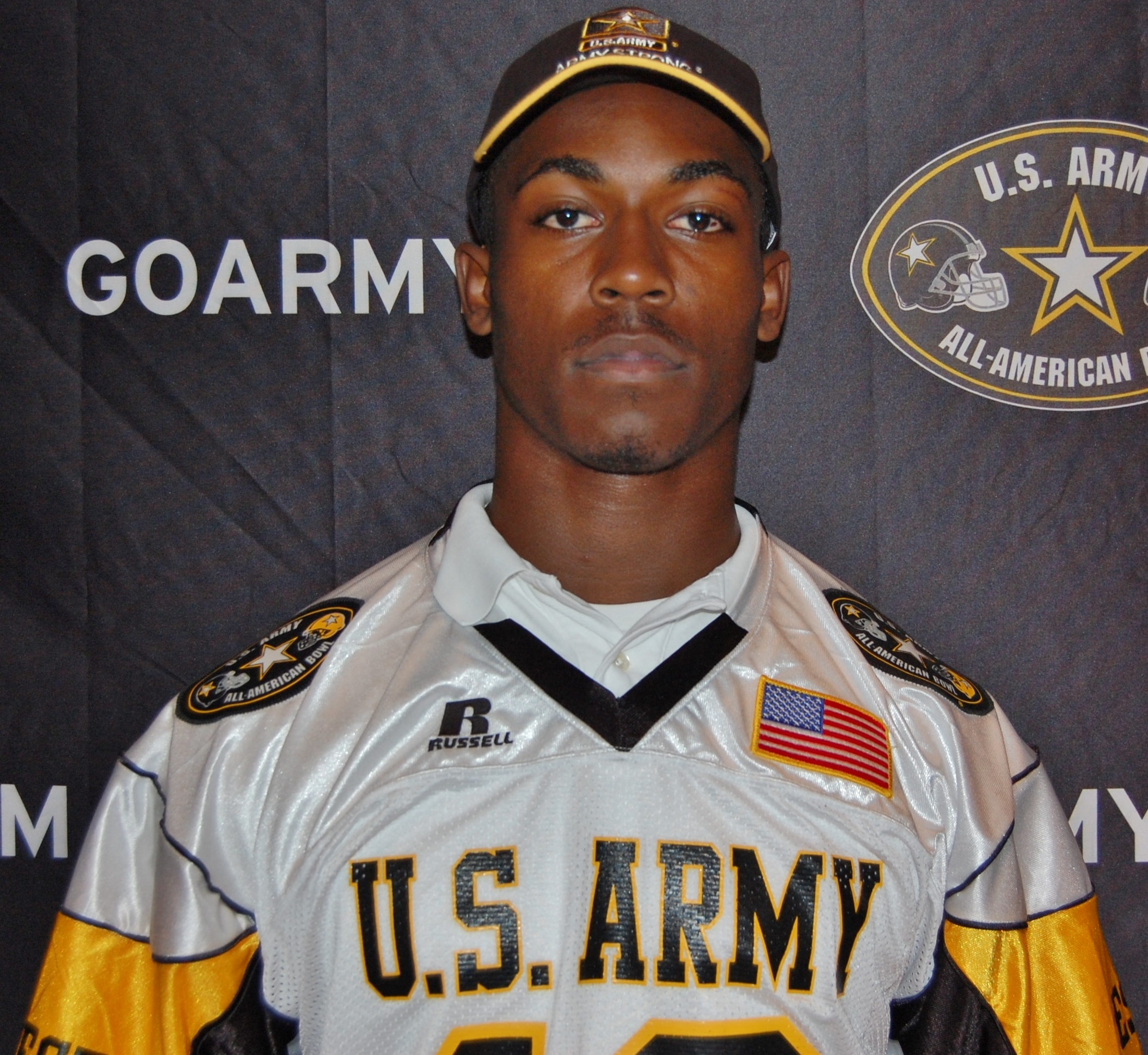
- Yeldon in 2011

No. 24, 22
- Position: Running back

Personal information
- Born: October 2, 1993 (age 33); Daphne, Alabama, U.S.
- Listed height: 6 ft 1 in (1.85 m)
- Listed weight: 223 lb (101 kg)

Career information
- High school: Daphne
- College: Alabama (2012–2014)
- NFL draft: 2015: 2nd round, 36th overall pick

Career history
- Jacksonville Jaguars (2015–2018); Buffalo Bills (2019–2020)

Awards and highlights
- BCS national champion (2012); First-team All-SEC (2013); Second-team All-SEC (2014)

Career NFL statistics
- Rushing yards: 2,005
- Rushing average: 4.1
- Rushing touchdowns: 6
- Receptions: 185
- Receiving yards: 1,448
- Receiving touchdowns: 7
- Stats at Pro Football Reference

Timothy Antonio "T. J." Yeldon Jr. (born October 2, 1993) is an American former professional football player who was a running back in the National Football League (NFL). He played college football for the Alabama Crimson Tide and was selected by the Jacksonville Jaguars in the second round of the 2015 NFL draft.

== Early life ==
Timothy Antonio Yeldon Jr. attended Daphne High School in Daphne, Alabama, where he played football and ran track for the Trojans athletic teams. Yeldon first played varsity football as a freshman in 2008, being called up to play slot receiver and contribute on special teams, and recorded 227 rushing yards and one touchdown as well as 131 receiving yards and a score on the season. As a sophomore, Yeldon had 1,121 yards on 201 carries with 34 catches for 361 yards and one touchdown. He rushed for 148 yards on 24 carries and scored twice in a 41–19 upset of C. J. Mosley's Theodore Bobcats in the first round of the playoffs.

As a junior, Yeldon totaled 1,112 yards and 18 scores on the ground while also catching a career-best 34 passes for 504 yards and five touchdowns. Daphne finished the year with an unbeaten 15–0 record and the 2010 Alabama 6A State Championship, beating the defending champions Hoover Buccaneers, who were on a 21-game winning streak, in the final. Yeldon scored the winning touchdown off a one-yard run with 11 minutes of play remaining.

As a senior, Yeldon rushed for 2,193 yards on 232 carries with 31 touchdowns and won the Alabama Mr. Football Award over Hueytown's Jameis Winston, becoming the first running back to win the award since Cadillac Williams in 2000. Yeldon was also named a first-team All-State selection by the Alabama Sports Writers Association and second-team USA Today High School All-American. Daphne finished with a 10–2 record, finishing the season with a 3–13 loss to Prattville in the 6A playoffs.

Yeldon was also on the school's track team, where he competed as a sprinter and jumper. At the prelims of the 2010 Lionell Newell Track Meet, he ran a career-best time of 11.35 seconds in the 100 meters, placing 12th overall in the finals. He also placed 6th in the long jump at the 2010 McGill-Toolen Invitational, with a personal-best mark of 6.08 meters.

Regarded as a five-star recruit by Rivals.com, Yeldon was listed as the No. 2 running back prospect in his class, behind only Johnathan Gray. Understandably, he had scholarship offers from almost every football powerhouse, including Florida, Oregon, Penn State, and Tennessee. In June 2011, Yeldon verbally committed to Auburn. However, after the end of his senior season, he switched to Auburn's in-state rival Alabama, citing uncertainty over the Tigers' offensive coordinator position following Gus Malzahn's move to Arkansas State. Yeldon enrolled at Alabama in January 2012, right after the 2012 U.S. Army All-American Bowl.

== College career ==
As a true freshman in 2012, Yeldon played in all 14 games, sharing time with Eddie Lacy. In his first college game, Yeldon rushed for 111 yards and a touchdown. His season high for the year was 153 yards against Georgia in the 2012 SEC Championship Game. In the 2013 BCS Championship Game victory over Notre Dame, Yeldon ran for 110 yards and had one touchdown. Yeldon finished the season with 1,108 rushing yards on 175 carries and 12 touchdowns. The 1,108 rushing yards were an Alabama freshman record and his 12 touchdowns tied Mark Ingram II's freshman touchdown record.

After Lacy entered the 2013 NFL draft, Yeldon became Alabama's starter his sophomore season in 2013. He started 11 of 12 games, missing one game due to injury. Yeldon led the team with 1,235 yards on 207 carries and 14 touchdowns. He was named first-team All-Southeastern Conference (SEC) selection. Yeldon shared carries with Derrick Henry his junior season in 2014. He played in 13 games, rushing for 979 yards on 194 carries with 11 touchdowns.

After his junior season, Yeldon decided to forego his senior season and entered the 2015 NFL draft.

== Professional career ==
Pre-draft measurables
Height	Weight	Arm length	Hand span	40-yard dash	10-yard split	20-yard split	20-yard shuttle	Three-cone drill	Vertical jump	Broad jump	Bench press
6 ft 1 1/4 in (1.86 m)	226 lb (103 kg)	31 5/8 in (0.80 m)	9 in (0.23 m)	4.52 s	1.57 s	2.56 s	4.22 s	7.19 s	36.0 in (0.91 m)	9 ft 9 in (2.97 m)	22 reps
All values from NFL Combine, except 40-yard dash from Pro Day

=== Jacksonville Jaguars ===
==== 2015 season ====
Yeldon was selected by the Jacksonville Jaguars in the second round with the 36th overall pick in the 2015 NFL Draft. He was the third running back to be selected that year. On May 27, 2015, Yeldon signed a four-year, $5.91 million contract, with a $2.56 million signing bonus, and $3.26 million guaranteed.

Jaguars head coach Gus Bradley named Yeldon the starting running back for the beginning of the season, ahead of veterans Denard Robinson, Toby Gerhart, and Bernard Pierce. On September 13, 2015, he made his NFL debut and had 15 carries for 51 yards to go along with three receptions for 16 yards, in a 20–9 loss to the Carolina Panthers. In the next game against the Miami Dolphins, Yeldon had a season-high 25 carries for 70 yards in a 23–20 victory. Three weeks later, he had 11 carries for 32 yards to go along with five receptions for 31 yards and his first NFL touchdown in a 38–31 loss to the Tampa Bay Buccaneers.

After five consecutive starts to begin his rookie campaign, Yeldon missed the Week 6 matchup against the Houston Texans due to a groin injury. He returned as the starter on October 25, rushing for season-high 115 yards on 15 carries and scored his first career rushing touchdown in a 34–31 victory over the Buffalo Bills. During Week 14 against the Indianapolis Colts, he had 11 carries for 62 yards but left the game with an MCL sprain that would keep him out the following week.

==== 2016 season ====
Yeldon remained part of the Jaguars' backfield in the 2016 season. In the season opener against the Green Bay Packers, he had 21 carries for 39 yards and a touchdown in the 27–23 loss. Overall, Yeldon finished the 2016 season with 130 carries for 465 yards and a touchdown to go along with 50 receptions for 312 yards and a touchdown. He was placed on injured reserve on December 26, 2016.

==== 2017 season ====
After being a healthy scratch for the first six weeks of the season, on October 22, during Week 7 against the Indianapolis Colts, because of an injury to Leonard Fournette, Yeldon rushed for 122 yards, which highlighted a 58-yard touchdown, as the Jaguars shut out the Colts 27–0. Overall, he finished the regular season with 49 carries for 253 yards and two touchdowns to go along with 30 receptions for 224 yards. The Jaguars finished the season atop the AFC South and made the playoffs. In the Divisional Round against the Pittsburgh Steelers, Yeldon rushed for 20 yards and a touchdown to go along with 57 receiving yards during the 45–42 road victory. During the AFC Championship Game against the New England Patriots, he had 25 rushing yards in the 24–20 road loss.

==== 2018 season ====
Yeldon started the 2018 season with 51 rushing yards and three receptions for 18 yards and a receiving touchdown in the 20–15 victory over the New York Giants. With Leonard Fournette dealing with an injury, Yeldon had an extended role in the early season. In Week 4 against the New York Jets, he recorded 52 rushing yards, a rushing touchdown, 48 receiving yards, and a receiving touchdown in the 31–12 victory. In the following game, a loss to the Kansas City Chiefs, he recorded 122 scrimmage yards and a receiving touchdown. In Week 17, Yeldon was active but did not see any action. He and an inactive Fournette showed enough disinterest on the sideline that Jaguars Executive Vice President of Football Operations Tom Coughlin issued a statement calling the duo's behavior “disrespectful, selfish … unbecoming that of a professional football player.”

Yeldon finished the 2018 season with 104 carries for 414 yards and a touchdown to go along with 55 receptions for 487 yards and four touchdowns in 14 games and five starts.

=== Buffalo Bills ===
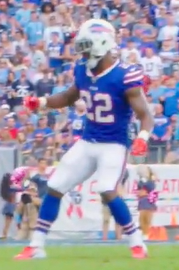
Yeldon in 2019

On April 22, 2019, Yeldon signed a two-year contract with the Buffalo Bills. In the 2019 season, Yeldon appeared in six games and recorded 17 carries for 63 yards to go along with 13 receptions for 124 yards.

Yeldon was placed on the reserve/COVID-19 list by the Bills on December 27, 2020, and was activated 10 days later. Yeldon played in three games for the Bills in 2020, recording 10 carries for 70 yards to go along with a 22-yard touchdown reception.

== Career statistics ==
=== NFL ===
==== Regular season ====
Year	Team	Games		Rushing					Receiving					Fumbles	
Year	Team	GP	GS	Att	Yds	Avg	Lng	TD	Rec	Yds	Avg	Lng	TD	Fum	Lost
2015	JAX	12	12	182	740	4.1	45	2	36	279	7.8	67	1	0	0
2016	JAX	15	13	130	465	3.6	16	1	50	312	6.2	17	1	2	1
2017	JAX	10	0	49	253	5.2	58T	2	30	224	7.5	20	0	2	1
2018	JAX	14	5	104	414	4.0	20	1	55	487	8.9	37	4	1	1
2019	BUF	6	0	17	63	3.7	12	0	13	124	9.5	37	0	1	1
2020	BUF	3	0	10	70	7.0	34	0	1	22	22.0	22	1	1	0
Career		60	30	492	2,005	4.1	58	6	185	1,448	7.8	67	7	7	4

==== Postseason ====
Year	Team	Games		Rushing					Receiving					Fumbles	
Year	Team	GP	GS	Att	Yds	Avg	Lng	TD	Rec	Yds	Avg	Lng	TD	Fum	Lost
2017	JAX	2	0	10	45	4.5	12	1	5	63	12.6	40	0	0	0
2019	BUF	0	0	DNP											
2020	BUF	2	0	5	19	3.8	7	0	4	41	10.3	20	0	0	0
Career		4	0	15	64	4.3	12	1	9	104	11.6	20	0	0	0

=== College ===
Season	Team	Rushing					Receiving		
Season	Team	Att	Yds	Avg	Lng	TD	Rec	Yds	TD
2012	Alabama	175	1,108	6.3	43	12	11	131	1
2013	Alabama	207	1,235	6.0	68	14	20	183	0
2014	Alabama	194	979	5.0	31	11	15	180	1
Career		576	3,322	5.8	68	37	46	494	2

== Personal life ==
Yeldon is a distant cousin of former West Virginia quarterback and Miami Dolphins wide receiver Pat White.
