= Cade Foster =

American football player (born 1991)

No. 43
- Position: Placekicker

Personal information
- Born: March 10, 1991 (age 35); Southlake, Texas, U.S.
- Listed height: 6 ft 1 in (1.85 m)
- Listed weight: 221 lb (100 kg)

Career information
- High school: Southlake (TX) Carroll
- College: University of Alabama (2010–2014)

Awards and highlights
- BCS national champion (2012, 2013); SEC champion (2012)

Cade Foster (born March 10, 1991) is an American former college football placekicker. He played for the Alabama Crimson Tide. He later completed law school, and is now the County Attorney for McCracken County in Kentucky.

== Early life ==
Foster attended Southlake Carroll High School in Southlake, Texas, where he made 38-of-48 field goals during his high school football career. He also started at middle linebacker and finished with 106 tackles, including six tackles for loss and six sacks.

== College career ==
Foster attended the University of Alabama from 2010–2013 under head coach Nick Saban. As a freshman in 2010, he made 7-of-9 field goals and 7-of-7 extra points; his misses were from 44 and 54 yards. Foster, a former linebacker, made 9 special teams tackles and 1 forced fumbles. Alabama typically used him on kickoffs and long field goals over 44 yards long due to his strong leg, while fellow kicker Jeremy Shelley handled the other duties. As a sophomore, he received negative attention after missing three long field goal attempts against LSU in a game Alabama lost in overtime, leading him to close his Facebook account.

As a senior, Foster took over the full-time kicking duties and hit a career-long 53-yarder against Ole Miss. He received further negative attention after he missed all three field goals (one of which was blocked) during the 2013 Iron Bowl, which Alabama lost after Foster's replacement, Adam Griffith, left his 57-yard attempt short at the end of regulation and it was returned for a game-winning touchdown by Auburn. However, Foster received a letter of support from an unlikely source, former president George W. Bush, which he posted on his Twitter and Instagram accounts.

== After football ==
After his collegiate football career, Foster attended the University of Alabama School of Law. He was elected County Attorney for McCracken County, Kentucky in 2022.
