= William Daniel =

William Daniel may refer to:

- William Daniel (bishop) (died 1628), Church of Ireland archbishop
- William Daniel (judge) (1806–1873), Virginia jurist
- William Daniel (Maryland politician) (1826–1897), American politician
- William Daniel (died 1633), English Member of Parliament for Truro, 1601
- William B. Daniel (1840–1921), American politician in the Virginia House of Delegates
- William Barker Daniel (1754–1833), Church of England clergyman and writer on field sports
- William D. S. Daniel (1903–1988), Assyrian author, poet and musician
- Willie Daniel (1937–2015), American football player
- William Chase Daniel (born 1986), American former football quarterback

== See also ==
- Bill Daniel (disambiguation)
- William Daniell (disambiguation)
- William Daniels (disambiguation)
