= Quinn Ewers =

American football player (born 2003)

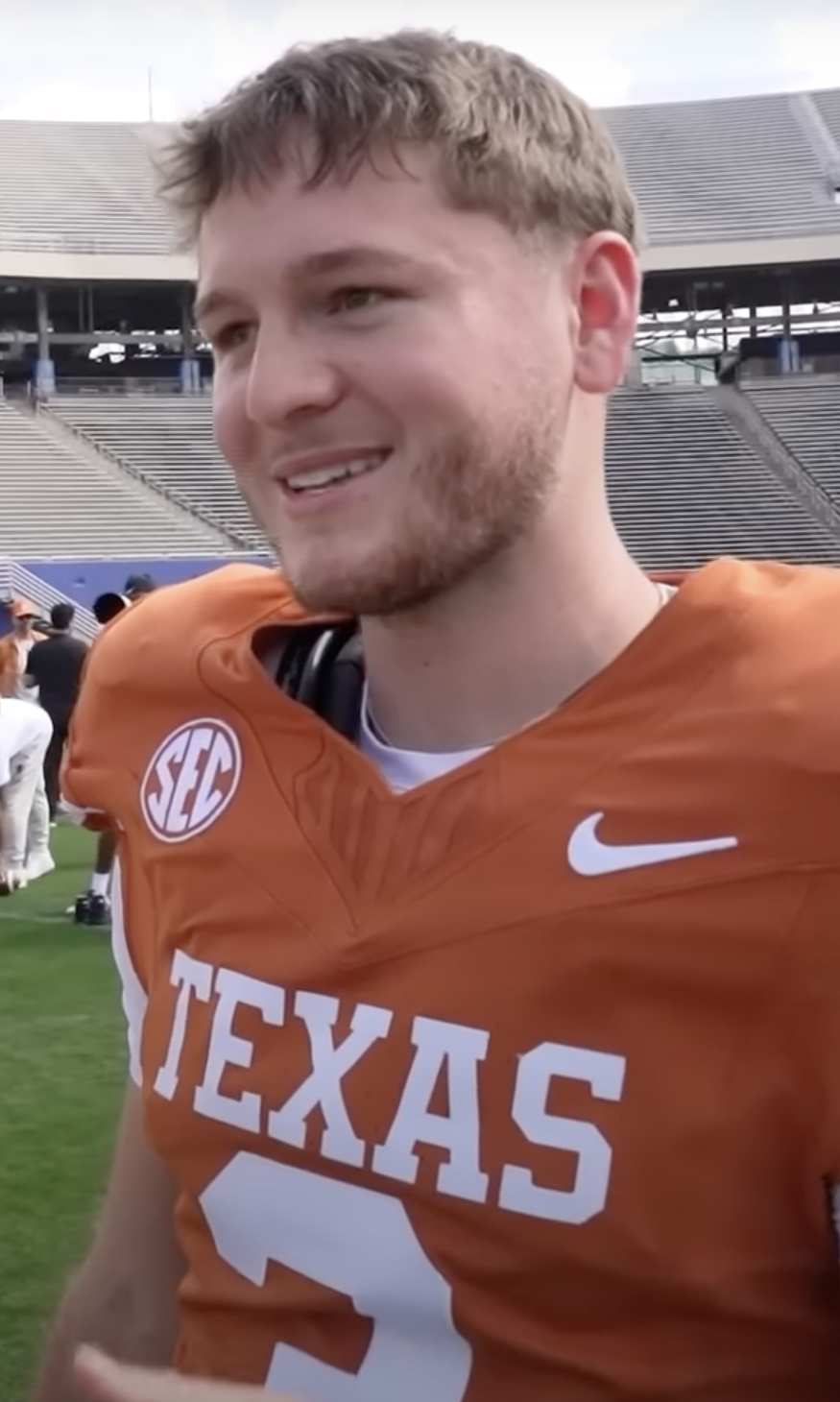
- Ewers with the Texas Longhorns in 2024

No. 10 – Jacksonville Jaguars
- Position: Quarterback
- Roster status: Active

Personal information
- Born: March 15, 2003 (age 23); San Antonio, Texas, U.S.
- Listed height: 6 ft 2 in (1.88 m)
- Listed weight: 209 lb (95 kg)

Career information
- High school: Carroll Senior (Southlake, Texas)
- College: Ohio State (2021); Texas (2022–2024)
- NFL draft: 2025: 7th round, 231st overall pick

Career history
- Miami Dolphins (2025); Jacksonville Jaguars (2026–present)

Awards and highlights
- Second-team All-SEC (2024); Second-team All-Big 12 (2023)

Career NFL statistics as of Week 8, 2026
- Passing attempts: 86
- Passing completions: 56
- Completion percentage: 65.1%
- TD–INT: 3–3
- Passing yards: 630
- Passer rating: 84
- Rushing yards: 19
- Stats at Pro Football Reference

Quinn Tucker Ewers (YOO-ərs; born March 15, 2003) is an American professional football quarterback for the Jacksonville Jaguars of the National Football League (NFL). He played college football for the Ohio State Buckeyes and Texas Longhorns. Ewers was selected by the Miami Dolphins in the seventh round of the 2025 NFL draft.

== Early life ==
Ewers was born on March 15, 2003, in San Antonio, Texas. He spent his early years in Pleasanton, Texas, before his family moved to Southlake, Texas, when he was eight. Ewers attended Carroll Senior High School, where he played football under coach Riley Dodge and also previously played baseball. As a sixth grader, he was offered a football scholarship by Graham Harrell.

As a high school sophomore, he completed 291 of 402 passes for 3,998 yards with 45 touchdowns against three interceptions. Ewers and Southlake Carroll advanced to the Texas 6A Division I quarterfinals before being defeated by Duncanville. Ewers finished his junior season with 2,442 yards and 28 touchdown passes in eight games, missing six games due to injury, as Carroll advanced to the 6A Division I Texas State Championship Game before losing to Westlake High School led by fellow five star recruit and future Clemson quarterback Cade Klubnik. Following the season, he participated in the 2021 Elite 11 competition, but only managed sixth place in the competition.

Going into his senior year, Ewers was considered by multiple outlets to be the top overall recruit in the 2022 recruiting class. Ewers initially committed to the Texas Longhorns in August 2020, where he would have been the first quarterback since Vince Young to receive a perfect 1.000 247Sports composite rating. Ewers would later decommit from the Longhorns in October, before committing to play for the Ohio State Buckeyes in November 2020.

== College career ==
=== Ohio State ===
Ewers officially enrolled at Ohio State in August 2021 and joined the team for preseason training camp. Ewers made his debut on November 20, 2021 against the Michigan State Spartans, taking two snaps at the end of the game in the Buckeyes' win.

=== Texas ===
In December 2021, Ewers announced that he was transferring to the University of Texas at Austin to play for the Longhorns. He was named the Longhorns' starting quarterback entering the 2022 season. During the 2023 Big 12 Championship Football Game, Ewers set the record for most passing yards in a single conference championship game for the Big 12 Conference, and was named MVP for the conference title. On January 15, 2025, Ewers announced that he was going to commit to the 2025 NFL draft. He finished his college career with totals of 9,128 passing yards, 68 passing touchdowns, 24 interceptions, and eight rushing touchdowns.

== Professional career ==
Pre-draft measurables
| Height | Weight | Arm length | Hand span | Wingspan |
|---|---|---|---|---|
| 6 ft 2 1/8 in (1.88 m) | 214 lb (97 kg) | 30 3/4 in (0.78 m) | 9 3/8 in (0.24 m) | 6 ft 3 in (1.91 m) |
All values from NFL Combine

=== Miami Dolphins ===
Ewers was selected by the Miami Dolphins with the 231st pick in the 7th round of the 2025 NFL draft. He signed his four-year rookie contract worth $4.33 million.

Ewers began the season as the Dolphins’ 3rd-string, inactive emergency quarterback behind Tua Tagovailoa and Zach Wilson. Prior to Week 7, Ewers was promoted as the Dolphins' backup quarterback, marking his first time on the active game-day roster. That same week, midway through the fourth quarter, Ewers made his NFL debut after Tagovailoa was benched in the Dolphins' 6–31 loss to the Cleveland Browns. Ewers completed five-of-eight passing attempts for 53 yards and was sacked twice in the debut. After Tagovailoa was benched again in Week 15, this time for the rest of the season, Ewers was announced as the starter going forward. In Week 17 against the Tampa Bay Buccaneers, Ewers recorded his first career touchdown on a 63-yard reception by Theo Wease Jr.

=== Jacksonville Jaguars ===
On August 29, 2026, Ewers was traded to the Jacksonville Jaguars in exchange for a 2028 sixth-round pick.

== Career statistics ==
=== NFL ===
| Year | Team | Games | | | Passing | | | | | | | | | Rushing | | | | | Sacks | | Fumbles | |
| Year | Team | GP | GS | Record | Cmp | Att | Pct | Yds | Y/A | Lng | TD | Int | Rtg | Att | Yds | Avg | Lng | TD | Sck | SckY | Fum | Lost |
|---|---|---|---|---|---|---|---|---|---|---|---|---|---|---|---|---|---|---|---|---|---|---|
| 2025 | MIA | 4 | 3 | 1–2 | 55 | 83 | 66.3 | 622 | 7.5 | 63 | 3 | 3 | 85.5 | 8 | 19 | 2.4 | 9 | 0 | 8 | 59 | 3 | 0 |
| 2026 | JAX | 2 | 0 | 0–0 | 1 | 3 | 33.3 | 8 | 2.7 | 8 | 0 | 0 | 42.4 | 0 | 0 | 0.0 | 0 | 0 | 0 | 0 | 0 | 0 |
| Career | | 6 | 3 | 1–2 | 56 | 86 | 65.1 | 630 | 7.3 | 63 | 3 | 3 | 84.0 | 8 | 19 | 2.4 | 9 | 0 | 8 | 59 | 3 | 0 |

=== College ===
| Year | Team | Games | | | Passing | | | | | | | | Rushing | | | |
| Year | Team | GP | GS | Record | Cmp | Att | Pct | Yds | Avg | TD | Int | Rtg | Att | Yds | Avg | TD |
|---|---|---|---|---|---|---|---|---|---|---|---|---|---|---|---|---|
| 2021 | Ohio State | 1 | 0 | 0–0 | 0 | 0 | 0.0 | 0 | 0.0 | 0 | 0 | 0.0 | 0 | 0 | 0.0 | 0 |
| 2022 | Texas | 10 | 10 | 6–4 | 172 | 296 | 58.1 | 2,177 | 7.4 | 15 | 6 | 132.6 | 24 | −52 | −2.2 | 1 |
| 2023 | Texas | 12 | 12 | 10–2 | 272 | 394 | 69.0 | 3,479 | 8.8 | 22 | 6 | 158.6 | 59 | 75 | 1.3 | 5 |
| 2024 | Texas | 14 | 14 | 11–3 | 293 | 445 | 65.8 | 3,472 | 7.8 | 31 | 12 | 149.0 | 57 | −82 | −1.4 | 2 |
| Career | | 37 | 36 | 27–9 | 737 | 1,135 | 64.9 | 9,128 | 8.0 | 68 | 24 | 148.0 | 140 | -59 | -0.4 | 8 |

== Personal life ==
Ewers is notable for being the first amateur athlete to sign a name, image, and likeness (NIL) deal worth over $1 million, doing so with GTSM Sports Marketing. Ewers was one of the cover athletes for EA Sports College Football 25 along with Donovan Edwards and Travis Hunter.
