= Carey Clayton =

American football player (born 1977)

No. 66, 51, 53
- Position: Center

Personal information
- Born: August 31, 1977 (age 49); Dyersburg, Tennessee, U.S.
- Listed height: 6 ft 3 in (1.91 m)
- Listed weight: 285 lb (129 kg)

Career information
- High school: Carroll (Southlake, Texas)
- College: Texas-El Paso (1996–2000)
- NFL draft: 2001: undrafted

Career history
- San Diego Chargers (2001); San Francisco 49ers (2001)*; Jacksonville Jaguars (2002)*; Amsterdam Admirals (2003); Houston Texans (2003)*; Columbus Destroyers (2004); Nashville Kats (2005–2007)
- * Offseason or practice squad member only
- Stats at Pro Football Reference

Carey Arthur Clayton (born August 31, 1977) is an American former professional football center who played one season with the San Diego Chargers of the National Football League (NFL). He played college football at Texas-El Paso. He was also a member of the San Francisco 49ers, Jacksonville Jaguars, and Houston Texans of the NFL, the Amsterdam Admirals of NFL Europe, and the Columbus Destroyers and Nashville Kats of the Arena Football League (AFL).

== Early life and college ==
Carey Arthur Clayton was born on August 31, 1977, in Dyersburg, Tennessee. He participated in football and track at Carroll High School in Southlake, Texas. He graduated in 1996. Clayton was inducted into the Carroll Independent School District Hall of Honor in 2020.

Clayton was a member of the UTEP Miners of the University of Texas at El Paso from 1996 to 2000 and a four-year letterman 1997 to 2000.

== Professional career ==
Clayton signed with the San Diego Chargers on May 16, 2001, after going undrafted in the 2001 NFL draft. He played in one game for the Chargers during the 2001 season before being released on October 30. He was signed to the Chargers' practice squad on November 1 and was later released on November 29, 2001.

Clayton was signed to the practice squad of the San Francisco 49ers on December 5, 2001. He was released on December 31, 2001.

Clayton signed with the Jacksonville Jaguars on January 17, 2002. He was later released on September 1, 2002.

Clayton played in eight games for the Amsterdam Admirals of NFL Europe during the 2003 NFL Europe season.

He signed with the Houston Texans on August 5, 2003, but was released on August 31, 2003.

Clayton was signed by the Columbus Destroyers of the Arena Football League (AFL) on January 31, 2004. He played in all 16 games for the Destroyers during the 2004 AFL season, recording four solo tackles, ten assisted tackles, one forced fumble, and one fumble recovery. The Destroyers finished the season with a 6–10 record. Clayton re-signed with Columbus on June 3, 2004. He was placed on injured reserve on January 24, 2005.

On February 15, 2005, Clayton was traded to the Nashville Kats for defensive specialist Art Smith. He was activated from injured reserve on February 16, 2005, and played in 13 games for the Kats during the 2005 season, posting three solo tackles and five assisted tackles. He appeared in all 16 games in 2006, totaling three solo tackles, one assisted tackle, one pass breakup, and one fumble recovery. The Kats finished the 2006 season with an 8–8 record and lost in the wildcard round of the playoffs to the Chicago Rush. Clayton played in eight games in 2007, recording three solo tackles and one fumble recovery.
