= Justin Drescher =

American football player (born 1988)

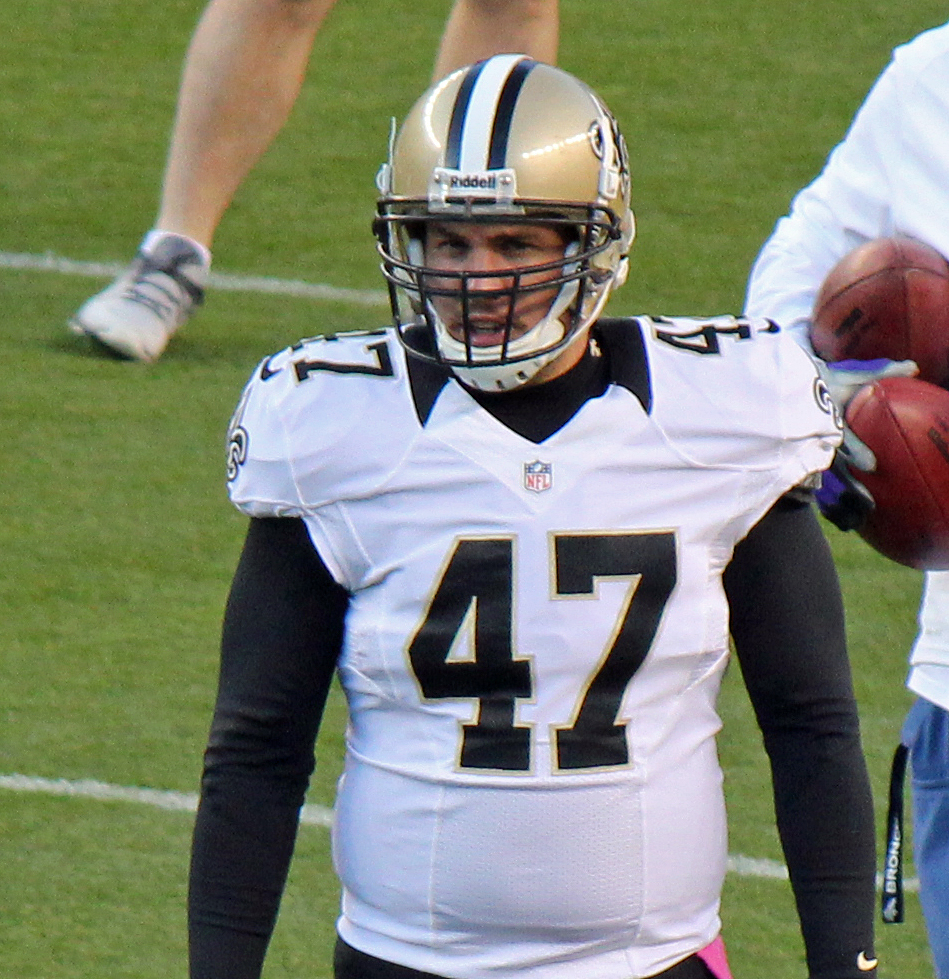
- Drescher in 2012

No. 47, 49
- Position: Long snapper

Personal information
- Born: January 1, 1988 (age 38); Colorado Springs, Colorado, U.S.
- Listed height: 6 ft 1 in (1.85 m)
- Listed weight: 235 lb (107 kg)

Career information
- High school: Southlake Carroll (Southlake, Texas)
- College: Colorado
- NFL draft: 2010: undrafted

Career history
- Atlanta Falcons (2010)*; New Orleans Saints (2010−2016); Arizona Cardinals (2017)
- * Offseason or practice squad member only

Career NFL statistics
- Games played: 110
- Total tackles: 4
- Stats at Pro Football Reference

Justin Drescher (born January 1, 1988) is an American former professional football player who was a long snapper for eight seasons in the National Football League (NFL). He played college football for the Colorado Buffaloes. He was signed by the Atlanta Falcons as an undrafted free agent in 2010. He was a member of the New Orleans Saints for seven seasons.

== Professional career ==
Pre-draft measurables
Height	Weight	40-yard dash	10-yard split	20-yard split	20-yard shuttle	Three-cone drill	Vertical jump	Broad jump	Bench press
6 ft 5/8 in (1.84 m)	245 lb (111 kg)	5.39 s	1.80 s	3.12 s	4.62 s	7.60 s	27 1/2 in (0.70 m)	8 ft 1 in (2.46 m)	14 reps
All values from Pro Day workout on March 10, 2010

=== Atlanta Falcons ===
Drescher was signed by the Atlanta Falcons as an undrafted free agent following the 2010 NFL draft on April 26, 2010. He was waived prior to the start of training camp on June 15.

=== New Orleans Saints ===
Drescher was signed by the New Orleans Saints on November 22, 2010, after long snapper Jake Ingram was waived by the team following a botched snap. Drescher played in six games for the Saints in 2010.

Drescher re-signed with the Saints on August 6, 2017. He was released by the Saints on August 30, 2017, after the team traded for Jon Dorenbos.

While with the Saints, he was teammates with placekicker Garrett Hartley and holder Chase Daniel, all of whom went to Carroll Senior High School. On December 23, 2012, the trio connected on a game-winning field goal in overtime against the Dallas Cowboys.

=== Arizona Cardinals ===
On October 10, 2017, Drescher signed with the Arizona Cardinals. On December 11, 2017, Drescher was released by the Cardinals after Aaron Brewer was ready to return from injured reserve.
