= Matt Canterino =

Free agent
- Pitcher
- Born: December 14, 1997 (age 28); Southlake, Texas, U.S.
- Bats: Left Throws: Right
- Stats at Baseball Reference

Matthew James Canterino (born December 14, 1997) is an American professional baseball pitcher who is a free agent.

== Amateur career ==
Canterino grew up in Southlake, Texas and attended Carroll Senior High School. He was named the District 7-6A Pitcher of the Year as a senior after posting 7–1 record with 57 strikeouts and an 0.64 ERA.

Canterino played college baseball for the Rice Owls, where he was a starting pitcher for three seasons. He was named first team All-Conference USA after going 7–5 with 3.06 ERA and 116 strikeouts against 22 walks in 94 innings. As a junior, he went 6–5 with a 2.81 ERA and 121 strikeouts in 99 1/3 innings pitched and was named the Conference USA Pitcher of the Year in addition to repeating as a first team all-conference selection. In 2018, he played collegiate summer baseball with the Falmouth Commodores of the Cape Cod Baseball League, and was named a league all-star.

== Professional career ==
Canterino was drafted in the second round, with the 54th overall selection, of the 2019 Major League Baseball draft by the Minnesota Twins. After signing with the team, he was initially assigned to the rookie-level Gulf Coast League Twins before being promoted to the Single-A Cedar Rapids Kernels of the Midwest League. He did not play in a game in 2020 due to cancellation of the minor league season because of the COVID-19 pandemic. He pitched only 23 innings in 2021 for Cedar Rapids and the High-A Fort Myers Mighty Mussels due to injury.

Canterino was assigned to the Double-A Wichita Wind Surge to begin the 2022 season. In 34 1/3 innings pitched, he posted a 1.83 ERA and 1.14 WHIP with 50 strikeouts and 22 walks. On August 10, 2022, it was announced that Canterino would need Tommy John surgery, causing him to miss the remainder of the 2022 season and likely all of the 2023 season. On November 15, the Twins added Canterino to their 40-man roster to protect him from the Rule 5 draft.

Canterino was optioned to Double-A Wichita to begin the 2023 season. However, he did not appear in a game as he continued his recovery from surgery. Canterino was optioned to the Triple–A St. Paul Saints to begin the 2024 season. He missed the entirety of the season due to a rotator cuff strain that he suffered in spring training. Canterino was optioned to Triple-A St. Paul to begin the 2025 season. However, on March 16, 2025, it was announced that Canterino would undergo season-ending surgery to "tighten" ligaments in his throwing shoulder. On April 18, Canterino was designated for assignment by Minnesota. He was released by the Twins on April 22. On April 28, Canterino re-signed with the Twins organization on a two-year minor league contract. He missed the entire 2025 season due to injury. In 2026, he threw one inning of relief with High-A while recovering from injury. He elected free agency on November 2.
