= Senator Barham =

Senator Barham may refer to:

- C. E. Barham (1904–1972), Louisiana State Senate
- Charles C. Barham (1934–2010), Louisiana State Senate
- Edwards Barham (1937–2014), Louisiana State Senate
- Robert J. Barham (born 1949), Louisiana State Senate
- Sidney B. Barham Jr. (1872–1963), Virginia State Senate
