= Bill Daniels (disambiguation) =

Bill Daniels (1920–2000) was an American cable television executive and sports team owner.

Bill Daniels may also refer to:

- Bill Daniels or Robert Vincent Daniels (1926–2010), American historian
- Billy Daniels (1915–1988), American singer
- Billy Daniels (footballer) (born 1994), English footballer

== See also ==
- Bill Daniel (disambiguation)
- William Daniels (disambiguation)
