= Carroll Senior High School =

Public secondary school in Southlake, Texas, United States

Coordinates: 32.941233°N 97.173366°W

Location
- 1501 W. Southlake Blvd; Southlake, Tarrant County, Texas 76092; United States

Information
- School type: Public, Secondary
- Established: 1961
- School district: Carroll Independent School District
- Principal: Shatina Lewis
- Teaching staff: 94.75 (FTE)
- Grades: 11 to 12
- Enrollment: 1,411 (2023–2024)
- Student to teacher ratio: 14.89
- Campus type: Suburban
- Colors: Green, White, and Black
- Athletics conference: UIL Class 6A
- Mascot: Dragon
- Website: Official Website

Carroll Senior High School (commonly known as Southlake Carroll) is a public secondary school in Southlake, Texas, serving students in grades 11 and 12. The school is part of the Carroll Independent School District, serving the majority of the city of Southlake, portions of northwest Grapevine, far northern Colleyville and eastern Westlake.

== History ==
Carroll Senior High School was founded in 1919 as Carroll School, better known at the time as Carroll Hill School, and served students in grades 1-9. In 1959, Carroll became an Independent School District. In 1965, Carroll ISD was fully accredited for primary and secondary education. The original Carroll High School opened in 1970. In 1992, a new campus was opened and served grades 9–12 until the year 2000, when 9th grade was moved to Carroll Junior High School (now Carroll High School) to accommodate growth. In 2002, the school became a true "split campus" when Carroll Junior High School became Carroll High School, serving freshmen and sophomores, and Carroll High School became Carroll Senior High School, serving juniors and seniors.

== Athletics ==
Carroll Dragons sports teams have won 63 state athletic titles, and finished as runner-up 16 times.

The school has also won 10 UIL Lone Star Cups.

- 4A - 2000–01 and 2001–02
- 5A - 2011–12, 2012–13, and 2013–14
- 6A - 2014–15, 2018–19, 2021-2022, 2023-24 and 2025-26

=== Baseball ===
- State Champion: (3A, 1982) (4A, 2002) (6A 2018, 2019, 2022)
- State Runner-Up: (5A, 2008)
- Recent history
  - 2018 - 35–6 season record, 11-0 in the playoffs, won the UIL Class 6A State Championship over San Antonio Reagan.
  - 2019 - 34–11 season record, 12-0 in the playoffs, won the UIL Class 6A State Championship over Missouri City Ridge Point.
  - 2020 - Season canceled due to the COVID-19 pandemic, which made the Dragons unable to compete for a third consecutive state title.
  - 2022 - 34–8 season record, 10-0 in the playoffs, won the UIL Class 6A State Championship over San Antonio Reagan.

=== Football ===
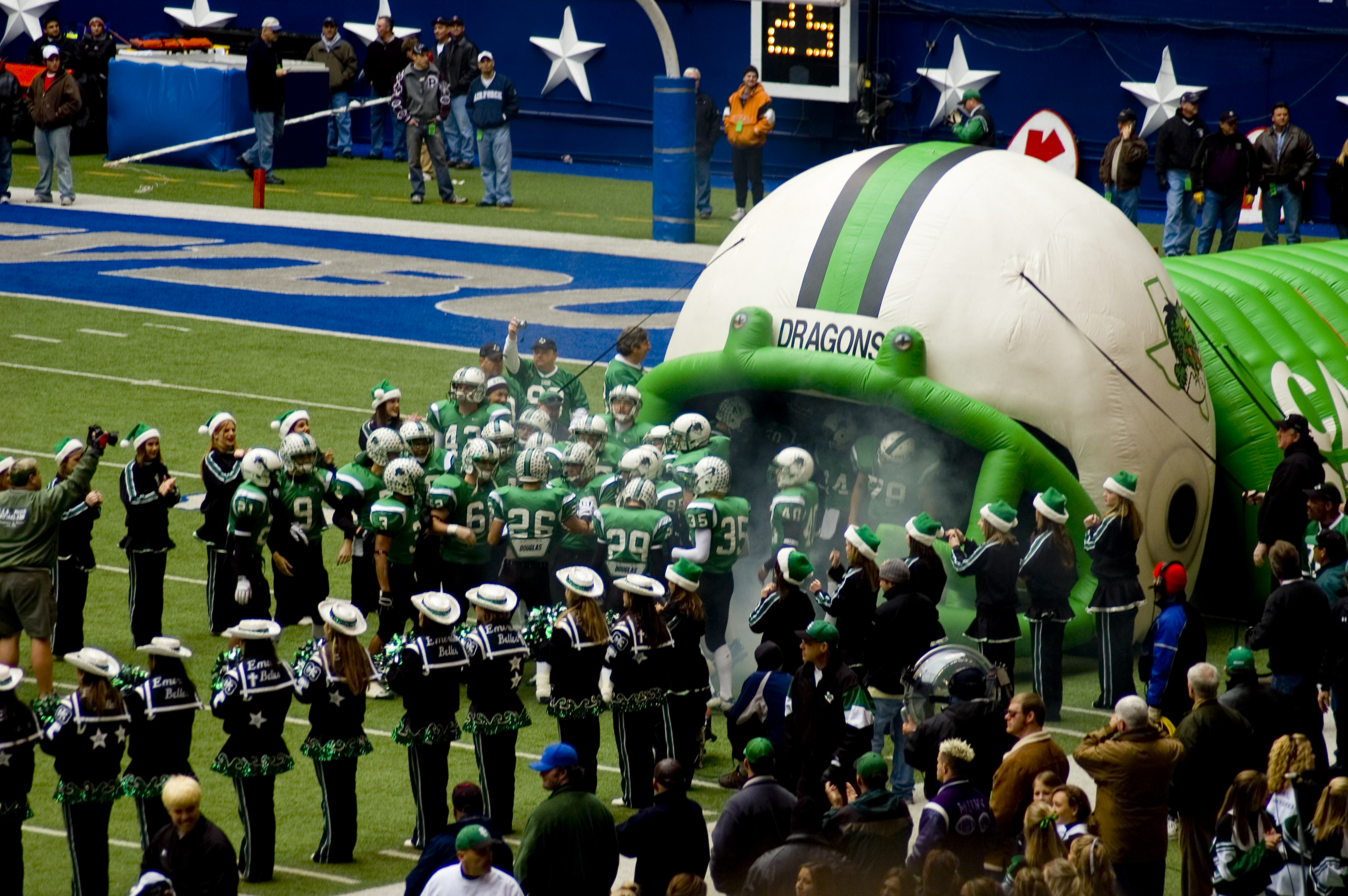
The football team enters the field at Texas Stadium for the 2005 Texas 5A Division II State Championship game, which it won 34–20 against the Katy Tigers

- National champion: 2004, 2005, 2006
- State champion: (3A, 1988, 1992, 1993) (5A II, 2002, 2004, 2005) (5A I, 2006, 2011)
- State runner-up: (5A II, 2003) (6A I, 2020) (6A II, 2024)

Since 1987, the Southlake Carroll Dragons football team has been one of the premier high school programs in Texas. In the 37 seasons between 1987 and 2022, the team has reached the state quarterfinals 26 times, the final four 19 times, the finals 11 times, and won the state championship eight times, posting an overall record 440-69-2 in that time. Several final season national rankings, including MaxPreps and CalPreps, listed Carroll as the number one team in the nation in 2004, 2005, and 2006. Nine players from Carroll have played professionally in the NFL.

Football Records Table
| | State champion | | | | | | |
| | State finalist | | | | | | |
| | State semifinalist | | | | | | |
| | State quarterfinalist | | | | | | |
| Season | Conf | Dist | Coach | Overall record | District record | Playoff record | UIL Ref |
| 1963 | | | | 2–7 | | | |
| 1964 | B | 17 | Max Boydston (18–4) | 8–2 | | | |
| 1965 | B | 17 | Max Boydston (18–4) | 10–2 | | 1–1 | |
| 1966 | 1A | 12 | A.O. (Buddy); Hintzman (19–10–1) | 7–3 | | | |
| 1967 | 1A | 12 | A.O. (Buddy); Hintzman (19–10–1) | 8–2 | | | |
| 1968 | 1A | 12 | A.O. (Buddy); Hintzman (19–10–1) | 4–5–1 | | | |
| 1969 | 1A | 12 | John Lowery | 0–10 | | | |
| 1970 | 1A | 11 | Max Boydston (26–16–1) | 4–6 | | | |
| 1971 | 1A | 11 | Max Boydston (26–16–1) | 6–4 | | | |
| 1972 | 1A | 13 | Max Boydston (26–16–1) | 8–2 | | | |
| 1973 | 1A | 13 | Max Boydston (26–16–1) | 8–1–1 | | | |
| 1974 | 1A | 12 | Jim McGuire (10–9–1) | 6–3–1 | | | |
| 1975 | 1A | 12 | Jim McGuire (10–9–1) | 4–6 | | | |
| 1976 | 1A | 15 | Bill Branum (20–11) | 6–4 | | | |
| 1977 | 1A | 15 | Bill Branum (20–11) | 5–5 | | | |
| 1978 | 1A | 15 | Bill Branum (20–11) | 9–2 | | 0–1 | |
| 1979 | 1A | 15 | Bob Ledbetter (179–33–3) | 9–2 | | 0–1 | |
| 1980 | 2A | 15 | Bob Ledbetter (179–33–3) | 6–3–1 | | | |
| 1981 | 2A | 15 | Bob Ledbetter (179–33–3) | 9–1 | | | |
| 1982 | 2A | 13 | Bob Ledbetter (179–33–3) | 9–4 | | 2–1 | |
| 1983 | 2A | 13 | Bob Ledbetter (179–33–3) | 10–1 | | 0–1 | |
| 1984 | 2A | 10 | Bob Ledbetter (179–33–3) | 6–5 | | 0–1 | |
| 1985 | 2A | 10 | Bob Ledbetter (179–33–3) | 8–2 | | | |
| 1986 | 3A | 9 | Bob Ledbetter (179–33–3) | 10–2 | | 1–1 | |
| 1987 | 3A | 9 | Bob Ledbetter (179–33–3) | 14–1 | | 4–1 | |
| 1988 | 3A | 9 | Bob Ledbetter (179–33–3) | 16–0 | | 6–0 | |
| 1989 | 3A | 9 | Bob Ledbetter (179–33–3) | 12–1 | | 2–1 | |
| 1990 | 3A | 9 | Bob Ledbetter (179–33–3) | 14–1 | | 4–1 | |
| 1991 | 3A | 9 | Bob Ledbetter (179–33–3) | 14–0–1 | | 4–1 | |
| 1992 | 3A | 8 | Bob Ledbetter (179–33–3) | 16–0 | | 6–0 | |
| 1993 | 3A | 8 | Bob Ledbetter (179–33–3) | 16–0 | | 6–0 | |
| 1994 | 4A | 9 | Bob Ledbetter (179–33–3) | 6–5 | | 1–1 | |
| 1995 | 4A | 9 | Bob Ledbetter (179–33–3) | 10–1 | | 0–1 | |
| 1996 | 4A | 9 | Tom Rapp (28–17–1) | 3–6–1 | | | |
| 1997 | 4A | 9 | Tom Rapp (28–17–1) | 7–5 | | | |
| 1998 | 4A II | 11 | Tom Rapp (28–17–1) | 12–2 | | 4–1 | |
| 1999 | 4A II | 11 | Tom Rapp (28–17–1) | 6–4 | | | |
| 2000 | 4A II | 6 | Todd Dodge (98–11) | 9–5 | | 3–1 | |
| 2001 | 4A II | 6 | Todd Dodge (98–11) | 10–5 | | 4–1 | |
| 2002 | 5A II | 7 | Todd Dodge (98–11) | 16–0 | | 6–0 | |
| 2003 | 5A II | 7 | Todd Dodge (98–11) | 15–1 | | 5–1 | |
| 2004 | 5A II | 5 | Todd Dodge (98–11) | 16–0 | 7–0 | 6–0 | |
| 2005 | 5A II | 5 | Todd Dodge (98–11) | 16–0 | 7–0 | 6–0 | |
| 2006 | 5A II | 5 | Todd Dodge (98–11) | 16–0 | 7–0 | 6–0 | |
| 2007 | 5A II | 5 | Hal Wasson (121–25) | 11–2 | 5–0 | 2–1 | |
| 2008 | 5A II | 6 | Hal Wasson (121–25) | 8–3 | 3–2 | | |
| 2009 | 5A II | 6 | Hal Wasson (121–25) | 11–2 | 5–0 | 2–1 | |
| 2010 | 5A II/I | 7 | Hal Wasson (121–25) | 10–4 | 5–2 | 3–1 | |
| 2011 | 5A II/I | 7 | Hal Wasson (121–25) | 16–0 | 7–0 | 6–0 | |
| 2012 | 5A I | 4 | Hal Wasson (121–25) | 12–2 | 7–0 | 3–1 | |
| 2013 | 5A I | 4 | Hal Wasson (121–25) | 11–2 | 7–0 | 2–1 | |
| 2014 | 6A II | 7 | Hal Wasson (121–25) | 13–1 | 6–0 | 3–1 | |
| 2015 | 6A II | 7 | Hal Wasson (121–25) | 9–3 | 5–1 | 1–1 | |
| 2016 | 6A II | 5 | Hal Wasson (121–25) | 10–2 | 7–0 | 1–1 | |
| 2017 | 6A II | 5 | Hal Wasson (121–25) | 10–4 | 5–2 | 3–1 | |
| 2018 | 6A I | 5 | Riley Dodge (93–9) | 13–1 | 7–0 | 3–1 | |
| 2019 | 6A I | 5 | Riley Dodge (93–9) | 13–1 | 7–0 | 3–1 | |
| 2020 | 6A I | 4 | Riley Dodge (93–9) | 12–2 | 6–0 | 5–1 | |
| 2021 | 6A I | 4 | Riley Dodge (93–9) | 14–1 | 6–0 | 4–1 | |
| 2022 | 6A II | 4 | Riley Dodge (93–9) | 13–1 | 7–0 | 3–1 | |
| 2023 | 6A II | 4 | Riley Dodge (93–9) | 13–2 | 6–1 | 4–1 | |
| 2024 | 6A II | 4 | Riley Dodge (93–9) | 15–1 | 8–0 | 5–1 | |
| Totals | | | | 612–160–8 | 130–8 (Note: District record since 2004. Research into prior records is ongoing.) | 130–32 | |

Additional table references: MaxPreps, Texas High School Football History

=== Cross Country ===
Girls

- Champions: 2000, 2005, 2006, 2007, 2011, 2012, 2013, 2019,
- Runner-Up: 2015, 2016, 2020, 2022, 2023,

The Lady Dragon cross country team has won 8 5A/6A UIL state titles since 2000. They tied the state record in 2012 with 32 points. They qualified for the state meet 17 years in a row, and have had 26 individual state medalists (top 10 in the state) and two individual state champions, Brooke Upshaw in 2005 and Jessa Vacek in 2000. They also claimed 13 regional and 13 district titles. The Lady Dragons have qualified for the Nike Cross National meet in Portland, Oregon, in 9 out of the 10 years it has been held.

Boys

- Champions: 2006, 2007, 2011, 2012, 2013, 2014, 2019, 2020, 2021, 2022, 2023, 2024, 2025
- Runner-Up: 2015, 2016, 2017, 2018

The boys' cross country team won 11 5A/6A UIL state titles, setting the state record in 2011 with 20 points. They have qualified for the state meet 15 times and during that time have 24 state medalists (top 10) and multiple-time state champions Colby Lowe (2006, 2007) and Caden Leonard (2023, 2024, 2025).

=== Tennis ===
- 1996, 1998, 2016, 2022

Southlake has produced seven individual tennis state champions, Doug Fike (1996), Justin Hunter (1998), Arman Dave (2016), a doubles team consisting of Matt Landers and Alec Reusche (2016), and another consisting of Brennan Becicka and Rosabella Andrade (2022). In 1998, Hunter also won the school's only high school national championship for tennis. Head coach Corey Aldridge was named Texas Division High School Coach of Year by USPTA in 2016, and 2022 6A Coach of the Year by the Texas Tennis Coaches Association.

=== Swimming and Diving ===
Boys UIL State Championships

- 2001, 2002, 2011, 2012, 2013, 2014, 2015, 2016, 2017, 2018, 2019, 2022. (12x's)

The Carroll Dragon boys swim team won the state championship in 2001 and 2002 as a 4A school, while the girls team finished second in both years.

Girls UIL State Championships

- 2012, 2013, 2019, 2020, 2022. (5x's)

The 2012 & 2020 Lady Dragon swim/dive teams were crowned the NISCA Power-Point Dual Meet Overall National Champions. The 2016, 2017 and 2018 Dragon Boys' swim/dive teams were crowned the NISCA Power-Point Dual Meet Public School National Champions.

Southlake Carroll boys' and girls' have "swept" the Texas State Meet four times since 2012, with both teams claiming Team State Championships in the same year: 2012, 2013, 2019 and 2022. Since 2010, with over 250 HS Swim/Dive Teams in the largest Texas UIL Class, Southlake Carroll's Boys and Girls have finished in the Top 3 at The Texas State Swim/Dive Championships, 22 of 26 times, making Southlake Carroll arguably the #1 HS Swim/Dive Program in the entire State of Texas.

=== Soccer ===
Girls

- State competition
  - Champions - 2008 (5A), 2019 (6A), 2022 (6A)

Boys

- State competition
  - Champions - 2001 (5A), 2011 (5A),

=== Hockey ===
- State champions
  - 2001, 2002, 2018, 2019
- National competition
  - 2001 - Rocky Mountain District Finalist
  - 2002 - Rocky Mountain District Semi-finalist
  - 2011 - National runner-up
  - 2017 – National quarterfinalist
  - 2018 – National quarterfinalist

=== Volleyball ===
- 2025 Class 6A/D2 State Champions

=== Water Polo ===
- 2015 TISCA State Girls Championship

== Fine arts ==
Carroll Senior High School/High School offers four concert bands, three jazz bands, the Carroll Dragon Marching Band, Carroll Indoor Percussion, five concert choirs, one show choir, the 2011 State Champion Emerald Belles drill team, Color Guard, and the Carroll Theatre program.

=== Band ===
In 2007, 2010, 2014, 2018, 2020, 2021, 2025, and 2026, Carroll Senior High’s Jazz Orchestra was selected as a finalist in the Essentially Ellington Competition. The Jazz Orchestra was also selected to perform at the 2014 Texas Music Educators Association Convention as the Invited High School Jazz Ensemble.

=== Drill Team ===
Founded in 1963, the team has national recognition, appearing on shows like America's Got Talent, the Kelly Clarkson Show, and the Netflix series Dancing Queen. Other major performances include the Dallas Cowboys, Dallas Mavericks, San Antonio Spurs, Fiesta Texas, and Disney World.

== Debate ==
The Southlake debate team has won state championships in several categories.

== Carroll Medical Academy ==
The Carroll Medical Academy (CMA) is Carroll ISD's accelerated math and science program for students interested in pursuing a career in the medical field. CMA began in 2004 and has been under the direction of Sherry Martin since 2005. The program centers around giving students the opportunity to take advanced science courses and participate in medical internships in the Dallas-Fort Worth area. Students involved in Carroll Medical Academy also participate in community service.

== Notable alumni ==
- Tyler Alexander (2013), baseball player who played for the Tampa Bay Rays and Detroit Tigers
- Brady Boyd (2021), football player for the Jacksonville Jaguars
- Brock Boyd (2026), college football player
- Drew Brown (2013), football player who played in the CFL
- Evan Brown (2014), football player for the Houston Texans
- Kris Brown (1994), football player who played in the NFL
- Kyle Brown (2001), soccer player who played in MLS
- Matt Canterino (2016), professional baseball player in the Minnesota Twins organization
- Scott Chandler (2003), football player who played in the NFL
- Carey Clayton (1995), football player who played in the NFL
- John Curtiss (2011), baseball player who played in MLB
- Chase Daniel (2005), football player who played in the NFL, Super Bowl XLIV champion
- Riley Dodge (2007), high school football coach
- Justin Drescher (2006), football player who played in the NFL
- Quinn Ewers (2021), quarterback for the Miami Dolphins, former quarterback for the Texas Longhorns
- Cade Foster (2010), football player who played for the Alabama Crimson Tide, 2x National Champion
- Kennedy Fuller (2024), soccer player who plays for Angel City FC
- Sharon Gilchrist (1990), musician
- Garrett Hartley (2004), football player who played in the NFL, Super Bowl XLIV champion
- Hailey Hernandez (2021), professional diver, competed in the women's 3 meter springboard at the 2020 Summer Olympics
- Kenny Hill (2013), football player who played for the TCU Horned Frogs, current coach for the Incarnate Word Cardinals
- Frankie Jonas (2018), singer and actor, brother of the Jonas Brothers
- Lindsay Jones (2007), voice actor, Rooster Teeth
- Lil'Jordan Humphrey (2016), football player for the Denver Broncos
- Michael Mariot (2006), baseball player who played in the MLB
- RJ Maryland (2022), football player for the SMU Mustangs
- Zoe Matthews (2024), soccer player for the Houston Dash
- Greg McElroy (2007), football player who played in the NFL, commentator for ESPN
- Domenic Mediate (2001), soccer player who played in the MLS
- R.J. Mickens (2020), NFL football safety for the Los Angeles Chargers
- Lexi Missimo (2020), soccer player for the Texas Longhorns, represents United States internationally
- Tre' Newton (2008), former running back for Texas Longhorns
- Asjia O'Neal (2018), professional volleyball player, represents United States internationally
- Kyle Padron (2009), quarterback who played for the Eastern Washington Eagles
- Hudson Potts (2016), baseball player, first round pick of the 2016 MLB draft
- Kacy Rodgers II (2010), football player who played in the CFL
- Sam Schwartzstein (2007), football player who played for the Stanford Cardinal, analytics expert for Thursday Night Football
- Ross Stripling (2008), MLB pitcher for Oakland Athletics
- Adam Ulatoski (2003), football player who played in the NFL
- Maximus Williamson (2024), swimmer

== Notable teachers and staff ==
- Max Boydston (1950), former All-American for Oklahoma Sooners and retired NFL player
