= William Daniell (disambiguation) =

William Daniell (1769–1837), was an English landscape and marine painter, and engraver

William Daniell may also refer to:

- William Daniell (died 1604), MP for Marlborough
- William Daniell (1665–1698), member of the Parliament of England for Marlborough
- William Coffee Daniell (1792–1868), American physician
- William Freeman Daniell (1818–1865), British army surgeon and botanist

== See also ==
- William Daniel (disambiguation)
