= Garrett Hartley =

American football player (born 1986)

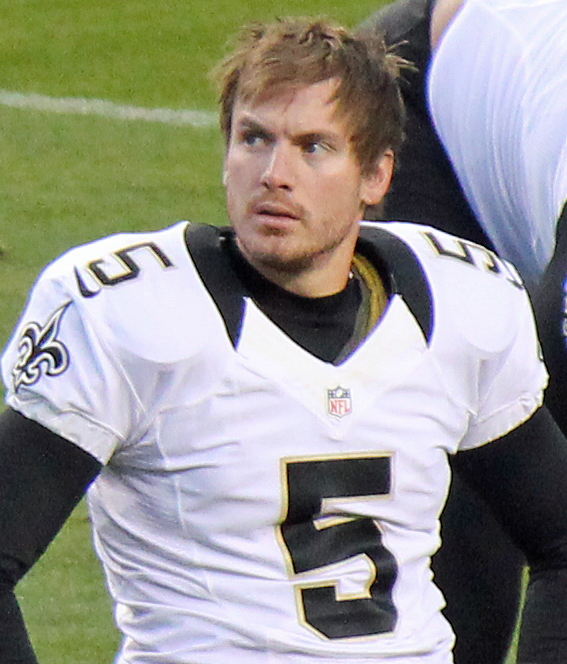
- Hartley with the New Orleans Saints in 2012

No. 5, 10
- Position: Placekicker

Personal information
- Born: May 16, 1986 (age 40); Keller, Texas, U.S.
- Listed height: 5 ft 8 in (1.73 m)
- Listed weight: 195 lb (88 kg)

Career information
- High school: Southlake Carroll (Southlake, Texas)
- College: Oklahoma (2004–2007)
- NFL draft: 2008: undrafted

Career history
- Denver Broncos (2008)*; New Orleans Saints (2008–2013); Cleveland Browns (2014); Pittsburgh Steelers (2015); Seattle Dragons (2020)*; Massachusetts Pirates (2021)
- * Offseason or practice squad member only

Awards and highlights
- Super Bowl champion (XLIV); United Bowl champion (2021); 2× Second-team All-Big 12 (2006, 2007)

Career NFL statistics
- Field goals made: 85
- Field goals attempted: 104
- Field goal %: 81.7%
- Long field goal: 55
- Touchbacks: 14
- Stats at Pro Football Reference

Brandon Garrett Hartley (born May 16, 1986) is an American former professional football player who was a placekicker in the National Football League (NFL). He played college football for the Oklahoma Sooners and was signed by the Denver Broncos as an undrafted free agent in 2008. Later that year he became the placekicker for the New Orleans Saints, for whom he set an NFL record (now surpassed) for most consecutive successful field goals to start a career, and then became the first kicker in NFL history to convert three field goals of more than 40 yards in the Super Bowl. The Saints won Super Bowl XLIV, beating the Indianapolis Colts.

Hartley also played in the NFL for the Cleveland Browns and Pittsburgh Steelers.

== Early life ==
Hartley prepped at Carroll High School in Southlake, Texas, where he was coached by former North Texas coach Todd Dodge. He set a state record with 90 extra points in 2002 (surpassed by Carroll Dragon, Kevin Ortega, in 2004 and then another Carroll Dragon, Cade Foster, in 2009). Coming out of Carroll, Hartley was rated as a three-star prospect and the second-best placekicker in the country by Rivals.com.

== College career ==
Hartley began his college career at Oklahoma University in 2004. He spent most of his first season redshirted, but after inconsistent play from Trey Dicarlo, Sooners head coach Bob Stoops decided to pull Hartley's redshirt and start him. He only played in three games during his abbreviated first season and finished 1-for-1 on field goals and 12-for-12 on extra points with his only field goal coming in the 2005 BCS National Championship Game against USC. Hartley struggled during his sophomore year, missing eight of his 22 field goal attempts despite making two field goals from beyond 50 yards. He went 37 of 38 in extra points attempts.

Hartley broke out during his junior season going 19-for-20 in field goals and 49-for-50 in extra points. Hartley's .950 field goal percentage was among the highest during the season and earned him a nomination for the Lou Groza Award which goes to the nation's best placekicker. Hartley's only miss of the season came during a controversial loss to Oregon when a 44-yard kick was blocked after Hartley had already successfully made four field goals. Hartley's senior season did not quite match the level of performance of the year before. He finished going 13-for-15 in field goals and 71-for-77 in extra points.

== Professional career ==
=== Denver Broncos ===
Hartley was not drafted during the 2008 NFL draft but he signed as a free agent with the Denver Broncos. However, he was released on July 21 just before the start of training camp.

=== New Orleans Saints ===
==== 2008 season ====
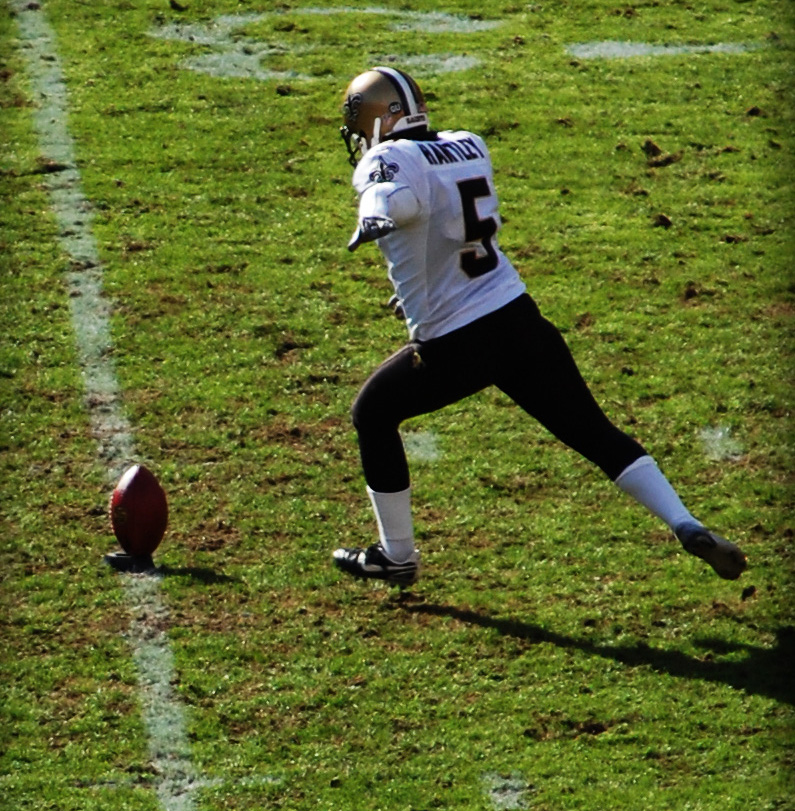
Hartley on November 16, 2008, in a game against the Kansas City Chiefs

Hartley was signed by the New Orleans Saints on October 29, 2008, to replace Taylor Mehlhaff, who was released. He played in his first game on November 9, 2008, against the Atlanta Falcons. Hartley came out strong, booting 13 for 13 field goal attempts for the 2008 season.

==== 2009 season ====
Hartley was expected to be the Saints starting kicker for the 2009 season. However, he was given a 4-game suspension after testing positive for a banned stimulant, Adderall. Hartley remained inactive (while longtime Saints kicker John Carney handled the kicking duties) until the Saints' twelfth game of the season, against the Washington Redskins. Hartley then kicked four field goals, including the game winning kick in overtime that allowed the Saints to preserve their undefeated record. He missed the first field goal of his professional career in this game, from 58 yards. He held the NFL record for most consecutive field goals made to start a career, with 16 until the record was broken in 2012 by Kai Forbath. On January 24, 2010, he made a 40-yard field goal in overtime against the Minnesota Vikings in the NFC Championship to send the New Orleans Saints to their first Super Bowl. He continued in Super Bowl XLIV, going 3-for-3 with field goals of 46, 44, and 47 yards in the 31–17 victory over the Indianapolis Colts. He became the first kicker in Super Bowl history to convert three field goals of 40 yards or more.

==== 2010 season ====
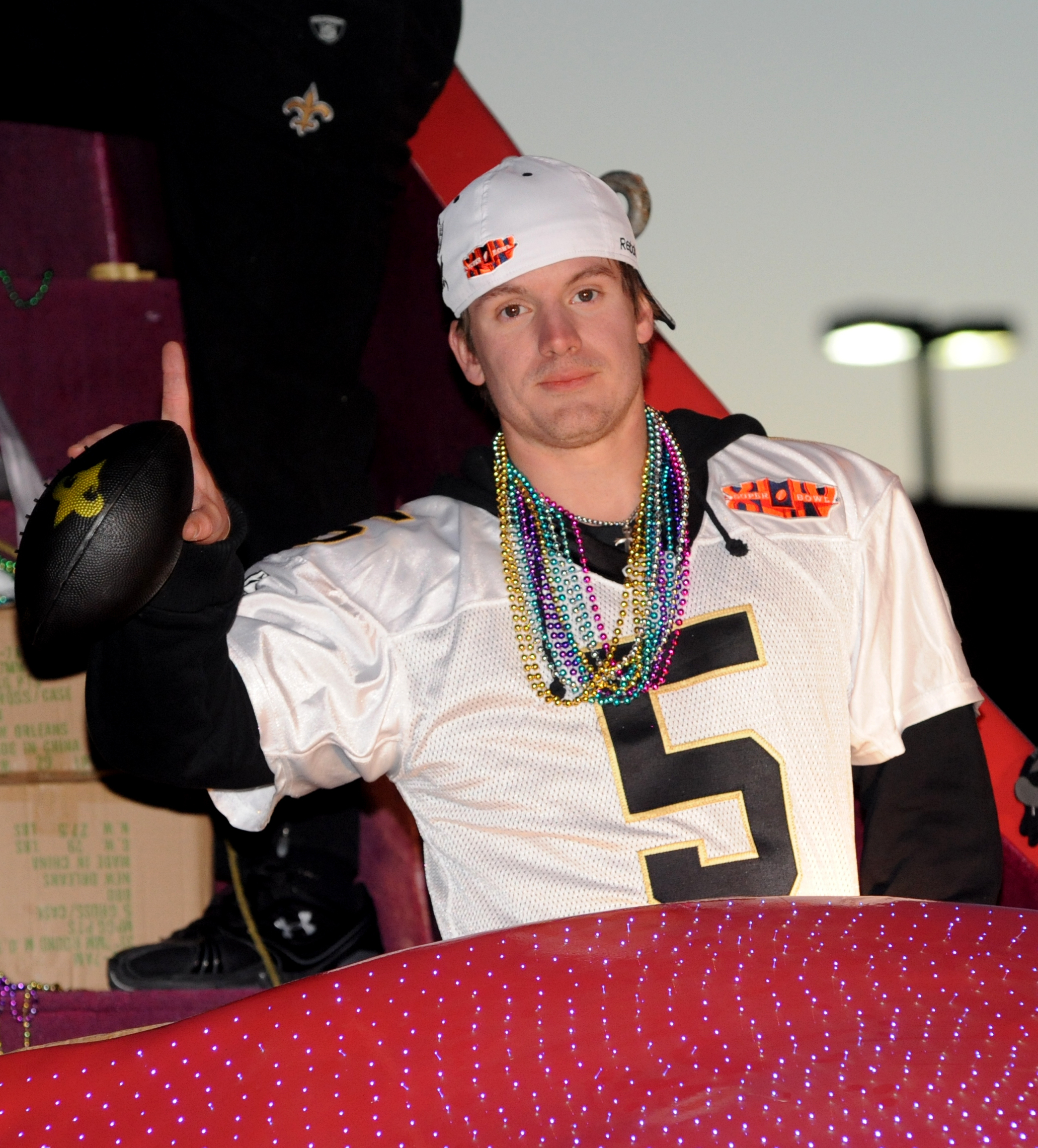
Hartley at the Saints Super Bowl victory parade in 2010

The 2010 season began erratically for Hartley. He missed two field goal attempts in the Saints' Week 1 home win over the Minnesota Vikings. He later made three field goals despite windy conditions in a Week 2 win on the road against the San Francisco 49ers. In a Week 3 match with the Atlanta Falcons, he made a last-second field goal to send the game into overtime, but then missed a 29-yard field goal attempt in overtime that would have won the game. In response, the Saints re-signed John Carney, and Hartley was inactive for the next two games. With injuries mounting at other positions, however, the Saints decided not to continue carrying two kickers, cutting Carney and returning Hartley to his starting position. In the 2010 season, Hartley converted all 40 extra point attempts and 20 of 25 field goal attempts in 14 games.

==== 2011 season ====
Hartley missed the entire 2011 season after injuring his hip during a preseason game. He was replaced by veteran John Kasay.

==== 2012 season ====
Hartley returned as the Saints' kicker in 2012. In the 2012 season, he converted all 57 extra point attempts and 18 of 22 of field goal attempts. While with the Saints, he was teammates with long snapper Justin Drescher and holder Chase Daniel, all of whom went to Carroll Senior High School. On December 23, 2012, the trio connected on a game-winning field goal in overtime against the Dallas Cowboys.

==== 2013 season ====
After Hartley missed two field goals against the St. Louis Rams on Sunday, December 15, 2013, one of which was attempted from only 26 yards, he was released by the Saints on December 17, 2013, and replaced by veteran kicker Shayne Graham the same day. In the 2013 season, Hartley converted all 41 extra point attempts and 22 of 30 field goal attempts.

=== Cleveland Browns ===
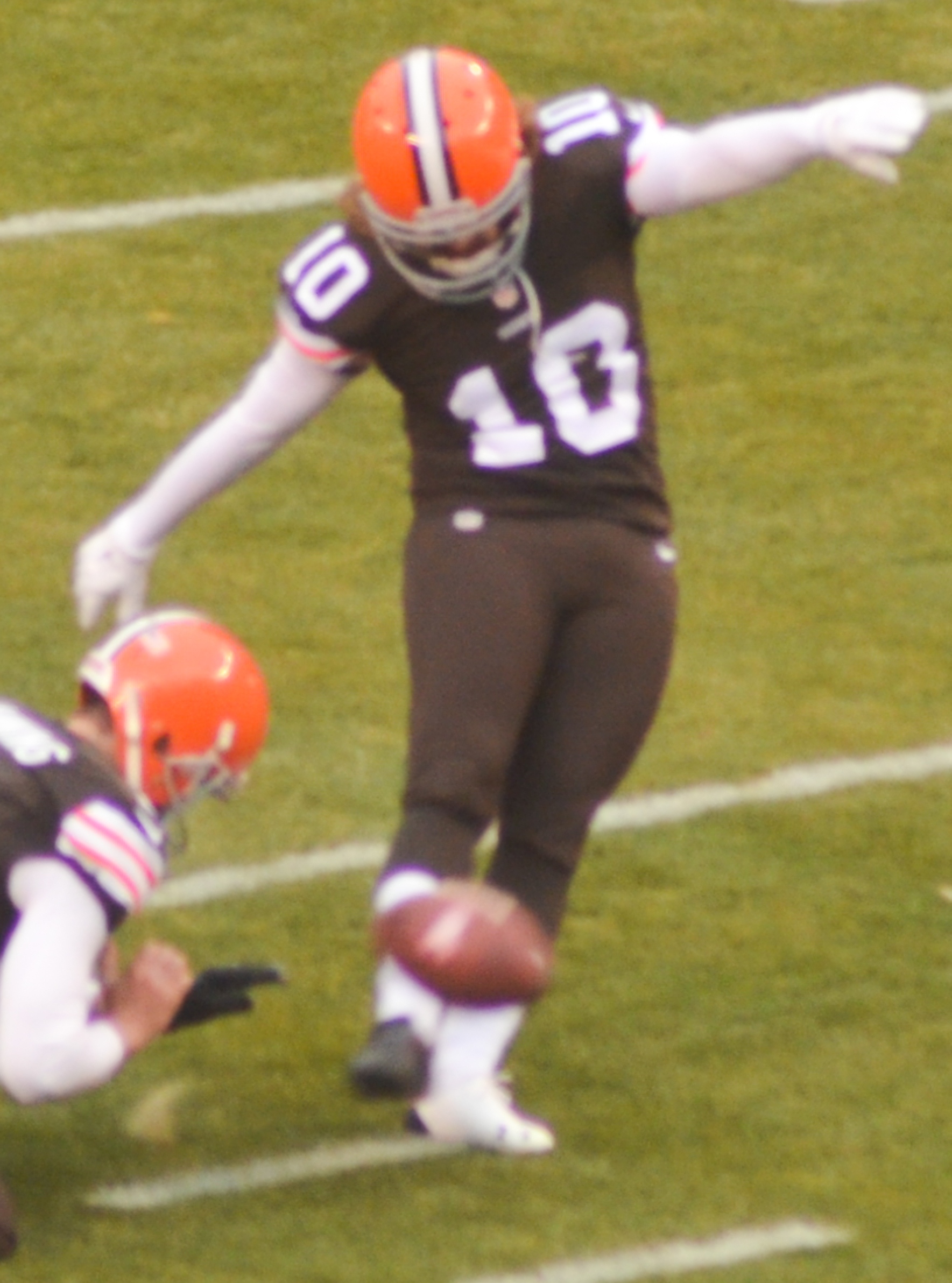
Hartley with the Cleveland Browns in 2014

On December 13, 2014, Hartley was signed by the Cleveland Browns to replace Billy Cundiff, who had injured his knee. He was active as the Browns' placekicker for their next game, against Cincinnati, but he did not actually have an opportunity to play in the game, because the opening kickoff was handled by Browns punter Spencer Lanning and the Browns never had another kicking opportunity as they failed to score (or even to attempt a field goal) in a 30–0 loss.

Hartley was waived by the Browns on March 11, 2015.

=== Pittsburgh Steelers ===
On August 11, 2015, Hartley was signed by the Pittsburgh Steelers to replace Shaun Suisham, who had torn his ACL. On August 29, Hartley suffered a pulled hamstring during a preseason game against the Buffalo Bills. On August 31, Hartley was placed on injured reserve. On October 13, he was released by the Steelers.

=== Seattle Dragons ===
Hartley signed with the Seattle Dragons of the XFL on January 24, 2020. He was waived on January 28 after failing to receive medical clearance, as he has an artificial disk in his neck and not a fusion.

=== Massachusetts Pirates ===
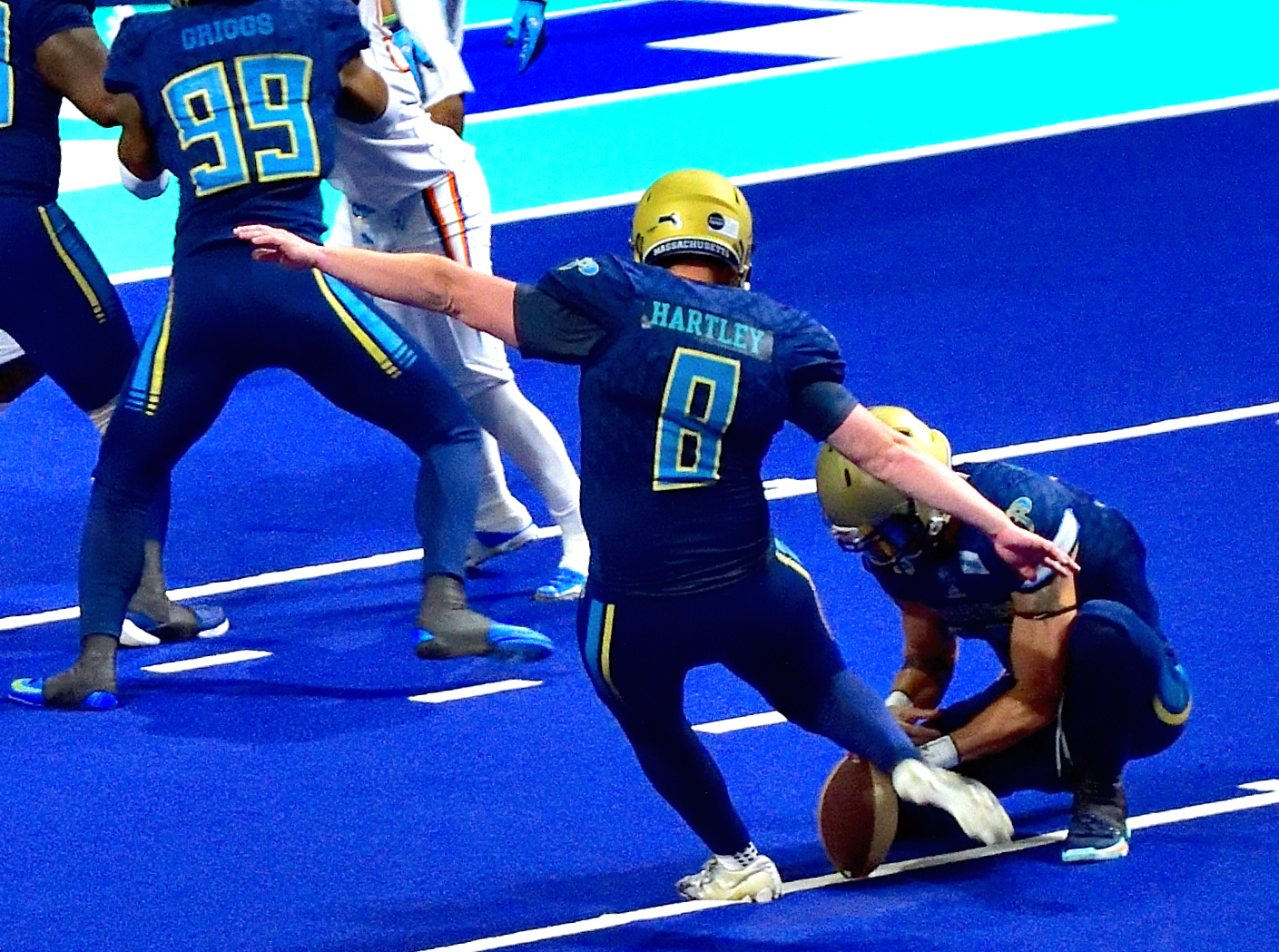
Hartley kicking for the Pirates in the 2021 IFL semifinal against the Frisco Fighters.

On September 3, 2021, it was announced that Hartley signed with the Massachusetts Pirates of the Indoor Football League two days before their playoff semifinal game against the Frisco Fighters.

In the United Bowl on September 12, Hartley kicked the game-winning field goal in overtime, securing the Pirates' 37–34 win over the Arizona Rattlers and winning them their first league title in franchise history.

On January 17, 2022, Hartley was released by the Pirates.
