= Alexander R. Hobbs =

American politician (1852–1929)

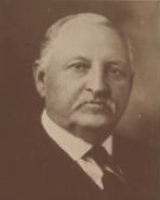

Member of the Virginia Senate from the 27th district
- In office December 4, 1901 – January 12, 1916
- Preceded by: Richard B. Hartley
- Succeeded by: Sidney B. Barham Jr.

Member of the Virginia House of Delegates for Surry and Prince George
- In office January 9, 1918 – January 14, 1920
- Preceded by: David A. Harrison Jr.
- Succeeded by: Horace L. Smith
- In office December 1, 1897 – December 6, 1899
- Preceded by: Sidney B. Barham
- Succeeded by: William W. Baugh

Personal details
- Born: Alexander Raleigh Hobbs; April 5, 1852 Prince George County, Virginia, U.S.
- Died: October 15, 1929 (aged 77) Hopewell, Virginia, U.S.
- Party: Democratic
- Spouse: Emma Gertrude Rives
- Education: Virginia Tech

Alexander Raleigh Hobbs (April 5, 1852 – October 15, 1929) was an American lawyer and Democratic politician who served as a member of the Virginia Senate and House of Delegates.

Virginia House of Delegates
Preceded by Sidney B. Barham	Virginia Delegate for Surry and Prince George; 1897–1899; 1918–1920	Succeeded by William W. Baugh
Preceded by David A. Harrison Jr.	Virginia Delegate for Surry and Prince George; 1897–1899; 1918–1920	Succeeded by Horace L. Smith
Senate of Virginia
Preceded by Richard B. Hartley	Virginia Senator for the 27th District; 1901–1916	Succeeded by Sidney B. Barham Jr.
