= Bill Daniel =

Bill Daniel may refer to:

- Bill Daniel (filmmaker) (born 1959), American filmmaker
- Bill Daniel (politician) (1915–2006), American politician

== See also ==
- William Daniel (disambiguation)
- Bill Daniels (disambiguation)
