= Sidney B. Barham =

American physician and politician

Member of the Virginia House of Delegates for Surry and Prince George
- In office March 27, 1903 – January 13, 1904
- Preceded by: William B. Clarke
- Succeeded by: William B. Daniel
- In office December 6, 1893 – December 1, 1897
- Preceded by: Robert R. Ramey
- Succeeded by: Alexander R. Hobbs

Personal details
- Born: Sidney Baxter Barham; May 31, 1838 Halifax, Virginia, U.S.
- Died: September 20, 1915 (aged 77) Scottsburg, Virginia, U.S.
- Party: Democratic
- Spouse: Hannah Ann Davis
- Children: 3, including Sidney Jr.
- Education: Medical College of Virginia

Sidney Baxter Barham (May 31, 1838 – September 20, 1915) was an American physician and Democratic politician who represented Surry and Prince George counties in the Virginia House of Delegates.

== Early and family life ==
Born to the former Rebecca Ann Price Bell and her farmer husband Thomas B. Barham (1804-1885) in Surry County in 1838, his family included his sister, grandmother and three hired hands but no slaves in 1850. Sidney Barham received a private education, attending the Medical College of Virginia and the medical department of Hampden-Sydney College graduating in 1861, and became a physician. On February 5, 1863, he married Hannah Ann Davis (1839- ); daughter of John Lane Davis and his wife Sarah, who could trace her descent to Revolutionary war patriot Lt. James Davis Jr. They had son Thomas Barham the following year, followed by daughter Virginia Barham in 1866.

== Career ==
Surry county voters twice elected Barham to the Virginia House of Delegates, serving from 1893 to 1897, and was later in 1903 selected to fill a vacancy. He died in 1915 and the Norfolk Times Herald published an obituary on September 21, 1915, His son, Sidney B. Barham Jr., an active Democrat and Surry's postmaster beginning in 1902, represented the same constituency in the House of Delegates during the 1906 and 1910 General Assembly sessions and was later elected to the Virginia Senate.

Virginia House of Delegates
Preceded by Robert R. Ramey	Virginia Delegate for Surry and Prince George; 1893–1897; 1903–1904	Succeeded by Alexander R. Hobbs
Preceded by William B. Clarke	Virginia Delegate for Surry and Prince George; 1893–1897; 1903–1904	Succeeded by William B. Daniel
