= Southlake Town Square =

Shopping area in Southlake, Texas

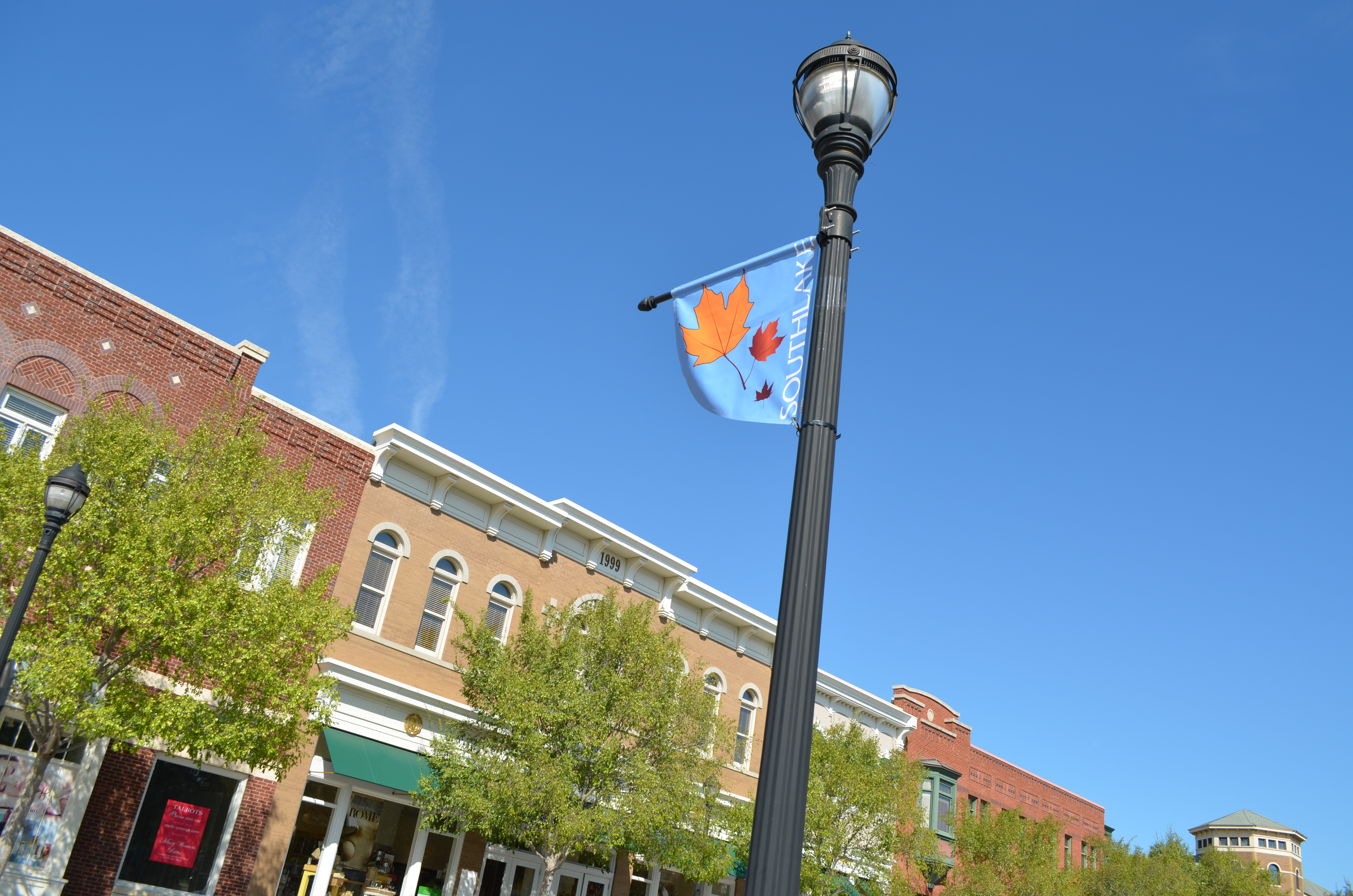
- Southlake Town Square, September 2010
- Location: Southlake, Texas, United States
- Coordinates: 32.94362°N 97.13074°W
- Opened: 1999
- Developer: Cooper & Stebbins
- Manager: RPAI Southwest Management
- Owner: RPAI
- Num. of stores: 95+
- Floor area: 840,288 sq ft (78,065.3 m^{2})
- Website: www.southlaketownsquare.com

Southlake Town Square is a shopping precinct located in the city of Southlake, in the U.S. state of Texas. Owned and managed by Kite Realty Group.

== History ==
The plans to develop open pastures into an upscale downtown for the City of Southlake began in the 1990s. Shortly after plans were approved by the city council, Cooper & Stebbins began developing phase I of the Southlake Town Square master plan. Phase I consisted of 250,000 sq ft (23,000 m^{2}) of the Southlake Town Hall, City of Southlake Public Library, a signature square with extensive landscaping, Rustin Park with a gazebo and pond, four blocks of retail with office overhead, and the only Post Office in the area. In 2006, Cooper & Stebbins opened phase II of Southlake Town Square.

In 2015, Granite Properties got the green light to build a seven-story office building east of North Carroll Boulevard. In 2020, Macy's chose Southlake Town Square to open its first Market by Macy’s. On January 9, 2025, it was announced that Market by Macy's would be closing as part of a plan to close 66 stores nationwide. The store will close in March 2025.

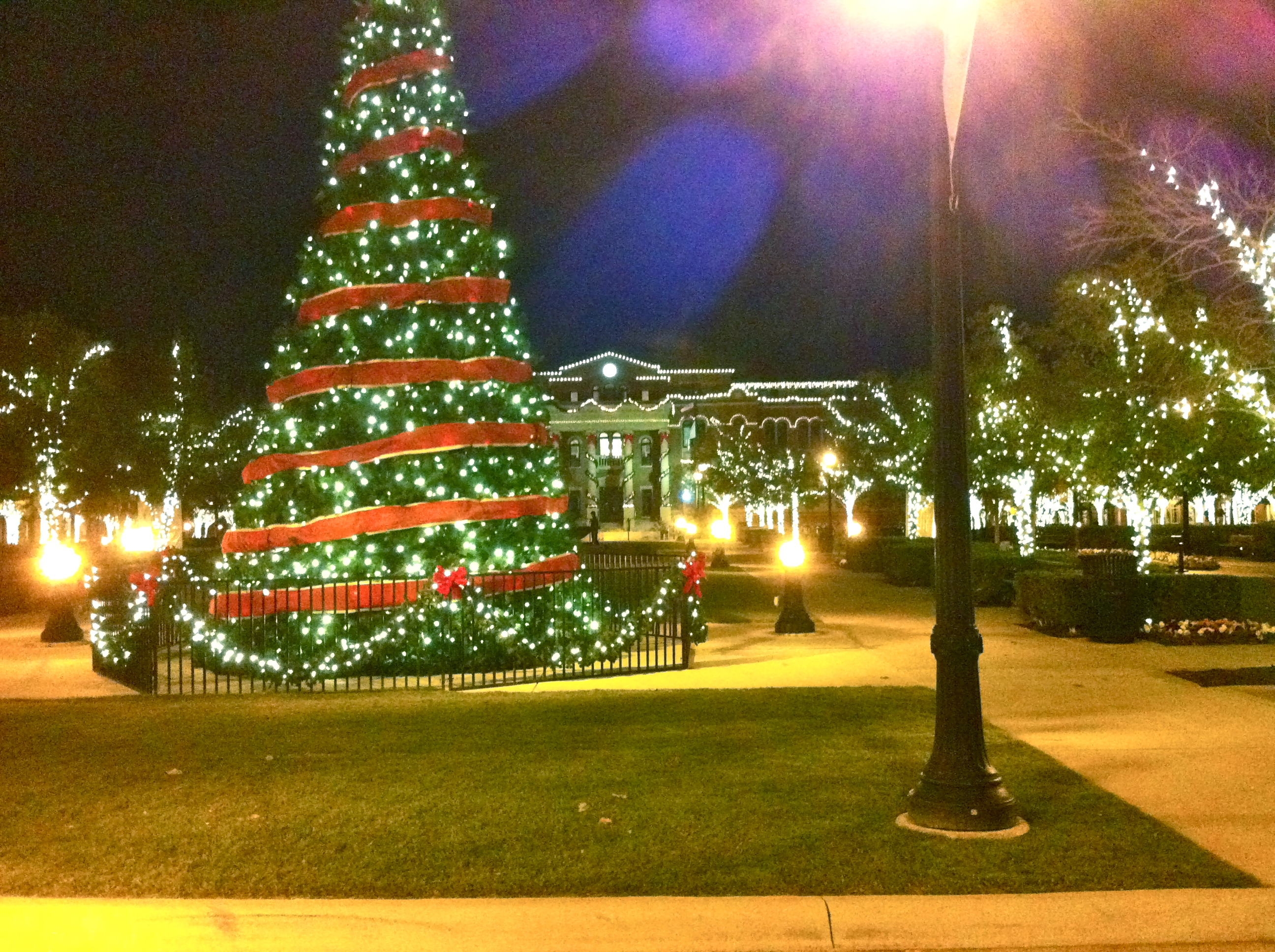
Christmas Tree-Southlake Town Square

== Description ==
Centered on Southlake's Town Hall, Southlake Town Square is incorporating Southlake Town Hall, Southlake Municipal Court, Southlake Public Library, Southlake DPS Headquarters, single-family residential, over 100 stores, 27 eateries, three parks, medical offices, and a Hilton luxury boutique hotel.
