= Chase Daniel =

American football player (born 1986)

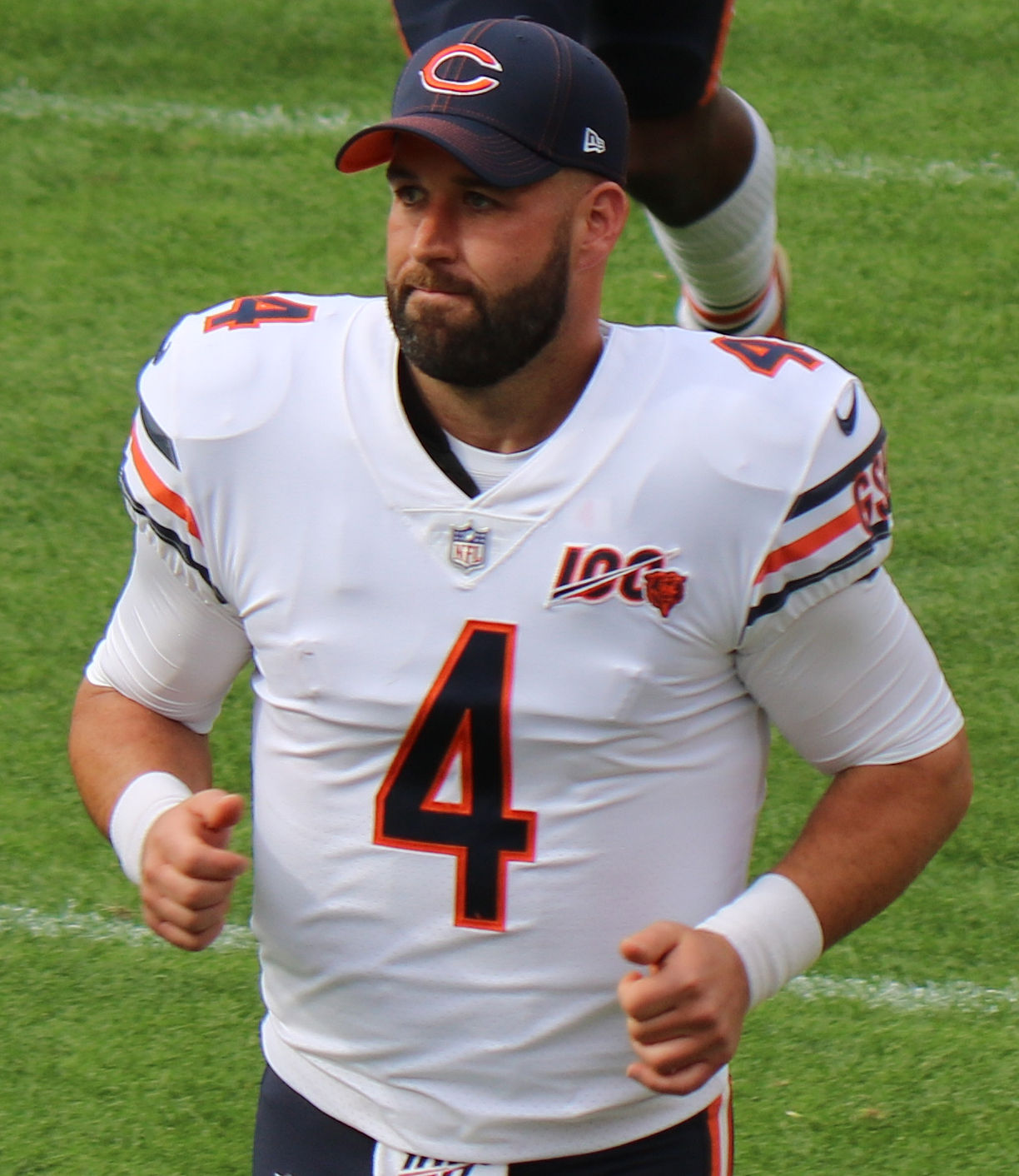
- Daniel with the Chicago Bears in 2019

No. 10, 4, 7
- Position: Quarterback

Personal information
- Born: October 7, 1986 (age 40); Irving, Texas, U.S.
- Listed height: 6 ft 0 in (1.83 m)
- Listed weight: 229 lb (104 kg)

Career information
- High school: Carroll (Southlake, Texas)
- College: Missouri (2005–2008)
- NFL draft: 2009: undrafted

Career history
- Washington Redskins (2009)*; New Orleans Saints (2009–2012); Kansas City Chiefs (2013–2015); Philadelphia Eagles (2016); New Orleans Saints (2017); Chicago Bears (2018–2019); Detroit Lions (2020); Los Angeles Chargers (2021–2022)
- * Offseason or practice squad member only

Awards and highlights
- Super Bowl champion (XLIV); Second-team All-American (2007); Big 12 Offensive Player of the Year (2007); First-team All-Big 12 (2007); Second-team All-Big 12 (2006)

Career NFL statistics
- Passing attempts: 273
- Passing completions: 186
- Completion percentage: 68.1%
- TD–INT: 9–7
- Passing yards: 1,746
- Passer rating: 85.8
- Stats at Pro Football Reference

William Chase Daniel (born October 7, 1986) is an American former professional football player who was a quarterback in the National Football League (NFL) for 14 seasons. He played college football for the Missouri Tigers, earning second-team All-American honors in 2007. He was signed by the Washington Redskins as an undrafted free agent in 2009. During his career, Daniel was also a member of the New Orleans Saints, Kansas City Chiefs, Philadelphia Eagles, Chicago Bears, Detroit Lions, and Los Angeles Chargers. Daniel is a Super Bowl champion, having been the backup quarterback on the Saints team that won Super Bowl XLIV.

== Early life ==
Daniel prepped under head coach Todd Dodge at Carroll High School in Southlake, Texas, which won the 5A Division II state title in 2004, 2005, and 2006. After playing his sophomore year at wide receiver, Daniel was a two-year starter at quarterback, leading his team to a 31–1 record. He completed 65.2% of his passes for 8,298 yards and 91 touchdowns and added 2,954 rushing yards and 39 scores. Southlake earned a No. 1 national ranking in 2004 after winning the 5A state championship, while Daniel won the 5A state Player of the Year. He was also named the EA Sports National Player of the Year.

As a junior, Daniel threw for 3,681 yards with 42 touchdowns and nine interceptions. In addition, he ran for 1,529 yards with 18 touchdowns.

Daniel was not heavily recruited by the University of Texas, his preferred school, despite a strong high school career. He ultimately committed to the University of Missouri, declining later interest from Texas head coach Mack Brown. Daniel also received scholarship offers from Maryland, Oklahoma State, Stanford, and Texas A&M.

During high school, Daniel was a member of National Honor Society, and a member of his school's student council for three years.

== College career ==
Daniel played at the University of Missouri, passing for more than 12,000 yards and throwing for more than 100 touchdowns. He is widely considered one of the most successful quarterbacks in the school's history.

Although he was not Missouri's most heralded NFL prospect, Daniel raised the football program's profile significantly as a three-year starter and arguably laid the groundwork for the Tigers' eventual move to the Southeastern Conference in 2012 by guiding the Tigers to within one win of a BCS National Championship berth in 2007.

=== 2005 season ===
Daniel was the primary backup quarterback for Brad Smith in the 2005 season and played in 10 games. He completed 38-of-66 passes for 247 yards, one touchdown, and two interceptions. On October 15, he was 16-of-23 for 185 passing yards and a touchdown against Iowa State.

=== 2006 season ===
Daniel started all 13 games in 2006 as Missouri earned a berth in the Brut Sun Bowl. He threw for 3,527 yards with a 63.5 percent completion rate and 28 touchdowns. Daniel also set a school record for passing touchdowns in a game, racking up five scores in the season opener against Murray State. This was good enough for a second-team All-Big 12 selection while he also was named to the first-team All-Academic Big 12 Team. Daniel was also one of the 35 quarterbacks placed on the 2007 Manning Award watch list.

=== 2007 season ===
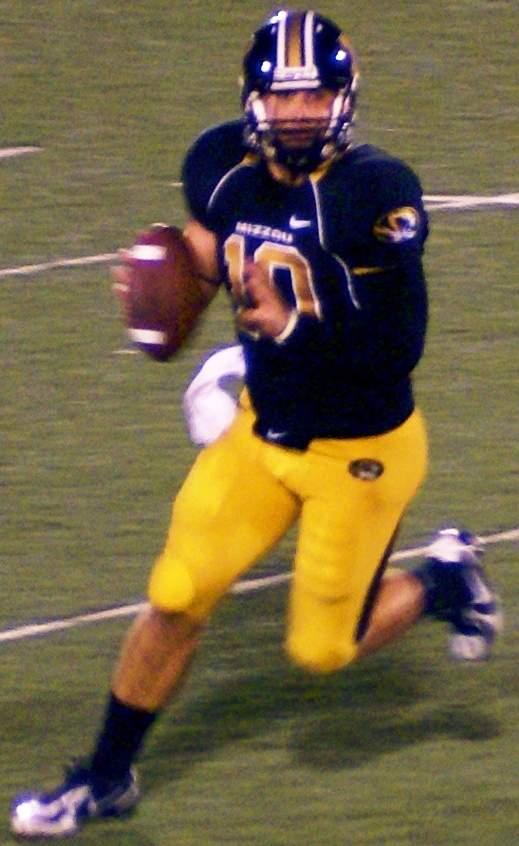
Daniel in 2007

Daniel improved in 2007, throwing for 4,306 yards with a 68.2 percent completion rate and 33 touchdowns, with only 11 interceptions in 14 games. He also rushed for a net 253 yards and four touchdowns for a total offense of 37 touchdowns and 4,559 yards, which was good for an average of almost 326 yards per game. He led the Tigers to the cusp of a national championship appearance; in late November 2007, the program surged to #1 in the Associated Press poll for the first time since 1960.

After the Tigers defeated arch rival Kansas, the edition of December 3, 2007, of Sports Illustrated featured Daniel on the cover, with the caption "Mizzou, That's Who." Despite losing to the Oklahoma Sooners in the Big 12 Championship Game, the Tigers dominated Arkansas in the Cotton Bowl on New Year's Day.

On November 27, 2007, the Big 12 Conference named Daniel the Offensive Player of the Year. He is the first Missouri player to receive that honor.

On December 5, 2007, Daniel was invited by the Heisman Trophy Trust to go to New York City as one of four finalists. He finished fourth in the Heisman Trophy voting with 425 points. He garnered 25 first-place votes, 84 second-place votes, and 182 third-place votes. He became the third Tiger to finish in the top ten. His fourth-place showing marks the second-highest finish in Heisman voting by a Missouri Tigers player, with Paul Christman the only one to finish higher (third in 1939).

On January 1, 2008, Missouri wrapped up a school-best 12–2 season with a 38–7 win over Arkansas in the Cotton Bowl. A week later, the Tigers were ranked #4 in the Associated Press' final poll – the highest final ranking in school history – and #5 in the ESPN/USA Today coaches' poll. Daniel also announced he was returning for his senior season after putting his name in with the NFL College Advisory Committee to receive feedback for the NFL Draft.

=== 2008 season ===
In the 2008 preseason, Daniel was named one of 26 candidates for the 2008 Unitas Award, given to the nation's best senior college football quarterback. He continued to break virtually all Mizzou passing records, and in a two-game span against Southeast Missouri State and Nevada, he threw for more touchdowns (seven) than he did incomplete passes (six).

Daniel appeared on the cover of ESPN the Magazine with teammate Chase Patton.

Daniel donned #25 in honor of fallen teammate Aaron O'Neal. O'Neal died before beginning his freshman year during practice in July 2005, and would have been a senior in 2008. The number rotated among the senior class that season.

Daniel became the Missouri career total offense yardage leader on December 6, with 13,256. He moved ahead of Brad Smith. Missouri finished with 10 wins and a #19 ranking in AP Polls.

Missouri ended 2008 with a 10-win record, culminating with a victory over Northwestern in the Valero Alamo Bowl.

== Professional career ==
Pre-draft measurables
Height	Weight	40-yard dash	10-yard split	20-yard split	20-yard shuttle	Three-cone drill	Vertical jump	Broad jump
6 ft 0 in (1.83 m)	218 lb (99 kg)	4.92 s	1.76 s	2.87 s	4.31 s	7.28 s	33 in (0.84 m)	9 ft 0 in (2.74 m)
Broad from Missouri Pro Day, all others from NFL Combine

Some scouts considered Daniel among the best quarterbacks in the 2009 Draft, but they had concerns about his height and whether his skills in the college spread offense would translate to the very different game played in the NFL. Daniel's height was measured as 6 ft 0 in at the NFL Scouting Combine. He weighed in at 218 pounds. Daniel ran a 4.86 and 4.79 in the 40 and had a nine-foot broad jump in his Pro Day.

=== Washington Redskins ===
Daniel was not selected in the 2009 NFL draft, but was signed as an undrafted free agent by the Washington Redskins. The Redskins waived him when making their final roster cuts on September 5, 2009.

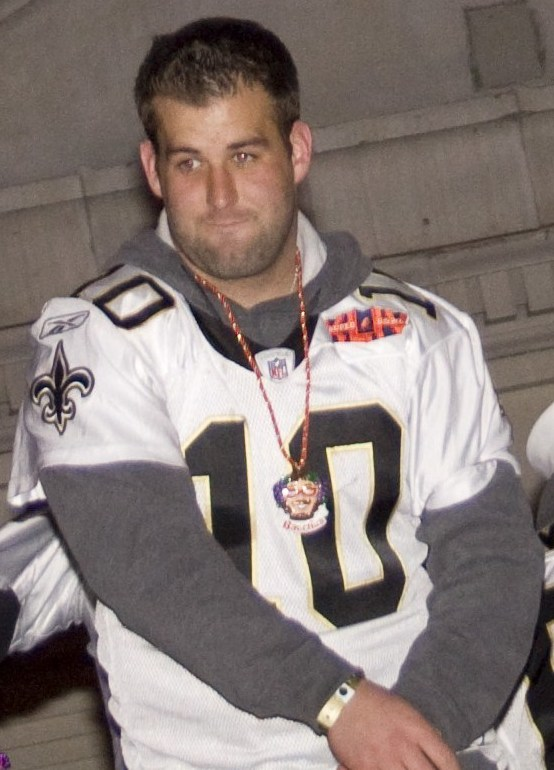
Daniel at the Super Bowl XLIV victory parade in February 2010

=== New Orleans Saints (first stint) ===
Daniel was signed to the New Orleans Saints practice squad on September 6, 2009. He was promoted to the active roster on September 26, and named the emergency third quarterback for the September 27 game against the Buffalo Bills. The Saints waived Daniel on October 12, 2009, after placekicker Garrett Hartley (coincidentally, a teammate of Daniel's at Southlake Carroll High School) came back from a four-game suspension, then re-signed him on October 16. On November 17, 2009, ESPN reported that Daniel had been cut once again, to allow the Saints to sign cornerback Chris McAlister. He was signed to the team's practice squad again on November 20, 2009. He was released from the practice squad on December 9, 2009, only to be re-signed to the practice squad two days later. Daniel was promoted to the active roster before the regular season finale on January 1, 2010. He was a member of the New Orleans Saints Super Bowl XLIV Championship team, although he did not take the field that season.

Going into the 2010 season, Daniel was expected to battle with veteran Patrick Ramsey for the backup quarterback position behind Drew Brees. Daniel and Ramsey put up similar numbers during the preseason, but on September 3, it was reported that Daniel had been chosen as backup quarterback; the team waived Ramsey. He signed a new one-year contract with the Saints in March 2012. He continued as the primary backup to Brees, as well as the team's placekick holder, for the 2010, 2011, and 2012 seasons. While with the Saints, he was teammates with placekicker Garrett Hartley and long snapper Justin Drescher, all of whom went to Southlake Carroll High School. On December 23, 2012, the trio connected on a game-winning field goal in overtime against the Dallas Cowboys.

=== Kansas City Chiefs ===
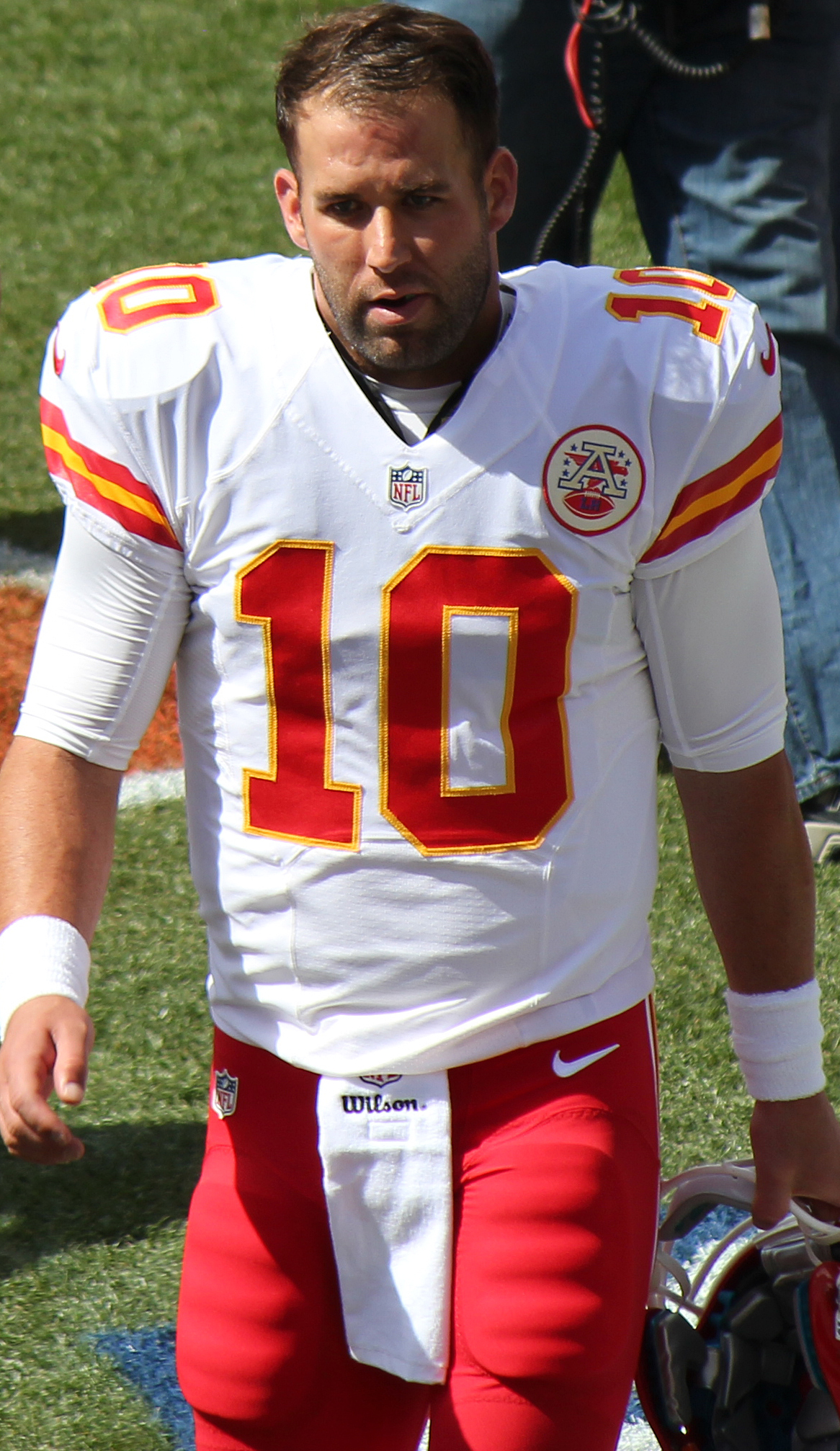
Daniel in 2014

Daniel signed with the Kansas City Chiefs on March 12, 2013. For 2013, he was secured as the backup to Alex Smith. In Week 14 of the 2013 NFL season, Daniel played against the Redskins and was 1 for 3 in passing with an interception. The Chiefs won, 45–10. In Week 17, with the Chiefs locked into the #5 seed in the playoffs, Daniel started his first regular-season NFL game, a 24–27 overtime loss to the San Diego Chargers, going 21/30 for 200 yards and one touchdown pass, while rushing for an additional 59 yards. His final 2013 stats were 248 yards, one touchdown, and one interception.

Daniel returned to the Chiefs for the 2014 season as Smith's backup. Before week 17 against the Chargers, it was announced that Smith had suffered a lacerated spleen and would miss the game and possibly the playoffs, giving Daniel the start on Week 17 for the second straight year. This time, Daniel led the Chiefs to a 19–7 victory over the Chargers. The victory eliminated the Chargers from playoff contention.

Daniel remained with the Chiefs in the 2015 season but appeared in relief in only two games in the regular season and the 30–0 victory over the Houston Texans in the Wild Card Round of the playoffs.

=== Philadelphia Eagles ===
On March 9, 2016, Daniel signed a three-year, $21 million contract with the Philadelphia Eagles. In the 2016 season, he was the backup to rookie Carson Wentz, whom the Eagles chose with the second overall pick. He appeared in two games in the 2016 season. On March 13, 2017, hours after the Eagles signed free agent quarterback and former Philadelphia Eagle Nick Foles, Daniel requested and was granted his release from the team.

=== New Orleans Saints (second stint) ===
On March 29, 2017, Daniel signed a one-year contract to return to the Saints. In the 2017 season, he appeared in one game, against the Buffalo Bills, in relief of Brees.

=== Chicago Bears ===
On March 14, 2018, Daniel signed a two-year, $10 million contract with the Chicago Bears with $7 million guaranteed.

For the 2018 regular season, he served as the backup to Mitchell Trubisky. In week four, he saw action against the Tampa Bay Buccaneers on a trick play nicknamed "Willy Wonka", which had been designed by coach Matt Nagy and the quarterbacks and named by Daniel days before the game. On the Buccaneers' three-yard line, Daniel joined Trubisky in the backfield in the shotgun formation. Before the play began, receiver Taylor Gabriel and tight end Trey Burton moved along the line of scrimmage to confuse the defense. Upon receiving the snap, Trubisky quickly pitched the ball forward to Gabriel on a shovel pass. Trubisky then faked a hand-off to Daniel as Gabriel scored the touchdown.

On November 21, Daniel was named the starter for the Week 12 Thanksgiving matchup against the Detroit Lions due to a shoulder injury to Trubisky. It was his third career start and his first since Week 17 of the 2014 season with the Chiefs. He completed 27 of 37 pass attempts for 230 yards with two touchdowns and no interceptions in a 23–16 Bears victory.

Daniel remained the starter in the next week's game against the New York Giants. He completed 26 of 39 passes for 285 yards with a touchdown and two interceptions (both by Giants linebacker Alec Ogletree, one of which was returned for a touchdown), and was sacked five times as the Bears lost in overtime, 30–27. Trubisky returned to the starting role a week later.

In Week 4 of the 2019 season against the Minnesota Vikings, Daniel replaced an injured Trubisky in the first quarter. He completed 22 of 30 passes for 195 yards and a touchdown to Tarik Cohen as the Bears won 16–6. With Trubisky unable to play the following week's game against the Oakland Raiders in London, Daniel started as quarterback. Although he threw for 231 yards and two touchdowns, he was also intercepted twice, once late in the game, as the Bears lost, 24–21. In Week 11 against the Los Angeles Rams on Sunday Night Football, Daniel was put into the game late in the fourth quarter after Trubisky was injured. He threw for nine yards as the Bears lost, 17–7.

=== Detroit Lions ===
On March 24, 2020, Daniel signed a three-year, $13.05 million contract with the Detroit Lions.

Daniel made his first appearance for the Lions during Week 9 against the Minnesota Vikings after starter Matthew Stafford left the game in the fourth quarter. He completed 8 of 13 passes for 94 yards, a touchdown, and an interception as the Lions lost, 34–20.

On March 18, 2021, Daniel was released by the Lions.

=== Los Angeles Chargers ===
On March 31, 2021, Daniel signed with the Los Angeles Chargers. He served as the backup to Justin Herbert, appearing in one game.

On March 17, 2022, Daniel re-signed with the Chargers. In Week 18 against the Denver Broncos, Daniel relieved Herbert and threw for 25 yards, completing a touchdown pass to Keenan Allen, as well as a two–point conversion to Joshua Palmer in what would be his final NFL game.

=== Retirement ===
On September 5, 2023, Daniel announced his retirement from professional football after fourteen seasons, while also announcing his intent to begin a new full-time media career for multiple outlets, including the NFL Network.

== Career statistics ==
=== NFL ===
Legend
	Won the Super Bowl
**Bold**	Career high

Year	Team	Games			Passing								Rushing			
Year	Team	GP	GS	Record	Cmp	Att	Pct	Yds	Y/A	TD	Int	Rtg	Att	Yds	Avg	TD
2009	NO	0	0	–	DNP											
2010	NO	13	0	–	2	3	66.7	16	5.3	0	0	79.9	2	16	**8.0**	0
2011	NO	**16**	0	–	4	5	80.0	29	5.8	0	0	90.8	3	−3	−1.0	0
2012	NO	**16**	0	–	1	1	**100.0**	10	10.0	0	0	108.3	3	17	5.7	0
2013	KC	5	1	0–1	25	38	65.8	248	6.5	1	1	81.9	**14**	**52**	3.7	0
2014	KC	3	1	**1–0**	16	28	57.1	157	5.6	0	0	73.1	4	15	3.8	0
2015	KC	2	0	–	2	2	**100.0**	4	2.0	0	0	79.2	2	−2	−1.0	0
2016	PHI	1	0	–	1	1	**100.0**	16	**16.0**	0	0	**118.8**	0	0	0.0	0
2017	NO	1	0	–	0	0	0.0	0	0.0	0	0	0.0	3	−2	−0.7	0
2018	CHI	5	**2**	1–1	**53**	**76**	69.7	**515**	6.8	**3**	**2**	90.6	13	3	0.2	0
2019	CHI	3	1	0–1	45	64	70.3	435	6.8	**3**	**2**	91.6	6	6	1.0	0
2020	DET	4	0	–	29	43	67.4	264	6.1	1	**2**	72.2	2	16	**8.0**	0
2021	LAC	1	0	–	0	0	0.0	0	0.0	0	0	0.0	2	−2	−1.0	0
2022	LAC	4	0	–	8	12	66.7	52	4.3	1	0	103.5	1	4	4.0	0
Career		74	5	2–3	186	273	68.1	1,746	6.4	9	7	85.8	55	120	2.2	0

=== College ===
Season	Team	Games			Passing								Rushing			
Season	Team	GP	GS	Record	Cmp	Att	Pct	Yds	Avg	TD	Int	Rate	Att	Yds	Avg	TD
2005	Missouri	10	0	—	38	66	57.6	347	5.3	1	2	100.7	39	57	1.5	1
2006	Missouri	13	13	8–5	287	452	63.5	3,527	7.8	28	10	145.1	**147**	**379**	2.6	**4**
2007	Missouri	**14**	**14**	**12–2**	384	**563**	68.2	4,306	7.6	33	11	147.9	109	253	2.3	**4**
2008	Missouri	**14**	**14**	10–4	**385**	528	**72.9**	**4,335**	**8.2**	**39**	**18**	**159.4**	69	281	**4.1**	1
Career		51	41	30–11	1,094	1,609	68.0	12,515	7.8	101	41	148.9	364	970	2.7	10

== Awards and honors ==
NFL

- Super Bowl champion (XLIV)

College

- Heisman Trophy candidate (2007)
- 2006 First-team Academic All-Big 12
- 2006 ESPN The Magazine First-team Academic All-District
- 2006 Big 12 Offensive Player of the Week (Sep 4 and Nov. 27)
- 2006 AP Honorable Mention All-Big 12
- 2006 Second-team All-Big 12
- 2007–08 Big 12 Male Athlete of the Year
- 2007 Big 12 Offensive Player of the Week (Oct 8, Nov 5, and Nov. 26)
- 2007 First-team Academic All-Big 12
- 2007 CoSIDA/ESPN The Magazine Academic All-District First-team
- 2007 First Team All-Big 12 (AP, Coaches)
- 2007 Big 12 Offensive Player of the Year (AP, Coaches)
- 2007 All-America Honorable Mention (Sports Illustrated)
- 2007 All-America Second-team (AP, Walter Camp, Sporting News)
- 2007 Maxwell Award semifinalist
- 2007 finalist for Manning Award, Walter Camp Award, Davey O'Brien Award
- 2007 Heisman Trophy finalist – finished 4th
- 2008 Preseason Big 12 Offensive Player of the Year
- 2008 Draddy Trophy runner-up

== Broadcasting ==
In 2023, after retiring from the NFL, Daniel began co-hosting a show on NFL Network.

In 2024, Daniel co-hosted a show on Fox Sports 1, and in 2025 Daniel became an analyst for ESPN, covering college football and the NFL.

== Personal life ==
Chase is the son of Bill and Vickie Daniel. He married his longtime girlfriend, Hillary Mullin, in 2014. They have three children together.

Daniel is a Christian. When he was with the Eagles, Daniel hosted a weekly Bible study for couples.

On March 5, 2011, Daniel announced that he was establishing and endowing an athletic scholarship for Missouri football recruits from Texas.

== See also ==
- List of Division I FBS passing yardage leaders
- List of Division I FBS passing touchdown leaders
