= Sidney B. Barham Jr. =

American Democratic politician

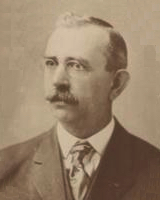

Member of the Virginia Senate from the 27th district
- In office January 12, 1916 – January 14, 1920
- Preceded by: Alexander R. Hobbs
- Succeeded by: William B. Cocke

Member of the Virginia House of Delegates for Surry and Prince George
- In office January 12, 1910 – January 10, 1912
- Preceded by: William B. Daniel
- Succeeded by: W. Stanley Burt
- In office January 10, 1906 – January 8, 1908
- Preceded by: William B. Daniel
- Succeeded by: William B. Daniel

Personal details
- Born: Sidney Baxter Barham Jr. October 19, 1872 Surry County, Virginia, U.S.
- Died: September 19, 1963 (aged 90) Surry, Virginia, U.S.
- Party: Democratic
- Spouse: Annie Thomas
- Parent: Sidney B. Barham (father)

Sidney Baxter Barham Jr. (October 19, 1872 – September 19, 1963) was an American Democratic politician who served as a member of the Virginia Senate and Virginia House of Delegates.

His father, Sidney B. Barham, served in the House of Delegates from 1893 to 1897 and again from 1903 to 1904.

Virginia House of Delegates
Preceded by William B. Daniel	Virginia Delegate for Surry and Prince George; 1906–1908; 1910–1912	Succeeded by William B. Daniel
Preceded by William B. Daniel	Virginia Delegate for Surry and Prince George; 1906–1908; 1910–1912	Succeeded by W. Stanley Burt
Senate of Virginia
Preceded by Alexander R. Hobbs	Virginia Senator for the 27th District; 1916–1920	Succeeded by William B. Cocke
