= Carroll Independent School District =

School district in Texas

Coordinates: 32.9720°N 97.1340°W

Location
- Southlake, Texas Tarrant County, 76092; United States

District information
- Type: Public
- Established: 1919; 107 years ago
- Superintendent: Dr. Jeremy Glenn
- Enrollment: 8,400 students

Other information
- Website: www.southlakecarroll.edu

The Carroll Independent School District (Carroll ISD) is an independent PK-12 school district founded in 1959. It serves the majority of the city of Southlake, Texas, United States, and portions of northwest Grapevine, far northern Colleyville, and eastern Westlake.

== History ==
In early 1919 the Carroll Common School District was formed from independent schools near Lonesome Dove and White's Church as well as Sams School. The district was named after B. Carroll, the Tarrant County Superintendent of Public Instruction. The first Carroll School, known at the time as the Carroll Hill School, was completed in 1919 and served as the district's lone school until the opening of the new Carroll High School in the 1970–1971 school year. In 1959, Carroll ISD became an independent school district. Carroll ISD initially only offered kindergarten through 8th grade; students had to travel to Grapevine for high school. The district added 9th grade in the 1961–1962 school year, and added a high school wing to the building in 1965. Carroll ISD graduated its first senior class in 1965, making Carroll ISD a K-12 grade school district.

After the emergence of a viral video in 2018 which showed several white students from this district shouting a racial slur. the school board developed a plan to foster diversity in the curriculum as well as amend the student code of conduct. There was backlash among parents, a majority of whom were white, who denounced the plan as politically motivated. A political action committee was formed by these parents that was supported by donations from conservative donors, and a lawsuit was filed against the school board. The process of implementing the diversity plan was delayed by a temporary restraining order.

In 2021, a school administrator was recorded telling teachers to present opposing viewpoints on the Holocaust. Six months after teachers at the Carroll Independent School District went public with their concerns about the administrator's advice to balance books on the Holocaust with titles that show "opposing" perspectives, district employees discovered that a new clause had been added to their annual employment contracts, stating, "You agree to not disparage, criticize, or defame the District, and its employees or officials, to the media."

== Overview ==
Carroll ISD is consistently ranked among the top-rated school districts in Texas. The district and all of its schools are often all rated "Exemplary" by the Texas Education Agency. In the 2004-2005 and 2005-2006 school years, the district was dropped to the "Recognized" ranking. In the 2006–2007 school year, the district not only regained the "Exemplary" ranking, but also became the largest all-Exemplary school district in Texas. Carroll ISD still holds this title today.

Carroll ISD also staffs all of its schools with campus resource officers. All officers are full-time members of the Southlake Police Department. The decision to expand the resource officer program (which had previously included only two officers and a sergeant) was made in the wake of the 2012 school shooting in Newtown, Connecticut. The program now includes 11 officers and one sergeant.

== Demographics ==
Carroll ISD ethnicity data 2018–2019
Ethnicity	Percent
White	64.8%
Asian	17.9%
Hispanic	9.9%
African American	2.0%
American Indian	0.2%
Pacific Islander	0.1%
Two or more races	5.1%

In 2021 the median price of a single family residence in the district was $650,000.

== Mascot ==
All of the district's schools share the same colors (green, white, and black) and the same mascot (the Dragon). The mascot was created by a student in the mid-eighties by combining an outline of Texas with a US Navy electronic warfare squadron emblem. The logo was first used in the 1980s as helmet emblems for the Carroll Dragon varsity football teams, and was gradually adopted as the district mascot. Previously, Carroll Middle School used the mascot of the Knight, using the same color scheme as the Dragons. The Knight mascot was retired in the 1990s.

== Schools ==
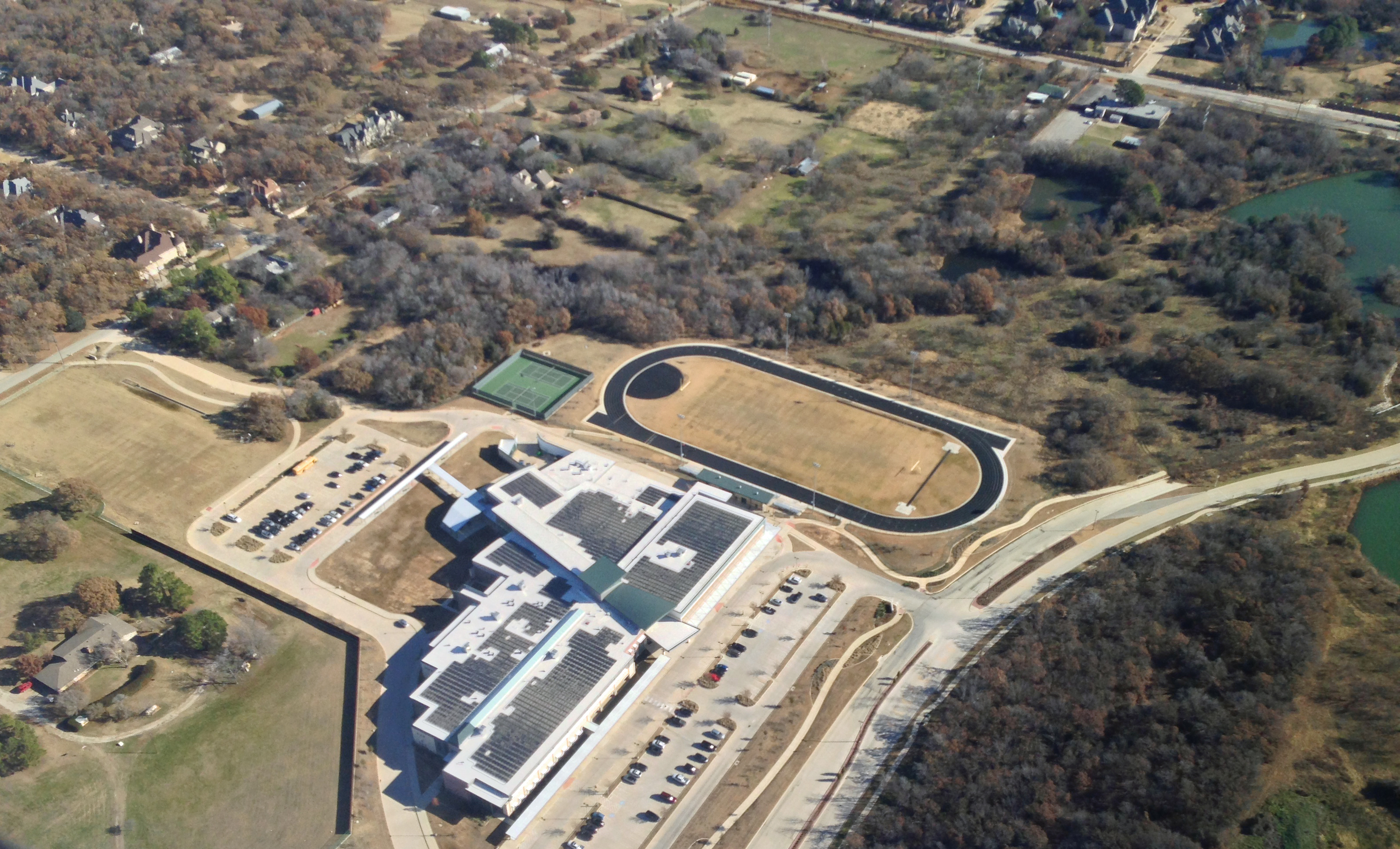
Carroll Middle School from above

=== High school (grades 9-12) ===
- Carroll Senior High School (grades 11–12)
- Carroll High School (grades 9–10)
  - 1994-96 National Blue Ribbon School

=== Middle schools (grades 7-8) ===
- Dawson Middle School
- Carroll Middle School
  - 1994-96 National Blue Ribbon School

=== Intermediate schools (grades 5-6) ===
- Durham Intermediate School
- Eubanks Intermediate School

=== Elementary schools (grades PK-4) ===
- Carroll Elementary School
  - 1993-94 National Blue Ribbon School
- Jack D Johnson Elementary School
  - 1993-94 National Blue Ribbon School
- Old Union Elementary School
- Rockenbaugh Elementary School
  - 2006 National Blue Ribbon School
- Walnut Grove Elementary School

=== Former schools ===
- Carroll Intermediate
  - 2000-01 National Blue Ribbon School
  - Closed at the end of the 2002–2003 school year with significant portions now leased to Southlake Baptist Church.
- Carroll Junior High School
  - Converted at the end of the 2001–2002 school year into Carroll High School.
- Durham Elementary School
  - Closed at the end of the 2010–2011 school year and all students moved to new Walnut Grove Elementary School. The former physical campus has wholly become part of Durham Intermediate School.
- "Old" Carroll Middle School
  - The facility was left in the summer of 2011 to move to a new campus under the same name. The building has been renovated to accommodate the needs to be housed by the CISD Administration Center.

== See also ==
- VAQ-130
