= William B. Daniel =

American politician

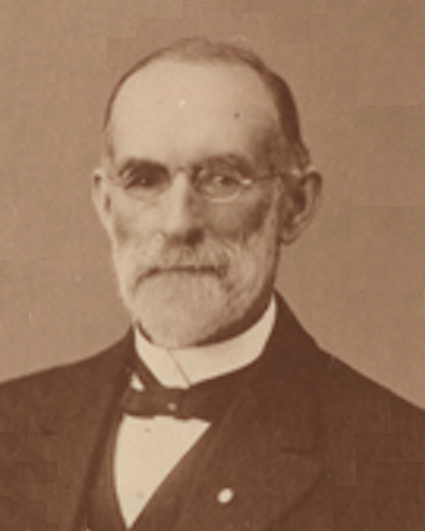
- Official portrait, 1908

Member of the Virginia House of Delegates for Surry and Prince George
- In office January 8, 1908 – January 12, 1910
- Preceded by: Sidney B. Barham Jr.
- Succeeded by: Sidney B. Barham Jr.
- In office January 13, 1904 – January 10, 1906
- Preceded by: Sidney B. Barham
- Succeeded by: Sidney B. Barham Jr.

Personal details
- Born: William Benjamin Daniel; January 14, 1840 Prince George, Virginia, U.S.
- Died: June 12, 1921 (aged 81) Richmond, Virginia, U.S.
- Party: Democratic
- Spouse: Martha Jane Tucker
- Education: Medical College of Virginia

Military service
- Allegiance: Confederate States
- Branch/service: Confederate States Army
- Unit: 14th Virginia Cavalry
- Battles/wars: American Civil War

William Benjamin Daniel (January 14, 1840 – June 12, 1921) was an American politician who served in the Virginia House of Delegates.
