= Riley Dodge =

American football player and coach (born 1988)

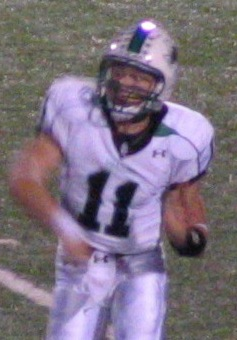
- Dodge with Carroll High School in 2006

Current position
- Title: Tight ends coach & pass game coordinator
- Team: SMU
- Conference: ACC

Biographical details
- Born: October 12, 1988 (age 38); McKinney, Texas, U.S.

Playing career
- 2008–2010: North Texas
- 2011–2012: McNeese State
- Position: Quarterback

Coaching career (HC unless noted)
- 2013–2014: Texas (QC)
- 2015–2017: Edward S. Marcus HS (TX) (OC/QB)
- 2018–2025: Carroll Senior HS (TX)
- 2026–present: SMU (TE/PGC)

Riley Dodge (born October 12, 1988) is an American football coach and former player who is the tight ends coach and pass game coordinator for the SMU Mustangs. He was the head coach at Carroll Senior High School from 2018 until 2025.

== Early life ==
Riley Dodge was born on October 12, 1988. His father, Todd Dodge, is a former University of Texas quarterback and current head coach at Southlake Carrol Senior High School in Southlake, Texas. His mother is Elizabeth Neptune Dodge daughter of former Westlake Head Coach Ebbie Neptune.

== High school career ==
Dodge prepped at Carroll High School in Southlake, Texas, where he was coached by his father and later Hal Wasson. During his freshman and sophomore seasons, Dodge played behind the former Alabama Crimson Tide quarterback Greg McElroy. As a junior, Dodge gained 4,184 yards and 54 touchdowns passing, plus 1,119 yards and 13 scores rushing in Todd Dodge's trademark no-huddle spread offense. His 54 TD passes tied fellow Southlake Carroll alumnus Chase Wasson for third all-time in Texas high school football history. Southlake Carroll won the 5A Texas state championship in 2006 with a 43–29 win over Austin Westlake.

Playing for coach Wasson as a senior, Dodge threw for 3,445 yards and 39 touchdowns in 2007. Southlake Carroll lost to Abilene in the regional semifinals, ending a 58-game winning streak against Texas teams.

== College career ==
Growing up as a Texas Longhorns fan, Dodge verbally committed to play for Mack Brown in February 2007. However, he later changed his mind, and eventually signed a letter of intent to play at University of North Texas for his father. While at North Texas, he played quarterback and later moved to wide receiver. In January 2010, he announced his intention to leave North Texas and enrolled at McNeese State University in Lake Charles where he had two years of eligibility left to play football. His father retired from coaching after the 2021 football season.

== Later life ==
On April 16, 2013, Dodge was hired at The University of Texas as a quality control quarterbacks coach.

Dodge began his high school coaching career in February 2015, at Flower Mound Marcus High School in Flower Mound, Texas where he was hired as the offensive coordinator and quarterbacks coach. He guided the Marauder offense for three seasons (2015–2017) when the team posted a combined record of 17–7, and included a final state ranking of #23 in the Texas following the 2015–16 season.

In April 2018, Dodge returned to Southlake to become the head coach of the Carroll football team. Dodge has led the Dragons to the state playoffs in every season since becoming the Carroll Head Coach and, in 2020, led the Dragons to the Texas UIL Class 6A Division 1 State Championship game. The Dragons finished as the 6A Division 1 state runner-up, beaten by his father's team, Austin Westlake, 52–34. In the 2021 campaign, Dodge led the Dragons to (14–1) record, losing to Duncanville in the semifinals of the 6A Division 1 state playoffs.
