= Southlake, Texas =

City in Texas, U.S.

- City
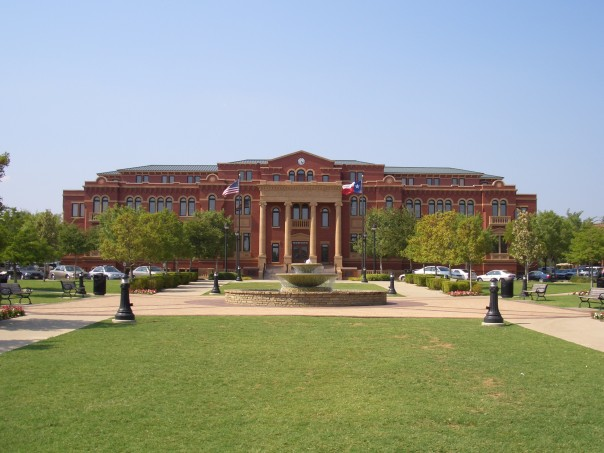
- Southlake City Hall, Southlake Town Square

- Location of Southlake in Tarrant County, Texas
- Coordinates: 32°56′48″N 97°8′43″W
- Country: United States
- State: Texas
- Counties: Tarrant, Denton
- Incorporated: 1956

Government
  - Type: Council-Manager
  - Mayor: Shawn McCaskill
  - City Council: Council members: Kathy Talley; Randy Robbins; Frances Scharli; Ronell Smith; Amy Torres Lepp; Randy Williamson

Area
  - Total: 22.42 sq mi (58.08 km^{2})
  - Land: 21.83 sq mi (56.55 km^{2})
  - Water: 0.59 sq mi (1.54 km^{2}) 2.45%
- Elevation: 663 ft (202 m)

Population (2020)
  - Total: 31,265
  - Estimate (2021): 31,105
  - Density: 1,432/sq mi (552.9/km^{2})
- Time zone: UTC-6 (CST)
  - Summer (DST): UTC-5 (CDT)
- ZIP code: 76092
- Area codes: 682,817, 214,469,972
- FIPS code: 48-69032
- GNIS feature ID: 2411945
- Website: cityofsouthlake.com

Southlake is a city located predominantly in Tarrant County with minor areas extending into Denton County in the U.S. state of Texas. Southlake is a suburb of Dallas/Fort Worth. As of the 2020 census, it had a population of 31,265.

== History ==
The Southlake area was settled in the 1840s but was not incorporated as Southlake until 1956, four years after the construction of Grapevine Lake was completed. Before incorporation, the settlements of Whites Chapel, Dove, Union Church, and Jellico made up present-day Southlake. The nearby town of Hurst had intended to annex the area that is now Southlake in 1956, but residents voted on Sept. 25, 1956 to form the town of Southlake. Anthony Gail Eubanks was elected the first mayor, and his daughter chose the name Southlake due to its proximity to the newly completed Grapevine Lake. The area remained rural until the completion of the DFW International Airport in the 1970s. Due to the close proximity to the airport, Southlake became a boomburb throughout the 1980s, 1990s and 2000s.

== Geography ==
According to the United States Census Bureau, the city has a total area of 22.5 square miles (58 km^{2}), of which 21.9 square miles (57 km^{2}) is land and 0.6 square miles (1.6 km^{2}) (2.45%) is water.

It is in proximity to Dallas–Fort Worth International Airport.

== Demographics ==
Historical population
Census	Pop.	Note	%±
1960	1,023		—
1970	2,031		98.5%
1980	2,808		38.3%
1990	7,065		151.6%
2000	21,519		204.6%
2010	26,575		23.5%
2020	31,265		17.6%
2023 (est.)	31,137		−0.4%
U.S. Decennial Census

=== 2020 census ===
As of the 2020 census, Southlake had a population of 31,265, 9,543 households, and 8,398 families residing in the city. The median age was 42.9 years, 28.8% of residents were under the age of 18, and 13.0% of residents were 65 years of age or older. For every 100 females there were 99.2 males, and for every 100 females age 18 and over there were 96.3 males age 18 and over.

98.8% of residents lived in urban areas, while 1.2% lived in rural areas.

Of the households, 49.3% had children under the age of 18 living in them. Of all households, 83.9% were married-couple households, 5.8% were households with a male householder and no spouse or partner present, and 8.8% were households with a female householder and no spouse or partner present. About 7.4% of all households were made up of individuals and 4.5% had someone living alone who was 65 years of age or older.

There were 9,810 housing units, of which 2.7% were vacant. The homeowner vacancy rate was 1.1% and the rental vacancy rate was 8.1%.

Racial composition as of the 2020 census
Race	Number	Percent
White	22,043	70.5%
Black or African American	765	2.4%
American Indian and Alaska Native	82	0.3%
Asian	4,853	15.5%
Native Hawaiian and Other Pacific Islander	11	0.0%
Some other race	428	1.4%
Two or more races	3,083	9.9%
Hispanic or Latino (of any race)	2,387	7.6%

According to a 2019 estimate, the median income for a household in the city was in excess of $240,248, higher than any other city in the DFW Metroplex, and the median income for a family was $176,259. The mean household income for Southlake is $216,393. Males had a median income of $100,000 versus $46,042 for females. The per capita income for the city was $47,597. As of 2010, 43% of homes had an income of more than $200,000. About 1.3% of families and 1.8% of the population were below the poverty line, including 2.0% of those under age 18 and 2.1% of those age 65 or over.

== Economy ==
Sabre Holdings, an S&P 500 company, is headquartered in Southlake in the Solana business park. Industrial businesses include gasoline storage and distribution and concrete works on the east side of town off Highway 114 near DFW Airport.

Southlake is well known for its Southlake Town Square project, a shopping center located on State Highway 114 and Southlake Boulevard. A plan was approved in March 2005 that allowed the Town Square's area to be doubled. The new additions to Town Square were completed in the summer of 2006, making it one of the most popular shopping centers in the Metroplex.

=== Top employers ===
The largest employers in the city are, as of January 2023:

#	Employer	# of employees
1	Sabre Holdings	2,550
2	TD Ameritrade	2,230
3	Carroll ISD	1,176
4	Verizon Wireless	685
5	Keller Williams	650
6	Gateway Church	600

== Government ==
Incorporated in 1956, the City of Southlake's home rule charter was approved by voters on April 4, 1987, operating under a Council-Manager form of government. Services provided by the City under general governmental functions include public events, public safety, planning and development, engineering, street maintenance, parks operation and maintenance, recreation, library services, and general administrative services. According to the city's 2013–2014 Comprehensive Annual Financial Report, the city's various funds had $104.2 million in revenues, $79.6 million in expenditures, $678.6 million in total assets, $182.1 million in total liabilities, and $108.8 million in cash and investments.

== Education ==
The vast majority of Southlake is in the Carroll Independent School District. This school district contains the following schools:

Elementary:

- Carroll Elementary School
- Old Union Elementary School
- Rockenbaugh Elementary School
- Walnut Grove Elementary School
- Johnson Elementary School

Intermediate:

- Eubanks Intermediate School
- Durham Intermediate School

Middle:

- Dawson Middle School
- Carroll Middle School

High schools:

- Carroll High School (grades 9–10)
- Carroll Sr. High School (grades 11–12)

A number of private schools are also located in Southlake, among them:

- The Clariden School (Pre-K–12th grades Project-Based Learning)
- Fusion Academy Southlake (Middle and High School national chain)
- Southlake Montessori (Elementary)

Southlake is also home to a private Christian university, The King's University.

== Transportation ==
There is no bus or other public transport within city limits. The nearest train station is Grapevine-Main Street station at around 4 mi (6.4 km) distance from the town center.

=== Airport ===
- Dallas/Fort Worth International Airport

=== Highways ===
- Texas 26
- Texas 114
- FM 1709
- FM 1938

== Notable people ==
- Eduardo Bolsonaro, Brazilian politician
- Terry Bradshaw, professional football player
- Kyle Brown, soccer player
- John Burkett, professional baseball player
- Ruth Buzzi, actress and comedian
- Giovanni Capriglione, Republican politician
- Frank Cornish, professional football player
- Chase Daniel, professional football player
- Jon Daniels, professional baseball general manager
- Riley Dodge, college football player
- Greg Ellis, professional football player
- Cade Foster, college football player
- Kennedy Fuller, soccer player
- Chris Gronkowski, professional football player
- Garrett Hartley, professional football player
- Hailey Hernandez, olympic diver
- Ken Hill, professional baseball player
- Kenny Hill Jr., college football quarterback
- Julius Jones, professional football player
- Lindsay Jones, voice actor, Internet personality
- Dana Loesch, conservative political activist and commentator
- Russell Maryland, professional football player
- Mark McLemore, professional baseball player
- David Murphy, professional baseball player
- Terrence Newman, professional football player
- Darren Oliver, professional baseball player
- Hudson Potts, professional baseball player
- J. Paul Raines, CEO of GameStop
- Rory Sabbatini, professional golfer
- Sam Schwartzstein, college football player
- Marcus Spears, professional football player
- Ross Stripling, professional baseball player
- Pat Summerall, professional football player, sports announcer
- Tony Tolbert, professional football player
- DeMarcus Ware, professional football player
- Yang Yong-eun, professional golfer

== Sister cities ==
Southlake has a sister city relationship with Tome, Miyagi, Japan, and a friendship city relationship with Wuzhong, Suzhou, China. These relationships consist of student exchange programs and adult delegations between the cities.
