= 2018 Kansas City Chiefs–Los Angeles Rams game =

3rd highest scoring NFL game in history

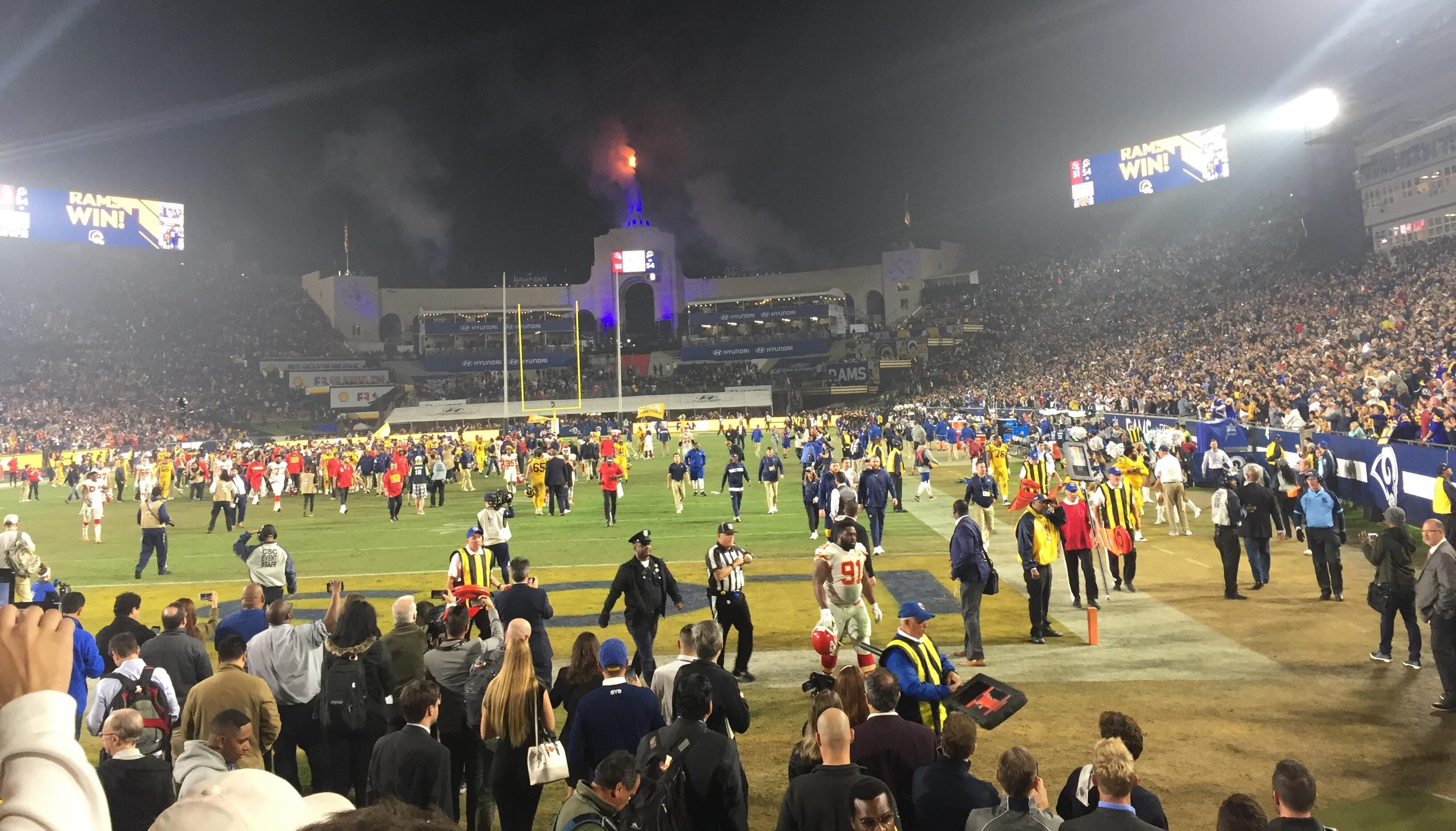
- Los Angeles Memorial Coliseum, immediately following the Rams' victory. The Olympic cauldron is lit in the background.
Kansas City Chiefs (9–1)	Los Angeles Rams (9–1)
51	54
Head coach: Andy Reid	Head coach: Sean McVay
	1	2	3	4	Total
KC	7	16	7	21	51
LAR	13	10	17	14	54
- Date: November 19, 2018
- Stadium: Los Angeles Memorial Coliseum; Los Angeles, California
- Favorite: Rams by 1
- Referee: Clete Blakeman
- Attendance: 77,002

TV in the United States
- Network: ESPN
- Announcers: Joe Tessitore (play-by-play); Jason Witten; Booger McFarland (color analysts); Lisa Salters (sideline reporter)

Radio in the United States
- Network: Westwood One
- Announcers: Kevin Harlan (play-by-play); Kurt Warner (color analyst); D'Marco Farr (sideline reporter)

On November 19, 2018, the Los Angeles Rams hosted the Kansas City Chiefs in a National Football League (NFL) regular-season game that is the third-highest-scoring game in the league's history. It was played at the Los Angeles Memorial Coliseum in Los Angeles after the original venue, Estadio Azteca in Mexico City, was ruled out due to poor field conditions.

Televised nationally by ESPN on Monday Night Football, the game was won by the Rams, 54–51. The two teams combined for 105 points, including 21 scored by defenses, and the game set numerous other records: the highest-scoring Monday Night Football game, the highest score by a losing team in NFL history (to date, the Chiefs are the only team in NFL history to score at least 50 points and still lose), and the first NFL game where both teams topped fifty points. The game saw six lead changes, including four in the fourth quarter. The two teams also combined for 1,001 yards in total offense.

The game was hailed as an "instant classic" and is regarded as one of the greatest games ever played.

== Background ==
Notably, the Chiefs and Rams formerly shared an instate rivalry in Missouri when the latter played as the St. Louis Rams from 1995 to 2015. Kansas City had won all six regular season games during that era. This game was the first regular season meeting between the teams after the Rams' return to Los Angeles.

Both the Chiefs and Rams came into the game at 9–1. The Chiefs' only loss was to the New England Patriots in Week 6, while the Rams' only loss was to the New Orleans Saints in Week 9. Both teams came in the game with the top two highest scoring offenses.

The inter-conference matchup was originally slated to be part of the NFL International Series, and was scheduled to be played at Estadio Azteca in Mexico City, Mexico which had hosted games the previous two seasons. However, the playing field was found to be in deficient condition after rains earlier in the month and a heavy event schedule, which had included a Shakira concert, a soccer match played by Cruz Azul, and an event for the Mexican political party Morena. As league and stadium officials evaluated the scene, pictures of the poor conditions began to circulate on social media. Unable to remedy the situation in time for the game, the NFL announced that the game would be moved to Los Angeles just six days before the game was to be played. Chiefs CEO Clark Hunt said "[The move is] 100 percent [about] player safety...", as the NFL faced pressure from players who reportedly considered sitting out the game rather than risk potential injury.

League rules require the designated home team (in this case, the Rams) to maintain availability of their home stadium as a contingency. Team officials and personnel worked quickly to secure facilities, logistics and event staff for the game, as the Rams were not scheduled to play at the Coliseum again for another month. The cancellation of the game in Mexico City was a disappointment to the NFL and local officials, and in particular to fans of both teams who had spent thousands of dollars for tickets and travel costs. Tickets purchased through either the Rams or Chiefs were refunded, and several air carriers offered travel credits for fans who had booked flights.

Added to the challenge of putting on the game itself was that the Greater Los Angeles area had itself been reeling in the wake of the Thousand Oaks shooting on November 7, in which 12 people were gunned down at a restaurant in Thousand Oaks, California, and the Woolsey Fire which broke out a day later. As the fire continued to rage, Rams staff were forced to evacuate the team's administrative offices in Agoura Hills as well as their practice facility at Cal Lutheran University in Thousand Oaks. The fire continued to burn for nearly two weeks, including the time of the game itself. Many Rams employees were personally affected by the Woolsey Fire, with some being evacuated multiple times from their homes and nearby hotels as the fire threatened local communities. The Rams organization covered all emergency expenses for club personnel during the crisis.

The Rams players and coaches had already traveled to Colorado Springs, Colorado in order to prepare for the high-altitude conditions they expected to encounter in Mexico. With the game being moved to Los Angeles and their homes and practice facility still under threat from the fire, the Rams opted to stay in Colorado and continue with their scheduled activities, which included closed practice sessions held at the Air Force Academy. Additionally, Rams owner Stan Kroenke chartered a plane to bring family members to join the team at the Broadmoor Resort in Colorado Springs.

On Monday, November 19, 2018, a capacity crowd was on hand as the Rams and Chiefs prepared to face off for the Coliseum's first Monday Night NFL game since 1985, and the Rams' first Monday Night game there since 1979. The Rams distributed more than 3,000 game tickets to first responders and people affected by the shooting and fires, and towels featuring the "LATogether" logo were handed out to fans attending the game. The Ventura County Sheriff’s Honor Guard presented the colors as members of the Cal Lutheran University choir performed the national anthem before the game. Karen and Jordan Helus, wife and son of Ventura County Sheriff Sgt. Ron Helus, who was slain in the Thousand Oaks shooting, performed the ceremonial lighting of the Coliseum's Olympic torch just before kickoff, and local mayors of the stricken communities participated in the coin toss.

== Game summary ==
=== First quarter ===
Receiving the opening kickoff, the Rams drove 75 yards in seven plays, with quarterback Jared Goff finding wide receiver Robert Woods in the end zone for a 7-yard touchdown pass, with kicker Greg Zuerlein missing the point-after attempt. Following a Chiefs punt, the Rams mounted a 10-play, 83-yard drive that ended with Goff connecting with wide receiver Josh Reynolds from four yards out and (with a successful Zuerlein PAT) a 13–0 lead for Los Angeles. The Chiefs struck back quickly on their next drive as running back Kareem Hunt had a 27-yard run while quarterback Patrick Mahomes completed three straight passes for 48 yards, the last going 25 yards to wide receiver Tyreek Hill for a touchdown. The Rams, who benefited from nine penalties called on the Chiefs in the opening period, started from their own 16 and ended the first quarter with 3rd-and-goal at the Kansas City 5-yard-line.

=== Second quarter ===
Following an incomplete pass, Zuerlein converted a 23-yard field goal to put the Rams up 16–7. From there, Mahomes and Hunt led the Chiefs down to L.A.'s 1-yard-line. But on 3rd-and-goal, Hunt was tackled for a 1-yard loss by Rams strong safety John Johnson, forcing Kansas City to settle for a 21-yard field goal by Harrison Butker. On the Rams' next drive, Goff was sacked twice, the second by defensive end Allen Bailey, who stripped Goff of the ball and recovered the fumble himself at the Ram 21. The Chiefs cashed in quickly as Mahomes hit Hunt for a 21-yard screen pass that with Butker's PAT put Kansas City on top 17–16. The Rams stalled on their next drive, but punter Johnny Hekker's 55-yard punt pinned the Chiefs inside their own 10. The Chiefs moved out to their own 22, when on 2nd-and-8 just after the two-minute warning, Mahomes was sacked by Rams defensive tackle Aaron Donald and separated from the ball, which was picked up by linebacker Samson Ebukam at the 11 and taken in for a touchdown and a 23–17 advantage for the Rams. Mahomes shook off the turnover and rallied the Chiefs by completing six passes in seven attempts on a 69-yard drive that ended with an 8-yard touchdown pass to wide receiver Chris Conley with 20 seconds remaining before halftime. However, Butker missed the extra point, and the score was tied 23–23. On the quarter's final play, Jared Goff took a knee for the Rams.

=== Halftime ===
The Chainsmokers featuring Kelsea Ballerini performed their hit single "This Feeling" on a special stage set up at the Coliseum's peristyle end during the halftime show. Following the televised portion, The Chainsmokers continued to play, with vocalist Drew Taggart performing a solo version of their previous hit song "Closer."

=== Third quarter ===
Coming out of the locker room, the Chiefs were poised to reclaim the lead, taking the second half kickoff and driving down to the Ram 25-yard-line, but Donald got to Mahomes again with another sack and forced fumble, which was recovered by defensive end John Franklin-Myers at the Kansas City 46. From there, Jared Goff completed four passes to guide the Rams to the Chief 7. Finding no one open on 3rd-and-goal, Goff ran it in himself for the touchdown, lobbing the football over the crossbar as Los Angeles seized a 30–23 lead. The Chiefs tied things up on their next possession, with tight end Travis Kelce taking a Mahomes pass for a 33-yard catch-and-run to set up a 1st-and-goal situation. Two plays later, Mahomes and Kelce connected again for a 4-yard touchdown and a 30–30 deadlock. The Rams retaliated as Goff found running back Todd Gurley for screen passes of 19 and 13 yards. Los Angeles drove down to the Kansas City 15, where Zuerlein converted his second field goal of the night, this time from 33 yards out and a 33–30 lead. Following a touchback, Mahomes' short pass attempt was intercepted at the line of scrimmage by Ebukam, who returned it 25 yards for a touchdown (plowing over Mahomes and Hill at the goal line) to put the Rams up by 10 points, 40–30.

=== Fourth quarter ===
After the teams traded punts on the next two possessions, the Chiefs swung momentum their way with Mahomes throwing deep to a wide-open Hill for a 73-yard touchdown pass play. On the Rams' next drive, Goff was sacked by linebacker Justin Houston who stripped the ball away. Allen Bailey, who had forced and recovered a Goff fumble earlier in the game, grabbed the ball before it had a chance to hit the ground and returned it two yards for a touchdown to put Kansas City back in the lead 44–40. The Rams came back as Goff found Josh Reynolds (27 yards) and Robert Woods (36 yards) for big gains that led to a 7-yard scoring strike to tight end Gerald Everett and a 47–44 edge for L.A. Both teams went three-and-out on their next possessions before Mahomes led a six-play, 65-yard drive that ended with a 10-yard score to Conley with 2:47 remaining, Mahomes' sixth touchdown pass of the game (matching his own team record), as the Chiefs went up 51–47. But it would take only six plays for the Rams to regain the lead, as Goff found Everett deep down the right sideline. Everett beat the coverage by Chiefs safety Daniel Sorensen, gathered in the pass at the Chiefs 15, then tiptoed down the sideline to stay in bounds for the 40-yard touchdown reception and a 54–51 lead. With 1:44 left in the game, Mahomes drove the Chiefs to midfield, but a deep pass attempt was intercepted by Rams cornerback Marcus Peters, who was facing his former team for the first time. L.A. looked set to run out the clock, but a false start penalty on tackle Andrew Whitworth took the Rams out of their game plan, and they were forced to punt. Hekker, a four-time all-pro punter, then boomed his kick 68 yards into the Chiefs end zone. Tyreek Hill returned the punt 14 yards to the Kansas City 12 with under a minute remaining. Mahomes connected with Kelce and Conley for short passes, but throwing under pressure from his own 26, Mahomes' last deep pass was picked off by Rams safety Lamarcus Joyner, and Los Angeles was able to run out the remaining 13 seconds as Goff took a final kneeldown.

=== Statistics ===
Kansas City Chiefs at Los Angeles Rams – Game summary

Quarter	1	2	3	4	Total
Chiefs	7	16	7	21	51
Rams	13	10	17	14	54

at Los Angeles Memorial Coliseum, Los Angeles, California

- Date: November 19
- Game time: 7:15 p.m. CST/5:15 p.m. PST
- Game weather: 65 °F (18 °C), cloudy
- Game attendance: 77,002
- Referee: Clete Blakeman
- TV announcers (ESPN): Joe Tessitore, Jason Witten, Booger McFarland, and Lisa Salters
- Recap, Gamebook

Game information

First quarter

- LAR - Robert Woods 7-yard pass from Jared Goff (Greg Zuerlein kick failed), 12:00. Rams 6–0. Drive: 6 plays, 75 yards, 3:00.
- LAR - Josh Reynolds 4-yard pass from Jared Goff (Greg Zuerlein kick), 5:35. Rams 13–0. Drive: 10 plays, 83 yards, 4:21.
- KC - Tyreek Hill 25-yard pass from Patrick Mahomes (Harrison Butker kick), 3:25. Rams 13–7. Drive: 4 plays, 75 yards, 2:10.

Second quarter

- LAR - Greg Zuerlein 23-yard field goal, 14:54. Rams 16–7. Drive: 9 plays, 79 yards, 3:31.
- KC - Harrison Butker 21-yard field goal, 8:04. Rams 16–10. Drive: 11 plays, 73 yards, 6:50.
- KC - Kareem Hunt 21-yard pass from Patrick Mahomes (Harrison Butker kick), 6:28. Chiefs 17–16. Drive: 1 play, 21 yards, 0:09.
- LAR - Samson Ebukam 11-yard fumble return (Greg Zuerlein kick), 1:50. Rams 23–17.
- KC - Chris Conley 8-yard pass from Patrick Mahomes (Harrison Butker kick failed), 0:21. Tied 23–23. Drive: 7 plays, 69 yards, 1:37.

Third quarter

- LAR - Jared Goff 7-yard run (Greg Zuerlein kick), 10:52. Rams 30–23. Drive: 8 plays, 46 yards, 2:35.
- KC - Travis Kelce 4-yard pass from Patrick Mahomes (Harrison Butker kick), 7:09. Tied 30–30. Drive: 8 plays, 64 yards, 3:43.
- LAR - Greg Zuerlein 33-yard field goal, 2:24. Rams 33–30. Drive: 9 plays, 50 yards, 4:45.
- LAR - Samson Ebukam 25-yard interception return (Greg Zuerlein kick), 2:14. Rams 40–30.

Fourth quarter

- KC - Tyreek Hill 73-yard pass from Patrick Mahomes (Harrison Butker kick), 12:04. Rams 40–37. Drive: 3 plays, 91 yards, 1:28.
- KC - Allen Bailey 2-yard fumble return (Harrison Butker kick), 11:07. Chiefs 44–40.
- LAR - Gerald Everett 7-yard pass from Jared Goff (Greg Zuerlein kick), 9:38. Rams 47–44. Drive: 6 plays, 75 yards, 1:29.
- KC - Chris Conley 10-yard pass from Patrick Mahomes (Harrison Butker kick), 2:47. Chiefs 51–47. Drive: 8 plays, 65 yards, 3:46.
- LAR - Gerald Everett 40-yard pass from Jared Goff (Greg Zuerlein kick), 1:49. Rams 54–51. Drive: 6 plays, 75 yards, 0:58.

Top passers

- KC – Patrick Mahomes – 33/46, 478 yards, 6 TD, 3 INT
- LAR – Jared Goff – 31/49, 413 yards, 4 TD

Top rushers

- KC – Kareem Hunt – 14 rushes, 70 yards
- LAR – Todd Gurley – 12 rushes, 55 yards

Top receivers

- KC – Tyreek Hill – 10 receptions, 215 yards, 2 TD
- LAR – Brandin Cooks – 8 receptions, 107 yards, 0 TD

== Aftermath and legacy ==
The Rams went on to win three of their remaining five games to finish 13–3, winning the NFC West for the second straight season and clinching the NFC's No. 2 playoff seed and a first round bye. The Rams beat the Dallas Cowboys in the divisional round, 30–22, then defeated the New Orleans Saints in the NFC Championship Game, 26–23 in overtime, to reach Super Bowl LIII. However, the Rams lost the Super Bowl to the New England Patriots, 13–3.

The Chiefs also won three of their remaining five games to finish 12–4, earning their third straight AFC West title and clinching the AFC's top playoff seed. After defeating the Indianapolis Colts in the divisional round, 31–13, the Chiefs lost the AFC Championship game to the Patriots, 37–31 in overtime, preventing a possible Super Bowl re-match with the Rams. Quarterback Patrick Mahomes was named the 2018 NFL Most Valuable Player.

With 105 points, the game was the highest-scoring game in the history of Monday Night Football, bettering a 48–47 Green Bay Packers victory over the Washington Redskins in 1983. It was also the third-highest total score in NFL history. The only higher scores were a 1966 game in which the Washington Redskins defeated the New York Giants 72–41 (113 points), and a 2004 game in which the Cincinnati Bengals defeated the Cleveland Browns 58–48 (106 points).

ESPN's broadcast garnered an overnight rating of 11.3, the best showing for a Monday Night Football game since 2014, with an estimated live television audience of seven million viewers.

Rams quarterback Jared Goff completed 31 of 49 passes for 413 yards and five touchdowns with no interceptions, though he lost two fumbles. It was also his third fourth quarter comeback victory in four weeks, fourth of the season and fifth of his career. Wide receiver Brandin Cooks had eight receptions for 107 yards to lead the Rams in both categories. Fellow wide receiver Josh Reynolds (80 yards, one touchdown) and tight end Tyler Higbee (63 yards) both had six receptions each, while wide receiver Robert Woods added four receptions for 72 yards and a touchdown. Tight end Gerald Everett had 49 yards on three receptions, two of which went for touchdowns in the fourth quarter, including what would ultimately be the game-winning score. Rams running back Todd Gurley had 12 carries for 55 yards to add to his NFL rushing yardage lead and to put him over 1,000 yards rushing for the third time in his four-year career. However, Gurley (who also added three receptions for 39 yards) was held without a touchdown for the first time in the season, ending his team-record 13-game touchdown scoring streak, which was tied with John Riggins, George Rogers, and Jerry Rice for the third-longest in NFL history. On defense, linebacker Samson Ebukam was named NFC Defensive Player of the Week after scoring touchdowns on an interception and a fumble recovery return with three tackles and a sack. Aaron Donald had two sacks and two forced fumbles, and John Johnson led the Rams with 11 tackles.

For the Chiefs, Mahomes threw for a career-high 478 yards on 33-for-46 passing, the second-highest single-game total in Chiefs team history. Mahomes also threw for six touchdowns for the second time in 2018 (matching the team record he already shared with Hall of Famer Len Dawson), but was intercepted three times and fumbled twice. Wide receiver Tyreek Hill had the second best single-game performance of his career with 10 catches for 215 yards and two touchdowns. Tight end Travis Kelce also had 10 receptions for 127 yards and a touchdown, and wide receiver Chris Conley added seven receptions for 72 yards with two touchdowns. Running back Kareem Hunt had 14 carries for 70 yards on the ground and three receptions for 41 yards and a touchdown. Defensively, cornerback Ron Parker had a team-high eight tackles, while linebacker Anthony Hitchens, cornerback Steven Nelson, and defensive tackle Chris Jones had six tackles each, with Jones leading the Chiefs with two sacks.

This would also be Kareem Hunt's last game as a Kansas City Chief (though he returned to the team as a free agent in 2024) as the following week the team had their bye week, and on November 30 he was shown via video to have violently physically assaulted a woman, and was immediately released by the team for his actions.

At the 2019 ESPY Awards, the Chiefs–Rams battle was named "Best Game," with Mahomes and Goff accepting the award on behalf of their respective teams. The game was also named the top L.A. sports moment of 2018 by the Los Angeles Sports Council.

For NFL Network's "100 Greatest Games," the 2018 Rams–Chiefs game was ranked No. 33 on the list. It was the second-highest ranked regular season game, behind only the 1985 Chicago Bears-Miami Dolphins showdown (also on Monday Night Football), which was ranked No. 29.

It was the first regular season game that has been profiled in the ongoing NFL Films series "NFL's Greatest Games."

As of 2025, the Chiefs' total of 51 points remains the highest score achieved by a losing team in the history of professional American football.

== Records ==
=== NFL ===
- Highest scoring Monday Night game (105 points)
- First and only game in which both teams scored 50+ points
- Third highest scoring game in league history

=== Chiefs ===
- Most points scored in a loss (51)

==== Patrick Mahomes ====
- Most passing TDs in Monday Night game (6)
- Career high passing yards (478)

== Starting lineups ==
Kansas City	Position		Los Angeles
Offense
Demetrius Harris	TE		Tyler Higbee
Eric Fisher	LT		Andrew Whitworth
Cameron Erving	LG		Rodger Saffold
Austin Reiter	C		John Sullivan
Andrew Wylie	RG		Austin Blythe
Mitchell Schwartz	RT		Rob Havenstein
Tyreek Hill	WR		Josh Reynolds
Travis Kelce	TE	WR	Brandin Cooks
Patrick Mahomes	QB		Jared Goff
Sammy Watkins	WR		Robert Woods
Kareem Hunt	RB	HB	Todd Gurley
Defense
Allen Bailey	LDE	DE	Michael Brockers
Chris Jones	RDE	NT	Ndamukong Suh
Orlando Scandrick	LCB		Marcus Peters
Steven Nelson	RCB		Troy Hill
Dee Ford	LOLB	DT	Aaron Donald
Anthony Hitchens	LILB	WILL	Dante Fowler
Dorian O'Daniel	RILB	ILB	Cory Littleton
Justin Houston	ROLB	ILB	Mark Barron
Kendall Fuller	NICKE	CB	Sam Shields
Eric Murray	S	SS	John Johnson
Ron Parker	S	FS	Lamarcus Joyner

== Officials ==
- Referee: Clete Blakeman (34)
- Umpire: Ramon George (128)
- Down judge: Dana McKenzie (8)
- Line judge: Rusty Baynes (59)
- Field judge: Dale Shaw (104)
- Side judge: Brad Freeman (88)
- Back judge: Tony Steratore (112)
- Replay official: Jim Lapetina (0)

== See also ==
- List of highest scoring NFL games
- No Punt Game
- Scorigami
