= List of highest-scoring NFL games =

This is a list of the highest-scoring games in the history of the National Football League, by number of combined points. It includes both regular season and postseason games. The highest-scoring game overall was a 1966 game between the Washington Redskins and New York Giants, which produced a combined 113 points with a score of 72–41. The most points scored by one team in a single game is the 73 the Chicago Bears scored in the 1940 NFL Championship Game, which is not included on this list, as their opponents (the Washington Redskins) scored zero additional points. It also serves as the game with the largest margin of victory in NFL history.

Scoring can be achieved through touchdowns (6 points), point after touchdown (1 point), two-point conversion (2 points), a safety (1–2 points) or a field goal (3 points). In the event of a tie after four quarters, the overtime period allows scores to increase further as teams try to win it out of regulation.

== Scores ==
=== Regular season ===
Rank	Points scored	Score	Winning team	Losing team	Date	Ref
1	113	72–41	Washington Redskins	New York Giants	November 27, 1966	
2	106	58–48	Cincinnati Bengals	Cleveland Browns	November 28, 2004	
3	105	54–51	Los Angeles Rams	Kansas City Chiefs	November 19, 2018	
4	103	63–40	San Francisco 49ers	Brooklyn Dodgers	November 21, 1948	
5	101	52–49	New Orleans Saints	New York Giants	November 1, 2015	
5	101	52–49	Oakland Raiders	Houston Oilers	December 22, 1963	
7	99	51–48	Denver Broncos	Dallas Cowboys	October 6, 2013	
7	99	51–48 (OT)	Seattle Seahawks	Kansas City Chiefs	November 27, 1983	
9	98	54–44	San Diego Chargers	Pittsburgh Steelers	December 8, 1985	
9	98	63–35	Chicago Cardinals	New York Giants	October 17, 1948	
11	97	70–27	Los Angeles Rams	Baltimore Colts	October 22, 1950	
12	96	59–37	Chicago Bears	Carolina Panthers	September 13, 2026	
12	96	51–45	Cleveland Browns	Cincinnati Bengals	September 16, 2007	
12	96	51–45 (OT)	New York Jets	Miami Dolphins	September 21, 1986	
15	95	55–40	Tampa Bay Buccaneers	Los Angeles Rams	September 29, 2019	
15	95	48–47	Green Bay Packers	Washington Redskins	October 17, 1983	
17	94	48–46	San Francisco 49ers	New Orleans Saints	December 8, 2019	
18	93	51–42	New Orleans Saints	St. Louis Cardinals	November 2, 1969	
18	93	50–43	Los Angeles Chargers	New York Titans	December 18, 1960	
18	93	48–45	Seattle Seahawks	Detroit Lions	October 2, 2022	
21	91	56–35	New York Jets	Arizona Cardinals	September 28, 2008	
21	91	46–45	New York Titans	Denver Broncos	November 22, 1962	
23	90	48–42	Buffalo Bills	Detroit Lions	December 15, 2024	
23	90	70–20	Miami Dolphins	Denver Broncos	September 24, 2023	
23	90	52–38	New Orleans Saints	Detroit Lions	October 15, 2017	
23	90	49–41	San Diego Chargers	Cincinnati Bengals	November 12, 2006	
23	90	62–28	New York Jets	Tampa Bay Buccaneers	November 17, 1985	
23	90	57–33	Pittsburgh Steelers	Atlanta Falcons	December 18, 1966	
29	89	47–42	Chicago Bears	Cincinnati Bengals	November 2, 2025	
29	89	47–42	Los Angeles Chargers	Cleveland Browns	October 10, 2021	
29	89	47–42	Baltimore Ravens	Cleveland Browns	December 14, 2020	
29	89	48–41	New Orleans Saints	Arizona Cardinals	December 18, 2016	
29	89	48–41	Chicago Bears	Minnesota Vikings	October 19, 2008	
29	89	49–40	Cleveland Browns	New York Giants	December 4, 1966	
29	89	51–38	Baltimore Colts	Chicago Bears	October 4, 1958	
29	89	65–24	Los Angeles Rams	Detroit Lions	October 29, 1950	
29	89	52–37	Los Angeles Rams	New York Giants	November 14, 1948	

=== Playoffs ===
Rank	Points scored	Score	Winning team	Losing team	Date	Ref
1	96	51–45 (OT)	Arizona Cardinals	Green Bay Packers	January 10, 2010	
2	95	58–37	Philadelphia Eagles	Detroit Lions	December 30, 1995	
3	89	45–44	Indianapolis Colts	Kansas City Chiefs	January 4, 2014	
4	87	45–42	Jacksonville Jaguars	Pittsburgh Steelers	January 14, 2018	
5	86	49–37	St. Louis Rams	Minnesota Vikings	January 16, 2000	

=== Super Bowl ===
Rank	Points scored	Score	Winning team	Losing team	Date	Ref
1	75	49–26	San Francisco 49ers	San Diego Chargers	January 29, 1995	
2	74	41–33	Philadelphia Eagles	New England Patriots	February 4, 2018	
3	73	38–35	Kansas City Chiefs	Philadelphia Eagles	February 12, 2023	
4	69	52–17	Dallas Cowboys	Buffalo Bills	January 31, 1993	
4	69	48–21	Tampa Bay Buccaneers	Oakland Raiders	January 26, 2003	
5	66	35–31	Pittsburgh Steelers	Dallas Cowboys	January 21, 1979	

== Game notes ==
=== Regular season ===
==== 113 points (New York Giants vs. Washington Redskins, 1966) ====
The Washington Redskins and the New York Giants combined for a total of 113 points in one game on November 27, 1966, in Washington, D.C. The Redskins outscored the Giants 72–41. There were a total of 16 touchdowns: 10 by the Redskins and 6 by the Giants, plus a field goal by the Redskins' kicker Charlie Gogolak with only 7 seconds left. The game was played before the introduction of nets behind the goal post causing the loss of fourteen footballs to the stands. Thirteen of the footballs were lost due to extra points, and one was lost by Brig Owens who threw the ball into the crowd after he returned a fumble 70 yards for a touchdown.

==== 106 points (Cincinnati Bengals vs. Cleveland Browns, 2004) ====
On November 28, 2004, Cincinnati Bengals quarterback Carson Palmer threw for 4 touchdowns and Rudi Johnson ran for 2 more along with a career-high 202 rushing yards as the Bengals survived 413 passing yards and 5 touchdowns by Kelly Holcomb to defeat the Cleveland Browns 58–48, in the second-highest scoring game in NFL history. Deltha O'Neal returned an interception 31 yards for a touchdown in the final 2 minutes to end the Browns' comeback hopes and to cap the scoring.

==== 105 points (Kansas City Chiefs vs. Los Angeles Rams, 2018) ====
On November 19, 2018, Los Angeles Rams quarterback Jared Goff threw for 413 yards and accounted for five touchdowns (four passing, one rushing), including a game-winning 40 yard strike to tight end Gerald Everett with under 2 minutes remaining in the fourth quarter as the Rams outlasted the Kansas City Chiefs 54–51 in the highest-scoring Monday Night Football game in NFL history. In a losing effort, Chiefs quarterback Patrick Mahomes threw for 478 yards and 6 touchdowns, but threw three interceptions (one returned for a touchdown by Rams linebacker Samson Ebukam) and lost two fumbles (one returned for a touchdown also by Ebukam). The game was sealed for the Rams when Mahomes threw a desperation pass that was intercepted by Rams free safety Lamarcus Joyner. Both teams combined for 14 touchdowns and 1,001 yards. It is the only NFL game in which both teams have scored 50 points.

==== 101 points (Oakland Raiders vs. Houston Oilers, 1963) ====
Played on December 22, 1963, the game took place in the American Football League (AFL), but it was absorbed into official NFL records after the NFL–AFL merger. The Oakland Raiders defeated the Houston Oilers 52–49, combining for a total of 101 points. It was the Raiders' eighth win in a row.

Raiders placekicker Mike Mercer kicked a field goal with 4:37 left in the fourth quarter, breaking the 49–49 tie and giving the Raiders the win. Raiders quarterback Tom Flores threw for 407 yards and 6 touchdowns. The Oilers quarterback and future Hall of Famer George Blanda passed for 342 yards and 5 touchdowns. Raiders wide receiver Art Powell caught 10 passes for a total of 247 yards and 4 touchdowns. The Oilers had their own offensive threat in Willard Dewveall who had seven catches adding up to a total amount of 137 yards and four touchdowns.

==== 101 points (New York Giants vs. New Orleans Saints, 2015) ====
On November 1, 2015, the New York Giants and New Orleans Saints scored a combined 101 points. The Saints won 52–49. Notably, Saints quarterback Drew Brees tied an NFL record by throwing seven touchdown passes, and Giants quarterback Eli Manning threw six touchdown passes. The 13 touchdown passes between the two quarterbacks set an NFL record. The only field goal was scored on the final play of the game, when the Saints' Kai Forbath successfully kicked a 50-yard field goal to win the game, the longest kick of his career at the time.

==== 99 points (Seattle Seahawks vs. Kansas City Chiefs, 1983) ====
On November 27, 1983, the Seattle Seahawks defeated the visiting Kansas City Chiefs 51–48 in overtime. Seahawks running back Curt Warner rushed for 207 yards on 32 carries. Chiefs wide receiver Carlos Carson had seven catches for 149 yards and one touchdown. The game ended when placekicker Norm Johnson converted a 42-yard field goal with 1:46 left in overtime.

==== 99 points (Denver Broncos vs. Dallas Cowboys, 2013) ====
On October 6, 2013, the Dallas Cowboys hosted the Denver Broncos for a game in which 99 total points were scored, tied for fifth-highest in NFL history. Near the end of the fourth quarter the game was tied, 48–48. Cowboys quarterback Tony Romo (who achieved more than 500 passing yards for the first time in franchise history) threw a critical interception to Broncos linebacker Danny Trevathan at his own 24-yard line with 2 minutes remaining in the game. Broncos placekicker Matt Prater kicked a 28-yard field goal as time expired to give the Broncos a 51–48 win.

Broncos quarterback Peyton Manning completed 33 of 42 passes for 414 yards, throwing 4 touchdown passes and 1 interception in a winning effort. This performance prompted KCNC-TV to report, "After 5 games and 5 big wins, the Broncos are on pace to become the first team in the history of the NFL to exceed 600, maybe even 700 points, in a season. It is the most remarkable five-game stretch in the history of professional football. The numbers don't lie. What Manning has done in his first five games – his "assault" on the record books – is simply unprecedented." This would prove to be true, as the Broncos stormed all the way to score 606 points and set the NFL record for points scored in a single season.

==== 97 points (Los Angeles Rams vs. Baltimore Colts, 1950) ====
The 1950 Los Angeles Rams, the best offensive team in NFL history in terms of average points (466 in 12 games, 38.8 PPG), scored 70 points, one of only three teams to ever do so. The following week, they beat the Detroit Lions 65–24, including a shared NFL record with 41 points in one quarter. They are the only team in NFL history to score 60-or-more points twice in a season, let alone in consecutive games.

==== 96 points (Carolina Panthers vs. Chicago Bears, 2026) ====
On September 13, 2026, in Week 1, the visiting Chicago Bears defeated the Carolina Panthers 59–37. Bears quarterback Caleb Williams threw for 2 touchdowns and 269 yards, while Bears running back D'Andre Swift ran for 124 yards and 3 touchdowns. Panthers quarterback Bryce Young threw for 3 touchdowns and 361 yards. It became the highest scoring Week 1 game in NFL history.

==== 96 points (Cincinnati Bengals vs. Cleveland Browns, 2007) ====
On September 16, 2007, Ohio intrastate rivals, the Cleveland Browns and the Cincinnati Bengals battled to combine for 96 points, with the Browns defeating the Bengals 51–45. Browns quarterback Derek Anderson and Bengals quarterback Carson Palmer set or tied franchise records with 5 and 6 touchdown passes, respectively.

==== 96 points (Miami Dolphins vs. New York Jets, 1986) ====
In a September 21, 1986, AFC East showdown at Giants Stadium in East Rutherford, New Jersey, the New York Jets hosted the Miami Dolphins, combining for 96 points, with the Jets defeating the Dolphins in overtime, 51–45.

The contest featured 1,066 yards of combined offense, 59 first downs and 93 total pass attempts. Dolphins quarterback Dan Marino had 448 yards through the air and a personal best six touchdown passes, while Jets signal-caller Ken O'Brien threw for 479 yards and 4 touchdown passes. The shootout came to an end when Jets wide receiver Wesley Walker caught a 43-yard bomb touchdown from O'Brien in overtime, his fourth of the game. Walker finished with 6 catches for 179 yards. The Dolphins receiving corps was led by the "Marks Brothers", Mark Duper and Mark Clayton, combining for 328 yards receiving and 3 touchdown receptions.

==== 95 points (Washington Redskins vs. Green Bay Packers, 1983) ====
On October 17, 1983, the Washington Redskins and Green Bay Packers played on a Monday night with the Packers winning 48–47, a combined 95-point total. Redskins kicker Mark Moseley missed a field goal in the final seconds, securing the win for the Packers.

==== 95 points (Tampa Bay Buccaneers vs. Los Angeles Rams, 2019) ====
On September 29, 2019, the Tampa Bay Buccaneers and Los Angeles Rams met at the Los Angeles Memorial Coliseum in week 4 of the season. The Rams entered the game with a 3–0 record, while the Buccaneers came in at 1–2. The Buccaneers were 9.5-point underdogs against the Rams, who had reached the Super Bowl the previous season. However, the Buccaneers won 55–40, with their quarterback, Jameis Winston, throwing for 385 yards and four touchdowns. Rams quarterback Jared Goff completed 45 passes (t-2nd most all time) out of 68 attempts (t-3rd most all time) for 517 yards (t-8th most all time) in the losing effort.

==== 93 points (New Orleans Saints vs. St. Louis Cardinals, 1969) ====
The 0–6 New Orleans Saints got their first win of the season against the St. Louis Cardinals, in a contest that featured 6 touchdown passes by each quarterback, the Saints' Billy Kilmer and the Cardinals' Charley Johnson, who threw three in the 4th quarter with his team down 21–51. It's one of only two such games in NFL history, together with the 2015 Saints-Giants game above.

==== 93 points (Seattle Seahawks at Detroit Lions, 2022) ====
The Seattle Seahawks pulled off a 48–45 victory over the Detroit Lions to improve to 2–2 in a game where the Seahawks never punted. Seahawks quarterback Geno Smith passed for 302 yards and two touchdowns, and running back Rashaad Penny had two long rushing touchdowns in the second half. Lions quarterback Jared Goff threw for 378 yards and four touchdowns, but also threw a key interception in the second half. The Lions set an NFL record for the most combined points scored and allowed (281) through a team's first four games.

=== Playoffs ===
==== 96 points (Green Bay Packers vs. Arizona Cardinals, 2009 NFC wild card game) ====
In the 2009–10 playoffs, the Arizona Cardinals and Green Bay Packers combined for 96 points in a 51–45 overtime Cardinals win when Cardinals defensive back Michael Adams strip-sacked Packers quarterback Aaron Rodgers and Cardinals linebacker Karlos Dansby picked up the loose football, returning it 17 yards for the winning score.

==== 95 points (Detroit Lions vs. Philadelphia Eagles, 1995 NFC Wild Card Game) ====
In a December 30, 1995 Wild Card playoff game, the Philadelphia Eagles and Detroit Lions combined for 95 points in what was the NFL's highest scoring postseason game until 2009. The Eagles dominated the game on seven Lions turnovers, winning 58–37. The Eagles scored 31 points in the second quarter alone, and led 38–7 at halftime. They extended their lead to 51–7 with nine minutes left in the third quarter. After that, the Lions scored four touchdowns while the Eagles added another.

==== 89 points (Indianapolis Colts vs. Kansas City Chiefs, 2013 AFC Wild Card Game) ====
On January 4, 2014, the Indianapolis Colts and the Kansas City Chiefs played in a Saturday evening 2013 NFL Wild Card playoff game. The teams combined for 89 points, with the Colts winning 45–44. Following an early second half Chiefs touchdown, the Colts rallied back for a 28-point comeback, the second largest comeback in NFL playoff history. (Note: Behind only "The Comeback")

=== Super Bowl ===
==== 75 points (Super Bowl XXIX: San Diego Chargers vs. San Francisco 49ers) ====
The highest-scoring Super Bowl was Super Bowl XXIX on January 29, 1995, in which the NFC champion San Francisco 49ers defeated the AFC champion San Diego Chargers 49–26 for a combined 75 points. This Super Bowl win was the only win for Steve Young in his career as a starter, although he won two as a backup as well.

==== 74 points (Super Bowl LII: New England Patriots vs. Philadelphia Eagles) ====
The second highest-scoring Super Bowl was Super Bowl LII on February 4, 2018, in which the NFC champion Philadelphia Eagles defeated the AFC champion and defending champion New England Patriots 41–33 for a combined 74 points. There were multiple missed PAT attempts, including one missed kick from both teams and 2 unsuccessful 2-point conversion attempts from the Eagles, and a field goal attempt from the Patriots near the beginning of the second quarter that hit the upright. The 33 points the Patriots scored was at that time the highest by any Super Bowl-losing team in history before being surpassed 5 years later by the Eagles with 35 points in their loss in Super Bowl LVII.

==== 73 points (Super Bowl LVII: Kansas City Chiefs vs. Philadelphia Eagles) ====
The third highest-scoring Super Bowl was Super Bowl LVII on February 12, 2023, in which the AFC champion Kansas City Chiefs defeated the NFC champion Philadelphia Eagles 38–35 for a combined 73 points. There was one missed field goal from the Chiefs and on the final possession from the Chiefs, at the one-yard line, they took a knee three times to run the clock out and kicked a successful field goal instead of going for a one-yard touchdown. If they would have successfully scored the touchdown, they would have the highest-scoring Super Bowl of all time. The 35 points the Eagles scored is the highest by any Super Bowl-losing team in history.

== See also ==
- List of 100-point games in college football
