= 2018 Kansas City Chiefs season =

Franchise's 49th season in the National Football League

- Owner: The Hunt family (Clark Hunt Chairman and CEO)
- General manager: Brett Veach
- Head coach: Andy Reid
- Offensive coordinator: Eric Bieniemy
- Defensive coordinator: Bob Sutton
- Home stadium: Arrowhead Stadium

Results
- Record: 12–4
- Division place: 1st AFC West
- Playoffs: Won Divisional Playoffs (vs. Colts) 31–13; Lost AFC Championship (vs. Patriots) 31–37 (OT)
- All-Pros: 5: QB Patrick Mahomes (1st team); FLEX Tyreek Hill (1st team); TE Travis Kelce (1st team); RT Mitchell Schwartz (1st team); WR Tyreek Hill (2nd team); DT Chris Jones (2nd team)
- Pro Bowlers: 6: QB Patrick Mahomes; FB Anthony Sherman; WR Tyreek Hill; TE Travis Kelce; T Eric Fisher; OLB Dee Ford
- Team MVP: Patrick Mahomes
- Team ROY: Andrew Wylie

Uniform
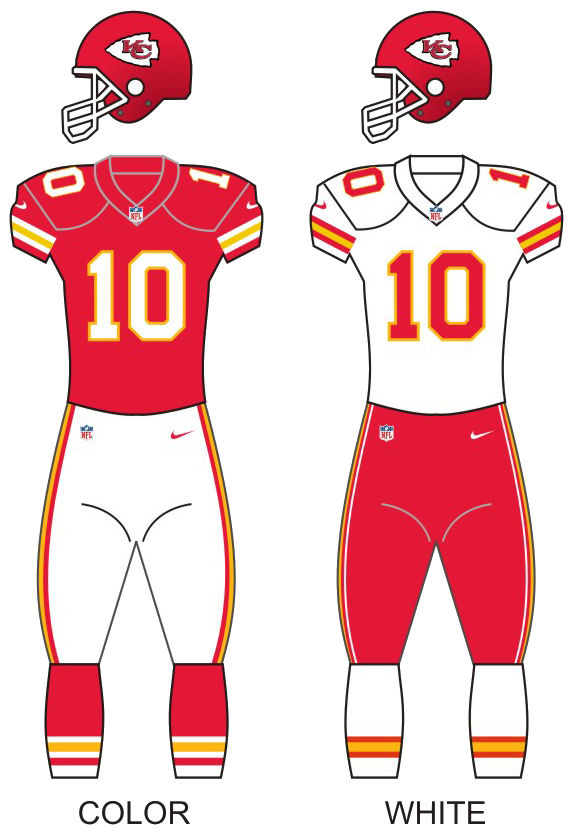

The 2018 season was the Kansas City Chiefs' 49th in the National Football League (NFL), their 59th overall, their sixth under head coach Andy Reid, and their second under general manager Brett Veach. The Chiefs finished 12–4 and won their third consecutive AFC West title, made their fourth consecutive playoff appearance, but lost to the eventual Super Bowl champion New England Patriots 37–31 in overtime in the AFC Championship Game. Quarterback Patrick Mahomes won the AP NFL MVP award, becoming the first Chiefs player ever to be named MVP.

== Season summary ==
In the offseason the Chiefs had several major changes, including trading 2-time Pro Bowler Marcus Peters, as well as Alex Smith. The team also voided the final year of the contract of their longest tenured player Derrick Johnson and they released long time linebacker Tamba Hali.

Under first year starting quarterback Patrick Mahomes, the Chiefs would start the season 5–0 for the second consecutive year before losing to the New England Patriots. The Chiefs then won their next four games before losing again to the Los Angeles Rams. A Week 14 win over the Baltimore Ravens clinched the Chiefs' fourth consecutive playoff appearance. After defeating their rival, the Oakland Raiders 35–3 in Week 17, the Chiefs clinched their third consecutive division title and home-field advantage throughout the playoffs for the first time since 1997.

In the playoffs, the Chiefs advanced to the AFC Championship Game for the first time since 1993 by defeating the Indianapolis Colts, 31–13 in the divisional round. This win ended the Chiefs' 6-game home playoff losing streak dating back to 1993. It was only the Chiefs' second win in their last 13 playoff games. In the AFC Championship Game, the Chiefs lost to the eventual Super Bowl champion New England Patriots, 37–31 in overtime. Two days after the loss, defensive coordinator Bob Sutton was fired following multiple NFL analysts criticizing his lack of adjustments in the AFC Championship Game, as well as other games throughout the season.

== NFL Top 100 ==
The Chiefs had three players ranked in NFL Network's annual Top 100 players countdown, the fewest the team has had on the list since 2012.

Rank	Player	Position	Change
24	Travis Kelce	TE	▲2
33	Kareem Hunt*	RB	NR
40	Tyreek Hill	WR/PR	▼4

*Did not finish the season on the roster

== Offseason ==
=== Draft ===
2018 Kansas City Chiefs draft
Round	Pick	Player	Position	College	Notes
2	46	Breeland Speaks	Defensive end	Ole Miss	
3	75	Derrick Nnadi	Defensive tackle	Florida State	
3	100	Dorian O'Daniel	Linebacker	Clemson	
4	124	Armani Watts	Safety	Texas A&M	
6	196	Tremon Smith	Cornerback	Central Arkansas	
6	198	Kahlil McKenzie	Defensive tackle	Tennessee	
Made roster

Trades

- The Chiefs traded their first round selection (No. 22 overall), along with their 2017 first and third round selections to the Buffalo Bills in exchange for the Bills' 2017 first-round selection.
- The Chiefs received a third round selection (No. 78 overall) and cornerback Kendall Fuller from the Washington Redskins in exchange for quarterback Alex Smith.
- The Chiefs traded their fifth round selection (159th overall) to the Cleveland Browns in exchange for offensive tackle Cameron Erving.
- The Chiefs traded their seventh round selection (240th overall) to the San Francisco 49ers in exchange for cornerback Kenneth Acker.
- The Chiefs received a seventh round draft selection (233rd overall) from the Arizona Cardinals in exchange for cornerback Marcus Cooper.
- The Chiefs traded cornerback Marcus Peters and their sixth round selection (209th overall, a compensatory pick) to the Los Angeles Rams for their fourth round selection (124th overall) and their second round selection in the 2019 NFL Draft.
- The Chiefs received a seventh round draft selection (243rd overall) from the Tennessee Titans in exchange for defensive tackle David King.
- The Chiefs received a 2nd round pick (46th overall) and a 3rd round pick (100th overall) from the Cincinnati Bengals in exchange for the Chiefs' 2nd round pick (54th overall) and 3rd round pick (78th overall).
- The Chiefs received a 3rd round pick (75th overall) from the Baltimore Ravens in exchange for their 3rd round pick (86th overall) and their 4th round pick (122nd overall)
- The Chiefs received a 6th round pick (198th overall) from the New England Patriots in exchange for two 7th round picks (233rd overall and 243rd overall)

== Staff ==
2018 Kansas City Chiefs staff
Front office: Chairman/CEO – Clark Hunt; President – Mark Donovan; General manager – Brett Veach; Director of football administration – Brandt Tilis; Salary cap & legal executive – Chris Shea; Director of player personnel – Mike Borgonzi; Director of college scouting – Ryan Poles; Assistant director of college scouting – Ryne Nutt; College Scouting Coordinator – Greg Castillo; Director of pro personnel – Tim Terry; Head coaches: Head coach – Andy Reid; Assistant head coach/special teams coordinator – Dave Toub; Offensive coaches: Offensive coordinator – Eric Bieniemy; Quarterbacks – Mike Kafka; Running backs – Deland McCullough; Wide receivers – Greg Lewis; Tight ends – Tom Melvin; Offensive line – Andy Heck; Assistant offensive line – Corey Matthaei; Offensive quality control – David Girardi; Pass game analyst/assistant quarterbacks – Joe Bleymaier	Defensive coaches: Defensive coordinator – Bob Sutton; Defensive line – Britt Reid; Outside linebackers – Mike Smith; Inside linebackers – Mark DeLeone; Defensive backs – Emmitt Thomas; Secondary/cornerbacks – Al Harris; Defensive Assistant – Alex Whittingham; Defensive quality control – Terry Bradden; Defensive quality control – Jay Valai; Special teams coaches: Assistant special teams – Rod Wilson; Strength and conditioning: Strength and conditioning – Barry Rubin; Assistant strength and conditioning – Travis Crittenden; Assistant strength and conditioning – Devin Woodhouse; Sports science/conditioning – Ryan Reynolds

== Final roster ==
2018 Kansas City Chiefs roster
Quarterbacks (QB): 4 Chad Henne; 15 Patrick Mahomes; Running backs (RB): 42 Anthony Sherman FB; 32 Spencer Ware; 30 Charcandrick West; 26 Damien Williams; 31 Darrel Williams; Wide receivers (WR): 81 Kelvin Benjamin; 17 Chris Conley; 12 Gehrig Dieter; 10 Tyreek Hill; 19 Marcus Kemp; 11 Demarcus Robinson; 14 Sammy Watkins; Tight ends (TE): 84 Demetrius Harris; 87 Travis Kelce; 82 Deon Yelder	Offensive linemen (OL): 73 Jeff Allen G/T; 75 Cameron Erving G; 72 Eric Fisher T; 66 Kahlil McKenzie G; 61 Mitch Morse C; 67 Jimmy Murray T; 62 Austin Reiter C; 71 Mitchell Schwartz T; 77 Andrew Wylie G; Defensive linemen (DL): 97 Allen Bailey DE; 74 Justin Hamilton NT; 95 Chris Jones DE; 91 Derrick Nnadi NT; 98 Xavier Williams NT	Linebackers (LB): 55 Dee Ford OLB; 53 Anthony Hitchens ILB; 50 Justin Houston OLB; 92 Tanoh Kpassagnon OLB; 56 Ben Niemann ILB; 44 Dorian O'Daniel ILB; 59 Reggie Ragland ILB; 57 Breeland Speaks OLB; 51 Frank Zombo OLB; Defensive backs (DB): 29 Eric Berry SS; 23 Kendall Fuller CB; 24 Jordan Lucas SS; 21 Eric Murray SS; 20 Steven Nelson CB; 38 Ron Parker FS; 22 Orlando Scandrick CB; 39 Tremon Smith CB; 49 Daniel Sorensen S; 35 Charvarius Ward CB; Special teams (ST): 7 Harrison Butker K; 2 Dustin Colquitt P; 41 James Winchester LS	Practice squad: 6 Josh Crockett WR; 46 Raymond Davison ILB; 60 Ryan Hunter G; 90 Joey Ivie NT; 8 Chase Litton QB; 65 Robert McCray OLB (IR); 34 Leon McQuay SS; 70 Pace Murphy T; 40 D'Montre Wade CB; 88 David Wells TE; Reserve: 65 Jordan Devey G (IR); 47 Step Durham CB (IR); 76 Laurent Duvernay-Tardif G (IR); 82 Alex Ellis TE (IR); 64 Dillon Gordon T (IR); 73 Tejan Koroma C (IR); 43 John David Moore FB (IR); 1 Byron Pringle WR (IR); 48 Terrance Smith ILB (IR); 13 De'Anthony Thomas WR (IR); 25 Armani Watts FS (IR); Rookies in italics 53 active, 12 reserve, 9 practice squad

== Preseason ==
=== Schedule ===
Week	Date	Opponent	Result	Record	Venue	Recap
1	August 9	Houston Texans	L 10–17	0–1	Arrowhead Stadium	Recap
2	August 17	at Atlanta Falcons	W 28–14	1–1	Mercedes-Benz Stadium	Recap
3	August 25	at Chicago Bears	L 20–27	1–2	Soldier Field	Recap
4	August 30	Green Bay Packers	W 33–21	2–2	Arrowhead Stadium	Recap

=== Game summaries ===
==== Week 1: vs. Houston Texans ====
Week 1: Houston Texans at Kansas City Chiefs – Game summary

Quarter	1	2	3	4	Total
Texans	7	7	3	0	17
Chiefs	0	7	0	3	10

at Arrowhead Stadium, Kansas City, Missouri

- Date: August 9
- Game time: 7:30 p.m. CDT
- Game weather: Hot, 86 °F (30 °C)
- Game attendance: 58,465
- Referee: Jerome Boger
- Recap, Game Book

Game information

First quarter

- HOU – Jordan Akins 6-yard pass from Brandon Weeden (Kaʻimi Fairbairn kick), 2:22. Texans 7–0. Drive: 12 plays, 68 yards, 6:34.

Second quarter

- HOU – Jordan Akins 14-yard pass from Brandon Weeden (Kaʻimi Fairbairn kick), 11:04. Texans 14–0. Drive: 6 plays, 66 yards, 3:56.
- KC – Demarcus Robinson 24-yard pass from Chad Henne (Harrison Butker kick), 1:09. Texans 14–7. Drive: 13 plays, 90 yards, 4:40.

Third quarter

- HOU – Kaʻimi Fairbairn 31-yard field goal, 7:54. Texans 17–7. Drive: 11 plays, 65 yards, 5:59.

Fourth quarter

- KC – Harrison Butker 32-yard field goal, 14:55. Texans 17–10. Drive: 12 plays, 61 yards, 7:59.

Top passers

- HOU – Brandon Weeden – 9/11, 97 yards, 2 TD
- KC – Chad Henne – 8/14, 91 yards, TD, INT

Top rushers

- HOU – Joe Webb – 4 rushes, 42 yards
- KC – Damien Williams – 5 rushes, 20 yards

Top receivers

- HOU – Troymaine Pope – 3 receptions, 47 yards
- KC – Demarcus Robinson – 3 receptions, 48 yards, TD

==== Week 2: at Atlanta Falcons ====
Week 2: Kansas City Chiefs at Atlanta Falcons – Game summary

Quarter	1	2	3	4	Total
Chiefs	0	10	7	11	28
Falcons	7	7	0	0	14

at Mercedes-Benz Stadium, Atlanta, Georgia

- Date: August 17
- Game time: 7:00 p.m. EDT/6:00 p.m. CDT
- Game weather: None (retractable roof closed)
- Game attendance: 71,628
- Referee: Walt Coleman
- Recap, Game Book

Game information

First quarter

- ATL – Austin Hooper 4-yard pass from Matt Ryan (David Martin kick), 11:20. Falcons 7–0. Drive: 7 plays, 65 yards, 3:40.

Second quarter

- KC – Harrison Butker 25-yard field goal, 13:28. Falcons 7–3. Drive: 13 plays, 73 yards, 6:54.
- ATL – Calvin Ridley 7-yard pass from Matt Schaub (David Martin kick), 5:00. Falcons 14–3. Drive: 15 plays, 75 yards, 8:28.
- KC – Tyreek Hill 69-yard pass from Patrick Mahomes (Harrison Butker kick), 0:17. Falcons 14–10. Drive: 5 plays, 92 yards, 0:55.

Third quarter

- KC – Gehrig Dieter 27-yard pass from Chad Henne (Harrison Butker kick), 9:52. Chiefs 17–14. Drive: 10 plays, 76 yards, 5:08.

Fourth quarter

- KC – Harrison Butker 49-yard field goal, 10:40. Chiefs 20–14. Drive: 10 plays, 21 yards, 5:20.
- KC – Ben Niemann 26-yard interception return (Matt McGloin–Byron Pringle pass), 9:40. Chiefs 28–14.

Top passers

- KC – Patrick Mahomes – 8/12, 138 yards, TD, INT
- ATL – Matt Ryan – 5/7, 90 yards, TD

Top rushers

- KC – Kerwynn Williams – 8 rushes, 23 yards
- ATL – Tevin Coleman – 5 rushes, 35 yards

Top receivers

- KC – Tyreek Hill – 4 receptions, 87 yards, TD
- ATL – Calvin Ridley – 3 receptions, 49 yards, TD

==== Week 3: at Chicago Bears ====
Week 3: Kansas City Chiefs at Chicago Bears – Game summary

Quarter	1	2	3	4	Total
Chiefs	7	3	0	10	20
Bears	14	10	0	3	27

at Soldier Field, Chicago, Illinois

- Date: August 25
- Game time: 12:00 p.m. CDT
- Game weather: Cloudy, 73 °F (23 °C)
- Game attendance: 60,511
- Referee: Clete Blakeman
- Recap, Game Book

Game information

First quarter

- CHI – Benny Cunningham 13-yard run (Cody Parkey kick), 12:05. Bears 7–0. Drive: 6 plays, 60 yards, 2:55.
- KC – Kareem Hunt 19-yard pass from Patrick Mahomes (Harrison Butker kick), 7:51. Tied 7–7. Drive: 6 plays, 74 yards, 4:14.
- CHI – Kevin White 29-yard pass from Chase Daniel (Cody Parkey kick), 2:13. Bears 14–7. Drive: 9 plays, 77 yards, 5:38.

Second quarter

- KC – Harrison Butker 47-yard field goal, 14:47. Bears 14–10. Drive: 7 plays, 49 yards, 2:26.
- CHI – Javon Wims 7-yard pass from Chase Daniel (Cody Parkey kick), 11:11. Bears 21–10. Drive: 7 plays, 91 yards, 3:36.
- CHI – Cody Parkey 48-yard field goal, 1:00. Bears 24–10. Drive: 8 plays, 62 yards, 3:37.

Third quarter

- No scoring plays.

Fourth quarter

- KC – Harrison Butker 29-yard field goal, 10:32. Bears 24–13. Drive: 10 plays, 24 yards, 4:11.
- CHI – Cody Parker 19-yard field goal, 3:05. Bears 27–13. Drive: 12 plays, 82 yards, 7:27.
- KC – Marcus Kemp 55-yard pass from Chase Litton (Harrison Butker kick), 2:40. Bears 27–20. Drive: 1 play, 73 yards, 0:25.

Top passers

- KC – Patrick Mahomes – 18/24, 196 yards, TD
- CHI – Chase Daniel – 15/18, 198 yards, 2 TD

Top rushers

- KC – Patrick Mahomes – 2 rushes, 11 yards
- CHI – Chase Daniel – 6 rushes, 47 yards

Top receivers

- KC – Tyreek Hill – 8 receptions, 88 yards
- CHI – Javon Wims – 4 receptions, 114 yards, TD

==== Week 4: vs. Green Bay Packers ====
Week 4: Green Bay Packers at Kansas City Chiefs – Game summary

Quarter	1	2	3	4	Total
Packers	7	14	0	0	21
Chiefs	7	10	6	10	33

at Arrowhead Stadium, Kansas City, Missouri

- Date: August 30
- Game time: 7:30 p.m. CDT
- Game weather: 77 °F (25 °C)
- Game attendance: 63,588
- Referee: Brad Allen
- Recap, Game Book

Game information

First quarter

- KC – Demetrius Harris 3-yard pass from Chad Henne (Harrison Butker kick), 9:13. Chiefs 7–0. Drive: 9 plays, 51 yards, 4:25.
- GB – Geronimo Allison 31-yard pass from DeShone Kizer (Mason Crosby kick), 4:18. Tied 7–7. Drive: 9 plays, 66 yards, 4:55.

Second quarter

- KC – Harrison Butker 35-yard field goal, 14:07. Chiefs 10–7. Drive: 11 plays, 54 yards, 5:11.
- GB – Robert Tonyan 1-yard pass from Tim Boyle (Mason Crosby kick), 7:55. Packers 14–10. Drive: 13 plays, 78 yards, 6:12.
- GB – Aaron Jones 1-yard run (Mason Crosby kick), 3:52. Packers 21–10. Drive: 5 plays, 65 yards, 2:18.
- KC – Darrel Williams 7-yard pass from Matt McGloin (Harrison Butker kick), 1:56. Packers 21–17. Drive: 4 plays, 75 yards, 1:56.

Third quarter

- KC – Harrison Butker 38-yard field goal, 11:22. Packers 21–20. Drive: 9 plays, 38 yards, 3:38.
- KC – Harrison Butker 36-yard field goal, 6:25. Chiefs 23–21. Drive: 8 plays, 55 yards, 3:16.

Fourth quarter

- KC – Harrison Butker 28-yard field goal, 14:10. Chiefs 26–21. Drive: 10 plays, 74 yards, 4:57.
- KC – Makinton Dorleant 30-yard interception return (Harrison Butker kick), 13:08. Chiefs 33–21.

Top passers

- GB – Tim Boyle – 15/31, 127 yards, TD, 2 INT
- KC – Chase Litton – 13/21, 166 yards

Top rushers

- GB – Aaron Jones – 9 rushes, 34 yards, TD
- KC – Darrel Williams – 11 rushes, 41 yards

Top receivers

- GB – Marquez Valdes-Scantling – 3 receptions, 41 yards
- KC – Byron Pringle – 4 receptions, 122 yards

== Regular season ==
=== Schedule ===
Week	Date	Opponent	Result	Record	Venue	Recap
1	September 9	at **Los Angeles Chargers**	**W** 38–28	1–0	StubHub Center	Recap
2	September 16	at Pittsburgh Steelers	**W** 42–37	2–0	Heinz Field	Recap
3	September 23	San Francisco 49ers	**W** 38–27	3–0	Arrowhead Stadium	Recap
4	October 1	at **Denver Broncos**	**W** 27–23	4–0	Broncos Stadium at Mile High	Recap
5	October 7	Jacksonville Jaguars	**W** 30–14	5–0	Arrowhead Stadium	Recap
6	October 14	at New England Patriots	**L** 40–43	5–1	Gillette Stadium	Recap
7	October 21	Cincinnati Bengals	**W** 45–10	6–1	Arrowhead Stadium	Recap
8	October 28	**Denver Broncos**	**W** 30–23	7–1	Arrowhead Stadium	Recap
9	November 4	at Cleveland Browns	**W** 37–21	8–1	FirstEnergy Stadium	Recap
10	November 11	Arizona Cardinals	**W** 26–14	9–1	Arrowhead Stadium	Recap
11	November 19	at Los Angeles Rams	**L** 51–54	9–2	Los Angeles Memorial Coliseum	Recap
12	Bye					
13	December 2	at **Oakland Raiders**	**W** 40–33	10–2	Oakland–Alameda County Coliseum	Recap
14	December 9	Baltimore Ravens	**W** 27–24 (OT)	11–2	Arrowhead Stadium	Recap
15	December 13	**Los Angeles Chargers**	**L** 28–29	11–3	Arrowhead Stadium	Recap
16	December 23	at Seattle Seahawks	**L** 31–38	11–4	CenturyLink Field	Recap
17	December 30	**Oakland Raiders**	**W** 35–3	12–4	Arrowhead Stadium	Recap

Notes

- Intra-division opponents are in **bold** text.
- The Week 11 game against the Los Angeles Rams was originally scheduled to be played in Mexico City in Estadio Azteca as a part of the league's International Series, but was moved to Los Angeles due to concerns over the playing surface.

=== Game summaries ===
==== Week 1: at Los Angeles Chargers ====
Week 1: Kansas City Chiefs at Los Angeles Chargers – Game summary

Quarter	1	2	3	4	Total
**Chiefs**	14	3	14	7	**38**
Chargers	6	6	0	16	**28**

at Stubhub Center, Carson, California

- Date: September 9
- Game time: 3:05 p.m. CDT/1:05 p.m. PDT
- Game weather: Sunny, 84 °F (29 °C)
- Game attendance: 25,351
- Referee: Clete Blakeman
- TV announcers (CBS): Ian Eagle, Dan Fouts and Evan Washburn
- Recap, Game Book

Game information

**First quarter**

- KC – Tyreek Hill 91-yard punt return (Harrison Butker kick), 13:24. Chiefs 7–0.
- LAC – Caleb Sturgis 45-yard field goal, 9:24. Chiefs 7–3. **Drive: 8 plays, 48 yards, 3:43.**
- KC – Tyreek Hill 58-yard pass from Patrick Mahomes (Harrison Butker kick), 6:50. Chiefs 14–3. **Drive: 5 plays, 75 yards, 2:41.**
- LAC – Caleb Sturgis 39-yard field goal, 0:25. Chiefs 14–6. **Drive: 6 plays, 39 yards, 3:41.**

**Second quarter**

- LAC – Austin Ekeler 13-yard pass from Philip Rivers (pass failed), 7:54. Chiefs 14–12. **Drive: 12 plays, 96 yards, 6:11.**
- KC – Harrison Butker 46-yard field goal, 2:04. Chiefs 17–12. **Drive: 11 plays, 47 yards, 5:47.**

**Third quarter**

- KC – De'Anthony Thomas 1-yard pass from Patrick Mahomes (Harrison Butker kick), 9:29. Chiefs 24–12. **Drive: 11 plays, 75 yards, 5:35.**
- KC – Anthony Sherman 36-yard pass from Patrick Mahomes (Harrison Butker kick), 0:55. Chiefs 31–12. **Drive: 6 plays, 86 yards, 3:28.**

**Fourth quarter**

- LAC – Keenan Allen 20-yard pass from Philip Rivers (Philip Rivers–Antonio Gates pass), 12:09. Chiefs 31–20. **Drive: 9 plays, 91 yards, 3:44.**
- KC – Tyreek Hill 1-yard pass from Patrick Mahomes (Harrison Butker kick), 9:47. Chiefs 38–20. **Drive: 3 plays, 2 yards, 0:40.**
- LAC – Tyrell Williams 4-yard pass from Philip Rivers (Melvin Gordon run), 5:08. Chiefs 38–28. **Drive: 10 plays, 75 yards, 4:41.**

**Top passers**

- KC – Patrick Mahomes – 15/27, 256 yards, 4 TD
- LAC – Philip Rivers – 34/51, 424 yards, 3 TD, INT

**Top rushers**

- KC – Kareem Hunt – 16 carries, 49 yards
- LAC – Melvin Gordon – 15 carries, 64 yards

**Top receivers**

- KC – Tyreek Hill – 7 receptions, 169 yards, 2 TD
- LAC – Keenan Allen – 8 receptions, 108 yards, TD

==== Week 2: at Pittsburgh Steelers ====
Week 2: Kansas City Chiefs at Pittsburgh Steelers – Game summary

Quarter	1	2	3	4	Total
**Chiefs**	21	0	14	7	**42**
Steelers	0	21	7	9	**37**

at Heinz Field, Pittsburgh, Pennsylvania

- Date: September 16
- Game time: 1:00 p.m. EDT/12:00 p.m. CDT
- Game weather: Partly cloudy, 80 °F (27 °C)
- Game attendance: 63,956
- Referee: Jerome Boger
- TV announcers (CBS): Ian Eagle, Dan Fouts and Evan Washburn
- Recap, Game Book

Game information

**First quarter**

- KC – Chris Conley 15-yard pass from Patrick Mahomes (Harrison Butker kick), 13:05. Chiefs 7–0. **Drive: 2 plays, 10 yards, 1:03.**
- KC – Travis Kelce 19-yard pass from Patrick Mahomes (Harrison Butker kick), 9:08. Chiefs 14–0. **Drive: 5 plays, 71 yards, 2:32.**
- KC – Kareem Hunt 5-yard pass from Patrick Mahomes (Harrison Butker kick), 2:24. Chiefs 21–0. **Drive: 6 plays, 61 yards, 2:40.**

**Second quarter**

- PIT – Jesse James 26-yard pass from Ben Roethlisberger (Chris Boswell kick), 14:20. Chiefs 21–7. **Drive: 6 plays, 81 yards, 3:04.**
- PIT – JuJu Smith-Schuster 2-yard pass from Ben Roethlisberger (kick failed, wide right), 6:27. Chiefs 21–13. **Drive: 11 plays, 85 yards, 5:41.**
- PIT – James Washington 14-yard pass from Ben Roethlisberger (Ben Roethlisberger–James Conner pass), 0:18. Tied 21–21. **Drive: 10 plays, 90 yards, 2:48.**

**Third quarter**

- KC – Travis Kelce 25-yard pass from Patrick Mahomes (Harrison Butker kick), 12:42. Chiefs 28–21. **Drive: 5 plays, 75 yards, 2:18.**
- PIT – James Conner 1-yard run (Chris Boswell kick), 7:12. Tied 28–28. **Drive: 11 plays, 75 yards, 3:57.**
- KC – Demarcus Robinson 3-yard pass from Patrick Mahomes (Harrison Butker kick), 3:15. Chiefs 35–28. **Drive: 7 plays, 75 yards, 3:67.**

**Fourth quarter**

- KC – Tyreek Hill 29-yard pass from Patrick Mahomes (Harrison Butker kick), 13:42. Chiefs 42–28. **Drive: 5 plays, 65 yards, 3:04.**
- PIT – Kareem Hunt tackled in end zone by Artie Burns and Morgan Burnett for a Safety, 12:02. Chiefs 42–30.
- PIT – Ben Roethlisberger 1-yard run (Chris Boswell kick), 1:59. Chiefs 42–37. **Drive: 9 plays, 66 yards, 3:04.**

**Top passers**

- KC – Patrick Mahomes – 23/28, 326 yards, 6 TD
- PIT – Ben Roethlisberger – 39/60, 452 yards, 3 TD

**Top rushers**

- KC – Kareem Hunt – 18 carries, 75 yards
- PIT – James Conner – 8 carries, 17 yards, TD

**Top receivers**

- KC – Travis Kelce – 7 receptions, 109 yards, 2 TD
- PIT – JuJu Smith-Schuster – 13 receptions, 121 yards, TD

==== Week 3: vs. San Francisco 49ers ====
Week 3: San Francisco 49ers at Kansas City Chiefs – Game summary

Quarter	1	2	3	4	Total
49ers	0	10	14	3	**27**
**Chiefs**	14	21	0	3	**38**

at Arrowhead Stadium, Kansas City, Missouri

- Date: September 23
- Game time: 12:00 p.m. CDT
- Game weather: Clear and sunny, 70 °F (21 °C)
- Game attendance: 76,023
- Referee: Tony Corrente
- TV announcers (Fox): Thom Brennaman, Chris Spielman and Peter Schrager
- Recap, Game Book

Game information

**First quarter**

- KC – Kareem Hunt 1-yard run (Harrison Butker kick), 8:24. Chiefs 7–0. **Drive: 11 plays, 57 yards, 4:55.**
- KC – Kareem Hunt 1-yard run (Harrison Butker kick), 2:20. Chiefs 14–0. **Drive: 8 plays, 84 yards, 3:26.**

**Second quarter**

- SF – Kyle Juszczyk 35-yard pass from Jimmy Garoppolo (Robbie Gould kick), 11:52. Chiefs 14–7. **Drive: 8 plays, 75 yards, 5:28.**
- KC – Chris Conley 4-yard pass from Patrick Mahomes (Harrison Butker kick), 8:54. Chiefs 21–7. **Drive: 5 plays, 75 yards, 2:58.**
- KC – Demetrius Harris 13-yard pass from Patrick Mahomes (Harrison Butker kick), 3:37. Chiefs 28–7. **Drive: 8 plays, 72 yards, 3:35.**
- KC – Sammy Watkins 12-yard pass from Patrick Mahomes (Harrison Butker kick), 0:34. Chiefs 35–7. **Drive: 9 plays, 68 yards, 1:26.**
- SF – Robbie Gould 39-yard field goal, 0:00. Chiefs 35–10. **Drive: 6 plays, 54 yards, 0:34.**

**Third quarter**

- SF – Marquise Goodwin 11-yard pass from Jimmy Garoppolo (kick failed, hit left upright), 8:59. Chiefs 35–16. **Drive: 7 plays, 87 yards, 2:37.**
- SF – Alfred Morris 3-yard run (Jimmy Garoppolo–George Kittle pass), 2:43. Chiefs 35–24. **Drive: 11 plays, 77 yards, 5:12.**

**Fourth quarter**

- KC – Harrison Butker 37-yard field goal, 13:47. Chiefs 38–24. **Drive: 9 plays, 56 yards, 3:56.**
- SF – Robbie Gould 35-yard field goal, 5:17. Chiefs 38–27. **Drive: 17 plays, 58 yards, 8:30.**

**Top passers**

- SF – Jimmy Garoppolo – 20/30, 251 yards, 2 TD
- KC – Patrick Mahomes – 24/38, 314 yards, 3 TD

**Top rushers**

- SF – Matt Breida – 10 carries, 90 yards
- KC – Kareem Hunt – 18 carries, 44 yards, 2 TD

**Top receivers**

- SF – George Kittle – 5 receptions, 79 yards
- KC – Travis Kelce – 8 receptions, 114 yards

This game was Patrick Mahomes’ home debut at Arrowhead Stadium, which also happened to be against the team Mahomes would eventually defeat in his first Super Bowl victory.

==== Week 4: at Denver Broncos ====
Week 4: Kansas City Chiefs at Denver Broncos – Game summary

Quarter	1	2	3	4	Total
**Chiefs**	3	7	3	14	**27**
Broncos	3	10	7	3	**23**

at Broncos Stadium at Mile High, Denver, Colorado

- Date: October 1
- Game time: 7:15 p.m. CDT/6:15 p.m. MDT
- Game weather: Cloudy, 65 °F (18 °C)
- Game attendance: 76,656
- Referee: Craig Wrolstad
- TV announcers (ESPN): Joe Tessitore, Jason Witten, Booger McFarland and Lisa Salters
- Recap, Game Book

Game information

**First quarter**

- DEN – Brandon McManus 42-yard field goal, 11:33. Broncos 3–0. **Drive: 7 plays, 51 yards, 3:27.**
- KC – Harrison Butker 33-yard field goal, 6:03. Tied 3–3. **Drive: 10 plays, 60 yards, 5:30.**

**Second quarter**

- KC – Patrick Mahomes 8-yard run (Harrison Butker kick), 9:33. Chiefs 10–3. **Drive: 12 plays, 89 yards, 5:39.**
- DEN – Royce Freeman 13-yard run (Brandon McManus kick), 6:37. Tied 10–10. **Drive: 5 plays, 78 yards, 2:56.**
- DEN – Brandon McManus 34-yard field goal, 0:00. Broncos 13–10. **Drive: 12 plays, 60 yards, 2:17.**

**Third quarter**

- KC – Harrison Butker 21-yard field goal, 9:32. Tied 13–13. **Drive: 12 plays, 72 yards, 5:28.**
- DEN – Phillip Lindsay 1-yard run (Brandon McManus kick), 2:05. Broncos 20–13. **Drive: 9 plays, 80 yards, 4:33.**

**Fourth quarter**

- DEN – Brandon McManus 46-yard field goal, 12:47. Broncos 23–13. **Drive: 6 plays, 48 yards, 2:43.**
- KC – Travis Kelce 2-yard pass from Patrick Mahomes (Harrison Butker kick), 6:27. Broncos 23–20. **Drive: 12 plays, 75 yards, 6:20.**
- KC – Kareem Hunt 4-yard run (Harrison Butker kick), 1:39. Chiefs 27–23. **Drive: 8 plays, 60 yards, 2:56.**

**Top passers**

- KC – Patrick Mahomes – 28/45, 304 yards, TD
- DEN – Case Keenum – 21/33, 245 yards, INT

**Top rushers**

- KC – Kareem Hunt – 19 carries, 121 yards, TD
- DEN – Phillip Lindsay – 12 carries, 69 yards, TD

**Top receivers**

- KC – Tyreek Hill – 9 receptions, 54 yards
- DEN – Emmanuel Sanders – 5 receptions, 45 yards

==== Week 5: vs. Jacksonville Jaguars ====
Week 5: Jacksonville Jaguars at Kansas City Chiefs – Game summary

Quarter	1	2	3	4	Total
Jaguars	0	0	7	7	**14**
**Chiefs**	7	13	3	7	**30**

at Arrowhead Stadium, Kansas City, Missouri

- Date: October 7
- Game time: 12:00 p.m. CDT
- Game weather: Cloudy, 58 °F (14 °C)
- Game attendance: 75,289
- Referee: Brad Allen
- TV announcers (CBS): Jim Nantz, Tony Romo and Tracy Wolfson
- Recap, Game Book

Game information

**First quarter**

- KC – Patrick Mahomes 4-yard run (Harrison Butker kick), 6:39. Chiefs 7–0. **Drive: 10 plays, 73 yards, 5:23.**

**Second quarter**

- KC – Harrison Butker 22-yard field goal, 13:33. Chiefs 10–0. **Drive: 14 plays, 82 yards, 5:51.**
- KC – Harrison Butker 42-yard field goal, 2:00. Chiefs 13–0. **Drive: 6 plays, 27 yards, 2:15.**
- KC – Chris Jones 20-yard interception return (Harrison Butker kick), 1:56. Chiefs 20–0.

**Third quarter**

- KC – Harrison Butker 38-yard field goal, 5:30. Chiefs 23–0. **Drive: 12 plays, 78 yards, 5:36.**
- JAX – T. J. Yeldon 14-yard pass from Blake Bortles (Josh Lambo kick), 3:10. Chiefs 23–7. **Drive: 6 plays, 75 yards, 2:17.**

**Fourth quarter**

- KC – Kareem Hunt 4-yard run (Harrison Butker kick), 14:54. Chiefs 30–7. **Drive: 6 plays, 79 yards, 3:13.**
- JAX – Blake Bortles 21-yard run (Josh Lambo kick), 5:46. Chiefs 30–14. **Drive: 14 plays, 58 yards, 4:02.**

**Top passers**

- JAX – Blake Bortles – 33/61, 430 yards, TD, 4 INT
- KC – Patrick Mahomes – 22/38, 313 yards, 2 INT

**Top rushers**

- JAX – T. J. Yeldon – 10 carries, 53 yards
- KC – Kareem Hunt – 22 carries, 87 yards, TD

**Top receivers**

- JAX – Donte Moncrief – 6 receptions, 76 yards
- KC – Travis Kelce – 5 receptions, 100 yards

==== Week 6: at New England Patriots ====
Week 6: Kansas City Chiefs at New England Patriots – Game summary

Quarter	1	2	3	4	Total
Chiefs	6	3	17	14	**40**
**Patriots**	10	14	3	16	**43**

at Gillette Stadium, Foxborough, Massachusetts

- Date: October 14
- Game time: 8:20 p.m. EDT/7:20 p.m. CDT
- Game weather: Cloudy, 45 °F (7 °C)
- Game attendance: 65,878
- Referee: John Hussey
- TV announcers (NBC): Al Michaels, Cris Collinsworth and Michele Tafoya
- Recap, Game Book

Game information

**First quarter**

- KC – Harrison Butker 42-yard field goal, 9:05. Chiefs 3–0. **Drive: 8 plays, 35 yards, 3:26.**
- NE – Stephen Gostkowski 48-yard field goal, 5:18. Tied 3–3. **Drive: 8 plays, 45 yards, 3:47.**
- NE – Sony Michel 4-yard run (Stephen Gostkowski kick), 4:57. Patriots 10–3. **Drive: 1 play, 4 yards, 0:04.**
- KC – Harrison Butker 43-yard field goal, 3:25. Patriots 10–6. **Drive: 5 plays, 31 yards, 1:32.**

**Second quarter**

- NE – Julian Edelman 17-yard pass from Tom Brady (Stephen Gostkowski kick), 12:52. Patriots 17–6. **Drive: 10 plays, 75 yards, 5:33.**
- KC – Harrison Butker 24–yard field goal, 6:21. Patriots 17–9. **Drive: 11 plays, 69 yards, 6:31.**
- NE – Sony Michel 1-yard run (Stephen Gostkowski kick), 1:57. Patriots 24–9. **Drive: 7 plays, 75 yards, 4:24.**

**Third quarter**

- KC – Kareem Hunt 67-yard pass from Patrick Mahomes (Harrison Butker kick), 13:27. Patriots 24–16. **Drive: 3 plays, 75 yards, 1:33.**
- NE – Stephen Gostkowski 24-yard field goal, 7:17. Patriots 27–16. **Drive: 12 plays, 65 yards, 6:10.**
- KC – Harrison Butker 30-yard field goal, 3:36. Patriots 27–19. **Drive: 9 plays, 51 yards, 3:41.**
- KC – Tyreek Hill 14-yard pass from Patrick Mahomes (Harrison Butker kick), 0:56. Patriots 27–26. **Drive: 4 plays, 29 yards, 1:27.**

**Fourth quarter**

- NE – Stephen Gostkowski 39-yard field goal, 10:22. Patriots 30–26. **Drive: 11 plays, 54 yards, 5:34.**
- KC – Tyreek Hill 1-yard pass from Patrick Mahomes (Harrison Butker kick), 8:38. Chiefs 33–30. **Drive: 3 plays, 3 yards, 1:44.**
- NE – Tom Brady 4-yard run (Stephen Gostkowski kick), 5:25. Patriots 37–33. **Drive: 7 plays, 75 yards, 3:13.**
- NE – Stephen Gostkowski 50-yard field goal, 3:15. Patriots 40–33. **Drive: 5 plays, 47 yards, 0:35.**
- KC – Tyreek Hill 75-yard pass from Patrick Mahomes (Harrison Butker kick), 3:03. Tied 40–40. **Drive: 1 play, 75 yards, 0:12.**
- NE – Stephen Gostkowski 28-yard field goal, 0:00. Patriots 43–40. **Drive: 7 plays, 65 yards, 3:03.**

**Top passers**

- KC – Patrick Mahomes – 23/36, 352 yards, 4 TD, 2 INT
- NE – Tom Brady – 24/35, 340 yards, TD

**Top rushers**

- KC – Kareem Hunt – 10 carries, 80 yards
- NE – Sony Michel – 24 carries, 106 yards, 2 TD

**Top receivers**

- KC – Tyreek Hill – 7 receptions, 142 yards, 3 TD
- NE – Rob Gronkowski – 3 receptions, 97 yards

==== Week 7: vs. Cincinnati Bengals ====
Week 7: Cincinnati Bengals at Kansas City Chiefs – Game summary

Quarter	1	2	3	4	Total
Bengals	0	7	3	0	**10**
**Chiefs**	7	17	14	7	**45**

at Arrowhead Stadium, Kansas City, Missouri

- Date: October 21
- Game time: 7:20 p.m. CDT
- Game weather: Clear, 59 °F (15 °C)
- Game attendance: 75,676
- Referee: Bill Vinovich
- TV announcers (NBC): Al Michaels, Cris Collinsworth and Michele Tafoya
- Recap, Game Book

Game information

**First quarter**

- KC – Kareem Hunt 6-yard pass from Patrick Mahomes (Harrison Butker kick), 8:08. Chiefs 7–0. **Drive: 10 plays, 95 yards, 5:18.**

**Second quarter**

- KC – Kareem Hunt 15-yard pass from Patrick Mahomes (Harrison Butker kick), 13:18. Chiefs 14–0. **Drive: 4 plays, 32 yards, 1:33.**
- CIN – C. J. Uzomah 4-yard pass from Andy Dalton (Randy Bullock kick), 7:25. Chiefs 14–7. **Drive: 11 plays, 77 yards, 5:53.**
- KC – Demetrius Harris 17-yard pass from Patrick Mahomes (Harrison Butker kick), 1:55. Chiefs 21–7. **Drive: 10 plays, 77 yards, 5:30.**
- KC – Harrison Butker 26-yard field goal, 0:08. Chiefs 24–7. **Drive: 8 plays, 72 yards, 1:05.**

**Third quarter**

- KC – Kareem Hunt 2-yard run (Harrison Butker kick), 11:19. Chiefs 31–7. **Drive: 7 plays, 75 yards, 3:41.**
- KC – Ron Parker 33-yard interception return, 11:10. Chiefs 38–7.
- CIN – Randy Bullock 33-yard field goal, 6:16. Chiefs 38–10. **Drive: 10 plays, 60 yards, 4:54.**

**Fourth quarter**

- KC – Tyreek Hill 3-yard pass from Patrick Mahomes (Harrison Butker kick), 12:50. Chiefs 45–10. **Drive: 12 plays, 82 yards, 5:09.**

**Top passers**

- CIN – Andy Dalton – 15/29, 148 yards, TD, INT
- KC – Patrick Mahomes – 28/39, 358 yards, 4 TD, INT

**Top rushers**

- CIN – Joe Mixon – 13 carries, 50 yards
- KC – Kareem Hunt – 15 carries, 86 yards, TD

**Top receivers**

- CIN – A. J. Green – 7 receptions, 117 yards
- KC – Travis Kelce – 5 receptions, 95 yards

==== Week 8: vs. Denver Broncos ====
Week 8: Denver Broncos at Kansas City Chiefs – Game summary

Quarter	1	2	3	4	Total
Broncos	7	7	0	9	**23**
**Chiefs**	3	13	14	0	**30**

at Arrowhead Stadium, Kansas City, Missouri

- Date: October 28
- Game time: 12:00 p.m. CDT
- Game weather: Clear and sunny, 56 °F (13 °C)
- Game attendance: 77,103
- Referee: Shawn Hochuli
- TV announcers (CBS): Kevin Harlan, Rich Gannon and Steve Tasker
- Recap, Game Book

Game information

**First quarter**

- DEN – Phillip Lindsay 1-yard run (Brandon McManus kick), 7:40. Broncos 7–0. **Drive: 8 plays, 81 yards, 4:17.**
- KC – Harrison Butker 24-yard field goal, 2:18. Broncos 7–3. **Drive: 11 plays, 57 yards, 5:22.**

**Second quarter**

- KC – Travis Kelce 9-yard pass from Patrick Mahomes (Harrison Butker kick), 9:31. Chiefs 10–7. **Drive: 4 plays, 55 yards, 2:10.**
- KC – Sammy Watkins 13-yard pass from Patrick Mahomes (kick failed, wide left), 0:54. Chiefs 16–7. **Drive: 8 plays, 92 yards, 4:24.**
- DEN – Tim Patrick 24-yard pass from Case Keenum (Brandon McManus kick), 0:05. Chiefs 16–14. **Drive: 5 plays, 75 yards, 0:49.**

**Third quarter**

- KC – Sammy Watkins 10-yard pass from Patrick Mahomes (Harrison Butker kick), 10:16. Chiefs 23–14. **Drive: 9 plays, 83 yards, 4:44.**
- KC – Kareem Hunt 23-yard pass from Patrick Mahomes (Harrison Butker kick), 5:12. Chiefs 30–14. **Drive: 4 plays, 32 yards, 1:53.**

**Fourth quarter**

- DEN – Jeff Heuerman 4-yard pass from Case Keenum (run failed), 14:57. Chiefs 30–20. **Drive: 12 plays, 75 yards, 5:15.**
- DEN – Brandon McManus 36-yard field goal, 1:48. Chiefs 30–23. **Drive: 10 plays, 46 yards, 2:12.**

**Top passers**

- DEN – Case Keenum – 23/34, 262 yards, 2 TD, INT
- KC – Patrick Mahomes – 24/34, 303 yards, 4 TD, INT

**Top rushers**

- DEN – Phillip Lindsay – 18 rushes, 95 yards, TD
- KC – Kareem Hunt – 16 rushes, 50 yards

**Top receivers**

- DEN – Courtland Sutton – 3 receptions, 78 yards
- KC – Sammy Watkins – 8 receptions, 107 yards, 2 TD

With this win, head coach Andy Reid eclipsed win number 200, becoming the seventh coach in NFL history to do so (with Don Shula, George Halas, Bill Belichick, Tom Landry, Curly Lambeau, & Marty Schottenheimer).

==== Week 9: at Cleveland Browns ====
Week 9: Kansas City Chiefs at Cleveland Browns – Game summary

Quarter	1	2	3	4	Total
**Chiefs**	7	14	13	3	**37**
Browns	3	12	0	6	**21**

at FirstEnergy Stadium, Cleveland, Ohio

- Date: November 4
- Game time: 1:00 p.m. EST/12:00 p.m. CST
- Game weather: Sunny, 53 °F (12 °C)
- Game attendance: 67,431
- Referee: Ronald Torbert
- TV announcers (CBS): Greg Gumbel, Trent Green, Bruce Arians and Melanie Collins
- Recap, Game Book

Game information

**First quarter**

- KC – Kareem Hunt 50-yard pass from Patrick Mahomes (Harrison Butker kick), 8:14. Chiefs 7–0. **Drive: 7 plays, 95 yards, 2:43.**
- CLE – Greg Joseph 51-yard field goal, 2:45. Chiefs 7–3. **Drive: 11 plays, 42 yards, 5:29.**

**Second quarter**

- KC – Travis Kelce 11-yard pass from Patrick Mahomes (Harrison Butker kick), 13:30. Chiefs 14–3. **Drive: 7 plays, 75 yards, 4:15.**
- CLE – Nick Chubb 3-yard run (pass failed), 6:29. Chiefs 14–9. **Drive: 12 plays, 75 yards, 7:01.**
- KC – Kareem Hunt 1-yard run (Harrison Butker kick), 2:24. Chiefs 21–9. **Drive: 6 plays, 75 yards, 4:05.**
- CLE – Duke Johnson 19-yard pass from Baker Mayfield (pass failed), 0:26. Chiefs 21–15. **Drive: 9 plays, 79 yards, 1:58.**

**Third quarter**

- KC – Travis Kelce 13-yard pass from Patrick Mahomes (Harrison Butker kick), 10:03. Chiefs 28–15. **Drive: 10 plays, 75 yards, 4:57.**
- KC – Kareem Hunt 10-yard run (kick failed, hit right upright), 7:28. Chiefs 34–15. **Drive: 2 plays, 21 yards, 0:35.**

**Fourth quarter**

- CLE – Duke Johnson 5-yard pass from Baker Mayfield (pass failed), 14:57. Chiefs 34–21. **Drive: 15 plays, 75 yards, 7:31.**

**Top passers**

- KC – Patrick Mahomes – 23/32, 375 yards, 3 TD, INT
- CLE – Baker Mayfield – 29/42, 297 yards, 2 TD, INT

**Top rushers**

- KC – Kareem Hunt – 17 carries, 91 yards, 2 TD
- CLE – Nick Chubb – 22 carries, 85 yards, TD

**Top receivers**

- KC – Travis Kelce – 7 receptions, 99 yards, 2 TD
- CLE – Duke Johnson – 9 receptions, 78 yards, 2 TD

With this win, head coach Andy Reid won his 201st regular season game, passing Marty Schottenheimer to move to 6th most regular season wins in NFL history.

==== Week 10: vs. Arizona Cardinals ====
Week 10: Arizona Cardinals at Kansas City Chiefs – Game summary

Quarter	1	2	3	4	Total
Cardinals	7	0	7	0	**14**
**Chiefs**	10	10	0	6	**26**

at Arrowhead Stadium, Kansas City, Missouri

- Date: November 11
- Game time: 12:00 p.m. CST
- Game weather: Sunny and clear, 43 °F (6 °C)
- Game attendance: 76,712
- Referee: Carl Cheffers
- TV announcers (CBS): Greg Gumbel, Trent Green, Bruce Arians and Melanie Collins
- Recap, Game Book

Game information

**First quarter**

- KC – Tyreek Hill 37-yard pass from Patrick Mahomes (Harrison Butker kick), 14:04. Chiefs 7–0. **Drive: 3 plays, 75 yards, 0:56.**
- ARI – David Johnson 9-yard pass from Josh Rosen (Phil Dawson kick), 8:03. Tied 7–7. **Drive: 12 plays, 75 yards, 6:01.**
- KC – Harrison Butker 45-yard field goal, 3:00. Chiefs 10–7. **Drive: 7 plays, 11 yards, 5:03.**

**Second quarter**

- KC – Harrison Butker 46-yard field goal, 12:29. Chiefs 13–7. **Drive: 9 plays, 54 yards, 3:58.**
- KC – Tyreek Hill 14-yard pass from Patrick Mahomes (Harrison Butker kick), 5:31. Chiefs 20–7. **Drive: 9 plays, 73 yards, 4:53.**

**Third quarter**

- ARI – David Johnson 1-yard run (Phil Dawson kick), 7:48. Chiefs 20–14. **Drive: 12 plays, 61 yards, 7:12.**

**Fourth quarter**

- KC – Spencer Ware 3-yard run (pass failed), 10:14. Chiefs 26–14. **Drive: 4 plays, 31 yards, 1:58.**

**Top passers**

- ARI – Josh Rosen – 22/39, 208 yards, TD, 2 INT
- KC – Patrick Mahomes – 21/28, 249 yards, 2 TD

**Top rushers**

- ARI – David Johnson – 21 carries, 98 yards, TD
- KC – Kareem Hunt – 16 carries, 71 yards

**Top receivers**

- ARI – David Johnson – 7 receptions, 85 yards, TD
- KC – Tyreek Hill – 7 receptions, 117 yards, 2 TD

==== Week 11: at Los Angeles Rams ====
Week 11: Kansas City Chiefs at Los Angeles Rams – Game summary

Quarter	1	2	3	4	Total
Chiefs	7	16	7	21	**51**
**Rams**	13	10	17	14	**54**

at Los Angeles Memorial Coliseum, Los Angeles, California

- Date: November 19
- Game time: 7:15 p.m. CST/5:15 p.m. PST
- Game weather: Cloudy, 65 °F (18 °C)
- Game attendance: 77,002
- Referee: Clete Blakeman
- TV announcers (ESPN): Joe Tessitore, Jason Witten, Booger McFarland and Lisa Salters
- Recap, Game Book

Game information

**First quarter**

- LAR – Brandin Cooks 7-yard pass from Jared Goff (kick failed, wide left), 12:00. Rams 6–0. **Drive: 6 plays, 75 yards, 3:00.**
- LAR – Josh Reynolds 4-yard pass from Jared Goff (Greg Zuerlein kick), 5:35. Rams 13–0. **Drive: 10 plays, 83 yards, 4:21.**
- KC – Tyreek Hill 25-yard pass from Patrick Mahomes (Harrison Butker kick), 3:25. Rams 13–7. **Drive: 4 plays, 75 yards, 2:10.**

**Second quarter**

- LAR – Greg Zuerlein 23-yard field goal, 14:54. Rams 16–7. **Drive: 9 plays, 79 yards, 3:31.**
- KC – Harrison Butker 21-yard field goal, 8:04. Rams 16–10. **Drive: 11 plays, 73 yards, 6:50.**
- KC – Kareem Hunt 21-yard pass from Patrick Mahomes (Harrison Butker kick), 6:28. Chiefs 17–16. **Drive: 1 play, 21 yards, 0:09.**
- LAR – Samson Ebukam 11-yard fumble return (Greg Zuerlein kick), 1:50. Rams 23–17.
- KC – Chris Conley 8-yard pass from Patrick Mahomes (kick failed, wide left), 0:21. Tied 23–23. **Drive: 7 plays, 69 yards, 1:37.**

**Third quarter**

- LAR – Jared Goff 7-yard run (Greg Zuerlein kick), 10:52. Rams 30–23. **Drive: 8 plays, 46 yards, 2:35.**
- KC – Travis Kelce 4-yard pass from Patrick Mahomes (Harrison Butker kick), 7:09. Tied 30–30. **Drive: 8 plays, 64 yards, 3:43.**
- LAR – Greg Zuerlein 33-yard field goal, 2:24. Rams 33–30. **Drive: 9 plays, 50 yards, 4:45.**
- LAR – Samson Ebukam 25-yard interception return (Greg Zuerlein kick), 2:14. Rams 40–30.

**Fourth quarter**

- KC – Tyreek Hill 73-yard pass from Patrick Mahomes (Harrison Butker kick), 12:04. Rams 40–37. **Drive: 3 plays, 91 yards, 1:28.**
- KC – Allen Bailey 2-yard fumble return (Harrison Butker kick), 11:07. Chiefs 44–40.
- LAR – Gerald Everett 7-yard pass from Jared Goff (Greg Zuerlein kick), 9:38. Rams 47–44. **Drive: 6 plays, 75 yards, 1:29.**
- KC – Chris Conley 10-yard pass from Patrick Mahomes (Harrison Butker kick), 2:47. Chiefs 51–47. **Drive: 8 plays, 65 yards, 3:46.**
- LAR – Gerald Everett 40-yard pass from Jared Goff (Greg Zuerlein kick), 1:49. Rams 54–51. **Drive: 6 plays, 75 yards, 0:58.**

**Top passers**

- KC – Patrick Mahomes – 33/46, 478 yards, 6 TD, 3 INT
- LAR – Jared Goff – 31/49, 413 yards, 4 TD

**Top rushers**

- KC – Kareem Hunt – 14 rushes, 70 yards
- LAR – Todd Gurley – 12 rushes, 55 yards

**Top receivers**

- KC – Tyreek Hill – 10 receptions, 215 yards, 2 TD
- LAR – Brandin Cooks – 8 receptions, 107 yards, TD

==== Week 13: at Oakland Raiders ====
Week 13: Kansas City Chiefs at Oakland Raiders – Game summary

Quarter	1	2	3	4	Total
**Chiefs**	10	9	14	7	**40**
Raiders	0	7	9	17	**33**

at Oakland–Alameda County Coliseum, Oakland, California

- Date: December 2
- Game time: 3:05 p.m. CST/1:05 p.m. PST
- Game weather: Sunny skies, 57 °F (14 °C)
- Game attendance: 54,255
- Referee: Shawn Smith
- TV announcers (CBS): Ian Eagle, Dan Fouts and Evan Washburn
- Recap, Game Book

Game information

**First quarter**

- KC – Travis Kelce 3-yard pass from Patrick Mahomes (Harrison Butker kick), 12:11. Chiefs 7–0. **Drive: 2 plays, 65 yards, 0:52.**
- KC – Harrison Butker 29-yard field goal, 7:42. Chiefs 10–0. **Drive: 8 plays, 39 yards, 3:31.**

**Second quarter**

- KC – Harrison Butker 50-yard field goal, 7:02. Chiefs 13–0. **Drive: 12 plays, 38 yards, 6:00.**
- OAK – Doug Martin 1-yard run (Daniel Carlson kick), 1:04. Chiefs 13–7. **Drive: 11 plays, 75 yards, 5:58.**
- KC – Travis Kelce 6-yard pass from Patrick Mahomes (kick blocked), 0:07. Chiefs 19–7. **Drive: 5 plays, 82 yards, 0:57.**

**Third quarter**

- OAK – Daniel Carlson 50-yard field goal, 11:06. Chiefs 19–10. **Drive: 8 plays, 43 yards, 3:54.**
- KC – Spencer Ware 1-yard run (Harrison Butker kick), 5:48. Chiefs 26–10. **Drive: 11 plays, 75 yards, 5:18.**
- OAK – Jared Cook 24-yard pass from Derek Carr (run failed), 3:28. Chiefs 26–16. **Drive: 6 plays, 68 yards, 2:20.**
- KC – Demetrius Harris 13-yard pass from Patrick Mahomes (Harrison Butker kick), 0:04. Chiefs 33–16. **Drive: 7 plays, 52 yards, 2:09.**

**Fourth quarter**

- OAK – Lee Smith 1-yard pass from Derek Carr (Daniel Carlson kick), 10:41. Chiefs 33–23. **Drive: 10 plays, 75 yards, 4:23.**
- OAK – Marcell Ateman 9-yard pass from Derek Carr (Daniel Carlson kick), 6:46. Chiefs 33–30. **Drive: 6 plays, 54 yards, 2:32.**
- KC – Chris Conley 2-yard pass from Patrick Mahomes (Harrison Butker kick), 1:54. Chiefs 40–30. **Drive: 10 plays, 75 yards, 4:52.**
- OAK – Daniel Carlson 44-yard field goal, 0:30. Chiefs 40–33. **Drive: 8 plays, 49 yards, 1:24.**

**Top passers**

- KC – Patrick Mahomes – 23/38, 295 yards, 4 TD
- OAK – Derek Carr – 29/38, 285 yards, 3 TD

**Top rushers**

- KC – Patrick Mahomes – 9 carries, 52 yards
- OAK – Jalen Richard – 6 carries, 95 yards

**Top receivers**

- KC – Travis Kelce – 12 receptions, 168 yards, 2 TD
- OAK – Jared Cook – 7 receptions, 100 yards, TD

==== Week 14: vs. Baltimore Ravens ====
Week 14: Baltimore Ravens at Kansas City Chiefs – Game summary

Quarter	1	2	3	4	OT	Total
Ravens	0	10	7	7	0	**24**
**Chiefs**	7	10	0	7	3	**27**

at Arrowhead Stadium, Kansas City, Missouri

- Date: December 9
- Game time: 12:00 p.m. CST
- Game weather: Sunny, 27 °F (−3 °C)
- Game attendance: 74,336
- Referee: Tony Corrente
- TV announcers (CBS): Jim Nantz, Tony Romo and Tracy Wolfson
- Recap, Game Book

Game information

**First quarter**

- KC – Damien Williams 1-yard rush (Harrison Butker kick), 3:03. Chiefs 7–0. **Drive: 10 plays, 75 yards, 5:41.**

**Second quarter**

- BAL – Kenneth Dixon 3-yard rush (Justin Tucker kick), 14:17. Tied 7–7. **Drive: 8 plays, 75 yards, 3:46.**
- BAL – Justin Tucker 28-yard field goal, 7:00. Ravens 10–7. **Drive: 10 plays, 49 yards, 4:37.**
- KC – Travis Kelce 15-yard pass from Patrick Mahomes (Harrison Butker kick), 2:37. Chiefs 14–10. **Drive: 9 plays, 75 yards, 4:23.**
- KC – Harrison Butker 24-yard field goal, 0:00. Chiefs 17–10. **Drive: 9 plays, 75 yards, 1:36.**

**Third quarter**

- BAL – Maxx Williams 10-yard pass from Lamar Jackson (Justin Tucker kick), 3:10. Tied 17–17. **Drive: 14 plays, 73 yards, 7:15.**

**Fourth quarter**

- BAL – John Brown 9-yard pass from Lamar Jackson (Justin Tucker kick), 4:04. Ravens 24–17. **Drive: 3 plays, 14 yards, 0:54.**
- KC – Damien Williams 5-yard pass from Patrick Mahomes (Harrison Butker kick), 0:53. Tied 24–24. **Drive: 11 plays, 75 yards, 3:11.**

**Overtime**

- KC – Harrison Butker 35-yard field goal, 4:42. Chiefs 27–24. **Drive: 11 plays, 58 yards, 5:18.**

**Top passers**

- BAL – Lamar Jackson – 13/24, 147 yards, 2 TD
- KC – Patrick Mahomes – 35/53, 377 yards, 2 TD, INT

**Top rushers**

- BAL – Lamar Jackson – 13 carries, 71 yards
- KC – Spencer Ware – 15 carries, 75 yards

**Top receivers**

- BAL – Willie Snead IV – 5 receptions, 61 yards
- KC – Tyreek Hill – 8 receptions, 139 yards

With the win, the Chiefs improved to 11–2 and swept the AFC North.

==== Week 15: vs. Los Angeles Chargers ====
Week 15: Los Angeles Chargers at Kansas City Chiefs – Game summary

Quarter	1	2	3	4	Total
**Chargers**	0	7	7	15	**29**
Chiefs	14	0	7	7	**28**

at Arrowhead Stadium, Kansas City, Missouri

- Date: December 13
- Game time: 7:20 p.m. CST
- Game weather: 39 °F (4 °C)
- Game attendance: 75,091
- Referee: Walt Anderson
- TV announcers (Fox/NFLN): Joe Buck, Troy Aikman, Erin Andrews and Kristina Pink
- Recap, Game Book

Game information

**First quarter**

- KC – Demarcus Robinson 5-yard pass from Patrick Mahomes (Harrison Butker kick), 9:09. Chiefs 7–0. **Drive: 10 plays, 49 yards, 4:58.**
- KC – Darrel Williams 11-yard pass from Patrick Mahomes (Harrison Butker kick), 0:43. Chiefs 14–0. **Drive: 10 plays, 80 yards, 4:51.**

**Second quarter**

- LAC – Mike Williams 3-yard pass from Philip Rivers (Michael Badgley kick), 9:43. Chiefs 14–7. **Drive: 10 plays, 75 yards, 6:00.**

**Third quarter**

- KC – Damien Williams 2-yard run (Michael Badgley kick), 11:38. Chiefs 21–7. **Drive: 7 plays, 74 yards, 3:22.**
- LAC – Mike Williams 19-yard rush (Michael Badgley kick), 4:57. Chiefs 21–14. **Drive: 11 plays, 76 yards, 6:41.**

**Fourth quarter**

- KC – Damien Williams 1-yard rush (Harrison Butker kick), 8:15. Chiefs 28–14. **Drive: 13 plays, 73 yards, 7:55.**
- LAC – Justin Jackson 3-yard run (Michael Badgley kick), 3:49. Chiefs 28–21. **Drive: 11 plays, 75 yards, 4:26.**
- LAC – Mike Williams 1-yard pass from Philip Rivers (Philip Rivers–Mike Williams pass), 0:04. Chargers 29–28. **Drive: 8 plays, 60 yards, 2:33.**

**Top passers**

- LAC – Philip Rivers – 26/38, 313 yards, 2 TD, 2 INT
- KC – Patrick Mahomes – 24/34, 243 yards, 2 TD

**Top rushers**

- LAC – Justin Jackson – 16 carries, 58 yards, TD
- KC – Damien Williams – 10 carries, 49 yards, 2 TD

**Top receivers**

- LAC – Mike Williams – 7 receptions, 76 yards, 2 TD
- KC – Damien Williams – 6 receptions, 74 yards

==== Week 16: at Seattle Seahawks ====
Week 16: Kansas City Chiefs at Seattle Seahawks – Game summary

Quarter	1	2	3	4	Total
Chiefs	3	7	7	14	**31**
**Seahawks**	7	7	10	14	**38**

at CenturyLink Field, Seattle, Washington

- Date: December 23
- Game time: 7:20 p.m. CST/5:20 p.m. PST
- Game weather: Cloudy, 43 °F (6 °C)
- Game attendance: 69,067
- Referee: Bill Vinovich
- TV announcers (NBC): Al Michaels, Cris Collinsworth and Michele Tafoya
- Recap, Game Book

Game information

**First quarter**

- SEA – Chris Carson 4-yard run (Sebastian Janikowski kick), 8:55. Seahawks 7–0. **Drive: 11 plays, 78 yards, 5:06.**
- KC – Harrison Butker 54-yard field goal, 6:34. Seahawks 7–3. **Drive: 8 plays, 39 yards, 2:21.**

**Second quarter**

- KC – Damien Williams 2-yard pass from Patrick Mahomes (Harrison Butker kick), 11:21. Chiefs 10–7. **Drive: 10 plays, 74 yards, 5:26.**
- SEA – Nick Vannett 1-yard pass from Russell Wilson (Sebastian Janikowski kick), 5:26. Seahawks 14–10. **Drive: 6 plays, 21 yards, 3:13.**

**Third quarter**

- SEA – Sebastian Janikowski 28-yard field goal, 9:27. Seahawks 17–10. **Drive: 12 plays, 65 yards, 5:33.**
- KC – Charcandrick West 25-yard pass from Patrick Mahomes (Harrison Butker kick), 5:18. Tied 17–17. **Drive: 7 plays, 83 yards, 4:09.**
- SEA – Doug Baldwin 27-yard pass from Russell Wilson (Sebastian Janikowski kick), 0:45. Seahawks 24–17. **Drive: 8 plays, 75 yards, 4:33.**

**Fourth quarter**

- KC – Harrison Butker 29-yard field goal, 10:28. Seahawks 24–20. **Drive: 10 plays, 60 yards, 3:45.**
- SEA – Ed Dickson 2-yard pass from Russell Wilson (Sebastian Janikowski kick), 7:31. Seahawks 31–20. **Drive: 6 plays, 70 yards, 2:57.**
- KC – Demarcus Robinson 11-yard pass from Patrick Mahomes (Patrick Mahomes run), 4:36. Seahawks 31–28. **Drive: 9 plays, 72 yards, 2:55.**
- SEA – Chris Carson 1-yard rush (Sebastian Janikowski kick), 2:29. Seahawks 38–28. **Drive: 8 plays, 75 yards, 2:07.**
- KC – Harrison Butker 32-yard field goal, 1:20. Seahawks 38–31. **Drive: 5 plays, 16 yards, 1:09.**

**Top passers**

- KC – Patrick Mahomes – 23/40, 273 yards, 3 TD
- SEA – Russell Wilson – 18/29, 271 yards, 3 TD

**Top rushers**

- KC – Damien Williams – 13 carries, 103 yards
- SEA – Chris Carson – 27 carries, 116 yards, 2 TD

**Top receivers**

- KC – Tyreek Hill – 4 receptions, 74 yards
- SEA – Doug Baldwin – 7 receptions, 126 yards, TD

==== Week 17: vs. Oakland Raiders ====
Week 17: Oakland Raiders at Kansas City Chiefs – Game summary

Quarter	1	2	3	4	Total
Raiders	0	3	0	0	**3**
**Chiefs**	14	7	7	7	**35**

at Arrowhead Stadium, Kansas City, Missouri

- Date: December 30
- Game time: 3:25 p.m. CST
- Game weather: Sunny, 45 °F (7 °C)
- Game attendance: 77,550
- Referee: Shawn Hochuli
- TV announcers (CBS): Greg Gumbel, Trent Green, Bruce Arians and Melanie Collins
- Recap, Game Book

Game information

**First quarter**

- KC – Tyreek Hill 67-yard pass from Patrick Mahomes (Harrison Butker kick), 12:41. Chiefs 7–0. **Drive: 6 plays, 84 yards, 2:19.**
- KC – Daniel Sorensen 54-yard Interception Return (Harrison Bukter kick), 5:44. Chiefs 14–0.

**Second quarter**

- KC – Damien Williams 4-yard run (Harrison Butker kick), 9:31. Chiefs 21–0. **Drive: 9 plays, 60 yards, 4:40.**
- OAK – Daniel Carlson 50-yard field goal, 1:09. Chiefs 21–3. **Drive: 13 plays, 66 yards, 4:39.**

**Third quarter**

- KC – Demarcus Robinson 89-yard pass from Patrick Mahomes (Harrison Butker kick), 8:51. Chiefs 28–3. **Drive: 5 plays, 99 yards, 1:34.**

**Fourth quarter**

- KC – Tyreek Hill 15-yard run (Harrison Butker kick), 13:25. Chiefs 35–3. **Drive: 10 plays, 92 yards, 5:36.**

**Top passers**

- OAK – Derek Carr – 24/33, 185 yards, 2 INT
- KC – Patrick Mahomes – 14/24, 281 yards, 2 TD, INT

**Top rushers**

- OAK – Doug Martin – 21 carries, 100 yards
- KC – Damien Williams – 11 carries, 51 yards, TD

**Top receivers**

- OAK – Jordy Nelson – 9 receptions, 78 yards
- KC – Tyreek Hill – 5 receptions, 101 yards, TD

With this win, head coach Andy Reid won his 206th combined regular season & post season game, passing Marty Schottenheimer to move to 7th most combined wins in NFL history.

=== Standings ===
==== Division ====
AFC West
	W	L	T	PCT	DIV	CONF	PF	PA	STK
^{(1)} Kansas City Chiefs	12	4	0	.750	5–1	10–2	565	421	W1
^{(5)} Los Angeles Chargers	12	4	0	.750	4–2	9–3	428	329	W1
Denver Broncos	6	10	0	.375	2–4	4–8	329	349	L4
Oakland Raiders	4	12	0	.250	1–5	3–9	290	467	L1

==== Conference ====
AFC
#	Team	Division	W	L	T	PCT	DIV	CONF	SOS	SOV	STK
**Division leaders**
1 (Note: Kansas City finished ahead of LA Chargers in the AFC West based on division record, claiming the No. 1 seed.)	Kansas City Chiefs	West	12	4	0	.750	5–1	10–2	.480	.401	W1
2 (Note: New England claimed the No. 2 seed over Houston based on head-to-head victory.)	New England Patriots	East	11	5	0	.688	5–1	8–4	.482	.494	W2
3	Houston Texans	South	11	5	0	.688	4–2	9–3	.471	.435	W1
4	Baltimore Ravens	North	10	6	0	.625	3–3	8–4	.496	.450	W3
**Wild Cards**
5	Los Angeles Chargers	West	12	4	0	.750	4–2	9–3	.477	.422	W1
6	Indianapolis Colts	South	10	6	0	.625	4–2	7–5	.465	.456	W4
**Did not qualify for the postseason**
7	Pittsburgh Steelers	North	9	6	1	.594	4–1–1	6–5–1	.504	.448	W1
8	Tennessee Titans	South	9	7	0	.563	3–3	5–7	.520	.465	L1
9	Cleveland Browns	North	7	8	1	.469	3–2–1	5–6–1	.516	.411	L1
10	Miami Dolphins	East	7	9	0	.438	4–2	6–6	.469	.446	L3
11 (Note: Denver finished ahead of Cincinnati and Buffalo based on strength of victory. Cincinnati finished ahead of Buffalo based on record vs. common opponents. Cincinnati's cumulative record against Baltimore, Indianapolis, the Los Angeles Chargers and Miami was 3–2, compared to Buffalo's 1–4 cumulative record against the same four teams.)	Denver Broncos	West	6	10	0	.375	2–4	4–8	.523	.464	L4
12	Cincinnati Bengals	North	6	10	0	.375	1–5	4–8	.535	.448	L2
13	Buffalo Bills	East	6	10	0	.375	2–4	4–8	.523	.411	W1
14	Jacksonville Jaguars	South	5	11	0	.313	1–5	4–8	.549	.463	L1
15 (Note: NY Jets finished ahead of Oakland based on strength of victory.)	New York Jets	East	4	12	0	.250	1–5	3–9	.506	.438	L3
16	Oakland Raiders	West	4	12	0	.250	1–5	3–9	.547	.406	L1
**Tiebreakers** (Note: When breaking ties for three or more teams under the NFL's rules, they are first broken within divisions, then comparing only the highest ranked remaining team from each division.)

== Postseason ==
=== Schedule ===
Round	Date	Opponent (seed)	Result	Record	Venue	Recap
Wild Card	First-round bye					
Divisional	January 12	Indianapolis Colts (6)	W 31–13	1–0	Arrowhead Stadium	Recap
AFC Championship	January 20	New England Patriots (2)	L 31–37 (OT)	1–1	Arrowhead Stadium	Recap

=== Game summaries ===
==== AFC Divisional Playoffs: vs. (6) Indianapolis Colts ====
AFC Divisional Playoffs: (6) Indianapolis Colts at (1) Kansas City Chiefs – Game summary

Quarter	1	2	3	4	Total
Colts	0	7	0	6	13
Chiefs	14	10	0	7	31

at Arrowhead Stadium, Kansas City, Missouri

- Date: January 12, 2019
- Game time: 3:35 p.m. CST
- Game weather: Snow, 32 °F (0 °C)
- Game attendance: 76,765
- Referee: John Hussey
- TV announcers (NBC): Al Michaels, Cris Collinsworth and Michele Tafoya
- Recap, Game Book

Game information

First quarter

- KC – Damien Williams 10-yard run (Harrison Butker kick), 10:05. Chiefs 7–0. Drive: 5 plays, 90 yards, 3:00.
- KC – Tyreek Hill 36-yard run (Harrison Butker kick), 6:28. Chiefs 14–0. Drive: 8 plays, 70 yards, 3:04.

Second quarter

- KC – Harrison Butker 39-yard field goal, 12:13. Chiefs 17–0. Drive: 15 plays, 53 yards, 6:59.
- IND – Zach Pascal blocked punt recovery in end zone (Adam Vinatieri kick), 5:56. Chiefs 17–7.
- KC – Patrick Mahomes 4-yard run (Harrison Butker kick), 1:40. Chiefs 24–7. Drive: 10 plays, 75 yards, 4:16.

Third quarter

- No scoring plays.

Fourth quarter

- IND – T. Y. Hilton 29-yard pass from Andrew Luck (kick failed, wide right), 5:31. Chiefs 24–13. Drive: 10 plays, 87 yards, 3:04.
- KC – Darrel Williams 6-yard run (Harrison Butker kick), 2:23. Chiefs 31–13. Drive: 9 plays, 61 yards, 3:08.

Top passers

- IND – Andrew Luck – 18/35, 196 yards, TD
- KC – Patrick Mahomes – 27/41, 278 yards

Top rushers

- IND – Marlon Mack – 9 rushes, 46 yards
- KC – Damien Williams – 25 rushes, 129 yards, TD

Top receivers

- IND – T. Y. Hilton – 4 receptions, 60 yards, TD
- KC – Travis Kelce – 7 receptions, 108 yards

==== AFC Championship: vs. (2) New England Patriots ====
AFC Championship: (2) New England Patriots at (1) Kansas City Chiefs – Game summary

Quarter	1	2	3	4	OT	Total
Patriots	7	7	3	14	6	37
Chiefs	0	0	7	24	0	31

at Arrowhead Stadium, Kansas City, Missouri

- Date: January 20, 2019
- Game time: 5:40 p.m. CST
- Game weather: Cloudy, 19 °F (−7 °C)
- Game attendance: 77,034
- Referee: Clete Blakeman
- TV announcers (CBS): Jim Nantz, Tony Romo, Tracy Wolfson, Evan Washburn and Jay Feely
- Recap, Gamebook

Game information

First quarter

- NE – Sony Michel 6-yard run (Stephen Gostkowski kick) 6:55. Patriots 7–0. Drive: 15 plays, 80 yards, 8:05

Second quarter

- NE – Phillip Dorsett 29-yard pass from Tom Brady (Stephen Gostowski kick), 0:27. Patriots 14–0. Drive: 8 plays, 90 yards, 2:41

Third quarter

- KC – Travis Kelce 12-yard pass from Patrick Mahomes (Harrison Butker kick), 12:56. Patriots 14–7. Drive: 4 plays, 74 yards, 2:04
- NE – Stephen Gostowski 47-yard field goal, 4:07. Patriots 17–7. Drive: 6 plays, 8 yards, 3:36.

Fourth quarter

- KC – Damien Williams 1-yard pass from Patrick Mahomes (Harrison Butker kick), 14:51. Patriots 17–14 . Drive: 9 plays, 75 yards, 4:11
- KC – Damien Williams 23-yard pass from Patrick Mahomes (Harrison Butker kick), 7:45. Chiefs 21–17. Drive: 2 plays, 23 yards, 0:10.
- NE – Sony Michel 10-yard run (Stephen Gostkowski kick), 3:32. Patriots 24–21. Drive: 10 plays, 75 yards, 4:13.
- KC – Damien Williams 2-yard run (Harrison Butker kick), 2:03. Chiefs 28–24. Drive: 5 plays, 68 yards, 1:29.
- NE – Rex Burkhead 4-yard run (Stephen Gostkowski kick), 0:39. Patriots 31–28. Drive: 6 plays, 65 yards, 1:24.
- KC – Harrison Butker 39-yard field goal, 0:11. Tied 31–31. Drive: 4 plays, 48 yards, 0:31.

Overtime

- NE – Rex Burkhead 2-yard run, 10:10. Patriots 37–31. Drive: 13 plays, 75 yards, 4:52.

Top passers

- NE – Tom Brady – 30/46, 348 yards, TD, 2 INT
- KC – Patrick Mahomes – 16/31, 295 yards, 3 TD

Top rushers

- NE – Sony Michel – 29 rushes, 113 yards, 2 TD
- KC – Damien Williams – 10 rushes, 30 yards, TD

Top receivers

- NE – Julian Edelman – 7 receptions, 96 yards
- KC – Sammy Watkins – 4 receptions, 114 yards
