= Demetrius Harris =

American football player (born 1991)

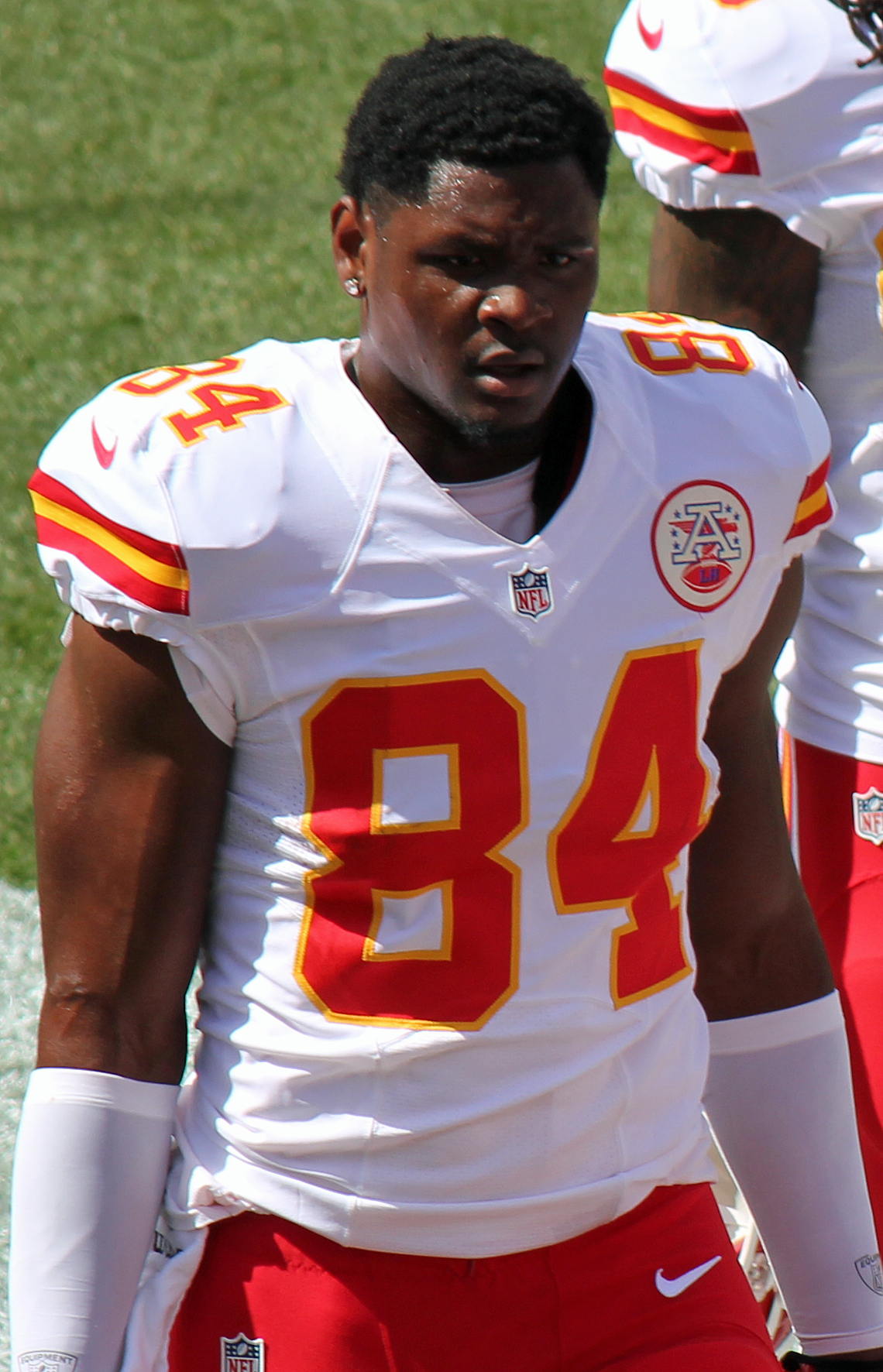
- Harris with the Kansas City Chiefs in 2014

No. 84, 88, 86
- Position: Tight end

Personal information
- Born: July 29, 1991 (age 35); Carrollton, Texas, U.S.
- Listed height: 6 ft 7 in (2.01 m)
- Listed weight: 230 lb (104 kg)

Career information
- High school: Jacksonville (Jacksonville, Arkansas)
- College: UW–Milwaukee
- NFL draft: 2013: undrafted

Career history
- Kansas City Chiefs (2013–2018); Cleveland Browns (2019); Chicago Bears (2020); Arizona Cardinals (2021)

Career NFL statistics
- Receptions: 82
- Receiving yards: 809
- Total touchdowns: 10
- Stats at Pro Football Reference

Demetrius Harris (born July 29, 1991) is an American former professional football player who was a tight end in the National Football League (NFL). He played college basketball at the University of Wisconsin–Milwaukee, which has no college football program. He was signed by the Kansas City Chiefs as an undrafted free agent in 2013.

== College career ==
After a standout high school career at Jacksonville High School in Jacksonville, Arkansas, where he made All-State in both football and basketball, Harris originally signed with Arkansas State to play football, but, after failing to qualify academically, he decided to switch to basketball instead. Attending Mineral Area College, Harris played basketball for two seasons, before transferring to Milwaukee for his final two eligible seasons.

After playing off the bench his junior year, Harris was a starter his senior year, starting in 28 of 32 games. Despite the Panthers having a lowly 8–24 record, Harris finished 9th in the Horizon League in field goal shooting (46.9%) and led the Panthers in rebounds. After the conclusion of the basketball season, even though he had not played organized football since high school, NFL scouts showed interest in Harris playing football again, citing his size (6'7", 230 lb.) as ideal for the tight end position. Among the teams that showed interest in Harris included the Kansas City Chiefs, Baltimore Ravens, and Dallas Cowboys. To show off his skills for scouts, he held a workout with the Milwaukee Panthers football club team, otherwise known as MPFC.

== Professional career ==
Pre-draft measurables
Height	Weight	Arm length	Hand span
6 ft 5 1/2 in (1.97 m)	237 lb (108 kg)	35 5/8 in (0.90 m)	10 1/4 in (0.26 m)
All values from Pro Day

=== Kansas City Chiefs ===
==== 2013–2015 seasons ====
Harris was signed by the Kansas City Chiefs after going undrafted in the 2013 NFL draft.

After spending his 2013 season on the Chiefs' practice squad, Harris made the official roster in 2014, though his rookie season was cut short by a broken foot, ending his season after eight games.

In the 2015 season, Harris caught seven passes for 74 yards as a backup tight end, mainly used for blocking. Harris caught his first NFL touchdown pass, a 15-yard reception from quarterback Alex Smith, on the final game of the regular season, against the Oakland Raiders. On January 8, 2016, Harris signed a three-year, $6.3 million contract extension.

==== 2016 season ====
In the 2016 season, on Christmas Day, against the Denver Broncos, Harris caught a one-yard touchdown pass from Dontari Poe, who became the largest player in NFL history to throw a touchdown, in the fourth quarter. He appeared in all 16 games, of which started 11, in the 2017 season. He totaled 17 receptions for 123 receiving yards and one receiving touchdown.

==== 2017 season ====
In the 2017 season opening 42–27 victory against the New England Patriots, Harris caught the first receiving touchdown of the NFL season with a seven-yard reception from quarterback Alex Smith in the first quarter. He appeared in all 16 games, of which he started seven, in the 2017 season. He totaled 18 receptions for 224 receiving yards and one receiving touchdown.

==== 2018 season ====
On May 22, 2018, Harris was suspended the first game of the 2018 season after pleading guilty to a marijuana possession misdemeanor in March 2017. He appeared in 15 games, of which he started three, in the 2018 season. He finished with 12 receptions for 164 receiving yards and three receiving touchdowns.

=== Cleveland Browns ===
On March 14, 2019, Harris signed a two-year, $6 million contract with the Cleveland Browns. He appeared in 15 games, of which he started six. He finished with 15 receptions for 149 receiving yards and three receiving touchdowns.

Harris was released by the Browns on February 17, 2020.

=== Chicago Bears ===
On February 19, 2020, Harris was signed by the Chicago Bears. He appeared in 15 games and started five in the 2020 season.

=== Arizona Cardinals ===
On August 11, 2021, Harris signed with the Arizona Cardinals. In the 2021 season, he appeared in 14 games and started four.

== NFL career statistics ==
Year	Team	Games		Receiving					Fumbles	
Year	Team	GP	GS	Rec	Yds	Avg	Lng	TD	Fum	Lost
2014	KC	8	3	3	20	6.7	10	0	0	0
2015	KC	16	9	7	74	10.6	25	1	0	0
2016	KC	16	11	17	123	7.2	13	1	1	0
2017	KC	16	7	18	224	12.4	51	1	0	0
2018	KC	15	3	12	164	13.7	35	3	0	0
2019	CLE	15	6	15	149	9.9	23	3	0	0
2020	CHI	15	5	7	45	6.4	9	0	0	0
2021	ARI	13	3	2	7	3.5	7	0	0	0
Total		114	47	81	806	8.8	51	9	1	0
