= Steven Nelson =

American football player (born 1993)

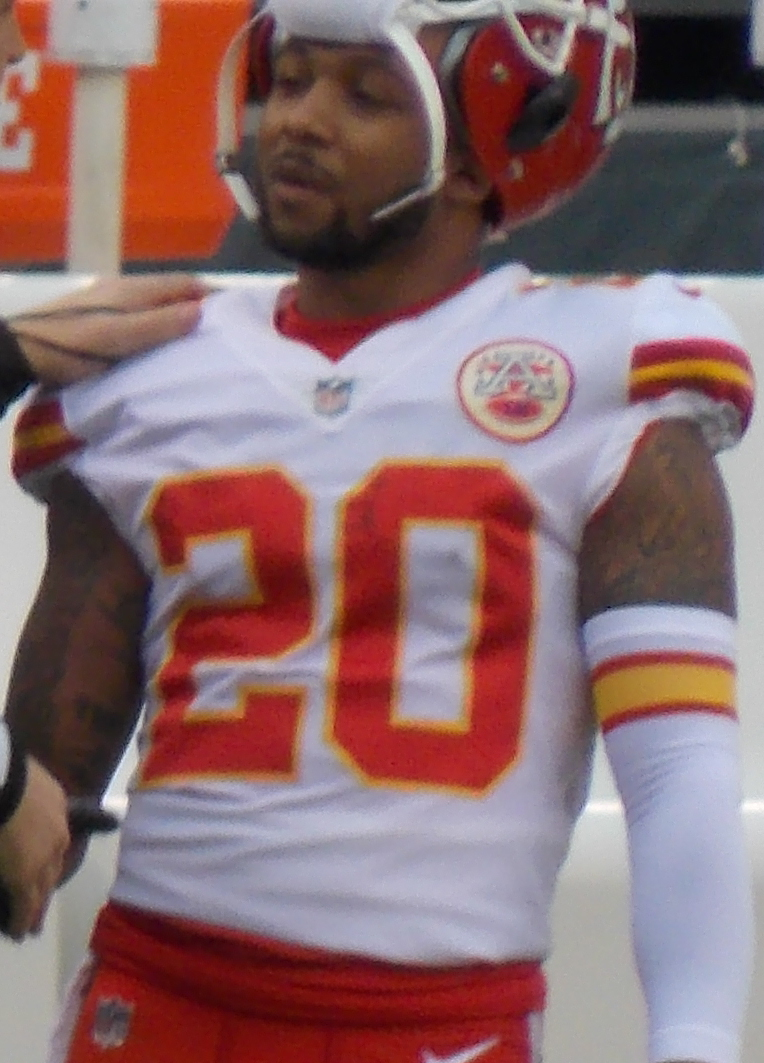
- Nelson with the Kansas City Chiefs in 2017

Profile
- Position: Cornerback

Personal information
- Born: January 22, 1993 (age 33); Warner Robins, Georgia, U.S.
- Listed height: 5 ft 11 in (1.80 m)
- Listed weight: 194 lb (88 kg)

Career information
- High school: Northside (Warner Robins)
- College: Sequoias (2011–2012); Oregon State (2013–2014)
- NFL draft: 2015: 3rd round, 98th overall pick

Career history
- Kansas City Chiefs (2015–2018); Pittsburgh Steelers (2019–2020); Philadelphia Eagles (2021); Houston Texans (2022–2023); Kansas City Chiefs (2024)*
- * Offseason or practice squad member only

Awards and highlights
- Second-team All-Pac-12 (2014)

Career NFL statistics
- Total tackles: 456
- Sacks: 1.0
- Forced fumbles: 2
- Fumble recoveries: 4
- Pass deflections: 78
- Interceptions: 13
- Stats at Pro Football Reference

Steven Nelson Jr. (born January 22, 1993) is an American professional football cornerback. He played college football for the Oregon State Beavers, and was selected in the third round of the 2015 NFL draft by the Chiefs. He has also played in the NFL for the Pittsburgh Steelers, Philadelphia Eagles, and Houston Texans.

== Early life ==
Nelson attended Northside High School in Warner Robins, Georgia. As a senior, he had seven interceptions on defense and seven punt return touchdowns. Also a track star at Northside, Nelson had a best of 11.15 seconds in the 100 meters and was part of the 4x100 relay team that finished in first place in the county.

== College career ==
Nelson attended the College of the Sequoias for two years, where he had 71 tackles and six interceptions. He was originally going to transfer to the University of Georgia but changed to Oregon State University. Nelson entered his first season at Oregon State as the nickel corner, eventually becoming a starter and starting the final nine games. For the season he had 62 tackles and six interceptions. As a senior in 2014, Nelson recorded 60 tackles and two interceptions.

== Professional career ==
=== Pre-draft ===
On November 30, 2014, it was announced that Nelson had accepted his invitation to play in the 2015 Senior Bowl. On January 24, 2015, Nelson appeared in the 2015 Senior Bowl and recorded four tackles as part of Tennessee Titans head coach Ken Whisenhunt's North team that defeated the South 34–13. Nelson attended the NFL Scouting Combine in Indianapolis and completed all of the combine and positional drills.

External videos
- Steven Nelson's NFL Combine Workout

On March 13, 2015, Nelson participated at Oregon State's pro day and chose to run the 40-yard dash (4.46s), 20-yard dash (2.57s), 10-yard dash (1.57s), and also positional and pass coverage drills. He attended pre-draft visits with the Pittsburgh Steelers and Detroit Lions and was considered one of the most underrated prospects in the upcoming draft. At the conclusion of the pre-draft process, Nelson was projected to be a third round pick by NFL draft experts and scouts. He was ranked as the 12th-best cornerback prospect in the draft by DraftScout.com and was ranked as the 13th-best cornerback by USA Today.

Pre-draft measurables
Height	Weight	Arm length	Hand span	Wingspan	40-yard dash	10-yard split	20-yard split	20-yard shuttle	Three-cone drill	Vertical jump	Broad jump	Bench press
5 ft 10 1/8 in (1.78 m)	197 lb (89 kg)	30 5/8 in (0.78 m)	9 1/4 in (0.23 m)	6 ft 0 3/4 in (1.85 m)	4.46 s	1.57 s	2.57 s	4.07 s	6.88 s	34.5 in (0.88 m)	9 ft 7 in (2.92 m)	19 reps
All values from NFL Combine/Pro Day

=== Kansas City Chiefs ===
==== 2015 ====
The Kansas City Chiefs selected Nelson in the third round (98th overall) of the 2015 NFL draft. Nelson was the 14th cornerback drafted overall and was the second cornerback drafted by the Chiefs in 2015.

External videos
- Chiefs draft Steven Nelson 98th overall

On May 15, 2015, the Chiefs signed Nelson to a four-year, $2.91 million contract that includes a signing bonus of $581,952.

Throughout training camp, Nelson competed for a backup cornerback spot against Jamell Fleming and Marcus Cooper. Head coach Andy Reid named Nelson the sixth cornerback on the Chiefs' depth chart to begin the regular season, behind Sean Smith, Phillip Gaines, Marcus Peters, Jamell Fleming, and Marcus Cooper.

Nelson was inactive as a healthy scratch for the first four regular season games of his rookie season (Weeks 1–4). On October 11, 2015, Nelson made his professional regular season debut in the Chiefs' 36–21 loss at the Cincinnati Bengals in Week 4. In Week 12, he collected a season-high three solo tackles in the Chiefs' 30–22 victory against the Buffalo Bills. Nelson finished his rookie season with eight solo tackles in 12 games, appearing primarily on special teams.

The Chiefs finished second in the AFC West with an 11–5 record and earned a playoff berth as a wildcard. On January 9, 2016, Nelson appeared in his first career playoff game and broke up a pass during a 30-0 victory at the Houston Texans in the AFC Wildcard Game. The following week, the Chiefs were eliminated from the playoffs after a 27–20 loss at the New England Patriots in the AFC Divisional Round.

==== 2016 ====
Throughout training camp, Nelson competed to be a starting cornerback after Smith departed for the Oakland Raiders in free agency. Nelson competed against Jamell Fleming, Gaines, and rookie KeiVarae Russell. Head coach Andy Reid named Nelson a starting cornerback to start the regular season, alongside Marcus Peters.

He started in the Chiefs' season-opener against the San Diego Chargers and collected a season-high nine solo tackles in their 33–27 victory. In Week 9, he recorded two combined tackles and made a season-high three pass deflections during a 19–14 victory against the Jacksonville Jaguars. Nelson was inactive for the Chiefs' Week 12 victory at the Denver Broncos due to a neck injury. He finished the season with 65 combined tackles (59 solo) and 16 pass deflections in 15 games and 15 starts.

The Chiefs finished first in the AFC West with a 12–4 record and earned a first round bye. On January 25, 2017, Nelson started his first career playoff game in the AFC Divisional Round against the Steelers and made five combined tackles as the Chiefs lost 18–16.

==== 2017 ====
Nelson entered training camp slated as a starting cornerback but saw competition for the role from Gaines. On September 3, 2017, the Chiefs placed Nelson on injured reserve/designated to return in order for him to undergo core muscle surgery. On October 30, 2017, the Chiefs activated Nelson off injured reserve for the team's Week 8 matchup against the Broncos. He returned to his starting role in Week 9 and was named the starting cornerback, along with Marcus Peters, for the remainder of the season. In Week 13, he collected a season-high nine combined tackles during a 38–31 loss at the New York Jets. He finished the 2017 season with 41 combined tackles (33 solo) and four pass deflections in nine games and seven starts. He received an overall grade of 76.8 from Pro Football Focus in 2017.

The Chiefs finished first in the AFC West with a 10–6 record, but were eliminated from the playoffs after a 22–21 upset loss to the Titans in the AFC wild card game. He finished the game with three combined tackles and a pass deflection.

==== 2018 ====
Nelson entered training camp slated as the No. 1 starting cornerback on the Chiefs' depth chart after the team traded Marcus Peters to the Los Angeles Rams. Head coach Andy Reid named Nelson and Kendall Fuller the starting cornerback tandem to begin the regular season in 2018.

He started in the Chiefs' season-opener at the Los Angeles Chargers and collected eight combined tackles and broke up a pass in their 38–28 victory. On October 7, 2018, Nelson recorded three combined tackles, deflected two passes, and made his first career interception during a 30–14 victory against the Jaguars in Week 5. He made his first career interception off a pass attempt by quarterback Blake Bortles after Bortles' pass ricocheted off the helmet of a Jaguars' offensive lineman and was caught by Nelson in the end zone with less than 12 seconds remaining in the second quarter. He started all 16 games in 2018, recording 68 combined tackles, 15 passes defensed, and four interceptions.

=== Pittsburgh Steelers ===
==== 2019 ====
On March 14, 2019, the Steelers signed Nelson to a three-year, $25.5 million contract that includes a signing bonus of $7.50 million. Head coach Mike Tomlin named Nelson and Joe Haden the starting cornerback duo to begin the regular season.

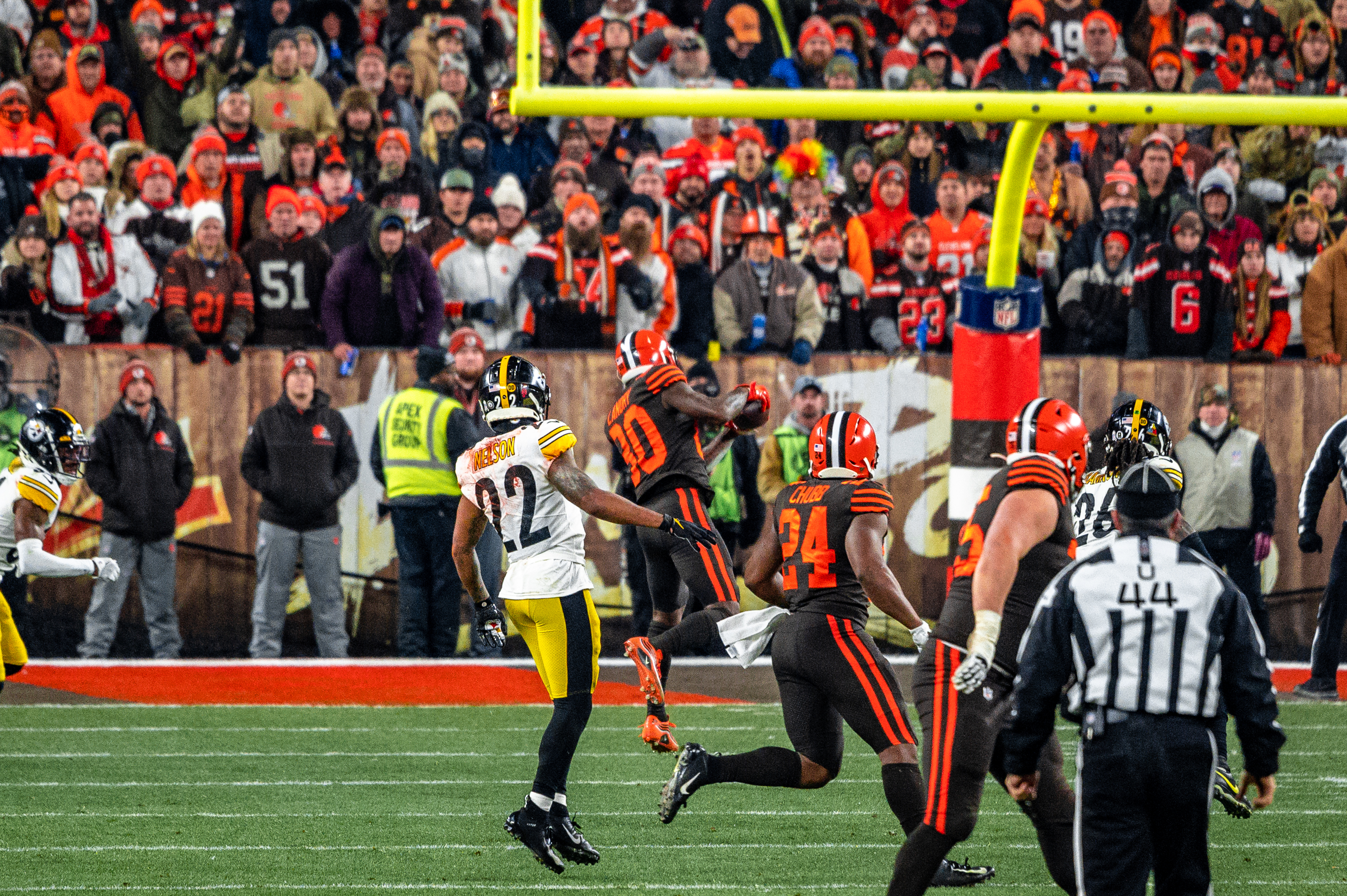
Nelson in a game against the Cleveland Browns in 2019

Nelson made his debut with the Steelers in Week 1 against the New England Patriots. In the game, Nelson made 3 tackles in the 33-3 loss. Nelson was inactive for the Steelers' Week 6 victory at the Chargers due to a groin injury. In Week 8 against the Miami Dolphins, Nelson recovered a fumble forced by teammate Mike Hilton on Mark Walton in the 27-14 win. In Week 15 against the Buffalo Bills on Sunday Night Football, Nelson intercepted a pass thrown by Josh Allen and returned it for 33 yards as the Steelers lost 17–10.

==== 2020 ====
In Week 5 against the Philadelphia Eagles, Nelson recorded his first two interceptions off of passes thrown by Carson Wentz during the 38–29 win.

On March 23, 2021, the Steelers, at Nelson's request, terminated his contract.

=== Philadelphia Eagles ===
On July 25, 2021, Nelson agreed to terms on a one-year contract with the Eagles. He started 16 games in 2021, recording 50 tackles, seven passes defensed, and one interception.

=== Houston Texans ===
On April 14, 2022, Nelson signed with the Houston Texans.

During the 2023 Wild Card game against the Cleveland Browns, Nelson intercepted a pass off of quarterback Joe Flacco, and returned it 82 yards for a touchdown in the Texans' 45–14 win.

=== Kansas City Chiefs (second stint) ===
Nelson announced his retirement from the NFL on June 9, 2024. He then came out of retirement to work out for the Kansas City Chiefs on December 9, and signed with them that day.

== NFL career statistics ==
Year	Team	Games		Tackles				Interceptions						Fumbles		
Year	Team	GP	GS	Cmb	Solo	Ast	Sck	Int	Yds	Avg	Lng	TD	PD	FF	FR	Yds
2015	KC	12	0	8	8	0	0.0	0	0	0.0	0	0	0	0	0	0
2016	KC	15	15	65	59	6	0.0	0	0	0.0	0	0	16	0	2	0
2017	KC	9	7	41	33	8	0.0	0	0	0.0	0	0	4	1	0	0
2018	KC	16	16	68	58	10	0.0	4	53	13.3	35	0	15	0	0	0
2019	PIT	15	15	61	52	9	0.0	1	33	33	33	0	8	0	1	0
2020	PIT	15	15	61	52	9	0.0	2	3	1.5	3	0	9	0	1	0
2021	PHI	16	16	50	34	16	0.0	1	4	4	4	0	7	0	0	0
2022	HOU	15	15	52	39	13	1.0	1	33	33	35	0	7	1	0	0
2023	HOU	17	16	63	48	15	0.0	4	33	8.2	33	0	12	0	0	0
Career		130	135	456	374	82	1.0	13	159	22.2	68	0	78	2	4	0
