= 2026 Kansas City Chiefs season =

57th season in the NFL, 67th season in franchise history

- Owner: The Hunt Family (Clark Hunt Chairman and CEO)
- General manager: Brett Veach
- President: Mark Donovan
- Head coach: Andy Reid
- Offensive coordinator: Eric Bieniemy
- Defensive coordinator: Steve Spagnuolo
- Home stadium: Arrowhead Stadium

Results
- Record: 8–2
- Division place: 1st AFC West

Uniform

The 2026 season is the Kansas City Chiefs' 57th in the National Football League (NFL), their 67th overall, their tenth under the leadership of general manager Brett Veach and their 14th under head coach Andy Reid. The Chiefs improved upon their 6–11 record from 2025 after a week 10 win over the Atlanta Falcons. They will seek to make the playoffs after a one-year absence, and reclaim the AFC West title.

The Chiefs started 5–0 for the second time in three seasons and were the last undefeated team in the AFC.

Because Pittsburgh Steelers' coach Mike Tomlin resigned and the Baltimore Ravens fired John Harbaugh, Andy Reid is now the longest-tenured active head coach (with one team, and with multiple consecutively) in the NFL, with his tenure starting in the 2013 season with the Chiefs.

== Offseason ==
=== Futures contracts ===
Futures contracts are signed beginning with the conclusion of the previous season. They typically consist of players who spent a portion of the previous season on the practice squad of a team.

2026 Kansas City Chiefs Futures contracts
Player	Position
Andrew Armstrong	WR
Kam Arnold	LB
Jason Brownlee	WR
Jake Haener	QB
Marcus Harris	DT
Jimmy Holiday	WR
Tanner McCalister	DB
ShunDerrick Powell	RB
Matt Waletzko	OT
Tre Watson	TE

=== Players lost ===
Below are players who were on the roster at the end of the 2025 season, but were either released or did not re-sign after their contract expired.

2026 Kansas City Chiefs Players lost
Player	Position	Reason	New team
Jaylen Watson	CB	UFA	Los Angeles Rams
Leo Chenal	LB	UFA	Washington Commanders
Bryan Cook	S	UFA	Cincinnati Bengals
Charles Omenihu	DE	UFA	Washington Commanders
Isiah Pacheco	RB	UFA	Detroit Lions
Derrick Nnadi	DT	UFA	Indianapolis Colts
Joshua Williams	CB	UFA	Tennessee Titans
Gardner Minshew	QB	UFA	Arizona Cardinals
Marquise Brown	WR	UFA	Philadelphia Eagles
Jerry Tillery	DT	UFA	Indianapolis Colts
Dameon Pierce	RB	UFA	Philadelphia Eagles
Mike Danna	DE	Released	Buffalo Bills
Jawaan Taylor	T	Released	Atlanta Falcons

=== Signings ===
2026 Kansas City Chiefs signings
Player	Position	Previous team
Kenneth Walker III	RB	Seattle Seahawks
Khyiris Tonga	DT	New England Patriots
Alohi Gilman	S	Baltimore Ravens
Emari Demercado	RB	Arizona Cardinals
Kader Kohou	CB	Miami Dolphins
Kaiir Elam	CB	Tennessee Titans
James Winchester	LS	Kansas City Chiefs
Travis Kelce	TE	Kansas City Chiefs
Tyquan Thornton	WR	Kansas City Chiefs
Jack Cochrane	LB	Kansas City Chiefs
Mike Caliendo	G	Kansas City Chiefs
L'Jarius Sneed	CB	Tennessee Titans
Mason Pline	TE	New Orleans Saints
Emmanuel Ogbah	DE	Jacksonville Jaguars
Niles King	DE	Los Angeles Chargers
Cam Jones	LB	New York Giants

=== Trades ===
Trades below only are for trades that included a player. Draft pick only trades will go in draft section.

2026 Kansas City Chiefs trades
Team	Received	Compensation
Los Angeles Rams	1st round selection 5th round selection 6th round selection 2026 NFL draft 3rd round selection 2027 NFL draft	Trent McDuffie
New York Jets	Justin Fields	6th round selection 2027 NFL draft
Atlanta Falcons	6th round selection 2027 NFL draft	Wanya Morris; 7th round selection 2027 NFL draft
New York Giants	Joshua Ezeudu	7th round selection 2028 NFL draft
Baltimore Ravens	Diego Pounds	6th round conditional selection 2028 NFL draft

=== Draft ===
2026 Kansas City Chiefs draft selections
Round	Selection	Player	Position	College	Notes
1	6	Mansoor Delane	CB	LSU	From Browns (Note: The Chiefs traded picks 9, 74 and 148 to the Cleveland Browns in exchange for a pick 6.)
1	9	Traded to the Cleveland Browns			
1	29	Peter Woods	DT	Clemson	From Rams (Note: The Chiefs traded Trent McDuffie to the Los Angeles Rams in exchange for picks 29, 169, 210, and a 2027 third-round selection.)
2	40	R Mason Thomas	DE	Oklahoma	
3	74	Traded to the Cleveland Browns			
4	109	Jadon Canady	S	Oregon	
4	125	Traded to the New England Patriots (Note: The Chiefs traded a fourth-round selection (125th overall) and a 2025 third-round selection to the New England Patriots in exchange for a 2025 third-round selection.)			From Bears (Note: The Chiefs traded Joe Thuney to the Chicago Bears in exchange for a fourth-round selection (125th overall).)
5	148	Traded to the Cleveland Browns			
5	161	Emmett Johnson	RB	Nebraska	From Steelers (Note: The Chiefs traded picks 169 and 210 to the Pittsburgh Steelers in exchange for picks 161 and 249.)
5	169	Traded to the Pittsburgh Steelers			From Rams
5	176	Cyrus Allen	WR	Cincinnati	Compensatory selection
6	191	Traded to the New England Patriots (Note: The Chiefs traded a sixth-round selection (191st overall) to the New England Patriots in exchange for Josh Uche.)			
6	210	Traded to the Pittsburgh Steelers			From Rams
7	225	Traded to the Dallas Cowboys (Note: The Chiefs traded a conditional seventh-round selection (225th overall) to the Dallas Cowboys in exchange for Peyton Hendershot.)			
7	249	Garrett Nussmeier	QB	LSU	From Steelers

2026 Kansas City Chiefs undrafted free agents
Name	Position	College	Ref.
Jaydn Ott	RB	Oklahoma	
Pete Nygra	C	Louisville	
Xavier Nwankpa	S	Iowa	
John Michael Gyllenborg	TE	Wyoming	
Josh Thompson	IOL	LSU	
Bryce Phillips	DB	San Diego State	
Wesley Bissainthe	LB	Miami (FL)	
Vincent Anthony Jr.	EDGE	Duke	
Jeff Caldwell	WR	Cincinnati	
Cole Brevard	DT	Texas	
Jacob De Jesus	WR	California	
Anthony Dunn	EDGE	Toledo	
Omari Evans	WR	Washington	
Ethan Hurkett	EDGE	Iowa	
Amari McNeill	DT	Colorado	
Damon Payne	DT	Michigan	
D'Arco Perkins-McAllister	CB	UL Monroe	
DeShon Singleton	S	Nebraska	
EJ Smith	RB	Texas A&M	
Zelmar Vedder	CB	Houston	
Kahlil Benson	OT	Indiana	
Xavier Loyd	WR	Missouri	
Marlen Sewell	DB	Vanderbilt	
Jeff Weimer	WR	West Virginia	

Draft trades

== Staff ==
Kansas City Chiefs staff
Front office: Chairman/CEO – Clark Hunt; President – Mark Donovan; General manager – Brett Veach; Assistant general manager – Chris Shea; Assistant general manager – Mike Bradway; VP of player personnel – Tim Terry; VP of player personnel – Ryne Nutt; Senior personnel executive – Willie Davis; Co-directors of college scouting – Pat Sperduto and David Hinson; Senior college and pro scouting executive – Dru Grigson; Assistant director of football administration amd roster strategy – Jack Wolov; Senior national scouting executive – Terry Delp; Player personnel executive – Jalen Myrick; Senior Football Strategy and Compliance executive – Ryan Herman; Head coaches: Head coach – Andy Reid; Assistant head coach/special teams coordinator – Dave Toub; Offensive coaches: Offensive coordinator – Eric Bieniemy; Pass game coordinator – Joe Bleymaier; Quarterbacks – David Girardi; Assistant quarterbacks – Dan Williams; Running backs – DeMarco Murray; Wide receivers – Chad O'Shea; Tight ends – Tom Melvin; Offensive line – Andy Heck; Assistant offensive line – Corey Matthaei; Offensive quality control – Nate Pagan	Defensive coaches: Defensive coordinator – Steve Spagnuolo; Defensive line – Joe Cullen; Assistant defensive line – Terry Bradden Jr.; Linebackers – Brendan Daly; Outside linebackers – Matt House; Defensive backs – Dave Merritt; Safeties – Andre Curtis; Defensive quality control – Chris Orr; Defensive quality control – C.J. Cox; Special teams coaches: Assistant special teams – Porter Ellett; Coaching support staff: Director of football research and development – Mark Richards; Statistical analysis coordinator – Mike Frazier; Strength and conditioning: Vice President of sports medicine and performance – Rick Burkholder; Head strength and conditioning/director of sports science – Ryan Reynolds; Assistant strength and conditioning – Greg Carbin; Assistant strength and conditioning – Nick Cassetta; Assistant strength and conditioning – Spencer Reid; → Coaching staff → Front office → More NFL staffs

== Current roster ==
Kansas City Chiefs roster
Quarterbacks (QB): 6 Justin Fields; 15 Patrick Mahomes; 19 Garrett Nussmeier; Running backs (RB): 10 Emmett Johnson; 34 Jaydn Ott; 47 Ben VanSumeren FB; 9 Kenneth Walker III; Wide receivers (WR): 13 Cyrus Allen; 85 Andrew Armstrong; 12 Josh Downs; 4 Rashee Rice; 11 Jalen Royals; 1 Xavier Worthy; Tight ends (TE): 88 Jake Briningstool; 83 Noah Gray; 87 Travis Kelce	Offensive linemen (OL): 70 Kahlil Benson T; 66 Mike Caliendo G; 73 Joshua Ezeudu T; 52 Creed Humphrey C; 77 Jaylon Moore T; 64 Hunter Nourzad C; 61 Diego Pounds T; 65 Trey Smith G; 76 Kingsley Suamataia G; Defensive linemen (DL): 91 Felix Anudike-Uzomah DE; 94 Bryson Eason DT; 97 Ashton Gillotte DE; 96 Marcus Harris DT; 95 Chris Jones DT; 56 George Karlaftis DE; 55 Omarr Norman-Lott DT; 51 R Mason Thomas DE; 92 Khyiris Tonga NT; 99 Peter Woods	Linebackers (LB): 31 Jeffrey Bassa; 32 Nick Bolton; 43 Jack Cochrane; 44 Cooper McDonald; 23 Drue Tranquill; Defensive backs (DB): 22 Jadon Canady CB; 27 Chamarri Conner S; 5 Mansoor Delane CB; 8 Kristian Fulton CB; 17 Alohi Gilman S; 21 Jaden Hicks S; 29 Xavier Nwankpa S; 30 Christian Roland-Wallace CB; 39 Melvin Smith CB; 20 Nohl Williams CB; Special teams (ST): 14 Matt Araiza P; 7 Harrison Butker K; 41 James Winchester LS	Practice squad: 35 Nate Carter RB; 75 Ethan Driskell T; 80 Omari Evans WR; 59 Aiden Fisher LB; –– John FitzPatrick TE; 49 Michael Heldman DE; 50 Pete Nygra C; 81 Thomas Odukoya TE (IPP); 90 Emmanuel Ogbah DE; –– Fred Johnson T; 46 D'Arco Perkins-McAllister CB; 54 Jack Pyburn LB; 25 DeShon Singleton S; –– E. J. Smith RB; 57 Tyreke Smith DE; 42 Justin Tucker K; 84 Justin Watson WR; Reserve: 8 Jeff Caldwell WR (IR); 40 Ethan Downs LB (IR); 84 John Michael Gyllenborg TE (IR); 82 Jimmy Holiday WR (IR); 71 Josh Simmons T (IR); 24 Brashard Smith RB (IR); 38 L'Jarius Sneed CB (IR); 2 Tyquan Thornton WR (IR); 73 Matt Waletzko T (IR); 89 Jared Wiley TE (IR) 53 active, 16 practice squad (1 IPP), 10 reserve As of November 18, 2026. Rookies in italics.; Roster; Depth chart; Transactions

== Preseason ==
Week	Date	Opponent	Result	Record	Venue	Recap
1	August 15	Los Angeles Rams	L 12–20	0–1	Arrowhead Stadium	Recap
2	August 22	at Tampa Bay Buccaneers	L 15–16	0–2	Raymond James Stadium	Recap
3	August 28	Seattle Seahawks	T 9–9	0–2–1	Arrowhead Stadium	Recap

== Regular season ==
=== Schedule ===
Week	Date	Time (CT)	Opponent	Result	Record	Venue	TV	Recap
1	September 14	7:15 p.m.	**Denver Broncos**	**W** 31–10	1–0	Arrowhead Stadium	ESPN/ABC	Recap
2	September 20	7:20 p.m.	Indianapolis Colts	**W** 33–30 (OT)	2–0	Arrowhead Stadium	NBC	Recap
3	September 27	12:00 p.m.	at Miami Dolphins	**W** 24–10	3–0	Hard Rock Stadium	CBS	Recap
4	October 4	3:25 p.m.	at **Las Vegas Raiders**	**W** 30–27	4–0	Allegiant Stadium	CBS	Recap
5	Bye							
6	October 18	3:25 p.m.	**Los Angeles Chargers**	**W** 22–6	5–0	Arrowhead Stadium	CBS	Recap
7	October 25	7:20 p.m.	at Seattle Seahawks	**L** 3–20	5–1	Lumen Field	NBC	Recap
8	November 1	3:25 p.m.	at **Denver Broncos**	**L** 24–28	5–2	Empower Field at Mile High	CBS	Recap
9	November 8	12:00 p.m.	New York Jets	**W** 35–12	6–2	Arrowhead Stadium	CBS	Recap
10	November 15	12:00 p.m.	at Atlanta Falcons	**W** 35–13	7–2	Mercedes-Benz Stadium	CBS	Recap
11	November 22	12:00 p.m.	Arizona Cardinals	**W** 34–7	8–2	Arrowhead Stadium	CBS	Recap
12	November 26	7:20 p.m.	at Buffalo Bills			Highmark Stadium	NBC	
13	December 3	7:15 p.m.	at Los Angeles Rams			SoFi Stadium	Prime Video	
14	December 13	3:25 p.m.	at Cincinnati Bengals			Paycor Stadium	Fox	
15	December 21	7:15 p.m.	New England Patriots			Arrowhead Stadium	ESPN/ABC	
16	December 27	3:25 p.m.	San Francisco 49ers			Arrowhead Stadium	CBS	
17	January 2/3	TBD	at **Los Angeles Chargers**			SoFi Stadium	TBD	
18	January 9/10	TBD	**Las Vegas Raiders**			Arrowhead Stadium	TBD	

Notes

- Intra-division opponents are in **bold** text.
- Networks, dates and times from Weeks 14–16 are subject to change as a result of flexible scheduling.
- The date, time and network for Week 17 will be finalized by no later than the end of Week 15.
- The date, time and network for Week 18 will be finalized at the end of Week 17.

=== Game summaries ===
==== Week 1: vs. Denver Broncos ====
Week 1: Denver Broncos at Kansas City Chiefs – Game summary

Quarter	1	2	3	4	Total
Broncos	7	0	3	0	**10**
**Chiefs**	7	7	10	7	**31**

at Arrowhead Stadium, Kansas City, Missouri

- Date: September 14
- Game time: 7:15 p.m. CDT
- Game weather: Fair, 91 °F (33 °C)
- Game attendance: 73,543
- Referee: Clay Martin
- TV announcers (ESPN/ABC): Joe Buck, Troy Aikman, Lisa Salters, and Laura Rutledge
- Recap, Game Book

Game information

**First quarter**

- KC – Patrick Mahomes 15-yard run (Harrison Butker kick), 8:11. Chiefs 7–0. **Drive: 10 plays, 46 yards, 5:19.**
- DEN – Evan Engram 19-yard pass from Bo Nix (Wil Lutz kick), 3:48. Tied 7–7. **Drive: 7 plays, 68 yards, 4:23.**

**Second quarter**

- KC – Rashee Rice 13-yard pass from Patrick Mahomes (Harrison Butker kick), 1:39. Chiefs 14–7. **Drive: 10 plays, 80 yards, 3:02.**

**Third quarter**

- KC – Kenneth Walker III 60-yard run (Harrison Butker kick), 12:43. Chiefs 21–7. **Drive: 4 plays, 69 yards, 2:17.**
- DEN – Wil Lutz 31-yard field goal, 7:34. Chiefs 21–10. **Drive: 4 plays, -8 yards, 2:00.**
- KC – Harrison Butker 28-yard field goal, 3:17. Chiefs 24–10. **Drive: 7 plays, 58 yards, 4:17.**

**Fourth quarter**

- KC – Kenneth Walker III 1-yard pass from Patrick Mahomes (Harrison Butker kick), 14:39. Chiefs 31–10. **Drive: 4 plays, 34 yards, 0:48.**

**Top passers**

- DEN – Bo Nix – 17/28, 131 yards, TD, INT
- KC – Patrick Mahomes – 15/27, 184 yards, 2 TD, INT

**Top rushers**

- DEN – J. K. Dobbins – 8 rushes, 36 yards
- KC – Kenneth Walker III – 23 rushes, 173 yards, TD

**Top receivers**

- DEN – Evan Engram – 4 receptions, 43 yards, TD
- KC – Travis Kelce – 3 receptions, 71 yards

With the dominant win, the Chiefs secured their first win since Week 12 of 2025, snapping a six-game losing streak from the previous season. This was also their first win against Denver since Week 10 of 2024, snapping a three-game losing streak.

==== Week 2: vs. Indianapolis Colts ====
Week 2: Indianapolis Colts at Kansas City Chiefs – Game summary

Quarter	1	2	3	4	OT	Total
Colts	7	13	0	7	3	**30**
**Chiefs**	10	7	7	3	6	**33**

at Arrowhead Stadium, Kansas City, Missouri

- Date: September 20
- Game time: 7:20 p.m. CDT
- Game weather: Cloudy, 71 °F (22 °C)
- Game attendance: 73,351
- Referee: Craig Wrolstad
- TV announcers (NBC): Mike Tirico, Cris Collinsworth and Melissa Stark
- Recap, Game Book

Game information

**First quarter**

- IND – Tyler Warren 1-yard pass from Daniel Jones (Spencer Shrader kick), 8:25. Colts 7–0. **Drive: 11 plays, 65 yards, 6:35.**
- KC – Harrison Butker 46-yard field goal, 6:09. Colts 7–3. **Drive: 6 plays, 36 yards, 2:16.**
- KC – Travis Kelce 13-yard pass from Patrick Mahomes (Harrison Butker kick), 4:34. Chiefs 10–7. **Drive: 2 plays, 16 yards, 0:44.**

**Second quarter**

- IND – Spencer Shrader 42-yard field goal, 14:48. Tied 10–10. **Drive: 11 plays, 34 yards, 4:46.**
- IND – Spencer Shrader 49-yard field goal, 9:49. Colts 13–10. **Drive: 6 plays, 28 yards, 2:58.**
- KC – Xavier Worthy 1-yard pass from Patrick Mahomes (Harrison Butker kick), 2:25. Chiefs 17–13. **Drive: 12 plays, 70 yards, 7:19.**
- IND – Jonathan Taylor 24-yard run (Spencer Shrader kick), 0:59. Colts 20–17. **Drive: 6 plays, 72 yards, 1:26.**

**Third quarter**

- KC – Jalen Royals 1-yard pass from Patrick Mahomes (Harrison Butker kick), 8:01. Chiefs 24–20. **Drive: 14 plays, 80 yards, 6:59.**

**Fourth quarter**

- KC – Harrison Butker 28-yard field goal, 14:15. Chiefs 27–20. **Drive: 13 plays, 81 yards, 6:24.**
- IND – Jonathan Taylor 5-yard run (Spencer Shrader kick), 5:37. Tied 27–27. **Drive: 13 plays, 64 yards, 8:38.**

**Overtime**

- KC – Harrison Butker 31-yard field goal, 5:09. Chiefs 30–27. **Drive: 11 plays, 55 yards, 4:51.**
- IND – Spencer Shrader 38-yard field goal, 3:11. Tied 30–30. **Drive: 5 plays, 45 yards, 1:58.**
- KC – Harrison Butker 40-yard field goal, 0:00. Chiefs 33–30. **Drive: 7 plays, 46 yards, 3:11.**

**Top passers**

- IND – Daniel Jones – 22/31, 210 yards, TD, INT
- KC – Patrick Mahomes – 32/47, 382 yards, 3 TD

**Top rushers**

- IND – Jonathan Taylor – 24 rushes, 92 yards, 2 TD
- KC – Kenneth Walker III – 24 rushes, 117 yards

**Top receivers**

- IND – Josh Downs – 7 receptions, 72 yards
- KC – Travis Kelce – 9 receptions, 101 yards, TD

==== Week 3: at Miami Dolphins ====
Week 3: Kansas City Chiefs at Miami Dolphins – Game summary

Quarter	1	2	3	4	Total
**Chiefs**	7	7	0	10	**24**
Dolphins	7	0	3	0	**10**

at Hard Rock Stadium, Miami Gardens, Florida

- Date: September 27
- Game time: 1:00 p.m. EDT/12:00 p.m. CDT
- Game weather: Partly cloudy, 86 °F (30 °C)
- Game attendance: 59,216
- Referee: Alex Moore
- TV announcers (CBS): Kevin Harlan, Trent Green and Melanie Collins
- Recap, Game Book

Game information

**First quarter**

- KC – Kenneth Walker III 10-yard run (Harrison Butker kick), 12:54. Chiefs 7–0. **Drive: 4 plays, 67 yards, 2:06.**
- MIA – Ollie Gordon II 3-yard run (Riley Patterson kick), 3:27. Tied 7–7. **Drive: 17 plays, 91 yards, 9:27.**

**Second quarter**

- KC – Kenneth Walker III 5-yard pass from Patrick Mahomes (Harrison Butker kick), 12:58. Chiefs 14–7. **Drive: 10 plays, 65 yards, 5:29.**

**Third quarter**

- MIA – Riley Patterson 37-yard field goal, 10:10. Chiefs 14–10. **Drive: 9 plays, 56 yards, 4:50.**

**Fourth quarter**

- KC – Harrison Butker 34-yard field goal, 11:35. Chiefs 17–10. **Drive: 13 plays, 80 yards, 6:36.**
- KC – Travis Kelce 11-yard pass from Patrick Mahomes (Harrison Butker kick), 2:55. Chiefs 24–10. **Drive: 5 plays, 47 yards, 3:01.**

**Top passers**

- KC – Patrick Mahomes – 20/24, 246 yards, 2 TD, INT
- MIA – Malik Willis – 20/36, 210 yards, INT

**Top rushers**

- KC – Kenneth Walker III – 18 rushes, 70 yards, TD
- MIA – Malik Willis – 9 rushes, 56 yards

**Top receivers**

- KC – Rashee Rice – 7 receptions, 88 yards
- MIA – Chris Bell – 4 receptions, 67 yards

==== Week 4: at Las Vegas Raiders ====
Week 4: Kansas City Chiefs at Las Vegas Raiders – Game summary

Quarter	1	2	3	4	Total
**Chiefs**	7	3	0	20	**30**
Raiders	7	6	0	14	**27**

at Allegiant Stadium, Paradise, Nevada

- Date: October 4
- Game time: 3:25 p.m. CDT/1:25 p.m. PDT
- Game weather: None (indoor stadium)
- Game attendance: 62,593
- Referee: Brad Rogers
- TV announcers (CBS): Jim Nantz, J.J. Watt, Tracy Wolfson
- Recap, Game Book

Game information

**First quarter**

- LV – Ian Thomas 27-yard pass from Kirk Cousins (Matt Gay kick), 8:10. Raiders 7–0. **Drive: 4 plays, 50 yards, 2:16.**
- KC – Tyquan Thornton 2-yard pass from Patrick Mahomes (Harrison Butker kick), 2:23. Tied 7–7. **Drive: 10 plays, 69 yards, 5:47.**

**Second quarter**

- LV – Matt Gay 32-yard field goal, 3:19. Raiders 10–7. **Drive: 15 plays, 75 yards, 8:00.**
- KC – Harrison Butker 28-yard field goal, 1:22. Tied 10–10. **Drive: 10 plays, 70 yards, 1:57.**
- LV – Matt Gay 48-yard field goal, 0:00. Raiders 13–10. **Drive: 8 plays, 41 yards, 1:22.**

**Third quarter**

- No scoring plays

**Fourth quarter**

- KC – Tyquan Thornton 8-yard pass from Patrick Mahomes (Harrison Butker kick), 14:50. Chiefs 17–13. **Drive: 3 plays, 84 yards, 0:40.**
- LV – Matt Gay 44-yard field goal, 11:12. Chiefs 17–16. **Drive: 7 plays, 19 yards, 3:38.**
- LV – Matt Gay 48-yard field goal, 4:53. Raiders 19–17. **Drive: 8 plays, 60 yards, 4:43.**
- KC – Kenneth Walker III 2-yard run (pass failed), 3:21. Chiefs 23–19. **Drive: 4 plays, 65 yards, 1:32.**
- KC – Kenneth Walker III 22-yard run (Harrison Butker kick), 3:02. Chiefs 30–19. **Drive: 1 play, 22 yards, 0:08.**
- LV – Brock Bowers 20-yard pass from Kirk Cousins (Kirk Cousins–Cody White pass), 1:46. Chiefs 30–27. **Drive: 5 plays, 65 yards, 1:16.**

**Top passers**

- KC – Patrick Mahomes – 15/30, 225 yards, 2 TD
- LV – Kirk Cousins – 31/52, 365 yards, 2 TD, INT

**Top rushers**

- KC – Kenneth Walker III – 22 rushes, 177 yards, 2 TD
- LV – Ashton Jeanty – 15 rushes, 58 yards

**Top receivers**

- KC – Tyquan Thornton – 5 receptions, 111 yards, 2 TD
- LV – Brock Bowers – 6 receptions, 86 yards, TD

==== Week 6: vs. Los Angeles Chargers ====
Week 6: Los Angeles Chargers at Kansas City Chiefs – Game summary

Quarter	1	2	3	4	Total
Chargers	3	0	3	0	**6**
**Chiefs**	9	10	0	3	**22**

at Arrowhead Stadium, Kansas City, Missouri

- Date: October 18
- Game time: 3:25 p.m. CDT
- Game weather: Sunny, 68 °F (20 °C)
- Game attendance: 73,640
- Referee: Alan Eck
- TV announcers (CBS): Kevin Harlan, Trent Green, and Melanie Collins
- Recap, Game Book

Game information

**First quarter**

- KC – Harrison Butker 44-yard field goal, 11:20. Chiefs 3–0. **Drive: 7 plays, 41, yards, 3:40.**
- KC – Kenneth Walker III 33-yard run (kick failed), 7:21. Chiefs 9–0. **Drive: 6 plays, 67 yards, 3:07.**
- LAC – Cameron Dicker 23-yard field goal, 1:33. Chiefs 9–3. **Drive: 11 plays, 60 yards, 5:48.**

**Second quarter**

- KC – Kenneth Walker III 2–yard run (Harrison Butker kick), 1:49. Chiefs 16–3. **Drive: 8 plays, 80 yards, 3:40.**
- KC – Harrison Butker 50-yard field goal, 0:20. Chiefs 19–3. **Drive: 3 plays, 38 yards, 0:23.**

**Third quarter**

- LAC – Cameron Dicker 30-yard field goal, 10:44. Chiefs 19–6. **Drive: 9 plays, 60 yards, 4:16.**

**Fourth quarter**

- KC – Harrison Butker 30-yard field goal, 3:52. Chiefs 22–6. **Drive: 11 plays, 50 yards, 3:52.**

**Top passers**

- LAC – Justin Herbert – 22/37, 204 yards, INT
- KC – Patrick Mahomes – 23/30, 272 yards, INT

**Top rushers**

- LAC – Justin Herbert – 5 rushes, 26 yards
- KC – Kenneth Walker III – 19 rushes, 128 yards, 2 TD

**Top receivers**

- LAC – Quentin Johnston – 1 reception, 57 yards
- KC – Xavier Worthy – 7 receptions, 73 yards

==== Week 7: at Seattle Seahawks ====
Week 7: Kansas City Chiefs at Seattle Seahawks – Game summary

Quarter	1	2	3	4	Total
Chiefs	0	0	3	0	**3**
**Seahawks**	0	10	3	7	**20**

at Lumen Field, Seattle, Washington

- Date: October 25
- Game time: 7:20 p.m. CDT/5:20 p.m. PDT
- Game weather: Cloudy, 55 °F (13 °C)
- Game attendance: 68,740
- Referee: John Hussey
- TV announcers (NBC): Mike Tirico, Cris Collinsworth and Melissa Stark
- Recap, Game Book

Game information

**First quarter**

- No scoring plays

**Second quarter**

- SEA – Jason Myers 25-yard field goal, 8:22. Seahawks 3–0. **Drive: 15 plays, 86 yards, 8:26.**
- SEA – Jaxon Smith-Njigba 28-yard pass from Sam Darnold (Jason Myers kick), 1:44. Seahawks 10–0. **Drive: 10 plays, 66 yards, 4:16.**

**Third quarter**

- SEA – Jason Myers 35-yard field goal, 8:09. Seahawks 13–0. **Drive: 13 plays, 57 yards, 6:51.**
- KC – Harrison Butker 50-yard field goal, 1:42. Seahawks 13–3. **Drive: 13 plays, 44 yards, 6:27.**

**Fourth quarter**

- SEA – Emanuel Wilson 21-yard run (Jason Myers kick), 3:47. Seahawks 20–3. **Drive: 9 plays, 65 yards, 4:46.**

**Top passers**

- KC – Patrick Mahomes – 19/33, 165 yards, INT
- SEA – Sam Darnold – 20/28, 257 yards, TD, INT

**Top rushers**

- KC – Kenneth Walker III – 14 rushes, 36 yards
- SEA – Emanuel Wilson – 24 rushes, 100 yards, TD

**Top receivers**

- KC – Travis Kelce – 4 receptions, 44 yards
- SEA – Jaxon Smith-Njigba – 9 receptions, 150 yards, TD

With the loss, the Chiefs started 5–1 for the fourth time in nine seasons. This marked Kenneth Walker III's return to Lumen Field to face his former team.

==== Week 8: at Denver Broncos ====
Week 8: Kansas City Chiefs at Denver Broncos – Game summary

Quarter	1	2	3	4	Total
Chiefs	7	10	7	0	**24**
**Broncos**	3	10	0	15	**28**

at Empower Field at Mile High, Denver, Colorado

- Date: November 1
- Game time: 3:25 p.m. CST/2:25 p.m. MST
- Game weather: Cloudy, 63 °F (17 °C)
- Game attendance: 76,831
- Referee: Clete Blakeman
- TV announcers (CBS): Jim Nantz, JJ Watt and Tracy Wolfson
- Recap, Game Book

Game information

**First quarter**

- DEN – Wil Lutz 39-yard field goal, 9:43. Broncos 3–0. **Drive: 8 plays, 62 yards, 3:58.**
- KC – Rashee Rice 11-yard pass from Patrick Mahomes (Harrison Butker kick), 6:04. Chiefs 7–3. **Drive: 7 plays, 69 yards, 3:39.**

**Second quarter**

- DEN – Wil Lutz 45-yard field goal, 14:08. Chiefs 7–6. **Drive: 9 plays, 44 yards, 2:59.**
- KC – Emmett Johnson 73-yard pass from Patrick Mahomes (Harrison Butker kick), 7:40. Chiefs 14–6. **Drive: 9 plays, 65 yards, 3:18.**
- DEN – Jaylen Waddle 1-yard pass from Bo Nix (Wil Lutz kick), 1:15. Chiefs 14–13. **Drive: 12 plays, 69 yards, 6:25.**
- KC – Harrison Butker 45-yard field goal, 0:19. Chiefs 17–13. **Drive: 6 plays, 47 yards, 0:56.**

**Third quarter**

- KC – Noah Gray 4-yard pass from Patrick Mahomes (Harrison Butker kick), 1:38. Chiefs 24–13. **Drive: 11 plays, 63 yards, 5:24.**

**Fourth quarter**

- DEN – Nate Adkins 2-yard pass from Bo Nix (Bo Nix–Jaylen Waddle pass), 8:55. Chiefs 24–21. **Drive: 9 plays, 80 yards, 4:18.**
- DEN – Jonah Coleman 5-yard run (Wil Lutz kick), 1:56. Broncos 28–24. **Drive: 2 plays, 56 yards, 0:35.**

**Top passers**

- KC – Patrick Mahomes – 30/41, 321 yards, 3 TD
- DEN – Bo Nix – 20/32, 222 yards, 2 TD

**Top rushers**

- KC – Kenneth Walker III – 21 rushes, 69 yards
- DEN – Jonah Coleman – 11 rushes, 41 yards, TD

**Top receivers**

- KC – Emmett Johnson – 5 receptions, 128 yards, TD
- DEN – Jonah Coleman – 4 receptions, 63 yards

The Chiefs held a 24–13 lead heading into the fourth quarter; however, Broncos quarterback Bo Nix led an offensive surge, resulting in 15 unanswered points. With less than two minutes remaining, Patrick Mahomes drove the Chiefs deep into opposing territory, but on the game’s final play—a 4th and goal attempt—defensive lineman Malcolm Roach recorded a sack to seal the victory for Denver. With their fourth straight road loss to the Broncos dating back to 2023, the Chiefs fell to 5–2 and fell out of first place in the AFC West.

==== Week 9: vs. New York Jets ====
Week 9: New York Jets at Kansas City Chiefs – Game summary

Quarter	1	2	3	4	Total
Jets	6	6	0	0	**12**
**Chiefs**	0	14	14	7	**35**

at Arrowhead Stadium, Kansas City, Missouri

- Date: November 8
- Game time: 12:00 p.m. CST
- Game weather: Sunny, 57 °F (14 °C)
- Game attendance: 73,628
- Referee: Adrian Hill
- TV announcers (CBS): Jim Nantz, J.J. Watt and Tracy Wolfson
- Recap, Game Book

Game information

**First quarter**

- NYJ – Jason Sanders 23-yard field goal, 6:47. Jets 3–0. **Drive: 14 plays, 64 yards, 8:13.**
- NYJ – Jason Sanders 48-yard field goal, 4:35. Jets 6–0. **Drive: 4 plays, 4 yards, 0:59.**

**Second quarter**

- KC – Kenneth Walker III 7-yard pass from Patrick Mahomes (Harrison Butker kick), 14:56. Chiefs 7–6. **Drive: 10 plays, 82 yards, 4:39.**
- NYJ – Jason Sanders 49-yard field goal, 8:12. Jets 9–7. **Drive: 12 plays, 37 yards, 6:44.**
- KC – Kenneth Walker III 25-yard pass from Patrick Mahomes (Harrison Butker kick), 5:37. Chiefs 14–9. **Drive: 2 plays, 24 yards, 0:44.**
- NYJ – Jason Sanders 54-yard field goal, 2:16. Chiefs 14–12. **Drive: 8 plays, 31 yards, 3:21.**

**Third quarter**

- KC – Travis Kelce 1-yard rush (Harrison Butker kick), 10:20. Chiefs 21–12. **Drive: 10 plays, 60 yards, 4:40.**
- KC – Kenneth Walker III 2-yard rush (Harrison Butker kick), 0:11. Chiefs 28–12. **Drive: 8 plays, 82 yards, 4:03.**

**Fourth quarter**

- KC – Emmett Johnson 6-yard rush (Harrison Butker kick), 3:35. Chiefs 35–12. **Drive: 8 plays, 57 yards, 2:55.**

**Top passers**

- NJY – Geno Smith – 18/32, 165 yards
- KC – Patrick Mahomes – 23/31, 242 yards, 2 TD

**Top rushers**

- NYJ – Breece Hall – 15 rushes, 61 yards
- KC – Kenneth Walker III – 18 rushes, 102 yards, TD

**Top receivers**

- NYJ – Omar Cooper Jr. – 8 receptions, 58 yards
- KC – Travis Kelce – 4 receptions, 72 yards

This game was mentioned in the November 8, 2026 edition of Pearls Before Swine.

==== Week 10: at Atlanta Falcons ====
Week 10: Kansas City Chiefs at Atlanta Falcons – Game summary

Quarter	1	2	3	4	Total
**Chiefs**	7	7	7	14	**35**
Falcons	0	3	0	10	**13**

at Mercedes-Benz Stadium, Atlanta, Georgia

- Date: November 15
- Game time: 1:00 p.m. EST/12:00 p.m. CST
- Game weather: None (retractable roof closed)
- Game attendance: 72,045
- Referee: Alan Eck
- TV announcers (CBS): Jim Nantz, J.J. Watt and Tracy Wolfson
- Recap, Game Book

Game information

**First quarter**

- KC – Emmett Johnson 12-yard pass from Patrick Mahomes (Harrison Butker kick), 8:53. Chiefs 7–0. **Drive: 10 plays, 80 yards, 5:03.**

**Second quarter**

- ATL – Jake Moody 28-yard field goal, 7:12. Chiefs 7–3. **Drive: 9 plays, 42 yards, 6:16.**
- KC – Josh Downs 18-yard pass from Patrick Mahomes (Harrison Butker kick), 0:18. Chiefs 14–3. **Drive: 7 plays, 79 yards, 1:56.**

**Third quarter**

- KC – Cyrus Allen 39-yard pass from Patrick Mahomes (Harrison Butker kick), 5:02. Chiefs 21–3. **Drive: 4 plays, 50 yards, 1:52.**

**Fourth quarter**

- KC – Emmett Johnson 6-yard pass from Patrick Mahomes (Harrison Butker kick), 9:55. Chiefs 28–3. **Drive: 8 plays, 87 yards, 3:47.**
- ATL – Bijan Robinson 3-yard run (Jake Moody kick), 8:12. Chiefs 28–10. **Drive: 6 plays, 73 yards, 1:43.**
- ATL – Jake Moody 38-yard field goal, 6:45. Chiefs 28–13. **Drive: 5 plays, 30 yards, 1:27.**
- KC – Andrew Armstrong 43-yard pass from Patrick Mahomes (Harrison Butker kick), 4:18. Chiefs 35–13. **Drive: 5 plays, 75 yards, 2:27.**

**Top passers**

- KC – Patrick Mahomes – 22/35, 348 yards, 5 TD
- ATL – Michael Penix Jr. – 23/43, 286 yards, INT

**Top rushers**

- KC – Emmett Johnson – 22 rushes, 101 yards
- ATL – Bijan Robinson – 16 rushes, 71 yards, TD

**Top receivers**

- KC – Rashee Rice – 5 receptions, 82 yards
- ATL – Drake London – 6 receptions, 109 yards

==== Week 11: vs. Arizona Cardinals ====
Week 11: Arizona Cardinals at Kansas City Chiefs – Game summary

Quarter	1	2	3	4	Total
Cardinals	0	7	0	0	**7**
**Chiefs**	14	13	0	7	**34**

at Arrowhead Stadium, Kansas City, Missouri

- Date: November 22
- Game time: 12:00 p.m. CST
- Game weather: Mostly sunny, 46 °F (8 °C)
- Game attendance: 73,511
- Referee: Brad Allen
- TV announcers (CBS): Ian Eagle, Ross Tucker, and Evan Washburn
- Recap, Game Book

Game information

**First quarter**

- KC – Travis Kelce 8-yard pass from Patrick Mahomes (Harrison Butker kick), 9:46. Chiefs 7–0. **Drive: 11 plays, 72 yards, 5:14.**
- KC – Emmett Johnson 3-yard rush (Harrison Butker kick), 0:48. Chiefs 14–0. **Drive: 16 plays, 80 yards, 7:22.**

**Second quarter**

- ARI – Simi Fehoko 2-yard pass from Josh Johnson (Chad Ryland kick), 9:48. Chiefs 14–7. **Drive: 10 plays, 63 yards, 6:00.**
- KC – Harrison Butker 40-yard field goal, 4:32. Chiefs 17–7. **Drive: 10 plays, 48 yards, 5:16.**
- KC – Travis Kelce 22-yard pass from Patrick Mahomes (Harrison Butker kick), 1:54. Chiefs 24–7. **Drive: 3 plays, 37 yards, 1:04.**
- KC – Harrison Butker 44-yard field goal, 0:00. Chiefs 27–7. **Drive: 11 plays, 48 yards, 1:10.**

**Third quarter**

- No scoring plays

**Fourth quarter**

- KC – Xavier Worthy 18-yard pass from Patrick Mahomes (Harrison Butker kick), 14:54. Chiefs 34–7. **Drive: 9 plays, 97 yards, 3:11.**

**Top passers**

- ARI – Josh Johnson – 18/31, 155 yards, TD
- KC – Patrick Mahomes – 27/39, 324 yards, 3 TD

**Top rushers**

- ARI – Bam Knight – 7 rushes, 35 yards
- KC – Emmett Johnson – 23 rushes, 105 yards, TD

**Top receivers**

- ARI – Harrison Wallace III – 4 receptions, 57 yards
- KC – Travis Kelce – 6 receptions, 74 yards, 2 TD

==== Week 12: at Buffalo Bills ====
Thanksgiving Day games

Week 12: Kansas City Chiefs at Buffalo Bills – Game summary

Quarter	1	2	3	4	Total
Chiefs	0	0	0	0	**0**
Bills	0	0	0	0	**0**

at New Highmark Stadium, Orchard Park, New York

- Date: November 26
- Game time: 8:20 p.m. EST/7:20 p.m. CST
- TV announcers (NBC): Mike Tirico, Cris Collinsworth and Melissa Stark
- Preview

=== Standings ===
==== Division ====
AFC West
	W	L	T	PCT	DIV	CONF	PF	PA	STK
Kansas City Chiefs	8	2	0	.800	3–1	6–1	271	163	W3
Denver Broncos	7	2	0	.778	2–1	3–1	198	186	W5
Las Vegas Raiders	4	6	0	.400	1–1	3–3	251	289	L2
Los Angeles Chargers	1	8	0	.111	0–3	1–5	144	239	W1

==== Conference ====
AFC
Seed	Team	Division	W	L	T	PCT	DIV	CONF	SOS	SOV	STK
**Division leaders**
1	Buffalo Bills	East	9	1	0	.900	2–1	6–1	.424	.416	W6
2	Kansas City Chiefs	West	8	2	0	.800	3–1	6–1	.374	.300	W3
3 (Note: Jacksonville wins tie break over Cincinnati based on head-to-head victory.)	Jacksonville Jaguars	South	7	2	0	.778	2–1	6–2	.444	.408	W3
4	Cincinnati Bengals	North	7	2	0	.778	2–1	5–2	.389	.310	W5
**Wild cards**
5	Denver Broncos	West	7	2	0	.778	2–1	3–1	.591	.522	W5
6 (Note: Cleveland wins tie break over Pittsburgh based on division record.)	Cleveland Browns	North	6	4	0	.600	2–1	4–3	.410	.377	W1
7	Pittsburgh Steelers	North	6	4	0	.600	2–2	3–3	.465	.417	L2
**In the hunt**
8	New England Patriots	East	5	5	0	.500	3–0	5–1	.576	.440	L2
9 (Note: Houston wins tie break over Las Vegas based on strength of victory.)	Houston Texans	South	4	6	0	.400	3–1	4–4	.480	.308	W1
10	Las Vegas Raiders	West	4	6	0	.400	1–1	3–3	.500	.179	L2
11	Baltimore Ravens	North	4	7	0	.364	0–2	2–5	.459	.286	L6
12	Indianapolis Colts	South	3	8	0	.273	1–3	2–6	.463	.293	L1
13	New York Jets	East	2	8	0	.200	0–3	2–5	.560	.350	L5
14	Los Angeles Chargers	West	1	8	0	.111	0–3	1–5	.560	.364	W1
15 (Note: Tennessee wins tie break over Miami based on strength of victory.)	Tennessee Titans	South	1	9	0	.100	1–2	1–6	.465	.273	L4
16	Miami Dolphins	East	1	9	0	.100	1–2	1–6	.622	.200	L4
