= 2017 Kansas City Chiefs season =

NFL team season

- Owner: The Hunt family (Clark Hunt Chairman and CEO)
- General manager: Brett Veach
- Head coach: Andy Reid
- Offensive coordinator: Matt Nagy
- Defensive coordinator: Bob Sutton
- Home stadium: Arrowhead Stadium

Results
- Record: 10–6
- Division place: 1st AFC West
- Playoffs: Lost Wild Card Playoffs (vs. Titans) 21–22
- All-Pros: TE Travis Kelce (2nd team); OT Mitchell Schwartz (2nd team)
- Pro Bowlers: 4: WR Tyreek Hill; RB Kareem Hunt; TE Travis Kelce; QB Alex Smith
- Team MVP: Alex Smith
- Team ROY: Kareem Hunt

Uniform
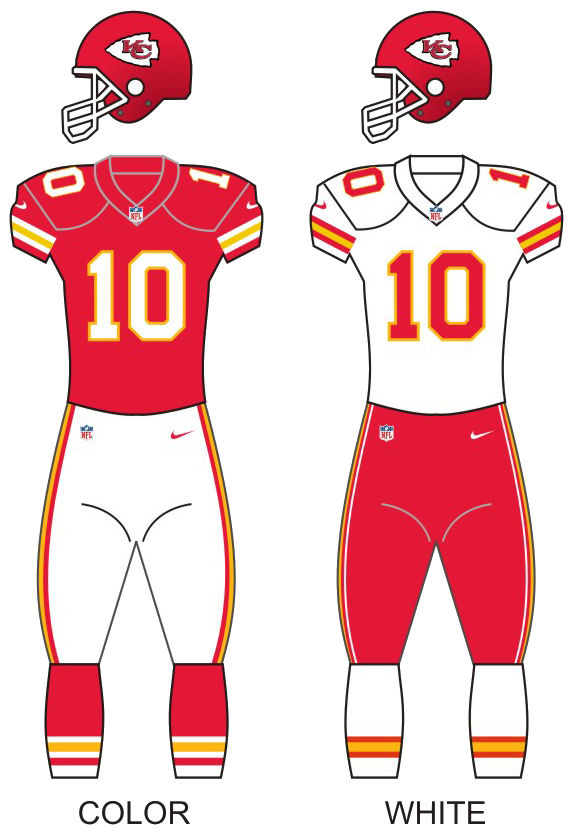

The 2017 season was the Kansas City Chiefs' 48th in the National Football League (NFL), their 55th as the Kansas City Chiefs, their 58th overall, their fifth under head coach Andy Reid and their first under general manager Brett Veach. They won the AFC West, but lost to the Tennessee Titans in the wild card round after blowing a 21–3 lead at the half. The season was the first to feature future two-time MVP and three-time Super Bowl MVP Patrick Mahomes whose first start came in the last game of the regular season against the Denver Broncos, a game which had no playoff implications as the Chiefs had secured the division in Week 16.

Until 2025, this was the last season that the Chiefs did not win a playoff game or advance to at least the AFC Championship Game.

== Season notes ==
General manager John Dorsey was fired on June 22, 2017. On July 10, the Chiefs promoted co-director of player personnel Brett Veach to general manager. The only other personnel change for the Chiefs that occurred was co-offensive coordinator Brad Childress was promoted to assistant head coach, leaving Matt Nagy as the only offensive coordinator. The Chiefs most notable transaction of the off-season came when they released the franchise's all-time leading rusher, Jamaal Charles, after 9 seasons. After being released, Charles signed with the Chiefs division rival, the Denver Broncos.

Following the Atlanta Falcons 23–17 loss to the Buffalo Bills in Week 4, the Chiefs became the last undefeated team left in the NFL for the fourth time in team history, and the second time under Andy Reid, with the previous times being in 2003, 2010, and 2013. After their 5–0 start, the Chiefs lost 6 of their next 7 games, the lone win coming against the Broncos. During this stretch, the Chiefs offense struggled, leading to head coach Andy Reid giving play calling duties during games to offensive coordinator Matt Nagy.

After four straight losses, the Chiefs won three straight games to win the AFC West for the second consecutive season. It was the first time in franchise history that the Chiefs have won back-to-back division titles. It also marked the Chiefs qualifying for the playoffs three consecutive seasons, which they had not done since they made six consecutive playoff appearances from 1990 to 1995. They finished the season with a 10–6 record, earning the AFC's fourth seed in the playoffs. In the wild-card round, they would lose to the Tennessee Titans 22–21. In the game, the Chiefs had a commanding 21–3 lead at halftime, but failed to score a single point in the second half. The loss extended their NFL record six straight home playoff losses. It was the second time under Andy Reid they lost a playoff game after being up by more than 10 points at halftime. The Chiefs have lost three consecutive playoff games, and have lost 11 of their last 12. The Chiefs first two wins of the season came against teams that eventually meet in Super Bowl LII to end the season. the New England Patriots and Philadelphia Eagles. Additionally by beating the Patriots in Week 1, the Chiefs extending their winning streak against the defending Super Bowl champs to six.

== NFL Top 100 ==
The Chiefs had 6 players ranked in NFL Network's annual Top 100 players list, which was tied for the 3rd most.

Rank	Player	Position	Change
13	Eric Berry	S	▲42
26	Travis Kelce	TE	▲65
32	Marcus Peters	CB	▲33
36	Tyreek Hill	WR	NR
76	Justin Houston	LB	▼50
81	Alex Smith	QB	0

== Transactions ==
=== Offseason ===
==== Reserve/future free agent contracts ====
Player	Position
Isaiah Battle	T
Will Ratelle	FB
Julian Wilson	CB
Joseph Cheek	G
Jordan Devey	G
Jimmy Hall	S
Cory Johnson	NT
Seantavius Jones	WR
David King	DE
Earl Okine	LB
Joel Stave	QB
Khaseem Greene	LB
Josh James	T
Montori Hughes	DT
Darrin Reaves	RB

==== Cuts ====
Position	Player	2017 team
RB	Jamaal Charles	Denver Broncos
DE	Jaye Howard	Chicago Bears
WR	Jeremy Maclin	Baltimore Ravens

==== Free agents ====
Position	Player	Status*	2016 team(s)	2017 team
S	Eric Berry	UFA	Kansas City Chiefs	Kansas City Chiefs
TE	Orson Charles	UFA	Detroit Lions	Kansas City Chiefs
LB	Reshard Cliett	UFA	Denver Broncos; New York Jets; Arizona Cardinals	Kansas City Chiefs
WR	Kenny Cook	ERFA	Kansas City Chiefs	TBD
RB	Knile Davis	UFA	Kansas City Chiefs	Pittsburgh Steelers
TE	Gavin Escobar	UFA	Dallas Cowboys	Kansas City Chiefs
QB	Nick Foles*	UFA	Kansas City Chiefs	Philadelphia Eagles
S	Marqueston Huff	UFA	Jacksonville Jaguars; Baltimore Ravens	Kansas City Chiefs
CB	Stanley Jean-Baptiste	UFA	Seattle Seahawks	Kansas City Chiefs
DE	Jarvis Jenkins	UFA	New York Jets; Kansas City Chiefs	Kansas City Chiefs
DT	Bennie Logan	UFA	Philadelphia Eagles	Kansas City Chiefs
FB	Trey Millard	ERFA	Kansas City Chiefs	TBD
P	Will Monday	UFA	Pittsburgh Steelers	Kansas City Chiefs
G	Mike Person	UFA	Kansas City Chiefs	Kansas City Chiefs
DT	Dontari Poe	UFA	Kansas City Chiefs	Atlanta Falcons
DE	Kendall Reyes	UFA	Kansas City Chiefs	TBD
LB	Marcus Rush	UFA	Jacksonville Jaguars	Kansas City Chiefs
K	Cairo Santos	RFA	Kansas City Chiefs	Kansas City Chiefs
RB	C. J. Spiller	UFA	New Orleans Saints; Seattle Seahawks; New York Jets	Kansas City Chiefs
S	Daniel Sorensen	RFA	Kansas City Chiefs	Kansas City Chiefs
G	Andrew Tiller	UFA	San Francisco 49ers	Kansas City Chiefs
WR	Albert Wilson	RFA	Kansas City Chiefs	Kansas City Chiefs
LS	James Winchester	RFA	Kansas City Chiefs	Kansas City Chiefs
*RFA: Restricted free agent, UFA: Unrestricted free agent, ERFA: Exclusive rights free agent

*Nick Foles had an option on his contract for the 2017 season that the Chiefs declined

==== Trades ====
Position	Player/pick received	Team	Compensation
NA	5th round pick 2017 draft	New England Patriots	TE James O'Shaughnessy; 6th round pick 2017 draft

==== Draft ====
2017 Kansas City Chiefs draft
Round	Pick	Player	Position	College	Notes
1	10	Patrick Mahomes *	Quarterback	Texas Tech	
2	59	Tanoh Kpassagnon	Defensive end	Villanova	
3	85	Kareem Hunt *	Running back	Toledo	
4	139	Jehu Chesson	Wide receiver	Michigan	
5	183	Ukeme Eligwe	Linebacker	Georgia Southern	
6	218	Leon McQuay III	Safety	USC	Compensatory selection
Made roster * Made at least one Pro Bowl during career

Notes

- The Chiefs forfeited their original 6th round selection (what would have been the 211th overall selection) as part of their punishment for a violation of the NFL's Anti-Tampering policy during the 2015 free agency period.
- The Chiefs traded their 1st round selection, (27th overall), their 3rd round selection (91st overall), and their 2018 1st round selection for the Buffalo Bills 1st round selection (10th overall)
- The Chiefs traded their 3rd round selection (104th overall), 4th round selection (132nd overall), and 7th round selection (245th overall) to the Minnesota Vikings for their 3rd round selection (86th overall)
- The Chiefs traded tight end James O'Shaughnessy and their 6th round selection (216th overall) to the New England Patriots for the Patriots 5th round selection (183rd overall)
- The Chiefs traded two 5th round selections (170th overall and 180th overall) to the Minnesota Vikings for their 4th round selection (139th overall)

==== Undrafted free agents ====
Position	Player	College
T	Corin Brooks	Texas–Permian Basin
S	Devin Chappell	Oregon State
WR	Gehrig Dieter	Alabama
S	Damariay Drew	California
WR	Anas Hasic	West Florida
TE	Wyatt Houston	Utah State
WR	Marcus Kemp	Hawaii
CB	Ashton Lampkin	Oklahoma State
G	Damien Mama	USC
WR	Alonzo Moore	Nebraska
CB	J. R. Nelson	Montana
S	Jordan Sterns	Oklahoma State
WR	Tony Stevens	Auburn

==== Players signed from rookie mini camp tryouts ====
Position	Player	College
NT	Ricky Ali'ifua	Utah State
TE	Emmanuel Byrd	Marshall
RB	Devine Redding	Indiana
WR	Jamari Staples	Louisville

==== Players cut in the offseason before playing for the Chiefs ====
Position	Player
Julian Wilson	CB
Jimmy Hall	CB
Anas Hasic	WR
Wyatt Houston	TE
Cory Johnson*	DT
Will Ratelle*	FB
Darrin Reaves	RB
Kelvin Taylor	RB
Jamari Staples	WR

*Indicates player was on the practice squad during the 2016 season but never on the active roster

== Staff ==
2017 Kansas City Chiefs staff
Front office: Chairman/CEO – Clark Hunt; President – Mark Donovan; General manager – Brett Veach; Director of football administration – Brandt Tilis; Salary cap & legal executive – Chris Shea; Director of player personnel – Mike Borgonzi; Director of college scouting – Ryan Poles; Assistant director of college scouting – Ryne Nutt; Director of pro personnel – Tim Terry; Head coaches: Head coach – Andy Reid; Assistant head coach – Brad Childress; Senior assistant to the head coach – Porter Ellett; Offensive coaches: Offensive coordinator – Matt Nagy; Assistant quarterbacks – Corey Matthaei; Running backs – Eric Bieniemy; Wide receivers – Greg Lewis; Tight ends – Tom Melvin; Offensive line – Andy Heck; Offensive quality control – Joe Blaymeir; Offensive quality control – Mike Kafka; Statistical analysis coordinator – Mike Frazier	Defensive coaches: Defensive coordinator – Bob Sutton; Defensive line – Britt Reid; Assistant defensive line – Mike Smith; Linebackers – Gary Gibbs; Assistant linebackers – Mark DeLeone; Defensive backs – Emmitt Thomas; Secondary/cornerbacks – Al Harris; Defensive assistant – Terry Bradden; Special projects – Tommy Brasher; Special teams coaches: Special teams coordinator – Dave Toub; Assistant special teams – Rod Wilson; Strength and conditioning: Head athletic trainer – Rick Burkholder; Strength and conditioning – Barry Rubin; Assistant strength and conditioning – Travis Crittenden; Assistant strength and conditioning – Devin Woodhouse; Assistant strength and conditioning – Ryan Reynolds

== Final roster ==
2017 Kansas City Chiefs roster
Quarterbacks (QB): 9 Tyler Bray; 15 Patrick Mahomes; 11 Alex Smith; Running backs (RB): 31 Akeem Hunt; 27 Kareem Hunt; 42 Anthony Sherman FB; 35 Charcandrick West; Wide receivers (WR): 80 Jehu Chesson; 10 Tyreek Hill; 14 Demarcus Robinson; 13 De'Anthony Thomas; 12 Albert Wilson; Tight ends (TE): 82 Orson Charles; 84 Demetrius Harris; 87 Travis Kelce	Offensive linemen (OL): 65 Jordan Devey; 76 Laurent Duvernay-Tardif G; 79 Parker Ehinger G; 75 Cameron Erving G/T; 72 Eric Fisher T; 73 Zach Fulton C/G; 71 Mitchell Schwartz T; 70 Bryan Witzmann G; Defensive linemen (DL): 97 Allen Bailey DE; 74 Justin Hamilton NT; 94 Jarvis Jenkins DE; 95 Chris Jones DE; 96 Bennie Logan NT; 99 Rakeem Nuñez-Roches DE	Linebackers (LB): 45 Ukeme Eligwe OLB; 91 Tamba Hali OLB; 50 Justin Houston OLB; 56 Derrick Johnson ILB; 92 Tanoh Kpassagnon OLB; 57 Kevin Pierre-Louis ILB; 59 Reggie Ragland ILB; 48 Terrance Smith ILB; 53 Ramik Wilson ILB; 51 Frank Zombo OLB; Defensive backs (DB): 25 Kenneth Acker CB; 23 Phillip Gaines CB; 34 Leon McQuay FS; 39 Terrance Mitchell CB; 21 Eric Murray SS; 20 Steven Nelson CB; 38 Ron Parker FS; 22 Marcus Peters CB; 40 Keith Reaser CB; 24 Darrelle Revis CB; 49 Daniel Sorensen SS; Special teams (ST): 7 Harrison Butker K; 2 Dustin Colquitt P; 41 James Winchester LS	Practice squad: 43 George Atkinson III RB; 4 Gehrig Dieter WR; 88 Anthony Firkser TE; 64 Dillon Gordon T; 54 Tyrone Holmes OLB; 62 Kaleb Johnson G; 19 Marcus Kemp WR; 93 Mike Purcell NT; 26 Will Redmond CB; 77 Andrew Wylie T; Reserve: 46 Keith Baxter CB (IR); 29 Eric Berry SS (IR); 46 Devin Chappell SS (IR); 17 Chris Conley WR (IR); 55 Dee Ford OLB (IR); 6 Ashton Lampkin CB (IR); 61 Mitch Morse C (IR); 52 Dadi Nicolas OLB (PUP); 30 Steven Terrell CB (IR); 32 Spencer Ware RB (IR); Rookies in italics 53 active, 10 reserve, 10 practice squad

== Preseason ==
=== Schedule ===
Week	Date	Opponent	Result	Record	Venue	Recap
1	August 11	San Francisco 49ers	L 17–27	0–1	Arrowhead Stadium	Recap
2	August 19	at Cincinnati Bengals	W 30–12	1–1	Paul Brown Stadium	Recap
3	August 25	at Seattle Seahawks	L 13–26	1–2	Century Link Field	Recap
4	August 31	Tennessee Titans	W 30–6	2–2	Arrowhead Stadium	Recap

=== Game summaries ===
==== Week 1: vs. San Francisco 49ers ====
Week 1: San Francisco 49ers at Kansas City Chiefs – Game summary

Quarter	1	2	3	4	Total
49ers	3	6	0	18	27
Chiefs	7	0	10	0	17

at Arrowhead Stadium, Kansas City, Missouri

- Date: August 11
- Game time: 8:00 p.m. CDT
- Game weather: Sunny, 79 °F (26 °C)
- Game attendance: 66,706
- Referee: Carl Cheffers
- Recap, Game Book

Game information

First quarter

- KC – Spencer Ware 1-yard run (Sam Ficken kick), 11:38. Chiefs 7–0. Drive: 8 plays, 75 yards, 3:22.
- SF – Robbie Gould 38-yard field goal, 6:11. Chiefs 7–3. Drive: 4 plays, 5 yards, 1:16.

Second quarter

- SF – Nick Rose 22-yard field goal, 12:22. Chiefs 7–6. Drive: 13 plays, 92 yards, 6:06.
- SF – Nick Rose 27-yard field goal, 6:53. 49ers 9–7. Drive: 8 plays, 60 yards, 2:51.

Third quarter

- KC – Sam Ficken 45-yard field goal, 10:30. Chiefs 10–9. Drive: 6 plays, 36 yards, 2:58.
- KC – Marcus Kemp 1-yard pass from Patrick Mahomes (Sam Ficken kick), 6:08. Chiefs 17–9. Drive: 3 plays, 8 yards, 0:54.

Fourth quarter

- SF – Kendrick Bourne 46-yard pass from C. J. Beathard (C. J. Beathard–Kendrick Bourne pass), 13:31. Tied 17–17. Drive: 5 plays, 67 yards, 1:31.
- SF – Tyler McCloskey 2-yard pass from C. J. Beathard (Nick Rose kick), 10:41. 49ers 24–17. Drive: 5 plays, 23 yards, 2:28.
- SF – Robbie Gould 38-yard field goal, 0:56. 49ers 27–17. Drive: 12 plays, 72 yards, 6:56.

Top passers

- SF – Matt Barkley – 10/17, 168 yards
- KC – Tyler Bray – 5/8, 63 yards, INT

Top rushers

- SF – Raheem Mostert – 15 rushes, 89 yards
- KC – Alex Smith – 1 rush, 10 yards

Top receivers

- SF – Kendrick Bourne – 4 receptions, 88 yards, TD
- KC – Chris Conley – 2 receptions, 46 yards

==== Week 2: at Cincinnati Bengals ====
Week 2: Kansas City Chiefs at Cincinnati Bengals – Game summary

Quarter	1	2	3	4	Total
Chiefs	3	13	14	0	30
Bengals	3	6	3	0	12

at Paul Brown Stadium, Cincinnati, Ohio

- Date: August 19
- Game time: 7:00 p.m. EDT/6:00 p.m. CDT
- Game weather: Partly cloudy, 86 °F (30 °C)
- Game attendance: 47,714
- Referee: Walt Coleman
- Recap, Game Book

Game information

First quarter

- CIN – Randy Bullock 47-yard field goal, 10:36. Bengals 3–0. Drive: 12 plays, 46 yards, 7:24.
- KC – Sam Ficken 23-yard field goal, 3:18. Tied 3–3. Drive: 13 plays, 70 yards, 7:18.

Second quarter

- KC – Demetrius Harris 5-yard pass from Alex Smith (Sam Ficken kick), 12:27. Chiefs 10–3. Drive: 7 plays, 46 yards, 3:46.
- CIN – Jake Elliott 32-yard field goal, 7:22. Chiefs 10–6. Drive: 11 plays, 61 yards, 5:05.
- KC – Demetrius Harris 1-yard pass from Patrick Mahomes (kick failed, wide right), 1:05. Chiefs 16–6. Drive: 12 plays, 75 yards, 6:17.
- CIN – Randy Bullock 26-yard field goal, 0:00. Chiefs 16–9. Drive: 6 plays, 67 yards, 1:05.

Third quarter

- KC – Demetrius Harris 5-yard pass from Patrick Mahomes (Sam Ficken kick), 9:15. Chiefs 23–9. Drive: 12 plays, 75 yards, 5:45.
- KC – Seantavius Jones 18-yard pass from Tyler Bray (Sam Ficken kick), 8:17. Chiefs 30–9. Drive: 1 play, 18 yards, 0:05.
- CIN – Jake Elliott 39-yard field goal, 0:46. Chiefs 30–12. Drive: 8 plays, 38 yards, 3:24.

Fourth quarter

- No scoring plays.

Top passers

- KC – Patrick Mahomes – 10/14, 88 yards, 2 TD
- CIN – Andy Dalton – 7/13, 98 yards

Top rushers

- KC – Charcandrick West – 7 rushes, 113 yards
- CIN – Jeremy Hill – 6 rushes, 28 yards

Top receivers

- KC – Travis Kelce – 1 reception, 36 yards
- CIN – Tyler Boyd – 2 receptions, 45 yards

==== Week 3: at Seattle Seahawks ====
Week 3: Kansas City Chiefs at Seattle Seahawks – Game summary

Quarter	1	2	3	4	Total
Chiefs	3	7	0	3	13
Seahawks	3	13	3	7	26

at CenturyLink Field, Seattle, Washington

- Date: August 25
- Game time: 7:00 p.m. CDT/5:00 p.m. PDT
- Game weather: Sunny, 74 °F (23 °C)
- Game attendance: 68,541
- Referee: Craig Wrolstad
- Recap, Game Book

Game information

First quarter

- KC – Sam Ficken 30-yard field goal, 7:06. Chiefs 3–0. Drive: 14 plays, 63 yards, 7:54.
- SEA – Blair Walsh 41-yard field goal, 3:44. Tied 3–3. Drive: 6 plays, 52 yards, 3:22.

Second quarter

- SEA – Blair Walsh 36-yard field goal, 13:43. Seahawks 6–3. Drive: 6 plays, 62 yards, 2:32.
- SEA – Tre Madden 2-yard pass from Russell Wilson (Blair Walsh kick), 7:22. Seahawks 13–3. Drive: 8 plays, 62 yards, 4:07.
- KC – De'Anthony Thomas 95-yard kickoff return (Sam Ficken kick), 7:10. Seahawks 13–10.
- SEA – Blair Walsh 21-yard field goal, 0:03. Seahawks 16–10. Drive: 6 plays, 51 yards, 0:30.

Third quarter

- SEA – Blair Walsh 47-yard field goal, 11:39. Seahawks 19–10. Drive: 10 plays, 49 yards, 3:21.

Fourth quarter

- KC – Sam Ficken 32-yard field goal, 14:47. Seahawks 19–13. Drive: 15 plays, 74 yards, 5:45.
- SEA – Tanner McEvoy 28-yard pass from Austin Davis (Blair Walsh kick), 6:46. Seahawks 26–13. Drive: 9 plays, 68 yards, 4:55.

Top passers

- KC – Patrick Mahomes – 8/15, 70 yards
- SEA – Russell Wilson – 13/19, 200 yards, TD

Top rushers

- KC – Kareem Hunt – 9 rushes, 39 yards
- SEA – Chris Carson – 8 rushes, 46 yards

Top receivers

- KC – Gehrig Dieter – 3 receptions, 42 yards
- SEA – Jermaine Kearse – 3 receptions, 59 yards

==== Week 4: vs. Tennessee Titans ====
Week 4: Tennessee Titans at Kansas City Chiefs – Game summary

Quarter	1	2	3	4	Total
Titans	3	0	3	0	6
Chiefs	0	13	10	7	30

at Arrowhead Stadium, Kansas City, Missouri

- Date: August 31
- Game time: 7:30 p.m. CDT
- Game weather: Sunny, 79 °F (26 °C)
- Game attendance: 60,213
- Referee: Ronald Torbert
- Recap, Game Book

Game information

First quarter

- TEN – Ryan Succop 40-yard field goal, 1:32. Titans 3–0. Drive: 10 plays, 61 yards, 1:56.

Second quarter

- KC – Jehu Chesson 76-yard punt return (kick failed, hit right upright), 9:36. Chiefs 6–3.
- KC – Demarcus Robinson 28-yard pass from Patrick Mahomes (Cairo Santos kick), 0:18. Chiefs 13–3. Drive: 5 plays, 64 yards, 1:10.

Third quarter

- KC – Cairo Santos 48-yard field goal, 12:13. Chiefs 16–3. Drive: 7 plays, 44 yards, 2:47.
- TEN – Ryan Succop 48-yard field goal, 8:05. Chiefs 16–6. Drive: 9 plays, 45 yards, 4:08.
- KC – Gavin Escobar 2-yard pass from Tyler Bray (Cairo Santos kick), 1:52. Chiefs 23–6. Drive: 10 plays, 85 yards, 6:13.

Fourth quarter

- KC – Tevin Jones 68-yard pass from Joel Stave (Cairo Santos kick), 9:54. Chiefs 30–6. Drive: 3 plays, 71 yards, 1:32.

Top passers

- TEN – Alex Tanney – 9/22, 101 yards, INT
- KC – Patrick Mahomes – 9/16, 183 yards, TD

Top rushers

- TEN – David Fluellen – 19 rushes, 74 yards
- KC – Devine Redding – 21 rushes, 59 yards

Top receivers

- TEN – Jerome Cunningham – 2 receptions, 39 yards
- KC – Demarcus Robinson – 3 receptions, 127 yards, TD

== Regular season ==
=== Schedule ===
Week	Date	Opponent	Result	Record	Venue	Recap
1	September 7	at New England Patriots	**W** 42–27	1–0	Gillette Stadium	Recap
2	September 17	Philadelphia Eagles	**W** 27–20	2–0	Arrowhead Stadium	Recap
3	September 24	at **Los Angeles Chargers**	**W** 24–10	3–0	StubHub Center	Recap
4	October 2	Washington Redskins	**W** 29–20	4–0	Arrowhead Stadium	Recap
5	October 8	at Houston Texans	**W** 42–34	5–0	NRG Stadium	Recap
6	October 15	Pittsburgh Steelers	**L** 13–19	5–1	Arrowhead Stadium	Recap
7	October 19	at **Oakland Raiders**	**L** 30–31	5–2	Oakland–Alameda County Coliseum	Recap
8	October 30	**Denver Broncos**	**W** 29–19	6–2	Arrowhead Stadium	Recap
9	November 5	at Dallas Cowboys	**L** 17–28	6–3	AT&T Stadium	Recap
10	Bye					
11	November 19	at New York Giants	**L** 9–12 (OT)	6–4	MetLife Stadium	Recap
12	November 26	Buffalo Bills	**L** 10–16	6–5	Arrowhead Stadium	Recap
13	December 3	at New York Jets	**L** 31–38	6–6	MetLife Stadium	Recap
14	December 10	**Oakland Raiders**	**W** 26–15	7–6	Arrowhead Stadium	Recap
15	December 16	**Los Angeles Chargers**	**W** 30–13	8–6	Arrowhead Stadium	Recap
16	December 24	Miami Dolphins	**W** 29–13	9–6	Arrowhead Stadium	Recap
17	December 31	at **Denver Broncos**	**W** 27–24	10–6	Sports Authority Field at Mile High	Recap

Note: Intra-division opponents are in bold text.

=== Game summaries ===
==== Week 1: at New England Patriots ====
NFL Kickoff Game

Week 1: Kansas City Chiefs at New England Patriots – Game summary

Quarter	1	2	3	4	Total
**Chiefs**	7	7	7	21	**42**
Patriots	7	10	10	0	**27**

at Gillette Stadium, Foxborough, Massachusetts

- Date: September 7
- Game time: 8:30 p.m. EDT/7:30 p.m. CDT
- Game weather: Clear and warm, 63 °F (17 °C)
- Game attendance: 65,878
- Referee: Bill Vinovich
- TV announcers (NBC): Al Michaels, Cris Collinsworth and Michele Tafoya
- Recap, Game Book

Game information

**First quarter**

- NE – Mike Gillislee 2-yard run (Stephen Gostkowski kick), 2:52. Patriots 7–0. **Drive: 9 plays, 73 yards, 2:52.**
- KC – Demetrius Harris 7-yard pass from Alex Smith (Cairo Santos kick), 3:03. Tied 7–7. **Drive: 12 plays, 60 yards, 6:22.**

**Second quarter**

- NE – Stephen Gostkowski 25-yard field goal, 14.56. Patriots 10–7. **Drive: 8 plays, 67 yards, 3:07.**
- NE – Mike Gillislee 2-yard run (Stephen Gostkowski kick), 7:27. Patriots 17–7. **Drive: 11 plays, 82 yards, 5:50.**
- KC – Kareem Hunt 3-yard pass from Alex Smith (Cairo Santos kick), 0:13. Patriots 17–14. **Drive: 12 plays, 92 yards, 2:34.**

**Third quarter**

- KC – Tyreek Hill 75-yard pass from Alex Smith (Cairo Santos kick), 9:19. Chiefs 21–17. **Drive: 1 play, 75 yards, 0:09.**
- NE – Mike Gillislee 1-yard run (Stephen Gostkowski kick), 5:01. Patriots 24–21. **Drive: 3 plays, 54 yards, 1:21.**
- NE – Stephen Gostkowski 32-yard field goal, 0:09. Patriots 27–21. **Drive: 7 plays, 58 yards, 2:41.**

**Fourth quarter**

- KC – Kareem Hunt 78-yard pass from Alex Smith (Cairo Santos kick), 14:07. Chiefs 28–27. **Drive: 3 plays, 90 yards, 1:02.**
- KC – Kareem Hunt 4-yard run (Cairo Santos kick), 5:14. Chiefs 35–27. **Drive: 7 plays, 60 yards, 3:41.**
- KC – Charcandrick West 21-yard run (Cairo Santos kick), 4:00. Chiefs 42–27. **Drive: 2 plays, 79 yards, 0:15.**

**Top passers**

- KC – Alex Smith – 28/35, 368 yards, 4 TD
- NE – Tom Brady – 16/36, 267 yards

**Top rushers**

- KC – Kareem Hunt – 17 rushes, 148 yards, TD
- NE – Mike Gillislee – 15 rushes, 45 yards, 3 TD

**Top receivers**

- KC – Tyreek Hill – 7 receptions, 133 yards, TD
- NE – Danny Amendola – 6 receptions, 100 yards

==== Week 2: vs. Philadelphia Eagles ====
Week 2: Philadelphia Eagles at Kansas City Chiefs – Game summary

Quarter	1	2	3	4	Total
Eagles	3	0	7	10	**20**
**Chiefs**	3	3	7	14	**27**

at Arrowhead Stadium, Kansas City, Missouri

- Date: September 17
- Game time: 12:00 p.m. CDT
- Game weather: Cloudy, 68 °F (20 °C)
- Game attendance: 74,971
- Referee: Terry McAulay
- TV announcers (Fox): Kevin Burkhardt, Charles Davis and Pam Oliver
- Recap, Game Book

Game information

**First quarter**

- KC – Cairo Santos 34-yard field goal, 11:22. Chiefs 3–0. **Drive: 8 plays, 73 yards, 3:38.**
- PHI – Jake Elliott 34-yard field goal, 4:28. Tied 3–3. **Drive: 11 plays, 58 yards, 6:54.**

**Second quarter**

- KC – Cairo Santos 39-yard field goal, 0:17. Chiefs 6–3. **Drive: 4 plays, 3 yards, 0:49.**

**Third quarter**

- PHI – Alshon Jeffery 16-yard pass from Carson Wentz (Jake Elliott kick), 4:08. Eagles 10–6. **Drive: 7 plays, 81 yards, 4:20.**
- KC – Kareem Hunt 53-yard run (Cairo Santos kick), 1:20. Chiefs 13–10. **Drive: 5 plays, 83 yards, 2:48.**

**Fourth quarter**

- PHI – Jake Elliott 40-yard field goal, 11:57. Tied 13–13. **Drive: 10 plays, 44 yards, 4:23.**
- KC – Travis Kelce 15-yard pass from Alex Smith (Cairo Santos kick), 6:25. Chiefs 20–13. **Drive: 5 plays, 31 yards, 2:51.**
- KC – Kareem Hunt 2-yard run (Cairo Santos kick), 2:14. Chiefs 27–13. **Drive: 6 plays, 56 yards, 3:13.**
- PHI – Nelson Agholor 9-yard pass from Carson Wentz (Jake Elliott kick), 0:08. Chiefs 27–20. **Drive: 13 plays, 75 yards, 2:06.**

**Top passers**

- PHI – Carson Wentz – 25/46, 333 yards, 2 TD, INT
- KC – Alex Smith – 21/28, 251 yards, TD

**Top rushers**

- PHI – Carson Wentz – 4 rushes, 55 yards
- KC – Kareem Hunt – 13 rushes, 81 yards, 2 TD

**Top receivers**

- PHI – Alshon Jeffery – 7 receptions, 92 yards, TD
- KC – Travis Kelce – 8 receptions, 103 yards, TD

==== Week 3: at Los Angeles Chargers ====
Week 3: Kansas City Chiefs at Los Angeles Chargers – Game summary

Quarter	1	2	3	4	Total
**Chiefs**	14	3	0	7	**24**
Chargers	7	3	0	0	**10**

at StubHub Center, Carson, California

- Date: September 24
- Game time: 3:25 p.m. CDT/1:25 p.m. PDT
- Game weather: Sunny, 84 °F (29 °C)
- Game attendance: 25,386
- Referee: Walt Anderson
- TV announcers (CBS): Kevin Harlan and Rich Gannon
- Recap, Game Book

Game information

**First quarter**

- KC – Tyreek Hill 30-yard pass from Alex Smith (Cairo Santos kick), 12:03. Chiefs 7–0. **Drive: 4 plays, 43 yards, 1:56.**
- KC – Albert Wilson 6-yard pass from Alex Smith (Cairo Santos kick), 5:33. Chiefs 14–0. **Drive: 4 plays, 34 yards, 2:11.**
- LAC – Melvin Gordon 11-yard run (Younghoe Koo kick), 0:05. Chiefs 14–7. **Drive: 9 plays, 89 yards, 5:28.**

**Second quarter**

- KC – Cairo Santos 34-yard field goal, 4:30. Chiefs 17–7. **Drive: 9 plays, 37 yards, 6:09.**
- LAC – Younghoe Koo 29-yard field goal, 0:00. Chiefs 17–10. **Drive: 13 plays, 64 yards, 4:30.**

**Third quarter**

- No scoring plays.

**Fourth quarter**

- KC – Kareem Hunt 69-yard run (Cairo Santos kick), 1:49. Chiefs 24–10. **Drive: 4 plays, 80 yards, 1:16.**

**Top passers**

- KC – Alex Smith – 16/21, 155 yards, 2 TD
- LAC – Philip Rivers – 20/40, 237 yards, 3 INT

**Top rushers**

- KC – Kareem Hunt – 17 rushes, 172 yards, TD
- LAC – Melvin Gordon – 17 rushes, 79 yards, TD

**Top receivers**

- KC – Tyreek Hill – 5 receptions, 77 yards, TD
- LAC – Travis Benjamin – 5 receptions, 105 yards

==== Week 4: vs. Washington Redskins ====
Week 4: Washington Redskins at Kansas City Chiefs – Game summary

Quarter	1	2	3	4	Total
Redskins	10	0	7	3	**20**
**Chiefs**	0	7	10	12	**29**

at Arrowhead Stadium, Kansas City, Missouri

- Date: October 2
- Game time: 7:30 p.m. CDT
- Game weather: Clear, 82 °F (28 °C)
- Game attendance: 74,587
- Referee: Walt Coleman
- TV announcers (ESPN): Sean McDonough, Jon Gruden and Lisa Salters
- Recap, Game Book

Game information

**First quarter**

- WAS – Terrelle Pryor 44-yard pass from Kirk Cousins (Dustin Hopkins kick), 12:00. Redskins 7–0. **Drive: 6 plays, 75 yards, 3:08.**
- WAS – Dustin Hopkins 19-yard field goal, 2:50. Redskins 10–0. **Drive: 14 plays, 50 yards, 7:39.**

**Second quarter**

- KC – Travis Kelce 17-yard pass from Alex Smith (Harrison Butker kick), 2:00. Redskins 10–7. **Drive: 7 plays, 73 yards, 3:07.**

**Third quarter**

- KC – Alex Smith 1-yard run (Harrison Butker kick), 9:24. Chiefs 14–10. **Drive: 10 plays, 79 yards, 5:40.**
- WAS – Ryan Grant 3-yard pass from Kirk Cousins (Dustin Hopkins kick), 7:47. Redskins 17–14. **Drive: 3 plays, 75 yards, 1:38.**
- KC – Harrison Butker 26-yard field goal, 0:04. Tied 17–17. **Drive: 13 plays, 68 yards, 7:41.**

**Fourth quarter**

- KC – Harrison Butker 32-yard field goal, 4:55. Chiefs 20–17. **Drive: 14 plays, 66 yards, 8:10.**
- WAS – Dustin Hopkins 40-yard field goal, 0:50. Tied 20–20. **Drive: 10 plays, 53 yards, 4:04.**
- KC – Harrison Butker 43-yard field goal, 0:08. Chiefs 23–20. **Drive: 6 plays, 50 yards, 0:43.**
- KC – Justin Houston 13-yard fumble return (run failed), 0:04. Chiefs 29–20.

**Top passers**

- WAS – Kirk Cousins – 14/24, 220 yards, 2 TD
- KC – Alex Smith – 27/37, 293 yards, TD

**Top rushers**

- WAS – Kirk Cousins – 7 rushes, 38 yards
- KC – Kareem Hunt – 21 rushes, 101 yards

**Top receivers**

- WAS – Vernon Davis – 2 receptions, 89 yards
- KC – Travis Kelce – 7 receptions, 111 yards, TD

==== Week 5: at Houston Texans ====
Week 5: Kansas City Chiefs at Houston Texans – Game summary

Quarter	1	2	3	4	Total
**Chiefs**	3	20	0	19	**42**
Texans	0	7	6	21	**34**

at NRG Stadium, Houston, Texas

- Date: October 8
- Game time: 7:30 p.m. CDT
- Game weather: None (retractable roof closed)
- Game attendance: 71,835
- Referee: Ronald Torbert
- TV announcers (NBC): Al Michaels, Cris Collinsworth and Michele Tafoya
- Recap, Game Book

Game information

**First quarter**

- KC – Harrison Butker 35-yard field goal, 6:57. Chiefs 3–0. **Drive: 15 plays, 64 yards, 8:07.**

**Second quarter**

- KC – Harrison Butker 42-yard field goal, 11:28. Chiefs 6–0. **Drive: 11 plays, 65 yards, 6:21.**
- KC – Charcandrick West 8-yard pass from Alex Smith (Harrison Butker kick), 5:45. Chiefs 13–0. **Drive: 8 plays, 62 yards, 4:52.**
- KC – Harrison Butker 41-yard field goal, 4:21. Chiefs 16–0. **Drive: 4 plays, 3 yards, 0:51.**
- HOU – DeAndre Hopkins 6-yard pass from Deshaun Watson (Kaʻimi Fairbairn kick), 1:49. Chiefs 16–7. **Drive: 8 plays, 75 yards, 2:28.**
- KC – Charcandrick West 4-yard pass from Alex Smith (Harrison Butker kick), 0:34. Chiefs 23–7. **Drive: 7 plays, 75 yards, 1:15.**

**Third quarter**

- HOU – Will Fuller 9-yard pass from Deshaun Watson (pass failed), 3:20. Chiefs 23–13. **Drive: 7 plays, 78 yards, 3:58.**

**Fourth quarter**

- KC – Harrison Butker 35-yard field goal, 14:05. Chiefs 26–13. **Drive: 10 plays, 58 yards, 4:15.**
- HOU – Will Fuller 48-yard pass from Deshaun Watson (Kaʻimi Fairbairn kick), 12:00. Chiefs 26–20. **Drive: 5 plays, 70 yards, 2:01.**
- KC – De'Anthony Thomas 10-yard pass from Alex Smith (pass failed), 8:57. Chiefs 32–20. **Drive: 6 plays, 70 yards, 3:03.**
- KC – Tyreek Hill 82-yard punt return (Harrison Butker kick), 7:22. Chiefs 39–20.
- HOU – DeAndre Hopkins 34-yard pass from Deshaun Watson (pass failed), 3:05. Chiefs 39–26. **Drive: 3 plays, 37 yards, 0:16.**
- KC – Harrison Butker 49-yard field goal, 1:13. Chiefs 42–26. **Drive: 4 plays, 5 yards, 1:49.**
- HOU – DeAndre Hopkins 1-yard pass from Deshaun Watson (Deshaun Watson run), 0:00. Chiefs 42–34. **Drive: 7 plays, 75 yards, 1:08.**

**Top passers**

- KC – Alex Smith – 29/37, 324 yards, 3 TD
- HOU – Deshaun Watson – 16/31, 261 yards, 5 TD

**Top rushers**

- KC – Kareem Hunt – 29 rushes, 107 yards
- HOU – Lamar Miller – 15 rushes, 74 yards

**Top receivers**

- KC – Travis Kelce – 8 receptions, 98 yards
- HOU – Stephen Anderson – 2 receptions, 63 yards

==== Week 6: vs. Pittsburgh Steelers ====
Week 6: Pittsburgh Steelers at Kansas City Chiefs – Game summary

Quarter	1	2	3	4	Total
**Steelers**	2	10	0	7	**19**
Chiefs	3	0	0	10	**13**

at Arrowhead Stadium, Kansas City, Missouri

- Date: October 15
- Game time: 3:25 p.m. CDT
- Game weather: Sunny, 60 °F (16 °C)
- Game attendance: 76,994
- Referee: Carl Cheffers
- TV announcers (CBS): Jim Nantz, Tony Romo and Tracy Wolfson
- Recap, Game Book

Game information

**First quarter**

- PIT – Zach Fulton fumble out of bounds in end zone for a Safety, 7:49. Steelers 2–0.
- KC – Harrison Butker 46-yard field goal, 6:20. Chiefs 3–2. **Drive: 4 plays, 4 yards, 1:29.**

**Second quarter**

- PIT – Le'Veon Bell 3-yard run (Chris Boswell kick), 14:55. Steelers 9–3. **Drive: 12 plays, 75 yards, 6:25.**
- PIT – Chris Boswell 24-yard field goal, 2:08. Steelers 12–3. **Drive: 12 plays, 93 yards, 6:43.**

**Third quarter**

- No scoring plays.

**Fourth quarter**

- KC – De'Anthony Thomas 57-yard pass from Alex Smith (Harrison Butker kick), 6:13. Steelers 12–10. **Drive: 8 plays, 82 yards, 2:50.**
- PIT – Antonio Brown 51-yard pass from Ben Roethlisberger (Chris Boswell kick), 3:24. Steelers 19–10. **Drive: 5 plays, 75 yards, 2:49.**
- KC – Harrison Butker 33-yard field goal, 2:17. Steelers 19–13. **Drive: 6 plays, 52 yards, 1:07.**

**Top passers**

- PIT – Ben Roethlisberger – 17/25, 252 yards, TD, INT
- KC – Alex Smith – 19/34, 246 yards, TD

**Top rushers**

- PIT – Le'Veon Bell – 32 rushes, 179 yards, TD
- KC – Kareem Hunt – 9 rushes, 21 yards

**Top receivers**

- PIT – Antonio Brown – 8 receptions, 155 yards, TD
- KC – Kareem Hunt – 5 receptions, 89 yards

==== Week 7: at Oakland Raiders ====
Week 7: Kansas City Chiefs at Oakland Raiders – Game summary

Quarter	1	2	3	4	Total
Chiefs	10	10	10	0	**30**
**Raiders**	14	0	7	10	**31**

at Oakland–Alameda County Coliseum, Oakland, California

- Date: October 19
- Game time: 7:25 p.m. CDT/5:25 p.m. PDT
- Game weather: Cloudy, 62 °F (17 °C)
- Game attendance: 55,090
- Referee: Craig Wrolstad
- TV announcers (CBS/NFLN/Amazon Video): Jim Nantz, Tony Romo, Tracy Wolfson and Jay Feely
- Recap, Game Book

Game information

**First quarter**

- KC – Harrison Butker 53-yard field goal. 10:14. Chiefs 3–0. **Drive: 10 plays, 40 yards, 4:46.**
- OAK – Amari Cooper 38-yard pass from Derek Carr (Giorgio Tavecchio kick), 8:11. Raiders 7–3. **Drive: 4 plays, 75 yards, 2:03.**
- KC – Travis Kelce 10-yard pass from Alex Smith (Harrison Butker kick), 7:17. Chiefs 10–7. **Drive: 7 plays, 82 yards, 3:54.**
- OAK – Amari Cooper 45-yard pass from Derk Carr (Giorgio Tavecchio kick), 0:40. Raiders 14–10. **Drive: 8 plays, 75 yards, 3:54.**

**Second quarter**

- KC – Tyreek Hill 64-yard pass from Alex Smith (Harrison Butker kick), 8:51. Chiefs 17–14. 'Drive: 3 plays, 99 yards, 1:32.
- KC – Harrison Butker 39-yard field goal, 1:06. Chiefs 20–14. **Drive: 10 plays, 26 yards, 3:45.**

**Third quarter**

- OAK – DeAndré Washington 4-yard run (Giorgio Tavecchio kick), 10:41. Raiders 21–20. **Drive: 8 plays, 85 yards, 4:15.**
- KC – Albert Wilson 63-yard pass from Alex Smith (Harrison Butker kick), 7:08. Chiefs 27–21. **Drive: 6 plays, 75 yards, 3:37.**
- KC – Harrison Butker 37-yard field goal, 0:47. Chiefs 30–21. **Drive: 11 plays, 55 yards, 4:15.**

**Fourth quarter**

- OAK – Giorgio Tavecchio 26-yard field goal, 11:53. Chiefs 30–24. **Drive: 12 plays, 67 yards, 3:54.**
- OAK – Michael Crabtree 2-yard pass from Derek Carr (Giorgio Tevecchio kick), 0:00. Raiders 31–30. **Drive: 11 plays, 85 yards, 2:25.**

**Top passers**

- KC – Alex Smith – 25/36, 342 yards, 3 TD
- OAK – Derek Carr – 29/52, 417 yards, 3 TD

**Top rushers**

- KC – Kareem Hunt – 18 rushes, 87 yards
- OAK – DeAndré Washington – 9 rushes, 33 yards, TD

**Top receivers**

- KC – Tyreek Hill – 6 receptions, 125 yards, TD
- OAK – Amari Cooper – 11 receptions, 210 yards, 2 TD

The Raiders scored the game-winning touchdown after multiple holding penalties on Kansas City forced several untimed downs after time expired. The game would be the Chiefs' last loss in Oakland and last road loss to a division opponent until Week 8 of the 2023 season.

==== Week 8: vs. Denver Broncos ====
Week 8: Denver Broncos at Kansas City Chiefs – Game summary

Quarter	1	2	3	4	Total
Broncos	0	3	10	6	**19**
**Chiefs**	14	3	3	9	**29**

at Arrowhead Stadium, Kansas City, Missouri

- Date: October 30
- Game time: 7:30 p.m. CDT
- Game weather: Clear, 44 °F (7 °C)
- Game attendance: 76,573
- Referee: Tony Corrente
- TV announcers (ESPN): Sean McDonough, Jon Gruden and Lisa Salters
- Recap, Game Book

Game information

**First quarter**

- KC – Marcus Peters 45-yard fumble return (Harrison Butker kick), 9:29. Chiefs 7–0.
- KC – Travis Kelce 29-yard pass from Alex Smith (Harrison Butker kick), 6:11. Chiefs 14–0. **Drive: 5 plays, 68 yards, 1:39.**

**Second quarter**

- DEN – Brandon McManus 27-yard field goal, 11:48. Chiefs 14–3. **Drive: 13 plays, 71 yards, 7:07.**
- KC – Harrison Butker 25-yard field goal, 5:02. Chiefs 17–3. **Drive: 7 plays, 47 yards, 4:05.**

**Third quarter**

- KC – Harrison Butker 32-yard field goal, 12:30. Chiefs 20–3. **Drive: 4 plays, 2 yards, 0:54.**
- DEN – Brandon McManus 34-yard field goal, 8:11. Chiefs 20–6. **Drive: 9 plays, 60 yards, 4:19.**
- DEN – Devontae Booker 6-yard run (Brandon McManus kick), 1:14. Chiefs 20–13. **Drive: 10 plays, 80 yards, 5:44.**

**Fourth quarter**

- KC – Harrison Butker 43-yard field goal, 12:30. Chiefs 23–13. **Drive: 8 plays, 50 yards, 3:44.**
- KC – Harrison Butker 51-yard field goal, 7:03. Chiefs 26–13. **Drive: 6 plays, 15 yards, 3:03.**
- KC – Harrison Butker 42-yard field goal, 4:41. Chiefs 29–13. **Drive: 4 plays, –2 yards, 1:42.**
- DEN – A. J. Derby 11-yard pass from Trevor Siemian (pass failed), 1:55. Chiefs 29–19. **Drive: 10 plays, 75 yards, 2:46.**

**Top passers**

- DEN – Trevor Siemian – 19/36, 198 yards, TD, 3 INT
- KC – Alex Smith – 14/31, 202 yards, TD

**Top rushers**

- DEN – C. J. Anderson – 15 rushes, 78 yards
- KC – Kareem Hunt – 22 rushes, 46 yards

**Top receivers**

- DEN – Demaryius Thomas – 5 receptions, 66 yards
- KC – Travis Kelce – 7 receptions, 133 yards, TD

During halftime, Carlos Carson was inducted into the Chiefs Ring of Honor.

==== Week 9: at Dallas Cowboys ====
Week 9: Kansas City Chiefs at Dallas Cowboys – Game summary

Quarter	1	2	3	4	Total
Chiefs	0	10	7	0	**17**
**Cowboys**	7	7	7	7	**28**

at AT&T Stadium, Arlington, Texas

- Date: November 5
- Game time: 3:25 p.m. CST
- Game weather: None (retractable roof closed)
- Game attendance: 93,273
- Referee: Pete Morelli
- TV announcers (CBS): Jim Nantz, Tony Romo and Tracy Wolfson
- Recap, Game Book

Game information

**First quarter**

- DAL – Cole Beasley 6-yard pass from Dak Prescott (Mike Nugent kick), 2:42. Cowboys 7–0. **Drive: 7 plays, 61 yards, 3:58.**

**Second quarter**

- KC – Harrison Butker 38-yard field goal, 7:24. Cowboys 7–3. **Drive: 9 plays, 44 yards, 5:08.**
- DAL – Dak Prescott 10-yard run (Mike Nugent kick), 0:21. Cowboys 14–3. **Drive: 7 plays, 82 yards, 1:31.**
- KC – Tyreek Hill 56-yard pass from Alex Smith (Harrison Butker kick), 0:02. Cowboys 14–10. **Drive: 2 plays, 63 yards, 0:13.**

**Third quarter**

- KC – Travis Kelce 2-yard pass from Alex Smith (Harrison Butker kick), 9:11. Chiefs 17-14. **Drive: 9 plays, 62 yards, 5:54.**
- DAL – Ezekiel Elliott 2-yard run (Mike Nugent kick), 3:33. Cowboys 21–17. **Drive: 12 plays, 75 yards, 5:37.**

**Fourth quarter**

- DAL – Cole Beasley 7-yard pass from Dak Prescott (Mike Nugent kick), 9:02. Cowboys 28–17. **Drive: 13 plays, 87 yards, 6:46.**

**Top passers**

- KC – Alex Smith – 25/34, 263 yards, 2 TD, INT
- DAL – Dak Prescott – 21/33, 249 yards, 2 TD

**Top rushers**

- KC – Kareem Hunt – 9 rushes, 37 yards
- DAL – Ezekiel Elliott – 27 rushes, 93 yards, TD

**Top receivers**

- KC – Travis Kelce – 7 receptions, 73 yards, TD
- DAL – Terrance Williams – 9 receptions, 141 yards

This was the last time the Chiefs lost a game by more than 8 points until Super Bowl LV.

==== Week 11: at New York Giants ====
Week 11: Kansas City Chiefs at New York Giants – Game summary

Quarter	1	2	3	4	OT	Total
Chiefs	0	3	0	6	0	**9**
**Giants**	0	6	0	3	3	**12**

at MetLife Stadium, East Rutherford, New Jersey

- Date: November 19
- Game time: 1:00 p.m. EST/12:00 p.m. CST
- Game weather: Mostly cloudy, 50 °F (10 °C)
- Game attendance: 76,363
- Referee: Brad Allen
- TV announcers (CBS): Ian Eagle, Dan Fouts and Evan Washburn
- Recap, Game Book

Game information

**First quarter**

- No scoring plays.

**Second quarter**

- NYG – Orleans Darkwa 1-yard run (kick failed, wide right), 13:26. Giants 6–0. **Drive: 6 plays, 26 yards, 2:17.**
- KC – Harrison Butker 31-yard field goal, 4:09. Giants 6–3. **Drive: 15 plays, 61 yards, 9:17.**

**Third quarter**

- No scoring plays.

**Fourth quarter**

- KC – Harrison Butker 31-yard field goal, 13:30. Tied 6–6. **Drive: 7 plays, 54 yards, 3:05.**
- NYG – Aldrick Rosas 26-yard field goal, 1:38. Giants 9–6. **Drive: 5 plays, 15 yards, 0:29.**
- KC – Harrison Butker 23-yard field goal, 0:01. Tied 9–9. **Drive: 9 plays, 69 yards, 1:37.**

**Overtime**

- NYG – Aldrick Rosas 23-yard field goal, 1:54. Giants 12–9. **Drive: 10 plays, 77 yards, 4:00.**

**Top passers**

- KC – Alex Smith – 27/40, 230 yards, 2 INT
- NYG – Eli Manning – 19/35, 205 yards

**Top rushers**

- KC – Kareem Hunt – 18 rushes, 73 yards
- NYG – Orleans Darkwa – 20 rushes, 74 yards, TD

**Top receivers**

- KC – Travis Kelce – 8 receptions, 109 yards
- NYG – Roger Lewis – 5 receptions, 55 yards

==== Week 12: vs. Buffalo Bills ====
Week 12: Buffalo Bills at Kansas City Chiefs – Game summary

Quarter	1	2	3	4	Total
**Bills**	7	6	3	0	**16**
Chiefs	0	3	7	0	**10**

at Arrowhead Stadium, Kansas City, Missouri

- Date: November 26
- Game time: 12:00 p.m. CST
- Game weather: Partly cloudy, 62 °F (17 °C)
- Game attendance: 74,929
- Referee: Bill Vinovich
- TV announcers (CBS): Greg Gumbel, Trent Green and Jamie Erdahl
- Recap, Game Book

Game information

**First quarter**

- BUF – Zay Jones 11-yard pass from Tyrod Taylor (Stephen Hauschka kick), 1:29. Bills 7–0. **Drive: 9 plays, 58 yards, 4:24.**

**Second quarter**

- BUF – Stephen Hauschka 34-yard field goal, 12:01. Bills 10–0. **Drive: 6 plays, 28 yards, 2:50.**
- KC – Harrison Butker 45-yard field goal, 1:44. Bills 10–3. **Drive: 5 plays, 32 yards, 1:46.**
- BUF – Stephen Hauschka 56-yard field goal, 0:04. Bills 13–3. **Drive: 8 plays, 38 yards, 1:40.**

**Third quarter**

- KC – Albert Wilson 19-yard pass from Alex Smith (Harrison Butker kick), 9:19. Bills 13–10. **Drive: 9 plays, 85 yards, 5:41.**
- BUF – Stephen Hauschka 49-yard field goal, 6:52. Bills 16–10. **Drive: 5 plays, 44 yards, 2:27.**

**Fourth quarter**

- No scoring plays.

**Top passers**

- BUF – Tyrod Taylor – 19/29, 183 yards, TD
- KC – Alex Smith – 23/36, 199 yards, TD, INT

**Top rushers**

- BUF – LeSean McCoy – 22 rushes, 49 yards
- KC – Alex Smith – 5 rushes, 35 yards

**Top receivers**

- BUF – Charles Clay – 4 receptions, 60 yards
- KC – Tyreek Hill – 7 receptions, 41 yards

==== Week 13: at New York Jets ====
Week 13: Kansas City Chiefs at New York Jets – Game summary

Quarter	1	2	3	4	Total
Chiefs	14	3	7	7	**31**
**Jets**	14	7	6	11	**38**

at MetLife Stadium, East Rutherford, New Jersey

- Date: December 3
- Game time: 1:00 p.m. EST/12:00 p.m. CST
- Game weather: Cloudy, 48 °F (9 °C)
- Game attendance: 77,562
- Referee: John Parry
- TV announcers (CBS): Ian Eagle, Dan Fouts and Evan Washburn
- Recap, Game Book

Game information

**First quarter**

- KC – Travis Kelce 22-yard pass from Alex Smith (Harrison Butker kick), 12:22. Chiefs 7–0. **Drive: 5 plays, 75 yards, 2:38.**
- KC – Travis Kelce 36-yard pass from Alex Smith (Harrison Butker kick), 10:36. Chiefs 14–0. **Drive: 1 plays, 36 yards, 0:06.**
- NYJ – Bilal Powell 1-yard run (Chandler Catanzaro kick), 6:10. Chiefs 14–7. **Drive: 9 plays, 75 yards, 4:26.**
- NYJ – Josh McCown 1-yard run (Chandler Catanzaro kick), 0:46. Tied 14–14. **Drive: 8 plays, 68 yards, 5:02.**

**Second quarter**

- KC – Harrison Butker 36-yard field goal, 2:49. Chiefs 17–14. **Drive: 6 plays, 68 yards, 2:45.**
- NYJ – Matt Forte 11-yard pass from Josh McCown (Chandler Catanzaro kick), 0:23. Jets 21–17. **Drive: 10 plays, 75 yards, 2:26.**

**Third quarter**

- NYJ – Chandler Catanzaro 27-yard field goal, 5:29. Jets 24–17. **Drive: 18 plays, 72 yards, 9:31.**
- KC – Tyreek Hill 79-yard pass from Alex Smith (Harrison Butker kick), 5:13. Tied 24–24. **Drive: 1 plays, 79 yards, 0:16.**
- NYJ – Chandler Catanzaro 47-yard field goal, 3:27. Jets 27–24. **Drive: 5 plays, 46 yards, 1:46.**

**Fourth quarter**

- NYJ – Chandler Catanzaro 38-yard field goal, 11:23. Jets 30–24. **Drive: 11 plays, 58 yards, 5:26.**
- KC – Tyreek Hill 40-yard pass from Alex Smith (Harrison Butker kick), 9:13. Chiefs 31–30. **Drive: 5 plays, 69 yards, 2:10.**
- NYJ – Josh McCown 1-yard run (Elijah McGuire run), 2:15. Jets 38–31. **Drive: 14 plays, 75 yards, 6:58.**

**Top passers**

- KC – Alex Smith – 19/33, 366 yards, 4 TD
- NYJ – Josh McCown – 26/36, 331 yards, TD

**Top rushers**

- KC – Alex Smith – 1 rush, 70 yards
- NYJ – Matt Forte – 15 rushes, 58 yards

**Top receivers**

- KC – Tyreek Hill – 6 receptions, 185 yards, 2 TD
- NYJ – Jermaine Kearse – 9 receptions, 157 yards

==== Week 14: vs. Oakland Raiders ====
Week 14: Oakland Raiders at Kansas City Chiefs – Game summary

Quarter	1	2	3	4	Total
Raiders	0	0	0	15	**15**
**Chiefs**	3	13	10	0	**26**

at Arrowhead Stadium, Kansas City, Missouri

- Date: December 10
- Game time: 12:00 p.m. CST
- Game weather: Sunny, 46 °F (8 °C)
- Game attendance: 74,461
- Referee: Carl Cheffers
- TV announcers (CBS): Kevin Harlan and Rich Gannon
- Recap, Game Book

Game information

**First quarter**

- KC – Harrison Butker 53-yard field goal, 9:22. Chiefs 3–0. **Drive: 8 plays, 23 yards, 4:07.**

**Second quarter**

- KC – Kareem Hunt 1-yard run (Harrison Butker kick), 14:57. Chiefs 10–0. **Drive: 14 plays, 86 yards, 7:03.**
- KC – Harrison Butker 29-yard field goal, 10:48. Chiefs 13–0. **Drive: 7 plays, 52 yards, 2:31.**
- KC – Harrison Butker 33-yard field goal, 1:41. Chiefs 16–0. **Drive: 9 plays, 61 yards, 4:51.**

**Third quarter**

- KC – Harrison Butker 40-yard field goal, 11:01. Chiefs 19–0. **Drive: 9 plays, 53 yards, 3:59.**
- KC – Charcandrick West 13-yard run (Harrison Butker kick), 3:22. Chiefs 26–0. **Drive: 4 plays, 38 yards, 1:51.**

**Fourth quarter**

- OAK – Marshawn Lynch 22-yard run (Giorgio Tavecchio kick), 8:51. Chiefs 26–7. **Drive: 6 plays, 67 yards, 2:28.**
- OAK – Jared Cook 29-yard pass from Derek Carr (Derek Carr–Michael Crabtree pass), 7:09. Chiefs 26–15. **Drive: 4 plays, 43 yards, 1:42.**

**Top passers**

- OAK – Derek Carr – 24/41, 211 yards, TD, 2 INT
- KC – Alex Smith – 20/34, 268 yards, INT

**Top rushers**

- OAK – Marshawn Lynch – 7 rushes, 61 yards, TD
- KC – Kareem Hunt – 25 rushes, 116 yards, TD

**Top receivers**

- OAK – Michael Crabtree – 7 receptions, 60 yards
- KC – Travis Kelce – 7 receptions, 74 yards

==== Week 15: vs. Los Angeles Chargers ====
Week 15: Los Angeles Chargers at Kansas City Chiefs – Game summary

Quarter	1	2	3	4	Total
Chargers	0	6	7	0	**13**
**Chiefs**	3	7	10	10	**30**

at Arrowhead Stadium, Kansas City, Missouri

- Date: December 16
- Game time: 7:25 p.m. CST
- Game weather: Cloudy, 53 °F (12 °C)
- Game attendance: 75,011
- Referee: Walt Anderson
- TV announcers (NFLN): Greg Gumbel, Trent Green and Jamie Erdahl
- Recap, Game Book

Game information

**First quarter**

- KC – Harrison Butker 31-yard field goal, 0:01. Chiefs 3–0. **Drive: 15 plays, 82 yards, 8:55.**

**Second quarter**

- KC – Tyreek Hill 64-yard pass from Alex Smith (Harrison Butker kick), 6:39. Chiefs 10–0. **Drive: 4 plays, 80 yards, 1:50.**
- LAC – Melvin Gordon 2-yard run (kick failed, wide left), 2:05. Chiefs 10–6. **Drive: 10 plays, 75 yards, 4:30.**

**Third quarter**

- LAC – Antonio Gates 10-yard pass from Philip Rivers (Travis Coons kick), 9:26. Chargers 13–10. **Drive: 6 plays, 88 yards, 3:27.**
- KC – Kareem Hunt 3-yard pass from Alex Smith (Harrison Butker kick), 2:14. Chiefs 17–13. **Drive: 12 plays, 69 yards, 7:13.**
- KC – Harrison Butker 24-yard field goal, 0:31. Chiefs 20–13. **Drive: 4 plays, 0 yards, 1:12.**

**Fourth quarter**

- KC – Harrison Butker 51-yard field goal, 11:04. Chiefs 23–13. **Drive: 6 plays, 23 yards, 3:28.**
- KC – Kareem Hunt 5-yard run (Harrison Butker kick), 4:01. Chiefs 30–13. **Drive: 7 plays, 65 yards, 4:26.**

**Top passers**

- LAC – Philip Rivers – 20/36, 227 yards, TD, 3 INT
- KC – Alex Smith – 23/30, 231 yards, 2 TD

**Top rushers**

- LAC – Melvin Gordon – 19 rushes, 78 yards, TD
- KC – Kareem Hunt – 24 rushes, 155 yards, TD

**Top receivers**

- LAC – Melvin Gordon – 6 receptions, 91 yards
- KC – Tyreek Hill – 5 receptions, 88 yards, TD

==== Week 16: vs. Miami Dolphins ====
Week 16: Miami Dolphins at Kansas City Chiefs – Game summary

Quarter	1	2	3	4	Total
Dolphins	3	10	0	0	**13**
**Chiefs**	3	17	3	6	**29**

at Arrowhead Stadium, Kansas City, Missouri

- Date: December 24
- Game time: 12:00 p.m. CST
- Game weather: Cloudy, 23 °F (−5 °C)
- Game attendance: 65,325
- Referee: Brad Allen
- TV announcers (CBS): Kevin Harlan, Rich Gannon and Jenny Dell
- Recap, Game Book

Game information

**First quarter**

- KC – Harrison Butker 31-yard field goal, 9:41. Chiefs 3–0. **Drive: 7 plays, 42 yards, 3:23.**
- MIA – Cody Parkey 44-yard field goal, 3:29. Tied 3–3. **Drive: 12 plays, 49 yards, 6:12.**

**Second quarter**

- KC – Travis Kelce 9-yard pass from Alex Smith (Harrison Butker kick), 13:00. Chiefs 10–3. **Drive: 9 plays, 75 yards, 5:29.**
- MIA – Cody Parkey 28-yard field goal, 8:11. Chiefs 10–6. **Drive: 9 plays, 65 yards, 4:49.**
- KC – Kareem Hunt 1-yard run (Harrison Butker kick), 3:37. Chiefs 17–6. **Drive: 9 plays, 68 yards, 4:34.**
- MIA – Jakeem Grant 65-yard pass from Jay Cutler (Cody Parkey kick), 3:22. Chiefs 17–13. **Drive: 1 plays, 65 yards, 0:15.**
- KC – Harrison Butker 32-yard field goal, 0:07. Chiefs 20–13. **Drive: 8 plays, 41 yards, 0:42.**

**Third quarter**

- KC – Harrison Butker 21-yard field goal, 10:24. Chiefs 23–13. **Drive: 8 plays, 61 yards, 4:36.**

**Fourth quarter**

- KC – Harrison Butker 29-yard field goal, 12:16. Chiefs 26–13. **Drive: 11 plays, 43 yards, 4:47.**
- KC – Harrison Butker 49-yard field goal, 3:41. Chiefs 29–13. **Drive: 10 plays, 31 yards, 6:18.**

**Top passers**

- MIA – Jay Cutler – 19/38, 286 yards, TD
- KC – Alex Smith – 25/39, 304 yards, TD

**Top rushers**

- MIA – Kenyan Drake – 13 rushes, 57 yards
- KC – Kareem Hunt – 29 rushes, 91 yards, TD

**Top receivers**

- MIA – Jakeem Grant – 4 receptions, 107 yards, TD
- KC – Tyreek Hill – 6 receptions, 109 yards

==== Week 17: at Denver Broncos ====
Week 17: Kansas City Chiefs at Denver Broncos – Game summary

Quarter	1	2	3	4	Total
**Chiefs**	7	7	10	3	**27**
Broncos	3	7	0	14	**24**

at Sports Authority Field at Mile High, Denver, Colorado

- Date: December 31
- Game time: 3:25 p.m. CST/2:25 p.m. MST
- Game weather: Cloudy, 17 °F (−8 °C)
- Game attendance: 75,928
- Referee: Clete Blakeman
- TV announcers (CBS): Beth Mowins and Jay Feely
- Recap, Game Book

Game information

**First quarter**

- KC – Kareem Hunt 35-yard run (Harrison Butker kick), 14:03. Chiefs 7–0. **Drive: 5 plays, 86 yards, 0:57.**
- DEN – Brandon McManus 36-yard field goal, 5:22. Chiefs 7–3. **Drive: 12 plays, 72 yards, 6:38.**

**Second quarter**

- DEN – De'Angelo Henderson 29-yard pass from Paxton Lynch (Brandon McManus kick), 4:56. Broncos 10–7. **Drive: 10 plays, 80 yards, 5:42.**
- KC – Anthony Sherman 1-yard run (Harrison Butker kick), 1:07. Chiefs 14–10. **Drive: 8 plays, 73 yards, 3:49.**

**Third quarter**

- KC – Harrison Butker 20-yard field goal, 3:58. Chiefs 17–10. **Drive: 18 plays, 90 yards, 8:46.**
- KC – Ramik Wilson 11-yard fumble return (Harrison Butker kick), 3:04. Chiefs 24–10.

**Fourth quarter**

- DEN – Zaire Anderson 38-yard fumble return (Brandon McManus kick), 6:52. Chiefs 24–17.
- DEN – Demaryius Thomas 6-yard pass from Paxton Lynch (Brandon McManus kick), 2:53. Tied 24–24. **Drive: 8 plays, 62 yards, 2:23.**
- KC – Harrison Butker 30-yard field goal, 0:00. Chiefs 27–24. **Drive: 11 plays, 67 yards, 2:53.**

**Top passers**

- KC – Patrick Mahomes – 22/35, 284 yards, INT
- DEN – Paxton Lynch – 21/31, 254 yards, 2 TD, 2 INT

**Top rushers**

- KC – Anthony Sherman – 14 rushes, 40 yards, TD
- DEN – C. J. Anderson – 18 rushes, 61 yards

**Top receivers**

- KC – Albert Wilson – 10 receptions, 147 yards
- DEN – Jordan Taylor – 6 receptions, 65 yards

This Week 17 game marked the start of Patrick Mahomes's journey as the Chiefs' star-rising quarterback, as fans saw the first glimpse of Mahomes' career in his first regular season game as an NFL quarterback. Though Mahomes did not play in the AFC Wild Card game, against the Tennessee Titans the week after, it was later announced that Mahomes would be the Chiefs' starting quarterback for the 2018 season, after Alex Smith was traded to the Washington Redskins, in exchange for cornerback Kendall Fuller. The Wild Card game was Alex Smith's last action as the Chiefs' starting quarterback, after spending four seasons with the team, since 2013, leading them to multiple playoff appearances.

=== Standings ===
==== Division ====
AFC West
	W	L	T	PCT	DIV	CONF	PF	PA	STK
^{(4)} Kansas City Chiefs	10	6	0	.625	5–1	8–4	415	339	W4
Los Angeles Chargers	9	7	0	.563	3–3	6–6	355	272	W2
Oakland Raiders	6	10	0	.375	2–4	5–7	301	373	L4
Denver Broncos	5	11	0	.313	2–4	4–8	289	382	L2

==== Conference ====
AFC
#	Team	Division	W	L	T	PCT	DIV	CONF	SOS	SOV	STK
**Division leaders**
1 (Note: New England claimed the No. 1 seed over Pittsburgh based on head-to-head victory.)	New England Patriots	East	13	3	0	.813	5–1	10–2	.484	.466	W3
2	Pittsburgh Steelers	North	13	3	0	.813	6–0	10–2	.453	.423	W2
3 (Note: Jacksonville claimed the No. 3 seed over Kansas City based on conference record.)	Jacksonville Jaguars	South	10	6	0	.625	4–2	9–3	.434	.394	L2
4	Kansas City Chiefs	West	10	6	0	.625	5–1	8–4	.477	.481	W4
**Wild Cards**
5 (Note: Tennessee finished ahead of Buffalo, Baltimore and Los Angeles Chargers based on conference record, claiming the No. 5 seed. Buffalo and Baltimore finished ahead of Los Angeles Chargers based on conference record. Buffalo claimed the No. 6 seed over Baltimore based on strength of victory.)	Tennessee Titans	South	9	7	0	.563	5–1	8–4	.434	.396	W1
6	Buffalo Bills	East	9	7	0	.563	3–3	7–5	.492	.396	W1
**Did not qualify for the postseason**
7	Baltimore Ravens	North	9	7	0	.563	3–3	7–5	.441	.299	L1
8	Los Angeles Chargers	West	9	7	0	.563	3–3	6–6	.457	.347	W2
9	Cincinnati Bengals	North	7	9	0	.438	3–3	6–6	.465	.321	W2
10 (Note: Oakland finished ahead of Miami based on head-to-head victory.)	Oakland Raiders	West	6	10	0	.375	2–4	5–7	.512	.396	L4
11	Miami Dolphins	East	6	10	0	.375	2–4	5–7	.543	.531	L3
12 (Note: Denver finished ahead of the New York Jets based on head-to-head victory.)	Denver Broncos	West	5	11	0	.313	2–4	4–8	.492	.413	L2
13	New York Jets	East	5	11	0	.313	2–4	5–7	.520	.438	L4
14 (Note: Indianapolis finished ahead of Houston based on head-to-head sweep.)	Indianapolis Colts	South	4	12	0	.250	2–4	3–9	.480	.219	W1
15	Houston Texans	South	4	12	0	.250	1–5	3–9	.516	.375	L6
16	Cleveland Browns	North	0	16	0	.000	0–6	0–12	.520	–	L16
**Tiebreakers** (Note: When breaking ties for three or more teams under the NFL's rules, they are first broken within divisions, then comparing only the highest ranked remaining team from each division.)

== Postseason ==
=== Schedule ===
Round	Date	Opponent (seed)	Result	Record	Venue	Recap
Wild Card	January 6	Tennessee Titans (5)	L 21–22	0–1	Arrowhead Stadium	Recap

=== Game summaries ===
==== AFC Wild Card Playoffs: vs. (5) Tennessee Titans ====
AFC Wild Card Playoffs: (5) Tennessee Titans at (4) Kansas City Chiefs – Game summary

Quarter	1	2	3	4	Total
Titans	0	3	7	12	22
Chiefs	14	7	0	0	21

at Arrowhead Stadium, Kansas City, Missouri

- Date: January 6, 2018
- Game time: 3:35 p.m. CST
- Game weather: Sunny, 33 °F (1 °C)
- Game attendance: 73,319
- Referee: Jeff Triplette
- TV announcers (ESPN/ABC): Sean McDonough, Jon Gruden and Lisa Salters
- Recap, Game Book

Game information

First quarter

- KC – Kareem Hunt 1-yard run (Harrison Butker kick), 7:07. Chiefs 7–0. Drive: 6 plays, 81 yards, 2:56.
- KC – Travis Kelce 13-yard pass from Alex Smith (Harrison Butker kick), 2:15. Chiefs 14–0. Drive: 5 plays, 76 yards, 3:24.

Second quarter

- TEN – Ryan Succop 49-yard field goal, 1:55. Chiefs 14–3. Drive: 8 plays, 48 yards, 4:02.
- KC – Demarcus Robinson 14-yard pass from Alex Smith (Harrison Butker kick), 0:03. Chiefs 21–3. Drive: 9 plays, 79 yards, 1:52.

Third quarter

- TEN – Marcus Mariota 6-yard pass from Marcus Mariota (Ryan Succop kick), 6:31. Chiefs 21–10. Drive: 15 plays, 91 yards, 8:29.

Fourth quarter

- TEN – Derrick Henry 35-yard run (pass failed), 14:08. Chiefs 21–16. Drive: 6 plays, 62 yards, 3:17.
- TEN – Eric Decker 22-yard pass from Marcus Mariota (pass failed), 6:06. Titans 22–21. Drive: 11 plays, 80 yards, 5:09.

Top passers

- TEN – Marcus Mariota – 19/31, 205 yards, 2 TD, INT
- KC – Alex Smith – 24/33, 264 yards, 2 TD

Top rushers

- TEN – Derrick Henry – 23 rushes, 156 yards, TD
- KC – Kareem Hunt – 11 rushes, 42 yards, TD

Top receivers

- TEN – Delanie Walker – 6 receptions, 74 yards
- KC – Tyreek Hill – 7 receptions, 87 yards

For the first round of the playoffs, the Chiefs played the Tennessee Titans at home. The Chiefs entered the game looking to win their first home playoff game since 1994, a streak of 5 straight home playoff losses. The Chiefs had a strong first half, building a 21–3 halftime lead and sending the home crowd into a frenzy. However, the Titans were able to catch fire, with a batted down touchdown pass from Marcus Mariota to himself, to make the score 21–10. The Chiefs were not able to recover after this touchdown, and the Titans outscored Kansas City 19–0 in the second half to win 22–21. The Chiefs, looked as though they had taken the lead on a fumble by Derrick Henry. However, the turnover was reviewed, and upon review, the call was overturned and Tennessee kept the ball. Henry was then able to run for a first down on third down to seal the game. With the loss, the Chiefs ended their season at 10–7 and lost 6 straight home playoff games, the worst in NFL history.
