= Marcus Harris (defensive tackle) =

American football player (born 2000)

No. 68 – Kansas City Chiefs
- Position: Defensive tackle
- Roster status: Active

Personal information
- Born: September 27, 2000 (age 26)
- Listed height: 6 ft 3 in (1.91 m)
- Listed weight: 295 lb (134 kg)

Career information
- High school: Park Crossing (Montgomery, Alabama)
- College: Kansas (2019–2020); Auburn (2021–2023)
- NFL draft: 2024: 7th round, 247th overall pick

Career history
- Houston Texans (2024)*; New England Patriots (2024)*; Buffalo Bills (2025)*; Houston Texans (2025)*; Kansas City Chiefs (2025–present)
- * Offseason or practice squad member only

Awards and highlights
- Second-team All-SEC (2023)
- Stats at Pro Football Reference

Marcus Harris (born September 27, 2000) is an American professional football defensive tackle for the Kansas City Chiefs of the National Football League (NFL). He played college football for the Kansas Jayhawks and the Auburn Tigers and was selected by the Houston Texans in the seventh round of the 2024 NFL draft.

== Early life ==
Harris attended high school at Park Crossing in Montgomery, Alabama. Coming out of high school, Harris was rated as a three-star recruit where he decided to commit to play college football for the Kansas Jayhawks.

== College career ==
=== Kansas ===
During, Harris's first year with the Jayhawks in 2019 he would play in two games before redshirting. During week three of the 2020 season, Harris made six tackles with three being for a loss. In the following week, Harris would notch two and half tackles for a loss against rival Kansas State. In 2020, Harris had a breakout year totaling 27 tackles with seven and a half being for a loss, a forced fumble, and a fumble recovery. After the conclusion of the 2020 season, Harris decided to enter the NCAA transfer portal.

=== Auburn ===
Harris decided to transfer to play for the Auburn Tigers. During the 2021 season, Harris notched 27 tackles, with six going for a loss, two sacks, and a fumble recovery which he returned for a touchdown. In 2022, Harris notched 30 tackles, with six and a half going for a loss, two sacks, and a pass deflection. During the 2023 season, Harris tallied 40 tackles with 11 going for a loss, seven sacks, and a forced fumble, where for his performance he was named first-team all-SEC. After the conclusion of the 2023 season, Harris decided to declare for the 2024 NFL draft.

Harris finished his career with the Auburn Tigers notching 97 tackles, with 23.5 being for a loss, and 11 sacks.

== Professional career ==
Pre-draft measurables
Height	Weight	Arm length	Hand span	Wingspan	40-yard dash	10-yard split	20-yard split	20-yard shuttle	Three-cone drill	Vertical jump	Broad jump	Bench press
6 ft 2 3/8 in (1.89 m)	286 lb (130 kg)	32 in (0.81 m)	9 5/8 in (0.24 m)	6 ft 6 1/4 in (1.99 m)	5.06 s	1.77 s	2.94 s	4.69 s	7.78 s	29.5 in (0.75 m)	8 ft 7 in (2.62 m)	34 reps
All values from NFL Combine/Pro Day

=== Houston Texans ===
Harris was selected by the Houston Texans in the seventh round (247th overall) of the 2024 NFL draft. He was waived on August 27, and re-signed to the practice squad. He was released on October 9.

=== New England Patriots ===
On October 11, 2024, Harris was signed to the New England Patriots' practice squad. He signed a reserve/future contract with New England on January 6, 2025. On April 28, Harris was released by the Patriots.

=== Buffalo Bills ===
On June 6, 2025, Harris signed with the Buffalo Bills. He was released on August 26 as part of final roster cuts.

=== Houston Texans (second stint) ===
On December 17, 2025, Harris was signed to the Houston Texans' practice squad. He was released on December 23.

=== Kansas City Chiefs ===
On December 30, 2025, Harris was signed to the Kansas City Chiefs' practice squad. He signed a reserve/future contract with the Chiefs on January 5, 2026.

On August 31, 2026, Harris was waived by the Chiefs; he was re-signed to the team's practice squad the following day. On September 14, Harris was elevated to the active roster ahead of the Week 1 game. On November 12, Harris was signed to the active roster.
