= Julian Wilson (American football) =

American football player and coach (born 1991)

Oklahoma State Cowboys
- Title: Cornerbacks coach

Personal information
- Born: October 25, 1991 (age 35); Oklahoma City, Oklahoma, U.S.
- Listed height: 6 ft 2 in (1.88 m)
- Listed weight: 200 lb (91 kg)

Career information
- High school: Moore (OK) Southmoore
- College: Oklahoma
- NFL draft: 2015: undrafted

Career history

Playing
- Baltimore Ravens (2015); Kansas City Chiefs (2016)*; Minnesota Vikings (2016)*; Kansas City Chiefs (2017)*; Calgary Stampeders (2017)
- * Offseason or practice squad member only

Coaching
- Texas Tech (2020–2021) Graduate assistant; Abilene Christian (2022–2023) Defensive backs coach; Sam Houston (2024) Defensive backs coach; North Texas (2025) Defensive backs coach; Oklahoma State (2026–present) Cornerbacks coach

Career CFL statistics
- Total tackles: 1
- Stats at CFL.ca
- Stats at Pro Football Reference

Julian Wilson (born October 25, 1991) is an American football coach and former cornerback who is currently the cornerbacks coach at the Oklahoma State University. He was previously a graduate assistant at Texas Tech University and the defensive backs coach at Abilene Christian University, Sam Houston State University and University of North Texas. He played college football at Oklahoma.

== Early life ==
Wilson was born in Oklahoma City, Oklahoma to Faye Wilson and Darrell McCowan, who was a two-year letterman in football at Oklahoma State in 1991–92. Wilson attended Southmoore High School in Moore, Oklahoma, where he was a two-sport athlete in football and track. He did not start playing football until his freshman year in high school. In 2008, he collected 43 tackles and broke up six passes on defense while recording 21 catches for 265 yards and three scores on offense, earning All-Region honors by PrepStar. As a senior in 2009, he defended seven of the top-10 receivers in Oklahoma 6A (playing teams like Del City, Mustang, Bartlesville and Lawton), and due to his cover abilities, many teams refused to throw his way. For his season efforts, Wilson was tabbed on the All-District team and was named All-State by The Oklahoman. He was also named to the All-Vype Football Team and was awarded the title of "Lockdown Defender" (award given to the best defender) at the 2009 Vype Showdown seven-on-seven passing league.

Wilson was also an heralded track sprinter. As a seventh and eighth grader, he did not lose a race in and he made it to the state finals as a freshman while at Westmoore. At a meet in Moore on April 9, 2009, Wilson ran a 10.4 to win the 100-meter dash and a 21.4 to win the 200-meter dash despite being hampered by a tight hamstring. Later in the season, Wilson ran a personal-best 10.2 in the 100-meter dash. At the John Jacobs Track Meet, he was part of a Southmoore 4x100-meter relay team that came up just short of a new state record as the Sabercats ran a 41.1. Following his senior season, Wilson was invited to perform at the 2009 Army All-American Combine held in San Antonio, Texas on January 5. Listed at 6'2", 172 lbs, he ended up running the third-fastest 40-yard dash among all participants with a 4.53 second sprint and completed the 20-yard shuttle in 4.28 seconds.

Considered a three-star recruit by Rivals.com, Wilson was rated among Oklahoma's top high school seniors as the state's 19th best player and was given a recruit ranking of 5.6. He was also viewed as a three-star recruit by Scout.com and a four-star recruit by ESPN.com. Wilson committed to Oklahoma on December 18, 2009.

== College career ==
Wilson attended the University of Oklahoma from 2011 to 2014, where he was a three-year letterwinner and a two-year starter at cornerback. He was redshirted as a true freshman in 2010. Wilson appeared in 48 career games with 22 starts during his career with the Sooners, collecting 99 tackles (76 of them solo and 6.5 for loss), four interceptions (one of which went for 100 yards as he returned it for a touchdown), and 15 pass deflections.

=== Freshman season (2011) ===
As a redshirt freshman in 2011, Wilson earned his first letter appearing in eleven games as a reserve safety and special teams player. Wilson was also an Academic All-Big 12 First-team.

=== Sophomore season (2012) ===
In his sophomore season, Wilson played in all 13 games with two starts, opening the contests at Texas Tech on October 6 and against Oklahoma State on November 24. He posted career highs in total tackles, solo stops, assisted tackles, tackles for loss and pass break-ups.

=== Junior season (2013) ===
Wilson played in all 13 games with starts in all contests except for the Sugar Bowl against Alabama and at Kansas on October 19. He was named to the Academic All-Big 12 first-team for the third straight season.

=== Senior season (2014) ===
As a senior in 2014, Wilson was an Academic All-Big 12 second-team honoree. He played in 11 of 13 games with starts at cornerback in the first nine contests of the season.

== Professional career ==
=== Pre-draft ===
External videos
- Wilson' NFL Combine workout

Pre-draft measurables
Height	Weight	Arm length	Hand span	40-yard dash	10-yard split	20-yard split	20-yard shuttle	Three-cone drill	Vertical jump	Broad jump	Bench press
6 ft 2 in (1.88 m)	205 lb (93 kg)	32 3/8 in (0.82 m)	9 1/4 in (0.23 m)	4.48 s	1.60 s	2.69 s	4.22 s	6.94 s	36 in (0.91 m)	10 ft 5 in (3.18 m)	15 reps
All values from NFL Combine except 40-yard dash and bench from pro day

Given his track and field background, Wilson ran a disappointing time in the 40-yard dash (4.58 seconds) at the 2015 NFL Combine, but improved that number at the Oklahoma Sooners' pro day on March 11, running in the 4.44 to 4.49 range. He also had 15 repetitions in the 225-bench press at his pro day.

=== Baltimore Ravens ===
After going undrafted in the 2015 NFL draft, Wilson signed with the Ravens as a rookie free agent on May 7, 2015. On the first day of rookie minicamp, Wilson fell awkwardly while in coverage and broke his leg, effectively ending his rookie season. After spending the 2015 season on the injured reserve list, the Ravens parted ways with Wilson on September 5, 2016.

=== Kansas City Chiefs ===
Wilson was signed to the Chiefs practice roster on September 7, 2016. Due to a need at other positions he was released September 11, 2016.

=== Minnesota Vikings ===
Following a knee injury to starting cornerback Xavier Rhodes, the Vikings signed Wilson to their practice squad on September 13, 2016. He was released by the team on September 27, 2016.

=== Kansas City Chiefs ===
On January 7, 2017, Wilson signed a reserve/future contract with the Chiefs. He was waived by the Chiefs on May 4, 2017.

== Career statistics ==
=== College ===
Regular season statistics				Tackles					Interceptions						Fumbles		
Season	Team	GP	GS	Comb	Total	Ast	Sck	Tfl	PDef	Int	Yds	Avg	Lng	TDs	FF	FR	FR YDS
2011	Oklahoma	11	0	2	1	1	0.0	0.0	0	0	0	0.0	0	0	0	0	0
2012	Oklahoma	13	2	32	23	9	0.0	2.0	5	0	0	0.0	0	0	0	0	0
2013	Oklahoma	13	11	26	20	6	0.0	4.5	3	3	0	0.0	0	0	0	0	0
2014	Oklahoma	11	9	39	32	7	0.0	0.0	7	1	100	100.0	100	1	0	0	0
Totals		48	22	99	76	23	0.0	6.5	15	4	100	25.0	100	1	0	0	0

== Coaching career ==
Wilson was named as defensive backs coach at Abilene Christian in January 2022. Wilson spent his previous two years as a graduate assistant on the staff at Texas Tech, where he worked primarily with the Red Raider secondary.

On February 15, 2024, Wilson was named as the defensive backs coach at Sam Houston.

On December 20, 2024, Wilson was named as the defensive backs coach at North Texas.

On December 15, 2025, Wilson was named the defensive backs coach at Oklahoma State.
