= James Winchester (American football) =

American football player (born 1989)

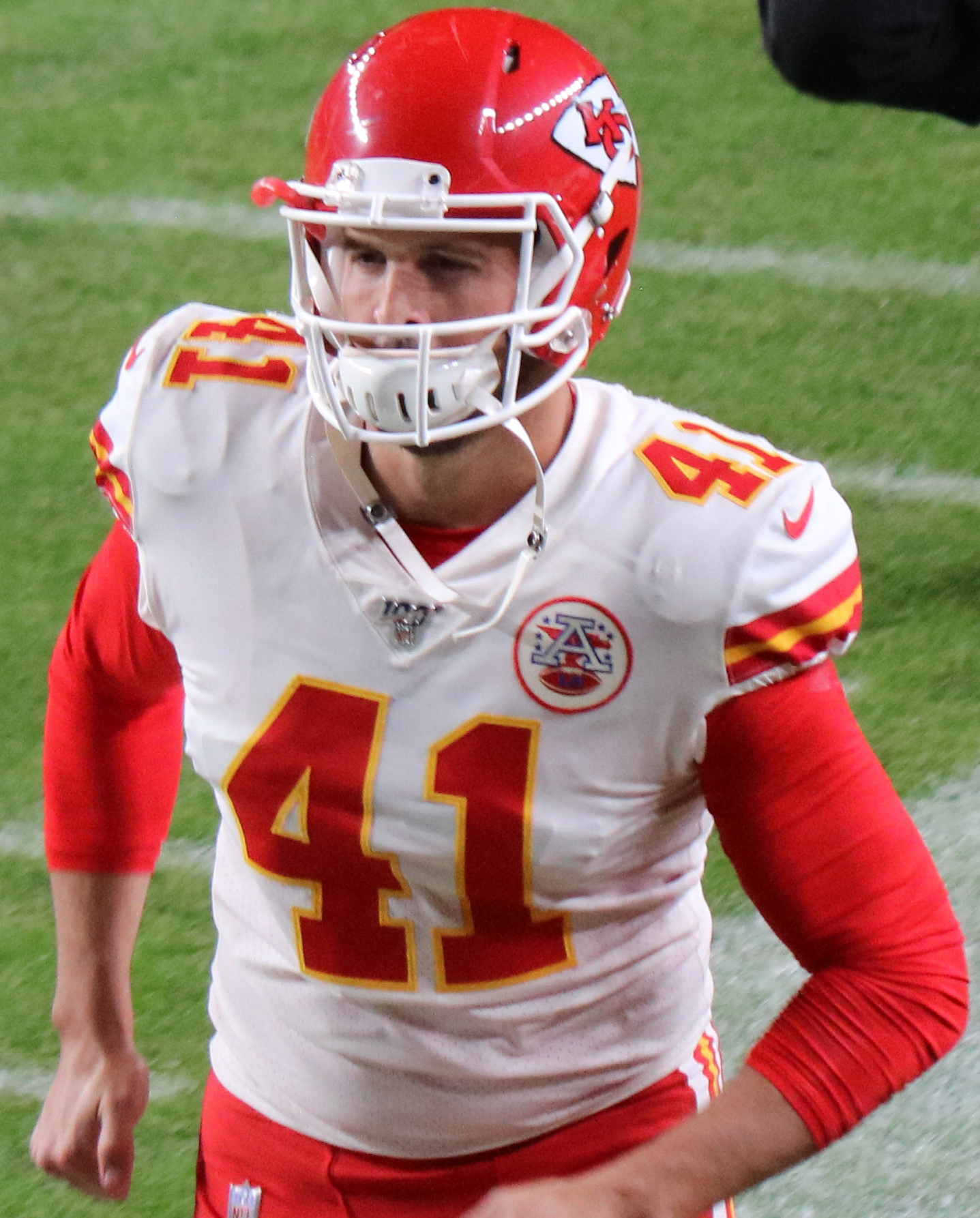
- Winchester with the Kansas City Chiefs in 2019

No. 41 – Kansas City Chiefs
- Position: Long snapper
- Roster status: Active

Personal information
- Born: August 6, 1989 (age 37); Washington, Oklahoma, U.S.
- Listed height: 6 ft 3 in (1.91 m)
- Listed weight: 240 lb (109 kg)

Career information
- High school: Washington
- College: Oklahoma (2008–2011)
- NFL draft: 2013: undrafted

Career history
- Philadelphia Eagles (2013)*; Kansas City Chiefs (2015–present)
- * Offseason or practice squad member only

Awards and highlights
- 3× Super Bowl champion (LIV, LVII, LVIII)

Career NFL statistics as of Week 8, 2026
- Games played: 188
- Total tackles: 18
- Forced fumbles: 2
- Fumble recoveries: 2
- Stats at Pro Football Reference

James Winchester (born August 6, 1989) is an American professional football long snapper for the Kansas City Chiefs of the National Football League (NFL). He played college football for the Oklahoma Sooners. A three-time Super Bowl champion, he has won Super Bowls LIV, LVII, and LVIII with the Chiefs.

== Professional career ==
Pre-draft measurables
| Height | Weight | 40-yard dash | 10-yard split | 20-yard split | 20-yard shuttle | Three-cone drill | Vertical jump | Broad jump | Bench press |
|---|---|---|---|---|---|---|---|---|---|
| 6 ft 3 1/4 in (1.91 m) | 210 lb (95 kg) | 4.58 s | 1.59 s | 2.67 s | 4.17 s | 7.04 s | 38.0 in (0.97 m) | 11 ft 5 in (3.48 m) | 15 reps |
All values from Pro Day

=== Philadelphia Eagles ===
Winchester signed with the Philadelphia Eagles as an undrafted free agent on August 11, 2013. He was released by the team on August 25 during the Eagles' first round of roster cutdowns.

=== Kansas City Chiefs ===
Winchester was signed by the Kansas City Chiefs on March 13, 2015. On January 23, 2017, Winchester signed a five-year, $4.45 million contract extension with the Chiefs.

On September 17, 2017, in Week 2 against the Philadelphia Eagles, Winchester forced a fumble on a Darren Sproles punt return. The fumble was recovered by teammate Anthony Sherman and helped set up a field goal scoring drive.

Winchester won Super Bowl LIV with the Chiefs after defeating the San Francisco 49ers 31–20.

On November 23, 2021, Winchester signed a two-year contract extension with the Chiefs through the 2023 season.

Winchester won his second Super Bowl when the Chiefs defeated the Philadelphia Eagles 38–35 in Super Bowl LVII.

Winchester won his third Super Bowl when the Chiefs defeated the San Francisco 49ers 25–22 in overtime in Super Bowl LVIII, giving him his second straight championship.

On March 11, 2024, the Chiefs re-signed Winchester to a one-year, $1.377 million extension. On March 10, 2025, Winchester re-signed with the Chiefs on a one-year, $1.65 million extension. On March 11, 2026, Winchester re-signed with the Chiefs on a one-year, $1.75 million contract.

== Personal life ==
Winchester is a Christian. He is married with three children. Winchester is a member of the Choctaw Nation of Oklahoma.

His father Michael, who was a punter at Oklahoma from 1984 to 1985, was killed in a shooting at Will Rogers World Airport in Oklahoma City on November 15, 2016.
