= Mark Donovan (American football) =

American football player and executive (born 1966)

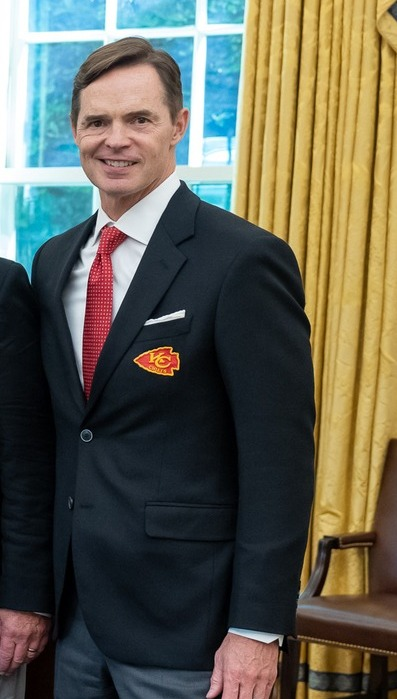
- Donovan in 2023

Kansas City Chiefs
- Title: President

Personal information
- Born: February 15, 1966 (age 60); Pittsburgh, Pennsylvania, U.S.

Career information
- Position: Quarterback
- College: Brown (1984–1987)
- NFL draft: 1988: undrafted

Career history

Playing
- New York Giants (1988)*
- * Offseason or practice squad member only

Operations
- National Hockey League (1997–1999) Director of sales & marketing; National Football League (1999–2003) Senior director of sales & marketing; Philadelphia Eagles (2003–2008) Senior vice president of business operations; Kansas City Chiefs (2009–2010) Chief operating officer; Kansas City Chiefs (2011–present) President

Awards and highlights
- As an executive: 3× Super Bowl champion (LIV, LVII, LVIII)

Mark Donovan (born February 15, 1966) is the team president of the Kansas City Chiefs. Donovan was born in Pittsburgh, Pennsylvania, and graduated from Brown University in 1988, where he was a quarterback and team captain. He completed 120 of 239 passes for 1,777 yards in the 1986 season and 61 of 143 for 747 yards in the 1987 season.

He signed as a free agent with the New York Giants. From 1997 to 1999 he was director of sales and marketing for the National Hockey League (NHL).

From 1999 to 2003 he was senior director marketing and sales for the National Football League (NFL). From 2003 to 2009 he was senior vice president/operations for the Philadelphia Eagles where he focused on bringing events to Lincoln Financial Field.

Donovan joined the Chiefs in 2009, becoming chief operating officer. In January 2011, he became president of the Chiefs. In the 2019 season, Donovan won his first Super Bowl when the Chiefs defeated the San Francisco 49ers 31–20 in Super Bowl LIV. In the 2022 season, Donovan won his second Super Bowl when the Chiefs defeated the Philadelphia Eagles 38–35 in Super Bowl LVII. In the 2023 season, Donovan won his third Super Bowl when the Chiefs defeated the San Francisco 49ers 25–22 in Super Bowl LVIII.
