= 2015 Kansas City Chiefs season =

NFL team season

- Owner: The Hunt family (Clark Hunt Chairman and CEO)
- General manager: John Dorsey
- Head coach: Andy Reid
- Offensive coordinator: Doug Pederson
- Defensive coordinator: Bob Sutton
- Home stadium: Arrowhead Stadium

Results
- Record: 11–5
- Division place: 2nd AFC West
- Playoffs: Won Wild Card Playoffs (at Texans) 30–0; Lost Divisional Playoffs (at Patriots) 20–27
- All-Pros: 3: S Eric Berry (1st team); LB Derrick Johnson (2nd team); CB Marcus Peters (2nd team)
- Pro Bowlers: 6: S Eric Berry; LB Tamba Hali; LB Justin Houston; LB Derrick Johnson; TE Travis Kelce; CB Marcus Peters
- Team MVP: Alex Smith, Eric Berry
- Team ROY: Marcus Peters

Uniform
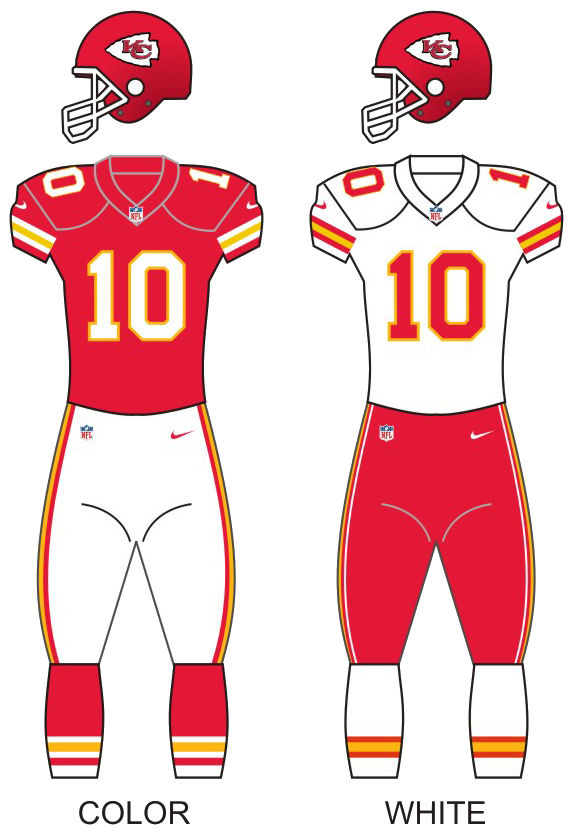

The 2015 season was the Kansas City Chiefs' 46th in the National Football League (NFL), their 56th overall and their third under the head coach/general manager tandem of Andy Reid and John Dorsey. The Chiefs went through a poor start in their first six games as they were 1–5, and lost their star running back, Jamaal Charles, to a torn ACL in his right knee during an 18–17 Week 5 loss at home against the Chicago Bears. In week 16, after their ninth consecutive victory and the Baltimore Ravens win over the Pittsburgh Steelers, the Chiefs clinched a playoff berth, their second in three years. They are the first team since the 1970 Cincinnati Bengals to start the season 1–5 and qualify for the playoffs. The Chiefs also set the franchise record for the most consecutive victories, winning 10 in a row (which has since been eclipsed by the 2019–2020 squads).

In their Wild Card matchup, the Chiefs shutout the Texans 30–0 to earn their first playoff win in 22 years, ending what was at the time, until the Bengals broke the record the night the Chiefs won, an NFL record for consecutive playoff losses. The shutout was the Chiefs first ever playoff shutout and remains, as of the 2025-2026 NFL playoffs, the most recent playoff shutout in the NFL. The following week, they were defeated by the New England Patriots in the divisional round 27–20. Two Chiefs took home awards at the 5th NFL Honors, honoring performances from the 2015 season. Cornerback Marcus Peters won Defensive Rookie of the Year after leading the NFL in interceptions. Safety Eric Berry won Comeback Player of the Year after a being named All-Pro the year after having his season cut short due to a lymphoma diagnosis.

This was the last season that the Chiefs did not win the AFC West until 2025, as the franchise went on to win 9 consecutive division titles.

== Roster changes ==
=== Offseason ===
==== Reserve/future free agent contracts ====
Player	Position
Brandon Barden	TE
Armon Binns	WR
Hebron Fangupo	DT
Curtis Feight	T
Brandon Hartson	LS
Ricky Henry	G
Aaron Hester	CB
Deji Olatoye	
Jarrod Pughsley	T
Da'Rick Rogers	WR
Adam Schiltz	TE
Derek Sherrod	T
Spencer Ware	HB
Fred Williams	WR
Jerel Worthy	DT

==== Cuts ====
Position	Player	2015 team
LB	Joe Mays	New York Jets
DT	Vance Walker	Denver Broncos
TE	Anthony Fasano	Tennessee Titans
WR	Donnie Avery	None
WR	A. J. Jenkins	Dallas Cowboys
WR	Dwayne Bowe	Cleveland Browns
G	Mike McGlynn	New Orleans Saints

==== Trades ====
Position	Player/pick received	Team	Compensation
G	Ben Grubbs	New Orleans Saints	5th round pick, 2015 NFL draft
FS	Kelcie McCray	Seattle Seahawks	5th round pick, 2016 NFL draft

| SS || Ben Dinnucci || Denver Broncos || 5th round pick,
2016 NFL draft |}

==== Free agents ====
Position	Player	Status*	2014 team(s)	2015 team
WR	Jason Avant	UFA	Kansas City Chiefs	Kansas City Chiefs
S	Tyvon Branch	UFA	Oakland Raiders	Kansas City Chiefs
FS	Kurt Coleman	UFA	Kansas City Chiefs	Carolina Panthers
LS	Thomas Gafford	UFA	Kansas City Chiefs	Chicago Bears
TE	Richard Gordon	UFA	Kansas City Chiefs	Kansas City Chiefs
WR	Frankie Hammond	ERFA	Kansas City Chiefs	Kansas City Chiefs
TE	Demetrius Harris	ERFA	Kansas City Chiefs	Kansas City Chiefs
T	Ryan Harris	UFA	Kansas City Chiefs	Denver Broncos
WR	Junior Hemingway	ERFA	Kansas City Chiefs	Kansas City Chiefs
LB	Justin Houston	UFA	Kansas City Chiefs	Kansas City Chiefs
C	Rodney Hudson	UFA	Kansas City Chiefs	Oakland Raiders
G	Jeff Linkenbach	UFA	Kansas City Chiefs	Miami Dolphins
WR	Jeremy Maclin	UFA	Philadelphia Eagles	Kansas City Chiefs
LB	Josh Martin	ERFA	Kansas City Chiefs	Kansas City Chiefs
LB	Josh Mauga	UFA	Kansas City Chiefs	Kansas City Chiefs
FS	Kelcie McCray	RFA	Kansas City Chiefs	Seattle Seahawks
RB	Joe McKnight	UFA	Kansas City Chiefs	None
CB	Chris Owens	UFA	Kansas City Chiefs	New Orleans Saints
CB	Ron Parker	UFA	Kansas City Chiefs	Kansas City Chiefs
DE	Kevin Vickerson	UFA	Kansas City Chiefs	New York Jets
*RFA: Restricted free agent, UFA: Unrestricted free agent, ERFA: Exclusive rights free agent, Franchise: Franchise tag

==== Draft ====
2015 Kansas City Chiefs Draft
Round	Selection	Player	Position	College
1	18	Marcus Peters	Cornerback	Washington
2	49	Mitch Morse	Guard	Missouri
3	76	Chris Conley	Wide receiver	Georgia
3	98	Steven Nelson	Cornerback	Oregon State
4	118	Ramik Wilson	Linebacker	Georgia
5	172	D. J. Alexander	Linebacker	Oregon State
5	173	James O'Shaughnessy	Tight End	Illinois State
6	217	Rakeem Nuñez-Roches	Defensive Tackle	Southern Mississippi
7	233	Da'Ron Brown	Wide Receiver	Northern Illinois

Compensatory selection

Notes

- The Chiefs traded their fifth-round selection (No. 154 overall) to the New Orleans Saints in exchange for guard Ben Grubbs.
- The Chiefs traded their 3rd round pick (80th overall) and their 6th round pick (193rd overall) to the Minnesota Vikings for their 3rd round pick (76th overall)

=== Preseason transactions ===
==== Cuts ====
Cuts to 75
Position	Player
WR	Kenny Cook
T	Anthony Dima
LS	Andrew East
CB	Aaron Hester
DE	Vaughn Martin
CB	Kenneth Penny
G	Marcus Reed
TE	Adam Schiltz
WR	Jeret Smith
DL	Charles Tuaau
WR	L’Damian Washington
WR	Junior Hemingway
OL	Tavon Rooks

Cuts to 53
Position	Player
WR	Da'Ron Brown
DE	Mike Catapano
S	Sanders Commings
LB	Ja'Gared Davis
DT	Hebron Fangupo
C	Garrett Frye
DL	David Irving
LB	James-Michael Johnson
C	Eric Kush
WR	Tello Luckett
C	Daniel Munyer
DB	Deji Olatoye
G	Jarrod Pughsley
RB	Darrin Reaves
DB	Kevin Short
OT	Derek Sherrod
TE	Ryan Taylor
FB	Spencer Ware
WR	Fredd Williams
TE	Richard Gordon

=== Regular season transactions ===
==== Suspensions served ====
Position	Player	Length	Reason	Weeks served
CB	Sean Smith	4 games	Violation of personal conduct policy	1–4

==== Signings ====
Position	Player	Previous team
TE	Brian Parker	San Diego Chargers
RB	Spencer Ware	Kansas City Chiefs*
DL	David King	Seattle Seahawks
T	Jah Reid	Baltimore Ravens
T	Jarrod Pughsley	Kansas City Chiefs*

==== Players involved in multiple transactions ====
This list is for players who were involved in more than one transaction during the season

Position	Player	Final status
LB	Dezman Moses	Chiefs active roster
WR	Frankie Hammond	Chiefs active roster
WR	Saalim Hakim	Free agent
OL	Daniel Munyer	Chiefs active roster

*Indicates player was signed off the practice squad of the team listed

== Staff ==
2015 Kansas City Chiefs staff
Front office: Chairman/CEO – Clark Hunt; President – Mark Donovan; Executive vice president of football operations – Andy Reid; General manager – John Dorsey; Director of football administration – Trip MacCracken; Director of football operations – Chris Ballard; Co-director of player personnel – Mike Borgonzi; Co-director of player personnel – Brett Veach; Director of college scouting – Marvin Allen; Director of pro scouting – Will Lewis; Head coaches: Head coach – Andy Reid; Assistant head coach/wide receivers – David Culley; Senior assistant to the head coach – Kyle Childress; Offensive coaches: Offensive coordinator – Doug Pederson; Quarterbacks – Matt Nagy; Assistant quarterbacks – Corey Matthaei; Running backs – Eric Bieniemy; Tight ends – Tom Melvin; Offensive line – Andy Heck; Assistant offensive line – Eugene Chung; Special projects/spread game analysts – Brad Childress; Statistical analysis coordinator – Mike Frazier	Defensive coaches: Defensive coordinator – Bob Sutton; Defensive line – Tommy Brasher; Assistant defensive line – Britt Reid; Linebackers – Gary Gibbs; Assistant linebackers – Mark DeLeone; Defensive backs – Emmitt Thomas; Assistant secondary – Al Harris; Coaching assistant – Dino Vasso; Special teams coaches: Special teams – Dave Toub; Assistant special teams – Brock Olivo; Strength and conditioning: Strength and conditioning – Barry Rubin; Assistant strength and conditioning – Travis Crittenden; Assistant strength and conditioning – Brent Salazar

== Final roster ==
2015 Kansas City Chiefs roster
Quarterbacks (QB): 10 Chase Daniel; 7 Aaron Murray; 11 Alex Smith; Running backs (RB): 34 Knile Davis; 42 Anthony Sherman FB; 32 Spencer Ware; 35 Charcandrick West; Wide receivers (WR): 81 Jason Avant; 17 Chris Conley; 85 Frankie Hammond; 19 Jeremy Maclin; 12 Albert Wilson; Tight ends (TE): 84 Demetrius Harris; 87 Travis Kelce; 82 Brian Parker	Offensive linemen (OL): 71 Jeff Allen G/T; 76 Laurent Duvernay-Tardif G; 72 Eric Fisher T; 73 Zach Fulton G/C; 61 Mitch Morse C; 60 Jarrod Pughsley G; 75 Jah Reid T; 79 Donald Stephenson T; Defensive linemen (DL): 97 Allen Bailey DE; 70 Mike DeVito DE; 96 Jaye Howard DE; 93 David King DE; 99 Rakeem Nuñez-Roches NT; 92 Dontari Poe NT; 98 Nick Williams DE	Linebackers (LB): 57 D. J. Alexander ILB; 55 Dee Ford OLB; 91 Tamba Hali OLB; 50 Justin Houston OLB; 56 Derrick Johnson ILB; 90 Josh Mauga ILB; 54 Dezman Moses OLB; 53 Ramik Wilson ILB; 51 Frank Zombo OLB; Defensive backs (DB): 39 Husain Abdullah FS; 29 Eric Berry FS; 27 Tyvon Branch SS; 31 Marcus Cooper CB; 30 Jamell Fleming CB; 20 Steven Nelson CB; 38 Ron Parker SS; 22 Marcus Peters CB; 21 Sean Smith CB; 49 Daniel Sorensen FS; Special teams (ST): 2 Dustin Colquitt P; 5 Cairo Santos K; 41 James Winchester LS	Practice squad: 44 Tyrell Adams OLB; 4 Da'Ron Brown WR; 65 Laurence Gibson T; 67 Michael Liedtke G; 64 Daniel Munyer C; 24 Darrin Reaves RB; 94 Jimmy Staten DE; 88 Ross Travis TE; 83 Fred Williams WR; Reserve: 9 Tyler Bray QB (NF-Inj.); 25 Jamaal Charles RB (IR); 74 Paul Fanaika G (IR); 23 Phillip Gaines CB (IR); 66 Ben Grubbs G (IR); 59 Justin March OLB (IR); 80 James O'Shaughnessy TE (IR); -- Tavon Rooks T (NF-Ill.); 13 De'Anthony Thomas WR (NF-Inj.); Rookies in italics 52 active, 9 reserve, 9 practice squad

== Preseason ==
=== Schedule ===
Week	Date	Opponent	Result	Record	Venue	Recap
1	August 15	at Arizona Cardinals	W 34–19	1–0	University of Phoenix Stadium	Recap
2	August 21	Seattle Seahawks	W 14–13	2–0	Arrowhead Stadium	Recap
3	August 28	Tennessee Titans	W 34–10	3–0	Arrowhead Stadium	Recap
4	September 3	at St. Louis Rams	W 24–17	4–0	Edward Jones Dome	Recap

=== Game summaries ===
==== Week 1: at Arizona Cardinals ====
Week 1: Kansas City Chiefs at Arizona Cardinals – Game summary

Quarter	1	2	3	4	Total
Chiefs	0	17	14	3	34
Cardinals	10	0	0	9	19

at University of Phoenix Stadium, Glendale, Arizona

- Date: August 15
- Game time: 8:00 p.m. CDT/6:00 p.m. MST
- Game weather: None (retractable roof closed)
- Game attendance: 62,313
- Referee: Pete Morelli
- Recap, Game Book

Game information

First quarter

- ARI – Andre Ellington 2-yard run (Chandler Catanzaro kick), 11:32. Cardinals 7–0. Drive: 7 plays, 80 yards, 3:28.
- ARI – Chandler Catanzaro 33-yard field goal, 8:23. Cardinals 10–0. Drive: 4 plays, 3 yards, 0:54.

Second quarter

- KC – Cairo Santos 48-yard field goal, 14:55. Cardinals 10–3. Drive: 6 plays, 36 yards, 3:19.
- KC – Fred Williams 13-yard pass from Chase Daniel (Cairo Santos kick), 4:28. Tied 10–10. Drive: 12 plays, 79 yards, 6:26.
- KC – Frankie Hammond 14-yard pass from Chase Daniel (Cairo Santos kick), 0:07. Chiefs 17–10. Drive: 7 plays, 78 yards, 1:08.

Third quarter

- KC – Da'Ron Brown 3-yard pass from Chase Daniel (Cairo Santos kick), 10:30. Chiefs 24–10. Drive: 9 plays, 80 yards, 4:30.
- KC – Darrin Reaves 1-yard run (Cairo Santos kick), 8:08. Chiefs 31–10. Drive: 3 plays, 4 yards, 1:26.

Fourth quarter

- ARI – Tyler Bray sacked in end zone by Rodney Gunter for a Safety, 13:25. Chiefs 31–12.
- KC – Cairo Santos 34-yard field goal, 6:42. Chiefs 34–12. Drive: 11 plays, 42 yards, 6:00.
- ARI – Travis Harvey 1-yard pass from Phillip Sims (Chandler Catanzaro kick), 0:29. Chiefs 34–19. Drive: 7 plays, 89 yards, 1:15.

Top passers

- KC – Chase Daniel – 17/21, 189 yards, 3 TD
- ARI – Logan Thomas – 9/15, 107 yards, INT

Top rushers

- KC – Charcandrick West – 6 rushes, 49 yards
- ARI – Kerwynn Williams – 7 rushes, 20 yards

Top receivers

- KC – Fred Williams – 6 receptions, 82 yards, TD
- ARI – Andre Ellington – 2 receptions, 59 yards

==== Week 2: vs. Seattle Seahawks ====
Week 2: Seattle Seahawks at Kansas City Chiefs – Game summary

Quarter	1	2	3	4	Total
Seahawks	0	10	3	0	13
Chiefs	0	7	7	0	14

at Arrowhead Stadium, Kansas City, Missouri

- Date: August 21
- Game time: 7:00 p.m. CDT
- Game weather: 84 °F (29 °C)
- Game attendance: 71,915
- Referee: Alex Kemp
- Recap, Game Book

Game information

First quarter

- No scoring plays.

Second quarter

- KC – Jeremy Maclin 3-yard pass from Alex Smith (Cairo Santos kick), 9:56. Chiefs 7–0. Drive: 14 plays, 83 yards, 7:14.
- SEA – Stephen Hauschka 39-yard field goal, 2:52. Chiefs 7–3. Drive: 14 plays, 59 yards, 7:04.
- SEA – Bobby Wagner 25-yard interception return (Stephen Hauschka kick), 2:38. Seahawks 10–7.

Third quarter

- KC – James O'Shaughnessy 1-yard pass from Chase Daniel (Cairo Santos kick), 11:53. Chiefs 14–10. Drive: 7 plays, 86 yards, 3:07.
- SEA – Stephen Hauschka 27-yard field goal, 4:12. Chiefs 14–13. Drive: 13 plays, 61 yards, 7:41.

Fourth quarter

- No scoring plays.

Top passers

- SEA – R. J. Archer – 9/14, 83 yards
- KC – Chase Daniel – 8/12, 82 yards, TD

Top rushers

- SEA – Christine Michael – 10 rushes, 27 yards
- KC – Charcandrick West – 13 rushes, 40 yards

Top receivers

- SEA – Tyler Lockett – 3 receptions, 42 yards
- KC – Frankie Hammond – 3 receptions, 36 yards

==== Week 3: vs. Tennessee Titans ====
Week 3: Tennessee Titans at Kansas City Chiefs – Game summary

Quarter	1	2	3	4	Total
Titans	0	10	0	0	10
Chiefs	9	8	3	14	34

at Arrowhead Stadium, Kansas City, Missouri

- Date: August 28
- Game time: 7:00 p.m. CDT
- Game weather: Cloudy, 77 °F (25 °C)
- Game attendance: 69,813
- Referee: Walt Coleman
- Recap, Game Book

Game information

First quarter

- KC – Jeremy Maclin 29-yard pass from Alex Smith (kick failed, wide left), 11:12. Chiefs 6–0. Drive: 8 plays, 80 yards, 3:48.
- KC – Cairo Santos 21-yard field goal, 1:16. Chiefs 9–0. Drive: 11 plays, 54 yards, 6:07.

Second quarter

- KC – Travis Kelce 8-yard pass from Alex Smith (Charcandrick West run), 11:02. Chiefs 17–0. Drive: 7 plays, 81 yards, 3:41.
- TEN – Ryan Succop 34-yard field goal, 3:59. Chiefs 17–3. Drive: 10 plays, 66 yards, 7:03.
- TEN – Antonio Andrews 2-yard run (Ryan Succop kick), 0:52. Chiefs 17–10. Drive: 7 plays, 43 yards, 2:01.

Third quarter

- KC – Cairo Santos 22-yard field goal, 2:40. Chiefs 20–10. Drive: 14 plays, 87 yards, 8:52.

Fourth quarter

- KC – Fred Williams 29-yard pass from Aaron Murray (Cairo Santos kick), 9:25. Chiefs 27–10. Drive: 10 plays, 98 yards, 5:07.
- KC – Fred Williams 4-yard pass from Aaron Murray (Cairo Santos kick), 8:11. Chiefs 34–10. Drive: 3 plays, 8 yards, 0:55.

Top passers

- TEN – Marcus Mariota – 7/11, 99 yards
- KC – Alex Smith – 16/18, 171 yards, 2 TD

Top rushers

- TEN – Dexter McCluster – 5 rushes, 37 yards
- KC – Charcandrick West – 9 rushes, 47 yards

Top receivers

- TEN – Kendall Wright – 3 receptions, 60 yards
- KC – Jeremy Maclin – 7 receptions, 65 yards, TD

==== Week 4: at St. Louis Rams ====
Week 4: Kansas City Chiefs at St. Louis Rams – Game summary

Quarter	1	2	3	4	Total
Chiefs	7	10	7	0	24
Rams	14	3	0	0	17

at Edward Jones Dome, St. Louis, Missouri

- Date: September 3
- Game time: 7:00 p.m. CDT
- Game weather: None (indoor stadium)
- Game attendance: 37,616
- Referee: Bill Vinovich
- Recap, Game Book

Game information

First quarter

- KC – Spencer Ware 1-yard run (Cairo Santos kick), 12:29. Chiefs 7–0. Drive: 2 plays, 8 yards, 0:39.
- STL – Isaiah Pead 1-yard run (Greg Zuerlein kick), 8:30. Tied 7–7. Drive: 7 plays, 73 yards, 3:59.
- STL – Cody Davis 24-yard interception return (Greg Zuerlein kick), 4:00. Rams 14–7.

Second quarter

- KC – Chris Conley 15-yard pass from Chase Daniel (Cairo Santos kick), 12:36. Tied 14–14. Drive: 12 plays, 80 yards, 6:24.
- KC – Cairo Santos 23-yard field goal, 4:02. Chiefs 17–14. Drive: 9 plays, 47 yards, 3:56.
- STL – Greg Zuerlein 57-yard field goal, 1:45. Tied 17–17. Drive: 4 plays, 10 yards, 0:28.

Third quarter

- KC – Darrin Reaves 12-yard pass from Aaron Murray (Cairo Santos kick), 8:40. Chiefs 24–17. Drive: 10 plays, 81 yards, 6:20.

Fourth quarter

- No scoring plays.

Top passers

- KC – Chase Daniel – 16/20, 117 yards, TD, INT
- STL – Sean Mannion – 11/24, 107 yards

Top rushers

- KC – Spencer Ware – 10 rushes, 45 yards, TD
- STL – Isaiah Pead – 12 rushes, 52 yards, TD

Top receivers

- KC – Darrin Reaves – 8 receptions, 42 yards, TD
- STL – Tavon Austin – 2 receptions, 49 yards

== Regular season ==
=== Schedule ===
Week	Date	Opponent	Result	Record	Venue	Recap
1	September 13	at Houston Texans	**W** 27–20	1–0	NRG Stadium	Recap
2	September 17	**Denver Broncos**	**L** 24–31	1–1	Arrowhead Stadium	Recap
3	September 28	at Green Bay Packers	**L** 28–38	1–2	Lambeau Field	Recap
4	October 4	at Cincinnati Bengals	**L** 21–36	1–3	Paul Brown Stadium	Recap
5	October 11	Chicago Bears	**L** 17–18	1–4	Arrowhead Stadium	Recap
6	October 18	at Minnesota Vikings	**L** 10–16	1–5	TCF Bank Stadium	Recap
7	October 25	Pittsburgh Steelers	**W** 23–13	2–5	Arrowhead Stadium	Recap
8	November 1	Detroit Lions	**W** 45–10	3–5	(United Kingdom) Wembley Stadium (London)	Recap
9	Bye					
10	November 15	at **Denver Broncos**	**W** 29–13	4–5	Sports Authority Field at Mile High	Recap
11	November 22	at **San Diego Chargers**	**W** 33–3	5–5	Qualcomm Stadium	Recap
12	November 29	Buffalo Bills	**W** 30–22	6–5	Arrowhead Stadium	Recap
13	December 6	at **Oakland Raiders**	**W** 34–20	7–5	O.co Coliseum	Recap
14	December 13	**San Diego Chargers**	**W** 10–3	8–5	Arrowhead Stadium	Recap
15	December 20	at Baltimore Ravens	**W** 34–14	9–5	M&T Bank Stadium	Recap
16	December 27	Cleveland Browns	**W** 17–13	10–5	Arrowhead Stadium	Recap
17	January 3	**Oakland Raiders**	**W** 23–17	11–5	Arrowhead Stadium	Recap

Note: Intra-division opponents are in bold text.

=== Game summaries ===
==== Week 1: at Houston Texans ====
Week 1: Kansas City Chiefs at Houston Texans – Game summary

Quarter	1	2	3	4	Total
**Chiefs**	14	13	0	0	**27**
Texans	6	3	0	11	**20**

at NRG Stadium, Houston, Texas

- Date: September 13
- Game time: 12:00 p.m. CDT
- Game weather: None (retractable roof closed)
- Game attendance: 71,776
- Referee: Pete Morelli
- TV announcers (CBS): Kevin Harlan and Rich Gannon
- Recap, Game Book

Game information

**First quarter**

- KC – Travis Kelce 10-yard pass from Alex Smith (Cairo Santos kick), 10:22. Chiefs 7–0. **Drive: 2 plays, 13 yards, 0:42.**
- KC – Travis Kelce 42-yard pass from Alex Smith (Cairo Santos kick), 4:28. Chiefs 14–0. **Drive: 8 plays, 83 yards, 4:32.**
- HOU – DeAndre Hopkins 4-yard pass from Brian Hoyer (kick failed, wide right), 0:46. Chiefs 14–6. **Drive: 8 plays, 88 yards, 3:42.**

**Second quarter**

- KC – Cairo Santos 27-yard field goal, 10:26. Chiefs 17–6. **Drive: 10 plays, 66 yards, 5:20.**
- KC – Cairo Santos 48-yard field goal, 6:20. Chiefs 20–6. **Drive: 5 plays, 22 yards, 2:32.**
- KC – Jamaal Charles 7-yard pass from Alex Smith (Cairo Santos kick), 4:55. Chiefs 27–6. **Drive: 1 play, 7 yards, 0:06.**
- HOU – Randy Bullock 34-yard field goal, 0:09. Chiefs 27–9. **Drive: 11 plays, 64 yards, 2:17.**

**Third quarter**

- No scoring plays.

**Fourth quarter**

- HOU – DeAndre Hopkins 8-yard pass from Ryan Mallett (Ryan Mallett–DeAndre Hopkins pass), 4:07. Chiefs 27–17. **Drive: 6 plays, 59 yards, 2:03.**
- HOU – Randy Bullock 47-yard field goal, 1:23. Chiefs 27–20. **Drive: 10 plays, 48 yards, 1:24.**

**Top passers**

- KC – Alex Smith – 22/33, 243 yards, 3 TD
- HOU – Brian Hoyer – 18/34, 236 yards, TD, INT

**Top rushers**

- KC – Jamaal Charles – 16 rushes, 57 yards
- HOU – Alfred Blue – 9 rushes, 42 yards

**Top receivers**

- KC – Travis Kelce – 6 receptions, 106 yards, 2 TD
- HOU – Nate Washington – 6 receptions, 105 yards

With the win, the Chiefs started their 2015 campaign at 1–0.

==== Week 2: vs. Denver Broncos ====
Week 2: Denver Broncos at Kansas City Chiefs – Game summary

Quarter	1	2	3	4	Total
**Broncos**	0	14	3	14	**31**
Chiefs	0	14	3	7	**24**

at Arrowhead Stadium, Kansas City, Missouri

- Date: September 17
- Game time: 7:30 p.m. CDT
- Game weather: Cloudy, 87 °F (31 °C)
- Game attendance: 76,404
- Referee: Walt Anderson
- TV announcers (CBS/NFLN): Jim Nantz, Phil Simms and Tracy Wolfson
- Recap, Game Book

Game information

**First quarter**

- No scoring plays.

**Second quarter**

- KC – Jamaal Charles 34-yard run (Cairo Santos kick), 9:11. Chiefs 7–0. **Drive: 6 plays, 78 yards, 3:23.**
- KC – Marcus Peters 55-yard interception return (Cairo Santos kick), 6:27. Chiefs 14–0.
- DEN – Emmanuel Sanders 16-yard pass from Peyton Manning (Brandon McManus kick), 2:31. Chiefs 14–7. **Drive: 10 plays, 80 yards, 3:56.**
- DEN – Virgil Green 1-yard pass from Peyton Manning (Brandon McManus kick), 0:48. Tied 14–14. **Drive: 4 plays, 15 yards, 1:33.**

**Third quarter**

- KC – Cairo Santos 35-yard field goal, 9:47. Chiefs 17–14. **Drive: 10 plays, 63 yards, 5:13.**
- DEN – Brandon McManus 54-yard field goal, 3:18. Tied 17–17. **Drive: 5 plays, 22 yards, 1:42.**

**Fourth quarter**

- KC – Knile Davis 8-yard run (Cairo Santos kick), 2:27. Chiefs 24–17. **Drive: 6 plays, 61 yards, 2:15.**
- DEN – Emmanuel Sanders 19-yard pass from Peyton Manning (Brandon McManus kick), 0:36. Tied 24–24. **Drive: 10 plays, 80 yards, 1:51.**
- DEN – Bradley Roby 21-yard fumble return (Brandon McManus kick), 0:27. Broncos 31–24.

**Top passers**

- DEN – Peyton Manning – 26/45, 256 yards, 3 TD, INT
- KC – Alex Smith – 16/25, 191 yards, 2 INT

**Top rushers**

- DEN – Ronnie Hillman – 9 rushes, 34 yards
- KC – Jamaal Charles – 21 rushes, 125 yards, TD

**Top receivers**

- DEN – Demaryius Thomas – 8 receptions, 116 yards
- KC – Travis Kelce – 4 receptions, 58 yards

The Broncos would score two touchdowns in the final minute to steal the win from the Chiefs. The second touchdown was a critical fumble by running back Jamaal Charles.

With the heartbreaking and stunning loss, the Chiefs fell to 1–1, and picked up their seventh straight loss to Denver. This marked their last loss to the Broncos until 2023 and their last home loss to Denver until 2025.

==== Week 3: at Green Bay Packers ====
Week 3: Kansas City Chiefs at Green Bay Packers – Game summary

Quarter	1	2	3	4	Total
Chiefs	0	7	7	14	**28**
**Packers**	14	10	7	7	**38**

at Lambeau Field, Green Bay, Wisconsin

- Date: September 28
- Game time: 7:30 p.m. CDT
- Game weather: Light showers, 67 °F (19 °C)
- Game attendance: 78,214
- Referee: John Parry
- TV announcers (ESPN): Mike Tirico, Jon Gruden and Lisa Salters
- Recap, Game Book

Game information

**First quarter**

- GB – Ty Montgomery 8-yard pass from Aaron Rodgers (Mason Crosby kick), 9:44. Packers 7–0. **Drive: 6 plays, 69 yards, 2:36.**
- GB – Randall Cobb 3-yard pass from Aaron Rodgers (Mason Crosby kick), 2:18. Packers 14–0. **Drive: 10 plays, 89 yards, 5:51.**

**Second quarter**

- KC – Jamaal Charles 9-yard run (Cairo Santos kick), 12:02. Packers 14–7. **Drive: 3 plays, 61 yards, 1:06.**
- GB – Mason Crosby 44-yard field goal, 6:15. Packers 17–7. **Drive: 9 plays, 51 yards, 5:47.**
- GB – James Jones 27-yard pass from Aaron Rodgers (Mason Crosby kick), 0:56. Packers 24–7. **Drive: 9 plays, 68 yards, 3:02.**

**Third quarter**

- GB – Randall Cobb 4-yard pass from Aaron Rodgers (Mason Crosby kick), 7:18. Packers 31–7. **Drive: 1 play, 4 yards, 0:04.**
- KC – Jeremy Maclin 5-yard pass from Alex Smith (Cairo Santos kick), 0:56. Packers 31–14. **Drive: 11 plays, 80 yards, 6:22.**

**Fourth quarter**

- GB – Randall Cobb 4-yard pass from Aaron Rodgers (Mason Crosby kick), 12:10. Packers 38–14. **Drive: 8 plays, 80 yards, 3:46.**
- KC – Jamaal Charles 4-yard run (Alex Smith–Travis Kelce pass), 9:56. Packers 38–22. **Drive: 7 plays, 89 yards, 2:14.**
- KC – Jamaal Charles 7-yard run (pass failed), 1:25. Packers 38–28. **Drive: 17 plays, 83 yards, 4:23.**

**Top passers**

- KC – Alex Smith – 24/40, 290 yards, TD, INT
- GB – Aaron Rodgers – 24/35, 333 yards, 5 TD

**Top rushers**

- KC – Jamaal Charles – 11 rushes, 49 yards, 3 TD
- GB – Eddie Lacy – 10 rushes, 46 yards

**Top receivers**

- KC – Jeremy Maclin – 8 receptions, 141 yards, TD
- GB – James Jones – 7 receptions, 139 yards, TD

In a rematch of the 2011 game, the Chiefs fell to 1–2. This was also their first loss at Lambeau Field, as well their first loss in Wisconsin.

==== Week 4: at Cincinnati Bengals ====
Week 4: Kansas City Chiefs at Cincinnati Bengals – Game summary

Quarter	1	2	3	4	Total
Chiefs	3	9	3	6	**21**
**Bengals**	14	0	15	7	**36**

at Paul Brown Stadium, Cincinnati, Ohio

- Date: October 4
- Game time: 1:00 p.m. EDT/12:00 p.m. CDT
- Game weather: Sunny, 68 °F (20 °C)
- Game attendance: 57,498
- Referee: Ronald Torbert
- TV announcers (CBS): Spero Dedes and Solomon Wilcots
- Recap, Game Book

Game information

**First quarter**

- CIN – Jeremy Hill 8-yard run (Mike Nugent kick), 11:33. Bengals 7–0. **Drive: 7 plays, 80 yards, 3:27.**
- KC – Cairo Santos 22-yard field goal, 4:38. Bengals 7–3. **Drive: 13 plays, 78 yards, 6:58.**
- CIN – Giovani Bernard 13-yard run (Mike Nugent kick), 0:53. Bengals 14–3. **Drive: 7 plays, 80 yards, 3:42.**

**Second quarter**

- KC – Cairo Santos 40 yard field goal, 12:44. Bengals 14–6. **Drive: 6 plays, 58 yards, 3:09.**
- KC – Cairo Santos 51 yard field goal, 6:09. Bengals 14–9. **Drive: 10 plays, 60 yards, 4:34.**
- KC – Cairo Santos 34 yard field goal, 0:04. Bengals 14–12. **Drive: 8 plays, 49 yards, 4:24.**

**Third quarter**

- CIN – Brandon Tate 55-yard pass from Andy Dalton (Mike Nugent kick), 8:43. Bengals 21–12. **Drive: 7 plays, 77 yards, 3:08.**
- KC – Cairo Santos 40 yard field goal, 4:37. Bengals 21–15. **Drive: 8 plays, 58 yards, 4:06.**
- CIN – Jeremy Hill 5 yard run (Jeremy Hill run), 0:11. Bengals 29–15. **Drive: 2 plays, 5 yards, 0:12.**

**Fourth quarter**

- KC – Cairo Santos 29 yard field goal, 9:28. Bengals 29–18. **Drive: 16 plays, 71 yards, 5:43.**
- CIN – Jeremy Hill 1 yard run (Mike Nugent kick), 4:50. Bengals 36–18. **Drive: 8 plays, 60 yards, 4:38.**
- KC – Cairo Santos 51 yard field goal, 2:34. Bengals 36–21. **Drive: 5 plays, 47 yards, 2:16.**

**Top passers**

- KC – Alex Smith – 31/45, 386 yards
- CIN – Andy Dalton – 17/24, 321 yards, TD

**Top rushers**

- KC – Jamaal Charles – 11 rushes, 75 yards
- CIN – Giovani Bernard – 13 rushes, 62 yards, TD

**Top receivers**

- KC – Jeremy Maclin – 11 receptions, 148 yards
- CIN – Mohamed Sanu – 4 receptions, 84 yards

Cairo Santos would kick 7 field goals in this game, setting a new franchise record for most field goals in one game by a Kansas City kicker. The 7 kicks also tied an NFL record. However, the 7 field goals by Santos were not enough to beat the Bengals, as the Chiefs fell to 1–3.

==== Week 5: vs. Chicago Bears ====
Week 5: Chicago Bears at Kansas City Chiefs – Game summary

Quarter	1	2	3	4	Total
**Bears**	3	0	3	12	**18**
Chiefs	7	10	0	0	**17**

at Arrowhead Stadium, Kansas City, Missouri

- Date: October 11
- Game time: 12:00 p.m. CDT
- Game weather: Sunny, 72 °F (22 °C)
- Game attendance: 75,799
- Referee: Tony Corrente
- TV announcers (Fox): Sam Rosen, John Lynch and Pam Oliver
- Recap, Game Book

Game information

**First quarter**

- KC – Ramik Wilson fumble recovery in end zone (Cairo Santos kick), 8:13. Chiefs 7–0.
- CHI – Robbie Gould 44-yard field goal, 0:53. Chiefs 7–3. **Drive: 14 plays, 54 yards, 7:20.**

**Second quarter**

- KC – De'Anthony Thomas 19-yard pass from Alex Smith (Cairo Santos kick), 9:57. Chiefs 14–3. **Drive: 7 plays, 54 yards, 3:28.**
- KC – Cairo Santos 35-yard field goal, 0:09. Chiefs 17–3. **Drive: 11 plays, 57 yards, 3:00.**

**Third quarter**

- CHI – Robbie Gould 30-yard field goal, 3:29. Chiefs 17–6. **Drive: 11 plays, 73 yards, 5:13.**

**Fourth quarter**

- CHI – Marquess Wilson 22-yard pass from Jay Cutler (pass failed), 3:05. Chiefs 17–12. **Drive: 11 plays, 88 yards, 4:46.**
- CHI – Matt Forte 7-yard pass from Jay Cutler (pass failed), 0:18. Bears 18–17. **Drive: 8 plays, 67 yards, 1:46.**

**Top passers**

- CHI – Jay Cutler – 26/45, 252 yards, 2 TD
- KC – Alex Smith – 16/30, 181 yards, TD

**Top rushers**

- CHI – Matt Forte – 18 rushes, 71 yards
- KC – Jamaal Charles – 12 rushes, 58 yards

**Top receivers**

- CHI – Marquess Wilson – 6 receptions, 85 yards, TD
- KC – Jeremy Maclin – 8 receptions, 85 yards

The Chiefs would build a 17–3 lead at one point, but Chicago would pull off a comeback to win 18–17. The Chiefs tried a 66-yard field goal, but Santos kick went wide right and missed everything near the goalposts.

With the loss, Kansas City fell to 1–4. They would also lose Jamaal Charles for the season, as he tore his ACL in this game.

==== Week 6: at Minnesota Vikings ====
Week 6: Kansas City Chiefs at Minnesota Vikings – Game summary

Quarter	1	2	3	4	Total
Chiefs	0	0	0	10	**10**
**Vikings**	3	7	3	3	**16**

at TCF Bank Stadium, Minneapolis, Minnesota

- Date: October 18
- Game time: 12:00 p.m. CDT
- Game weather: Sunny, 54 °F (12 °C)
- Game attendance: 52,480
- Referee: Jerome Boger
- TV announcers (CBS): Greg Gumbel, Trent Green and Stacey Dales
- Recap, Game Book

Game information

**First quarter**

- MIN – Blair Walsh 24-yard field goal, 5:40. Vikings 3–0. **Drive: 9 plays, 48 yards, 4:00.**

**Second quarter**

- MIN – Kyle Rudolph 4-yard pass from Teddy Bridgewater (Blair Walsh kick), 4:43. Vikings 10–0. **Drive: 11 plays, 51 yards, 6:09.**

**Third quarter**

- MIN – Blair Walsh 45-yard field goal, 8:51. Vikings 13–0. **Drive: 6 plays, 46 yards, 2:34.**

**Fourth quarter**

- KC – Cairo Santos 48-yard field goal, 13:10. Vikings 13–3. **Drive: 8 plays, 28 yards, 3:27.**
- KC – Albert Wilson 42-yard pass from Alex Smith (Cairo Santos kick), 8:46. Vikings 13–10. **Drive: 7 plays, 77 yards, 2:26.**
- MIN – Blair Walsh 45-yard field goal, 4:46. Vikings 16–10. **Drive: 10 plays, 53 yards, 4:00.**

**Top passers**

- KC – Alex Smith – 22/37, 282 yards, TD
- MIN – Teddy Bridgewater – 17/31, 249 yards, TD, 2 INT

**Top rushers**

- KC – Charcandrick West – 9 rushes, 33 yards
- MIN – Adrian Peterson – 26 rushes, 60 yards

**Top receivers**

- KC – Travis Kelce – 5 receptions, 88 yards
- MIN – Stefon Diggs – 7 receptions, 129 yards

With their fifth straight loss, the Chiefs fell to 1–5.

==== Week 7: vs. Pittsburgh Steelers ====
Week 7: Pittsburgh Steelers at Kansas City Chiefs – Game summary

Quarter	1	2	3	4	Total
Steelers	3	0	7	3	**13**
**Chiefs**	3	6	7	7	**23**

at Arrowhead Stadium, Kansas City, Missouri

- Date: October 25
- Game time: 12:00 p.m. CDT
- Game weather: Sunny, 58 °F (14 °C)
- Game attendance: 76,365
- Referee: Walt Coleman
- TV announcers (CBS): Greg Gumbel, Trent Green and Stacey Dales
- Recap, Game Book

Game information

**First quarter**

- KC – Cairo Santos 30-yard field goal, 8:47. Chiefs 3–0. **Drive: 10 plays, 48 yards, 4:08.**
- PIT – Chris Boswell 24-yard field goal, 0:59. Tied 3–3. **Drive: 14 plays, 61 yards, 7:48.**

**Second quarter**

- KC – Cairo Santos 22-yard field goal, 8:55. Chiefs 6–3. **Drive: 13 plays, 77 yards, 7:04.**
- KC – Cairo Santos 27-yard field goal, 1:00. Chiefs 9–3. **Drive: 8 plays, 59 yards, 3:41.**

**Third quarter**

- KC – Charcandrick West 1 yard run (Cairo Santos kick), 4:23. Chiefs 16–3. **Drive: 9 plays, 53 yards, 5:22.**
- PIT – Martavis Bryant 19-yard pass from Landry Jones (Chris Boswell kick), 1:40. Chiefs 16–10. **Drive: 6 plays, 77 yards, 2:43.**

**Fourth quarter**

- PIT – Chris Boswell 36-yard field goal, 10:17. Chiefs 16–13. **Drive: 7 plays, 54 yards, 3:56.**
- KC – Chris Conley 6-yard pass from Alex Smith (Cairo Santos kick), 10:17. Chiefs 23–13. **Drive: 8 plays, 84 yards, 5:04.**

**Top passers**

- PIT – Landry Jones – 16/29, 209 yards, TD, 2 INT
- KC – Alex Smith – 21/32, 251 yards, TD

**Top rushers**

- PIT – Le'Veon Bell – 17 rushes, 121 yards
- KC – Charcandrick West – 22 rushes, 110 yards, TD

**Top receivers**

- PIT – Antonio Brown – 6 receptions, 124 yards
- KC – Chris Conley – 6 receptions, 63 yards

Ben Roethlisberger would not play in this game for the Steelers, so backup quarterback Landry Jones led the way for the Steelers. In his first career start, the Chiefs defense would force 3 turnovers, 2 of them interceptions, and the Chiefs would hold on to win 23–13.

With the win, the Chiefs improved to 2–5.

==== Week 8: vs. Detroit Lions ====
NFL International Series

Week 8: Detroit Lions at Kansas City Chiefs – Game summary

Quarter	1	2	3	4	Total
Lions	3	0	0	7	**10**
**Chiefs**	7	17	7	14	**45**

at Wembley Stadium, London, England

- Date: November 1
- Game time: 2:30 p.m. GMT/8:30 a.m. CST
- Game weather: Cloudy, 50 °F (10 °C)
- Game attendance: 83,624
- Referee: Jeff Triplette
- TV announcers (Fox): Sam Rosen, John Lynch and Pam Oliver
- Recap, Game Book

Game information

**First quarter**

- DET – Matt Prater 35-yard field goal, 9:09. Lions 3–0. **Drive: 10 plays, 63 yards, 5:51.**
- KC – De'Anthony Thomas 10-yard run (Cairo Santos kick), 4:06. Chiefs 7–3. **Drive: 9 plays, 56 yards, 5:02.**

**Second quarter**

- KC – Alex Smith 12-yard run (Cairo Santos kick), 12:00. Chiefs 14–3. **Drive: 7 plays, 73 yards, 2:47.**
- KC – Cairo Santos 33-yard field goal, 8:33. Chiefs 17–3. **Drive: 6 plays, 22 yards, 2:42.**
- KC – Charcandrick West 8-yard run (Cairo Santos kick), 3:26. Chiefs 24–3. **Drive: 6 plays, 52 yards, 2:53.**

**Third quarter**

- KC – Travis Kelce 2-yard pass from Alex Smith (Cairo Santos kick), 8:53. Chiefs 31–3. **Drive: 11 plays, 61 yards, 6:07.**

**Fourth quarter**

- KC – Jeremy Maclin 17-yard pass from Alex Smith (Cairo Santos kick), 10:11. Chiefs 38–3. **Drive: 2 plays, 16 yards, 0:46.**
- DET – Lance Moore 21-yard pass from Matthew Stafford (Matt Prater kick), 7:21. Chiefs 38–10. **Drive: 7 plays, 77 yards, 2:50.**
- KC – Spencer Ware 4-yard run (Cairo Santos kick), 6:40. Chiefs 45–10. **Drive: 2 plays, 41 yards, 0:41.**

**Top passers**

- DET – Matthew Stafford – 22/36, 217 yards, TD, 2 INT
- KC – Alex Smith – 18/26, 145 yards, 2 TD

**Top rushers**

- DET – Joique Bell – 7 rushes, 56 yards
- KC – Charcandrick West – 20 rushes, 97 yards, TD

**Top receivers**

- DET – Calvin Johnson – 5 receptions, 85 yards
- KC – Travis Kelce – 6 receptions, 49 yards, TD

In their first ever game in London, the Chiefs routed the crestfallen 1–6 Detroit Lions. With the win, Kansas City improved to 3–5 and they finished 1-3 against the NFC North.

==== Week 10: at Denver Broncos ====
Week 10: Kansas City Chiefs at Denver Broncos – Game summary

Quarter	1	2	3	4	Total
**Chiefs**	10	9	3	7	**29**
Broncos	0	0	0	13	**13**

at Sports Authority Field at Mile High, Denver, Colorado

- Date: November 15
- Game time: 3:25 p.m. CST/2:25 p.m. MST
- Game weather: Mostly sunny, 64 °F (18 °C)
- Game attendance: 76,973
- Referee: Gene Steratore
- TV announcers (CBS): Greg Gumbel, Trent Green and Jamie Erdahl
- Recap, Game Book

Game information

**First quarter**

- KC – Charcandrick West 4-yard run (Cairo Santos kick), 11:21. Chiefs 7–0. **Drive: 5 plays, 31 yards, 2:36.**
- KC – Cairo Santos 48-yard field goal, 6:19. Chiefs 10–0. **Drive: 6 plays, 43 yards, 3:52.**

**Second quarter**

- KC – Cairo Santos 49-yard field goal, 11:35. Chiefs 13–0. **Drive: 8 plays, 19 yards, 3:31.**
- KC – Cairo Santos 34-yard field goal, 3:30. Chiefs 16–0. **Drive: 4 plays, 8 yards, 1:21.**
- KC – Cairo Santos 33-yard field goal, 0:00. Chiefs 19–0. **Drive: 12 plays, 46 yards, 2:38.**

**Third quarter**

- KC – Cairo Santos 50-yard field goal, 10:45. Chiefs 22–0. **Drive: 6 plays, 9 yards, 2:31.**

**Fourth quarter**

- KC – Charcandrick West 80-yard pass from Alex Smith (Cairo Santos kick), 11:10. Chiefs 29–0. **Drive: 2 plays, 81 yards, 0:53.**
- DEN – Ronnie Hillman 1-yard run (run failed), 5:27. Chiefs 29–6. **Drive: 12 plays, 80 yards, 5:43.**
- DEN – Andre Caldwell 7-yard pass from Brock Osweiler (Brandon McManus kick), 1:45. Chiefs 29–13. **Drive: 5 plays, 62 yards, 1:23.**

**Top passers**

- KC – Alex Smith – 17/31, 204 yards, TD
- DEN – Brock Osweiler – 14/24, 146 yards, TD, INT

**Top rushers**

- KC – Charcandrick West – 24 rushes, 69 yards, TD
- DEN – Ronnie Hillman – 11 rushes, 42 yards, TD

**Top receivers**

- KC – Charcandrick West – 3 receptions, 92 yards, TD
- DEN – Demaryius Thomas – 7 receptions, 71 yards

Broncos quarterback Peyton Manning would set the all-time record for most passing yards in NFL history in this game, but the Chiefs defense would have themselves a day, picking off Bronco quarterbacks five times, four on Manning, one on Brock Osweiler, and the Chiefs routed the Broncos, 29–13.

With the win, the Chiefs went to 4–5, and snapped their seven-game losing streak against the Broncos. This marked the first of 15 straight wins against the Broncos.

==== Week 11: at San Diego Chargers ====
Week 11: Kansas City Chiefs at San Diego Chargers – Game summary

Quarter	1	2	3	4	Total
**Chiefs**	6	6	7	14	**33**
Chargers	0	3	0	0	**3**

at Qualcomm Stadium, San Diego, California

- Date: November 22
- Game time: 3:05 p.m. CST/1:05 p.m. PST
- Game weather: Sunny, 87 °F (31 °C)
- Game attendance: 65,837
- Referee: Carl Cheffers
- TV announcers (CBS): Spero Dedes and Solomon Wilcots
- Recap, Game Book

Game information

**First quarter**

- KC – Dontari Poe 1-yard run (kick failed, wide right), 2:09. Chiefs 6–0. **Drive: 9 plays, 71 yards, 5:26.**

**Second quarter**

- SD – Josh Lambo 52-yard field goal, 12:09. Chiefs 6–3. **Drive: 11 plays, 46 yards, 5:00.**
- KC – Cairo Santos 28-yard field goal, 5:53. Chiefs 9–3. **Drive: 11 plays, 70 yards, 6:16.**
- KC – Cairo Santos 24-yard field goal, 0:03. Chiefs 12–3. **Drive: 9 plays, 80 yards, 2:14.**

**Third quarter**

- KC – Justin Houston 17-yard interception return (Cairo Santos kick), 3:27. Chiefs 19–3.

**Fourth quarter**

- KC – Spencer Ware 3-yard run (Cairo Santos kick), 6:11. Chiefs 26–3. **Drive: 6 plays, 77 yards, 3:39.**
- KC – Spencer Ware 3-yard run (Cairo Santos kick), 2:32. Chiefs 33–3. **Drive: 3 plays, 24 yards, 1:41.**

**Top passers**

- KC – Alex Smith – 20/25, 253 yards
- SD – Philip Rivers – 19/30, 178 yards, INT

**Top rushers**

- KC – Spencer Ware – 11 rushes, 96 yards, 2 TD
- SD – Melvin Gordon – 15 rushes, 37 yards

**Top receivers**

- KC – Albert Wilson – 4 receptions, 56 yards
- SD – Stevie Johnson – 7 receptions, 54 yards

With the huge win, Kansas City went to 5–5, and climbed back into playoff contention.

==== Week 12: vs. Buffalo Bills ====
Week 12: Buffalo Bills at Kansas City Chiefs – Game summary

Quarter	1	2	3	4	Total
Bills	10	6	6	0	**22**
**Chiefs**	0	14	10	6	**30**

at Arrowhead Stadium, Kansas City, Missouri

- Date: November 29
- Game time: 12:00 p.m. CST
- Game weather: Cloudy and rainy, 35 °F (2 °C)
- Game attendance: 72,493
- Referee: Terry McAulay
- TV announcers (CBS): Kevin Harlan and Rich Gannon
- Recap, Game Book

Game information

**First quarter**

- BUF – Dan Carpenter 27-yard field goal, 11:53. Bills 3–0. **Drive: 7 plays, 68 yards, 3:07.**
- BUF – Sammy Watkins 28-yard pass from Tyrod Taylor (Dan Carpenter kick), 1:04. Bills 10–0. **Drive: 10 plays, 65 yards, 4:15.**

**Second quarter**

- KC – Spencer Ware 3-yard run (Cairo Santos kick), 6:57. Bills 10–7. **Drive: 6 plays, 80 yards, 3:10.**
- BUF – Sammy Watkins 21-yard pass from Tyrod Taylor (kick failed, wide right), 2:29. Bills 16–7. **Drive: 9 plays, 75 yards, 4:28.**
- KC – Jeremy Maclin 41-yard pass from Alex Smith (Cairo Santos kick), 1:48. Bills 16–14. **Drive: 2 plays, 80 yards, 0:41.**

**Third quarter**

- KC – Travis Kelce 15-yard pass from Alex Smith (Cairo Santos kick), 11:15. Chiefs 21–16. **Drive: 6 plays, 64 yards, 3:45.**
- KC – Cairo Santos 49-yard field goal, 8:07. Chiefs 24–16. **Drive: 4 plays, 3 yards, 1:35.**
- BUF – LeSean McCoy 10-yard pass from Tyrod Taylor (pass failed), 3:11. Chiefs 24–22. **Drive: 9 plays, 70 yards, 4:56.**

**Fourth quarter**

- KC – Cairo Santos 38-yard field goal, 13:00. Chiefs 27–22. **Drive: 10 plays, 59 yards, 5:11.**
- KC – Cairo Santos 37-yard field goal, 3:30. Chiefs 30–22. **Drive: 11 plays, 70 yards, 6:31.**

**Top passers**

- BUF – Tyrod Taylor – 21/38, 291 yards, 3 TD
- KC – Alex Smith – 19/30, 255 yards, 2 TD

**Top rushers**

- BUF – LeSean McCoy – 19 rushes, 70 yards
- KC – Spencer Ware – 19 rushes, 114 yards, TD

**Top receivers**

- BUF – Sammy Watkins – 6 receptions, 158 yards, 2 TD
- KC – Jeremy Maclin – 9 receptions, 160 yards, TD

With the win, Kansas City went to 6–5.

==== Week 13: at Oakland Raiders ====
Week 13: Kansas City Chiefs at Oakland Raiders – Game summary

Quarter	1	2	3	4	Total
**Chiefs**	7	0	7	20	**34**
Raiders	7	7	6	0	**20**

at O.co Coliseum, Oakland, California

- Date: December 6
- Game time: 3:05 p.m. CST/1:05 p.m. PST
- Game weather: Overcast, 57 °F (14 °C)
- Game attendance: 55,010
- Referee: Craig Wrolstad
- TV announcers (CBS): Greg Gumbel, Trent Green and Jamie Erdahl
- Recap, Game Book

Game information

**First quarter**

- OAK – Latavius Murray 2-yard run (Sebastian Janikowski kick), 10:25. Raiders 7–0. **Drive: 9 plays, 80 yards, 4:35.**
- KC – Alex Smith 3-yard run (Cairo Santos kick), 4:58. Tied 7–7. **Drive: 9 plays, 56 yards, 5:27.**

**Second quarter**

- OAK – Michael Crabtree 25-yard pass from Derek Carr (Sebastian Janikowski kick), 0:13. Raiders 14–7. **Drive: 4 plays, 36 yards, 0:40.**

**Third quarter**

- KC – Spencer Ware 10-yard run (Cairo Santos kick), 9:16. Tied 14–14. **Drive: 9 plays, 80 yards, 5:44.**
- OAK – Lee Smith 5-yard pass from Derek Carr (kick failed, hit left upright), 2:12. Raiders 20–14. **Drive: 13 plays, 83 yards, 7:04.**

**Fourth quarter**

- KC – Jeremy Maclin 1-yard pass from Alex Smith (pass failed), 11:17. Tied 20–20. **Drive: 2 plays, 2 yards, 0:41.**
- KC – Jeremy Maclin 13-yard pass from Alex Smith (kick failed, wide right), 7:57. Chiefs 26–20. **Drive: 2 plays, 13 yards, 0:11.**
- KC – Tyvon Branch 38-yard interception return (Alex Smith–Travis Kelce pass), 3:14. Chiefs 34–20.

**Top passers**

- KC – Alex Smith – 16/22, 162 yards, 2 TD
- OAK – Derek Carr – 31/48, 283 yards, 2 TD, 3 INT

**Top rushers**

- KC – Charcandrick West – 9 rushes, 35 yards
- OAK – Latavius Murray – 20 rushes, 86 yards, TD

**Top receivers**

- KC – Jeremy Maclin – 9 receptions, 95 yards, 2 TD
- OAK – Amari Cooper – 4 receptions, 69 yards

With the win, the Chiefs went to 7–5.

==== Week 14: vs. San Diego Chargers ====
Week 14: San Diego Chargers at Kansas City Chiefs – Game summary

Quarter	1	2	3	4	Total
Chargers	0	0	3	0	**3**
**Chiefs**	0	10	0	0	**10**

at Arrowhead Stadium, Kansas City, Missouri

- Date: December 13
- Game time: 12:00 p.m. CST
- Game weather: Cloudy with rain, 61 °F (16 °C)
- Game attendance: 72,314
- Referee: Pete Morelli
- TV announcers (CBS): Andrew Catalon, Steve Beuerlein and Steve Tasker
- Recap, Game Book

Game information

**First quarter**

- No scoring plays.

**Second quarter**

- KC – Albert Wilson 44-yard pass from Alex Smith (Cairo Santos kick), 1:53. Chiefs 7–0. **Drive: 9 plays, 96 yards, 5:23.**
- KC – Cairo Santos 40-yard field goal, 0:02. Chiefs 10–0. **Drive: 4 plays, 39 yards, 0:27.**

**Third quarter**

- SD – Josh Lambo 30-yard field goal, 5:47. Chiefs 10–3. **Drive: 10 plays, 52 yards, 6:22.**

**Fourth quarter**

- No scoring plays.

**Top passers**

- SD – Philip Rivers – 24/43, 263 yards, INT
- KC – Alex Smith – 15/23, 191 yards, TD, INT

**Top rushers**

- SD – Melvin Gordon – 14 rushes, 35 yards
- KC – Charcandrick West – 10 rushes, 54 yards

**Top receivers**

- SD – Antonio Gates – 6 receptions, 76 yards
- KC – Albert Wilson – 4 receptions, 87 yards, TD

With the low-scoring win, the Chiefs went to 8–5 and swept the Chargers for the second straight season.

==== Week 15: at Baltimore Ravens ====
Week 15: Kansas City Chiefs at Baltimore Ravens – Game summary

Quarter	1	2	3	4	Total
**Chiefs**	14	10	0	10	**34**
Ravens	7	7	0	0	**14**

at M&T Bank Stadium, Baltimore, Maryland

- Date: December 20
- Game time: 1:00 p.m. EST/12:00 p.m. CST
- Game weather: Sunny, 41 °F (5 °C)
- Game attendance: 70,791
- Referee: Jeff Triplette
- TV announcers (CBS): Kevin Harlan, Rich Gannon and Chris Fischer
- Recap, Game Book

Game information

**First quarter**

- KC – Charcandrick West 38-yard run (Cairo Santos kick), 9:13. Chiefs 7–0. **Drive: 10 plays, 89 yards, 5:47.**
- BAL – Kyle Juszczyk 1-yard pass from Jimmy Clausen (Justin Tucker kick), 6:30. Tied 7–7. **Drive: 6 plays, 45 yards, 2:43.**
- KC – Tyvon Branch 73-yard fumble return (Cairo Santos kick), 2:49. Chiefs 14–7.

**Second quarter**

- KC – Jeremy Maclin 13-yard pass from Alex Smith (Cairo Santos kick), 14:56. Chiefs 21–7. **Drive: 3 plays, 24 yards, 1:21.**
- KC – Cairo Santos 53-yard field goal, 0:50. Chiefs 24–7. **Drive: 8 plays, 29 yards, 3:16.**
- BAL – Kamar Aiken 48-yard pass from Jimmy Clausen (Justin Tucker kick), 0:00. Chiefs 24–14. **Drive: 5 plays, 72 yards, 0:50.**

**Third quarter**

- No scoring plays.

**Fourth quarter**

- KC – Cairo Santos 32-yard field goal, 6:45. Chiefs 27–14. **Drive: 14 plays, 81 yards, 8:41.**
- KC – Marcus Peters 90-yard interception return (Cairo Santos kick), 4:36. Chiefs 34–14.

**Top passers**

- KC – Alex Smith – 21/25, 171 yards, TD
- BAL – Jimmy Clausen – 26/45, 282 yards, 2 TD, 2 INT

**Top rushers**

- KC – Charcandrick West – 16 rushes, 76 yards, TD
- BAL – Terrance West – 7 rushes, 35 yards

**Top receivers**

- KC – Travis Kelce – 6 receptions, 73 yards
- BAL – Kamar Aiken – 8 receptions, 128 yards, TD

Rookie Marcus Peters would put the dagger into the Ravens, as he returned an interception 90 yards for a touchdown. With the win, the Chiefs went to 9–5 and they finished 5-3 on the road.

==== Week 16: vs. Cleveland Browns ====
Week 16: Cleveland Browns at Kansas City Chiefs – Game summary

Quarter	1	2	3	4	Total
Browns	0	3	7	3	**13**
**Chiefs**	10	7	0	0	**17**

at Arrowhead Stadium, Kansas City, Missouri

- Date: December 27
- Game time: 12:00 p.m. CST
- Game weather: Cloudy, 36 °F (2 °C)
- Game attendance: 69,115
- Referee: Walt Anderson
- TV announcers (CBS): Kevin Harlan and Rich Gannon
- Recap, Game Book

Game information

**First quarter**

- KC – Jeremy Maclin 11-yard pass from Alex Smith (Cairo Santos kick), 7:57. Chiefs 7–0. **Drive: 11 plays, 65 yards, 7:08.**
- KC – Cairo Santos 40-yard field goal, 2:24. Chiefs 10–0. **Drive: 9 plays, 39 yards, 4:43.**

**Second quarter**

- CLE – Travis Coons 45-yard field goal, 9:02. Chiefs 10–3. **Drive: 7 plays, 29 yards, 3:36.**
- KC – Travis Kelce 13-yard pass from Alex Smith (Cairo Santos kick), 0:36. Chiefs 17–3. **Drive: 5 plays, 56 yards, 1:03.**

**Third quarter**

- CLE – Isaiah Crowell 10-yard run (Travis Coons kick), 9:21. Chiefs 17–10. **Drive: 9 plays, 82 yards, 5:45.**

**Fourth quarter**

- CLE – Travis Coons 36-yard field goal, 8:31. Chiefs 17–13. **Drive: 21 plays, 62 yards, 12:01.**

**Top passers**

- CLE – Johnny Manziel – 13/32, 136 yards, INT
- KC – Alex Smith – 15/22, 125 yards, 2 TD, INT

**Top rushers**

- CLE – Johnny Manziel – 11 rushes, 108 yards
- KC – Charcandrick West – 14 rushes, 62 yards

**Top receivers**

- CLE – Gary Barnidge – 3 receptions, 47 yards
- KC – Jeremy Maclin – 5 receptions, 49 yards, TD

The Browns, led by Johnny Manziel, attempted a comeback to put a stop to Kansas City's playoff hopes, but Cleveland did not have any timeouts remaining, and they ultimately ran out of time when Manziel couldn't advance the ball down the field fast enough.

With the win, the Chiefs went to 10–5 (3-1 against the AFC North) and clinched a playoff spot. However, Denver's win over Cincinnati meant the Chiefs failed to clinch the AFC West for the 5th straight season. This was the last time the Chiefs didn't clinch the AFC West until 2025.

==== Week 17: vs. Oakland Raiders ====
Week 17: Oakland Raiders at Kansas City Chiefs – Game summary

Quarter	1	2	3	4	Total
Raiders	0	10	0	7	**17**
**Chiefs**	14	0	9	0	**23**

at Arrowhead Stadium, Kansas City, Missouri

- Date: January 3, 2016
- Game time: 3:25 p.m. CST
- Game weather: Sunny, 37 °F (3 °C)
- Game attendance: 76,114
- Referee: Tony Corrente
- TV announcers (Fox): Kevin Burkhardt, John Lynch and Pam Oliver
- Recap, Game Book

Game information

**First quarter**

- KC – Jeremy Maclin 25-yard pass from Alex Smith (Cairo Santos kick), 10:52. Chiefs 7–0. **Drive: 8 plays, 80 yards, 4:08.**
- KC – Spencer Ware 3-yard run (Cairo Santos kick), 0:51. Chiefs 14–0. **Drive: 12 plays, 87 yards, 6:05.**

**Second quarter**

- OAK – Sebastian Janikowski 29-yard field goal, 13:40. Chiefs 14–3. **Drive: 5 plays, 27 yards, 2:11.**
- OAK – David Amerson 24-yard interception return (Sebastian Janikowski kick), 3:27. Chiefs 14–10.

**Third quarter**

- KC – Punt blocked by D. J. Alexander out of bounds in end zone for a Safety, 9:01. Chiefs 16–10.
- KC – Demetrius Harris 15-yard pass from Alex Smith (Cairo Santos kick), 7:03. Chiefs 23–10. **Drive: 4 plays, 53 yards, 1:58.**

**Fourth quarter**

- OAK – Michael Crabtree 31-yard pass from Derek Carr (Sebastian Janikowski kick), 2:01. Chiefs 23–17. **Drive: 5 plays, 72 yards, 1:14.**

**Top passers**

- OAK – Derek Carr – 21/33, 194 yards, TD, INT
- KC – Alex Smith – 14/24, 156 yards, 2 TD, 2 INT

**Top rushers**

- OAK – Latavius Murray – 11 rushes, 31 yards
- KC – Spencer Ware – 16 rushes, 76 yards, TD

**Top receivers**

- OAK – Clive Walford – 4 receptions, 46 yards
- KC – Jeremy Maclin – 3 receptions, 54 yards, TD

With their 10th straight win, the Chiefs ended their season at 11–5 (5-1 against the AFC West & 6-2 at home). They were the first team to end a season with 10 or more consecutive wins since the 2012 Broncos won 11 in a row to end their season.

=== Standings ===
==== Division ====
AFC West
	W	L	T	PCT	DIV	CONF	PF	PA	STK
^{(1)} Denver Broncos	12	4	0	.750	4–2	8–4	355	296	W2
^{(5)} Kansas City Chiefs	11	5	0	.688	5–1	10–2	405	287	W10
Oakland Raiders	7	9	0	.438	3–3	7–5	359	399	L1
San Diego Chargers	4	12	0	.250	0–6	3–9	320	398	L2

==== Conference ====
AFC
#	Team	Division	W	L	T	PCT	DIV	CONF	SOS	SOV	STK
**Division Leaders**
1 (Note: Denver finished ahead of New England and Cincinnati for the No. 1 seed based on head-to-head sweep. New England finished ahead of Cincinnati for the No. 2 seed based on record vs. common opponents — New England's cumulative record against Buffalo, Denver, Houston and Pittsburgh was 4–1, while Cincinnati's cumulative record against the same four teams was 2–3.)	Denver Broncos	West	12	4	0	.750	4–2	8–4	.500	.479	W2
2	New England Patriots	East	12	4	0	.750	4–2	9–3	.473	.448	L2
3	Cincinnati Bengals	North	12	4	0	.750	5–1	9–3	.477	.406	W1
4	Houston Texans	South	9	7	0	.563	5–1	7–5	.496	.410	W3
**Wild Cards**
5	Kansas City Chiefs	West	11	5	0	.688	5–1	10–2	.496	.432	W10
6 (Note: Pittsburgh finished ahead of the New York Jets for the No. 6 seed and qualified for the last playoff spot based on record vs. common opponents — Pittsburgh's cumulative record against Cleveland, Indianapolis, New England and Oakland was 4–1, while the Jets' cumulative record against the same four teams was 3–2.)	Pittsburgh Steelers	North	10	6	0	.625	3–3	7–5	.504	.463	W1
**Did not qualify for the postseason**
7	New York Jets	East	10	6	0	.625	3–3	7–5	.441	.388	L1
8 (Note: Buffalo finished ahead of Indianapolis based on head-to-head victory.)	Buffalo Bills	East	8	8	0	.500	4–2	7–5	.508	.438	W2
9	Indianapolis Colts	South	8	8	0	.500	4–2	6–6	.500	.406	W2
10	Oakland Raiders	West	7	9	0	.438	3–3	7–5	.512	.366	L1
11	Miami Dolphins	East	6	10	0	.375	1–5	4–8	.469	.469	W2
12 (Note: Jacksonville finished ahead of Baltimore based on head-to-head victory.)	Jacksonville Jaguars	South	5	11	0	.313	2–4	5–7	.473	.375	L3
13	Baltimore Ravens	North	5	11	0	.313	3–3	4–8	.508	.425	L1
14	San Diego Chargers	West	4	12	0	.250	0–6	3–9	.527	.328	L2
15 (Note: Cleveland finished ahead of Tennessee based on head-to-head victory.)	Cleveland Browns	North	3	13	0	.188	1–5	2–10	.531	.271	L3
16	Tennessee Titans	South	3	13	0	.188	1–5	1–11	.492	.375	L4
**Tiebreakers** (Note: When breaking ties for three or more teams under the NFL's rules, they are first broken within divisions, then comparing only the highest ranked remaining team from each division.)

== Postseason ==
=== Schedule ===
Round	Date	Opponent (seed)	Result	Record	Venue	Recap
Wild Card	January 9	at Houston Texans (4)	W 30–0	1–0	NRG Stadium	Recap
Divisional	January 16	at New England Patriots (2)	L 20–27	1–1	Gillette Stadium	Recap

=== Game summaries ===
==== AFC Wild Card Playoffs: at (4) Houston Texans ====
AFC Wild Card Playoffs: (5) Kansas City Chiefs at (4) Houston Texans – Game summary

Quarter	1	2	3	4	Total
Chiefs	7	6	7	10	30
Texans	0	0	0	0	0

at NRG Stadium, Houston, Texas

- Date: January 9, 2016
- Game time: 3:35 p.m. CST
- Game weather: None (retractable roof closed)
- Game attendance: 71,800
- Referee: Ronald Torbert
- TV announcers (ESPN/ABC): Mike Tirico, Jon Gruden and Lisa Salters
- Recap, Game Book

Game information

First quarter

- KC – Knile Davis 106-yard kickoff return (Cairo Santos kick), 14:49. Chiefs 7–0.

Second quarter

- KC – Cairo Santos 49-yard field goal, 12:50. Chiefs 10–0. Drive: 5 plays, 27 yards, 2:30.
- KC – Cairo Santos 49-yard field goal, 7:06. Chiefs 13–0. Drive: 6 plays, 40 yards, 3:29.

Third quarter

- KC – Chris Conley 9-yard pass from Alex Smith (Cairo Santos kick), 4:35. Chiefs 20–0. Drive: 11 plays, 94 yards, 5:23.

Fourth quarter

- KC – Spencer Ware 5-yard run (Cairo Santos kick), 14:56. Chiefs 27–0. Drive: 8 plays, 71 yards, 4:13.
- KC – Cairo Santos 33-yard field goal, 3:59. Chiefs 30–0. Drive: 4 plays, 6 yards, 2:13.

Top passers

- KC – Alex Smith – 17/22, 190 yards, TD, INT
- HOU – Brian Hoyer – 15/34, 136 yards, 4 INT

Top rushers

- KC – Spencer Ware – 16 rushes, 67 yards, TD
- HOU – Alfred Blue – 17 rushes, 99 yards

Top receivers

- KC – Travis Kelce – 8 receptions, 128 yards
- HOU – DeAndre Hopkins – 6 receptions, 69 yards

The Texans, who won the AFC South division with a 9–7 record, were completely crushed by the Chiefs. The Chiefs were the first team since the 2006 Bears to score a kick return touchdown on the opening play of the playoffs, when Knile Davis returned the opening kick 106 yards for a touchdown. After that, the game started to slow down, with both teams going three-and-out before a string of turnovers, Eric Berry's interception of Brian Hoyer, Brian Cushing's interception of Alex Smith two plays later, and a Hoyer fumble recovered by Dontari Poe on the ensuing drive. The Chiefs made a field goal on the drive, and although the team was able to get to the 2-yard line, a negative run by J. J. Watt and another interception by Hoyer ended the Texans' closest chance at scoring in the entire game. Although the Texans' defense forced a three-and-out, Hoyer threw his third interception to Marcus Peters on the second play of their drive.

The win was Kansas City’s first playoff win since 1993, ironically in The Astrodome. This was also the Chiefs last shutout win until 2025.

==== AFC Divisional Playoffs: at (2) New England Patriots ====
AFC Divisional Playoffs: (5) Kansas City Chiefs at (2) New England Patriots – Game summary

Quarter	1	2	3	4	Total
Chiefs	3	3	7	7	20
Patriots	7	7	7	6	27

at Gillette Stadium, Foxborough, Massachusetts

- Date: January 16, 2016
- Game time: 4:35 p.m. EST/3:35 p.m. CST
- Game weather: Partly cloudy, 38 °F (3 °C)
- Game attendance: 66,829
- Referee: Craig Wrolstad
- TV announcers (CBS): Ian Eagle, Dan Fouts and Evan Washburn
- Recap, Game Book

Game information

First quarter

- NE – Rob Gronkowski 8-yard pass from Tom Brady (Stephen Gostkowski kick), 10:23. Patriots 7–0. Drive: 11 plays, 80 yards, 4:37.
- KC – Cairo Santos 34-yard field goal, 1:52. Patriots 7–3. Drive: 17 plays, 64 yards, 8:31.

Second quarter

- NE – Tom Brady 1-yard run (Stephen Gostkowski kick), 3:23. Patriots 14–3. Drive: 11 plays, 98 yards, 5:36.
- KC – Cairo Santos 32-yard field goal, 0:12. Patriots 14–6. Drive: 11 plays, 52 yards, 3:11.

Third quarter

- NE – Rob Gronkowski 16-yard pass from Tom Brady (Stephen Gostkowski kick), 8:24. Patriots 21–6. Drive: 5 plays, 69 yards, 2:07.
- KC – Albert Wilson 10-yard pass from Alex Smith (Cairo Santos kick), 2:12. Patriots 21–13. Drive: 12 plays, 80 yards, 6:12.

Fourth quarter

- NE – Stephen Gostkowski 40-yard field goal, 14:46. Patriots 24–13. Drive: 8 plays, 57 yards, 2:26.
- NE – Stephen Gostkowski 32-yard field goal, 10:20. Patriots 27–13. Drive: 5 plays, 19 yards, 2:06.
- KC – Charcandrick West 1-yard run (Cairo Santos kick), 1:13. Patriots 27–20. Drive: 16 plays, 80 yards, 5:16.

Top passers

- KC – Alex Smith – 29/50, 246 yards, TD
- NE – Tom Brady – 28/42, 302 yards, 2 TD

Top rushers

- KC – Charcandrick West – 17 rushes, 61 yards, TD
- NE – Steven Jackson – 6 rushes, 16 yards

Top receivers

- KC – Jason Avant – 4 receptions, 69 yards
- NE – Julian Edelman – 10 receptions, 100 yards

The Chiefs, who had won 11 straight, travelled to Gillete Stadium to face the Patriots, who had advanced to the AFC Championship for the last five years. The Patriots scored first blood with a Rob Gronkowski touchdown catch, followed by a Cairo Santos field goal for Kansas City. The pattern was duplicated in the second quarter, with Tom Brady rushing for a score before Santos kicked another field goal. In the third quarter, after Gronkowski scored his second TD, Alex Smith threw his first to Albert Wilson. The Patriots responded with two fourth-quarter field goals to make the score 27–13 with 10:20 left. Although the Chiefs engineered a touchdown drive late in the game, the drive took up over 5 minutes, and the Chiefs had to force a three-and-out (with three timeouts) to have a chance. On second down, when Brady threw the ball instead of running it to waste time, the ball was batted and miraculously caught by Julian Edelman for a first down, ending the game.
