= Chris Conley (American football) =

American football player (born 1992)

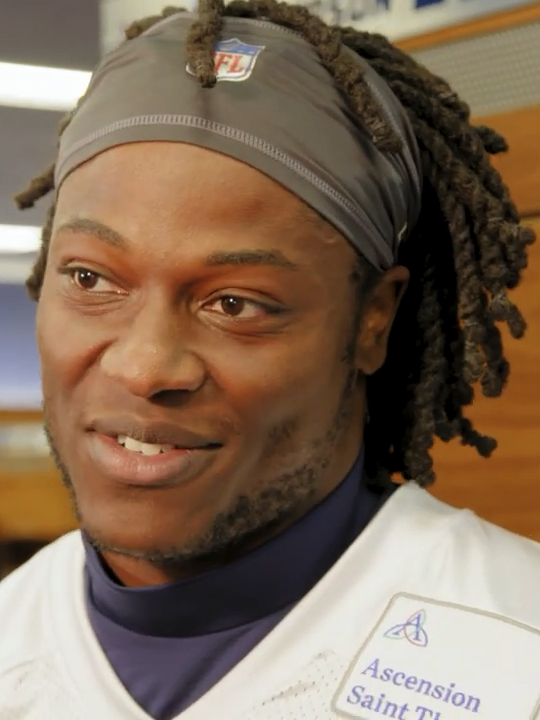
- Conley with the Tennessee Titans in 2022

No. 17, 18, 19, 84
- Position: Wide receiver

Personal information
- Born: October 25, 1992 (age 34); Adana, Turkey
- Listed height: 6 ft 3 in (1.91 m)
- Listed weight: 205 lb (93 kg)

Career information
- High school: North Paulding (Dallas, Georgia, U.S.)
- College: Georgia (2011–2014)
- NFL draft: 2015: 3rd round, 76th overall pick

Career history
- Kansas City Chiefs (2015–2018); Jacksonville Jaguars (2019–2020); Houston Texans (2021–2022); Kansas City Chiefs (2022)*; Tennessee Titans (2022); San Francisco 49ers (2023–2024)
- * Offseason or practice squad member only

Career NFL statistics
- Receptions: 226
- Receiving yards: 2,998
- Receiving touchdowns: 15
- Stats at Pro Football Reference

Christian Conley (born October 25, 1992) is an American former professional football player who was a wide receiver in the National Football League (NFL). He played college football for the Georgia Bulldogs and was selected in the third round of the 2015 NFL draft by the Kansas City Chiefs. Conley has also played for the Jacksonville Jaguars, Houston Texans, Tennessee Titans, and San Francisco 49ers.

== Early life ==
Conley was born in Adana, Turkey, at Incirlik Air Base and spent most of his early life on USAF bases due to his father being in the United States Air Force. He was raised as a devout Christian and was named Christian at birth. During elementary school, Conley won a regional third grade science fair where he received a $5,000 savings bond, a trip with his family to nationals in Chicago, Illinois, and was able to meet television personality and master carpenter Bob Vila. He began playing football during his freshman year at North Paulding High School in Dallas, Georgia. He received numerous accolades at North Paulding, including being an All-state chorus member.

== College ==
Conley arrived at Georgia a semester early in January 2011 and played four years under head coach Mark Richt before graduating and entering the 2015 NFL draft. He finished his freshman season with 16 receptions for 288 yards and two touchdowns in 11 games. As a sophomore in 2012, Conley had 20 receptions for 342 yards and six touchdowns in 14 games. As a junior in 2013, Conley caught a career-high 45 passes for 651 yards and four touchdowns in 11 games. As a senior in 2014, Conley finished with 36 receptions for 657 yards and a career-high eight touchdowns.

== Professional career ==
=== Pre-draft ===
On January 17, 2015, Conley caught two passes for 45 yards in the NFLPA Collegiate Bowl in Carson, California and was a part of Mike Martz's National team that defeated the American team 17–0. Conley was one of 47 collegiate wide receivers to attend the NFL Scouting Combine in Indianapolis, Indiana. He had an impressive performance and tied for third among wide receivers in the 40-yard dash and finished fourth among them in the bench press. His broad jump was best among his position group with the second closest being Auburn's Sammie Coates (10'9"). On March 18, 2015, he attended Georgia's pro day, along with Todd Gurley, Amarlo Herrera, Damian Swann, Ramik Wilson, and 13 other prospects. Team representatives and scouts from 25 NFL teams attended, that included Tennessee Titans head coach Ken Whisenhunt, as Conley opted to stand on his combine numbers and only perform positional drills. Throughout the draft process, he met with a few teams for private workouts and meetings, including the Philadelphia Eagles, Dallas Cowboys, and Cleveland Browns. At the conclusion of the pre-draft process, Conley was projected to be a third round pick by NFL draft experts and scouts. He was ranked as the 13th best wide receiver in the draft by NFLDraftScout.com. He held the NFL Combine record for the highest vertical leap of 45 inches until 2026, when Eli Stowers broke it with a leap of 45.5 inches.

Pre-draft measurables
Height	Weight	Arm length	Hand span	Wingspan	40-yard dash	10-yard split	20-yard split	20-yard shuttle	Three-cone drill	Vertical jump	Broad jump	Bench press
6 ft 1 7/8 in (1.88 m)	213 lb (97 kg)	33 3/4 in (0.86 m)	9 7/8 in (0.25 m)	6 ft 9 in (2.06 m)	4.35 s	1.52 s	2.54 s	4.30 s	7.06 s	45 in (1.14 m)	11 ft 7 in (3.53 m)	18 reps
All values from NFL Combine

=== Kansas City Chiefs (first stint) ===
==== 2015 ====
The Kansas City Chiefs selected Conley in the third round (76th overall) of the 2015 NFL draft. He was the 12th wide receiver selected in 2015. On May 14, 2015, the Chiefs signed Conley to a four-year, $3.12 million contract that includes a signing bonus of $712,434.

Throughout his first training camp, Conley competed against De'Anthony Thomas, Jason Avant, Frankie Hammond, and Albert Wilson for the No. 2 wide receiver role. Conley suffered an injury during training camp after having a strong start in OTA's. Head coach Andy Reid named Conley the fifth wide receiver on the depth chart, behind Jeremy Maclin, Albert Wilson, Jason Avant, and De'Anthony Thomas.

He made his professional regular season debut in the Chiefs' season-opening 27–20 victory over the Houston Texans. On September 28, 2015, Conley caught his first career reception on a 16-yard pass by Alex Smith before being tackled by Green Bay Packers safety Haha Clinton-Dix in the fourth quarter of a 38–28 loss. The following week, he earned his first career start after Albert Wilson was unable to play due to a recurring shoulder injury. Conley finished the 36–21 loss at the Cincinnati Bengals with two receptions for 53 yards. On October 25, 2015, Conley caught a season-high six passes for 63 receiving yards and a touchdown during the Chiefs' 23–13 win against the Pittsburgh Steelers. He made his first career touchdown reception on a six-yard pass from Alex Smith in the fourth quarter to seal the Chiefs' victory. He finished his rookie season in 2015 with 17 receptions for 199 receiving yards and one touchdown in 16 games and five starts.

The Chiefs finished second in the AFC West with an 11–5 record and received a playoff berth as a wildcard team. On January 9, 2016, Conley played in his first career playoff game and caught one pass for a nine-yard touchdown during the Chiefs' 30–0 American Football Conference (AFC) Wild Card round victory over the Texans. The following game, Conley caught five passes for 33 yards as the Chiefs lost 27–20 to the New England Patriots in the AFC Divisional Round playoff game.

==== 2016 ====
Conley returned to training camp in 2016 and competed for the job as the No. 2 wide receiver against Albert Wilson, Frankie Hammond, De'Anthony Thomas, Rod Streater, and Tyreek Hill. Conley was named the No. 3 wide receiver behind Jeremy Maclin and Albert Wilson to start the regular season.

Conley started the Chiefs' season-opener against the San Diego Chargers and caught four passes for 43 yards during their 33–27 victory. On October 2, 2016, Conley made a season-high six receptions for 70 receiving yards in the Chiefs' 43–14 loss at the Steelers. In his first season under offensive coordinators Brad Childress and Matt Nagy, Conley made 44 receptions for 530 receiving yards in 16 games and 11 starts. The Chiefs finished the 2016 season atop the AFC West and received a playoff berth before being eliminated by the Pittsburgh Steelers in the AFC Divisional Round. Conley started the 18–16 loss and was limited to two receptions for 19 yards.

==== 2017 ====
Throughout training camp, Conley competed for the No. 1 wide receiver position after Jeremy Maclin was released to free up cap space on June 2, 2017. He competed against Tyreek Hill, Albert Wilson, De'Anthony Thomas, and Demarcus Robinson. Head coach Andy Reid named him the starting wide receiver, alongside Tyreek Hill, to begin the 2017 season.

He started the Chiefs' season-opener at the Patriots and made two receptions for 43 yards during their 42–27 victory. The following week, he caught a season-high four passes for 55 yards as the Chiefs defeated the Eagles 27–20. On October 8, 2017, Conley caught three passes for 46 receiving yards before leaving after suffering an achilles injury. The injury occurred when Conley landed after jumping to recover an onside kick in the fourth quarter of their 42–34 victory at the Texans on Sunday Night Football On October 14, 2017, the Chiefs officially placed Conley on injured/reserve with a ruptured achilles that effectively ended his season. In five games and five starts, Conley caught 11 passes for 175 receiving yards.

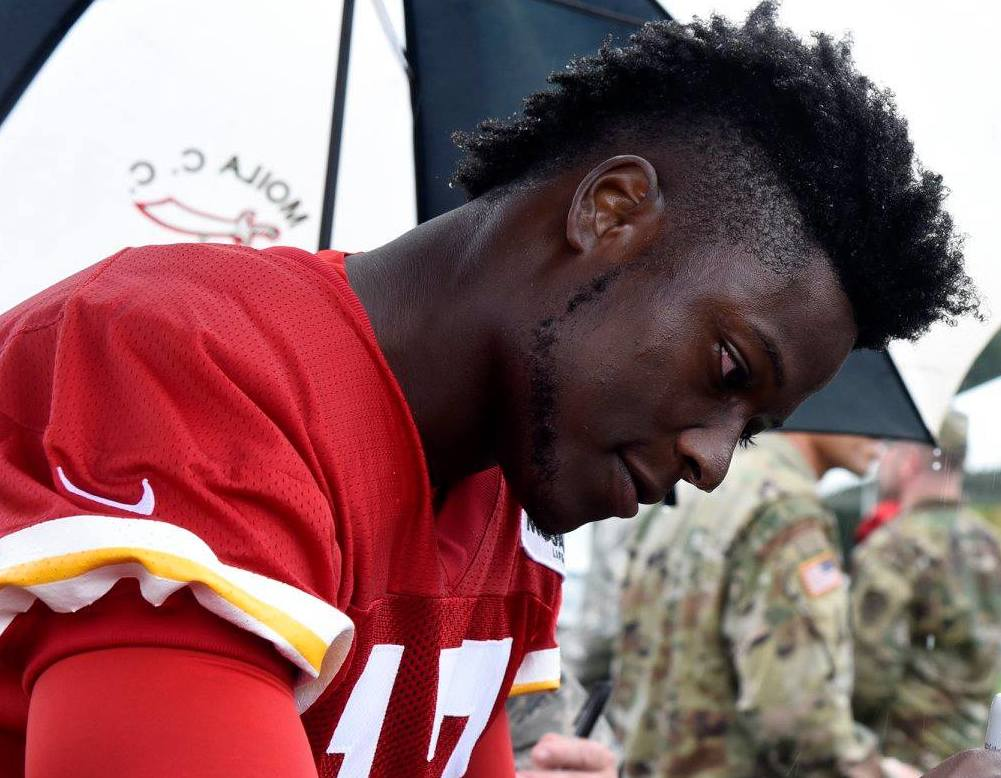
Conley in 2018

==== 2018 ====
In Week 11, against the Rams, Conley had two touchdowns in the 54–51 loss. In the 2018 season, he appeared in all 16 games and recorded 32 receptions for 334 yards and five touchdowns.

=== Jacksonville Jaguars ===
Conley signed with the Jacksonville Jaguars on March 16, 2019. On August 31, 2019, Conley was placed on the final 53-man roster for the Jaguars. Conley made his debut with the Jaguars in Week 1 against his former team, the Chiefs. In the game, Conley caught six passes for 97 yards and a touchdown as the Jaguars lost 40–26. In Week 8 against the New York Jets, Conley caught four passes for 103 yards, including a 70-yard touchdown, in the 29–15 victory . In Week 15 against the Oakland Raiders, Conley caught four passes for 49 yards and two touchdowns from Gardner Minshew late in the fourth quarter of the 20–16 comeback victory, which were also the final two touchdowns ever scored in Oakland Coliseum. Overall, Conley finished the 2019 season with 47 receptions for 775 receiving yards and five receiving touchdowns. In the 2020 season, Conley appeared in 15 games and started four. He had 40 receptions for 471 receiving yards and two touchdowns.

=== Houston Texans ===
On March 29, 2021, Conley signed a one-year contract with the Texans. He played in 16 games and started ten for the Texans. He recorded 22 receptions for 323 receiving yards and two receiving touchdowns.

On March 23, 2022, Conley re-signed with the Texans. He was released on August 30, 2022, and re-signed to the practice squad. He was released on October 4, 2022.

=== Kansas City Chiefs (second stint) ===
Conley was signed to the Chiefs' practice squad on October 6, 2022.

=== Tennessee Titans ===
On October 25, 2022, Conley was signed by the Titans off the Chiefs practice squad. He was waived on November 16, 2022. He was re-signed to the practice squad five days later. He was signed back to the active roster on December 10, 2022. In seven games for Tennessee in the 2022 season, Conley caught four of five targets for 46 yards in nine games and one start.

=== San Francisco 49ers ===
On April 17, 2023, Conley signed a one-year contract with the San Francisco 49ers. He was released on August 29, 2023, and re-signed to the practice squad. He was promoted to the active roster on December 9. He had three catches for 69 yards on the season, all coming in Week 18 against the Rams. The 49ers reached Super Bowl LVIII where the 49ers lost 25–22 to Conley’s former team Kansas City Chiefs. In the Super Bowl, Conley had one catch for 18 yards and made multiple plays on special teams.

On March 16, 2024, Conley re-signed with the 49ers to a one-year contract. He appeared in 15 games, contributing on offense and special teams. He had six receptions for 76 yards.

Conley announced his retirement on June 7, 2025 after ten seasons.

== Career statistics ==
=== NFL ===
Legend
**Bold**	Career high

==== Regular season ====
Year	Team	Games		Receiving					
Year	Team	GP	GS	Tgt	Rec	Yds	Avg	Lng	TD
2015	KC	**16**	5	31	17	199	11.7	44	1
2016	KC	**16**	11	69	44	530	12.0	39	0
2017	KC	5	5	16	11	175	15.9	35	0
2018	KC	**16**	13	52	32	334	10.4	27	**5**
2019	JAX	**16**	**14**	**90**	**47**	**775**	16.5	**70**	**5**
2020	JAX	15	4	63	40	471	11.8	51	2
2021	HOU	**16**	10	37	22	323	14.7	41	2
2022	HOU	2	0	2	0	0	0.0	0	0
2022	TEN	7	1	5	4	46	11.5	27	0
2023	SF	8	0	6	3	69	**23.0**	48	0
2024	SF	2	0	2	1	4	4.0	4	0
Career		118	63	372	221	2,926	13.2	70	15

==== Postseason ====
Year	Team	Games		Receiving					
Year	Team	GP	GS	Tgt	Rec	Yds	Avg	Lng	TD
2015	KAN	2	0	**10**	**6**	**42**	7.0	16	**1**
2016	KAN	1	**1**	3	2	19	9.5	12	0
2018	KAN	2	**1**	3	0	0	0.0	0	0
2023	SF	**3**	0	2	2	35	**17.5**	**18**	0
Career		8	2	18	10	96	9.6	18	1

=== College ===
Season	Team	Receiving				
Season	Team	Rec	Yds	Avg	Lng	TD
2011	Georgia	16	288	18.0	47	2
2012	Georgia	20	342	17.1	87	6
2013	Georgia	40	651	14.5	43	4
2014	Georgia	36	657	18.3	48	8
Career		112	1,938	17.3	224	20

== Personal life ==
Conley has two siblings and was raised by his parents Christina and Charles Conley. His mother is a high school teacher and his father was in the Air Force.

Conley is a fan of superheroes, citing Superman movies as one of his favorites to watch and DC Comics as his favorite. Conley is close with former Chiefs' teammate Jeremy Maclin and is a fan of the TV show Game of Thrones and the Star Wars franchise.

While at the University of Georgia, Conley wrote, directed, and starred in a Star Wars fan-film Retribution. During his time at Georgia, Conley served two terms on the Southeastern Conference and the NCAA Student-Athlete Advisory Committees. He graduated from Georgia in December 2014 with a degree in journalism.
