= Jarrod Pughsley =

American football player (born 1990)

No. 60
- Position: Offensive guard

Personal information
- Born: December 18, 1990 (age 35); Oakland, California, U.S.
- Listed height: 6 ft 4 in (1.93 m)
- Listed weight: 310 lb (141 kg)

Career information
- High school: Lima (Lima, Ohio)
- College: Akron (2009–2013)
- NFL draft: 2014: undrafted

Career history
- Dallas Cowboys (2014)*; Kansas City Chiefs (2014–2016); Baltimore Ravens (2016–2017)*
- * Offseason or practice squad member only

Awards and highlights
- Third-team All-MAC (2013)

Career NFL statistics
- Games played: 2
- Stats at Pro Football Reference

Jarrod Wesley Pughsley (born December 18, 1990) is an American former professional football player who was an offensive guard for the Kansas City Chiefs of the National Football League (NFL). He played football and basketball at Lima Senior High School in Lima, Ohio. He was a four-year letterman playing college football for the Akron Zips. Pughsley was named third-team All-MAC his senior year in 2013. He played in 35 games, and started 23 of them, during his college career. After going undrafted in the 2014 NFL draft, he signed with the Dallas Cowboys. However, Pughsley suffered an injury and was released in July 2014. He was then a member of the Chiefs from 2014 to 2016, spending the majority of the time on the practice squad. He played in two regular season games and one playoff game for the Chiefs in 2015. Pughsley was signed to the Baltimore Ravens' practice squad in November 2016 and was released by the team before the start of the 2017 regular season.

== Early life ==
Pughsley was born in Oakland, California, and moved to Ohio before he was three months old.

He played high school football at Lima Senior High School in Lima, Ohio as an offensive lineman and was on the varsity team his final two seasons. Pughsley was named second-team All-Northwest District in his junior year and first-team All-Northwest District in his senior year. He also played basketball at Lima High and helped the team finish with a 19–6 record during the 2008–09 season.

He graduated in 2009. He received offers from Division II schools but instead decided to walk on at Akron. Pughsley's jersey number was retired by Lima Senior High School in February 2016, making him the youngest person to have their number retired by the school.

== College career ==
Pughsley was a four-year letterman for the Akron Zips of the University of Akron from 2010 to 2013. He was redshirted in 2009. He joined Akron as a walk on. He earned a full football scholarship in 2011.

He played in ten games at offensive tackle in 2010. The following year, Pughsley played in the final two games of the year and made a start at left guard in the season finale. He had missed the rest of the 2011 season due to injury. Pughsley played in 11 games, and started ten of those, in 2012. He started eight games at left tackle and two at left guard.

He played in 12 games, all starts at left tackle, in 2013 and earned third-team All-MAC honors. He was also one of eight recipients of the team's Harry "Doc" Smith Award, which is given to the "outstanding player in each class on offense and defense." Pughsley received the award as the outstanding senior on offense. He was also one of three recipients of the team's Captains Award. Pughsley was the team captain on offense his senior year.

During his college career, he played in 35 games, and started 23 of them.

== Professional career ==
Pughsley was rated the 61st best offensive tackle in the 2014 NFL draft by NFLDraftScout.com. Gil Brandt of NFL.com said that Pughsley was an "offensive line prospect who could be a project-type player in the NFL".

Pre-draft measurables
Height	Weight	40-yard dash	10-yard split	20-yard split	20-yard shuttle	Three-cone drill	Vertical jump	Broad jump	Bench press	Wonderlic
6 ft 4 in (1.93 m)	308 lb (140 kg)	5.29 s	1.71 s	3.05 s	4.69 s	8.20 s	30 in (0.76 m)	9 ft 0 in (2.74 m)	34 reps	30
All values from Akron Pro Day

=== Dallas Cowboys ===
Pughsley signed with the Dallas Cowboys in May 2014 after going undrafted in the 2014 NFL Draft. On May 22, he was waived/injured by the Cowboys after suffering a torn biceps that required surgery. He reverted to injured reserve on May six days later. On July 23, 2014, he was released by the team with an injury settlement.

=== Kansas City Chiefs ===
Pughsley was signed to the Kansas City Chiefs' practice squad on October 21, 2014. He was released by the Chiefs on November 5, signed to the team's practice squad on November 10, released on November 15, signed to the practice squad on November 19, released on November 26, signed to the practice squad on November 29, released on December 6, signed to the practice squad on December 13, released on December 20 and signed to the practice squad on December 26. Pughsley signed a reserve/future contract with the Chiefs on December 30, 2014.

Pughsley was released by the Chiefs on September 5, 2015, and signed to the team's practice squad on September 8, 2015. He was promoted to the active roster on December 8. He played in two regular season games for the Chiefs during the 2015 season. He also played in the Chiefs' Divisional round playoff game against the New England Patriots on January 16, 2016.

Pughsley was released by the Chiefs on September 3, 2016. He was signed to the team's practice squad on September 4, 2016. He was released by the Chiefs on November 8, 2016.

=== Baltimore Ravens ===
On November 15, 2016, Pughsley was signed to the Baltimore Ravens' practice squad. He signed a reserve/future contract with the Ravens on January 2, 2017. He was waived during final roster cutdowns on September 1, 2017.

== Coaching career ==
Pughsley has spent time as a high school football coach. He has also spent time instructing youth football camps. He founded "Jarrod Pughsley's Offensive Line Academy" in 2022.

== Personal life ==
Pughsley's nickname is "Pugs". While at the University of Akron, he was a member of the school's Student Athlete Advisory Council executive board.
