= Fred Williams (wide receiver) =

American football player (born 1988)

No. 8, 11, 83
- Position: Wide receiver

Personal information
- Born: April 15, 1988 (age 38)
- Listed height: 6 ft 0 in (1.83 m)
- Listed weight: 190 lb (86 kg)

Career information
- High school: South Division (Milwaukee)
- College: St. Cloud State
- NFL draft: 2011: undrafted

Career history
- San Jose SaberCats (2011–2013); Kansas City Chiefs (2013–2015)*; Los Angeles KISS (2016); Washington Valor (2017)*; Arizona Rattlers (2017)
- * Offseason or practice squad member only

Career AFL statistics
- Receptions: 155
- Receiving yards: 1,903
- Receiving touchdowns: 33
- Return yards: 1,201
- Return touchdowns: 3
- Stats at ArenaFan.com
- Stats at Pro Football Reference

Fred Williams (born April 15, 1988) is an American former football wide receiver. He played college football at St. Cloud State University and attended South Division High School in Milwaukee, Wisconsin. He played for the San Jose SaberCats of the Arena Football League (AFL) from 2011 to 2013. He also was on the Kansas City Chiefs' practice squad off and on from 2013 to 2015.

== Professional career ==
Williams was rated the 234th best wide receiver in the 2011 NFL draft by NFLDraftScout.com.

=== San Jose Sabercats ===
Williams was signed by the San Jose SaberCats on November 17, 2011. He played for the Sabercats during the 2012 and 2013 Arena Football League seasons.

=== Kansas City Chiefs ===
Williams signed with the Kansas City Chiefs on December 18, 2013. He was released by the Chiefs on August 30, 2014. He was signed to the Chiefs' practice squad on September 2, 2014. Williams was released by the Chiefs on September 5, 2015 and signed to the team's practice squad on September 6, 2015. He was released by the Chiefs on October 1, 2015 and signed to the team's practice squad on October 19, 2015. He was released by the Chiefs on October 24 and signed to the practice squad on October 28, 2015. On January 18, 2016, the Chiefs signed Williams to a future/reserve contract. Williams was released by the Chiefs on May 4, 2016.

=== Los Angeles KISS ===
On July 7, 2016, Williams was assigned to the Los Angeles KISS.

=== Washington Valor ===
On October 14, 2016, Williams was selected by the Washington Valor during the dispersal draft. On February 20, 2017, he was placed on league suspension.

=== Arizona Rattlers ===
On February 9, 2017, Williams signed with the Arizona Rattlers of the Indoor Football League (IFL).
