= Ramik Wilson =

American football player (born 1992)

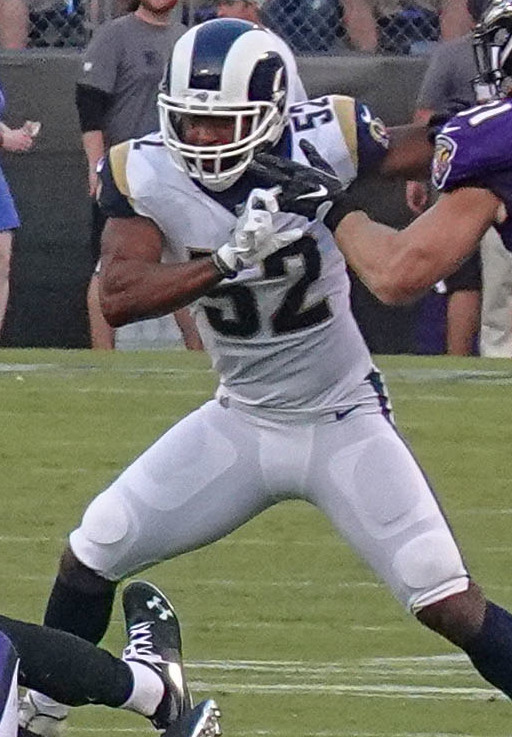
- Wilson with the Los Angeles Rams in 2018

No. 53, 52, 51
- Position: Linebacker

Personal information
- Born: August 19, 1992 (age 34); Tampa, Florida, U.S.
- Listed height: 6 ft 2 in (1.88 m)
- Listed weight: 238 lb (108 kg)

Career information
- High school: Thomas Jefferson (Tampa)
- College: Georgia
- NFL draft: 2015: 4th round, 118th overall pick

Career history
- Kansas City Chiefs (2015–2017); Los Angeles Rams (2018); Jacksonville Jaguars (2019)*; Arizona Cardinals (2019); Carolina Panthers (2019)
- * Offseason or practice squad member only

Awards and highlights
- First-team All-SEC (2013); Second-team All-SEC (2014)

Career NFL statistics
- Total tackles: 147
- Forced fumbles: 2
- Fumble recoveries: 5
- Interceptions: 1
- Defensive touchdowns: 2
- Stats at Pro Football Reference

Ramik Wilson (born August 19, 1992) is an American former professional football player who was a linebacker in the National Football League (NFL). He played college football for the Georgia Bulldogs.

== Early life ==
Wilson attended Jefferson High School in Tampa, Florida, where he played football and ran track. In football, he played linebacker, tight end and punter. As a junior, he recorded 92 tackles, nine sacks and two interceptions. As a senior, he recorded 90 tackles, 18 sacks and six forced fumbles on defense, and also caught 19 passes for 258 yards and five touchdowns on offense. In track & field, Wilson competed as a sprinter, running the 200-meter dash, and as a shot putter and discus thrower. In addition, he also bench-pressed 350 pounds and squatted 470 pounds.

Regarded as a four-star recruit by Rivals.com, Wilson was ranked as the No. 229 player in the country, No. 58 player in Florida and No. 12 linebacker. According to Scout.com, he was rated a three-star recruit, and was ranked as the No. 27 outside linebacker in the country. He committed to play college football at the University of Georgia in January 2011.

== College career ==
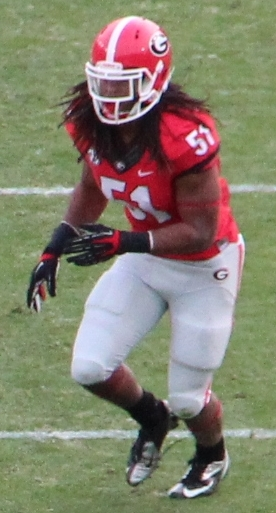
Wilson with Georgia in 2013

Wilson was a backup his first two seasons at Georgia. He appeared in 18 games, recording 10 tackles. As a junior in 2013, Wilson was a first year starter, starting 12 of 13 games. He finished the season with a Southeastern Conference (SEC)-leading 133 tackles and also had four sacks. He was named a first-team All-SEC selection for his play.

== Professional career ==
Pre-draft measurables
Height	Weight	Arm length	Hand span	40-yard dash	10-yard split	20-yard split	20-yard shuttle	Three-cone drill	Vertical jump	Broad jump	Bench press
6 ft 2 in (1.88 m)	237 lb (108 kg)	33 in (0.84 m)	10 5/8 in (0.27 m)	4.77 s	1.65 s	2.76 s	4.51 s	7.39 s	35 in (0.89 m)	9 ft 3 in (2.82 m)	23 reps
All values from NFL Combine/Georgia's Pro Day

=== Kansas City Chiefs ===
The Kansas City Chiefs selected Wilson in the fourth round (118th overall) of the 2015 NFL draft. He was the 12th linebacker selected in 2015. On May 11, 2015, the Chiefs signed him to a four-year, $2.80 million contract.

Ramik recovered a fumble for his first NFL touchdown against the Chicago Bears on October 11, 2015.

On September 4, 2016, he was waived by the Chiefs. The next day, he was signed to the Chiefs practice squad. He was promoted to the active roster on October 18, 2016.

=== Los Angeles Rams ===
On March 22, 2018, Wilson signed a one-year contract with the Los Angeles Rams. He played in 16 games with four starts, recording 35 combined tackles, two passes defensed and a forced fumble.

=== Jacksonville Jaguars ===
On May 1, 2019, Wilson signed with the Jacksonville Jaguars. He was released during final roster cuts on August 30, 2019.

=== Arizona Cardinals ===
On October 9, 2019, Wilson was signed by the Arizona Cardinals. On October 22, 2019, Wilson was cut by the Cardinals.

=== Carolina Panthers ===
On December 11, 2019, Wilson was signed by the Carolina Panthers. He was released on December 21.

== NFL career statistics ==
Legend
**Bold**	Career high

=== Regular season ===
Year	Team	Games		Tackles					Interceptions					Fumbles			
Year	Team	GP	GS	Cmb	Solo	Ast	Sck	TFL	Int	Yds	TD	Lng	PD	FF	FR	Yds	TD
2015	KAN	10	2	20	13	7	0.0	**6**	0	0	0	0	0	0	1	0	**1**
2016	KAN	11	**11**	**76**	**61**	**15**	0.0	3	**1**	**6**	0	**6**	**3**	**1**	**2**	0	0
2017	KAN	8	4	16	14	2	0.0	3	0	0	0	0	0	0	1	**11**	**1**
2018	LAR	**16**	4	35	26	9	0.0	3	0	0	0	0	2	**1**	1	0	0
2019	ARI	1	0	0	0	0	0.0	0	0	0	0	0	0	0	0	0	0
		46	21	147	114	33	0.0	15	1	6	0	6	5	2	5	11	2

=== Playoffs ===
Year	Team	Games		Tackles					Interceptions					Fumbles			
Year	Team	GP	GS	Cmb	Solo	Ast	Sck	TFL	Int	Yds	TD	Lng	PD	FF	FR	Yds	TD
2015	KAN	1	0	0	0	0	0.0	0	0	0	0	0	0	0	0	0	0
2016	KAN	1	**1**	**15**	**8**	**7**	0.0	**1**	0	0	0	0	0	0	0	0	0
2018	LAR	**3**	0	0	0	0	0.0	0	0	0	0	0	0	0	0	0	0
		5	1	15	8	7	0.0	1	0	0	0	0	0	0	0	0	0
