= Jeremy Maclin =

American football player (born 1988)

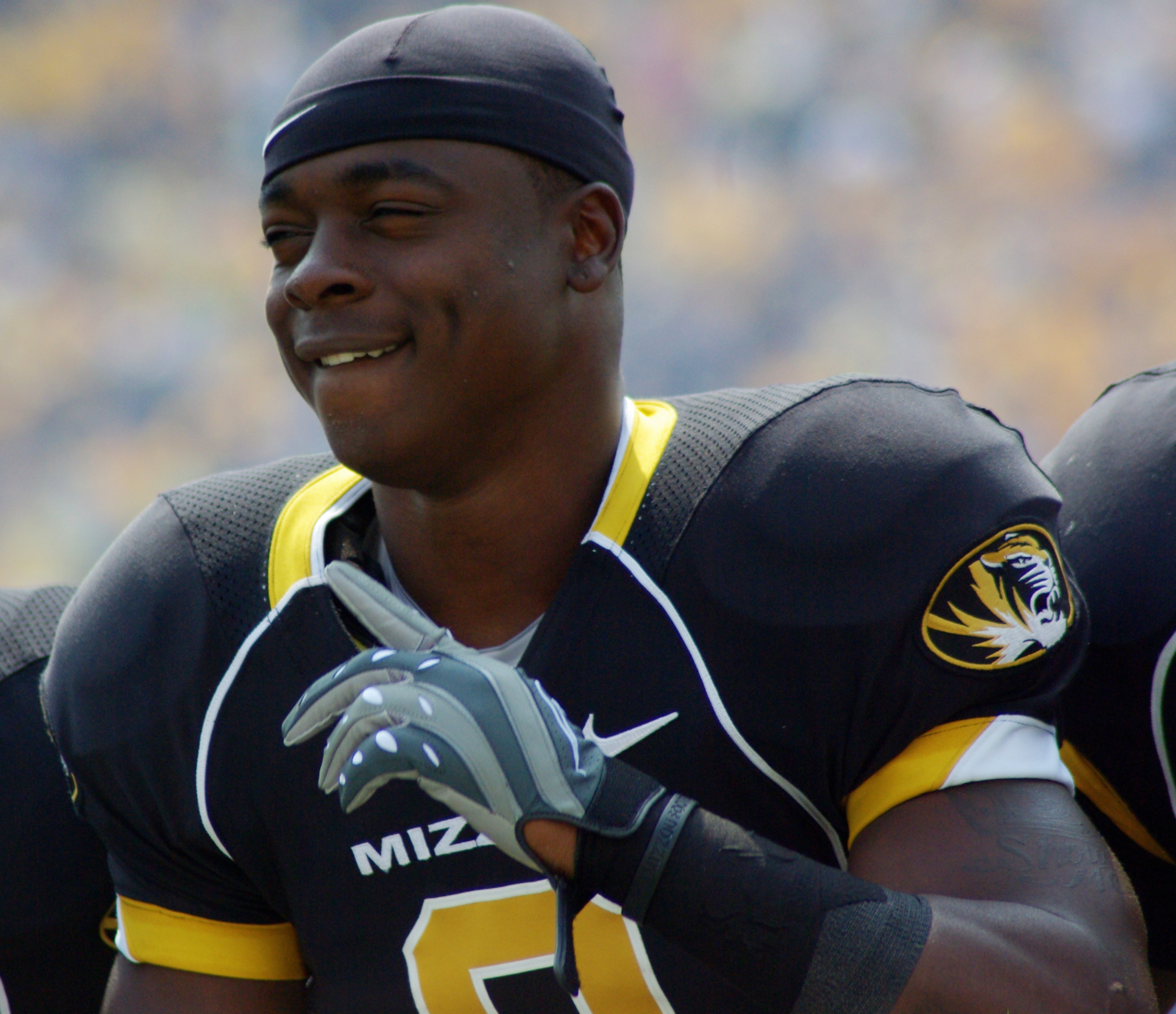
- Maclin while at Missouri in 2008

No. 18, 19
- Position: Wide receiver

Personal information
- Born: May 11, 1988 (age 38); Kirkwood, Missouri, U.S.
- Listed height: 6 ft 0 in (1.83 m)
- Listed weight: 198 lb (90 kg)

Career information
- High school: Kirkwood
- College: Missouri (2006–2008)
- NFL draft: 2009: 1st round, 19th overall pick

Career history

Playing
- Philadelphia Eagles (2009–2014); Kansas City Chiefs (2015–2016); Baltimore Ravens (2017)

Coaching
- Kirkwood High School Offensive assistant (2019–2021); Kirkwood High School Head coach (2021–present)

Awards and highlights
- Pro Bowl (2014); 2× Consensus All-American (2007, 2008); Big 12 Co-Offensive Freshman of the Year (2007); 2× First-team All-Big 12 (2007, 2008)

Career NFL statistics
- Receptions: 514
- Receiving yards: 6,835
- Receiving touchdowns: 49
- Stats at Pro Football Reference
- College Football Hall of Fame

Jeremy Maclin (born May 11, 1988) is an American former professional football player who was a wide receiver in the National Football League (NFL) for eight seasons. He played college football for the Missouri Tigers, twice earning consensus All-American honors. Maclin was selected by the Philadelphia Eagles in the first round of the 2009 NFL draft and earned a Pro Bowl selection in 2014. He also played for the Kansas City Chiefs and Baltimore Ravens.

== Early life ==
Maclin was born in Kirkwood, Missouri. He attended Kirkwood High School in Kirkwood, Missouri from 2002 to 2006, where he was a letterman in football and basketball.

== College career ==
Maclin attended the University of Missouri, where he played on coach Gary Pinkel's Missouri Tigers football team from 2006 to 2008. He played as a wide receiver, punt and kick return specialist for the Missouri Tigers in 2007 and 2008. He holds the NCAA freshman record for most all-purpose yards in a single season. His yardage totals in four categories were: 307 punt returning, 375 rushing, 1,039 kickoff returning, and 1,055 receiving for a total of 2,776 yards; an average of 198.3 yards per game in his 14 games.

=== 2007 season ===
Maclin was named as a consensus first-team All-American as a wide receiver and as an All-Purpose player. Maclin, paired with Heisman Trophy finalist quarterback Chase Daniel, helped lead the Missouri Tigers to a 12–2 record and victory in the 2008 Cotton Bowl Classic. Maclin also gained All-America selections on various other teams as a kick returner. He finished his All-American season with 80 receptions and 16 touchdowns.

=== 2008 season ===
Maclin began his second season with the Tigers with high expectations and possible consideration for the Heisman Trophy. In the Tigers’ season-opener against the Illinois Fighting Illini, he returned a kickoff for a touchdown but left the game with an ankle injury. He had four receptions for 31 yards and a touchdown. The next game, against Southeast Missouri State, Maclin caught only two passes for 20 yards and a touchdown. Maclin was also involved in a trick play, however, in which quarterback Chase Daniel lined up at wide receiver and Maclin lined up at quarterback. Maclin threw a lateral to Daniel, who threw down field for a touchdown. Maclin recorded six receptions for 172 yards and three touchdowns against Nevada.

Maclin led all of major-college football in all-purpose yards per game with 202.36 (2,833 yds. in 14 games), over 15 yards more than second-place Jahvid Best (187.25) of California. He had 1,260 receiving, 1,010 kickoff return, 293 rushing, and 270 punt returns yardage for 2,833 all-purpose yards.

Maclin was named to the Associated Press All-American as a wide receiver, and he was once again named to the first-team as the All-Purpose player.

== Professional career ==
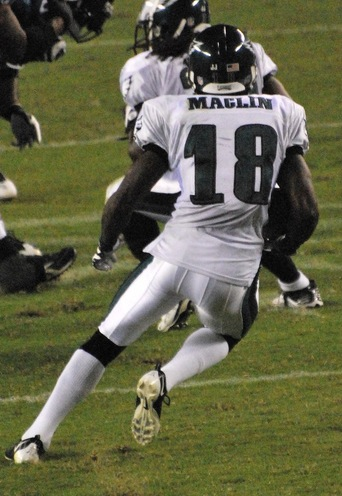
Maclin with the Eagles in 2009

=== Pre-draft ===
Maclin was considered a top National Football League prospect following his second season at Missouri, and roommate Sean Weatherspoon hoped to convince Maclin to return for his junior year instead of leaving Missouri for the 2009 NFL draft. Weatherspoon's efforts were unsuccessful, and on January 9, 2009, Maclin declared for the 2009 NFL Draft. Draft analyst Mel Kiper Jr. projected Maclin to go to the Oakland Raiders with the tenth pick in the first round of the NFL Draft, Maclin's personal best in the 40-yard dash was 4.31 seconds, but he wanted to lower that to 4.29 seconds in the NFL Scouting Combine in Indianapolis. He tripped and fell during a passing drill at the NFL Scouting Combine on February 22, 2009, hyperextending his left knee, and wasn't running at full speed, but previously to his fall, unofficially ran the 40-yard dash in 4.34 seconds and 4.4 seconds that morning. He ran the 40-yard dash at the NFL Scouting Combine in 4.45 sec., but the earlier unofficial times conflicted with other reports that said he ran the dash first in 4.34 seconds and then 4.44 seconds. After originally believing he had to get an MRI on his injured left knee, it was reported he would not need one as the knee was healthy by the end of the Combine. He also had a sore right hip because of the fall, but that also proved to be minor. Maclin scored very high for a wide receiver on the Wonderlic Test with a score of 25, compared to the normal score of 18 for wide receivers.

Pre-draft measurables
Height	Weight	Arm length	Hand span	40-yard dash	10-yard split	20-yard split	20-yard shuttle	Three-cone drill	Vertical jump	Broad jump	Wonderlic
6 ft 0 1/8 in (1.83 m)	198 lb (90 kg)	32 1/4 in (0.82 m)	9 1/4 in (0.23 m)	4.43 s	1.54 s	2.58 s	4.25 s	7.06 s	35.5 in (0.90 m)	10 ft 0 in (3.05 m)	25
All values from NFL Combine/Pro Day

=== Philadelphia Eagles ===
==== 2009 season ====
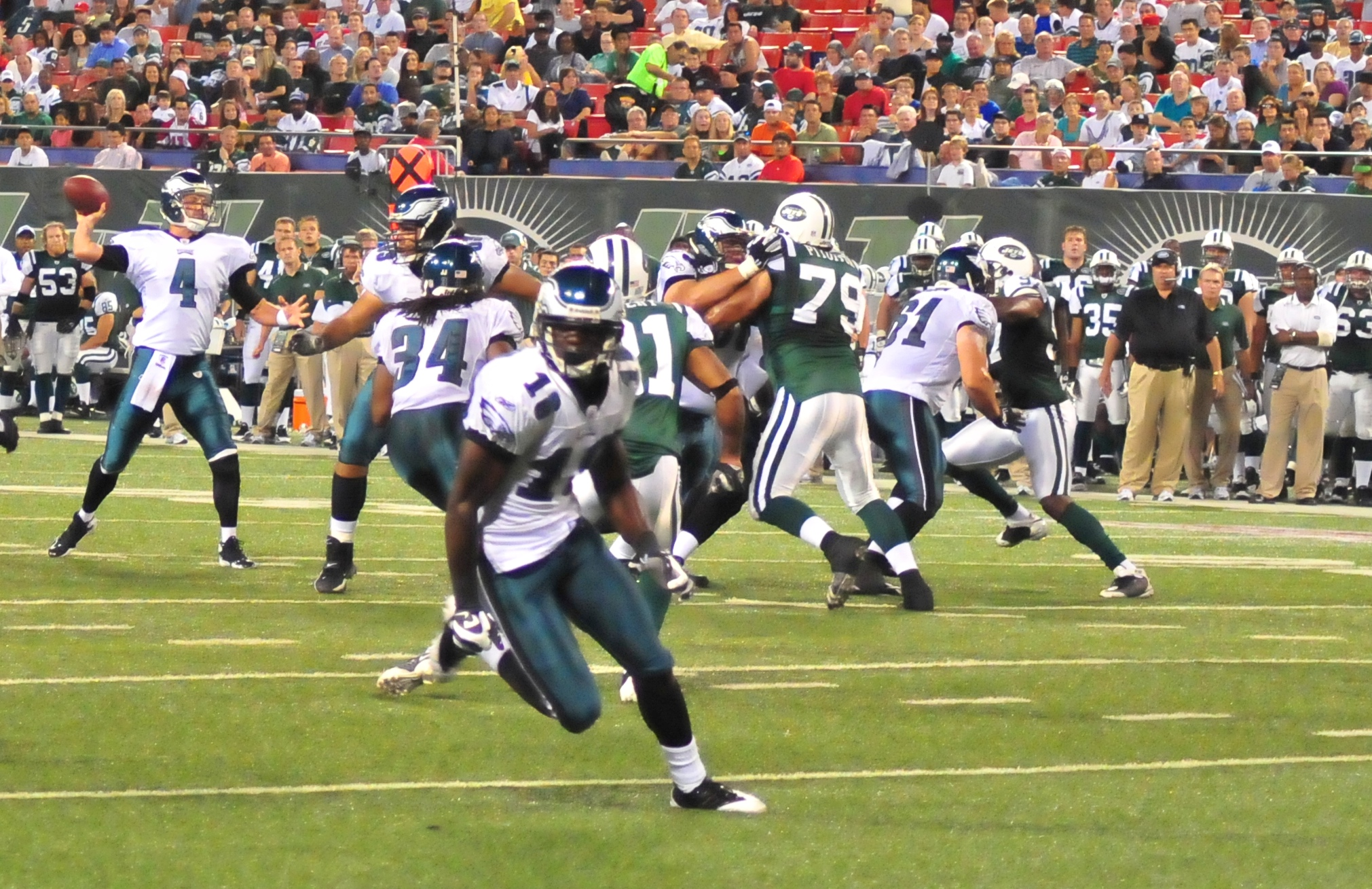
Maclin with the Philadelphia Eagles during the 2009 preseason

Maclin dropped further than expected in the draft, but was eventually chosen by the Philadelphia Eagles in the first round with the 19th overall pick. Maclin was the third receiver to be selected in the draft, behind Darrius Heyward-Bey, who went seventh overall to the Oakland Raiders, and Michael Crabtree, who went tenth overall to the San Francisco 49ers.

On August 3, after eight days of disagreements with the Eagles front office, Maclin signed a five-year, $15.5 million deal ($9.5 million guaranteed).

Maclin started in his first NFL game on September 27, 2009, against the Kansas City Chiefs in week 3 in place of the injured Kevin Curtis. He caught four passes for 33 yards in that game.

On October 11, 2009, Maclin scored his first NFL career touchdown on a 51-yard reception from Donovan McNabb as the Philadelphia Eagles beat the Tampa Bay Buccaneers 33–14. Maclin also recorded his second NFL touchdown reception later in the game.

On December 27, 2009, in a home game against the Denver Broncos and with the score tied 27–27, Maclin made a decisive catch on the sideline to extend a crucial late drive for the Eagles. McNabb threw a tight spiral to the sideline and Maclin caught it while toeing the line. Initially the catch was ruled incomplete, but upon further review was ruled a catch and first down. Three plays later, Eagles kicker David Akers kicked the game-winning field goal, sealing victory for Philadelphia by a score of 30–27. Maclin finished with 6 catches for 92 yards. For this he received Rookie of the Week honors.

On January 9, 2010, in the Wild Card Round against the Dallas Cowboys, Maclin became the youngest player to score a touchdown in NFL postseason history, aged 21 years and 243 days. In the second quarter, he caught a 76-yard touchdown pass from Michael Vick, which was the longest career touchdown pass of Vick's career and Maclin's longest career touchdown catch. With 146 yards, Maclin broke the Eagles record for receiving yards in a playoff game, breaking Keith Jackson's record of 142 yards set during the 1988 NFC Divisional Game against the Chicago Bears.

==== 2010 season ====
On August 3, 2010, Maclin was carted off the training camp practice field with a leg injury. Further evaluation showed that he suffered a bone bruise. Maclin returned to the field later in the season to catch 70 passes for 964 yards the longest for 83 yards. He also scored 10 touchdowns. In the 2010 season, Maclin led the league in Red Zone receiving touchdowns with 7, tying New York Giants wide receiver and NFC East rival Hakeem Nicks. He also rushed for 36 yards on 3 carries, making his combined rushing and receiving total exactly 1,000 yards.

==== 2011 season ====
Maclin was placed on the active/non-football illness list on August 3, 2011. On August 5, head coach Andy Reid said that he expected Maclin to be healthy for the regular season. It was revealed on August 17 that Maclin was held out of training camp because of a lymphoma scare. An inflammatory virus was determined as the cause of the symptoms he showed and he did not have cancer. He was activated from the active/non-football illness list on August 27. In Week 2, Maclin caught 13 passes with 171 yards and 2 touchdowns but lost to the Atlanta Falcons by a score of 31–35. Overall, he finished the 2011 season with 63 receptions for 859 receiving yards and three receiving touchdowns.

==== 2012 season ====
During the 2012 season, Maclin recorded 69 receptions for 857 yards and seven touchdowns. He had a season-high 130 receiving yards and a receiving touchdown in a 26–23 overtime loss to the Detroit Lions in Week 6.

==== 2013 season ====
On July 27, 2013, Maclin suffered a torn ACL during training camp and was forced to miss the entire 2013 season. On July 30, 2013, Maclin was officially placed on the injured reserve list.

==== 2014 season ====
On February 28, 2014, it was announced that Maclin would sign a one-year deal that will keep him on the Eagles roster throughout the 2014 season. The deal was for $6 million with $3.5 million guaranteed. Since the release of DeSean Jackson, as well as a disappointing season by 2013 starter Riley Cooper, Maclin's role on the team had increased as the first-choice receiver. In Week 3, against the Washington Redskins, he had eight receptions for 154 receiving yards and a touchdown in the 37–34 victory. In Week 8, against the Arizona Cardinals, he had a season-high 187 receiving yards and two touchdowns in the 24–20 loss. He followed that up with 158 receiving yards and two receiving touchdowns in the 31–21 victory over the Houston Texans. He earned NFC Offensive Player of the Week for his game against Houston. He led the team in yards (1,318) and receptions (85), both career highs, as well as touchdowns (10), through the 2014 NFL season. He also had no fumbles for the first time since 2009. On January 16, 2015, Maclin was added to the Pro Bowl as an alternate replacing an injured Denver Broncos wide receiver Demaryius Thomas. He was ranked 61st by his fellow players on the NFL Top 100 Players of 2015.

=== Kansas City Chiefs ===
==== 2015 season ====
On March 11, 2015, Maclin signed a five–year, $55 million contract with the Kansas City Chiefs, reuniting with former Eagles head coach Andy Reid. Maclin started out slow, but had eight receptions for 141 yards in a Week 3 matchup against the Packers, where he became the first Chiefs wide receiver to catch a touchdown pass since 2013. Although he slowed down at midseason, he bounced back, catching for 160 yards and a touchdown in a Week 12 matchup against the Bills, followed by 95 yards and 2 touchdowns against the Oakland Raiders. He finished strong, catching a touchdown in the last three games of the season. He finished the season with a career-high 87 catches for 1,088 receiving yards and eight touchdowns.

The Chiefs, who had gone 11–5 after winning 10 straight, advanced to the playoffs. In a 30–0 shutout of the Houston Texans, Maclin started out slow, but started to get into a rhythm in the 3rd quarter, with 3 catches for 29 yards, before he suffered a high ankle sprain that kept him out for the rest of the game. Maclin, who many thought wouldn't play at all against the New England Patriots in the divisional round, was listed as active, but he played very limited snaps and was taken out almost entirely after the first half, finishing with 2 catches on 3 targets for 23 yards.

Maclin was ranked as the 93rd best player in the NFL by his fellow players on the NFL Top 100 Players of 2016.

==== 2016 season ====
Hampered by a torn groin, Maclin missed four games in the 2016 regular season. He started only 12 games for career lows of 44 receptions, 536 yards, and two touchdowns.

On June 2, 2017, Maclin was released by the Chiefs.

=== Baltimore Ravens ===
On June 13, 2017, the Baltimore Ravens signed Maclin to a two-year, $11 million contract, which included $6 million the first year.

On September 10, in the season opening 20–0 victory over the Cincinnati Bengals, Maclin, in his Ravens debut, recorded his first touchdown with the team, which was a 48-yard reception from quarterback Joe Flacco. He finished the season with 40 receptions for 440 yards and three touchdowns.

On March 14, 2018, Maclin was released by the Ravens.

=== Retirement ===
On March 24, 2019, Maclin announced his retirement.

== Career statistics ==
=== NFL ===
==== Regular season ====
Year	Team	GP	Receiving							Fumbles	
Year	Team	GP	Rec	Tgt	Yards	Avg	Lng	TD	FD	Fum	Lost
2009	PHI	15	56	91	773	13.8	56	4	34	0	0
2010	PHI	16	69	116	964	13.8	83	10	45	1	1
2011	PHI	13	63	97	859	13.6	59	5	43	1	1
2012	PHI	15	69	122	857	12.4	70	7	36	1	1
2014	PHI	16	85	143	1,318	15.5	72	10	56	0	0
2015	KC	15	87	124	1,088	12.5	61	8	49	2	1
2016	KC	12	44	76	536	12.2	44	2	29	0	0
2017	BAL	12	40	72	440	11.0	48	3	23	0	0
Career		114	514	841	6,835	13.3	83	49	315	5	4

==== Playoffs ====
Year	Team	Games		Receiving					
Year	Team	GP	GS	Tgt	Rec	Yds	Avg	Lng	TD
2009	PHI	1	1	12	7	146	20.9	76	1
2010	PHI	1	1	7	3	73	24.3	44	0
2015	KC	2	2	7	5	52	11.5	16	0
2016	KC	1	1	4	2	28	14.0	20	0
Career		5	5	30	17	299	17.6	76	1

=== College ===
Punt returns								Kick returns					
Year	G	No.	Yds	TD	Long	Avg	Avg/G	No.	Yds	TD	Long	Avg	Avg/G
2007	14	25	307	2	66	12.3	21.9	43 *	1,039 *	1	99	24.2	74.2
2008	14	23	270	1	75	11.7	19.3	42	1,010	1	99	24.0	72.1
TOTAL	28	48	577	3 *	75	12.0	20.6	85 *	2,049 *	2 *	99	24.1	73.2

Rushing								Receiving					
Year	G	No.	Yds	TD	Long	Avg	Avg/G	No.	Yds	TD	Long	Avg	Avg/G
2007	14	51	375	4	30	7.4	26.8	80	1,055	9	82	13.2	75.4
2008	14	40	293	2	56	7.3	20.9	102 *	1,260 *	13 *	80	12.4	90
TOTAL	28	91	668	6	56	7.3	23.9	182	2,315	22	82	12.7	82.7

All-purpose (Yds.)								Scoring (Pts.)					
Year	G	Rushing	Receiving	Punt Ret.	K Ret.	Total	Avg/G	TD	Rush	Receive	Ret.	Total	Avg/G
2007	14	375	1,055	307	1,039	2,776 +	198.3	16	4	9	3	96	6.9
2008	14	293	1,260	270	1,010	2,833 *	202.4	17	2	13	2	102	7.3
TOTAL	28	668	2,315	577	2,049	5,609 *	200.3	33	6	22	5	198	7.1

* school record
+ NCAA freshman record

== Personal life ==
While with the Philadelphia Eagles, Maclin was a resident of West Deptford Township, New Jersey. On May 20, 2017, Maclin married Adia Kuzma. The couple has two daughters and a son.

In 2021, Maclin was named head football coach at Kirkwood High School in Kirkwood, Missouri.
