= D. J. Alexander =

American football player (born 1991)

No. 57, 58
- Position: Linebacker

Personal information
- Born: September 30, 1991 (age 35); Palm Desert, California, U.S.
- Listed height: 6 ft 2 in (1.88 m)
- Listed weight: 233 lb (106 kg)

Career information
- High school: Palm Desert
- College: Oregon State (2011–2014)
- NFL draft: 2015: 5th round, 172nd overall pick

Career history
- Kansas City Chiefs (2015–2016); Seattle Seahawks (2017); Philadelphia Eagles (2018); Jacksonville Jaguars (2019)

Awards and highlights
- Pro Bowl (2016)

Career NFL statistics
- Total tackles: 51
- Forced fumbles: 1
- Fumble recoveries: 1
- Stats at Pro Football Reference

Donell James Alexander (born Donell James Welch; September 30, 1991) is an American former professional football player who was a linebacker in the National Football League (NFL). He played college football for the Oregon State Beavers and was selected by the Kansas City Chiefs in the fifth round of the 2015 NFL draft.

== College career ==
Alexander was recruited to Oregon State and grayshirted his freshman year to focus on academics. He ended up becoming a three-year starter for the Beavers. He was frequently injured as a junior and underwent a neck surgery after the season. Alexander enjoyed a bounce-back senior year, recording 70 tackles with 12 tackles for loss and four sacks in 2014

== Professional career ==
=== Kansas City Chiefs ===
Alexander was selected in the fifth round with the 172nd pick of the 2015 NFL draft by the Kansas City Chiefs despite not being invited to the NFL Combine. A good showing at Oregon State pro day prompted the Chiefs to select him.

As a rookie in 2015, Alexander played all 16 games making 16 tackles and a forced fumble.

Having little expectations at regular snaps, Alexander performed better at special teams. He finished the 2016 season by playing 16 games with one start. He was named to his first Pro Bowl as a special teamer.

=== Seattle Seahawks ===
On July 28, 2017, Alexander was traded to the Seattle Seahawks in exchange for Kevin Pierre-Louis.

On September 1, 2018, Alexander was waived by the Seahawks.

=== Philadelphia Eagles ===
On September 2, 2018, Alexander was claimed off waivers by the Philadelphia Eagles.

=== Jacksonville Jaguars ===
On May 1, 2019, Alexander signed with the Jacksonville Jaguars. He was placed on injured reserve on October 22, 2019, with a foot injury.

== Personal life ==
In 2012, he legally changed his last name from Welch to Alexander, in honor of his stepfather.
