= Frankie Hammond =

American football player (born 1990)

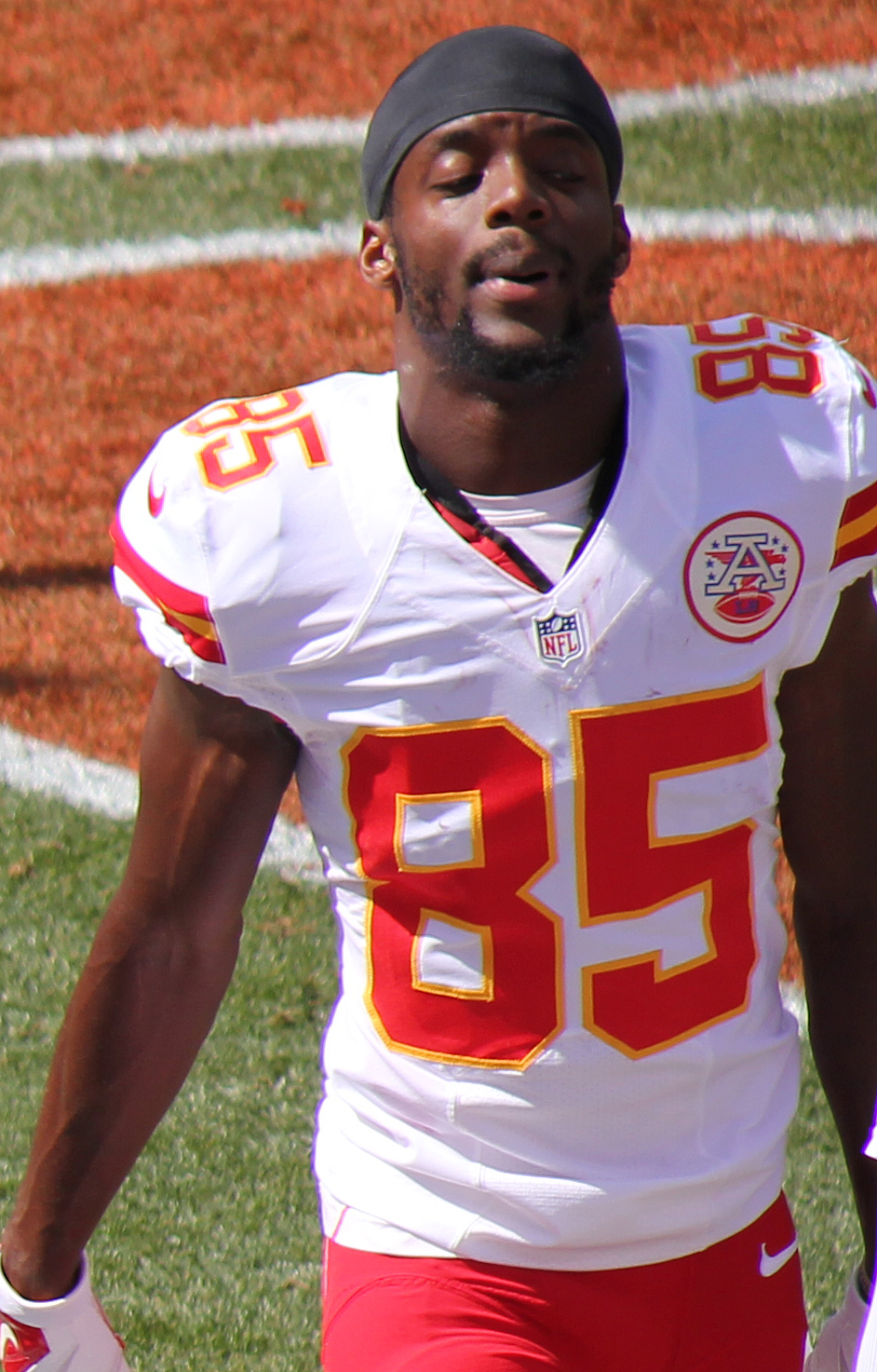
- Hammond with the Kansas City Chiefs in 2014

No. 85
- Position: Wide receiver

Personal information
- Born: February 17, 1990 (age 36); Hallandale Beach, Florida, U.S.
- Listed height: 6 ft 1 in (1.85 m)
- Listed weight: 184 lb (83 kg)

Career information
- High school: Hallandale (Hallandale Beach)
- College: Florida
- NFL draft: 2013: undrafted

Career history
- Kansas City Chiefs (2013–2016); New York Jets (2017)*; Orlando Apollos (2019)*
- * Offseason or practice squad member only

Career NFL statistics
- Receptions: 4
- Receiving yards: 45
- Return yards: 389
- Stats at Pro Football Reference

Frankie Hammond Jr. (born February 17, 1990) is an American former professional football player who was a wide receiver in the National Football League (NFL). He played college football for the Florida Gators and was signed by the Kansas City Chiefs as an undrafted free agent in 2013.

== College career ==
Hammond accepted an athletic scholarship to attend the University of Florida, where he played for coach Urban Meyer and coach Will Muschamp's Florida Gators football teams from 2008 to 2012. During his four-season college career, he started 19 of 48 games in which he played, recording 63 receptions for 809 yards and six touchdowns. He was also a high jumper for the Florida Gators track and field team.

== Professional career ==
=== Kansas City Chiefs ===
Hammond signed with the Kansas City Chiefs as an undrafted free agent after the 2013 NFL draft. He spent the entire season on the Chiefs practice squad. After spending the entire 2013 season on the Chiefs' practice squad, he debuted in Week 1 of the 2014 season, recording his first NFL career reception for 22 yards. Through the whole season, Hammond had 4 catches for 45 yards. On April 20, 2015, he was re-signed. On November 9, 2015, he was waived. On November 9, 2015, he was signed to the practice squad. On November 28, 2015, he was elevated to the active roster.

On September 3, 2016, Hammond was released by the Chiefs. The next day, he was signed to the Chiefs' practice squad.

=== New York Jets ===
On January 23, 2017, Hammond signed a reserve/future contract with the New York Jets. On September 2, 2017, he was waived by the Jets.

=== Orlando Apollos ===
In 2018, Hammond signed with the Orlando Apollos for the 2019 season.

== See also ==
- List of Florida Gators in the NFL draft
