= 2016 Kansas City Chiefs season =

NFL team season

- Owner: The Hunt family (Clark Hunt Chairman and CEO)
- General manager: John Dorsey
- Head coach: Andy Reid
- Offensive coordinator: Brad Childress; Matt Nagy
- Defensive coordinator: Bob Sutton
- Home stadium: Arrowhead Stadium

Results
- Record: 12–4
- Division place: 1st AFC West
- Playoffs: Lost Divisional Playoffs (vs. Steelers) 16–18
- All-Pros: 5: TE Travis Kelce (1st team); CB Marcus Peters (1st team); S Eric Berry (1st team); PR Tyreek Hill (1st team); RT Mitchell Schwartz (2nd team)
- Pro Bowlers: 7: QB Alex Smith; TE Travis Kelce; CB Marcus Peters; SS Eric Berry; P Dustin Colquitt; RS Tyreek Hill; ST D. J. Alexander
- Team MVP: Eric Berry
- Team ROY: Tyreek Hill

Uniform
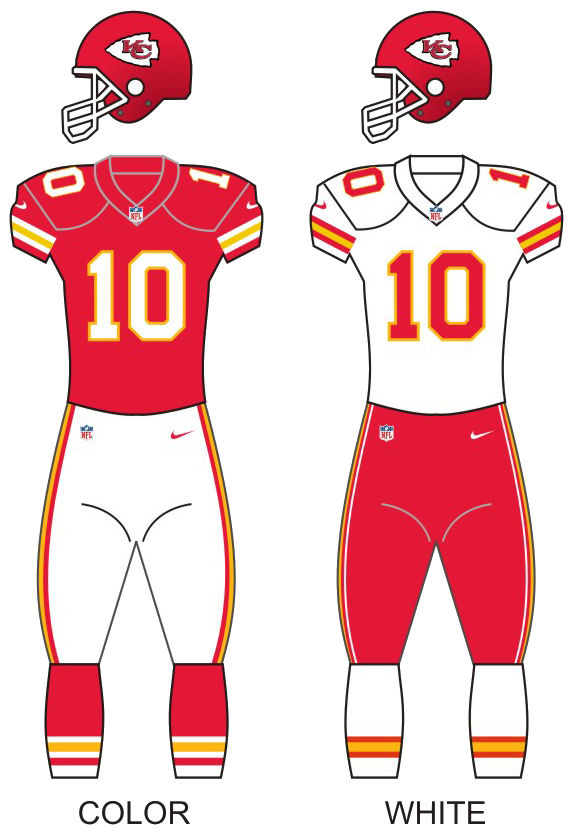

The 2016 season was the Kansas City Chiefs' 47th in the National Football League (NFL), their 57th overall and their fourth under head coach Andy Reid and the final season under general manager John Dorsey, who was fired on June 22, 2017. The Chiefs clinched their first AFC West division title since 2010, beginning a streak of nine consecutive that extended to 2024. The Chiefs also clinched a first-round bye for the first time since 2003, but they lost to the Pittsburgh Steelers in the Divisional round 18–16 despite holding them to no touchdowns.

== Violation of anti-tampering policy ==
On March 9, 2016, the NFL announced that the Chiefs had violated the league's anti-tampering policy while pursuing wide receiver Jeremy Maclin during the 2015 off-season. The NFL defines tampering as prospective teams contacting soon-to-be free agents before NFL policies allow, which is two days prior to the beginning of the new league year. As punishment, the Chiefs forfeited their 2016 third-round selection, a 2017 sixth-round selection, and were fined $250,000. In addition, head coach Andy Reid was fined $75,000, and general manager John Dorsey was fined $25,000. The Chiefs immediately appealed the decision believing the punishment was excessively harsh and inconsistent with punishments that have given to other teams in similar situations. On April 19, the NFL denied the Chiefs appeal, however, they did reduce the team's fine to $200,000 and Reid's fine to $60,000.

== NFL Top 100 ==
The Chiefs had an NFL best 9 players in the annual Top 100 Players countdown.

Rank	Player	Position	Change
26	Justin Houston	LB	▲1
55	Eric Berry	S	NR
65	Marcus Peters	CB	NR
75	Jamaal Charles	RB	▼63
80	Derrick Johnson	LB	NR
81	Alex Smith	QB	NR
84	Tamba Hali	LB	▼14
91	Travis Kelce	TE	NR
93	Jeremy Maclin	WR	NR

== Roster changes ==
=== Offseason ===
Reserve/future free agent contracts

Player	Position
Tyrell Adams	LB
Da'Ron Brown	WR
Deveron Carr	CB
Kenny Cook	WR
Dominique Davis	DE
Reid Fragel	T
Laurence Gibson	T
Cameron Gordon	OLB
Jordan Kovacs	SS
Keith Lewis	CB
Michael Liedkte	G
Trey Millard	FB
Jimmy Staten	DE
Alameda Ta'amu	NT
Ross Travis	TE
Fred Williams	WR

Retirements

Position	Player	Seasons with the Chiefs	Years pro	Date announced
FS	Husain Abdullah	3	7	March 28
DE	Mike DeVito	3	9	April 11

Free agents

Position	Player	Status*	2015 Team(s)	2016 Team
T	Jeff Allen	UFA	Kansas City Chiefs	Houston Texans
WR	Jason Avant	UFA	Kansas City Chiefs	None
FS	Eric Berry	UFA	Kansas City Chiefs	Kansas City Chiefs
SS	Tyvon Branch	UFA	Kansas City Chiefs	Arizona Cardinals
SS	Stevie Brown	UFA	New York Giants	Kansas City Chiefs
CB	Marcus Cooper	UFA	Kansas City Chiefs	Kansas City Chiefs
QB	Chase Daniel	UFA	Kansas City Chiefs	Philadelphia Eagles
S	Akeem Davis	UFA	New Orleans Saints; Seattle Seahawks; Indianapolis Colts	Kansas City Chiefs
G	Jordan Devey	UFA	San Francisco 49ers	Kansas City Chiefs
CB	Jamell Fleming	UFA	Kansas City Chiefs	Kansas City Chiefs
LB	Tamba Hali	UFA	Kansas City Chiefs	Kansas City Chiefs
DE	Jaye Howard	UFA	Kansas City Chiefs	Kansas City Chiefs
LB	Derrick Johnson	UFA	Kansas City Chiefs	Kansas City Chiefs
WR	Seantavius Jones	UFA	New Orleans Saints	Kansas City Chiefs
LB	Tautvydas Kieras	UFA	None	Kansas City Chiefs
DE	David King	ERFA	Seattle Seahawks; Kansas City Chiefs	Kansas City Chiefs
OLB	Andy Mulumba	UFA	Green Bay Packers	Kansas City Chiefs
DE	Jonathan Massaquoi	UFA	Atlanta Falcons	Kansas City Chiefs
LB	Dezman Moses	RFA	Kansas City Chiefs	Kansas City Chiefs
C	Drew Nowak	UFA	Seattle Seahawks	Kansas City Chiefs
DE	Efe Obada	UFA	Dallas Cowboys	Kansas City Chiefs
T	Mitchell Schwartz	UFA	Cleveland Browns	Kansas City Chiefs
FS	Daniel Sorensen	ERFA	Kansas City Chiefs	Kansas City Chiefs
CB	Sean Smith	UFA	Kansas City Chiefs	Oakland Raiders
T	Donald Stephenson	UFA	Kansas City Chiefs	Denver Broncos
WR	Rod Streater	UFA	Oakland Raiders	Kansas City Chiefs
RB	Charcandrick West	ERFA	Kansas City Chiefs	Kansas City Chiefs
WR	Mike Williams	UFA	None	Kansas City Chiefs
DE	Nick Williams	ERFA	Kansas City Chiefs	Kansas City Chiefs
SS	Jimmy Wilson	UFA	San Diego Chargers	Kansas City Chiefs
LB	Frank Zombo	UFA	Kansas City Chiefs	Kansas City Chiefs
*RFA: Restricted free agent, UFA: Unrestricted free agent, ERFA: Exclusive rights free agent, Franchise: Franchise tag

=== Draft ===
2016 Kansas City Chiefs Draft
Round	Selection	Player	Position	College
2	37	Chris Jones	Defensive tackle	Mississippi State
3	74	KeiVarae Russell	Cornerback	Notre Dame
4	105	Parker Ehinger	Guard	Cincinnati
4	106	Eric Murray	Cornerback	Minnesota
4	126	Demarcus Robinson	Wide receiver	Florida
5	162	Kevin Hogan	Quarterback	Stanford
5	165	Tyreek Hill	Wide receiver	West Alabama
6	178	D. J. White	Cornerback	Georgia Tech
6	203	Dadi Nicolas	Linebacker	Virginia Tech

Notes

- The Chiefs forfeited their original third-round selection (what would have been the 91st overall selection) as part of the punishment for violating the NFL's anti-tampering policy.
- The Chiefs acquired an additional fifth-round selection in a trade that sent safety Kelcie McCray to the Seattle Seahawks.
- The Chiefs traded their 1st round draft pick (28th overall) and 7th round pick (249th overall) to the San Francisco 49ers in exchange for the 49ers 2nd round pick (37th overall), 4th round pick (105th overall), and 6th round pick (178th overall)
- The Chiefs traded their 2nd round draft pick (59th overall) to the Tampa Bay Buccaneers in exchange the Buccaneers 3rd round pick (74th overall) and 4th round selection (106th overall)

=== Undrafted free agents ===
Position	Player	College
WR	Mitch Mathews	BYU
OL	Jake Bernstein	Vanderbilt
C	Ben Clarke	Hawaii
CB	Vernon Harris	Dartmouth
CB	Shak Randolph	SMU
LB	Terrance Smith	Florida State
SS	Peni Vea	UNLV
FS	Bryce Cheek	Akron

Players signed from rookie mini camp tryouts

Position	Player	College
CB	Shannon Edwards	Fresno State
G	Garrick Mayweather	Fordham
T	Zach Sterup	Nebraska

Cuts

Position	Player
WR	Kenny Cook
G	Paul Fanaika
G	Ben Grubbs

Players cut in the offseason before playing for the Chiefs

Position	Player
G	Jake Bernstein
C	Ben Clarke
LB	Cameron Gordon
S	Jimmy Wilson
WR	Fred Williams
LB	Tautvydas Kieras
G	Michael Liedtke
T	Laurence Gibson
S	Jordan Kovacs
S	Keith Lewis
LB	Efe Obada
SS	Peni Vea

=== Camp transactions ===
Cuts

Position	Player
Alameda Ta'amu	DT
Tre Jones	CB
Shannon Edwards	CB
Vernon Harris	CB

Signings

Position	Player
Bryce Cheek	S
Nick Foles	QB
Jeron Johnson	S
Malcolm Jackson	CB

=== Preseason transactions ===
Cuts

Position	Player
S	Akeem Davis

Signings

Position	Player
S	Brock Vereen

Trades

Position	Player/pick received	Team	Compensation
CB	CB Kenneth Acker	San Francisco 49ers	7th round pick 2018 NFL draft
N/A	Undisclosed draft pick 2018 NFL draft	Arizona Cardinals	CB Marcus Cooper
N/A	Undisclosed draft pick	San Francisco 49ers	WR Rod Streater

Roster cut downs

Cuts to 75
Position	Player
S	Bryce Cheek
DE	Niko Davis
T	Curtis Feigt
CB	Malcolm Jackson
WR	Seantavius Jones
WR	Mitch Mathews
LB	Jonathan Massaquoi
WR	Kashif Moore
C	Drew Nowak

Cuts to 53
Position	Player
LB	Tyrell Adams
WR	Da'Ron Brown
CB	Deveron Carr
T	Reid Fragel
S	Jamell Fleming
WR	Frankie Hammond
QB	Kevin Hogan
S	Jeron Johnson
DE	David King
LB	Andy Mulumba
C	Daniel Munyer
QB	Aaron Murray
TE	Brian Parker
G	Jarrod Pughsley
S	Shak Randolph
RB	Darrin Reaves
LB	Terrance Smith
DE	Jimmy Staten
T	Zach Sterup
CB	Brock Vereen

=== Regular season transactions ===
Trades

Position	Player/Pick Received	Team	Compensation
N/A	None*	Green Bay Packers	RB Knile Davis

*Trade included a conditional draft pick that required Davis to stay on the roster for a specific amount of time; since he did not meet this requirement, the Chiefs received no compensation.

Cuts

Position	Player
CB	KeiVarae Russell
DE	Nick Williams

Signings

Position	Player	Previous team
T	Bryan Witzmann	Dallas Cowboys
DE	Kendall Reyes	Washington Redskins
LB	Terrance Smith	Kansas City Chiefs*
G	Mike Person	Atlanta Falcons
DL	Jarvis Jenkins	New York Jets
RB	Knile Davis	Green Bay Packers†
CB	Terrance Mitchell	Kansas City Chiefs*

*Indicates player was signed off practice squad of team listed
†Knile Davis was traded to the Packers, then was released 2 weeks later, and signed back to the Chiefs

Players involved in multiple transactions

This list is for players who were involved in more than one transaction during the season

Position	Player	Final status
LB	Dezman Moses	Free agent
T	Jordan Devey	Chiefs active roster
LB	Ramik Wilson	Chiefs active roster
DT	Rakeem Nuñez-Roches	Chiefs active roster
LB	Sam Barrington	Saints active roster
LB	Sio Moore	Cardinals active roster
CB	Terrance Mitchell	Chiefs active roster
DT	David King	Chiefs active roster
RB	Bishop Sankey	Vikings practice squad

== Staff ==
2016 Kansas City Chiefs staff
Front office: Chairman/CEO – Clark Hunt; President – Mark Donovan; General manager – John Dorsey; Director of football administration – Trip MacCracken; Director of football operations – Chris Ballard; Co-director of player personnel – Mike Borgonzi; Co-director of player personnel – Brett Veach; Director of college scouting – Marvin Allen; Director of pro scouting – Will Lewis; Head coaches: Head coach – Andy Reid; Assistant head coach/wide receivers – David Culley; Senior assistant to the head coach – Kyle Childress; Offensive coaches: Co-offensive coordinator – Brad Childress; Co-offensive coordinator – Matt Nagy; Assistant quarterbacks – Corey Matthaei; Running backs – Eric Bieniemy; Tight ends – Tom Melvin; Offensive line – Andy Heck; Offensive quality control – Joe Bleymaier; Statistical analysis coordinator – Mike Frazier	Defensive coaches: Defensive coordinator – Bob Sutton; Defensive line – Britt Reid; Assistant defensive line – Mike Smith; Linebackers – Gary Gibbs; Assistant linebackers – Mark DeLeone; Defensive backs – Emmitt Thomas; Secondary/cornerbacks – Al Harris; Defensive assistant – Taylor Embree; Special projects – Tommy Brasher; Special teams coaches: Special teams coordinator – Dave Toub; Assistant special teams – Brock Olivo; Strength and conditioning: Head athletic trainer – Rick Burkholder; Strength and conditioning – Barry Rubin; Assistant strength and conditioning – Travis Crittenden; Assistant strength and conditioning – Devin Woodhouse; Assistant strength and conditioning – Ryan Reynolds

== Final roster ==
2016 Kansas City Chiefs roster
Quarterbacks (QB): 9 Tyler Bray; 4 Nick Foles; 11 Alex Smith; Running backs (RB): 34 Knile Davis; 42 Anthony Sherman FB; 32 Spencer Ware; 35 Charcandrick West; Wide receivers (WR): 17 Chris Conley; 10 Tyreek Hill; 19 Jeremy Maclin; 14 Demarcus Robinson; 13 De'Anthony Thomas; 12 Albert Wilson; Tight ends (TE): 84 Demetrius Harris; 87 Travis Kelce; 80 James O'Shaughnessy; 88 Ross Travis	Offensive linemen (OL): 76 Laurent Duvernay-Tardif G; 72 Eric Fisher T; 73 Zach Fulton G; 61 Mitch Morse C; 68 Mike Person G; 75 Jah Reid G/T; 71 Mitchell Schwartz T; 70 Bryan Witzmann T; Defensive linemen (DL): 77 T. J. Barnes NT; 94 Jarvis Jenkins DE; 95 Chris Jones DE; 99 Rakeem Nuñez-Roches DE; 92 Dontari Poe NT; 98 Kendall Reyes DE	Linebackers (LB): 57 D. J. Alexander ILB; 55 Dee Ford OLB; 91 Tamba Hali OLB; 50 Justin Houston OLB; 59 Justin March-Lilliard ILB; 52 Dadi Nicolas OLB; 48 Terrance Smith ILB; 53 Ramik Wilson ILB; 51 Frank Zombo OLB; Defensive backs (DB): 27 Kenneth Acker CB; 29 Eric Berry SS; 23 Phillip Gaines CB; 39 Terrance Mitchell CB; 21 Eric Murray SS; 20 Steven Nelson CB; 38 Ron Parker FS; 22 Marcus Peters CB; 49 Daniel Sorensen FS; 24 D. J. White CB; Special teams (ST): 2 Dustin Colquitt P; 5 Cairo Santos K; 41 James Winchester LS	Practice squad: 67 Joseph Cheek T; 65 Jordan Devey G; 43 Jimmy Hall SS; 85 Frankie Hammond WR; 60 Cory Johnson NT; 81 Seantavius Jones WR; 44 Earl Okine DE; 31 Darrin Reaves RB; 45 Darnell Sankey ILB; 8 Joel Stave QB; Reserve: 97 Allen Bailey DE (IR); 25 Jamaal Charles RB (IR); 6 Kenny Cook WR (IR); 79 Parker Ehinger G (IR); -- Vernon Harris CB (IR); 96 Jaye Howard DE (IR); 56 Derrick Johnson ILB (IR); 90 Josh Mauga ILB (IR); 40 Trey Millard FB (IR); Rookies in italics 53 active, 9 reserve, 10 practice squad

== Preseason ==
=== Schedule ===
Week	Date	Opponent	Result	Record	Venue	Recap
1	August 13	Seattle Seahawks	L 16–17	0–1	Arrowhead Stadium	Recap
2	August 20	at Los Angeles Rams	L 20–21	0–2	Los Angeles Memorial Coliseum	Recap
3	August 27	at Chicago Bears	W 23–7	1–2	Soldier Field	Recap
4	September 1	Green Bay Packers	W 17–7	2–2	Arrowhead Stadium	Recap

=== Game summaries ===
==== Week 1: vs. Seattle Seahawks ====
Week 1: Seattle Seahawks at Kansas City Chiefs – Game summary

Quarter	1	2	3	4	Total
Seahawks	0	3	3	11	17
Chiefs	7	6	3	0	16

at Arrowhead Stadium, Kansas City, Missouri

- Date: August 13
- Game time: 3:30 p.m. CDT
- Game weather: Sunny, 87 °F (31 °C)
- Game attendance: 69,816
- Referee: Walt Anderson
- Recap, Game Book

Game information

First quarter

- KC – Spencer Ware 1-yard run (Cairo Santos kick), 10:40. Chiefs 7–0. Drive: 8 plays, 49 yards, 4:20.

Second quarter

- SEA – Stephen Hauschka 52-yard field goal, 14:50. Chiefs 7–3. Drive: 10 plays, 20 yards, 4:22.
- KC – Cairo Santos 28-yard field goal, 10:33. Chiefs 10–3. Drive: 9 plays, 64 yards, 4:17.
- KC – Cairo Santos 49-yard field goal, 5:55. Chiefs 13–3. Drive: 7 plays, 25 yards, 2:10.

Third quarter

- SEA – Stephen Hauschka 49-yard field goal, 11:28. Chiefs 13–6. Drive: 9 plays, 34 yards, 3:22.
- KC – Cairo Santos 58-yard field goal, 6:01. Chiefs 16–6. Drive: 9 plays, 49 yards, 5:27.

Fourth quarter

- SEA – Stephen Hauschka 50-yard field goal, 3:15. Chiefs 16–9. Drive: 7 plays, 39 yards, 2:21.
- SEA – Tanner McEvoy 37-yard pass from Trevone Boykin (Troymaine Pope run), 0:00. Seahawks 17–16. Drive: 4 plays, 88 yards, 1:07.

Top passers

- SEA – Trevone Boykin – 16/26, 188 yards, TD
- KC – Aaron Murray – 3/5, 52 yards

Top rushers

- SEA – Christine Michael – 7 rushes, 44 yards
- KC – Darrin Reaves – 11 rushes, 42 yards

Top receivers

- SEA – Tanner McEvoy – 3 receptions, 77 yards, TD
- KC – De'Anthony Thomas – 3 receptions, 46 yards

==== Week 2: at Los Angeles Rams ====
Week 2: Kansas City Chiefs at Los Angeles Rams – Game summary

Quarter	1	2	3	4	Total
Chiefs	7	13	0	0	20
Rams	7	7	0	7	21

at Los Angeles Memorial Coliseum, Los Angeles, California

- Date: August 20
- Game time: 8:00 p.m. CDT/6:00 p.m. PDT
- Game weather: Sunny, 71 °F (22 °C)
- Game attendance: 80,782
- Referee: Tony Corrente
- Recap, Game Book

Game information

First quarter

- KC – Spencer Ware 2-yard run (Cairo Santos kick), 7:44. Chiefs 7–0. Drive: 13 plays, 75 yards, 7:16.
- LA – Todd Gurley 3-yard run (Greg Zuerlein kick), 5:13. Tied 7–7. Drive: 5 plays, 81 yards, 2:31.

Second quarter

- LA – Pharoh Cooper 11-yard pass from Case Keenum (Greg Zuerlein kick), 13:37. Rams 14–7. Drive: 10 plays, 79 yards, 4:44.
- KC – Jeremy Maclin 20-yard pass from Alex Smith (Cairo Santos kick), 10:08. Tied 14–14. Drive: 6 plays, 75 yards, 3:29.
- KC – Cairo Santos 32-yard field goal, 7:55. Chiefs 17–14. Drive: 4 plays, 2 yards, 1:53.
- KC – Cairo Santos 19-yard field goal, 0:03. Chiefs 20–14. Drive: 16 plays, 85 yards, 3:20.

Third quarter

- No scoring plays.

Fourth quarter

- LA – Malcolm Brown 10-yard pass from Jared Goff (Taylor Bertolet kick), 10:30. Rams 21–20. Drive: 5 plays, 67 yards, 2:53.

Top passers

- KC – Alex Smith – 9/12, 137 yards, TD
- LA – Jared Goff – 8/12, 82 yards, TD

Top rushers

- KC – Spencer Ware – 10 rushes, 37 yards, TD
- LA – Malcolm Brown – 12 rushes, 68 yards

Top receivers

- KC – Chris Conley – 3 receptions, 66 yards
- LA – Kenny Britt – 2 receptions, 27 yards

==== Week 3: at Chicago Bears ====
Week 3: Kansas City Chiefs at Chicago Bears – Game summary

Quarter	1	2	3	4	Total
Chiefs	0	13	7	3	23
Bears	0	0	0	7	7

at Soldier Field, Chicago, Illinois

- Date: August 27
- Game time: 12:00 p.m. CDT
- Game weather: Cloudy, 76 °F (24 °C)
- Game attendance: 61,681
- Referee: Gene Steratore
- Recap, Game Book

Game information

First quarter

- No scoring plays.

Second quarter

- KC – Cairo Santos 20-yard field goal, 13:30. Chiefs 3–0. Drive: 13 plays, 62 yards, 7:15.
- KC – Cairo Santos 28-yard field goal, 4:50. Chiefs 6–0. Drive: 10 plays, 55 yards, 4:15.
- KC – Spencer Ware 1-yard run (Cairo Santos kick), 0:10. Chiefs 13–0. Drive: 11 plays, 70 yards, 3:39.

Third quarter

- KC – Darrin Reaves 4-yard run (Cairo Santos kick), 6:41. Chiefs 20–0. Drive: 8 plays, 62 yards, 3:52.

Fourth quarter

- KC – Cairo Santos 41-yard field goal, 9:04. Chiefs 23–0. Drive: 9 plays, 33 yards, 4:22.
- CHI – Cameron Meredith 16-yard pass from Connor Shaw (Robbie Gould kick), 5:40. Chiefs 23–7. Drive: 9 plays, 79 yards, 3:24.

Top passers

- KC – Alex Smith – 20/30, 181 yards
- CHI – Brian Hoyer – 8/17, 71 yards

Top rushers

- KC – Alex Smith – 2 rushes, 25 yards
- CHI – Jeremy Langford – 6 rushes, 17 yards

Top receivers

- KC – Tyreek Hill – 1 reception, 58 yards
- CHI – Cameron Meredith – 4 receptions, 64 yards, TD

==== Week 4: vs. Green Bay Packers ====
Week 4: Green Bay Packers at Kansas City Chiefs – Game summary

Quarter	1	2	3	4	Total
Packers	7	0	0	0	7
Chiefs	0	17	0	0	17

at Arrowhead Stadium, Kansas City, Missouri

- Date: September 1
- Game time: 7:00 p.m. CDT
- Game weather: Sunny, 77 °F (25 °C)
- Game attendance: 70,155
- Referee: Jerome Boger
- Recap, Game Book

Game information

First quarter

- GB – Jared Cook 5-yard pass from Joe Callahan (Mason Crosby kick), 1:57. Packers 7–0. Drive: 2 plays, 14 yards, 0:50.

Second quarter

- KC – Knile Davis 5-yard run (Cairo Santos kick), 14:00. Tied 7–7. Drive: 9 plays, 75 yards, 2:57.
- KC – Darrin Reaves 3-yard run (Cairo Santos kick), 4:15. Chiefs 14–7. Drive: 10 plays, 58 yards, 5:54.
- KC – Cairo Santos 42-yard field goal, 0:00. Chiefs 17–7. Drive: 8 plays, 33 yards, 1:40.

Third quarter

- No scoring plays.

Fourth quarter

- No scoring plays.

Top passers

- GB – Joe Callahan – 13/24, 143 yards, TD
- KC – Aaron Murray – 10/18, 108 yards, 2 INT

Top rushers

- GB – Brandon Burks – 12 rushes, 31 yards
- KC – Darrin Reaves – 17 rushes, 63 yards, TD

Top receivers

- GB – Jared Abbrederis – 2 receptions, 49 yards
- KC – Rod Streater – 3 receptions, 52 yards

== Regular season ==
=== Schedule ===
Week	Date	Opponent	Result	Record	Venue	Recap
1	September 11	**San Diego Chargers**	**W** 33–27 (OT)	1–0	Arrowhead Stadium	Recap
2	September 18	at Houston Texans	**L** 12–19	1–1	NRG Stadium	Recap
3	September 25	New York Jets	**W** 24–3	2–1	Arrowhead Stadium	Recap
4	October 2	at Pittsburgh Steelers	**L** 14–43	2–2	Heinz Field	Recap
5	Bye					
6	October 16	at **Oakland Raiders**	**W** 26–10	3–2	Oakland Alameda Coliseum	Recap
7	October 23	New Orleans Saints	**W** 27–21	4–2	Arrowhead Stadium	Recap
8	October 30	at Indianapolis Colts	**W** 30–14	5–2	Lucas Oil Stadium	Recap
9	November 6	Jacksonville Jaguars	**W** 19–14	6–2	Arrowhead Stadium	Recap
10	November 13	at Carolina Panthers	**W** 20–17	7–2	Bank of America Stadium	Recap
11	November 20	Tampa Bay Buccaneers	**L** 17–19	7–3	Arrowhead Stadium	Recap
12	November 27	at **Denver Broncos**	**W** 30–27 (OT)	8–3	Sports Authority Field at Mile High	Recap
13	December 4	at Atlanta Falcons	**W** 29–28	9–3	Georgia Dome	Recap
14	December 8	**Oakland Raiders**	**W** 21–13	10–3	Arrowhead Stadium	Recap
15	December 18	Tennessee Titans	**L** 17–19	10–4	Arrowhead Stadium	Recap
16	December 25	**Denver Broncos**	**W** 33–10	11–4	Arrowhead Stadium	Recap
17	January 1	at **San Diego Chargers**	**W** 37–27	12–4	Qualcomm Stadium	Recap

Note: Intra-division opponents are in bold text.

=== Game summaries ===
==== Week 1: vs. San Diego Chargers ====
Week 1: San Diego Chargers at Kansas City Chiefs – Game summary

Quarter	1	2	3	4	OT	Total
Chargers	7	14	3	3	0	**27**
**Chiefs**	3	0	7	17	6	**33**

at Arrowhead Stadium, Kansas City, Missouri

- Date: September 11
- Game time: 12:00 p.m. CDT
- Game weather: Sunny, 74 °F (23 °C)
- Game attendance: 73,238
- Referee: Jerome Boger
- TV announcers (CBS): Kevin Harlan and Rich Gannon
- Recap, Game Book

Game information

**First quarter**

- KC – Cairo Santos 47-yard field goal, 11:51. Chiefs 3–0. **Drive: 7 plays, 46 yards, 3:09.**
- SD – Melvin Gordon 1-yard run (Josh Lambo kick), 8:27. Chargers 7–3. **Drive: 6 plays, 75 yards, 3:24.**

**Second quarter**

- SD – Melvin Gordon 6-yard run (Josh Lambo kick), 11:51. Chargers 14–3. **Drive: 13 plays, 80 yards, 6:51.**
- SD – Danny Woodhead 4-yard pass from Philip Rivers (Josh Lambo kick), 7:54. Chargers 21–3. **Drive: 6 plays, 38 yards, 3:32.**

**Third quarter**

- SD – Josh Lambo 29-yard field goal, 6:02. Chargers 24–3. **Drive: 9 plays, 34 yards, 4:00.**
- KC – Tyreek Hill 9-yard pass from Alex Smith (Cairo Santos kick), 2:47. Chargers 24–10. **Drive: 7 plays, 75 yards, 3:15.**

**Fourth quarter**

- SD – Josh Lambo 28-yard field goal, 13:24. Chargers 27–10. **Drive: 9 plays, 65 yards, 4:23.**
- KC – Jeremy Maclin 19-yard pass from Alex Smith (Cairo Santos kick), 9:18. Chargers 27–17. **Drive: 7 plays, 56 yards, 2:02.**
- KC – Cairo Santos 33-yard field goal, 3:09. Chargers 27–20. **Drive: 12 plays, 62 yards, 3:40.**
- KC – Spencer Ware 5-yard run (Cairo Santos kick), 1:03. Tied 27–27. **Drive: 4 plays, 42 yards, 0:46.**

**Overtime**

- KC – Alex Smith 2-yard run, 9:53. Chiefs 33–27. **Drive: 10 plays, 70 yards, 5:07.**

**Top passers**

- SD – Philip Rivers – 25/36, 243 yards, TD
- KC – Alex Smith – 34/48, 363 yards, 2 TD, INT

**Top rushers**

- SD – Danny Woodhead – 16 rushes, 89 yards
- KC – Spencer Ware – 11 rushes, 70 yards, TD

**Top receivers**

- SD – Tyrell Williams – 2 receptions, 71 yards
- KC – Spencer Ware – 7 receptions, 129 yards

==== Week 2: at Houston Texans ====
Week 2: Kansas City Chiefs at Houston Texans – Game summary

Quarter	1	2	3	4	Total
Chiefs	0	3	0	9	**12**
**Texans**	7	6	0	6	**19**

at NRG Stadium, Houston, Texas

- Date: September 18
- Game time: 12:00 p.m. CDT
- Game weather: None (retractable roof closed)
- Game attendance: 71,890
- Referee: Tony Corrente
- TV announcers (CBS): Spero Dedes and Solomon Wilcots
- Recap, Game Book

Game information

**First quarter**

- HOU – DeAndre Hopkins 27-yard pass from Brock Osweiler (Nick Novak kick), 8:01. Texans 7–0. **Drive: 1 play, 27 yards, 0:07.**

**Second quarter**

- KC – Cairo Santos 54-yard field goal, 14:55. Texans 7–3. **Drive: 4 plays, 2 yards, 1:17.**
- HOU – Nick Novak 32-yard field goal, 4:16. Texans 10–3. **Drive: 14 plays, 69 yards, 6:43.**
- HOU – Nick Novak 24-yard field goal, 1:21. Texans 13–3. **Drive: 4 plays, 8 yards, 0:19.**

**Third quarter**

- No scoring plays.

**Fourth quarter**

- KC – Cairo Santos 43-yard field goal, 14:56. Texans 13–6. **Drive: 5 plays, 26 yards, 2:50.**
- HOU – Nick Novak 31-yard field goal, 9:34. Texans 16–6. **Drive: 11 plays, 47 yards, 5:22.**
- KC – Cairo Santos 35-yard field goal, 7:34. Texans 16–9. **Drive: 8 plays, 52 yards, 2:00.**
- HOU – Nick Novak 43-yard field goal, 2:56. Texans 19–9. **Drive: 11 plays, 49 yards, 4:38.**
- KC – Cairo Santos 30-yard field goal, 0:49. Texans 19–12. **Drive: 10 plays, 76 yards, 2:07.**

**Top passers**

- KC – Alex Smith – 20/37, 186 yards
- HOU – Brock Osweiler – 19/33, 268 yards, TD, 2 INT

**Top rushers**

- KC – Charcandrick West – 6 rushes, 61 yards
- HOU – Lamar Miller – 25 rushes, 83 yards

**Top receivers**

- KC – Jeremy Maclin – 6 receptions, 68 yards
- HOU – DeAndre Hopkins – 7 receptions, 113 yards, TD

==== Week 3: vs. New York Jets ====
Week 3: New York Jets at Kansas City Chiefs – Game summary

Quarter	1	2	3	4	Total
Jets	0	3	0	0	**3**
**Chiefs**	7	10	0	7	**24**

at Arrowhead Stadium, Kansas City, Missouri

- Date: September 25
- Game time: 3:25 p.m. CDT
- Game weather: Cloudy, 65 °F (18 °C)
- Game attendance: 71,587
- Referee: Bill Vinovich
- TV announcers (CBS): Greg Gumbel, Trent Green and Jamie Erdahl
- Recap, Game Book

Game information

**First quarter**

- KC – Travis Kelce 12-yard pass from Alex Smith (Cairo Santos kick), 0:13. Chiefs 7–0. **Drive: 4 plays, 35 yards, 2:11.**

**Second quarter**

- KC – Cairo Santos 27-yard field goal, 6:11. Chiefs 10–0. **Drive: 14 plays, 44 yards, 6:59.**
- KC – Demetrius Harris 27-yard fumble return (Cairo Santos kick), 6:02. Chiefs 17–0.
- NYJ – Nick Folk 28-yard field goal, 2:06. Chiefs 17–3. **Drive: 9 plays, 46 yards, 3:56.**

**Third quarter**

- No scoring plays.

**Fourth quarter**

- KC – Derrick Johnson 55-yard interception return (Cairo Santos kick), 3:28. Chiefs 24–3.

**Top passers**

- NYJ – Ryan Fitzpatrick – 20/44, 188 yards, 6 INT
- KC – Alex Smith – 25/33, 237 yards, TD

**Top rushers**

- NYJ – Matt Forte – 15 rushes, 65 yards
- KC – Spencer Ware – 20 rushes, 75 yards

**Top receivers**

- NYJ – Bilal Powell – 6 receptions, 41 yards
- KC – Travis Kelce – 6 receptions, 89 yards, TD

The Chiefs picked off the Jets six times.

==== Week 4: at Pittsburgh Steelers ====
Week 4: Kansas City Chiefs at Pittsburgh Steelers – Game summary

Quarter	1	2	3	4	Total
Chiefs	0	0	0	14	**14**
**Steelers**	22	7	7	7	**43**

at Heinz Field, Pittsburgh, Pennsylvania

- Date: October 2
- Game time: 8:30 p.m. EDT/7:30 p.m. CDT
- Game weather: Rain, 59 °F (15 °C)
- Game attendance: 61,278
- Referee: Ronald Torbert
- TV announcers (NBC): Al Michaels, Cris Collinsworth and Michele Tafoya
- Recap, Game Book

Game information

**First quarter**

- PIT – Darrius Heyward-Bey 31-yard pass from Ben Roethlisberger (Ben Roethlisberger–Markus Wheaton pass), 7:27. Steelers 8–0. **Drive: 3 plays, 32 yards, 1:23.**
- PIT – Antonio Brown 4-yard pass from Ben Roethlisberger (Chris Boswell kick), 5:10. Steelers 15–0. **Drive: 1 play, 4 yards, 0:04.**
- PIT – Antonio Brown 38-yard pass from Ben Roethlisberger (Chris Boswell kick), 1:20. Steelers 22–0. **Drive: 2 plays, 40 yards, 0:47.**

**Second quarter**

- PIT – Jesse James 9-yard pass from Ben Roethlisberger (Chris Boswell kick), 0:44. Steelers 29–0. **Drive: 10 plays, 80 yards, 3:44.**

**Third quarter**

- PIT – Markus Wheaton 30-yard pass from Ben Roethlisberger (Chris Boswell kick), 11:19. Steelers 36–0. **Drive: 6 plays, 75 yards, 3:41.**

**Fourth quarter**

- KC – Tyreek Hill 9-yard pass from Alex Smith (Cairo Santos kick), 11:11. Steelers 36–7. **Drive: 7 plays, 47 yards, 2:17.**
- PIT – DeAngelo Williams 2-yard run (Chris Boswell kick), 7:22. Steelers 43–7. **Drive: 8 plays, 75 yards, 3:49.**
- KC – Travis Kelce 3-yard pass from Alex Smith (Cairo Santos kick), 0:04. Steelers 43–14. **Drive: 7 plays, 62 yards, 3:41.**

**Top passers**

- KC – Alex Smith – 30/50, 287 yards, 2 TD, INT
- PIT – Ben Roethlisberger – 22/27, 300 yards, 5 TD

**Top rushers**

- KC – Spencer Ware – 13 rushes, 82 yards
- PIT – Le'Veon Bell – 18 rushes, 144 yards

**Top receivers**

- KC – Jeremy Maclin – 5 receptions, 78 yards
- PIT – Sammie Coates – 6 receptions, 79 yards

==== Week 6: at Oakland Raiders ====
Week 6: Kansas City Chiefs at Oakland Raiders – Game summary

Quarter	1	2	3	4	Total
**Chiefs**	7	6	10	3	**26**
Raiders	7	3	0	0	**10**

at Oakland Alameda Coliseum, Oakland, California

- Date: October 16
- Game time: 3:05 p.m. CDT/1:05 p.m. PDT
- Game weather: Rain, 61 °F (16 °C)
- Game attendance: 54,211
- Referee: Pete Morelli
- TV announcers (CBS): Kevin Harlan and Rich Gannon
- Recap, Game Book

Game information

**First quarter**

- OAK – Andre Holmes 3-yard pass from Derek Carr (Sebastian Janikowski kick), 11:58. Raiders 7–0. **Drive: 7 plays, 46 yards, 3:02.**
- KC – Spencer Ware 2-yard run (Cairo Santos kick), 2:16. Tied 7–7. **Drive: 10 plays, 57 yards, 5:27.**

**Second quarter**

- KC – Jamaal Charles 4-yard run (kick failed, wide right), 7:11. Chiefs 13–7. **Drive: 6 plays, 58 yards, 3:18.**
- OAK – Sebastian Janikowski 46-yard field goal, 0:00. Chiefs 13–10. **Drive: 5 plays, 44 yards, 0:25.**

**Third quarter**

- KC – Dontari Poe 1-yard run (Cairo Santos kick), 11:37. Chiefs 20–10. **Drive: 7 plays, 75 yards, 3:23.**
- KC – Cairo Santos 22-yard field goal, 7:48. Chiefs 23–10. **Drive: 5 plays, 32 yards, 2:47.**

**Fourth quarter**

- KC – Cairo Santos 44-yard field goal, 9:51. Chiefs 26–10. **Drive: 11 plays, 52 yards, 5:32.**

**Top passers**

- KC – Alex Smith – 19/22, 224 yards
- OAK – Derek Carr – 22/34, 225 yards, TD, INT

**Top rushers**

- KC – Spencer Ware – 24 rushes, 131 yards, TD
- OAK – DeAndré Washington – 10 rushes, 49 yards

**Top receivers**

- KC – Jeremy Maclin – 3 receptions, 49 yards
- OAK – Amari Cooper – 10 receptions, 129 yards

==== Week 7: vs. New Orleans Saints ====
Week 7: New Orleans Saints at Kansas City Chiefs – Game summary

Quarter	1	2	3	4	Total
Saints	7	0	7	7	**21**
**Chiefs**	14	7	3	3	**27**

at Arrowhead Stadium, Kansas City, Missouri

- Date: October 23
- Game time: 12:00 p.m. CDT
- Game weather: Sunny, 68 °F (20 °C)
- Game attendance: 76,282
- Referee: Clete Blakeman
- TV announcers (Fox): Kenny Albert, John Lynch and Pam Oliver
- Recap, Game Book

Game information

**First quarter**

- NO – Brandin Cooks 9-yard pass from Drew Brees (Wil Lutz kick), 6:07. Saints 7–0. **Drive: 10 plays, 80 yards, 4:40.**
- KC – Spencer Ware 46-yard pass from Alex Smith (Cairo Santos kick), 4:07. Tied 7–7. **Drive: 5 plays, 75 yards, 2:00.**
- KC – Daniel Sorensen 48-yard interception return (Cairo Santos kick), 0:46. Chiefs 14–7.

**Second quarter**

- KC – Tyreek Hill 38-yard pass from Alex Smith (Cairo Santos kick), 7:02. Chiefs 21–7. **Drive: 8 plays, 85 yards, 4:58.**

**Third quarter**

- NO – Mark Ingram II 3-yard pass from Drew Brees (Wil Lutz kick), 6:57. Chiefs 21–14. **Drive: 14 plays, 75 yards, 8:03.**
- KC – Cairo Santos 39-yard field goal, 3:21. Chiefs 24–14. **Drive: 7 plays, 42 yards, 3:36.**

**Fourth quarter**

- NO – Brandon Coleman 10-yard pass from Drew Brees (Wil Lutz kick), 2:33. Chiefs 24–21. **Drive: 10 plays, 80 yards, 2:27.**
- KC – Cairo Santos 41-yard field goal, 0:28. Chiefs 27–21. **Drive: 6 plays, 23 yards, 2:05.**

**Top passers**

- NO – Drew Brees – 37/48, 367 yards, 3 TD, INT
- KC – Alex Smith – 17/24, 214 yards, 2 TD

**Top rushers**

- NO – Mark Ingram II – 16 rushes, 62 yards
- KC – Spencer Ware – 17 rushes, 77 yards

**Top receivers**

- NO – Michael Thomas – 10 receptions, 130 yards
- KC – Spencer Ware – 2 receptions, 54 yards, TD

==== Week 8: at Indianapolis Colts ====
Week 8: Kansas City Chiefs at Indianapolis Colts – Game summary

Quarter	1	2	3	4	Total
**Chiefs**	3	14	7	6	**30**
Colts	0	7	7	0	**14**

at Lucas Oil Stadium, Indianapolis, Indiana

- Date: October 30
- Game time: 1:00 p.m. EDT/12:00 p.m. CDT
- Game weather: None (retractable roof closed)
- Game attendance: 65,417
- Referee: Craig Wrolstad
- TV announcers (CBS): Spero Dedes and Solomon Wilcots
- Recap, Game Book

Game information

**First quarter**

- KC – Cairo Santos 33-yard field goal, 10:20. Chiefs 3–0. **Drive: 12 plays, 60 yards, 4:40.**

**Second quarter**

- KC – Travis Kelce 14-yard pass from Nick Foles (Cairo Santos kick), 12:58. Chiefs 10–0. **Drive: 6 plays, 80 yards, 3:28.**
- IND – Frank Gore 18-yard pass from Andrew Luck (Adam Vinatieri kick), 10:07. Chiefs 10–7. **Drive: 6 plays, 63 yards, 2:51.**
- KC – Jeremy Maclin 13-yard pass from Alex Smith (Cairo Santos kick), 0:19. Chiefs 17–7. **Drive: 3 plays, 36 yards, 0:19.**

**Third quarter**

- KC – Tyreek Hill 34-yard pass from Nick Foles (Cairo Santos kick), 7:34. Chiefs 24–7. **Drive: 10 plays, 75 yards, 5:27.**
- IND – Donte Moncrief 3-yard pass from Andrew Luck (Adam Vinatieri kick), 2:05. Chiefs 24–14. **Drive: 10 plays, 75 yards, 5:29.**

**Fourth quarter**

- KC – Cairo Santos 22-yard field goal, 8:00. Chiefs 27–14. **Drive: 10 plays, 46 yards, 5:05.**
- KC – Cairo Santos 44-yard field goal, 3:35. Chiefs 30–14. **Drive: 8 plays, 44 yards, 3:34.**

**Top passers**

- KC – Nick Foles – 16/22, 223 yards, 2 TD
- IND – Andrew Luck – 19/35, 210 yards, 2 TD, INT

**Top rushers**

- KC – Charcandrick West – 14 rushes, 52 yards
- IND – Andrew Luck – 9 rushes, 60 yards

**Top receivers**

- KC – Travis Kelce – 7 receptions, 101 yards, TD
- IND – Phillip Dorsett – 5 receptions, 33 yards

==== Week 9: vs. Jacksonville Jaguars ====
Week 9: Jacksonville Jaguars at Kansas City Chiefs – Game summary

Quarter	1	2	3	4	Total
Jaguars	0	7	0	7	**14**
**Chiefs**	7	3	6	3	**19**

at Arrowhead Stadium, Kansas City, Missouri

- Date: November 6
- Game time: 12:00 p.m. CST
- Game weather: Clear, 62 °F (17 °C)
- Game attendance: 73,294
- Referee: Gene Steratore
- TV announcers (CBS): Spero Dedes and Solomon Wilcots
- Recap, Game Book

Game information

**First quarter**

- KC – Albert Wilson 23-yard pass from Nick Foles (Cairo Santos kick), 1:49. Chiefs 7–0. **Drive: 2 plays, 23 yards, 0:14.**

**Second quarter**

- KC – Cairo Santos 26-yard field goal, 9:54. Chiefs 10–0. **Drive: 4 plays, 5 yards, 2:05.**
- JAX – Allen Robinson 1-yard pass from Blake Bortles (Jason Myers kick), 0:02. Chiefs 10–7. **Drive: 11 plays, 88 yards, 3:19.**

**Third quarter**

- KC – Cairo Santos 51-yard field goal, 8:43. Chiefs 13–7. **Drive: 4 plays, 5 yards, 1:32.**
- KC – Cairo Santos 24-yard field goal, 3:59. Chiefs 16–7. **Drive: 6 plays, 25 yards, 2:29.**

**Fourth quarter**

- KC – Cairo Santos 36-yard field goal, 10:20. Chiefs 19–7. **Drive: 9 plays, 38 yards, 5:09.**
- JAX – T. J. Yeldon 13-yard pass from Blake Bortles (Jason Myers kick), 4:10. Chiefs 19–14. **Drive: 9 plays, 61 yards, 2:24.**

**Top passers**

- JAX – Blake Bortles – 22/41, 252 yards, 2 TD, INT
- KC – Nick Foles – 20/33, 187 yards, TD

**Top rushers**

- JAX – Chris Ivory – 18 rushes, 107 yards
- KC – Charcandrick West – 13 rushes, 39 yards

**Top receivers**

- JAX – Marqise Lee – 4 receptions, 84 yards
- KC – Travis Kelce – 5 receptions, 58 yards

==== Week 10: at Carolina Panthers ====
Week 10: Kansas City Chiefs at Carolina Panthers – Game summary

Quarter	1	2	3	4	Total
**Chiefs**	0	3	0	17	**20**
Panthers	3	14	0	0	**17**

at Bank of America Stadium, Charlotte, North Carolina

- Date: November 13
- Game time: 1:00 p.m. EST/12:00 p.m. CST
- Game weather: Cloudy, 45 °F (7 °C)
- Game attendance: 74,181
- Referee: Carl Cheffers
- TV announcers (CBS): Ian Eagle, Dan Fouts and Evan Washburn
- Recap, Game Book

Game information

**First quarter**

- CAR – Graham Gano 42-yard field goal, 10:49. Panthers 3–0. **Drive: 9 plays, 54 yards, 4:11.**

**Second quarter**

- CAR – Cam Newton 4-yard run (Graham Gano kick), 9:05. Panthers 10–0. **Drive: 11 plays, 80 yards, 5:44.**
- CAR – Devin Funchess 38-yard pass from Cam Newton (Graham Gano kick), 1:52. Panthers 17–0. **Drive: 7 plays, 87 yards, 3:36.**
- KC – Cairo Santos 47-yard field goal, 0:10. Panthers 17–3. **Drive: 12 plays, 46 yards, 1:42.**

**Third quarter**

- No scoring plays.

**Fourth quarter**

- KC – Cairo Santos 36-yard field goal, 12:02. Panthers 17–6. **Drive: 11 plays, 62 yards, 3:19.**
- KC – Eric Berry 42-yard interception return (Alex Smith–Travis Kelce pass), 10:32. Panthers 17–14.
- KC – Cairo Santos 33-yard field goal, 4:25. Tied 17–17. **Drive: 7 plays, 35 yards, 3:09.**
- KC – Cairo Santos 37-yard field goal, 0:00. Chiefs 20–17. **Drive: 3 plays, 11 yards, 0:20.**

**Top passers**

- KC – Alex Smith – 25/38, 178 yards, INT
- CAR – Cam Newton – 23/38, 261 yards, TD, INT

**Top rushers**

- KC – Spencer Ware – 13 rushes, 61 yards
- CAR – Cam Newton – 12 rushes, 54 yards

**Top receivers**

- KC – Tyreek Hill – 10 receptions, 89 yards
- CAR – Kelvin Benjamin – 7 receptions, 84 yards

==== Week 11: vs. Tampa Bay Buccaneers ====
Week 11: Tampa Bay Buccaneers at Kansas City Chiefs – Game summary

Quarter	1	2	3	4	Total
**Buccaneers**	0	9	3	7	**19**
Chiefs	3	7	0	7	**17**

at Arrowhead Stadium, Kansas City, Missouri

- Date: November 20
- Game time: 12:00 p.m. CST
- Game weather: Sunny, 46 °F (8 °C)
- Game attendance: 72,277
- Referee: Ed Hochuli
- TV announcers (Fox): Kenny Albert, Daryl Johnston and Laura Okmin
- Recap, Game Book

Game information

**First quarter**

- KC – Cairo Santos 22-yard field goal, 7:10. Chiefs 3–0. **Drive: 14 plays, 74 yards, 7:53.**

**Second quarter**

- TB – Roberto Aguayo 31-yard field goal, 9:49. Tied 3–3. **Drive: 9 plays, 62 yards, 4:28.**
- TB – Roberto Aguayo 22-yard field goal, 4:22. Buccaneers 6–3. **Drive: 10 plays, 63 yards, 4:20.**
- KC – Alex Smith 11-yard run (Cairo Santos kick), 1:20. Chiefs 10–6. **Drive: 6 plays, 80 yards, 3:06.**
- TB – Roberto Aguayo 41-yard field goal, 0:11. Chiefs 10–9. **Drive: 9 plays, 52 yards, 1:06.**

**Third quarter**

- TB – Roberto Aguayo 36-yard field goal, 10:06. Buccaneers 12–10. **Drive: 12 plays, 58 yards, 5:00.**

**Fourth quarter**

- TB – Alan Cross 3-yard pass from Jameis Winston (Roberto Aguayo kick), 6:30. Buccaneers 19–10. **Drive: 9 plays, 52 yards, 5:42.**
- KC – Albert Wilson 3-yard pass from Alex Smith (Cairo Santos kick), 2:29. Buccaneers 19–17. **Drive: 12 plays, 78 yards, 3:59.**

**Top passers**

- TB – Jameis Winston – 24/39, 331 yards, TD
- KC – Alex Smith – 24/31, 261 yards, TD, INT

**Top rushers**

- TB – Doug Martin – 24 rushes, 63 yards
- KC – Spencer Ware – 17 rushes, 69 yards

**Top receivers**

- TB – Mike Evans – 6 receptions, 105 yards
- KC – Travis Kelce – 7 receptions, 108 yards

==== Week 12: at Denver Broncos ====
Week 12: Kansas City Chiefs at Denver Broncos – Game summary

Quarter	1	2	3	4	OT	Total
**Chiefs**	0	9	7	8	6	**30**
Broncos	0	3	7	14	3	**27**

at Sports Authority Field at Mile High, Denver, Colorado

- Date: November 27
- Game time: 7:30 p.m. CST/6:30 p.m. MST
- Game weather: Mostly sunny, 44 °F (7 °C)
- Game attendance: 76,819
- Referee: Pete Morelli
- TV announcers (NBC): Mike Tirico, Cris Collinsworth and Michele Tafoya
- Recap, Game Book

Game information

**First quarter**

- No scoring plays.

**Second quarter**

- KC – Russell Okung tackled in end zone for a Safety, 6:16. Chiefs 2–0.
- KC – Tyreek Hill 86-yard kickoff return (Cairo Santos kick), 6:04. Chiefs 9–0.
- DEN – Brandon McManus 33-yard field goal, 1:47. Chiefs 9–3. **Drive: 10 plays, 60 yards, 4:17.**

**Third quarter**

- DEN – Jordan Taylor 6-yard pass from Trevor Siemian (Brandon McManus kick), 8:37. Broncos 10–9. **Drive: 12 plays, 63 yards, 5:20.**
- KC – Tyreek Hill 3-yard run (Cairo Santos kick), 0:30. Chiefs 16–10. **Drive: 12 plays, 75 yards, 7:07.**

**Fourth quarter**

- DEN – Emmanuel Sanders 35-yard pass from Trevor Siemian (Brandon McManus kick), 7:47. Broncos 17–16. **Drive: 4 plays, 88 yards, 1:37.**
- DEN – Bennie Fowler 76-yard pass from Trevor Siemian (Brandon McManus kick), 3:00. Broncos 24–16. **Drive: 6 plays, 96 yards, 2:37.**
- KC – Tyreek Hill 3-yard pass from Alex Smith (Alex Smith–Demetrius Harris pass), 0:12. Tied 24–24. **Drive: 13 plays, 75 yards, 2:48.**

**Overtime**

- DEN – Brandon McManus 44-yard field goal, 8:51. Broncos 27–24. **Drive: 11 plays, 49 yards, 6:09.**
- KC – Cairo Santos 37-yard field goal, 4:19. Tied 27–27. **Drive: 10 plays, 46 yards, 4:32.**
- KC – Cairo Santos 34-yard field goal, 0:02. Chiefs 30–27. **Drive: 4 plays, 32 yards, 1:01.**

**Top passers**

- KC – Alex Smith – 26/44, 220 yards, TD
- DEN – Trevor Siemian – 20/34, 368 yards, 3 TD

**Top rushers**

- KC – Spencer Ware – 17 rushes, 64 yards
- DEN – Devontae Booker – 24 rushes, 79 yards

**Top receivers**

- KC – Travis Kelce – 8 receptions, 101 yards
- DEN – Emmanuel Sanders – 7 receptions, 162 yards, TD

==== Week 13: at Atlanta Falcons ====
Week 13: Kansas City Chiefs at Atlanta Falcons – Game summary

Quarter	1	2	3	4	Total
**Chiefs**	6	14	7	2	**29**
Falcons	10	6	0	12	**28**

at Georgia Dome, Atlanta, Georgia

- Date: December 4
- Game time: 1:00 p.m. EST/12:00 p.m. CST
- Game weather: None (indoor stadium)
- Game attendance: 69,879
- Referee: Walt Coleman
- TV announcers (CBS): Greg Gumbel, Trent Green and Jamie Erdahl
- Recap, Game Book

Game information

**First quarter**

- ATL – Devonta Freeman 1-yard run (Matt Bryant kick), 10:02. Falcons 7–0. **Drive: 10 plays, 81 yards, 4:58.**
- KC – Spencer Ware 3-yard run (kick blocked), 8:00. Falcons 7–6. **Drive: 4 plays, 72 yards, 2:02.**
- ATL – Matt Bryant 22-yard field goal, 5:11. Falcons 10–6. **Drive: 5 plays, 71 yards, 2:49.**

**Second quarter**

- ATL – Matt Bryant 22-yard field goal, 13:25. Falcons 13–6. **Drive: 11 plays, 53 yards, 4:26.**
- KC – Spencer Ware 3-yard pass from Alex Smith (Cairo Santos kick), 7:05. Tied 13–13. **Drive: 11 plays, 92 yards, 6:20.**
- KC – Eric Berry 37-yard interception return (Cairo Santos kick), 0:37. Chiefs 20–13.
- ATL – Matt Bryant 59-yard field goal, 0:00. Chiefs 20–16. **Drive: 5 plays, 33 yards, 0:37.**

**Third quarter**

- KC – Albert Wilson 55-yard run (Cairo Santos kick), 12:52. Chiefs 27–16. **Drive: 4 plays, 64 yards, 2:08.**

**Fourth quarter**

- ATL – Devonta Freeman 1-yard run (pass failed), 11:57. Chiefs 27–22. **Drive: 11 plays, 80 yards, 6:12.**
- ATL – Aldrick Robinson 5-yard pass from Matt Ryan, 4:32. Falcons 28–27. **Drive: 10 plays, 80 yards, 4:53.**
- KC – Eric Berry defensive two-point conversion, 4:32. Chiefs 29–28.

**Top passers**

- KC – Alex Smith – 21/25, 270 yards, TD
- ATL – Matt Ryan – 22/34, 297 yards, TD, INT

**Top rushers**

- KC – Albert Wilson – 1 rush, 55 yards, TD
- ATL – Devonta Freeman – 15 rushes, 56 yards, 2 TD

**Top receivers**

- KC – Travis Kelce – 8 receptions, 140 yards
- ATL – Julio Jones – 7 receptions, 113 yards

==== Week 14: vs. Oakland Raiders ====
Week 14: Oakland Raiders at Kansas City Chiefs – Game summary

Quarter	1	2	3	4	Total
Raiders	3	7	3	0	**13**
**Chiefs**	0	21	0	0	**21**

at Arrowhead Stadium, Kansas City, Missouri

- Date: December 8
- Game time: 7:25 p.m. CST
- Game weather: Clear, 21 °F (−6 °C)
- Game attendance: 75,191
- Referee: Terry McAulay
- TV announcers (NBC/NFLN/Twitter): Al Michaels, Cris Collinsworth and Heather Cox
- Recap, Game Book

Game information

**First quarter**

- OAK – Sebastian Janikowski 44-yard field goal, 11:34. Raiders 3–0. **Drive: 7 plays, 12 yards, 1:53.**

**Second quarter**

- KC – Tyreek Hill 36-yard pass from Alex Smith (Cairo Santos kick), 14:51. Chiefs 7–3. **Drive: 5 plays, 70 yards, 1:38.**
- KC – Charcandrick West 3-yard run (Cairo Santos kick), 8:34. Chiefs 14–3. **Drive: 7 plays, 78 yards, 4:56.**
- KC – Tyreek Hill 78-yard punt return (Cairo Santos kick), 6:25. Chiefs 21–3.
- OAK – Latavius Murray 1-yard run (Sebastian Janikowski kick), 0:14. Chiefs 21–10. **Drive: 14 plays, 92 yards, 6:11.**

**Third quarter**

- OAK – Sebastian Janikowski 33-yard field goal, 13:09. Chiefs 21–13. **Drive: 4 plays, 4 yards, 0:57.**

**Fourth quarter**

- No scoring plays.

**Top passers**

- OAK – Derek Carr – 17/41, 117 yards
- KC – Alex Smith – 17/26, 264 yards, TD, INT

**Top rushers**

- OAK – Latavius Murray – 22 rushes, 103 yards, TD
- KC – Spencer Ware – 10 rushes, 56 yards

**Top receivers**

- OAK – Amari Cooper – 5 receptions, 29 yards
- KC – Travis Kelce – 5 receptions, 101 yards

==== Week 15: vs. Tennessee Titans ====
Week 15: Tennessee Titans at Kansas City Chiefs – Game summary

Quarter	1	2	3	4	Total
**Titans**	0	7	0	12	**19**
Chiefs	14	3	0	0	**17**

at Arrowhead Stadium, Kansas City, Missouri

- Date: December 18
- Game time: 12:00 p.m. CST
- Game weather: Sunny, 1 °F (−17 °C)
- Game attendance: 68,084
- Referee: John Hussey
- TV announcers (CBS): Greg Gumbel, Trent Green and Jamie Erdahl
- Recap, Game Book

Game information

**First quarter**

- KC – Tyreek Hill 68-yard run (Cairo Santos kick), 11:43. Chiefs 7–0. **Drive: 2 plays, 74 yards, 0:51.**
- KC – Alex Smith 10-yard run (Cairo Santos kick), 4:24. Chiefs 14–0. **Drive: 4 plays, 53 yards, 2:20.**

**Second quarter**

- TEN – Derrick Henry 4-yard run (Ryan Succop kick), 11:58. Chiefs 14–7. **Drive: 6 plays, 87 yards, 3:33.**
- KC – Cairo Santos 34-yard field goal, 0:13. Chiefs 17–7. **Drive: 8 plays, 29 yards, 1:29.**

**Third quarter**

- No scoring plays.

**Fourth quarter**

- TEN – Ryan Succop 39-yard field goal, 11:54. Chiefs 17–10. **Drive: 11 plays, 51 yards, 3:26.**
- TEN – Derrick Henry 1-yard run (pass failed), 3:12. Chiefs 17–16. **Drive: 12 plays, 88 yards, 4:42.**
- TEN – Ryan Succop 53-yard field goal, 0:00. Titans 19–17. **Drive: 6 plays, 40 yards, 1:07.**

**Top passers**

- TEN – Marcus Mariota – 19/33, 241 yards, INT
- KC – Alex Smith – 15/28, 163 yards, INT

**Top rushers**

- TEN – DeMarco Murray – 18 rushes, 89 yards
- KC – Spencer Ware – 18 rushes, 70 yards

**Top receivers**

- TEN – Rishard Matthews – 4 receptions, 105 yards
- KC – Jeremy Maclin – 6 receptions, 82 yards

==== Week 16: vs. Denver Broncos ====
Christmas Day games

Week 16: Denver Broncos at Kansas City Chiefs – Game summary

Quarter	1	2	3	4	Total
Broncos	7	3	0	0	**10**
**Chiefs**	21	0	0	12	**33**

at Arrowhead Stadium, Kansas City, Missouri

- Date: December 25
- Game time: 7:30 p.m. CST
- Game weather: Cloudy, rain, 53 °F (12 °C)
- Game attendance: 76,671
- Referee: Tony Corrente
- TV announcers (NBC): Al Michaels, Cris Collinsworth and Michele Tafoya
- Recap, Game Book

Game information

**First quarter**

- KC – Alex Smith 10-yard run (Cairo Santos kick), 8:59. Chiefs 7–0. **Drive: 7 plays, 77 yards, 3:51.**
- KC – Tyreek Hill 70-yard run (Cairo Santos kick), 5:17. Chiefs 14–0. **Drive: 4 plays, 81 yards, 2:12.**
- DEN – Justin Forsett 1-yard run (Brandon McManus kick), 1:54. Chiefs 14–7. **Drive: 2 plays, 6 yards, 0:41.**
- KC – Travis Kelce 80-yard pass from Alex Smith (Cairo Santos kick), 0:53. Chiefs 21–7. **Drive: 2 plays, 84 yards, 1:01.**

**Second quarter**

- DEN – Brandon McManus 52-yard field goal, 6:38. Chiefs 21–10. **Drive: 6 plays, 37 yards, 1:47.**

**Third quarter**

- No scoring plays.

**Fourth quarter**

- KC – Cairo Santos 27-yard field goal, 11:59. Chiefs 24–10. **Drive: 11 plays, 53 yards, 5:59.**
- KC – Cairo Santos 39-yard field goal, 8:51. Chiefs 27–10. **Drive: 6 plays, 15 yards, 2:58.**
- KC – Demetrius Harris 2-yard pass from Dontari Poe (kick failed, wide left), 1:52. Chiefs 33–10. **Drive: 10 plays, 43 yards, 4:31.**

**Top passers**

- DEN – Trevor Siemian – 17/43, 183 yards, INT
- KC – Alex Smith – 25/36, 244 yards, TD, INT

**Top rushers**

- DEN – Devontae Booker – 5 rushes, 44 yards
- KC – Tyreek Hill – 6 rushes, 95 yards, TD

**Top receivers**

- DEN – Devontae Booker – 6 receptions, 44 yards
- KC – Travis Kelce – 11 receptions, 160 yards, TD

==== Week 17: at San Diego Chargers ====
Week 17: Kansas City Chiefs at San Diego Chargers – Game summary

Quarter	1	2	3	4	Total
**Chiefs**	3	17	14	3	**37**
Chargers	3	7	7	10	**27**

at Qualcomm Stadium, San Diego, California

- Date: January 1, 2017
- Game time: 3:25 p.m. CST/1:25 p.m. PST
- Game weather: Cloudy, 59 °F (15 °C)
- Game attendance: 54,915
- Referee: Walt Anderson
- TV announcers (CBS): Greg Gumbel, Trent Green and Jamie Erdahl
- Recap, Game Book

Game information

**First quarter**

- SD – Josh Lambo 35-yard field goal, 10:16. Chargers 3–0. **Drive: 10 plays, 55 yards, 4:44.**
- KC – Cairo Santos 35-yard field goal, 5:20. Tied 3–3. **Drive: 10 plays, 53 yards, 4:56.**

**Second quarter**

- SD – Antonio Gates 2-yard pass from Philip Rivers (Josh Lambo kick), 14:49. Chargers 10–3. **Drive: 11 plays, 76 yards, 5:31.**
- KC – Alex Smith 5-yard run (Cairo Santos kick), 12:53. Tied 10–10. **Drive: 4 plays, 75 yards, 1:56.**
- KC – Charcandrick West 4-yard pass from Alex Smith (Cairo Santos kick), 6:09. Chiefs 17–10. **Drive: 9 plays, 34 yards, 4:26.**
- KC – Cairo Santos 25-yard field goal, 0:00. Chiefs 20–10. **Drive: 8 plays, 73 yards, 1:10.**

**Third quarter**

- SD – Jahleel Addae 90-yard interception return (Josh Lambo kick), 10:23. Chiefs 20–17.
- KC – Charcandrick West 2-yard pass from Alex Smith (Cairo Santos kick), 3:48. Chiefs 27–17. **Drive: 12 plays, 60 yards, 6:35.**
- KC – Tyreek Hill 95-yard punt return (Cairo Santos kick), 0:59. Chiefs 34–17.

**Fourth quarter**

- SD – Josh Lambo 29-yard field goal, 10:19. Chiefs 34–20. **Drive: 14 plays, 64 yards, 5:40.**
- KC – Cairo Santos 37-yard field goal, 4:31. Chiefs 37–20. **Drive: 10 plays, 31 yards, 5:48.**
- SD – Hunter Henry 12-yard pass from Philip Rivers (Josh Lambo kick), 2:08. Chiefs 37–27. **Drive: 10 plays, 89 yards, 2:23.**

**Top passers**

- KC – Alex Smith – 21/28, 264 yards, 2 TD, INT
- SD – Philip Rivers – 22/38, 269 yards, 2 TD, 2 INT

**Top rushers**

- KC – Charcandrick West – 16 rushes, 58 yards
- SD – Andre Williams – 18 rushes, 87 yards

**Top receivers**

- KC – Charcandrick West – 5 receptions, 58 yards, 2 TD
- SD – Tyrell Williams – 6 receptions, 70 yards

=== Standings ===
==== Division ====
AFC West
	W	L	T	PCT	DIV	CONF	PF	PA	STK
^{(2)} Kansas City Chiefs	12	4	0	.750	6–0	9–3	389	311	W2
^{(5)} Oakland Raiders	12	4	0	.750	3–3	9–3	416	385	L1
Denver Broncos	9	7	0	.563	2–4	6–6	333	297	W1
San Diego Chargers	5	11	0	.313	1–5	4–8	410	423	L5

==== Conference ====
AFC
#	Team	Division	W	L	T	PCT	DIV	CONF	SOS	SOV	STK
**Division leaders**
1	New England Patriots	East	14	2	0	.875	5–1	11–1	.439	.424	W7
2 (Note: Kansas City clinched the AFC West division over Oakland based on head-to-head sweep.)	Kansas City Chiefs	West	12	4	0	.750	6–0	9–3	.508	.479	W2
3	Pittsburgh Steelers	North	11	5	0	.688	5–1	9–3	.494	.423	W7
4 (Note: Houston clinched the AFC South division title over Tennessee based on record vs. division opponents.)	Houston Texans	South	9	7	0	.563	5–1	7–5	.502	.427	L1
**Wild Cards**
5	Oakland Raiders	West	12	4	0	.750	3–3	9–3	.504	.443	L1
6	Miami Dolphins	East	10	6	0	.625	4–2	7–5	.455	.341	L1
**Did not qualify for the postseason**
7 (Note: Tennessee finished ahead of Denver based on head-to-head victory.)	Tennessee Titans	South	9	7	0	.563	2–4	6–6	.465	.458	W1
8	Denver Broncos	West	9	7	0	.563	2–4	6–6	.549	.455	W1
9 (Note: Baltimore finished ahead of Indianapolis based on record vs. conference opponents.)	Baltimore Ravens	North	8	8	0	.500	4–2	7–5	.498	.363	L2
10	Indianapolis Colts	South	8	8	0	.500	3–3	5–7	.492	.406	W1
11	Buffalo Bills	East	7	9	0	.438	1–5	4–8	.482	.339	L2
12	Cincinnati Bengals	North	6	9	1	.406	3–3	5–7	.521	.333	W1
13 (Note: The New York Jets finished ahead of San Diego based record vs. common opponents — the Jets' cumulative record against Cleveland, Indianapolis, Kansas City and Miami was 1–4, while San Diego's cumulative record against the same four teams was 0–5.)	New York Jets	East	5	11	0	.313	2–4	4–8	.518	.313	W1
14	San Diego Chargers	West	5	11	0	.313	1–5	4–8	.543	.513	L5
15	Jacksonville Jaguars	South	3	13	0	.188	2–4	2–10	.527	.417	L1
16	Cleveland Browns	North	1	15	0	.063	0–6	1–11	.549	.313	L1
**Tiebreakers** (Note: When breaking ties for three or more teams under the NFL's rules, they are first broken within divisions, then comparing only the highest ranked remaining team from each division.)

== Postseason ==
=== Schedule ===
Round	Date	Opponent (seed)	Result	Record	Venue	Recap
Wild Card	First-round bye					
Divisional	January 15	Pittsburgh Steelers (3)	L 16–18	0–1	Arrowhead Stadium	Recap

=== Game summaries ===
==== AFC Divisional Playoffs: vs. (3) Pittsburgh Steelers ====
AFC Divisional Playoffs: (3) Pittsburgh Steelers at (2) Kansas City Chiefs – Game summary

Quarter	1	2	3	4	Total
Steelers	6	6	3	3	18
Chiefs	7	0	3	6	16

at Arrowhead Stadium, Kansas City, Missouri

- Date: January 15, 2017
- Game time: 7:20 p.m. CST
- Game weather: Cloudy with patches of fog, 33 °F (1 °C)
- Game attendance: 75,678
- Referee: Carl Cheffers
- TV announcers (NBC): Al Michaels, Cris Collinsworth, Michele Tafoya and Heather Cox
- Recap, Game Book

Game information

First quarter

- PIT – Chris Boswell 22-yard field goal, 9:38. Steelers 3–0. Drive: 11 plays, 66 yards, 5:22.
- KC – Albert Wilson 5-yard pass from Alex Smith (Cairo Santos kick), 6:09. Chiefs 7–3. Drive: 6 plays, 55 yards, 3:29.
- PIT – Chris Boswell 38-yard field goal, 3:51. Chiefs 7–6. Drive: 7 plays, 55 yards, 2:18.

Second quarter

- PIT – Chris Boswell 36-yard field goal, 9:18. Steelers 9–7. Drive: 14 plays, 53 yards, 6:30.
- PIT – Chris Boswell 45-yard field goal, 0:55. Steelers 12–7. Drive: 9 plays, 28 yards, 4:08.

Third quarter

- PIT – Chris Boswell 43-yard field goal, 10:06. Steelers 15–7. Drive: 7 plays, 49 yards, 3:42.
- KC – Cairo Santos 48-yard field goal, 0:10. Steelers 15–10. Drive: 7 plays, 16 yards, 2:50.

Fourth quarter

- PIT – Chris Boswell 43-yard field goal, 9:49. Steelers 18–10. Drive: 10 plays, 45 yards, 5:21.
- KC – Spencer Ware 1-yard run (pass failed), 2:43. Steelers 18–16. Drive: 13 plays, 75 yards, 7:06.

Top passers

- PIT – Ben Roethlisberger – 20/31, 224 yards, INT
- KC – Alex Smith – 20/34, 172 yards, TD, INT

Top rushers

- PIT – Le'Veon Bell – 30 rushes, 170 yards
- KC – Spencer Ware – 8 rushes, 35 yards, TD

Top receivers

- PIT – Antonio Brown – 6 receptions, 108 yards
- KC – Travis Kelce – 5 receptions, 77 yards
