= Deveron (given name) =

Deveron is a given name. Notable people with the name include:

- Deveron Carr (born 1990), American football player
- Deveron Harper (born 1977), American football player
