= Spencer Ware =

American football player (born 1991)

No. 44, 32, 39
- Position: Running back

Personal information
- Born: November 23, 1991 (age 34); Sharonville, Ohio, U.S.
- Listed height: 5 ft 10 in (1.78 m)
- Listed weight: 229 lb (104 kg)

Career information
- High school: Princeton (Sharonville)
- College: LSU (2010–2012)
- NFL draft: 2013: 6th round, 194th overall pick

Career history
- Seattle Seahawks (2013); Kansas City Chiefs (2015–2018); Indianapolis Colts (2019); Kansas City Chiefs (2019); Chicago Bears (2020)*
- * Offseason or practice squad member only

Awards and highlights
- 2× Super Bowl champion (XLVIII, LIV); Second-team All-SEC (2011)

Career NFL statistics
- Rushing yards: 1,631
- Rushing average: 4.6
- Rushing touchdowns: 11
- Receptions: 64
- Receiving yards: 698
- Receiving touchdowns: 2
- Stats at Pro Football Reference

Spencer Raleigh Ware III (born November 23, 1991) is an American former professional football player who was a running back in the National Football League (NFL). He played college football for the LSU Tigers, and played in the 2010 U.S. Army All-American Bowl. Ware was selected by the Seattle Seahawks in the sixth round of the 2013 NFL draft, with whom he won Super Bowl XLVIII as a rookie. Ware was also a member of the Kansas City Chiefs, Indianapolis Colts, and Chicago Bears and won Super Bowl LIV with the Chiefs.

== Early life ==
Ware attended and played high school football at Princeton High School.

== College career ==
During his college football career, Ware rushed for 1,240 yards on 292 carries with 10 touchdowns. Southeastern Conference coaches named him a second-team All-SEC selection after the 2011 season. Ware also played 21 games for the LSU Tigers baseball team.

After his junior season, Ware decided to forgo his senior season and entered the 2013 NFL draft.

== Professional career ==
Pre-draft measurables
Height	Weight	Arm length	Hand span	40-yard dash	20-yard shuttle	Three-cone drill	Vertical jump	Broad jump	Bench press
5 ft 10 1/8 in (1.78 m)	228 lb (103 kg)	30 1/8 in (0.77 m)	9 5/8 in (0.24 m)	4.62 s	4.27 s	7.07 s	35.5 in (0.90 m)	9 ft 11 in (3.02 m)	17 reps

=== Seattle Seahawks ===
Ware was selected by the Seattle Seahawks in the sixth round of the 2013 NFL draft with the 194th overall pick. He appeared in two games as a rookie and recorded three carries for ten yards. While Ware saw sparse usage throughout the season, the Seahawks went on to win the Super Bowl against the Denver Broncos in Super Bowl XLVIII. He was released on August 20, 2014.

=== Kansas City Chiefs (first stint) ===
On December 31, 2014, Ware signed a future contract with the Kansas City Chiefs.

On September 5, 2015, he was waived by the Chiefs and was re-signed to the practice squad. Ware was activated off the practice squad for the Week 8 matchup against the Detroit Lions for the NFL game in London on November 1, 2015. In this game, Ware scored his first NFL touchdown, a four-yard run, in the waning minutes of the fourth quarter against the Detroit Lions. In Week 11, against the San Diego Chargers, he had two rushing touchdowns in the 33–3 victory. In the next game against the Buffalo Bills, he had 19 carries for 114 rushing yards and a rushing touchdown during the 30–22 victory. Ware ended the 2015 season playing in 11 games with two starts, rushing for 403 yards and six touchdowns. He scored a rushing touchdown in the Chiefs' Wild Card Round victory over the Houston Texans.

In 2016, with starter Jamaal Charles coming off a knee injury suffered in 2015, Ware became the starter for 2016. In Week 1, against the San Diego Chargers, he had 199 scrimmage yards (70 rushing, 129 receiving) and a rushing touchdown in the 33–27 victory. In Week 6, against the Oakland Raiders, he had 24 carries for 131 rushing yards and a rushing touchdown in the 26–10 victory. He started 14 games, rushing for 921 yards and three touchdowns. In addition, he caught 33 passes for 447 yards and two touchdowns.

Coming into the 2017 season, Ware was projected to be the Chiefs' starting running back after the release of longtime starter Jamaal Charles. In the team's third preseason game against the Seattle Seahawks, Ware suffered a torn PCL and additional knee damage. He was placed on injured reserve on September 2, 2017.

On November 30, 2018, Ware was named starting running back for the Kansas City Chiefs following the release of starting running back Kareem Hunt after he misled the team regarding an assault alleged to have occurred earlier that year. In his first game as the new starter, Ware achieved 47 rushing yards and one rushing touchdown against the Oakland Raiders. He had 129 scrimmage yards in the 27–24 victory over the Baltimore Ravens in Week 14. Ware finished the 2018 season with 246 rushing yards and two rushing touchdowns.

=== Indianapolis Colts ===
On April 30, 2019, Ware signed with the Indianapolis Colts. He was placed on the reserve/physically unable to perform list on August 2, after undergoing ankle surgery. Ware was released on September 20.

=== Kansas City Chiefs (second stint) ===
On December 3, 2019, Ware was re-signed by the Chiefs. He was placed on injured reserve on December 25, with a shoulder injury. Ware finished the 2019 season with 17 carries for 51 rushing yards in three games. Without Ware, the Chiefs would go on to win Super Bowl LIV against the San Francisco 49ers giving Ware his second Super Bowl ring.

=== Chicago Bears ===
On December 22, 2020, Ware signed with the practice squad of the Chicago Bears. His practice squad contract with the team expired after the season on January 18, 2021.

== Career statistics ==
=== NFL ===
Season	Team	Games		Rushing					Receiving					Fumbles	
Season	Team	GP	GS	Att	Yds	Avg	Lng	TD	Rec	Yds	Avg	Lng	TD	Fum	Lost
2013	SEA	2	0	3	10	3.3	5	0	0	0	0.0	0	0	0	0
2015	KC	11	2	72	403	5.6	52	6	6	5	0.8	5	0	0	0
2016	KC	14	14	214	921	4.3	46	3	33	447	13.5	46T	2	4	3
2018	KC	13	2	51	246	4.8	34	2	20	224	11.2	31	0	0	0
2019	KC	3	1	17	51	3.0	6	0	5	22	4.4	18	0	1	0
Total		43	19	357	1,631	4.6	52	11	64	698	10.9	46T	2	5	3

=== College ===
Year	School	Conf	Class	Pos	G	Rushing				Receiving			
Year	School	Conf	Class	Pos	G	Att	Yds	Avg	TD	Rec	Yds	Avg	TD
2010	LSU	SEC	FR	RB	11	24	175	7.3	1	10	101	10.1	0
2011	LSU	SEC	SO	RB	13	177	707	4.0	8	11	73	6.6	1
2012	LSU	SEC	JR	RB	12	94	367	3.9	1	18	230	12.8	1
Career	LSU				36	295	1249	4.2	10	39	404	10.4	2

== Personal life ==
On January 12, 2014, Ware was booked in Seattle's King County Jail under the charge of DUI. However, that case was dismissed in July 2014 after a judge ruled that the officer lacked reasonable suspicion of DUI at the time he initiated the traffic stop.

On June 23, 2016, Ware hosted an event at Full Throttle Indoor Karting "where he provided free transportation, go-karting, and lunch to the thirty kids of the [Winton Hills] Recreational Center." Ware expressed gratitude for all the people who helped him become a professional athlete and encouraged the kids to "work together" to accomplish their goals in life.
