= Dontari Poe =

American football player (born 1990)

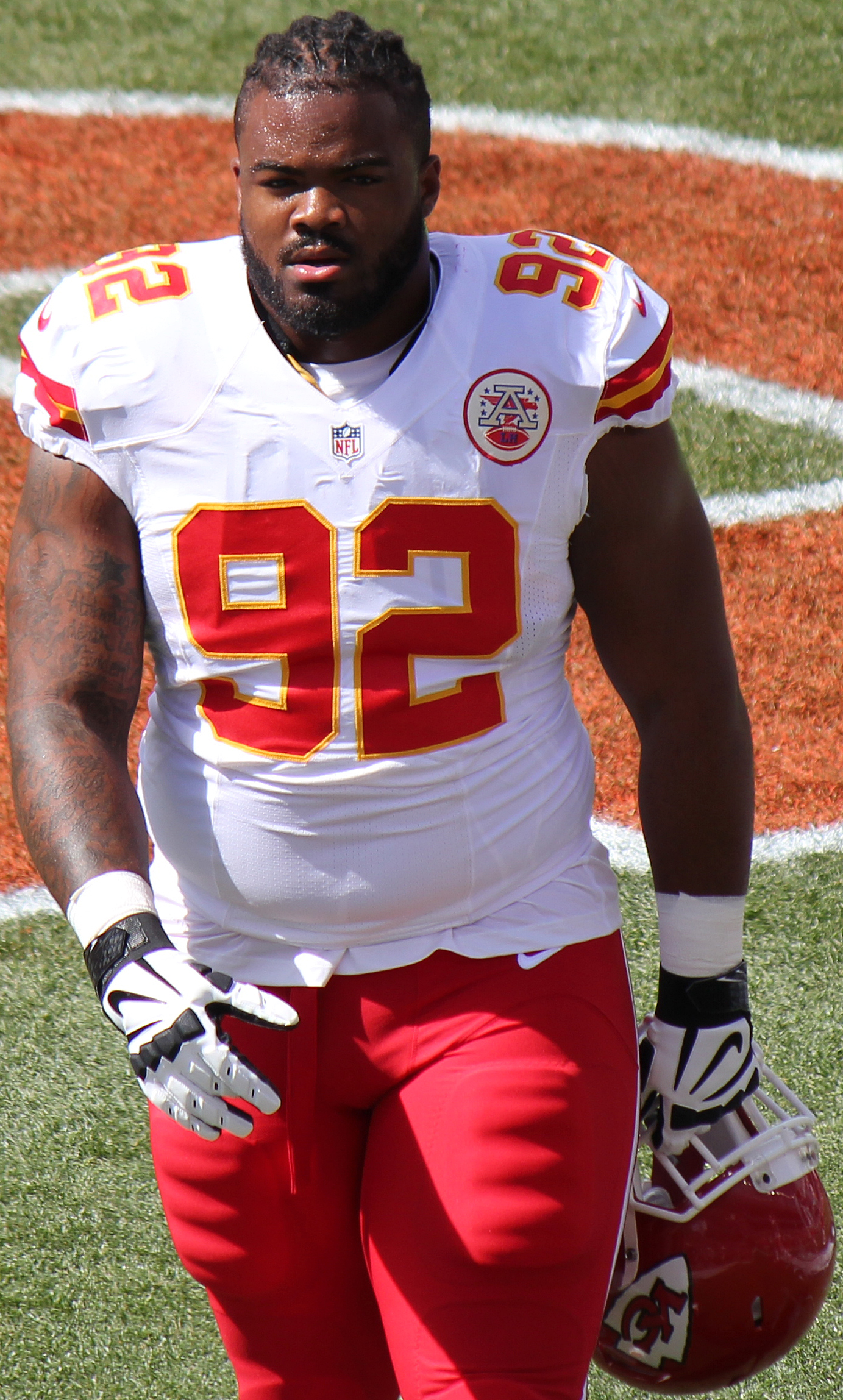
- Poe with the Kansas City Chiefs in 2014

No. 92, 95
- Position: Nose tackle

Personal information
- Born: August 18, 1990 (age 36); Memphis, Tennessee, U.S.
- Listed height: 6 ft 3 in (1.91 m)
- Listed weight: 342 lb (155 kg)

Career information
- High school: Wooddale (Memphis)
- College: Memphis (2008–2011)
- NFL draft: 2012: 1st round, 11th overall pick

Career history
- Kansas City Chiefs (2012–2016); Atlanta Falcons (2017); Carolina Panthers (2018–2019); Dallas Cowboys (2020)

Awards and highlights
- Second-team All-Pro (2013); 2× Pro Bowl (2013, 2014); Second-team All-C-USA (2011); C-USA All-Freshman (2009)

Career NFL statistics
- Games played: 128
- Total tackles: 285
- Sacks: 20.5
- Forced fumbles: 2
- Fumble recoveries: 1
- Total touchdowns: 3
- Stats at Pro Football Reference

Dontari Poe (born August 18, 1990) is an American former professional football player who was a nose tackle for nine seasons in the National Football League (NFL). He played college football for the Memphis Tigers and was selected by the Kansas City Chiefs 11th overall in the 2012 NFL draft. Though primarily a defensive lineman, at 6 ft 3 in and 346 lbs, he is also known for being the largest player to either rush or pass for a touchdown while also having a 100% pass completion percentage, passing touchdown, and rushing touchdown. He also played for the Atlanta Falcons, Carolina Panthers and Dallas Cowboys.

== Early life ==
Poe entered Wooddale High School in Memphis, Tennessee, without any prior football experience. His coach, Cedric Miller, had spotted Poe practicing with the marching band in the summer before Poe's freshman year at Wooddale, and told him to report to football practice the next day.

By his junior season, he was an all-state honorable mention defensive lineman and credited with 63 tackles and eight sacks. Besides his hometown school Memphis, he was recruited by Auburn, Colorado, and Mississippi. Ole Miss invited him to their annual Junior Day. Particularly keen on early playing time, Poe also liked Auburn, because "they have two defensive tackles Quentin Groves and Pat Sims that are leaving early, so there is a good chance I will play early if I go there."

Also a talented shot putter, Poe earned the Class 3-A title at the state meet with a throw of 56 ft 3 1/4 in (17.15 m) as a junior. In his senior year, he defended his title with a throw of 54 ft 1 1/4 in (16.49 m), and also won the discus throw in the state meet with a personal best throw of 156 ft 1 in (47.57 m). Poe claimed city, district and region track titles as a senior.

Poe was regarded only as a two-star prospect by both Rivals.com and Scout.com. He was ranked No. 92 by Scout, in a crop of defensive tackles that was highlighted by Marcus Forston and DeAngelo Tyson, while Rivals did not have him listed among their top 75 defensive tackles, but as the No. 19 overall prospect out of Tennessee.

College recruiting
Name	Hometown	School	Height	Weight	40^{‡}	Commit date
Dontari Poe; DT	Memphis, Tennessee	Wooddale (TN)	6 ft 3 in (1.91 m)	315 lb (143 kg)	5.0	Feb 6, 2008
Dontari Poe; DT	Recruit ratings: Scout: Rivals: (74)					
Overall recruit ranking: Scout: 92 (DT) Rivals: NR (DT), 19 (TN) ESPN: 69 (DT)
Note: In many cases, Scout, Rivals, 247Sports, On3, and ESPN may conflict in their listings of height and weight.; In these cases, the average was taken. ESPN grades are on a 100-point scale.; Sources: "Memphis Football Commitments". Rivals.; "2008 Memphis Football Commits". Scout.; "ESPN". ESPN.; "Scout.com Team Recruiting Rankings". Scout.; "2008 Team Ranking". Rivals.com.

== College career ==
Poe played for the Memphis Tigers football team of the University of Memphis from 2009 to 2011. As a redshirt freshman in 2009, he played in 11 of 12 games for the Tigers—he did not play against Houston (November 21) due to a death in his family—including six starts at nose tackle, and finished the year with 27 tackles, including 18 solo stops. He led the team in tackles for losses with seven, and tied for the team lead in forced fumbles with three. He also added two quarterback sacks, which tied for third-most. His performance earned him a Conference USA All-Freshman Team selection.

In his sophomore year, Poe became a consistent starter on the defensive line. He was one of six Tigers to start all 12 games in 2010, and ended the year ranked fifth on the team in tackles with 41, and fourth in TFL with 6.5 (for a total loss of 27 yards). In the season opener against Mississippi State, he registered three tackles (all solo stops), all of which limited the Bulldogs to three or fewer yards, including one that was for a loss of four yards. In a game versus UTEP, Poe had a season-high seven tackles, four of which limited the Miners to fewer than three yards. He also managed to sack UTEP quarterback Trevor Vittatoe on a 3rd-and-8 in the first quarter for a loss of five yards. In October at Louisville, Poe registered six tackles (four solo). In recognition of his successful season, Poe earned an All-Conference-USA honorable mention.

Prior to his junior season, he drew attention for his weight room performance and was named one of the "10 strongest men in college football" by ESPN's Bruce Feldman. During the season, Poe started all 12 games on the defensive line and recorded at least one tackle in each game, tallying 33 tackles, 18 of which were solo stops. He also ranked third on the team with eight TFLs (for a loss of 26 yards). In November, in a game against Marshall, Poe tied his career high in tackles with eight. He was selected second-team All-Conference USA, and was listed as an honorable mention All-America pick by Pro Football Weekly, which evaluates players on NFL prospects and draft value rather just college production.

On December 23, 2011, Poe announced that he would forgo his senior season and enter the 2012 NFL draft. Soon thereafter, he announced that he signed with agent Jimmy Sexton of Creative Artists Agency. He concluded his college career having played in 35 contests (30 starts), recording 101 tackles (57 unassisted), 21.5 TFL, five sacks, four pass break-ups and four forced fumbles.

== Professional career ==
=== 2012 NFL draft ===
Can you believe he ran the 40-yard dash in 4.98 seconds? Poe looks like a refrigerator. He's not supposed to move like that. The most impressive part was his first 10 yards. He showed some explosiveness, and forgive me for saying this, but I saw a little bit of myself in him.

— Warren Sapp, former defensive tackle and hall of famer.

Entering the NFL Combine as a potential first rounder, Poe impressed with an "epic workout performance" according to ESPN's Todd McShay, who afterwards projected him to go as high as No. 11 to the Kansas City Chiefs. NFL.com draft analyst Mike Mayock upgraded Poe from No. 3 to No. 1 in his defensive tackle positional ranking. Poe particularly impressed with a 4.98 sec 40-yard dash, despite at 346 pounds (157 kg) being the fifth-heaviest defensive linemen to weigh in at the NFL Combine since 2000—behind only Terrence Cody, Ahmad Childress, Frank Okam, and Alameda Ta'amu. Additionally, he recorded 44 repetitions in the bench press, which tied Brodrick Bunkley for fourth-most since 2000. Due to his raw athleticism, some in the media afterwards compared him to All-Pro defensive lineman Haloti Ngata. Barack Obama referred to Poe while making a guest appearance on The B.S. Report stating; "They just had the Combine and they were talking about some guy who's like 340 and runs a 4.8 and has a three-foot vertical," Obama said. "I don't know what you do if a guy like that hits you."

Pre-draft measurables
Height	Weight	Arm length	Hand span	Wingspan	40-yard dash	10-yard split	20-yard split	20-yard shuttle	Three-cone drill	Vertical jump	Broad jump	Bench press
6 ft 3 1/2 in (1.92 m)	346 lb (157 kg)	32 in (0.81 m)	9 5/8 in (0.24 m)	6 ft 6 3/8 in (1.99 m)	4.98 s	1.69 s	2.86 s	4.56 s	7.90 s	29.5 in (0.75 m)	8 ft 9 in (2.67 m)	44 reps
All values from NFL Combine

Poe was originally perceived as "the ideal two-gap 3–4 nose tackle" due to his massive frame, but former NFL defensive lineman John Thornton described Poe as "more of a move guy than a big space eater", able to play in a 4–3 defense, too. However, Thornton also uttered concerns over Poe's mediocre college career. According to Jonathan Bales of The New York Times, Poe was "the ultimate boom-or-bust prospect—loaded with potential, but failing to capitalize on it in college." The Sporting News compared Poe to Ryan Sims and Jimmy Kennedy, two highly selected lineman who "were immensely talented yet struggled because of inconsistent effort and competitiveness".

In March 2012, Poe's draft stock peaked when he was listed at No. 9 by ESPN's Mel Kiper, Jr., and No. 6 by Sports Illustrated's Don Banks. "He'll be overdrafted," an unnamed NFL scout told the Times of Trenton, while nevertheless acknowledging that "he's the most athletic over 300-pound man in this draft, or a lot of other drafts." After analysing game tape, Mike Mayock downgraded Poe from No. 1 to No. 4 among defensive tackles, describing him as "a freaky athlete with a good motor" who, however, "needs to get into a good locker room with a mentor in that defensive line group" to develop into a high-quality NFL player. While acknowledging his lack of production in college, Bucky Brooks pointed out "Poe's blue-chip qualities (size, athleticism and strength) and the immense importance of the [nose tackle] position". According to The Sporting News's Russ Lande, Poe's draft stock plummeted in the weeks before the draft, amid concerns over his poor production at Memphis.

Sports Illustrated graded Poe as the No. 2 defensive tackle in the draft, behind only Fletcher Cox. Eventually, he was the first defensive lineman off the board, selected eleventh overall by the Kansas City Chiefs. Poe was the highest drafted player from Memphis since Keith Simpson (No. 9 in 1978), and the highest drafted player from Conference USA ever. He was also the third defensive lineman Kansas City selected in the first round within five years, following Glenn Dorsey and Tyson Jackson. Chiefs head coach, Romeo Crennel, said he was not worried about Poe's mediocre college statistics, "because he played every down at 350 pounds and he played every position on the line in every game."

=== Kansas City Chiefs ===
==== 2012 season ====
Poe was expected to succeed veteran Kelly Gregg at the defensive tackle position in Kansas City's 3–4 defense, although head coach Crennel acknowledged that "it's going to take a while for [Poe] to get adjusted." On the eve of training camp, July 26, 2012, Poe agreed to terms with the Chiefs, signing a four-year deal with a fifth-year team option. Per team policy, financial terms of the deal were not disclosed, but it was reported to be worth about $11 million. Competing with Anthony Toribio and Jerrell Powe for the starting nose tackle spot left void by Gregg, Poe disappointed in training camp. "He needs to work on technique, he needs to work on understanding the system, he needs to get the calls correct all the time. He's got a ways to go," said Crennel.

After spending the first three preseason games on the bench, Poe was moved into the starting lineup after Toribio injured his ankle. He established himself as a starter, and remained in the starting lineup for his entire rookie season, starting all 16 regular season games at nose tackle and being a three-down player for most of the season. He recorded 38 tackles, including 28 unassisted. Even though he did not record a quarterback sack, he was credited for his contributions as an inside rusher in obvious passing situations. Particularly, his efforts against the Pittsburgh Steelers in Week 10 and Cincinnati Bengals in Week 11 were praised. In Week 15, he registered a season-best five tackles in a loss against Oakland.

According to The Sporting News, Poe as a rookie appeared to be more advanced in grasping the Chiefs' two-gap system than either Dorsey or Jackson as a rookie. "I'm a much better player than when I first got here," Poe told the publication. "I came here a little afraid, but now I kind of know what's going on." The Kansas City Star named Poe the Chiefs' Rookie of the Year.

==== 2013 season ====
After not recording a quarterback sack in his rookie season, Poe tallied 3.5 sacks over the first two games of the 2013 NFL season. Increasingly drawing double-teams afterwards, he only added one sack over the rest of the season. Twelve games into his sophomore season, Poe lined up on 804 defensive snaps, which was 85 more than any other defensive tackle in the NFL that season. After the 2013 season concluded, Poe was selected to participate in the annual Pro Bowl.

==== 2014 season ====
During the 2014 season, Poe started all 16 games with six sacks and a pass defended on 46 tackles. He was selected to the Pro Bowl for a second year in a row.

==== 2015 season ====
During Week 11 against the San Diego Chargers, Poe became the heaviest player in NFL history to rush for a touchdown. He was only the sixth defensive lineman to rush for a touchdown. In 15 games, Poe made 39 tackles, 1 sack, 1 forced fumble, and 1 fumble recovery.

==== 2016 season ====
Poe scored his second rushing touchdown in as many attempts—this time actually receiving a lateral pass—in an October game against the Oakland Raiders in a play called "Hungry Pig Right" where four players lined up in a diamond formation sending "over 1,100 pounds rushing toward the end zone."

In a December 25 game against the Denver Broncos in Week 16, Poe became the largest player in NFL history to throw a touchdown pass. After being put in on offense, he lined up in the wildcat formation, took the direct snap, faked a run up the middle, then threw a touchdown pass to tight end Demetrius Harris while jumping in the air. In the post game press conference, Chiefs head coach Andy Reid called the play the "Bloated Tebow pass" referring to a play when Tim Tebow was the quarterback at Florida and he threw a touchdown pass while jumping after faking a quarterback sneak. In 16 games, Poe finished the year with 27 tackles, a forced fumble, 1.5 sacks, and three passes defended.

=== Atlanta Falcons ===
On March 16, 2017, Poe signed a one-year, $8 million contract with the Atlanta Falcons. Poe made a bonus of $125,000 after passing his July 26 weigh-in. He started all 16 games, making 39 tackles (4 for loss), 2.5 sacks, 10 quarterback pressures and 2 passes defensed.

=== Carolina Panthers ===
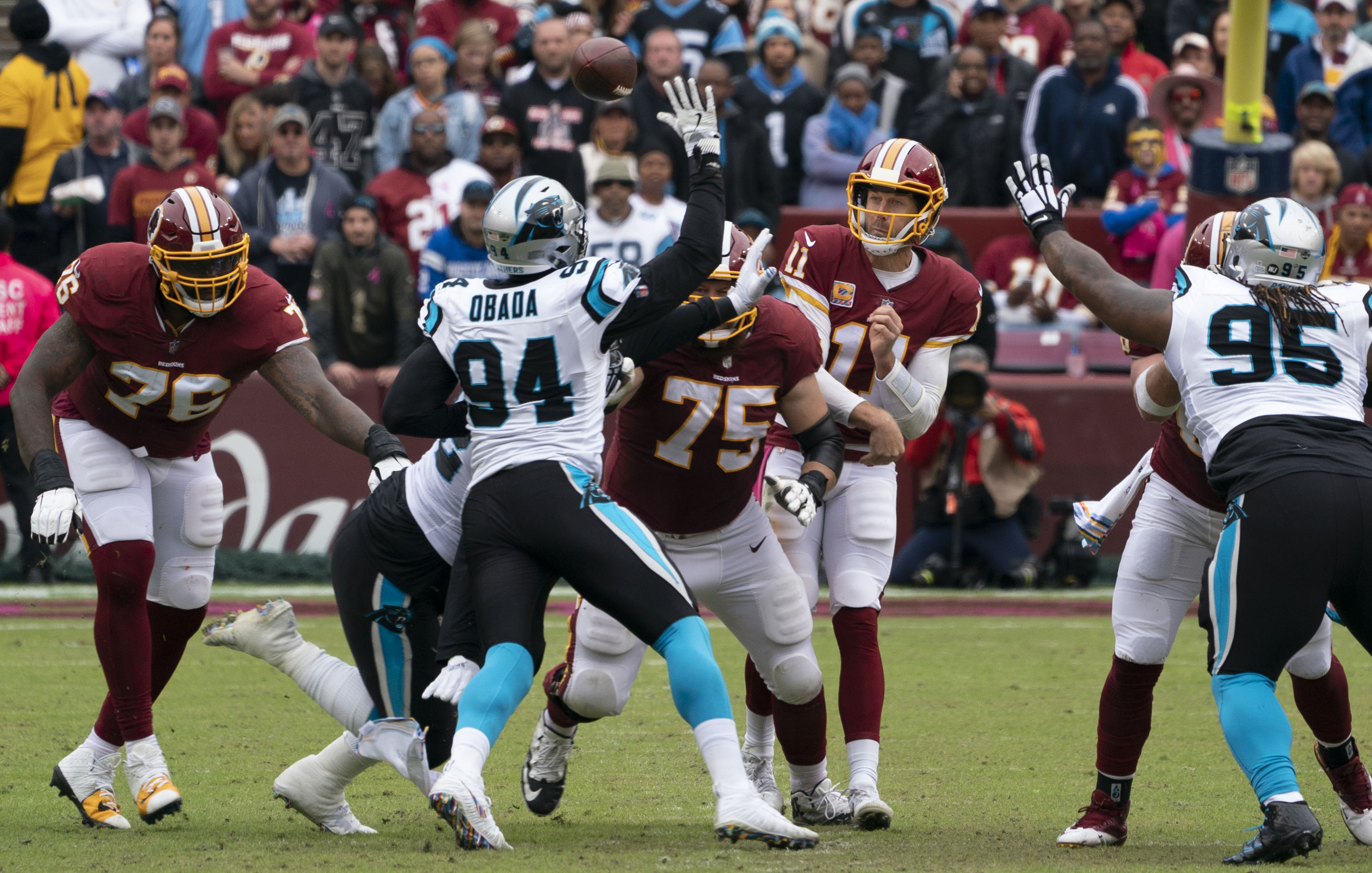
Poe (right) playing against the Washington Redskins in 2018.

On March 15, 2018, Poe signed a three-year, $27 million contract with the Carolina Panthers. In his first season in Carolina, Poe started all 16 games, recording 32 tackles, 6 quarterback pressures and one sack.

In 2019, Poe played in 11 games with 8 starts, before suffering a torn quad in Week 12 against the New Orleans Saints. He was placed on injured reserve on November 27, 2019. He finished the season with 19 tackles and four sacks.

The Panthers declined the option on Poe's contract making him a free agent in 2020.

=== Dallas Cowboys ===
On April 9, 2020, Poe signed a two-year contract with the Dallas Cowboys. He was placed on the active/physically unable to perform list at the start of training camp on July 28, 2020. He was moved back to the active roster on August 18, 2020. He was expected to start alongside Gerald McCoy at defensive tackle until he was lost for the season with a quadriceps tear injury. Poe started the first seven games mostly alongside Trysten Hill, while registering 9 tackles and no sacks. He was part of a struggling defense, especially against the run. In the season opener against the Los Angeles Rams, he became the first Cowboy to kneel during the national anthem since the start of the movement in 2016.

His defensive snaps began to decrease in Week 5, until being released on October 28, as part of a roster purge that included free agency acquisitions Everson Griffen and Daryl Worley. Team owner and general manager Jerry Jones, attributed the move to Poe's lackluster performance and being overweight.

=== NFL statistics ===
Year	Team	Games		Tackles				Interceptions						Fumbles			
Year	Team	GP	GS	Comb	Solo	Ast	Sack	Int	Yards	Avg	Lng	TD	PD	FF	FR	Yards	TD
2012	KC	16	16	38	28	10	0.0	0	0	0.0	0	0	4	0	0	0	0
2013	KC	15	15	51	43	8	4.5	0	0	0.0	0	0	4	0	0	0	0
2014	KC	16	16	45	37	8	6.0	0	0	0.0	0	0	1	0	0	0	0
2015	KC	15	13	39	29	10	1.0	0	0	0.0	0	0	0	1	1	0	0
2016	KC	16	16	27	18	9	1.5	0	0	0.0	0	0	3	1	0	0	0
2017	ATL	16	16	39	23	16	2.5	0	0	0.0	0	0	2	0	0	0	0
2018	CAR	16	16	17	9	8	1.0	0	0	0.0	0	0	0	0	0	0	0
2019	CAR	11	10	22	15	7	4.0	0	0	0.0	0	0	0	0	0	0	0
2020	DAL	7	7	7	3	4	0.0	0	0	0.0	0	0	0	0	0	0	0
Career		128	125	285	205	80	20.5	0	0	0.0	0	0	14	2	1	0	0

== Personal life ==
The youngest of three brothers (Pierre and Robert Jr.), Poe grew up in the Whitehaven neighborhood of Memphis, Tennessee. Peter Schrager of Fox Sports compared Poe's background to Michael Oher's, which has been the subject of the 2006 book The Blind Side: Evolution of a Game.

With a loan from his agent, Jimmy Sexton, Poe bought his mother a 2012 Cadillac Escalade for her birthday in January 2012. He later also bought her a house in the upscale Collierville suburb of Memphis.
