= Eachus =

Eachus is a personal name. People with that name include:

- Nate Eachus (born 1990), American football player
- Todd A. Eachus (born 1962), U.S. politician in Pennsylvania
- Robert E. Doan (Robert Eachus Doan, 1831–1919), U.S. Representative from Ohio
- Vernon Dow Eachus (Known as "Mike" Eachus, born 1900 Parsons Kansas) Road Construction owner Las Vegas NV
- Ruth Eachus Mills (born 1939) Daughter of Vernon Dow Eachus
