= Tyrell Adams =

American football player (born 1992)

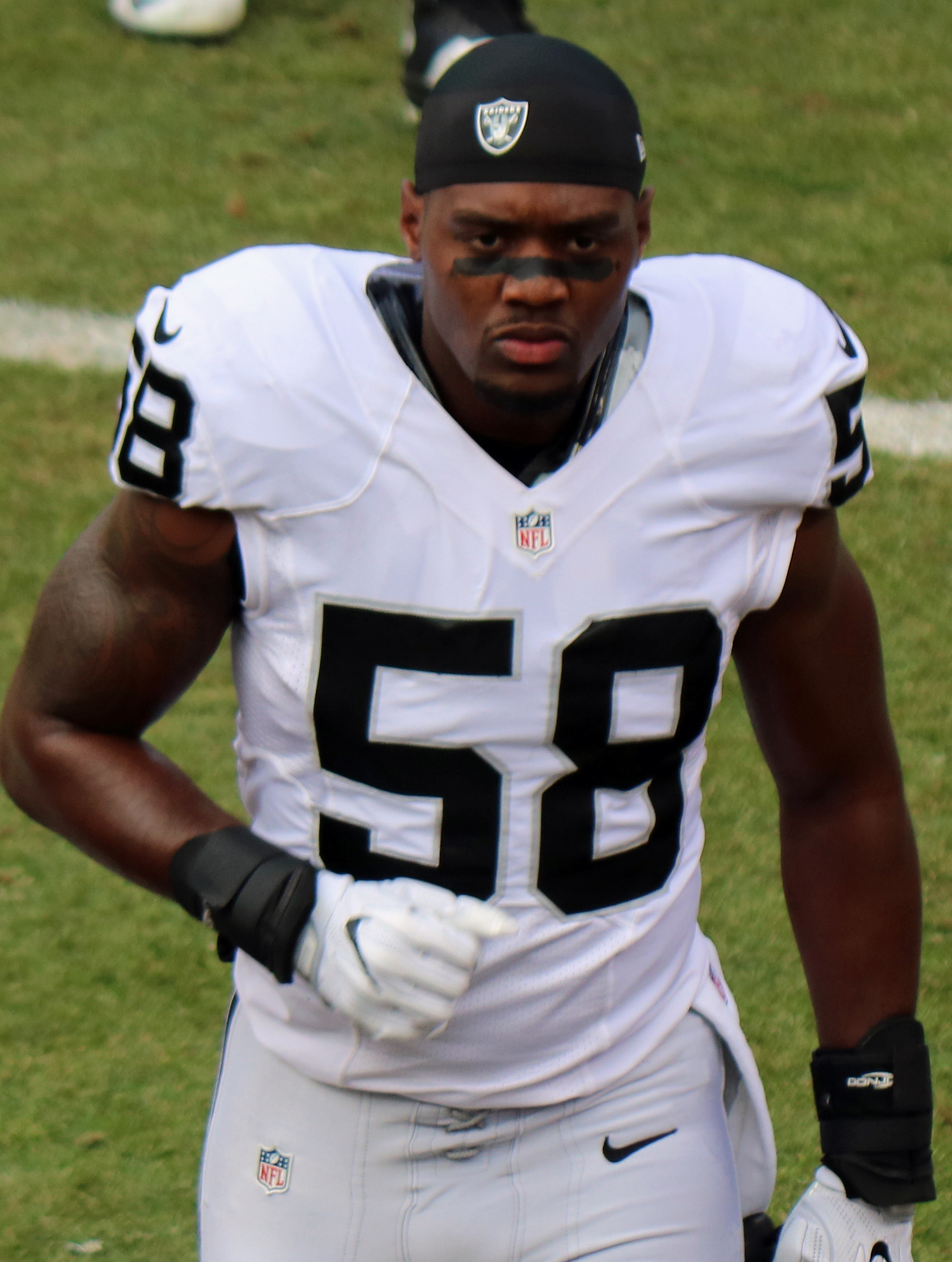
- Adams with the Oakland Raiders in the 2016

No. 58, 50, 59, 53
- Position: Linebacker

Personal information
- Born: April 11, 1992 (age 34); Atlanta, Georgia, U.S.
- Listed height: 6 ft 2 in (1.88 m)
- Listed weight: 228 lb (103 kg)

Career information
- High school: Mays (Atlanta)
- College: West Georgia
- NFL draft: 2015: undrafted

Career history
- Seattle Seahawks (2015)*; Kansas City Chiefs (2015)*; Seattle Seahawks (2015)*; Kansas City Chiefs (2015–2016)*; Oakland Raiders (2016–2017); Buffalo Bills (2017); Indianapolis Colts (2018); Houston Texans (2018); San Francisco 49ers (2018)*; Houston Texans (2018–2020); Buffalo Bills (2021)*; San Francisco 49ers (2021); Jacksonville Jaguars (2021); Indianapolis Colts (2022)*; Seattle Sea Dragons (2023); BC Lions (2024)*
- * Offseason or practice squad member only

Awards and highlights
- First-team All-Gulf South Conference (2012, 2013, 2014); All-American (2013, 2014)

Career NFL statistics
- Total tackles: 163
- Sacks: 2.0
- Forced fumbles: 4
- Fumble recoveries: 1
- Stats at Pro Football Reference

Tyrell Adams (born April 11, 1992) is an American former professional football player who was a linebacker in the National Football League (NFL). He played college football for the West Georgia Wolves. He was a member of the Seattle Seahawks, Kansas City Chiefs, Oakland Raiders, Buffalo Bills, Indianapolis Colts, Houston Texans, San Francisco 49ers, Jacksonville Jaguars, Seattle Sea Dragons and BC Lions.

== College career ==
Adams played college football at the University of West Georgia.

== Professional career ==
Pre-draft measurables
Height	Weight	Arm length	Hand span	Wingspan	40-yard dash	10-yard split	20-yard split	20-yard shuttle	Three-cone drill	Vertical jump	Broad jump	Bench press
6 ft 1 3/4 in (1.87 m)	228 lb (103 kg)	33 1/2 in (0.85 m)	9 5/8 in (0.24 m)	6 ft 7 1/4 in (2.01 m)	4.65 s	1.54 s	2.63 s	4.38 s	7.00 s	33.0 in (0.84 m)	9 ft 6 in (2.90 m)	8 reps
All values from Pro Day

=== Seattle Seahawks (first stint) ===
Adams signed with the Seattle Seahawks on May 12, 2015, after going undrafted in the 2015 NFL draft. He spent training camp with the Seahawks, but was waived during the roster cut downs on September 5, 2015.

=== Kansas City Chiefs (first stint) ===
On September 14, 2015, Adams was signed to the Kansas City Chiefs practice squad. After spending four weeks with the Chiefs, he was released on October 13.

=== Seattle Seahawks (second stint) ===
On October 15, 2015, Adams was signed to the Seahawks practice squad, but was waived on October 29.

=== Kansas City Chiefs (second stint) ===
Just a few weeks later, Adams returned to the Chiefs practice squad on November 3, 2015. Adams finished the 2015 season on the Chiefs’ practice squad, and signed as a reserve/future contract on January 18, 2016. On September 3, 2016, he was waived by the Chiefs. The next day, he was signed to the Chiefs' practice squad, but was waived the following day.

=== Oakland Raiders ===
On October 5, 2016, Adams was signed to the Raiders' practice squad. He was promoted to the active roster on November 26, 2016. He made his NFL debut the next day playing on special teams in a 35–32 win over the Carolina Panthers.

On October 16, 2017, Adams was waived by the Raiders.

=== Buffalo Bills (first stint) ===
On October 18, 2017, Adams was claimed off waivers by the Buffalo Bills. However, he was waived the next day after failing his physical.

=== Indianapolis Colts (first stint) ===
On February 23, 2018, Adams signed with the Indianapolis Colts. He was waived/injured on September 1, 2018, and was placed on injured reserve. He was released on September 10, 2018.

=== Houston Texans (first stint) ===
On October 2, 2018, Adams was signed to the Houston Texans' practice squad. He was promoted to the active roster on October 6, 2018. He was waived/injured on October 22, 2018, and was placed on injured reserve. He was released on October 24, 2018.

=== San Francisco 49ers (first stint) ===
On November 27, 2018, Adams was signed to the San Francisco 49ers' practice squad.

=== Houston Texans (second stint) ===
On December 26, 2018, Adams was signed by the Texans off the 49ers' practice squad. The Texans waived him on August 31 during final roster cuts. On September 1, 2019, Adams was signed to the Houston Texans practice squad. Adams was promoted to the active roster on September 25, 2019.

On April 6, 2020, Adams re-signed with the Texans. In Week 6 against the Tennessee Titans, Adams led the team with eight tackles and recorded his first career sack on Ryan Tannehill during the 42–36 overtime loss. In Week 12 against the Detroit Lions, Adams led the team with 17 tackles and forced two fumbles that were recovered by the Texans during the 41–25 win.

=== Buffalo Bills (second stint) ===
Adams re-signed with the Buffalo Bills on a one-year contract on March 31, 2021. He was waived on August 24, 2021.

=== San Francisco 49ers (second stint) ===
On October 5, 2021, Adams was signed to the 49ers' practice squad. He was promoted to the active roster on October 23. He was released on November 2, and re-signed to the practice squad. He was promoted to the active roster on December 4. He was waived on December 21 and re-signed to the practice squad.

=== Jacksonville Jaguars ===
On December 29, 2021, Adams was signed by the Jacksonville Jaguars off the 49ers practice squad.

On March 9, 2022, the Jaguars signed Adams to a contract extension. He was released on August 29, 2022.

=== Indianapolis Colts (second stint) ===
On November 15, 2022, Adams was signed to the Colts' practice squad. He was released on November 22.

=== Seattle Sea Dragons ===
Adams was signed to the Seattle Sea Dragons of the XFL on March 28, 2023. The Sea Dragons folded when the XFL and USFL merged to create the United Football League (UFL).

=== BC Lions ===
On February 2, 2024, Adams signed with the BC Lions of the Canadian Football League (CFL). He announced his retirement on February 28, 2024.
