= Deveron Carr =

American football player (born 1990)

No. 33
- Position: Cornerback

Personal information
- Born: August 10, 1990 (age 36); Scottsdale, Arizona, U.S.
- Listed height: 5 ft 11 in (1.80 m)
- Listed weight: 190 lb (86 kg)

Career information
- High school: Chaparral (Scottsdale)
- College: Arizona State
- NFL draft: 2013: undrafted

Career history
- Tampa Bay Buccaneers (2013); Indianapolis Colts (2015)*; Washington Redskins (2015)*; Kansas City Chiefs (2016)*
- * Offseason or practice squad member only
- Stats at Pro Football Reference

Deveron Carr (born August 10, 1990) is an American former professional football player who was a cornerback in the National Football League (NFL). He played college football for the Arizona State Sun Devils, and signed with the Tampa Bay Buccaneers in 2013 as an undrafted free agent. Carr was also a member of the Indianapolis Colts, Washington Redskins, and Kansas City Chiefs.

== College career ==
Carr played college football at the Arizona State University.

== Professional career ==
=== Tampa Bay Buccaneers ===
On April 29, 2013, Carr was signed as an undrafted free agent by the Tampa Bay Buccaneers. He played in 9 games on special teams for the Buccaneers before being waived on August 26, 2014.

=== Indianapolis Colts ===
On March 23, 2015, Carr was signed by the Indianapolis Colts following the inaugural NFL Veteran Combine.

=== Washington Redskins ===
On October 12, 2015, Carr signed with the practice squad of the Washington Redskins. On November 23, 2015, he was released.

=== Kansas City Chiefs ===
On January 14, 2016, Carr signed a futures contract with the Kansas City Chiefs. On September 3, 2016, he was released by the Chiefs.
