= C. J. Anderson =

American football player and coach (born 1991)

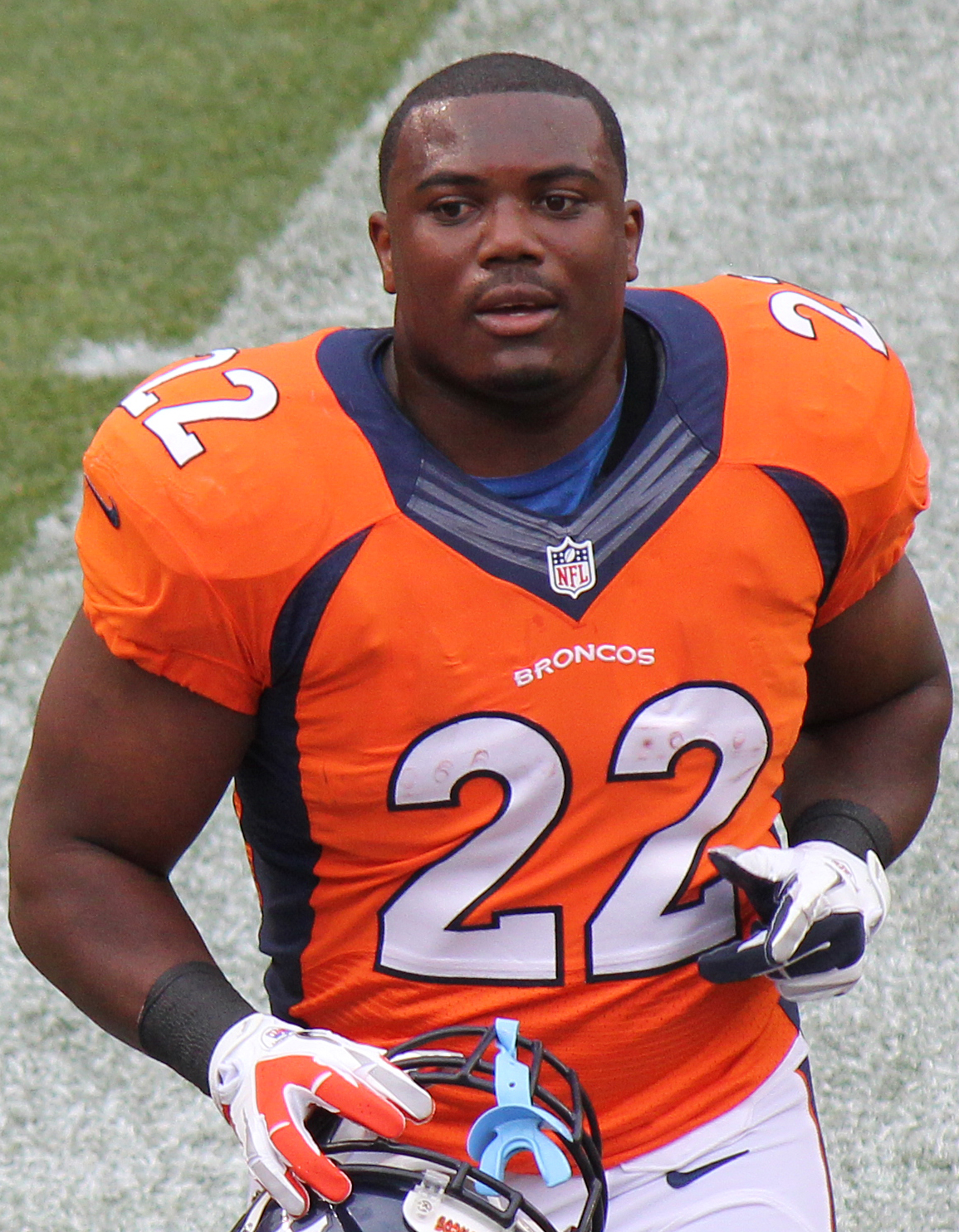
- Anderson with the Denver Broncos in 2014

No. 22, 20, 35, 26
- Position: Running back

Personal information
- Born: February 10, 1991 (age 35); Berkeley, California, U.S.
- Listed height: 5 ft 8 in (1.73 m)
- Listed weight: 225 lb (102 kg)

Career information
- High school: Jesse M. Bethel (Vallejo, California)
- College: Laney (2009–2010); California (2011–2012)
- NFL draft: 2013: undrafted

Career history

Playing
- Denver Broncos (2013–2017); Carolina Panthers (2018); Oakland Raiders (2018); Los Angeles Rams (2018); Detroit Lions (2019)

Coaching
- California (2020) Volunteer assistant; Danville (CA) Monte Vista HS (2021) Head coach; Rice (2022) Running backs coach

Awards and highlights
- Super Bowl champion (50); Pro Bowl (2014)

Career NFL statistics
- Rushing yards: 3,497
- Rushing average: 4.5
- Rushing touchdowns: 22
- Receptions: 108
- Receiving yards: 900
- Receiving touchdowns: 5
- Stats at Pro Football Reference

Cortrelle Javon Anderson (born February 10, 1991) is an American football coach and former running back who played in the National Football League (NFL) for seven seasons, primarily with the Denver Broncos. After playing college football for the California Golden Bears, he was signed by the Broncos as an undrafted free agent in 2013, where he made one Pro Bowl selection and was part of the team that won a Super Bowl title in Super Bowl 50. Anderson also played in Super Bowl LIII with the Los Angeles Rams. Following his NFL retirement, he rejoined California's football team as a volunteer assistant in 2020 before accepting a head coaching position at Monte Vista High School in Danville in 2021.

== Early life ==
Anderson attended Jesse M. Bethel High School in Vallejo, California, where he played high school football for the Jaguars. He rushed for nearly 4,000 yards during his high school career as he led his team to four consecutive playoff appearances, including a spot in the Sac-Joaquin Section title game as a junior in 2007, when he was named the Vallejo Times-Herald Athlete of the Year. He was a two-time Vallejo Times Herald MVP and first-team selection, while also picking up first-team All-Solano County Athletic Conference honors in both his junior and senior campaigns. He posted 1,297 rushing yards and 20 touchdowns on the ground and completed 44-of-91 passes for 785 yards and 11 scores as a junior. As a senior, he moved to running back after playing quarterback in an option offensive during his junior campaign and rushed for 1,623 yards and 23 touchdowns on the ground, while also contributing with 2 interceptions on defense. He became the first Bethel player to sign with and play for a Pac-12 school. Anderson also participated in track, posting bests of 12.11 seconds in the 100-meter dash and 24.35 seconds in the 200-meter dash.

== College career ==
=== Laney College ===
Anderson was selected to the first-team All-American, All-State, and All-NorCal Conference teams while at Laney College in Oakland, California.

=== California ===
Anderson went on to play at the University of California, Berkeley, after his time at Laney College. He shared the Golden Bears backfield with Isi Sofele in the 2011 season. As a junior, Anderson had 72 carries for 345 yards and eight rushing touchdowns to go along with seven receptions for 186 receiving yards and one receiving touchdown. As a senior, Anderson continued to share the backfield with Sofele and also shared carries with Brenden Bigelow. He produced 126 carries for 790 rushing yards and four rushing touchdowns to go along with plus 15 receptions for 164 receiving yards and a receiving touchdown.

== Professional career ==
Pre-draft measurables
Height	Weight	Arm length	Hand span	40-yard dash	10-yard split	20-yard split	20-yard shuttle	Three-cone drill	Vertical jump	Broad jump	Bench press
5 ft 8 1/8 in (1.73 m)	224 lb (102 kg)	30 in (0.76 m)	9 in (0.23 m)	4.60 s	1.57 s	2.67 s	4.12 s	7.15 s	32.0 in (0.81 m)	9 ft 11 in (3.02 m)	17 reps
All values from NFL Combine

=== Denver Broncos ===
==== 2013 season ====
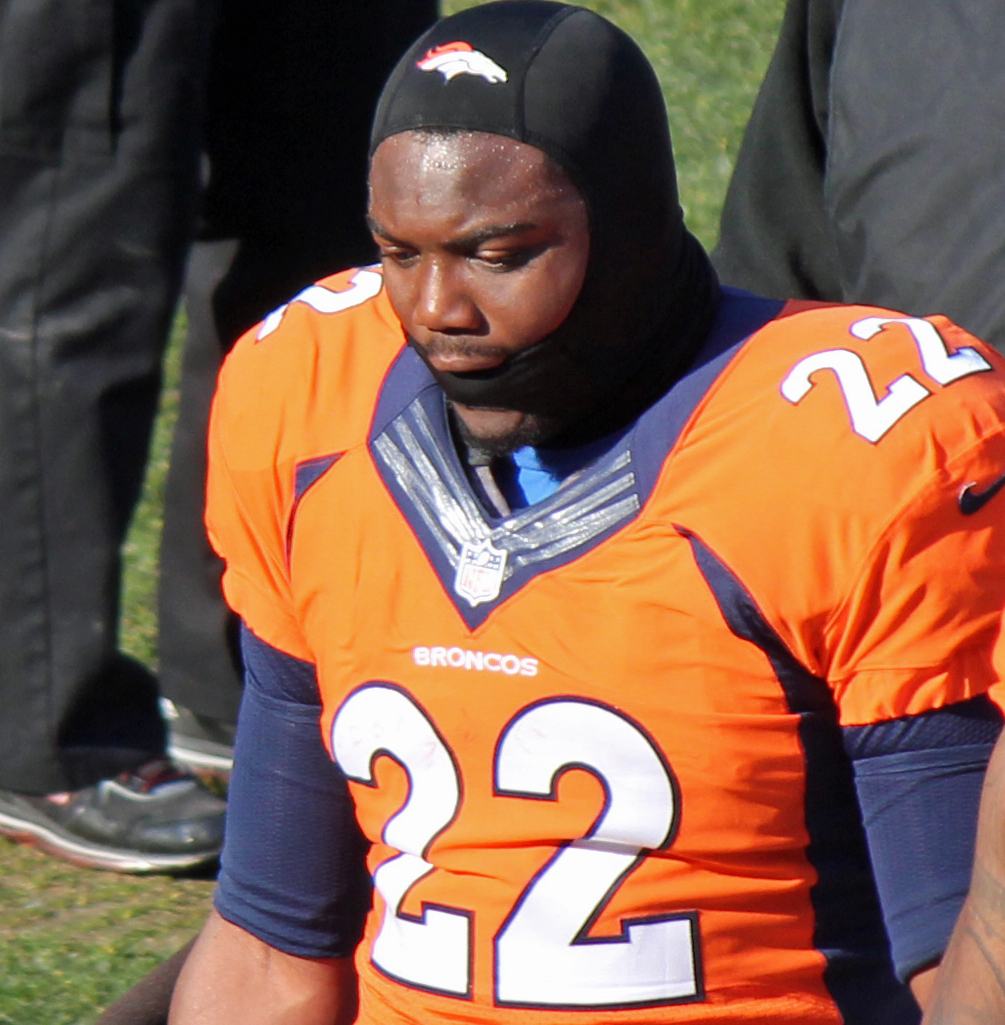
Anderson with the Broncos in 2013

Anderson signed with the Denver Broncos as an undrafted free agent on March 17, 2013. Anderson suffered a MCL injury during practice before the 2013 season started. Anderson fought to make the roster with a running back unit that contained Knowshon Moreno, Montee Ball, and Ronnie Hillman. Anderson made his NFL debut on October 27, 2013, running for 22 yards on four carries against the Washington Redskins in the 45–21 victory. Overall, he appeared in five games as a rookie and recorded seven carries for 38 yards. The Broncos reached Super Bowl XLVIII in Anderson's rookie season but lost 43–8 to the Seattle Seahawks. Anderson had a reception for 14 yards and two carries for nine yards as he got the ball for the last three plays of the game.

==== 2014 season ====
With the departure of Knowshon Moreno to the Miami Dolphins in the offseason, the Broncos backfield provided Anderson with a greater opportunity than the previous season. However, Montee Ball received a majority of the carries early on in the season. In Week 4, against the Arizona Cardinals, Ball suffered a significant groin injury. With his role expanding, on November 9, 2014, Anderson scored his first career touchdown, on a 51-yard screen pass from Peyton Manning in a 41–17 rout of the Oakland Raiders. Anderson also ran for 90 yards on 13 carries. On November 23, 2014, Anderson ran for 167 yards on 27 carries and a touchdown against the Miami Dolphins. Anderson's performance was his first game of his career with over 100 rushing yards. On November 30, 2014, Anderson ran for a season-high 168 yards and a receiving touchdown against the Kansas City Chiefs. Anderson ran for over 150 yards each time, the first Denver Broncos running back to do so since Reuben Droughns in 2004. On December 7, 2014, Anderson scored three touchdowns against the Buffalo Bills. This was Anderson's first multi-touchdown game of his career. On December 22, 2014, Anderson ran for 83 yards and a touchdown against the Cincinnati Bengals. Against the Bengals, he ran for his fifth touchdown of the season. On December 28, 2014, Anderson ran for another three touchdowns against the Oakland Raiders, bringing his total touchdown total to 10. Overall, in the 2014 season, he finished with 849 rushing yards, eight rushing touchdowns, 324 receiving yards, and three receiving touchdowns. On January 11, 2015, Anderson ran for 80 yards on 18 carries against the Indianapolis Colts in the Divisional Round of the playoffs. The Broncos lost by a score of 13–24. Anderson was ultimately named to his first Pro Bowl at the end of the season in place of the injured Le'Veon Bell. He played for Team Irvin in the 2015 Pro Bowl.

==== 2015 season ====
Going into the 2015 season, Anderson and Ronnie Hillman were the main running backs for the Broncos. Anderson started off the 2015 season slow without breaking 50 rushing yards in a single game through Week 6. On November 1, 2015, Anderson ran for 101 yards on 14 carries and a touchdown in a 29–10 victory over the Green Bay Packers. On December 2, 2015, after a 30–24 win against the New England Patriots in Week 12, Anderson was named the AFC Offensive Player of the Week. Anderson compiled 113 rushing yards and two touchdowns, including the game-winning 48-yard score in overtime. The Broncos finished the season 12–4 and earned the #1-seed in the AFC with Anderson compiling 720 rushing yards and five touchdowns. On January 17, 2016, Anderson had 15 carries for 72 yards and the game-winning touchdown in the first playoff game, the Divisional Round against the Pittsburgh Steelers. The Broncos won 23–16. In the AFC Championship against the New England Patriots, Anderson had 16 carries for 72 yards. The Broncos won 20–18 to advance to the Super Bowl. On February 7, 2016, Anderson was a key contributor in the Broncos' 24–10 victory over the Carolina Panthers in Super Bowl 50. In the game, Anderson totaled 100 yards of offense on 27 touches (23 carries and four receptions), one of his carries being a two-yard touchdown run with just over three minutes left, expanding the Broncos' lead to twelve points.

==== 2016 season ====
After the 2015 season, Anderson became a restricted free agent and signed a four-year, $18 million offer sheet with the Miami Dolphins on March 10, 2016. However, on March 15, 2016, the Broncos matched the Dolphins' offer.

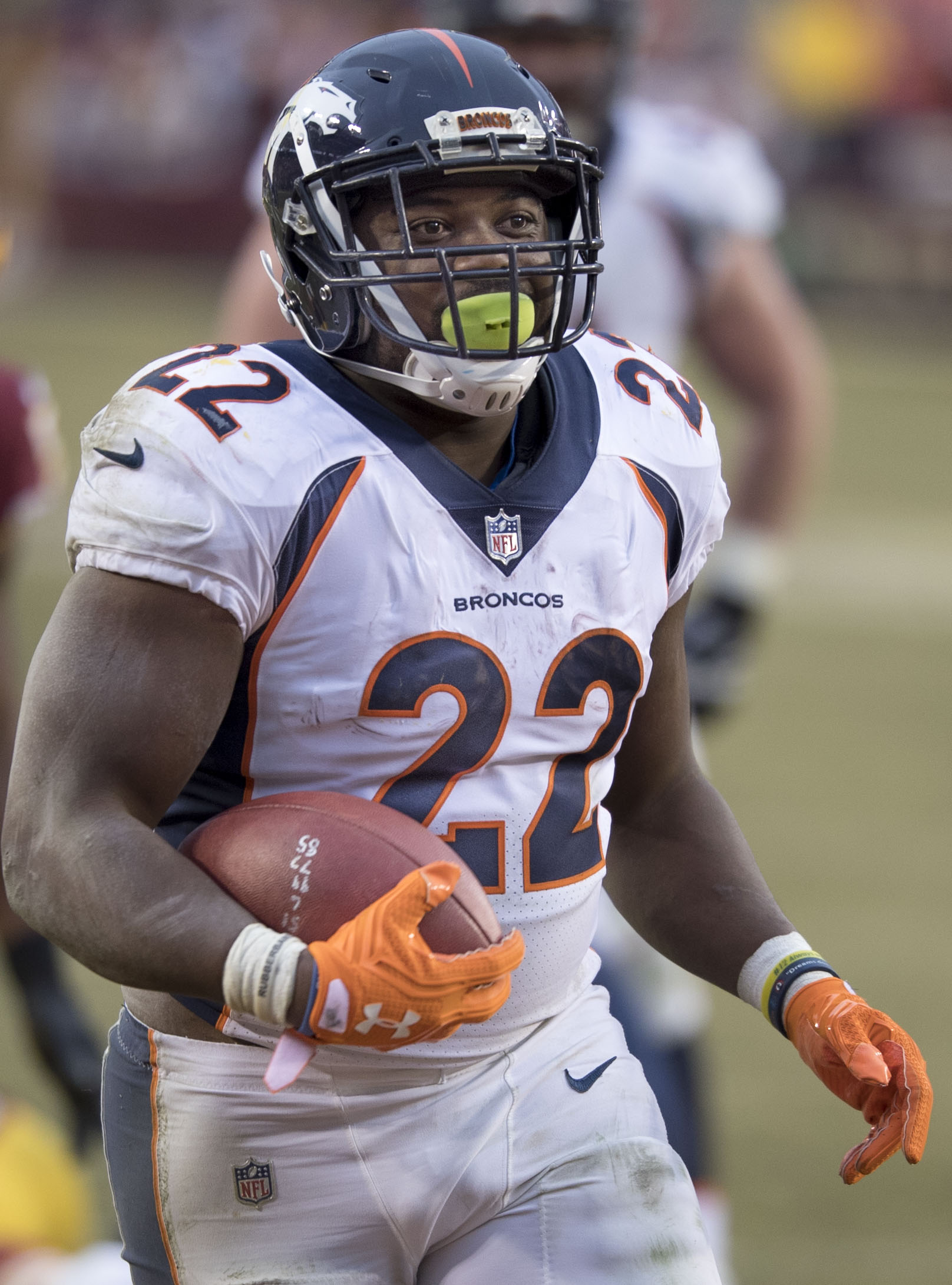
Anderson in 2017

In the offseason, the Broncos drafted Devontae Booker to compete in the backfield. On September 8, 2016, Anderson ran for 92 yards on 20 carries and two touchdowns (1 rushing, 1 receiving) in the season opening Super Bowl 50 rematch against the Carolina Panthers. On October 24, 2016, Anderson injured his knee early in the Week 7 game against the Houston Texans but continued to play in the game. Anderson ran for 107 yards on 16 carries and a touchdown. He reported soreness to the team doctors on Tuesday and underwent surgery to repair his meniscus that week. He had 110 carries for 437 yards and four touchdowns along with 16 receptions for 128 yards and a touchdown. He was placed on injured reserve on October 29, 2016, and underwent successful surgery.

==== 2017 season ====
In the 2017 season, Anderson emerged as the Broncos' main rushing weapon. He ended up being one of the few bright spots for the team in a dismal season. On September 17, 2017, in Week 2, Anderson ran for 118 yards and a touchdown on 25 carries as well as recording three catches for 36 yards and a touchdown against the Dallas Cowboys. He was the first running back to break 100 yards against the Cowboys since Alfred Morris did so for the Washington Redskins in 2015. In Week 15, against the Indianapolis Colts, he finished with 158 rushing yards. On December 31, in Week 17, he rushed for 61 yards on 18 carries against the Kansas City Chiefs, bringing his season yardage total to 1,007 yards. It was his first and only 1,000-yard season.

On April 16, 2018, Anderson was released by the Broncos after five seasons.

=== Carolina Panthers ===
On May 7, 2018, Anderson signed a one-year contract with the Carolina Panthers. He joined a backfield already dominated by Christian McCaffrey. He made his Panthers' debut in their season-opening 16–8 victory over the Dallas Cowboys. He had seven carries for 35 yards in the win. In Week 3, he scored his first touchdown as a Panther on a 24-yard reception against the Cincinnati Bengals. On November 12, 2018, Anderson was released by the Panthers.

=== Oakland Raiders ===
On December 5, 2018, Anderson was signed by the Oakland Raiders. On December 11, 2018, he was waived by the Raiders without seeing any game action.

=== Los Angeles Rams ===
On December 18, 2018, Anderson was signed by the Los Angeles Rams.

With Todd Gurley inactive, Anderson had a stellar game in Week 16 against the Arizona Cardinals, rushing for 167 yards and a touchdown as the Rams won 31–9. He followed this with 132 rushing yards, 22 receiving yards, and a rushing touchdown in a 48–32 win against the San Francisco 49ers. Anderson finished the 2018 season playing 11 games (nine with the Panthers, two with the Rams), recording 403 yards and two rushing touchdowns on 67 carries, and five catches for 41 yards and a receiving touchdown. In the NFC Divisional Round, Anderson ran 23 times for 123 yards and scored two touchdowns to lead the Rams to a 30–22 victory against the Dallas Cowboys. In the NFC Championship Game against the New Orleans Saints, Anderson led the team in rushing with 16 carries for 44 yards and caught a five-yard pass in a 26–23 overtime victory to advance to Super Bowl LIII. In the Super Bowl, Anderson had seven carries for 22 rushing yards and two receptions for 12 receiving yards, but the Rams lost 3–13 to the New England Patriots.

=== Detroit Lions ===
On April 1, 2019, Anderson signed with the Detroit Lions. On September 17, 2019, he was released by the Lions after two games, during which he recorded 16 carries for 43 rushing yards.

Anderson announced his retirement from professional football on September 18, 2020.

== Career statistics ==
=== NFL ===
Legend
	Won the Super Bowl
**Bold**	Career high

==== Regular season ====
Year	Team	Games		Rushing					Receiving					Fumbles	
Year	Team	GP	GS	Att	Yds	Avg	TD	Lng	Rec	Yds	Avg	TD	Lng	Fum	Lost
2013	DEN	5	0	7	38	5.4	0	11	—	—	—	—	—	0	0
2014	DEN	15	7	179	849	4.7	**8**	27	**34**	**324**	9.5	**2**	**51T**	1	0
2015	DEN	15	6	152	720	4.7	5	**48T**	25	183	7.3	0	27	**2**	**2**
2016	DEN	7	7	110	437	4.0	4	28	16	128	8.0	1	25T	0	0
2017	DEN	**16**	**16**	**245**	**1,007**	4.1	3	40	28	224	8.0	1	25	1	1
2018	CAR	9	1	24	104	4.3	0	22	1	24	**24.0**	1	24T	0	0
2018	LAR	2	2	43	299	**7.0**	2	46	4	17	4.3	0	13	0	0
2019	DET	2	0	16	43	2.7	0	9	—	—	—	—	—	0	0
Career		71	39	776	3,497	4.5	22	48T	108	900	8.3	5	51T	4	3

==== Postseason ====
Year	Team	Games		Rushing					Receiving					Fumbles	
Year	Team	GP	GS	Att	Yds	Avg	TD	Lng	Rec	Yds	Avg	TD	Lng	Fum	Lost
2013	DEN	1	0	2	9	**4.5**	0	6	1	14	**14.0**	0	14	0	0
2014	DEN	1	**1**	18	80	4.4	0	22	6	29	4.8	0	**15**	0	0
2015	DEN	**3**	**1**	**54**	**234**	4.3	**2**	**34**	**9**	**39**	4.3	0	8	0	0
2018	LAR	**3**	0	46	189	4.1	**2**	15	3	17	5.7	0	9	**1**	0
Career		8	2	120	512	4.3	4	34	19	99	5.2	0	15	1	0

=== College ===
Year	School	Conf	Class	Pos	G	Rushing				Receiving			
Year	School	Conf	Class	Pos	G	**Att**	**Yds**	**Avg**	**TD**	**Rec**	**Yds**	**Avg**	**TD**
2011	California	Pac-12	JR	RB	13	72	345	4.8	8	7	186	26.6	1
2012	California	Pac-12	SR	RB	12	126	790	6.3	4	15	164	10.9	1
**Career**	**California**				**25**	**198**	**1,135**	**5.7**	**12**	**22**	**350**	**15.9**	**2**

== Coaching career ==
Following his retirement, Anderson joined the coaching staff at his alma mater Cal as a volunteer coach. In 2021 he was hired as the head varsity football coach at Monte Vista High School in Danville, California. After spending one season as the head coach at Monte Vista High School, Anderson was hired as the running backs coach at Rice. Anderson was not retained following the Owls' 2022 season. Anderson is currently the head coach of the Benicia High School Panthers located in Benicia, California

== Personal life ==
Anderson is a longtime fan of the Sonic the Hedgehog video game series.

Anderson also streams on twitch.tv. Any subscriptions and donations are donated to his charity, The Dreams Never Die Foundation, whose focus is to provide inner city & low income youth with the resources needed to persevere and ultimately reach their maximum potential in academics and/or athletics.

Anderson likes to play Apex Legends in his Twitch stream.
