= Michael Friedman =

Michael or Mike Friedman may refer to:

- Mike Friedman (American football) (died 2026), American football coach
- Michael Friedman (philosopher) (1947–2025), American philosopher of science
- Michael Jan Friedman (born 1955), American author
- Michael Friedman (author, born 1960) (1960–2020), American author, poet, editor and publisher
- Michael Friedman (composer) (1975–2017), American composer and lyricist
- Mike Friedman (cyclist) (born 1982), American cyclist
- Michael Friedman, president of Purdue Pharma
- Michael Friedman (photographer) (born 1943), music publicist and producer, and artist manager

== See also ==
- Michael Freedman (disambiguation)
- Michael Freeman (disambiguation)
