= 2015–16 NFL playoffs =

American football tournament

- Dates: January 9 – February 7, 2016
- Season: 2015
- Teams: 12
- Games played: 11
- Super Bowl 50 site: Levi's Stadium; Santa Clara, California
- Defending champions: New England Patriots
- Champion: Denver Broncos (3rd title)
- Runner-up: Carolina Panthers
- Conference runners-up: Arizona Cardinals; New England Patriots
NFL playoffs
← 2014–15	2016–17 →

The National Football League playoffs for the 2015 season began on January 9, 2016. The postseason tournament concluded with Super Bowl 50, on February 7, when the Denver Broncos defeated the Carolina Panthers at Levi's Stadium in Santa Clara, California.

For this year only, the Super Bowl decided not to use a Roman numeral ("L") and instead used the standard numerals "50." According to Jaime Weston, the league's vice president of brand and creative, the primary reason was that the league's graphic designers had difficulty designing a suitable, aesthetically pleasing logo with only the Roman numeral "L".

== Participants ==
Within each conference, the four division winners and the top two non-division winners with the best overall regular season records) qualified for the playoffs. The four division winners are seeded 1–4 based on their overall won-lost-tied record, and the wild card teams are seeded 5–6. The NFL does not use a fixed bracket playoff system, and there are no restrictions regarding teams from the same division matching up in any round. In the first round, dubbed the wild-card playoffs or wild-card weekend, the third-seeded division winner hosts the sixth-seed wild card, and the fourth seed hosts the fifth. The 1 and 2 seeds from each conference received a first-round bye. In the second round, the divisional playoffs, the number 1 seed hosts the worst-surviving seed from the first round (seed 4, 5, or 6), while the number 2 seed will play the other team (seed 3, 4, or 5). The two surviving teams from each conference's divisional playoff games met in the respective AFC and NFC Conference Championship games, hosted by the higher seed. Although the Super Bowl, the championship round of the playoffs, is played at a neutral site, the designated home team is based on an annual rotation by conference.

Playoff seeds
Seed	AFC	NFC
1	Denver Broncos (West winner)	Carolina Panthers (South winner)
2	New England Patriots (East winner)	Arizona Cardinals (West winner)
3	Cincinnati Bengals (North winner)	Minnesota Vikings (North winner)
4	Houston Texans (South winner)	Washington Redskins (East winner)
5	Kansas City Chiefs (wild card)	Green Bay Packers (wild card)
6	Pittsburgh Steelers (wild card)	Seattle Seahawks (wild card)

== Bracket ==
Jan 10 – FedExField	Jan 16 – University of Phoenix Stadium
5	Green Bay	35
5	Green Bay	20
4	Washington	18	Jan 24 – Bank of America Stadium
2	Arizona	26*
NFC
Jan 10 – TCF Bank Stadium	2	Arizona	15
Jan 17 – Bank of America Stadium
1	Carolina	49
6	Seattle	10	NFC Championship
6	Seattle	24
3	Minnesota	9	Feb 7 – Levi's Stadium
1	Carolina	31
Wild-card round
Divisional round
Jan 9 – NRG Stadium	N1	Carolina	10
Jan 16 – Gillette Stadium
A1	Denver	24
5	Kansas City	30	Super Bowl 50
5	Kansas City	20
4	Houston	0	Jan 24 – Sports Authority Field at Mile High
2	New England	27
AFC
Jan 9 – Paul Brown Stadium	2	New England	18
Jan 17 – Sports Authority Field at Mile High
1	Denver	20
6	Pittsburgh	18	AFC Championship
6	Pittsburgh	16
3	Cincinnati	16
1	Denver	23

* Indicates overtime victory

== Schedule ==
In a change from previous seasons, both AFC wild card games were played on the Saturday, and then both NFC Wild Card games were played on the Sunday (instead of having a game from each conference on the same day).

Round	Away team	Score	Home team	Date	Kickoff (ET / UTC-5)	TV	Viewers (millions)	TV Rating
Wild-card round	Kansas City Chiefs	30–0	Houston Texans	January 9, 2016	4:35 p.m.	ABC/ESPN	25.1	16.2
Wild-card round	Pittsburgh Steelers	18–16	Cincinnati Bengals	January 9, 2016	8:15 p.m.	CBS	31.2	19.2
Wild-card round	Seattle Seahawks	10–9	Minnesota Vikings	January 10, 2016	1:05 p.m.	NBC	35.3	22.5
Wild-card round	Green Bay Packers	35–18	Washington Redskins	January 10, 2016	4:40 p.m.	Fox	38.8	23.6
Divisional round	Kansas City Chiefs	20–27	New England Patriots	January 16, 2016	4:35 p.m.	CBS	31.5	19.7
Divisional round	Green Bay Packers	20–26 (OT)	Arizona Cardinals	January 16, 2016	8:15 p.m.	NBC	33.7	20.3
Divisional round	Seattle Seahawks	24–31	Carolina Panthers	January 17, 2016	1:05 p.m.	Fox	36.7	23.1
Divisional round	Pittsburgh Steelers	16–23	Denver Broncos	January 17, 2016	4:40 p.m.	CBS	43.0	26.2
Conference championships	New England Patriots	18–20	Denver Broncos	January 24, 2016	3:05 p.m.	CBS	53.3	31.7
Conference championships	Arizona Cardinals	15–49	Carolina Panthers	January 24, 2016	6:40 p.m.	Fox	45.7	26.8
Super Bowl 50 Levi's Stadium Santa Clara, California	Carolina Panthers	10–24	Denver Broncos	February 7, 2016	6:30 p.m.	CBS	111.9	46.6

== Wild-card round ==
For the first time since the wild card round expanded to four games in 1990–91, all four playoff games on wild card weekend were won by the visiting teams. It also marked the first time in that all of the wild card teams advanced past the first round of the playoffs (this was only possible from 1970–71 until 1977–78 and since 2002–03, because playoff formats between 1978–79 and 2001–02 included first-round games between two wild card teams due to there being 3 divisions in each conference at the time).

=== Saturday, January 9, 2016 ===
==== AFC: Kansas City Chiefs 30, Houston Texans 0 ====
Kansas City Chiefs vs. Houston Texans – Game summary

Quarter	1	2	3	4	Total
Chiefs	7	6	7	10	30
Texans	0	0	0	0	0

at NRG Stadium in Houston, Texas

- Date: January 9
- Game time: 4:35 PM EST/3:35 PM CST
- Game weather: 54 °F (12 °C), sunny (played indoors – retractable roof closed)
- Game attendance: 71,800
- Referee: Ron Torbert
- TV announcers (ABC/ESPN): Mike Tirico, Jon Gruden, and Lisa Salters
- Recap, Gamebook

Game information

1st quarter

- KC – Knile Davis 106-yard kickoff return (Cairo Santos kick), 14:49. Chiefs 7–0.

2nd quarter

- KC – Cairo Santos 49-yard field goal, 12:50. Chiefs 10–0. Drive: 5 plays, 27 yards, 2:30.
- KC – Cairo Santos 49-yard field goal, 7:06. Chiefs 13–0. Drive: 6 plays, 40 yards, 3:29.

3rd quarter

- KC – Chris Conley 9-yard pass from Alex Smith (Cairo Santos kick), 4:35. Chiefs 20–0. Drive: 11 plays, 94 yards, 5:23.

4th quarter

- KC – Spencer Ware 5-yard run (Cairo Santos kick), 14:56. Chiefs 27–0. Drive: 8 plays, 71 yards, 4:13.
- KC – Cairo Santos 33-yard field goal, 3:59. Chiefs 30–0. Drive: 4 plays, 6 yards, 2:13.

Top passers

- KC – Alex Smith – 17/22, 190 yards, TD, INT
- HOU – Brian Hoyer – 15/34, 136 yards, 4 INT

Top rushers

- KC – Spencer Ware – 16 rushes, 67 yards, TD
- HOU – Alfred Blue – 17 rushes, 99 yards

Top receivers

- KC – Travis Kelce – 8 receptions, 128 yards
- HOU – DeAndre Hopkins – 6 receptions, 69 yards

Kansas City, who started the season 1–5 before winning their next 10 games, forced five turnovers and held the Texans to 226 total yards as they earned their first postseason win since the 1993 season (a game also played at Houston, against the Oilers), and the first shutout victory in an NFL playoff game in 10 years. It is the first (and to date only) time the Texans have been shut out at home.

Chiefs running back Knile Davis gave his team a 7–0 lead just 11 seconds into the game by returning the opening kickoff 106 yards for a touchdown, making him the first player to score a touchdown on the first kickoff of an NFL postseason. The two teams went on to exchange punts, and then interceptions, as Texans quarterback Brian Hoyer was picked off by Eric Berry and Alex Smith returned the favor with a pass that bounced out of the hands of Jeremy Maclin and was intercepted by linebacker Brian Cushing.

Houston then drove to the Chiefs' 30-yard line, but on 3rd-and-7, Hoyer lost a fumble while being sacked by Allen Bailey, and defensive tackle Dontari Poe recovered it on the Chiefs' 42-yard line. Kansas City subsequently drove 27 yards, including an 18-yard catch by tight end Travis Kelce, to go up 10–0 on a 49-yard Cairo Santos field goal. On the Chiefs' next possession, Kelce caught a 25-yard pass on a 40-yard drive that ended on another 49-yard field goal by Santos, making the score 13–0. Houston took the ball back and drove to the Kansas City 3-yard line, but linebacker Josh Mauga's interception kept them off the scoreboard going into halftime.

Houston started the second half with a drive to the Chiefs' 40-yard line, but ended up punting. Shane Lechler managed to pin Kansas City back on their own 6-yard line with a 34-yard punt. But despite two holding penalties against the Chiefs, one of which nullified a 64-yard scramble by Smith, they still drove 94 yards in 11 plays for their first touchdown. Maclin was a key part of the drive, catching two passes for 23 yards, though on the second one he suffered a game-ending injury; Smith also completed a 16-yard pass to Kelce and finished the drive with a 9-yard touchdown pass to rookie receiver Chris Conley, give the Chiefs a 20–0 lead.

On their next drive, the Texans had to punt after three plays, and then saw Kansas City drive 71 yards in eight plays, featuring a 48-yard reception by Kelce, to score on 5-yard touchdown run by Spencer Ware. Houston managed to respond with a drive to the Chiefs' 24-yard line, only to lose the ball when Bailey again forced a fumble while sacking Hoyer on fourth down. The Texans' defense forced a punt, but Dustin Colquitt's 56-yard kick pinned them back on their 8-yard line. On the next play, Hoyer was intercepted by Sean Smith on the 20-yard line, leading to Santos' third field goal to make the final score 30–0.

Smith completed 17 of 22 passes for 190 yards with a touchdown and an interception. His top target was Kelce, who caught eight passes for 128 yards, while Ware was the top rusher for the Chiefs with 67 yards and a touchdown. Bailey had four tackles, two sacks, and two forced fumbles. Hoyer was held to just 15 of 34 passes for 134 yards and was intercepted four times. Alfred Blue was the game's leading rusher with 99 yards on 17 carries. Cushing had 13 tackles and an interception, while linebacker Whitney Mercilus had five tackles and three sacks.

This was the first postseason meeting between the Chiefs and Texans. It was also the first NFL game to air on ABC since Super Bowl XL in 2006.

==== AFC: Pittsburgh Steelers 18, Cincinnati Bengals 16 ====
Pittsburgh Steelers vs. Cincinnati Bengals – Game summary

Quarter	1	2	3	4	Total
Steelers	0	6	9	3	18
Bengals	0	0	0	16	16

at Paul Brown Stadium, Cincinnati, Ohio

- Date: January 9
- Game time: 8:15 PM EST
- Game weather: 51 °F (11 °C), light drizzle
- Game attendance: 63,257
- Referee: John Parry
- TV announcers (CBS): Jim Nantz, Phil Simms, and Tracy Wolfson
- Recap, Gamebook

Game information

1st quarter

- None.

2nd quarter

- PIT – Chris Boswell 39-yard field goal, 2:27. Steelers 3–0. Drive: 6 plays, 20 yards, 2:30.
- PIT – Chris Boswell 30-yard field goal, 0:33. Steelers 6–0. Drive: 9 plays, 63 yards, 1:16.

3rd quarter

- PIT – Chris Boswell 34-yard field goal, 10:09. Steelers 9–0. Drive: 5 plays, 47 yards, 2:04.
- PIT – Martavis Bryant 10-yard pass from Ben Roethlisberger (pass failed), 5:02. Steelers 15–0. Drive: 6 plays, 82 yards, 3:29.

4th quarter

- CIN – Jeremy Hill 1-yard run (Mike Nugent kick), 13:57. Steelers 15–7. Drive: 3 plays, 46 yards, 0:50.
- CIN – Mike Nugent 36-yard field goal, 5:12. Steelers 15–10. Drive: 13 plays, 70 yards, 5:59.
- CIN – A. J. Green 25-yard pass from A. J. McCarron (run failed), 1:50. Bengals 16–15. Drive: 7 plays, 45 yards, 1:38.
- PIT – Chris Boswell 35-yard field goal, 0:14. Steelers 18–16. Drive: 9 plays, 74 yards, 1:09.

Top passers

- PIT – Ben Roethlisberger – 18/31, 229 yards, TD
- CIN – A. J. McCarron – 23/41, 212 yards, TD, INT

Top rushers

- PIT – Jordan Todman – 11 rushes, 65 yards
- CIN – Jeremy Hill – 12 rushes, 50 yards, TD

Top receivers

- PIT – Antonio Brown – 7 receptions, 119 yards
- CIN – A. J. Green – 5 receptions, 71 yards, TD

This game ended up being a rain-soaked vicious battle between two AFC North rivals, filled with injuries and personal fouls on both sides. After falling behind 15–0, the Bengals scored three times in the fourth quarter to take a 16–15 lead. But with less than a minute left in the game, two consecutive personal fouls against Cincinnati's defense got the Steelers close enough for Chris Boswell to make a 35-yard field goal with 18 seconds left on the clock.

The game started off as a defensive battle with both teams punting at the end of its first eight drives. With less than six minutes left in the second quarter, Bengals linebacker Vontaze Burfict forced a fumble from Markus Wheaton that safety George Iloka recovered on the Cincinnati 47-yard line. But a few plays later, Bengals quarterback A. J. McCarron threw an interception to Antwon Blake, who returned it 35 yards to the Bengals' 41-yard line. A 23-yard completion from Ben Roethlisberger to Antonio Brown on the ensuing drive set up Boswell's 39-yard field goal. Following a punt, Roethlisberger completed a 16-yard pass to running back Fitzgerald Toussaint and a 24-yard pass to Wheaton – with a personal foul penalty on safety Shawn Williams adding another 15 yards – to set up Boswell's 30-yard field goal just before halftime. Despite the Steelers' slim 6–0 lead, they had dominated the stat sheet, holding Cincinnati to just 56 yards and two first downs.

On the opening drive of the second half, the Bengals seemed primed to score when Jeremy Hill broke free for a 38-yard run to the Steelers' 29-yard line. But on the next play, McCarron lost a fumble due to a hit by linebacker Jarvis Jones. Defensive end Cam Thomas recovered the ball and ended up losing it while being tackled, then William Gay picked it up and returned it for a touchdown. However, replays showed that Thomas was down by contact before he lost the fumble, and a 15-yard penalty against Gay for excessive celebration moved the ball all the way back to Pittsburgh's 36-yard line. Receiver Martavis Bryant's 44-yard run on an end-around play then set up Boswell's 34-yard field goal that gave the Steelers a 9–0 lead. Following a punt, Roethlisberger completed a 60-yard pass to Brown on the Bengals' 10-yard line. Then he threw a pass in the back of the end zone to Bryant, who made a diving somersault catch and maintained possession for a touchdown by pinning the ball against one leg while falling to the ground. However, Pittsburgh's two-point conversion attempt failed, so the score remained 15–0. Cincinnati responded with a drive to the Steelers' 23-yard line, but committed another turnover when running back Giovani Bernard lost a fumble that was forced and recovered by linebacker Ryan Shazier, who leveled Bernard with a devastating helmet leading hit that knocked the running back out of the game and out of consciousness. Shazier was not penalized for the hit, much to the dismay of the home crowd.

On the last play of the third quarter, Burfict sacked Roethlisberger for a 12-yard loss, forcing a punt from the Steelers' 5-yard line and temporarily knocking Roethlisberger out of the game with a shoulder injury. After Jordan Berry's 41-yard punt gave the Bengals a first down on the Pittsburgh 46-yard line, Will Allen committed a 42-yard pass interference penalty while trying to cover A. J. Green. Hill then got the ball into the end zone with consecutive carries, the second a 1-yard touchdown run that made the score 15–7. The Steelers, now led by Landry Jones, started off their next drive well, as Jordan Todman rushed for a 25-yard gain on the second play. But an 11-yard sack by Carlos Dunlap and Pat Sims ultimately forced the Steelers to punt. McCarron started the Bengals' drive off with two completions to Hill for 24 total yards. Later on, he converted a 3rd-and-9 with an 18-yard completion to tight end Tyler Eifert, and eventually the Bengals got close enough for Mike Nugent to kick a 36-yard field goal, making the score 15–10 with 5:17 left. The Steelers had to punt after three plays on their ensuing possession, and Adam Jones' 24-yard return gave the Bengals the ball on the Pittsburgh 45-yard line. McCarron soon faced a 4th-and-2 situation, but converted with a 9-yard completion to Marvin Jones. Then when faced with 3rd-and-7, he launched a 25-yard touchdown pass to Green. After their two-point conversion failed, the Bengals held a 16–15 lead with 1:45 left. On the first play after the kickoff, Landry Jones threw an interception to Burfict on the Steelers' 26-yard line. He celebrated by running all the way through the tunnel. But with the game now seemingly in the Bengals' control, they gave the ball right back on the next play when Shazier forced a fumble from Hill that was recovered by Ross Cockrell.

Now with the ball on his own 11-yard line with 1:23 left, Roethlisberger returned to lead his team 74 yards in nine plays for the game-winning score. After several short completions moved the ball to the 37-yard line, Pittsburgh faced a 4th-and-3, but overcame it on Brown's 12-yard reception. On the next play, with just 22 seconds left, Roethlisberger threw a pass intended for Brown. The pass was incomplete, but Burfict was flagged for a personal foul for contact with Brown's helmet. Brown was injured on the play, and as he was being attended and officials were dealing with both teams, Adam Jones was flagged for a personal foul after an altercation with Steelers linebackers coach Joey Porter, giving the Steelers another 15 yards and moving the ball to the Bengals' 17-yard line. On the next play, Boswell kicked a 35-yard field goal with 18 seconds left to win the game.

Roethlisberger completed 18 of 31 passes for 221 yards and a touchdown, while Brown caught seven passes for 119 yards and Todman was the game's leading rusher with 65 yards. Shazier had 13 tackles – nine of which were solo tackles – a pair of forced fumbles, and a fumble recovery. McCarron completed 23 of 41 passes for 213 yards, with a touchdown and an interception. Hill rushed for 50 yards and a touchdown, while also catching three passes for 27 yards. Green caught five passes for 71 yards and a touchdown, while Burfict had six tackles, a sack, an interception, and a forced fumble.

This marked another round of playoff futility for the Bengals, who lost their fifth playoff game in a row after starting the season 8–0 and finishing with a franchise record tying 12–4 record, despite losing starting quarterback Andy Dalton to a broken thumb injury in week 14. Bengals head coach Marvin Lewis' playoff record fell to 0–7, the most losses ever by a head coach without a postseason win. After the game, Dalton stated that "This locker room should feel a lot different right now. We won that game and then we didn't".

Sportswriter Mike Freeman called this game "one of the dirtiest and ugliest contests in the modern era of the sport". Burfict received a 3-game suspension for his hit on Brown (including the Week 2 matchup between the two teams), while four players and two assistant coaches also received fines. Jones received the most severe fine at $28,000, while Steelers guard Ramon Foster was fined $17,000. Bengals defensive tackles Wallace Gilberry and Domata Peko each received an $8,600 fine, while Porter and fellow Steelers assistant coach Mike Munchak were fined $10,000 each. In the offseason, the league passed a rule banning any coaches except for the head coach from entering the field of play, and then only to check on an injured player, directly in response to the incident.

On January 16, the NFL Vice President of Officiating, Dean Blandino, stated that the Martavis Bryant catch was not an actual catch. "I don't think this is a catch, if I just had a blank slate and I could say, do you think it's a catch or not a catch? I would say no catch." said Blandino. Unfortunately, that catch for a touchdown cost the game for the Bengals.

This was the second postseason meeting between the Steelers and Bengals. Pittsburgh won the previous meeting 31–17 in the 2005 AFC Wild Card playoffs.

=== Sunday, January 10, 2016 ===
==== NFC: Seattle Seahawks 10, Minnesota Vikings 9 ====
Seattle Seahawks vs. Minnesota Vikings – Game summary

Quarter	1	2	3	4	Total
Seahawks	0	0	0	10	10
Vikings	3	0	6	0	9

at TCF Bank Stadium in Minneapolis, Minnesota

- Date: January 10
- Game time: 1:05 PM EST/12:05 PM CST
- Game weather: −6 °F (−21 °C), clear
- Game attendance: 52,090
- Referee: Walt Coleman
- TV announcers (NBC): Al Michaels, Cris Collinsworth, and Michele Tafoya
- Recap, Gamebook

Game information

1st quarter

- MIN – Blair Walsh 22-yard field goal, 1:01. Vikings 3–0. Drive: 10 plays, 25 yards, 5:52.

2nd quarter

- None.

3rd quarter

- MIN – Blair Walsh 43-yard field goal, 7:04. Vikings 6–0. Drive: 5 plays, 28 yards, 2:45.
- MIN – Blair Walsh 47-yard field goal, 0:02. Vikings 9–0. Drive: 8 plays, 19 yards, 4:39.

4th quarter

- SEA – Doug Baldwin 3-yard pass from Russell Wilson (Steven Hauschka kick), 11:37. Vikings 9–7. Drive: 7 plays, 80 yards, 3:25.
- SEA – Steven Hauschka 46-yard field goal, 8:04. Seahawks 10–9. Drive: 7 plays, 12 yards, 2:33.

Top passers

- SEA – Russell Wilson – 13/26, 142 yards, TD, INT
- MIN – Teddy Bridgewater – 17/24, 146 yards

Top rushers

- SEA – Christine Michael – 21 rushes, 70 yards
- MIN – Adrian Peterson – 23 rushes, 45 yards

Top receivers

- SEA – Doug Baldwin – 5 receptions, 42 yards, TD
- MIN – Stefon Diggs – 4 receptions, 26 yards

In their final game at TCF Bank Stadium – prior to the Vikings' move to U.S. Bank Stadium for the 2016 season – Minnesota kicker Blair Walsh missed a 27-yard field goal attempt with 22 seconds remaining as the Seahawks held on to win 10–9. The temperature at kickoff was −6 °F (−21 °C), making this the third coldest game in NFL history.

On their first possession Seattle went three-and-out, but punter Jon Ryan bobbled a low snap and was unable to get off a punt, giving Minnesota possession at the Seattle 29-yard line. The Vikings drove to the 4-yard line but had to settle for a Walsh field goal to open the scoring. After both teams punted on their next possession, Seattle drove to the Vikings' 30-yard line and faced a 4th-and-13. Rather than attempt a field goal, Russell Wilson threw a pass to Fred Jackson who was tackled short of a first down after a 7-yard gain. Neither team could score for the rest of the half, and Minnesota went to halftime leading 3–0. Both teams combined for 185 total yards in the half, the lowest in a playoff game since 2005.

On the first possession of the second half Seattle drove into Minnesota territory and again went for it on fourth down, only for Wilson to be intercepted by Trae Waynes. Minnesota was then helped by a penalty for Cliff Avril roughing the passer, and Walsh kicked a 43-yard field goal to give them a 6–0 lead. Seattle went three-and-out on their next drive, and Minnesota began their drive in Seahawks territory after a horse collar tackle on the punt return. They settled for another Walsh field goal, this time from 47-yards out, to take a 9–0 lead into the fourth quarter. With the ball on the Vikings' 39-yard line on the ensuing drive, Wilson could not handle the snap and recovered it back at his own 45-yard line, but then found Tyler Lockett for a 35-yard completion. Two plays later Wilson threw a touchdown to Doug Baldwin, cutting the deficit to 9–7. On Minnesota's second play of the next drive Kam Chancellor forced an Adrian Peterson fumble which was recovered by Ahtyba Rubin at the Vikings' 40-yard line. Steven Hauschka converted on a 46-yard field goal to put Seattle ahead 10–9 with 8:04 remaining. Both teams punted on their next two drives, and Minnesota took possession with 1:42 left on their own 39-yard line. With a 19-yard pass interference call on Chancellor and a 24-yard pass from Teddy Bridgewater to Kyle Rudolph, Minnesota advanced to the Seattle 9-yard line with 26 seconds remaining. Walsh, however, kicked the 27-yard field goal wide left, allowing Seattle to kneel out the clock and preserve the victory.

Bridgewater finished as the leading passer with 146 yards, while Wilson recorded 142 yards with a touchdown and an interception. Seattle held Peterson, the league's leading rusher during the regular season, to just 45 yards on 23 carries. The win was Wilson's seventh playoff victory, the most by a quarterback within his first four seasons. Seattle became just the fifth team to win a playoff game despite scoring ten or fewer points, and the first since 1997.

This was the first postseason meeting between the Seahawks and Vikings.

==== NFC: Green Bay Packers 35, Washington Redskins 18 ====
Green Bay Packers vs. Washington Redskins – Game summary

Quarter	1	2	3	4	Total
Packers	0	17	7	11	35
Redskins	5	6	7	0	18

at FedExField in Landover, Maryland

- Date: January 10
- Game time: 4:40 PM EST
- Game weather: 61 °F (16 °C), cloudy
- Game attendance: 81,367
- Referee: Gene Steratore
- TV announcers (Fox): Joe Buck, Troy Aikman, Erin Andrews, and Chris Myers
- Recap, Gamebook

Game information

1st quarter

- WAS – Preston Smith sacked Aaron Rodgers in end zone for safety, 10:27. Redskins 2–0.
- WAS – Dustin Hopkins 25-yard field goal, 4:51. Redskins 5–0. Drive: 10 plays, 48 yards, 5:36.

2nd quarter

- WAS – Jordan Reed 24-yard pass from Kirk Cousins (kick failed, hit right upright), 13:02. Redskins 11–0. Drive: 7 plays, 64 yards, 3:22.
- GB – Randall Cobb 12-yard pass from Aaron Rodgers (Mason Crosby kick), 9:04. Redskins 11–7. Drive: 9 plays, 80 yards, 3:58.
- GB – Mason Crosby 43-yard field goal, 2:54. Redskins 11–10. Drive: 8 plays, 30 yards, 3:11.
- GB – Davante Adams 10-yard pass from Aaron Rodgers (Mason Crosby kick), 0:28. Packers 17–11. Drive: 9 plays, 60 yards, 1:54.

3rd quarter

- WAS – Kirk Cousins 3-yard run (Dustin Hopkins kick), 9:41. Redskins 18–17. Drive: 9 plays, 73 yards, 5:19.
- GB – James Starks 4-yard run (Mason Crosby kick), 4:12. Packers 24–18. Drive: 11 plays, 80 yards, 5:29.

4th quarter

- GB – Eddie Lacy 2-yard run (Aaron Rodgers–Jared Abbrederis pass), 12:23. Packers 32–18. Drive: 10 plays, 76 yards, 5:39.
- GB – Mason Crosby 29-yard field goal, 4:39. Packers 35–18. Drive: 4 plays, 6 yards, 0:19.

Top passers

- GB – Aaron Rodgers – 21/36, 210 yards, 2 TD
- WAS – Kirk Cousins – 29/46, 329 yards, TD

Top rushers

- GB – Eddie Lacy – 12 rushes, 63 yards, TD
- WAS – Alfred Morris – 11 rushes, 50 yards

Top receivers

- GB – James Jones – 7 receptions, 81 yards
- WAS – Jordan Reed – 9 receptions, 120 yards, TD

Green Bay erased an early 11–0 deficit by scoring on five consecutive possessions on the way to a 35–18 victory over the Redskins.

Early in the first quarter, Tress Way's 57-yard punt and a 12-yard penalty against Green Bay pinned the Packers back at their own 8-yard line. A few plays later, Preston Smith sacked Aaron Rodgers in the end zone for a safety, giving Washington a 2–0 lead. On the ensuing drive the Redskins drove to the Green Bay 1-yard line with a 14-yard pass from Kirk Cousins to DeSean Jackson that was initially ruled a touchdown but reversed upon review. The Packers defense held the Redskins to a 25-yard Dustin Hopkins field goal, and Washington led 5–0 at the end of the first quarter.

Early in the second quarter, Washington drove 64 yards in seven plays, including a 20-yard reception by tight end Jordan Reed and a 13-yard catch by Pierre Garçon, to score on Cousins' 24-yard touchdown pass to Reed; Hopkins missed the extra point, therefore Washington took an 11–0 lead. Green Bay, however, responded by scoring 17 points by the end of the half. First, a 34-yard completion from Rodgers to James Jones set up a 12-yard touchdown pass to Randall Cobb. Then linebacker Mike Neal forced and recovered a fumble while sacking Cousins on the Packers' 46-yard line, resulting in a 30-yard drive that ended with Mason Crosby's 43-yard field goal. Washington had to punt on their next drive, and Micah Hyde returned the ball 17 yards to the Packers 40-yard line. Green Bay then drove 60 yards, including a 20-yard reception by Davante Adams on 3rd-and-2, to score on Rodgers' 10-yard touchdown toss to Adams, giving the team a 17–11 lead with 28 seconds left in the half.

Washington regrouped on their first possession of the second half, scoring on a 9-play, 74-yard drive, starting off with a 21-yard reception by Garçon, and Alfred Morris had a 19-yard carry on the next play. Cousins later completed a 17-yard pass to Reed before finishing the drive with a 3-yard touchdown run, regaining the lead at 18–17.

On the Packers' ensuing drive, they faced a 4th-and-1 situation on the Redskins' 45-yard line. In what turned out to be a critical play, Eddie Lacy picked up the first down with an 11-yard run. Lacy added a 30-yard run on the next play, and James Starks finished the drive with a 4-yard rushing touchdown, giving the Packers a 24–18 lead. On their next drive the Packers scored for the fifth straight possession as a 22-yard carry by Starks set up Lacy's 2-yard touchdown run and Jared Abbrederis' 2-point conversion catch to make the score 32–18. Washington was unable to score again as Cousins was sacked twice on fourth down plays, once by linebacker Nick Perry and once by Neal. Perry's sack resulted in a turnover on the Redskins' 17-yard line, leading to Crosby's 29-yard field goal that made the final score 35–18.

Rodgers finished the game with 210 yards and a pair of touchdowns, while Cousins recorded 329 yards with a touchdown. Reed was the top receiver with nine receptions for 120 yards, becoming the first Redskins tight end with 100 receiving yards in a playoff game. This is now the last playoff game involving a team named, "The Redskins".

This was the third postseason meeting between the Packers and Redskins. Both teams split their previous two meetings, the last of which Washington won 16–3 in the 1972 NFC Divisional playoffs.

== Divisional round ==
In contrast to wild card weekend, all four of the home teams won their games this weekend.

=== Saturday, January 16, 2016 ===
==== AFC: New England Patriots 27, Kansas City Chiefs 20 ====
Kansas City Chiefs vs. New England Patriots – Game summary

Quarter	1	2	3	4	Total
Chiefs	3	3	7	7	20
Patriots	7	7	7	6	27

at Gillette Stadium in Foxborough, Massachusetts

- Date: January 16
- Game time: 4:35 PM EST
- Game weather: 38 °F (3 °C), partly cloudy
- Game attendance: 66,829
- Referee: Craig Wrolstad
- TV announcers (CBS): Ian Eagle, Dan Fouts, and Evan Washburn
- Recap, Gamebook

Game information

1st quarter

- NE – Rob Gronkowski 8-yard pass from Tom Brady (Stephen Gostkowski kick), 10:23. Patriots 7–0. Drive: 11 plays, 80 yards, 4:37.
- KC – Cairo Santos 34-yard field goal, 1:52. Patriots 7–3. Drive: 17 plays, 64 yards, 8:31.

2nd quarter

- NE – Tom Brady 1-yard run (Stephen Gostkowski kick), 3:23. Patriots 14–3. Drive: 11 plays, 98 yards, 5:36.
- KC – Cairo Santos 32-yard field goal, 0:12. Patriots 14–6. Drive: 11 plays, 52 yards, 3:11.

3rd quarter

- NE – Rob Gronkowski 16-yard pass from Tom Brady (Stephen Gostkowski kick), 8:24. Patriots 21–6. Drive: 5 plays, 69 yards, 2:07.
- KC – Albert Wilson 10-yard pass from Alex Smith (Cairo Santos kick), 2:12. Patriots 21–13. Drive: 12 plays, 80 yards, 6:12.

4th quarter

- NE – Stephen Gostkowski 40-yard field goal, 14:46. Patriots 24–13. Drive: 8 plays, 57 yards, 2:26.
- NE – Stephen Gostkowski 32-yard field goal, 10:20. Patriots 27–13. Drive: 5 plays, 19 yards, 2:06.
- KC – Charcandrick West 1-yard run (Cairo Santos kick), 1:13. Patriots 27–20. Drive: 16 plays, 80 yards, 5:16.

Top passers

- KC – Alex Smith – 29/50, 246 yards, TD
- NE – Tom Brady – 28/42, 302 yards, 2 TD

Top rushers

- KC – Charcandrick West – 17 rushes, 61 yards, TD
- NE – Steven Jackson – 6 rushes, 16 yards

Top receivers

- KC – Jason Avant – 4 receptions, 69 yards
- NE – Julian Edelman – 10 receptions, 100 yards

Playing in an NFL record-tying 30th postseason game, Patriots quarterback Tom Brady completed 28 of 42 passes for 302 yards and two touchdowns, without being sacked or throwing any interceptions, and also rushing for a score as he led the team to their fifth consecutive AFC championship game.

New England scored on their opening drive, moving the ball 80 yards in 11 plays. When faced with 3rd-and-13 on the Chiefs' 43-yard line, Brady completed a 32-yard pass to tight end Rob Gronkowski, and later found Gronkowski in the end zone for an 8-yard score. Kansas City responded with a 17-play, 64-yard drive, including quarterback Alex Smith's 15-yard run on 3rd-and-13. The Patriots defense managed to halt the drive on their own 16-yard line, forcing the Chiefs to settle for Cairo Santos' 34-yard field goal to make the score 7–3.

In the second quarter, Chiefs punter Dustin Colquitt's 33-yard kick pinned the Patriots back on their own 4-yard line, with a penalty against New England taking away another two yards. But it did not stop New England from driving 98 yards in 11 plays on a drive where they faced only two third downs. The key play of the drive was a 42-yard completion from Brady to receiver Keshawn Martin. Brady later ran the ball 10 yards to the Chiefs' 1-yard line on a scramble, and then took the ball into the end zone on the next play, giving the Patriots a 14–3 lead. Knile Davis returned the ensuing kickoff 34 yards, then Charcandrick West subsequently rushed for a 17-yard gain and Smith completed a 26-yard pass to Jason Avant; the team drove to a 32-yard Santos field goal that made the score 14–6 at halftime.

Kansas City started off the second half with a drive to the Patriots' 40-yard line. But linebacker Dont'a Hightower made a critical play, forcing and recovering a fumble from Davis after he caught a 9-yard pass. Taking the ball at the Chiefs' 31-yard line, Brady completed five consecutive passes for double-digit gains, the last one a 16-yard touchdown throw to Gronkowski that gave the team a 21–6 lead. Kansas City struck right back, converting two third downs and one fourth down on an 80-yard drive featuring a 26-yard reception by Avant. Smith finished the drive with a 10-yard touchdown pass to Albert Wilson, cutting their deficit to 21–13 with two minutes left in the third quarter.

A few plays into the fourth quarter, Stephen Gostkowski gave the Patriots a 24–13 lead with a 40-yard field goal at the end of a drive that was sparked by Brady's 29-yard completion to running back James White. Kansas City had to punt on their next drive, and Danny Amendola returned the ball 22 yards to the Chiefs' 32-yard line, setting up another Gostkowski field goal that upped the New England lead to 27–13. Kansas City responded with a drive to the New England 49-yard line, but ended up turning the ball over on downs. Following a punt Kansas City got the ball back with 6:29 left. They proceeded to drive 80 yards in 16 plays for a score, including a 13-yard catch by Avant on 4th-and-8 and a 19-yard reception by Wilson. West finished the drive with a 1-yard touchdown run that made the score 27–20, with 1:13 remaining.

Kansas City attempted an onside kick, but failed to recover it. With all three of their timeouts left, they still had a chance to force a punt, but on the second play of New England's ensuing drive, Brady's 12-yard pass off a deflection to Julian Edelman sealed the victory for the Patriots, and ended Kansas City's 11-game winning streak.

Edelman was the top receiver of the game with 10 receptions for 100 yards. Gronkowski caught seven passes for 83 yards and a pair of touchdowns; with eight career postseason touchdowns, Gronkowski – in his sixth season – set an all-time record for postseason touchdowns by a tight end. Smith completed 29 of a career-high 50 pass attempts for 246 yards and a touchdown. Avant, who caught just 15 passes during the season, was the Chiefs' leading receiver with four receptions for 69 yards. West was the leading rusher of the game with 61 yards and a touchdown, adding two receptions for 15 yards.

This was the first postseason meeting between the Chiefs and Patriots.

==== NFC: Arizona Cardinals 26, Green Bay Packers 20 (OT) ====
Green Bay Packers vs. Arizona Cardinals – Game summary

Quarter	1	2	3	4	OT	Total
Packers	0	6	7	7	0	20
Cardinals	7	0	3	10	6	26

at University of Phoenix Stadium in Glendale, Arizona

- Date: January 16
- Game time: 8:15 PM EST/6:15 PM MST
- Game weather: Played indoors (retractable roof closed)
- Game attendance: 65,089
- Referee: Clete Blakeman
- TV announcers (NBC): Al Michaels, Cris Collinsworth, and Michele Tafoya
- Recap, Gamebook

Game information

1st quarter

- ARI – Michael Floyd 8-yard pass from Carson Palmer (Chandler Catanzaro kick), 6:48. Cardinals 7–0. Drive: 11 plays, 42 yards, 6:21.

2nd quarter

- GB – Mason Crosby 28-yard field goal, 11:22. Cardinals 7–3. Drive: 17 plays, 85 yards, 7:31.
- GB – Mason Crosby 34-yard field goal, 0:57. Cardinals 7–6. Drive: 17 plays, 71 yards, 7:55.

3rd quarter

- GB – Jeff Janis 8-yard pass from Aaron Rodgers (Mason Crosby kick), 10:17. Packers 13–7. Drive: 6 plays, 81 yards, 3:05.
- ARI – Chandler Catanzaro 28-yard field goal, 5:05. Packers 13–10. Drive: 10 plays, 74 yards, 5:12.

4th quarter

- ARI – Michael Floyd 9-yard pass from Carson Palmer (Chandler Catanzaro kick), 3:44. Cardinals 17–13. Drive: 14 plays, 80 yards, 7:09.
- ARI – Chandler Catanzaro 36-yard field goal, 1:55. Cardinals 20–13. Drive: 4 plays, 6 yards, 0:43.
- GB – Jeff Janis 41-yard pass from Aaron Rodgers (Mason Crosby kick), 0:00. Tied 20–20. Drive: 6 plays, 86 yards, 1:55.

Overtime

- ARI – Larry Fitzgerald 5-yard pass from Carson Palmer, 13:55. Cardinals 26–20. Drive: 3 plays, 80 yards, 1:05.

Top passers

- GB – Aaron Rodgers – 24/44, 261 yards, 2 TD, INT
- ARI – Carson Palmer – 25/41, 349 yards, 3 TD, 2 INT

Top rushers

- GB – Eddie Lacy – 12 rushes, 89 yards
- ARI – David Johnson – 15 rushes, 35 yards

Top receivers

- GB – Jeff Janis – 7 receptions, 145 yards, 2 TD
- ARI – Larry Fitzgerald – 8 receptions, 176 yards, TD

Green Bay quarterback Aaron Rodgers' 41-yard touchdown pass to Jeff Janis that tied the game on the last play of regulation was quickly answered by Cardinals quarterback Carson Palmer, who threw a 75-yard completion to Larry Fitzgerald on the first play of overtime and then a 5-yard touchdown pass to him to win the game. This gave Palmer his first career playoff win at age 36, after 13 seasons in the NFL.

After each team punted on their first possession, Patrick Peterson's 12-yard punt return gave the Cardinals a first down on the Packers' 42-yard line. Arizona then drove 42 yards in 11 plays, including a 2-yard run by David Johnson on 4th-and-1, to go up 7–0 on Palmer's 8-yard touchdown pass to receiver Michael Floyd. Following another exchange of punts, Green Bay drove 85 yards in 17 plays, featuring a 19-yard scramble by Rodgers, to cut the score to 7–3 on Mason Crosby's 28-yard field goal. This drive had two big plays nullified by penalties; one of which was a 51-yard one-handed catch by Randall Cobb that was wiped out by offsetting penalties on both teams. Not only did this eliminate the catch, but Cobb – the Packers' leading receiver during the season – was injured on the play and missed the rest of the game. Later on, Rodgers threw a pass that Peterson intercepted and returned 100 yards for a touchdown, but this was eliminated by an illegal use of hands penalty on defensive lineman Frostee Rucker. Following an Arizona punt, the Packers went on another long scoring drive, this one covering 71 yards in 17 plays and taking 7:55 off the clock. Receiver Jared Abbrederis had the drive's longest gain with an 18-yard reception, while Crosby added another field goal, making the score 7–6 with 55 seconds left in the half.

Four plays into the third quarter, Cardinals safety Rashad Johnson intercepted a pass from Rodgers on the Packers' 47-yard line. A few plays later, Palmer also threw an interception, which was taken in by safety Ha Ha Clinton-Dix. On the second play after the turnover, Eddie Lacy gained 14 yards. Then he stormed through the line for a 61-yard run to the Arizona 8-yard line. Rodgers eventually finished the drive with an 8-yard pass to Janis, giving Green Bay their first lead at 13–7. The Cardinals struck back with a 10-play, 74-yard drive, featuring a 32-yard reception by Fitzgerald, to cut the score to 13–10 with Chandler Catanzaro's 28-yard field goal. Following a Packers punt, Arizona drove to the Green Bay 10-yard line, but on the second play of the fourth quarter, cornerback Damarious Randall intercepted a pass from Palmer in the end zone. After Green Bay punted, Arizona got the ball on their own 20-yard line with 10:53 left. Palmer completed a 21-yard pass to John Brown on the second play of the drive, and later completed a 13-yarder to Fitzgerald. Eventually, the team got a first down on the Packers' 19-yard line. On the next play after that, Palmer threw a pass that bounced out of the hands of defensive back Sam Shields. After an incomplete pass, Palmer threw a pass to Johnson, who just barely managed to backpedal across the first down marker as he was falling to the ground. Then from the 9-yard line, Palmer threw a pass that was deflected by Randall, but fell right into the hands of Floyd for a touchdown, giving the Cardinals a 17–13 lead with 3:44 left.

A few plays into their ensuing drive, Green Bay faced 4th-and-5 on their own 25-yard line. With only one timeout remaining, they decided to go for the first down, but Rodgers' pass was incomplete and the Cardinals took over with 2:38 left. Arizona was unable to get a first down on their drive, which included an incomplete pass that helped the Packers save some time. Catanzaro finished the drive with a 36-yard field goal, putting the Cardinals up 20–13, but the team had only managed to run 43 seconds off the clock, 1:55 remained. Green Bay got the ball back on their own 14-yard line with 1:50 left. Two incompletions and a 10-yard sack by Dwight Freeney brought up 4th-and-20, but Rodgers managed to overcome the situation by launching a 60-yard completion to Janis on the Arizona 36-yard line. With time ticking away, Rodgers rushed his team back to the line, appearing at first to want to spike the ball, but ran the play – the team could not get set before the snap, resulting in an illegal motion penalty that pushed them back five yards and cost them more time. After an incompletion, only five seconds remained in the game. Rodgers, took the snap, ran left and launched a Hail Mary pass to the end zone just before being leveled by linebacker Markus Golden. Janis then made a leaping catch in the end zone between two defenders for a 41-yard touchdown reception, sending the game into overtime. This was the first game-tying touchdown pass on the last play of regulation in postseason history and the second time that Rodgers threw a Hail Mary touchdown pass at the end of regulation in the season, after the Miracle in Motown.

Arizona won the coin toss – which had to be redone after the coin did not flip in the air on the first attempt – and elected to receive. On their first play after the touchback, Palmer took the snap, evaded a tackle attempt by linebacker Mike Neal, ran right, and threw the ball to Fitzgerald on the left side the field just before being reached by defensive end Mike Daniels. Fitzgerald caught the ball wide open near the Arizona 35-yard line and broke three tackles as he took off for a 75-yard gain before he was dragged down by Casey Hayward on the Packers' 5-yard line. After an incompletion, Palmer flipped the ball to Fitzgerald on a shovel pass, and he took it into the end zone for the game winning score, giving the Cardinals their first playoff victory since 2009 – also a home overtime win against the Packers they had won with a touchdown on the third play from scrimmage in overtime – and their first NFC Championship game since 2008.

Palmer completed 25 of 41 passes for 359 yards and three touchdowns, with two interceptions. Fitzgerald, who had a single reception for six yards in the first half, caught eight passes for 176 yards and a touchdown, his fifth consecutive 100-yard postseason game. Brown caught five passes for 82 yards. Rodgers finished the game 24 for 44 for 261 yards with a pair of touchdowns and an interception. Janis, who caught only two passes during the season, caught seven passes for 145 yards and a pair of touchdowns. Lacy was the top rusher of the game with 89 yards. The day after the game, the Arizona Republic celebrated the victory by titling the front page Hail Larry.

This was the third postseason meeting between the Packers and Cardinals. Both teams split the first two meetings, the last of which Arizona won 51–45 in OT in the 2009 NFC Wild Card playoffs.

=== Sunday, January 17, 2016 ===
==== NFC: Carolina Panthers 31, Seattle Seahawks 24 ====
Seattle Seahawks vs. Carolina Panthers – Game summary

Quarter	1	2	3	4	Total
Seahawks	0	0	14	10	24
Panthers	14	17	0	0	31

at Bank of America Stadium in Charlotte, North Carolina

- Date: January 17
- Game time: 1:05 PM EST
- Game weather: 43 °F (6 °C), partly cloudy
- Game attendance: 74,287
- Referee: Tony Corrente
- TV announcers (Fox): Joe Buck, Troy Aikman, Erin Andrews, and Chris Myers
- Recap, Gamebook

Game information

1st quarter

- CAR – Jonathan Stewart 4-yard run (Graham Gano kick), 12:30. Panthers 7–0. Drive: 4 plays, 75 yards, 2:30.
- CAR – Luke Kuechly 14-yard interception return (Graham Gano kick), 11:38. Panthers 14–0.

2nd quarter

- CAR – Jonathan Stewart 1-yard run (Graham Gano kick), 14:18. Panthers 21–0. Drive: 15 plays, 86 yards, 8:44.
- CAR – Graham Gano 48-yard field goal, 12:37. Panthers 24–0. Drive: 4 plays, −1 yard, 1:35.
- CAR – Greg Olsen 19-yard pass from Cam Newton (Graham Gano kick), 6:26. Panthers 31–0. Drive: 9 plays, 54 yards, 4:45.

3rd quarter

- SEA – Jermaine Kearse 13-yard pass from Russell Wilson (Steven Hauschka kick), 13:27. Panthers 31–7. Drive: 4 plays, 35 yards, 1:33.
- SEA – Tyler Lockett 33-yard pass from Russell Wilson (Steven Hauschka kick), 7:40. Panthers 31–14. Drive: 7 plays, 63 yards, 2:40.

4th quarter

- SEA – Jermaine Kearse 3-yard pass from Russell Wilson (Steven Hauschka kick), 6:04. Panthers 31–21. Drive: 9 plays, 73 yards, 3:28.
- SEA – Steven Hauschka 36-yard field goal, 1:12. Panthers 31–24. Drive: 11 plays, 60 yards, 1:37.

Top passers

- SEA – Russell Wilson – 31/48, 366 yards, 3 TD, 2 INT
- CAR – Cam Newton – 16/22, 161 yards, TD

Top rushers

- SEA – Russell Wilson – 3 rushes, 32 yards
- CAR – Jonathan Stewart – 19 rushes, 106 yards, 2 TD

Top receivers

- SEA – Jermaine Kearse – 11 receptions, 110 yards, 2 TD
- CAR – Greg Olsen – 6 receptions, 77 yards, TD

The Panthers jumped out to a 31–0 halftime lead and held off a second half rally from the Seahawks to prevail 31–24 and advance to the NFC Championship for the first time since 2005.

Panthers running back Jonathan Stewart ran for 59 yards to the Seahawks 16-yard line on the first offensive play of the game, then scored a touchdown from four yards out to give Carolina an early lead. Then, on the Seahawks' second play, Luke Kuechly intercepted a pass from Russell Wilson and returned it 14 yards for a touchdown, giving Carolina a 14–0 lead less than four minutes into the game. After forcing a Seahawks punt, Carolina mounted a 15-play, 86-yard drive which featured a 27-yard reception by tight end Greg Olsen and culminated in a Stewart 1-yard touchdown run early in the second quarter. Wilson then threw his second interception on the first play of the next drive, this time to Cortland Finnegan on the Seattle 29-yard line, and a Graham Gano 48-yard field goal put Carolina up 24–0. After a Seahawks three-and-out, Carolina drove 54 yards and scored another touchdown with a Cam Newton 19-yard pass Olsen. Now trailing 31–0, Seattle drove to the Carolina 18-yard line but turned the ball over on downs when Doug Baldwin was tackled a yard short of a first down on 4th-and-5. Seattle had another chance to cut the deficit at the end of the half, but Steven Hauschka missed a 55-yard field goal as time expired.

Seattle got on the board on the first drive of the second half after Tyler Lockett returned the opening kickoff to 50 yards to midfield and Carolina was called for an unnecessary roughness penalty. Wilson found Jermaine Kearse for a 13-yard touchdown. After forcing a Panthers punt, Seattle drove 63 yards for another touchdown. Wilson rushed for 14 yards, completed a 16-yard pass to Kearse, and eventually finished the drive with 33-yard scoring pass to Lockett, cutting the deficit to 31–14. Seattle drove into Carolina territory again on their next drive which included a 17-yard first down run by DeShawn Shead on a fake punt, but Wilson was sacked for a 14-yard loss by Josh Norman and they were unable to score. On their next drive Wilson completed a 27-yard pass to Lockett that was originally ruled incomplete but overturned on review, then threw another touchdown to Kearse from three yards out to get to within 10 points with 6:11 remaining. Carolina was forced to punt again on their next possession, but Seattle was unable to find the end zone and settled for a 36-yard field goal. Now trailing by a touchdown with 1:12 remaining and only one timeout left, Seattle attempted an onside kick which was recovered by Carolina linebacker Thomas Davis, allowing the Panthers to run out the clock and preserve the victory.

Wilson finished with 366 yards on 31 of 48 passing with three touchdowns and two interceptions, while Newton had 161 yards and one touchdown. Stewart gained 106 yards on the ground, the first time in 27 games that Seattle had allowed a 100-yard rusher. Seahawks running back Marshawn Lynch returned to the lineup after missing eight games but was held to just 20 yards on six carries. Kearse was the leading receiver with 11 receptions for 110 yards and two touchdowns. Their 31 points was a new Panthers franchise record in a playoff game. Seattle lost despite outgaining Carolina 280–72 in total yards during the second half.

This was the second consecutive postseason meeting between the Seahawks and Panthers and third overall. Seattle won both prior meetings, including 31–17 in the 2014 NFC Divisional playoffs.

==== AFC: Denver Broncos 23, Pittsburgh Steelers 16 ====
Pittsburgh Steelers vs. Denver Broncos – Game summary

Quarter	1	2	3	4	Total
Steelers	7	3	3	3	16
Broncos	6	3	3	11	23

at Sports Authority Field at Mile High in Denver, Colorado

- Date: January 17
- Game time: 4:40 PM EST/2:40 PM MST
- Game weather: 43 °F (6 °C), sunny
- Game attendance: 76,956
- Referee: Terry McAulay
- TV announcers (CBS): Jim Nantz, Phil Simms, and Tracy Wolfson
- Recap, Gamebook

Game information

1st quarter

- DEN – Brandon McManus 28-yard field goal, 11:21. Broncos 3–0. Drive: 5 plays, 20 yards, 1:57.
- DEN – Brandon McManus 41-yard field goal, 3:40. Broncos 6–0. Drive: 4 plays, 8 yards, 1:26.
- PIT – Fitzgerald Toussaint 1-yard run (Chris Boswell kick), 1:22. Steelers 7–6. Drive: 5 plays, 80 yards, 2:18.

2nd quarter

- PIT – Chris Boswell 43-yard field goal, 10:19. Steelers 10–6. Drive: 7 plays, 60 yards, 3:53.
- DEN – Brandon McManus 51-yard field goal, 0:00. Steelers 10–9. Drive: 11 plays, 62 yards, 3:14.

3rd quarter

- PIT – Chris Boswell 28-yard field goal, 9:32. Steelers 13–9. Drive: 8 plays, 69 yards, 2:19.
- DEN – Brandon McManus 41-yard field goal, 2:45. Steelers 13–12. Drive: 7 plays, 30 yards, 3:08.

4th quarter

- DEN – C. J. Anderson 1-yard run (Peyton Manning–Demaryius Thomas pass), 3:00. Broncos 20–13. Drive: 13 plays, 65 yards, 6:52.
- DEN – Brandon McManus 45-yard field goal, 0:53. Broncos 23–13. Drive: 4 plays, 3 yards, 0:56.
- PIT – Chris Boswell 47-yard field goal, 0:19. Broncos 23–16. Drive: 4 plays, 51 yards, 0:34.

Top passers

- PIT – Ben Roethlisberger – 24/37, 339 yards
- DEN – Peyton Manning – 21/37, 222 yards

Top rushers

- PIT – Martavis Bryant – 2 rushes, 40 yards
- DEN – C. J. Anderson – 15 rushes, 72 yards, TD

Top receivers

- PIT – Martavis Bryant – 9 receptions, 154 yards
- DEN – Emmanuel Sanders – 5 receptions, 85 yards

In a tough defensive struggle in which both teams could only get the ball into the end zone once, Denver pulled ahead by scoring 11 points in the final three minutes of the game.

At the end of the game's opening possession, Broncos safety Omar Bolden returned a punt 42 yards to the Pittsburgh 30-yard line, setting up Brandon McManus' 28-yard field goal. Later in the first quarter, Britton Colquitt's 57-yard punt pinned the Steelers back at their own 3-yard line. Pittsburgh was unable to get a first down with their ensuing drive, and Jordan Berry's 27-yard punt gave Denver a first down on the Steelers 31. Despite their excellent starting position, Denver could not get into the end zone and ended up with another McManus field goal to take a 6–0 lead. Pittsburgh took the ball back and stormed 80 yards in just five plays. First, Ben Roethlisberger completed a 23-yard pass to receiver Martavis Bryant. Then Bryant took a handoff on a reverse and raced 40 yards to the Broncos 16-yard line. Fitzgerald Toussaint finished the drive with two carries; the first for 15 yards and the second a 1-yard score that gave Pittsburgh a 7–6 lead with less than two minutes left in the first quarter.

On Pittsburgh's next possession, Roethlisberger's 58-yard completion to Darrius Heyward-Bey set up a 43-yard Chris Boswell field goal that increased their lead to 10–6. Denver had a chance to respond with a drive to the Steelers 37-yard line, but they turned the ball over with an incomplete pass on 4th-and-3. Late in the second quarter, Berry booted a 50-yard punt that gave the Broncos the ball at their own 5-yard line. But a 34-yard burst by running back C. J. Anderson sparked a 62-yard drive then ended with McManus' 51-yard field goal, cutting the score to 10–9 on the last play of the first half.

After forcing Denver to punt of the first drive of the second half, Pittsburgh put together a 69-yard scoring drive featuring a 58-yard reception by Bryant. Boswell finished it with a 28-yard field goal, increasing the Steelers lead to 13–9. Denver had to punt again on their next drive, but Colquitt once again gave the team a big assist, this time with a 51-yard punt that put the ball on the Steelers 6-yard line. Pittsburgh could not get a first down, and Berry's 43-yard punt gave the ball back to Denver on their own 47-yard line. The Broncos were only able to move the ball 30 yards with their ensuing drive, but it was enough for McManus to make a 41-yard field goal, trimming their deficit to 13–12.

Pittsburgh took the ball back and drove to the Broncos 34-yard line, but were halted there and decided to punt instead of trying a long field goal. The Broncos also ended up punting, and Pittsburgh drove back to the Denver 34-yard line with three consecutive Roethlisberger completions for 39 total yards. But on the next play, the first turnover of the game occurred when safety Bradley Roby forced a fumble from Toussaint that was recovered by linebacker DeMarcus Ware.

Now with 9:52 left in the game, 39-year old Broncos quarterback Peyton Manning took to the field and led the team 65 yards in 13 plays for the go-ahead score. The key play of the drive was a 31-yard completion from Manning to rookie receiver Bennie Fowler on 3rd-and-12 from the Broncos 33-yard line. Running back Ronnie Hillman also made a big impact, with five carries for 18 yards. After Fowler's catch, the Broncos would not face another third down on the drive until the last play of the drive, when Anderson converted a 3rd-and-goal with a 1-yard touchdown run. Then Manning completed a pass to Demaryius Thomas for a 2-point conversion, giving the Broncos a 20–13 lead with three minutes left on the clock.

Pittsburgh started off their next drive with an 18-yard catch by Bryant, but ended up facing 4th-and-5 on their own 43-yard line with less than two minutes left. They tried to pick up a first down, but Ware sacked Roethlisberger for a 13-yard loss. Taking over at the Steelers 30-yard line, Denver forced Pittsburgh to use up all their timeouts with three consecutive running plays. Then McManus kicked a 45-yard field goal that gave the Broncos a 23–13 lead with 53 seconds to go. A 20-yard pass interference penalty on safety T. J. Ward and a 22-yard reception by Bryant enabled Boswell to bring the deficit back to one score with a 47-yard field goal. But Anderson eliminated any chance of a comeback by recovering Boswell's ensuing onside kick.

Manning completed 22 of 37 passes for 222 yards. Emmanuel Sanders caught five of them for 85 yards. Anderson was the top rusher of the game with 72 yards and a touchdown, while also catching two passes for 11 yards. Ware had three tackles, a sack, and a fumble recovery. McManus tied a playoff record with five field goals. Roethlisberger finished the game 24 of 37 for 339 yards. Bryant caught nine passes for 154 yards and had two carries for 40 yards. Linebacker James Harrison had seven tackles and a sack.

This was the eighth postseason meeting between the Steelers and Broncos. Denver won four of the prior seven meetings, including the last meeting 29–23 in OT in the 2011 AFC Wild Card playoffs.

== Conference championships ==
=== Sunday, January 24, 2016 ===
==== AFC: Denver Broncos 20, New England Patriots 18 ====
New England Patriots vs. Denver Broncos – Game summary

Quarter	1	2	3	4	Total
Patriots	6	3	3	6	18
Broncos	7	10	0	3	20

at Sports Authority Field at Mile High in Denver, Colorado

- Date: January 24
- Game time: 3:05 p.m. EST/ 1:05 p.m. MST
- Game weather: 46 °F (8 °C), mostly sunny
- Game attendance: 77,112
- Referee: Ed Hochuli
- TV announcers (CBS): Jim Nantz, Phil Simms, Tracy Wolfson, and Evan Washburn
- Recap, Gamebook

Game information

1st quarter

- DEN – Owen Daniels 21-yard pass from Peyton Manning (Brandon McManus kick), 7:32. Broncos 7–0. Drive: 11 plays, 83 yards, 5:30.
- NE – Steven Jackson 1-yard run (kick failed, wide right), 1:49. Broncos 7–6. Drive: 2 plays, 22 yards, 0:34.

2nd quarter

- DEN – Owen Daniels 12-yard pass from Peyton Manning (Brandon McManus kick), 13:46. Broncos 14–6. Drive: 3 plays, 16 yards, 0:49.
- NE – Stephen Gostkowski 46-yard field goal, 7:07. Broncos 14–9. Drive: 13 plays, 48 yards, 6:44.
- DEN – Brandon McManus 52-yard field goal, 0:38. Broncos 17–9. Drive: 6 plays, 23 yards, 1:13.

3rd quarter

- NE – Stephen Gostkowski 38-yard field goal, 10:31. Broncos 17–12. Drive: 8 plays, 47 yards, 2:49.

4th quarter

- DEN – Brandon McManus 31-yard field goal, 10:06. Broncos 20–12. Drive: 10 plays, 48 yards, 4:58.
- NE - Rob Gronkowski 4-yard pass from Tom Brady (pass failed), 0:13. Broncos 20–18. Drive: 8 plays, 50 yards, 1:40

Top passers

- NE – Tom Brady – 27/56, 310 yards, TD, 2 INT
- DEN – Peyton Manning – 17/32, 176 yards, 2 TD

Top rushers

- NE – Tom Brady – 3 rushes, 13 yards
- DEN – C. J. Anderson – 16 rushes, 72 yards

Top receivers

- NE – Rob Gronkowski – 8 receptions, 144 yards, TD
- DEN – Emmanuel Sanders – 5 receptions, 62 yards

Denver's defense sacked Patriots quarterback Tom Brady four times, knocked him down 20 times, intercepted two of his passes, forced a turnover on downs twice in the fourth quarter, and broke up a 2-point conversion attempt with 12 seconds left that enabled them to escape with a narrow 20–18 win, while the Patriots' defense sacked and knocked down Peyton Manning three times. With the win, the Broncos advanced to their second Super Bowl in three years and tied the Pittsburgh Steelers, Dallas Cowboys, and the Patriots for the most Super Bowl appearances with eight.

On Denver's first drive, quarterback Peyton Manning completed 4 of 6 passes for 60 yards on an 83-yard drive and then ended with his 21-yard touchdown pass to tight end Owen Daniels. Later in the quarter, Manning threw the ball on a screen pass to Ronnie Hillman that was broken up and then picked up by linebacker Jonathan Freeny. The play was initially ruled an incompletion, but a replay challenge from Bill Belichick changed the play to a New England fumble recovery on the Broncos 22-yard line, as officials ruled Manning's throw was a backwards pass instead of a forward pass. Brady completed a 20-yard pass to running back Brandon Bolden on the next play, with a penalty on Denver moving the ball up to the 1-yard line, and then Steven Jackson ran the ball into the end zone on the next play. However, Stephen Gostkowski, one of only five kickers to go through the regular season without missing an extra point, missed the extra point wide right, keeping the team behind with a score of 7–6.

Denver had to punt on their next drive, but a few plays into the second quarter, Brady threw a pass that was intercepted by linebacker Von Miller and returned four yards to the Patriots 16-yard line. Manning then scored on another touchdown pass to Daniels, this one from 12 yards, to give the Broncos a 14–6 lead. New England responded with a 48-yard drive, with Brady completing a 19-yard pass to tight end Rob Gronkowski and later scrambling for an 11-yard gain on 3rd-and-10. But on 3rd-and-3 from the Broncos 22-yard line, Miller sacked Brady for a 6-yard loss, forcing the team to settle for 14–9 score on Gostkowski's 46-yard field goal. The next time New England got the ball, Brady was intercepted by safety Darian Stewart, who returned the ball eight yards to the Broncos 44-yard line. But a false start penalty and a sack by Alan Branch shut the drive down and Denver ended up punting. Britton Colquitt's 48-yard kick pinned the Pats back at their own 12-yard line, and following another punt, the Broncos got the ball back again on their 44-yard line. This time they managed to move the ball 23 yards and score on Brandon McManus' 52-yard field goal with 33 seconds left in the half, making the score 17–9 going into halftime.

On New England's first drive of the third quarter, Brady completed a 31-yard pass to Gronkowski that set up Gostkowski's 38-yard field goal, cutting their deficit to 17–12. This would be the only score of the quarter as both teams punted on each of their next two drives. On the last play of the quarter, Denver receiver Jordan Norwood returned Ryan Allen's 43-yard punt six yards to the Broncos 39-yard line. Denver then drove 48 yards in 10 plays, including a 31-yard burst by running back C. J. Anderson, to score on McManus' 31-yard field goal, making the score 20–12 with 10:02 left on the clock. New England took the ball back and drove to the Broncos 16-yard line. But on 4th-and-1, Chris Harris tackled Julian Edelman for a 1-yard loss. Following a punt, New England got into the Broncos red zone again, this time driving all the way to the 14-yard line. This drive also ended with a turnover on downs, this time an incomplete pass on 4th-and-6.

Following a three-and-out, Edelman returned Colquitt's 52-yard punt 16 yards to midfield with 1:52 left in the game. Brady threw three consecutive incompletions, but on 4th-and-10, he launched a 40-yard bomb to Gronkowski on the Broncos 10-yard line. A few plays later, the Patriots faced 4th-and-goal from the 4-yard line, but Brady proved up to the task again, throwing a 4-yard touchdown pass to Gronkowski that made the score 20–18 with 12 seconds left on the clock. On the subsequent 2-point conversion attempt, Brady took a snap out of shotgun formation and threw a pass to Edelman, but the ball was deflected by Aqib Talib into the arms of defensive back Bradley Roby for an interception. Had New England converted the 2-point conversion, the game would have been sent to overtime for the first time in an AFC Championship in 29 years. New England then lost their last chance of the game when Gostkowski's onside kick attempt was recovered by Shiloh Keo.

Manning, who threw only one touchdown pass at home during the season, finished the game 17 of 32 for 176 yards and two touchdowns, while also rushing for 11 yards. Anderson was the top rusher of the game with 72 yards on 16 carries, and also caught three passes for 18 yards. Miller had five tackles, 2½ sacks, and an interception. Brady finished his NFL record 31st postseason game 27 of 56 for 310 yards and a touchdown, with two interceptions, while also leading the team in rushing with 13 yards. Gronkowski caught eight passes for 144 yards and a score. Linebacker Jamie Collins had eight tackles and two sacks.

With this win, Manning became the first quarterback to lead two different teams to the Super Bowl multiple times. Denver won despite being outgained in total yards 336 to 244. With the loss, the Patriots become the 11th consecutive team to surrender the Vince Lombardi Trophy to a new champion (the 2004 Patriots were the last repeat World Champion until the 2023 Kansas City Chiefs).

This was the fifth postseason meeting between the Patriots and Broncos. The home team had won all four prior meetings, in which Denver had won three of the prior four, including 26–16 in the 2013 AFC Championship Game. This was also the fifth and final postseason meeting between Tom Brady and Peyton Manning; all four were won by the home team, one of which was the 2006 AFC Championship Game in Indianapolis which Manning's Colts won en route to winning Super Bowl XLI.

==== NFC: Carolina Panthers 49, Arizona Cardinals 15 ====
Arizona Cardinals vs. Carolina Panthers – Game summary

Quarter	1	2	3	4	Total
Cardinals	0	7	0	8	15
Panthers	17	7	10	15	49

at Bank of America Stadium in Charlotte, North Carolina

- Date: January 24
- Game time: 6:40 p.m. EST
- Game weather: 39 °F (4 °C), clear
- Game attendance: 74,294
- Referee: Bill Vinovich
- TV announcers (Fox): Joe Buck, Troy Aikman, Erin Andrews and Chris Myers
- Recap, Gamebook

Game information

1st quarter

- CAR – Graham Gano 45-yard field goal, 9:30. Panthers 3–0. Drive: 8 plays, 39 yards, 3:56.
- CAR – Ted Ginn Jr. 22-yard run (Graham Gano kick), 4:31. Panthers 10–0. Drive: 5 plays, 49 yards, 3:16.
- CAR – Corey Brown 86-yard pass from Cam Newton (Graham Gano kick), 0:49. Panthers 17–0. Drive: 3 plays, 88 yards, 0:59.

2nd quarter

- ARI – David Johnson 1-yard run (Chandler Catanzaro kick), 5:44. Panthers 17–7. Drive: 10 plays, 79 yards, 6:03.
- CAR – Cam Newton 1-yard run (Graham Gano kick), 1:56. Panthers 24–7. Drive: 5 plays, 46 yards, 2:49.

3rd quarter

- CAR – Graham Gano 21-yard field goal, 7:50. Panthers 27–7. Drive: 11 plays, 80 yards, 7:10.
- CAR – Cam Newton 12-yard run, 2:08. (Graham Gano kick), Panthers 34–7. Drive: 8 plays, 79 yards, 4:11.

4th quarter

- ARI – Darren Fells 21-yard pass from Carson Palmer (J. J. Nelson run), 14:16. Panthers 34–15. Drive: 10 plays, 80 yards, 2:52.
- CAR – Devin Funchess 5-yard pass from Cam Newton (Cam Newton–Mike Tolbert pass), 5:26. Panthers 42–15. Drive: 9 plays, 84 yards, 6:12.
- CAR – Luke Kuechly 21-yard interception return (Graham Gano kick), 5:11. Panthers 49–15.

Top passers

- ARI – Carson Palmer – 23/40, 235 yards, TD, 4 INT
- CAR – Cam Newton – 19/28, 335 yards, 2 TD, INT

Top rushers

- ARI – David Johnson – 15 rushes, 60 yards, TD
- CAR – Jonathan Stewart – 19 rushes, 83 yards

Top receivers

- ARI – David Johnson – 9 receptions, 68 yards
- CAR – Corey Brown – 4 receptions, 113 yards, TD

Carolina dominated the game from start to finish, outgaining Arizona in total yards 476 to 287 and forcing seven turnovers in the first NFC Championship played at Bank of America Stadium. The Panthers accomplished this despite the loss of all-pro linebacker Thomas Davis and veteran safety Roman Harper, who both suffered game-ending injuries in the first half.

On the Panthers first drive, quarterback Cam Newton completed three passes for 32 yards and rushed for four yards on the way to a 45-yard Graham Gano field goal. Arizona had to punt on their next drive, and Ted Ginn Jr. returned it 32 yards to the Cardinals 49-yard line. Several plays later, he took a pitch on an end around play and raced 22 yards to the end zone, giving Carolina a 10–0 lead. At the end of Arizona's next drive, Drew Butler's 43-yard punt pinned the Panthers back at their own 12-yard line. On 3rd-and-8, Newton fired a pass to Corey Brown near the 40-yard line. Brown caught the ball, evaded a tackle attempt by Rashad Johnson, and took off for an 86-yard touchdown reception, making the score 17–0 with 49 seconds left in the first quarter. It was the longest play in Panthers postseason history.

Meanwhile, the Cardinals offense continued to struggle, as quarterback Carson Palmer lost a fumble due to a hit by Kawann Short, which linebacker Luke Kuechly recovered on the Panthers 38-yard line. However, this time the Cardinals defense stepped up and forced a punt. Taking the ball back at their 21-yard line, Palmer completed four consecutive passes for 45 yards as the team drove 79 yards in 10 plays to score on David Johnson's 1-yard touchdown run, cutting the deficit to 17–7. Arizona's defense then forced another punt, but in what turned out to be a critical play, returner Patrick Peterson muffed the kick and defensive back Teddy Williams recovered it for Carolina on the Cardinals 46-yard line. Consecutive carries by Jonathan Stewart moved the ball 40 yards to the Arizona 1-yard line. Then on third down, Newton dove over the pile for a 1-yard touchdown that increased the Panthers lead to 24–7 with 1:56 left in the half.

What followed was three turnovers over the span of the next four plays. First, Charles Johnson forced a fumble from Palmer that was recovered by safety Tre Boston on the Arizona 31-yard line. Then Newton returned the favor with a pass that was intercepted by Peterson, who returned it 72 yards. He appeared to be heading for the end zone, but Ginn managed to chase him down and tackle him on the Panthers 22-yard line. This turned out to be crucial, as on the next play, Palmer threw a pass that was intercepted in the end zone by safety Kurt Coleman with 49 seconds left until halftime.

Carolina took the second half kickoff and drove 80 yards in 11 plays. Newton completed five consecutive passes for 76 yards on the drive, including two to tight end Greg Olsen for 43 total yards and a 14-yarder to fullback Mike Tolbert. Gano finished the drive with a 21-yard field goal that put the team up 27–7. After a punt, Newton completed a 39-yard pass to Ginn and a 17-yard strike to Devin Funchess. Then he finished the possession with consecutive carries, the first for 11 yards, and the second a 12-yard touchdown run that increased their lead to 34–7.

Arizona took the ball back and drove for a touchdown, as Palmer completed 7 of 8 passes for 80 yards, the last one a 21-yard scoring pass to tight end Darren Fells. Then J. J. Nelson ran the ball in for a 2-point conversion, cutting the score to 34–15 less than a minute into the fourth quarter. Following a punt, Arizona drove to the Panthers 44-yard line, but their last hope of a comeback slipped away when Palmer threw a pass that was picked off by Coleman for his second interception of the day. After that, Newton completed a 54-yard pass to Olsen, rushed for 14 yards, and finished the drive with a 5-yard touchdown pass to Funchess. Then his 2-point conversion pass to Tolbert put the team up 42–15. After the ensuing kickoff, Kuechly intercepted Palmer's next pass and returned it 22 yards for the final score of the game. While the scoring was over, the turnovers were not, as Palmer was intercepted for the fourth time in the game on the next drive, this time by Boston.

Newton completed 19 of 32 passes for 335 yards and two touchdowns, with one interception, while also rushing for 47 yards and two scores. Brown caught four passes for 113 yards and a touchdown, while Olsen had six receptions for 113 yards. Stewart was the leading rusher of the game with 83 yards. Ginn rushed for 22 yards, caught two passes for 52 yards, and added 38 more yards on two punt returns. Coleman had four tackles and two interceptions, while Kuechly had eight tackles, an interception returned for a touchdown, and a fumble recovery. Boston had a fumble recovery and an interception. Meanwhile, Palmer was badly mauled by the Panthers defense, completing just 23 of 40 passes for 235 yards and a touchdown, while being intercepted four times and losing two fumbles. David Johnson was the team's leading rusher and receiver with 60 rushing yards and nine receptions for 68 yards.

This was the most lopsided NFC Championship game since the Giants shut out the Vikings 41–0 in the 2000 NFC Championship Game. Carolina's 49 points set a new record for most points in an NFC Championship Game.

This was the second consecutive postseason meeting between the Cardinals and Panthers, and third overall. The teams split the previous two meetings. Carolina won last year's meeting 27–16 in the 2014 NFC Wild Card playoffs.

== Super Bowl 50: Denver Broncos 24, Carolina Panthers 10 ==
Super Bowl 50: Carolina Panthers vs. Denver Broncos – Game summary

Quarter	1	2	3	4	Total
Panthers	0	7	0	3	10
Broncos	10	3	3	8	24

at Levi's Stadium, Santa Clara, California

- Date: February 7, 2016
- Game time: 6:30 p.m. EST/3:30 p.m. PST
- Game weather: 76 °F (24 °C), sunny
- Game attendance: 71,088
- Referee: Clete Blakeman
- TV announcers (CBS): Jim Nantz, Phil Simms, Tracy Wolfson, and Evan Washburn
- Recap, Gamebook

Game information

1st quarter

- DEN – Brandon McManus 34-yard field goal, 10:43. Broncos 3–0. Drive: 10 plays, 64 yards, 4:17.
- DEN – Malik Jackson fumble recovery in end zone (Brandon McManus kick), 6:27. Broncos 10–0.

2nd quarter

- CAR – Jonathan Stewart 1-yard run (Graham Gano kick), 11:25. Broncos 10–7. Drive: 9 plays, 73 yards, 4:50.
- DEN – Brandon McManus 33-yard field goal, 6:58 Broncos 13–7. Drive: 4 plays, 1 yard, 2:13.

3rd quarter

- DEN – Brandon McManus 30-yard field goal, 8:18 Broncos 16–7. Drive: 7 plays, 54 yards, 2:30.

4th quarter

- CAR – Graham Gano 39-yard field goal, 10:21. Broncos 16–10. Drive: 6 plays, 29 yards, 2:56.
- DEN – C. J. Anderson 2-yard run (Peyton Manning–Bennie Fowler pass), 3:08. Broncos 24–10. Drive: 3 plays, 4 yards, 0:56.

Top passers

- CAR – Cam Newton – 18/41, 265 yards, INT
- DEN – Peyton Manning – 13/23, 141 yards, INT

Top rushers

- CAR – Cam Newton – 6 rushes, 45 yards
- DEN – C. J. Anderson – 23 rushes, 90 yards, TD

Top receivers

- CAR – Corey Brown – 4 receptions, 80 yards
- DEN – Emmanuel Sanders – 6 receptions, 83 yards

Denver took the opening kickoff and started out strongly. Peyton Manning completed an 18-yard pass to tight end Owen Daniels and a 22-yard throw to receiver Andre Caldwell. A pair of carries by C. J. Anderson moved the ball up 20 yards to the Panthers 14-yard line, but Carolina's defense dug in over the next three plays. First, linebacker Shaq Thompson tackled Ronnie Hillman for a 3-yard loss. Then after an incompletion, Thomas Davis tackled Anderson for a 1-yard gain on third down, forcing Denver to settle for a 3–0 lead on a Brandon McManus 34-yard field goal. The score marked the first time in the entire postseason that Carolina was facing a deficit.

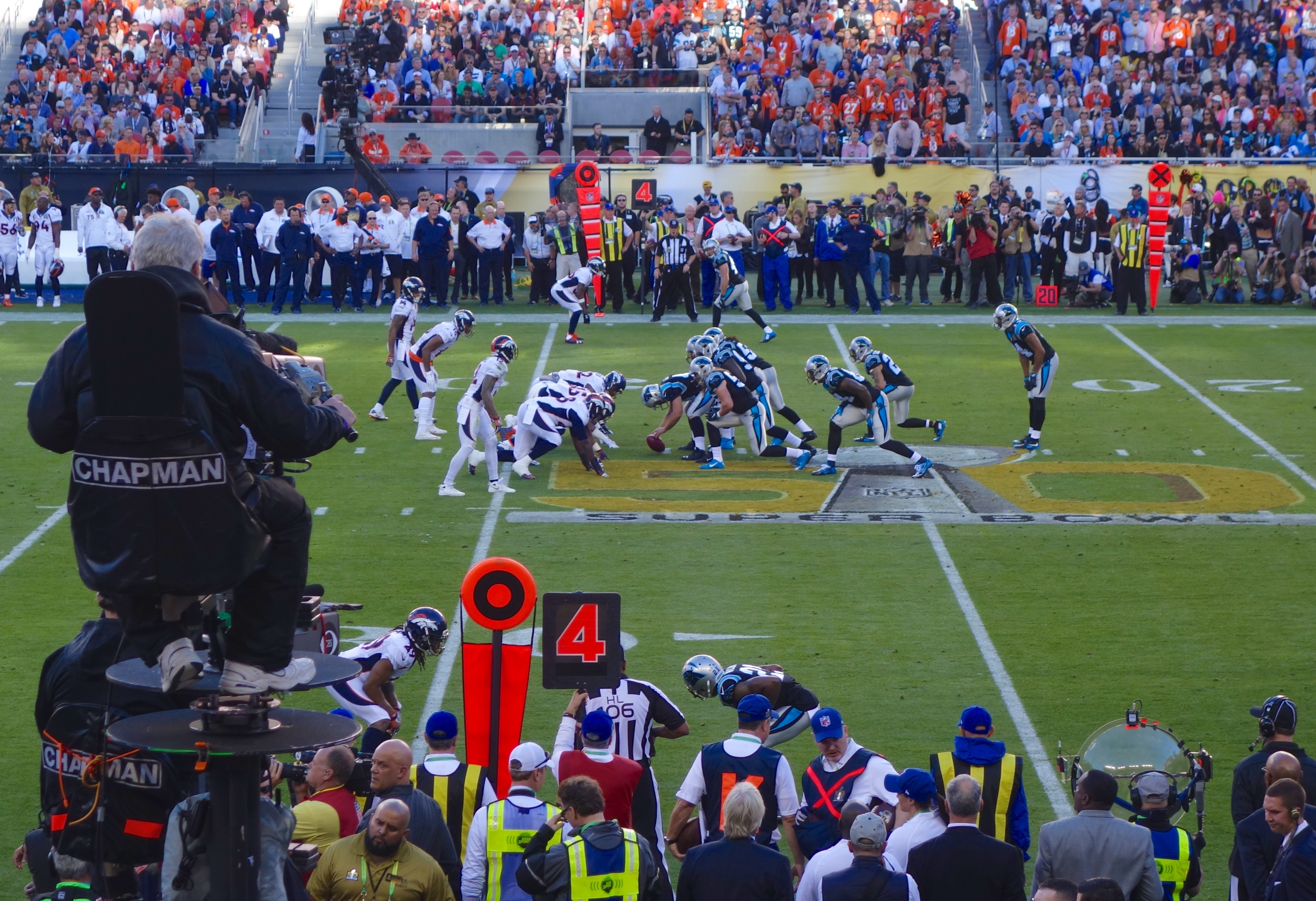
The Panthers on special teams during Super Bowl 50

After each team punted, Panthers quarterback Cam Newton appeared to complete a 24-yard pass to Jerricho Cotchery, but the call was ruled an incompletion and upheld after a replay challenge. CBS analyst and retired referee Mike Carey stated he disagreed with the call and felt the review clearly showed the pass was complete. Two plays later, on 3rd-and-10 from the 15-yard line, linebacker Von Miller knocked the ball out of Newton's hands while sacking him, and Malik Jackson recovered it in the end zone for a Broncos touchdown, giving the team a 10–0 lead. This was the first fumble return touchdown in a Super Bowl since Super Bowl XXVIII at the end of the 1993 season.

After a punt from both teams, Carolina got on track with a 9-play, 73-yard scoring drive. Newton completed all four of his pass attempts for 51 yards and rushed twice for 25 yards, while Jonathan Stewart finished the drive with a 1-yard touchdown run, cutting the score to 10–7 with 11:28 left in the second quarter. Later on, Broncos receiver Jordan Norwood received Brad Nortman's short 28-yard punt surrounded by Panthers players, but none of them attempted to make a tackle, apparently thinking Norwood had called a fair catch. Norwood had not done so, and with no resistance around him, he took off for a Super Bowl record 61-yard return before Mario Addison dragged him down on the Panthers 14-yard line. Despite Denver's excellent field position, they could not get the ball into the end zone, so McManus kicked a 33-yard field goal that increased their lead to 13–7.

On Carolina's next possession, fullback Mike Tolbert lost a fumble while being tackled by safety Darian Stewart, which linebacker Danny Trevathan recovered on the Broncos 40-yard line. However, the Panthers soon took the ball back when defensive end Kony Ealy tipped a Manning pass to himself and then intercepted it, returning the ball 19 yards to the Panthers 39-yard line with 1:55 left on the clock. The Panthers could not gain any yards with their possession and had to punt. After a Denver punt, Carolina drove to the Broncos 45-yard line. But with 11 seconds left and no timeouts left, Newton was sacked by DeMarcus Ware causing time for the half to expire. The Panthers seemed primed to score on their opening drive of the second half when Newton completed a 45-yard pass to Ted Ginn Jr. on the Denver 35-yard line on their second offensive play. But the Broncos defense halted the drive on the 26-yard line, and it ended with no points when Graham Gano hit the uprights on a 44-yard field goal attempt. After the miss, Manning completed a pair of passes to Emmanuel Sanders for gains of 25 and 22 yards, setting up McManus' 33-yard field goal that gave the Broncos a 16–7 lead. Carolina got off to another strong start after the kickoff, with Newton completing a 42-yard pass to Corey Brown. But once again they came up empty, this time as a result of a Newton pass that bounced off the hands of Ginn and was intercepted by safety T. J. Ward. Ward fumbled the ball deep in Denver territory during the return, but Trevathan was able to recover the ball enabling Denver to keep possession.

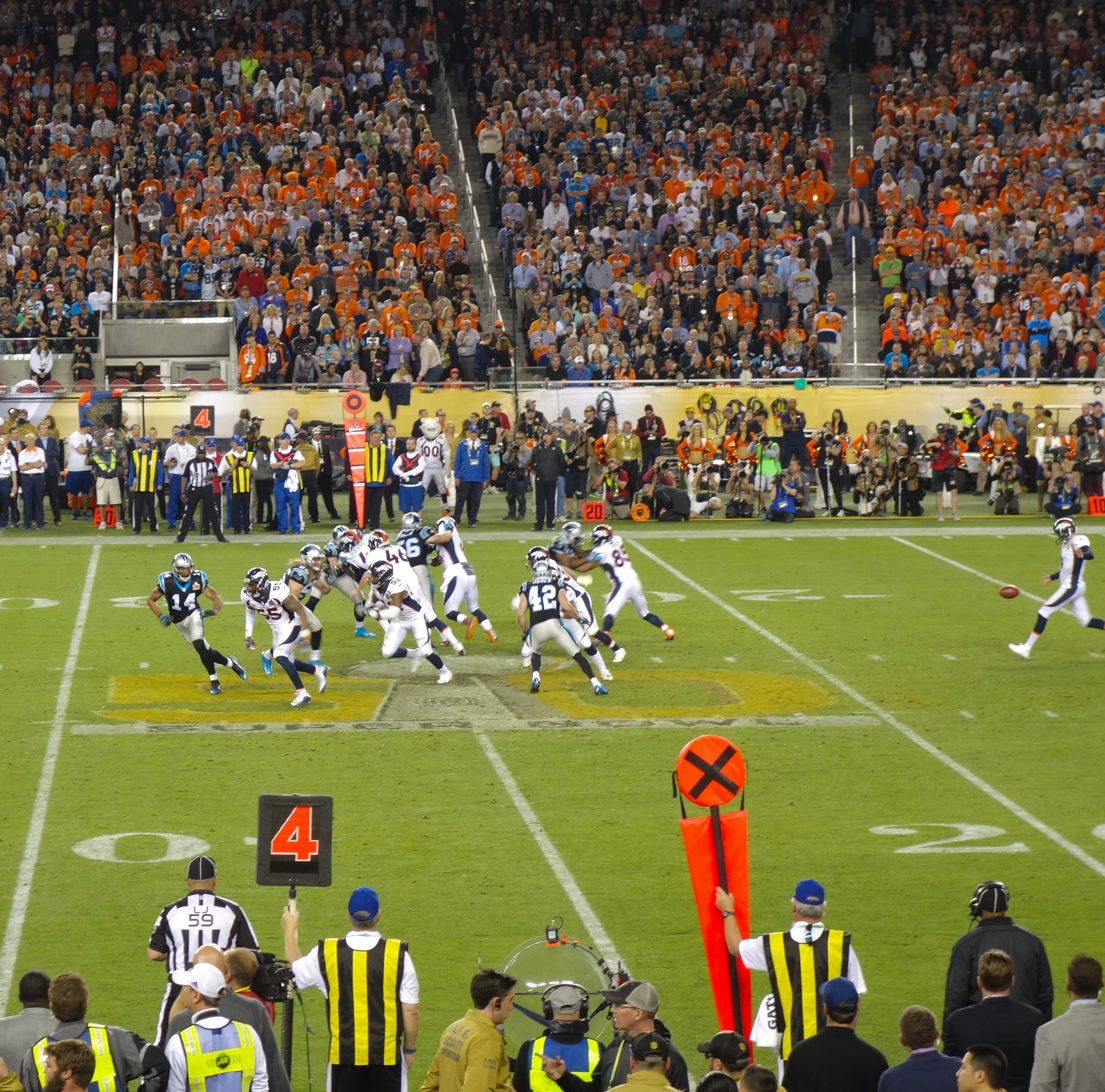
The last punt of Super Bowl 50

There would be no more scoring in the third quarter, but early in the fourth, the Broncos drove to the Panthers 41-yard line. On the next play, Ealy knocked the ball out of Manning's hand as he was winding up for a pass, and then recovered it for Carolina on the 50-yard line. A 16-yard reception by Devin Funchess and a 12-yard run by Stewart then set up Gano's 39-yard field goal, cutting the Panthers deficit to one score at 16–10. The next three drives of the game would end in punts.

With 4:51 left in regulation, Carolina got the ball on their own 24-yard line with a chance to mount a game-winning drive, and soon faced 3rd-and-9. On the next play, Miller stripped the ball away from Newton, and after several players dove for it, it took a long bounce backwards and was recovered by Ward, who returned it five yards to the Panthers 4-yard line. Newton was the third player to attempt a recovery (following Demarcus Ware and Mike Remmers) of the ball and while various angles appeared to show that he had a decent probability of recovery if he had dived in his attempt, Newton instead hesitated and instead tried to drop on top of the ball, which failed. This split second decision later earned him heavy criticism. Meanwhile, Denver's offense was kept out of the end zone for three plays, but a holding penalty on cornerback Josh Norman gave the Broncos a new set of downs. Then Anderson scored on a 2-yard touchdown run and Manning completed a pass to Bennie Fowler for a 2-point conversion, giving Denver a 24–10 lead with 3:08 left and essentially putting the game away. Carolina had two more drives and managed just one first down between them before the game ended.

This was the first Super Bowl meeting between the Panthers and Broncos.

== Television coverage ==
All playoff games aired on network television. This was the NFL's standard policy through the end of the previous television contract in 2013. After airing one game exclusively on cable on ESPN in 2014, the lone game which The Walt Disney Company owns the rights to was broadcast on both ESPN and ABC, a broadcast network with a much larger audience. From Disney's purchase of ESPN and ABC in 1996 through 2005, ABC had aired all of Disney's playoff games (the network also aired Monday Night Football at the time). The last such broadcast was Super Bowl XL after the 2005 season. Disney did not own any playoff rights from 2006 through 2013.

The ABC/ESPN simulcast was an AFC Wild Card game, while CBS broadcast the rest of the AFC playoff games. Coverage of the NFC Wild Card and Divisional rounds was split between NBC and Fox, with each network having coverage of one game in each of those two rounds. Fox had exclusive coverage of the NFC Championship Game while CBS had exclusive coverage of the AFC Championship Game and Super Bowl 50.

ESPN Deportes served as the league's Spanish-language broadcaster.

Sky Sports served as the UK's main NFL broadcaster with the BBC showing highlights.
