= John Parry (American football official) =

American football official (born 1965)

- Born: May 4, 1965 (age 60); Michigan City, Indiana, U.S.
- Occupation: NFL official (2000–2018)
- Known for: 2× Super Bowl referee (XLVI, LIII)

John W. Parry (born May 4, 1965) is an American former football official who worked in the National Football League (NFL) from 2000 through the 2018 season. He wore uniform number 132 and was the referee for two Super Bowls. From 2019 through the 2023 season, Parry was the rules analyst for NFL telecasts on ABC and ESPN including Monday Night Football and postseason games.

== Career ==
Parry was promoted to referee for the 2007 season following the retirement of Bill Vinovich due to health issues.

In 2018, Parry's NFL officiating crew consisted of umpire Mark Pellis, down judge David Oliver, line judge Julian Mapp, field judge Matt Edwards, side judge Michael Banks, back judge Perry Paganelli, replay official Jimmy Oldham, and replay assistant Roddy Ames.

Parry retired on April 1, 2019, accepting a position with ESPN to be the rules analyst for Monday Night Football. He worked at ESPN for five seasons before leaving for a job as an officiating liaison for the Buffalo Bills.

=== Notable games ===
Parry officiated Super Bowl XLI in 2007 as a side judge on the crew headed by referee Tony Corrente. Parry was the referee of Super Bowl XLVI, which was held February 5, 2012, at Lucas Oil Stadium in Indianapolis. Parry refereed his last NFL game and second NFL title game on February 3, 2019, in Super Bowl LIII at Mercedes-Benz Stadium in Atlanta.

In 2014, Parry worked a Patriots–Eagles preseason game with Maia Chaka. Chaka was a head linesman, now known as the down judge, becoming one of the first female NFL officials.

Parry was the referee of the 2015 Pro Bowl.

Parry's crew officiated the 2015 AFC wild card game between the Pittsburgh Steelers and the Cincinnati Bengals, which was filled with injuries and personal fouls on both sides, and which sportswriter Mike Freeman later called "one of the dirtiest and ugliest contests in the modern era of the sport".

== Personal life ==
Parry is a native of Michigan City, Indiana and a graduate of Michigan City Rogers High School. He is also an associate financial advisor for Ameriprise Financial in suburban Tallmadge. His father, Dave Parry, was the Supervisor of Officials for the Big Ten Conference and the side judge in Super Bowl XVII.
