= California Color Guard Circuit =

Winter guard competition circuit

The California Color Guard Circuit (CCGC) is one of the many winter guard circuits that are part of Winter Guard International (WGI).

== History ==
Established in 1964, the CCGC was started by six (6) charter members: Sacramento Capitolaires, Stockton Police Cadets, Raleys Raiders, Richmond Hawks, Praetorians, and the Rhythmettes. CCGC membership represents many scholastic programs and independent programs throughout Northern California and Nevada. In 2016, the circuit had just over sixty guard units and around sixteen percussion units. Evaluations are typically held in January; guard units are evaluated in the beginning of January, whereas percussion groups are evaluated towards the end of January. The typical season goes from January to the end of March or beginning of April. Shows are generally held in the San Francisco Bay area and the Sacramento area, though the circuit is based out of Santa Clara County. Each year CCGC holds its own championships and sends many groups to the world championships at WGI. CCGC is the proud home of many WGI medalists including:

- Abraham Lincoln High School;
- Amador Valley High School;
- Blue Devils;
- Clayton Valley High School;
- Dublin High School;
- Freelancers;
- In Motion Performance Ensemble.
- James Logan High School;
- Johansen High School;
- Rhapsody;
- San Jose Raiders;
- Santa Clara Vanguard; and
- Ventura;

== 2025 CCGC Color Guard Members ==
List of high schools and equivalent color guard groups who performed in Championship Guard and Percussion, Independence High School, San Jose, March 29, 2025:

Scholastic
Scholastic Middle School AA		Scholastic Middle School A	
Redwood Middle School Winter Guard	Saratoga	Cesar Chavez Middle School	Union City
California Crosspoint Academy MS	Hayward	IVC Middle School Color Guard	Union City
Junction Middle School	Livermore	Fisher Middle School	Los Gatos
Fallon Middle School-Cottonwood School Color Guard	Dublin	Wells Middle School	Dublin
Scholastic Regional AAA		Ida Price Middle School	San Jose
San Leandro High School	San Leandro	Benicia Middle School Color Guard	Benicia
Prospect High School Color Guard	Saratoga	Scholastic Regional AA	
Rancho San Juan Color Guard	Salinas	Mountain House Winter Guard	Mountain House
California Crosspoint Academy	Hayward	Oak Grove High School Color Guard	San Jose
Westmont High School Color Guard	San Jose	Sobrato High School Guard	Morgan Hill
Gilroy Unified	Gilroy	Will C Wood High School Color Guard	Vacaville
Hollister High School Color Guard	Hollister	Los Gatos High School Winter Guard	Los Gatos
Scholastic Regional A		Leigh High School Color Guard	San Jose
Concord High School Gold Color Guard	Concord	Scholastic National AA	
Independence High School Color Guard	San Jose	Mountain View High School Color Guard	Mountain View
Castro Valley Color Guard	Castro Valley	Santa Clara High School Color Guard	Santa Clara
Homestead High School Green Winter Guard	Cupertino	Santa Teresa High School Color Guard Varsity	San Jose
City of Livermore Guard	Livermore	Benicia High School Color Guard	Benicia
West Park JV	Roseville	Amador Valley High School JV Winter Guard	Pleasanton
Monta Vista JV	Cupertino	Lynbrook High School Color Guard	San Jose
Mission San Jose High School Winter Guard	Fremont	Concord High School Green Color Guard	Concord
Scholastic National A		Foothill High School Color Guard	Pleasanton
Saratoga High School Winter Guard Varsity	Saratoga	Dublin A	Dublin
Branham High School Color Guard	San Jose	Scholastic Open	
Homestead High School Mustang Winter Guard	Cupertino	James Logan Open	Union City
Monta Vista HS Varsity	Cupertino	Dublin High School Varsity Winterguard	Dublin
Cupertino High School	Cupertino	Amador Valley High School Varsity	Pleasanton
West Park HS	Roseville	Scholastic World	
Fremont High School Color Guard	Sunnyvale	Live Oak High School Color Guard	Morgan Hill
Granite Bay High School Color Guard	Granite Bay	James Logan Color Guard	Union City

Independent
Independent Regional A		Independent National A	
Immortalis Guard	Fremont	Sacramento State Winter Guard	Sacramento
Independent Open		Independent World	
Imperialis Color Guard	Fremont	In Motion Performance Ensemble	Fairfield

== 2025 CCGC Percussion Members ==
List of high schools and equivalent percussion groups who performed in Championship Guard and Percussion, Independence High School, San Jose, March 29, 2025:

Marching
Scholastic Regional A	
Emerald High School	Dublin
Scholastic A	
Los Gatos Percussion	Roseville
Fremont HS Indoor Percussion	Sunnyvale

Concert
Middle School	
Horner Middle School Percussion	Salinas

== Past Class Champions ==
=== Color Guard ===
Year	Independent				Scholastic								
Year	World	Open	National A	Regional A	World	Open	National		Regional			Middle School	
Year	World	Open	National A	Regional A	World	Open	A	AA	A	AA	AAA	A	AA
2025 3.29 (61)	In Motion Performance Ensemble -82.720	Imperialis Guard -77.500	Sacramento State Winter Guard -78.520	Immortalis Guard -72.950	James Logan Color Guard -88.200	Amador Valley High School Varsity -89.000	Fremont High School -87.290	Concord High School Green Color Guard -81.940	Mission San Jose High School Winter Guard -86.800	Leigh High School Color Guard -82.570	Westmont High School Color Guard -78.080	Ida Price Middle School -77.600	Fallon Middle School-Cottonwood School Color Guard -74.420
2024 4.6 (60)	In Motion Performance Ensemble -85.600	ZEUS Independent -87.600	Sacramento State Winter Guard -79.950	Immortalis Guard -72.440	Live Oak High School Color Guard -83.900	Dublin High School Varsity Winterguard-85.400	Amador Valley High School Varsity -90.430	Lynbrook High School Color Guard -83.610	South San Francisco High School Color Guard -91.870	Independence High School Color Guard -84.770	Vacaville High School Color Guard -82.650	IVC Middle School Color Guard -85.650	N/A
2023 (59)	In Motion Performance Ensemble -87.600	ZEUS Independent -84.500	Imperialis Guard -70.910	Immortalis Guard -69.240	James Logan Color Guard -83.800	Live Oak High School Color Guard-83.500	Amador Valley High School Varsity -87.700	Fremont High School Color Guard -82.380	Santa Clara High School Color Guard -87.390	City of Livermore Guard -84.330	Mountain View High School Color Guard -80.100	Cesar Chavez Middle School -76.460	N/A
2022 (58)	In Motion Performance Ensemble -85.900	N/A	Mare Island Color Guard (Sacramento) -75.270	Immortal Regiment Guard (Fremont) -63.880	James Logan Color Guard -82.500	Laguna Creek High School Guard: 86.900	Amador Valley High School Varsity -87.220	Morgan Hill Unified Varsity -79.550	South San Francisco High School Color Guard -83.740	Branham High School Color Guard -79.730	Capuchino High School Color Guard -71.430	Ida Price Middle School -79.440	N/A
2021 (57)	Season canceled												
2020 (56)	Championships canceled												
2019 (55)	In Motion Performance Ensemble -82.30	Tri-City -72.80	Spreckels -71.69	N/A	James Logan Color Guard -91.20	Saratoga High School Winter Guard Varsity -84.90	Live Oak High School Color Guard -86.54	N/A	Vanden High School -81.17	The Kings Academy -89.40	Irvington High School -86.04	Ida Price Middle School -74.90	N/A
2018 (54)	In Motion Performance Ensemble -85.60	Blue Devils -88.80	Eternal Regiment -61.19	N/A	James Logan Color Guard -94.40	Jesse Bethel High School -79.20	Laguna Creek High School Guard -87.84	N/A	West Campus Color Guard -79.08	Santa Clara High School Color Guard -83.34	N/A	Wells Middle School -67.51	N/A
2017 (53)	World	Open	National A	Regional A	World	Open	National		Regional		Middle School A		
2017 (53)	World	Open	National A	Regional A	World	Open	AA	A	AA	A	Middle School A		
2017 (53)	Infinitus -68.70	In Motion Performance Ensemble -89.40	Blue Devils -78.18	Tri-City -62.33	James Logan Color Guard -92.50	Oak Grove High School Color Guard-84.60	Granite Bay High School Color Guard -82.48	Dublin High School Varsity Winterguard-78.25	Monta Vista HS Winter Guard -83.31	N/A	Hogan Middle School: 69.66		
2016 (52)	Infinitus -68.10	Dynasty -68.20	In Motion Performance Ensemble -87.92	N/A	James Logan Color Guard World-90.70	Homestead High School -88.00	Armijo High School -85.56	Live Oak High School Color Guard-78.48	Westmont High school -76.59	West Campus High School -79.84	Falon Middle School -69.34		
2015 3.28 (51)	Infinitus -72.10	Dynasty -65.70	In Motion Performance Ensemble -80.72	Irvington -61.77	James Logan Color Guard World-90.60	Oak Grove High School Color Guard-82.30	Amador Valley High School A -84.48	Independence High School Color Guard -80.72	Gonzales High School -81.15	N/A	Ida Price Middle School -74.38		
2014 3.29 (50)	Santa Clara Vanguard -95.4	Dynasty -76.6	In Motion Performance Ensemble -82.88	Pleasanton Unified -66.83	James Logan Color Guard World -95.2	Oak Grove High School Color Guard-83.9	Vanden High School -88.20	Valley Christian -84.14	California High School -80.02	N/A	Cesar Chavez Middle School -77.12		
2013 4.6 (49)	Santa Clara Vanguard -93.2	N/A	Oak Grove Too -71.99	Pleasanton Unified -66.20	James Logan Color Guard World -92.7	James Logan Color Guard Open -83.3	Amador Valley High School A -85.78	Lynbrook High School -80.51	Santa Teresa High School -72.88	San Benito High School -76.12	N/A		
2012 3.31 (48)	Santa Clara Vanguard -94.7	Blue Devils -84.5	Tri Valley -79.9	Blue Devils -77.3	James Logan Color Guard World -95.3	Oak Grove High School Color Guard-83.9	Granite Bay High School -85.7	Gilroy High School -78.0	Fremont High School -79.5	Independence High School Color Guard -82.6	N/A		
2011 4.2 (47)	Santa Clara Vanguard -93.1	Blue Devils -82.3	Tri Valley -76.9	Blue Devils -80.1	James Logan Color Guard World -93.1	James Logan Color Guard Open -87.6	Jesse Bethel High School -87.5	Benicia Middle School -76.4	Kings Academy -80.9	N/A	N/A		
2010 4.3 (46)	Santa Clara Vanguard -96.0	Blue Devils -88.0	Tri Valley -74.7	N/A	James Logan Color Guard World -94.5	Homestead High School -87.2	Jesse Bethel High School -84.7	Alvarado -78.0	Benicia Middle School -83.8	N/A	N/A		
2009 3.28 (45)	Santa Clara Vanguard -95.2	Blue Devils -82.5	Of Essence -65.3	Tri Valley -80.5	James Logan Color Guard World -93.2	Oak Grove High School Color Guard-83.3	Homestead High School -86.6	San Benito A -77.8	San Benito B -76.1	N/A	N/A		
2008 4.5 (44)	Santa Clara Vanguard -93.1	Rhapsody -86.5	A2A -77.5	N/A	James Logan Color Guard World -95.1	Oak Grove High School Color Guard-84.6	Homestead High School -87.1	San Benito -75.0	Cesar Chavez Middle School -80.7	N/A	N/A		
2007 4.1 (43)	San Jose Raiders -95.3	Blue Devils -83.9	Rhapsody -92.1	N/A	James Logan Color Guard World -97.3	Fairfield High School -90.3	Homestead High School -89.8	San Benito -82.2	Cesar Chavez Middle School -84.3	N/A	N/A		
2006 4.1 (42)	Santa Clara Vanguard -91.0	San Jose Raiders -94.1	Rhapsody -?	Alvaradro Independent -78.6	James Logan Color Guard World -96.5	Oak Grove High School Color Guard-88.9	Homestead High School -?	Lynbrook High School -?	Evergreen Valley -80.3	N/A	N/A		

=== Percussion ===
Year	Independent			Scholastic					Concert		
Year	World	Open	A	World	Open	A	AA	Regional	Open	A	Middle School
Year	World	Open	A	World	Open	A	AA	A	Open	A	A
2025 3.29 (61)	N/A	N/A	N/A	N/A	N/A	Fremont HS Indoor Percussion: 79.500	N/A	Emerald High School: 70.200	N/A	N/A	Horner Middle School Percussion: 74.500
2024 4.6 (60)	N/A	N/A	N/A	James Logan Percussion: 86.200	N/A	Roakville Winter Percussion: 78.750	N/A	N/A	N/A	Price Charter Percussion: 85.900	Alisal Union School District Percussion: 66.000
2023 (59)	N/A	N/A	Forge Percussion: 79.200	N/A	N/A	Hollister High School Percussion: 82.200	N/A	N/A	Oak Grove High School Winter Percussion: 81.400	N/A	Horner Middle School Percussion: 81.000
2022 (58)	N/A	N/A	N/A	James Logan Percussion: 90.900	Santa Teresa High School Percussion Ensemble 77.850	Mountain View High School Percussion: 86.350	South San Francisco Percussion: 79.600	N/A	Monta Vista High School Concert: 80.000	Price Charter Percussion: 84.500	Horner Middle School Percussion: 79.200
2021 (57)	Championships canceled										
2020 (56)	Championships canceled										
2019 (55)	N/A	N/A	Tri City: 76.600	N/A	Oak Grove: 83.400	Fremont: 83.900	N/A	Hogan -71.300	Price Charter: 84.900	Takay: 77.000	Horner: 78.400
2018 (54)	N/A	N/A	N/A	N/A	Oak Grove: 84.000	Irvington: 86.050	N/A	Hogan -72.150	Price Charter: 87.400	Fremont: 84.500	N/A
2017 (53)	Missing?										
2016 (52)	Independent			Scholastic					Concert		
2016 (52)	World	Open	A	World	Open	A	AA	Regional A	World	Open	A
2016 (52)	N/A	Team Percussion: 72.150	N/A	N/A	Jesse Bethel: 74.100	Fremont: 89.750	N/A	Fallon: 68.300	N/A	Price Charter: 91.300	Horner: 80.200
2015 3.28 (51)	N/A	Team Percussion: 81.000	N/A	N/A	Vanden: 83.800	Irvington: 83.100	Oak Grove: 88.150	Fallon: 73.100	N/A	Price Charter: 95.500	San Benito: 82.600
2014 3.29 (50)	N/A	Team Percussion: 85.550	N/A	Leigh: 80.850	Jesse Bethel: 82.000	Vanden: 87.850	N/A	Fallon: 71.250	N/A	Price Charter: 85.800	Mt. Eden: 85.300
2013 4.6 (49)	N/A	N/A	Team Percussion USA: 78.45	N/A	Leigh: 87.750	Branham: 81.950	Fremont: 87.200	N/A	N/A	Price Charter: 88.600	Horner: 79.900
2012 3.31 (48)	Santa Clara Vanguard: 88.650	N/A	Fallon: 71.950	N/A	Amador Valley: 89.400	Fremont: 88.400	Mountain View: 91.400	N/A	N/A	Ida Prince Charter: 89.500	Horner: 79.500
2011 4.2 (47)	N/A	Santa Clara Vanguard: 88.250	N/A	Logan: 89.600	Jesse Bethel: 83.750	Mountain View: 85.950	N/A	N/A	Logan Concert: 90.95	Price Charter: 86.900	Monta Vista: 80.900
2010 4.3 (46)	N/A	Vanguard Cadets: 89.500	Hogan: 79.300	Homestead: 88.900	Jesse Bethel: 91.150	Leigh: 92.350	N/A	N/A	N/A	Ida Prince Charter: 87.100	Irvington: 78.300
2009 3.28 (45)	N/A	N/A	Hogan: 81.850	Logan: 90.800	Jesse Bethel: 85.200	Mt. Eden: 78.400	N/A	N/A	N/A	Morgan Hill: 84.100	Horner: 77.100
2008 4.5 (44)	N/A	N/A	N/A	N/A	Amador Valley: 84.700	Hogan: 86.300	N/A	N/A	N/A	N/A	Horner: 79.600
2007 4.1 (43)	Freelancers: 91.900	Summit: 77.400	Hogan: 78.200	Logan: 88.500	Leigh: 87.800	Evergreen Valley: 85.000	N/A	N/A	N/A	N/A	Horner: 72.800

== WGI Medalists from CCGC ==
=== Color Guard ===
- Abraham Lincoln High School
  - Scholastic A Gold: 1988
- Blue Devils
  - Independent World Gold: 1995, 1996, 1997, 1998
  - Independent Open Silver: 2004
  - Independent Open Bronze: 2001
- Dublin High School
  - Scholastic A Bronze: 1989
- In Motion
  - Independent Open Silver: 2006, 2017
  - Independent A Silver: 2005, 2016
- James Logan High School
  - Scholastic World Gold: 1998*tie, 1999, 2000, 2001, 2002, 2003, 2004, 2005, 2006, 2007, 2010
  - Scholastic World Silver: 2009, 2011, 2012
  - Scholastic World Bronze: 1997, 2014, 2015, 2017
  - Dance Team Gold: 1995
- Rhapsody
  - Independent A Bronze: 2007
- San Jose Raiders
  - Independent World Gold: 1990*tie, 1991, 1992, 1993, 1994, 2003
  - Independent World Silver: 2005
  - Independent A Silver: 1997
  - Independent Open Bronze: 1994
- Santa Clara Vanguard
  - Independent World Gold: 2009, 2011, 2015
  - Independent World Silver: 2010, 2012, 2014, 2016
  - Independent World Bronze: 2013
- Ventura
  - Independent A Bronze: 1999

=== Percussion ===
- Amador Valley High School
  - Scholastic Concert Silver: 1997
- Clayton Valley High SChool
  - Scholastic A Gold: 1997
- Freelancers
  - Independent World Silver: 2000
  - Independent World Bronze: 1999, 2001
  - Independent Open Gold: 1998
- James Logan High School
  - Scholastic Concert World Gold: 2011, 2013
  - Scholastic Concert World Bronze: 2015
- Johansen High School
  - Scholastic A Gold: 1998
- Santa Clara Vanguard
  - Independent Open Gold: 2011

== Executive board ==
As of October 2025

- President: Jamie Hjeltness
- Vice President: Jubilee Hardwick
- Treasurer: Shawn Gongwer
- Secretary: Russell Crow
- Contest Coordinator(s): Jubilee Hardwick, Shawn Gongwer
- Members at large: Wes Adams, Rebekah Mendoza, Alphonso Pitco, Aidan Marquez
- Middle School Guard Liaisons: Catherine Lorigan
- Regional A-World Class Guards Liaisons: Noah Bishop-Peters

== Notes ==
^1 City of Livermore Guard is a unified winter guard with members from Livermore High School and Granada High School
