= Michael Freeman =

Michael or Mike Freeman may refer to:

- Michael Freeman (surgeon) (1931–2017), British orthopaedic surgeon
- Mike Freeman (bobsleigh) (1937–2007), British Olympic bobsledder
- Mike Freeman (defensive back) (born 1944), American football defensive back
- Michael Freeman (photographer) (born 1945), British photographer and author
- Michael J. Freeman (born 1947), American inventor
- Michael O. Freeman (born 1948), Minnesota attorney and politician
- Mike Freeman (jazz musician) (born 1959), American vibraphonist and composer
- Michael Freeman (chess player) (born 1960), New Zealand chess player
- Mike Freeman (guard) (born 1961), American football player
- Mike Freeman (columnist), American sports columnist
- Mike Freeman (baseball) (born 1987), American baseball player

== See also ==
- Michael Freedman (disambiguation)
- Michael Friedman (disambiguation)
