= Michael Freedman (disambiguation) =

Michael Freedman (born 1951) is an American mathematician.

Michael Freedman may also refer to:

- Michael Freedman (Society of Guardians) (1929–1996), Australian mystic
- Michael J. Freedman, American computer scientist
- Mike Freedman, American television cameraman

== See also ==
- Michael Freeman (disambiguation)
- Michael Friedman (disambiguation)
- Mikhail Fridman (born 1964), Russian businessman
