= San Jose Raiders =

Winter guard ensembles in San Jose, California

The San Jose Raiders are a group of winter guard ensembles based in San Jose, California and founded in the 1970s. The Raiders had won six Winter Guard International (WGI) World Titles (1990, 1991, 1992, 1993, 1994, 2003).

== History ==
Founded as a Drum and Bugle Corps, the San Jose Raiders were first known as the Knight Raiders. In the mid 1970s, the organization switched its focus to Winter Guard and made its first WGI appearance in 1985.

By 1987 the Raiders made their first finals appearance with their show entitled "The Art of Noise" and by 1990 had tied with Blessed Sacrament to win their first WGI title. In the subsequent seasons the San Jose Raiders became the first color guard to win five consecutive WGI World Class titles. Additionally in 1994 the San Jose Raiders Open Guard earned the bronze medal at the WGI World Championships.

In 1995 the organization decided to fold their current world program and promote their Open Guard to the World class. Although this "new" Raider World Guard performed a very memorable show, they missed making finals. In 1996 the Raiders returned to WGI and firmly retained their spot as a WGI finalist with a 6th-place finish.

The following years continued the Raiders growth. The Raiders "A" class guard earned a silver medal in 1997 and followed it with a 4th-place finish in the Open class in 1998. The World team remained strong, but was never able to return to the medal podium, twice missing the bronze medal by five hundredths of a point (2000, 2002).

After eight years the Raiders returned to the World Class Podium with their 2003 Gold medal production, "Portraits of Frida".

== See also ==
- California Color Guard Circuit
