= Michael Friedman (photographer) =

American photographer and author (born 1943)

- Born: May 3, 1943 (age 82); Bridgeport, Connecticut, U.S.
- Occupation(s): Music manager and producer
- Years active: 1966-1982
- Spouse: Donna Vita (m. 1997)
- Website: https://www.michaelfriedmanphotography.com

Michael A. Friedman (born May 3, 1943) is a former music manager and producer, photographer and author.

== Career ==
From 1966 to 1982, Friedman was a music publicist, artist manager, music producer and amateur photographer. He was a publicist for the Mamas and Papas, Glen Campbell, Herman’s Hermits, The Hollies, The Turtles, and The Bee Gees. He then managed an unknown Todd Rundgren and his first band Nazz, producing the first “Hello it's Me” at the age of 24. In 1968, Friedman went to work Albert Grossman and helped run Grossman’s management firm ABGM in New York. At ABGM, Michael worked with Bob Dylan, The Band, Janis Joplin, Paul Butterfield, Odetta, Ian and Sylvia, Ritchie Havens, Peter Paul and Mary, James Cotton, Todd Rundgren, Professor Longhair, Tom Rush, and Gordon Lightfoot.

In the 1970s, Friedman moved to Woodstock, NY, to help establish Grossman’s Bearsville Records and Bearsville Studios, signing several of Bearsville’s first artists and producing some of Bearsville's first albums: Todd Rundgren - Runt, American Dream, Jesse Frederick and Hungry Chuck. He subsequently joined Bert Block in Connecticut, managing Kris Kristofferson and Rita Coolidge. In 1980, Friedman joined Arista Records to work with Clive Davis as his executive assistant, and led Arista's new music video department. His first two projects under the newly established division included "Dionne Warwick: Live in Las Vegas,” and the 1980 production of One for the Road (The Kinks album) filmed at the Providence Civic Center, which was the first feature length music video. These productions were joint ventures with Time Life Entertainment. The Kinks rock video marked an industry first, and the soundtrack resulted in the Arista double album, “One for the Road,” which went gold. Friedman also oversaw all Arista distributed labels, including Dave Grusin’s and Larry Rosen’s Jazz label GRP Records.

Between 1969 and 1973, Friedman took over 2,000 photos of the musicians he worked with, both onstage and backstage. The photo negatives were lost before they were printed, and found again in 2017. The since published photos include The Band, Janis Joplin, The Rolling Stones, Kris Kristofferson and Rita Coolidge, Paul Butterfield, Todd Rundgren, and other artists. Friedman's photographs have been the center of exhibits at the California Heritage Museum in Los Angeles, RE Hotel in Phoenix, and a year-long exhibit at the Rock and Roll Hall of Fame in Cleveland. The Rock and Roll Hall of Fame will be archiving his photographs in perpetuity as The Michael Friedman Collection.

Friedman later went on to form The Empire Project, a music production and management firm in New York. In the early 1980s, Friedman opened Friedman Gallery, a high end antique & design gallery, and Artafax, a European high tech design store, both in Westport, Connecticut. In 1992, he opened the Ash Creek Saloon, the first of his three restaurants. Also in 1992, Friedman authored, "Cowboy Culture, The Last Frontier of American Antiques".

In 2023, Friedman and Donna Vita published a fine art photography book, "EXPOSED: Lost Negatives & Untold Stories of Michael Friedman."

== Personal life ==
Friedman grew up in Westport, Connecticut. In the mid-'50s, he formed the first rock band in his hometown and played as a drummer. In 1961, Friedman graduated Staples High School in Westport, Connecticut. He graduated from the University of Arizona in 1965.

Friedman has three daughters and lives with his wife, Donna Vita, in Connecticut.
