= Jesse M. Bethel High School =

High school in California, United States

Coordinates: 38.1205°N 122.2044°W

Location
- 1800 Ascot Parkway; Vallejo, (Solano County), California 94591; United States

Information
- Type: Public high school
- School district: Vallejo Unified School District
- Principal: Rasheena Bell Fesseha
- Staff: 66.75 (FTE)
- Enrollment: 1,441 (2023-2024)
- Student to teacher ratio: 21.59
- Colors: Old gold and black
- Nickname: Jaguars

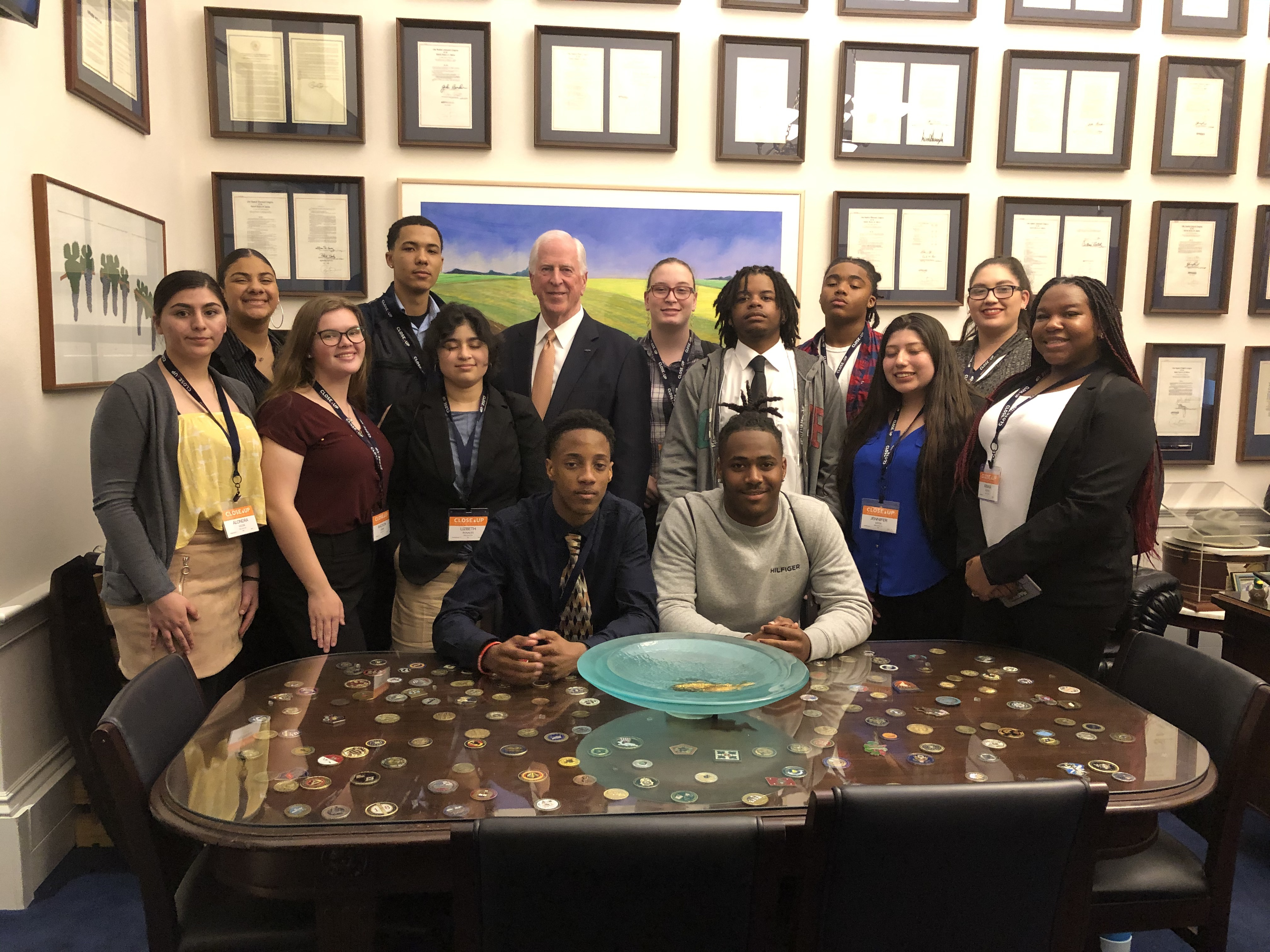
Students from Jesse M. Bethel High School visiting Congressman Mike Thompson in Washington, D.C., in 2020.

Jesse M. Bethel High School is a high school located in Vallejo, California. It is part of the Vallejo City Unified School District. The school opened in the Fall of 1998, with only two student body classes. It is located on 1800 Ascot Pkwy and serves the east side of Vallejo (to the right of Interstate 80).

== History ==
Founded by Jesse M. Bethel in 1998.

On May 14, 2015, Max Rusk, a student at the school, 17, was shot dead outside the school during late morning hours while on a trail. He was shot during a robbery which resulted in two non-student suspects arrested. The two were sentenced in 2021 to manslaughter.
