= Mike Freeman (columnist) =

American sports columnist

Mike Freeman is an American sports columnist for USA Today.

== Career ==
Freeman has written for Bleacher Report, The New York Times, Washington Post, Dallas Morning News, Boston Globe, Florida Times-Union and CBSSports.com. He is also the author of five books, including a biography on Florida State football coach Bobby Bowden. His book ESPN: The Uncensored History, which alleged sexual harassment, drug use and gambling, was the first critical study of ESPN.

In January 2004, Freeman resigned before starting a columnist job at The Indianapolis Star after he was discovered lying about his education, specifically falsely claiming a college degree. Tom Jolly, sports editor at The New York Times, said "Mike's career here speaks for itself, he did some great work here". Freeman subsequently said "There are no excuses and I have never made any. Never will either. I’ll get my degree this summer or fall and start my pursuit of an advanced degree the following spring."

Freeman's columns have included accusations of racism and sexism against his colleagues in the New York press. His columns are often seen as far-left and anti-religious. He was unsuccessfully sued for libel by golfer John Daly, with a circuit judge ruling that "Freeman's statements were either true or constitutionally protected opinion". In 2002 Freeman called for a tougher program from the National Football League for monitoring off-the-field violence and drug use. As of 2023 he is a columnist in USA Today.

In addition to his journalism career, he has authored multiple books, such as Jim Brown: The Fierce Life of an American Hero, exploring the life of the NFL legend, and You Negotiate Like a Girl: Reflections on a Career in the NFL, co-written with Amy Trask.

His work often is racially charged and met occasionally with accusations of racism. In 2007 he wrote an article for CBS Sports mocking a potential matchup between West Virginia and Missouri in the College Football National Championship game calling it the "Hicks versus the Heehaws." A petition demanding his firing collected over 3000 responses, another petition was created while he worked at Bleacher Report garnered over 200 responses.

== Personal life ==
Freeman is Catholic.
