= 2015 New England Patriots season =

56th season in franchise history

- Owner: Robert Kraft
- General manager: Bill Belichick
- Head coach: Bill Belichick
- Offensive coordinator: Josh McDaniels
- Defensive coordinator: Matt Patricia
- Home stadium: Gillette Stadium

Results
- Record: 12–4
- Division place: 1st AFC East
- Playoffs: Won Divisional Playoffs (vs. Chiefs) 27–20; Lost AFC Championship (at Broncos) 18–20
- All-Pros: 3: TE Rob Gronkowski (1st team); K Stephen Gostkowski (1st team); OLB Jamie Collins (2nd team)
- Pro Bowlers: 7: QB Tom Brady; TE Rob Gronkowski; DE Chandler Jones; OLB Jamie Collins; CB Malcolm Butler; K Stephen Gostkowski; ST Matthew Slater

Uniform
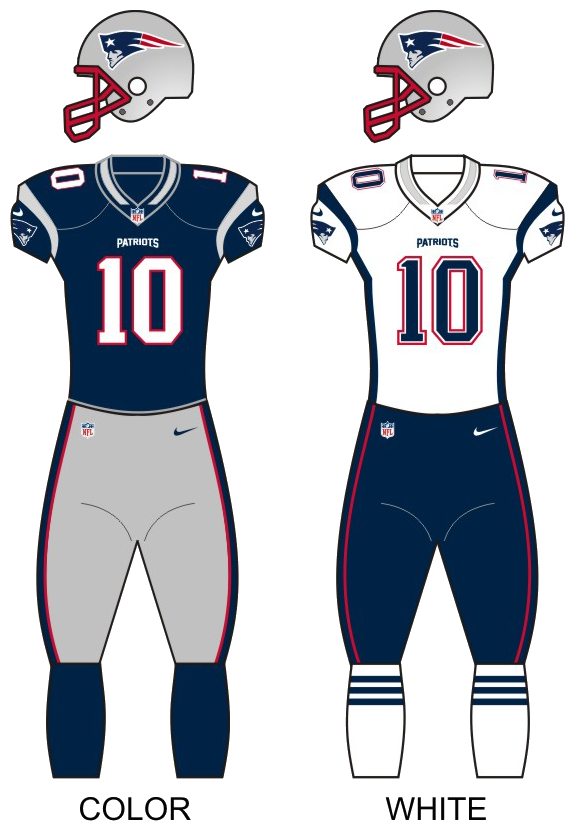

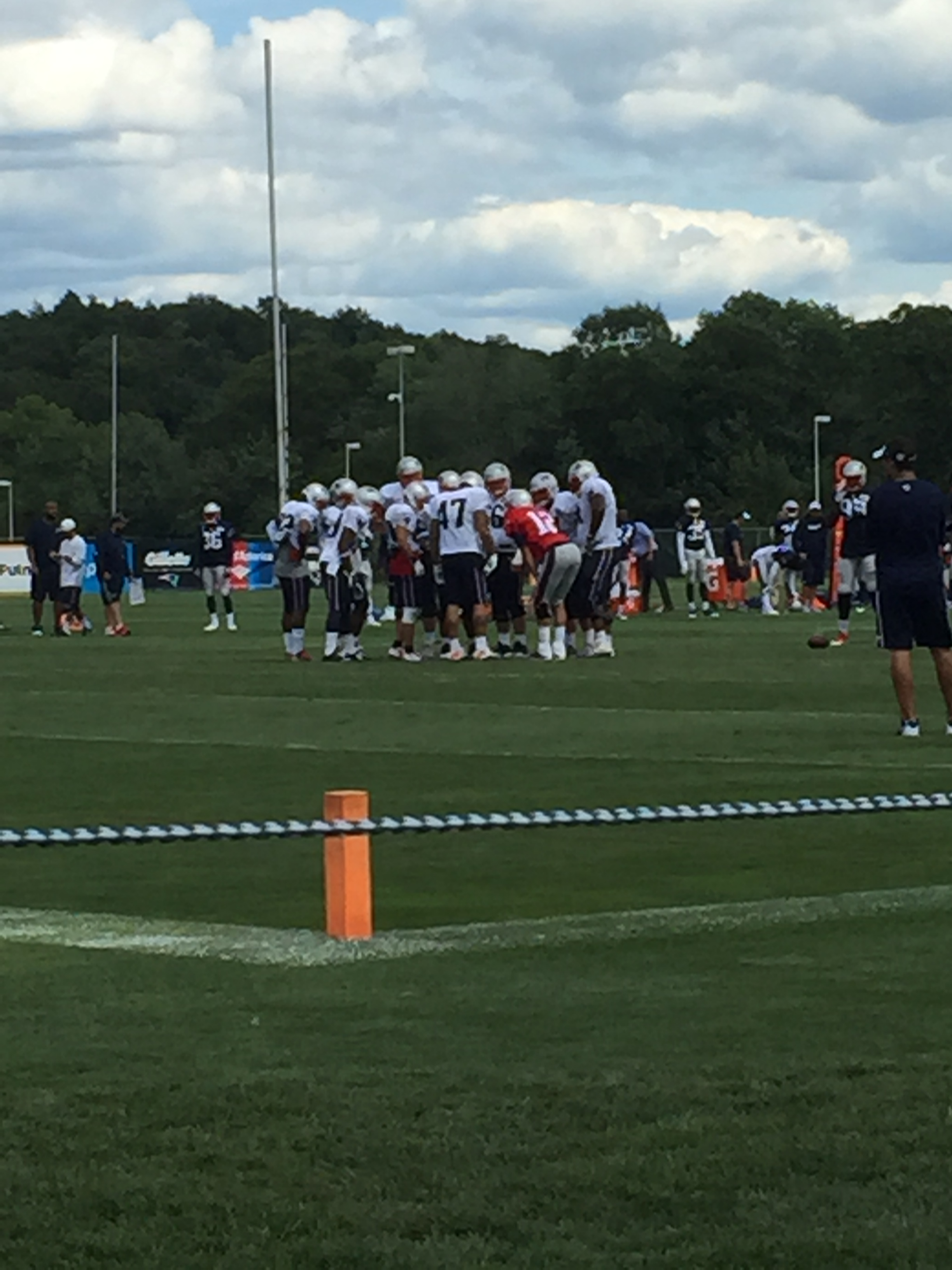
Tom Brady gets in the huddle at the 2015 Patriots Training Camp

The 2015 season was the New England Patriots' 46th in the National Football League (NFL), their 56th overall and their 16th under head coach Bill Belichick. The Patriots entered the season as the defending Super Bowl champions.

After going 10–0 to begin the season, the Patriots' first loss came against the Denver Broncos in overtime in Week 12. They would go on to lose four of their last six games, ultimately finishing the regular season with a 12–4 record for the fourth straight year. In Week 14, the Patriots clinched their seventh straight AFC East division title. By this, the Patriots tied the 1979 Los Angeles Rams for most consecutive division titles. As the second seeded team in the AFC, they secured a first-round bye for the playoffs and home-field advantage for their first playoff game.

In the divisional round of the playoffs, the Patriots defeated the Kansas City Chiefs 27–20 to advance to the AFC Championship for the fifth straight year, where they fell on the road to the eventual Super Bowl 50 champion Denver Broncos 20–18. The Carolina Panthers were also close to rematching the Patriots in the Super Bowl for the first time in 12 years.

== Roster changes ==
=== Free agency ===
- Notable departures: Akeem Ayers, Brandon Browner, Jonas Gray, Darrelle Revis, Stevan Ridley, Shane Vereen, Vince Wilfork.
- Notable additions: Scott Chandler, Jabaal Sheard, Dion Lewis.

=== 2015 draft class ===
2015 New England Patriots Draft
Round	Selection	Player	Position	College
1	32	Malcom Brown	DT	Texas
2	64	Jordan Richards	SS	Stanford
3	97	Geneo Grissom	DE	Oklahoma
4	101	Trey Flowers	DE	Arkansas
4	111	Tre' Jackson	G	Florida State
4	131	Shaq Mason	G	Georgia Tech
5	166	Joe Cardona	LS	Navy
6	178	Matthew Wells	LB	Mississippi St.
6	202	A. J. Derby	TE	Arkansas
7	247	Darryl Roberts	CB	Marshall
7	253	Xzavier Dickson	LB	Alabama

Compensatory selection

Notes

- The Patriots traded guard Logan Mankins and their fifth-round selection (No. 168 overall) to the Tampa Bay Buccaneers in exchange for tight end Tim Wright and the Buccaneers' fourth- and sixth-round selections (Nos. 101 and 178 overall, respectively).
- The Patriots traded their sixth-round selection (No. 208 overall) to the Tennessee Titans in exchange for the Titans' seventh-round selection (No. 219 overall) and linebacker Akeem Ayers.
- The Patriots traded their original seventh-round selection (No. 249 overall) to the St. Louis Rams in exchange for wide receiver Greg Salas.
- The Patriots traded their third- and seventh-round selections (Nos. 96 and 219 overall, respectively) to the Cleveland Browns in exchange for their fourth-, fifth- and sixth-round selections (Nos. 111, 147 and 202 overall, respectively).
- The Patriots subsequently traded the fifth-round selection (No. 147 overall), gained from an earlier trade with the Cleveland Browns, to the Green Bay Packers in exchange for their fifth- and seventh-round picks (Nos. 166 and 247, respectively).

=== Undrafted free agents ===
Position	Player	College
Center	David Andrews	Georgia
Safety	Brandon King	Auburn

Made regular season roster

== Staff ==
2015 New England Patriots staff
Front office: Chairman/CEO – Robert Kraft; President – Jonathan Kraft; General manager – Bill Belichick; Director of player personnel – Nick Caserio; Director of college scouting – Monti Ossenfort; Director of scouting administration – Nancy Meier; Assistant director of pro scouting – Dave Ziegler; Football research director – Ernie Adams; Assistant to the coaching staff – Michael Lombardi; Head coaches: Head coach – Bill Belichick; Offensive coaches: Offensive coordinator/quarterbacks – Josh McDaniels; Running backs – Ivan Fears; Wide receivers – Chad O'Shea; Tight ends – Brian Daboll; Offensive line – Dave DeGuglielmo; Coaching assistant – Nick Caley; Coaching Assistant – Jerry Schuplinski	Defensive coaches: Defensive coordinator – Matt Patricia; Defensive line – Brendan Daly; Linebackers – Patrick Graham; Cornerbacks – Josh Boyer; Safeties – Brian Flores; Coaching assistant – Steve Belichick; Special teams coaches: Special teams – Joe Judge; Assistant special teams – Ray Ventrone; Strength and conditioning: Strength and conditioning – Harold Nash; Assistant strength and conditioning – Moses Cabrera

== Final roster ==
2015 New England Patriots roster
Quarterbacks (QB): 12 Tom Brady; 10 Jimmy Garoppolo; Running backs (RB): 38 Brandon Bolden; 39 Steven Jackson; 28 James White; Wide receivers (WR): 80 Danny Amendola PR; 11 Julian Edelman; 14 Chris Harper; 19 Brandon LaFell; 82 Keshawn Martin KR; 18 Matthew Slater; Tight ends (TE): 88 Scott Chandler; 87 Rob Gronkowski; 85 Michael Williams	Offensive linemen (OL): 60 David Andrews C; 61 Marcus Cannon T; 71 Cameron Fleming T; 63 Tre' Jackson G; 67 Josh Kline G; 69 Shaq Mason G; 66 Bryan Stork; 76 Sebastian Vollmer T; 68 LaAdrian Waddle T; Defensive linemen (DL): 97 Alan Branch DT; 90 Malcom Brown DT; 92 Geneo Grissom DE; 72 Akiem Hicks DT; 95 Chandler Jones DE; 70 Ishmaa'ily Kitchen DT; 50 Rob Ninkovich DE; 93 Jabaal Sheard DE; 96 Sealver Siliga DT	Linebackers (LB): 58 Jon Bostic OLB; 91 Jamie Collins OLB; 53 Darius Fleming OLB; 55 Jonathan Freeny OLB; 54 Dont'a Hightower OLB; 45 Kevin Snyder MLB; 52 Dekoda Watson OLB; Defensive backs (DB): 21 Malcolm Butler CB; 23 Patrick Chung SS; 22 Justin Coleman CB; 43 Nate Ebner SS; 30 Duron Harmon SS; 34 Leonard Johnson CB; 36 Brandon King SS; 32 Devin McCourty FS; 37 Jordan Richards FS; 26 Logan Ryan CB; 27 Tavon Wilson FS; Special teams (ST): 6 Ryan Allen P; 49 Joe Cardona LS; 3 Stephen Gostkowski K	Practice squad: 31 Montee Ball RB; 64 Chris Barker G; 83 DeAndre Carter WR; 47 Joey Iosefa FB; 24 Rashaan Melvin CB; 74 Keavon Milton T; 41 Cedric Thompson FS; 35 Brock Vereen FS; -- J.J. Worton WR; Reserve: 29 LeGarrette Blount RB (IR); -- Josh Boyce WR (IR); 25 Tarell Brown CB (IR); 86 A. J. Derby TE (IR); 46 James Develin FB (IR); 17 Aaron Dobson WR (IR); 99 Dominique Easley DT (IR); 52 Dane Fletcher MLB (PUP); 98 Trey Flowers DE (IR); 36 Tyler Gaffney RB (IR); 13 Brandon Gibson WR (IR); -- Kevin Hughes T (IR); 59 Rufus Johnson DE (NF-Ill.); 94 Chris Jones DT (PUP); 33 Dion Lewis RB (IR); 59 Eric Martin OLB (IR); 51 Jerod Mayo MLB (IR); 28 Darryl Roberts CB (IR); 77 Nate Solder T (IR); 84 Brian Tyms WR (IR); 62 Ryan Wendell C (IR); Rookies in italics 53 active, 21 reserve, 9 practice squad

== Schedule ==
=== Preseason ===
Week	Date	Opponent	Result	Record	Venue	Recap
1	August 13	Green Bay Packers	**L** 11–22	0–1	Gillette Stadium	Recap
2	August 22	at New Orleans Saints	**W** 26–24	1–1	Mercedes-Benz Superdome	Recap
3	August 28	at Carolina Panthers	**W** 17–16	2–1	Bank of America Stadium	Recap
4	September 3	New York Giants	**L** 9–12	2–2	Gillette Stadium	Recap

=== Regular season ===
Week	Date	Opponent	Result	Record	Venue	Recap
1	September 10	Pittsburgh Steelers	**W** 28–21	1–0	Gillette Stadium	Recap
2	September 20	at **Buffalo Bills**	**W** 40–32	2–0	Ralph Wilson Stadium	Recap
3	September 27	Jacksonville Jaguars	**W** 51–17	3–0	Gillette Stadium	Recap
4	Bye					
5	October 11	at Dallas Cowboys	**W** 30–6	4–0	AT&T Stadium	Recap
6	October 18	at Indianapolis Colts	**W** 34–27	5–0	Lucas Oil Stadium	Recap
7	October 25	**New York Jets**	**W** 30–23	6–0	Gillette Stadium	Recap
8	October 29	**Miami Dolphins**	**W** 36–7	7–0	Gillette Stadium	Recap
9	November 8	Washington Redskins	**W** 27–10	8–0	Gillette Stadium	Recap
10	November 15	at New York Giants	**W** 27–26	9–0	MetLife Stadium	Recap
11	November 23	**Buffalo Bills**	**W** 20–13	10–0	Gillette Stadium	Recap
12	November 29	at Denver Broncos	**L** 24–30 (OT)	10–1	Sports Authority Field at Mile High	Recap
13	December 6	Philadelphia Eagles	**L** 28–35	10–2	Gillette Stadium	Recap
14	December 13	at Houston Texans	**W** 27–6	11–2	NRG Stadium	Recap
15	December 20	Tennessee Titans	**W** 33–16	12–2	Gillette Stadium	Recap
16	December 27	at **New York Jets**	**L** 20–26 (OT)	12–3	MetLife Stadium	Recap
17	January 3	at **Miami Dolphins**	**L** 10–20	12–4	Sun Life Stadium	Recap

Note: Intra-division opponents are in bold text.

=== Postseason ===
Week	Date	Opponent	Result	Record	Venue	Recap
Wild Card	First-round bye					
Divisional	January 16, 2016	Kansas City Chiefs (5)	**W** 27–20	1–0	Gillette Stadium	Recap
AFC Championship	January 24, 2016	at Denver Broncos (1)	**L** 18–20	1–1	Sports Authority Field at Mile High	Recap

== Game summaries ==
=== Regular season ===
==== Week 1: vs. Pittsburgh Steelers ====
NFL Kickoff game

Week One: Pittsburgh Steelers at New England Patriots – Game summary

Quarter	1	2	3	4	Total
Steelers	0	3	8	10	21
Patriots	0	14	7	7	28

at Gillette Stadium, Foxborough, Massachusetts

- Date: September 10
- Game time: 8:30 p.m. EDT
- Game weather: 65 °F (18 °C), rainy and cool
- Game attendance: 66,829
- Referee: Carl Cheffers
- TV announcers (NBC): Al Michaels (play-by-play), Cris Collinsworth (color commentator) and Michele Tafoya (sideline reporter)
- Recap, Gamebook

Game information

First quarter

- No scoring plays

Second quarter

- NE – Rob Gronkowski 16-yard pass from Tom Brady, (Stephen Gostkowski kick), 11:11. Patriots 7–0. Drive: 13 plays, 90 yards, 7:03.
- NE – Rob Gronkowski 6-yard pass from Tom Brady, (Stephen Gostkowski kick), 4:01. Patriots 14–0. Drive: 9 plays, 64 yards, 4:37.
- PIT – Josh Scobee 44-yard field goal, 0:03. Patriots 14–3. Drive: 11 plays, 57 yards, 3:58.

Third quarter

- NE – Scott Chandler 1-yard pass from Tom Brady, (Stephen Gostkowski kick), 10:37. Patriots 21–3. Drive: 9 plays, 80 yards, 4:23.
- PIT– Will Johnson 1-yard run, (Ben Roethlisberger–Markus Wheaton pass), 6:43. Patriots 21–11. Drive: 7 plays, 80 yards, 3:54.

Fourth quarter

- PIT – Josh Scobee 24-yard field goal, 11:39. Patriots 21–14. Drive: 13 plays, 67 yards, 7:36.
- NE – Rob Gronkowski 1-yard pass from Tom Brady, (Stephen Gostkowski kick), 9:20. Patriots 28–14. Drive: 7 plays, 79 yards, 2:19.
- PIT– Antonio Brown 11-yard pass from Ben Roethlisberger, (Josh Scobee kick), 0:02. Patriots 28–21. Drive: 12 plays, 70 yards, 2:57.

Top passers

- PIT – Ben Roethlisberger – 26/38, 351 yards, TD, INT
- NE – Tom Brady – 25/32, 288 yards, 4 TD

Top rushers

- PIT – DeAngelo Williams – 21 rushes, 127 yards
- NE – Dion Lewis – 15 rushes, 69 yards

Top receivers

- PIT – Antonio Brown – 9 receptions, 133 yards, TD
- NE – Julian Edelman – 11 receptions, 97 yards

Top tacklers

- PIT – Will Allen – 8 tackles, sack
- NE – Dont'a Hightower – 6 tackles, sack

The Patriots played the Steelers on opening night, celebrating their Super Bowl victory from the season before.

On the opening possession of the game, the Steelers drove all the way to the Patriots 26, but Josh Scobee missed a 44-yard field goal attempt. After the next two drives ended in punts, the Patriots engineered a 13 play, 90-yard marathon, lasting over seven minutes with Tom Brady hitting his go-to target Rob Gronkowski for a 16-yard touchdown and the early 7–0 lead. The Steelers once again drove deep into Patriots territory, but Scobee missed a 46-yard field goal wide right. The Patriots made the Steelers pay, driving 64 yards in 9 plays, scoring on Brady's 6-yard touchdown pass to Gronkowski, increasing the lead to 14–0. The Steelers finally responded driving back to the 26, but this time Scobee was good from 44-yards away and the Patriots led 14–3 at halftime. The Patriots offense continued with their first half pace, producing a second half opening drive of nine plays, 80-yards, finishing with Brady throwing a 1-yard touchdown pass to new acquisition, tight end Scott Chandler, widening the Patriots lead to 21–3. The Steelers countered with an 80-yard, 7 play drive, with Will Johnson scoring on a 1-yard touchdown run, and Ben Roethlisberger converting the two-point conversion on a pass to Markus Wheaton, trimming the deficit to 21–11. After a Patriots three-and-out, the Steelers marched 67 yards to the Patriots 1-yard line, but a penalty pushed them back to the 5 and DeAngelo Williams was stuffed for a loss bringing up 4th-down and Scobee converted the 24-yard field goal to make the score 21–14. The Patriots countered, aided by a 52-yard catch by Gronkowski, marching 79 yards in 7 plays, scoring on a 1-yard touchdown catch by Gronkowski, extending the lead the 28–14. Three possessions later, Roethlisberger was intercepted at the Patriots 7. After a Patriots punt, the Steelers raced 70 yards in 12 plays, scoring on an 11-yard touchdown pass to Antonio Brown with just :02 seconds left, trimming the deficit to 28–21. Gronkowski ended his superb night by falling on the subsequent Steelers onside kick attempt, ending the game.

==== Week 2: at Buffalo Bills ====
Week Two: New England Patriots at Buffalo Bills – Game summary

Quarter	1	2	3	4	Total
Patriots	14	10	13	3	40
Bills	7	6	0	19	32

at Ralph Wilson Stadium, Orchard Park, New York

- Date: September 20
- Game time: 1:00 p.m. EDT
- Game weather: 62 °F (17 °C), sunny, some clouds
- Game attendance: 70,858
- Referee: Ronald Torbert
- TV announcers (CBS): Kevin Harlan (play-by-play) and Rich Gannon (color commentator)
- Recap, Gamebook

Game information

First quarter

- BUF – Karlos Williams 2-yard run (Dan Carpenter kick), 10:00. Bills 7–0. Drive: 10 plays, 80 yards, 5:00.
- NE – Julian Edelman 8-yard pass from Tom Brady, (Stephen Gostkowski kick), 4:02. tied 7–7. Drive: 5 plays, 62 yards, 2:30.
- NE – Dion Lewis 6-yard run (Stephen Gostkowski kick), 0:58. Patriots 14–7. Drive: 2 plays, 13 yards, 0:31.

Second quarter

- NE – Rob Gronkowski 2-yard pass from Tom Brady, (Stephen Gostkowski kick), 13:14. Patriots 21–7. Drive: 5 plays, 30 yards, 1:36.
- BUF – Charles Clay 9-yard pass from Tyrod Taylor, (Dan Carpenter kick failed), 5:13. Patriots 21–13. Drive: 2 plays, 48 yards, 1:25.
- NE – Stephen Gostkowski 46-yard field goal, 2:18. Patriots 24–13. Drive: 9 plays, 52 yards, 2:55.

Third quarter

- NE – Stephen Gostkowski 21-yard field goal, 10:02. Patriots 27–13. Drive: 12 plays, 77 yards, 4:58.
- NE – Julian Edelman 22-yard pass from Tom Brady, (Stephen Gostkowski kick), 3:24. Patriots 34–13. Drive: 9 plays, 83 yards, 3:12.
- NE – Stephen Gostkowski 50-yard field goal, 0:28. Patriots 37–13. Drive: 6 plays, 23 yards, 0:59.

Fourth quarter

- BUF – Robert Woods 32-yard pass from Tyrod Taylor, (pass failed), 11:42. Patriots 37–19. Drive: 10 plays, 80 yards, 3:46.
- BUF – Tyrod Taylor 7-yard run, (run failed), 5:27. Patriots 37–25. Drive: 7 plays, 59 yards, 2:43.
- BUF – Sammy Watkins 24-yard pass from Tyrod Taylor, (Dan Carpenter kick), 4:16. Patriots 37–32. Drive: 2 plays, 50 yards, 0:15.
- NE – Stephen Gostkowski 25-yard field goal, 1:15. Patriots 40–32. Drive: 7 plays, 72 yards, 3:01.

Top passers

- NE – Tom Brady – 38/59, 466 yards, 3 TD
- BUF – Tyrod Taylor – 23/30, 242 yards, 3 TD, 3 INT

Top rushers

- NE – Dion Lewis – 7 rushes, 40 yards, TD
- BUF – LeSean McCoy – 15 rushes, 89 yards

Top receivers

- NE – Rob Gronkowski – 7 receptions, 113 yards, TD
- BUF – Sammy Watkins – 6 receptions, 60 yards, TD

Top tacklers

- NE – Jamie Collins – 8 tackles, 2.5 sacks
- BUF – Preston Brown – 6 tackles

Patriots quarterback Tom Brady threw for a career second-best 466 yards, as he completed 38 of 59 pass attempts with three touchdown throws, as the Patriots were able to hold off a late Buffalo Bills rally thanks to their high-octane offense, giving the Patriots their first divisional win of the season.

The match-up between the Bills and Patriots was highly anticipated in the week before the meeting. Both teams had won their first games of the new season and high expectations for the season ahead were falling on both teams, including the host team, who were led by new head coach and old Patriots' foe Rex Ryan (formerly of the New York Jets). The Guinness Book of World Records was invited to Ralph Wilson Stadium to see if the Bills' fans could break the decibel record for crowd noise that was set at Arrowhead Stadium by Kansas City Chiefs' fans in the season prior (coincidentally in a game that the Patriots also featured in as the away team). In a heated game-day atmosphere, the Bills took the opening kickoff and drove the ball 80-yards in ten plays, with rookie running back Karlos Williams scoring on a 2-yard run. Two possessions later, the Patriots, aided by completions of 16 and 36 yards to Aaron Dobson and Gronkowski respectively, raced 62 yards in only 5 plays, with Julian Edelman catching an 8-yard touchdown pass from Brady. After another Bills three-and-out, aided by a 28-yard punt return to the Bills 27 by Danny Amendola coupled with an unnecessary roughness penalty on the Bills, the Patriots need just two plays to go 13 yards and score on a 6-yard touchdown run by Dion Lewis, taking a 14–7 lead. On the ensuing Bills' drive, Tyrod Taylor was intercepted by Super Bowl hero Malcolm Butler, who returned it 9 yards to the Bills 30. The Patriots then marched 30 yards in just 5 plays, scoring on Brady's 6-yard touchdown pass to Gronkowski, extending the lead to 21–7. After a Bills punt, from the Bills 48, Lewis caught a 6-yard pass, but was stripped by Paul Brown with Corey Graham returning it 29 yards to the Patriots 33, but an unnecessary roughness penalty moved them back to the 48. After being forced to punt, the Patriots drove to the Bills 48, but on 4th-and-1 Brady fired an incomplete pass. The Bills finally scored again, racing 48 yards in four penalty marred plays, scoring on a 9-yard touchdown pass to Charles Clay, trimming the deficit to 21–13, after a missed PAT. The Patriots drove to the Bills 28 on their next drive and Stephen Gostkowski converted a 46-yard field goal, increasing the lead to 24–13. The Bills advanced the ball to the 50-yard line on the next drive, but Taylor was intercepted by Harmon a deep pass intended for wide receiver Sammy Watkins with 16 seconds remaining in the half. Brady took a knee on the ensuing drive, with the Patriots going into the half leading 24–13. The Patriots drove 77 yards on the opening drive, all the way to the Bills 3-yard line, but were forced to settle for a 21-yard field goal by Gostkowski, making the score 27–13. After a Bills punt, the Patriots raced 83 yards in 9 plays, with Brady capping off the drive with a 22-yard touchdown pass to a diving Edelman, growing the lead to 34–13. After a Bills three-and-out, the Patriots drove to the Bills 32 and Gostkowski upping the lead to 37–13 on a 50-yard field goal. As the game entered the fourth quarter and with many Bills fans already heading for the exits, the Bills were finally able to establish rhythm with their offense, as Taylor led Buffalo on a 10-play, 80-yard drive, bombing a 32-yard touchdown pass to wide receiver Robert Woods, with a failed two-point conversion, making the score 37–19. The Patriots drove to the Bills 41 on their next drive, but failed to convert. The Bills quickly capitalized, racing 59 yards in only 7 plays, with Taylor running in a 7-yard touchdown, with a missed two-point conversion, trimming the deficit to just 37–25. On the second play of the ensuing Patriots drive, Brady was strip-sacked by Jerry Hughes, with Preston Brown recovering for the Bills at midfield. It only took two plays to cover 50 yards, with Taylor finding Watkins for a 24-yard touchdown, making the score just 37-32 after being down 37–13. As had been the theme throughout the day, the Bills' defense was unable to keep Brady and the Patriots' offense from marching up-and-down the field, and on their final drive, New England drove to the Bills 8 and Gostkowski upped the lead to 40–32 on his 26-yard field goal. On the Bills' first play of the Bills next drive, Taylor was intercepted for the third time of the day, this time by cornerback Logan Ryan at the 50-yard line on a long pass intended for Watkins. Brady kneeled on the ensuing drive, securing the 40–32 win. The Bills' fans failed to set the Guinness World Record for loudest crowd noise.

==== Week 3: vs. Jacksonville Jaguars ====
Week Three: Jacksonville Jaguars at New England Patriots – Game summary

Quarter	1	2	3	4	Total
Jaguars	0	3	7	7	17
Patriots	10	10	17	14	51

at Gillette Stadium, Foxborough, Massachusetts

- Date: September 27
- Game time: 1:00 p.m. EDT
- Game weather: 68 °F (20 °C), clear and cool
- Game attendance: 66,829
- Referee: Walt Coleman
- TV announcers (CBS): Kevin Harlan (play-by-play) and Rich Gannon (color commentator)
- Recap, Gamebook

Game information

First quarter

- NE – Dion Lewis 8-yard run (Stephen Gostkowski kick), 11:55. Patriots 7–0. Drive: 5 plays, 64 yards, 1:56.
- NE – Stephen Gostkowski 46-yard field goal, 2:56. Patriots 10–0. Drive: 10 plays, 62 yards, 4:23.

Second quarter

- JAX – Jason Myers 40-yard field goal, 9:32. Patriots 10–3. Drive: 17 plays, 58 yards, 8:24.
- NE – Stephen Gostkowski 20-yard field goal, 3:42. Patriots 13–3. Drive: 14 plays, 78 yards, 5:50.
- NE – Danny Amendola 1-yard pass from Tom Brady, (Stephen Gostkowski kick), 0:18. Patriots 20–3. Drive: 8 plays, 57 yards, 1:29.

Third quarter

- NE – Stephen Gostkowski 46-yard field goal, 10:50. Patriots 23–3. Drive: 10 plays, 52 yards, 4:10.
- NE – LeGarrette Blount 1-yard run (Stephen Gostkowski kick), 9:04. Patriots 30–3. Drive: 1 play, 67 yards, 0:47.
- JAX – Allen Hurns 59-yard pass from Blake Bortles, (Jason Myers kick), 6:15. Patriots 30–10. Drive: 6 plays, 80 yards, 2:49.
- NE – Keshawn Martin 13-yard pass from Tom Brady, (Stephen Gostkowski kick), 3:18. Patriots 37–10. Drive: 7 plays, 80 yards, 2:57.

Fourth quarter

- NE – LeGarrette Blount 1-yard run (Stephen Gostkowski kick), 14:57. Patriots 44–10. Drive: 5 plays, 24 yards, 1:59.
- NE – LeGarrette Blount 1-yard run (Stephen Gostkowski kick), 3:31. Patriots 51–10. Drive: 17 plays, 58 yards, 9:47.
- JAX – Clay Harbor 6-yard pass from Blake Bortles, (Jason Myers kick), 1:22. Patriots 51–17. Drive: 7 plays, 80 yards, 2:09.

Top passers

- JAX – Blake Bortles – 17/33, 242 yards, 2 TD, INT
- NE – Tom Brady – 33/42, 358 yards, 2 TD

Top rushers

- JAX – T. J. Yeldon – 11 rushes, 33 yards
- NE – LeGarrette Blount – 18 rushes, 78 yards, 3 TD

Top receivers

- JAX – Allen Hurns – 2 receptions, 70 yards, TD
- NE – Rob Gronkowski – 4 receptions, 101 yards

Top tacklers

- JAX – Paul Posluszny –14 tackles
- NE – Jamie Collins – 4 tackles, sack

The Patriots set a new record for points scored against the Jaguars with 51 (breaking the previous record of 50 set by the prolific 1998 Minnesota Vikings).

After forcing the Jaguars to punt, the Patriots 64 yards in just 5 plays, taking less than two minutes, to score on an 8-yard touchdown run by Lewis. The Jaguars moved the ball well on their next drive, reaching the Patriots 46, but on 3rd-and-12, Jabaal Sheard sacked Blake Bortles for a 6-yard loss, forcing Jacksonville to punt. The Patriots drove to the Jaguars 32 on their next drive, but a pass interference penalty moved the Patriots back to the 42, ultimately settling for a 45-yard field goal. The Jaguars then began a marathon 17 play, 58-yard drive, taking 8:24 off the clock, and converting four third-and-longs, but could only settle for a 40-yard field goal by Jason Myers. The Patriots countered, marching 78 yards in 14 plays to the Jacksonville 2-yard line, but the Jags defense held and the Patriots settled for a 20-yard field goal, increasing their lead to 13–3. The Jaguars drove to the Patriots 45 on their next drive, but McCourty intercepted the pass at the Patriots 16 and returned it 27 yards to the Patriots 43. The Patriots raced 57 yards in just 8 plays and 1:29, scoring on 1-yard touchdown pass to Danny Amendola, increasing the lead to 20–3. Bortles took a knee and the game went to halftime with the Patriots up 20–3. The Patriots drove to the Jaguars 21 on the opening drive of the second half, but on 3rd-and-13, Brady was sacked for a 7-yard loss by Ryan Davis and Gostkowski kicked a 45-yard field goal, increasing the lead to 23–3. After a Jacksonville three-and-out, the Patriots had one of the strangest scoring "drives" in NFL history. Gronkowski was flagged for offensive pass interference pushing the ball five yards back to the Patriots 33. On the very next play, Brady attempted a deep pass to Aaron Dobson that fell incomplete, but Jacksonville was flagged for pass interference moving the ball to the Jaguars 25. Again, on the very next play, Brady was intercepted by Davon House who returned the ball 82 yards to the Patriots 26, however, the Jags were called for pass interference again, moving the ball to the 1-yard line. On the very next play, LeGarrette Blount ran it in for a touchdown and a 30-3 Patriots lead. The Jaguars finally struck for a touchdown on their next drive as Blake Bortles hit Allen Hurns for a 59-yard touchdown pass to end the 80-yard drive. The Patriots were relentless, though. Following Jacksonville's touchdown, the Patriots matched with one of their own. Midway through the 7 play, 80-yard drive, a horse-collar tackle at the end of a 17-yard Blount run moved the ball to the Jaguars 15. Two plays later Brady hit rookie receiver Keshawn Martin on a 13-yard touchdown pass, increasing the lead to 37–10. After forcing the Jaguars into a turnover on downs, the Patriots didn't skip a beat marching 24 yards, needing only 5 plays, with Blount rushing for a 1-yard touchdown on the first play of the fourth quarter making the score an embarrassing 44–10. Following a Jaguars three-and-out, the Patriots took a page from the Jaguars playbook slowly moving 58 yards in 17 plays, taking 9:47 off the clock, scoring on another 1-yard touchdown run by Blount, blowing the lid off with a 51–10 score. Bortles commanded an 80-yard drive, hitting tight end Clay Harbor for a 6-yard touchdown. Jimmy Garoppolo took two knees and the game was over.

The Patriots won the turnover battle 1–0, dominated in total yards 471–293, more than doubled their first down total at 35–15, and held the ball for almost 10 minutes longer. With the win the Patriots improved to 3–0 and showed the damage their offense can do.

==== Week 5: at Dallas Cowboys ====
Week Five: New England Patriots at Dallas Cowboys – Game summary

Quarter	1	2	3	4	Total
Patriots	3	10	7	10	30
Cowboys	3	0	3	0	6

at AT&T Stadium, Arlington, Texas

- Date: October 11
- Game time: 4:25 p.m. EDT/3:25 p.m. CDT
- Game weather: Played indoors (retractable roof closed)
- Game attendance: 93,054
- Referee: Clete Blakeman
- TV announcers (CBS): Jim Nantz (play-by-play), Phil Simms (color commentator) and Tracy Wolfson (sideline reporter)
- Recap, Gamebook

Game information

First quarter

- NE – Stephen Gostkowski 49-yard field goal, 8:19. Patriots 3–0. Drive: 5 plays, 14 yards, 2:04.
- DAL – Dan Bailey 51-yard field goal, 1:46. tied 3–3. Drive: 10 plays, 47 yards, 6:33.

Second quarter

- NE – Tom Brady 1-yard run (Stephen Gostkowski kick), 3:39. Patriots 10–3. Drive: 7 plays, 55 yards, 2:18.
- NE – Stephen Gostkowski 57-yard field goal, 0:03. Patriots 13–3. Drive: 4 plays, 16 yards, 0:50.

Third quarter

- NE – Dion Lewis 10-yard pass from Tom Brady, (Stephen Gostkowski kick), 9:48. Patriots 20–3. Drive: 9 plays, 80 yards, 5:12.
- DAL – Dan Bailey 23-yard field goal, 1:17. Patriots 20–6. Drive: 15 plays, 75 yards, 8:31.

Fourth quarter

- NE – Julian Edelman 59-yard pass from Tom Brady, (Stephen Gostkowski kick), 12:58. Patriots 27–6. Drive: 5 plays, 80 yards, 3:19.
- NE – Stephen Gostkowski 34-yard field goal, 4:41. Patriots 30–6. Drive: 5 plays, 37 yards, 1:39.

Top passers

- NE – Tom Brady – 20/27, 275 yards, 2 TD
- DAL – Brandon Weeden – 26/39, 188 yards, INT

Top rushers

- NE – LeGarrette Blount – 13 rushes, 74 yards
- DAL – Joseph Randle – 15 rushes, 60 yards

Top receivers

- NE – Julian Edelman – 4 receptions, 120 yards, TD
- DAL – Darren McFadden – 9 receptions, 62 yards

Top tacklers

- NE – Jamie Collins – 6 tackles, 4 assists
- DAL – Barry Church – 5 tackles, 3 assists

Instead of the Tony Romo vs Tom Brady match-up, Brandon Weeden started due to Romo's broken collarbone he suffered in Week 2.

After the first three possessions of the game ended in punts, Amendola set the Patriots up with good field position with a 25-yard punt return to the Cowboys 45. After a 14-yard screen pass to Lewis to the 31, a 7-yard sack by Greg Hardy pushed the Patriots back to the 38, and they ultimately settled for a 49-yard field goal by Gostkowski. The Cowboys replied, driving to the Patriots 33 and Dan Bailey tied the game with a 51-yard field goal. Midway through the second quarter, the Patriots raced 55 yards in just over two minutes, scoring the first touchdown of the game on a 1-yard touchdown run by Brady, taking a 10–3 lead. The next three possessions of the game ended in punts, but with 0:53 seconds left in the half, the Patriots reached the Cowboys 39, and Gostkowski made the longest field-goal of his career, a 57-yarder, upping the lead to 13–3 at halftime. Brady was sacked five times in the first half. The Patriots increased their lead, stringing together a 9 play, 80-yard drive, scoring on a 10-yard touchdown pass from Brady to Lewis, increasing the lead to 20–3. The Cowboys countered, marching 75-yards in 15 plays to the Patriots 7, and trimmed the deficit to 20–6 on a 23-yard field goal. The Patriots struck again on their next drive, driving 80 yards in just 5 plays, scoring on a 59-yard touchdown pass from Brady to Edelman, widening the lead to 27–6. On the Cowboys next drive, after a 6-yard gain by Jason Witten to the Cowboys 43, he was stripped by Collins with Jonathan Freeny returning it to the Patriots 36. The Patriots turned the ball over on downs when Blount was tackled for no gain on 4th-and-1. The Cowboys drove to the Patriots 46 and Ryan intercepted Weeden at the Patriots 22, returning it 25 yards to the Patriots 47. The Patriots reached the Cowboys 16 and Gostkowski increased the lead to 30–6 on a 34-yard field goal. The Cowboys drove all the way to the Patriots 6, but turned the ball over on downs again. Once again Garoppolo took two knees and the game was over.

==== Week 6: at Indianapolis Colts ====
Week Six: New England Patriots at Indianapolis Colts – Game summary

Quarter	1	2	3	4	Total
Patriots	7	13	7	7	34
Colts	7	14	0	6	27

at Lucas Oil Stadium, Indianapolis, Indiana

- Date: October 18
- Game time: 8:30 p.m. EDT
- Game weather: Played indoors (retractable roof closed)
- Game attendance: 66,726
- Referee: Tony Corrente
- TV announcers (NBC): Al Michaels (play-by-play), Cris Collinsworth (color commentator) and Michele Tafoya (sideline reporter)
- Recap, Gamebook

Game information

First quarter

- IND – Donte Moncrief 5-yard pass from Andrew Luck, (Adam Vinatieri kick), 7:16. Colts 7–0. Drive: 13 plays, 89 yards, 7:44.
- NE – Julian Edelman 12-yard pass from Tom Brady, (Stephen Gostkowski kick), 2:50. tied 7–7. Drive: 10 plays, 80 yards, 4:26.

Second quarter

- NE – Stephen Gostkowski 40-yard field goal, 13:48. Patriots 10–7. Drive: 10 plays, 69 yards, 2:53.
- IND – Mike Adams 14-yard interception return (Adam Vinatieri kick), 11:30. Colts 14–10.
- NE – LeGarrette Blount 38-yard run (Stephen Gostkowski kick), 9:33. Patriots 17–14. Drive: 4 plays, 65 yards, 1:57.
- IND – T. Y. Hilton 3-yard pass from Andrew Luck, (Adam Vinatieri kick), 2:38. Colts 21–17. Drive: 12 plays, 80 yards, 6:55.
- NE – Stephen Gostkowski 35-yard field goal, 0:02. Colts 21–20. Drive: 9 plays, 63 yards, 2:36.

Third quarter

- NE – Rob Gronkowski 25-yard pass from Tom Brady, (Stephen Gostkowski kick), 10:56. Patriots 27–21. Drive: 7 plays, 80 yards, 4:04.

Fourth quarter

- NE – LeGarrette Blount 11-yard pass from Tom Brady, (Stephen Gostkowski kick), 12:48. Patriots 34–21. Drive: 6 plays, 35 yards, 3:24.
- IND – Griff Whalen 18-yard pass from Andrew Luck (kick blocked), 1:19. Patriots 34–27. Drive: 8 plays, 85 yards, 1:44.

Top passers

- NE – Tom Brady – 23/37, 312 yards, 3 TD, INT
- IND – Andrew Luck – 30/50, 312 yards, 3 TD

Top rushers

- NE – LeGarrette Blount – 16 rushes, 93 yards, TD
- IND – Frank Gore – 13 rushes, 78 yards

Top receivers

- NE – Danny Amendola – 7 receptions, 105 yards
- IND – T. Y. Hilton – 6 receptions, 74 yards, TD

Top tacklers

- NE – Devin McCourty – 7 tackles
- IND – Jerrell Freeman – 6 tackles

For the fourth consecutive season the Patriots faced Andrew Luck and the Colts, with Luck looking to beat the Patriots for the first time in his career.

The Colts overcame their inability to finish off drives like in years past, marching on a 13-play, 89-yard drive, draining 7:44 off the clock and scoring a 5-yard touchdown pass from Luck to Donte Moncrief for an early 7–0 lead. The Patriots answered, going 80 yards in 10 plays, with Brady finding Edelman for a 12-yard touchdown pass, tying the game 7-7. After a Colts three-and-out, the Patriots drove to Colts 22 and Gostkowski made a 39-yard field goal. After another Colts punt, Mike Adams intercepted Brady and returned it 14 yards for a touchdown. The Colts bizarrely tried an onside kick, but the Patriots recovered at their own 35. It took just four plays to score, with Blount busting off a 38-yard touchdown run, giving the Patriots a 17–14 lead early in the second quarter. The Colts countered yet again, though. Stringing together a 10 play, 80-yard drive, scoring on 3-yard touchdown pass from Luck to T. Y. Hilton, giving the Colts the lead again 21–17. The Patriots drove to the Colts 7 and Brady hit Chandler for a 7-yard touchdown, but the play was nullified on a pass interference call on Chandler. Gostkowski kicked a 35-yard field goal on the next play, giving the Colts a 21–20 lead at halftime. The Patriots took the first drive of the second half, driving 80 yards in 7 plays, scoring on Brady's 25-yard touchdown pass to Gronkowski, giving the Patriots the lead again 27–21. Four possessions later, the Colts reached the Patriots 37 and attempted a trick play which would come to be known as the Colts Catastrophe; on fourth down, Indianapolis attempted a fake punt that resulted in a tackle for loss. The Patriots declined an illegal formation penalty on the play. Taking over at the Colts 35, the Patriots needed just 6 plays, scoring on an 11-yard screen pass from Brady to Blount, increasing their lead to 34-21 a few plays into the fourth quarter. Several possessions later, the Colts drove to the Patriots 38, but turned the ball over on downs again. However, the Colts forced a quick three-and-out, and raced 85 yard in 8 plays, scoring on Luck's 18-yard touchdown pass to Whalen, with a missed extra point from Adam Vinatieri, keeping the score 34–27 with just 1:19 left. Gronkowski recovered the Colts onside kick attempt and Brady took two knees to end the game. This was the Patriots sixth straight win in the series. The game lead tied or changed five times by halfway through the third quarter.

==== Week 7: vs. New York Jets ====
Week Seven: New York Jets at New England Patriots – Game summary

Quarter	1	2	3	4	Total
Jets	3	7	7	6	23
Patriots	3	10	3	14	30

at Gillette Stadium, Foxborough, Massachusetts

- Date: October 25
- Game time: 1:00 p.m. EDT
- Game weather: 58 °F (14 °C), cloudy
- Game attendance: 66,829
- Referee: Bill Vinovich
- TV announcers (CBS): Ian Eagle (play-by-play), Dan Fouts (color commentator) and Evan Washburn (sideline reporter)
- Recap, Gamebook

Game information

First quarter

- NE – Stephen Gostkowski 38-yard field goal, 12:48. Patriots 3–0. Drive: 4 plays, -1 yard, 1:22.
- NYJ – Nick Folk 20-yard field goal, 7:29. tied 3–3. Drive: 15 plays, 78 yards, 5:19.

Second quarter

- NYJ – Jeremy Kerley 5-yard pass from Ryan Fitzpatrick, (Nick Folk kick), 12:30. Jets 10–3. Drive: 14 plays, 83 yards, 7:35.
- NE – Tom Brady 1-yard run (Stephen Gostkowski kick), 6:24. tied 10–10. Drive: 11 plays, 47 yards, 3:26.
- NE – Stephen Gostkowski 46-yard field goal, 2:00. Patriots 13–10. Drive: 7 plays, 31 yards, 2:49.

Third quarter

- NE – Stephen Gostkowski 24-yard field goal, 11:10. Patriots 16–10. Drive: 12 plays, 65 yards, 3:50.
- NYJ – Chris Ivory 9-yard pass from Ryan Fitzpatrick, (Nick Folk kick), 4:07. Jets 17–16. Drive: 13 plays, 80 yards, 7:03.

Fourth quarter

- NYJ – Nick Folk 30-yard field goal, 12:50. Jets 20–16. Drive: 9 plays, 71 yards, 4:12.
- NE – Danny Amendola 8-yard pass from Tom Brady, (Stephen Gostkowski kick), 7:16. Patriots 23–20. Drive: 10 plays, 80 yards, 5:34.
- NE – Rob Gronkowski 15-yard pass from Tom Brady, (Stephen Gostkowski kick), 1:13. Patriots 30–20. Drive: 10 plays, 68 yards, 4:19.
- NYJ – Nick Folk 55-yard field goal, 0:18. Patriots 30–23. Drive: 6 plays, 43 yards, 0:55.

Top passers

- NYJ – Ryan Fitzpatrick – 22/39, 295 yards, 2 TD
- NE – Tom Brady – 34/54, 355 yards, 2 TD

Top rushers

- NYJ – Chris Ivory – 17 rushes, 41 yards
- NE – Tom Brady – 4 rushes, 15 yards, TD

Top receivers

- NYJ – Eric Decker – 6 receptions, 94 yards
- NE – Rob Gronkowski – 11 receptions, 108 yards, TD

Top tacklers

- NYJ – Marcus Gilchrist – 8 tackles
- NE – Dont'a Hightower – 10 tackles

On the Jets' second play of the game, Ryan Fitzpatrick was strip-sacked by Jones with Hightower recovering at the Jets 19. The Patriots didn't gain a single yard, but Gostkowski gave the Patriots the lead on a 38-yard field goal. The Jets countered with a 15 play drive all the way to the Patriots 2-yard line, but were forced to settle for a 20-yard field goal by Nick Folk. After a Patriots punt, the Jets strung together a 14 play, 83-yard drive scoring on a 5-yard touchdown pass from Jeremy Kerley, giving the Jets a 10–3 lead in the second quarter. A few possessions later, the Patriots marched 47 yards, scoring on a 1-yard touchdown run by Brady on 4th-and-Goal, tying the game. After a Jets punt, Edelman gave the Patriots a good start with a 17-yard return to the Patriots 41. The Patriots drove to the Jets 20, but an 8-yard sack by Calvin Pace forced the Patriots to settle for a 47-yard field goal, giving the Patriots a 13–10 lead at halftime. After Amendola returned the opening kickoff 28 yards to the Jets 29, the Patriots drove all the way to the Jets 6, but were forced to settle for another field goal, increasing the lead to 16–10. The Jets countered with a 13 play, 80-yard drive, taking seven minutes off the clock, scoring on a 9-yard pass to Chris Ivory, giving the Jets a 17–16 lead. After a Patriots punt, the Jets drove all the way to the Jets 12, but settled for a 30-yard field goal by Folk, increasing their lead to 20-16 a few minutes into the fourth quarter. The Patriots countered with a 10 play, 80-yard march, scoring on an 8-yard touchdown pass to Amendola, retaking the lead 23–20. After the Jets punted, the Patriots scored again, with Brady's 15-yard touchdown pass to Gronkowski widening their lead to 30–20 with just 1:13 remaining. The Jets drove to the Patriots 37 and Folk trimmed the deficit to 30–23 with a 55-yard field goal with just 0:18 seconds left. Brandon Marshall recovered the onside kick at the Patriots 49 with 14 seconds left, giving the Jets a chance to tie game. After a 12-yard catch by Eric Decker, Marshall was flagged for a false start, allowing the clock to run out and end the game.

==== Week 8: vs. Miami Dolphins ====
Week Eight: Miami Dolphins at New England Patriots – Game summary

Quarter	1	2	3	4	Total
Dolphins	0	0	7	0	7
Patriots	7	12	3	14	36

at Gillette Stadium, Foxborough, Massachusetts

- Date: October 29
- Game time: 8:25 p.m. EDT
- Game weather: 58 °F (14 °C), cloudy and windy
- Game attendance: 66,829
- Referee: Pete Morelli
- TV announcers (CBS/NFLN): Jim Nantz (play-by-play), Phil Simms (color commentator) and Tracy Wolfson (sideline reporter)
- Recap, Gamebook

Game information

First quarter

- NE – Rob Gronkowski 47-yard pass from Tom Brady, (Stephen Gostkowski kick), 10:12. Patriots 7–0. Drive: 8 plays, 80 yards, 4:48.

Second quarter

- NE – Ryan Tannehill fumble out of bounds in end zone for a safety, 14:05. Patriots 9–0.
- NE – Stephen Gostkowski 52-yard field goal, 3:25. Patriots 12–0. Drive: 4 plays, 5 yards, 1:52.
- NE – Dion Lewis 16-yard pass from Tom Brady, (Stephen Gostkowski kick), 0:24. Patriots 19–0. Drive: 5 plays, 51 yards, 1:17.

Third quarter

- MIA – Lamar Miller 1-yard run (Andrew Franks kick), 11:25. Patriots 19–7. Drive: 7 plays, 80 yards, 3:35.
- NE – Stephen Gostkowski 36-yard field goal, 6:09. Patriots 22–7. Drive: 11 plays, 62 yards, 5:16.

Fourth quarter

- NE – Julian Edelman 10-yard pass from Tom Brady, (Stephen Gostkowski kick), 13:29. Patriots 29–7. Drive: 3 plays, 15 yards, 0:46.
- NE – Julian Edelman 16-yard pass from Tom Brady, (Stephen Gostkowski kick), 7:17. Patriots 36–7. Drive: 7 plays, 80 yards, 4:11.

Top passers

- MIA – Ryan Tannehill – 28/44, 300 yards, 2 INT
- NE – Tom Brady – 26/38, 356 yards, 4 TD

Top rushers

- MIA – Lamar Miller – 9 rushes, 15 yards, TD
- NE – LeGarrette Blount – 17 rushes, 72 yards

Top receivers

- MIA – Jarvis Landry – 6 receptions, 71 yards
- NE – Rob Gronkowski – 6 receptions, 113 yards, TD

Top tacklers

- MIA – Kelvin Sheppard & Reshad Jones – 5 tackles
- NE – Logan Ryan – 6 tackles

The Patriots took the opening kickoff and after mostly short completions and Blount runs, Brady hit Gronkowski for a 47-yard touchdown pass for an early 7–0 lead. Ryan Allen's 35-yard punt stuck the Dolphins at their own -1. On third-and-10, Ryan Tannehill was sacked by for a safety and a 9-0 Patriots lead.

==== Week 9: vs. Washington Redskins ====
Week Nine: Washington Redskins at New England Patriots – Game summary

Quarter	1	2	3	4	Total
Redskins	0	3	0	7	10
Patriots	14	3	3	7	27

at Gillette Stadium, Foxborough, Massachusetts

- Date: November 8
- Game time: 1:00 p.m. EST
- Game weather: 54 °F (12 °C), sunny
- Game attendance: 66,829
- Referee: Terry McAulay
- TV announcers (Fox): Kevin Burkhardt (play-by-play), John Lynch (color commentator) and Pam Oliver (sideline reporter)
- Recap, Gamebook

Game information

First quarter

- NE – Julian Edelman 8-yard pass from Tom Brady, (Stephen Gostkowski kick), 9:01. Patriots 7–0. Drive: 13 plays, 84 yards, 5:59.
- NE – LeGarrette Blount 5-yard run (Stephen Gostkowski kick), 4:30. Patriots 14–0. Drive: 6 plays, 28 yards, 1:59.

Second quarter

- NE – Stephen Gostkowski 21-yard field goal, 7:56. Patriots 17–0. Drive: 10 plays, 61 yards, 5:03.
- WAS – Dustin Hopkins 23-yard field goal, 0:13. Patriots 17–3. Drive: 16 plays, 75 yards, 7:43.

Third quarter

- NE – Stephen Gostkowski 21-yard field goal, 7:32. Patriots 20–3. Drive: 9 plays, 54 yards, 4:38.

Fourth quarter

- NE – Brandon Bolden 18-yard pass from Tom Brady, (Stephen Gostkowski kick), 11:28. Patriots 27–3. Drive: 14 plays, 88 yards, 7:42.
- WAS – Jordan Reed 3-yard pass from Kirk Cousins, (Dustin Hopkins kick), 0:25. Patriots 27–10. Drive: 12 plays, 83 yards, 3:26.

Top passers

- WAS – Kirk Cousins – 22/40, 217 yards, TD, INT
- NE – Tom Brady – 26/39, 299 yards, 2 TD, INT

Top rushers

- WAS – Matt Jones – 11 rushes, 27 yards
- NE – LeGarrette Blount – 29 rushes, 129 yards, TD

Top receivers

- WAS – Pierre Garçon – 4 receptions, 70 yards
- NE – Brandon LaFell – 5 receptions, 102 yards

Top tacklers

- WAS – Chris Baker – 5 tackles
- NE – Logan Ryan – 6 tackles

With their third win over Washington since 2007, the Patriots improved to 2-0 against the NFC East.

==== Week 10: at New York Giants ====
Week Ten: New England Patriots at New York Giants – Game summary

Quarter	1	2	3	4	Total
Patriots	7	3	7	10	27
Giants	7	10	6	3	26

at MetLife Stadium, East Rutherford, New Jersey

- Date: November 15
- Game time: 4:25 p.m. EST
- Game weather: 60 °F (16 °C), clear
- Game attendance: 81,061
- Referee: Ed Hochuli
- TV announcers (CBS): Jim Nantz (play-by-play), Phil Simms (color commentator) and Tracy Wolfson (sideline reporter)
- Recap, Gamebook

Game information

First quarter

- NE – Scott Chandler 1-yard pass from Tom Brady, (Stephen Gostkowski kick), 6:40. Patriots 7–0. Drive: 14 plays, 80 yards, 8:20.
- NYG – Odell Beckham Jr. 87-yard pass from Eli Manning, (Josh Brown kick), 5:49. tied 7–7. Drive: 2 plays, 91 yards, 0:51.

Second quarter

- NE – Stephen Gostkowski 31-yard field goal, 12:54. Patriots 10–7. Drive: 10 plays, 57 yards, 5:28.
- NYG – Josh Brown 37-yard field goal, 3:42. tied 10–10. Drive: 9 plays, 35 yards, 3:17.
- NYG – Dwayne Harris 1-yard pass from Eli Manning, (Josh Brown kick), 0:13. Giants 17–10. Drive: 7 plays, 74 yards, 0:56.

Third quarter

- NYG – Josh Brown 38-yard field goal, 9:32. Giants 20–10. Drive: 10 plays, 60 yards, 5:28.
- NE – LeGarrette Blount 1-yard run (Stephen Gostkowski kick), 4:46. Giants 20–17. Drive: 3 plays, 7 yards, 1:23.
- NYG – Josh Brown 53-yard field goal, 0:49. Giants 23–17. Drive: 9 plays, 45 yards, 3:57.

Fourth quarter

- NE – Rob Gronkowski 76-yard pass from Tom Brady, (Stephen Gostkowski kick), 11:33. Patriots 24–23. Drive: 3 plays, 86 yards, 1:25.
- NYG – Josh Brown 29-yard field goal, 1:47. Giants 26–24. Drive: 15 plays, 86 yards, 4:14.
- NE – Stephen Gostkowski 54-yard field goal, 0:01. Patriots 27–26. Drive: 12 plays, 44 yards, 1:46.

Top passers

- NE – Tom Brady – 26/42, 334 yards, 2 TD, INT
- NYG – Eli Manning – 24/44, 361 yards, 2 TD

Top rushers

- NE – LeGarrette Blount – 19 rushes, 66 yards, TD
- NYG – Rashad Jennings – 11 rushes, 39 yards

Top receivers

- NE – Rob Gronkowski – 5 receptions, 113 yards, TD
- NYG – Odell Beckham Jr. – 4 receptions, 104 yards, TD

Top tacklers

- NE – Dont'a Hightower – 8 tackles
- NYG – Jasper Brinkley – 9 tackles, sack

The Patriots opened the game with a 14 play, 80-yard drive, converting three third-downs and taking eight-and-a-half minutes off the clock, scoring on a one-yard touchdown pass to Chandler. The Giants needed just 51 seconds to score. After a 4-yard run by Rashad Jennings, Eli Manning hit Odell Beckham Jr. on 87-yard catch-and-run for a touchdown. After both teams went three-and-out, the Patriots drove all the way to the Giants 8, but on 3rd-and-4 Brady was sacked by Craig Dahl for a 5-yard loss and Gostkowski gave the Patriots the lead with a 31-yard field goal. On the ensuing drive, the Giants drove all the way to the Patriots 16, but Manning was strip-sacked by Chandler Jones with Justin Coleman recovering at the Patriots 16. After a Patriots three-and-out, the Giants drove all the way to the Patriots 11, but settled for a 29-yard field goal by Josh Brown, tying the game 10-10. After a Patriots punt, the Giants engineered a 7 play, 74-yard drive, scoring on a 1-yard touchdown pass to Dwayne Harris, giving the Giants a 17–10 lead with 13 seconds left in the half. Brady took a knee and the game went to halftime. The Giants took the opening kick of the second half and marched 60 yards to the Patriots 20 and Brown extended the Giants lead to 20–10 on a 38-yard field goal. Later, after forcing the Giant to a three-and-out, Amendola returned the punt 82 yards to the Giants 7. Three plays later, scoring on a 1-yard touchdown run by Blount, trimming the deficit to 20–17. The Giants countered, driving all the way to the Patriots 35 with Brown draining a 53-yard field goal increasing the lead to 23–17. On the first play of the fourth quarter, Brady was strip-sacked by Jasper Brinkley with Markus Kuhn returning it 8 yards to the Patriots 31. Ninkovich sacked Manning for a 13-yard loss on the first play and the Patriots forced the Giants to a three-and-out. Starting at their own 14, two completions moved the Patriots to the 24. On the next play, Brady hit Gronk on a 76-yard catch-and-run for a touchdown, giving the Patriots a 24–23 lead. After a Giants three-and-out, facing a 3rd-and-4, Brady hit LaFell on a 54-yard bomb to the Giants 15. Four plays later, Blount scored on a 1-yard touchdown run, but the play was nullified by a holding penalty on David Andrews. Three plays later, Brady was intercepted at the Giants 1 by Trumaine McBride who returned it 2 yards to the 3. The Giants drove to the Patriots 5 and Manning hit Beckham for the go-ahead touchdown, but after official review, it was ruled that he stepped out of bounds before becoming a runner, and it was ruled an incomplete pass. After an incomplete pass, Manning was sacked for a 6-yard loss. Brown kicked a 29-yard field goal, giving the Giants a 26–24 lead with 1:47 remaining in the game. On the very first play, Brady was seemingly intercepted by Landon Collins on a deep pass attempt for Aaron Dobson, but Collins didn't maintain control and it was ruled an incomplete pass. After two straight incomplete passes, Brady hit Amendola for a 12-yard gain on 4th-and-10. The Patriots drove to the Giants 36, and Gostkowski made the 54-yard field goal after the kick seemed to be sailing right, giving the Patriots a 27–26 lead with 1 second left. The Giants tried a lateral on the ensuing kick, but Beckham was knocked out of bounds at the Giants 11 and the Patriots escaped, keeping their undefeated season alive. With the win, the Patriots improved to 9-0 for the first time since their undefeated regular season of 2007, and snapped their three-game losing streak against the Giants dating back to Super Bowl XLII. With a Bengals loss to the Texans the same week, the Patriots remained the only undefeated team in the AFC.

==== Week 11: vs. Buffalo Bills ====
Week Eleven: Buffalo Bills at New England Patriots – Game summary

Quarter	1	2	3	4	Total
Bills	0	3	7	3	13
Patriots	3	7	10	0	20

at Gillette Stadium, Foxborough, Massachusetts

- Date: November 23
- Game time: 8:30 p.m. EST
- Game weather: 29 °F (−2 °C), clear and cold
- Game attendance: 66,829
- Referee: Gene Steratore
- TV announcers (ESPN): Mike Tirico (play-by-play), Jon Gruden (color commentator) and Lisa Salters (sideline reporter)
- Recap, Gamebook

Game information

First quarter

- NE – Stephen Gostkowski 35-yard field goal, 7:29. Patriots 3–0. Drive: 11 plays, 49 yards, 5:56.

Second quarter

- BUF – Dan Carpenter 52-yard field goal, 9:27. tied 3–3. Drive: 11 plays, 51 yards, 5:36.
- NE – James White 20-yard pass from Tom Brady, (Stephen Gostkowski kick), 0:13. Patriots 10–3. Drive: 6 plays, 62 yards, 0:33.

Third quarter

- BUF – LeSean McCoy 27-yard run (Dan Carpenter kick), 10:29. tied 10–10. Drive: 5 plays, 56 yards, 2:06.
- NE – James White 6-yard run (Stephen Gostkowski kick), 5:55. Patriots 17–10. Drive: 6 plays, 64 yards, 2:04.
- NE – Stephen Gostkowski 35-yard field goal, 0:47. Patriots 20–10. Drive: 6 plays, 14 yards, 1:50.

Fourth quarter

- BUF – Dan Carpenter 33-yard field goal, 3:30. Patriots 20–13. Drive: 9 plays, 60 yards, 4:05.

Top passers

- BUF – Tyrod Taylor – 20/36, 233 yards
- NE – Tom Brady – 20/39, 277 yards, TD, INT

Top rushers

- BUF – LeSean McCoy – 20 rushes, 82 yards, TD
- NE – LeGarrette Blount – 16 rushes, 56 yards

Top receivers

- BUF – Chris Hogan – 6 receptions, 95 yards
- NE – Danny Amendola – 9 receptions, 117 yards

Top tacklers

- BUF – Bacarri Rambo – 6 tackles, 2 assists on tackles
- NE – Logan Ryan – 7 tackles, 2 assists on tackles

With the win, the Patriots improved to 10–0, and clinched their 13th consecutive 10 win season.

==== Week 12: at Denver Broncos ====
Week Twelve: New England Patriots at Denver Broncos – Game summary

Quarter	1	2	3	4	OT	Total
Patriots	7	7	0	10	0	24
Broncos	0	7	0	17	6	30

at Sports Authority Field at Mile High, Denver, Colorado

- Date: November 29
- Game time: 8:30 p.m. EST/6:30 p.m. MST
- Game weather: 23 °F (−5 °C), cloudy with light snow
- Game attendance: 76,970
- Referee: Tony Corrente
- TV announcers (NBC): Al Michaels (play-by-play), Cris Collinsworth (color commentator) and Michele Tafoya (sideline reporter)
- Recap, Gamebook

Game information

First quarter

- NE – Rob Gronkowski 23-yard pass from Tom Brady, (Stephen Gostkowski kick), 11:24. Patriots 7–0. Drive: 4 plays, 47 yards, 2:03.

Second quarter

- NE – Scott Chandler 9-yard pass from Tom Brady, (Stephen Gostkowski kick), 10:40. Patriots 14–0. Drive: 3 plays, 15 yards, 1:32.
- DEN – Ronnie Hillman 19-yard run (Brandon McManus kick), 2:07. Patriots 14–7. Drive: 10 plays, 77 yards, 5:41.

Third quarter

- No scoring plays

Fourth quarter

- NE – Brandon Bolden 63-yard pass from Tom Brady, (Stephen Gostkowski kick), 14:50. Patriots 21–7. Drive: 3 plays, 65 yards, 0:17.
- DEN – C. J. Anderson 15-yard run (Brandon McManus kick), 12:34. Patriots 21–14. Drive: 4 plays, 36 yards, 1:41.
- DEN – Brandon McManus 21-yard field goal, 6:08. Patriots 21–17. Drive: 9 plays, 52 yards, 4:50.
- DEN – Andre Caldwell 4-yard pass from Brock Osweiler, (Brandon McManus kick), 1:09. Broncos 24–21. Drive: 5 plays, 83 yards, 1:22.
- NE – Stephen Gostkowski 47-yard field goal, 0:00. tied 24–24. Drive: 5 plays, 51 yards, 1:09.

Overtime

- DEN – C. J. Anderson 48-yard run, 12:32. Broncos 30–24. Drive: 3 plays, 57 yards, 1:19.

Top passers

- NE – Tom Brady – 23/42, 280 yards, 3 TD
- DEN – Brock Osweiler – 23/42, 270 yards, TD, INT

Top rushers

- NE – LeGarrette Blount – 9 rushes, 27 yards
- DEN – C. J. Anderson – 15 rushes, 113 yards, 2 TD

Top receivers

- NE – Rob Gronkowski – 6 receptions, 88 yards, TD
- DEN – Emmanuel Sanders – 6 receptions, 113 yards

Top tacklers

- NE – Jonathan Freeny – 7 tackles, 5 assists on tackles, sack
- DEN – Derek Wolfe – 6 tackles, 2 assists on tackles, sack

==== Week 13: vs. Philadelphia Eagles ====
Week Thirteen: Philadelphia Eagles at New England Patriots – Game summary

Quarter	1	2	3	4	Total
Eagles	0	14	14	7	35
Patriots	0	14	0	14	28

at Gillette Stadium, Foxborough, Massachusetts

- Date: December 6
- Game time: 4:25 p.m. EST
- Game weather: 52 °F (11 °C), clear
- Game attendance: 66,829
- Referee: Pete Morelli
- TV announcers (Fox): Thom Brennaman (play-by-play), Charles Davis (color commentator) and Tony Siragusa (sideline reporter)
- Recap, Gamebook

Game information

First quarter

- No scoring plays

Second quarter

- NE – James White 4-yard pass from Tom Brady, (Stephen Gostkowski kick), 14:57. Patriots 7–0. Drive: 10 plays, 80 yards, 3:46.
- NE – Danny Amendola 11-yard pass from Tom Brady, (Stephen Gostkowski kick), 7:47. Patriots 14–0. Drive: 8 plays, 80 yards, 4:53.
- PHI – Zach Ertz 5-yard pass from Sam Bradford, (Caleb Sturgis kick), 4:04. Patriots 14–7. Drive: 8 plays, 59 yards, 3:43.
- PHI – Najee Goode 24-yard return of blocked punt (Caleb Sturgis kick), 0:08. tied 14–14.

Third quarter

- PHI – Malcolm Jenkins 99-yard interception return (Caleb Sturgis kick), 7:26. Eagles 21–14.
- PHI – Darren Sproles 83-yard punt return (Caleb Sturgis kick), 4:18. Eagles 28–14.

Fourth quarter

- PHI – Jordan Matthews 10-yard pass from Sam Bradford, (Caleb Sturgis kick), 11:09. Eagles 35–14. Drive: 12 plays, 80 yards, 6:07.
- NE – Scott Chandler 14-yard pass from Tom Brady, (Stephen Gostkowski kick), 5:27. Eagles 35–21. Drive: 7 plays, 71 yards, 2:18.
- NE – Tom Brady 1-yard run (Stephen Gostkowski kick), 3:00. Eagles 35–28. Drive: 9 plays, 56 yards, 2:27.

Top passers

- PHI – Sam Bradford – 14/24, 120 yards, 2 TD
- NE – Tom Brady – 29/56, 312 yards, 3 TD, 2 INT

Top rushers

- PHI – Darren Sproles – 15 rushes, 66 yards
- NE – LeGarrette Blount – 13 rushes, 54 yards

Top receivers

- PHI – Jordan Matthews – 3 receptions, 36 yards, TD
- NE – James White – 10 receptions, 115 yards, TD

Top tacklers

- PHI – Walter Thurmond – 6 tackles, 4 assists on tackles
- NE – Jamie Collins – 3 tackles, 5 assists on tackles

In a game that the Patriots were expected to dominate, the Eagles pulled a shocking upset. After leading 14–0 early, the Eagles ripped off 35 consecutive points, highlighted by a 100-yard pick-six by Malcolm Jenkins off Brady that gave Philadelphia the lead. Despite two consecutive touchdown drives by Brady in the fourth quarter, the comeback attempt ultimately fell short, with the Eagles defense forcing a turnover on downs late to clinch the victory.

==== Week 14: at Houston Texans ====
Week Fourteen: New England Patriots at Houston Texans – Game summary

Quarter	1	2	3	4	Total
Patriots	7	10	3	7	27
Texans	3	3	0	0	6

at NRG Stadium, Houston, Texas

- Date: December 13
- Game time: 8:30 p.m. EST/7:30 p.m. CST
- Game weather: Played indoors (retractable roof closed)
- Game attendance: 71,908
- Referee: Jeff Triplette
- TV announcers (NBC): Al Michaels (play-by-play), Cris Collinsworth (color commentator) and Michele Tafoya (sideline reporter)
- Recap, Gamebook

Game information

First quarter

- NE – Keshawn Martin 2-yard pass from Tom Brady, (Stephen Gostkowski kick), 7:22. Patriots 7–0. Drive: 4 plays, 52 yards, 2:08.
- HOU – Nick Novak 37-yard field goal, 2:38. Patriots 7–3. Drive: 9 plays, 60 yards, 4:44.

Second quarter

- NE – Stephen Gostkowski 43-yard field goal, 12:13. Patriots 10–3. Drive: 11 plays, 57 yards, 5:25.
- HOU – Nick Novak 45-yard field goal, 9:26. Patriots 10–6. Drive: 7 plays, 53 yards, 2:47.
- NE – Rob Gronkowski 1-yard pass from Tom Brady, (Stephen Gostkowski kick), 0:14. Patriots 17–6. Drive: 8 plays, 41 yards, 2:31.

Third quarter

- NE – Stephen Gostkowski 49-yard field goal, 11:48. Patriots 20–6. Drive: 7 plays, 48 yards, 3:12.

Fourth quarter

- NE – James White 2-yard run (Stephen Gostkowski kick), 12:04. Patriots 27–6. Drive: 3 plays, 7 yards, 1:21.

Top passers

- NE – Tom Brady – 22/30, 226 yards, 2 TD
- HOU – Brian Hoyer – 11/22, 155 yards

Top rushers

- NE – LeGarrette Blount – 10 rushes, 53 yards
- HOU – Jonathan Grimes – 7 rushes, 53 yards

Top receivers

- NE – Rob Gronkowski – 4 receptions, 87 yards, TD
- HOU – DeAndre Hopkins – 3 receptions, 52 yards

Top tacklers

- NE – Jamie Collins – 5 tackles, 4 assists on tackles
- HOU – Kareem Jackson – 9 tackles

After the first three possessions of the game ended in punts, the Patriots struck first. Midway through the first quarter, Brady hit Gronk for a 45-yard catch-and-run to the Patriots 7. Two plays later, Brady threw a 6-yard touchdown pass to LaFell, but the play was nullified by an illegal formation penalty, pushing the ball back to the 11. Two plays later Brady threw a two-yard touchdown pass to Keyshawn Martin, which counted, and the Patriots led 7–0. The Texans reached the Patriots 20 on their ensuing drive, but were forced to settle for a 38-yard field goal by Nick Novak. The Patriots answered by reaching the Texans 25, but their stiff defense forced the Patriots to settle for a 43-yard field goal by Gostkowski. The Texans responded with a second straight field goal, this one a 45-yarder. After both teams traded punts, the Patriots took advantage of great field position (the Texans 41) and increased their lead to 17–6 with Brady's 1-yard touchdown pass to Gronkowski with just 0:14 seconds left in the half. The Patriots took the opening kickoff of the second half, and, despite only reaching the Texans 31, Gostkowski was good from 49 yards away, and the Patriots led 20–6. The Patriots forced another punt, but Martin muffed it with recovering at the Patriots 21. However, the Patriots stout defense only allowed 6 yards and the Texans turned the ball over on downs. Early in the fourth quarter, Sheard stripped Brian Hoyer with Malcolm Brown recovering at the Texans 7. Three plays later, James White scored on a two-yard touchdown run, putting the game out of reach. The Texans did nothing on their final two drives and the Patriots won the game. With the win, the Patriots improved to 11–2, and they clinched the AFC East title for a seventh straight season after the Giants defeated the Dolphins the following Monday night. Their seventh straight division title tied the Rams franchise for the most consecutive division titles won by one team in NFL history.

==== Week 15: vs. Tennessee Titans ====
Week Fifteen: Tennessee Titans at New England Patriots – Game summary

Quarter	1	2	3	4	Total
Titans	0	3	7	6	16
Patriots	7	17	3	6	33

at Gillette Stadium, Foxborough, Massachusetts

- Date: December 20
- Game time: 1:00 p.m. EST
- Game weather: 40 °F (4 °C), sunny
- Game attendance: 66,829
- Referee: Walt Coleman
- TV announcers (CBS): Ian Eagle (play-by-play), Dan Fouts (color commentator) and Evan Washburn (sideline reporter)
- Recap, Gamebook

Game information

First quarter

- NE – Rob Gronkowski 5-yard pass from Tom Brady, (Stephen Gostkowski kick), 7:10. Patriots 7–0. Drive: 11 plays, 79 yards, 6:27.

Second quarter

- NE – Akiem Hicks fumble recovery in end zone (Stephen Gostkowski kick), 13:48. Patriots 14–0.
- TEN – Ryan Succop 49-yard field goal, 9:44. Patriots 14–3. Drive: 4 plays, -5 yards, 1:40.
- NE – James White 30-yard pass from Tom Brady, (Stephen Gostkowski kick), 9:23. Patriots 21–3. Drive: 2 plays, 30 yards, 0:21.
- NE – Stephen Gostkowski 43-yard field goal, 1:44. Patriots 24–3. Drive: 8 plays, 37 yards, 3:16.

Third quarter

- TEN – Delanie Walker 7-yard pass from Zach Mettenberger, (Ryan Succop kick), 10:05. Patriots 24–10. Drive: 7 plays, 59 yards, 3:58.
- NE – Stephen Gostkowski 38-yard field goal, 5:09. Patriots 27–10. Drive: 11 plays, 60 yards, 4:56.

Fourth quarter

- TEN – Delanie Walker 57-yard pass from Zach Mettenberger, (kick failed, wr), 6:52. Patriots 27–16. Drive: 1 play, 57 yards, 0:12.
- NE – Stephen Gostkowski 42-yard field goal, 3:30. Patriots 30–16. Drive: 9 plays, 57 yards, 3:22.
- NE – Stephen Gostkowski 32-yard field goal, 1:06. Patriots 33–16. Drive: 4 plays, 2 yards, 1:08.

Top passers

- TEN – Zach Mettenberger – 20/28, 242 yards, 2 TD, 2 INT
- NE – Tom Brady – 23/35, 267 yards, 2 TD

Top rushers

- TEN – Antonio Andrews – 14 rushes, 45 yards
- NE – Joey Iosefa – 14 rushes, 51 yards

Top receivers

- TEN – Dorial Green-Beckham – 6 receptions, 113 yards
- NE – Brandon LaFell – 4 receptions, 88 yards

Top tacklers

- TEN – Avery Williamson – 5 tackles, 4 assists on tackles
- NE – Jamie Collins – 4 tackles, 4 assists on tackles, sack

After a Titans three-and-out, the Patriots put together an 11 play, 79-yard drive, with Brady hitting Gronkowski on a 5-yard touchdown pass. Three possessions later, Akiem Hicks returned a Marcus Mariota fumble 14 yards for a touchdown, increasing the Patriots lead to 14–0. After another Titans punt, Amendola fumbled with Cody Riggs recovering at the Patriots 26. The Titans could only reach the Patriots 21, but Ryan Succop got the Titans on the board with a 49-yard field goal. Keshawn Martin returned the ensuing kick 75 yards to the Titans 30. Two plays later, Brady hit White for a 30-yard touchdown, widening the lead to 21–3. Zach Mettenberger replaced Mariota on the next drive, and the Titans drove to the Patriots 38, but on 4th-and-1, Antonio Andrews stuffed for no gain. The Patriots drove to the Titans 25 and Gostkowski increased the lead to 24–3 on a 43-yard field goal. Amendola returned the ensuing punt 22 yards to the Patriots 45. The Patriots drove to the Titans 30, but Gostkowski missed the 48-yard field goal wide right, keeping the score 24–3 at halftime. After the Patriots punted, aid by an 18-yard punt return by Harry Douglas, the Titans drove 59 yards in 7 plays, with Mettenberger finding Delanie Walker for a 7-yard touchdown, trimming the deficit to 24–10. The Patriots responded by driving to the Titans 20, and Gostkowski was good from 38 yards away. Three possessions later, the Titans reached the Patriots 36, but Mettenberger was intercepted by Butler at the 2. After a Patriots three-and-out, Mettenberger hit Walker again for a 57-yard touchdown pass, with a missed extra point, making the score just 27–16. The Patriots drove to the Titans 23, and Gostkowski upped the score to 30–16 with his 41-yard field goal. The Titans drove to the Patriots 48, but Mettenberger was intercepted by Collins who returned it 51 yards to the Titans 16. Four plays later, Gostkowski hit a 32-yarder, making the score 33–16. The Titans ran out the rest of the clock to end the game. With the win, the Patriots improved to 12–2, sweeping the AFC South and clinching a first-round bye following the Broncos' loss to the Steelers later that night. New England finished 7-1 at home.

==== Week 16: at New York Jets ====
Week Sixteen: New England Patriots at New York Jets – Game summary

Quarter	1	2	3	4	OT	Total
Patriots	0	3	10	7	0	20
Jets	3	7	7	3	6	26

at MetLife Stadium, East Rutherford, New Jersey

- Date: December 27
- Game time: 1:00 p.m. EST
- Game weather: 57 °F (14 °C), cloudy
- Game attendance: 78,160
- Referee: Clete Blakeman
- TV announcers (CBS): Ian Eagle (play-by-play), Dan Fouts (color commentator) and Evan Washburn (sideline reporter)
- Recap, Gamebook

Game information

First quarter

- NYJ – Randy Bullock 30-yard field goal, 3:19. Jets 3–0. Drive: 13 plays, 79 yards, 6:58.

Second quarter

- NE – Stephen Gostkowski 35-yard field goal, 8:46. tied 3–3. Drive: 12 plays, 69 yards, 5:59.
- NYJ – Brandon Marshall 2-yard pass from Ryan Fitzpatrick, (Randy Bullock kick), 1:57. Jets 10–3. Drive: 13 plays, 80 yards, 6:49.

Third quarter

- NYJ – Brandon Marshall 33-yard pass from Ryan Fitzpatrick, (Randy Bullock kick), 9:13. Jets 17–3. Drive: 6 plays, 61 yards, 4:09.
- NE – Stephen Gostkowski 44-yard field goal, 4:54. Jets 17–6. Drive: 8 plays, 54 yards, 4:19.
- NE – Jamie Collins 14-yard fumble return (Stephen Gostkowski kick), 3:21. Jets 17–13.

Fourth quarter

- NYJ – Randy Bullock 49-yard field goal, 13:28. Jets 20–13. Drive: 9 plays, 49 yards, 4:53.
- NE – James White 9-yard pass from Tom Brady, (Stephen Gostkowski kick), 1:55. tied 20–20. Drive: 11 plays, 66 yards, 4:31.

Overtime

- NYJ – Eric Decker 6-yard pass from Ryan Fitzpatrick, 12:23. Jets 26–20. Drive: 5 plays, 80 yards, 2:37.

Top passers

- NE – Tom Brady – 22/31, 231 yards, TD, INT
- NYJ – Ryan Fitzpatrick – 26/41, 296 yards, 3 TD

Top rushers

- NE – Brandon Bolden – 9 rushes, 30 yards
- NYJ – Bilal Powell – 7 rushes, 56 yards

Top receivers

- NE – Rob Gronkowski – 4 receptions, 86 yards
- NYJ – Brandon Marshall – 8 receptions, 115 yards, 2 TD

Top tacklers

- NE – Jamie Collins – 6 tackles, 2 assists on tackles
- NYJ – Marcus Gilchrist – 8 tackles

This game is well known for the controversial coin toss to begin overtime. During the toss, New England would win the toss after choosing heads. However, they would choose to kick off to the Jets instead of receiving the ball. Captain Matthew Slater would shortly after get confused, and asked if the Patriots, because they won the toss, could also elect which way to kick. Clete Blakeman, the referee of the game, responded by saying that, because the Patriots had elected to kick, they couldn't get a second choice on what to do with the ball or which way they wanted to kick. As a result of this, the Jets got the ball first and never gave it up, winning after scoring first on their first possession with a touchdown pass from Ryan Fitzpatrick to Eric Decker.

With the loss, the Patriots fell to 12–3. This would be New England's last loss to the Jets until 2023 and their last road loss to New York until 2024. This would mark Tom Brady's final loss to the Jets in his career.

==== Week 17: at Miami Dolphins ====
Week Seventeen: New England Patriots at Miami Dolphins – Game summary

Quarter	1	2	3	4	Total
Patriots	0	3	7	0	10
Dolphins	3	7	0	10	20

at Sun Life Stadium, Miami Gardens, Florida

- Date: January 3, 2016
- Game time: 1:00 p.m. EST
- Game weather: 80 °F (27 °C), cloudy
- Game attendance: 62,918
- Referee: Ed Hochuli
- TV announcers (CBS): Kevin Harlan (play-by-play) and Rich Gannon (color commentator)
- Recap, Gamebook

Game information

First quarter

- MIA – Andrew Franks 38-yard field goal, 8:07. Dolphins 3–0. Drive: 10 plays, 54 yards, 3:43.

Second quarter

- NE – Stephen Gostkowski 34-yard field goal, 8:06. Tied 3–3. Drive: 11 plays, 48 yards, 6:01.
- MIA –DeVante Parker 15-yard pass from Ryan Tannehill (Andrew Franks kick), 0:36. Dolphins 10–3. Drive: 8 plays, 64 yards, 1:20.

Third quarter

- NE – Steven Jackson 2-yard run (Stephen Gostkowski kick), 12:32. Tied 10–10. Drive: 4 plays, 80 yards, 2:28.

Fourth quarter

- MIA – Jordan Cameron 2-yard pass from Ryan Tannehill (Andrew Franks kick), 6:58. Dolphins 17–10. Drive: 6 plays, 82 yards, 2:52.
- MIA – Andrew Franks 19-yard field goal, 1:56. Dolphins 20–10. Drive: 9 plays, 44 yards, 2:45.

Top passers

- NE – Tom Brady – 12/21, 134 yards
- MIA – Ryan Tannehill – 25/38, 350 yards, 2 TD

Top rushers

- NE – Steven Jackson – 14 rushes, 35 yards, TD
- MIA – Lamar Miller – 19 rushes, 60 yards

Top receivers

- NE – James White – 2 receptions, 63 yards
- MIA – DeVante Parker – 5 receptions, 106 yards, TD

Top tacklers

- NE – Devin McCourty – 7 tackles
- MIA – Michael Thomas – 5 tackles, 1 assist on tackles

Just days before Week 17, the Patriots acquired running back Steven Jackson, who was known for his tenure with the St. Louis Rams. The acquisition of Jackson sought to help with the team's injury-laden running game. However, his New England debut was ruined as he rushed for 35 yards and the Patriots ended up losing 20–10. This would be the Patriots' last road loss until Week 14 of the 2017 season, also in Miami. With the loss, and the Broncos win, New England clinched #2 in the AFC and finished 4-2 against the AFC East and 5-3 on the road.

=== Postseason ===
==== AFC Divisional Playoffs: vs. (5) Kansas City Chiefs ====
AFC Divisional Playoffs: (5) Kansas City Chiefs at (2) New England Patriots – Game summary

Quarter	1	2	3	4	Total
Chiefs	3	3	7	7	20
Patriots	7	7	7	6	27

at Gillette Stadium, Foxborough, Massachusetts

- Date: January 16, 2016
- Game time: 4:35 p.m. EST
- Game weather: 38 °F (3 °C), partly cloudy
- Game attendance: 66,829
- Referee: Craig Wrolstad
- TV announcers (CBS): Ian Eagle (play-by-play), Dan Fouts (color commentator) and Evan Washburn (sideline reporter)
- Recap, Gamebook

Game information

First quarter

- NE – Rob Gronkowski 8-yard pass from Tom Brady (Stephen Gostkowski kick), 10:23. Patriots 7–0. Drive: 11 plays, 80 yards, 4:37.
- KC – Cairo Santos 34-yard field goal, 1:52. Patriots 7–3. Drive: 17 plays, 64 yards, 8:31.

Second quarter

- NE – Tom Brady 1-yard run (Stephen Gostkowski kick), 3:23. Patriots 14–3. Drive: 11 plays, 98 yards, 5:36.
- KC – Cairo Santos 32-yard field goal, 0:12. Patriots 14–6. Drive: 11 plays, 52 yards, 3:11.

Third quarter

- NE – Rob Gronkowski 16-yard pass from Tom Brady (Stephen Gostkowski kick), 8:24. Patriots 21–6. Drive: 5 plays, 69 yards, 2:07.
- KC – Albert Wilson 10-yard pass from Alex Smith (Cairo Santos kick), 2:12. Patriots 21–13. Drive: 12 plays, 80 yards, 6:12.

Fourth quarter

- NE – Stephen Gostkowski 40-yard field goal, 14:46. Patriots 24–13. Drive: 8 plays, 57 yards, 2:26.
- NE – Stephen Gostkowski 32-yard field goal, 10:20. Patriots 27–13. Drive: 5 plays, 19 yards, 2:06.
- KC – Charcandrick West 1-yard run (Cairo Santos kick), 1:13. Patriots 27–20. Drive: 16 plays, 80 yards, 5:16.

Top passers

- KC – Alex Smith – 29/50, 246 yards, TD
- NE – Tom Brady – 28/42, 302 yards, 2 TD

Top rushers

- KC – Charcandrick West – 17 rushes, 61 yards, TD
- NE – Steven Jackson – 6 rushes, 16 yards

Top receivers

- KC – Jason Avant – 4 receptions, 69 yards
- NE – Julian Edelman – 10 receptions, 100 yards

Top tacklers

- KC – Eric Berry – 6 tackles, 1 assist on tackles
- NE – Logan Ryan – 8 tackles, 1 assist on tackles

The Patriots would beat the Chiefs, who came into this game having won 10 in a row to end the regular season, and a playoff game at Houston the previous week. This was the first matchup between the teams since Kansas City's 41-14 win at Arrowhead the previous season.

With the win, New England advanced to its 5th straight AFC Championship game, and faced Denver for the second time in 3 seasons.

==== AFC Championship: at (1) Denver Broncos ====
AFC Championship: (2) New England Patriots at (1) Denver Broncos – Game summary

Quarter	1	2	3	4	Total
Patriots	6	3	3	6	18
Broncos	7	10	0	3	20

at Sports Authority Field at Mile High, Denver, Colorado

- Date: January 24, 2016
- Game time: 3:05 p.m. EST/1:05 p.m. MST
- Game weather: 46 °F (8 °C), mostly sunny
- Game attendance: 77,112
- Referee: Ed Hochuli
- TV announcers (CBS): Jim Nantz (play-by-play), Phil Simms (color commentator), Tracy Wolfson, Evan Washburn and Jay Feely (sideline reporters)
- Recap, Gamebook

Game information

First quarter

- DEN – Owen Daniels 21-yard pass from Peyton Manning, (Brandon McManus kick), 7:32. Broncos 7–0. Drive: 11 plays, 83 yards, 5:30.
- NE – Steven Jackson 1-yard run (extra-point failed, wide right), 1:49. Broncos 7–6. Drive: 2 plays, 22 yards, 0:34.

Second quarter

- DEN – Owen Daniels 12-yard pass from Peyton Manning (Brandon McManus kick), 13:46. Broncos 14–6. Drive: 3 plays, 16 yards, 0:49.
- NE – Stephen Gostkowski 46-yard field goal, 14:06. Broncos 14–9. Drive: 13 plays, 48 yards, 6:44.
- DEN – Brandon McManus 52-yard field goal, 0:33. Broncos 17–9. Drive: 6 plays, 23 yards, 1:13.

Third quarter

- NE – Stephen Gostkowski 38-yard field goal, 10:26. Broncos 17–12. Drive: 8 plays, 47 yards, 2:49.

Fourth quarter

- DEN – Brandon McManus 31-yard field goal, 10:02. Broncos 20–12. Drive: 10 plays, 48 yards, 4:58.
- NE – Rob Gronkowski 4-yard pass from Tom Brady (2-point conversion failed), 0:12. Broncos 20–18. Drive: 8 plays, 50 yards, 1:40.

Top passers

- NE – Tom Brady – 27/56, 310 yards, 1 TD, 2 INT
- DEN – Peyton Manning – 17/32, 176 yards, 2 TD

Top rushers

- NE – Tom Brady – 3 rushes, 13 yards
- DEN – C. J. Anderson – 16 rushes, 72 yards

Top receivers

- NE – Rob Gronkowski – 8 receptions, 144 yards, 1 TD
- DEN – Emmanuel Sanders – 5 receptions, 62 yards

Top tacklers

- NE – Jamie Collins – 6 tackles, 2 assists on tackles
- DEN – Derek Wolfe – 6 tackles, 1 sack

Denver would lead the entire game, as their number 1 ranked defense held Tom Brady and New England's number 1 ranked offense to only 18 points. In the closing minutes of the game, the Patriots would score with only 18 seconds left in regulation on a drive where Brady exclusively targeted Gronkowski; however, during the 2-point conversion, Brady attempted to hit Edelman over the middle while Gronkowski was open and his pass was intercepted. The Patriots would then attempt an onside kick, but were unsuccessful in their attempt and the Broncos won 20–18, advancing to Super Bowl 50. This would be the last encounter between Tom Brady and Peyton Manning as Manning would retire following the season. Manning ultimately ended his career with a 3–1 record against Brady in AFC Championship games.

With the loss, the Patriots ended their season with an overall record of 13–5. This marked the last time the Patriots faced off against the Broncos in the playoffs until 2025. This also remains the last time the Patriots lost in Denver or lost to the Broncos until 2020.

== Standings ==
=== Division ===
AFC East
	W	L	T	PCT	DIV	CONF	PF	PA	STK
^{(2)} New England Patriots	12	4	0	.750	4–2	9–3	465	315	L2
New York Jets	10	6	0	.625	3–3	7–5	387	314	L1
Buffalo Bills	8	8	0	.500	4–2	7–5	379	359	W2
Miami Dolphins	6	10	0	.375	1–5	4–8	310	389	W1

=== Conference ===
AFC
#	Team	Division	W	L	T	PCT	DIV	CONF	SOS	SOV	STK
Division Leaders
1 (Note: Denver finished ahead of New England and Cincinnati for the No. 1 seed based on head-to-head sweep. New England finished ahead of Cincinnati for the No. 2 seed based on record vs. common opponents — New England's cumulative record against Buffalo, Denver, Houston and Pittsburgh was 4–1, while Cincinnati's cumulative record against the same four teams was 2–3.)	Denver Broncos	West	12	4	0	.750	4–2	8–4	.500	.479	W2
2	New England Patriots	East	12	4	0	.750	4–2	9–3	.473	.448	L2
3	Cincinnati Bengals	North	12	4	0	.750	5–1	9–3	.477	.406	W1
4	Houston Texans	South	9	7	0	.563	5–1	7–5	.496	.410	W3
Wild Cards
5	Kansas City Chiefs	West	11	5	0	.688	5–1	10–2	.496	.432	W10
6 (Note: Pittsburgh finished ahead of the New York Jets for the No. 6 seed and qualified for the last playoff spot based on record vs. common opponents — Pittsburgh's cumulative record against Cleveland, Indianapolis, New England and Oakland was 4–1, while the Jets' cumulative record against the same four teams was 3–2.)	Pittsburgh Steelers	North	10	6	0	.625	3–3	7–5	.504	.463	W1
Did not qualify for the postseason
7	New York Jets	East	10	6	0	.625	3–3	7–5	.441	.388	L1
8 (Note: Buffalo finished ahead of Indianapolis based on head-to-head victory.)	Buffalo Bills	East	8	8	0	.500	4–2	7–5	.508	.438	W2
9	Indianapolis Colts	South	8	8	0	.500	4–2	6–6	.500	.406	W2
10	Oakland Raiders	West	7	9	0	.438	3–3	7–5	.512	.366	L1
11	Miami Dolphins	East	6	10	0	.375	1–5	4–8	.469	.469	W2
12 (Note: Jacksonville finished ahead of Baltimore based on head-to-head victory.)	Jacksonville Jaguars	South	5	11	0	.313	2–4	5–7	.473	.375	L3
13	Baltimore Ravens	North	5	11	0	.313	3–3	4–8	.508	.425	L1
14	San Diego Chargers	West	4	12	0	.250	0–6	3–9	.527	.328	L2
15 (Note: Cleveland finished ahead of Tennessee based on head-to-head victory.)	Cleveland Browns	North	3	13	0	.188	1–5	2–10	.531	.271	L3
16	Tennessee Titans	South	3	13	0	.188	1–5	1–11	.492	.375	L4
Tiebreakers (Note: When breaking ties for three or more teams under the NFL's rules, they are first broken within divisions, then comparing only the highest ranked remaining team from each division.)
