= Jamie Collins (American football) =

American football player and coach (born 1989)

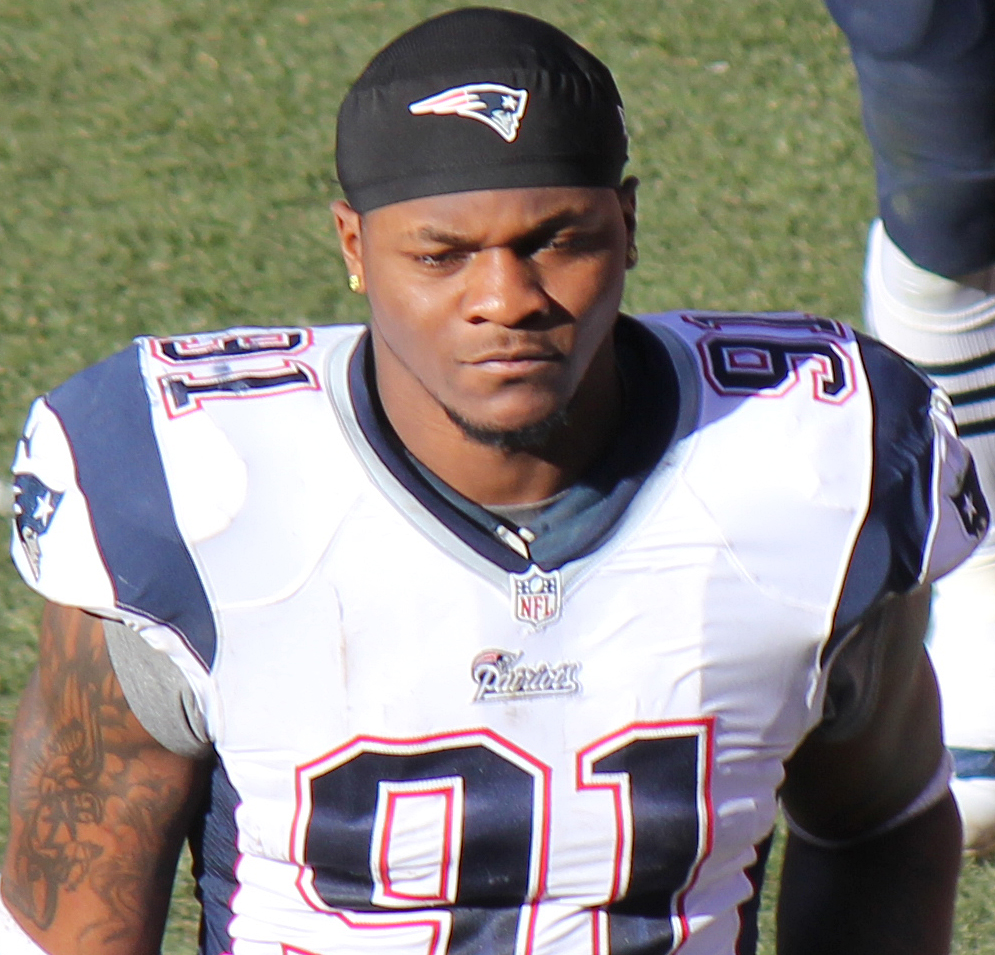
- Collins with the New England Patriots in 2014

North Carolina Tar Heels
- Title: Inside linebackers coach

Personal information
- Born: October 20, 1989 (age 37); McCall Creek, Mississippi, U.S.
- Listed height: 6 ft 3 in (1.91 m)
- Listed weight: 255 lb (116 kg)

Career information
- High school: Franklin County (Meadville, Mississippi)
- College: Southern Miss (2009–2012)
- NFL draft: 2013: 2nd round, 52nd overall pick

Career history

Playing
- New England Patriots (2013–2016); Cleveland Browns (2016–2018); New England Patriots (2019); Detroit Lions (2020–2021); New England Patriots (2021–2022)

Coaching
- North Carolina (2025–present) Inside linebackers coach

Awards and highlights
- Super Bowl champion (XLIX); Second-team All-Pro (2015); Pro Bowl (2015); NFL forced fumbles leader (2015); First-team All-C-USA (2012)

Career NFL statistics
- Total tackles: 708
- Sacks: 26.5
- Pass deflections: 39
- Interceptions: 12
- Forced fumbles: 19
- Fumble recoveries: 8
- Defensive touchdowns: 2
- Stats at Pro Football Reference

Jamie Lee Collins Sr. (born October 20, 1989) is an American football coach and former professional linebacker who is the inside linebackers coach for the North Carolina Tar Heels. He played in the National Football League (NFL) for 10 seasons, primarily with the New England Patriots. Collins played college football for the Southern Miss Golden Eagles, receiving first-team All-C-USA honors in 2012, and was selected by the Patriots in the second round of the 2013 NFL draft. As a member of the Patriots for seven non-consecutive seasons, Collins earned Pro Bowl and second-team All-Pro honors in 2015 when he led the league in forced fumbles and also won Super Bowl XLIX. Outside of his New England tenure, he played three seasons with the Cleveland Browns and two with the Detroit Lions.

== Early life ==
Collins was born in McCall Creek, Mississippi. He attended Franklin County High School in Meadville, Mississippi, where he played high school football for the Franklin County Bulldogs. He first played as a quarterback, receiver and safety before concluding his career as a quarterback and outside linebacker. He led the team to the Class 3A State Championship during his first year at quarterback, accounting for over 2,000 yards of offense and 26 touchdowns for the 2006 season. As a senior in 2007, he had over 1,200 yards rushing and 1,000 yards passing while leading his team to the state championship game. He was selected to play in the Mississippi-Alabama All-Star game, where he recorded a solo tackle.

Also, a standout track and field athlete, Collins was a state track qualifier. At the 2009 3A South State Meet, he earned first-place finishes in the shot put (51–6) and discus throw (156–0 or 47.80m), while also placing second in both the high jump (6–4 or 1.93m) and triple jump (43–10.5) events. He captured the 2009 MHSAA (Mississippi High School Athletics Association) 3A shot put title with a throw of 15.90 meters (52–1), and also took third in the triple jump after recording a career-best leap of 13.58m (44–5.25).

A three-star athlete by Rivals.com, Collins was ranked No. 68 at that position in the country and No. 21 overall in the state of Mississippi. He was a three-star prospect by Scout.com. He was named 1st team All-State by The Clarion-Ledger. He was Max Lemming's of MaxPreps.com's No. 12 combo passer in the country.

== College career ==
Collins enrolled in the University of Southern Mississippi and played for the Southern Miss Golden Eagles football team from 2009 to 2012. He played defensive back, defensive end and linebacker. During his college career, he compiled 314 tackles, 21 quarterback sacks, three interceptions and three touchdowns. He was a first-team All-Conference USA selection following his senior season in 2012.

== Professional career ==
=== Pre-draft ===
Collins entered the 2013 NFL Draft and attended the NFL Scouting Combine in Indianapolis, Indiana. He completed all of the combine and positional drills and immensely helped his draft stock with his overall performance. Collins set an NFL Combine record by finishing with a broad jump of 11'7". The record was previously 11'5" which was set by running back Justin Fargas in the 2003 NFL combine. Collins held the record until it was broken by cornerback Byron Jones in 2015 (12'3") and was also surpassed by Obi Melifonwu in 2017 (11'9"). He also finished with the second best vertical jump at the combine, fourth best short shuttle among edge rushers, and eighth best 40-yard dash time among pass rushers at the combine.

External videos
- Jamie Collins' NFL Combine Workout

On March 8, 2013, Collins participated at Southern Mississippi's pro day but opted to stand on his combine performance and only performed positional drills. At the conclusion of the pre-draft process, he was projected to be a second-round pick by NFL draft experts and scouts. Collins was ranked as the third best outside linebacker by NFL analyst Mike Mayock, the fifth best outside linebacker by NFL analyst Josh Norris, and was ranked the sixth best outside linebacker prospect in the draft by DraftScout.com.

Pre-draft measurables
Height	Weight	Arm length	Hand span	40-yard dash	10-yard split	20-yard split	20-yard shuttle	Three-cone drill	Vertical jump	Broad jump	Bench press
6 ft 3 1/2 in (1.92 m)	250 lb (113 kg)	33 3/4 in (0.86 m)	9 3/4 in (0.25 m)	4.64 s	1.64 s	2.72 s	4.32 s	7.10 s	41.5 in (1.05 m)	11 ft 7 in (3.53 m)	19 reps
All values from NFL Combine

=== New England Patriots (first stint) ===
==== 2013 ====
The New England Patriots selected Collins in the second round (52nd overall) of the 2013 NFL draft. Collins was the seventh linebacker drafted in 2013.

External videos
- Patriots draft Collins 52nd overall

On May 17, 2013, the Patriots signed Collins to a four-year, $3.75 million contract that includes $1.86 million guaranteed and a signing bonus of $1.11 million.

Collins entered training camp as a backup outside linebacker. Head coach Bill Belichick named Collins a backup outside linebacker to start the regular season, behind starters Dont'a Hightower and Jerod Mayo.

He made his professional regular season debut in the New England Patriots' season-opening 23–21 victory at the Buffalo Bills. On September 22, 2013, Collins made two combined tackles during a 23–3 win against the Tampa Bay Buccaneers in Week 3. Collins made his first career tackle on running back Doug Martin to stop a one-yard run in the fourth quarter. On October 20, 2013, Collins earned his first career start after Jerod Mayo sustained a tear to his pectoral muscle the previous week. Collins recorded five combined tackles in his first start as the Patriots lost 30–27 to the New York Jets in Week 7. In Week 12, he collected a season-high ten combined tackles (six solo) during a 34–31 win against the Denver Broncos. Collins finished his rookie season in 2013 with 43 combined tackles (24 solo) and four pass deflections in 16 games and eight starts.

The New England Patriots finished first in the AFC East with a 12–4 record and earned a first-round bye. On January 11, 2014, Collins started in his first career playoff game and recorded six combined tackles, a pass deflection, made his first career sack, and recorded his first career interception as the Patriots defeated the Indianapolis Colts in the AFC Divisional Round. The following week, he made seven combined tackles and deflected a pass in a 26–16 loss to the Denver Broncos in the AFC Championship Game.

==== 2014 ====
Collins entered training camp slated as the starting weakside linebacker after Jerod Mayo was moved to middle linebacker, following his return from injury, to replace Brandon Spikes. Head coach Bill Belichick named Collins and Dont'a Hightower the starting outside linebackers to begin the regular season.

Collins started in the New England Patriots' season-opener at the Miami Dolphins and recorded a season-high eight solo tackles and deflected a pass in their 33–20 loss. He was inactive for the Patriots' Week 2 victory at the Minnesota Vikings after sustaining a thigh injury. On October 12, 2014, Collins made four combined tackles, broke up a pass, and made his first career regular season interception during a 37–22 victory at the Buffalo Bills. Collins intercepted a pass by quarterback Kyle Orton, that was initially intended for wide receiver Marquise Goodwin, in the second quarter. The following week, he collected a season-high 13 combined tackles (seven solo) in the Patriots' 27–25 win against the New York Jets in Week 7. On November 30, 2014, Collins tied his season-high of 13 combined tackles (seven solo), recorded his first career regular season sack, and forced a fumble during a 26–21 loss at the Green Bay Packers. Collins recorded a strip/sack for a six-yard loss on quarterback Aaron Rodgers during the fourth quarter. The following game, Collins made nine combined tackles and had two sacks on quarterback Philip Rivers as the Patriots earned a 23–14 victory at the San Diego Chargers in Week 14. He finished the 2014 season with a career-high 116 combined tackles (74 solo), four sacks, four forced fumbles, and two interceptions in 15 games and 15 starts. Collins earned an overall grade of 87.9 from Pro Football Focus in 2014 and received the 11th highest grade of all the linebackers who qualified in 2014.

The New England Patriots finished atop the AFC East with a 12–4 record and earned a first-round bye and home-field advantage throughout the playoffs. On January 10, 2015, Collins made 11 combined tackles (eight solo) and deflected two passes during a 35–31 victory against the Baltimore Ravens in the AFC Divisional Round. The following week, he made four combined tackles, a pass deflection, and an interception as the Patriots defeated the Indianapolis Colts 45–7 in the AFC Championship Game. On February 1, 2015, Collins recorded eight combined tackles as the Patriots defeated the Seattle Seahawks 28–24 in Super Bowl XLIX.

==== 2015 ====
Collins, Dont'a Hightower, and Jerod Mayo were retained as the starting linebackers to start the 2015 regular season. In Week 2, Collins recorded 11 combined tackles (eight solo) and made a career-high 2.5 sacks on quarterback Tyrod Taylor during a 40–32 victory at the Buffalo Bills. On October 18, 2015, Collins made five combined tackles, a pass deflection, and blocked an extra point during the Patriots' 34–27 win at the Indianapolis Colts. Collins blocked an extra point by Adam Vinatieri in the fourth quarter after leaping over the offensive line. The following week, he collected a season-high 12 combined tackles (six solo) and a sack in the Patriots' 30–23 win against the New York Jets. On November 6, 2015, it was reported that Collins was diagnosed with an undisclosed illness and was sidelined for the next four games (Weeks 9–12). On December 4, 2015, Collins confirmed he was fully recovered from his illness. On December 22, 2015, Collins was selected to the 2016 Pro Bowl as his first Pro Bowl selection. On December 27, 2015, Collins recorded eight combined tackles and returned a fumble for his first career touchdown during a 26–20 loss at the New York Jets. Collins recovered a fumble after Jabaal Sheard stripped it from Jets' quarterback Ryan Fitzpatrick and returned it for a 14-yard touchdown in the third quarter. Collins was limited to 12 games in 2015 and made 89 combined tackles (51 solo), six pass deflections, a career-high 5.5 sacks, five forced fumbles, a fumble recovery, one interception, and a touchdown. He was selected to the 2015 AP All-Pro second team at outside linebacker, finishing fourth at that position with eight votes; he also received two votes at inside linebacker. He earned an overall grade of 91.3 from Pro Football Focus, which was the fourth highest grade among all qualifying linebackers in 2015.

The New England Patriots finished first in their division with a 12–4 record and clinched a playoff berth. They defeated the Kansas City Chiefs 27–20 in the AFC Divisional Round. On January 24, 2016, Collins recorded eight combined tackles and had two sacks on quarterback Peyton Manning as the Patriots lost 20–18 at the Denver Broncos in the AFC Championship Game.

==== 2016 ====
Defensive coordinator Matt Patricia named Collins and Jonathan Freeny the starting outside linebackers, alongside starting middle linebacker Dont'a Hightower. On September 22, 2016, Collins recorded 14 combined tackles (eight solo), a pass deflection, and an interception during a 27–0 win against the Houston Texans in Week 3. Collins was inactive during a Week 6 victory against the Cincinnati Bengals due to a hip injury.

=== Cleveland Browns ===
On October 31, 2016, Collins was traded to the Cleveland Browns for a compensatory 2017 third round draft selection. The selection was later traded to the New Orleans Saints for Brandin Cooks and used on Trey Hendrickson. Head coach Hue Jackson named Collins a starting outside linebacker opposite Cam Johnson and alongside inside linebackers Demario Davis and Christian Kirksey.

On November 6, 2016, Collins made his debut with the Cleveland Browns and recorded eight combined tackles during their 35–10 loss to the Dallas Cowboys in Week 9. On December 11, 2016, Collins collected a season-high 15 combined tackles (13 solo) and a sack in the Browns' 25–10 loss to the Cincinnati Bengals. He finished the 2016 season with a total of 112 combined tackles (79 solo), three passes defensed, three sacks, two interceptions, and two forced fumbles in 15 games and 14 starts. Pro Football Focus gave Collins an overall grade of 88.6, which ranked seventh among all qualifying linebackers in 2016.

==== 2017 ====
On January 8, 2017, the Cleveland Browns fired defensive coordinator Ray Horton after they finished with a 1–15 record in 2016. On January 23, 2017, the Cleveland Browns signed Collins to a four-year, $50 million contract with $26.40 million guaranteed and a signing bonus of $5 million.

The Cleveland Browns hired Gregg Williams as their new defensive coordinator and installed a base 4-3 defense. Head coach Hue Jackson named Collins the starting strongside linebacker to begin the regular season, along with Christian Kirksey and starting middle linebacker Joe Schobert. On September 17, 2017, Collins collected a season-high seven solo tackles before exiting in the fourth quarter of the Browns' 24–10 loss at the Baltimore Ravens due to a concussion. Collins was inactive and remained in concussion protocol for the next three games (Weeks 3–5). In Week 6, he collected a season-high eight combined tackles and deflected a pass during a 33–17 loss at the Houston Texans. On November 12, 2017, Collins made a tackle, broke up a pass, and intercepted a pass by quarterback Matthew Stafford in the Browns' 38–24 loss at the Detroit Lions. Collins left the game in the first quarter after he sustained an injury to his right knee that occurred when he was tackled by Graham Glasgow while returning his interception. On November 14, 2017, the Cleveland Browns officially placed Collins on injured reserve due to his torn MCL. Collins finished the 2017 season with 31 combined tackles (21 solo), three pass deflections, a sack, a forced fumble, and an interception in six games and six starts. Pro Football Focus gave Collins an overall grade of 35.9, which ranked 82nd among all qualifying linebackers in 2017.

==== 2018 ====
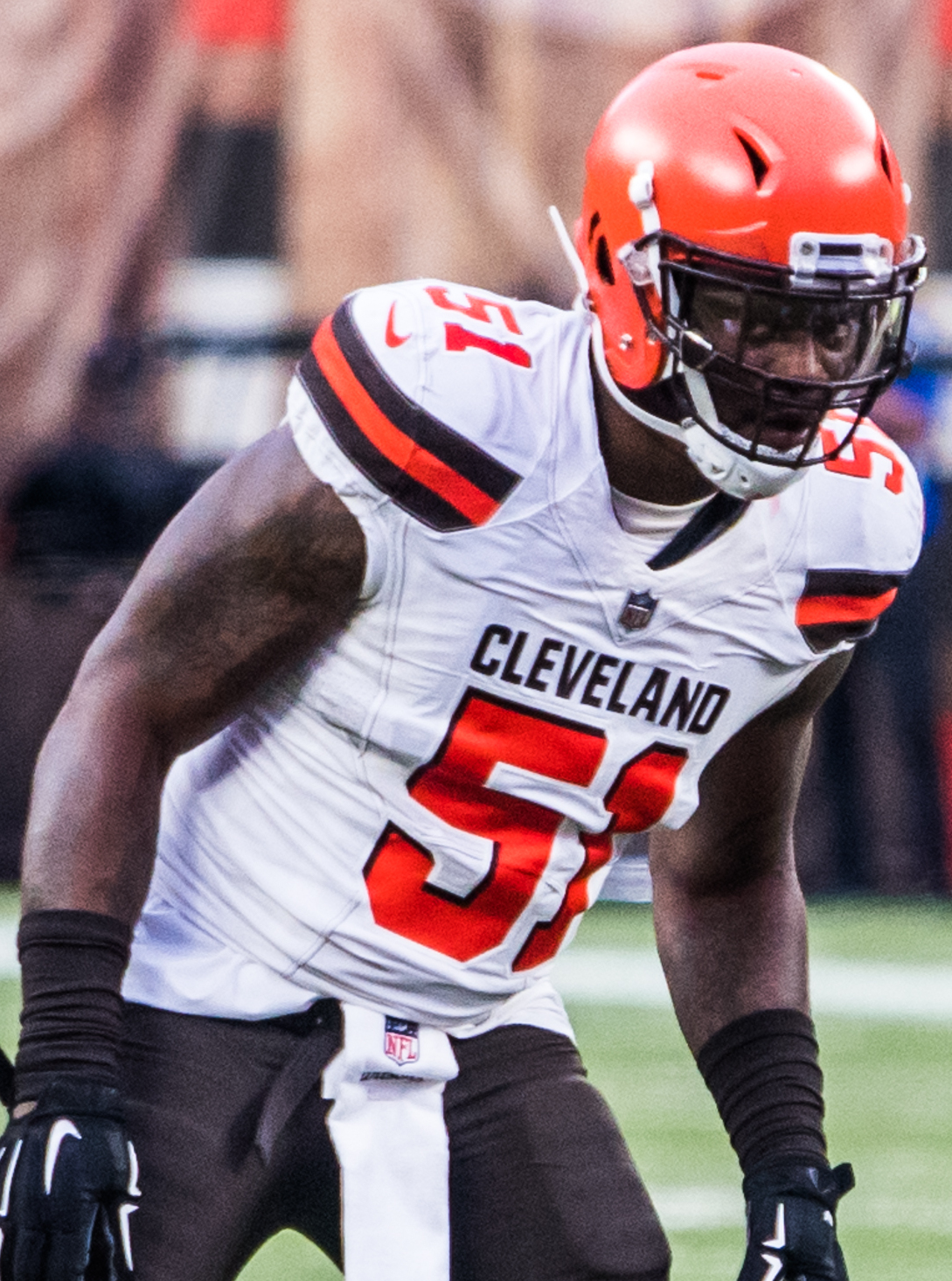
Collins in 2018

In 2018, Collins recorded 104 tackles, 4.0 sacks, a forced fumble, and an interception in sixteen games and sixteen starts. He would collect a season-high 12 tackles, including a sack, in a 12–9 win over the Baltimore Ravens. He recorded an interception in a 26–23 loss over the Tampa Bay Buccaneers. He forced a fumble in an 18–33 loss to the Pittsburgh Steelers. Pro Football Focus gave him a 62.3 overall grade in 2018.

Collins was released by the Browns on March 6, 2019.

=== New England Patriots (second stint) ===
On May 15, 2019, Collins re-signed with the Patriots on a one-year deal.

In week 2 against the Miami Dolphins, Collins made 5 tackles, half a sack, and 2 interceptions in the 43–0 win. On Collins' first interception, he picked off a pass from Ryan Fitzpatrick that was bobbled in the hands of running back Kalen Ballage and returned it for a 69-yard touchdown. Collins made his second interception off Josh Rosen as time expired in the game. In week 3 against the New York Jets, Collins sacked Luke Falk twice as the Patriots won 30–14. In week 4 against the Buffalo Bills, Collins sacked Josh Allen once and intercepted Matt Barkley late in the fourth quarter to seal a 16–10 win for the Patriots. In week 6 against the New York Giants, Collins forced a fumble on running back Jon Hilliman that was recovered by teammate Kyle Van Noy who returned the ball for a touchdown in the 35–14 win. In week 8 against his former team, the Cleveland Browns, Collins recorded a team high 13 tackles and sacked Baker Mayfield 1.5 times in the 27–13 win.

=== Detroit Lions ===
On March 25, 2020, Collins signed a three-year, $30 million contract with the Detroit Lions. Collins reunited with former New England Patriots’ defensive coordinator and Detroit Lions head coach Matt Patricia and teammates Duron Harmon and Danny Shelton.

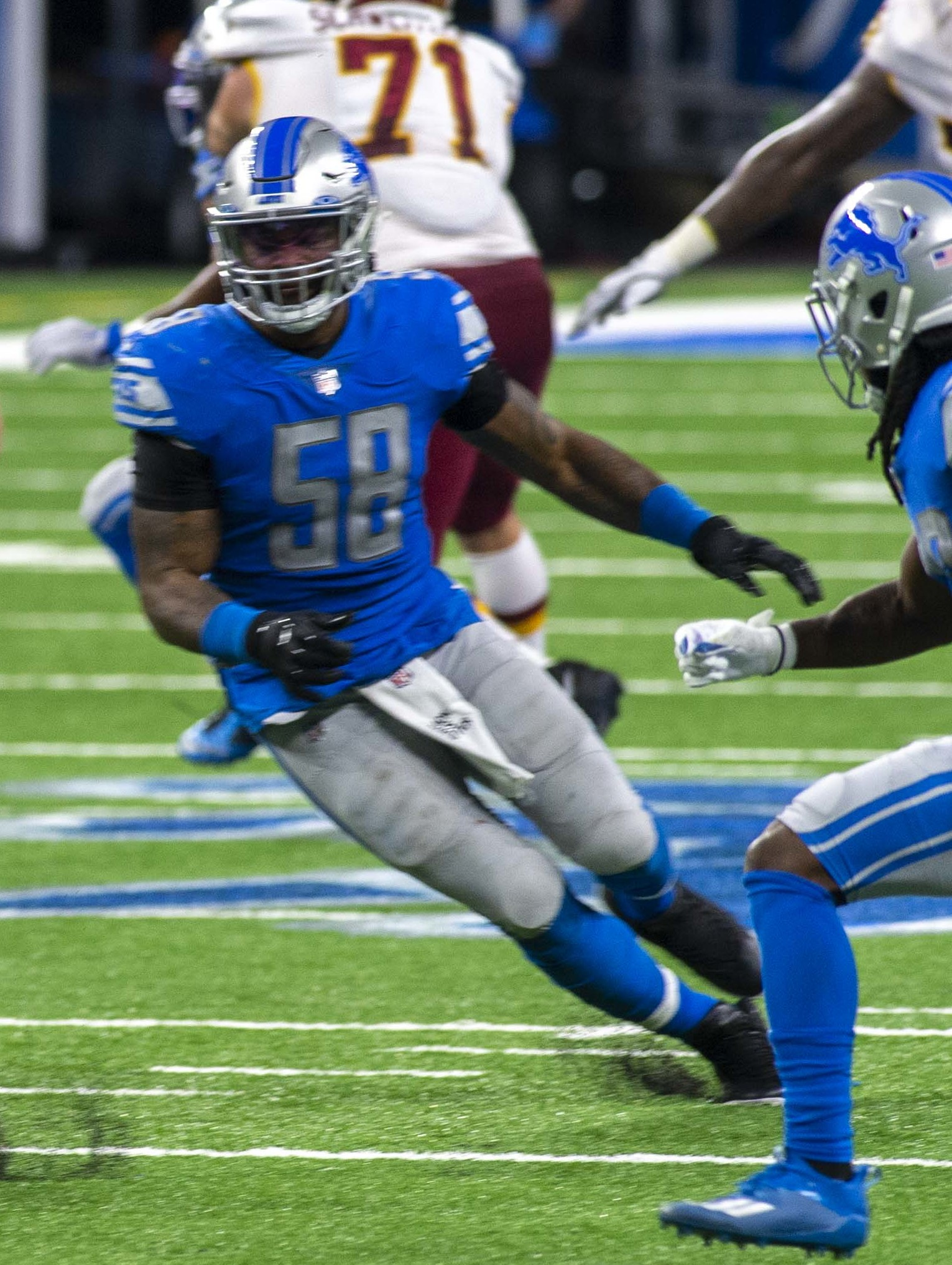
Collins with the Lions in 2020

On September 13, 2020, Collins was ejected after making contact with a referee after a play during the second quarter of a 27–23 loss to the Chicago Bears. In the following week's game against the Green Bay Packers, Collins recorded his first sack as a Lion on Aaron Rodgers during the 42–21 loss. In Week 3 against the Arizona Cardinals, Collins recorded his first interception as a Lion during the 26–23 win.

On September 28, 2021, Collins was released by the Lions after attempts to trade him had failed.

=== New England Patriots (third stint) ===
The Patriots re-signed Collins on October 6, 2021. Collins made his third debut for the Patriots in the week 5 match against the Houston Texans. He recorded a sack of Texans quarterback Davis Mills during a 25–22 road victory for the Patriots. He was placed on injured reserve on November 13. He was activated on December 6. Collins re-signed with the Patriots on October 3, 2022, to the practice squad.

=== Retirement ===
On October 6, 2023, Collins announced his retirement from the NFL.

== NFL career statistics ==
Legend
	Won the Super Bowl
	Led the league
**Bold**	Career high

=== Regular season ===
Year	Team	Games		Tackles				Fumbles			Interceptions					
Year	Team	GP	GS	Cmb	Solo	Ast	Sck	FF	FR	Yds	Int	Yds	Avg	Lng	TD	PD
2013	NE	**16**	8	43	24	19	0.0	0	1	0	0	0	0.0	0	0	4
2014	NE	15	15	**116**	**74**	42	4.0	4	**2**	3	2	0	0.0	0	0	3
2015	NE	12	12	89	51	38	5.5	**5**	1	**14**	1	51	**51.0**	51	0	6
2016	NE	7	6	43	31	12	1.0	1	0	0	2	31	15.5	18	0	3
2016	CLE	8	8	69	48	21	2.0	1	0	0	0	0	0.0	0	0	0
2017	CLE	6	6	31	21	10	1.0	1	0	0	1	0	0.0	0	0	3
2018	CLE	**16**	**16**	104	73	31	4.0	1	1	0	1	0	0.0	0	0	4
2019	NE	**16**	15	81	58	23	**7.0**	3	1	0	**3**	**85**	28.3	**69T**	**1**	**7**
2020	DET	14	14	101	55	**46**	1.0	3	1	0	1	1	1.0	1	0	6
2021	DET	2	2	10	7	3	0.0	0	1	0	0	0	0.0	0	0	0
2021	NE	10	2	20	11	9	1.0	0	0	0	1	1	1.0	1	0	3
2022	NE	3	1	2	2	0	0.0	0	0	0	0	0	0.0	0	0	0
Total		125	105	708	455	253	26.5	19	8	17	12	169	14.1	69	1	39
