= 2015 All-Pro Team =

Official list of the best NFL players in 2015

The 2015 All-Pro Teams were named by the Associated Press (AP), the Pro Football Writers of America (PFWA), the Sporting News (SN), for performance in the 2015 NFL season. While none of the All-Pro teams have the official imprimatur of the NFL (whose official recognition is nomination to the 2016 Pro Bowl (Note: The 2016 Pro Bowl represents the 2015 NFL season)), they are included in the NFL Record and Fact Book and also part of the language of the 2011 NFLPA Collective Bargaining Agreement. Any player selected to the first-team of any of the teams can be described as an "All-Pro." The AP team, with first-team and second-team selections, was chosen by a national panel of fifty NFL writers and broadcasters. The Sporting News All-NFL team is voted on by NFL players and executives and was released January 12, 2016. The PFWA team is selected by its more than 300 national members who are accredited media members covering the NFL.

== Teams ==
Offense
Position	First team	Second team
Quarterback	Cam Newton, Carolina (AP, PFWA, SN)	Carson Palmer, Arizona (AP-2)
Halfback	Adrian Peterson, Minnesota (AP, PFWA, SN); Doug Martin, Tampa Bay (AP, PFWA, SN)	Devonta Freeman, Atlanta (AP-2); Todd Gurley, St. Louis (AP-2)
Fullback	Mike Tolbert, Carolina (AP)	Patrick DiMarco, Atlanta (AP-2)
Tight end	Rob Gronkowski, New England (AP, PFWA, SN)	Greg Olsen, Carolina (AP-2)
Wide receiver	Antonio Brown, Pittsburgh (AP, PFWA, SN); Julio Jones, Atlanta (AP, PFWA, SN)	Brandon Marshall, New York Jets (AP-2); Odell Beckham Jr., New York Giants (AP-2t); DeAndre Hopkins, Houston (AP-2t)
Tackle	Andrew Whitworth, Cincinnati (AP); Joe Thomas, Cleveland (AP, PFWA, SN); Tyron Smith, Dallas (PFWA, SN)	Trent Williams, Washington (AP-2); Tyron Smith, Dallas (AP-2)
Guard	Marshal Yanda, Baltimore (AP, PFWA, SN); David DeCastro, Pittsburgh (AP); Zack Martin, Dallas (PFWA, SN)	Josh Sitton, Green Bay (AP-2); Zack Martin, Dallas (AP-2t); Mike Iupati, Arizona (AP-2t)
Center	Ryan Kalil, Carolina (AP, PFWA, SN)	Travis Frederick, Dallas (AP-2)

Special teams
Position	First team	Second team
Kicker	Stephen Gostkowski, New England (AP, PFWA, SN)	Dan Bailey, Dallas (AP-2)
Punter	Johnny Hekker, St. Louis (AP, PFWA, SN)	Sam Koch, Baltimore (AP-2)
Return specialist	Tyler Lockett, Seattle (AP); Cordarrelle Patterson, Minnesota (PFWA-KR, SN-KR); Darren Sproles, Philadelphia (PFWA-PR, SN-PR)	Cordarrelle Patterson, Minnesota (AP-2)
Special teams	Justin Bethel, Arizona (PFWA)	

Defense
Position	First team	Second team
Defensive end	Khalil Mack, Oakland (AP, PFWA, SN); J. J. Watt, Houston (AP, PFWA, SN)	Muhammad Wilkerson, New York Jets (AP-2); Ezekiel Ansah, Detroit (AP-2)
Defensive tackle	Aaron Donald, St. Louis (AP, PFWA, SN); Geno Atkins, Cincinnati (AP, PFWA, SN)	Kawann Short, Carolina (AP-2); Fletcher Cox, Philadelphia (AP-2)
Outside linebacker	Von Miller, Denver (AP, PFWA, SN); Khalil Mack, Oakland (AP-t, PFWA); Thomas Davis Sr., Carolina (AP-t); Justin Houston, Kansas City (SN)	Jamie Collins, New England (AP-2)
Inside linebacker	Luke Kuechly, Carolina (AP, PFWA, SN); NaVorro Bowman, San Francisco (AP)	Bobby Wagner, Seattle (AP-2); Derrick Johnson, Kansas City (AP-2)
Cornerback	Josh Norman, Carolina (AP, PFWA, SN); Patrick Peterson, Arizona (AP, PFWA, SN)	Richard Sherman, Seattle (AP-2); Chris Harris, Jr., Denver (AP-2t); Marcus Peters, Kansas City (AP-2t)
Safety	Eric Berry, Kansas City (AP, PFWA); Tyrann Mathieu, Arizona (AP, PFWA, SN); Earl Thomas Seattle (SN)	Reggie Nelson, Cincinnati (AP-2); Charles Woodson, Oakland (AP-2)

== Key ==
- AP = Associated Press first-team All-Pro
- AP-2 = Associated Press second-team All-Pro
- AP-2t = Tied for second-team All-Pro in the AP vote
- PFWA = Pro Football Writers Association All-NFL
- SN = Sporting News All-Pro

== Position differences ==
- AP named a fullback; SN and PFWA did not.
- AP named two inside linebackers; SN and PFWA named one.
- AP named three outside linebackers in 2015 due to a 2nd-place tie vote.
- AP named three special teams players: kicker, punter, kick returner.
- PFWA named five special teams players: K, P, KR, PR, special teams.
- SN named four special teams players: K, P, KR, punt returner.
