= Jonathan Freeny =

American football player (born 1989)

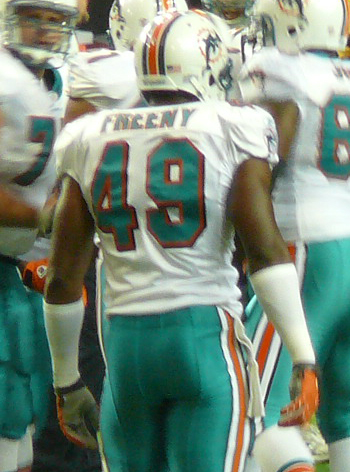
- Freeny with the Miami Dolphins in 2011

No. 55
- Position: Linebacker

Personal information
- Born: June 15, 1989 (age 37); Margate, Florida, U.S.
- Listed height: 6 ft 2 in (1.88 m)
- Listed weight: 255 lb (116 kg)

Career information
- High school: Coconut Creek (FL)
- College: Rutgers
- NFL draft: 2011: undrafted

Career history
- Miami Dolphins (2011)*; Chicago Rush (2011)*; Miami Dolphins (2011–2014); New England Patriots (2015–2016); Baltimore Ravens (2017); Jacksonville Jaguars (2017); New England Patriots (2017); New Orleans Saints (2017); Detroit Lions (2018)*
- * Offseason or practice squad member only

Awards and highlights
- Super Bowl champion (LI)

Career NFL statistics
- Total tackles: 108
- Sacks: 2
- Forced fumbles: 2
- Fumble recoveries: 2
- Pass deflections: 1
- Stats at Pro Football Reference

Jonathan Freeny (born June 15, 1989) is an American former professional football player who was a linebacker in the National Football League (NFL). He played college football for the Rutgers Scarlet Knights. He was also a member of the Miami Dolphins, Chicago Rush, Baltimore Ravens, Jacksonville Jaguars, New England Patriots, New Orleans Saints, and Detroit Lions.

== College career ==
Freeny chose to accept a scholarship to Rutgers University due to then head coach Greg Schiano's connections to South Florida from his time with the University of Miami. Freeny would play 46 games at Rutgers and primarily played at defensive end and linebacker.

== Professional career ==
=== Miami Dolphins ===
Freeny signed with the Miami Dolphins as an undrafted free agent on July 28, 2011. He was released by the team on September 3, 2011.

=== Chicago Rush ===
Freeny was assigned to the Chicago Rush on October 4, 2011. He was exempted by the Rush on December 6, 2011.

=== Miami Dolphins ===
Freeny was signed to the Dolphins' practice squad on December 7, 2011. He then spent the following 3 seasons on the Dolphins active roster. At the end of the 2014 season Freeny became a restricted free agent but was not tendered a contract by Miami and therefore became an unrestricted free agent.

=== New England Patriots ===
On March 12, 2015, Freeny signed with the New England Patriots on a one-year deal. On September 24, 2015, the Patriots extended Freeny's contract through 2016 after emerging as a core special teamer. He played in 13 regular season games with seven starts registering 43 tackles, one sack, one pass breakup, one forced fumble, two fumble recoveries and two special teams tackles.

On August 27, 2016, the Patriots signed Freeny to a two-year contract extension. He was placed on injured reserve on October 15, 2016 with a shoulder injury.

On February 5, 2017, Freeny's Patriots appeared in Super Bowl LI. In the game, the Patriots defeated the Atlanta Falcons by a score of 34–28 in overtime.

On September 2, 2017, Freeny was released by the Patriots.

=== Baltimore Ravens ===
On September 27, 2017, Freeny signed with the Baltimore Ravens. He was released on October 17, 2017.

=== Jacksonville Jaguars ===
On October 24, 2017, Freeny signed with the Jacksonville Jaguars, but was released four days later.

=== New England Patriots (second stint) ===
On December 6, 2017, Freeny was re-signed by the Patriots, but was released one week later.

=== New Orleans Saints ===
On December 14, 2017, Freeny was claimed off waivers by the New Orleans Saints.

=== Detroit Lions ===
On March 26, 2018, Freeny signed with the Detroit Lions, reuniting him with former defensive coordinator in New England, Matt Patricia. He was released on September 1, 2018.

== Personal life ==
Freeny is distant cousins with Dwight Freeney.
