= Bubba Marriott =

American football player (born 1938)

No. 23, 17
- Position: Quarterback

Personal information
- Born: December 25, 1938 (age 87); Mobile, Alabama, U.S.
- Listed height: 6 ft 0 in (1.83 m)
- Listed weight: 190 lb (86 kg)

Career information
- High school: Foley (Foley, Alabama)
- College: Troy State

Career history
- 1961–1962: New York Giants*
- 1963–1964: Montreal Alouettes
- 1965–1967: Toronto Rifles
- * Offseason or practice squad member only

Francis M. "Bubba" Marriott (born December 25, 1938) is an American former professional football player who was a quarterback for one season with the Montreal Alouettes of the Canadian Football League (CFL). He played college football for the Troy Trojans football. He was also a member of the New York Giants of the National Football League (NFL).

== Early life and college ==
Francis M. Marriott was born on December 25, 1938, in Mobile, Alabama. He attended Foley High School in Foley, Alabama.

Marriott was a four-year letterman for the Troy Trojans of Troy State College from 1957 to 1960, earning All-American honors his senior year in 1960.

== Professional career ==
Marriott was a member of the New York Giants practice squad from 1961 to 1962 after going undrafted in the 1960 NFL draft.

Marriott signed with the Montreal Alouettes to serve as the backup quarterback behind Sandy Stephens on July 29, 1963. He recorded one touchdown and ten interceptions on 81 passing attempts during the 1963 season. He was released by the Alouettes on July 31, 1964.

Marriott played for the Toronto Rifles of the Continental Football League from 1965 to 1967.

== Coaching career ==
Marriott served as head coach and general manager of the Toronto Rifles.

Marriott was later head coach of the Bramalea Satellites of the Northern Football Conference, earning coach of the year honors in 1973.
