= Julio Jones =

American football player (born 1989)

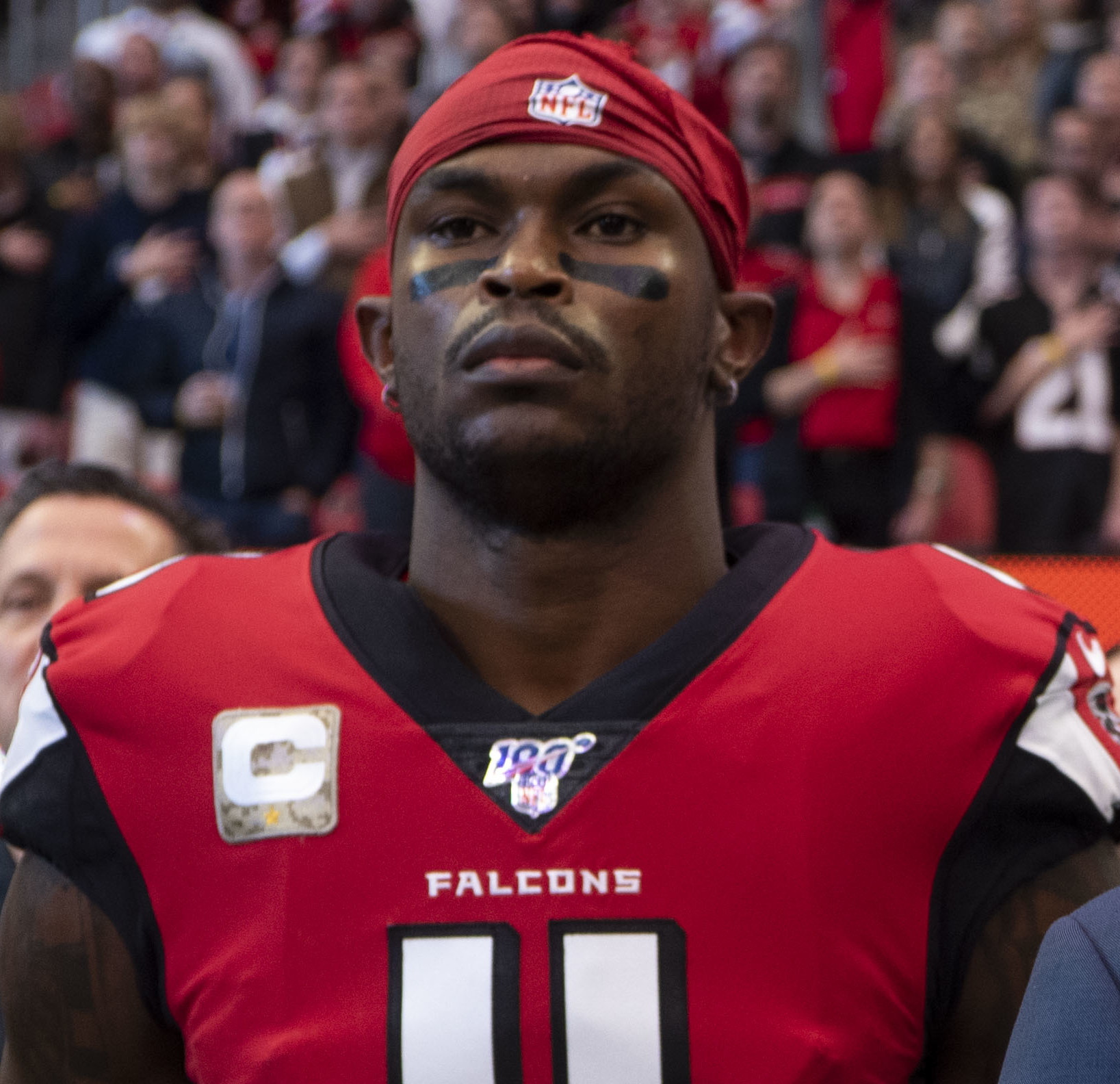
- Jones with the Atlanta Falcons in 2019

No. 11, 2, 6, 80
- Position: Wide receiver

Personal information
- Born: February 8, 1989 (age 37); Foley, Alabama, U.S.
- Listed height: 6 ft 3 in (1.91 m)
- Listed weight: 220 lb (100 kg)

Career information
- High school: Foley
- College: Alabama (2008–2010)
- NFL draft: 2011: 1st round, 6th overall pick

Career history
- Atlanta Falcons (2011–2020); Tennessee Titans (2021); Tampa Bay Buccaneers (2022); Philadelphia Eagles (2023)

Awards and highlights
- 2× First-team All-Pro (2015, 2016); 3× Second-team All-Pro (2017–2019); 7× Pro Bowl (2012, 2014–2019); 2× NFL receiving yards leader (2015, 2018); NFL receptions co-leader (2015); NFL 2010s All-Decade Team; PFWA All-Rookie Team (2011); BCS national champion (2009); Second-team All-American (2010); SEC Freshman of the Year (2008); First-team All-SEC (2010); 2× Second-team All-SEC (2008, 2009)

Career NFL statistics
- Receptions: 914
- Receiving yards: 13,703
- Receiving touchdowns: 66
- Stats at Pro Football Reference

Quintorris Lopez "Julio" Jones Jr. (/ˈhuːlioʊ/ HOO-lee-oh; born February 8, 1989) is an American former professional football player who was a wide receiver in the National Football League (NFL) for 13 seasons, primarily with the Atlanta Falcons. He played college football for the Alabama Crimson Tide, where he won a national championship in 2009. He was selected by the Falcons in the first round (sixth overall) of the 2011 NFL draft. He is regarded as one of the greatest receivers of all time.

After a productive rookie season, Jones recorded 1,198 receiving yards and ten touchdowns in 2012 and was named to his first Pro Bowl. After an injury-plagued 2013 season where he only played five games, Jones led the Falcons in receiving yards in 2014, and made his second Pro Bowl, beginning to develop a deep chemistry with team quarterback Matt Ryan. Jones broke out the next season, leading the league in receiving yards and co-leading in receptions, both of his statistics ranking top five all-time in a season. After this season, he was named to his first All-Pro selection. In 2016, Jones again had a productive year, garnering another All-Pro selection, and helped to lead the Falcons to Super Bowl LI. Over the next three seasons, Jones amassed 4,515 yards, the most by any player during that span, including leading the league again in yards in 2018.

Jones has amassed the most receiving yards by any player since entering the league, and more than any receiver in the 2010s, with 12,125 yards during that span. In doing so, Jones was invited to seven Pro Bowls, including six consecutive from 2014 to 2019, was a first-team All-Pro selection twice and was named second-team All-Pro three times.

Jones has been noted for having a rare combination of size (6 ft 3 in and 220 lbs), speed (40-yard dash in 4.39 seconds), catching ability, strength, leaping ability, and body control, which has drawn frequent comparisons to Calvin Johnson. On November 11, 2018, Jones became the fastest player in NFL history to reach 10,000 career receiving yards. On September 15, 2019, Jones became the all-time career receiving yards leader for the Falcons. On October 5, 2020, Jones became the all-time career receptions leader for the Falcons. His career average of 87.9 receiving yards per game is the sixth-highest in NFL history, and as of 2025, he is tied for third all time in career games with 100-yards receiving with 59 career games. After another injury-plagued 2020 season, Jones was traded to the Tennessee Titans in 2021 after reported disgruntlement with Atlanta's new front office. After being released by the Titans in 2022, Jones signed with the Tampa Bay Buccaneers and the Philadelphia Eagles before being released at the conclusion of the 2023 season.

== Early life ==
Julio Jones was born on February 8, 1989, as Quintorris Lopez Jones in Foley, Alabama. His mother, Queen Marvin, raised him and his brother alone, since his father left when Jones was just 5 years old. Jones grew up in a violent neighborhood. He attended Foley High School in Foley, Alabama, where he played wide receiver for the Lions high school football team. During his high school career, Jones quickly achieved recognition. In his junior year, he caught 75 passes for 1,306 yards and had 16 touchdowns. People referred to him as "Waffle House" because he was always open. He participated in the high school Under Armour All-America Game.

In addition to football, Jones was a starter on the basketball team and was a standout track athlete. He was the state champion in the long jump (24–2 or 7.40m) and triple jump (47–5 or 14.52m) in both 2006 and 2007. He was named the 2006–07 Gatorade T&F Athlete of the Year in the state of Alabama. He was the state champion in the high jump (6–6 or 1.98m) during the 2007 indoor season. He was named All-county selection in 2005, 2006, and 2007. He won Mr. Alabama Track & Field athlete of the year in 2007. He also competed as a sprinter in 2008 and posted a personal-best time of 11.13 seconds in the 100-meter dash at the Class 6A Section 1 Meet, where he placed second.

Considered a five-star recruit by Rivals.com, Jones was listed as the No. 1 wide receiver in the nation in 2008. On February 6, 2008, Jones committed to the Alabama Crimson Tide on National Signing Day, announcing his decision live on ESPNU.

== College career ==
=== 2008 season ===
In the first of three years on the Crimson Tide, Jones quickly became an impact player and a fan favorite under head coach Nick Saban. Jones became the first true freshman wide receiver ever to start in a season opener for the Crimson Tide, starting against the Clemson Tigers in the 2008 Chick-fil-A College Kickoff; Jones caught four passes for 28 yards and a touchdown in a 34–10 rout. In a 41–30 win over the #3 ranked Georgia Bulldogs, Jones had a breakout performance, catching five passes for 94 yards including a 22-yard touchdown reception from John Parker Wilson. His first 100-yard receiving game occurred in the annual rivalry game versus Tennessee, when he had six receptions for 103 yards en route to a 29–9 victory. Two weeks later, versus #16 LSU, Jones topped his previous performance with seven catches for 128 yards. His 23-yard reception in overtime set up a game-winning touchdown by John Parker Wilson, giving Alabama a 27–21 victory. In the 2008 SEC Championship Game, Jones caught five passes for 124 yards. In the first quarter, Jones caught a 64-yard pass which set up the Crimson Tide's first score of the game. However, #1 Alabama fell to No. 2 Florida by a score of 31–20, the Tide's first loss of the year. Jones finished his freshman season leading all receivers for the Crimson Tide with 58 receptions for 924 receiving yards and four receiving touchdowns.

On December 8, the Southeastern Conference announced the annual All-SEC first-team, second-team, and individual awards, as voted by the Associated Press. Jones was selected to the second-team All-SEC and named as the SEC Freshman of the Year. His performance in his freshman year drew comparisons to NFL greats. ESPN.com reported, "This guy is a unique, rare prospect for the wide receiver position with his supreme blend of size, power, speed, and agility. He reminds us of a high school version of Michael Irvin, but at this stage Jones is more explosive and faster." An NFL scout put Jones in the same category as Arizona Cardinals receiver Larry Fitzgerald, who at the time was the second-leading receiver in the NFL.

=== 2009 season ===
After experiencing what some writers called a "sophomore slump" during a slow first half to the season, Jones's production increased during the second half of the 2009 season. In a rivalry game against #9 LSU, Jones finished with four catches for 102 yards, including a 73-yard game-winning touchdown in Alabama's 24–15 victory. In the annual Iron Bowl game against rival Auburn, Jones helped in capping a come-from-behind victory, catching three third-down passes in an 8-minute, 80-yard drive that fans call "The Drive" to set up running back Roy Upchurch's game-winning touchdown in the waning minutes of the fourth quarter. Alabama continued through the regular season undefeated at 12–0, working their way to an SEC Championship matchup with the #1 Florida Gators. Jones made the first catch of the game, an 18-yard catch from McElroy. The Crimson Tide won the game 32–13, earning a chance to play for the BCS National Championship in the 2010 title game against the #2 Texas Longhorns. His 23 yards receiving led the Tide in the title game, as the passing game struggled. However, the running game again took over for 205 total rushing yards and led Alabama to a 37–21 victory.

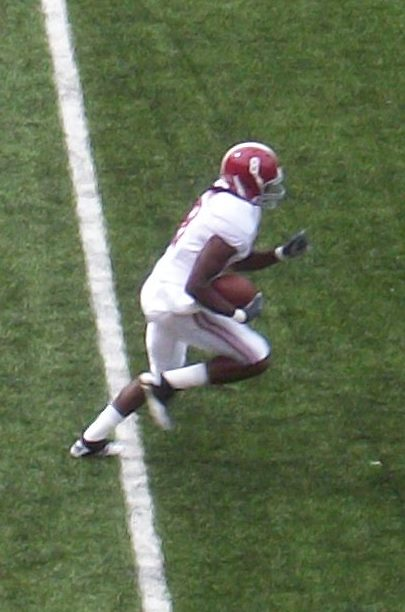
Jones in a game against Arkansas in 2010

=== 2010 season ===
Jones started the 2010 season with two games going over 100 yards and three total touchdowns in the first seven games. On October 23, Jones did well against the Tennessee Volunteers, recording 221 yards on 12 receptions in a 41–10 victory at Neyland Stadium in Knoxville, Tennessee. On November 18, against Georgia State, he recorded his first collegiate game with two receiving touchdowns in the 63–7 victory. On November 26, in the Iron Bowl against #2 Auburn, Jones had ten receptions for 199 yards and a touchdown, but the Crimson Tide lost to the Tigers by a score of 28–27. The Crimson Tide reached a bowl game, which was Jones's final collegiate game. In the 2011 Capital One Bowl against Michigan State, Jones had three receptions for 49 yards, 36 rushing yards, and a rushing touchdown in the 49–7 victory.

Jones ended his junior season with an Alabama record of 78 catches and 1,133 yards along with seven touchdowns (fourth in school history). In addition, he had eight rushes for 135 yards and two touchdowns along with five punt returns for 44 yards and five kickoff returns for 129 yards. Jones ended his Alabama career second in career receptions (179) and yards (2,653) in school history and fourth in touchdown catches (15). Jones had eight career 100-yard receiving games (second in school history). Jones was a first-team All-SEC selection in 2010.

== Professional career ==
=== Pre-draft ===
On January 7, 2011, Jones decided to forgo his senior season. Instead, he chose to declare eligibility for the 2011 NFL draft with teammates Mark Ingram, Greg McElroy, and Marcell Dareus. Jones was later invited to the "All-Star Football Challenge", a skill contest shown by ESPN on February 4. At the 2011 NFL Combine, he posted the longest long jump and the third-fastest 40-yard dash among wide receivers despite having a broken bone in his foot.

Pre-draft measurables
Height	Weight	Arm length	Hand span	Wingspan	40-yard dash	10-yard split	20-yard split	20-yard shuttle	Three-cone drill	Vertical jump	Broad jump	Bench press	Wonderlic
6 ft 2 3/4 in (1.90 m)	220 lb (100 kg)	33 3/4 in (0.86 m)	9 3/4 in (0.25 m)	6 ft 9 3/4 in (2.08 m)	4.39 s	1.53 s	2.54 s	4.25 s	6.66 s	38.5 in (0.98 m)	11 ft 3 in (3.43 m)	17 reps	15
All values from NFL Combine

=== Atlanta Falcons ===
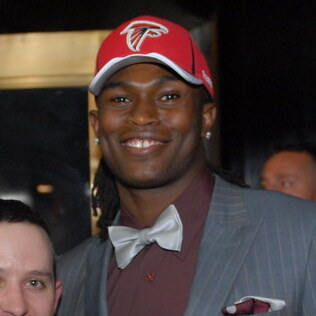
Jones at the 2011 NFL draft

The Atlanta Falcons selected Jones with the sixth overall pick of the 2011 NFL Draft despite already having Pro Bowl receiver Roddy White. Jones became the earliest drafted wide receiver in franchise history for the Falcons. The Falcons traded five draft picks to the Cleveland Browns to move up into their spot and take Jones, giving up their 27th, 59th, and 124th picks from the 2011 Draft, and their first and fourth-round picks from the 2012 NFL draft. Due to the work stoppage at the time of the draft which prevented teams from using players in draft day trades, Falcons general manager Thomas Dimitroff found it difficult having to use only draft picks to trade up from the number 27th overall pick to the sixth overall pick. "We knew it was going to be an aggressive move and cost us," Dimitroff said. "As an organization we felt very strongly about the move for a player who truly adds the explosive, urgent athleticism we're looking for to improve on this team." He was the second wide receiver to be taken in the 2011 NFL Draft, behind only A. J. Green of the Georgia Bulldogs, who was selected fourth overall by the Cincinnati Bengals. In addition, he was one of five Alabama Crimson Tide players to be selected that year. Jones wore number 11 with the Falcons.

==== 2011 season ====
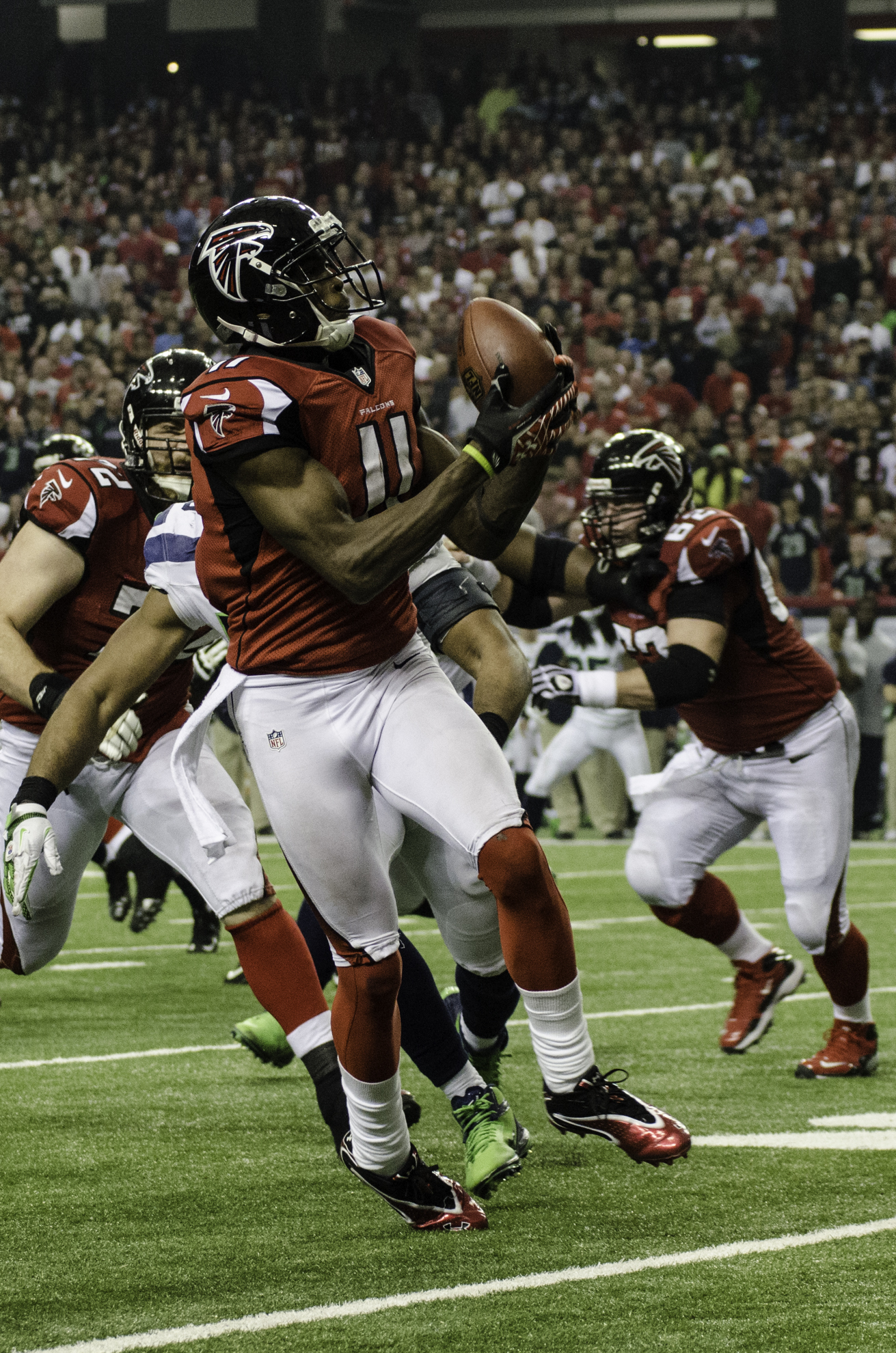
Jones playing for the Atlanta Falcons against the Seattle Seahawks in the divisional round of the 2012 NFL playoffs

Jones came to terms with the Atlanta Falcons on July 28, 2011, signing a four-year contract worth $16.2 million, all of which was guaranteed. His NFL debut came against the Chicago Bears at Soldier Field. In the 30–12 loss, Jones had five receptions for 71 yards. In Week 3 against the Tampa Bay Buccaneers, Jones had six receptions for 115 yards in the Falcons 16–13 loss, his first game with 100+ yards. In Week 4, against the Seattle Seahawks, Jones had 11 receptions for 127 yards in the 30–28 victory. He recorded his first two receiving touchdowns on Week 9 against the Indianapolis Colts in a 31–7 victory. Jones's first touchdown was a 50-yard reception from quarterback Matt Ryan in the first quarter, and the second touchdown was an 80-yard reception from Ryan in the second quarter. After having quiet games against the New Orleans Saints and the Minnesota Vikings, and being inactive during a game against the Tennessee Titans, Jones bounced back against the Houston Texans with four receptions for 68 yards in the 17–10 loss. The following week, Jones had another strong game with three receptions for 104 yards and two touchdowns of 75 yards and 17 yards. Both of his touchdowns were in the 4th quarter, allowing the Falcons to close out a 31–23 victory against the Carolina Panthers. Over the last three games of his season, Jones recorded games of five receptions for 85 yards and a touchdown, eight receptions for 128 yards and a touchdown, and four receptions for 76 yards and two touchdowns. Overall, in 13 games played, Jones finished his rookie season with 393 receiving yards and six touchdowns over the last four games of the regular season. He finished the season leading all rookies in touchdown receptions with eight, while his 54 receptions for 959 receiving yards ranked him second among rookies in yards, behind A. J. Green of the Bengals and third in catches behind Green and Greg Little of the Browns. Jones was named to the PFWA All-Rookie Team for the 2011 season. The Falcons made the playoffs with a 10–6 regular season record to earn the #5-seed in the playoffs. In his playoff debut, Jones had seven receptions for 64 yards in a 24–2 Wild Card Round loss to the eventual Super Bowl champion New York Giants.

==== 2012 season ====
Jones started his second professional season against the Kansas City Chiefs with six receptions for 108 yards and two touchdowns in the 40–24 victory. Against the Philadelphia Eagles in Week 8, Jones had five receptions for 123 yards and a touchdown in the 30–17 victory. The following week, he backed up his performance against the Eagles with five receptions for 129 yards against the Dallas Cowboys in the 19–13 victory. On October 25, against the Tampa Bay Buccaneers, Jones had six receptions for 147 yards and an 80-yard touchdown reception in the 24–23 victory in Week 12. On December 16, against the defending Super Bowl champion Giants, Jones had six receptions for 74 yards and two touchdowns in the 34–0 victory in Week 15. The Falcons finished the season with a 13–3 regular season record and earned the top seed in the NFC for the NFL playoffs. In the Divisional Round against the Seahawks, Jones recorded his first career interception on the last play of the game defending a Hail Mary pass attempt from quarterback Russell Wilson. In addition, he recorded six receptions for 59 yards in the 30–28 victory. In the NFC Championship against the San Francisco 49ers, Jones had 11 receptions for a then career-high 182 yards and two touchdowns in the 28–24 loss. In the 2012 regular season, Jones had 79 receptions for 1,198 receiving yards and 10 touchdowns, his first season going over 1,000 receiving yards and setting a career high in single-season touchdown receptions. As a result, he was selected for the 2013 Pro Bowl, which was his first Pro Bowl nomination. Jones and fellow wide receiver Roddy White were the first 1,000-yard receiving tandem the Falcons have had since 1998 (Tony Martin and Terance Mathis). He was ranked 26th by his fellow players on the NFL Top 100 Players of 2013.

==== 2013 season ====
Jones started the 2013 season with a relatively solid performance against the Saints with seven receptions for 76 yards and a touchdown in the 23–17 loss. The following week, Jones had 11 receptions for 182 yards, including an 81-yard touchdown catch against St. Louis Rams. Over the next two games, Jones continued his hot streak with nine receptions for 115 yards against the Miami Dolphins and six receptions for a 108-yard performance against the New England Patriots. However, on October 7, 2013, Jones fractured his foot in the Week 5 Monday Night Football loss to the New York Jets and was ruled to be out for the season. In that last game, Jones had eight receptions for 99 yards. Jones managed to finish 76th in receiving yards among 458 qualified players for the 2013 season, with 41 receptions for 580 yards and two touchdowns. If Jones had played a full sixteen-game season and kept up his average of 116 yards and 8.2 receptions per game, he would have totaled 1,856 yards off of 131 receptions, which would have led the league in both categories. The Falcons finished with a losing regular season record and failed to make the playoffs.

==== 2014 season ====
On April 29, 2014, the Falcons accepted the fifth-year option of Jones's rookie contract, extending his obligations with the team through the 2015 season. Jones started the 2014 season with a seven-reception 116-yard performance against the Saints at the Georgia Dome. In Week 3, against the Buccaneers on Thursday Night Football, Jones had nine receptions for 161 yards and two touchdowns in the 56–14 victory. On November 30, Jones set a new career-high with ten receptions for 189 yards in the 29–18 victory over the Cardinals. The following week on Monday Night Football, he once again broke his career single-game receiving record, recording 259 yards on 11 receptions in the 43–37 loss to the Green Bay Packers, his first career game with over 200 yards receiving. In the loss, Jones had a reception for 79 yards and a touchdown reception of 22 yards, and in total he recorded the fourth-most receiving yards in a Monday Night Football game. In Week 16 against the New Orleans Saints, Jones had seven receptions for 107 yards in the 30–14 victory. He finished the season with 104 receptions, Jones' first time having over 100 receptions in a season, for 1,593 yards, first in the NFC in both categories and third in the entire NFL. He was named to the Pro Bowl for the 2014 season. The Falcons finished with a regular season record of 6–10 and failed to make the playoffs for the second consecutive year. He was later ranked 13th by his fellow players on the NFL Top 100 Players of 2015.

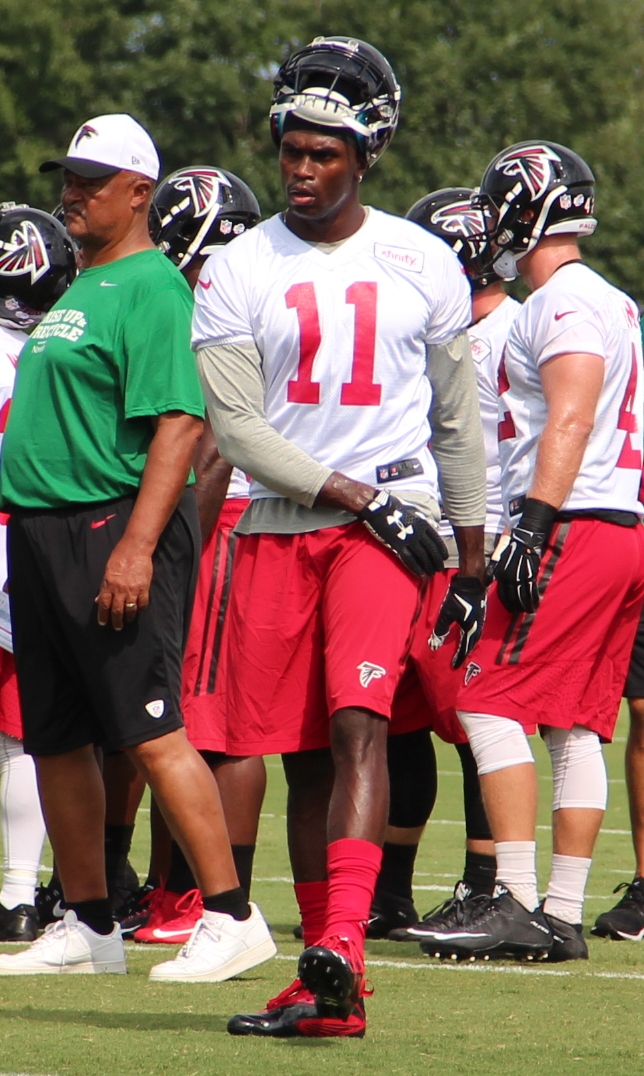
Jones in 2015 at training camp

==== 2015 season ====
On August 29, 2015, the Falcons signed Jones to a 5-year, $71.5 million extension with $47 million guaranteed. Jones started the 2015 season against the Eagles on Monday Night Football. In the 26–24 victory, Jones had nine receptions for 141 yards and two touchdowns to earn his first NFC Offensive Player of the Week honor. After a career-high 13 receptions for 135 yards in a 24–20 victory over the Giants in Week 2, Jones recorded a 164-yard and two-touchdown performance in the 39–28 victory over the Cowboys. Jones was targeted a career-high 20 times in the victory. In Week 5, against the Washington Redskins, Jones had five receptions for 67 yards while scoring a touchdown on an offensive fumble recovery in the end zone in the 25–19 victory. In Week 7 against the Titans, Jones had nine receptions for 92 yards and an 8-yard touchdown reception in the 10–7 victory. In Week 8 in a 23–20 loss to the Buccaneers, Jones had 12 receptions for 162 yards and a touchdown. After recording ten receptions for 137 yards in a performance in a 17–16 loss to the 49ers the following week, Jones recorded nine receptions for 160 yards in a 24–21 loss to the Colts. In Week 15, against the Jacksonville Jaguars, Jones had nine receptions for 118 yards and two touchdowns. The following week, Jones had nine receptions for 178 yards and a touchdown in a 20–13 victory over the Panthers to earn NFC Offensive Player of the Week. In the season finale against the Saints, Jones finished the season with nine receptions for 149 yards in the 20–17 loss. Jones finished the 2015 season with 1,871 receiving yards, a Falcons franchise record and the third-highest in NFL history, behind Cooper Kupp (1,947 receiving yards in 2021 for the Los Angeles Rams), and Calvin Johnson (1,964 receiving yards in 2012 for the Detroit Lions). Jones had a franchise-record 136 receptions, tying with Antonio Brown of the Pittsburgh Steelers for the most receptions that season and the third-highest in NFL history; behind Michael Thomas(149 receptions in 2019 with the Saints), Cooper Kupp (145 receptions in 2021 with the Rams), and Marvin Harrison (143 receptions in 2002 with the Colts). Jones also became the first wide receiver since the Super Bowl started to lead the league in total yards from scrimmage. He was selected to the 2015 Pro Bowl, the third of his career, and earned first-team All-Pro honors for the first time. He was ranked by his fellow players as the eighth-best player on the NFL Top 100 Players of 2016. His season is regarded as one of the greatest seasons ever recorded by a wide receiver. The Falcons finished with an 8–8 regular season record and failed to make the playoffs for the third consecutive year.

==== 2016 season: Super Bowl appearance ====
Jones started the season with one 100-yard game in the month of September, a 2–1 stretch for the Falcons. In Week 4, Jones caught 12 passes for a Falcons-record 300 yards, the most ever against the Panthers, and a touchdown in a 48–33 victory over the Panthers. His performance against the Panthers made Jones the sixth player in NFL history ever to have at least 300 receiving yards in a game. He earned NFC Offensive Player of the Week. In addition, Matt Ryan threw for 503 passing yards, making them the first quarterback/wide receiver duo to gain at least 500 passing yards and 300 receiving yards in a single NFL game. Over the remainder of the season, Jones went over the 100-yard mark five times, including a 174-yard game against the San Diego Chargers in Week 7. Jones finished the 2016 season with 83 receptions on 129 targets for 1,409 yards and six touchdowns. His 17.0 yards per reception and 10.9 yards per target were career highs. Jones was selected to his third consecutive and fourth career Pro Bowl and was named first-team All-Pro for the second consecutive year. He was also ranked third by his peers on the NFL Top 100 Players of 2017 as the highest-ranked wide receiver. The Falcons made the playoffs in the 2016 season with a 11–5 regular season record and had the #2 seed in the NFC. In the Divisional Round against the Seahawks, Jones had six receptions for 67 yards and a touchdown in the 36–20 victory at the Georgia Dome. In the NFC Championship against the Packers, Jones had nine receptions for 180 yards and two touchdowns in the 44–21 victory. During Super Bowl LI against the Patriots, Jones had four receptions for 87 receiving yards on four targets. Late in the game, with the Falcons leading 28–20, Jones recorded what Adam Kilgore of The Washington Post called an "iconic catch" from Ryan to put the Falcons on the Patriot's 22-yard line. However, a subsequent sack and holding penalty caused the Falcons to lose field position and move out of game-sealing field goal range, forcing them to punt the ball back to New England. The Patriots would score on the ensuing drive and would tie on a two-point conversion 28–28. After winning the coin toss in overtime, the Patriots would score a walk-off touchdown to win the game 34–28, completing the largest comeback in Super Bowl history.

==== 2017 season ====
In the 2017 season's first five games, Jones had one game going over 100 yards. In Week 7, in a loss to the Patriots in a Super Bowl LI rematch, Jones recorded his first receiving touchdown of the 2017 season, a one-yard reception from Ryan. During Week 12 against the Buccaneers, Jones had another career performance with 12 receptions for 253 receiving yards and two touchdowns, of which one was thrown from fellow receiver Mohamed Sanu, as the Falcons won 34–20. His performance in Week 12 earned him NFC Offensive Player of the Week. Jones became the first player in NFL history with three games with at least 250 receiving yards and the tenth to record three games with at least 200. On December 19, 2017, Jones was named to his fifth Pro Bowl. In the Week 17 regular-season finale against the Saints, Jones had seven receptions for 149 yards in the 23–13 loss. Jones was later named to second-team All-Pro for the first time in his career. Overall, he finished the 2017 season with 88 receptions for 1,444 receiving yards and three receiving touchdowns. The Falcons made the playoffs and faced off against the Rams in the Wild Card Round. Against the Rams, Jones had nine receptions for 94 yards and a touchdown in the 26–13 victory. In the Divisional Round against the Eagles, Jones had nine receptions for 101 yards, but the Falcons lost by a score of 15–10. He was targeted in the endzone on the Falcons' final offensive play but failed to catch it. He was ranked fourth by his fellow players on the NFL Top 100 Players of 2018.

==== 2018 season ====
In the season-opener against the defending Super Bowl champions the Eagles, Jones recorded 10 receptions for 169 yards to go with an 11-yard rush in the 12–18 loss. In the loss, Jones became the first player in franchise history to record 40 games with at least 100 receiving yards, breaking his tie with Roddy White. In Week 4, he recorded nine receptions for 173 yards in the 37–36 loss to the Bengals. In Week 6, against the Buccaneers, Jones had 10 receptions for 144 yards in the 34–29 victory. In Week 9 against the Redskins, Jones caught seven passes for 121 yards and his first receiving touchdown of the season. In Week 10, against the Browns, Jones recorded seven receptions for 107 yards and a touchdown. In that game, Jones became the fastest player in NFL history to reach 10,000 career receiving yards, accomplishing the feat in 104 games, beating out Calvin Johnson, who took 115 games. In the following game against the Cowboys, Jones had six receptions for 118 yards and a touchdown in the loss. In Week 12, against the Saints on Thanksgiving, Jones had 11 receptions for 147 yards in the 31–17 loss. In Week 14, against the Packers, Jones had eight receptions for 106 yards and two touchdowns. Jones eclipsed 1,400 yards and became the first player in NFL history to register five consecutive seasons with at least 1,400 yards. In Week 17, against the Buccaneers, Jones had 138 yards and a touchdown in the 34–32 victory. On December 18, 2018, Jones was named to his sixth Pro Bowl, which he declined due to injury. Jones was later named to another second-team All-Pro after the season. Jones finished the 2018 season with 113 receptions for a league-leading 1,677 yards and eight receiving touchdowns. Jones was the only player during the 2018 season to average more than 100 receiving yards per game with 104.8 yards per game. Despite not recording a single touchdown reception during the first eight weeks of the season, Jones had eight touchdown catches in the final eight weeks of the season. He was ranked ninth by his fellow players on the NFL Top 100 Players of 2019.

==== 2019 season ====
On September 7, 2019, Jones signed a three-year, $66 million extension with $64 million guaranteed, making him the highest-paid wide receiver in the league at the time. In Week 2 against the Eagles, Jones recorded five receptions for 106 yards and two touchdowns as the Falcons won 24–20. Jones' second touchdown occurred on fourth down with two minutes left in the game. On the play, quarterback Matt Ryan threw a short pass to Jones which he ran in for a 54-yard touchdown that ended up sealing a Falcons victory. In this game, Jones became the Falcons all-time receiving yard leader, surpassing the record previously set by Roddy White. In Week 3 against the Colts, Jones caught eight passes for 128 yards and one touchdown as the Falcons lost 24–27. In Week 4, Jones became the fastest player in NFL history to reach 11,000 career receiving yards, doing so in 115 games, beating out Calvin Johnson, who took 127 games. In Week 8 against the Seahawks, Jones had 10 receptions for 152 yards in the 27–20 loss. Jones had to miss the Week 12 game against the Saints due to a shoulder injury. In Week 15 against the 49ers, Jones had a season-high 13 receptions for 134 receiving yards and two touchdowns, the latter of which was the game-winner, in the 29–22 victory. In Week 16 against the Jaguars, Jones was targeted a career-high 20 times and recorded 10 receptions for a season-high 166 yards as the Falcons won 24–12. In the game, Jones became the fastest player in NFL history to reach 12,000 career receiving yards, accomplishing the feat in 125 games, beating out Jerry Rice, who took 142 games. Jones finished the 2019 season with 99 receptions for 1,394 receiving yards and six receiving touchdowns. Jones scored four of those touchdowns in his first three games but did not score another touchdown for nine games and did not score another touchdown for the rest of the season from that point. However, Jones still finished 26th out of all qualified receivers in that category. He finished second in the league in receiving yards and sixth in receptions. He earned his seventh career nomination to the Pro Bowl and second-team All-Pro, but he elected not to go. Jones was ranked 11th by his fellow players on the NFL Top 100 Players of 2020.

==== 2020 season ====
During Week 1 against the Seahawks, Jones caught nine of 12 targets for 157 yards as the Falcons lost 25–38. He surpassed 800 career receptions during this game. In Week 4 against the Packers on Monday Night Football, Jones was forced to exit the game due to a hamstring injury during the 16–30 loss. In that game, Jones became the Falcons all-time career receptions leader, surpassing the record previously set by Roddy White. In Week 6 against the Vikings, Jones had eight receptions for 137 yards and his first two receiving touchdowns of the season during the 40–23 victory. In Week 8 against the Panthers on Thursday Night Football, Jones had seven receptions for 137 yards in the 25–17 victory. In Week 13, against the Saints, Jones suffered a setback in regard to his hamstring. He was inactive for the 2020 season's final four games. Playing nine out of 16 games due to injury, Jones still managed to finish 41st in receiving yards among 499 qualified players for the 2020 season, finishing the 2020 season with 51 receptions for 771 receiving yards and three receiving touchdowns. On May 22, 2021, a photo of Jones wearing a Cowboys sweatshirt made him the subject of trade rumors on social media. On May 24, 2021, Shannon Sharpe called Jones while live on Skip and Shannon: Undisputed and asked him if he wanted to remain with the Falcons for the upcoming season. In response to Sharpe's question, Jones said: "I'm out of there". Jones also told Sharpe that he had no desire to be a Cowboy and that he wanted to play for a winning organization. He was ranked 29th by his fellow players on the NFL Top 100 Players of 2021.

=== Tennessee Titans ===
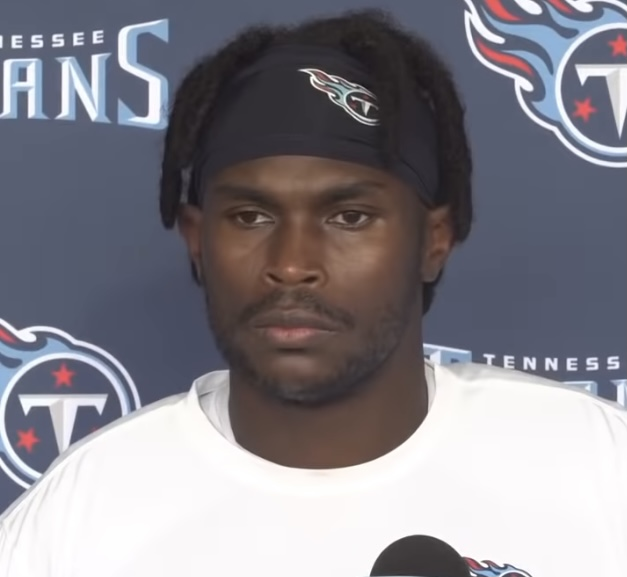
Jones with the Tennessee Titans in 2021

On June 6, 2021, the Falcons traded Jones along with a sixth-round selection in the 2023 NFL draft to the Titans for their second-round selection in the 2022 NFL draft and their fourth-round selection in the 2023 Draft. Jones elected to wear jersey No. 2 with the Titans due to jersey No. 11 being taken by fellow receiver A. J. Brown. On September 18, 2021, Jones was fined $10,815 for getting into a scuffle with defensive back Byron Murphy during the season opener against the Cardinals, in which the Titans lost 38–13. The following week against the Seahawks, Jones had his only game of the season with over 100 yards receiving, with six receptions for 128 yards, all recorded in the first half in the 33–30 victory in overtime In the game, Jones had a reception of 51 yards and had a controversial touchdown that was called back after the officials ruled that his right foot did not land fully in bounds while making the catch. In Week 6 against the Buffalo Bills, Jones had three receptions for 59 yards in the 34–31 victory. He gained most of those yards off of a 48-yard reception that he caught after the ball bounced off the helmet of defensive back Micah Hyde. Jones was placed on injured reserve with a hamstring injury on November 13, 2021. He was activated on December 11. Since Week 2, Jones had not had a game where he posted more than 60 yards receiving or more than five receptions. He recorded his only receiving touchdown of the season in Week 18 against the Texans in the final game of the regular season. The Titans were victorious 28–25. In an injury-riddled season, Jones finished the regular season with 31 receptions for 434 receiving yards and a receiving touchdown. The Titans clinched the number one seed in the AFC with a 12–5 regular season record. In Jones' first postseason game in four seasons, in the Divisional Round against the Bengals, Jones had statistically his best game since Week 2 of the regular season, with six receptions for 62 yards as the Titans lost 19–16. On March 16, 2022, Jones was released from the Titans.

=== Tampa Bay Buccaneers ===
On July 27, 2022, Jones signed a one-year contract with the Buccaneers. Jones made his Buccaneers debut in Week 1 against the Cowboys, a 19–3 victory for Tampa Bay. Following Week 1, Jones was sidelined with a partially torn PCL and missed significant playing time. In Week 8, Jones scored his first touchdown with the Buccaneers on an eight-yard reception from Tom Brady in the 27–22 loss to the Baltimore Ravens. In Week 10 in a game hosted in Munich, Jones posted a productive game with three receptions for 53 yards and a touchdown in a 21–16 victory over the Seahawks. His 31-yard touchdown became the first ever touchdown scored in an NFL game in Germany. Jones played in 10 total games in the 2022 regular season. He recorded 24 receptions for 299 receiving yards and two receiving touchdowns.

Jones and the Buccaneers were knocked out of the Wild Card Round by the Cowboys on January 16, 2023. In the 31–14 loss, Jones had seven receptions for 74 receiving yards and one receiving touchdown. Following the end of the season, Jones was not resigned and became an unrestricted free agent.

=== Philadelphia Eagles ===
On October 17, 2023, the Eagles signed Jones to their practice squad. On October 21, Jones was elevated from their practice squad for the Dolphins game, where he had one reception for 3 yards. Eight days later, he recorded his first receiving touchdown as an Eagle in an away game against the Washington Commanders. He was signed to the active roster on November 1. In Week 17 against the Cardinals, Jones recorded two receiving touchdowns as the Eagles lost, 35–31. In the 2023 regular season, Jones appeared in 11 games and started four. He had 11 receptions for 74 receiving yards and three receiving touchdowns. With five minutes remaining in the first half of the Wild Card game against the Buccaneers, Jones got a concussion due to a collision with Zyon McCollum.

On April 4, 2025, Jones announced his retirement from the league.

== Career statistics ==
Legend
	Led the league
**Bold**	Career high

=== NFL ===
==== Regular season ====
Year	Team	Games		Receiving							Rushing					Fumbles	
Year	Team	GP	GS	Rec	Yds	Avg	1D	Y/G	Lng	TD	Att	Yds	Avg	Lng	TD	Fum	Lost
2011	ATL	13	13	54	959	**17.8**	36	73.8	80	8	**6**	**56**	9.3	**19**	0	1	1
2012	ATL	16	15	79	1,198	15.2	56	74.9	80	**10**	**6**	30	5.0	18	0	0	0
2013	ATL	5	5	41	580	14.1	25	116.0	**81**	2	1	7	7.0	7	0	2	1
2014	ATL	15	15	104	1,593	15.3	76	106.2	79	6	1	1	1.0	1	0	2	1
2015	ATL	16	16	**136**	**1,871**	13.8	**93**	**116.9**	70	8	—	—	—	—	—	**3**	1
2016	ATL	14	14	83	1,409	17.0	64	100.6	75	6	—	—	—	—	—	0	0
2017	ATL	16	16	88	1,444	16.4	67	90.3	53	3	1	15	**15.0**	15	0	0	0
2018	ATL	16	16	113	1,677	14.8	80	104.8	58	8	2	12	6.0	11	0	2	**2**
2019	ATL	15	15	99	1,394	14.1	77	92.9	54	6	2	−3	−1.5	1	0	1	0
2020	ATL	9	9	51	771	15.1	36	85.7	44	3	—	—	—	—	—	0	0
2021	TEN	10	10	31	434	14.0	19	43.4	51	1	—	—	—	—	—	0	0
2022	TB	10	5	24	299	12.5	13	29.9	48	2	5	45	9.0	15	0	0	0
2023	PHI	11	4	11	74	6.7	4	6.7	22	3	—	—	—	—	—	0	0
Career		166	153	914	13,703	15.0	646	82.5	81	66	24	163	6.8	19	0	11	6

==== Postseason ====
Year	Team	Games		Receiving						Rushing					Fumbles	
Year	Team	GP	GS	Rec	Yds	Avg	Y/G	Lng	TD	Att	Yds	Avg	Lng	TD	Fum	Lost
2011	ATL	1	1	7	64	9.1	64.0	20	0	**1**	**13**	**13.0**	**13**	0	0	0
2012	ATL	2	2	17	241	14.2	**120.5**	46	2	**1**	−1	−1.0	−1	0	0	0
2016	ATL	3	3	**19**	**334**	**17.6**	111.3	**73**	**3**	—	—	—	—	—	0	0
2017	ATL	2	2	18	195	10.8	97.5	27	1	**1**	**13**	**13.0**	**13**	0	0	0
2021	TEN	1	1	6	62	10.3	62.0	16	0	—	—	—	—	—	0	0
2022	TB	1	0	7	74	10.6	74.0	30	1	—	—	—	—	—	0	0
2023	PHI	1	1	3	22	7.3	22.0	14	0	—	—	—	—	—	**1**	0
Career		11	10	77	992	12.9	90.2	73	7	3	25	8.3	13	0	1	0

=== College ===
Season	Team	Games		Rushing					Receiving					Punt returns					Kick returns				
Season	Team	GP	GS	Att	Yds	Avg	Lng	TD	Rec	Yds	Avg	Lng	TD	Ret	Yds	Avg	Lng	TD	Ret	Yds	Avg	Lng	TD
2008	Alabama	14	14	0	0	0.0	0	0	58	924	**15.9**	64	4	2	11	5.5	10	0	1	21	21.0	21	0
2009	Alabama	13	13	2	4	2.0	5	0	43	596	13.9	**73**	4	**5**	**75**	**15.0**	33	0	1	12	12.0	12	0
2010	Alabama	13	13	**8**	**135**	**16.9**	**56**	**2**	**78**	**1,133**	14.5	68	**7**	**5**	44	8.8	**41**	0	**5**	**129**	**25.8**	**36**	0
Total		40	40	10	139	13.9	56	2	179	2,653	14.8	73	15	12	130	10.8	41	0	7	162	23.1	36	0

== Career highlights ==
=== Awards and honors ===
NFL

- 2× First-team All-Pro (2015, 2016)
- 3× Second-team All-Pro (2017–2019)
- 7× Pro Bowl (2012, 2014–2019)
- 2× NFL receiving yards leader (2015, 2018)
- NFL receptions co-leader (2015)
- NFL 2010s All-Decade Team
- Pro Football Hall of Fame All-2010s Team
- PFWA All-Rookie Team (2011)
- NFC Offensive Player of the Month (September 2015)
- 8× NFL Top 100 — 26th (2013), 13th (2015), 8th (2016), 3rd (2017), 4th (2018), 9th (2019), 11th (2020), 29th (2021)

College

- BCS national champion (2009)
- Second-team All-American (2010)
- SEC Freshman of the Year (2008)
- Sporting News All-Freshman Team (2008)
- First-team All-SEC (2010)
- 2× Second-team All-SEC (2008, 2009)
- Playboy Preseason All-American Team (2009, 2010)

=== Records ===
==== NFL records ====
Jones holds a number of individual career records:

- Most games with 250+ yards receiving (3)
- Most games with 300+ yards receiving (1, tied with Jim Benton, Cloyce Box, Stephone Paige, Flipper Anderson, and Calvin Johnson)
- Fastest to 7,000 career receiving yards (tied with Lance Alworth) (72 games)
- Fastest to 9,000 career receiving yards (95 games)
- Fastest to 10,000 career receiving yards (104 games)
- Fastest to 11,000 career receiving yards (115 games)
- Fastest to 12,000 career receiving yards (125 games)
- Fastest to 13,000 career receiving yards (137 games)
- Consecutive seasons with 1,300+ yards receiving (6) (tied with Torry Holt)
- Consecutive seasons with 1,400+ yards receiving (5)
- Consecutive seasons with 1,500+ yards receiving (2, tied with Marvin Harrison, Andre Johnson, Calvin Johnson, and Antonio Brown)
- Seasons with 1,600+ yards receiving (2, tied with Marvin Harrison, Torry Holt, Antonio Brown, Justin Jefferson, Tyreek Hill, and Calvin Johnson)
- Most seasons averaging 100+ yards per game (5)
- Only player to average 100+ yards per game (4) seasons in a row
- Most 100+ yard games in his first eight seasons (49)
- Fewest games to record 500 career receptions (80, tied with Anquan Boldin)
- Most receptions in first 90 games: 563
- Most receiving yards in first 90 games: 8,649
- Most receiving yards in first 100 games: 9,618
- Most receiving yards in first 125 games: 12,047
- Most receiving yards per game average, career: (91.9)
- Most receiving yards in a single game against the Carolina Panthers (300)
- Most receiving yards in a single game against the Green Bay Packers (259)
- Most receiving yards in a single game against the Tampa Bay Buccaneers (253)

==== Atlanta Falcons franchise records ====
- Most career receiving yards: (12,896)
- Most career receptions: (848)
- Most career games with at least 100 receiving yards, regular season: (58)
- Most career games with at least 100 receiving yards, postseason: (3)
- Most games with at least five receptions, single season: (15, in 2015)
- Most games with at least ten receptions, single season: (4, in 2015)
- Most games with a receiving touchdown, single postseason: (3) (tied with Terence Mathis)
- Most seasons at least 1,000 receiving yards (7)
- Most receiving yards in a single game, regular season: (300, in 2016)
- Most receiving yards in a single game, postseason: (182, in 2013)
- Most receptions in a single season: (136, in 2015)
- Most receiving yards in a single season: (1,871, in 2015)
- Most games with at least 100 receiving yards in a single season: (10, in 2018)
- Consecutive regular season games with at least 100 receiving yards: (6)
- Consecutive regular season games with a receiving touchdown, (9)
- Consecutive postseason games with a receiving touchdown, (3)
- Consecutive seasons with at least 100 receptions: (2) (tied with Roddy White)
- Consecutive seasons with at least 75 receptions: (6) (tied with Roddy White)
