= Justin Anderson (linebacker) =

American football player (born 1991)

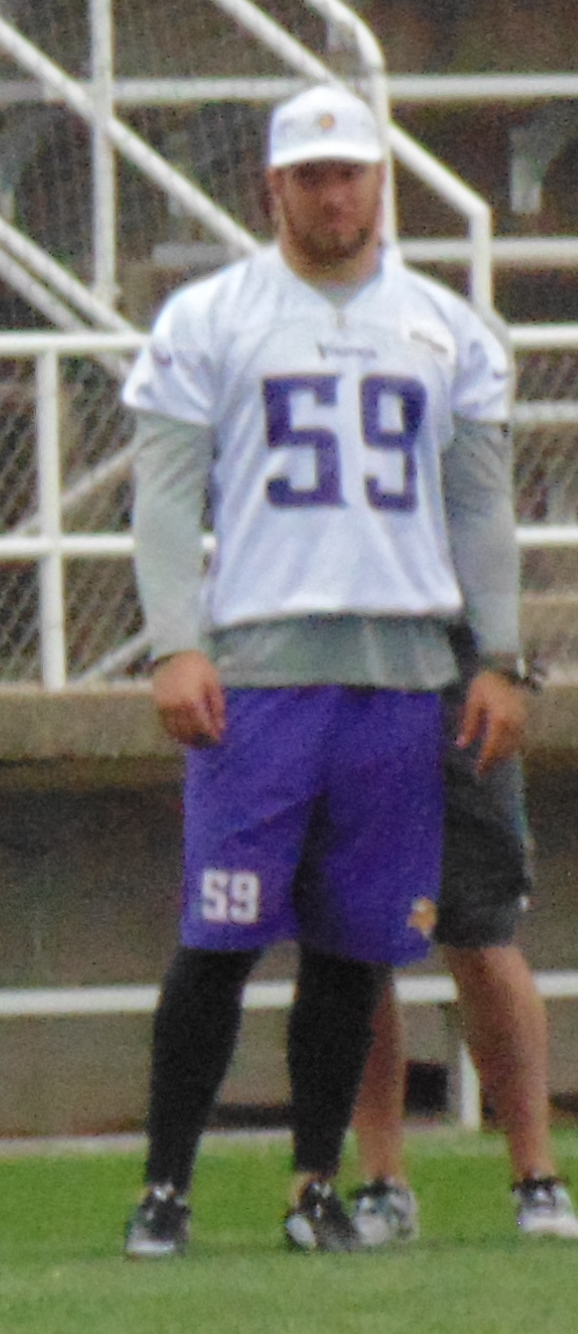

No. 47
- Position: Linebacker

Personal information
- Born: January 16, 1991 (age 35); Foley, Alabama, U.S.
- Listed height: 6 ft 2 in (1.88 m)
- Listed weight: 232 lb (105 kg)

Career information
- High school: Foley (AL)
- College: Louisiana–Lafayette
- NFL draft: 2014: undrafted

Career history
- New York Giants (2014); Minnesota Vikings (2014)*; Dallas Cowboys (2015)*; New Orleans Saints (2015)*
- * Offseason or practice squad member only
- Stats at Pro Football Reference

Justin Anderson (born January 16, 1991) is an American former football linebacker. He was signed by the New York Giants as an undrafted free agent in 2014. He played college football at Louisiana–Lafayette.

== Professional career ==
=== New York Giants ===
On May 10, 2014, he was signed to the New York Giants as an undrafted free agent. After an injury, he was cut by the Giants and did not make the 53-man roster. After an injury to starting middle-linebacker Jon Beason, Anderson was promoted to the active roster. He was waived on November 25.

=== Minnesota Vikings ===
Anderson was signed to the practice squad of the Minnesota Vikings on December 24, 2014. He was released on March 26, 2015.

=== Dallas Cowboys ===
On July 28, 2015, he was signed as a free agent by the Dallas Cowboys. He was waived injured on August 8.

=== New Orleans Saints ===
On August 17, 2015, Anderson was signed by the New Orleans Saints. On September 5, 2015, he was released by the Saints.
