= D. J. Fluker =

American football player (born 1991)

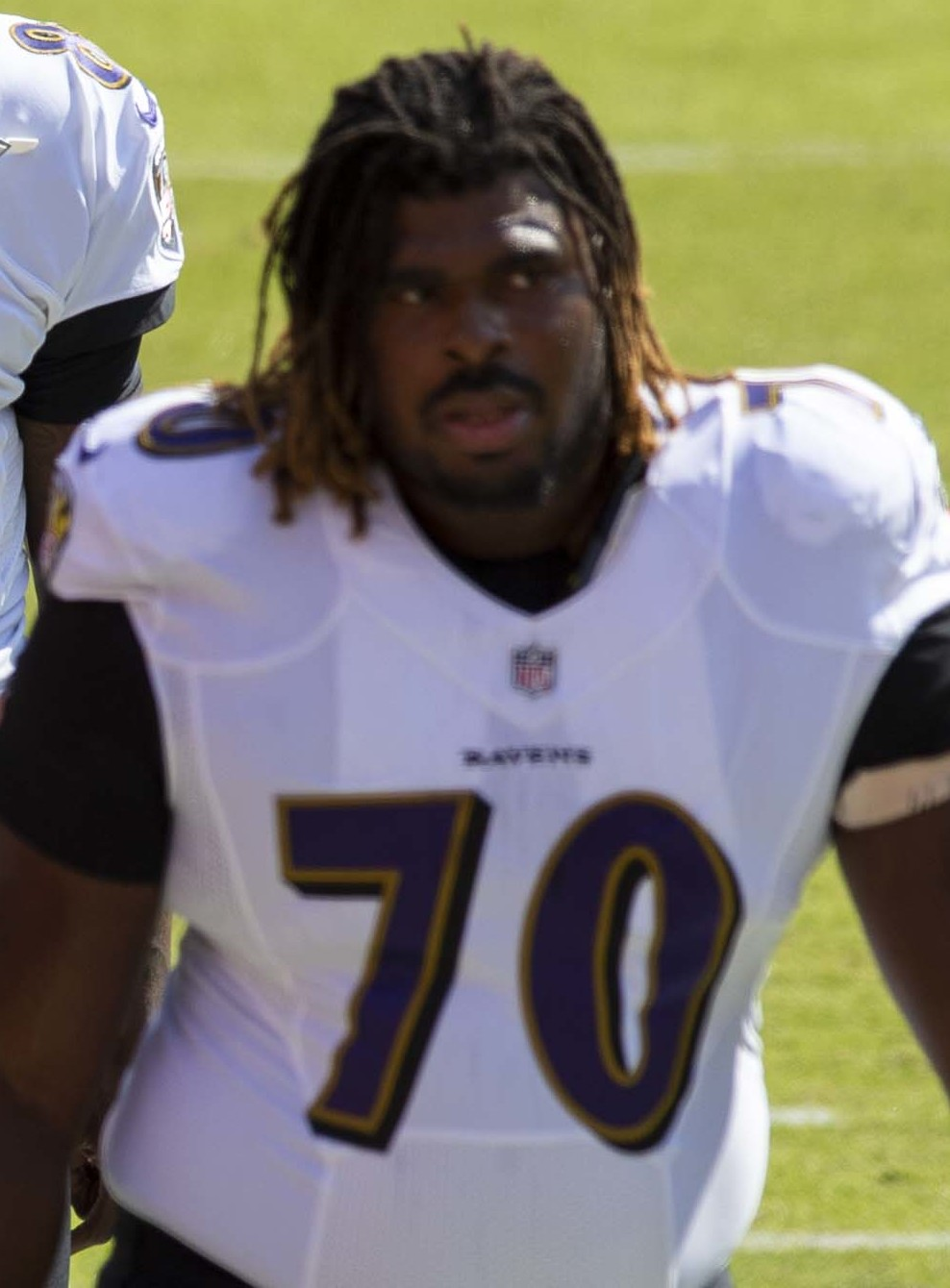
- Fluker with the Baltimore Ravens in 2020

Profile
- Position: Offensive tackle

Personal information
- Born: March 13, 1991 (age 35); New Orleans, Louisiana, U.S.
- Listed height: 6 ft 5 in (1.96 m)
- Listed weight: 339 lb (154 kg)

Career information
- High school: Foley (Foley, Alabama)
- College: Alabama (2009–2012)
- NFL draft: 2013: 1st round, 11th overall pick

Career history
- San Diego Chargers (2013–2016); New York Giants (2017); Seattle Seahawks (2018–2019); Baltimore Ravens (2020); Miami Dolphins (2021)*; Las Vegas Raiders (2021)*; Jacksonville Jaguars (2021)*; Las Vegas Raiders (2023)*; DC Defenders (2025)*
- * Offseason or practice squad member only

Awards and highlights
- PFWA All-Rookie Team (2013); 3× BCS national champion (2010, 2012, 2013); First-team All-American (2012); First-team All-SEC (2012)

Career NFL statistics
- Games played: 108
- Games started: 96
- Stats at Pro Football Reference

Danny Lee Jesus "D. J." Fluker (born March 13, 1991) is an American professional football offensive tackle. He was selected by the San Diego Chargers in the first round of the 2013 NFL draft. He played college football for the Alabama Crimson Tide, where he was recognized as an All-American.

== Early life ==
Born and raised in the Lower Ninth Ward of New Orleans, Louisiana, Fluker and his family left the city in the final hours before Hurricane Katrina roared ashore. They moved to Biloxi, Mississippi, and later Mobile, Alabama, where Fluker attended McGill-Toolen Catholic High School. By eighth grade, he stood 6'3" and weighed 400 pounds, but later lost much of that weight. At McGill-Toolen, Fluker was a dominating defensive lineman. Family issues took him back to Biloxi for his junior year, where he remained at defensive tackle, after almost giving up on his football career.

Prior to his senior year, Fluker moved back to Alabama, this time to the city of Foley. At Foley High School, head coach Todd Watson convinced him to play on the offensive line to exploit his full potential. Foley finished the season with a 7–3 record, including a 24–17 win over Fluker's old McGill-Toolen team. Fluker earned high school All-American honors from USA Today, Parade, EA Sports, and SuperPrep. He also received an invitation to the 2009 U.S. Army All-American Bowl.

In addition to football, Fluker was a member of the Foley track & field team, where he threw the shot put, recording a top-throw of 16.27 meters (53 ft 1 in) at the 2009 Mobile Challenge, where he took 4th.

Considered a five-star recruit by Rivals.com, Fluker was ranked No. 1 among offensive tackle prospects in the nation. Despite growing up an LSU Tigers fan, he committed to Alabama.

== College career ==
The kid's a freak athlete. He probably outweighs me by 70 pounds and moves just as well.

— Mike Johnson, Fluker's Alabama teammate

Fluker enrolled in the University of Alabama, where he was a member of coach Nick Saban's Alabama Crimson Tide football team from 2009 to 2012. Projected to play as true freshman at Alabama, he was a candidate to replace All-American Andre Smith at left tackle, although junior college transfer James Carpenter was considered to have better chances, and eventually got the starting nod. Fluker started the season as third-string right tackle, but eventually redshirted his first year. In 2010, he started nine games at right tackle. He missed three games with an injury midseason.

As a sophomore, Fluker started all 13 games for the Crimson Tide at right tackle on their way to the BCS National Championship victory over the LSU Tigers. As a junior, he started all 14 games at right tackle as Alabama repeated as BCS National Champions, this time against Notre Dame. He was selected Walter Camp and Associated Press second-team All-American and first-team All-SEC. He has graded out at 98.6 percent on blocking assignments. Since he had graduated and was in his fourth year, Fluker was granted eligibity by the National Football League to participate in the 2013 Senior Bowl.

== Professional career ==
Pre-draft measurables
Height	Weight	Arm length	Hand span	Wingspan	40-yard dash	10-yard split	20-yard split	20-yard shuttle	Vertical jump	Bench press
6 ft 4 5/8 in (1.95 m)	339 lb (154 kg)	36 3/4 in (0.93 m)	10 1/2 in (0.27 m)	7 ft 3 1/4 in (2.22 m)	5.31 s	1.90 s	3.12 s	5.00 s	27.5 in (0.70 m)	21 reps
All values from NFL Combine/Pro Day

=== San Diego Chargers ===
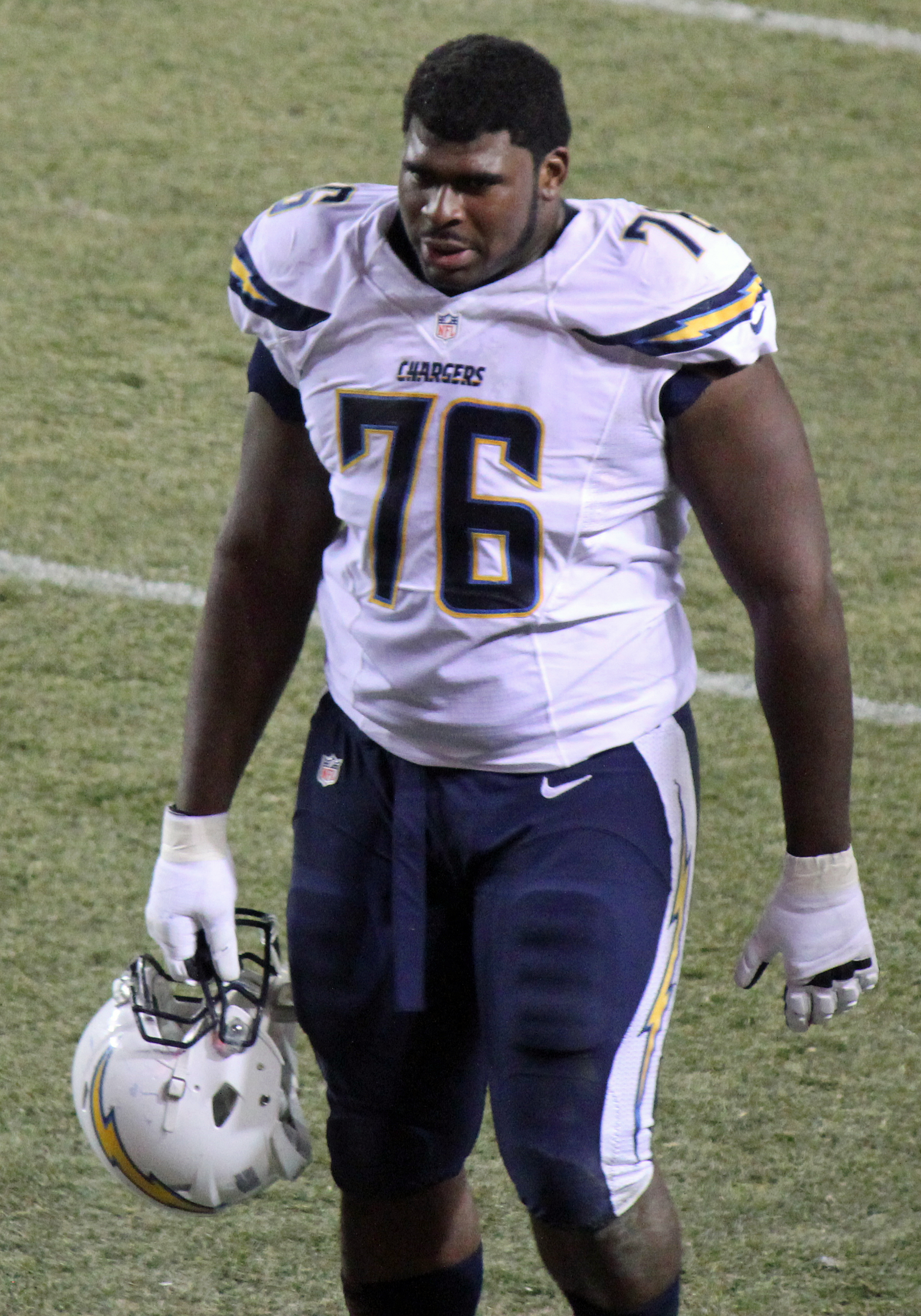
Fluker with the San Diego Chargers in 2013

The San Diego Chargers selected Fluker in the first round (11th overall) of the 2013 NFL draft. He was the third of nine Crimson Tide players to be selected that year. He was the fourth Alabama offensive lineman selected in the first round within five years, after Andre Smith (2009), James Carpenter (2011), and Chance Warmack (2013).

During his rookie year, Fluker started in 15 games and was named to the PFWA All-Rookie Team. In the 2014 season, he started all sixteen games for the first time in his professional career. For the 2015 season, he moved from right tackle to right guard. In the 2015 season, he started in 12 games and recovered one fumble. He missed some time on the season due to an ankle injury. In the 2016 season, he started in all 16 games.

On March 7, 2017, he was released by the Chargers, who had relocated to Los Angeles.

=== New York Giants ===
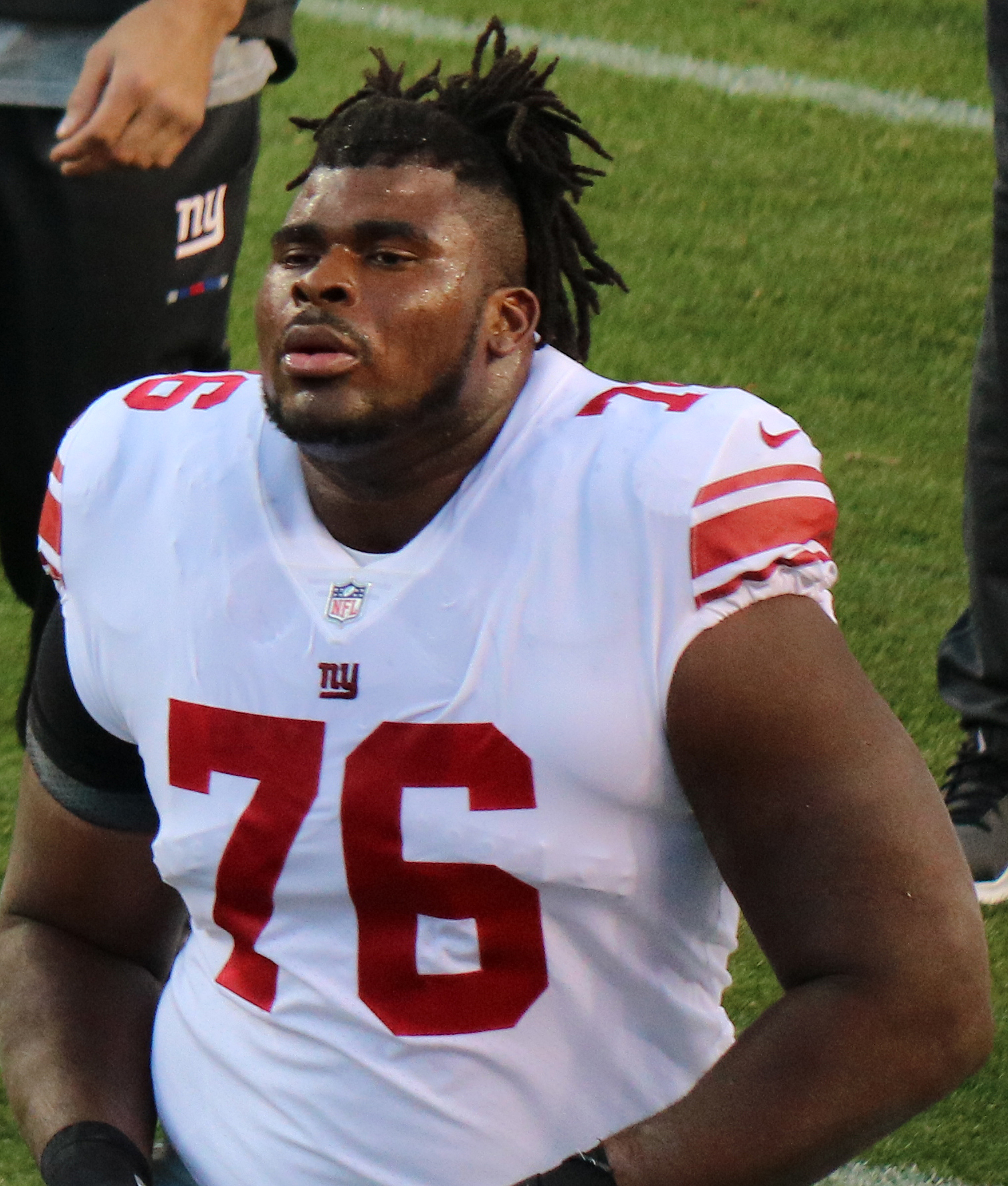
Fluker with the New York Giants in 2017

On March 11, 2017, Fluker signed a one-year, $3 million contract with the New York Giants. He played in nine games, starting six at right guard before hurting his toe in Week 11 against the Kansas City Chiefs. He was placed on injured reserve on November 27, 2017.

=== Seattle Seahawks ===
On March 20, 2018, he was signed by the Seattle Seahawks. He played in 10 games, starting nine at right guard.

On March 14, 2019, Fluker signed a two-year, $9 million contract extension with the Seahawks. He appeared in and started 14 regular season games and both of the Seahawks' playoff games in the 2019 season. He was released by the Seahawks on April 27, 2020.

=== Baltimore Ravens ===
On May 11, 2020, Fluker was signed by the Baltimore Ravens. He was placed on the reserve/COVID-19 list by the team on November 28, 2020, and activated two days later. He appeared in all 16 regular season games and started eight. He appeared in the Ravens' two playoff games.

=== Miami Dolphins ===
Fluker signed with the Miami Dolphins on April 20, 2021. He was placed on injured reserve on July 29, 2021, after undergoing surgery for a torn meniscus. He was released on August 2, 2021.

He was suspended six weeks by the NFL on September 15, 2021, and reinstated on October 19.

=== Las Vegas Raiders (first stint) ===
On October 20, 2021, Fluker was signed to the practice squad of the Las Vegas Raiders. He was released on December 2, 2021.

=== Jacksonville Jaguars ===
On December 31, 2021, Fluker was signed to the Jacksonville Jaguars practice squad, but was released three days later.

=== Las Vegas Raiders (second stint) ===
On December 11, 2023, Fluker was signed to the Raiders practice squad. He signed a reserve/future contract on January 8, 2024, but was released on April 5.

=== DC Defenders ===
On March 6, 2025, Fluker signed with the DC Defenders of the United Football League (UFL). He was released by the Defenders on March 20.
