= Brandon Barden =

American football player (born 1989)

No. 81
- Position: Tight end

Personal information
- Born: March 15, 1989 (age 37); Lincolnton, Georgia, U.S.
- Listed height: 6 ft 5 in (1.96 m)
- Listed weight: 246 lb (112 kg)

Career information
- High school: Lincolnton (GA) Lincoln Co.
- College: Vanderbilt
- NFL draft: 2012: undrafted

Career history
- Tennessee Titans (2012–2013); Jacksonville Jaguars (2013–2014)*; Kansas City Chiefs (2014–2015)*; Dallas Cowboys (2015)*
- * Offseason or practice squad member only

Awards and highlights
- Second-team All-SEC (2010)
- Stats at Pro Football Reference

Brandon Michael Barden (born March 15, 1989) is an American former football tight end. He was originally signed by the Tennessee Titans as an undrafted free agent in 2012. He played college football at Vanderbilt University.

== Professional career ==
=== Tennessee Titans ===
After going undrafted, Barden was signed as an undrafted free agent by the Tennessee Titans.

=== Jacksonville Jaguars ===
Barden was signed to the Jacksonville Jaguars practice squad on November 19, 2013. He was signed to the active roster at the conclusion of the 2013 regular season. The Jaguars released Barden on August 29, 2014.

=== Kansas City Chiefs ===
Barden was signed to the Kansas City Chiefs practice squad on October 14, 2014. On December 31, he signed a future deal with the Chiefs.

=== Dallas Cowboys ===
On August 4, 2015, the Dallas Cowboys signed Barden. On September 1, 2015, he was released by the Cowboys.
