= John Burton Foley =

American businessman

John Burton Foley Sr.
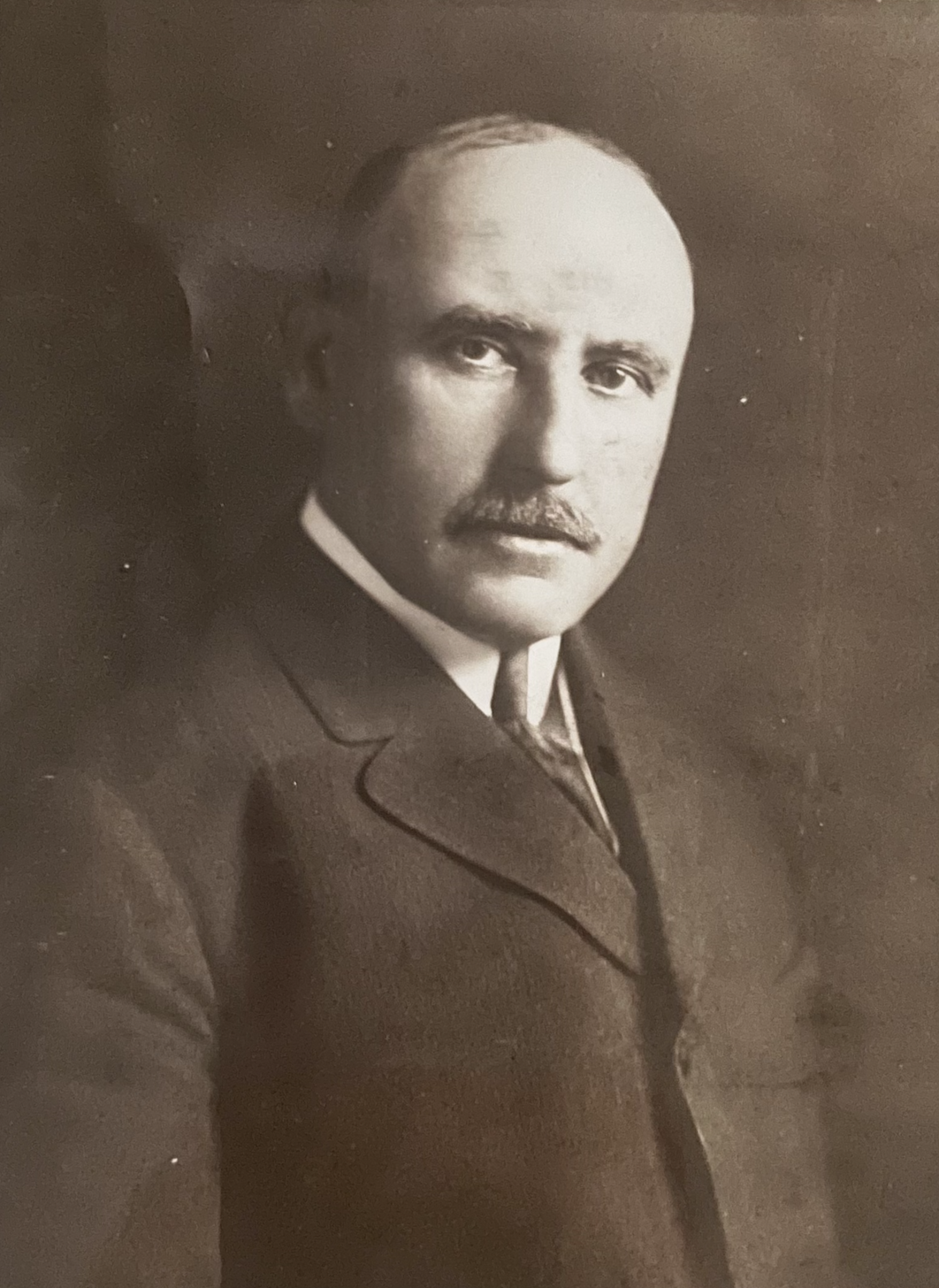
- Born: December 19, 1857; Chicago, IL
- Died: February 4, 1925 (aged 67); Chicago, IL
- Resting place: Rosehill Cemetery
- Era: The Gilded Age
- Spouse: Anna Foley (née McCloskey)
- Children: 5

John Burton Foley Sr. (December 19, 1857 — February 4, 1925) was an American businessman, druggist, and financier best known for founding the town of Foley, Alabama in 1902. He also established Foley and Co., a patent drug manufacturing company best known for Foley's Honey and Tar Compound and their yearly almanacs.

== Early life ==
Foley was born on December 19, 1857, in Chicago, Illinois. He was the second-born of eight children. At eighteen months old, Foley's parents moved the family to Steubenville, Ohio, where he would spend the remainder of his childhood. In high school, Foley worked as a drug clerk at a pharmacy, where he was first exposed to the drug manufacturing industry.

== Foley and Co. ==
After three years as a bookkeeper, Foley bought a drug company in Steubenville and began selling his own patent drug products under Foley and Co. One of his most well known products was Foley's Honey and Tar Compound, a syrup which claimed to soothe chest and throat discomfort.

In 1888, Foley moved to Chicago to expand Foley and Co.'s operations. There, he rented two floors downtown and hired over a dozen employees to manufacture and distribute his products. In 1912, the company built a more spacious three-story headquarters in Lakeview (upgraded to five stories in 1919) and set up an in-house print shop dedicated to producing yearly Foley and Co. almanacs, packaging, and other marketing materials.

== Founding of Foley, Alabama ==
While traveling to President William McKinley's funeral in 1902, Foley was informed by a rail worker of promising former timberland in South Baldwin County. After visiting the area, he bought approximately 50,000 acres of land and founded Magnolia Springs Land Company (now Magnolia Land Company) to manage the acreage.

In 1905, a portion of this acreage was named after its founder. That same year, Foley convinced the Louisville and Nashville Railroad to extend a railroad spur to the town, an undertaking made possible with Foley's financial assistance. He also helped design the town's layout around the new rail service, and invested in its first bank, utility company, and hotel.

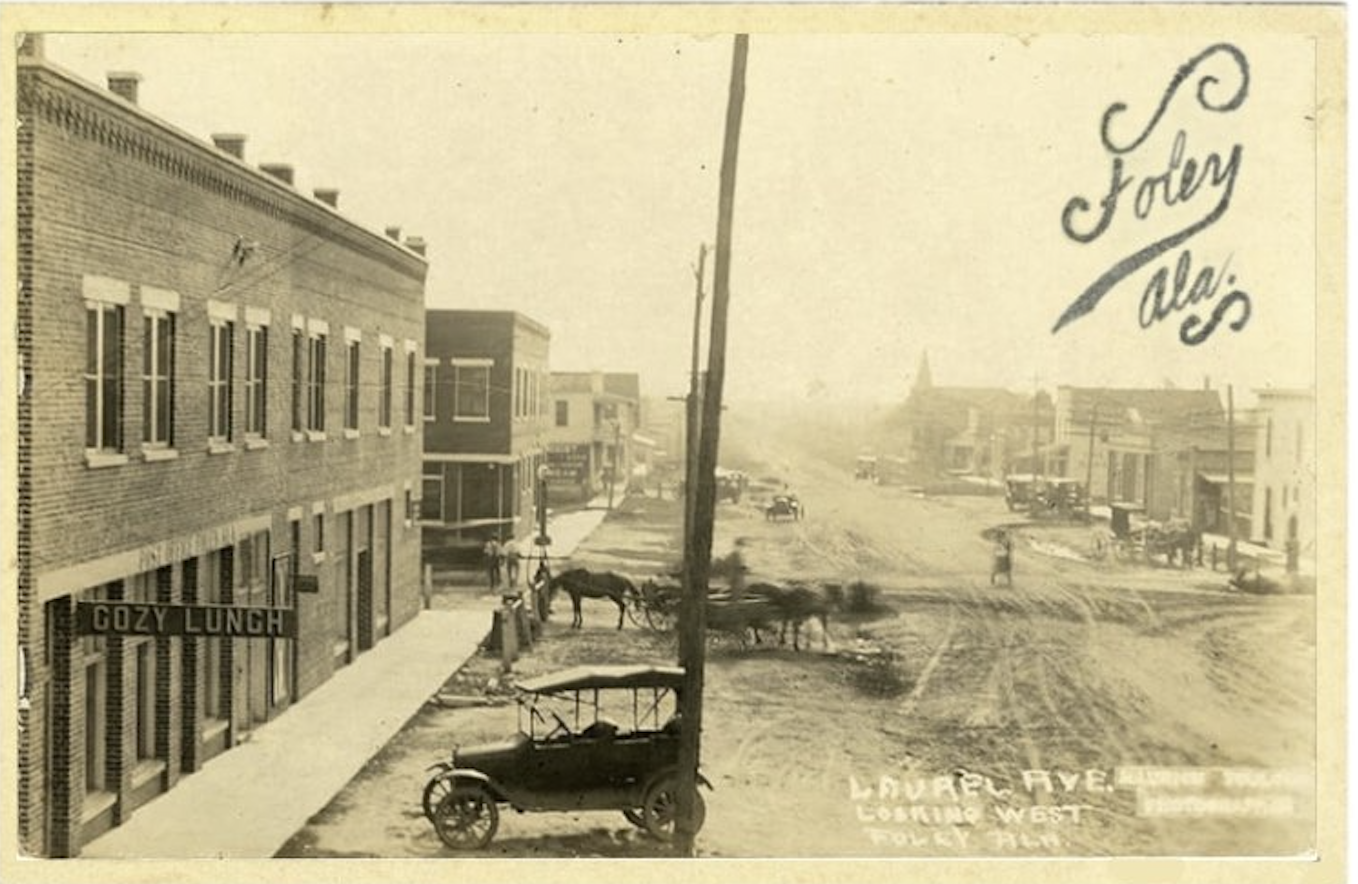
Postcard from Foley (1910)

While a Presbyterian himself, Foley bestowed plots of land to various denominations to help establish churches in the area. Many of these churches are still active today, including Saint Margaret of Scotland, St. Paul's Episcopal Church, and First Baptist Church of Foley.

On January 8, 1915, the town of Foley, Alabama was officially incorporated by Baldwin County, with Foley paying for many of the town's early services. He had first visited the area in 1902.

== Personal life ==
John Burton Foley Sr. married Anna Shaw McCloskey on January 1, 1889. They had five children: Florence, Virginia, Garrett Radcliffe, Loyal Ludington, and John Burton Jr. In Chicago, Foley was a member of the Union League.

== Death ==
Foley died on February 5, 1925, while attending a performance of "The Rivals" at Chicago's Illinois Theatre. He was 67 years old.

After his death, his oldest son Garrett ran Magnolia Springs Land Company, while the younger Loyal managed Foley and Co. Eventually, Foley and Co.'s headquarters were moved to Foley, Alabama, where the company remained active until 1963, when it was sold to Myers Laboratories, Inc. Magnolia Springs Land Company (now Magnolia Land Company), remains active to this day.
