= Foley, Alabama =

City in Alabama, United States

- City
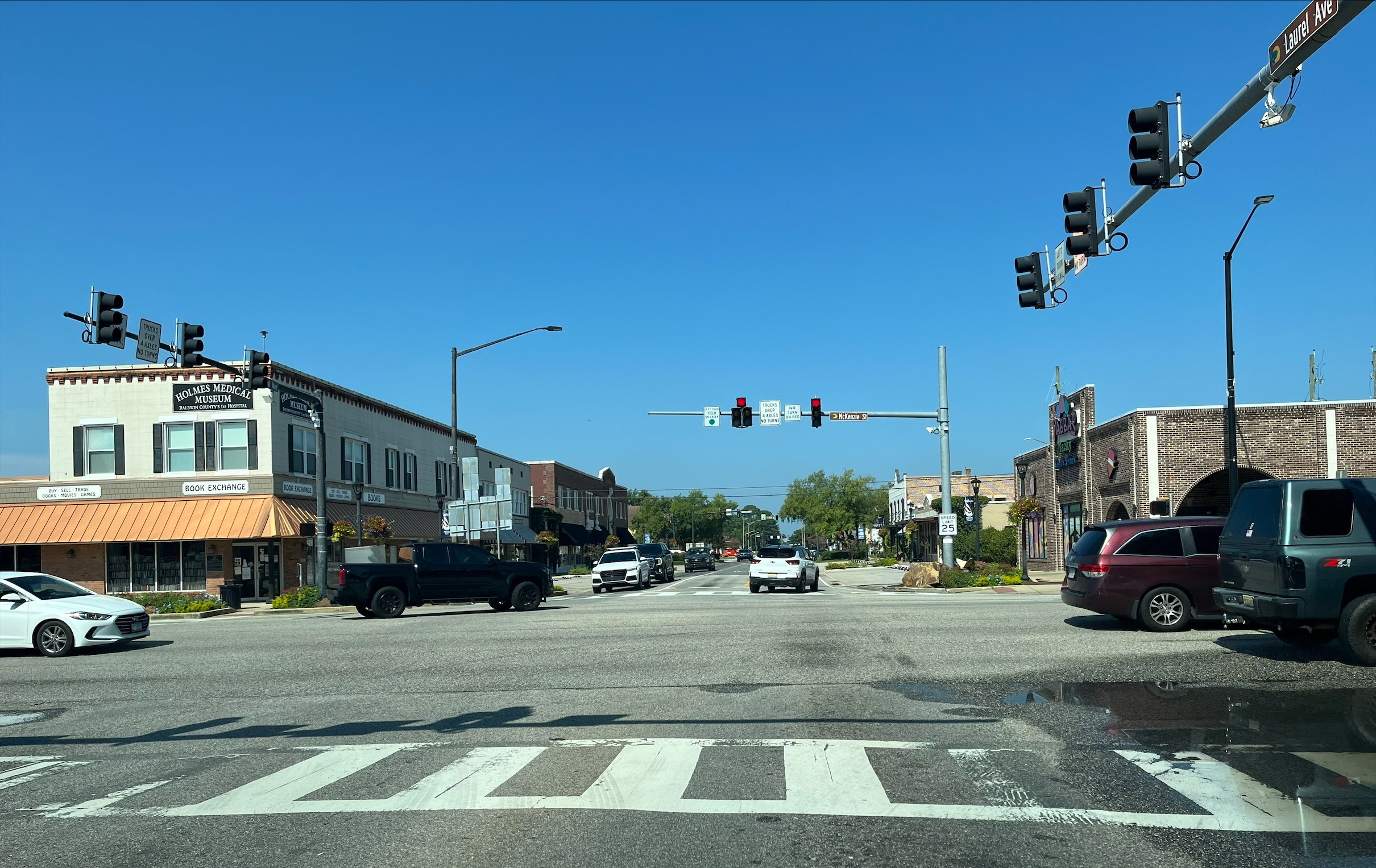
- Intersection of U.S. Route 98 and Alabama State Highway 59 in Foley

- Flag Seal Logo
- Nickname: "The Forward City"
- Motto: "The Heart of the American Riviera"
- Location of Foley in Baldwin County, Alabama.
- Coordinates: 30°23′50″N 87°38′43″W
- Country: United States
- State: Alabama
- County: Baldwin

Government
  - Type: Council/Mayor

Area
  - Total: 32.65 sq mi (84.57 km^{2})
  - Land: 32.51 sq mi (84.20 km^{2})
  - Water: 0.14 sq mi (0.37 km^{2})
- Elevation: 62 ft (19 m)

Population (2020)
  - Total: 20,335
  - Density: 625.5/sq mi (241.51/km^{2})
- Time zone: UTC−6 (Central (CST))
  - Summer (DST): UTC−5 (CDT)
- ZIP code: 36535-36536
- Area code: 251
- FIPS code: 01-26992
- GNIS feature ID: 2403626
- Website: www.cityoffoley.org

Foley is a city in Baldwin County, Alabama, United States. The 2020 census lists the population of the city as 20,335 Foley is a principal city of the Daphne-Fairhope-Foley metropolitan area, which includes all of Baldwin County.

== History ==
Foley was named for its founder, John B. Foley of Chicago. As Foley was traveling to President William McKinley's funeral in 1901, he met a railroad agent who told him of the area in South Baldwin County. Foley came down the following year, and liked what he saw, buying between 40,000 acres (160 km^{2}) and 50,000 acres (200 km^{2}) of land. He then returned to Chicago and formed the Magnolia Springs Land Company, currently known as the Magnolia Land Company. As he began to sell off acreage, he realized the need for a better way for the people to come to Foley.

Foley used some of his own money to lay the rails so the train could come from Bay Minette. The first railroad station was built in 1905. The original station burned in 1908 and was replaced the following year by the station that is now the city's museum. John Foley donated parcels of land for a school, railroad station, park and churches. These included the current Catholic Church, Saint Margaret of Scotland, the Baptist church and the Methodist church. He also invested in a hotel, a demonstration farm, a bank and the utility company.

The first train to service Foley was a wood burner called the "Pine Knot Special." It would leave Foley in the morning and make a return trip in the afternoon. As people cleared the land, they would place lighter knots in a wood box for the engineer to use as was needed. Foley was incorporated in 1915 with G. I. Weatherly serving as its first mayor.

The city of Foley is now known for its annual toy drive that takes place every year on June 25 to help the local children who are in need. Thousands of donations are made and it helps the children whose families are struggling financially.

== Geography ==
According to the U.S. Census Bureau, the city has a total area of 25.89 sq mi (67.1 km^{2}), of which 25.76 sq mi (66.7 km^{2}) is land and 0.4% is water.

== Demographics ==
Historical population
| Census | Pop. | Note | %± |
|---|---|---|---|
| 1920 | 243 | | — |
| 1930 | 791 | | 225.5% |
| 1940 | 864 | | 9.2% |
| 1950 | 1,301 | | 50.6% |
| 1960 | 2,889 | | 122.1% |
| 1970 | 3,368 | | 16.6% |
| 1980 | 4,003 | | 18.9% |
| 1990 | 4,937 | | 23.3% |
| 2000 | 7,590 | | 53.7% |
| 2010 | 14,618 | | 92.6% |
| 2020 | 20,335 | | 39.1% |
| 2025 (est.) | 30,354 | ▲ | 49.3% |
U.S. Decennial Census

=== Racial and ethnic composition ===
Foley city, Alabama – Racial and ethnic composition Note: the US Census treats Hispanic/Latino as an ethnic category. This table excludes Latinos from the racial categories and assigns them to a separate category. Hispanics/Latinos may be of any race.
| Race / Ethnicity (NH = Non-Hispanic) | Pop 1980 | Pop 1990 | Pop 2000 | Pop 2010 | Pop 2020 | % 1980 | % 1990 | % 2000 | % 2010 | % 2020 |
|---|---|---|---|---|---|---|---|---|---|---|
| White alone (NH) | 3,091 | 3,893 | 5,422 | 10,626 | 14,858 | 77.22% | 78.85% | 71.44% | 72.69% | 73.07% |
| Black or African American alone (NH) | 912 | 917 | 1,655 | 2,148 | 2,339 | 22.78% | 18.57% | 21.81% | 14.69% | 11.50% |
| Native American or Alaska Native alone (NH) | 0 | 15 | 44 | 70 | 95 | 0.00% | 0.30% | 0.58% | 0.48% | 0.47% |
| Asian alone (NH) | 0 | 16 | 42 | 155 | 220 | 0.00% | 0.32% | 0.55% | 1.06% | 1.08% |
| Native Hawaiian or Pacific Islander alone (NH) | x | x | 3 | 7 | 8 | x | x | 0.04% | 0.05% | 0.04% |
| Other race alone (NH) | 0 | 5 | 9 | 26 | 109 | 0.00% | 0.10% | 0.12% | 0.18% | 0.54% |
| Mixed race or Multiracial (NH) | x | x | 63 | 196 | 938 | x | x | 0.83% | 1.34% | 4.61% |
| Hispanic or Latino (any race) | 0 | 91 | 352 | 1,390 | 1,768 | 0.00% | 1.84% | 4.64% | 9.51% | 8.69% |
| Total | 4,003 | 4,937 | 7,590 | 14,618 | 20,335 | 100.00% | 100.00% | 100.00% | 100.00% | 100.00% |

=== 2020 census ===
As of the 2020 census, there were 20,335 people, 8,799 households, and 4,298 families residing in the city.

The median age was 48.5 years. 18.3% of residents were under the age of 18 and 28.6% of residents were 65 years of age or older. For every 100 females there were 85.2 males, and for every 100 females age 18 and over there were 82.6 males age 18 and over.

90.4% of residents lived in urban areas, while 9.6% lived in rural areas.

There were 8,799 households, of which 22.7% had children under the age of 18 living in them. Of all households, 46.8% were married-couple households, 14.7% were households with a male householder and no spouse or partner present, and 31.6% were households with a female householder and no spouse or partner present. About 28.8% of all households were made up of individuals and 15.4% had someone living alone who was 65 years of age or older.

There were 9,911 housing units, of which 11.2% were vacant. The homeowner vacancy rate was 2.4% and the rental vacancy rate was 10.3%.

=== 2010 census ===
As of the census of 2010, there were 14,618 people, 6,165 households, and 4,124 families residing in the city. The population density was 530.8 inhabitants per square mile (204.9/km^{2}). There were 7,359 housing units at an average density of 284.1 per square mile (109.7/km^{2}). The racial makeup of the city was 77.1% White, 14.9% Black or African American, 0.6% Native American, 1.1% Asian, 0.1% Pacific Islander, 4.7% from other races, and 1.6% from two or more races. 9.5% of the population were Hispanic or Latino of any race.

There were 6,165 households, out of which 23.7% had children under the age of 18 living with them, 48.5% were married couples living together, 14.2% had a female householder with no husband present, and 33.1% were non-families. 27.4% of all households were made up of individuals, and 12.2% had someone living alone who was 65 years of age or older. The average household size was 2.35 and the average family size was 2.82.

In the city, the age distribution of the population shows 20.9% under the age of 18, 8.7% from 18 to 24, 22.9% from 25 to 44, 20.9% from 45 to 64, and 22.0% who were 65 years of age or older. The median age was 42.5 years. For every 100 females, there were 88.3 males. For every 100 females age 18 and over, there were 87.8 males.

The median income for a household in the city was $41,221, and the median income for a family was $50,854. Males had a median income of $36,959 versus $26,855 for females. The per capita income for the city was $22,967. About 15.4% of families and 19.2% of the population were below the poverty line, including 35.9% of those under age 18 and 5.7% of those age 65 or over.

== Education ==
Foley is a part of the Baldwin County Public Schools system. Two elementary schools, a middle school, and a high school serve the city of Foley.

=== Schools ===
==== High school ====
- Foley High School (9-12)

==== Middle school ====
- Foley Middle School (7-8)

==== Primary schools ====
- Foley Elementary School (K-6)
- Florence B. Mathis Elementary (K-6)
- Magnolia Elementary Schools (K-6)
- Swift Consolidated Elementary (K-6)

== Foley Public Library ==
The Foley Public Library has in excess of 50,000 volumes, internet computers, children's reading programs and public meeting rooms for civic organizations.

== Points of interest ==
The City of Foley Antique Rose Trail features over 500 varieties of fragrant roses.

OWA is a 520-acre resort destination located in Foley near the commercial corridor of South McKenzie Street. Owned and operated by the Poarch Band of Creek Indians, OWA's name is inspired from the Muscogee Creek term meaning “big water.” It opened in 2017, being centered around an artificial lake with an island (Dubbed Gravity Island), similarly to another Entertainment District, Broadway at the Beach in Myrtle Beach, South Carolina. The resort features an entertainment, shopping, and dining section called Downtown OWA, an amusement park section called The Park at OWA, with rides being supplied by Italian manufacturer Zamperla, including a rollercoaster called Rollin' Thunder, a copy of Thunderbolt at Zamperla's Luna Park, and a TownePlace Suites hotel. A water park known as Tropic Falls was announced in 2021; the first of the water park's two phases opened in June 2022. OWA also held the Gulf Coast Hot Air Balloon Festival for 2021.

== Transportation ==
Countywide dial-a-ride transit service is provided by BRATS, the Baldwin Regional Area Transit System.

== Notable people ==
- Justin Anderson, professional football linebacker
- Walter Ballard, racing driver
- Fannie Flagg, actress, comedienne, and author of Fried Green Tomatoes and other novels
- D. J. Fluker, professional football offensive lineman
- Apollo Smile, born as Paula Ann Schafer, a dancer and tv personality
- Julio Jones, former wide receiver for several teams
- Everett Kelly, member of the Florida House of Representatives from 1978 to 1982
- Robert Lester, professional football defensive back
- Bubba Marriott, football player
- Ken Stabler, former quarterback for several teams
- Chris Watton, former professional football offensive lineman

== Activities ==
The City of Foley Museum & Archives and Model Train Exhibit is located in a restored train depot from the early 1900s. It holds archives for the City of Foley as well as railroad memorabilia.

Holmes Medical Museum is located in downtown Foley and was the first hospital in Baldwin County. It has a doctor's sled on display as well as a large collection of 20th century medical equipment.

== Twin Towns – Sister Cities ==
- Hennef, Germany (2022)
