= Robert Lester (American football) =

American football player (born 1988)

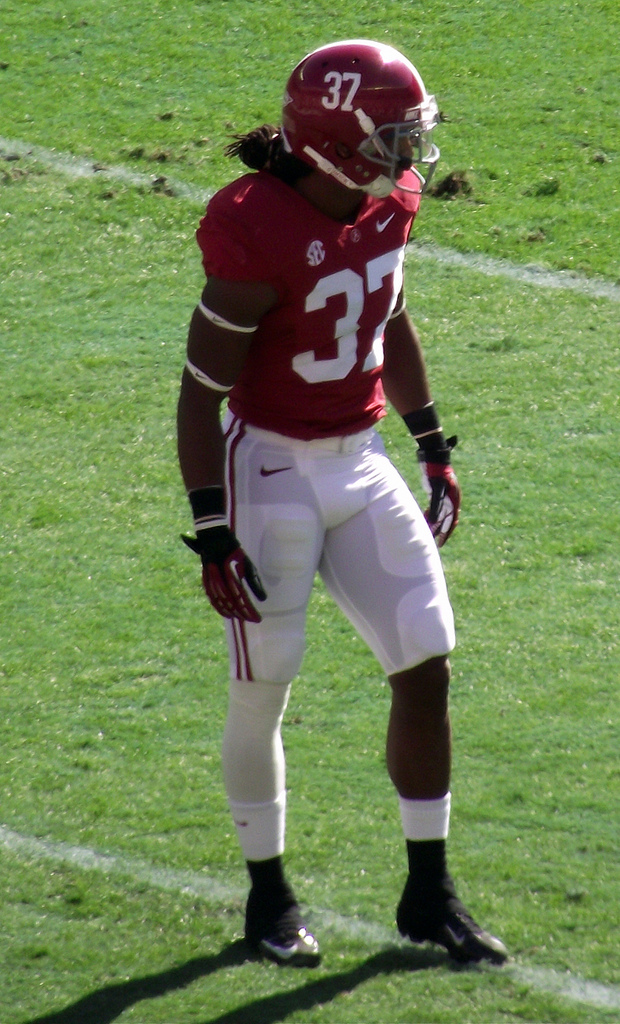
- Lester with Alabama in 2012

No. 38
- Position: Safety

Personal information
- Born: April 30, 1988 (age 38); Foley, Alabama, U.S.
- Listed height: 6 ft 1 in (1.85 m)
- Listed weight: 225 lb (102 kg)

Career information
- High school: Foley
- College: Alabama
- NFL draft: 2013: undrafted

Career history
- Carolina Panthers (2013–2014)

Awards and highlights
- BCS national champion (2010, 2012, 2013); Second-team All-American (2010); Second-team All-SEC (2010, 2012); SBNation.com All-Rookie Team

Career NFL statistics
- Total tackles: 22
- Fumble recoveries: 1
- Pass deflections: 4
- Interceptions: 3
- Stats at Pro Football Reference

Robert Lester (born April 30, 1988) is an American former professional football player who was a safety for the Carolina Panthers of the National Football League (NFL). He played his college football for the Alabama Crimson Tide, and signed as an undrafted free agent with the Panthers in 2013.

== College career ==
As a freshman in 2009, Lester played in eight games, recording eight tackles. He played on special teams in the national championship game against Texas, but did not record a tackle. As a sophomore in 2010, Lester took over as a starter and had 52 tackles, eight interceptions, and a sack.

As a junior in 2011, Lester started all 13 games at strong safety during the Crimson Tide's 2011 national championship season. He had 39 tackles, three pass breakups, a forced fumble, one tackle for loss, and a blocked field goal. He intercepted his first pass against Ole Miss and his second against LSU during the regular season. His eight interceptions in his Sophomore year tied Harry Gilmer (1946) for the second most in a single season in Alabama school history.

=== College statistics ===
Year	GP–GS	Tackles				Sacks	Pass defense				Fumbles		Blocked
Year	GP–GS	Solo	Ast	Total	Loss–Yards	No–Yards	Int–Yards	BU	PD	QBH	Rcv–Yards	FF	Kick
2009	8–0	6	2	8	0.0–0	0.0–0	0–0	0	0	0	0–0	0	0
2010	13–13	29	23	52	1.5–10	1.0–9	8–102	4	12	2	1–89	0	0
2011	13–13	22	17	39	1.5–2	0.0–0	2–30	3	5	0	0–0	1	1
2012	13–13	21	21	42	3.5–11	1.5–7	4–51	3	7	0	1–0	0	0

== Professional career ==
Pre-draft measurables
Height	Weight	Arm length	Hand span	40-yard dash	10-yard split	20-yard split	20-yard shuttle	Three-cone drill	Vertical jump	Broad jump	Bench press
6 ft 1 1/4 in (1.86 m)	220 lb (100 kg)	32 in (0.81 m)	9 3/4 in (0.25 m)	4.62 s	1.61 s	2.69 s	4.31 s	7.29 s	34.5 in (0.88 m)	10 ft 1 in (3.07 m)	7 reps

After going undrafted in the 2013 NFL draft, Lester was signed as a free agent by the Carolina Panthers. He was released on August 31, 2013, during final cuts, but was then signed to the Panthers practice squad the next day. On September 17, 2013, Lester was elevated from the practice squad to the active roster after Charles Godfrey was lost for the season due to injury. He started at Strong Safety week 3 vs the New York Giants in his first NFL game, and Lester finished with 5 tackles, a pass deflection, a fumble recovery, and an interception. In his rookie season, Lester played in 12 games and started four games. He recorded 21 tackles, three interceptions, four passes defensed and one fumble recovery. Opposing quarterbacks had a 49.6 rating when throwing in Lester's direction in 2013.

He was released on August 30, 2014, for final roster cuts before the start of the 2014 season. He was signed to the team's practice squad the next day. He was promoted to the active roster on October 14.

On September 1, 2015, Lester was released by the Panthers.
