= City of Foley Antique Rose Trail =

Rail trail in Foley, Alabama

Wilbourne Antique Rose Trail
- Length: 1 mile (1.6 km)
- Location: Foley, Alabama
- Established: March 31, 2007; 19 years ago
- Designation: National Recreation Trail
- Use: Cycling, hiking
- Highest point: 79 feet (24 m)
- Lowest point: 77 feet (23 m)
- Grade: 1%
- Maintained by: City of Foley
- Website: visitfoley.com/listing/wilbourne-antique-rose-trail

The City of Foley Antique Rose Trail, also known as the Wilbourne Antique Rose Trail, or just the Antique Rose Trail is a one-mile long asphalt-covered rail trail in Foley, Alabama. Opened in 2007, it passes through downtown Foley and features many different types of roses along the trail. It was designated as a National Recreation Trail in 2011.

== History ==
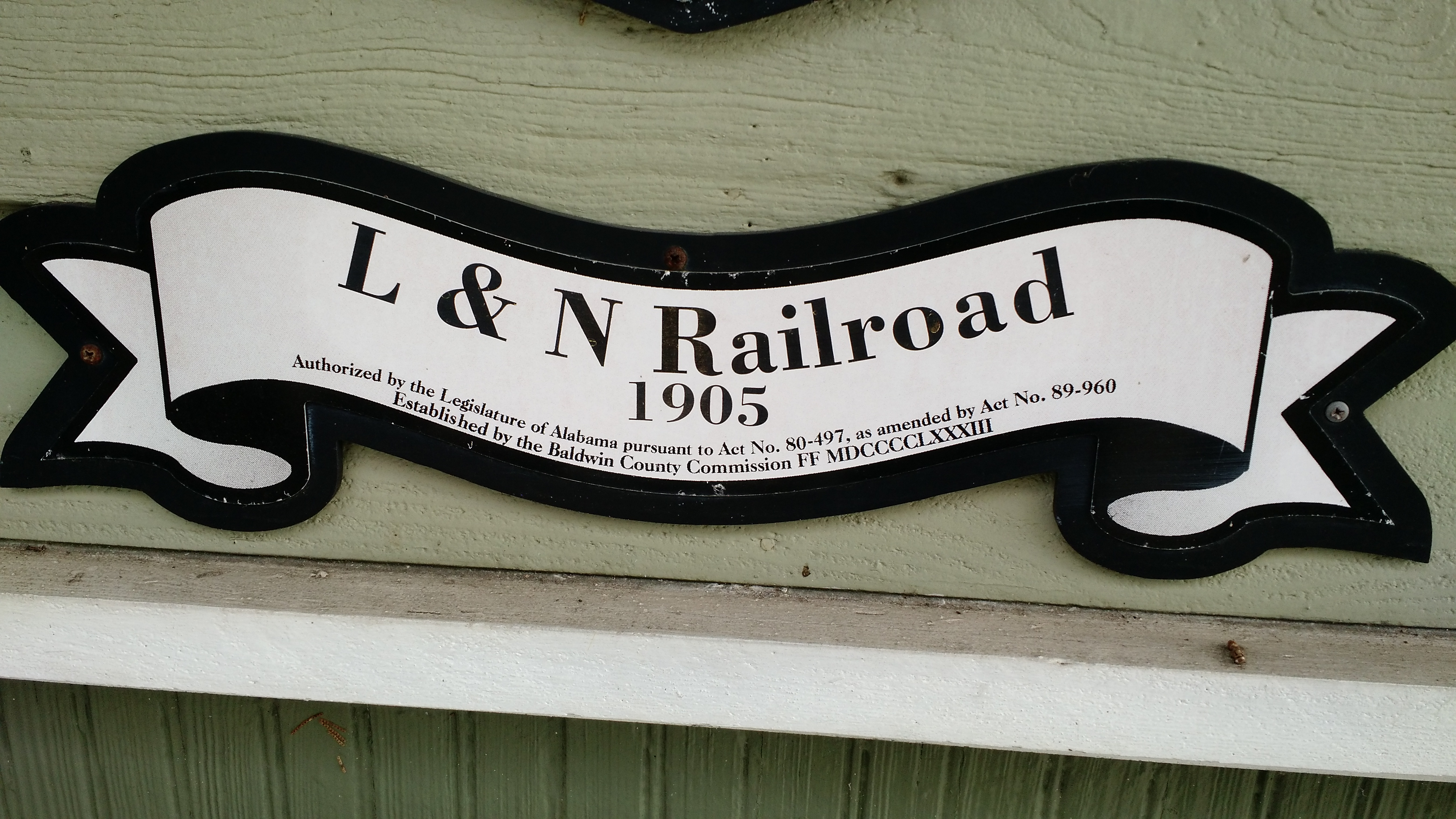
Marker commemorating the build date of the first Louisville and Nashville Railroad depot in Foley- the route would be operational two years later

The trail used to be a section of the Louisville and Nashville Railroad (L&N). Following the formation of the L&N's Bay Minette-Fort Morgan Railway in 1905, the town's founder, John B. Foley, paid to create an extension from Bay Minette to Foley. It was finished in 1907. When it was completed, the Bay Minette-Fort Morgan Railway moniker was scrapped, simply calling it the Louisville and Nashville Railroad. The route remained a part of the L&N until 1971, when passenger service to Foley was scrapped, however, trains continued to use the line until 1984.

In 2007, Perry Wilbourne, the city's administrator, and Bill Goodwin, a volunteer, decided to incorporate roses into the city's landscape. Discussions arose as to what could be done to do this, and converting the unused railroad into a "rose trail" was an idea they enacted. On March 31, 2007, the trail opened to the public. Eventually, signage was added along the trail that gave information regarding the species of roses along the trail. On June 2, 2011, the trail was designated as a National Recreation Trail.

== Route description ==
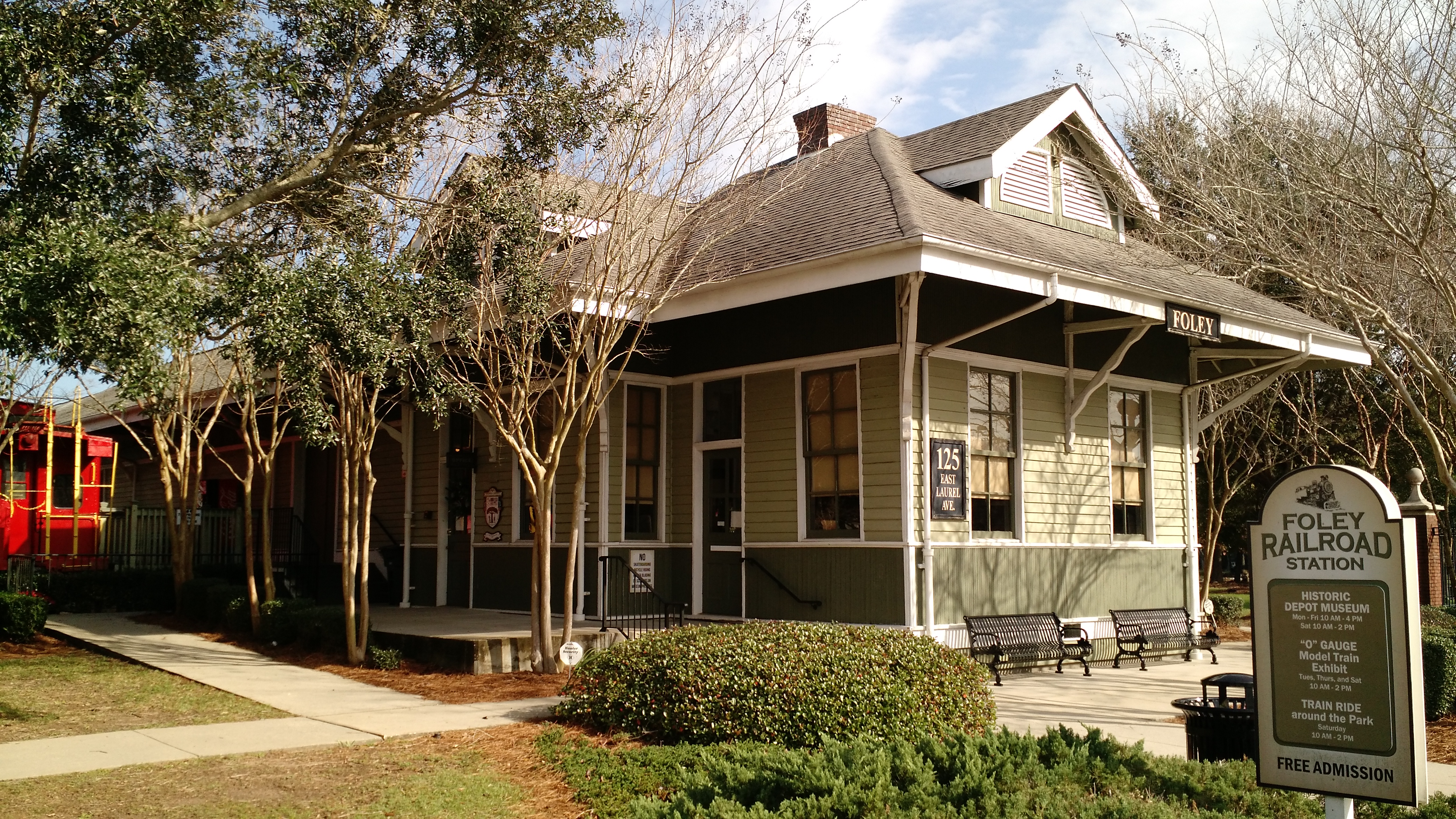
Foley Railroad Depot, located along the trail

The trail runs north–south from East Section Avenue to East Myrtle Avenue. It is parallel to Alabama State Route 59 and crosses U.S. Route 98, as well as Heritage Park. Within Heritage Park is the Foley Railroad Museum, located in a former L&N depot. The first depot was built in 1905 but a fire destroyed it. In 1909, the second depot was completed, which is now the site of the museum.

Over 5,000 individual roses are located along the trail.
