= Prentiss Waggner =

American football player (born 1990)

Profile
- Position: Cornerback

Personal information
- Born: June 28, 1990 (age 36); Clinton, Louisiana
- Listed height: 6 ft 2 in (1.88 m)
- Listed weight: 185 lb (84 kg)

Career information
- High school: Clinton High School
- College: Tennessee
- NFL draft: 2013: undrafted

Career history
- Arizona Cardinals (2013)*
- * Offseason or practice squad member only

Awards and highlights
- Second-team All-SEC (2010)

Prentiss Waggner (born June 28, 1990) is an American former football cornerback. He played college football at Tennessee.

== Early life ==
Waggner attended and played high school football at Clinton High School in Clinton, Louisiana.

== College career ==
Waggner attended the University of Tennessee from 2008–2012 under head coaches Phillip Fulmer, Lane Kiffin, and Derek Dooley. He redshirted in the 2008 season. In the 2009 season, he appeared in 13 games. He had one assisted tackle in the game against Memphis on November 7. He had five total tackles in the game against Ole Miss on November 14. In the 2010 season, he had a larger role on the defense. He had a 54-yard interception return for a touchdown in the season opener against Tennessee-Martin. He had a nine-yard interception return for a touchdown against UAB on September 25. He had two fumble recoveries in the game against Memphis on November 6. He had a 10-yard interception return for a touchdown against Ole Miss on November 13. On the 2010 season, he totaled 57 total tackles, two tackles-for-loss, nine passes defensed, five interceptions, three pick-sixes, and two fumble recoveries. In the 2011 season, he had 48 total tackles, three tackles-for-loss, two sacks, two interceptions, nine passes defensed, and a forced fumble. In the 2012 season, he had 48 total tackles, two tackles-for-loss, two interceptions, six passes defensed, and one forced fumble.

== Professional career ==
Waggner went undrafted in the 2013 NFL draft. He was signed by the Arizona Cardinals on April 29, 2013. He was later cut by the team on May 14.
