= 2010 All-SEC football team =

American football team

The 2010 All-SEC football team consists of American football players selected to the All-Southeastern Conference (SEC) chosen by the Associated Press (AP) and the conference coaches for the 2010 Southeastern Conference football season.

The Auburn Tigers won the conference, beating the South Carolina Gamecocks 56 to 17 in the SEC Championship game. The Tigers then won a national championship, defeating the Pac-12 champion Oregon Ducks 22 to 19 in the 2011 BCS National Championship Game. Auburn led the conference with four consensus first-team All-SEC selections by both the AP and the coaches; LSU was second with three.

Auburn quarterback Cam Newton, a unanimous AP selection, won the Heisman Trophy and was voted AP SEC Offensive Player of the Year. Auburn defensive tackle Nick Fairley, also a unanimous AP selection, won the Lombardi Award and was voted AP SEC Defensive Player of the Year. LSU cornerback Patrick Peterson won the Bednarik Award.

== Offensive selections ==
=== Quarterbacks ===
- Cam Newton*, Auburn (AP-1, Coaches-1)
- Ryan Mallett, Arkansas (AP-2, Coaches-2)

=== Running backs ===
- Marcus Lattimore*, South Carolina (AP-1, Coaches-1)
- Knile Davis, Arkansas (AP-1)
- Stevan Ridley, LSU (AP-2, Coaches-2)
- Mark Ingram II, Alabama (AP-2)

=== Wide receivers ===
- Alshon Jeffery, South Carolina (AP-1, Coaches-1)
- Julio Jones, Alabama (AP-1, Coaches-1)
- Randall Cobb, Kentucky (AP-2, Coaches-2)
- A. J. Green, Georgia (AP-2, Coaches-2)

=== Centers ===
- Ryan Pugh, Auburn (AP-1, Coaches-1)
- Mike Pouncey, Florida (AP-2)
- William Vlachos, Alabama (Coaches-2)

=== Guards ===
- Barrett Jones, Alabama (AP-1, Coaches-2)
- Clint Boling, Georgia (AP-2, Coaches-1)
- Larry Warford, Kentucky (AP-2, Coaches-2)
- Garrett Chisolm, South Carolina (Coaches-2)

=== Tackles ===
- Lee Ziemba*, Auburn (AP-1, Coaches-1)
- Derek Sherrod, Miss. St. (AP-1, Coaches-1)
- DeMarcus Love, Arkansas (AP-1, Coaches-1)
- James Carpenter, Alabama (Coaches-1)
- Joseph Barksdale, LSU (AP-2, Coaches-2)
- Byron Isom, Auburn (AP-2)
- Bradley Sowell, Ole Miss (AP-2)

=== Tight ends ===
- D. J. Williams*, Arkansas (AP-1, Coaches-1)
- Brandon Barden, Vanderbilt (AP-2)
- Orson Charles, Georgia (Coaches-2)

== Defensive selections ==
=== Defensive ends ===
- Devin Taylor, South Carolina (AP-1, Coaches-2)
- Pernell McPhee, Miss. St. (Coaches-1)
- Malik Jackson, Tennessee (AP-2)
- Jake Bequette, Arkansas (AP-2, Coaches-2)
- Antoine Carter, Auburn (AP-2)
- Cliff Matthews, South Carolina (Coaches-2)

=== Defensive tackles ===
- Drake Nevis*, LSU (AP-1, Coaches-1)
- Nick Fairley*, Auburn (AP-1, Coaches-1)
- Marcell Dareus, Alabama (AP-2, Coaches-1)
- Jerrell Powe, Ole Miss (Coaches-2)

=== Linebackers ===
- Justin Houston, Georgia (AP-1, Coaches-1)
- Kelvin Sheppard, LSU (AP-1, Coaches-1)
- Danny Trevathan, Kentucky (AP-1, Coaches-1)
- Chris White, Miss. St. (AP-1, Coaches-2)
- Dont'a Hightower, Alabama (AP-2, Coaches-2)
- Josh Bynes, Auburn (AP-2)
- Akeem Dent, Georgia (AP-2)
- Chris Marve, Vanderbilt (Coaches-2)
- Jerry Franklin, Arkansas (Coaches-2)

=== Cornerbacks ===
- Patrick Peterson*, LSU (AP-1, Coaches-1)
- Janoris Jenkins, Florida (AP-1, Coaches-2)
- Stephon Gilmore, South Carolina (AP-2, Coaches-1)
- Morris Claiborne, LSU (AP-2, Coaches-2)
- Casey Hayward, Vanderbilt (AP-2, Coaches-2)
- Dre Kirkpatrick, Alabama (Coaches-2)

=== Safeties ===
- Ahmad Black, Florida (AP-1, Coaches-1)
- Mark Barron, Alabama (AP-1, Coaches-1)
- Robert Lester, Alabama (AP-2, Coaches-2)
- Prentiss Waggner, Tennessee (AP-2)
- Tramain Thomas, Arkansas (AP-2)
- Janzen Jackson, Tennessee (Coaches-2)

== Special teams ==
=== Kickers ===
- Josh Jasper*, LSU (AP-1, Coaches-2)
- Blair Walsh, Georgia (AP-2, Coaches-1)

=== Punters ===
- Chas Henry, Florida (AP-1, Coaches-1)
- Tyler Campbell, Ole Miss (AP-2)
- Drew Butler, Georgia (Coaches-2)

=== All purpose/return specialist ===
- Patrick Peterson, LSU (AP-2, Coaches-1)
- Randall Cobb, Kentucky (AP-1)
- Trent Richardson, Alabama (Coaches-2)

== Key ==
Bold = Consensus first-team selection by both the coaches and AP

AP = Associated Press

Coaches = Selected by the SEC coaches

* = Unanimous selection of AP

== See also ==
- 2010 Southeastern Conference football season
- 2010 College Football All-America Team
