= Foley High School =

Public high school in Foley, Alabama, United States

Location
- 1 Pride Place; Foley, Alabama 36535; United States; 30°22′53″N 87°41′21″W

Information
- School type: Public
- Motto: Lion Pride
- School district: Baldwin County Public Schools
- CEEB code: 011140
- Principal: Jessica Webb
- Teaching staff: 90.00 (FTE)
- Grades: 9–12
- Enrollment: 1,634 (2023–2024)
- Student to teacher ratio: 18.16
- Colors: Navy Blue and Gold
- Nickname: Lions
- Website: www.foleyhs.com

Foley High School is in Foley, Alabama and is part of the Baldwin County Public Schools System. Foley High School has its own American football, archery, cross-country, baseball, cheerleading, women's/men's soccer, softball, and women's/men's basketball teams. Along with this, there are also men's/women's track, men's/women's golf, men's/women's tennis, men's/women's wrestling, men's swim team, and volleyball teams. The school is well known for its marching and concert band, "The Mighty Band from Lion Land," which has won a Grammy. The band has been winning superior ratings at competitions in the United States since the 1970s and has performed at the Saint Patrick's Day Parade in Chicago, the Daytona 500 race, the Fiesta Bowl parade, and many more places over its long history. Most improvement of any high school football team in the nation prior to the 2026 season.

== Alumni ==
- Justin Anderson (American Football), former linebacker of the Louisiana–Lafayette Ragin' Cajuns and currently a free agent in the NFL.
- D. J. Fluker (American Football), former offensive tackle of the Alabama Crimson Tide who most recently played for the Baltimore Ravens
- Braxton Garrett, first round pick in the 2016 MLB Draft by the Miami Marlins
- Julio Jones (American Football), former wide receiver of the Alabama Crimson Tide who most recently played for the Tampa Bay Buccaneers
- Robert Lester (American Football), former safety of the Alabama Crimson Tide and currently a free agent in the NFL.
- Ken Stabler (American Football), former football quarterback for the Oakland Raiders (1970–1979), the Houston Oilers (1980–1981), and the New Orleans Saints (1982–1984). Pro Football Hall of Fame Class of 2016.
