= Marquis Jackson =

American gridiron football player (born 1990)

Profile
- Position: Defensive end

Personal information
- Born: January 11, 1990 (age 36); Los Angeles, California, U.S.
- Listed height: 6 ft 4 in (1.93 m)
- Listed weight: 260 lb (118 kg)

Career information
- High school: Birmingham (Los Angeles)
- College: Texas Southern, Portland State
- NFL draft: 2013: undrafted

Career history
- Minnesota Vikings (2013)*; Portland Thunder (2014–2015); Chicago Bears (2016)*; BC Lions (2017)*
- * Offseason or practice squad member only

Career AFL statistics
- Tackles: 18
- Sacks: 7.5
- Interceptions: 0
- Forced fumbles: 0
- Pass Deflections: 13
- Stats at ArenaFan.com

Marquis Ferrod Jackson (born January 11, 1990) is an American former professional football player who was a defensive lineman in the National Football League (NFL). He played college football for the Texas Southern Tigers and Portland State Vikings. Jackson signed with the Minnesota Vikings as an undrafted free agent in 2013.

== College career ==
=== Texas Southern ===
Jackson was selected to the first-team All-Southwest Athletic Conference in 2010 and 2011. Also Jackson was a member of the 2010 SWAC Champion team while at Texas Southern. Jackson made 111 tackles, 13 sacks and forced five fumbles while at Texas Southern University. He was initiated into the Tau Epsilon Chapter of Omega Psi Phi while at Texas Southern.

=== Portland State ===
Jackson transferred to Portland State in 2012.

== Professional career ==
Pre-draft measurables
Height	Weight	Arm length	Hand span	40-yard dash	10-yard split	20-yard split	Vertical jump	Broad jump	Bench press
6 ft 3 5/8 in (1.92 m)	263 lb (119 kg)	33 in (0.84 m)	8 3/4 in (0.22 m)	4.98 s	1.74 s	2.93 s	32.5 in (0.83 m)	9 ft 1 in (2.77 m)	20 reps
All values from Pro Day

=== Minnesota Vikings ===
In May 2013, Jackson signed with the Minnesota Vikings as an undrafted free agent following the 2013 NFL draft. In August 2013, Jackson was released.

=== Portland Thunder ===
In 2014, Jackson signed with Portland Thunder of the Arena Football League.

=== Chicago Bears ===
On June 16, 2016, Jackson signed a one-year deal with the Chicago Bears. On August 4, 2016, Jackson was waived by the Bears.

=== BC Lions ===
Jackson signed with the BC Lions on February 21, 2017. He was released on June 13, 2017.

== Personal life ==
His twin brother, Malik, is a former NFL player and Super Bowl 50 champion.
