= Malik Jackson (defensive lineman) =

American football player (born 1990)

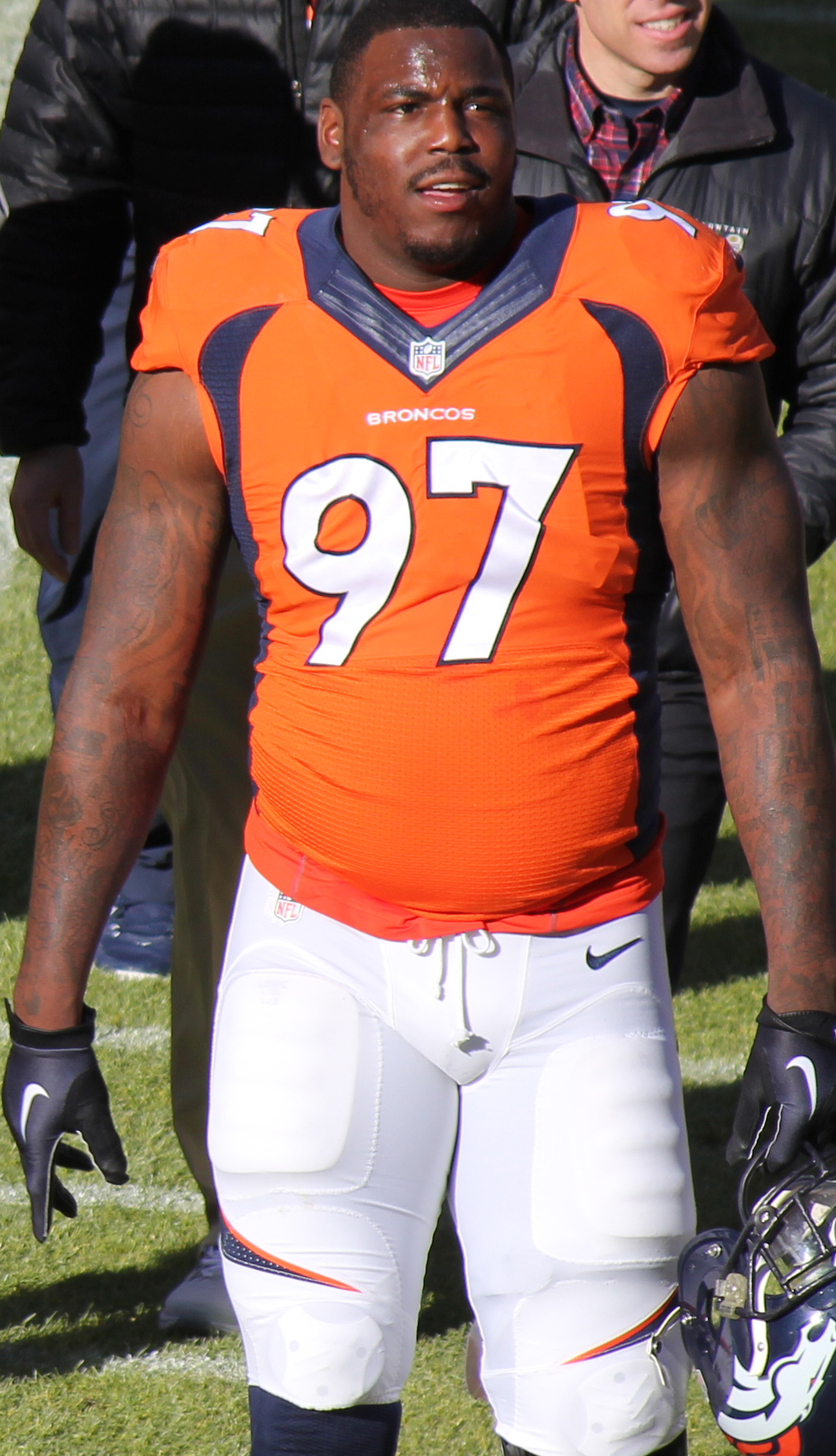
- Jackson with the Denver Broncos in 2014

No. 70, 90, 97
- Position: Defensive tackle

Personal information
- Born: January 11, 1990 (age 36); Los Angeles, California, U.S.
- Listed height: 6 ft 5 in (1.96 m)
- Listed weight: 285 lb (129 kg)

Career information
- High school: Birmingham (Los Angeles)
- College: USC (2008–2009); Tennessee (2010–2011)
- NFL draft: 2012: 5th round, 137th overall pick

Career history
- Denver Broncos (2012–2015); Jacksonville Jaguars (2016–2018); Philadelphia Eagles (2019–2020); Cleveland Browns (2021)

Awards and highlights
- Super Bowl champion (50); Pro Bowl (2017); 2× Second-team All-SEC (2010, 2011)

Career NFL statistics
- Total tackles: 292
- Sacks: 35.5
- Forced fumbles: 6
- Fumble recoveries: 4
- Pass deflections: 29
- Stats at Pro Football Reference

Malik Barron Jackson (born January 11, 1990) is an American former professional football player who was a defensive tackle for 10 seasons in the National Football League (NFL). He played college football for the Tennessee Volunteers. Jackson was selected in the fifth round of the 2012 NFL draft by the Denver Broncos, with whom he won Super Bowl 50 in 2016, in which he scored the game's first touchdown on a fumble recovery. He also played for the Jacksonville Jaguars, Philadelphia Eagles, and Cleveland Browns.

== Early life ==
Jackson attended Birmingham High School, where he played high school football. In 2007, Jackson was named to Super Prep All-Farwest, Prep Star All-West, and Cal-Hi Sports All-State first-team. Jackson was named Los Angeles Daily News All-Area Co-Defensive MVP in high school.

== College career ==
Jackson attended the University of Southern California in 2008 and 2009. He transferred to the University of Tennessee in 2010 to play under head coach Derek Dooley. On November 6, 2010, against the Memphis Tigers, he had his first career collegiate interception, which he returned 44 yards, to go along with two sacks. In the 2010 season, he had 48 total tackles, 11 tackles-for-loss, five sacks, five passes defensed, one forced fumble, and one interception. Jackson was named to the AP All-SEC Second-team in recognition of his performance in the 2010 season. In the 2011 season, he recorded 56 total tackles, 11 tackles-for-loss, 2.5 sacks, two passes defensed, and one forced fumble.

== Professional career ==
=== Pre-draft ===
On January 23, 2012, it was announced that Jackson would play in the 2012 Senior Bowl as a late addition. On January 28, 2012, Jackson played for Washington Redskins' head coach Mike Shanahan's South team that lost 23–13. Jackson attended the NFL Scouting Combine in Indianapolis, Indiana, as a defensive tackle and performed all of the combine drills. His overall performance was well received and he impressed scouts with a 4.91 in the 40-yard dash. On March 26, 2012, he attended Tennessee's pro day, along with Austin Johnson, Tauren Poole, and seven other teammates. Jackson opted to only perform positional drills for the 21 scouts and team representatives that attended. To prepare for the NFL, he put on 20 lbs since the end of the season and weighed in at 290 lbs at Tennessee's pro day. At the conclusion of the pre-draft process, Jackson was projected to be a sixth or seventh round pick by NFL draft experts and scouts. He was ranked the 18th best defensive end prospect in the draft by NFLDraftScout.com.

Pre-draft measurables
Height	Weight	Arm length	Hand span	40-yard dash	10-yard split	20-yard shuttle	Three-cone drill	Vertical jump	Broad jump	Bench press
6 ft 4 3/4 in (1.95 m)	284 lb (129 kg)	33 3/4 in (0.86 m)	9 in (0.23 m)	4.91 s	1.73 s	4.41 s	7.38 s	28 in (0.71 m)	8 ft 9 in (2.67 m)	25 reps
All values from NFL Combine

=== Denver Broncos ===
==== 2012 season ====
The Denver Broncos selected Jackson in the fifth round (137th overall) of the 2012 NFL draft. He was the 27th defensive linemen selected in 2012 and the second defensive linemen drafted by the Denver Broncos after Derek Wolfe (second round, 36th overall).

On May 18, 2012, the Broncos signed Jackson to a four-year, $2.31 million contract that includes a signing bonus of $213,612.

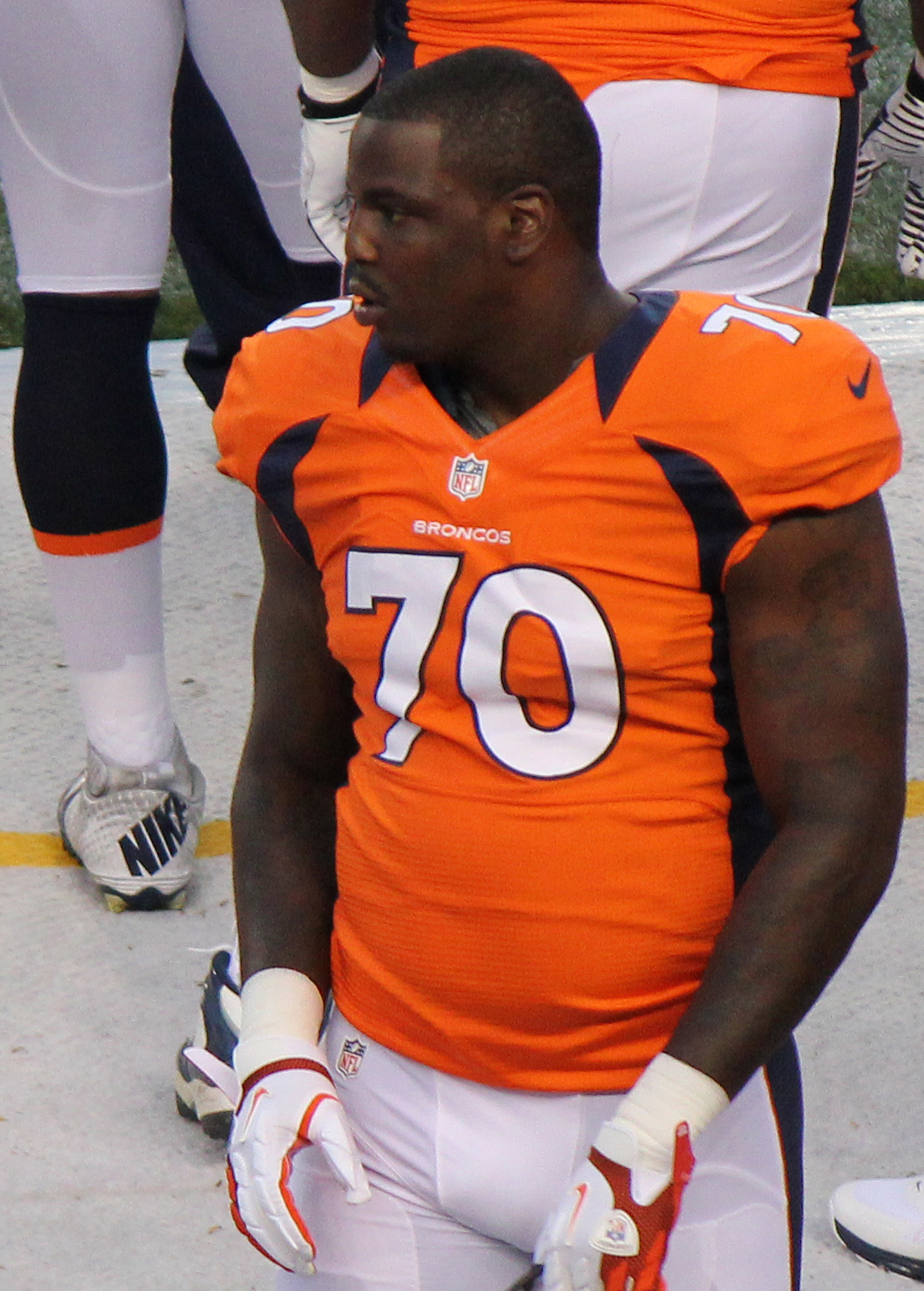
Jackson in 2012

Throughout his first training camp, Jackson competed against Robert Ayers, Derek Wolfe, Jeremy Beal, Ben Garland, Jamie Blatnick, and Jason Hunter for starting defensive end role. Head coach John Fox named him the backup right defensive end behind fellow rookie Derek Wolfe.

On September 17, 2012, Jackson made his NFL debut during a 27–21 loss at the Atlanta Falcons. In the next game against the Houston Texans, he made his first career tackle on running back Arian Foster and stopped him for no gain during the third quarter of a 31–25 loss.

Jackson finished his rookie year with five combined tackles (three solo) in 14 games and no starts. The Broncos finished atop the AFC West in 2012 with a 13–3 record and received a playoff berth and a first round bye. On January 12, 2013, Jackson played in his first NFL playoff game as the Broncos lost to the Baltimore Ravens 38–35 in overtime during the AFC Divisional Round.

==== 2013 season ====
Jackson entered training camp in competing for the starting left defensive end position left vacant after Elvis Dumervil departed for the Baltimore Ravens in free agency. Head coach John Fox named Jackson the backup defensive end behind starters Derek Wolfe and Robert Ayers to start the regular season.

On September 23, 2013, Jackson recorded one tackle assist and was credited with half a sack on Oakland Raiders' quarterback Terrelle Pryor during their 37–21 victory. During a Week 5 matchup at the Dallas Cowboys, he two combined and earned his first career solo sack on quarterback Tony Romo as the Broncos won 51–48. In the next game against the Jacksonville Jaguars, Jackson recorded a season-high seven combined tackles and made a season-high two sacks on quarterback Chad Henne during a 35–19 victory. On December 1, 2013, Jackson earned his first NFL start and made two combined tackles and forced a fumble in a 35–28 road victory against the Kansas City Chiefs. He remained the starting defensive end for the remainder of the season after Derek Wolfe was unable to return after dealing with seizure like symptoms throughout the season.

Jackson finished his second professional season with 42 combined tackles (30 solo), six sacks, four pass deflections, and a forced fumble in 16 games and five starts. The Broncos finished the season atop the AFC West with a 13–3 record. On January 12, 2014, Jackson made his first career postseason start and collected three solo tackles and a sack on San Diego Chargers' quarterback Philip Rivers in Denver's 24–17 victory in the AFC Divisional Round. After defeating the New England Patriots in the AFC Championship, the Denver Broncos played the Seattle Seahawks in Super Bowl XLVIII. Jackson started the game at defensive end and made five combined tackles and a pass deflection as the Broncos were routed by Seattle 43–8.

==== 2014 season ====
Jackson entered the season the backup right defensive end behind Derek Wolfe after the Denver Broncos signed free agent DeMarcus Ware who was named the starting left defensive end. On December 7, 2014, Jackson recorded a season-high six solo tackles and sacked Kyle Orton during a 24–17 victory over the Buffalo Bills.

Jackson finished his third season with 42 combined tackles (33 solo), three sacks, four pass deflections, and a forced fumble in 16 games and three starts. After finishing the season 12–4 and atop the AFC West, the Broncos went on to the AFC Divisional Round. Jackson started the game and recorded four combined tackles as the Broncos were defeated by the Indianapolis Colts 24–13.

==== 2015 season ====
Throughout his first training camp under new head coach Gary Kubiak, Jackson competed against Antonio Smith and Vance Walker for the starting left defensive end role. Defensive coordinator Wade Phillips employed a 3–4 defensive scheme that moved DeMarcus Ware to outside linebacker, vacating his defensive end position. He was named the starting defensive end to start the season, alongside Vance Walker, who was replacing Derek Wolfe, while he served a four-game suspension.

During Week 5 against the Oakland Raiders, Jackson recorded six combined tackles and sacked quarterback Derek Carr during a 16–10 road victory. Three weeks later, he collected two combined tackles, deflected a pass, and recorded the first safety of his career in a 29–10 victory over the Green Bay Packers. He made the safety after tackling tight end Richard Rodgers in the end zone during the fourth quarter. He finished the season with a career-high 45 combined tackles (34 solo), seven pass deflections, five sacks, and a safety in 16 games and starts.

The Broncos finished the season atop the AFC West with a 12–4 record. After defeating the Pittsburgh Steelers and the New England Patriots, the Broncos went on to play in Super Bowl 50. In the first quarter of the Super Bowl, Jackson scored his only career touchdown after recovering a fumble in the end zone by Cam Newton that was forced by linebacker Von Miller, who would go on to win Super Bowl MVP. The touchdown gave the Broncos an early 10–0 lead and Jackson went on to record five combined tackles in the Broncos' 24–10 victory over the Carolina Panthers.

=== Jacksonville Jaguars ===
On March 9, 2016, the Jacksonville Jaguars signed Jackson to a six-year, $85.5 million contract with $31.5 million guaranteed and a signing bonus of $10 million.

==== 2016 season ====
Under head coach Gus Bradley, Jackson returned to a 4–3 defensive scheme and was named the starting defensive end to start the season. Jackson chose to wear No. 90 after he was unable to receive No. 97 since it was already issued to Roy Miller.

During Week 3 against the Baltimore Ravens, Jackson collected two combined tackles and recorded his first sack as a Jaguar on quarterback Joe Flacco in a 19–17 loss. The following week, he collected a season-high five combined tackles and deflected a pass during a 30–27 victory over the Indianapolis Colts. During a Week 12 matchup at the Buffalo Bills, Jackson made five combined tackles and sacked Tyrod Taylor twice in a 28–21 loss. On January 1, 2017, he recorded two solo tackles and made two sacks on Colts' quarterback Andrew Luck as the Jaguars lost 24–20.

Jackson finished his first season with the Jaguars with 33 combined tackles (28 solo), 6.5 sacks, and four pass deflections in 16 games and starts.

==== 2017 season ====
Offensive line coach Doug Marrone was hired as the new head coach and opted to maintain defensive coordinator Todd Wash and their 4–3 defense. Marrone chose to switch Jackson from defensive end to defensive tackle to start the 2017 season. He joined a stout defensive line that consisted of Yannick Ngakoue, Dante Fowler, Marcell Dareus, and was headed by Calais Campbell. They adopted the name "Sacksonville" and became one of the top defensive lines in the league.

Jackson started in the season-opener at the Houston Texans and made three solo tackles, deflected a pass, and a sack during a 29–7 road victory. On December 19, 2017, Jackson was named to his first Pro Bowl.

Jackson finished the 2017 season with three passes defensed, four forced fumbles, eight sacks, and 40 total tackles as the Jaguars finished with a 10–6 record and finished atop the AFC South. In the Wild Card Round against the Buffalo Bills, Jackson started the game and recorded a sack and tackle in the 10–3 victory. Pro Football Focus gave Jackson an overall grade of 86.4, which ranked 17th among all qualifying interior defensive linemen.

==== 2018 season ====
During Week 4 against the New York Jets, Jackson made his first sack of the season when he sacked rookie quarterback Sam Darnold in the 31–12 win. Prior to the Week 11 matchup against the Pittsburgh Steelers, he was benched as a result of his poor quality of play. Without Jackson starting, the Jaguars lost to the Steelers by a score of 20–16. During Week 16 against the Miami Dolphins, Jackson made his first sack in almost three months when he sacked Ryan Tannehill in the 17–7 road victory. In the regular-season finale against the Houston Texans the following week, he made a season-high 1.5 sacks in the 20–3 road loss. He finished the 2018 season with 3.5 sacks, 32 total tackles, 12 quarterback hits, and one pass defensed.

On March 8, 2019, Jackson was released by the Jaguars due to salary cap issues.

=== Philadelphia Eagles ===
On March 13, 2019, Jackson signed a three-year $30 million contract with the Philadelphia Eagles. During the season-opener against the Washington Redskins, Jackson suffered a foot injury. He was placed on injured reserve on September 10, 2019. In the 2020 season, Jackson appeared in 15 games and started six. He had 2.5 sacks, 28 total tackles, 13 quarterback hits, and two passes defensed. On March 17, 2021, the Eagles released Jackson.

=== Cleveland Browns ===
Jackson signed with the Cleveland Browns on March 23, 2021. He appeared in and started 16 games for the Browns in the 2021 season.

=== Retirement ===
Jackson announced his retirement in July 2023.

== NFL career statistics ==
Legend
	Won the Super Bowl
**Bold**	Career high

=== Regular season ===
Year	Team	Games		Tackles					Interceptions						Fumbles		
Year	Team	GP	GS	Cmb	Solo	Ast	Sck	Sfty	PD	Int	Yds	Avg	Lng	TD	FF	FR	TD
2012	DEN	14	0	5	3	2	0.0	—	0	—	—	—	—	—	0	0	0
2013	DEN	**16**	5	42	30	12	6.0	—	4	—	—	—	—	—	1	0	0
2014	DEN	**16**	3	42	33	9	3.0	—	4	—	—	—	—	—	1	0	0
2015	DEN	**16**	**16**	**45**	**34**	11	5.5	**1**	**7**	—	—	—	—	—	0	**2**	0
2016	JAX	**16**	**16**	33	28	5	6.5	—	4	—	—	—	—	—	0	1	0
2017	JAX	**16**	**16**	40	31	9	**8.0**	—	3	—	—	—	—	—	**4**	0	0
2018	JAX	**16**	10	32	25	7	3.5	—	1	—	—	—	—	—	0	0	0
2019	PHI	1	1	0	0	0	0.0	—	0	—	—	—	—	—	0	0	0
2020	PHI	15	6	28	15	13	2.5	—	2	—	—	—	—	—	0	1	0
2021	CLE	**16**	**16**	25	7	**18**	0.5	—	4	—	—	—	—	—	0	0	0
Career		142	89	292	206	86	35.5	1	29	0	0	0.0	0	0	6	4	0

=== Postseason ===
Year	Team	Games		Tackles					Interceptions						Fumbles		
Year	Team	GP	GS	Cmb	Solo	Ast	Sck	Sfty	PD	Int	Yds	Avg	Lng	TD	FF	FR	TD
2012	DEN	1	0	0	0	0	0.0	—	0	—	—	—	—	—	0	0	0
2013	DEN	**3**	**3**	8	7	1	**1.0**	—	**2**	—	—	—	—	—	0	0	0
2014	DEN	1	1	4	1	3	0.0	—	0	—	—	—	—	—	0	0	0
2015	DEN	**3**	**3**	**9**	**8**	**1**	0.0	—	0	—	—	—	—	—	0	**1**	**1**
2017	JAX	**3**	**3**	8	6	2	**1.0**	—	1	—	—	—	—	—	0	0	0
Career		11	10	29	22	7	2.0	0	3	0	0	0.0	0	0	0	1	1

== Personal life ==
His twin brother, Marquis, was a defensive end at Texas Southern University then Portland State.
