= Super Bowl 50 =

2016 National Football League championship game

Carolina Panthers (1) (NFC) (15–1)	Denver Broncos (1) (AFC) (12–4)
10	24
Head coach: Ron Rivera	Head coach: Gary Kubiak
	1	2	3	4	Total
CAR	0	7	0	3	10
DEN	10	3	3	8	24
- Date: February 7, 2016
- Kickoff time: 3:30 p.m. PST (UTC-8)
- Stadium: Levi's Stadium; Santa Clara, California
- MVP: Von Miller, linebacker
- Favorite: Panthers by 5.5
- Referee: Clete Blakeman
- Attendance: 71,088

Ceremonies
- National anthem: Lady Gaga
- Coin toss: Fred Biletnikoff, Marcus Allen, Joe Montana, Jim Plunkett, Jerry Rice, Steve Young
- Halftime show: Coldplay featuring Beyoncé and Bruno Mars with Mark Ronson

TV in the United States
- Network: CBS
- Announcers: Jim Nantz (play-by-play); Phil Simms (color analyst); Tracy Wolfson and Evan Washburn (sideline reporters); Mike Carey (rules expert)
- Nielsen ratings: 46.6 (national); 53.9 (Denver); 55.9 (Charlotte); U.S. viewership: 111.9 million est. avg., 167.0 million est. total
- Market share: 72 (national)
- Cost of 30-second commercial: $5 million

Radio in the United States
- Network: Westwood One
- Announcers: Kevin Harlan (play-by-play); Boomer Esiason and Dan Fouts (analysts); James Lofton and Mark Malone (sideline reporters)

Super Bowl 50 was an American football game to determine the champion of the National Football League (NFL) for the 2015 season. The American Football Conference (AFC) champion Denver Broncos defeated the National Football Conference (NFC) champion Carolina Panthers, 24–10. The game was played on February 7, 2016, at Levi's Stadium in Santa Clara, California, in the San Francisco Bay Area. As this was the 50th Super Bowl game, the league emphasized the "golden anniversary" with various gold-themed initiatives during the 2015 season, as well as suspending the tradition of naming each Super Bowl game with Roman numerals (under which the game would have been known as "Super Bowl L") for this Super Bowl, so the logo could prominently feature the number 50 in more familiar Arabic numerals. The NFL went back to Roman numerals the next year for Super Bowl LI. This was also the last Super Bowl logo to include the stadium in the background.

The Panthers finished the regular season with a 15–1 record, racking up the league's top offense, and quarterback Cam Newton was named the NFL Most Valuable Player (MVP). They defeated the Arizona Cardinals 49–15 in the NFC Championship Game and advanced to their second Super Bowl appearance since the franchise began playing in 1995. The Broncos finished the regular season with a 12–4 record, bolstered by having the league's top defense. The Broncos defeated the defending Super Bowl champion New England Patriots 20–18 in the AFC Championship Game, joining the Patriots, Dallas Cowboys, and Pittsburgh Steelers as one of four teams that have made eight appearances in the Super Bowl. This marked the fourth time in history that the Super Bowl pitted the top defense against the top offense, after Super Bowls XXV, XXXVII and XLVIII.

In one of the most defensive matchups in Super Bowl history, the Broncos took an early lead that they never lost. The Broncos recorded seven sacks and forced four turnovers. The Panthers kept pace by recording five sacks and forcing two turnovers. Broncos linebacker Von Miller was named Super Bowl MVP. This game was the final game of Peyton Manning's career; the Broncos quarterback, who also won Super Bowl XLI, announced his retirement in March 2016. The Broncos' win also extended the NFL's record streak of unique champions to eight, which would end after this year. It is currently tied with the NBA (2019–26) for the third-longest such streak in American sports history, with Major League Baseball having nine (1982–90) and ten (1978–87) year streaks.

CBS' broadcast of the game was the sixth most-watched program in American television history with an average of 111.9 million viewers. The network charged an average of $5 million for a 30-second commercial during the game. The Super Bowl 50 halftime show was headlined by Coldplay, with special guest performers Beyoncé and Bruno Mars.

== Background ==
=== Host selection process ===
In early 2012, NFL Commissioner Roger Goodell stated that the league planned to make the 50th Super Bowl "spectacular" and that it would be "an important game for us as a league".

Cities included in early discussions or that submitted bids included:

- AT&T Stadium in Texas
- Mercedes-Benz Superdome in New Orleans, Louisiana
- Levi's Stadium in Santa Clara, California
- Sun Life Stadium in Miami Gardens, Florida
- CenturyLink Field in Seattle, Washington
- An unidentified stadium in the Los Angeles, California metropolitan area. The Los Angeles bid (intended to be an homage to the first Super Bowl, which was held at the Memorial Coliseum in the city) was dependent on a team relocating to the area by the time the site was selected and having a new stadium built by the time of the game. No team requested to relocate by the time the site was selected, and Los Angeles was pulled from consideration. Los Angeles was then put into consideration for Super Bowl LIV.

The league eventually narrowed the bids to three sites: New Orleans' Mercedes-Benz Superdome, Miami's Sun Life Stadium, and Santa Clara's Levi's Stadium.

The league announced on October 16, 2012, that the two finalists were Sun Life Stadium and Levi's Stadium. The South Florida/Miami area had previously hosted the event 10 times (tied for most with New Orleans), with the most recent one being Super Bowl XLIV in 2010. The San Francisco Bay Area last hosted in 1985 (Super Bowl XIX), held at Stanford Stadium in Stanford, California, won by the home team 49ers. The Miami bid depended on whether the stadium underwent renovations. However, on May 3, 2013, the Florida legislature refused to approve the funding plan to pay for the renovations, dealing a significant blow to Miami's chances.

On May 21, 2013, NFL owners at their spring meetings in Boston voted and awarded the game to Levi's Stadium. The $1.2 billion stadium opened in 2014. It was the first Super Bowl held in the Bay Area since Super Bowl XIX was held at Stanford Stadium in 1985 following the 1984 season, and the first held in California since Super Bowl XXXVII held at Qualcomm Stadium in San Diego in 2003.

=== Teams ===
For the third straight season, the number one seeds in the NFC and AFC, the Carolina Panthers and Denver Broncos, met in the Super Bowl. The game also featured the league's top scoring offense (Panthers) against the league's top defense (Broncos). The Panthers became the 10th team since 1960 to have lost just one game during the regular season, and the sixth team ever to have a 15–1 record. It was their second Super Bowl appearance; the other was Super Bowl XXXVIII. The Broncos became the fourth team to have eight Super Bowl appearances, then the NFL record. It was their second appearance in three years, having also reached Super Bowl XLVIII. Coincidentally, John Fox was the head coach of each team in their previous Super Bowl appearance.

==== Carolina Panthers ====
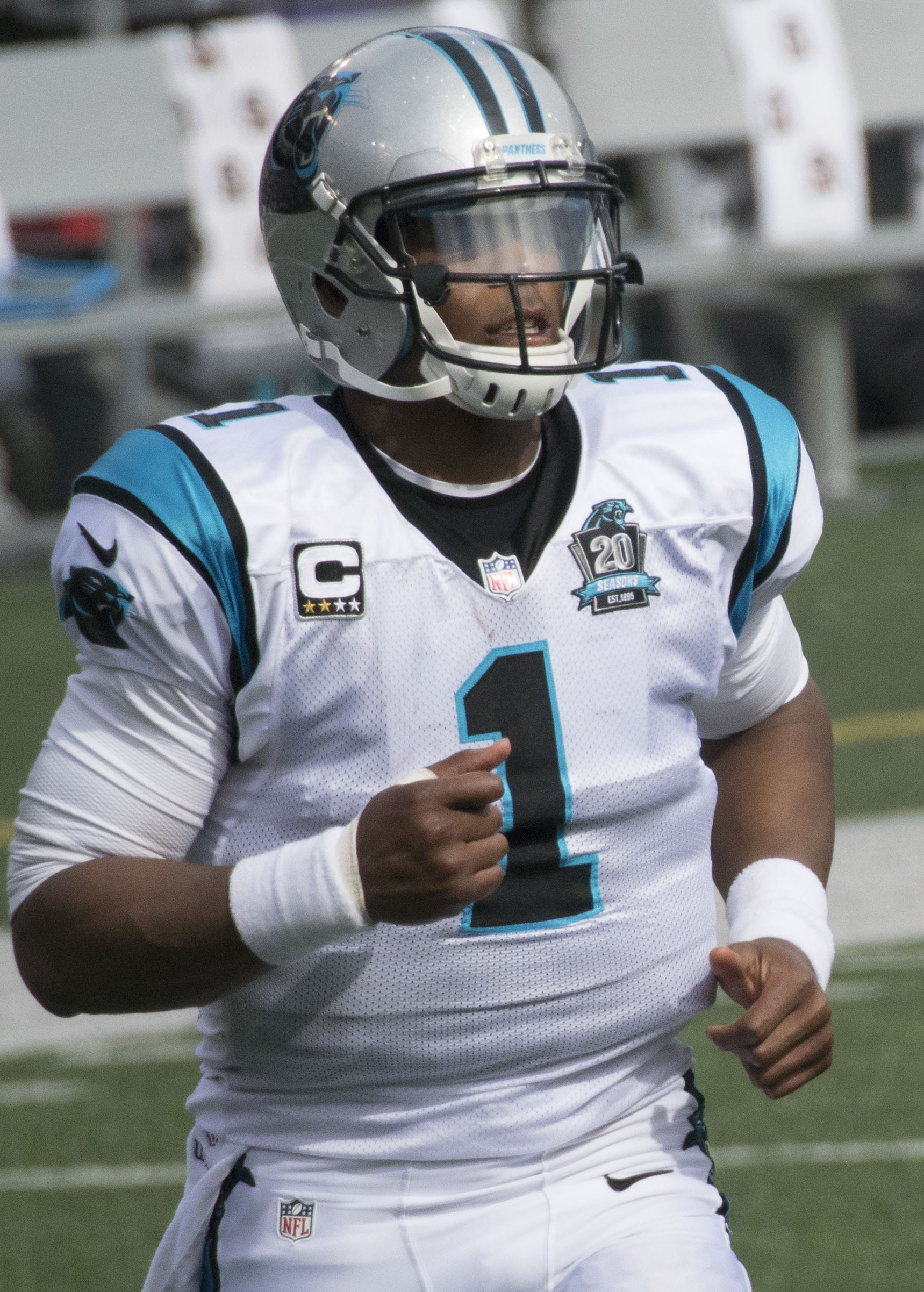
Panthers quarterback Cam Newton was named the 2015 regular season MVP.

Despite waiving long-time running back DeAngelo Williams and losing top wide receiver Kelvin Benjamin to a torn ACL in the preseason, the Carolina Panthers had their best regular season in franchise history, becoming the seventh team to win at least 15 regular season games since the league expanded to a 16-game schedule in 1978. Carolina started the season 14–0, not only setting franchise records for the best start and the longest single-season winning streak, but also posting the best start to a season by an NFC team in NFL history, breaking the 13–0 record previously shared with the 2009 New Orleans Saints and the 2011 Green Bay Packers. With their NFC-best 15–1 regular season record, the Panthers clinched home-field advantage throughout the NFC playoffs for the first time in franchise history. Ten players were selected to the Pro Bowl (the most in franchise history) along with eight All-Pro selections.

The Panthers' offense, which led the NFL in scoring (500 points), was loaded with talent, boasting six Pro Bowl selections. Pro Bowl quarterback and regular season MVP Cam Newton had one of his best seasons, throwing for 3,837 yards and rushing for 636 yards, while recording a career-high and league-leading 45 total touchdowns (35 passing, 10 rushing), a career-low 10 interceptions, and a career-best quarterback rating of 99.4. Newton's leading receivers were tight end Greg Olsen, who caught a career-high 77 passes for 1,104 yards and seven touchdowns, and wide receiver Ted Ginn Jr., who caught 44 passes for 739 yards and 10 touchdowns; Ginn also rushed for 60 yards and returned 27 punts for 277 yards. Other key receivers included veteran Jerricho Cotchery (39 receptions for 485 yards), rookie Devin Funchess (31 receptions for 473 yards and five touchdowns), and second-year receiver Corey Brown (31 receptions for 447 yards). The Panthers' backfield featured Pro Bowl running back Jonathan Stewart, who led the team with 989 rushing yards and six touchdowns in 13 games, along with Pro Bowl fullback Mike Tolbert, who rushed for 256 yards and caught 18 passes for another 154 yards. Carolina's offensive line also featured two Pro Bowl selections: center Ryan Kalil and guard Trai Turner.

The Panthers' defense gave up just 308 points, ranking sixth in the league, while also leading the NFL in interceptions with 24 and boasting four Pro Bowl selections. Pro Bowl defensive tackle Kawann Short led the team in sacks with 11, while also forcing three fumbles and recovering two. Fellow lineman Mario Addison added 6 1/2 sacks. The Panthers defensive line also featured veteran defensive end Jared Allen, a five-time Pro Bowl selection, who was the NFL's active career sack leader with 136, along with defensive end Kony Ealy, who had five sacks in just nine starts. Behind them, two of the Panthers' three starting linebackers were also selected to play in the Pro Bowl: Thomas Davis and future Hall-of-Famer Luke Kuechly. Davis compiled 5 1/2 sacks, four forced fumbles, and four interceptions, while Kuechly led the team in tackles (118) forced two fumbles, and intercepted four passes of his own. Carolina's secondary featured Pro Bowl safety Kurt Coleman, who led the team with a career-high seven interceptions, while also racking up 88 tackles and Pro Bowl cornerback Josh Norman, who developed into a shutdown corner during the season and had four interceptions, two of which were returned for touchdowns.

==== Denver Broncos ====
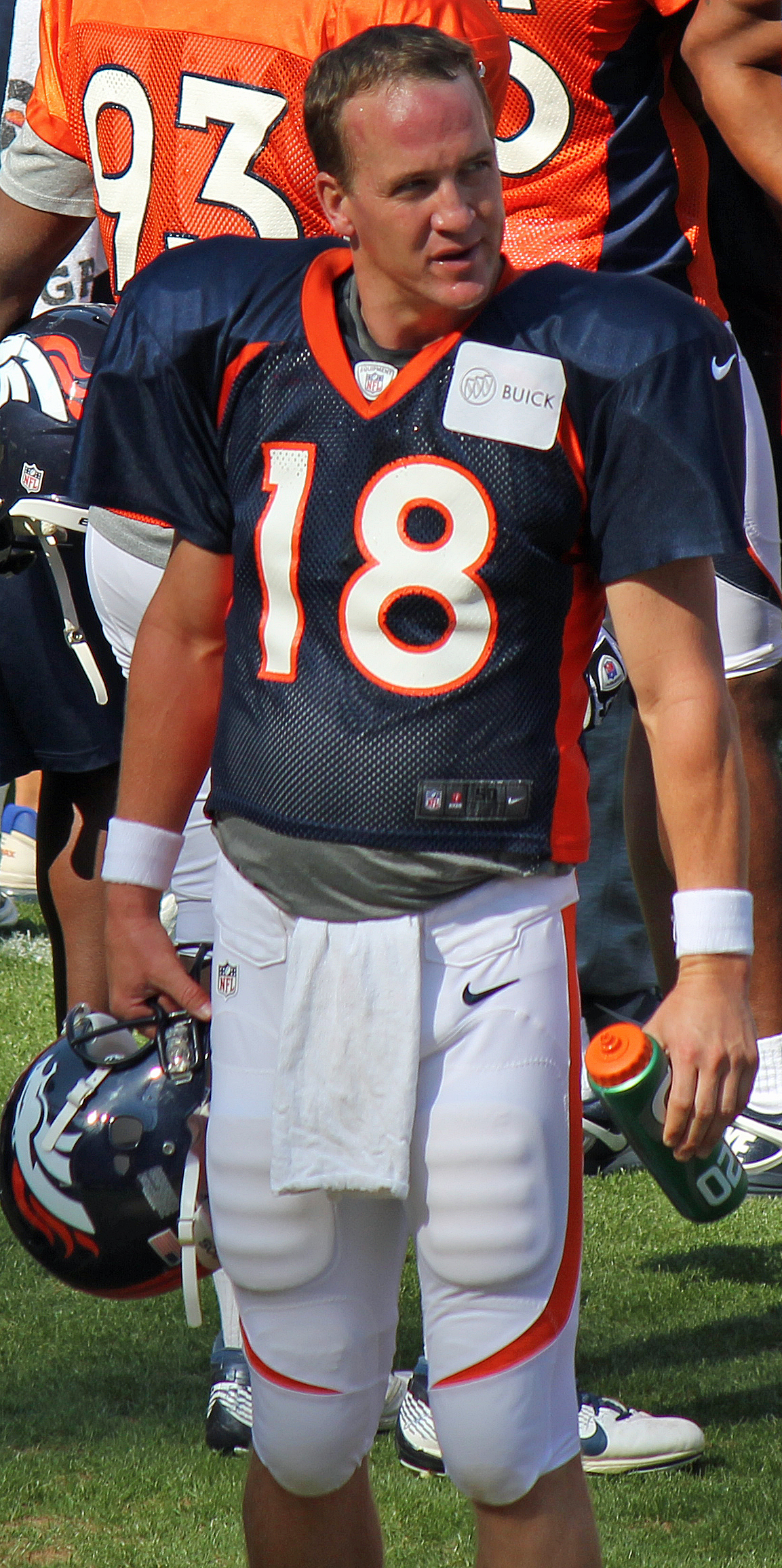
Broncos quarterback Peyton Manning was making his fourth Super Bowl appearance.

After losing in the divisional round of the playoffs during three of the previous four seasons, the Denver Broncos' general manager John Elway made numerous coaching changes, including a mutual parting with head coach John Fox, who had won four divisional championships in his four years as Broncos head coach, being replaced in that role by Gary Kubiak, Elway's former backup quarterback and former Broncos offensive coordinator. Wade Phillips, a former Broncos head coach, returned to the team to serve his second stint as defensive coordinator, succeeding Jack Del Rio who had left to take the head coaching vacancy at the Oakland Raiders. The team's 43–8 loss in Super Bowl XLVIII two years earlier, despite holding the regular season's top offense, resulted in Elway signing defensive end DeMarcus Ware, cornerback Aqib Talib, safety T. J. Ward, and wide receiver Emmanuel Sanders for the 2014 season.

Under Kubiak, the Broncos planned to install a run-oriented offense with zone blocking to blend in with quarterback Peyton Manning's shotgun passing style, but struggled with numerous changes and injuries to the offensive line, as well as the aging and injured Manning having his worst statistical season since his rookie year with the Indianapolis Colts in 1998. In addition to turning 39 in the 2015 offseason, Manning suffered a plantar fasciitis injury in his heel during the summer. Though the team had a 7–0 start, Manning led the NFL in interceptions. In Week 10, Manning suffered a partial tear of the plantar fascia in his left foot. He set the NFL's all-time record for career passing yards in this game, but after throwing four interceptions, he was benched in favor of backup quarterback Brock Osweiler, who took over as the starter for most of the remainder of the regular season. After a slow start in Denver's final regular season game against San Diego, Osweiler was benched leading to Manning's return. Manning reclaimed the starting quarterback position for the playoffs by leading the team to a key 27–20 win that enabled the team to clinch the AFC's No. 1 seed. Under defensive coordinator Wade Phillips, who replaced his predecessor's complicated read-and-react scheme with a simple aggressive approach of attacking the ball, the Broncos' defense ranked No. 1 in total yards allowed, passing yards allowed and sacks, and like the previous three seasons, the team continued to set numerous individual, league and franchise records. With the defense carrying the team despite the issues with the offense, the Broncos finished the regular season with a 12–4 record and earned home-field advantage throughout the AFC playoffs.

Manning finished the year with a career-low 67.9 passer rating, throwing for 2,249 yards and nine touchdowns, with 17 interceptions. Osweiler threw for 1,967 yards and put up a better TD:INT ratio (10 touchdowns to six interceptions) for a higher rating of 86.4, but remained benched during the postseason in favor of Manning. Veteran receiver Demaryius Thomas led the team with 105 receptions for 1,304 yards and six touchdowns, while Emmanuel Sanders caught 76 passes for 1,135 yards and six scores, while adding another 106 yards returning punts. Tight end Owen Daniels was also a big element of the passing game with 46 receptions for 517 yards. Midway through the season, Denver acquired veteran tight end Vernon Davis, who finished the year with 38 receptions for 395 yards. Running back C. J. Anderson was the team's leading rusher 863 yards and seven touchdowns, while also catching 25 passes for 183 yards. Running back Ronnie Hillman also made a big impact with 720 yards, five touchdowns, 24 receptions, and a 4.2 yards per carry average. Overall, the offense ranked 19th in scoring with 355 points and did not have any Pro Bowl selections.

The Broncos' defense ranked first in the NFL yards allowed (4,530) for the first time in franchise history, and fourth in points allowed (296). Defensive ends Derek Wolfe and Malik Jackson each had 5 1/2 sacks. Pro Bowl linebacker Von Miller led the team with 11 sacks, forced four fumbles, and recovered three. Linebacker DeMarcus Ware was selected to play in the Pro Bowl for the ninth time in his career, ranking second on the team with 7 1/2 sacks. Linebacker Brandon Marshall led the team in total tackles with 109, while Danny Trevathan ranked second with 102 tackles. Cornerbacks Aqib Talib (three interceptions) and Chris Harris Jr. (two interceptions) were the other two Pro Bowl selections from the defense, though none of the players selected for the Pro Bowl participated due to the Broncos reaching Super Bowl 50.

=== Playoffs ===
The Panthers defeated the Seattle Seahawks 31–24 in the NFC divisional round. The Panthers then defeated the Arizona Cardinals in the NFC Championship Game 49–15, racking up 487 yards and forcing seven turnovers.

The Broncos defeated the Pittsburgh Steelers 23–16 in the AFC divisional round, by scoring 11 points in the final three minutes of the game. The next week, they defeated the defending Super Bowl XLIX champion New England Patriots in the AFC Championship Game 20–18, by intercepting a pass on a New England 2-point conversion attempt that followed a Gronkowski touchdown reception with 17 seconds left on the clock. The Broncos recovered the subsequent onside kick attempt ensuring victory.

=== Pre-game notes ===
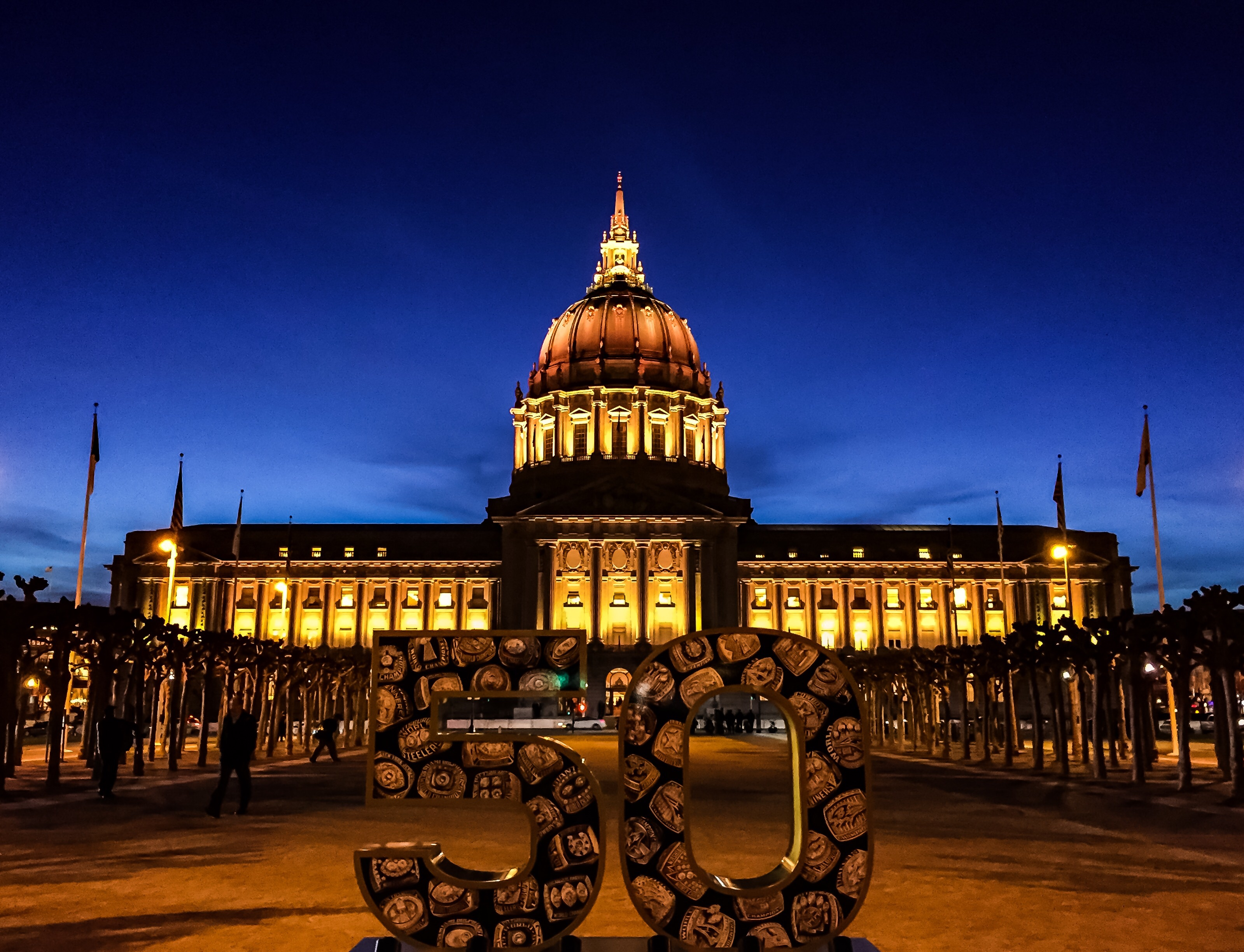
San Francisco City Hall lit in gold, three days before Super Bowl 50

Carolina suffered a major setback when Thomas Davis, an 11-year veteran who had already overcome three ACL tears in his career, went down with a broken arm in the NFC Championship Game. Despite this, he insisted he would still find a way to play in the Super Bowl. His prediction turned out to be accurate and he made it into the starting lineup.

Peyton Manning reached his fourth Super Bowl, with appearances under as many head coaches (Tony Dungy, Jim Caldwell, John Fox, and Gary Kubiak). He became the first quarterback ever to lead two teams to multiple Super Bowls. He was also the oldest quarterback ever to play in a Super Bowl at age 39. The previous record was held by John Elway, who led the Broncos to victory in Super Bowl XXXIII at age 38 and is currently Denver's Executive Vice President of Football Operations and General Manager.

Manning and Newton set the record for the largest age difference between opposing Super Bowl quarterbacks at 13 years and 48 days (Manning was 39, Newton was 26). In addition, this was the first Super Bowl to feature a quarterback on both teams who was the #1 pick in their draft classes. Manning was the No. 1 selection of the 1998 NFL draft, while Newton was picked first in 2011. The matchup also pits the top two picks of the 2011 draft against each other: Newton for Carolina and Von Miller for Denver.

With Ron Rivera having been a linebacker with the Chicago Bears in Super Bowl XX, and Kubiak replacing Elway at the end of the Broncos' defeats in Super Bowls XXI and XXIV, this was the first Super Bowl in which both head coaches played in the game themselves; coincidentally, the coaches they had played under, Mike Ditka (Rivera) and Dan Reeves (Kubiak), not only had Super Bowl playing experience themselves, but had done so as teammates with the Dallas Cowboys in Super Bowls V and VI (and worked together as Cowboys assistant coaches for Super Bowls X, XII and XIII).

Concerns were raised over whether Levi's Stadium's field was of a high enough quality to host a Super Bowl; during the inaugural season, the field had to be re-sodded multiple times due to various issues, and earlier in the 2015 season, a portion of the turf collapsed under Baltimore Ravens kicker Justin Tucker, causing him to slip and miss a field goal, although the field has not had any major issues since. As is customary for Super Bowl games played at natural grass stadiums, the NFL re-sodded the hybrid Bermuda 419 turf playing surface prior to the game; NFL and Atlanta Braves field director Ed Mangan stated that the field was in "great shape" for the game. However, the turf showed problems throughout the game, with a number of players needing to change their cleats during the game and players slipping during plays all throughout the game.

As the designated home team in the annual rotation between AFC and NFC teams, the Broncos elected to wear their road white jerseys with matching white pants. Elway stated, "We've had Super Bowl success in our white uniforms." The Broncos last wore matching white jerseys and pants in the Super Bowl in Super Bowl XXXIII, Elway's last game as Denver QB, when they defeated the Atlanta Falcons 34–19. In their only other Super Bowl win in Super Bowl XXXII, Denver wore blue jerseys, which was their primary color at the time. They also lost Super Bowl XXI when they wore white jerseys, but they are 0–4 in Super Bowls when wearing orange jerseys, losing in Super Bowl XII, XXII, XXIV, and XLVIII. The only other AFC champion team to have worn white as the designated home team in the Super Bowl was the Pittsburgh Steelers; they defeated the Seattle Seahawks 21–10 in Super Bowl XL 10 seasons prior. The Broncos' decision to wear white meant the Panthers would wear their standard home uniform: black jerseys with silver pants.

==== Team facilities ====
The Panthers used the San Jose State practice facility and stayed at the San Jose Marriott. The Broncos practiced at Stanford University, the alma mater of General Manager John Elway, and stayed at the Santa Clara Marriott.

==== Marketing ====
On June 4, 2014, the NFL announced that the game would be branded with Arabic numerals as "Super Bowl 50"—rather than with Roman numerals, a practice established at Super Bowl V under which the game would have been known as "Super Bowl L". NFL creative director Shandon Melvin explained that a primary reason for the change was the difficulty in designing an aesthetically pleasing logo with the letter "L" using the standardized logo template introduced at Super Bowl XLV. He noted that "L" was harder to design around as it is asymmetrical unlike other Roman numerals, and also showed concerns that use of the letter "L" could be interpreted as the "loser" hand gesture. 73 mockups, incorporating either "L" or "50", were designed before the final design was chosen, which featured large numerals colored in gold behind the Vince Lombardi Trophy, instead of underneath and in silver as in the standard logo.

Tying into the game's "golden anniversary," various gold-themed promotions and initiatives were held throughout the 2015 NFL season. The league adopted a gold-tinted logo, which was implemented across all of the NFL's properties and painted on fields during the season. The numbering of the 50-yard line on fields was colored gold, and beginning on Week 7, all sideline jackets and hats featured gold-trimmed logos. Gold footballs were given to the high schools of players and coaches that had participated in a Super Bowl, and "homecoming" events were also held by Super Bowl-winning teams at games.

Ten themed "50" statues were placed in locations across San Francisco to promote the game; however, due to the negativity towards the game by residents of the city, the statues notably became the target of vandals, with the "SUPER BOWL 50" lettering on their bases re-arranged to form other phrases such as "SUPERB OWL", "SUP BRO 50", and after the Alamo Square statue was toppled, "OOPS".

==== Super Bowl week events ====
The annual NFL Experience was held at the Moscone Center in San Francisco. In addition, "Super Bowl City" opened on January 30 at Justin Herman Plaza on The Embarcadero, which featured exhibits showcasing the culture of the Bay Area. More than a million people were expected to attend the festivities in San Francisco during Super Bowl week. San Francisco mayor Ed Lee said of the highly visible homeless presence in this area "they are going to have to leave". San Francisco city supervisor Jane Kim unsuccessfully lobbied for the NFL to reimburse San Francisco for city services in the amount of $5 million.

Organizers announced plans for $2 million worth of other ancillary events, including a week-long event at the Santa Clara Convention Center, a beer, wine and food festival at Bellomy Field at Santa Clara University, and a pep rally. The city council announced plans to set aside seed funding for the event. For the first time, the Super Bowl 50 Host Committee and the NFL openly sought businesses owned by the LGBT community and disabled veterans for Business Connect, a program that provides local companies with contracting opportunities in and around the Super Bowl.

The game's media day—which was typically held on the Tuesday afternoon prior to the game—was retooled as an entertainment-oriented event known as Super Bowl Opening Night. Held on February 1, 2016, at the SAP Center in San Jose, the new format featured an opening ceremony and player introductions attended by 7,000 fans, followed by the traditional media availabilities.

==== Philanthropy ====
The Super Bowl 50 Host Committee vowed to be "the most giving Super Bowl ever", and dedicated 25 percent of all money it raised for philanthropic causes in the Bay Area. The committee created the 50 fund as its philanthropic initiative and focuses on providing grants to aid with youth development, community investment and sustainable environments.

==== Trophy ====
In addition to the Vince Lombardi Trophy that all Super Bowl champions receive, the Broncos also received a large, 18-karat gold-plated "50". Each digit weighs 33 lb (15 kg) for a total of 66 lb (30 kg). Like the Lombardi Trophy, the "50" was designed by Tiffany & Co.

==== Volunteers ====
After putting out a call for volunteers in June 2015, over 450 volunteers helped to make the Super Bowl 50 Tour happen. More than 5,000 volunteers were on hand to help with events leading up to, during and after Super Bowl 50 as well. Volunteers signed up for a minimum of 3–4 hour shifts, and some volunteers gave more than 200 hours of their time over the course of the week. As a thank you for volunteering, volunteers were gifted backpacks and uniforms.

== Broadcasting ==
=== Television ===
==== United States ====
In the United States, the game was televised by CBS as part of a cycle between the three main broadcast television partners of the NFL. CBS's lead broadcast team of Jim Nantz and Phil Simms called the contest, with Tracy Wolfson and Evan Washburn on the sidelines. This would prove to be the last Super Bowl that Phil Simms called as color commentator; after the following season, he was replaced in the booth by Tony Romo and moved to The NFL Today where he remained until leaving CBS in 2024.

CBS introduced new features during the telecast, including pylon cameras and microphones, and Intel freeD instant replay technology (branded on-air as EyeVision 360, as a successor to a previous "EyeVision" employed at Super Bowl XXXV)—using an array of 36 5K resolution cameras along the upper deck that were used to provide 360-degree views of plays and "bullet time" effects, and the debut of a major re-branding of the CBS Sports division, including a new logo and on-air graphics.

On December 28, 2015, ESPN announced that they had reached an agreement with CBS and the NFL to provide a dedicated Spanish-language broadcast of Super Bowl 50, airing on ESPN Deportes and streaming on WatchESPN, featuring commentary and surrounding coverage in the language; unlike Fox and NBC, CBS does not have a Spanish-language cable network that could have carried such a broadcast. The production utilized CBS's video, but with Spanish-language graphics provided by ESPN, and its Monday Night Football commentary crew of Alvaro Martin, Raul Allegre, and sideline reporter John Sutcliffe. ESPN Deportes broadcast pre-game and post-game coverage, while Martin, Allegre, and Sutcliffe also contributed reports for the English-language ESPN as part of efforts to promote the simulcast. ESPN Deportes' vice president of programming Freddy Rolon felt that dedicated Spanish-language coverage appealed better to Hispanic viewers than Spanish commentary on the SAP audio channel, going on to say that "I have family members who watch Spanish language television and they don't know where that SAP button is to begin with".

As opposed to broadcasts of primetime series, CBS broadcast special episodes of its late-night talk shows as its lead-out programs for Super Bowl 50, beginning with a special live episode of The Late Show with Stephen Colbert following the game, with a sketch featuring a pre-recorded appearance by Barack Obama, and guests Will Ferrell, Tina Fey, Margot Robbie, and Megyn Kelly. Following a break for late local programming, CBS also aired a special episode of The Late Late Show with James Corden.

With an average television audience of 111.9 million, the game was the third most-watched Super Bowl—and third most-watched U.S. program—in history, according to the Nielsen ratings. It was also the most-watched program of all time in terms of total audience, 167-million, which measures those who viewed at least six minutes of the broadcast. Average viewership is the industry standard for determining television ratings, while total audience is a supplemental metric. The Spanish-language broadcast on ESPN Deportes was seen by an average of 472,000 viewers; it ranked behind Super Bowl XLVIII as the second-most-watched Spanish-language cable telecast in U.S. history, outside of soccer games.

===== Advertising =====
CBS set the base rate for a 30-second advertisement at $5 million, a record high price for a Super Bowl ad. As of January 26, the advertisements had not yet sold out. CBS mandated that all advertisers purchase a package covering time on both the television and digital broadcasts of the game, meaning that for the first time, digital streams of the game would carry all national advertising in pattern with the television broadcast. This would be the final year in a multi-year contract with Anheuser-Busch InBev that allowed the beer manufacturer to air multiple advertisements during the game at a steep discount. It was also the final year that Doritos, a longtime sponsor of the game, held its "Crash the Super Bowl" contest that allowed viewers to create their own Doritos ads for a chance to have it aired during the game. Nintendo and The Pokémon Company also made their Super Bowl debut, Hyundai placed in both first and fifth place respectively on USA Today's Super Bowl Ad Meter survey, with their ads "First Date" (for the Hyundai Genesis) and "Ryanville" (for the 2017 Hyundai Elantra).

First-time advertisers at Super Bowl 50 included Amazon.com, Colgate toothpaste, Death Wish Coffee (who beat 10 other small businesses in a contest held by Intuit, who paid for the ad time as a prize), LG Electronics, Marmot, Nintendo (promoting the 20th anniversary of the Pokémon franchise), PayPal, and SoFi.

20th Century Fox, Lionsgate, Paramount Pictures, Universal Studios and Walt Disney Studios paid for movie trailers to be aired during the Super Bowl. Fox paid for Deadpool, X-Men: Apocalypse, Independence Day: Resurgence and Eddie the Eagle, Lionsgate paid for Gods of Egypt, Paramount paid for Teenage Mutant Ninja Turtles: Out of the Shadows and 10 Cloverfield Lane, Universal paid for The Secret Life of Pets and the debut trailer for Jason Bourne and Disney paid for Captain America: Civil War, The Jungle Book, and Alice Through the Looking Glass.

==== International ====
	Rights holder(s)
Austria	The event was aired live on Puls 4, Sat.1 and on live stream. Commentary of Puls 4 and Sat.1, who are owned by the same company, is different, but both are German speaking.
Australia	The event aired live on the Seven Network and 7mate, alongside subscription channel ESPN
Brazil	In Brazil the event aired live on Free-to-air television at Esporte Interativo and on paid television at ESPN Brasil at 9:00 PM.
Canada	CTV continues to hold rights to the Super Bowl under a long-term contract. CTV aired a new episode of DC's Legends of Tomorrow, "White Knights", as a lead-out program, prior to its premiere on The CW in the United States the following Thursday. CTV Go offered digital streaming of the game to authenticated pay television subscribers on participating providers.
Czech Republic	The event aired live on paid television station, Sport 2.
Denmark	In Denmark the event aired live on paid television station TV3+. The rights to the event is owned by Viasat until 2017.
France; Switzerland	France and Switzerland (French speaking), aired the event live on W9.
Germany; Switzerland	Germany, Switzerland (German speaking) aired the event live on Sat.1 and on live stream.
Japan	The event aired live on NHK BS1 and Nittele G+.
Netherlands	The event aired live on the pay television station Fox Sports 2. and also broadcast live on national television by FOX HD.
New Zealand	ESPN was broadcast live on Sky Channel 60 (CBS feed), TVNZ aired the event live on TV One, TVNZ Pop-Up (Freeview 13), and streamed it live on TVNZ OnDemand (international feed).
Philippines	The event aired live on TV5 and Hyper (Channel 53 (SD)/Channel 130 (HD) on Cignal) via live feed from All Sports Network at 7:00 am Philippine Standard Time, with same day rebroadcast at 7:00 pm only on Hyper. TV5 programming aired during the morning hours have been pre-empted due to the live telecast and aired the following day.
Poland	The event aired live on Eleven Sports (Channel 128 (HD) on NC+) via the international feed with local commentary at midnight local time.
Romania	The event aired live on Dolce Sport at 1:00 AM Eastern European Time, with same day rebroadcast at 6:30 PM.
Thailand	TrueVisions aired it live on True4U Channel 24 and Truesport HD at 6:00 AM Time in Thailand.
United Kingdom; Ireland	The event aired live in the UK and Ireland on BBC Two (International feed) and on Sky Sports (CBS feed). The BBC secured a two-year deal to broadcast the Super Bowl as well as all three International Series games being held at Wembley Stadium in London, England, having previously lost the rights to public-service broadcaster Channel 4 in 2013.

=== Streaming ===
CBS provided digital streams of the game via CBSSports.com, and the CBS Sports apps on tablets, Windows 10, Xbox One and other digital media players (such as Chromecast and Roku). Due to Verizon Communications' exclusive mobile rights to the NFL, streaming on smartphones was only provided to Verizon Wireless customers via the NFL Mobile service.

Although CBS had launched its own over-the-top streaming service, CBS All Access, in October 2014, it would not be until December 2016 that the NFL would start to allow CBS game broadcasts to be streamed on that site.

=== Radio ===
==== National coverage ====
Westwood One carried the game throughout North America, with Kevin Harlan as play-by-play announcer, Boomer Esiason and Dan Fouts as color analysts, and James Lofton and Mark Malone as sideline reporters. Jim Gray anchored the pre-game and halftime coverage.

==== Local market coverage ====
The flagship stations of each station in the markets of each team carried their local play-by-play calls. In Denver, KOA (850 AM) and KRFX (103.5 FM) carried the game, with Dave Logan on play-by-play and Ed McCaffrey on color commentary. In North Carolina, WBT (1110 AM) carried the game, with Mick Mixon on play-by-play and Eugene Robinson and Jim Szoke on color commentary. WBT also simulcast the game on its sister station WBT-FM (99.3 FM), based in Chester, South Carolina. As KOA and WBT are both clear-channel stations, the local broadcasts were audible over much of the western United States after sunset (for Denver) and the eastern United States throughout the game (for Carolina). In accordance with contractual rules, the rest of the stations in the Broncos and Panthers radio networks either carried the Westwood One feed or did not air the game at all.

==== International broadcasts ====
In the United Kingdom, BBC Radio 5 Live and 5 Live Sports Extra carried the contest. As in previous years, the BBC aired its own commercial-free British English broadcast, with Greg Brady, Darren Fletcher and Rocky Boiman on commentary. The game was broadcast live in India on Sony SIX.

== Entertainment ==
=== Pre-game ===
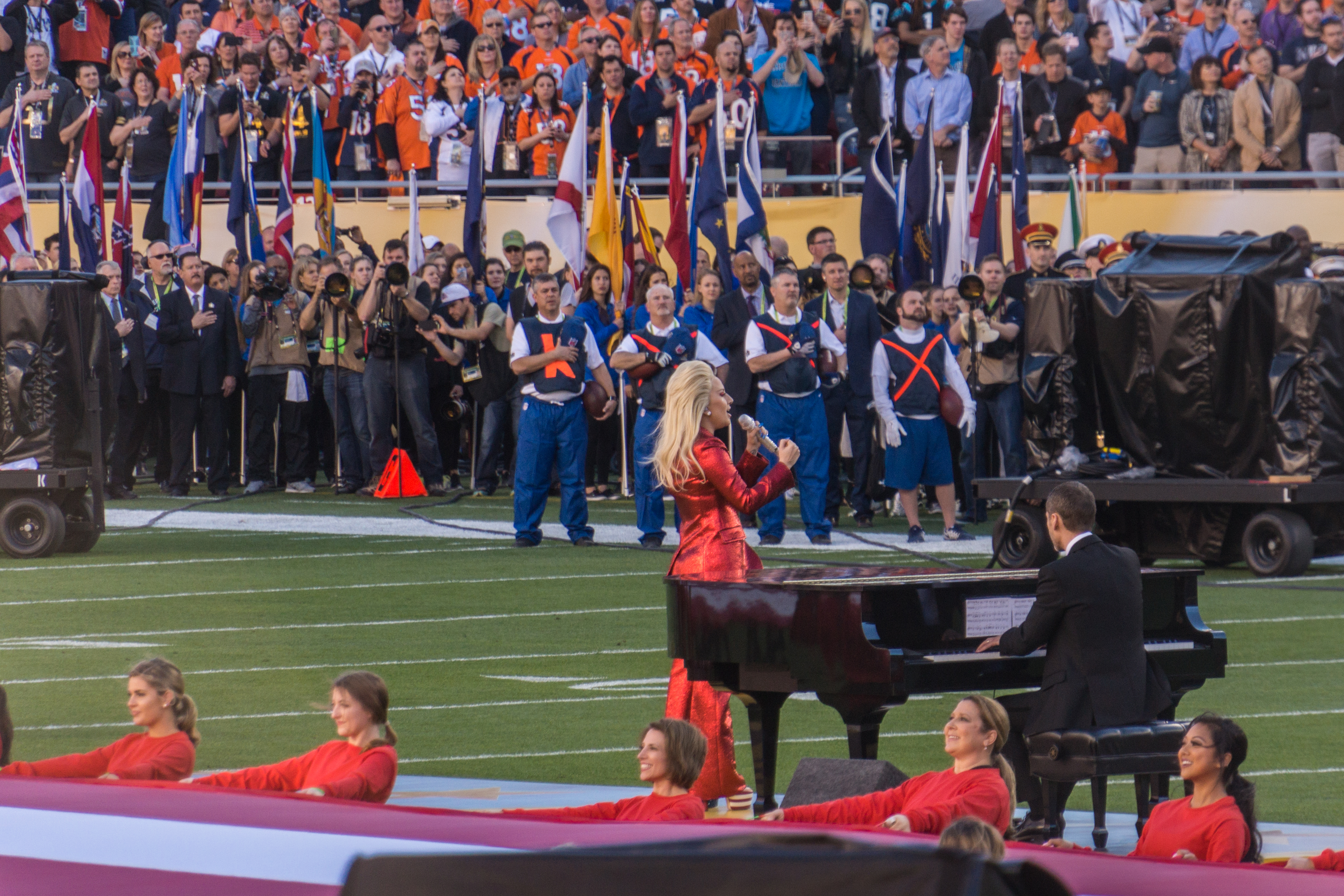
Lady Gaga singing the national anthem

In honor of the 50th Super Bowl, the pregame ceremony featured the on-field introduction of 39 of the 43 previous Super Bowl Most Valuable Players. Bart Starr (MVP of Super Bowls I and II) and Chuck Howley (MVP of Super Bowl V) appeared via video. Harvey Martin, co-MVP of Super Bowl XII who died in 2001, was acknowledged when the other co-MVP of Super Bowl XII, Randy White, was introduced. Peyton Manning (MVP of Super Bowl XLI and the Broncos' starting quarterback for the game) was shown in the locker room preparing for the game. This ceremony continued a ten-year tradition (starting with Super Bowl XX and then repeated in Super Bowl XXX and Super Bowl XL) in which past Super Bowl MVPs were honored before the game.

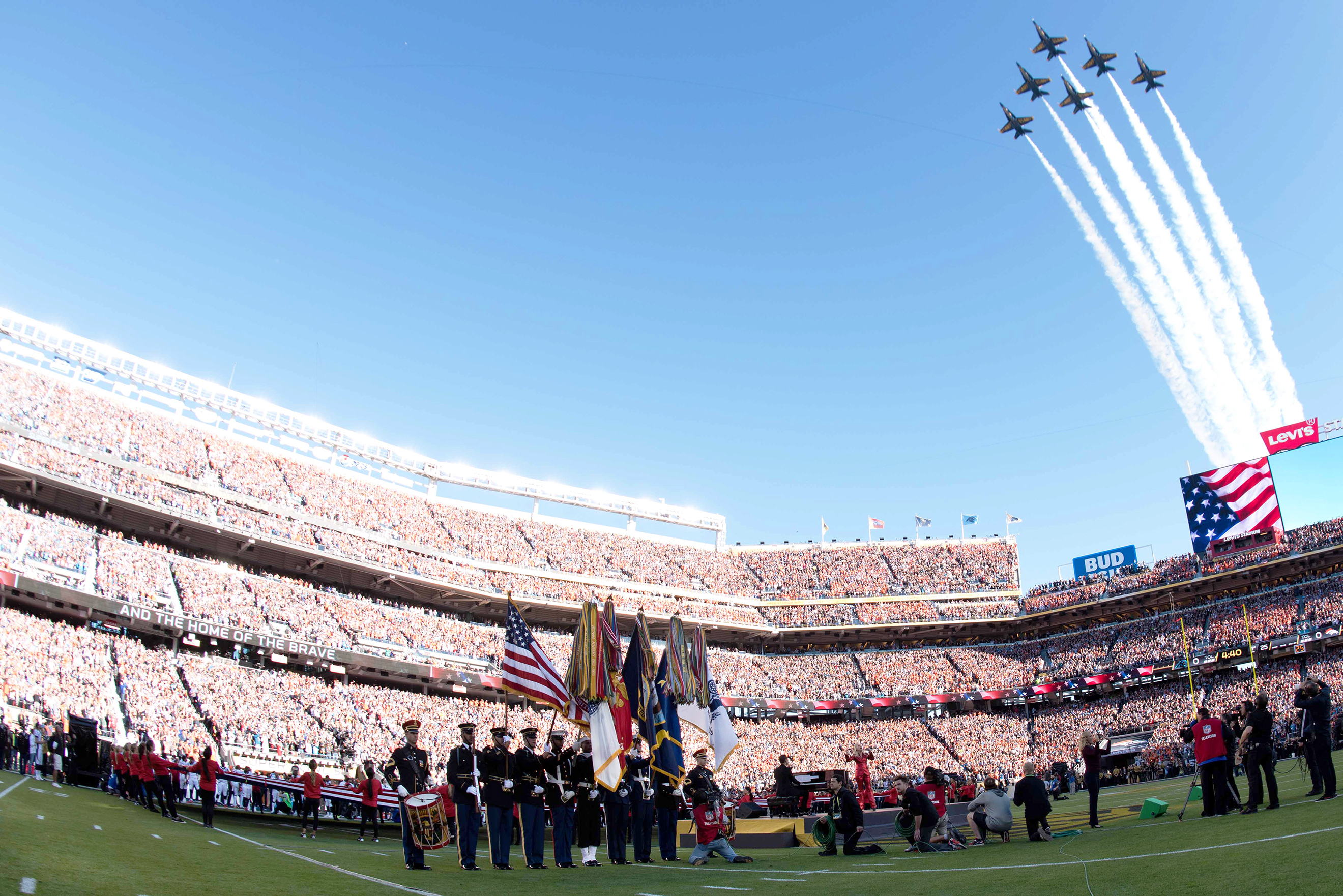
The Navy's Blue Angels fly over Levi's Stadium, Santa Clara, Calif. (U.S. Army Photo by Spc. Brandon C. Dyer)

Lady Gaga (accompanied by Alex Smith on piano) sang the national anthem, while Marlee Matlin simultaneously performed an American Sign Language (ASL) version of it. Matlin also signed an a cappella version of "America the Beautiful", which was sung by a U.S. Armed Forces chorus. The anthem concluded with a flyover by the U.S. Navy Blue Angels demonstration squadron flying the F/A-18C Hornet.

=== Halftime show ===
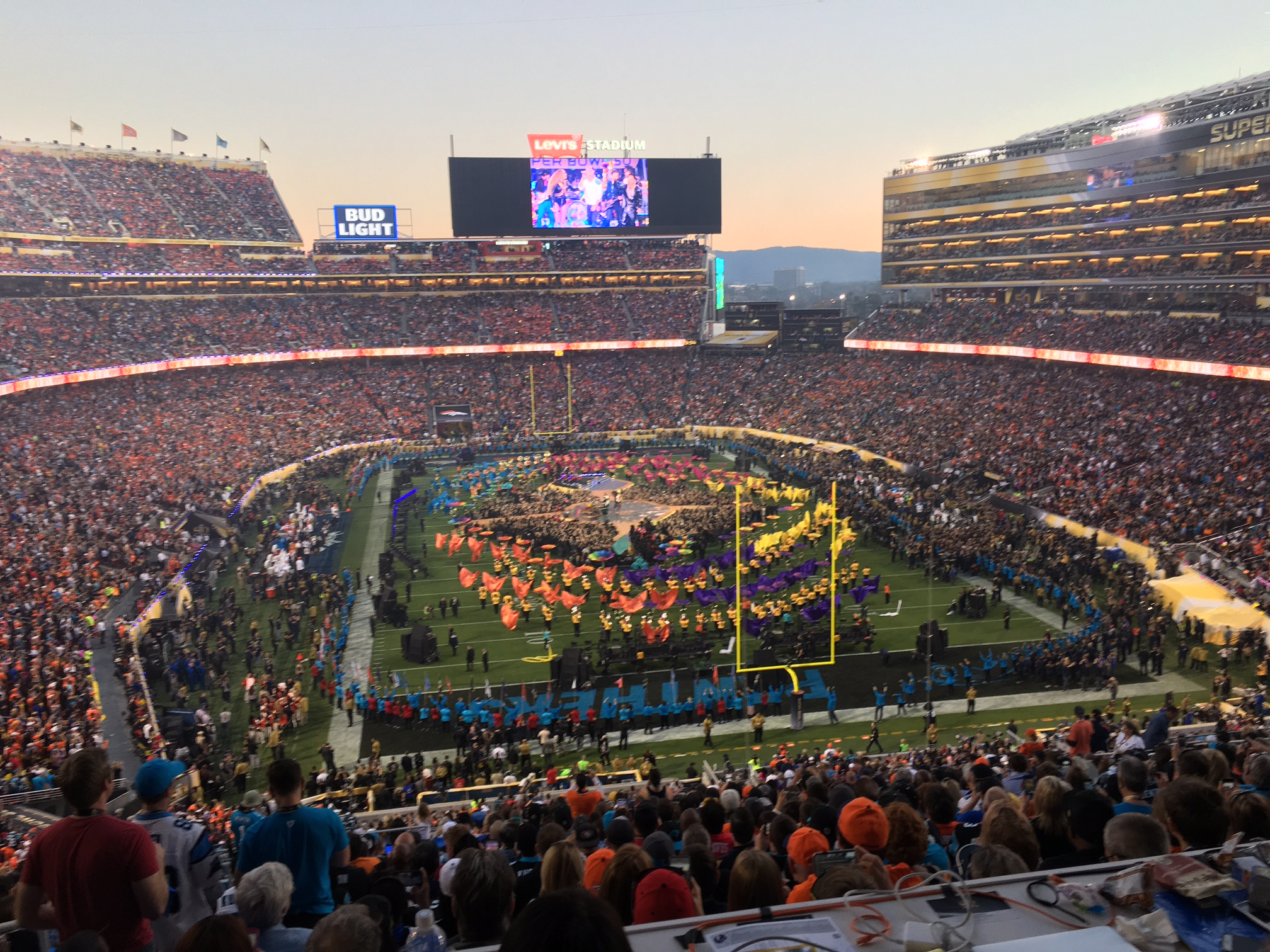
Super Bowl 50 halftime show

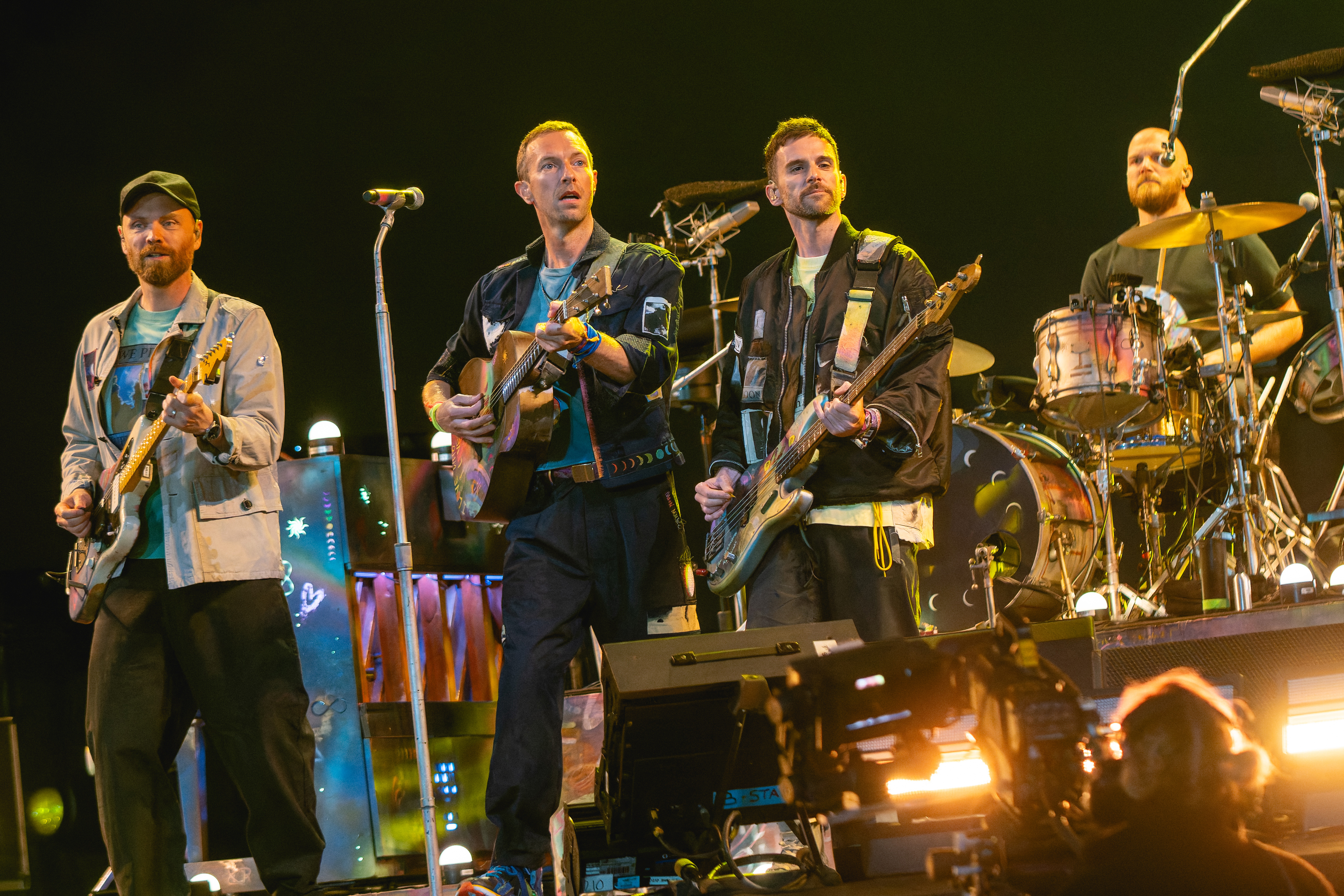
Coldplay headlined the halftime show

In late November 2015, reports surfaced stating that "multiple acts" would perform during the halftime show. On December 3, the league confirmed that the show would be headlined by the British rock band Coldplay. On January 7, 2016, Pepsi confirmed to the Associated Press that Beyoncé, who headlined the Super Bowl XLVII halftime show and collaborated with Coldplay on the single "Hymn for the Weekend" (which was removed from the setlist before the game), would be making an appearance. Bruno Mars, who headlined the Super Bowl XLVIII halftime show, and Mark Ronson (Mars's collaborator on "Uptown Funk") also performed.

== Game summary ==
External videos
- Full game broadcast on CBS on YouTube

=== First half ===
Denver took the opening kickoff of Super Bowl 50 and started out strong. Quarterback Peyton Manning completed an 18-yard pass to tight end Owen Daniels and a 22-yard pass to wide receiver Andre Caldwell. A pair of carries by running back C. J. Anderson moved the ball up 20 yards to the Carolina 14-yard line, but the Panthers' defense dug in over the next three plays. First, linebacker Shaq Thompson tackled running back Ronnie Hillman for a 3-yard loss. Then after an incompletion, linebacker Thomas Davis tackled Anderson for a 1-yard gain on third down, forcing the Broncos to settle for a 3–0 lead on a 34-yard field goal by kicker Brandon McManus. The score marked the first time in the entire postseason that Carolina was facing a deficit, and it would remain that way for the rest of the game.

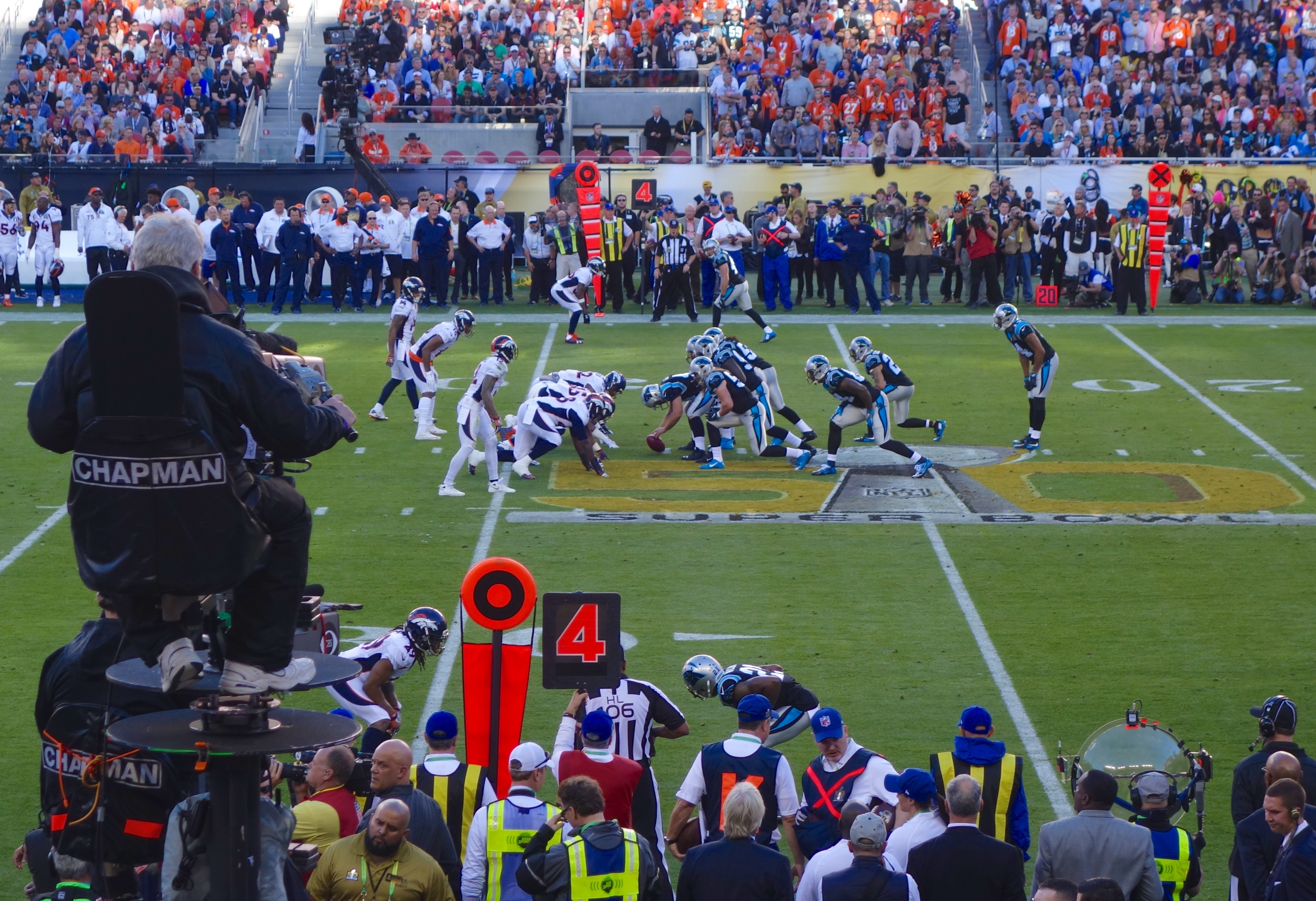
The Panthers on special teams during Super Bowl 50

After each team punted, Panthers quarterback Cam Newton appeared to complete a 24-yard pass to wide receiver Jerricho Cotchery, but the call was ruled an incompletion and upheld after a replay challenge. CBS analyst and retired referee Mike Carey stated he disagreed with the call and felt the review clearly showed the pass was complete. Two plays later, on 3rd-and-10 from the Carolina 15-yard line, linebacker Von Miller strip-sacked Newton, and defensive tackle Malik Jackson recovered the ball in the end zone for the first touchdown of the game, giving Denver a 10–0 lead. This was the first fumble return touchdown in a Super Bowl since James Washington's touchdown in Super Bowl XXVIII.

After the teams exchanged punts again, the Panthers got on the board with a 9-play, 73-yard scoring drive, which carried over into the second quarter. Newton completed all four of his pass attempts for 51 yards, including two passes to wide receiver Corey Brown for 33 yards, and rushed twice for 23 yards, while running back Jonathan Stewart finished the drive with a 1-yard touchdown run, cutting Carolina's deficit to 10–7 with 11:28 left in the half. After yet another punt exchange, Broncos wide receiver Jordan Norwood received Brad Nortman's short 28-yard punt surrounded by Panthers players, but none of them attempted to make a tackle, apparently thinking Norwood had called for a fair catch. Norwood had not done so, and with no resistance around him, he took off for a Super Bowl record 61-yard return before defensive end Mario Addison dragged him down at the Carolina 14-yard line. That record would be broken seven years later when Kadarius Toney returned a punt 65 yards in the late stages of Super Bowl LVII. Anderson then caught a 7-yard pass from Manning, then rushed for 2 yards before being stopped for no gain, bringing up 4th-and-1 at the 5-yard line. Anderson then picked up the first down, but this was nullified by a holding penalty against guard Louis Vasquez, so McManus kicked a 33-yard field goal to increase the Broncos' lead to 13–7.

On Carolina's next possession, fullback Mike Tolbert fumbled the ball while being tackled by safety Darian Stewart, with linebacker Danny Trevathan making the recovery on the Denver 40-yard line. However, three plays after Anderson burst through the line for a 34-yard gain to reach the Carolina 26, the Panthers took the ball back when defensive end Kony Ealy intercepted Manning, returning the ball 19 yards to his own 39-yard line with 4:23 left in the half. After another exchange of punts, Carolina reached the Denver 45-yard line, but with 11 seconds left and no timeouts, Newton was sacked by linebacker DeMarcus Ware to end the first half.

=== Second half ===
The Panthers seemed primed to score on their opening drive of the second half when Newton completed a 45-yard pass to wide receiver Ted Ginn Jr., which was the longest pass play of the game for either team, to reach the Denver 35-yard line on their second offensive play. However, the Broncos' defense halted the drive on the 26-yard line, and it ended with no points when kicker Graham Gano hit the right upright on a 44-yard field goal attempt. After the miss, Manning completed a pair of passes to wide receiver Emmanuel Sanders for gains of 25 and 22 yards, setting up McManus's 33-yard field goal that increased the Broncos' lead to 16–7. Carolina got off to another strong start after the kickoff, with Newton completing a 42-yard pass to Brown. But once again they came up empty, this time as a result of a Newton pass that bounced off the hands of Ginn and was intercepted by safety T. J. Ward. Ward fumbled the ball while being tackled by Tolbert during the return, but Trevathan was able to recover the ball enabling Denver to keep possession.

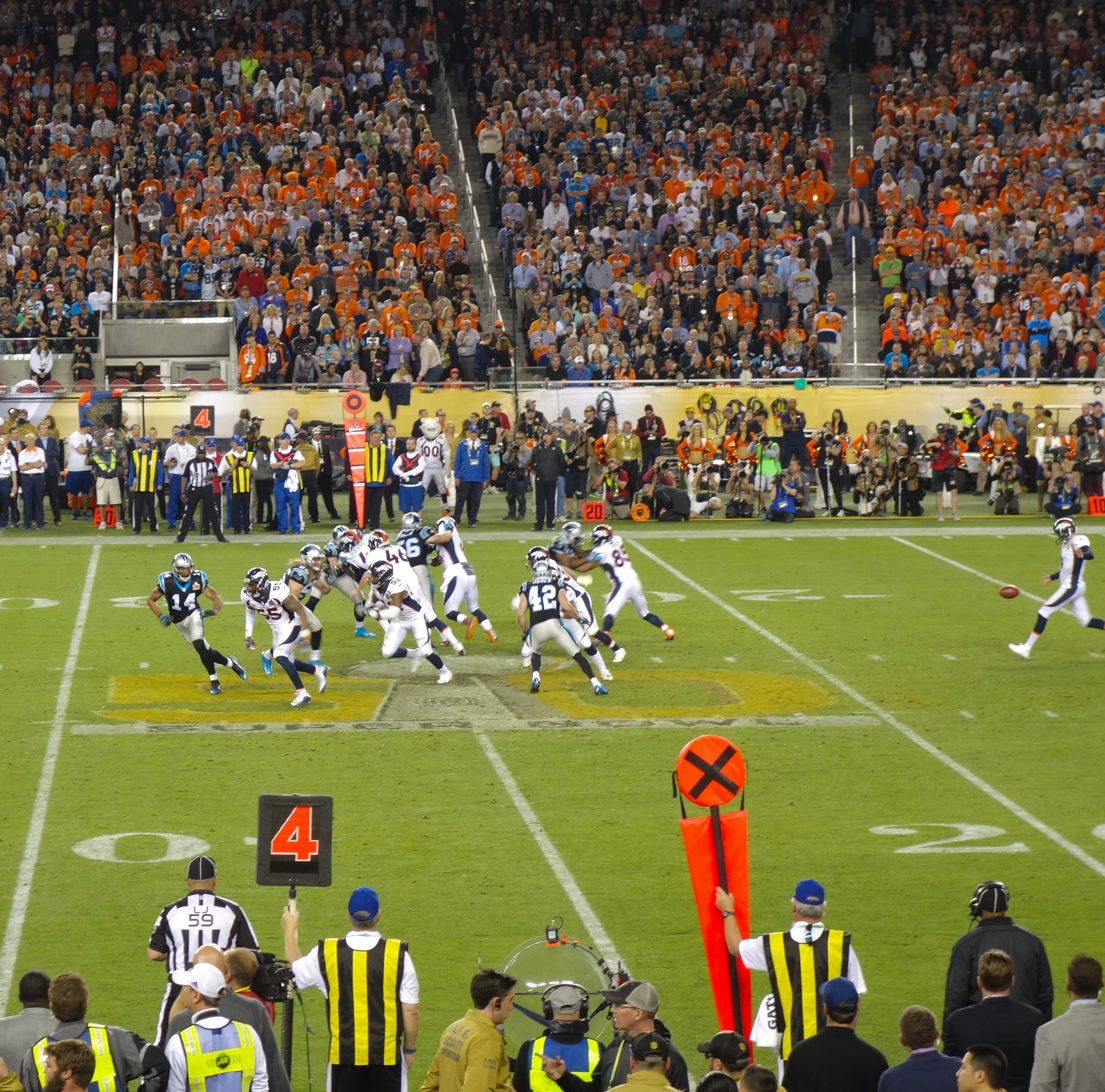
The last punt of Super Bowl 50

The teams exchanged punts again shortly before the end of the third quarter, but early in the fourth, the Broncos drove to the Carolina 41-yard line. On the next play, Ealy knocked the ball out of Manning's hand as he was winding up for a pass, and recovered it for Carolina at midfield. A 16-yard reception by wide receiver Devin Funchess and a 12-yard run by Stewart then set up Gano's 39-yard field goal, cutting the Panthers' deficit to one score at 16–10. The next three drives of the game would end in punts.

With 4:51 left in regulation, the Panthers got the ball on their own 24-yard line with a chance to mount a game-winning drive, but they soon faced 3rd-and-9. On the next play, Miller strip-sacked Newton for the second time in the game, and after several players dove for the ball, it took a long bounce backwards and was recovered by Ward, who returned it 5 yards to the Carolina 4-yard line, setting up 1st-and-goal for the Broncos. Newton was the third player to attempt a recovery (following Ware and offensive tackle Mike Remmers) of the ball and while various angles appeared to show that he had a decent probability of recovery if he had dived in his attempt, Newton instead hesitated and then tried to drop on top of the ball, which failed. This split-second decision later earned him criticism. Meanwhile, Denver's offense was kept out of the end zone for three plays, but a holding penalty against cornerback Josh Norman gave the Broncos a new set of downs. Then Anderson scored on a 2-yard touchdown run and Manning completed a pass to wide receiver Bennie Fowler for a two-point conversion, giving the Broncos a 24–10 lead with 3:08 left and essentially putting the game away. The two-point conversion marked the final pass of Manning's career and also the first scoring catch of Fowler's career. Carolina had two more drives and managed one first down before the game ended.

=== Post-game ===
This was the Broncos' third Super Bowl championship, and first since Super Bowl XXXIII. Upon receiving the Lombardi Trophy, Broncos general manager and former quarterback John Elway held it in the air and exclaimed "this one's for Pat!" in reference to owner Pat Bowlen, who had been diagnosed the year before with Alzheimer's disease. Bowlen had saluted Elway in the same fashion by saying "this one's for John!" after the Broncos won their first Super Bowl championship in Super Bowl XXXII eighteen years earlier.

Manning finished the game 13 of 23 for 141 yards with one interception, two fumbles, and was sacked five times. He became the oldest quarterback ever to win a Super Bowl at age 39, the first quarterback ever to win a Super Bowl starting for two teams, and the first quarterback ever to win 200 games (regular season and postseason) as a starter. Sanders was his top receiver with six receptions for 83 yards. Anderson was the game's leading rusher with 90 yards and a touchdown, along with four receptions for 10 yards. Miller had six total tackles (five solo), 2 1/2 sacks, and two forced fumbles. Ware had five total tackles and two sacks. Ward had seven total tackles, a fumble recovery, and an interception. McManus made all three of his field goals, making him perfect on all 10 attempts during the post-season. Broncos coach Gary Kubiak became the first head coach to win a Super Bowl with the same franchise he went to the Super Bowl with as a player.

Newton completed 18 of 41 passes for 265 yards with one interception, two fumbles, and was sacked seven times. He was also his team's leading rusher with 45 yards on six carries. Brown caught four passes for 80 yards, while Ginn had four receptions for 74 yards. Ginn was sacked once on a trick play. Ealy was the top defensive performer for Carolina with four total tackles, three sacks, a forced fumble, a fumble recovery, and an interception. Defensive end Charles Johnson had four total tackles, a sack, and a forced fumble. Linebacker Luke Kuechly had 11 total tackles and a sack, while Thomas Davis had seven total tackles, despite playing just two weeks after breaking his right arm in the NFC Championship.

Super Bowl 50 featured numerous records from individuals and the two teams. Denver won despite being massively outgained in total yards (315–194) and first downs (21–11). Their 194 yards and 11 first downs were both the lowest totals ever by a Super Bowl winning team, as the previous record was 244 yards by the Baltimore Ravens in Super Bowl XXXV. Only seven other teams had ever gained fewer than 200 yards in a Super Bowl, and all of them had lost. The Broncos' seven sacks tied a Super Bowl record set by the Chicago Bears in Super Bowl XX. Manning was sacked five times by the Panthers, giving this game highest total (12) of combined sacks in Super Bowl history. Kony Ealy tied a Super Bowl record with three sacks, and is the only such player to do so and record an interception. Jordan Norwood's 61-yard punt return set a new record, surpassing the old record of 45 yards set by John Taylor in Super Bowl XXIII. Denver was just 1-of-14 on third down, while Carolina was 3-of-15. The two teams' combined third down conversion percentage of 13.8 was the lowest in Super Bowl history. Manning and Newton had quarterback passer ratings of 56.6 and 55.4, respectively, and their added total of 112 is a record lowest aggregate passer rating for a Super Bowl.

=== Box score ===
Super Bowl 50: Carolina Panthers vs. Denver Broncos

Quarter	1	2	3	4	Total
Panthers (NFC)	0	7	0	3	10
Broncos (AFC)	10	3	3	8	24

at Levi's Stadium in Santa Clara, California

- Date: February 7
- Game time: 3:39 p.m. PST
- Game weather: Sunny, 76 °F (24 °C)
- Game attendance: 71,088
- Referee: Clete Blakeman
- TV announcers (CBS): Jim Nantz, Phil Simms, Tracy Wolfson and Evan Washburn
- Recap, Game Book

Scoring summary

Quarter	Time	Drive			Team	Scoring information	Score	
Quarter	Time	Plays	Yards	TOP	Team	Scoring information	CAR	DEN
1	10:43	10	64	4:17	DEN	34-yard field goal by Brandon McManus	0	3
1	6:27	—	—	—	DEN	Fumble recovery returned 0 yards for touchdown by Malik Jackson, McManus kick good	0	10
2	11:25	9	73	4:50	CAR	Jonathan Stewart 1-yard touchdown run, Graham Gano kick good	7	10
2	6:58	4	−1	2:13	DEN	33-yard field goal by McManus	7	13
3	8:18	7	54	2:30	DEN	30-yard field goal by McManus	7	16
4	10:21	6	29	2:56	CAR	39-yard field goal by Gano	10	16
4	3:08	3	4	0:56	DEN	C. J. Anderson 2-yard touchdown run, 2-point pass good (Peyton Manning to Bennie Fowler)	10	24
"TOP" = time of possession. For other American football terms, see Glossary of American football.							10	24

== Final statistics ==
=== Statistical comparison ===
Statistic	Carolina Panthers	Denver Broncos
First downs	21	11
First downs rushing	8	4
First downs passing	10	5
First downs penalty	3	2
Third down efficiency	3/15	1/14
Fourth down efficiency	0/0	0/0
Total net yards	315	194
Net yards rushing	118	90
Rushing attempts	27	28
Yards per rush	4.4	3.2
Net yards passing	197	104
Passing – completions/attempts	18/41	13/23
Times sacked-total yards	7–68	5–37
Interceptions thrown	1	1
Punt returns-total yards	3–2	1–61
Kickoff returns-total yards	2–42	2–42
Interceptions-total return yards	1–19	1–(−3)
Punts-average yardage	7–45.0	8–45.9
Fumbles-lost	4–3	3–1
Penalties-yards	12–102	6–51
Time of possession	32:47	27:13
Turnovers	4	2

Records set
Oldest quarterback to start game	39 years, 320 days	Peyton Manning (Denver)
Oldest quarterback to win game	39 years, 320 days	Peyton Manning (Denver)
Longest punt return	61 yards	Jordan Norwood (Denver)
Most times sacked, both teams	12	Carolina 7, Denver 5
Fewest total yards, winning team	194	Denver
Records tied
Most sacks, player, game	3	Kony Ealy (Carolina)
Most fumble recoveries, player, game	2	Danny Trevathan (Denver)
Most touchdowns, fumble recoveries, player, game	1	Malik Jackson (Denver)
Most 2-point conversions, player	1	Bennie Fowler (Denver)
Most games played, team	8	Denver
Fewest (1-pt.) points after touchdown, both teams	2	Carolina 1, Denver 1

=== Individual statistics ===
Panthers passing
	C/ATT^{1}	Yds	TD	INT	Rating
Cam Newton	18/41	265	0	1	55.4
Panthers rushing
	Car^{2}	Yds	TD	LG^{3}	Yds/Car
Cam Newton	6	45	0	14	7.4
Jonathan Stewart	12	29	1	12	2.4
Fozzy Whittaker	4	26	0	15	6.5
Mike Tolbert	5	18	0	11	3.6
Panthers receiving
	Rec^{4}	Yds	TD	LG^{3}	Target^{5}
Corey Brown	4	80	0	42	7
Ted Ginn Jr.	4	74	0	45	10
Greg Olsen	4	41	0	19	9
Devin Funchess	2	40	0	24	5
Jerricho Cotchery	2	17	0	11	5
Fozzy Whittaker	1	14	0	14	1
Jonathan Stewart	1	−1	0	−1	2
Mike Tolbert	0	0	0	0	1

Broncos passing
	C/ATT^{1}	Yds	TD	INT	Rating
Peyton Manning	13/23	141	0	1	56.6
Broncos rushing
	Car^{2}	Yds	TD	LG^{3}	Yds/Car
C. J. Anderson	23	90	1	34	3.9
Ronnie Hillman	5	0	0	3	0.0
Broncos receiving
	Rec^{4}	Yds	TD	LG^{3}	Target^{5}
Emmanuel Sanders	6	83	0	25	8
C. J. Anderson	4	10	0	7	4
Andre Caldwell	1	22	0	22	1
Owen Daniels	1	18	0	18	2
Demaryius Thomas	1	8	0	8	6
Ronnie Hillman	0	0	0	0	1
Jordan Norwood	0	0	0	0	1

^{1}Completions/attempts ^{2}Carries ^{3}Longest gain ^{4}Receptions ^{5}Times targeted

== Starting lineups ==
Hall of Fame‡

Carolina	Position		Denver
Offense
Ted Ginn Jr.	WR		Demaryius Thomas
Michael Oher	LT		Ryan Harris
Andrew Norwell	LG		Evan Mathis
Ryan Kalil	C		Matt Paradis
Trai Turner	RG		Louis Vasquez
Mike Remmers	RT		Michael Schofield
Greg Olsen	TE		Owen Daniels
Corey Brown	WR		Emmanuel Sanders
Cam Newton	QB		Peyton Manning‡
Jonathan Stewart	RB		C. J. Anderson
Ed Dickson	TE		Vernon Davis
Defense
Charles Johnson	LDE	DE	Derek Wolfe
Star Lotulelei	LDT	NT	Sylvester Williams
Kawann Short	RDT	DE	Malik Jackson
Jared Allen‡	RDE	SLB	Von Miller
Shaq Thompson	SLB	WLB	DeMarcus Ware‡
Luke Kuechly‡	MLB	ILB	Brandon Marshall
Thomas Davis	WLB	ILB	Danny Trevathan
Robert McClain	LCB		Aqib Talib
Josh Norman	RCB		Chris Harris Jr.
Roman Harper	SS		T. J. Ward
Kurt Coleman	FS		Darian Stewart

== Officials ==
Super Bowl 50 had nine officials. The numbers in parentheses below indicate their uniform numbers.

- Referee: Clete Blakeman (34)
- Umpire: Jeff Rice (44)
- Head linesman: Wayne Mackie (106)
- Line judge: Rusty Baynes (59)
- Field judge: Boris Cheek (41)
- Side judge: Scott Edwards (3)
- Back judge: Keith Ferguson (61)
- Replay official: Charles Stewart
- Replay assistant: Jimmy Oldham

== Aftermath ==
Broncos quarterback Peyton Manning would announce his retirement from the NFL a month after the Super Bowl. This was also the final game in the career of Panthers defensive lineman Jared Allen, who retired as the NFL's ninth all-time leader in sacks.

The next season began a Super Bowl 50 rematch, with the Broncos hosting the Panthers at Sports Authority Field at Mile High. It was the first meeting of both reigning Super Bowl participants during Week 1 of the following season since 1970. The Broncos won 21–20 as Carolina's Graham Gano missed a field goal attempt to win the game. Both teams would ultimately struggle during the season and failed to qualify for the playoffs. This was the first time the defending AFC and NFC champions would both miss the playoffs since the 2003 season, and the fifth time overall. Super Bowl 50 also marked the last playoff game played by the Broncos until the 2024–25 NFL playoffs, marking the longest playoff drought following a Super Bowl victory in NFL history.
