= 2015 Carolina Panthers season =

NFL team season record

- Owner: Jerry Richardson
- General manager: Dave Gettleman
- Head coach: Ron Rivera
- Offensive coordinator: Mike Shula
- Defensive coordinator: Sean McDermott
- Home stadium: Bank of America Stadium

Results
- Record: 15–1
- Division place: 1st NFC South
- Playoffs: Won Divisional Playoffs (vs. Seahawks) 31–24; Won NFC Championship (vs. Cardinals) 49–15; Lost Super Bowl 50 (vs. Broncos) 10–24
- All-Pros: 8: QB Cam Newton (1st team); FB Mike Tolbert (1st team); C Ryan Kalil (1st team); OLB Thomas Davis (1st team); ILB Luke Kuechly (1st team); CB Josh Norman (1st team); TE Greg Olsen (2nd team); DT Kawann Short (2nd team)
- Pro Bowlers: 10: Selected but did not participate due to participation in Super Bowl 50: QB Cam Newton; RB Jonathan Stewart; FB Mike Tolbert; TE Greg Olsen; G Trai Turner; C Ryan Kalil; DT Kawann Short; OLB Thomas Davis; ILB Luke Kuechly; CB Josh Norman

Uniform
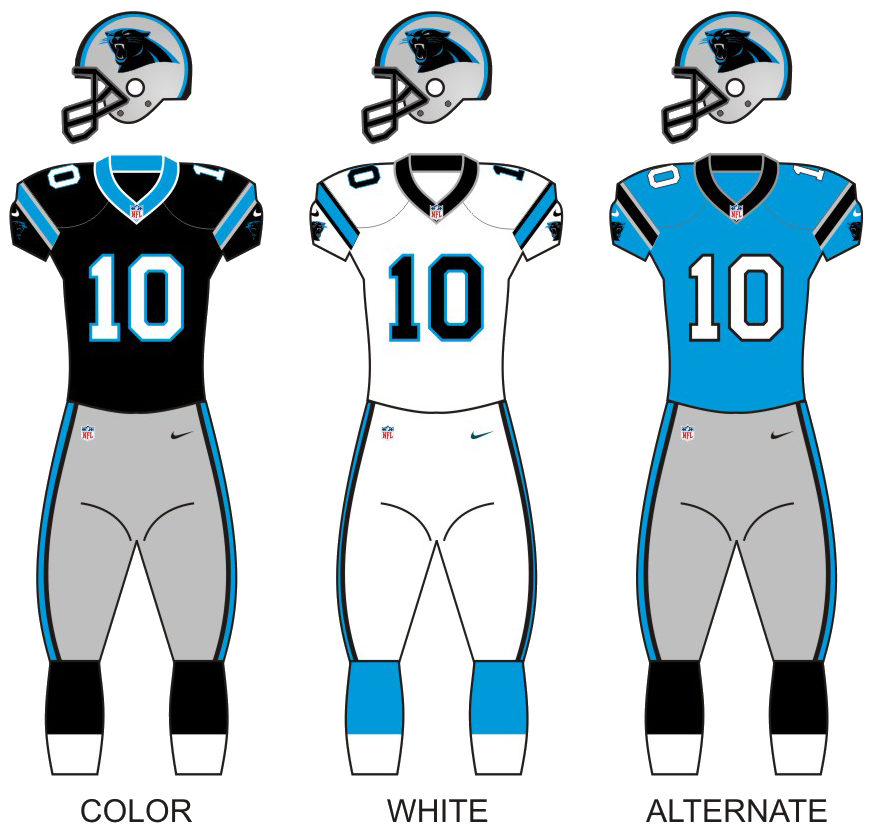

The 2015 season was the Carolina Panthers' 21st in the National Football League (NFL) and their fifth under head coach Ron Rivera. This season marked the first time in team history they played on Thanksgiving. The Panthers had their best single-season turnaround in team history, going from 7–8–1 to 15–1.

Despite waiving longtime running back and franchise rushing leader DeAngelo Williams and losing top wide receiver Kelvin Benjamin to a torn ACL in the preseason, the Panthers had their best regular season in franchise history and one of the best regular seasons in NFL history. They finished the regular season 15–1, becoming the seventh team to win at least 15 regular season games since the league expanded to a 16-game schedule in 1978. The Panthers joined the 1984 San Francisco 49ers, 1985 Chicago Bears (for whom Rivera played as a linebacker), 1998 Minnesota Vikings, 2004 Pittsburgh Steelers, 2007 New England Patriots (who were a perfect 16–0 in the regular season) and the 2011 Green Bay Packers as the only teams to accomplish this feat. They would be the final 15-game winner before the NFL expanded to a 17 game schedule in 2021. Their 15-win record would eventually be matched by the 2024 Kansas City Chiefs and 2024 Detroit Lions.

Carolina started the season 14–0, not only setting franchise records for the best start and the longest single-season winning streak, but also posting the best start to a season by an NFC team since the NFL–AFL merger, breaking the 13–0 record previously shared with their division rival 2009 New Orleans Saints and the aforementioned 2011 Packers. They joined the 1972 Miami Dolphins, 2007 Patriots and 2009 Indianapolis Colts, all from the AFC, as the only teams to reach 14–0. Carolina clinched their third straight NFC South title on December 6, when the Atlanta Falcons lost earlier that day, becoming the first team to clinch a playoff berth that season, and giving the Panthers a home playoff game for the third consecutive year.

The Panthers' undefeated streak came to an end at the hands of the Falcons in a Week 16 rematch. A week later, however, Carolina routed the Tampa Bay Buccaneers to finish 15–1, giving the Panthers home-field advantage throughout the NFC playoffs for the first time in franchise history. The Panthers had the league's top offense, and quarterback Cam Newton was named the NFL Most Valuable Player (MVP).

In the playoffs, the Panthers defeated the Seattle Seahawks 31–24 in the divisional round, avenging their elimination at the hands of the Seahawks from the previous season. The Panthers then blew out the Arizona Cardinals in the NFC Championship game by a score of 49–15 to reach their second Super Bowl appearance in franchise history. In the NFL's title game, the Panthers lost to the Denver Broncos in Super Bowl 50 by a score of 24–10, thus becoming the fifth straight team to have at least 15 victories and not win the Super Bowl.

As of 2025, this is most recent postseason win for the Panthers, having gone 0–3 (including the loss in Super Bowl 50) since. It was also the last time they clinched the NFC South until 2025.

== Draft ==
2015 Carolina Panthers draft
| Round | Pick | Player | Position | College | Notes |
| 1 | 25 | Shaq Thompson | LB | Washington | |
| 2 | 41 | Devin Funchess | WR | Michigan | |
| 4 | 102 | Daryl Williams | OT | Oklahoma | |
| 5 | 169 | David Mayo | LB | Texas St | Compensatory |
| 5 | 174 | Cameron Artis-Payne | RB | Auburn | Compensatory |
Made roster † Pro Football Hall of Fame * Made at least one Pro Bowl during career

Note: The Panthers did not have selections in the third, sixth or seventh rounds as a result of the following trades:

- Trading their second-, third- and sixth- round selections (Nos. 57, 89 and 201 overall, respectively) to the St. Louis Rams in exchange for the Rams' second-round selection (No. 41 overall);
- Trading their fourth-, fifth- and seventh-round selections (Nos. 124, 161 and 242 overall, respectively) to the Oakland Raiders in exchange for the Raiders' fourth-round selection (No. 102 overall).

== Staff ==
2015 Carolina Panthers staff
| Front office: Owner/founder – Jerry Richardson; President – Danny Morrison; general manager – Dave Gettleman; Assistant general manager – Brandon Beane; Director of team administration – Rob Rogers; Director of pro scouting – Mark Koncz; Director of college scouting – Don Gregory; National scout – Jeff Morrow; National scout – Mike Szabo; Football operations manager – Bryan Porter; Football operations assistant – Matt Allen; Football operations assistant – Mike Anderson; Director of player development – Mark Carrier; Executive assistant to the Head Coach – Linda O'Hora; Head coaches: Head coach – Ron Rivera; Assistant head coach/secondary – Steve Wilks; Offensive coaches: Offensive coordinator – Mike Shula; Quarterbacks – Ken Dorsey; Running backs – Jim Skipper; Wide receivers – Ricky Proehl; Assistant wide receivers – Cameron Turner; Tight ends – Pete Hoener; Offensive line – John Matsko; Assistant offensive line – Ray Brown | Defensive coaches: Defensive coordinator – Sean McDermott; Defensive line – Eric Washington; Assistant defensive line – Sam Mills III; Linebackers – Al Holcomb; Assistant defensive backs – Richard Rodgers Sr.; Special teams coaches: Special teams coordinator – Bruce DeHaven; Assistant special teams/nickelbacks – Curtis Fuller; Assistant special teams – Russ Purnell; Strength and conditioning: Strength and conditioning – Joe Kenn; Cardio coach – Henry Phillips; Dietitian – Jack Beilman; Assistant strength and conditioning – Jason Benguche |

== Final roster ==
2015 Carolina Panthers roster
| Quarterbacks (QB): 3 Derek Anderson; 1 Cam Newton; Running backs (RB): 34 Cameron Artis-Payne; 28 Jonathan Stewart; 35 Mike Tolbert FB; 32 Brandon Wegh; 43 Fozzy Whittaker; Wide receivers (WR): 11 Brenton Bersin; 10 Corey Brown; 82 Jerricho Cotchery; 17 Devin Funchess; 19 Ted Ginn Jr.; 81 Kevin Norwood; 14 Joe Webb; Tight ends (TE): 84 Ed Dickson; 88 Greg Olsen; 80 Scott Simonson | Offensive linemen (OL): 67 Ryan Kalil C; 68 Andrew Norwell G; 73 Michael Oher T; 74 Mike Remmers T; 79 Chris Scott G; 70 Trai Turner G; 61 Fernando Velasco C; 60 Daryl Williams T; Defensive linemen (DL): 97 Mario Addison DE; 69 Jared Allen DE; 91 Ryan Delaire DE; 94 Kony Ealy DE; 92 Dwan Edwards DT; 95 Charles Johnson DE; 98 Star Lotulelei DT; 93 Kyle Love DT; 99 Kawann Short DT | Linebackers (LB): 58 Thomas Davis OLB; 53 Ben Jacobs OLB; 56 A. J. Klein; 59 Luke Kuechly MLB; 55 David Mayo MLB; 54 Shaq Thompson OLB; Defensive backs (DB): 33 Tre Boston FS; 20 Kurt Coleman FS; 26 Cortland Finnegan CB; 41 Roman Harper SS; 42 Colin Jones FS; 29 Dean Marlowe SS; 27 Robert McClain CB; 24 Josh Norman CB; 31 Charles Tillman CB; 21 Teddy Williams CB; Special teams (ST): 9 Graham Gano K; 44 J. J. Jansen LS; 8 Brad Nortman P | Practice squad: 65 Chas Alecxih DT; 85 Nate Askew TE; 36 Marcus Ball SS; 51 Brian Blechen OLB; 18 Damiere Byrd WR; 77 Rakim Cox DE; 62 Reese Dismukes G; 37 Ras-I Dowling FS; 63 David Foucault T; 22 Lou Young CB; Reserve: 90 Frank Alexander DE (IR); 13 Kelvin Benjamin WR (IR); 25 Bené Benwikere CB (IR); 78 Nate Chandler T (IR); 69 Tyronne Green G (IR); 87 Stephen Hill WR (IR); 71 Arthur Miley DE (IR); 66 Amini Silatolu G (IR); Rookies in italics 53 active, 8 reserve, 10 practice squad |

== Schedule ==
=== Preseason ===
| Week | Date | Opponent | Result | Record | Venue | Recap |
|---|---|---|---|---|---|---|
| 1 | August 14 | at Buffalo Bills | **W** 25–24 | 1–0 | Ralph Wilson Stadium | Recap |
| 2 | August 22 | Miami Dolphins | **W** 31–30 | 2–0 | Bank of America Stadium | Recap |
| 3 | August 28 | New England Patriots | **L** 16–17 | 2–1 | Bank of America Stadium | Recap |
| 4 | September 3 | at Pittsburgh Steelers | **W** 23–6 | 3–1 | Heinz Field | Recap |

=== Regular season ===
| Week | Date | Opponent | Result | Record | Venue | Recap |
|---|---|---|---|---|---|---|
| 1 | September 13 | at Jacksonville Jaguars | **W** 20–9 | 1–0 | EverBank Field | Recap |
| 2 | September 20 | Houston Texans | **W** 24–17 | 2–0 | Bank of America Stadium | Recap |
| 3 | September 27 | **New Orleans Saints** | **W** 27–22 | 3–0 | Bank of America Stadium | Recap |
| 4 | October 4 | at **Tampa Bay Buccaneers** | **W** 37–23 | 4–0 | Raymond James Stadium | Recap |
| 5 | Bye | | | | | |
| 6 | October 18 | at Seattle Seahawks | **W** 27–23 | 5–0 | CenturyLink Field | Recap |
| 7 | October 25 | Philadelphia Eagles | **W** 27–16 | 6–0 | Bank of America Stadium | Recap |
| 8 | November 2 | Indianapolis Colts | **W** 29–26 (OT) | 7–0 | Bank of America Stadium | Recap |
| 9 | November 8 | Green Bay Packers | **W** 37–29 | 8–0 | Bank of America Stadium | Recap |
| 10 | November 15 | at Tennessee Titans | **W** 27–10 | 9–0 | Nissan Stadium | Recap |
| 11 | November 22 | Washington Redskins | **W** 44–16 | 10–0 | Bank of America Stadium | Recap |
| 12 | November 26 | at Dallas Cowboys | **W** 33–14 | 11–0 | AT&T Stadium | Recap |
| 13 | December 6 | at **New Orleans Saints** | **W** 41–38 | 12–0 | Mercedes-Benz Superdome | Recap |
| 14 | December 13 | **Atlanta Falcons** | **W** 38–0 | 13–0 | Bank of America Stadium | Recap |
| 15 | December 20 | at New York Giants | **W** 38–35 | 14–0 | MetLife Stadium | Recap |
| 16 | December 27 | at **Atlanta Falcons** | **L** 13–20 | 14–1 | Georgia Dome | Recap |
| 17 | January 3 | **Tampa Bay Buccaneers** | **W** 38–10 | 15–1 | Bank of America Stadium | Recap |

Note: Intra-division opponents are in bold text.

=== Postseason ===
| Round | Date | Opponent (seed) | Result | Record | Venue | Recap |
|---|---|---|---|---|---|---|
| Wild Card | First-round bye | | | | | |
| Divisional | January 17, 2016 | Seattle Seahawks (6) | **W** 31–24 | 1–0 | Bank of America Stadium | Recap |
| NFC Championship | January 24, 2016 | Arizona Cardinals (2) | **W** 49–15 | 2–0 | Bank of America Stadium | Recap |
| Super Bowl 50 | February 7, 2016 | vs. Denver Broncos (A1) | **L** 10–24 | 2–1 | Levi's Stadium | Recap |

== Game summaries ==
=== Regular season ===
==== Week 1: at Jacksonville Jaguars ====
Week One: Carolina Panthers at Jacksonville Jaguars – Game summary

| Quarter | 1 | 2 | 3 | 4 | Total |
|---|---|---|---|---|---|
| Panthers | 3 | 7 | 7 | 3 | 20 |
| Jaguars | 3 | 6 | 0 | 0 | 9 |

at EverBank Field, Jacksonville, Florida

- Date: September 13
- Game time: 1:00 p.m. EDT
- Game weather: 77 °F (25 °C), 0% chance of rain
- Game attendance: 60,733
- Referee: Ron Torbert
- TV announcers (Fox): Chris Myers, Ronde Barber and Jennifer Hale
- Recap, Gamebook

Game information

First quarter

- CAR – Graham Gano 43-yard field goal, 7:49. Panthers 3–0. Drive: 14 plays, 55 yards, 5:47.
- JAX – Jason Myers 22-yard field goal, 0:59. Tied 3–3. Drive: 11 plays, 54 yards, 4:26.

Second quarter

- CAR – Jerricho Cotchery 7-yard pass from Cam Newton, (Graham Gano kick), 1:52. Panthers 10–3. Drive: 12 plays, 66 yards, 5:27.
- JAX – Rashad Greene 1-yard pass from Blake Bortles, (Jason Myers missed XP), 0:14. Panthers 10–9. Drive: 9 plays, 65 yards, 1:38.

Third quarter

- CAR – Josh Norman 30-yard interception return, (Graham Gano kick), 9:01. Panthers 17–9.

Fourth quarter

- CAR – Graham Gano 47-yard field goal, 2:41. Panthers 20–9. Drive: 15 plays, 64 yards, 8:07.

Top passers

- CAR – Cam Newton – 18/31, 175 yards, TD, INT
- JAX – Blake Bortles – 22/40, 183 yards, TD, 2 INT

Top rushers

- CAR – Jonathan Stewart – 18 rushes, 56 yards
- JAX – T. J. Yeldon – 12 rushes, 51 yards

Top receivers

- CAR – Ted Ginn Jr. – 2 rec, 54 yards
- JAX – Allen Hurns – 5 rec, 60 yards

Top tacklers

- CAR – Thomas Davis – 7 tackles, sack
- JAX – Paul Posluszny – 9 tackles

Panthers CB Josh Norman intercepted one of Blake Bortles' passes, returning it for a touchdown and WR Jericho Cotchery caught the first Panthers offensive TD of the year as Carolina started the 2015 season 1–0. However, linebacker Luke Kuechly sustained a concussion during the game and would be out for the next three weeks.

==== Week 2: vs. Houston Texans ====
Week Two: Houston Texans at Carolina Panthers – Game summary

| Quarter | 1 | 2 | 3 | 4 | Total |
|---|---|---|---|---|---|
| Texans | 3 | 0 | 7 | 7 | 17 |
| Panthers | 0 | 10 | 7 | 7 | 24 |

at Bank of America Stadium, Charlotte, North Carolina

- Date: September 20
- Game time: 1:00 pm. EDT
- Game weather: 88 °F (31 °C), sunny
- Game attendance: 73,254
- Referee: Clete Blakeman
- TV announcers (CBS): Greg Gumbel, Trent Green and Jamie Erdahl
- Recap, Gamebook

Game information

First quarter

- HOU – Randy Bullock 43-yard field goal, 7:57. Texans 3–0. Drive: 13 plays, 53 yards, 3:48.

Second quarter

- CAR – Ted Ginn Jr. 25-yard pass from Cam Newton, (Graham Gano kick), 11:22. Panthers 7–3. Drive: 5 plays, 74 yards, 2:04.
- CAR – Graham Gano 28-yard field goal, 5:26. Panthers 10–3. Drive: 10 plays, 51 yards, 4:39.

Third quarter

- HOU – Garrett Graham 7-yard pass from Ryan Mallett, (Randy Bullock kick), 8:29. Tied 10–10. Drive: 13 plays, 80 yards, 6:31.
- CAR – Cam Newton 2-yard run, (Graham Gano kick), 1:04. Panthers 17–10. Drive: 14 plays, 80 yards, 7:25.

Fourth quarter

- CAR – Corey Brown 36-yard pass from Cam Newton, (Graham Gano kick), 8:53. Panthers 24–10. Drive: 1 play, 36 yards, 0:09.
- HOU – Ryan Mallett 6-yard run, (Randy Bullock kick), 6:31. Panthers 24–17. Drive: 7 plays, 80 yards, 2:22.

Top passers

- HOU – Ryan Mallett – 27/58, 244 yards, TD, INT
- CAR – Cam Newton – 18/37, 195 yards, 2 TD, INT

Top rushers

- HOU – Chris Polk – 14 rushes, 38 yards
- CAR – Cam Newton – 10 rushes, 76 yards, TD

Top receivers

- HOU – Nate Washington – 3 rec, 63 yards
- CAR – Greg Olsen – 6 rec, 70 yards

Top tacklers

- HOU – Quintin Demps – 8 tackles, 0.5 sacks
- CAR – Kurt Coleman – 9 tackles

Carolina's home opener was highlighted by QB Cam Newton's flip into the end zone in the 3rd quarter. Despite the athletic move, the team still had to endure a final Houston drive to ensure the victory. With the win, the Panthers improved to 2–0.

==== Week 3: vs. New Orleans Saints ====
Week Three: New Orleans Saints at Carolina Panthers – Game summary

| Quarter | 1 | 2 | 3 | 4 | Total |
|---|---|---|---|---|---|
| Saints | 3 | 7 | 6 | 6 | 22 |
| Panthers | 0 | 10 | 10 | 7 | 27 |

at Bank of America Stadium, Charlotte, North Carolina

- Date: September 27
- Game time: 1:00 pm. EDT
- Game weather: 69 °F (21 °C), rain
- Game attendance: 73,402
- Referee: Ed Hochuli
- TV announcers (Fox): Chris Myers, Ronde Barber and Jennifer Hale
- Recap, Gamebook

Game information

First quarter

- NO – Zach Hocker 31-yard field goal, 9:00. Saints 3–0. Drive: 12 plays, 67 yards, 6:00.

Second quarter

- NO – Mark Ingram II 5-yard run, (Zach Hocker kick), 11:44. Saints 10–0. Drive: 16 plays, 94 yards, 9:11.
- CAR – Greg Olsen 11-yard pass from Cam Newton, (Graham Gano kick), 5:14. Saints 10–7. Drive: 12 plays, 80 yards, 6:30.
- CAR – Graham Gano 20-yard field goal, 0:02. Tied 10–10. Drive: 11 plays, 79 yards, 2:04.

Third quarter

- NO – Marcus Murphy 74-yard punt return, (2-point conversion: run failed), 12:31. Saints 16–10.
- CAR – Greg Olsen 11-yard pass from Cam Newton, (Graham Gano kick), 8:43. Panthers 17–16. Drive: 6 plays, 83 yards, 3:48.
- CAR – Graham Gano 47-yard field goal, 1:31. Panthers 20–16. Drive: 9 plays, 29 yards, 3:16.

Fourth quarter

- CAR – Cam Newton 13-yard run, (Graham Gano kick), 9:32. Panthers 27–16. Drive: 9 plays, 88 yards, 4:05.
- NO – Khiry Robinson 2-yard run, (2-point conversion: pass failed), 4:50. Panthers 27–22. Drive: 10 plays, 80 yards, 4:42.

Top passers

- NO – Luke McCown – 31/38, 310 yards, INT
- CAR – Cam Newton – 20/31, 315 yards, 2 TD

Top rushers

- NO – Mark Ingram II – 14 rushes, 50 yards, TD
- CAR – Jonathan Stewart – 14 rushes, 52 yards

Top receivers

- NO – Brandin Cooks – 7 rec, 79 yards
- CAR – Greg Olsen – 8 rec, 134 yards, 2 TD

Top tacklers

- NO – Ramon Humber – 9 tackles
- CAR – Thomas Davis – 10 tackles

In a close contest the Saints, with backup QB Luke McCown starting in place of an injured Drew Brees, almost stole the victory. McCown threw for over 300 yards as the score went back and forth. On the Saints last drive, McCown's 4th quarter end zone heave was intercepted by Josh Norman, sealing the win for Carolina. With the victory, the Panthers improved to 3–0.

==== Week 4: at Tampa Bay Buccaneers ====
Week Four: Carolina Panthers at Tampa Bay Buccaneers – Game summary

| Quarter | 1 | 2 | 3 | 4 | Total |
|---|---|---|---|---|---|
| Panthers | 10 | 7 | 14 | 6 | 37 |
| Buccaneers | 3 | 7 | 7 | 6 | 23 |

at Raymond James Stadium, Tampa, Florida

- Date: October 4
- Game time: 1:00 pm. EDT
- Game weather: 74 °F (23 °C), cloudy
- Game attendance: 57,468
- Referee: Gene Steratore
- TV announcers (Fox): Chris Myers, Ronde Barber and Jennifer Hale
- Recap, Gamebook

Game information

First quarter

- CAR – Graham Gano 24-yard field goal, 12:09. Panthers 3–0. Drive: 5 plays, 15 yards, 2:12.
- CAR – Josh Norman 46-yard interception return, (Graham Gano kick), 10:41. 'Panthers 10–0. Drive: 3 plays, 2 yards, 1:28.
- TB – Kyle Brindza 42-yard field goal, 7:03. Panthers 10–3. Drive: 7 plays, 39 yards, 3:38.

Second quarter

- CAR – Ted Ginn Jr. 6-yard pass from Cam Newton, (Graham Gano kick), 10:50. Panthers 17–3. Drive: 8 plays, 45 yards, 3:24.
- TB – Doug Martin 5-yard run, (Kyle Brindza kick), 4:23. Panthers 17–10. Drive: 13 plays, 80 yards, 6:27.

Third quarter

- CAR – Ed Dickson 57-yard fumble recovery, (Graham Gano kick), 12:25. Panthers 24–10. Drive: 1 play, 67 yards, 0:13.
- CAR – Ted Ginn Jr. 12-yard pass from Cam Newton, (Graham Gano kick), 7:25. Panthers 31–10. Drive: 5 plays, 33 yards, 2:25.
- TB – Charles Sims 10-yard pass from Jameis Winston, (Kyle Brindza kick), 2:48. Panthers 31–17. Drive: 8 plays, 80 yards, 4:37.

Fourth quarter

- CAR – Graham Gano 27-yard field goal, 13:28. Panthers 34–17. Drive: 8 plays, 60 yards, 4:20.
- CAR – Graham Gano 27-yard field goal, 4:15. Panthers 37–17. Drive: 6 plays, 20 yards, 2:41.
- TB – Vincent Jackson 6-yard pass from Jameis Winston, (kick failed), 0:58. Panthers 37–23. Drive: 11 plays, 81 yards, 3:17.

Top passers

- CAR – Cam Newton – 11/22, 124 yards, 2 TD
- TB – Jameis Winston – 26/43, 287 yards, 2 TD, 4 INT

Top rushers

- CAR – Cam Newton – 12 rushes, 51 yards
- TB – Doug Martin – 20 rushes, 106 yards

Top receivers

- CAR – Brenton Bersin – 4 rec, 54 yards
- TB – Vincent Jackson – 10 rec, 147 yards

Top tacklers

- CAR – Thomas Davis – 11 tackles
- TB – Chris Conte – 8 tackles

Josh Norman had his second pick-six of the season and Tampa Bay QB Jameis Winston threw 4 interceptions, with Norman intercepting a second one later in the game. On the game's most bizarre play, the ball was stripped from RB Jonathan Stewart by a Tampa defender; the ball flew up in the air and TE Ed Dickson, who'd been trailing the play, grabbed it and ran untouched into the end zone. With the victory, the Panthers improved to 4–0. Carolina also became one of five teams to finish the first quarter of the season undefeated overall, and one of three NFC teams to do so.

==== Week 6: at Seattle Seahawks ====
Week Six: Carolina Panthers at Seattle Seahawks – Game summary

| Quarter | 1 | 2 | 3 | 4 | Total |
|---|---|---|---|---|---|
| Panthers | 0 | 7 | 7 | 13 | 27 |
| Seahawks | 3 | 7 | 10 | 3 | 23 |

at CenturyLink Field, Seattle, Washington

- Date: October 18
- Game time: 4:05 pm. EDT/1:05 p.m. PDT
- Game weather: 61 °F (16 °C), cloudy
- Game attendance: 69,020
- Referee: Terry McAulay
- TV announcers (Fox): Sam Rosen, John Lynch and Pam Oliver
- Recap, Gamebook

Game information

First quarter

- SEA – Steven Hauschka 30-yard field goal, 5:37. Seahawks 3–0. Drive: 5 plays, 21 yards, 2:36.

Second quarter

- CAR – Cam Newton 2-yard run, (Graham Gano kick), 13:30. Panthers 7–3. Drive: 14 plays, 80 yards, 7:07.
- SEA – Marshawn Lynch 1-yard run, (Steven Hauschka kick), 8:00. Seahawks 10–7. 12 plays, 90 yards, 5:30.

Third quarter

- SEA – Ricardo Lockette 40-yard pass from Russell Wilson, (Steven Hauschka kick), 11:27. Seahawks 17–7. Drive: 4 plays, 63 yards, 1:58.
- SEA – Steven Hauschka 50-yard field goal, 8:49. Seahawks 20–7. Drive: 4 plays, 1 yard, 1:51.
- CAR – Jonathan Stewart 1-yard run, (Graham Gano kick), 3:34. Seahawks 20–14. Drive: 11 plays, 80 yards, 5:15.

Fourth quarter

- SEA – Steven Hauschka 43-yard field goal, 11:46. Seahawks 23–14. Drive: 8 plays, 59 yards, 4:11.
- CAR – Jonathan Stewart 1-yard run, (kick failed), 3:55. Seahawks 23–20. Drive: 9 plays, 80 yards, 4:13.
- CAR – Greg Olsen 26-yard pass from Cam Newton, (Graham Gano kick), 0:32. Panthers 27–23. Drive: 8 plays 80 yards, 1:48.

Top passers

- CAR – Cam Newton – 20/36, 269 yards, TD, 2 INT
- SEA – Russell Wilson – 18/30, 241 yards, TD

Top rushers

- CAR – Jonathan Stewart – 20 rushes, 78 yards
- SEA – Marshawn Lynch – 17 rushes, 54 yards

Top receivers

- CAR – Greg Olsen – 7 rec, 131 yards
- SEA – Jimmy Graham – 8 rec, 140 yards

Top tacklers

- CAR – Luke Kuechly – 14 tackles
- SEA – K.J. Wright – 12 tackles

After a bye week the Panthers flew to Washington state for their fifth meeting with the Seattle Seahawks in the Rivera/Newton era; the past four meetings were all close, low-scoring games won by Seattle. Challenges started early on game day for the Panthers, as a fire alarm was pulled at 5:40 am at their hotel. Mere hours later, in front of a capacity crowd at CenturyLink Field, Carolina overcame a slow first three-quarters, including giving up a reverse flea flicker TD pass, to stun the Seahawks in the 4th. After coming back from a 14-point deficit (down 20–7 at one point), Carolina's defense managed to stop Seattle's offense. With just over two minutes to play Cam Newton led the offense down the field 80 yards (the fourth time he'd done so in the game) down 23–20. The drive concluded at around half a minute to play, when Newton found TE Greg Olsen wide open in the end zone for the go-ahead touchdown. Carolina's defense stuffed Seattle's last offensive possession, ending the game. With the surprising win, the Panthers improved to 5–0, their first such start since 2003. It was also in this game that Cam Newton debuted the 'dab' touchdown dance after a rushing TD, which was quickly imitated by other players around the NFL and in college football.

==== Week 7: vs. Philadelphia Eagles ====
Week Seven: Philadelphia Eagles at Carolina Panthers – Game summary

| Quarter | 1 | 2 | 3 | 4 | Total |
|---|---|---|---|---|---|
| Eagles | 0 | 6 | 10 | 0 | 16 |
| Panthers | 7 | 7 | 7 | 6 | 27 |

at Bank of America Stadium, Charlotte, North Carolina

- Date: October 25
- Game time: 8:30 pm. EDT
- Game weather: 71 °F (22 °C), cloudy
- Game attendance: 74,194
- Referee: Craig Wrolstad
- TV announcers (NBC): Al Michaels, Cris Collinsworth and Michele Tafoya
- Recap, Gamebook

Game information

First quarter

- CAR – Mike Tolbert 2-yard run, (Graham Gano kick), 9:24. Panthers 7–0. Drive: 4 plays, 72 yards, 2:36.

Second quarter

- PHI – Caleb Sturgis 52-yard field goal, 5:42. Panthers 7–3. Drive: 8 plays, 37 yards, 2:26.
- CAR – Cam Newton 2-yard run, (Graham Gano kick), 3:33. Panthers 14–3. Drive: 4 plays, 60 yards, 2:09.
- PHI – Caleb Sturgis 29-yard field goal, 0:04. Panthers 14–6. Drive: 7 plays, 28 yards, 1:01.

Third quarter

- CAR – Mike Tolbert 2-yard pass from Cam Newton, (Graham Gano kick), 11:50. Panthers 21–6. Drive: 7 plays, 80 yards, 3:10.
- PHI – Ryan Matthews 63-yard run, (Caleb Sturgis kick), 9:32. Panthers 21–13. Drive: 5 plays, 80 yards, 2:18.
- PHI – Caleb Sturgis 24-yard field goal, 5:48. Panthers 21–16. Drive: 7 plays, 12 yards, 2:52.

Fourth quarter

- CAR – Graham Gano 35-yard field goal, 8:59. Panthers 24–16. Drive: 8 plays, 43 yards, 2:59.
- CAR – Graham Gano 29-yard field goal, 0:18. Panthers 27–16. Drive: 4 plays, 5 yards, 1:37.

Top passers

- PHI – Sam Bradford – 26/46, 205 yards, TD, INT
- CAR – Cam Newton – 14/24, 197 yards, TD, 3 INT

Top rushers

- PHI – Ryan Matthews – 6 rushes, 97 yards
- CAR – Jonathan Stewart – 24 rushes, 125 yards

Top receivers

- PHI – Zach Ertz – 5 rec, 63 yards
- CAR – Greg Olsen – 3 rec, 65 yards

Top tacklers

- PHI – Nolan Carroll II – 9 tackles
- CAR – Thomas Davis – 13 tackles

Carolina pulled out the pregame fireworks for their team introduction. Newton threw and ran for scores and fullback Mike Tolbert was responsible for two touchdowns. With yet another close win, this one coming down to a failed Eagles 4th-down conversion, the Panthers went 6–0 for the first time in franchise history. It also marked their first home victory on Sunday Night Football since 2009. This would be NBC Sunday Night Football's last game in Charlotte since until 2026.

==== Week 8: vs. Indianapolis Colts ====
Week Eight: Indianapolis Colts at Carolina Panthers – Game summary

| Quarter | 1 | 2 | 3 | 4 | OT | Total |
|---|---|---|---|---|---|---|
| Colts | 0 | 6 | 0 | 17 | 3 | 26 |
| Panthers | 10 | 0 | 7 | 6 | 6 | 29 |

at Bank of America Stadium, Charlotte, North Carolina

- Date: November 2
- Game time: 8:30 pm. EST
- Game weather: 60 °F (16 °C), light rain
- Game attendance: 74,136
- Referee: Bill Vinovich
- TV announcers (ESPN): Mike Tirico, Jon Gruden and Lisa Salters
- Recap, Gamebook

Game information

First quarter

- CAR – Graham Gano 39-yard field goal, 13:41. Panthers 3–0. Drive: 4 plays, 3 yards, 0:44.
- CAR – Jonathan Stewart 3-yard run, (Graham Gano kick), 7:21. Panthers 10–0. Drive: 11 plays, 37 yards, 5:03.

Second quarter

- IND – Adam Vinatieri 47-yard field goal, 10:24. Panthers 10–3. Drive: 7 plays, 27 yards, 4:16.
- IND – Adam Vinatieri 34-yard field goal, 7:04. Panthers 10–6. Drive: 4 plays, 6 yards, 1:04.

Third quarter

- CAR – Greg Olsen 27-yard pass from Cam Newton, (Graham Gano kick), 0:14. Panthers 17–6. Drive: 2 plays, 29 yards, 0:48.

Fourth quarter

- CAR – Corey Brown 8-yard pass from Cam Newton, (kick failed), 10:44. Panthers 23–6. Drive: 3 plays, 30 yards, 1:24.
- IND – Andre Johnson 18-yard pass from Andrew Luck, (Adam Vinatieri kick), 7:04. Panthers 23–13. Drive: 8 plays, 86 yards, 3:40.
- IND – Coby Fleener 8-yard pass from Andrew Luck, (Adam Vinatieri kick), 2:27. Panthers 23–20. Drive: 8 plays, 57 yards, 2:15.
- IND – Adam Vinatieri 24-yard field goal, 0:00. Tied 23–23. Drive: 16 plays, 54 yards, 2:02.

Overtime

- IND – Adam Vinatieri 50-yard field goal, 12:04. Colts 26–23. Drive: 6 plays, 23 yards, 2:56.
- CAR – Graham Gano 42-yard field goal, 7:50. Tied 26–26. Drive: 9 plays, 57 yards, 4:14.
- CAR – Graham Gano 52-yard field goal, 5:22. Panthers 29–26. Drive: 4 plays, 5 yards, 1:40.

Top passers

- IND – Andrew Luck – 23/47, 231 yards, 2 TD, 3 INT
- CAR – Cam Newton – 16/35, 248 yards, 2 TD, INT

Top rushers

- IND – Frank Gore – 22 rushes, 70 yards
- CAR – Jonathan Stewart – 24 rushes, 82 yards

Top receivers

- IND – Andre Johnson – 4 rec, 81 yards
- CAR – Greg Olsen – 6 rec, 79 yards

Top tacklers

- IND – D'Qwell Jackson – 13 tackles
- CAR – Luke Kuechly – 14 tackles

The Panthers came into the Monday night game as one of four undefeated teams in the NFL, while playing their second game in eight days. The team took to the field amid fireworks, as is their custom for prime-time contests. A heavy rain kept up most of the night, which saw both the drenched crowd of over 74,000 stay in their seats and a 23–6 Panther lead dissolve by a 17-point Colts comeback in the 4th. Indianapolis sent the game into overtime with a field goal following a near-pick by Kuechly; the extra period began close to midnight. Each team managed a field goal on their first two possessions. Carolina got a break when Colts QB Andrew Luck threw his third interception, which was picked off by Kuechly on the game's 154th play, according to ESPN play-by-play man Mike Tirico. A few plays later, Panthers kicker Graham Gano hit a 52-yard field goal, his longest of the season, to give Carolina the win early Tuesday morning. With the win, the Panthers went 7–0 for the first time in franchise history. Also, Carolina became the last undefeated team in the NFC with the Packers' loss to the Broncos the previous night on Sunday Night Football.

==== Week 9: vs. Green Bay Packers ====
Week Nine: Green Bay Packers at Carolina Panthers – Game summary

| Quarter | 1 | 2 | 3 | 4 | Total |
|---|---|---|---|---|---|
| Packers | 7 | 0 | 7 | 15 | 29 |
| Panthers | 3 | 24 | 3 | 7 | 37 |

at Bank of America Stadium, Charlotte, North Carolina

- Date: November 8
- Game time: 1:00 pm. EST
- Game weather: 57 °F (14 °C), cloudy
- Game attendance: 74,461
- Referee: Gene Steratore
- TV announcers (Fox): Joe Buck, Troy Aikman and Erin Andrews
- Recap, Gamebook

Game information

First quarter

- CAR – Graham Gano 20-yard field goal, 10:12. Panthers 3–0. Drive: 9 plays, 68 yards, 4:48.
- GB – Richard Rodgers 1-yard pass from Aaron Rodgers, (Mason Crosby kick), 0:55. Packers 7–3. Drive: 11 plays, 65 yards, 5:51.

Second quarter

- CAR – Cam Newton 1-yard run, (Graham Gano kick), 12:09. Panthers 10–7. Drive: 7 plays, 80 yards, 3:46.
- CAR – Greg Olsen 7-yard pass from Cam Newton, (Graham Gano kick), 8:55. Panthers 17–7. Drive: 3 plays, 62 yards, 1:24.
- CAR – Graham Gano 49-yard field goal, 4:59. Panthers 20–7. Drive: 6 plays, 20 yards, 2:55.
- CAR – Corey Brown 39-yard pass from Cam Newton, (Graham Gano kick), 0:41. Panthers 27–7. Drive: 4 plays, 52 yards, 1:12.

Third quarter

- GB – Randall Cobb 53-yard pass from Aaron Rodgers, (Mason Crosby kick), 14:00. Panthers 27–14. Drive: 3 plays, 80 yards, 1:00.
- CAR – Graham Gano 22-yard field goal, 4:48. Panthers 30–14. Drive: 13 plays, 82 yards, 6:35.

Fourth quarter

- CAR – Devin Funchess 14-yard pass from Cam Newton, (Graham Gano kick), 9:22. Panthers 37–14. Drive: 5 plays, 74 yards, 2:21.
- GB – James Starks 29-yard pass from Aaron Rodgers, (2-point conversion: Davante Adams pass from Aaron Rodgers), 7:54. Panthers 37–22. Drive: 6 plays, 79 yards, 1:28.
- GB – Richard Rodgers 3-yard pass from Aaron Rodgers, (Mason Crosby kick), 3:43. Panthers 37–29. Drive: 8 plays, 72 yards, 2:38.

Top passers

- GB – Aaron Rodgers – 25/48, 369 yards, 4 TDs, INT
- CAR – Cam Newton – 15/30, 297 yards, 3 TDs, INT

Top rushers

- GB – James Starks – 10 rushes, 39 yards
- CAR – Jonathan Stewart – 20 rushes, 66 yards

Top receivers

- GB – Randall Cobb – 4 receptions, 99 yards, TD
- CAR – Jerricho Cotchery – 3 receptions, 82 yards

Top tacklers

- GB – Jake Ryan – 6 tackles, 1 tackle for loss
- CAR – Luke Kuechly – 6 tackles

Green Bay came into Charlotte looking for a much-needed victory after their loss to Denver. The game was a 27–7 Panthers blowout in the first half, but came down to the wire as the Packers mounted a 4th quarter comeback, answered only by a single Panthers offensive TD. The last few minutes saw the Packers drive deep into Panthers territory, looking to get a touchdown and a game-tying two-point conversion. However, LB Thomas Davis intercepted an Aaron Rodgers pass on 4th down inside the red zone, ensuring the win for Carolina. With the close win the Panthers improved to 8–0 for the first time in franchise history. They were one of three teams to finish the first half of the season undefeated.

==== Week 10: at Tennessee Titans ====
Week Ten: Carolina Panthers at Tennessee Titans – Game summary

| Quarter | 1 | 2 | 3 | 4 | Total |
|---|---|---|---|---|---|
| Panthers | 7 | 7 | 3 | 10 | 27 |
| Titans | 7 | 3 | 0 | 0 | 10 |

at Nissan Stadium, Nashville, Tennessee

- Date: November 15
- Game time: 1:00 pm. EST/12:00 p.m. CST
- Game weather: 57 °F (14 °C), cloudy
- Game attendance: 63,591
- Referee: Walt Anderson
- TV announcers (Fox): Thom Brennaman, Charles Davis and Tony Siragusa
- Recap, Gamebook

Game information

First quarter

- CAR – Jonathan Stewart 16-yard run, (Graham Gano kick), 8:43. Panthers 7–0. Drive: 8 plays, 63 yards, 5:15.
- TEN – Dexter McCluster 25-yard run, (Ryan Succop kick), 3:47. Tied 7–7. Drive: 10 plays, 82 yards, 4:58.

Second quarter

- CAR – Ed Dickson 1-yard pass from Cam Newton,(Graham Gano kick), 13:17. Panthers 14–7. Drive: 9 plays, 80 yards, 5:24.
- TEN – Ryan Succop 45-yard field goal, 7:51. Panthers 14–10. Drive: 9 plays, 54 yards, 5:29.

Third quarter

- CAR – Graham Gano 48-yard field goal, 0:28. Panthers 17–10. Drive: 7 plays, 39 yards, 3:38.

Fourth quarter

- CAR – Graham Gano 19-yard field goal, 9:10. Panthers 20–10. Drive: 8 plays, 42 yards, 4:16.
- CAR – Cam Newton 2-yard run, (Graham Gano kick), 2:48. Panthers 27–10. Drive: 10 plays, 64 yards, 4:44.

Top passers

- CAR – Cam Newton – 21/25, 217 yards, TD
- TEN – Marcus Mariota – 16/24, 185 yards, INT

Top rushers

- CAR – Jonathan Stewart – 22 rushes, 91 yards, TD
- TEN – Dexter McCluster – 3 rushes, 25 yards, TD

Top receivers

- CAR – Greg Olsen – 8 rec, 80 yards
- TEN – Delanie Walker – 3 rec, 52 yards

Top tacklers

- CAR – Luke Kuechly – 8 tackles, FF
- TEN – Avery Williamson – 14 tackles

The Panthers' hot streak continued as they went 9–0 for the first time in franchise history, eclipsing the eight-game win streak during the 2013 season. Carolina also won its first game against the Titans ever since they relocated to Tennessee. After the Cincinnati Bengals lost on Monday Night Football the next night, Carolina was one of 2 undefeateds left in the NFL, with the other being New England.

==== Week 11: vs. Washington Redskins ====
Week Eleven: Washington Redskins at Carolina Panthers – Game summary

| Quarter | 1 | 2 | 3 | 4 | Total |
|---|---|---|---|---|---|
| Redskins | 14 | 0 | 0 | 2 | 16 |
| Panthers | 14 | 17 | 10 | 3 | 44 |

at Bank of America Stadium, Charlotte, North Carolina

- Date: November 22
- Game time: 1:00 pm. EST
- Game weather: 50 °F (10 °C), mostly sunny
- Game attendance: 74,418
- Referee: Jerome Boger
- TV announcers (Fox): Thom Brennaman, Charles Davis and Tony Siragusa
- Recap, Gamebook

Game information

First quarter

- CAR – Jonathan Stewart 12-yard TD pass from Cam Newton (Graham Gano made PAT) 9:56. Carolina 7–0. Drive: 3 plays, 31 yards, 1:28.
- WAS – DeSean Jackson 56-yard TD pass from Kirk Cousins (Dustin Hopkins made PAT) 8:26. Tied 7–7. Drive: 3 plays, 71 yards, 1:30.
- CAR – Mike Tolbert 3-yard TD pass from Cam Newton (Graham Gano made PAT) 0:41. Carolina 14–7. Drive: 13 plays, 85 yards, 7:45.
- WAS – Andre Roberts 99-yard TD kick return (Dustin Hopkins made PAT) 0:27. Tied 14–14. Drive: 1 play, 0 yards, 0:14

Second quarter

- CAR – Ted Ginn Jr. 2-yard TD pass from Cam Newton (Graham Gano made PAT) 8:21. Carolina 21–14. Drive: 8 plays, 69 yards, 4:06
- CAR – Greg Olsen 5-yard TD pass from Cam Newton (Graham Gano made PAT) 5:14. Carolina 28–14. Drive: 6 plays, 34 yards, 2:51
- CAR – Graham Gano 42-yard FG 0:00. Carolina 31–14. Drive: 8 plays, 38 yards, 1:51

Third quarter

- CAR – Devin Funchess 5-yard TD pass from Cam Newton (Graham Gano made PAT) 13:52. Carolina 38–14. Drive: 3 plays, 6 yards, 0:59
- CAR – Graham Gano 48-yard FG 4:04. Carolina 41–14. Drive: 10 plays, 43 yards, 4:50

Fourth quarter

- CAR – Graham Gano 25-yard FG 10:36. Carolina 44–14. Drive: 9 plays, 58 yards, 5:46
- WAS – Houston Bates Safety 0:16. Carolina 44–16. Drive: 1 play, 0 yards, 0:00

Top passers

- WAS –
- CAR –

Top rushers

- WAS –
- CAR –

Top receivers

- WAS –
- CAR –

Top tacklers

- WAS –
- CAR –

In a game marred with a high number of penalty flags, Carolina overcame a close 1st quarter to roll over Washington for the remainder of the game. Cam Newton tied the franchise record of five touchdown passes in one game. Most of the flags were against Washington's defense, including at least five neutral zone infraction penalties, where a defensive player crosses the imaginary line separating them and the offensive line. The Panthers' winning streak continued as they went 10–0 for the first time in franchise history.

==== Week 12: at Dallas Cowboys ====
Thanksgiving Day game

Week Twelve: Carolina Panthers at Dallas Cowboys – Game summary

| Quarter | 1 | 2 | 3 | 4 | Total |
|---|---|---|---|---|---|
| Panthers | 10 | 13 | 7 | 3 | 33 |
| Cowboys | 3 | 0 | 3 | 8 | 14 |

at AT&T Stadium, Arlington, Texas

- Date: November 26
- Game time: 4:30 pm. EST/3:30 pm. CST
- Game weather: Played indoors (retractable roof closed)
- Game attendance: 90,909
- Referee: Ron Torbert
- TV announcers (CBS): Jim Nantz, Phil Simms and Tracy Wolfson
- Recap, Gamebook

Game information

First quarter

- CAR – Kurt Coleman 36-yard interception return (Graham Gano kick), 14:15. Panthers 7–0.
- CAR – Graham Gano 49-yard field goal, 8:14. Panthers 10–0. Drive: 9 plays, 47 yards, 4:18.
- DAL – Dan Bailey 21-yard field goal, 1:25. Panthers 10–3. Drive: 13 plays, 77 yards, 6:47.

Second quarter

- CAR – Graham Gano 43-yard field goal, 3:32. Panthers 13–3. Drive: 10 plays, 48 yards, 5:48.
- CAR – Luke Kuechly 32-yard interception return (Graham Gano kick), 2:47. Panthers 20–3.
- CAR – Graham Gano 25-yard field goal, 0:03. Panthers 23–3. Drive: 9 plays, 22 yards, 2:23.

Third quarter

- DAL – Dan Bailey 48-yard field goal, 7:53. Panthers 23–6. Drive: 6 plays, 22 yards, 3:35.
- CAR – Cam Newton 4-yard run (Graham Gano kick), 0:25. Panthers 30–6. Drive: 14 plays, 80 yards, 7:29.

Fourth quarter

- CAR – Graham Gano 50-yard field goal, 10:27. Panthers 33–6. Drive: 6 plays, 26 yards, 3:50.
- DAL – Cole Beasley 2-yard pass from Matt Cassel (Matt Cassel-Darren McFadden pass), 4:27. Panthers 33–14. Drive: 16 plays, 80 yards, 6:00.

Top passers

- CAR – Cam Newton – 16/27, 183 yards
- DAL – Tony Romo – 11/21, 106 yards, 3 INT

Top rushers

- CAR – Jonathan Stewart – 21 rushes, 68 yards
- DAL – Robert Turbin – 2 rushes, 11 yards

Top receivers

- CAR – Jerricho Cotchery – 5 receptions, 73 yards
- DAL – Darren McFadden – 4 receptions, 45 yards

Top tacklers

- CAR – Luke Kuechly – 2 tackles, 5 assists, 2 INT, 1 defensive TD
- DAL – Rolando McClain – 7 tackles, 5 assists

In their first Thanksgiving Day game, the Panthers debuted their all-Panther blue Nike "Color Rush" uniforms while the Cowboys debuted all white. The Panthers intercepted three passes from Dallas QB Tony Romo, the first one less than a minute into the game by DB Kurt Coleman, who returned it for a touchdown. Kuechly had his first pick-six of his career minutes later, and on the Cowboys' next offensive series, managed to intercept Romo yet again. Romo was later injured by a sack from Panthers LB Thomas Davis at the end of the third quarter and would leave the game, being replaced by Matt Cassel. He would end up missing the rest of the 2015 season.

With the blowout win, the Panthers improved to 11–0. With the New England Patriots' overtime loss to the Denver Broncos on November 29 during Sunday Night Football, the Panthers became the last undefeated team in the NFL, and would remain so for the following month.

==== Week 13: at New Orleans Saints ====
Week Thirteen: Carolina Panthers at New Orleans Saints – Game summary

| Quarter | 1 | 2 | 3 | 4 | Total |
|---|---|---|---|---|---|
| Panthers | 0 | 13 | 14 | 14 | 41 |
| Saints | 14 | 2 | 8 | 14 | 38 |

at Mercedes-Benz Superdome, New Orleans, Louisiana

- Date: December 6
- Game time: 4:25 pm. EST/3:25 pm. CST
- Game weather: Played indoors (dome stadium)
- Game attendance: 73,097
- Referee: Brad Allen
- TV announcers (Fox): Joe Buck, Troy Aikman and Erin Andrews
- Recap, Gamebook

Game information

First quarter

- NO 8:16 Benjamin Watson 14-yard pass from Drew Brees (Kai Forbath kick) NO 7–0
- NO 4:04 – Stephone Anthony 31-yard fumble return (Kai Forbath kick) NO 14–0

Second quarter

- CAR 14:55 – Mike Tolbert 12-yard pass from Cam Newton (Graham Gano kick) NO 14–7
- CAR 1:55 – Jonathan Stewart 5-yard run NO 14–13
- NO 1:55 – Stephone Anthony defensive PAT conversion NO 16–13

Third quarter

- CAR 10:21 – Ted Ginn Jr. 13-yard pass from Cam Newton (Graham Gano kick) CAR 20–16
- CAR 4:56 – Devin Funchess 13-yard pass from Cam Newton (Graham Gano kick) CAR 27–16
- NO 2:51 – Brandin Cooks 54-yard pass from Drew Brees (Mark Ingram II run for two–point conversion) CAR 27–24

Fourth quarter

- NO 14:02 – Brandon Coleman 24-yard pass from Drew Brees (Kai Forbath kick) NO 31–27
- CAR 11:54 – Ted Ginn Jr. 45-yard pass from Cam Newton (Graham Gano kick) CAR 34–31
- NO 5:21 – Mark Ingram II 9-yard run (Kai Forbath kick) NO 38–34
- CAR 1:05 – Jerricho Cotchery 15-yard pass from Cam Newton (Graham Gano kick) CAR 41–38

Top passers

- CAR – Cam Newton 28/41, 331-yard, 5 TDs, 1 INT
- NO – Drew Brees 24/42, 282 yards, 3 TDs, 1 INT

Top rushers

- CAR – Jonathan Stewart 21 carries, 82 yards, 1 TD, 1 fumble
- NO – Mark Ingram II 12 carries, 56 yards, 1 TD

Top receivers

- CAR – Greg Olsen 9 receptions, 129 yards, 1 fumble
- NO – Brandin Cooks 6 receptions, 104 yards, 1 TD

Top tacklers

- CAR – Thomas Davis 7 tackles, 1 sack, 1 tackle for loss
- NO – James Anderson 11 tackles

Due to the Falcons' loss to the Buccaneers earlier that same day, the Panthers entered this game having already clinched their third straight NFC South title—becoming the first team in the 2015 season to clinch a playoff berth, as well as the first team to clinch their division that season. Led by Drew Brees and a determined defense, New Orleans fought hard all game, their defense recovering three Panthers turnovers- including the first returned extra point attempt for points in NFL history. In the end, Carolina needed a 4th quarter game-winning touchdown drive from the offense (including a 4th down conversion), and a last-second defensive stand to seal it. With the thrilling win, the Panthers became the 9th team in NFL history to start the season 12–0. They also matched their franchise record for most victories in a season. This would be their last division title until 2025.

==== Week 14: vs. Atlanta Falcons ====
Week Fourteen: Atlanta Falcons at Carolina Panthers – Game summary

| Quarter | 1 | 2 | 3 | 4 | Total |
|---|---|---|---|---|---|
| Falcons | 0 | 0 | 0 | 0 | 0 |
| Panthers | 21 | 7 | 10 | 0 | 38 |

at Bank of America Stadium, Charlotte, North Carolina

- Date: December 13
- Game time: 1:00 pm. EST
- Game weather: 70 °F (21 °C), sunny
- Game attendance: 74,420
- Referee: Tony Corrente
- TV announcers (Fox): Kevin Burkhardt, John Lynch and Pam Oliver
- Recap, Gamebook

Game information

First quarter

- CAR – Jonathan Stewart 1-yard run (Graham Gano kick), 11:28. Panthers 7–0. Drive: 8 plays, 80 yards, 3:32.
- CAR – Ted Ginn Jr. 74-yard pass from Cam Newton (Graham Gano kick), 6:48. Panthers 14–0. Drive: 3 plays, 93 yards, 1:18.
- CAR – Ted Ginn Jr. 46-yard pass from Cam Newton (Graham Gano kick), 0:12. Panthers 21–0. Drive: 7 plays, 80 yards, 3:23.

Second quarter

- CAR – Ed Dickson 4-yard pass from Cam Newton (Graham Gano kick), 0:17. Panthers 28–0. Drive: 10 plays, 81 yards, 3:27.

Third quarter

- CAR – Graham Gano 38-yard field goal, 5:46. Panthers 31–0. Drive: 9 plays, 23 yards, 4:45.
- CAR – Fozzy Whittaker 16-yard run (Graham Gano kick), 2:18. Panthers 38–0. Drive: 4 plays, 26 yards, 1:57.

Fourth quarter

- No scoring plays.

Top passers

- ATL – Matt Ryan – 22/34, 224 yards, INT
- CAR – Cam Newton – 15/21, 265 yards, 3 TD

Top rushers

- ATL – Devonta Freeman – 12 rushes, 40 yards
- CAR – Jonathan Stewart – 10 rushes, 75 yards, TD

Top receivers

- ATL – Julio Jones – 7 receptions, 88 yards
- CAR – Ted Ginn Jr. – 2 receptions, 120 yards, 2 TD

Top tacklers

- ATL –
- CAR –

The Panthers shut out Atlanta 38–0 to move to 13–0. Carolina's defense recorded five sacks and four turnovers- two fumbles and two interceptions- and held Atlanta to 54 total yards rushing. Perhaps the most impressive play of the game was Newton's touchdown pass to Ed Dickson, where Newton managed to fit the ball between multiple defenders' hands and into Dickson's grasp. The victory assured the Panthers of no worse than the second seed in the NFC—and with it, a first-round bye in the NFC playoffs. However, the Cardinals' win over the Vikings three days earlier prevented them from also clinching home-field advantage throughout the playoffs. Carolina additionally broke the franchise record of most games won in a regular season (12 games) that had been set in 1996, 2008, and 2013, respectively.

==== Week 15: at New York Giants ====
Week Fifteen: Carolina Panthers at New York Giants – Game summary

| Quarter | 1 | 2 | 3 | 4 | Total |
|---|---|---|---|---|---|
| Panthers | 7 | 14 | 14 | 3 | 38 |
| Giants | 7 | 0 | 7 | 21 | 35 |

at MetLife Stadium, East Rutherford, New Jersey

- Date: December 20
- Game time: 1:00 pm. EST
- Game weather: 41 °F (5 °C), sunny
- Game attendance: 79,436
- Referee: Terry McAulay
- TV announcers (Fox): Joe Buck, Troy Aikman and Erin Andrews
- Recap, Gamebook

Game information

First quarter

- CAR – Ted Ginn Jr. 3-yard pass from Cam Newton (Graham Gano kick), 5:33. Panthers 7–0. Drive: 9 plays, 88 yards, 4:46.
- NYG – Rueben Randle 27-yard pass from Eli Manning (Josh Brown kick), 1:24. Tied 7–7. Drive: 10 plays, 80 yards, 4:09.

Second quarter

- CAR – Greg Olsen 37-yard pass from Cam Newton (Graham Gano kick), 2:14. Panthers 14–7. Drive: 3 plays, 46 yards, 1:16.
- CAR – Devin Funchess 14-yard pass from Cam Newton (Graham Gano kick), 0:15. Panthers 21–7. Drive: 9 plays, 72 yards, 1:09.

Third quarter

- CAR – Corey Brown 20-yard pass from Cam Newton (Graham Gano kick), 10:03. Panthers 28–7. Drive: 7 plays, 80 yards, 2:43.
- CAR – Ted Ginn Jr. 14-yard pass from Cam Newton (Graham Gano kick), 5:32. Panthers 35–7. Drive: 7 plays, 37 yards, 2:44.
- NYG – Will Tye 8-yard pass from Eli Manning (Josh Brown kick), 1:18. Panthers 35–14. Drive: 13 plays, 64 yards, 4:14.

Fourth quarter

- NYG – Rashad Jennings 38-yard run (Josh Brown kick), 13:24. Panthers 35–21. Drive: 4 plays, 66 yards, 1:17.
- NYG – Shane Vereen 8-yard pass from Eli Manning (Josh Brown kick), 5:27. Panthers 35–28. Drive: 3 plays, 14 yards, 1:16.
- NYG – Odell Beckham Jr. 14-yard pass from Eli Manning (Josh Brown kick), 1:46. Tied 35–35. Drive: 7 plays, 66 yards, 2:34.
- CAR – Graham Gano 43-yard field goal, 0:00. Panthers 38–35. Drive: 8 plays, 49 yards, 1:46.

Top passers

- CAR – Cam Newton – 25/45, 340 yards, 5 TD
- NYG – Eli Manning – 29/46, 245 yards, 4 TD, INT

Top rushers

- CAR – Cam Newton – 8 carries, 100 yards
- NYG – Rashad Jennings – 16 carries, 107 yards, TD

Top receivers

- CAR – Ted Ginn Jr. – 6 receptions, 85 yards, 2 TD
- NYG – Odell Beckham Jr. – 6 receptions, 76 yards, TD

Top tacklers

- CAR – Luke Kuechly – 15 tackles, 5 assists
- NYG – Landon Collins – 10 tackles, 2 assists

The Panthers looked to stay hot and undefeated as they traveled to MetLife Stadium to take on the Giants, led by two-time Super Bowl winning QB Eli Manning and star WR Odell Beckham Jr., who both had strong performances in a Monday Night shootout at Miami a week earlier. Much of the game was overshadowed by Beckham's and Josh Norman's melees throughout the game, which would lead to Beckham being suspended the following week and both players receiving fines. Carolina led 35–7 late in the third quarter, but the Manning-led Giants stormed back with four touchdowns (the last of which was a pass to Beckham) to tie the game with just under two minutes remaining. Carolina responded by putting together a quick drive that concluded with a game-winning field goal on the final play of regulation. With the last-second win, the Panthers moved to 14–0 and set a new record for the most wins to start a season by an NFC team. It also made them the fourth team, along with the 1972 Miami Dolphins, the 2007 New England Patriots, and the 2009 Indianapolis Colts to start a season 14–0 in NFL history.

==== Week 16: at Atlanta Falcons ====
Week Sixteen: Carolina Panthers at Atlanta Falcons – Game summary

| Quarter | 1 | 2 | 3 | 4 | Total |
|---|---|---|---|---|---|
| Panthers | 7 | 0 | 3 | 3 | 13 |
| Falcons | 0 | 7 | 7 | 6 | 20 |

at Georgia Dome, Atlanta, Georgia

- Date: December 27
- Game time: 1:00 pm. EST
- Game weather: Played indoors (dome stadium)
- Game attendance: 70,981
- Referee: John Parry
- TV announcers (Fox): Kevin Burkhardt, John Lynch and Pam Oliver
- Recap, Gamebook

Game information

First quarter

- CAR – Cam Newton 8-yard run (Graham Gano kick), 9:18. Panthers 7–0. Drive: 11 plays, 80 yards, 5:42.

Second quarter

- ATL – Devonta Freeman 4-yard run (Shayne Graham kick), 14:55. tied 7–7. Drive: 16 plays, 80 yards, 9:23.

Third quarter

- CAR – Graham Gano 33 yard field goal, 5:26. Panthers 10–7. Drive: 8 plays, 52 yards, 2:56.
- ATL – Julio Jones 70-yard pass from Matt Ryan (Shayne Graham kick), 2:12. Falcons 14–10. Drive: 5 plays, 80 yards, 3:14.

Fourth quarter

- CAR – Graham Gano 47 yard field goal, 7:59. Falcons 14–13. Drive: 4 plays, 7 yards, 1:28.
- ATL – Shayne Graham 37 yard field goal, 2:23. Falcons 17–13. Drive: 10 plays, 60 yards, 5:36.
- ATL – Shayne Graham 54 yard field goal, 1:30. Falcons 20–13. Drive: 4 plays, 1 yard, 0:18.

Top passers

- CAR – Cam Newton 17/30, 142 yards
- ATL – Matt Ryan 23/30, 306 yards, TD

Top rushers

- CAR – Cameron Artis-Payne 5 carries, 49 yards
- ATL – Devonta Freeman 22 carries, 73 yards, TD

Top receivers

- CAR – Greg Olsen 4 receptions, 40 yards
- ATL – Julio Jones 9 receptions, 178 yards, TD

The Panthers' undefeated season came to an end with a 13–20 loss in Atlanta, dropping their record to 14–1. Carolina started off well with a Newton rushing TD, but Atlanta proved to be too much at home, culminating in a long touchdown pass from Falcons QB Matt Ryan to WR Julio Jones. The Falcons defense swarmed the field all day, as the Panthers couldn't manage a touchdown for the rest of the game. As a result, Atlanta pulled off the upset. Despite the loss, their only one of the regular season, Carolina kept both its playoff spot and division title. It was also the Panthers' first regular season loss since November 30, 2014, when they were beaten 31–13 by the Minnesota Vikings.

==== Week 17: vs. Tampa Bay Buccaneers ====
Week Seventeen: Tampa Bay Buccaneers at Carolina Panthers – Game summary

| Quarter | 1 | 2 | 3 | 4 | Total |
|---|---|---|---|---|---|
| Buccaneers | 3 | 0 | 7 | 0 | 10 |
| Panthers | 0 | 24 | 7 | 7 | 38 |

at Bank of America Stadium, Charlotte, North Carolina

- Date: January 3, 2016
- Game time: 4:25 pm. EST
- Game weather: 54 °F (12 °C), partly cloudy
- Game attendance: 74,169
- Referee: Jerome Boger
- TV announcers (Fox): Dick Stockton, David Diehl and Kristina Pink
- Recap, Gamebook

Game information

First quarter

- TB – Connor Barth 39-yard field goal, 1:32. Buccaneers 3–0. Drive: 5 plays, 24 yards, 1:38.

Second quarter

- CAR – Cam Newton 1-yard run, (Graham Gano kick), 12:42. Panthers 7–3. Drive: 9 plays, 62 yards, 3:53.
- CAR – Graham Gano 49-yard field goal, 9:34. Panthers 10–3. Drive: 6 plays, 46 yards, 2:14.
- CAR – Cameron Artis-Payne 11-yard run, (Graham Gano kick), 4:23. Panthers 17–3. Drive: 7 plays, 46 yards, 4:15.
- CAR – Jerricho Cotchery 31-yard pass from Cam Newton, (Graham Gano kick), 2:00. Panthers 24–3. Drive: 3 plays, 49 yards, 0:51.

Third quarter

- CAR – Cam Newton 1-yard run, (Graham Gano kick), 9:21. Panthers 31–3. Drive: 2 plays, 3 yards, 0:43.
- TB – Jameis Winston 4-yard run, (Connor Barth kick), 4:53. Panthers 31–10. Drive: 9 plays, 82 yards, 4:33.

Fourth quarter

- CAR – Devin Funchess 16-yard pass from Cam Newton, (Graham Gano kick), 7:29. Panthers 38–10. Drive: 10 plays, 62 yards, 6:04.

Top passers

- TB – Jameis Winston – 29/49, 325 yards, 2 INT
- CAR – Cam Newton – 21/26, 293 yards, 2 TD

Top rushers

- TB – Doug Martin – 15 rushes, 48 yards
- CAR – Mike Tolbert – 10 rushes, 59 yards

Top receivers

- TB – Mike Evans – 4 rec, 99 yards
- CAR – Devin Funchess – 7 rec, 120 yards, TD

Top tacklers

- TB – Bruce Carter – 12 tackles, sack
- CAR – Cortland Finnegan – 5 tackles

The Panthers entered the day needing either a win against the Buccaneers, or an Arizona Cardinals loss to the Seahawks to secure the top seed in the NFC. Cam Newton tied former 49ers QB Steve Young for 43 career rushing touchdowns, the defense forced two interceptions from Bucs QB Jameis Winston and versatile special teams player Joe Webb (who also played backup QB and WR) recovered a fumbled punt return by Buccaneers RB Bobby Rainey. The Panthers capped off their best season in franchise history with a dominating win over Tampa Bay, finishing the regular season with a 15–1 record. It was both the most regular season wins ever recorded in franchise history and the best record in the NFL that year. With the win, the Panthers clinched home-field advantage throughout the NFC playoffs for the first time in franchise history, although the Cardinals' simultaneous loss to the Seahawks would've allowed Carolina to remain as the #1 seed either way.

=== Postseason ===
==== NFC Divisional Playoffs: vs. (6) Seattle Seahawks ====
NFC Divisional Playoffs: (6) Seattle Seahawks at (1) Carolina Panthers – Game summary

| Quarter | 1 | 2 | 3 | 4 | Total |
|---|---|---|---|---|---|
| Seahawks | 0 | 0 | 14 | 10 | 24 |
| Panthers | 14 | 17 | 0 | 0 | 31 |

at Bank of America Stadium, Charlotte, North Carolina

- Date: January 17, 2016
- Game time: 1:05 p.m. EST
- Game weather: 43 °F (6 °C), partly cloudy
- Game attendance: 74,287
- Referee: Tony Corrente
- TV announcers (Fox): Joe Buck, Troy Aikman, Erin Andrews and Chris Myers
- Recap, Gamebook

Game information

First quarter

- CAR 12:30 – Jonathan Stewart 4-yard rush (Graham Gano kick) Panthers 7–0
- CAR 11:38 – Luke Kuechly 14-yard interception return (Graham Gano kick) Panthers 14–0

Second quarter

- CAR 14:18 – Jonathan Stewart 1 yard rush (Graham Gano kick) Panthers 21–0
- CAR 12:37 – Graham Gano 48-yard field goal. Panthers 24–0
- CAR 6:25 – Greg Olsen 19-yard pass from Cam Newton (Graham Gano kick) Panthers 31–0

Third quarter

- SEA 13:27 – Jermaine Kearse 13-yard pass from Russell Wilson (Steven Hauschka kick) Panthers 31–7
- SEA 7:40 – Tyler Lockett 33-yard pass from Russell Wilson (Steven Hauschka kick) Panthers 31–14

Fourth quarter

- SEA 6:04 – Jermaine Kearse 3-yard pass from Russell Wilson (Steven Hauschka kick) Panthers 31–21
- SEA 1:12 – Steven Hauschka 36-yard field goal. Panthers 31–24

Top passers

- SEA –
- CAR –

Top rushers

- SEA –
- CAR –

Top receivers

- SEA –
- CAR –

Top tacklers

- SEA –
- CAR –

This playoff game was a rematch of 2014's divisional round game and the second meeting between the Panthers and Seahawks during the 2015–16 season. Tickets were sold out in under five minutes and all Panthers fans in attendance were given white towels to twirl, matching Carolina's all-white uniforms.

Carolina raced to a 31–0 halftime lead due to strong play on both sides of the ball, including a Kuechly pick-six. A couple of the Panthers' biggest offensive plays of the half were a long run by Jonathan Stewart to start the game and TE Greg Olsen's touchdown catch that was made with a defenders' arm in between Olsen's. The huge lead was only temporary, however, as the Seahawks scored 24 unanswered points in the second half and were a touchdown away from tying the game. The victory wasn't sealed for sure until Thomas Davis recovered an onside kick with 1:12 to play in regulation. The Panthers advanced to their fourth NFC Championship game in franchise history, their first NFC Championship appearance since 2005 and the first to be played at Bank of America Stadium. As of 2025, this remains the Panthers last Divisional Round win. This is also their most recent appearance in the Divisional Round.

==== NFC Championship: vs. (2) Arizona Cardinals ====
NFC Championship: (2) Arizona Cardinals at (1) Carolina Panthers – Game summary

| Quarter | 1 | 2 | 3 | 4 | Total |
|---|---|---|---|---|---|
| Cardinals | 0 | 7 | 0 | 8 | 15 |
| Panthers | 17 | 7 | 10 | 15 | 49 |

at Bank of America Stadium, Charlotte, North Carolina

- Date: January 24, 2016
- Game time: 6:40 pm. EST
- Game weather: 39 °F (4 °C), clear
- Game attendance: 74,294
- Referee: Bill Vinovich
- TV announcers (Fox): Joe Buck, Troy Aikman, Erin Andrews and Chris Myers
- Recap, Gamebook

Game information

First quarter

- CAR – 3:56 Graham Gano 45-yard field goal Panthers 3–0
- CAR – 4:31 Ted Ginn Jr. 22-yard rush (Graham Gano kick) Panthers 10–0
- CAR – 0:49 Corey Brown 89-yard pass from Cam Newton (Graham Gano kick) Panthers 17–0

Second quarter

- ARI – 5:44 David Johnson 1 yard rush (Chandler Catanzaro kick) Panthers 17–7
- CAR – 1:56 Cam Newton 1 yard rush (Graham Gano kick) Panthers 24–7

Third quarter

- CAR – 7:50 Graham Gano 21-yard field goal Panthers 27–7
- CAR – 2:08 Cam Newton 12-yard rush (Graham Gano kick) Panthers 34–7

Fourth quarter

- ARI – 14:16 Darren Fells 21-yard pass from Carson Palmer (Two point conversion successful) Panthers 34–15
- CAR – Devin Funchess 5-yard pass from Cam Newton (Two point conversion successful) Panthers 42–15
- CAR – Luke Kuechly 22-yard interception return (Graham Gano kick) Panthers 49–15

Top passers

- ARI – Carson Palmer – 23/40, 235 yards, 1 TD, 4 INT
- CAR – Cam Newton – 19/28, 335 yards, 2 TD, 1 INT

Top rushers

- ARI – David Johnson – 15 rushes, 60 yards
- CAR – Jonathan Stewart – 19 rushes, 83 yards

Top receivers

- ARI – David Johnson – 9 rec, 68 yards
- CAR – Corey Brown – 4 rec, 113 yards, 1 TD

Top tacklers

- ARI – Tony Jefferson – 11 tackles, 5 solo
- CAR – Luke Kuechly – 8 tackles, 3 solo, 1 INT, 1 TD

Bank of America Stadium was open earlier than usual due to the recent winter weather around the region, allowing some fans to see the ending of the AFC Championship game, since it was broadcast on the stadium's video boards.

Less than four hours later, with another sold-out crowd mostly wearing a mix of black and blue, the Carolina Panthers routed the Arizona Cardinals by a score of 49–15 en route to Super Bowl 50. The Panthers forced seven turnovers from the Cardinals, six from QB Carson Palmer and one from cornerback Patrick Peterson on a punt return, despite losing Thomas Davis to an arm injury early. Offensively, Cam Newton threw two touchdown passes and ran for another pair. Linebacker Luke Kuechly had both his third pick-six of the year and pick-sixes in consecutive playoff games, while safety Kurt Coleman had two red zone interceptions. Coleman's first pick came the play after Peterson picked off a Newton pass. The Panthers also out gained the Cardinals in total yardage 476–287. In the aftermath of Kuechly's pick-six, with the victory fully secured, the stadium itself began shaking due to the crowd noise and energy. This was noticed on air by Fox Sports' Joe Buck, who, after the cameras showed almost thirty seconds of exuberant Panthers fans dancing in the stands, stated: "This booth is literally bouncing."

With the blowout win, the Panthers would improve to 17–1 overall and would head onto the Super Bowl, their first appearance in twelve years and their second in franchise history. They would become the first 15–1 team to do so since the 1985 Bears. The win also made Rivera the fifth minority and the second Latino head coach to lead a team to the Super Bowl, the first being Tom Flores who'd lead the Raiders to Super Bowl XVIII. Coincidentally, Rivera was a linebacker for the Chicago Bears when they won Super Bowl XX. As of 2025, this remains the Panthers last playoff win. In addition, this also marks the Panthers most recent appearance in the NFC Championship game.

==== Super Bowl 50: vs. (A1) Denver Broncos ====
Super Bowl 50: (N1) Carolina Panthers vs. (A1) Denver Broncos – Game summary

| Quarter | 1 | 2 | 3 | 4 | Total |
|---|---|---|---|---|---|
| Panthers | 0 | 7 | 0 | 3 | 10 |
| Broncos | 10 | 3 | 3 | 8 | 24 |

at Levi's Stadium, Santa Clara, California

- Date: February 7, 2016
- Game time: 6:30 pm. EST/3:30 p.m. PST
- Game weather: 76 °F (24 °C), sunny
- Game attendance: 71,088
- Referee: Clete Blakeman
- TV announcers (CBS): Jim Nantz, Phil Simms, Evan Washburn and Tracy Wolfson
- Recap, Gamebook

Game information

First quarter

Second quarter

Third quarter

Fourth quarter

Top passers

- CAR –
- DEN –

Top rushers

- CAR –
- DEN –

Top receivers

- CAR –
- DEN –

Top tacklers

- CAR –
- DEN –

Despite out gaining the Broncos 315–194 and having 21 first downs compared to Denver's 11, Carolina lost to Denver in Super Bowl 50. Carolina's defense played well, allowing only one offensive touchdown, which was aided by a Panthers' turnover in the red zone. Carolina ultimately committed 4 costly turnovers though, including two strip sacks from QB Cam Newton, one of which immediately resulted in a touchdown for the Denver Broncos. Newton finished the game completing 18 of 41 passes for 265 yards with one interception, rushed six times for 45 yards and was sacked a career-high nine times. The Carolina Panthers finished with a 17–2 overall record.

== Standings ==
=== Division ===
NFC South
| | W | L | T | PCT | DIV | CONF | PF | PA | STK |
|---|---|---|---|---|---|---|---|---|---|
| ^{(1)} Carolina Panthers | 15 | 1 | 0 | .938 | 5–1 | 11–1 | 500 | 308 | W1 |
| Atlanta Falcons | 8 | 8 | 0 | .500 | 1–5 | 5–7 | 339 | 345 | L1 |
| New Orleans Saints | 7 | 9 | 0 | .438 | 3–3 | 5–7 | 408 | 476 | W2 |
| Tampa Bay Buccaneers | 6 | 10 | 0 | .375 | 3–3 | 5–7 | 342 | 417 | L4 |

=== Conference ===
NFC
| # | Team | Division | W | L | T | PCT | DIV | CONF | SOS | SOV | STK |
|---|---|---|---|---|---|---|---|---|---|---|---|
Division Leaders
| 1 | Carolina Panthers | South | 15 | 1 | 0 | .938 | 5–1 | 11–1 | .441 | .438 | W1 |
| 2 | Arizona Cardinals | West | 13 | 3 | 0 | .813 | 4–2 | 10–2 | .477 | .457 | L1 |
| 3 | Minnesota Vikings | North | 11 | 5 | 0 | .688 | 5–1 | 8–4 | .504 | .449 | W3 |
| 4 | Washington Redskins | East | 9 | 7 | 0 | .563 | 4–2 | 8–4 | .465 | .403 | W4 |
Wild Cards
| 5 (Note: Green Bay finished ahead of Seattle based on head-to-head victory.) | Green Bay Packers | North | 10 | 6 | 0 | .625 | 3–3 | 7–5 | .531 | .450 | L2 |
| 6 | Seattle Seahawks | West | 10 | 6 | 0 | .625 | 3–3 | 7–5 | .520 | .431 | W1 |
Did not qualify for the postseason
| 7 | Atlanta Falcons | South | 8 | 8 | 0 | .500 | 1–5 | 5–7 | .480 | .453 | L1 |
| 8 (Note: St. Louis and Detroit finished ahead of Philadelphia and New Orleans based on conference record. St. Louis finished ahead of Detroit based on head-to-head victory. Detroit finished ahead of Philadelphia and New Orleans based on head-to-head sweep, while Philadelphia finished ahead of New Orleans based on head-to-head victory.) | St. Louis Rams | West | 7 | 9 | 0 | .438 | 4–2 | 6–6 | .527 | .482 | L1 |
| 9 | Detroit Lions | North | 7 | 9 | 0 | .438 | 3–3 | 6–6 | .535 | .429 | W3 |
| 10 | Philadelphia Eagles | East | 7 | 9 | 0 | .438 | 3–3 | 4–8 | .508 | .473 | W1 |
| 11 | New Orleans Saints | South | 7 | 9 | 0 | .438 | 3–3 | 5–7 | .504 | .402 | W2 |
| 12 (Note: The New York Giants and Chicago each finished ahead of Tampa Bay based on head-to-head victory, while the Giants finished ahead of Chicago based on conference record.) | New York Giants | East | 6 | 10 | 0 | .375 | 2–4 | 4–8 | .500 | .396 | L3 |
| 13 | Chicago Bears | North | 6 | 10 | 0 | .375 | 1–5 | 3–9 | .547 | .469 | L1 |
| 14 | Tampa Bay Buccaneers | South | 6 | 10 | 0 | .375 | 3–3 | 5–7 | .484 | .406 | L4 |
| 15 | San Francisco 49ers | West | 5 | 11 | 0 | .313 | 1–5 | 4–8 | .539 | .463 | W1 |
| 16 | Dallas Cowboys | East | 4 | 12 | 0 | .250 | 3–3 | 3–9 | .531 | .438 | L4 |
Tiebreakers (Note: When breaking ties for three or more teams under the NFL's rules, they are first broken within divisions, then comparing only the highest-ranked remaining team from each division.)
