= Corey Brown (American football) =

American football player (born 1991)

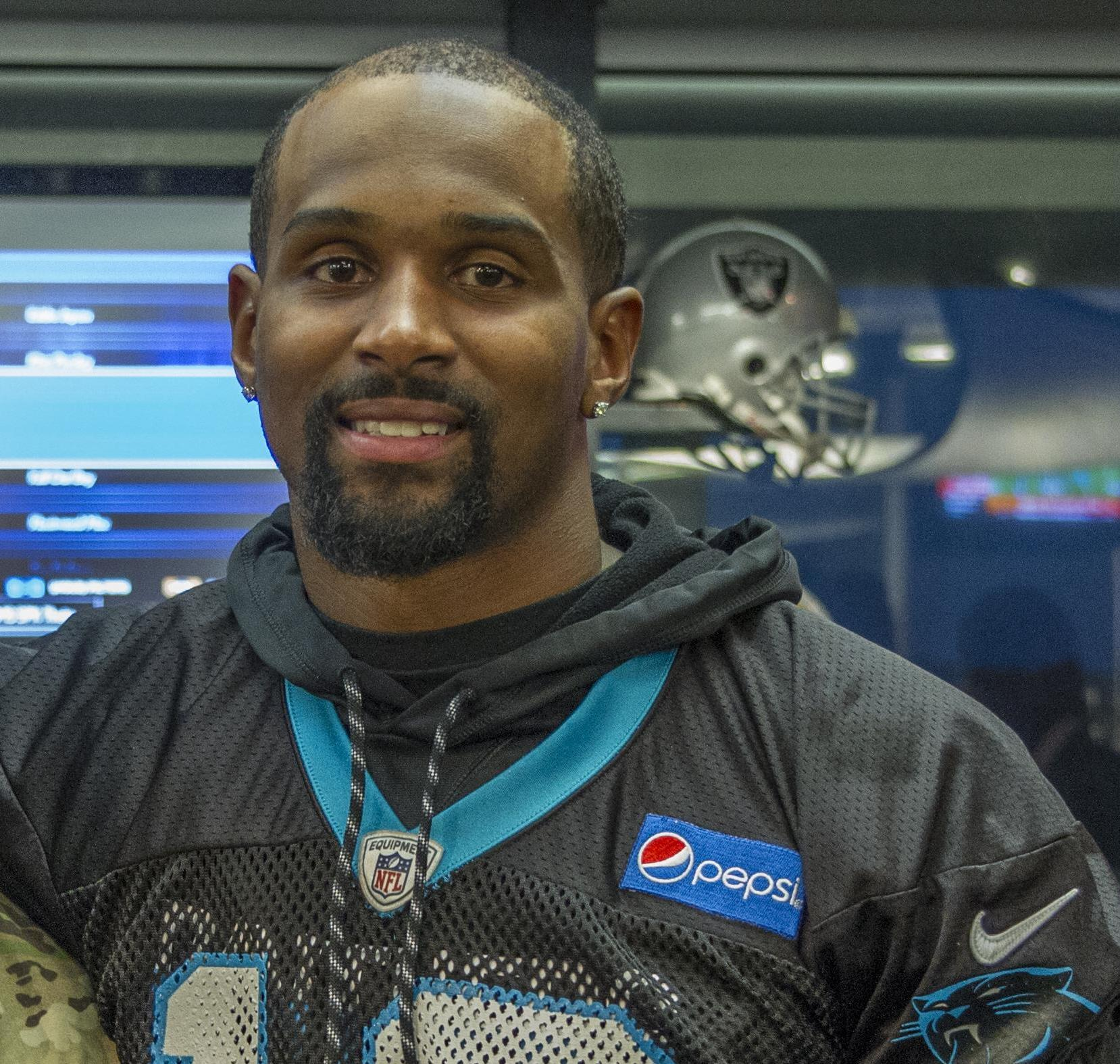
- Brown with the Carolina Panthers in 2016

No. 16, 10
- Positions: Wide receiver, return specialist

Personal information
- Born: December 16, 1991 (age 34); Philadelphia, Pennsylvania, U.S.
- Listed height: 5 ft 11 in (1.80 m)
- Listed weight: 190 lb (86 kg)

Career information
- High school: Cardinal O'Hara (Springfield, Pennsylvania)
- College: Ohio State (2010–2013)
- NFL draft: 2014: undrafted

Career history
- Carolina Panthers (2014–2016); Buffalo Bills (2017); Denver Broncos (2018)*
- * Offseason or practice squad member only

Awards and highlights
- 2× Second-team All-Big Ten Conference (2012, 2013)

Career NFL statistics
- Receptions: 79
- Receiving yards: 1,019
- Receiving touchdowns: 7
- Rushing yards: 139
- Return yards: 426
- Return touchdowns: 1
- Stats at Pro Football Reference

Corey Phillip "Philly" Brown (born December 16, 1991) is an American former professional football player who was a wide receiver and return specialist in the National Football League (NFL). He played college football for the Ohio State Buckeyes. He was signed by the Panthers as an undrafted free agent in 2014.

== Early life ==
While attending Cardinal O'Hara High School in Springfield, Pennsylvania, Brown was one of the state's top performers in the sprinting events, with personal-bests of 10.54 seconds in the 100-meter dash and 21.18 seconds in the 200-meter dash.

== College career ==
Brown played college football at Ohio State University from 2010 to 2013. In his four-year career at Ohio State, he started 35 of 48 games and recorded 145 receptions for 1,750 yards and 15 touchdowns.

== Professional career ==
Pre-draft measurables
Height	Weight	Arm length	Hand span	Wingspan	40-yard dash	10-yard split	20-yard split	20-yard shuttle	Three-cone drill	Vertical jump	Broad jump
5 ft 11 3/8 in (1.81 m)	178 lb (81 kg)	31 3/4 in (0.81 m)	9 3/8 in (0.24 m)	6 ft 4 1/2 in (1.94 m)	4.51 s	1.59 s	2.65 s	4.22 s	7.16 s	33 in (0.84 m)	10 ft 3 in (3.12 m)
All values from NFL Combine/Pro Day

=== Carolina Panthers ===
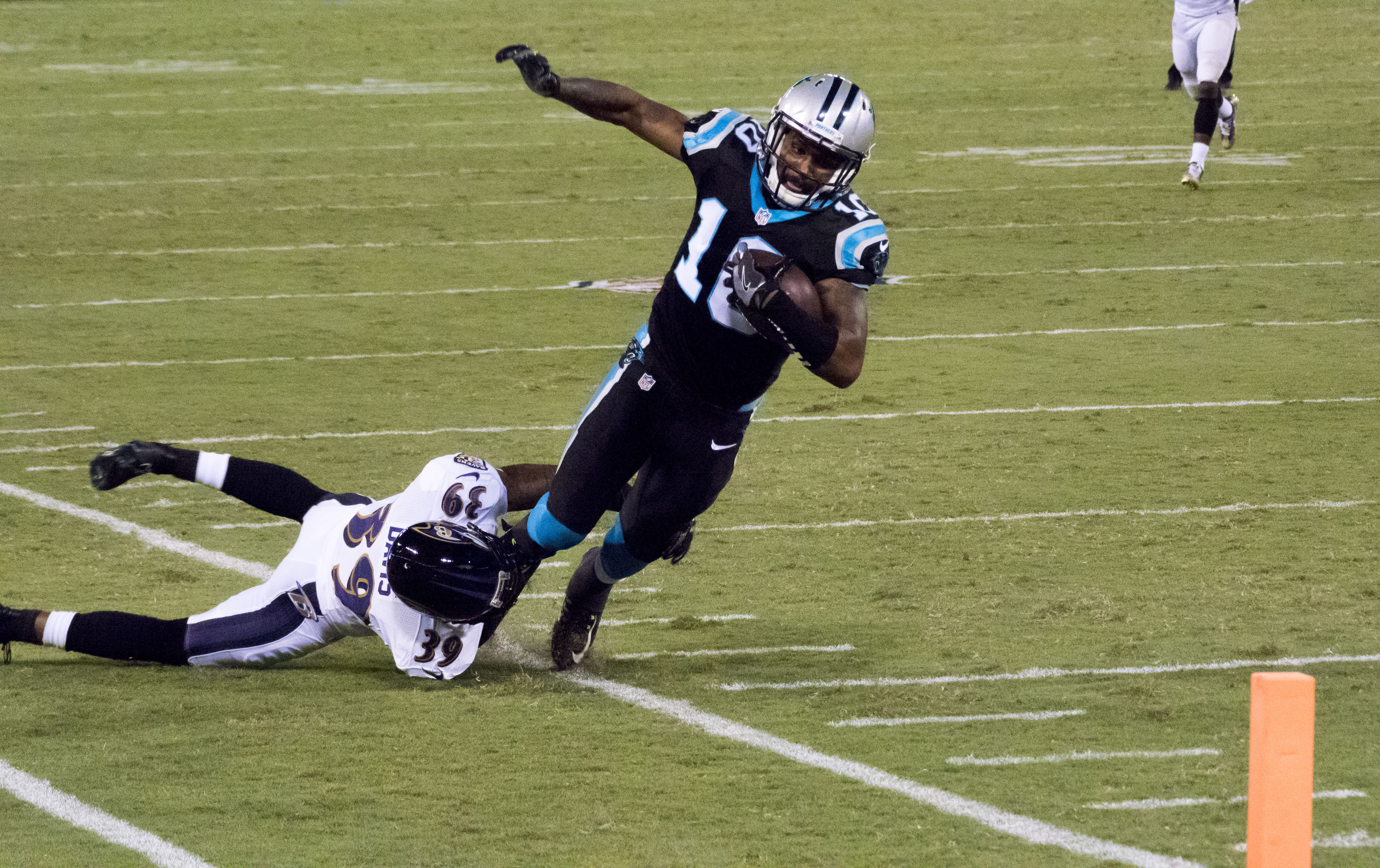
Brown playing against the Baltimore Ravens in 2016.

Brown was signed by the Carolina Panthers after going undrafted in the 2014 NFL draft. On October 5, 2014, Brown recorded the first punt return touchdown for the Panthers since Steve Smith, Sr. in 2003 on a 79-yard touchdown return. In Week 11, against the Atlanta Falcons, Brown recorded his first receiving touchdown as an NFL player. Brown appeared in 13 games and had three starts in 2014. He had 21 receptions for 296 receiving yards and two receiving touchdowns as a rookie.

In Brown's second season, the Panthers finished the season with a franchise-record 15–1 season. On the year, Brown had 31 catches for 447 yards and four touchdowns.

In the NFC Championship against the Arizona Cardinals, he had four receptions for 113 receiving yards and one receiving touchdown in the 49–15 victory. On February 7, 2016, Brown was part of the Panthers team that played in Super Bowl 50. In the game, the Panthers fell to the Denver Broncos by a score of 24–10. In the Super Bowl, Brown had four catches for 80 yards, and was the Panthers' leading receiver in the game in terms of total receiving yards.

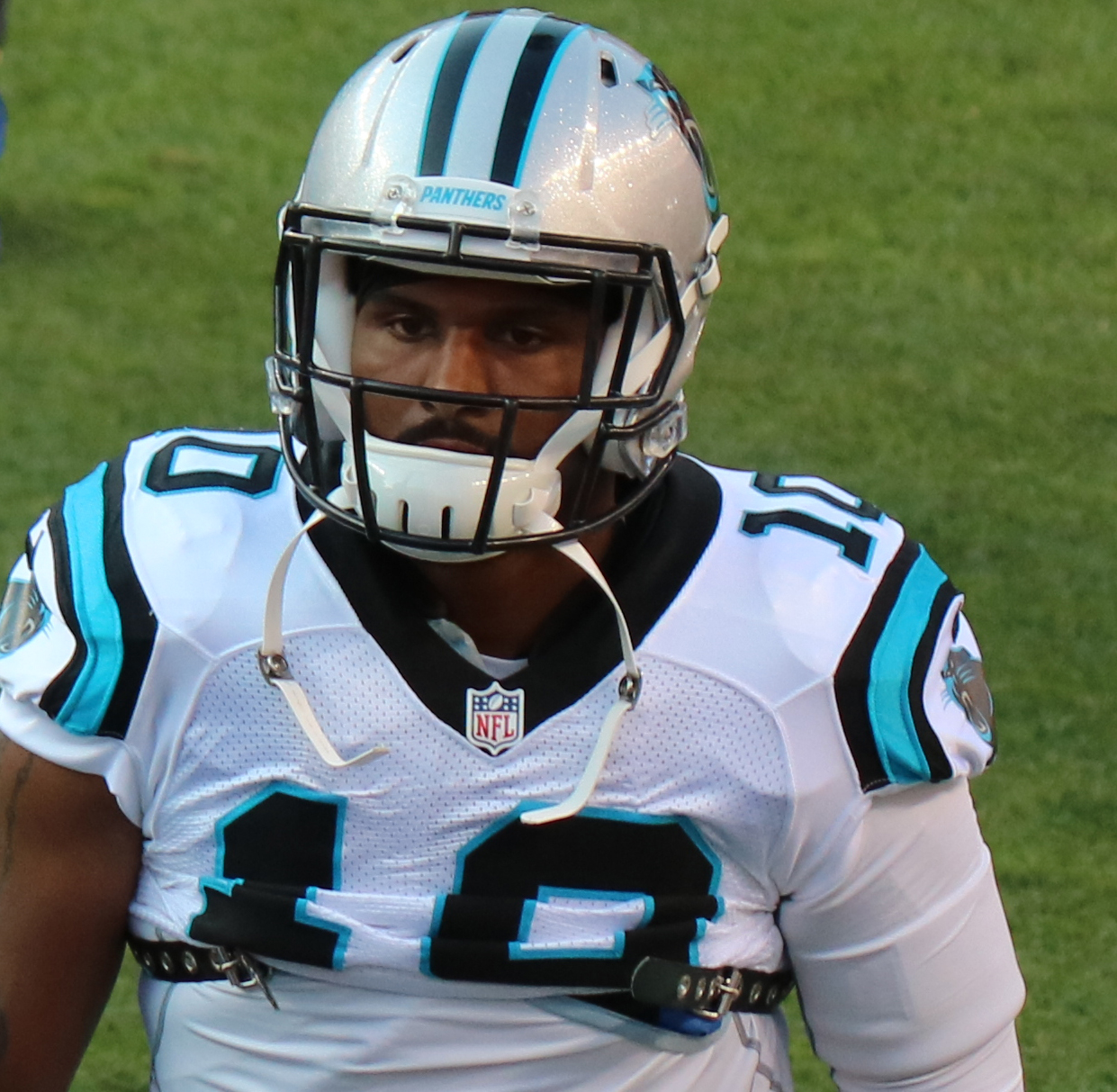
Brown with the Panthers in 2016

In the 2016 season, Brown recorded 27 receptions for 276 receiving yards and one receiving touchdown in 16 games, of which he started eight.

=== Buffalo Bills ===
On March 12, 2017, Brown signed a one-year contract with the Buffalo Bills. He was released on September 3, 2017. He was re-signed on October 3, 2017, but was released four days later.

=== Denver Broncos ===
On July 27, 2018, Brown signed with the Denver Broncos. He was waived/injured by the Broncos on August 15, 2018, and was placed on injured reserve.

== Career statistics ==
=== NFL ===
==== Regular season ====
Year	Team	GP	GS	Receiving					Rushing					Fumbles	
Year	Team	GP	GS	Rec	Yds	Avg	Lng	TD	Att	Yds	Avg	Lng	TD	Fum	Lost
2014	CAR	13	3	21	296	14.1	47T	2	8	95	11.9	28	0	3	1
2015	CAR	14	11	31	447	14.4	39T	4	6	38	6.3	14	0	0	0
2016	CAR	16	8	27	276	10.2	27	1	2	6	3.0	9	0	1	1
Career		43	22	79	1019	12.9	47	7	16	139	8.7	28	0	4	2

==== Postseason ====
Year	Team	GP	GS	Receiving				
Year	Team	GP	GS	Rec	Yds	Avg	Lng	TD
2014	CAR	2	1	5	61	12.2	23	1
2015	CAR	3	1	10	215	21.5	86	1
Career		5	2	15	276	16.9	86	1

=== College ===
Year	G	Receiving			
Year	G	Rec	Yds	TD	Avg
2010	13	8	105	1	13.1
2011	13	14	205	1	14.6
2012	12	60	669	3	11.2
2013	14	63	771	10	12.2
Career	52	145	1,750	15	12.1
