= 2008 All-SEC football team =

American college football all-star team

The 2008 All-SEC football team consists of American football players selected to the All-Southeastern Conference (SEC) chosen by the Associated Press (AP) and the conference coaches for the 2008 college football season.

The Florida Gators won the conference, beating the Alabama Crimson Tide 31 to 20 in the SEC Championship game. The Gators then won a national championship, defeating the Big 12 champion Oklahoma Sooners 24 to 14 in the 2009 BCS National Championship Game. Alabama led the conference with five consensus first-team All-SEC selections by both the AP and the coaches; Florida was second with three.

Florida quarterback Tim Tebow, a unanimous AP selection, was voted AP SEC Offensive Player of the Year. Georgia running back Knowshon Moreno was a unanimous selection by both AP and the coaches. Tennessee safety Eric Berry, a unanimous selection by the coaches, was voted AP SEC Defensive Player of the Year.

== Offensive selections ==
=== Quarterbacks ===
- Tim Tebow*, Florida (AP-1, Coaches-1)
- Matthew Stafford, Georgia (AP-2, Coaches-2)

=== Running backs ===
- Knowshon Moreno†, Georgia (AP-1, Coaches-1)
- Glen Coffee, Alabama (AP-1, Coaches-2)
- Charles Scott, LSU (AP-2, Coaches-1)
- Michael Smith, Arkansas (AP-2, Coaches-2)

=== Wide receivers ===
- A. J. Green, Georgia (AP-1, Coaches-2)
- Percy Harvin, Florida (AP-2, Coaches-1)
- Mohamed Massaquoi, Georgia (AP-2, Coaches-1)
- Brandon LaFell, LSU (AP-1)
- Julio Jones, Alabama (AP-2, Coaches-2)

=== Centers ===
- Antoine Caldwell, Alabama (AP-1, Coaches-1)
- Jonathan Luigs, Arkansas (AP-2, Coaches-2)

=== Guards ===
- Herman Johnson, LSU (AP-1, Coaches-1)
- Clint Boling, Georgia (AP-1)
- Mike Johnson, Alabama (AP-2, Coaches-2)
- Mike Pouncey, Florida (Coaches-2)

=== Tackles ===
- Michael Oher*, Ole Miss (AP-1, Coaches-1)
- Andre Smith*, Alabama (AP-1, Coaches-1)
- Phil Trautwein, Florida (AP-1, Coaches-1)
- Ciron Black, LSU (AP-2, Coaches-2)
- Garry Williams, Kentucky (AP-2, Coaches-2)
- Anthony Parker, Tennessee (AP-2, Coaches-2)
- John Jerry, Ole Miss (Coaches-2)

=== Tight ends ===
- D. J. Williams, Arkansas (AP-1, Coaches-2)
- Jared Cook, South Carolina (AP-2)
- Richard Dickson, LSU (Coaches-2)

== Defensive selections ==
=== Defensive ends ===
- Antonio Coleman, Auburn (AP-1, Coaches-1)
- Robert Ayers, Tennessee (AP-2, Coaches-1)
- Rahim Allen, LSU (AP-1)
- Jermaine Cunningham, Florida (AP-2)
- Carlos Dunlap, Florida (AP-2)
- Greg Hardy, Ole Miss (Coaches-2)

=== Defensive tackles ===
- Terrence Cody, Alabama (AP-1, Coaches-1)
- Peria Jerry, Ole Miss (AP-1, Coaches-1)
- Myron Pryor, Kentucky (AP-2, Coaches-2)
- Malcolm Sheppard, Arkansas (AP-2, Coaches-2)
- SenDerrick Marks, Auburn (Coaches-2)

=== Linebackers ===
- Brandon Spikes*, Florida (AP-1, Coaches-1)
- Rolando McClain, Alabama (AP-1, Coaches-1)
- Eric Norwood, South Carolina (AP-1, Coaches-1)
- Rennie Curran, Georgia (AP-2, Coaches-1)
- Micah Johnson, Kentucky (Coaches-1)
- Dominic Douglas, Miss. St. (AP-2, Coaches-2)
- Patrick Benoist, Vanderbilt (AP-2, Coaches-2)
- Darry Beckwith, LSU (AP-2)
- Jasper Brinkley, South Carolina (Coaches-2)
- Rico McCoy, Tennessee (Coaches-2)

=== Cornerbacks ===
- Trevard Lindley, Kentucky (AP-1, Coaches-1)
- D. J. Moore, Vanderbilt (AP-1, Coaches-1)
- Javier Arenas, Alabama (AP-2, Coaches-2)
- Joe Haden, Florida (AP-2, Coaches-2)

=== Safeties ===
- Rashad Johnson*, Alabama (AP-1, Coaches-1)
- Eric Berry#, Tennessee (AP-1, Coaches-1)
- Emanuel Cook, South Carolina (AP-2, Coaches-2)
- Reshad Jones, Georgia (AP-2)
- Ahmad Black, Florida (Coaches-2)
- Derek Pegues, Miss. St. (Coaches-2)

== Special teams ==
=== Kickers ===
- Joshua Shene, Ole Miss (AP-1, Coaches-2)
- Colt David, LSU (AP-2, Coaches-1)

=== Punters ===
- Tim Masthay, Kentucky (AP-1, Coaches-1)
- Brian Mimbs, Ole Miss (AP-2, Coaches-2)
- Jeremy Davis, Arkansas (AP-2)
- Chas Henry, Florida (Coaches-2)

=== All purpose/return specialist ===
- Percy Harvin, Florida (AP-1)
- Dexter McCluster, Ole Miss (AP-2)
- Brandon James, Florida (Coaches-1)
- Javier Arenas, Alabama (Coaches-2)

== Key ==
Bold = Consensus first-team selection by both the coaches and AP

AP = Associated Press

Coaches = Selected by the SEC coaches

* = Unanimous selection of AP

# = Unanimous selection of Coaches

† = Unanimous selection of both AP and Coaches

== See also ==
- 2008 College Football All-America Team
