= Brandon James =

American football player (born 1987)

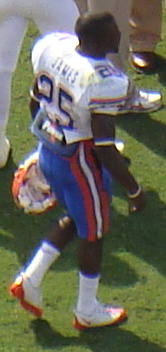
- James with the Florida Gators in 2008

No. 12
- Position: Wide receiver / Return specialist

Personal information
- Born: December 21, 1987 (age 38); St. Augustine, Florida, U.S.
- Listed height: 5 ft 7 in (1.70 m)
- Listed weight: 186 lb (84 kg)

Career information
- High school: St. Augustine
- College: Florida (2006–2009)
- NFL draft: 2010: undrafted

Career history
- Indianapolis Colts (2010); Edmonton Eskimos (2011)

Awards and highlights
- BCS national champion (2006, 2008); Consensus All-American (2008); SEC Special Teams Player of the Year (2008); First-team All-SEC (2008); Second-team All-SEC (2007)

Career NFL statistics
- Receptions: 6
- Receiving yards: 40
- Return yards: 264
- Stats at Pro Football Reference

Brandon Keith James (born December 21, 1987) is an American former professional football player who was a wide receiver and kick returner in the National Football League (NFL) and Canadian Football League (CFL). He played college football for the Florida Gators, earning consensus All-American honors and winning two BCS National Championships with the Gators. Thereafter, he played professionally for the Indianapolis Colts of the NFL and the Edmonton Eskimos of the CFL.

== Early life ==
James was born in St. Augustine, Florida in 1987. He attended St. Augustine High School, where he was a standout running back for the St. Augustine Yellow Jackets high school football team. As a senior team captain in 2005, James ran for 900 yards and eight touchdowns while leading the Yellow Jackets to a Florida Class 3A state championship.

== College career ==
James received an athletic scholarship to attend the University of Florida in Gainesville, Florida, where he played for coach Urban Meyer's Florida Gators football team from 2006 to 2009. As a freshman in 2006, James saw immediate playing time as a kick return specialist, returning 33 punts for 363 yards and one touchdown in 2006, and earning Freshman All-Southeastern Conference (SEC) and Freshman All-American honors. His 33-yard kickoff return against the Ohio State Buckeyes in the 2007 BCS National Championship Game gave the Gators the ball in Buckeye territory after Ohio State's Ted Ginn Jr. opened the game with a kickoff return for a touchdown. James's dramatic return and the Gators' resulting touchdown changed the early momentum of the game, with the Gators ultimately defeating the top-ranked Buckeyes 41–14 to win the BCS National Championship.

James led the Gators in kickoff and punt return yardage for four consecutive seasons, and finished his college career with 4,770 total yards gained, including 112 kickoff returns for 2,718 yards and a touchdown, 117 punt returns for 1,371 yards and four touchdowns, 379 receiving yards and 302 rushing yards. His career kickoff return yardage and combined kick return yardage remain SEC records. He was a first-team All-American in 2007, a consensus first-team All-American in 2008, a first-team All-SEC selection in 2008, the SEC Special Teams Player of the Year in 2008, and a senior team captain in 2009. During his time as a Gator, the team won two SEC Championship Games (2006, 2008) and two BCS National Championship Games (2007, 2009).

James graduated from the University of Florida with a bachelor's degree in sociology in 2010.

		Return Stats
Season	Punt returns	Yards	Touchdowns	Fair Catches	Long	Kick returns	Yards	Touchdowns	Fair Catches	Long
2006	40	363	1	7	77	21	383	0	0	33
2007	16	254	1	2	83	30	841	0	0	61
2008	46	510	2	8	78	32	738	0	0	52
2009	44	244	0	11	49	29	756	1	0	85

=== Track and field ===
James was also a member of the Florida Gators track and field team, competing at the SEC Outdoor Championships. His personal bests are 10.43 seconds in the 100 meters and 21.00 seconds in the 200 meters.

==== Personal bests ====
Event	Time (seconds)	Venue	Date
100 meters	10.43	Austin, Texas	April 9, 2005
200 meters	21.00	Austin, Texas	March 12, 2005

== Professional career ==
The Indianapolis Colts signed James as an undrafted free agent on April 30, 2010. On November 10, James was activated from the practice squad to the main roster. On November 28, 2010, James posted 150 kick return yards and 29 punt return yards. He was released the following week from the Colts active roster.

In 2011, the Edmonton Eskimos signed James as a free agent, but he was later released during the regular season, bringing his playing career to an end.

== Coaching career ==
In 2012, James was hired to coach the football team at St. Joseph Academy in St. Augustine. He was fired after one season in which the team went 2-8.

== See also ==
- 2006 Florida Gators football team
- 2007 College Football All-America Team
- 2008 College Football All-America Team
- 2008 Florida Gators football team
- List of Florida Gators football All-Americans
- List of SEC Most Valuable Players
- List of University of Florida alumni
