= Phil Trautwein =

American football player and coach (born 1986)

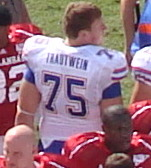
- Trautwein with the Florida Gators in 2008

Florida Gators
- Title: Offensive line coach

Personal information
- Born: April 16, 1986 (age 40); Voorhees Township, New Jersey, U.S.
- Listed height: 6 ft 6 in (1.98 m)
- Listed weight: 308 lb (140 kg)

Career information
- High school: Eastern Regional (Voorhees Township, New Jersey)
- College: Florida
- NFL draft: 2009: undrafted

Career history

Playing
- St. Louis Rams (2009)*; Cleveland Browns (2009); St. Louis Rams (2009); Cleveland Browns (2010–2011)*; New Orleans Saints (2011–2012)*; San Diego Chargers (2012)*
- * Offseason or practice squad member only

Coaching
- Boston College (2013–2015) Graduate assistant; Davidson (2016–2017) Special teams coordinator & tight ends coach; Boston College (2018–2019) Offensive line coach; Penn State (2020–2025) Offensive line coach; Florida (2026–present) Offensive line coach

Awards and highlights
- 2× BCS national champion (2006, 2008); First-team All-SEC (2008); Second-team All-SEC (2006)

Career NFL statistics
- Games played: 4
- Stats at Pro Football Reference

Phillip Charles Trautwein (born April 16, 1986) is an American former professional football offensive tackle who is the current offensive line coach for the Florida Gators. Trautwein played college football for the University of Florida and was a member of two BCS National Championship teams. Professionally, he was a member of the St. Louis Rams, Cleveland Browns, New Orleans Saints, and San Diego Chargers.

== Early life ==
Trautwein was born and raised in Voorhees Township, New Jersey. He attended Eastern Regional High School in Voorhees Township, and he played for the Eastern Vikings high school football team. Trautwein earned second-team all-conference football honors following his junior season. He also excelled in wrestling, and graduated with a 3.7 gradepoint average in 2004.

== College career ==
Trautwein accepted an athletic scholarship to attend the University of Florida in Gainesville, Florida, where he played for coach Ron Zook and coach Urban Meyer's Florida Gators football teams from 2004 to 2008. As a freshman in 2004, Trautwein was a reserve offensive tackle seeing action in six games. The next season, 2005, he played in all twelve games, making his first career start as a tight end against Florida State. Following the 2006, he was named to the Southeastern Conference (SEC) Fall Academic Honor Roll and received second-team All-SEC honors after starting all fourteen games for the Gators at left tackle. He sat out the 2007 season with a stress fracture in his foot. As a senior in 2008, he started all twelve games at left tackle and was a first-team All-SEC selection at tackle for the second time in two years; both seasons he was All-SEC, the Gators were the consensus BCS Champions. Trautwein graduated from Florida with a bachelor's degree in 2007 and a master's degree in 2008.

== Professional career ==
Pre-draft measurables
Height	Weight	40-yard dash	10-yard split	20-yard split	Vertical jump	Broad jump	Bench press
6 ft 5 3/4 in (1.97 m)	308 lb (140 kg)	5.36 s	1.84 s	3.00 s	27 in (0.69 m)	8 ft 3 in (2.51 m)	23 reps
All values from Pro Day.

=== St. Louis Rams (first stint) ===
On April 27, 2009, Trautwein was signed by the St. Louis Rams as an undrafted free agent. On June 12, 2009 Trautwein's younger sister, Sarah, died in a car accident. On August 5, 2009 Trautwein was waived by the Rams.

=== Cleveland Browns ===
On August 6, 2009, Trautwein was claimed off of waivers by the Cleveland Browns. On October 7, 2009 Trautwein was waived by the Cleveland Browns.

=== St. Louis Rams (second stint) ===
The Rams signed Trautwein to their 53-man roster in October 2009 after being waived by the Browns. On September 5, 2011, he was released with an injury settlement.

=== New Orleans Saints ===
The New Orleans Saints signed Trautwein to their practice squad on November 23, 2011. Phil Trautwein was re-signed on January 18, 2012.

=== San Diego Chargers ===
On May 29, 2012, Trautwein was signed by the San Diego Chargers. On August 27, 2012, he was released by the Chargers.

== See also ==
- List of University of Florida alumni
- List of St. Louis Rams players
