= Brandon Spikes =

American football player (born 1987)

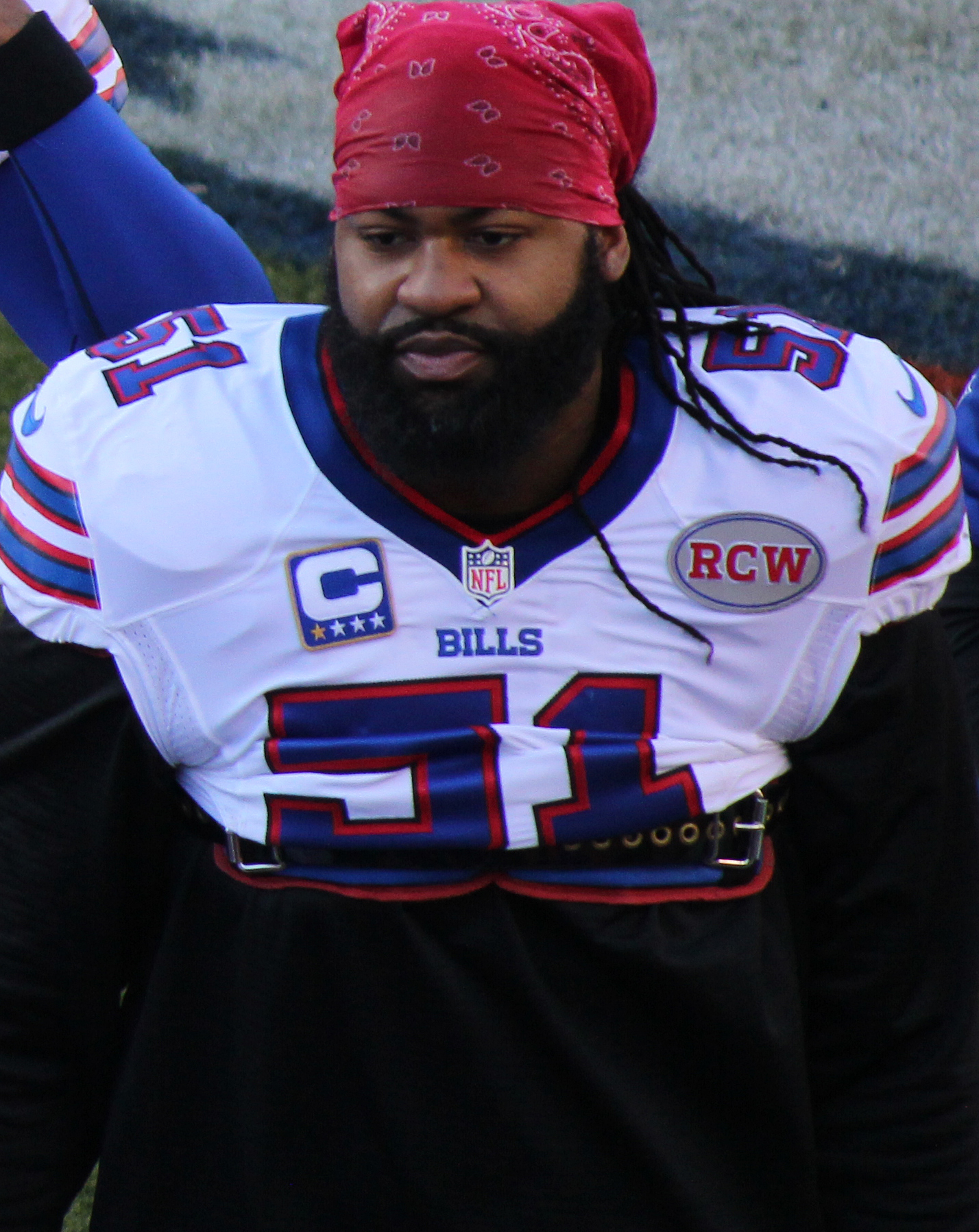
- Spikes with the Buffalo Bills in 2014

No. 55, 51
- Position: Linebacker

Personal information
- Born: September 3, 1987 (age 39); Shelby, North Carolina, U.S.
- Listed height: 6 ft 3 in (1.91 m)
- Listed weight: 255 lb (116 kg)

Career information
- High school: Crest (Shelby)
- College: Florida (2006–2009)
- NFL draft: 2010: 2nd round, 62nd overall pick

Career history
- New England Patriots (2010–2013); Buffalo Bills (2014); New England Patriots (2015)*; Buffalo Bills (2016)
- * Offseason or practice squad member only

Awards and highlights
- 2× BCS national champion (2006, 2008); Unanimous All-American (2008); Consensus All-American (2009); 3× First-team All-SEC (2007–2009)

Career NFL statistics
- Total tackles: 349
- Sacks: 2.0
- Forced fumbles: 6
- Fumble recoveries: 1
- Interceptions: 2
- Stats at Pro Football Reference

Brandon Spikes (born September 3, 1987) is an American former professional football player who was a linebacker in the National Football League (NFL). He played college football for the Florida Gators, was recognized as a consensus All-American twice and was a member of two BCS National Championship teams. He was selected by the New England Patriots in the second round of the 2010 NFL draft. He also played for the Buffalo Bills.

== Early life ==
Spikes was born in Shelby, North Carolina. He attended Crest High School in Shelby, and was a standout high school football player for the Crest Chargers. Coming out of high school, he was considered one of the best linebacker prospects in the nation. Spikes was rated the number one prospect in the state of North Carolina by Rivals.com and 33rd overall best player in the country according to Scout.com. He was also selected to play in the U.S. Army All-American Bowl.

== College career ==
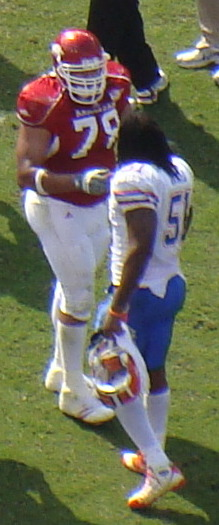
Spikes with the Florida Gators in 2008

Spikes accepted an athletic scholarship to attend the University of Florida over offers from several other colleges. At Florida, he was a four-year letterman, and played for coach Urban Meyer's Florida Gators football team from 2006 to 2009. Spikes appeared in 47 games for Florida with 39 starts at linebacker. He registered 307 tackles (178 solo) in his career, with 31.5 for loss, including 6.5 sacks. He forced two fumbles, recovered four fumbles and had six interceptions which he returned for 139 yards and four touchdowns, more than any other player in the nation and a Florida school record.

Spikes saw limited action in 2006, playing in nine games and recording 15 tackles as the backup to Brandon Siler. He was a member of the Gators' BCS National Championship team which defeated Ohio State. In 2007 Spikes became a starter after Siler was selected in the 2007 NFL draft. He started all 13 games at middle linebacker recording 131 tackles (81 solo), which was second in the Southeastern Conference. He tied for third in the SEC with 3 fumble recoveries. He also earned first-team All-SEC along with teammate Tim Tebow.

As a junior team captain in 2008, Spikes was a first-team All-SEC selection and a unanimous first-team All-American. He was selected as a finalist for the Bronko Nagurski Trophy and a semifinalist for the Lombardi Award and Chuck Bednarik Award. He was a starter at middle linebacker and led the team with 93 tackles on the season, including 8.0 for a loss. He returned two interceptions for a touchdown tying the school record. He made six tackles in the 2009 BCS National Championship Game win over Oklahoma and had seven tackles, two quarterback hurries and broke up one pass in the 2008 SEC Championship Game against Alabama. After his junior season, he decided to forgo early entry into the 2009 NFL draft and returned to Florida for another season.

In 2009, Spikes' production fell to 68 tackles (36 solo). In an October 31, 2009, game, Spikes was involved in an incident where he attempted to gouge the eyes of Georgia's Washaun Ealey. As a result of this, Florida coach Urban Meyer suspended Spikes for the first half of their next game against Vanderbilt. Spikes later announced that he would sit out for the entire game. As a senior team captain, he was one of three finalists for the 2009 Chuck Bednarik Award, a finalist for the 2009 Butkus Award, a first-team All-SEC selection, and a consensus All-American, receiving first-team honors from The Sporting News and the Walter Camp Football Foundation and second-team honors from the Associated Press.

== Professional career ==
Pre-draft measurables
| Height | Weight | Arm length | Hand span | 40-yard dash | 10-yard split | 20-yard split | Three-cone drill | Vertical jump | Broad jump |
|---|---|---|---|---|---|---|---|---|---|
| 6 ft 2 7/8 in (1.90 m) | 249 lb (113 kg) | 33 3/8 in (0.85 m) | 10 in (0.25 m) | 5.05 s | 1.75 s | 2.89 s | 6.97 s | 29.0 in (0.74 m) | 9 ft 3 in (2.82 m) |
All values from NFL Scouting Combine, except 40 time from Pro Day

=== New England Patriots (first stint) ===
Spikes was drafted by the New England Patriots in the second round (62nd overall) of the 2010 NFL draft. He signed a four-year contract on July 26, 2010. Spikes quickly became a starter at inside linebacker in the Patriots 3–4 defense, alongside Jerod Mayo. Against Baltimore in Week 6 of his rookie season, Spikes recorded 16 tackles in an overtime Patriots win. Spikes recorded his first career interception in a Week 13 win over the New York Jets on Monday Night Football.

On December 10, 2010, prior to the Patriots' Week 14 game against the Chicago Bears, Spikes was suspended four games (the remainder of the 2010 regular season) for a violation of the NFL's banned substances policy, reportedly for an ingredient in Spikes' ADHD medication. The same day, Spikes released the following statement:

"I've been contacted by the NFL and informed that I will be suspended four games for the detection of an illegal substance in a drug test. The substance was a medication that I should have gotten clarification on before taking. It was not a performance enhancer or an illegal drug. The integrity of the game is very important to me. I understand the league's ruling and apologize to my teammates, the fans and the Patriots organization for this mistake."

He finished his rookie season with 61 tackles, one interception, and three passes defensed. With his season shortened by the suspension, he played in 12 games, starting eight.

At the end of the 2011 season, Spikes and the Patriots appeared in Super Bowl XLVI. He started in the game, but the Patriots lost to the New York Giants by a score of 21–17.

On November 16, 2012, Spikes was fined $25,000 for a late hit against the Buffalo Bills in Week 10.

Spikes dealt with a knee injury during the 2013 season, but played in all 16 games. After being late to practice in January 2014, Spikes was placed on injured reserve. Spikes was not re-signed by the team in the offseason.

=== Buffalo Bills (first stint) ===
On March 14, 2014, Spikes agreed to a one-year, $3.25 million contract with the Buffalo Bills. On September 12, 2014, Spikes was fined $8,268 for a late hit on Chicago Bears wide receiver Santonio Holmes.

=== New England Patriots (second stint) ===
On May 18, 2015, Spikes agreed to a one-year contract to return to the Patriots. On June 8, 2015, Spikes was released due to a police investigation dealing with an abandoned car belonging to Spikes, which was possibly involved in a hit-and-run. Massachusetts State Police cited Spikes on June 12, 2015, for leaving a scene of an accident with injury, driving negligently, and failing to stay within marked lanes.

=== Buffalo Bills (second stint) ===
Spikes signed a one-year contract with the Buffalo Bills on August 7, 2016.

=== NFL statistics ===
| Year | Team | GP | COMB | TOTAL | AST | SACK | FF | FR | FR YDS | INT | IR YDS | AVG IR | LNG | TD | PD |
|---|---|---|---|---|---|---|---|---|---|---|---|---|---|---|---|
| 2010 | NE | 12 | 61 | 38 | 23 | 0.0 | 0 | 0 | 0 | 1 | 5 | 5 | 5 | 0 | 3 |
| 2011 | NE | 8 | 47 | 32 | 15 | 0.0 | 0 | 0 | 0 | 0 | 0 | 0 | 0 | 0 | 1 |
| 2012 | NE | 15 | 92 | 57 | 35 | 1.0 | 5 | 0 | 0 | 0 | 0 | 0 | 0 | 0 | 7 |
| 2013 | NE | 16 | 86 | 48 | 38 | 0.0 | 0 | 1 | 0 | 1 | 3 | 3 | 3 | 0 | 2 |
| 2014 | BUF | 16 | 54 | 33 | 21 | 1.0 | 1 | 0 | 0 | 0 | 0 | 0 | 0 | 0 | 3 |
| 2016 | BUF | 11 | 9 | 4 | 5 | 0.0 | 0 | 0 | 0 | 0 | 0 | 0 | 0 | 0 | 0 |
| Career | | 78 | 349 | 212 | 137 | 2.0 | 6 | 1 | 0 | 2 | 8 | 4 | 5 | 0 | 15 |

== Personal life ==
As a child, Spikes was raised by his brother, Breyon Middlebrooks, while their mother, Sherry Allen, worked 12-hour days at a fiberglass plant. In 2003, Middlebrooks was found guilty of first-degree murder and sentenced to life in prison, the result of a drug deal in 2001. He writes to Spikes regularly and watched what games featuring Spikes that he could from his cell at Scotland Correctional Institute in Laurinburg, North Carolina. He is the younger cousin of former NFL linebacker Takeo Spikes.

Both Spikes and Lela Woods, with whom he shares a daughter, appeared on Oxygen's special on his Florida teammate Aaron Hernandez.

== Coaching ==
In August 2023, former Florida Gators linebacker Brandon Spikes returned to the Universitiy of Florida football program as a student assistant coach. Spikes rejoined the program while completing his degree. Head coach Billy Napier praised Spikes' knowledge of the game and his connection to the University, noting that he wanted to contribute to the program that had played a significant role in his development as both a player and a person.

== See also ==
- 2006 Florida Gators football team
- 2008 Florida Gators football team
- 2008 College Football All-America Team
- 2009 College Football All-America Team
- List of Florida Gators football All-Americans
- List of Florida Gators in the NFL draft
- List of New England Patriots players
