= Rico McCoy =

American gridiron football player (born 1987)

No. 5
- Position: Linebacker

Personal information
- Born: November 6, 1987 (age 39); Washington, D.C., U.S.
- Listed height: 6 ft 1 in (1.85 m)
- Listed weight: 224 lb (102 kg)

Career information
- High school: St. John's College
- College: Tennessee
- NFL draft: 2010: undrafted

Career history
- Winnipeg Blue Bombers (2010); Edmonton Eskimos (2011); Colorado Ice (2013)

Awards and highlights
- 3× Second-team All-SEC (2007, 2008, 2009)

Career CFL statistics
- Tackles: 1

Rico McCoy (born November 6, 1987) is an American former football linebacker. He played collegiate football with the Tennessee Volunteers and was considered one of the best linebacker prospects available for the 2010 NFL draft, drawing comparisons to Derrick Brooks. Not selected by any team, McCoy was picked up after the draft by the Buccaneers as an undrafted free agent.

== Early life ==
A native of South East Washington, D. C., McCoy attended St. John's College High School, where he played high school football. He was a three-year starter, playing tailback as sophomore and linebacker final two seasons. As junior, McCoy finished with 120 tackles and five sacks. In his senior year, he tallied 118 tackles, eight tackles for loss, seven sacks, three forced fumbles and two interceptions while adding eight rushing touchdowns.

McCoy captained the East Squad at the U.S. Army All-American Bowl in San Antonio, Texas. Considered a four-star recruit by Rivals.com, McCoy was listed as the No. 4 outside linebacker in the nation in 2005. He selected Tennessee over Ohio State, Pittsburgh, and Syracuse.

== College career ==
• 2009 All- SEC Coaches (2nd) • 2008 All-SEC Coaches (2nd) • 2007 All-SEC Coaches (2nd) and Associated Press (2nd) • 2006 Freshman All-America Collegefootballnews.com (3rd) • 2006 Freshman All-SEC Coaches

After redshirting his initial year at Tennessee, McCoy played in all 13 games in 2006, while starting in two of them, including the 2007 Outback Bowl in which he recorded two tackles. He finished the season with 38 tackles and was named to the Coaches′ Freshman All-SEC team.

As a sophomore, McCoy started all 13 Tennessee games, and led or tied the team for most tackles in six of those games. He ranked second on team (behind Jerod Mayo) and sixth among Southeastern Conference leaders with 106 tackles. He also recorded his first career interception against Southern Miss. In the 2007 SEC Championship Game against LSU, McCoy finished with eight tackles, a forced fumble and a tackle for a loss.

== Professional career ==
McCoy was signed by the Winnipeg Blue Bombers of the Canadian Football League in June 2010, spending the season on the roster as back-up Middle Linebacker to incumbent starter Joe Lobendahn.
