= 2008 Florida Gators football team =

103rd football season in school history; third national championship victory

2008 Florida Gators football

Consensus national champion SEC champion SEC Eastern Division champion Florida Cup champion

SEC Championship Game, W 31–20 vs. Alabama

BCS National Championship Game, W 24–14 vs. Oklahoma
- Conference: Southeastern Conference
- Eastern Division

Ranking
- Coaches: No. 1
- AP: No. 1
- Record: 13–1 (7–1 SEC)
- Head coach: Urban Meyer (4th season)
- Offensive coordinator: Dan Mullen (4th season)
- Offensive scheme: Spread option
- Defensive coordinator: Charlie Strong (6th season)
- Base defense: 4–3
- Captains: Louis Murphy; James Smith; Brandon Spikes; Ryan Stamper; Tim Tebow; Phil Trautwein
- Home stadium: Ben Hill Griffin Stadium

2008 Southeastern Conference football standings
	Conf.			Overall
Team	W		L	W		L
Eastern Division
No. 1 Florida x$#	7	–	1	13	–	1
No. 13 Georgia	6	–	2	10	–	3
Vanderbilt	4	–	4	7	–	6
South Carolina	4	–	4	7	–	6
Tennessee	3	–	5	5	–	7
Kentucky	2	–	6	7	–	6
Western Division
No. 6 Alabama x%	8	–	0	12	–	2
No. 14 Ole Miss	5	–	3	9	–	4
LSU	3	–	5	8	–	5
Arkansas	2	–	6	5	–	7
Auburn	2	–	6	5	–	7
Mississippi State	2	–	6	4	–	8
Championship: Florida 31, Alabama 20
# – BCS National Champion; $ – BCS representative as conference champion; % – BCS at-large representative; x – Division champion/co-champions; Rankings from AP Poll

The 2008 Florida Gators football team represented the University of Florida in the sport of American football during the 2008 NCAA Division I FBS football season. The Gators competed in the Football Bowl Subdivision (FBS) of the National Collegiate Athletic Association (NCAA) and the Eastern Division of the Southeastern Conference (SEC), and played their home games in Ben Hill Griffin Stadium on the university's Gainesville, Florida, campus. They were led by fourth-year head coach Urban Meyer.

After clinching the SEC East, the Gators defeated then top-ranked Alabama Crimson Tide 31–20 in the SEC Championship Game to win their eighth conference title. They capped their season by defeating the Oklahoma Sooners in the BCS National Championship Game 24–14. The Gators finished the season ranked No. 1 in the AP Poll and the Coaches' Poll. Of the team's 120-player roster, 30 members went on to have stints in the NFL. Bleacher Report has often named the 2008 Florida Gators as one of the greatest college football teams of all time.

== Before the season ==
In the offseason, Florida coach Urban Meyer suffered the loss of assistant coaches for the first time in his tenure. Co-recruiting coordinator and safeties coach Doc Holliday left to become an assistant at his alma mater, West Virginia, running backs coach Stan Drayton took the same job with the Tennessee Volunteers, and co-defensive coordinator and defensive line coach Greg Mattison joined the coaching staff of the Baltimore Ravens.

== Schedule ==
Date	Opponent	Rank	Site	TV	Result	Attendance
August 30	Hawaii*	No. 5	Ben Hill Griffin Stadium; Gainesville, FL	Raycom	W 56–10	90,575
September 6	Miami (FL)*	No. 5	Ben Hill Griffin Stadium; Gainesville, FL (rivalry) (College GameDay)	ESPN	W 26–3	90,833
September 20	at Tennessee	No. 4	Neyland Stadium; Knoxville, TN (rivalry)	CBS	W 30–6	106,138
September 27	Ole Miss	No. 4	Ben Hill Griffin Stadium; Gainesville, FL	Raycom	L 30–31	90,106
October 4	at Arkansas	No. 12	Razorback Stadium; Fayetteville, AR	Raycom	W 38–7	70,072
October 11	No. 3 LSU	No. 11	Ben Hill Griffin Stadium; Gainesville, FL (rivalry)	CBS	W 51–21	90,684
October 25	Kentucky^{†}	No. 5	Ben Hill Griffin Stadium; Gainesville, FL (rivalry)	Raycom	W 63–5	90,589
November 1	vs. No. 8 Georgia	No. 5	Jacksonville Municipal Stadium; Jacksonville, FL (rivalry)	CBS	W 49–10	84,649
November 8	at Vanderbilt	No. 4	Vanderbilt Stadium; Nashville, TN	ESPN2	W 42–14	39,773
November 15	No. 24 South Carolina	No. 3	Ben Hill Griffin Stadium; Gainesville, FL	CBS	W 56–6	90,646
November 22	The Citadel*	No. 3	Ben Hill Griffin Stadium; Gainesville, FL	PPV	W 70–19	90,374
November 29	at No. 23 Florida State*	No. 2	Doak Campbell Stadium; Tallahassee, FL (rivalry)	ABC	W 45–15	83,237
December 6	vs. No. 1 Alabama	No. 2	Georgia Dome; Atlanta, GA (SEC Championship / rivalry) (College GameDay)	CBS	W 31–20	75,892
January 8, 2009	vs. No. 2 Oklahoma*	No. 1	Dolphin Stadium; Miami Gardens, FL (BCS National Championship Game) (College GameDay)	FOX	W 24–14	78,468
*Non-conference game; ^{†}Homecoming; Rankings from AP Poll released prior to game.

Sources: 2012 Florida Gators Football Media Guide, GatorZone.com

== Rankings ==
Ranking movements Legend: ██ Increase in ranking ██ Decrease in ranking ( ) = First-place votes
	Week																
Poll	Pre	1	2	3	4	5	6	7	8	9	10	11	12	13	14	15	Final
AP	5 (6)	5 (5)	4 (4)	4 (1)	4 (1)	12	11	5	5	5	4 (1)	3	3 (2)	2 (2)	2 (3)	1 (50)	1 (48)
Coaches	5 (5)	5 (3)	4 (3)	4 (1)	4 (1)	13	12	7	7	7	5	3	3 (1)	3 (1)	4 (1)	2 (26)	1 (60)
Harris	Not released					11	11	6	6	6	4 (1)	3 (1)	3 (1)	2 (3)	2 (4)	1 (77)	Not released
BCS	Not released								10	8	5	4	4	4	4	2	Not released

== Game summaries ==
=== Hawaii ===
Hawaii at Florida

Team	1	2	3	4	Total
Hawaii	0	0	0	10	10
• Florida	0	28	28	0	56

- Date: August 30
- Location: Ben Hill Griffin Stadium, Gainesville, Florida
- Game attendance: 90,575

Scoring summary
2	11:39	FLA	Brandon James, 1 yard run (Plays: 10 – Yards: 80 – Time: 5:09) (Jonathan Phillips kick)	FLA 7–0
2	10:47	FLA	Major Wright, 32 yard interception return (INT thrown by Inoke Funaki) (Jonathan Phillips kick)	FLA 14–0
2	5:35	FLA	Brandon James, 74 yard punt return (Plays: 0 – Yards: 74 – Time: 0:00) (Jonathan Phillips kick)	FLA 21–0
2	3:00	FLA	Chris Rainey, 38 yard run (Plays: 2 – Yards: 48 – Time: 0:22) (Jonathan Phillips kick)	FLA 28–0
3	12:16	FLA	Jeffery Demps, 62 yard run (Plays: 8 – Yards: 80 – Time: 2:44) (Jonathan Phillips kick)	FLA 35–0
3	9:42	FLA	Louis Murphy, 48 yard pass from Tim Tebow (Plays: 2 – Yards: 58 – Time: 0:38) (Jonathan Phillips kick)	FLA 42–0
3	2:52	FLA	Cameron Newton, 1 yard run (Plays: 12 – Yards: 70 – Time: 5:20) (Jonathan Phillips kick)	FLA 49–0
3	0:40	FLA	Ahmad Black, 80 yard interception return (INT thrown by Inoke Funaki) (Jonathan Phillips kick)	FLA 56–0
4	9:38	HAW	Daniel Kelly, 30 yard field goal (Plays: 10 – Yards: 55 – Time: 5:42)	FLA 56–3
4	1:37	HAW	Greg Salas, 13 yard pass from Inoke Funaki (Plays: 6 – Yards: 80 – Time: 5:47) (Daniel Kelly kick)	FLA 56–10

The Florida Gators opened the season against the Hawaii Warriors, led by head coach Greg McMackin. This was the first meeting between the two teams, but the two programs had become familiar with one another at the end of the 2007 college football regular season. 2007 Florida starting quarterback Tim Tebow and 2007 Hawaii starting quarterback Colt Brennan were both finalists for the Heisman Trophy where the two met in New York for the award ceremony. In the time leading up to the award presentation, the then-Hawaii head coach June Jones made comments regarding Tim Tebow and how he would fare against his own quarterback Colt Brennan in their respective offensive systems, referring to Tebow as a "system quarterback." His comments "infuriated Gators fans, who expressed their displeasure in Internet chat rooms and blogs." At the conclusion of the 2007–2008 bowl season, June Jones left Hawaii to become the head coach of SMU, leaving the opening game against Hawaii without Brennan or Jones.

The game opened with the 10th highest attendance in school history with 90,575. Both teams struggled in the first quarter on offense with neither team being able to put points on the board. The second quarter featured scores by the Gators on offense, defense, and special teams. This was the first time the Gators scored in all three facets of the game since beating the Tennessee Volunteers 59–20 in the 2007 season. The first touchdown of the season came off of a Brandon James 1-yard touchdown run capping an 80-yard drive that took only 10 plays. Less than one minute later, Florida safety Major Wright picked off a pass and returned it 32 yards for the touchdown. After a defensive stop by the Gators on the ensuing Warriors' drive, special teams standout Brandon James returned a punt for a touchdown. This was his third punt return for a touchdown in his career. The final score of the half by the Gators was a 33-yard rushing touchdown by redshirt freshman Chris Rainey with 3:00 left in the first half. This drive only took two plays in 22 seconds.

The second half was a mirror image of the first half for the Gators. Another 28 points was scored in the third quarter beginning with a 62-yard rushing touchdown by true freshman Jeffery Demps. The next Gator offensive possession featured the first touchdown pass of the season by Heisman-winner Tim Tebow. Tim Tebow and Louis Murphy connected on a 48-yard pass on the second play of the drive to score a touchdown only 38 seconds after having initiating the drive. Near the end of the 3rd quarter, sophomore quarterback Cam Newton stood in for Tim Tebow and put together a drive capped off with a 1-yard QB rushing TD. The final score the Gators put on the board was an interception returned for a touchdown by Gator safety Ahmad Black in his first career game as a Gator. Entering into the fourth quarter, Florida led 56–0. Hawaii was able to put 10 points on the board ending the game with a score of 56–10. Hawaii used three quarterbacks, all of whom threw for interceptions. The Gators' offense finished with 406 total yards; 255 of those coming on the ground. This was the first game since the 2006 season where Tim Tebow did not have at least two touchdowns in a game. In the previous season, he had at least one rushing touchdown and one passing touchdown in all 13 games (14 game streak dating to 2007 BCS National Championship Game). The Gators' defense forced six Hawaii turnovers and held Hawaii's offense to only 241 yards.

=== Miami ===
Miami at Florida

Team	1	2	3	4	Total
Miami (FL)	0	3	0	0	3
• Florida	7	2	0	17	26

- Date: September 6
- Location: Ben Hill Griffin Stadium, Gainesville, Florida
- Game attendance: 90,833

Scoring summary
1	11:39	FLA	Aaron Hernandez, 14 yard pass from Tim Tebow (Plays: 5 – Yards: 35 – Time: 1:44) (Jonathan Phillips kick)	FLA 7–0
2	12:51	MIA	Matt Bosher, 50 yard field goal (Plays: 16 – Yards: 48 – Time: 8:42)	FLA 7–3
2	0:47	FLA	Safety, Brandon James, 74 yard punt return (Plays: 7 – Yards: 9 – Time: 3:30)	FLA 9–3
4	12:16	FLA	Percy Harvin, 2 yard run (Plays: 12 – Yards: 86 – Time: 5:50) (Jonathan Phillips kick)	FLA 16–3
4	8:59	FLA	Louis Murphy, 19 yard pass from Tim Tebow (Plays: 5 – Yards: 95 – Time: 1:34) (Jonathan Phillips kick)	FLA 23–3
4	0:25	FLA	Jonathan Phillips, 29 yd FG (Plays: 4 – Yards: 5 – Time: 1:31)	FLA 26–3

The Florida Gators took on the Miami Hurricanes for the first time since the 2004 Peach Bowl where the Gators lost to Miami 27–10. This game is also the first regular season meeting between the two teams since 2003 where the then #18 Gators nearly upset the #3 Miami Hurricanes at the Orange Bowl. The last time the Gators defeated the Hurricanes was in 1985 where the Gators defeated Miami in Miami with a score of 35–23. Miami entered this game with a six-game winning streak and came in leading the series 28–25. The winner of this game receives the War Canoe Trophy. An attendance record was set with this game at Ben Hill Griffin Stadium with 90,833.

The Hurricanes received the ball to start the game with Florida deferring to the second half. Florida's defense held Miami to one net yard on their opening drive and forced a quick three and out. The resulting punt netted only 14 yards giving Florida excellent field position at the Miami 35-yard line. The Gators, led by quarterback Tim Tebow, put together a 5 play drive ending in a touchdown pass to TE Aaron Hernandez that only took 1:44 off the clock. Although the tempo the Gators set on their first offensive possession was quick, they were unable to score again in the first half on offense; having to punt on all four of their following first half possessions. Miami was able to put together a 42-yard drive with 16 plays consuming 8:42 of the second quarter resulting in a made 50-yard field goal. This would end up being the only points of the game Miami scored as well as the closest the Florida defense would allow Miami to get to the end zone. Florida's special teams was able to block a Miami punt attempt resulting in a safety as the ball went out of bounds with 47 seconds left in the half. This brought the halftime score to 9–3.

The Gators received the ball in the second half and were unable to score on their opening drive. Offensive woes continued for both sides as neither team was able to score points. By the end of the third quarter, Florida's defense forced five Miami punts and allowed only one field goal. The fourth quarter had the Gators offense scoring 17 total points. A drive starting near the end of the 3rd quarter went 86 yards down the field and ended with a fourth quarter 2-yard rushing touchdown by Percy Harvin. After Florida's defense stopping Miami once again, Florida's offense was able to put together another long scoring drive; this one a 95-yard drive taking only 1:34 ending on a 19-yard Tim Tebow touchdown pass to Louis Murphy. The Gator defense forced three fourth quarter Miami punts, 8 total for the game, with the final score coming off of a made field goal by the Gators, bringing the final score 26–3. Florida's offense was only able to rush for 89 yards and pass for 256. Neither team had turnovers, but the Gators' defense held Miami to 140 total yards (79 passing, 61 rushing) and kept Miami out of the red zone the entire game.

=== Tennessee ===
Florida at Tennessee

Team	1	2	3	4	Total
• Florida	17	3	7	3	30
Tennessee	0	0	0	6	6

- Date: September 20
- Location: Neyland Stadium, Knoxville, Tennessee
- Game attendance: 106,138

Scoring summary
1	10:15	FLA	Aaron Hernandez, 2 yard pass from Tim Tebow (Plays: 8 – Yards: 44 – Time: 4:45) (Jonathan Phillips kick)	FLA 7–0
1	7:35	FLA	Jonathan Phillips, 39 yard field goal (Plays: 4 – Yards: 1 – Time: 1:20)	FLA 10–0
1	4:42	FLA	Brandon James, 78 yard punt return (Plays: 0 – Yards: 78 – Time: 0:00) (Jonathan Phillips kick)	FLA 17–0
2	4:43	FLA	Jonathan Phillips, 40 yard field goal (Plays: 12 – Yards: 74 – Time: 6:53)	FLA 20–0
3	4:29	FLA	Percy Harvin, 15 yard pass from Tim Tebow (Plays: 8 – Yards: 47 – Time: 4:42) (Jonathan Phillips kick)	FLA 27–0
4	14:18	TEN	Jonathan Crompton, 1 yard run (Plays: 11 – Yards: 63 – Time: 5:11) 2 pt failed	FLA 27–6
4	10:15	FLA	Jonathan Phillips, 27 yard field goal (Plays: 10 – Yards: 53 – Time: 4:49)	FLA 30–6

Florida entered the game with a three-game winning streak started during Florida head coach Urban Meyer's first season at Florida. Tennessee led the series 19–18 all-time against the Gators dating back to 1916. Coming off of an SEC East title the previous season, Tennessee opened SEC play against the Gators after having lost early to UCLA out of conference on the road. The Gators and Volunteers last met in the Swamp in 2007 where the Gators won 59–20. The previous time the two met at Neyland Stadium, the Gators were able to win by a slim one point and then went on to win the BCS National Championship. The Volunteers would be the first of four regular season teams the Gators faced that were coached by a championship-winning head coach (the other three being Les Miles of LSU, Steve Spurrier of South Carolina, and Bobby Bowden of FSU).

The Gators started the game on offense at the Tennessee 44-yard line and quickly started where they left off the last time they played the Volunteers. The first possession of the game resulted in a 44-yard drive capped off with a Tim Tebow touchdown off a jump pass to TE Aaron Hernandez. Florida's defense helped get the ball back on offense when true freshman Gator CB Janoris Jenkin's forced a fumble on Tennessee's Montario Hardesty. Florida responded with a 39-yard field goal. After another failed drive for Tennessee on offense, the Volunteers punted the ball to Florida punt returner Brandon James who returned it for a touchdown. This was James' fourth punt-return for a touchdown of his career, tying the school record held by Jacquez Green. The Volunteers had their second fumble, which was recovered by Gators defensive lineman Carlos Dunlap, and led to another Florida field goal extending the lead to 20–0. Tennessee was able to drive the ball down into Florida territory—as close as the one-yard line. However, Florida's true freshman cornerback Janoris Jenkins intercepted a pass preventing any Tennessee points and shut out Tennessee in the first half.

Tennessee received the ball to start the second half and quickly went three and out giving the ball back to Tim Tebow and the Gators' offense. The Gators' offense was able to put together a 47-yard drive finishing with a 15-yard Tim Tebow touchdown pass to WR Percy Harvin extending the lead to 27–0. Tennessee was able to get points on the board on the following drive. A 63-yard Tennessee drive ending with a Jonathan Crompton 1-yard TD run. The attempted 2-point conversion failed cutting Florida's lead to 21. In response, the Gators were able to take 4:49 off the clock and extend their lead with a Jonathan Phillps field goal, bringing the final score to 30–6. The Gators defense held Tennessee to only nine possessions on offense. Three of those ended with turnovers (2 fumbles, 1 interception), four ending with punts, one with a turnover on downs, and one touchdown. Although the Volunteers were able to account for more yards on offense (258 vs 243), the Gators won the turnover margin 3–0.

=== Ole Miss ===
Ole Miss Rebels (2–2) at #4 Florida Gators (3–0)

Quarter	1	2	3	4	Total
Ole Miss	7	0	17	7	31
Florida	0	17	0	13	30

at Ben Hill Griffith Stadium, Gainesville, Florida

- Date: September 27, 2008
- Game time: 12:30 p.m.
- Game weather: Clear, 85 °F (29 °C)
- Game attendance: 90,106
- Referee: Hubert Owens
- TV: Raycom
- Box Score

Game information

First quarter

- MISS – Jevan Snead 1-yard run (Joshua Shene kick), 3:12. Ole Miss 7–0. Drive: 10 plays, 70 yards, 4:24.

Second quarter

- FLA – Jonathan Phillips 32-yard field goal, 13:31. Ole Miss 7–3. Drive: 12 plays, 46 yards, 4:41.
- FLA – Percy Harvin 43-yard pass from Tim Tebow (Jonathan Phillips kick), 12:26. Florida 10–7. Drive: 1 plays, 43 yards, 0:12.
- FLA – Tim Tebow 1-yard run (Jonathan Phillips kick), 1:06. Florida 17–7. Drive: 5 plays, 81 yards, 1:20.

Third quarter

- MISS – Joshua Shene 33-yard field goal, 11:00. Florida 17–10. Drive: 7 plays, 19 yards, 3:36.
- MISS – Cordera Eason 18-yard pass from Jevan Snead (Joshua Shene kick), 10:30. Tie 17–17. Drive: 3 plays, 18 yards, 0:19.
- MISS – Dexter McCluster 40-yard run (Joshua Shene kick), 0:52. Ole Miss 24–17. Drive: 7 plays, 72 yards, 3:42.

Fourth quarter

- FLA – Tim Tebow 1-yard run (Jonathan Phillips kick), 11:26. Tie 24–24. Drive: 9 plays, 49 yards, 4:26.
- MISS – Shay Hodge 86-yard pass from Jevan Snead (Joshua Shene kick), 5:26. Ole Miss 31–24. Drive: 3 plays, 89 yards, 1:28.
- FLA – Percy Harvin 15-yard run (kick blocked), 3:28. Ole Miss 31–30. Drive: 6 plays, 68 yards, 1:58.

Top passers

- MISS – Jevan Snead – 9/20, 185 yards, 2 TD, INT
- FLA – Tim Tebow – 24/38, 319 yards, TD

Top rushers

- MISS – Dexter McCluster – 11 rushes, 60 yards, TD
- FLA – Percy Harvin – 10 rushes, 82 yards, TD

Top receivers

- MISS – Shay Hodge – 3 receptions, 133 yards, TD
- FLA – Percy Harvin – 13 receptions, 186 yards, TD

Florida's SEC home opener had the Gators face off against the Ole Miss Rebels. This is the first time the Gators had played the Rebels at home since their loss in 2003 against the Eli Manning-led Rebels squad. This game also concluded the home-and-home series with the SEC West opponent after the Gators won the first game in the H-H series against the Rebels last season with a score of 30–24 in which Tim Tebow set a school-record for rushing yards by a quarterback with 166 yards on 27 carries. This was Urban Meyer's second time coaching against a Houston Nutt coached team with the first time being the Arkansas Razorbacks in the 2006 SEC Championship Game where the Gators defeated the Hogs 38–28 to go on and win the 2007 BCS National Championship. Entering this game, Urban Meyer was 21–1 at home in Gainesville and Houston Nutt was 0–3 against the Gators. Ole Miss's starting quarterback Jevan Snead, a transfer from the University of Texas, had committed to play for the Gators prior to the 2006 season before decommitting.

The game started with Ole Miss on offense, which didn't stay on the field long after a quick 3-and-out forced punt. The Gators then took over on offense and entered Ole Miss territory, where they were unable to score on their drive, which ended with a turnover on downs. Ole Miss was the first score on their ensuing 70-yard drive with a touchdown. This was the first touchdown the Gators allowed in the first quarter of a game and the first time the Gators trailed in the season. In response, the Gators drove into Ole Miss territory where they were forced to settle for a 38-yard field goal, narrowing the lead 7–3. With just two offensive plays on Ole Miss's next possession, Florida safety Major Wright picked off a Jevan Snead pass and set up the Gators in Ole Miss territory. Tim Tebow connected with WR Percy Harvin on a 43-yard touchdown pass giving the Gators a 10–7 lead with 12:26 remaining in the second quarter. After another 3 and out by the Rebels, Florida, regained possession, but quickly turned it over. Tight end Aaron Hernandez of the Gators fumbled the ball at the Ole Miss 35-yard line. This was the first Gator turnover of the season. Ole Miss's offense was unable to do much the rest of the half and ended their next two possession with punts and a third with a turnover on downs. The Gators, however, were able to score another touchdown with an 81-yard drive capped off with a Tim Tebow 1-yard rushing touchdown, his first of the season. This brought the score to 17–7 at the half.

The third quarter for the Gators saw their 10-point lead turn into a 7-point deficit. On the Gators first drive of the second half, Percy Harvin fumbled the ball while rushing up the middle. This set up the Rebels in excellent field position at the Florida 34-yard line. Ole Miss would capitalize on the turnover by scoring with a 33-yard field goal. Florida's turnover woes continued shortly after the Rebels' kickoff when Tim Tebow fumbled the ball at the Gators' 18-yard line. This positioned Ole Miss for the go ahead touchdown pass that only took 18 seconds to score. The game was then tied 17–17 at only the 10:30 mark in the third quarter. Florida's next two possessions on offense went only −3 yards and 19 yards, respectively, and required punts. After having obtained possession with 4:34 left in the third, Jevan Snead and Ole Miss put together a 3:42 drive that went 72 yards down the field resulting in a rushing touchdown by RB Dexter McCluster. This brought Ole Miss's lead back up to 7 as it was early in the 1st quarter. After a 25-yard kickoff return by Brandon James, Florida put together a 49-yard drive ending with touchdown off of a Tim Tebow rush, tying the game at 24 a piece. Florida's defense was unable to stop Ole Miss from scoring as they responded with an 86-yard touchdown reception by Shay Hodge giving the Rebels a 31–24 lead with only 5:26 left in the game. Starting 68 yards away from the end zone, Florida scored a touchdown in less than 2 minutes with Percy Harvin running in from 15 yards for the score. The Gators only needed an extra point after the touchdown to be made to tie the game at 31, but were unable to do so after Ole Miss's Kentrell Lockett blocked the attempt. Florida regained possession with 2:05 left in the game and were able to bring the ball to the Ole Miss 32-yard line. On 4th and 1 and 41 seconds left in the game, Tim Tebow rushed the ball and was stopped short of the first down marker—turning over the ball on downs. Ole Miss gained possession and ran the clock out upsetting the higher ranked Gators at home.

The Gators would end the game with more yards, 443 to 325, as well as with more first downs, 24 to 10. The Gators, however, had three turnovers, which was uncharacteristic given that they had none in the first three games of the season. Ole Miss only had one turnover in the game as well as double the number of penalties (10 to 5). After the game, Florida quarterback Tim Tebow addressed the media on the loss to Ole Miss:

I'm sorry. I'm extremely sorry. We were hoping for an undefeated season. That was my goal, something Florida's never done here. But I promise you one thing: a lot of good will come out of this. You have never seen any player in the entire country play as hard as I will play the rest of this season and you'll never see someone push the rest of the team as hard as I will push everybody the rest of this season, and you'll never see a team play harder than we will the rest of this season. God Bless.

— Tim Tebow

The speech went on to be engraved on a plaque that was placed outside the entrance to the new Gators football facilities.

=== Arkansas ===
Florida at Arkansas

Team	1	2	3	4	Total
• Florida	7	7	3	21	38
Arkansas	0	0	7	0	7

- Date: October 4
- Location: Razorback Stadium, Fayetteville, Arkansas
- Game attendance: 70,072

Scoring summary
1	6:54	FLA	Brandon James, 2 yard pass from Tim Tebow (Plays: 10 – Yards: 64 – Time: 5:03) (Jonathan Phillips kick)	FLA 7–0
2	7:19	FLA	Jeffery Demps, 16 yard run (Plays: 1 – Yards: 16 – Time: 0:38) (Jonathan Phillips kick)	FLA 14–0
3	9:17	FLA	Jonathan Phillips, 37 yard field goal (Plays: 12 – Yards: 46 – Time: 5:43)	FLA 17–0
3	5:50	ARK	Michael Smith, 6 yard run (Plays: 7 – Yards: 53 – Time: 3:27) (Shay Haddock kick)	FLA 17–7
4	11:58	FLA	Percy Harvin, 21 yard pass from Tim Tebow (Plays: 6 – Yards: 83 – Time: 2:43) (Jonathan Phillips kick)	FLA 24–7
4	5:10	FLA	Chris Rainey, 75 yard run (Plays: 4 – Yards: 80 – Time: 2:17) (Jonathan Phillips kick)	FLA 31–7
4	1:04	FLA	Jeffery Demps, 48 yard run (Plays: 7 – Yards: 73 – Time: 2:29) (Jonathan Phillips kick)	FLA 38–7

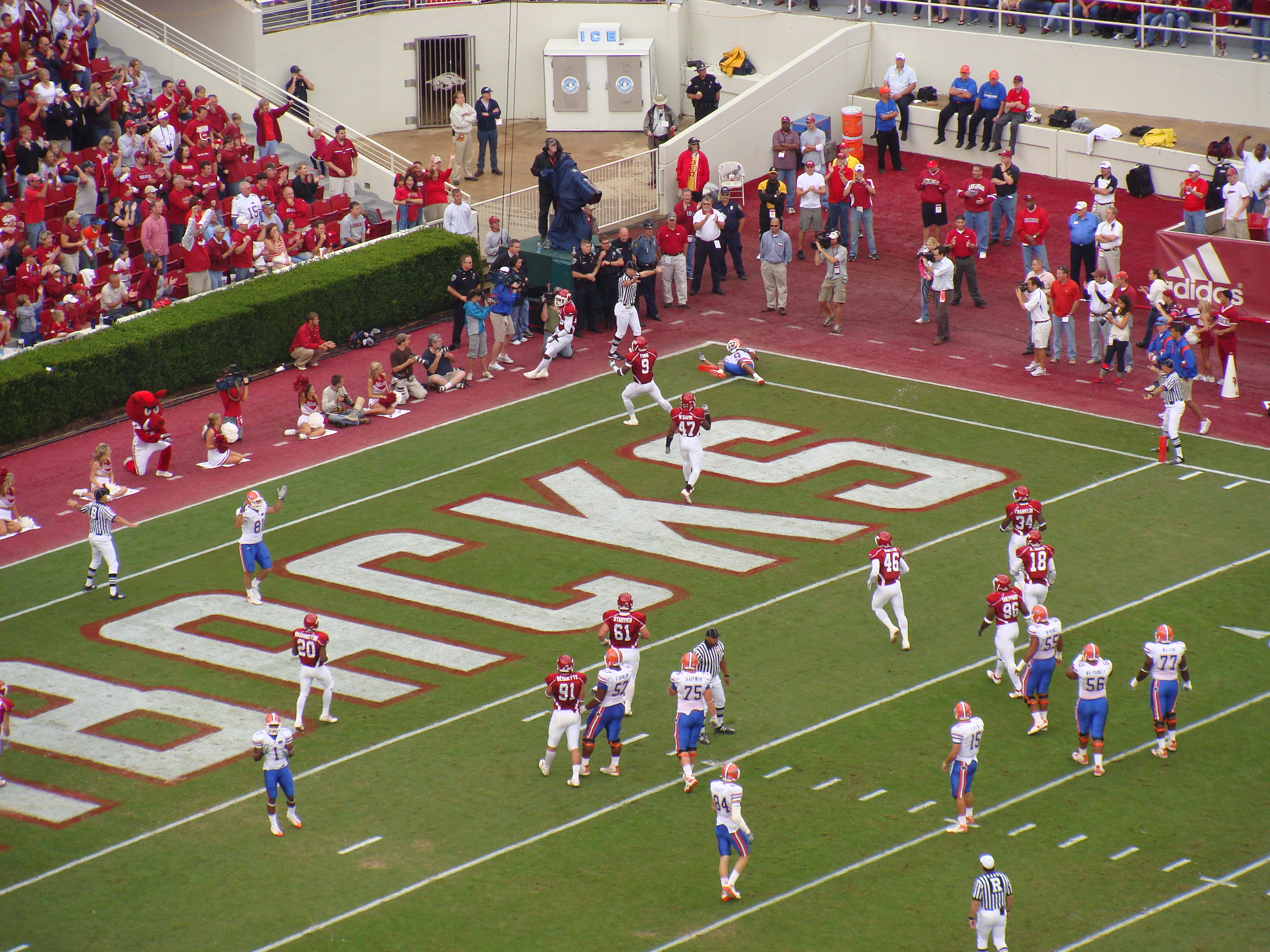

The Gators traveled to Fayetteville, Arkansas, to take on their second of three SEC West opponents in the regular season to face first year Razorback coach Bobby Petrino. Entering the game, the Gators held a 6–1 series lead over Arkansas with the Gators' last win coming in the 2006 SEC Championship Game that was coached by former Arkansas head coach Houston Nutt. This is the first of a two-game home-and-home series on the rotating SEC West opponent schedule with next year's meeting taking place in Gainesville, Florida. Arkansas entered the game coming off of a loss to then-#7 ranked Texas at Texas by a score of 52–10.

Arkansas received the kickoff to start the game and put together a 44-yard drive before failing to convert a fourth and 4 with a sack by Gator defensive standout Carlos Dunlap. On the resulting Gator possession, a scoring drive was capped with a Tim Tebow 2-yard shuffle pass to Brandon James resulting in a touchdown. As with Arkansas' first drive, a failed fourth down attempt put the ball back in the Gators' hands, but the offense stuttered and was forced to punt. Arkansas continued to struggle on offense, but field position in their favor by punting the ball to the Florida one yard line, giving the Gators difficult field position with which to work. Pinned back on their side of the field, the Gators' Chas Henry eventually punted the ball on a 4th and 11. Arkansas' Michael Smith fumbled the ball, which was recovered by Florida's Brandon James—the first of his career. The Gators capitalized on the Razorbacks' turnover and scored on a 36-yard rushing TD by true freshman Jeffery Demps, extending their lead to 14–0 halfway through the second quarter. With just 11 seconds remaining in the half and Arkansas deep in Florida's territory at the Florida 25-yard line, sophomore CB Joe Haden intercepted a Casey Dick pass closing out the half, 14–0.

The Gators opened the second half on offense and got as far as the Arkansas 20-yard line, but not farther. The 5:43 drive finished with a 37-yard field goal by Jonathan Phillips, extending the Gators' lead to 17–0. The Gators' defense wasn't able to achieve a shutout with the Razorbacks' response on the next possession. Casey Dick and the Hogs put together a 7-play, 53-yard drive in 3:27, scoring a touchdown and narrowing the Gators' lead to 10 points. Tim Tebow threw his first interception of the season on the following drive, but the Razorbacks were unable to score on the turnover and were forced to punt. The fourth quarter featured three touchdowns by the Gators. Of the Gators' 512 total yards, 246 came in the fourth quarter. The first touchdown drive started with 14:41 in the fourth. The 6 play 83-yard drive took only 2:43 and finished with a 21-yard pass to Percy Harvin from Tim Tebow—extending Florida's lead 24–7. Halfway through the fourth, the Gators initiated a 4 play 80-yard drive that ended with 75-yard rushing TD by redshirt freshman Chris Rainey. Florida's defense forced a quick 3 and out for the Hogs and the next Gator drive ended like the previous. True freshman Jeffery Demps ran 48 yards for a touchdown extending the Gators' lead, and final score, 38–7.

=== LSU ===
	1	2	3	4	Total
Tigers	0	7	7	7	21
Gators	17	3	14	17	51

This annual rivalry marked the 10th time in college football history that back-to-back champions played in the following regular season with the home team never losing. The last time this occurred was on October 20, 1990, when the 1989 champions University of Miami played the 1988 champions Notre Dame. Notre Dame beat Miami at South Bend with a score of 29–20. This game marked the 55th meeting between the Gators and Tigers with Florida leading the series 28–23–3 entering the game. Florida head coach Urban Meyer's record against LSU head coach Les Miles was 1–2 entering the game with the home team winning in each of those three games. This game marked the second of four regular season games where the Gators faced a coach that had won a national championship.

The Gators opened the game on offense and set the pace early. The first drive of the game only took 1:38 for an early score with a Percy Harvin touchdown off a tipped pass on the third play of the game. Florida's defense stopped LSU on their first possession with a quick three and out and turned the change of possession into a Gator field goal extending their lead 10–0. Their momentum continued finishing the first quarter 17–0 after a second touchdown by Percy Harvin, which was a career first for receiving TDs in a game. The Gators defense continued to pressure LSU and forced LSU QB Jarrett Lee to have a pass picked off by Florida linebacker Brandon Spikes. Although Florida wasn't able to capitalize on the turnover, LSU turned the ball over on their next possession with a Charles Scott fumble recovered by Gator AJ Jones. Florida was unable to create points with their second gained turnover. After having scored 17 points in the first quarter, the Gators were only able to put 3 points on the board in the second quarter extending their lead 20–0. With less than a minute in the first half and down 20–0, LSU put together a 60-yard drive in less than one minute scoring a touchdown with 5 seconds remaining in the half, bringing the halftime score to 20–7.

LSU opened the second half scoring a quick touchdown off of a 3-yard rush by backup QB Andrew Hatch creating a 14–0 run after a 20–0 Florida run. Florida quickly responded with a 67-yard drive taking only 8 plays capped with a Tim Tebow rushing touchdown, bringing the Gators' lead back to 13. The next offensive possession for Florida finished with another long touchdown run by true freshman Jeffery Demps. His 42-yard rushing touchdown was his fourth of the season with all four having been over 30 yards. The Gators scored on defense with a Brandon Spikes interception-returned touchdown 12 seconds into the fourth quarter building a 41–14 lead. Spikes then punted the ball into the southeast corner of the stands in celebration, drawing a 15-yard unsportsmanlike conduct penalty on the ensuing kickoff. This was Spikes second interception of the game and of his career. After a failed fourth down attempt by LSU, Florida turned the ball over back to LSU on a forced fumble on Tim Tebow. LSU scored a touchdown shortly thereafter cutting the lead to 20 with 11 minutes left in regulation and followed with a failed onside kickoff. The following Florida drive resulted in a made field goal from 25 yards. After another failed fourth down attempt on the following LSU drive, Florida marched down the field and scored their 50th point of the game with a touchdown by senior running back Kestahn Moore. The following made extra point brought the Gators lead, and final score, to 51–21. This was the first time since 1996 that the Gators scored over 50 points on LSU. The Gators ended the game with over 475 yards of offense.

Scoring summary
Q	Team	Time	Scoring play Place your pointer over the scoring play to view the drive.		Extra point	Score		
Q	Team	Time	Scoring play Place your pointer over the scoring play to view the drive.		Extra point	+	LSU	FLA
1	FLA	13:32	TD	Percy Harvin, 70 yd pass from Tim Tebow (Plays: 3 – Yards: 68 – Time: 1:38)	Jonathan Phillips kick	7	0	7
1	FLA	7:00	TD	Jonathan Phillips, 20 yd FG (Plays: 11 – Yards: 77 – Time: 5:16)		3	0	10
1	FLA	1:09	TD	Percy Harvin, 7 yd pass from Tim Tebow (Plays: 7 – Yards: 41 – Time: 4:10)	Jonathan Phillips kick	7	0	17
2	FLA	0:49	FG	Jonathan Phillips, 34 yd FG (Plays: 11 – Yards: 63 – Time: 4:38)		3	0	20
2	LSU	0:05	TD	Chris Mitchell, 6 yd pass from Jarrett Lee (Plays: 6 – Yards: 60 – Time: 0:44)	Colt David kick	7	7	20
3	LSU	8:41	TD	Andrew Hatch, 3 yd run (Plays: 12 – Yards: 80 – Time: 6:19)	Colt David kick	7	14	20
3	FLA	4:16	TD	Tim Tebow, 2 yd run (Plays: 8 – Yards: 67 – Time: 4:25)	Jonathan Phillips kick	7	14	27
3	FLA	1:02	TD	Jeffery Demps, 42 yd run (Plays: 2 – Yards: 60 – Time: 2:14)	Jonathan Phillips kick	7	14	34
4	FLA	14:48	FG	Brandon Spikes, 52 yd interception return (INT thrown by Jarrett Lee)	Jonathan Phillips kick	7	14	41
4	LSU	11:10	TD	Richard Dickson, 6 yd pass from Jarrett Lee (Plays: 5 – Yards: 49 – Time: 1:22)	Colt David kick	7	21	41
4	FLA	1:37	FG	Jonathan Phillips, 25 yd FG (Plays: 8 – Yards: 35 – Time: 4:23)		3	21	44
4	FLA	1:37	TD	Kestahn Moore, 2 yd run (Plays: 5 – Yards: 60 – Time: 2:45)	Jonathan Phillips kick	7	21	51

=== Kentucky ===
Kentucky at Florida

Team	1	2	3	4	Total
Kentucky	0	3	0	2	5
• Florida	28	14	14	7	63

- Date: October 25
- Location: Ben Hill Griffin Stadium, Gainesville, Florida
- Game attendance: 90,589

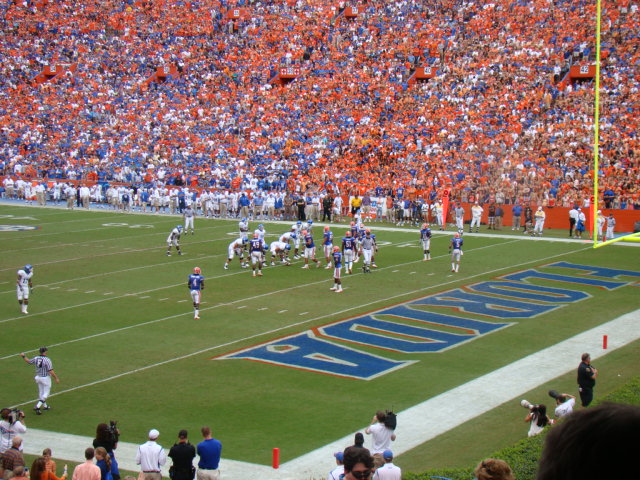

Homecoming for the Gators featured an early match up with division rival Kentucky. The Gators entered the game with a 21-game winning streak against the Wildcats. The second longest active streak against an annual opponent in the NCAA. Second only to Tennessee's streak over Kentucky as well. The last time the Wildcats defeated the Gators was in Lexington in a 10–3 loss during the 1986 season. The Gators last lost at home to the Wildcats on November 17, 1979, in a blowout fashion–31 to 3. These two teams met last in Gainesville during the 2006 season, where the Gators defeated the Wildcats 26–7. Florida enters the game leading the series 40–17–0 and the Wildcats have defeated the Gators only 3 times in the series when the Gators were ranked.

The Gators opened the game strong with 28 points scored in the first quarter. The Gators' special teams blocked two punts on Kentucky's first and second drives of the game. The Gators scored touchdowns on each blocked punt with Tim Tebow running in the first touchdown and Brandon James for the second. The Gators' third scoring drive of the game only took four plays and 1:39 finishing with a 16-yard Percy Harvin rushing TD. Percy Harvin scored the fourth Florida TD of the quarter off of another 4-play drive, but this time through the air. Before the end of the first half, the Gators' special teams blocked a Wildcat field goal attempt, which was returned by the Gators' safety Major Wright to the Florida 40-yard line. Tim Tebow then threw his second TD shortly into the second quarter to Jeff Demps. Kentucky got on the board with a field goal with 5:03 left in the half. Florida responded quickly with a 3-yard TD rush by Tim Tebow, bringing the score at the half 42–3. This was his second rushing TD of the game, which tied former Florida Gator running back Emmitt Smith with a school record 36 rushing touchdowns.

Florida opened the second half on defense with Gator DB Ahmad Black scoring a TD on an interception 9 seconds into the half. Florida's defense continued to keep Kentucky out of scoring position allowing the Gators to pile on the points. The next Florida drive consumed over eight minutes resulting in senior RB Kestahn Moore running in a TD increasing the lead 56 to 3. After this drive, redshirt freshman John Brantley took over the reins as QB. Three minutes into the fourth quarter, John Brantley threw a 38-yard TD pass to David Nelson. This was John Brantley's first passing touchdown as a Gator as well as David Nelson's first reception of the year. Kentucky's following drive brought them within 5 yards of a touchdown. Florida's defense forced Kentucky into a fourth down attempt. With only a couple yards to gain, Florida Gator Lorenzo Edwards forced a turnover on downs stopping Kentucky half a yard short from the first down marker. On the following drive, Florida's Bobby Kane mishandled the punt snap sending the ball out of the endzone resulting in a safety. This was the last score of the game, bringing the final score to 63–5. Florida's winning streak over the Wildcats extended to 22 straight victories, tying Tennessee's record over Kentucky.

=== Georgia ===
Florida vs. Georgia

Team	1	2	3	4	Total
• Florida	7	7	21	14	49
Georgia	0	3	0	7	10

- Location: Jacksonville, Florida

The 2008 Georgia–Florida game, which Georgia lost 49–10.

The Gators faced off against the Bulldogs in the annual rivalry taking place in Jacksonville, Florida. Georgia led the series entering the game 45–38–2. Florida had won 15 of the last 18 meetings dating back to the 1990 season, which was Steve Spurrier's first season as head coach. Urban Meyer was 2–1 against Georgia before the game with his only loss coming the previous year in a 42–30 win over the Gators. In that win, Knowshon Moreno's one-yard touchdown run in the first quarter sparked a celebration by the entire Bulldogs team in the end zone, known as the "Gator Stomp." Georgia head coach Mark Richt defended his actions in having his team intentionally celebrate. He was quoted as saying "I wanted to make sure we left this game with our hearts on the field." He was later quoted in summer media presses: "In hindsight, I shouldn't have done it. I won't do anything like that again. It could have easily turned into a big, stupid brawl."

The Bulldogs started the game on offense after Florida deferred to the second half. Neither team was able to score on their opening possessions as both defenses force the teams to punt. Georgia was able to get into the red zone and attempted a field goal from the 20-yard line, which was missed by kicker Blair Walsh. On the change of possession, the Gators capitalized with a 5-minute 80-yard drive finished off with a Percy Harvin rushing touchdown. With this touchdown, Percy scored a TD in every game thus far in the season. Florida's defense shut out Georgia in the first quarter, but Georgia was able to put points on the board with a 35-yard field goal cutting Florida's lead to 4. Georgia attempted an onside kick following the score, but was unable to recover the ball setting up the Gators at the Georgia 41-yard line. It took only 7 plays for Tim Tebow to cap the drive with a 1-yard rushing touchdown, bringing the score to 14–3. Florida's defense kept Georgia QB Matthew Stafford and Georgia RB Knowshon Moreno out of the end zone after Georgia got to the Florida 10-yard line. After having to settle for another field goal attempt, Georgia kicker Blair Walsh missed his second of the game. Neither the Gators nor the Bulldogs were able to score anymore in the half, bringing the score to 14–3 at the half.

After having to punt on the opening possession of the second half for the Gators, the Florida defense quickly gave the ball back into the hands of Tim Tebow. Florida sophomore cornerback Joe Haden intercepted a Matthew Stafford pass and returned it 88 yards to the Georgia 1-yard line. Tim Tebow scored a TD on the resulting run extending Florida's lead to 21–3. Georgia continued to struggle on offense and their next drive resulted in a punt. Tim Tebow connected with senior WR Louis Murphy on a 44-yard pass to bring the score to 28–3 with a little more than 5 minutes remaining in the third quarter. Turnovers continued with Georgia after Knowshon Moreno fumbled the ball, which was picked up by Florida DT Terron Sanders. Tim Tebow ran the ball in for a touchdown on the following change of possession—his third rushing TD of the game and 40th of his career. Matthew Stafford's turnovers continued with back-to-back interceptions by Gator linebacker Dustin Doe and Gator safety Ahmad Black. While unable to capitalize on the Dustin Doe interception, the Gators scored a TD off of Ahmad Black's interception with only one play, a 25-yard Tim Tebow pass to Percy Harvin. The lead extended to 42–3 at this point. Redshirt freshman quarterback John Brantley took over the offense in the fourth quarter for Tim Tebow. John Brantley and the Gators put together a 66-yard drive finishing with a touchdown pass to redshirt freshman WR Deonte Thompson. The Gators lead extended to a game high 46 points, 49–3, with still half of a quarter to play. After replacing Matthew Stafford with quarterback Joe Cox, the Bulldogs were able to score a touchdown with a little more than 3 minutes left in regulation. This would bring the final score to 49–10. Although the Gators finished the game with 25 less yards of offense (398 vs. 373), the Gators were able to force four turnovers (1 fumble, 3 interceptions) and capitalized off of them. Presumably as revenge for the 2007 Bulldog celebration, Meyer used up his timeouts in the last minute of the fourth quarter.

=== Vanderbilt ===
Florida at Vanderbilt

Team	1	2	3	4	Total
• Florida	21	14	7	0	42
Vanderbilt	0	0	7	7	14

- Location: Vanderbilt Stadium, Nashville, Tennessee

This is the first time the Gators have returned to Nashville after winning the 2006 National Championship. The 2006 game in Nashville ended closely—25 to 19—and the last three games in Nashville were won by the Gators by an average of only 9 points. Entering the 2008 game, the Gators have outscored opponents an average of 50 to 10 since the Gators loss to Ole Miss earlier in the year. With a win in this game, the Gators would clinch the SEC East division title and a berth in the SEC championship game. Florida enters the game having won 17 straight games over Vanderbilt. Their last loss occurring in Nashville in 1988 where the Gators lost by a score of 24–9.

The Gators opened strong on defense forcing an early three-and-out by Vanderbilt followed by a tipped punt. The Gators' first offensive drive only had to travel 60 yards resulting in a Tim Tebow touchdown pass to wide receiver Louis Murphy while in the red zone. Coming into the game, the Gators had the #1 red-zone scoring offense in the nation with Vanderbilt ranked #2 in redzone defense. The Gators defense forced another three-and-out on Vanderbilt's second offensive drive. Coming into the game, the Gators ranked #16 in the nation in total defense. The Gators' second offensive drive ended in another touchdown. This time, Tim Tebow carried the ball three consecutive times with the third, and final rush, resulting in a touchdown. This was Tim Tebow's 40th rushing touchdown of his career. Extending his school-record for rushing touchdowns in a career at the University of Florida. Vanderbilt's third possession resulted in an interception by Gator DB Ahmad Black. His 5th, and team-leading, interception of the season. Vanderbilt continued to struggle on offense as well as defense as Florida continued to put points on the scoreboard early in the game setting the tone. Tim Tebow added his second rushing TD of the game after the interception after stiff arming a Vanderbilt defender to push his way into the endzone. After another failed drive for Vanderbilt on offense, their punt was blocked by Florida Gator Carlos Dunlap. The resulting field position yielded a quick scoring drive ending with a touchdown pass by Tim Tebow to Riley Cooper. The Gators fifth offensive possession ended with a questionable fumble call. Percy Harvin rushed the ball for a touchdown with the ball appearing to have crossed the plane of the endzone and then coming loose and picked up by a Vanderbilt defender. After review, the fumble call was confirmed. This was the second redzone drive of the season the Gators did not score. The other being a taken-knee at the end of the Tennessee game. Even with the missed points on the possession, the Gators quickly scored on their sixth possession of the half with a touchdown pass by Tim Tebow.

The Gators opened the second half on offense and continued to rack up the points. The drive ended with a touchdown run by WR Percy Harvin. In this game, Percy Harvin set a school record for rushing yards by a wide receiver. Chris Nickson took over as quarterback for Vanderbilt after Mackenzie Adams left the field due to injury at the end of the second quarter. With 1:04 remaining in the 3rd quarter, Vanderbilt prevented a shutout and scored a touchdown with a Nickson pass. With under a minute to go in the third, redshirt freshman Gator QB John Brantley took control of the offense. Tim Tebow finished three quarters with three passing TDs and two rushing TDs. His second week in a row with 5 total TDs. This win over Vanderbilt clinched the SEC East Division championship for the Gators sending them back to the SEC Championship Game in Atlanta since the 2006 season. They will face the Alabama Crimson Tide after they clinched their division title earlier in the day against rival LSU.

=== South Carolina ===
South Carolina at Florida

Team	1	2	3	4	Total
S. Carolina	0	3	3	0	6
• Florida	21	7	14	14	56

- Location: Ben Hill Griffin Stadium, Gainesville, Florida

This game marked the 12th time the Gamecocks have traveled to Gainesville where they were winless on the road (0–11) coming into the game. The last time the two teams met in Gainesville, the Gamecocks nearly earned their first victory against the Gators in the Swamp, but fell short with a field goal attempt blocked by Jarvis Moss with only a few seconds left in the game. History was also made in this game with it being the first college football game where a Heisman-winning coach (Steve Spurrier) coached against a Heisman-winning player (Tim Tebow). Both Heisman winners also earned their Heisman trophies at the University of Florida. This was only the fourth time in college football history that two Heisman winners faced one another. South Carolina is the third team of the season the Gators have played against that was coached by a previous championship-winning head coach (Phillip Fulmer of Tennessee and Les Miles of LSU being the other two).

With afternoon showers rolling through Gainesville, field conditions weren't ideal for either team early on. The Gamecocks first drive ended after just four plays resulting in a punt. As Florida drove down the field on the following possession, true freshman Jeff Demps fumbled the ball near the South Carolina 40-yard line. Carolina's and Florida's offensives woes continued in each of their next drives, with a South Carolina QB Chris Smelley pass being intercepted and returned for a touchdown by Brandon Spikes. Similar to the prior week, South Carolina head coach and Florida alum Steve Spurrier rotated quarterbacks after nearly every offensive snap. On the following South Carolina offensive possession, Gator safety Ahmad Black intercepted another Chris Smelley pass after it was deflected by Gator linebacker Brandon Hicks. This was Black's sixth, and team-leading, interception of the season. It only took one offensive play for the Gators to capitalize on the Carolina turnover. Percy Harvin ran the ball for 26 yards resulting in a touchdown extending the Gators' lead 14–0 late in the first quarter. South Carolina continued to make mistakes. On the following kickoff, the South Carolina returner threw a lateral pass to his teammate who fumbled the catch. Florida senior long snapper James Smith collected the ball and ran it just one foot shy of the goal line. Tim Tebow ran the ball in for a touchdown on the resulting change of possession. Florida's 21 points were off of 3 South Carolina turnovers and only took 2:15 to score.

After a South Carolina forced-fumble in the first quarter, their defense picked up their second fumble on a fumbled Tebow option-pass to Chris Rainey near the South Carolina redzone. Although South Carolina's defense had spent little time on the field, they were productive in collecting two early Florida fumbles. With South Carolina's offense struggling and unable to put points on the board, Florida regained possession after forcing a punt and quickly scored with a Tebow touchdown pass to redshirt freshman Deonte Thompson. After failed offensive drives for both teams, South Carolina was able to put together enough of an offense to attempt, and make, a field goal. This brought the score to 28–3 at the half.

Florida received the ball in the second half and on the first offensive play for the Gators, Percy Harvin ran the ball 80 yards for a touchdown. This was Percy's second rushing TD of the game. The Gators crossed the 30-point mark on this score, which was the first time in Gator history that the Gators scored 30+ points in every regular season SEC game. On the following offensive drive for South Carolina, Steve Spurrier ditched the two-QB calls and left Chris Smelley in to take all snaps on the drive. South Carolina moved down the field effectively compared to the first half. After moving the ball down the field, South Carolina attempted, and made, a 44-yard field goal with 10:17 remaining in the third quarter. Florida responded with a drive that took less than four minutes and topped off with a 38-yard Jeff Demps rushing touchdown. This was Jeff Demps' fifth rushing touchdown of the season, all of which were runs of more than 35 yards. On the first play of the fourth quarter, Tim Tebow threw a TD pass to TE Aaron Hernandez, who controlled the catch with one hand, extending their lead 49–6. On the following Gator offensive possession, redshirt freshman QB John Brantley took over for Tim Tebow to close out the game. Florida's defense still did not let up. True freshman Gator Will Hill picked off a Stephen Garcia pass attempt making it the third Gator interception of the game. This turnover led to another Gator score when true freshman Chris Rainey put together two runs with the second being the touchdown score that put the Gators over the 50-point mark. The Gators finished the game holding South Carolina's offense to 173 yards while the Gator offense amassed over 519 yards with 346 of those yards coming on the ground.

=== The Citadel ===
The Citadel at Florida

Team	1	2	3	4	Total
Citadel	0	6	7	6	19
• Florida	21	28	14	7	70

- Location: Ben Hill Griffin Stadium, Gainesville, Florida

This game marked Senior day for the Gators as they played their final home game of the 2008 season in the Swamp. It also featured the retirement of Citadel graduate and UF legend George Edmondson better known as "Mr. Two Bits" to Gator fans. This was the only game of the season where the Gators faced a Division I-FCS opponent. The first meeting between these two teams took place in 1910 where the Gators defeated the Bulldogs 6–2 in Jacksonville. The most recent meeting between the two teams took place as the season opener for the 1998 season where the Gators remained undefeated against the Bulldogs, winning 49–10. Florida scored 42 points in six straight games, a record unmatched by a conference member since Vanderbilt in 1915.

The Gators defense took control of the game early shortly after The Citadel received the opening kickoff. True freshman cornerback Janoris Jenkins picked off a Bart Blanchard pass and took it into Bulldogs territory. The Gators got on the board shortly thereafter with a Tim Tebow touchdown pass to senior WR Louis Murphy. After a 3 and out forced by the Gators' defense, the Gators put together a 61-yard drive in 1:25 capped off with a Chris Rainey touchdown run. The Gators third touchdown of the quarter came on the 5th play of their next offensive possession ending with a Tim Tebow 43-yard touchdown pass to Riley Cooper. With another 3 and out at the end of the first quarter, the Citadel was forced to punt. Starting at the Florida 11-yard line, the Gators managed to go 89 yards down the field and score a touchdown off of a Percy Harvin 11-yard run. Offensive struggles continued for the Bulldogs as true freshman DB Will Hill intercepted a pass by Cam Turner. Tim Tebow's final touchdown of the day was a 31-yard pass to redshirt freshman Deonte Thompson. This TD brought the score to 35–0 with over 13 minutes remaining in the half. Florida's next offensive possession ended like the previous five with a touchdown scored—this time by senior RB Kestahn Moore. The Gators' defense was unable to field a shutout when the Bulldogs responded with a 78-yard drive, finishing with a TD pass by Scott Flanagan—cutting the score 42–6 after a missed extra point. Shortly before the half, senior Kestahn Moore was able to rush for his second TD of the game, this time from 22 yards out. This brought the halftime score to 49–6.

The Gators opened the second half with the ball, but weren't as dominant as they were in the first half. Redshirt freshman QB John Brantley took snaps in place of Tim Tebow and was able to put together a touchdown scoring drive. This one ended with a 1-yard rushing TD by Florida defensive tackle Javier Estopinan, extending the lead to 56–6. The Citadel's response mirrored the Gators' drive in that it, too, ended with a 1-yard rushing TD, bringing the score to 56–13 after the made extra point. The Gators broke the 60-point mark after quarterback John Brantley completed a 12-yard pass to redshirt junior WR David Nelson, extending the Gators' lead to 50. The Gator defense continued to perform well as defensive standout Carlos Dunlap, the season leader in sacks, sacked Citadel's Cam Turner, forcing the Bulldogs to punt. On the following drive, redshirt sophomore RB Emmanuel Moody, transfer from USC, would run the ball in 5 yards for the TD. This would be the Gators' last score of the game, eclipsing the 70-point mark. Turnovers continued for the Bulldogs with their next drive ending with a Cam Turner pass intercepted by Wondy Pierre-Louis. The final score of the game came off of a Cam Turner pass to Taylor Cornett for a 15-yard touchdown reception, bringing the final score to 70–19 after the Citadel missed their second extra point of the game. The Gators' offense collected 705 total yards, with 394 coming on the ground. The Citadel had 3 turnovers in the game, all of which were interceptions. The Gators had 13 drives on offense, 10 of which ended with touchdowns. Two drives ended the first half and second half and the Gators punted the ball only once.

=== Florida State ===
Florida at Florida State

Team	1	2	3	4	Total
• Florida	14	14	10	7	45
FSU	3	6	6	0	15

- Location: Doak Campbell Stadium, Tallahassee, Florida

The final game of the regular season for the Florida Gators featured a matchup against in-state rival Florida State in Tallahassee, Florida. The last meeting between these two teams took place in the Swamp in 2007 with the Gators defeating the Seminoles 45–12. This game was the 53rd meeting between the two teams with the Gators leading the series 31–19–2 entering the game. This was Bobby Bowden's 36th game against the Gators. Coming into the game, Coach Bowden's record was 17–16–2. The Gators last loss to the Seminoles occurred during the 2003 season at home on senior day. This game marked the fourth and final regular season contest in which the Gators faced a team led by a national championship-winning head coach. (Though they would face two more in the SEC and BCS championship games.)

Florida received the ball the start the game and was able to score on their opening drive. Ending the 65-yard drive, WR Percy Harvin ran the ball from 11 yards out to score a touchdown—this completed his streak of scoring a TD in every game of the regular season. Florida State was able to establish excellent field position by returning a Caleb Sturgis kickoff to the Florida 24-yard line. Florida's defense was able to prevent the Seminoles from scoring a TD and forced them to settle for a field goal; cutting the Gators' lead 7–3. After forcing a punt, the Seminoles regained possession, but put the ball back in Florida's hands. Florida safety Major Wright grabbed his third interception of the season picking off FSU QB Christian Ponder. Florida was able to capitalize on the turnover and score with a Tim Tebow touchdown pass to TE Aaron Hernandez. This completed the first quarter scoring with the Gators leading 14–3. After forcing Florida State to punt the ball early in the second quarter, true freshman RB Jeffery Demps of the Gators fumbled the ball during a run play, which was collected by Florida State's Neefy Moffett. This set the Seminoles in the red zone having the ball at the Florida 14-yard line. Just as in the first quarter, the Gators defense was able to prevent the Seminoles from scoring a touchdown and forced them to settle for another field goal—cutting the lead to 14–6. In response, the Gators put together a 10 play drive consuming 86 yards of the field ending with a 4-yard rushing touchdown by Tim Tebow over a pile of FSU defenders, bringing the score to 21–6 in favor of the Gators. With little working on offense, the Seminoles once again settled for a field goal on their following possession, their third of the game. With only 2:04 left in the half, Florida's offense was able to connect on 5 consecutive pass plays, ending with a 24-yard touchdown pass to TE Aaron Hernandez in only 1:07. This brought the score at the half to 28–9. The Gators amassed 284 yards of offense in the first half.

The second half opened with a Florida State turnover as their woes continued on offense with Florida's defense continuing to force mistakes. Florida middle linebacker intercepted a Christian Ponder pass on the first play of the half and set up the Gators' offense at the Florida State 20-yard line. With just three plays in 40 seconds, the Gators tacked on another touchdown with a Tim Tebow 23-yard touchdown pass to senior WR Louis Murphy. This brought the Gators' lead to 26 with a score of 35 to 9. After a three and out forced by the Florida defense, the Gators were able to score again, but only with their first field goal of the game. On the ensuing Florida State drive, former starting FSU QB Drew Weatherford stood in for Christian Ponder and led his team on a touchdown drive capped off with a Jermaine Thomas 4-yard touchdown run. The blocked extra point left the score at 38–15. Neither team was able to score any additional points in the third quarter and the Gators took their 23-point lead to the final quarter. Less than three minutes into the fourth quarter, Gators' true freshman Janoris Jenkins picked off his third interception of the season by reading a D'Vontrey Richardson pass intended for Bert Reed at the FSU 38-yard line. As done earlier in the game, the Gators capitalized off the turnover and scored a TD—this time in only three plays ending with a Jeffery Demps two-yard touchdown run. This would be the final score of the game with the Gators leading 45–15 with a little less than 12 minutes remaining. Redshirt freshman QB John Brantley took snaps for Tim Tebow to close out the game and the Florida defense continued to stop Florida State with sacks on the final two FSU offensive possessions by Carlos Dunlap and Jaye Howard. The final sack of the game by Jaye Howard also caused a fumble by Drew Weatherford, which Jaye Howard was able to recover. The Gators finished with over 502 yards of offense; more than double FSU's 242 yards. The Gator defense had 4 turnovers gained with three of them being interceptions. This win extending Florida's winning streak over the Seminoles to five dating back to the 2004 win in Tallahassee. In this game, Gator WR Percy Harvin suffered an injury that would prevent him from playing the SEC Championship Game the following week.

During a game in Tallahassee, rainy conditions resulted in a wet and slippery field. On a 4-yard touchdown run, Tim Tebow slid on the turf, which caused red paint to transfer onto the front of his white jersey. The paint also marked his face and helmet and remained there for most of the game. The appearance of the paint was compared to blood by observers and was associated with his sideline celebrations. The image of the stained jersey became a recognized visual from that season and decade.

=== SEC Championship ===
SEC Championship Game: Alabama Crimson Tide (12–0) vs. Florida Gators (11–1)

Quarter	1	2	3	4	Total
Alabama	10	0	10	0	20
Florida	7	10	0	14	31

at Georgia Dome • Atlanta, Georgia

- Date: December 6
- Game time: 4:00 p.m. EDT
- Game weather: Indoors (dome)
- Game attendance: 75,892
- Referee: Thomas Ritter
- TV announcers (CBS): Verne Lundquist, (play-by-play), Gary Danielson (analyst) and Tracy Wolfson (sideline)
- Scoring Summary Final

Game information

Alabama

- John Parker Wilson
  12/25, 187 Yds, INT
- Glen Coffee
  21 Rush, 112 Yds, TD
- Julio Jones
  5 Rec, 124 Yds

Florida

- Tim Tebow
  14/22, 216 Yds, 3 TD
  17 Rush, 57 Yds
- Louis Murphy
  4 Rec, 86 Yds

The Florida Gators returned to the Georgia Dome after two years to play against #1 Alabama for the SEC title. This was the Gators' second visit to the SEC Championship Game since the 2006 game where they faced the SEC West champion Arkansas. The 2007 season SEC East representative in the title game was the Tennessee Volunteers. Alabama returns to the SEC Championship Game after a nine-year appearance drought. In the 1999 SEC Championship Game, the Crimson Tide defeated the Gators with a score of 34 to 7. Florida's last win over the Tide in the title game occurred in the 1996 SEC Championship Game where the Gators would end up playing Florida State in the Sugar Bowl and go on to win their first national championship. This game is Florida's ninth appearance in the game and have a record of 6–2 before kickoff. Alabama is 2–3 entering the game with their two wins over the Florida Gators in 1992—the first year of the championship game—and 1999. Alabama entered the game having been ranked #1 in the AP and USA Today Coaches poll for five consecutive weeks while the Gators entered the game ranked #2 in the AP Poll. This was the first time that the AP #1 and #2 teams have faced in the SEC title game. This was Urban Meyer's first time coaching against Nick Saban as well as the first meeting between the two programs since their regular season meeting in 2006 season where the Gators defeated the Tide and then went on to win the BCS National Championship. This was the fifth game of the season where the Gators faced a team coached by a national championship winning head coach. Alabama entered the game with a 21–13 series lead over the Gators.

After winning the coin toss, the Gators elected to defer to the second half and the Alabama offense took the field after the touchback kickoff. With just three plays and one net yard, the Gators defense forced Alabama to punt early. Although without leading Gator WR Percy Harvin, who sustained an injury during the Florida State game, the Gators acted quickly and put together a nine play drive that finished with a Tim Tebow touchdown pass to first year Gator WR Carl Moore. This was Carl Moore's first career touchdown reception as a Gator. The Florida defense wasn't as effective on the second Alabama possession as Alabama true freshman WR Julio Jones made a 64-yard reception ending at the Florida 18-yard line. The next play resulted in a touchdown after an 18-yard run by Tide RB Glen Coffee. It only took two plays and 54 seconds for the Tide to tie the game at 7–7. After the Crimson Tide forced a 3 and out on the Florida offense, Alabama's offense led by senior QB John Parker Wilson were unable to score another touchdown, but settled for a field goal after getting into Florida territory with Javier Arenas' punt return. This gave the Tide the first lead of the game, 10–7, and this was the Gators' first time trailing in the first quarter since their loss at home to Ole Miss earlier in the season. After another 3 and out for the Florida offense, the first quarter came to a close with the Tide maintaining their lead. Alabama opened the second quarter on offense and were able to move the ball 40 yards to the Florida 32 and elected to go for the first down on 4th and 9. Alabama's P.J. Fitzgerald was only able to gain one yard and the Gators gained possession of the ball with the turnover on downs. On the ensuing drive, Florida tied the game with a 19-yard field goal after getting as close as the 2-yard line. This tied the game at 10–10. Florida's defense was able to stop Alabama on the following drive after only three plays and the Gators regained possession a little less than half of the quarter remaining. The Gators were able to regain the lead after a Tim Tebow touchdown pass to junior WR David Nelson. This brought the score at halftime to 17–10.

The Gators received the ball to start the second half and were unable to move the ball having to punt after just three plays on offense. The third quarter would turn out to be difficult for the Gator defense and the Tide scored on their first two possessions on offense in the half. Their first offensive possession totaled 91 yards and consumed nearly 7 minutes off of the game clock. John Parker Wilson was 4 of 6 passing in the drive with 3 of his passes connecting with freshman WR Julio Jones. Alabama RB Mark Ingram finished the drive with a 2-yard rushing touchdown tying the game at 17–17. Florida's offense struggled on their next possession as they were forced to attempt a field goal. Florida kicker Jonathan Phillips had the opportunity to give the lead back to the Gators, but missed a 42-yard field goal. To close out the third quarter, Alabama was able to get the ball into Florida territory where they attempted, and made, a 27-yard field goal. This gave the Tide a three-point lead—20–17—entering the fourth quarter. The Gators started on offense in the fourth quarter and drive deep into Alabama territory. Florida ran the ball 8 times out of 11 plays, with the final rush being a touchdown from 1 yard out run in by true freshman Jeffery Demps. The Gators would take the lead following the extra point and would not give it back. Florida's defense proved to be more effective in the fourth quarter than they were in the third. Florida defensive end Jermaine Cunningham sacked Alabama's John Parker Wilson for 11 yards forcing Alabama to punt the ball. With the ball in the hands of the Florida offense, the Gators had the opportunity to take a two-score lead with a touchdown. They were able to get to the 1 yard line setting a 2nd and Goal situation, but Florida received a 5-yard penalty for sideline interference. On the second play following the penalty, Tim Tebow threw a touchdown pass to Riley Cooper to extend the Gators' lead and final score margin by 11–31 to 20. Alabama's response on the following drive was quickly quieted. On a 1st and 10, senior QB John Parker Wilson was intercepted by sophomore corner Joe Haden. The Gators ran out the clock after regaining possession and defeated the Crimson Tide by a score of 31–20 for the SEC Championship.

This was the Gators' seventh victory in the SEC championship game and Urban Meyer's second SEC title since becoming the head coach of the team in 2005. This was the Florida Gator's eighth officially recognized title with the first occurring in 1991 before the formation of the Championship Game. With the win over #1 Alabama, the Gators were selected to play in the BCS National Championship Game the following day where they would face against the Oklahoma Sooners.

Scoring summary

Quarter	Time	Drive			Team	Scoring information	Score	
Quarter	Time	Plays	Yards	TOP	Team	Scoring information	ALA	FLA
1	8:17	9	59	4:28	Florida	Carl Moore 3-yard touchdown reception from Tim Tebow, Jonathan Phillips kick good	0	7
1	7:23	2	82	0:54	Alabama	Glen Coffee 18-yard touchdown run, Leigh Tiffin kick good	7	7
1	3:28	5	12	2:15	Alabama	30-yard field goal by Leigh Tiffin	10	7
2	8:59	8	67	3:51	Florida	19-yard field goal by Jonathan Phillips	10	10
2	2:59	9	57	4:20	Florida	David Nelson 5-yard touchdown reception from Tim Tebow, Jonathan Phillips kick good	10	17
3	6:20	15	91	6:53	Alabama	Mark Ingram 2-yard touchdown run, Leigh Tiffin kick good	17	17
3	0:08	10	65	3:40	Alabama	27-yard field goal by Leigh Tiffin	20	17
4	9:21	11	62	5:47	Florida	Jeff Demps 1-yard touchdown run, Jonathan Phillips kick good	20	24
4	2:50	8	65	4:37	Florida	Riley Cooper 5-yard touchdown reception from Tim Tebow, Jonathan Phillips kick good	20	31
"TOP" = time of possession. For other American football terms, see Glossary of American football.							20	31

=== BCS National Championship ===
BCS National Championship

Team	1	2	3	4	Total
• Florida	0	7	7	10	24
Oklahoma	0	7	0	7	14

- Date: January 8, 2009
- Location: Dolphin Stadium, Miami Gardens, Florida
- Game start: 8:00 p.m. ET
- Game attendance: 78,468
- Game weather: 68 °F (20 °C) (Clear)
- Referee: Ron Cherry (ACC)
- TV announcers: Thom Brennaman (play–by–play), Charles Davis (color commentator)

Scoring summary
2	FLA	Louis Murphy 20-yard pass from Tim Tebow (Jonathan Phillips kick) (12 plays, 86 yards in 1:20)	FLA 7–0
2	OKLA	Jermaine Gresham 6-yard pass from Sam Bradford (Jimmy Stevens kick) (6 plays, 65 yards in 2:13)	7–7
3	FLA	Percy Harvin 2-yard rush (Jonathan Phillips kick) (13 plays, 75 yards in 5:22)	FLA 14–7
4	OKLA	Jermaine Gresham 11-yard pass from Sam Bradford (Jimmy Stevens kick) (8 plays, 77 yards in 2:36)	14–14
4	FLA	Jonathan Phillips 27-yard field goal (6 plays, 68 yards in 1:28)	FLA 17–14
4	FLA	David Nelson 4-yard pass from Tim Tebow (Jonathan Phillips kick) (11 plays, 76 yards in 6:52)	FLA 24–14

The Gators closed out the 2008 season against the Oklahoma Sooners for the 2008 BCS National Championship in Miami, Florida. Although this was the first time the two teams had played one another, there was familiarity between the two programs. Oklahoma head coach Bob Stoops played a critical role as defensive coordinator for the Florida Gators during the first national championship run in 1996. In addition, Florida Gators quarterback Tim Tebow and Oklahoma Sooners quarterback Sam Bradford met the previous month in New York for the Heisman Award ceremony where Sam Bradford took home the honors. Even though Tim Tebow received the most first-place votes, 309, to Sam Bradford's 300, he finished third in the final balloting, being surpassed by both Sam Bradford and Texas' quarterback Colt McCoy. Florida's staff also suffered an employment change when Offensive Coordinator Dan Mullen accepted the head coaching position at Mississippi State University replacing Sylvester Croom who resigned. Urban Meyer named Steve Addazio as the offensive coordinator shortly thereafter, but Dan Mullen would still coach in the game. Entering the game, Florida head coach Urban Meyer was 2–0 in BCS bowl games with his win as head coach at Utah in the 2005 Fiesta Bowl and his second win coming two years ago to the day against Ohio State in the 2007 BCS National Championship Game. Oklahoma head coach Bob Stoops made his fourth appearance in the BCS national championship game. His first visit was to the same stadium where his Sooners defeated the Florida State Seminoles 13–2 in the 2001 Orange Bowl. However, the Sooners' last two appearances in the title game ended in defeat, losing at the hands of LSU in the 2004 Sugar Bowl and USC in the 2005 Orange Bowl. In addition, the Sooners lost two more BCS bowl games following their loss to USC. Those were to the Boise State Broncos in the 2007 Fiesta Bowl and the West Virginia Mountaineers in the 2008 Fiesta Bowl. Bob Stoops and the Sooners looked to snap a four-game BCS bowl losing streak and Urban Meyer and the Gators aimed to add their third national championship in school history, and their second in three years.

After winning the coin toss, the Oklahoma Sooners elected to receive the ball and put the Gators on defense to start the game. Oklahoma started the game at the Sooner 24 yard line and was only able to gain 31 yards on 8 plays before having to punt the ball to the Gators. This was a rare punt by the Sooners this season, with the team breaking an NCAA record for most points scored in a season with over 700. The Gators' first offensive possession ended in just 8 plays similar to the Sooners', but this one finishing on a Tim Tebow interception. Coming into the game, Tim Tebow only had thrown two interceptions all year. Fortunately for the Gators, the Sooners were unable to capitalize off of the rare Florida turnover. Before the start of the game, the Sooners led the NCAA FBS with the fewest turnovers in a game with 9. The Gators were tied for second with only 11 turnovers. Florida's second offensive possession was more productive with the Gators getting to the Oklahoma 21 yard line by the end of the first quarter. This brought the score at the end of the quarter to 0–0. This was the first time in the Sooners' season where they were unable to score in the first quarter.

The Sooners had scored an average of over 50 points per game and the Gators over 40 points per game, but neither was able to put points on the board. However, needing only three plays in the second quarter, the Gators scored a touchdown with a pass from Tim Tebow to senior WR Louis Murphy, who managed to get the ball over the goal line with his right hand prior to fumbling. This gave the Gators the lead, 7–0. In response, the Sooners put together a drive initiated with three running plays by RB Chris Brown totaling 45 yards. The next two plays capped off the drive with a Sooner touchdown tying the game at 7–7 and taking only 2:13 to respond. The Gators received the ball with 11:49 left in the half and were able to move the ball 21 yards to the Florida 36 where Tim Tebow threw his second interception of the game and this one to Sooners' defensive standout Gerald McCoy—Big 12 defensive player of the year. The Sooners' ensuing drive called for four running plays by RB Chris Brown who was able to take the ball one yard shy of the goal line on a 4th and goal. The Sooners elected to go for the touchdown, but were stopped at the 3 yard line by Florida DT Torrey Davis. Florida's offense stuttered on their next possession and eventually punted the ball back to Oklahoma who had 2:32 left in the first half. Sam Bradford led his team down the field and in scoring position with a 1st and Goal at the Florida 6-yard line. Sam Bradford's following pass was tipped by Florida DB Joe Haden and intercepted by Florida safety Major Wright. This was the third interception of the game; the first for Sam Bradford in the game. The Gators took a knee to close out the half tied 7–7.

The Gators opened the second half on offense, but struggled to move the ball and were forced to punt back to Oklahoma after a 3 and out. The Sooners didn't fare much better on their opening possession of the half. After just nine plays, Oklahoma punted the ball back to Florida where the Gators would start a drive taking over 5 minutes. Starting at the Florida 25-yard line, the Gators moved the ball effectively, needing only three plays to get to midfield. On a 2nd and 4 at the Oklahoma 13, true freshman RB Jeffery Demps ran the ball to the 2-yard line before Oklahoma was called for a facemask while tackling Demps. This put the ball at the 1-yard line and the Gators had a fresh set of downs on which to score. After failing to run the ball in from one yard, Tim Tebow attempted a pass to TE Aaron Hernandez, which was nearly caught. The next play called was a direct snap to WR Percy Harvin, who made his first appearance since getting injured against Florida State two games earlier. Harvin was able to rush from two yards out and score a TD, putting the Gators up 14–7. Oklahoma's following drive did not move as much down the field as their previous drives. On the first play of the drive, Dustin Doe and Carlos Dunlap sacked Sam Bradford, dropping him for a four-yard loss. After getting to the Florida 32-yard line, the Sooners attempted a field goal, which was blocked by the Gators. After the change of possession, the Gators went 3 and out to close the third quarter. The Gators entered the fourth quarter with a lead of 14–7. Florida's defense was able to shut out Oklahoma's offense in two of the three quarters played up to that point.

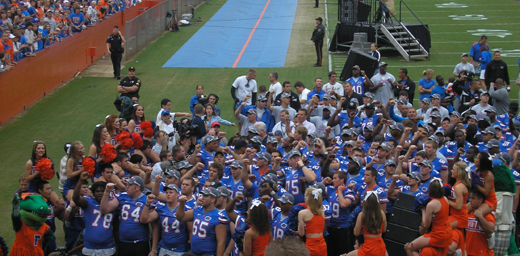
The Gators singing "The Orange and Blue" at the end of a post-championship celebration on Florida Field, January 11, 2009

The Sooners received the ball to open the fourth quarter after forcing a punt by Florida at the end of the third quarter. Oklahoma was able to put together another quick scoring drive. This one took only 2:36 off the clock and 8 plays to go 77 yards down the field. The Sooners tied the game at 14–14 after a Sam Bradford pass to Jermaine Gresham, who lost his shoe after catching the ball on the play. With 12:13 left in the game and the score tied at 14–14, the Gators' first play of their next possession was a hand-off to Percy Harvin who ran the ball 52 yards before being pushed out of bounds. Although the Gators were able to get into the red zone—the Oklahoma 10 yard line—they were unable to score a TD and settled for a field goal, putting the Gators back in the lead. The Sooners started their drive after the kickoff at the Oklahoma 35-yard line with 10:45 remaining. On the fourth play of the drive from midfield, Sam Bradford threw a deep pass intended for teammate Juaquin Iglesias, but just as Iglesias got his hands on the ball, Ahmad Black pulled it away for the interception. This was Black's seventh interception of the season; tying him for first in the NCAA with most interceptions. At this point, both starting quarterbacks had thrown for two interceptions each. The Gators capitalized off the turnover and formed a drive taking nearly 7 minutes off the game clock. On a 2nd and Goal at the Oklahoma 4 yard line, Tim Tebow threw for his second TD pass of the game—this time on a jump pass to junior WR David Nelson. This extended the Gators' lead to 10 and brought the score to 24–14. Oklahoma tried to respond on their following drive, but when faced with a 4th and 4, Joe Haden broke up a pass that would have been for a first down. After the turnover on downs, the Gators ran out the clock, thus winning the BCS Championship.

The Gators ended the game with 480 yards of offense to Oklahoma's 363. Percy Harvin led the Gators on the ground with 122 rushing yards followed by Tim Tebow with 109. The Gators used seven wide receivers to complete 18 passes for a total of 231 yards. Florida defensive lineman Carlos Dunlap was named defensive player of the game and Florida quarterback Tim Tebow was named offensive player of the game. This was the Gators' third national championship in school history and their second in the last three seasons. Bob Stoops and the Sooners extended their BCS bowl losing streak to five games and have lost two national championships at Dolphin Stadium after winning his only championship in the same stadium in 2001. Urban Meyer's BCS bowl record extended to 3–0 with the first won as head coach of the Utah Utes. He has a bowl game record at Florida of 3–1 with his only bowl loss coming in the previous season. During the championship celebration three days after the game, quarterback Tim Tebow announced he would return to the University of Florida for his senior season. This game was also determined by FOX to be their most watched BCS bowl game since televising BCS games in January 2007. It was viewed by 26.8 million viewers, and at least 50 million viewers tuned in at some point of the game.

==== BCS National Championship Stats ====
Leading passers

- FLA – Tim Tebow – 18/30, 231 yards, 2 TD, 2 INT
- OKLA – Sam Bradford – 26/41, 256 yards, 2 TD, 2 INT

Leading rushers

- FLA – Percy Harvin – 9 rushes, 122 yards, 1 TD
- OKLA – Chris Brown – 22 rushes, 110 yards

Leading receivers

- FLA – Aaron Hernandez – 5 receptions, 57 yards
- OKLA – Jermaine Gresham – 8 receptions, 62 yards, 2 TD

=== Awards and honors ===
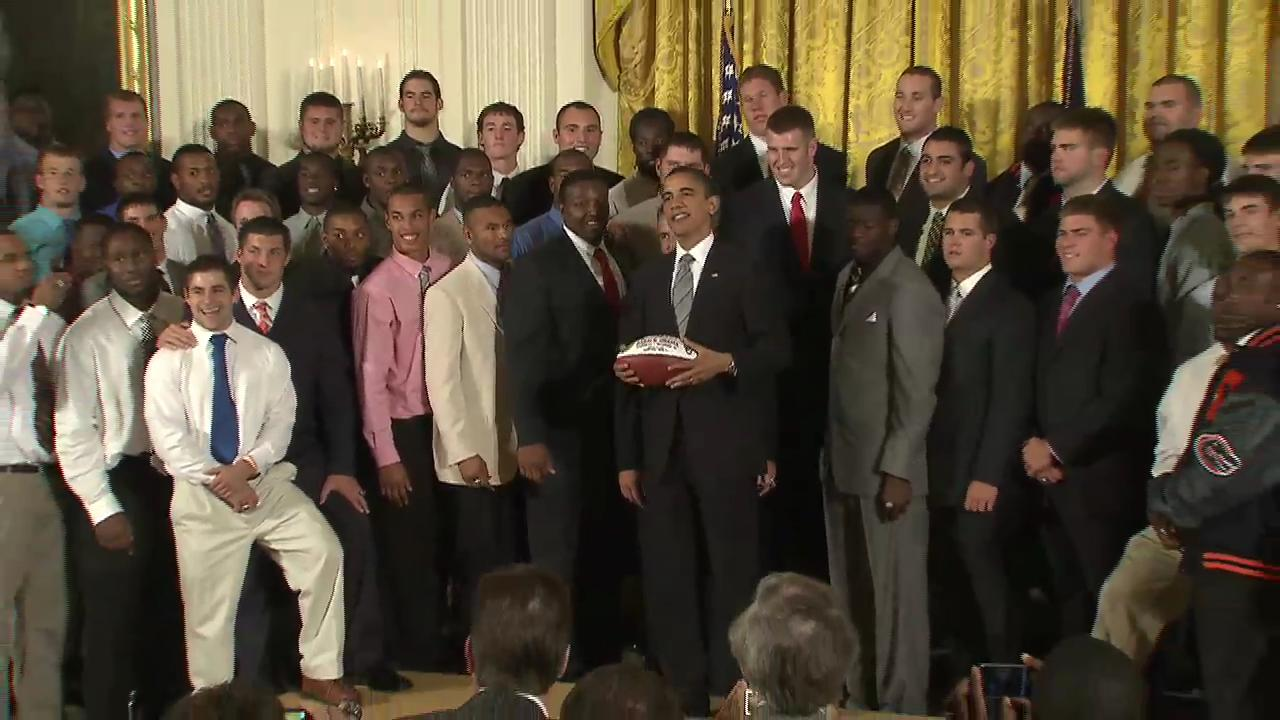
The Florida Gators meet with President Barack Obama in April 2009 after winning the national championship.

==== Associated Press All-SEC ====
All-SEC First Team
- Tim Tebow, QB
- Percy Harvin, (all purpose)
- Brandon Spikes, ILB
- Phil Trautwein, OT

All-SEC Second Team
- Percy Harvin, WR
- Jermaine Cunningham, DE
- Carlos Dunlap, DE
- Joe Haden, CB

SEC Offensive Player of the Year
- Tim Tebow, QB

==== Coaches All-SEC ====
All-SEC First Team
- Tim Tebow, QB
- Percy Harvin, WR
- Brandon Spikes, LB
- Phil Trautwein, OT
- Brandon James, RS

All-SEC Second Team
- Ahmad Black, SS
- Joe Haden, CB
- Mike Pouncey, G
- Chas Henry, P

Freshman All-SEC Team
- Jeffery Demps, RB
- Chris Rainey, RB
- Janoris Jenkins, CB
- Will Hill, FS

=== Individual awards and accomplishments ===
Maxwell Award
- Tim Tebow, QB

Manning Award
- Tim Tebow, QB

Walter Camp All-American Second Team
- Percy Harvin, WR

Wuerffel Trophy
- Tim Tebow, QB

AP All-American First Team
- Brandon Spikes, LB

Heisman Memorial Trophy Award Finalist
- Tim Tebow, QB

Walter Camp All-American First Team
- Brandon Spikes, LB

== Scores by quarter ==
	1	2	3	4	Total
Opponents	20	38	64	59	181
Gators	167	161	139	144	611

== Personnel ==
=== Depth chart ===
(revised 11–22–08)

Defense

FS
Major Wright
Justin Williams

WLB	Middle LB	SLB
⋅	Brandon Spikes	⋅
Brandon Hicks	Ryan Stamper	⋅

SS
Ahmad Black
Will Hill

CB
Joe Haden
Markihe Anderson

DE	DT	DT	DE
Jermaine Cunningham	Terron Sanders	Lawrence Marsh	Carlos Dunlap
Duke Lemmens	Matt Patchan	Troy Epps	Justin Trattou

CB
Janoris Jenkins
Wondy Pierre-Louis

Offense

WR
Riley Cooper
Deonte Thompson

WR
Percy Harvin
David Nelson

LT	LG	C	RG	RT
Phil Trautwein	Carl Johnson	Maurkice Pouncey	Mike Pouncey	Jason Watkins
James Wilson	Jim Tartt	Corey Hobbs	Maurice Hurt	Marcus Gilbert

TE
Aaron Hernandez
Tate Casey

WR
Louis Murphy
Carl Moore

QB
Tim Tebow
John Brantley

Key reserves
QB Cam Newton
RB Emmanuel Moody
RB Kestahn Moore
LS Butch Rowley

RB
Jeff Demps
Chris Rainey

Special teams
PK Jonathan Phillips
PK Caleb Sturgis
P Chas Henry
P Bobby Kane
KR Brandon James / Kestahn Moore
PR Brandon James
LS James Smith

=== Roster ===
2008 Florida Gators roster
Quarterbacks: 12 John Brantley – (redshirt) Freshman; 13 Cam Newton – Sophomore; 14 Andrew Blaylock – (redshirt) Sophomore; 15 Tim Tebow – Junior; 38 Zack O'Quinn – Freshman; Running backs: 3 Chris Rainey – (redshirt) Freshman; 21 Emmanuel Moody – (redshirt) Sophomore; 20 Christopher Scott – (redshirt) Junior; 27 Mon Williams – (redshirt) Sophomore; 33 Kestahn Moore – Senior; 44 Ean McQuay – (redshirt) Freshman; Athlete: 2 Jeff Demps – Freshman; 25 Brandon James – Junior; Fullbacks: 42 Steven Wilks – (redshirt) Freshman; 45 T. J. Pridemore – Freshman; 49 Rick Burgess – Junior; Wide receivers: 1 Percy Harvin – Junior; 3 Brandon Frazier – (redshirt) Sophomore; 6 Deonte Thompson – (redshirt) Freshman; 9 Louis Murphy – Senior; 11 Riley Cooper – Junior; 16 Carl Moore – Junior; 18 T.J. Lawrence – Freshman; 82 Omarius Hines – Freshman; 83 David Nelson – (redshirt) Junior; 85 Frankie Hammond Jr. – Freshman; 88 Paul Wilson – (redshirt) Freshman; Tight ends: 7 Cornelius Ingram – (redshirt) Senior; 81 Aaron Hernandez – Sophomore; 82 Christopher Coleman – (redshirt) Sophomore; 84 Tate Casey – (redshirt) Senior	Offensive line: 50 Sam Robey – Freshman; 55 Mike Pouncey – Sophomore; 56 Maurkice Pouncey – Sophomore; 57 Carl Johnson – (redshirt) Sophomore; 60 William Steinmann – Freshman; 61 Gary Beemer – (redshirt) Sophomore; 63 Jim Tartt – (redshirt) Senior; 64 Kyle Newell – Senior; 65 Brad Hiers – Senior; 66 James Wilson – (redshirt) Freshman; 67 Jess Williams – Freshman; 68 Jim Barrie – (redshirt) Sophomore; 72 Shawn Schmieder – (redshirt) Freshman; 72 Bryan Jones – Freshman; 74 Maurice Hurt – (redshirt) Sophomore; 75 Phil Trautwein – (redshirt) Senior; 76 Marcus Gilbert – (redshirt) Sophomore; 77 Jason Watkins – (redshirt) Senior; 78 David Young – Freshman; 79 Corey Hobbs – (redshirt) Sophomore; Defensive line: 6 Jaye Howard – (redshirt) Freshman; 8 Carlos Dunlap – Sophomore; 44 Duke Lemmens – Sophomore; 47 Brandon Antwine – (redshirt) Sophomore; 49 Jermaine Cunningham – Junior; 58 Jamael Autry – (redshirt) Sophomore; 59 John Fairbanks – (redshirt) Sophomore; 62 Lamar Abel – (redshirt) Freshman; 70 Ronnie Wilson – (redshirt) Junior; 71 Matt Patchan – Freshman; 90 Lawrence Marsh – (redshirt) Sophomore; 91 Earl Okine – Freshman; 92 Terron Sanders – (redshirt) Sophomore; 93 Javier Estopinan – (redshirt) Senior; 94 Justin Trattou – Sophomore; 95 Torrey Davis – Sophomore; 96 William Green – Freshman; 97 John Brown – (redshirt) Freshman; 98 Troy Epps – Junior; 99 Omar Hunter – Freshman	Linebackers: 16 A. J. Jones – (redshirt) Sophomore; 26 Lorenzo Edwards – Sophomore; 30 John Jones – Sophomore; 32 Dustin Doe – Junior; 34 Lerentee McCray – Freshman; 40 Brandon Hicks – Sophomore; 41 Ryan Stamper – (redshirt) Junior; 46 Michael Ross – Freshman; 50 Chris Pintado – (redshirt) Sophomore; 51 Brandon Spikes – Junior; 53 Jamaal Deveaux – Senior; 54 Roderick Blackett – (redshirt) Junior; 54 Brandon Beal – Freshman; Defensive backs: 4 Levi Leigh – Senior; 5 Joe Haden – Sophomore; 23 Corey Henderson – (redshirt) Freshman; 27 Adrian Bushell – Freshman; 33 Scott Peek – Freshman; 34 Reginald Hopkins – (redshirt) Freshman; 39 Joey Sorrentino – (redshirt) Junior; 42 Miguel Carodine – (redshirt) Sophomore; 45 Kyle Pratt – Senior; 48 Marquis Hannah – (redshirt) Freshman; 85 Andrew Fritze – (redshirt) Junior; Cornerbacks: 4 Wondy Pierre-Louis – Junior; 14 Markihe Anderson – Junior; 23 Jacques Rickerson – (redshirt) Sophomore; 28 Jeremy Brown – Freshman; 29 Rashad Dunbar – (redshirt) Freshman; 29 Janoris Jenkins – Freshman; 36 Moses Jenkins – Sophomore; 37 Vincent Brown – (redshirt) Freshman	Safeties: 7 Justin Williams – (redshirt) Sophomore; 10 Will Hill – Freshman; 17 Curtis Carr – Senior; 20 Dorian Munroe – (redshirt) Junior; 21 Major Wright – Sophomore; 22 Cade Holliday – (redshirt) Junior; 24 John Curtis – (redshirt) Senior; 31 Bryan Thomas – (redshirt) Sophomore; 35 Cody Worton – (redshirt) Sophomore; 35 Ahmad Black – Sophomore; Punters: 17 Chas Henry – Freshman; 42 David Lerner – Freshman; 92 Bobby Kane – Sophomore; Kickers: 19 Caleb Sturgis – Freshman; 47 Greg Taussig – Senior; 38 Jonathan Phillips – Senior; Long snappers: 37 Butch Rowley – (redshirt) Senior; 43 James Smith – (redshirt) Senior; 58 Mike Williamson – (redshirt) Junior

=== Coaching staff ===
2008 Florida Gators coaching staff
- Urban Meyer – Head coach – 3 years at UF
- Steve Addazio – Assistant head coach, offense/offensive line – 3 years
- Vance Bedford – Cornerbacks – 0 years
- Kenny Carter – Running backs – 0 years
- Billy Gonzales – Recruiting coordinator/wide receivers – 3 years
- Chuck Heater – Assistant defensive coordinator/safeties – 3 years
- John Hevesy – Tight ends/assistant offensive line – 3 years
- Dan McCarney – Assistant head coach, defense/defensive line – 0 years
- Dan Mullen – Offensive coordinator/quarterbacks – 3 years
- Charlie Strong – Defensive coordinator, associate head coach/linebackers – 8 years

2008 University of Florida Football Roster and Coaches https://web.archive.org/web/20090705062526/http://gatorzone.com/football/bios.php

== Team statistics ==
	UF	OPP
Scoring	611	181
Points per game	43.6	12.9
First downs	306	234
Rushing	154	97
Passing	129	116
Penalty	23	21
Total offense	6231	3994
Avg per play	7.1	4.5
Avg per game	445.1	285.3
Fumbles-lost	19–8	16–9
Penalties-yards	102–839	87–702
Avg per game	59.9	50.1

	UF	OPP
Punts-yards	45-1952	73-2873
Avg per punt	43.4	39.4
Time of possession/game	30:06	29:54
3rd down conversions	83/161	63/192
4th down conversions	11/16	8/24
Touchdowns scored	82	21
Field goals-attempts	12–13	12–17
PAT-attempts	81–82	17–20
Attendance	633807	299220
Games/avg per game	7/90544	4/74805
Neutral site games	3/79670	

== Player statistics ==
=== Offense ===
==== Rushing ====
Name	#	GP	Att	Gain	Loss	Net	Avg	TD	Long	Avg/G
Tebow, T.	15	14	176	792	119	673	3.8	12	26	48.1
Harvin, P.	1	12	70	668	8	660	9.4	10	80	55.0
Rainey, C.	3	14	84	673	21	652	7.8	4	75	46.6
Demps, J.	2	14	78	621	16	605	7.8	7	62	43.2
Moody, E.	21	10	58	424	7	417	7.2	1	40	41.7
Moore, K.	33	14	29	147	5	142	4.9	4	22	10.1
James, B.	25	14	14	65	6	59	4.2	2	13	4.2
Henry, C.	17	14	1	17	0	17	17.0	0	17	1.2
Brown, V.	37	3	6	11	0	11	1.8	0	5	3.7
Newton, C.	13	1	5	15	5	10	2.0	1	12	10.0
Brantley, J.	12	9	9	26	18	8	0.9	0	9	0.9
Murphy, L.	9	14	2	7	0	7	3.5	0	4	0.5
Williams, M.	27	1	1	2	0	2	2.0	0	2	2.0
Estopinan, J.	93	14	1	1	0	1	1.0	1	1	0.1
Team total		14	545	3469	233	3236	5.9	42	80	231.1

==== Passing ====
Name	#	GP	Effic	Cmp-Atm-Int	Pct	Yds	TD	Lng	Avg/G
Tebow, T.	15	14	172.37	192–298–4	64.4	2746	30	70	196.1
Brantley, J.	12	9	163.00	18–28–1	64.3	235	3	38	26.1
Newton, C.	13	1	108.80	1–2–0	50.0	14	0	14	14.0
Murphy, L.	9	14	0.00	0–1–0	0.0	0	0	0	0.0
Team total		14	170.66	211–329–5	64.1	2995	33	70	213.9

==== Receiving ====
Name	#	GP	No.	Yds	Avg	TD	Long	Avg/G
Harvin, P.	1	12	40	644	16.1	7	70	53.7
Murphy, L.	9	14	38	655	17.2	7	48	46.8
Hernandez, A.	81	13	34	381	11.2	5	38	29.3
Thompson, D.	6	14	18	269	14.9	3	46	19.2
Cooper, R.	11	14	18	261	14.5	3	51	18.6
Demps, J.	2	14	15	141	9.4	1	61	10.1
Moore, C.	16	13	14	184	13.1	1	28	14.2
Nelson, D.	83	13	12	228	19.0	5	41	17.5
James, B.	25	14	11	95	8.6	1	22	6.8
Casey, T.	84	14	4	64	16.0	0	34	4.6
Moore, December .	33	14	4	36	9.0	0	14	2.6
Rainey, C.	3	14	3	37	12.3	0	16	2.6
Total		14	211	2995	14.2	33	70	213.9

=== Defense ===
Name	#	GP	Tackles				Sacks	Pass defense				Fumbles		Misc.	
Name	#	GP	Solo	Ast	Total	TFL-Yds	No-Yds	BrUp	QBH	Int.-Yds	TD	Rcv-Yds	FF	Blkd Kick	Saf
Spikes, B.	51	13	52	41	93	8.0–29	2.0–13	2	4	4–93	2				
Haden, J.	5	14	61	26	87	0.5–5	0.5–5	12		3–136		1–0	1	1	
Wright, M.	21	14	36	30	66			6		4–35	1				
Black, A.	35	14	27	32	59	0.5–1		5	1	7–191	2			1	
Cunningham, J.	49	14	23	29	52	10.0–54	6.0–44	4	4				3		
Hill, W.	10	13	29	19	48	1.5–3		1	1	2–53					
Stamper, R.	41	12	20	25	45	3.0–11	1.0–6					2–0			
Dunlap, C.	8	14	21	18	39	13.5–75	9.5–65	1	7			1–0	1	3	
Jenkins, Ja.	29	14	27	12	39	1.0–12	1.0–12	11		3–19			1		
Jones, A.	16	12	14	21	35	2.5–13		3	1			1–0	1		
Hicks, B.	40	14	19	15	34	2.5–22	2.0–21	4							
Doe, D.	32	12	16	14	30	2.5–4	0.5–2	2	1	1–0					
Marsh, L.	90	14	14	14	28	5.5–16	3.0–11		1						
Edwards, L.	26	13	18	9	27										
Trattou, J.	94	14	17	10	27	4.0–13	1.5–9	1	1						
Sanders, T.	92	14	8	13	21	4.0–10						1–20			
Anderson, M.	14	14	15	6	21	1.0–2		3							
Pierre-Louis, W.	4	14	12	7	19			2		1–0					
Jones, J.	30	11	13	5	18			1							
Williams, Ju.	7	14	11	5	16			1							
Jenkins, M.	36	13	11	1	12										
Rickerson, J.	23	8	7	3	10					1–0					
Howard, J.	6	9	6	2	8	2.5–7	1.5–6					1–0			
Davis, T.	95	8	6	1	7	2.0–5			1						
Lemmens, D.	44	10	4	3	7	3.0–6	2.0–5	1					1		
Patchan, M.	71	11	2	5	7	1.5–5	1.5–5	1							
Green, W.	96	13	4	3	7	2.0–5	1.0–3		1					1	
Holliday, C.	22	14	3	3	6										
McCray, L.	34	8	5		5										
Smith, J.	43	14	1	3	4							1–4			
Demps, J.	2	14	1	3	4									2	
James, B.	25	14	4		4							1–0			
Tebow, T.	15	14	3		3										
Antwine, B.	47	7	1	2	3										
Thompson, D.	6	14	1	1	2										
Thomas, B.	31	7		2	2										
Moore, K.	33	14	2		2										
Leigh, L.	86	8	1	1	2										
Sturgis, C.	19	14	1	1	2										
Epps, T.	98	5	1	1	2										
Worton, C.	46	2	1		1										
Watkins, J.	77	14	1		1										
Robey, S.	50	1		1	1										
Blackett, R.	54	13	1		1										
Pouncey, Ma.	56	14		1	1										
Phillips, J.	38	14	1		1										
Team	TM	9	1		1	1.0–10	1.0–10							1	1
Total		14	522	388	910	72–308	34–217	59	23	26–527	5	9–24	8	9	1

=== Special teams ===
==== Kicking ====
Name	#	Punting								Kicking						
Name	#	No.	Yds	Avg	Long	TB	FC	I20	Blkd	No.	Yds	Avg	TB	OB	FG	XP
Henry, C.	17	44	1908	43.4	67	8	10	21	0							
Kane, B.	92	1	44	44.0	44	0	0	1	0							
Phillips, J.	38									13	685	52.7	0	2	12–13	78–79
Sturgis, C.	19									90	5733	63.7	12	8		2–2
Tassig, G.	47									6	347	57.8	0	0		1–1
Total		45	1952	43.4	67	8	10	22	0	109	6765	62.1	12	10	12–13	81–82

==== Returns ====
Name	#	Punt returns					Kick returns				
Name	#	No.	Yds	Avg	TD	Long	No.	Yds	Avg	TD	Long
James, B.	25	37	510	13.8	2	78	32	738	23.1	0	52
Demps, J.	2	2	37	18.5	0	0	1	39	39.0	0	39
Green, W.	96	1	23	23.0	0	0					
Nelson, D.	83	1	5	5.0	0	5					
Dunlap, C.	8	1	12	12.0	0	0					
Williams, Ju.	7	0	5	0.0	0	5					
Estopinan, J.	93						2	14	7.0	0	8
Rainey, C.	3						1	6	6.0	0	6
Fritze, A.	85						1	14	14.0	0	14
Casey, T.	84						1	4	4.0	0	4
Total		42	592	14.1	2	78	38	815	21.4	0	52

Statistics as of Jan 9, 2009 https://web.archive.org/web/20081203025300/http://gatorzone.com/football/stats/team.pdf%3C

== Players drafted into the NFL ==
Round	Pick	Player	Position	NFL club
1	22	Percy Harvin	WR	Minnesota Vikings
4	124	Louis Murphy	WR	Oakland Raiders
