= Torrey Davis =

American gridiron football player (born 1988)

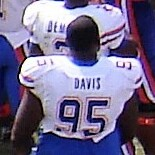
- Davis with the Florida Gators in 2008

No. 94, 98
- Position: Defensive tackle

Personal information
- Born: September 24, 1988 (age 38); Seffner, Florida, U.S.
- Listed height: 6 ft 3 in (1.91 m)
- Listed weight: 300 lb (136 kg)

Career information
- High school: Seffner (FL) Armwood
- College: Florida; Jacksonville State
- NFL draft: 2010: undrafted

Career history
- Tampa Bay Buccaneers (2010)*; Spokane Shock (2010); Kansas City Command (2010); Calgary Stampeders (2011–2012); Hamilton Tiger-Cats (2012–2014); Edmonton Eskimos (2015); Tampa Bay Storm (2016–2017)
- * Offseason or practice squad member only

Awards and highlights
- BCS National Champion (2009)

Career CFL statistics
- Games played: 36
- Games started: 13
- Total tackles: 78
- Sacks: 3
- Stats at CFL.ca (archive)

Torrey Davis (born September 24, 1988) is an American former football defensive tackle. He played for the Calgary Stampeders, Hamilton Tiger-Cats and Edmonton Eskimos of the Canadian Football League (CFL). He played college football of the Florida Gators football team for the University of Florida and the Jacksonville State Gamecocks football team of the Jacksonville State University.

A former five-star recruit out of Armwood High School, Davis played two seasons for the Gators, including the 2008 championship season. He made two goal-line tackles in the national championship game against Oklahoma. However, he also had off-the-field trouble, as he was cited for underage drinking in January 2008, and for driving with a suspended license in July 2008. In March 2009, he decided to leave the Florida Gators, and was soon later arrested for violation of probation. He transferred to Jacksonville State, where he played one season before leaving for the NFL.

Davis went undrafted in the 2010 NFL draft, but was later signed on the Tampa Bay Buccaneers off-season squad. He did not make the season roster, and eventually played with Spokane and Kansas City of the Arena Football League, before winding up in the CFL. On June 9, 2016, Davis was assigned to the Tampa Bay Storm. On June 15, 2016, Davis was placed on recallable reassignment. On July 18, 2016, Davis was placed on league suspension.
