= Dominic Douglas =

American football player (born 1986)

No. 58
- Position: Linebacker

Personal information
- Born: November 24, 1986 (age 39); Clinton, Mississippi, U.S.
- Listed height: 6 ft 1 in (1.85 m)
- Listed weight: 229 lb (104 kg)

Career information
- College: Mississippi State
- NFL draft: 2009: undrafted

Career history
- St. Louis Rams (2009); Denver Broncos (2010)*
- * Offseason or practice squad member only

Awards and highlights
- Second-team All-SEC (2008)
- Stats at Pro Football Reference

Dominic Douglas (born November 24, 1986) is an American former professional football player who was a linebacker in the National Football League (NFL). He played college football for the Mississippi State Bulldogs and was signed by the St. Louis Rams as an undrafted free agent in 2009.

He also played for the Denver Broncos.

== Early life ==
He was named Second-team, All-Metro Jackson by the Jackson Clarion-Ledger following his senior season at Clinton (Miss.) High School.

== College years ==
He transferred to Mississippi State University in 2007 from Hinds Community College in Raymond, Miss. He played in all 25 games at MSU, starting 23 times and making 194 total tackles, including 13.5 for loss, one of which was a quarterback sack. He also tallied one interception, two passes defensed and a forced fumble. He led the team and the Southeastern Conference his senior season with 116 total tackles and was one of only three players in the SEC with at least 100 tackles. He registered double-digit tackles five times during senior campaign

He played in all 13 games in 2007, starting in 11 and finished second on the team with 78 tackles, including eight for loss, one of which was a sack. He led Mississippi Association of Community and Junior Colleges in solo tackles during his sophomore campaign at Hinds.

== Professional career ==
Douglas was signed by the St. Louis Rams as an undrafted free agent on April 30, 2009. He played in four games for the team in 2009. He was released by the Rams on August 24, 2010. He was then signed by the Denver Broncos on December 22, 2010. On July 31, 2011, he was waived by Denver.
