= 2008 SEC Championship Game =

- Conference Championship
- 2008 SEC Championship logo
Alabama Crimson Tide	Florida Gators
(12–0)	(11–1)
20	31
Head coach: Nick Saban	Head coach: Urban Meyer
AP / Coaches / BCS; 1 / 1 / 1	AP / Coaches / BCS; 2 / 4 / 4
	1	2	3	4	Total
Alabama	10	0	10	0	20
Florida	7	10	0	14	31
- Date: December 6, 2008
- Season: 2008
- Stadium: Georgia Dome
- Location: Atlanta, Georgia
- MVP: QB Tim Tebow, Florida
- Favorite: Florida by 10
- National anthem: Million Dollar Band; The Pride of the Sunshine
- Referee: Tom Ritter
- Halftime show: Million Dollar Band; The Pride of the Sunshine
- Attendance: 75,892

United States TV coverage
- Network: CBS
- Announcers: Verne Lundquist (play-by-play); Gary Danielson (color); Tracy Wolfson (sideline)
- Nielsen ratings: 10.4

2008 Southeastern Conference football standings
	Conf.			Overall
Team	W		L	W		L
Eastern Division
No. 1 Florida x$#	7	–	1	13	–	1
No. 13 Georgia	6	–	2	10	–	3
Vanderbilt	4	–	4	7	–	6
South Carolina	4	–	4	7	–	6
Tennessee	3	–	5	5	–	7
Kentucky	2	–	6	7	–	6
Western Division
No. 6 Alabama x%	8	–	0	12	–	2
No. 14 Ole Miss	5	–	3	9	–	4
LSU	3	–	5	8	–	5
Arkansas	2	–	6	5	–	7
Auburn	2	–	6	5	–	7
Mississippi State	2	–	6	4	–	8
Championship: Florida 31, Alabama 20
# – BCS National Champion; $ – BCS representative as conference champion; % – BCS at-large representative; x – Division champion/co-champions; Rankings from AP Poll

The 2008 Dr Pepper SEC Championship Game was played December 6, 2008, in the Georgia Dome in Atlanta to determine the 2008 football champion of the Southeastern Conference (SEC). The game featured the Florida Gators and the Alabama Crimson Tide. The Gators were classified as the home team. Before this game was played, the designated "home team", chosen on an alternating basis, was 10–6 (11–6 after Florida's win in this game) in SEC Championship Games. The SEC East is 10–6 in SEC Championship games (11–6 after Florida's win), with the Florida Gators accounting for six of the 10 victories. (seven after this game) Before this game, Alabama had represented the SEC West five times in the conference championship game with a 2–3 record.

The game was televised by CBS Sports and kicked off at 4:00 pm EST.

== Selection process ==
The SEC Championship Game matches up the winner of the Eastern and Western divisions of the Southeastern Conference. The game was first played in 1992, when the conference expanded from 10 to 12 teams with the addition of Arkansas and South Carolina. The SEC was the first conference in college football to have a conference championship game. Seven other conferences currently have conference championship games (ACC, BIG 10, BIG 12, CUSA, MAC, MWC & Pac-12).

== Regular season ==
Alabama entered Nick Saban's second year as head coach with an AP preseason ranking of 24. After finishing the 2007 season 7–6, including a win in the Independence Bowl, the Crimson Tide brought in one of the nation's top recruiting classes and was expected to improve in 2008. The team started off strong in the Chick-fil-A College Kickoff with a convincing 34–10 win over #9 Clemson. Four weeks later they shocked the nation by defeating #3 Georgia 41–30 in Athens after building a 31–0 halftime lead. The rest of the season included a 27–21 overtime victory over #16 LSU in Nick Saban's first game in Baton Rouge against his old team, as well as a 36–0 shutout of Auburn to end Alabama's 6-game losing streak to their in-state rival. The Crimson Tide finished the regular season with a 12–0 record and a #1 ranking in the BCS, AP, and Coaches' Polls.

Only two years removed from a national championship, Florida entered the season with high hopes and an AP preseason ranking of 5. The Gators went 9–4 in 2007, and they had many key players returning, including Heisman Trophy winner Tim Tebow. After a 3–0 start, the team suffered a devastating home loss to Ole Miss. However, this loss was later seen as a turning point for Florida. In their last 8 games, the Gators scored no less than 38 points and had an average margin of victory of 39.6. Key victories included #4 LSU (51–21), #6 Georgia (49–10), #25 South Carolina (56–6), and #20 Florida State (45–15). Florida finished the regular season with an 11–1 record and a #2 ranking in the AP Poll.

== Game hype and difference in style ==
After the match-up between Alabama and Florida was set November 8, when Alabama defeated LSU and Florida defeated Vanderbilt, the game began to receive a great deal of attention in sports media. Many college football analysts called the game a "play-in game" for the BCS National Championship, easily making it one of the most anticipated games of the year.

Analyst cited the differences in the teams' styles as a major point of interest. Florida's style of football came directly from Urban Meyer's offensive-minded philosophy of a fast-paced offense and defense, generally using smaller, quicker players. They run a form of the spread offense, using speed to spread the field, which results in quick drives and higher scoring games. The Gators use a basic 4-3 defense and again use speedy players to try to gain an advantage on their opponent.

Alabama on the other hand ran an almost complete opposite style of football, led by Nick Saban's defensive-minded philosophy of physical domination on both sides of the ball, generally using bigger, more physical players. The Tide ran a smashmouth offensive scheme utilizing a physical offensive line and power running backs to control the line of scrimmage, which results in slower drives, an advantage in time of possession and lower scoring games. On defense, the team operated out of a base 3-4 defense, utilizing quick and physical linebackers to allow more flexibility in stopping multiple offensive formations and schemes.

== Game summary ==
After a forcing Alabama to a three-and-out on their opening drive Florida struck first moving 59 yards while never facing a third-down to take a 7–0 lead on a 3-yard touchdown pass from Tim Tebow to Carl Moore. Alabama responded with a touchdown "drive" of their own. On the first play, quarterback John Parker Wilson connecting on a 64-yard bomb to superstar freshman receiver Julio Jones. On the very next play Glenn Coffee burst through for an 18-yard touchdown run. After a Florida three-and-out Alabama took its first lead at 10–7 with a 30-yard field goal by Leigh Tiffin. After another Florida three-and-out Alabama drove to the Florida 32-yard line. The 49-yard field goal attempt was a fake and holder P. J. Fitzgerald could only gain a yard. Taking over at their own 31-yard line, Florida retaliated with a swift drive culminating in a 19-yard field goal by Jonathan Phillips to tie the game, 10–10. Following an Alabama three-and-out Florida retook the lead with a 57-yard drive that Tebow capped off with a 5-yard touchdown pass to David Nelson. Alabama was forced to punt on their next drive and Florida lead at halftime 17–10. Alabama's defense forced a three-and-out and then their offense used the "ground-and-pound" strategy to perfection running 15 plays, gaining 91 yards and taking 6:53 off the clock to tie the game at 17–17 with a 2-yard rushing touchdown by Mark Ingram II Florida seemed poised to take the lead on their drive, but after the drive stalled Phillips missed a 42-yard field goal. Alabama didn't waste their chance as a 27-yard Tiffin field goal gave them a 20–17 lead going into the fourth quarter. Then, Tebow took over. Florida took a page from the Alabama playbook, using a long drive, converting two third downs before Jeffery Demps ran in a touchdown from one yard out, retaking the lead 24–20. Return ace Javier Arenas returned the resulting kickoff 41 yards to the Alabama 41, but on 3rd-and-8 Jermaine Cunningham sacked Wilson for an 11-yard loss. The Gators put the game away on their next drive, storming 67 yards in just 8 plays with Tebow throwing a dart to Riley Cooper to increase the lead to 31–20 with just 2:50 remaining in the game. An interception by Joe Haden with 1:41 sealed the deal as Florida ran out the rest of the clock. Florida out gaining Alabama 358–323, converting 7 of their 13 third downs to Alabama's 5 of 12, and zero Florida turnovers were the most deciding factors. Despite going just 14–22 for the game, Tebow was 5–5 for 70 yards and 1 touchdown in the fourth quarter bringing his overall night to 14–22 for 218 yards 3 touchdowns and 0 interceptions. Tebow and Demps carried the Florida running game combining for 110 yards on 30 carries. Louis Murphy was the leading receiver for Florida with 86 yards on just 4 catches. Wilson struggled going just 12–25 for 187 yards 0 touchdowns and 1 interception, but Coffee continued his hot streak by rushing for 112 yards on 21 carries including an 18-yard touchdown run. Jones was spectacular with 124 yards on merely 5 catches.

== Scoring summary ==
Quarter	Time	Drive		Team	Scoring Information	Score	
Quarter	Time	Length	Time	Team	Scoring Information	Alabama	Florida
1	8:17	9 plays, 59 yards	4:28	Florida	Carl Moore 3–yard reception from Tim Tebow, Jonathan Phillips kick good	0	7
1	7:23	2 plays, 82 yards	0:54	Alabama	Glen Coffee 11–yard rush, Leigh Tiffin kick good	7	7
1	3:28	5 plays, 12 yards	2:15	Alabama	Leigh Tiffin 30–yard field goal	10	7
2	8:59	8 plays, 67 yards	3:51	Florida	Jonathan Phillips 19–yard field goal	10	10
2	2:59	9 plays, 57 yards	4:20	Florida	David Nelson 5–yard reception from Tim Tebow, Jonathan Phillips kick good	10	17
3	6:20	15 plays, 91 yards	6:53	Alabama	Mark Ingram II 2–yard rush, Leigh Tiffin kick good	17	17
3	0:08	10 plays, 65 yards	3:40	Alabama	Leigh Tiffin 27–yard field goal	20	17
4	9:21	11 plays, 62 yards	5:47	Florida	Jeff Demps 1–yard rush, Jonathan Phillips kick good	20	24
4	2:50	8 plays, 65 yards	4:37	Florida	Riley Cooper 5–yard reception from Tim Tebow, Jonathan Phillips kick good	20	31
Final Score						20	31
