= 2009 BCS National Championship Game =

College football bowl game

2009 FedEx BCS National Championship Game
- 11th BCS National Championship Game
Florida Gators	Oklahoma Sooners
(12–1)	(12–1)
SEC	Big 12
24	14
Head coach: Urban Meyer	Head coach: Bob Stoops
AP / Coaches / BCS; 1 / 2 / 2	AP / Coaches / BCS; 2 / 1 / 1
	1	2	3	4	Total
Florida	0	7	7	10	24
Oklahoma	0	7	0	7	14
- Date: January 8, 2009
- Season: 2008
- Stadium: Dolphin Stadium
- Location: Miami Gardens, Florida
- MVP: Offense: QB Tim Tebow (Florida); Defense: DE Carlos Dunlap (Florida)
- Favorite: Florida by 5½
- National anthem: Yolanda Adams
- Referee: Ron Cherry (ACC)
- Attendance: 78,468
- Payout: US$17,500,000 per team to each conference

United States TV coverage
- Network: Fox
- Announcers: Thom Brennaman, Charles Davis and Chris Myers
- Nielsen ratings: 15.8 (26.8 million viewers)

The 2009 BCS National Championship Game (branded as the 2009 FedEx BCS National Championship Game for sponsorship reasons) was an American football game played at Dolphin Stadium in Miami Gardens, Florida, on January 8, 2009. It was the national championship game for the 2008 NCAA Division I FBS football season, and featured the second-ranked Florida Gators against the top-ranked Oklahoma Sooners. The two participants were determined by the BCS Rankings to decide the BCS National Championship. Television coverage in the United States was provided by Fox, and radio coverage by ESPN Radio. The game was the last BCS Championship to air on Fox; starting with the 2010 game, ABC or ESPN televised the championship.

Tim Tebow's two touchdown passes and Percy Harvin's two-yard touchdown run led the Florida Gators to their second BCS National Championship in three seasons. The Gators defeated the Oklahoma Sooners, 24–14, in front of a Dolphin Stadium record crowd of 78,468.

== Road to the championship ==
=== University of Oklahoma ===
The Sooners, coached by Bob Stoops, lost one game during their regular season to Texas in the annual Red River Rivalry contest, 45–35 on October 11. During the regular season, quarterback Sam Bradford, winner of the 2008 Heisman Trophy, led the Sooners on offense to become the highest-scoring team in NCAA history (702 points) and the first team to score 60 or more points in five consecutive games. The game was Oklahoma's fourth BCS Championship appearance.

=== University of Florida ===
The 2008 Florida Gators football season was marked by a powerful combination of dynamic offense and relentless defense. Under head coach Urban Meyer, the team, led by Heisman Trophy-winning quarterback Tim Tebow, finished the regular season with a 12-1 record, showcasing a potent spread offense and a formidable defense that consistently stifled opponents. Key victories included a thrilling win against rival Georgia and a dominant performance in the SEC Championship game against Alabama.

== Scoring summary ==
=== Scoring ===
First quarter

- No scoring

Second quarter

- FLA — Louis Murphy 20-yard pass from Tim Tebow (Jonathan Phillips kick), 14:02 FLA 7 - OKLA 0 (12 plays, 86 yards in 1:20).
- OKLA — Jermaine Gresham 6-yard pass from Sam Bradford (Jimmy Stevens kick), 11:49 FLA 7 - OKLA 7 (6 plays, 65 yards in 2:13).

Third quarter

- FLA — Percy Harvin 2-yard rush (Jonathan Phillips kick), 4:21 FLA 14 - OKLA 7 (13 plays, 75 yds in 5:22).

Fourth quarter

- OKLA — Jermaine Gresham 11-yard pass from Bradford (Jimmy Stevens kick), 12:13 FLA 14 - OKLA 14 (8 plays, 77 yds in 2:36).
- FLA — Jonathan Phillips 27-yard field goal, 10:45 FLA 17 - OKLA 14 (6 plays, 68 yds in 1:28).
- FLA — David Nelson 4-yard pass from Tim Tebow (Jonathan Phillips kick), 3:07 FLA 24 - OKLA 14 (11 plays, 76 yds in 6:52).

=== Statistics ===
- Passing: Sam Bradford (#14, QB, OKLA) 256 yards
- Rushing: Percy Harvin (#1, WR, FLA) 121 yards
- Receiving: Jermaine Gresham (#18, TE, OKLA) 62 yards

Team:	Florida	Oklahoma
1st Downs	24	25
3rd down efficiency	12–17	6–13
4th down efficiency	0–0	0–2
Total yards	480	363
Passing	316	256
Comp-Att	18–30	26–41
Yards per pass	7.7	6.0
Rushing	249	107
Rushing attempts	44	29
Yards per rush	5.7	3.7
Penalties	8–81	4–31
Turnovers	2	2
Fumbles lost	0	0
Interceptions thrown	2	2
Possession	34:57	25:03

== Game notes ==
- This was the first meeting between these two teams.
- Both starting quarterbacks were Heisman Trophy recipients.
- Despite both teams having potent offenses (the Gators had averaged over 45 points per game, while the Sooners averaged 54 points per game), neither team scored in the first quarter.
- Quarterbacks Tim Tebow and Sam Bradford combined for four interceptions despite throwing for just eight combined over the course of the regular season.
- The Gators thwarted two Sooners possessions that were inside the five-yard line: a stop on fourth and goal on the one-yard line in the second quarter, and an interception of Bradford's pass at Florida's three-yard line with 6 seconds to play in the first half.
- Despite coming off an ankle injury and declaring himself at "90%", Percy Harvin had nine carries for 122 yards and a touchdown and five receptions for 49 yards. The injury was reported as a high ankle sprain, but Harvin later stated that it was in fact a hairline fracture.
- Jimmy Stevens' 49-yard field goal attempt for the Sooners was blocked in the third quarter.
- Florida was ranked #1 and Oklahoma was ranked #5 in the final AP Top 25 and USA Today Coaches Poll, released after the game.

== See also ==
- 2008–09 NCAA football bowl games
