= 2007 LSU Tigers football team =

American college football season

2007 LSU Tigers football

Consensus national champion SEC champion SEC Western Division champion

SEC Championship Game, W 21–14 vs. Tennessee

BCS National Championship Game, W 38–24 vs. Ohio State
- Conference: Southeastern Conference
- Western Division

Ranking
- Coaches: No. 1
- AP: No. 1
- Record: 12–2 (6–2 SEC)
- Head coach: Les Miles (3rd season)
- Offensive coordinator: Gary Crowton (1st season)
- Offensive scheme: Pro-style
- Defensive coordinator: Bo Pelini (3rd season)
- Base defense: 4–3
- Home stadium: Tiger Stadium

2007 Southeastern Conference football standings
	Conf.			Overall
Team	W		L	W		L
Eastern Division
No. 12 Tennessee xy	6	–	2	10	–	4
No. 2 Georgia x%	6	–	2	11	–	2
No. 13 Florida	5	–	3	9	–	4
South Carolina	3	–	5	6	–	6
Kentucky	3	–	5	8	–	5
Vanderbilt	2	–	6	5	–	7
Western Division
No. 1 LSU x$#	6	–	2	12	–	2
No. 15 Auburn	5	–	3	9	–	4
Arkansas	4	–	4	8	–	5
Mississippi State	4	–	4	8	–	5
Alabama	4	–	4	7	–	6
Ole Miss	0	–	8	3	–	9
Championship: LSU 21, Tennessee 14
# – BCS National Champion; $ – BCS representative as conference champion; % – BCS at-large representative; x – Division champion/co-champions; y – Championship game participant; Alabama had 5 victories vacated by the NCAA in 2010. As such, the official record for Alabama is 2–6 (1–4).; Rankings from AP Poll

The 2007 LSU Tigers football team represented Louisiana State University during the 2007 NCAA Division I FBS football season. It won the Southeastern Conference (SEC) championship and the national championship–their third claimed national championship and fourth recognized by the NCAA and the college football community. It was the team’s second national championship in five years and first consensus national championship since 1958.

The team's head coach was Les Miles, who entered his third year at the helm. They were led on the field by senior quarterback Matt Flynn, running back Jacob Hester, and senior defensive tackle Glenn Dorsey, a two-time All-American and winner of multiple national trophies and awards. They played their home games at Tiger Stadium in Baton Rouge, Louisiana.

The team overcame two triple-overtime losses and four other close games to become the first two-loss national champion in the BCS/CFP era and the first two-loss national champion since the 1960 Minnesota Golden Gophers. On their way to the BCS national championship, the Tigers won their tenth SEC championship by defeating Tennessee in the SEC Championship Game.

The Tigers finished the season having earned the Southeastern Conference championship trophy, the Grantland Rice Award, the MacArthur Trophy, the Associated Press Trophy and the AFCA National Championship Trophy.

== Pre-season ==
LSU was ranked No. 2 in the preseason USA Today Coaches Poll and the preseason AP Poll.

In the pre-season, returning quarterback Matt Flynn was named one of the top-10 impact seniors for 2007. Senior tailback Alley Broussard left the team on July 24 to concentrate on academics. Broussard had started eight games, but was not expected to start in 2007.

=== Coaching changes ===
- Jimbo Fisher decided to leave LSU after seven years as the offensive coordinator to take the same position at FSU, where he was designated as the eventual successor to head coach Bobby Bowden. He was replaced by Gary Crowton who was the offensive coordinator for Oregon in 2005 & 2006.
- Todd Monken, who came to LSU with Les Miles in 2005, decided to leave after just two years as the passing game coordinator/wide receivers coach. It is rumored that Monken was unhappy that he was not chosen as the OC. He was replaced by D.J. McCarthy.
- Stacy Searels, the offensive line coach, was replaced by Greg Studrawa who had been the offensive coordinator at Bowling Green the previous four years. Searels left LSU to take the same position at Georgia.

=== 2007 recruiting class ===
LSU signed a total of 26 players for the 2007 recruiting class. The 2007 class was a solid recruiting class for Les Miles and the LSU Football program. The class was headlined by safety Chad Jones, wide receivers Demetrius Byrd and Terrance Tolliver, quarterback Jarrett Lee, and defensive tackle Joseph Barksdale. LSU did miss out on signing Joe McKnight, the top recruit out of Louisiana who decided to commit to USC instead. Overall, the 2007 LSU recruiting class was ranked No. 4 by rivals.com and No. 5 by scout.com.

College recruiting (2007)
Name	Hometown	School	Height	Weight	Commit date
Kentravis Aubrey; DE	Bastrop, Louisiana	Bastrop High School	6 ft 3 in (1.91 m)	285 lb (129 kg)	Mar 11, 2006
Kentravis Aubrey; DE	Recruit ratings: Scout: Rivals: (74)				
Joseph Barksdale; DT	Detroit	Cass Technical High School	6 ft 6 in (1.98 m)	323 lb (147 kg)	Jan 6, 2007
Joseph Barksdale; DT	Recruit ratings: Scout: Rivals: (79)				
DeAngelo Benton; WR	Bastrop, Louisiana	Bastrop High School	6 ft 3 in (1.91 m)	195 lb (88 kg)	May 25, 2006
DeAngelo Benton; WR	Recruit ratings: Scout: Rivals: (81)				
Will Blackwell; DT	West Monroe, Louisiana	West Monroe High School	6 ft 4 in (1.93 m)	296 lb (134 kg)	Jan 14, 2007
Will Blackwell; DT	Recruit ratings: Scout: Rivals: (79)				
Delvin Breaux; DB	New Orleans	McDonogh 35 Senior High School	6 ft 0 in (1.83 m)	175 lb (79 kg)	Jun 13, 2006
Delvin Breaux; DB	Recruit ratings: Scout: Rivals: (40)				
Ron Brooks; ATH	Irving, Texas	MacArthur High School	6 ft 0 in (1.83 m)	170 lb (77 kg)	Jan 11, 2007
Ron Brooks; ATH	Recruit ratings: Scout: Rivals: (79)				
Demetrius Byrd; WR	Poplarville, Mississippi	Pearl River Community College	6 ft 2 in (1.88 m)	195 lb (88 kg)	Jan 20, 2007
Demetrius Byrd; WR	Recruit ratings: Scout: Rivals: (N/A)				
Shomari Clemons; DB	West Monroe, Louisiana	West Monroe High School	6 ft 2 in (1.88 m)	229 lb (104 kg)	N/A
Shomari Clemons; DB	Recruit ratings: Scout: Rivals: (80)				
Jordon Corbin; TE	Lakeland, Florida	Lakeland Senior High School	6 ft 5 in (1.96 m)	235 lb (107 kg)	Jun 2, 2006
Jordon Corbin; TE	Recruit ratings: Scout: Rivals: (40)				
Sidell Corley; DE	Mobile, Alabama	McGill-Toolen High School	6 ft 4 in (1.93 m)	250 lb (110 kg)	Feb 4, 2007
Sidell Corley; DE	Recruit ratings: Scout: Rivals: (79)				
Andrew Crutchfield; K	Concord, North Carolina	Northwest Cabarrus High School	6 ft 0 in (1.83 m)	175 lb (79 kg)	Aug 3, 2006
Andrew Crutchfield; K	Recruit ratings: Scout: Rivals: (76)				
Josh Dworaczyk; OL	New Iberia, Louisiana	Catholic High School	6 ft 5 in (1.96 m)	263 lb (119 kg)	Aug 2, 2006
Josh Dworaczyk; OL	Recruit ratings: Scout: Rivals: (73)				
Stefoin Francois; DB	Reserve, Louisiana	East Saint John High School	6 ft 0 in (1.83 m)	188 lb (85 kg)	Feb 5, 2007
Stefoin Francois; DB	Recruit ratings: Scout: Rivals: (78)				
T-Bob Hebert; OL	Norcross, Georgia	Greater Atlanta Christian School	6 ft 3 in (1.91 m)	256 lb (116 kg)	Oct 26, 2006
T-Bob Hebert; OL	Recruit ratings: Scout: Rivals: (80)				
Josh Jasper; K	Memphis, Tennessee	Ridgeway High School	6 ft 0 in (1.83 m)	165 lb (75 kg)	Aug 31, 2006
Josh Jasper; K	Recruit ratings: Scout: Rivals: (78)				
Chad Jones; ATH	Baton Rouge, Louisiana	Southern Laboratory High School	6 ft 2 in (1.88 m)	220 lb (100 kg)	Feb 7, 2007
Chad Jones; ATH	Recruit ratings: Scout: Rivals: (79)				
Jarvis Jones; OL	Rosenberg, Texas	Lamar Cons High School	6 ft 7 in (2.01 m)	250 lb (110 kg)	Dec 4, 2006
Jarvis Jones; OL	Recruit ratings: Scout: Rivals: (71)				
Phelon Jones; ATH	Mobile, Alabama	McGill-Toolen High School	6 ft 1 in (1.85 m)	185 lb (84 kg)	Dec 10, 2006
Phelon Jones; ATH	Recruit ratings: Scout: Rivals: (81)				
Mitch Joseph; TE	New Iberia, Louisiana	Catholic High School	6 ft 4 in (1.93 m)	243 lb (110 kg)	Apr 1, 2006
Mitch Joseph; TE	Recruit ratings: Scout: Rivals: (78)				
Jarrett Lee; QB	Brenham, Texas	Brenham High School	6 ft 2 in (1.88 m)	192 lb (87 kg)	May 31, 2006
Jarrett Lee; QB	Recruit ratings: Scout: Rivals: (81)				
Ernest McCoy; OL	Belle Glade, Florida	Glades Central High School	6 ft 5 in (1.96 m)	330 lb (150 kg)	Dec 4, 2006
Ernest McCoy; OL	Recruit ratings: Scout: Rivals: (77)				
Drake Nevis; DT	Marrero, Louisiana	John Ehret High School	6 ft 1 in (1.85 m)	281 lb (127 kg)	Dec 10, 2006
Drake Nevis; DT	Recruit ratings: Scout: Rivals: (74)				
Stevan Ridley; ATH	Natchez, Mississippi	Trinity Episcopal School	6 ft 0 in (1.83 m)	211 lb (96 kg)	Mar 27, 2006
Stevan Ridley; ATH	Recruit ratings: Scout: Rivals: (78)				
Alex Russian; TE	Round Rock, Texas	Round Rock High School	6 ft 4 in (1.93 m)	231 lb (105 kg)	Jun 19, 2006
Alex Russian; TE	Recruit ratings: Scout: Rivals: (78)				
Terrance Toliver; WR	Hempstead, Texas	Hempstead High School	6 ft 4 in (1.93 m)	185 lb (84 kg)	Feb 6, 2007
Terrance Toliver; WR	Recruit ratings: Scout: Rivals: (86)				
John Williams; ATH	Breaux Bridge, Louisiana	Breaux Bridge High School	5 ft 11 in (1.80 m)	175 lb (79 kg)	Mar 4, 2006
John Williams; ATH	Recruit ratings: Scout: Rivals: (76)				
Overall recruit ranking: Scout: #5 Rivals: #4
Note: In many cases, Scout, Rivals, 247Sports, On3, and ESPN may conflict in their listings of height and weight.; In these cases, the average was taken. ESPN grades are on a 100-point scale.; Sources: "LSU Commit List 2007". Rivals.; "Scout.com Football Recruiting: LSU". Scout.; "2007 Player Commitments – LSU". ESPN.; "Scout.com Team Recruiting Rankings". Scout.; "2007 Team Ranking". Rivals.com.

=== Key losses ===
- Dwayne Bowe, WR, first round draft pick
- Craig Davis, WR, first round draft pick
- LaRon Landry, S, first round draft pick
- JaMarcus Russell, QB, first overall draft pick
- Justin Vincent, RB, 2003 SEC Championship & Sugar Bowl MVP

== Schedule ==
The schedule was ranked as the No. 3 toughest home schedule.

Date	Time	Opponent	Rank	Site	TV	Result	Attendance
August 30	7:00 p.m.	at Mississippi State	No. 2	Davis Wade Stadium; Starkville, MS (rivalry)	ESPN	W 45–0	50,112
September 8	8:15 p.m.	No. 9 Virginia Tech*	No. 2	Tiger Stadium; Baton Rouge, LA (College GameDay)	ESPN	W 48–7	92,739
September 15	7:00 p.m.	Middle Tennessee*	No. 2	Tiger Stadium; Baton Rouge, LA	PPV	W 44–0	92,407
September 22	2:30 p.m.	No. 12 South Carolina	No. 2	Tiger Stadium; Baton Rouge, LA	CBS	W 28–16	92,530
September 29	11:00 a.m.	at Tulane*	No. 2	Louisiana Superdome; New Orleans, LA (Battle for the Rag)	ESPN2	W 34–9	58,769
October 6	7:00 p.m.	No. 9 Florida	No. 1	Tiger Stadium; Baton Rouge, LA (rivalry) (College GameDay)	CBS	W 28–24	92,910
October 13	2:30 p.m.	at No. 17 Kentucky	No. 1	Commonwealth Stadium; Lexington, KY	CBS	L 37–43 ^{3OT}	70,902
October 20	8:00 p.m.	No. 17 Auburn	No. 4	Tiger Stadium; Baton Rouge, LA (Tiger Bowl)	ESPN	W 30–24	92,630
November 3	4:00 p.m.	at No. 17 Alabama	No. 3	Bryant–Denny Stadium; Tuscaloosa, AL (rivalry)	CBS	W 41–34	92,138
November 10	7:00 p.m.	Louisiana Tech*^{†}	No. 2	Tiger Stadium; Baton Rouge, LA	PPV	W 58–10	92,512
November 17	2:30 p.m.	at Ole Miss	No. 1	Vaught–Hemingway Stadium; Oxford, MS (Magnolia Bowl)	CBS	W 41–24	60,850
November 23	1:30 p.m.	Arkansas	No. 1	Tiger Stadium; Baton Rouge, LA (Battle for the Boot)	CBS	L 48–50 ^{3OT}	92,606
December 1	3:00 p.m.	vs. No. 14 Tennessee	No. 7	Georgia Dome; Atlanta, GA (SEC Championship Game)	CBS	W 21–14	73,832
January 7, 2008	6:30 p.m.	vs. No. 1 Ohio State*	No. 2	Louisiana Superdome; New Orleans, LA (BCS National Championship Game) (College GameDay)	FOX	W 38–24	79,651
*Non-conference game; ^{†}Homecoming; Rankings from AP Poll (and BCS standings, after October 14) - Released prior to game; All times are in Central time

Schedule Source:

== Rankings ==
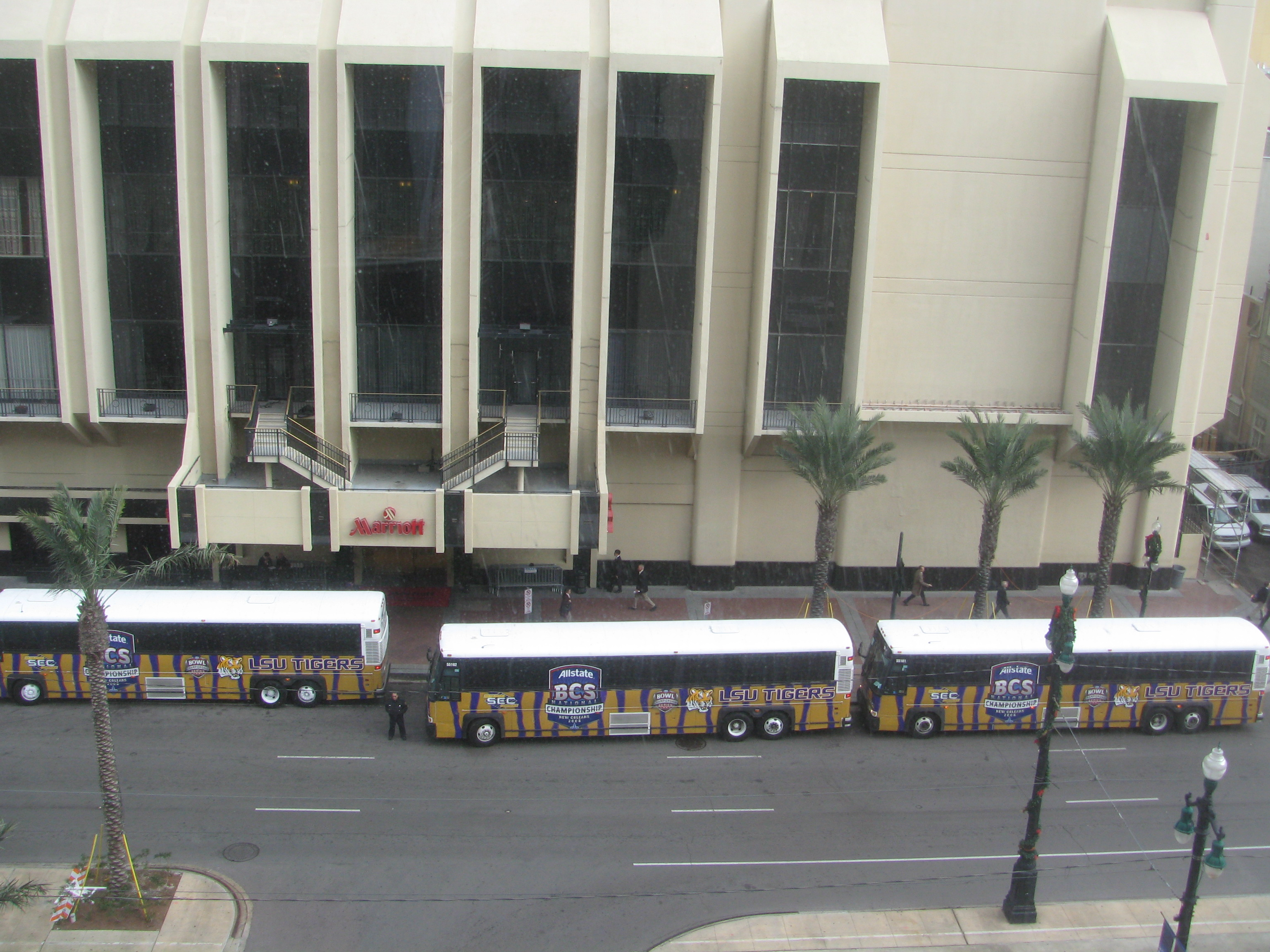
The LSU team bus at New Orleans Marriott viewed from Sheraton New Orleans

Ranking movements Legend: ██ Increase in ranking ██ Decrease in ranking
	Week															
Poll	Pre	1	2	3	4	5	6	7	8	9	10	11	12	13	14	Final
AP	2	2	2	2	2	1	1	5	3	3	2	1	1	5	2	1
Coaches	2	2	2	2	2	2	1	5	3	3	2	1	1	7	2	1
Harris	Not released				2	2	1	5	3	3	2	1	1	5	2	Not released
BCS	Not released							4	3	3	2	1	1	7	2	Not released

== Game summaries ==
=== Mississippi State ===
Team	1	2	3	4	Total
• LSU	3	14	14	14	45
Mississippi St	0	0	0	0	0

- Date: August 30
- Location: Davis Wade Stadium, Starkville, Mississippi

LSU and Mississippi State kicked off the 2007 college football season in a Thursday night SEC contest broadcast live on ESPN. Through much of the first half it appeared as though Mississippi State was up to the daunting task of challenging the Tigers, then the #2-ranked team in the country behind only USC, as MSU clung to a 3–0 deficit until the end of the second quarter, when LSU scored 14 points in the last six minutes of the first half, opening the door for the Tigers to cruise to the final 45–0 margin.

LSU K Colt David warmed up the scoreboard for the Tigers' offense with a 27-yard field goal with 6:28 remaining in the first quarter. Tigers' RB Keiland Williams would score twice in the second quarter on one-yard runs with 5:52, then 0:00 on the clock to push LSU's lead to 17–0 at the half. In the third quarter, the Tigers' distanced themselves with two eleven-yard touchdown passes from QB Matt Flynn to WR Early Doucet (12:53) and RB Charles Scott (2:09), bringing the score to 31–0 to start the fourth quarter. LSU backup QB Ryan Perriloux sealed the Tigers' victory in the fourth quarter with a three-yard touchdown scramble (8:20), followed by a 15-yard touchdown pass to WR Brandon LaFell (5:45). LSU's dominance included earning 22 first downs to MSU's 9 and yielding MSU just ten rushing yards on 26 carries. LSU FB Jacob Hester led the Tigers with 14 carries for 72 yards (4.9 yards per carry), while Early Doucet paced LSU's passing attack with 9 catches for 78 yards, including the 11-yard touchdown strike he caught in the third quarter; he was the only LSU receiver to catch more than one pass. For MSU, RB Anthony Dixon led the Bulldogs on the ground with just 29 yards on 13 carries (2.2 average). RB Arnil Stallworth led MSU with only 3 pass receptions for 33 yards.

LSU starting QB Matt Flynn paced his team's offense by completing 12 of 19 passes for 128 yards and two touchdowns and rushing 11 times for 42 yards. Ryan Perriloux ran the Tigers' offense well in relief duty, completing 2 of 3 passes for 21 yards and a touchdown and running 3 times for 12 yards and another score. For MSU, QB Michael Henig completed just 11 of 28 passes on his way to a school record-tying six interception-performance. He was sacked three times for a cumulative loss of 30 yards.

Defensively, LSU LB Ali Highsmith led the Tigers with eight total tackles. Tigers' S Craig Steltz returned three of MSU's six interceptions a total of 100 yards. MSU LB Dominic Douglas led all tacklers with nine total, in his first career game with the Bulldogs.

=== Virginia Tech ===
Team	1	2	3	4	Total
Virginia Tech	0	0	7	0	7
• LSU	14	10	10	14	48

- Date: September 8
- Location: Tiger Stadium, Baton Rouge, Louisiana
- Game start: 8:05 p.m. CDT
- Referee: Jeff Flanagan
- TV announcers (ESPN): Brent Musburger, Kirk Herbstreit and Lisa Salters

The ESPN College GameDay crew was in Baton Rouge, Louisiana for this important non-conference matchup between two top-10 teams. LSU entered the game ranked No. 2 while Virginia Tech was ranked #9. With both teams having excellent defenses the game was expected to be a low-scoring affair. LSU, however, on their first possession drove the ball 80+ yards for a touchdown. The next time they got the ball they did the same thing. LSU continued to shock the Virginia Tech defense all night as it racked up 48 points to eventually win the game 48–7.

=== Middle Tennessee State ===
Team	1	2	3	4	Total
Middle Tennessee St	0	0	0	0	0
• LSU	10	13	21	0	44

- Date: September 15
- Location: Tiger Stadium, Baton Rouge, Louisiana

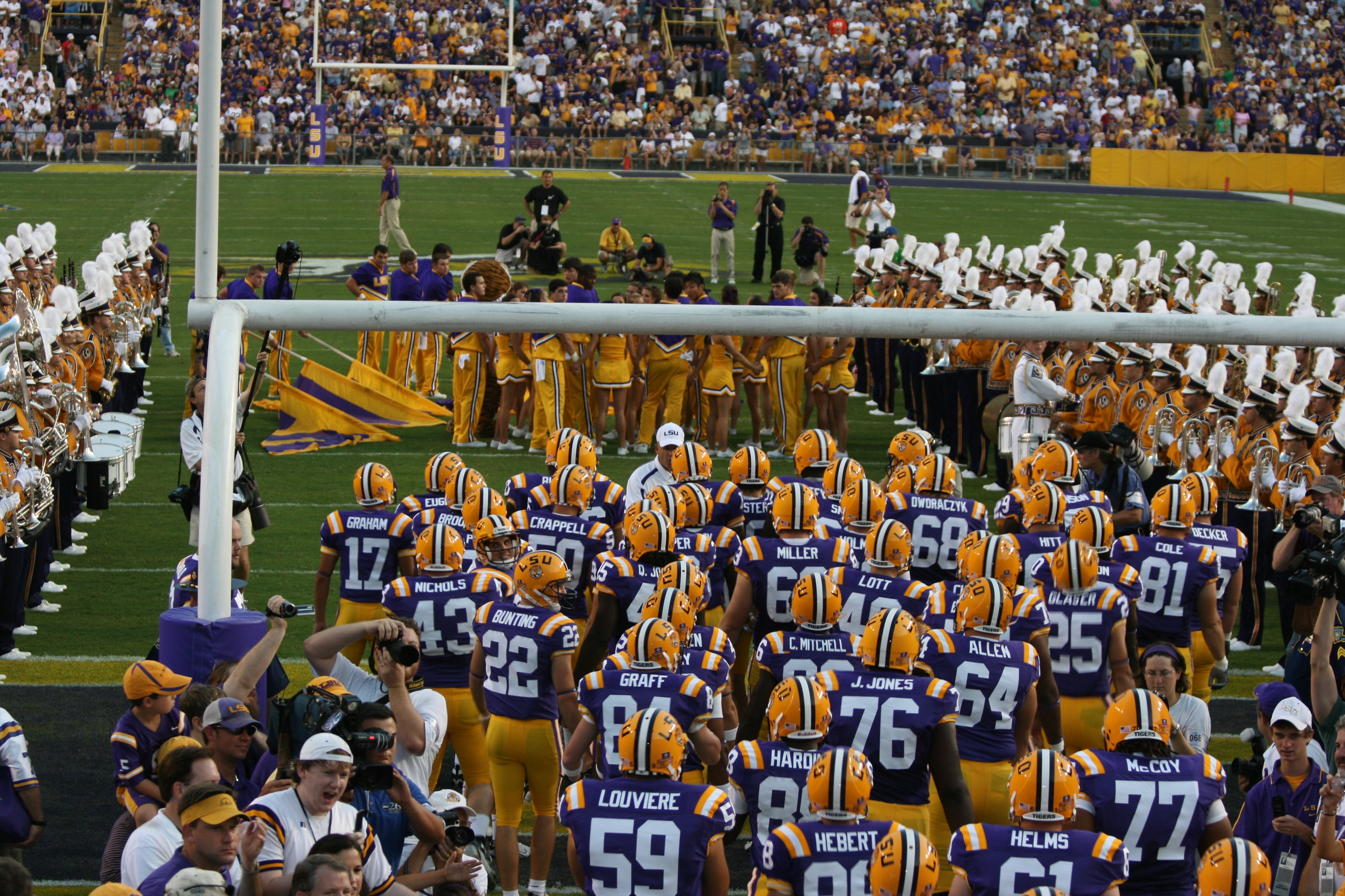
Second ranked LSU comes onto the field at the start of the game versus Middle Tennessee State.

Second ranked LSU played Middle Tennessee State in front of a sold out crowd in Tiger Stadium. Head coach Les Miles didn't play starting QB Matt Flynn because of an ankle injury he suffered during the week, and to rest him for next weeks game at home against the South Carolina Gamecocks. Instead, he started Sophomore Ryan Perrilloux who threw 20–26 passing for 298 passing yards to help lead LSU to a 44–0 win against MTSU. Senior WR Early Doucet didn't play to rest for next weeks game as well. LSU held Middle Tennessee to a total of 90 yards on offense. LSU only allowed 9 yards rushing in the game against the same MTSU team that put up 264 yards of total rushing against Louisville the week before. LSU won the game 44–0.

=== South Carolina ===
Team	1	2	3	4	Total
South Carolina	7	0	0	9	16
• LSU	7	14	7	0	28

- Date: September 22
- Location: Tiger Stadium, Baton Rouge, Louisiana
- TV announcers (CBS): Verne Lundquist (play-by-play) Gary Danielson (color), Tracy Wolfson (sideline)

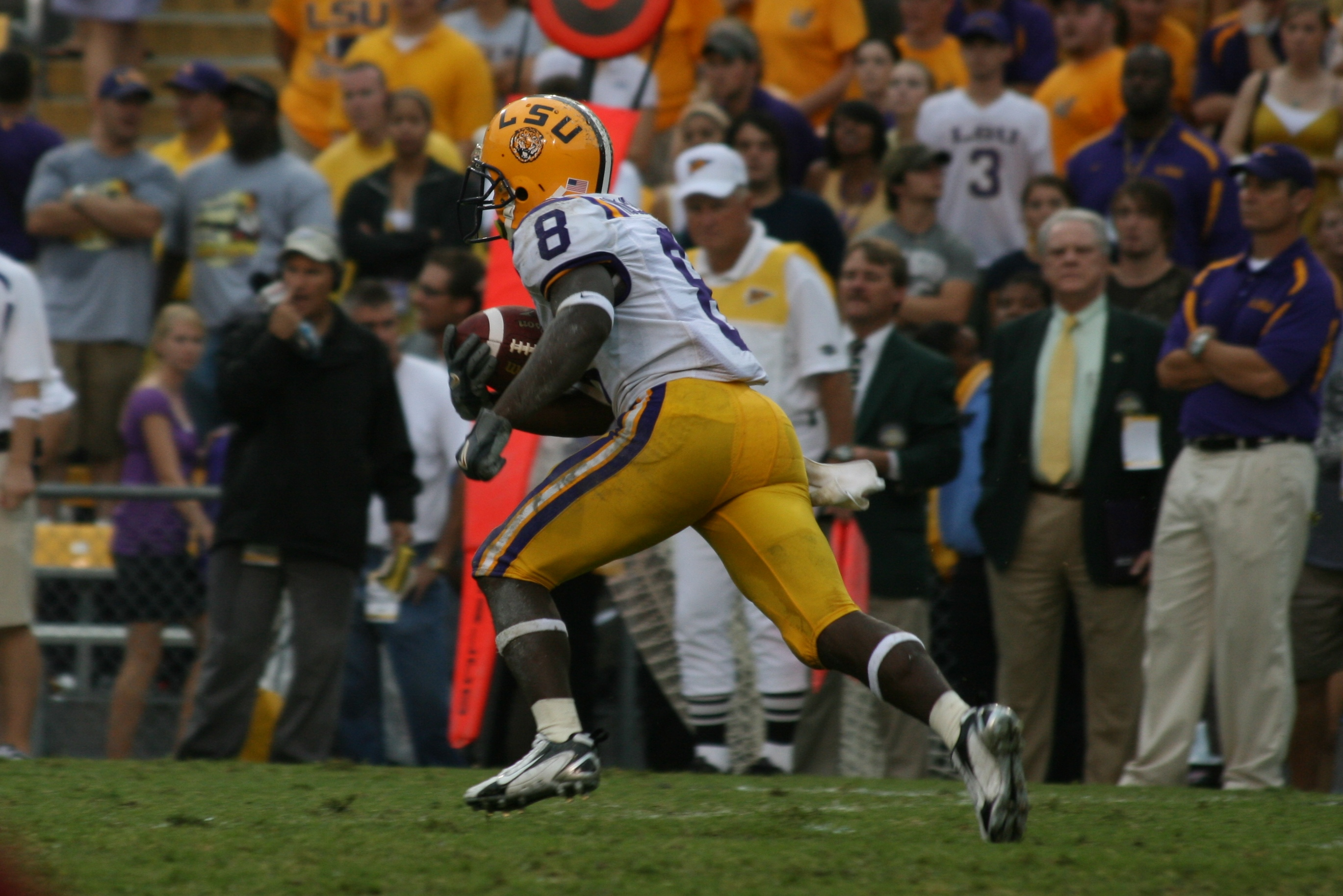
LSU WR Trindon Holliday returns a kickoff in the second half against South Carolina.

#14 South Carolina, coached by Steve Spurrier, came into Tiger Stadium on a rainy Saturday afternoon. The game, broadcast nationally by CBS, was messy due to the wet conditions, and South Carolina took an early 7–0 lead. LSU responded by scoring two unanswered touchdowns to make it 14–7. LSU again drove down into South Carolina territory but the drive stalled and the Tigers lined up to kick a field goal. The kick was a fake, perfectly executed by QB Matt Flynn and K Colt David, which saw David take an over-the-head no look toss from Flynn into the end zone for a touchdown. The play would go on to be selected as the ESPN/Pontiac Game Changing Performance for week 4 of the 2007 season. South Carolina would score again late in the fourth quarter but it wasn't enough and the Tigers won the game 28–16.

=== Tulane ===
Team	1	2	3	4	Total
• LSU	7	3	10	14	34
Tulane	0	9	0	0	9

- Date: September 29
- Location: Louisiana Superdome, New Orleans, Louisiana

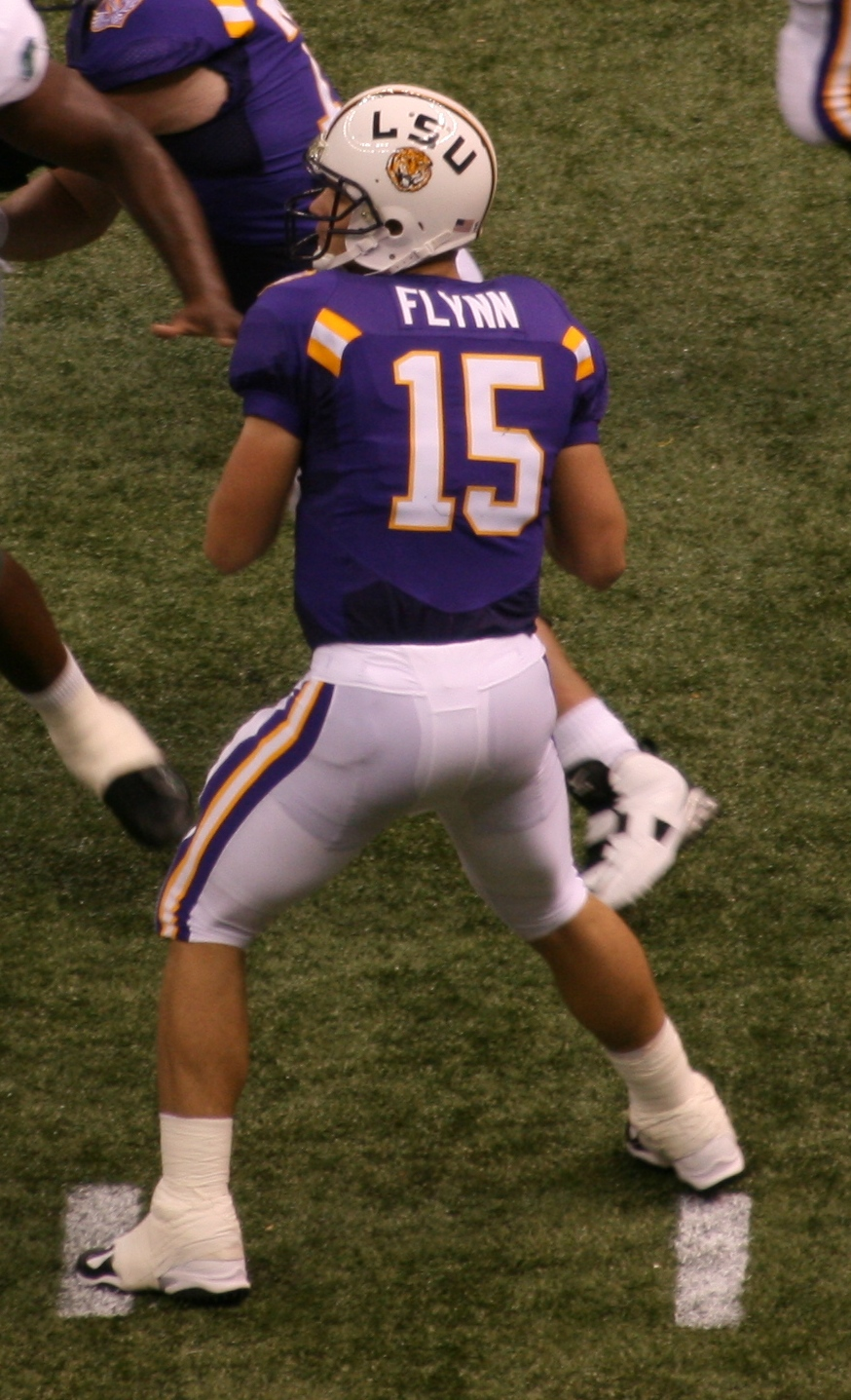
LSU QB Matt Flynn drops back to pass against Tulane.

LSU played Tulane in a recently renewed rivalry that stretches all the way back to LSU's first football game in 1893. Even though the game was played at the Louisiana Superdome, Tulane's home stadium, it was a virtual home game for LSU considering it is only approximately 80 miles (130 km) away from Baton Rouge. The Tigers started out slow and Tulane took a 9–7 lead late in the first half. LSU would score a field goal to go into halftime with a 10–9 lead. The second half saw the Tigers pull away from the Green Wave and LSU won the game 34–9.

LSU and Tulane both wore special uniforms designed by Nike to honor Hurricane Katrina victims. The new designs will be sold at stores throughout the city and proceeds will benefit Nike's Let Me Play New Orleans fund to help rebuild New Orleans through Sport. LSU's uniforms consisted of white pants and a purple jersey and a white helmet. This is only the second time in history that LSU has worn a white helmet. The other time came in the 1997 Independence Bowl against Notre Dame.

The LSU victory, along with Southern California's close game with Washington, pushed LSU to the No. 1 ranking in the AP Poll, with 1,593 points and 33 first-place votes just over Southern California's 1,591 points and 32 first-place votes; however the Trojans remained No. 1 in the Coaches Poll, keeping a more substantial lead: 1,483 points and 45 first-place votes to LSU's 1,454 points and 14 first-place votes.

=== Florida ===
Team	1	2	3	4	Total
Florida	3	14	7	0	24
• LSU	0	7	7	14	28

- Date: October 6
- Location: Tiger Stadium, Baton Rouge, Louisiana
- TV announcers (CBS): Verne Lundquist (play-by-play), Gary Danielson (color), Tracy Wolfson (sideline)

Scoring summary
1	11:19	Florida	Joey Ijjas 31-yard field goal	Florida 3-0
2	13:45	Florida	Kestahn Moore 2-yard pass from Tim Tebow (Joey Ijjas kick)	Florida 10-0
2	6:08	LSU	Ryan Perrilloux 1-yard run (Colt David kick)	Florida 10-7
2	2:23	Florida	Tim Tebow 9-yard run (Joey Ijjas kick)	Florida 17-7
3	7:49	LSU	Keiland Williams 4-yard run (Colt David kick)	Florida 17-14
3	5:16	Florida	Cornelius Ingram 37-yard pass from Tim Tebow (Joey Ijjas kick)	Florida 24-14
4	10:15	LSU	Demetrius Byrd 4-yard pass from Matt Flynn (Colt David kick)	Florida 24-21
4	1:09	LSU	Jacob Hester 1-yard run (Colt David kick)	LSU 28-24

In the pre-season, this game was named as one of candidates for the 10 most important games of 2007, with the 2006 contest having made a significant impact on determining the national championship (Florida finished #1, LSU #3); it would also serve as the first true road test for Gator's starting quarterback Tim Tebow.

In preparation for the matchup, CBS staged The Early Show from the LSU campus on the Friday morning before the game. ESPN also chose LSU as the site for College GameDay. It was the second time in the 2007 season that ESPN College GameDay was broadcast from LSU.

The Gators took an early lead by kicking a field goal on their first drive. Two drives later, the Gators mounted a 12-play drive that culminated in a Tim Tebow two-yard pass to Kestahn Moore to put the Gators up by ten. LSU immediately countered with a long drive of their own, going 80 yards in 16 plays, scoring on a Ryan Perrilloux option play to cut the Gator lead to 10–7. The Gators marched down the field again and scored on a Tebow run to put their lead back at 10 with 2:23 to play in the first half. LSU moved the ball right before the half, but kicker Colt David missed a 43-yard field goal.

In the second half, LSU took the ensuing drive but were stopped by the Gator defense. Appearing to kick another long field goal, LSU instead ran a brilliant fake with the holder—quarterback Matt Flynn—who scooted eight yards for the first down. The Tigers scored on a Keiland Williams run shortly thereafter.

The Gators answered the LSU drive with a quick 3-play drive to score on a 37-yard Tebow pass to Cornelius Ingram. Craig Steltz missed an assignment on the play which left Ingram wide open on the post pattern. Florida started the fourth quarter with a 24–14 lead.

However, the Tigers were not to be denied. After missing another relatively short field goal, LSU took advantage of an errant pass by Tim Tebow which hit Ingram in the helmet. The Tigers drove down the field, and Flynn hit Demetrius Byrd for a 3-yard touchdown to cut the Gator lead to 3.

On the final LSU drive, the Tigers converted several fourth down plays, including one by Jacob Hester where he made a great second effort to surge ahead to just get the first down. Hester scored a short touchdown with 1:06 to play in the game, giving the Tigers a 28–24 lead.

On the final drive, Florida gained 30 yards, but a Hail Mary pass as time expired was batted down by Chad Jones, sealing the LSU victory.

Much of the hype during game week concerned the fate of starting safety and captain, Tony Joiner, who was arrested earlier in the week for what was later termed a "misunderstanding." The owner of the towing company where Joiner was arrested was quoted as having received over 200 calls from Florida fans, several of them death threats to him and his family. Joiner played but did not start the game.

=== Kentucky ===
Team	1	2	3	4	OT	2OT	3OT	Total
LSU	0	17	10	0	7	3	0	37
• Kentucky	7	7	7	6	7	3	6	43

- Date: October 13
- Location: Commonwealth Stadium, Lexington, Kentucky
- TV announcers (CBS): Verne Lundquist (play-by-play), Gary Danielson (color), Tracy Wolfson (sideline)

After suffering their first loss of the season to No. 17 Kentucky, LSU fell to No. 5 in the polls. LSU blew a 13-point lead in the 3rd quarter.

=== Auburn ===
Team	1	2	3	4	Total
Auburn	7	10	0	7	24
• LSU	7	0	6	17	30

- Date: October 20
- Location: Tiger Stadium, Baton Rouge, Louisiana

One week after their brutal triple overtime loss to Kentucky, LSU returned home for another tough matchup: number 17 Auburn. Auburn jumped out to an early 7–0 lead when Brandon Cox found Montez Billings. A 46-yard screen pass to Keiland Williams for a TD tied it, but Auburn took a 17–7 lead into halftime when LSU backup quarterback Ryan Perrilloux fumbled, and Carl Stewart ran for a one-yard touchdown after LSU's Trindon Holliday had saved a touchdown. Wes Bynum's field goal capped the first half scoring. Two Colt David field goals pulled LSU within four before Matt Flynn hit Jacob Hester on a five-yard screen and David kicked another field goal to put LSU on top 23–17. But, Auburn wasn't done, as they drove down the field and scored a touchdown. LSU had 3:13 left, and they put themselves in good position to kick a game-winning field goal on Auburn's 22-yard line. However, with a chance to make the kick and a timeout, LSU coach Les Miles chose to gamble (as he has so often during the year) and go for a touchdown. It turned out as he planned however, as LSU won on Matt Flynn's 22-yard pass to Demetrius Byrd. Miles later said he thought he had plenty of time, and reviews of the play verified that the pass was caught with 4 seconds remaining, but the clock ran until the referee signaled TD with 1 second remaining. Under NCAA rules, the clock keeper allows the clock to run when a reception is made in the endzone until a signal is given by the endzone referee. Had the ball been incomplete, the clock keeper would have stopped the clock immediately upon the ball hitting the ground. This likely would have left LSU with 3–4 seconds on the clock and a chance to run another play.

=== Alabama ===
Team	1	2	3	4	Total
• LSU	10	7	7	17	41
Alabama	3	17	7	7	34

- Date: November 3
- Location: Bryant–Denny Stadium, Tuscaloosa, Alabama
- TV announcers (CBS): Verne Lundquist (play-by-play), Gary Danielson (color), Tracy Wolfson (sideline)

In the game dubbed "Saban Bowl I", in which Nick Saban's new Alabama team faced an LSU team that featured several players Saban himself had recruited during his tenure in Baton Rouge, the Tide found itself in an SEC shootout. Alabama struck first with an early Leigh Tiffin field goal. However, the Tigers then scored 17 unanswered points, and it appeared that the game could have been a blowout. Unfortunately for LSU though, Bama wasn't finished yet. They scored 17 points in the second quarter, and the Crimson Tide led 20–17 at halftime. The third quarter saw no scoring until the last two minutes. With 1:19 left, Keith Brown caught a 14-yard touchdown pass to make the score 27–17. The Tigers quickly responded on their next drive when Matt Flynn threw a 61-yard touchdown pass to Demetrius Byrd to bring the Tiger back to within 3 points of Bama. Then, with 11:21 left in the game, Colt David kicked a 49-yard field goal to tie it up 27–27. The Tide took the lead again when Javier Arenas returned a punt for a 61-yard touchdown. With 2:49 left, LSU was able to tie the game again. It appeared the game might go into overtime until John Parker Wilson was hit in the backfield by Safety Chad Jones and fumbled the ball and LSU recovered on the Tide's 4-yard line. They then ran it in for a touchdown and won when Alabama was unable to respond. The Tigers had 475 total yards compared to Alabama's 254. Alabama was able to stay in the game thanks to 3 interceptions the defense was able to force and 130 yards in penalties that LSU accumulated. John Parker Wilson was 14 for 40 with 234 yards, 3 touchdowns, and an interception.

=== Louisiana Tech ===
Team	1	2	3	4	Total
Louisiana Tech	0	7	0	3	10
• LSU	10	17	17	14	58

- Date: November 10
- Location: Tiger Stadium, Baton Rouge, Louisiana

=== Ole Miss ===
Team	1	2	3	4	Total
• LSU	14	0	10	17	41
Ole Miss	7	0	3	14	24

- Date: November 17
- Location: Vaught–Hemingway Stadium, Oxford, Mississippi
- TV announcers (CBS): Verne Lundquist (play-by-play), Gary Danielson (color), Tracy Wolfson (sideline)

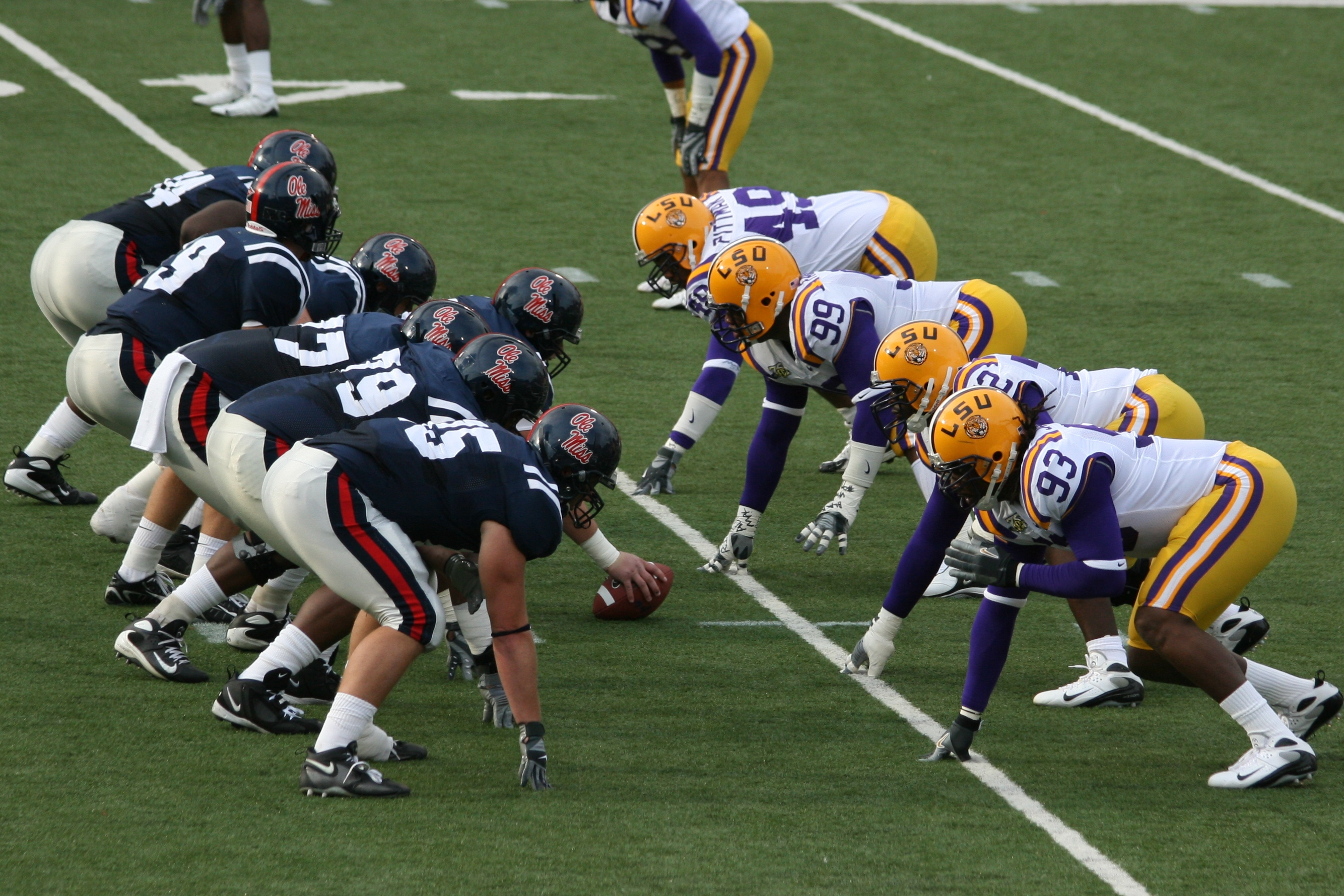
Tyson Jackson (93), Glenn Dorsey (72), Marlon Favorite (99) and Kirston Pittman (49) line up against the Ole Miss offense on November 17, 2007.

=== Arkansas ===
Team	1	2	3	4	OT	2OT	3OT	Total
• Arkansas	0	7	14	7	7	7	8	50
LSU	6	0	15	7	7	7	6	48

- Date: November 23
- TV announcers (CBS): Verne Lundquist (play-by-play), Gary Danielson (color), Tracy Wolfson (sideline)

After coming off of a win against Ole' Miss, the once again No. 1 ranked LSU Tigers lost again in a triple overtime battle against the Arkansas Razorbacks. The loss dropped them back to No. 7 and the loss also jeopardized their chances of getting into the BCS National Championship.

=== SEC Championship Game: Tennessee ===
Team	1	2	3	4	Total
Tennessee	7	0	7	0	14
• LSU	6	0	7	8	21

- Date: December 1
- Location: Georgia Dome, Atlanta
- TV announcers (CBS): Verne Lundquist (play-by-play), Gary Danielson (color), Tracy Wolfson (sideline)

Tennessee and LSU faced off in the SEC Championship Game. They last met in the SECCG in 2001. LSU won that game over the favored Volunteers, eliminating them from a trip to the Rose Bowl for the national championship. LSU last played in the SECCG in 2005, losing to Georgia. Tennessee last played in the SECCG in 2004, losing to Auburn. Matt Flynn was sidelined by injury, and the Tennessee defense delivered its best performance of the year, holding the Ryan Perrilloux-led Tigers to a season low 21 points. However, the LSU defense intercepted two passes from Tennessee quarterback Erik Ainge, including one late in the fourth quarter to secure the win. In the wake of this victory, LSU jumped from 7th to 2nd in the BCS standings and became the first two-loss team to play in the BCS National Championship Game.

=== 2008 Allstate BCS National Championship Game ===
Team	1	2	3	4	Total
• LSU	3	21	7	7	38
Ohio St	10	0	7	7	24

- Date: January 7
- Location: Louisiana Superdome, New Orleans, Louisiana
- Television network: Fox

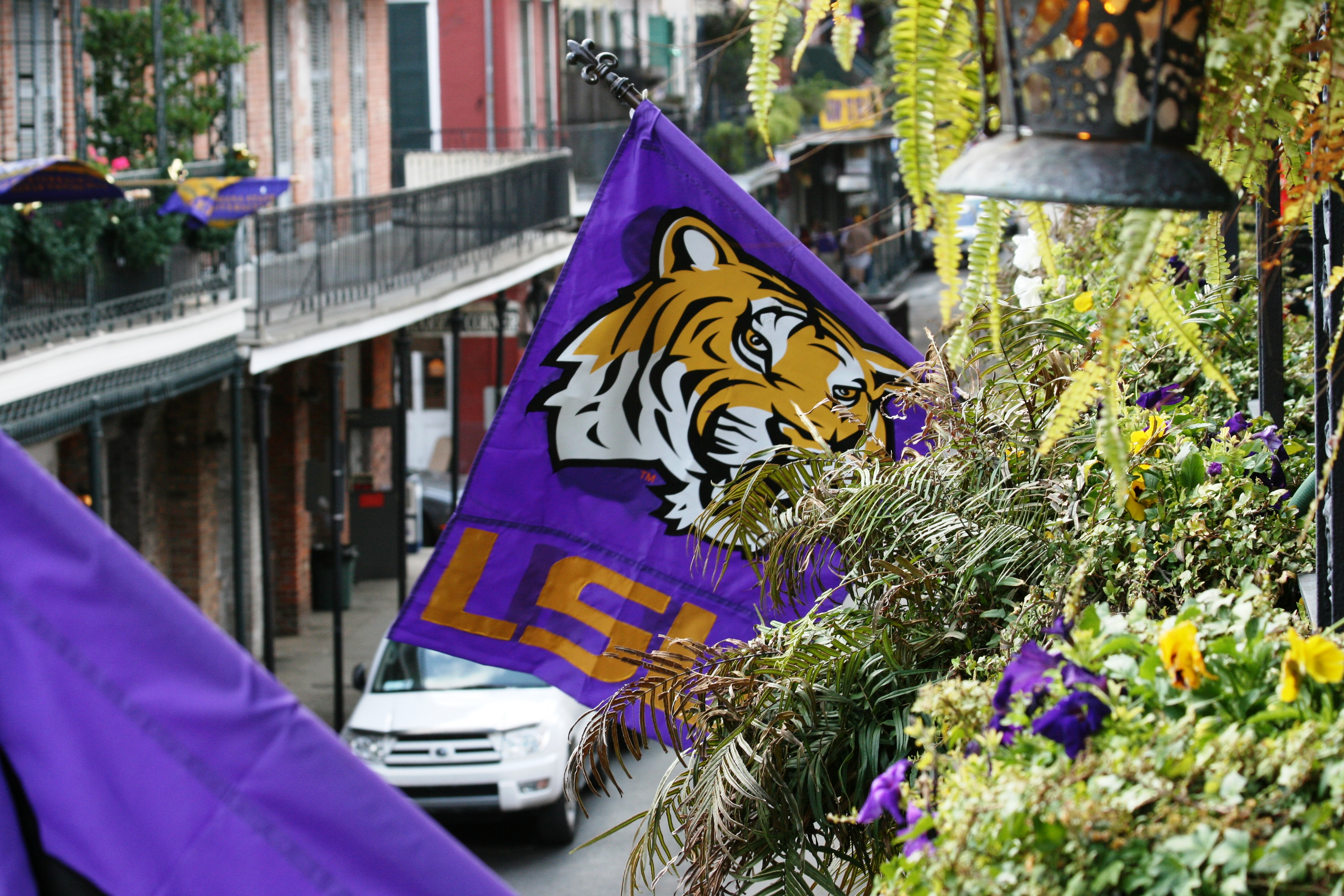
An LSU flag hangs in the New Orleans French Quarter on the day of the 2008 BCS National Championship Game.

After coming out of a two loss season with a win in the SEC championship game, the LSU Tigers took on the top ranked Ohio State Buckeyes and defeated them 38–24. This win made the LSU Tigers the first team to win two BCS National Championships.

== Honors ==
Player	Honors
Darry Beckwith	First Team All-SEC (SEC Coaches)
Ciron Black	Second Team All-SEC (SEC Coaches)
Colt David	First Team All-SEC (SEC Coaches)
Glenn Dorsey	Outland Trophy Winner; Lombardi Award Winner; Lott Trophy Winner; Nagurski Trophy Winner; Bednarik Award Finalist; First-Team All-American (AP, AFCA, FWAA, Walter Camp Foundation, ESPN, CBSSports.com, CNNSI.com, Rivals.com, Sporting News); SEC Defensive Player of the Year (SEC Coaches); First-Team All-SEC (SEC Coaches); SEC Defensive Lineman of the Week (Sept. 22 vs. South Carolina); SEC Defensive Player of the Week (Nov. 3 vs. Alabama); SEC Community Service Team Player of the Week (Nov. 3 vs. Alabama)
Patrick Fisher	First-Team All-SEC (SEC Coaches)
Matt Flynn	SEC Offensive Player of the Week (Oct. 20 vs. Auburn); 2008 BCS National Championship Game Offensive MVP
Jacob Hester	Second-Team All-SEC (SEC Coaches); SEC Offensive Player of the Week (Oct. 6 vs. Florida); Sporting News Player of the Week (Oct. 6 vs. Florida)
Ali Highsmith	First-Team All-American (CBSSports.com); Second-Team All-American (AP); Honorable Mention All-American (CNNSI.com); First-Team All-SEC (SEC Coaches); Senior Bowl South Team Defensive MVP
Trindon Holliday	SEC Special Teams Player of the Week (Nov. 17 vs. Ole Miss)
Chevis Jackson	Honorable Mention All-American (CNNSI.com); First-Team All-SEC (SEC Coaches)
Ricky Jean-Francois	2008 BCS National Championship Game Defensive MVP
Herman Johnson	First-Team All-SEC (SEC Coaches)
Chad Jones	First-Team Freshman All-American (Sporting News); Honorable Mention Freshman All-American (CollegeFootballNews.com); Freshman All-SEC (Coaches, Rivals.com)
Ryan Perrilloux	SEC Championship Game MVP
Kirston Pittman	SEC Defensive Lineman of the Week (Sept. 8 vs. Virginia Tech)
Craig Steltz	Thorpe Award Finalist; First-Team All-American (AP, Walter Camp Foundation, ESPN, CBSSports.com, CNNSI.com, Rivals.com); First-Team All-SEC (SEC Coaches); Louisiana Defensive Player of the Week (Aug. 30 at Mississippi State); SEC Defensive Player of the Week (Nov. 17 vs. Ole Miss)
Terrance Toliver	Honorable Mention Freshman All-American (Sporting News); Freshman All-SEC (Coaches, Rivals.com)
Keiland Williams	Louisiana Offensive Player of the Week (Sept. 8 vs. Virginia Tech)

== White House visit ==
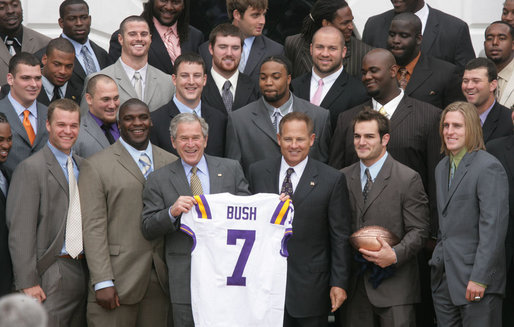
The Tigers at the White House

On April 7, 2008, the 2007 LSU Tigers football team traveled to the White House in Washington, D.C. to meet U.S. President George W. Bush.

== Roster ==
Wide receivers: 2 Demetrius Byrd – Junior; 8 Trindon Holliday – Sophomore; 1 Brandon LaFell – Sophomore; 28 Keith Maxwell – Junior; 10 Ricky Dixon – Freshman; 86 Chris Mitchell – Sophomore; 9 Early Doucet – Senior; 12 Quentin LeDay – Junior; 87 Jared Mitchell – Sophomore; 23 Josh McManus – Senior; 42 R.J. Gillen – Freshman; 25 Brady Glaser – Freshman; 14 Nafis Pickett—Freshman; 88 Ian Harding – Freshman; 27 August Mangin – Sophomore; 80 Terrence Toliver – Freshman; 33 Adam McClure – Freshman; Offensive lineman: 65 Lyle Hitt – Sophomore; 66 Max Holmes – Sophomore; 79 Herman Johnson – Junior; 73 Will Arnold – Senior; 78 Joseph Barksdale – Freshman; 76 Jarvis Jones – Freshman; 77 Ernest McCoy – Freshman; 55 Andrew Decker – Junior; 67 Mark Snyder – Freshman; 64 Matt Allen – Freshman; 59 Cole Louviere – Senior; 62 Robert Smith – Junior; 61 Trey Helms – Freshman; 68 Josh Dworaczyk – Freshman; 71 Carnell Stewart – Senior; 70 Ciron Black – Sophomore; Center: 74 Brett Helms – Junior; 57 Richard Dugas – Freshman; 63 Ryan Miller – Junior; 53 T-Bob Hebert – Freshman; Tight End: 41 Jordon Corbin – Freshman; 46 J.D. Lott – Freshman; 89 Keith Zinger – Senior; 85 Alex Russian – Freshman; 82 Richard Dickson – Sophomore; 83 Mitch Joseph – Freshman; 81 Mit Cole – Senior	Quarterback: 12 Jarrett Lee – Freshman; 15 Matt Flynn – Senior; 17 T. C. McCartney – Freshman; 13 Jimmy Welker – Senior; 14 Andrew Hatch – Sophomore; 11 Ryan Perriloux – Sophomore; Running back: 26 Richard Murphy – Freshman; 28 R.J. Jackson – Sophomore; 6 Joey Stutson – Sophomore; 32 Charles Scott – Sophomore; 37 Phillip Pigott – Junior; 5 Keiland Williams – Sophomore; Fullback: 18 Jacob Hester – Senior; 45 Quinn Johnson – Junior; 34 Stevan Ridley – Freshman; 30 Chad Baniecki – Junior; 40 Shawn Jordan – Senior; Defensive lineman: 96 Kentravis Aubrey – Freshman; 92 Drake Nevis – Freshman; 88 Donald Hains – Senior; 80 Efrain Tamayo- Freshman; Defensive end: 47 Tremaine Johnson – Junior; 84 Rahim Alem – Sophomore; 93 Tyson Jackson – Junior; 38 Anthony Zehyoue – Senior; 94 Will Blackwell – Freshman; 43 Caleb Angelle – Senior; 49 Kirston Pittman – Senior; 98 Sidell Corley – Freshman; 95 Lazarius Levingston – Freshman; 90 Ricky Jean Francois – Sophomore; Defensive backs: 44 Daniel Graff – Freshman; 33 Tyson Andrus – Sophomore; 29 Chris Hawkins – Sophomore; 5 Chad Moody – Sophomore; 2 Orlando Gunn – Freshman; 13 Donnie Chaucer – Senior; 25 Phelon Jones – Freshman; 23 Stefoin François – Freshman; 14 Ron Brooks – Freshman; 30 Joe Maltempi – Sophomore	Defensive tackles: 97 Al Woods – Sophomore; 99 Marlon Favorite – Junior; 72 Glenn Dorsey – Senior; 91 Charles Alexander – Junior; Cornerbacks: 31 John Williams – Freshman; 21 Chevis Jackson – Senior; 19 Jonathan Zenon – Senior; 4 Jai Eugene – Freshman; 22 Manuel David “freshman”; Linebackers: 48 Darry Beckwith – Junior; 7 Ali Highsmith – Senior; 54 Jacob Cutrera – Sophomore; 11 Kelvin Sheppard – Freshman; 52 Ace Foyil – Sophomore; 37 Paul Felio – Freshman; 53 Jonathan Nixon – Sophomore; 35 Luke Sanders – Senior; 43 Lydell Smith – Freshman; 51 Zachary Midulla – Freshman; 39 Blake Nichols – Freshman; 56 Perry Riley – Sophomore; Safety: 3 Chad Jones – Freshman; 24 Harry Coleman – Sophomore; 27 Curtis Taylor – Junior; 44 Danny McCray – Sophomore; 16 Craig Steltz – Senior; 17 Shomari Clemons – Freshman; Long snappers: 50 Joey Crappell – Freshman; 51 Jacob O'Hair – Senior; Kickers/Punters: 4 Ryan Anders – Freshman; 6 Colt David – Junior; 30 Josh Jasper – Freshman; 17 Josh Graham – Sophomore; 69 Sean Gaudet – Junior; 91 Trent Hebert – Freshman; 8 Steve Ochsner – Freshman; 36 Patrick Fisher – Senior; 39 Andrew Crutchfield – Freshman

Roster source: http://www.lsusports.net/SportSelect.dbml?SPSID=27812&SPID=2164&DB_OEM_ID=5200&SORT_ORDER=6&Q_SEASON=2007

== Coaching staff ==
Name	Title	First year at LSU	Alma mater
Les Miles	Head coach	2005	Michigan (1976)
Gary Crowton	Offensive coordinator	2007	BYU (1983)
Bo Pelini	Defensive coordinator	2005	Ohio State (1990)
Josh Henson	Tight ends coach/recruiting coordinator	2005	Oklahoma State (1998)
Earl Lane	Defensive line coach	2006	Northwood
Doug Mallory	Defensive backs coach	2005	Michigan (1988)
D.J. McCarthy	Wide receivers coach	2007	Washington (1994)
Bradley Dale Peveto	Special teams coordinator/linebackers coach	2005	SMU (1987)
Larry Porter	Asst. head coach/running backs/special teams	2005	Memphis (1996)
Greg Studrawa	Offensive line coach	2007	Bowling Green (1987)
Tommy Moffitt	Strength and conditioning coordinator	2000	Tennessee Tech (1986)
Mike Ekeler	Graduate assistant	2005	Kansas State (1995)
Glen Elarbee	Graduate assistant	2007	Middle Tennessee (2002)

== LSU Tigers in the 2008 National Football League Draft ==
Player	Position	Round	Pick	Overall	NFL team
Glenn Dorsey	Defensive tackle	1	5	5	Kansas City Chiefs
Chevis Jackson	Defensive back	3	5	68	Atlanta Falcons
Jacob Hester	Running back	3	6	69	San Diego Chargers
Early Doucet	Wide receiver	3	16	81	Arizona Cardinals
Craig Steltz	Safety	4	21	120	Chicago Bears
Matt Flynn	Quarterback	7	2	209	Green Bay Packers
Keith Zinger	Tight end	7	25	232	Atlanta Falcons

https://www.pro-football-reference.com/draft/2008.htm
