= Jonathan Zenon =

American football player (born 1984)

Profile
- Position: Cornerback

Personal information
- Born: August 2, 1984 (age 42); Lafayette, Louisiana, U.S.
- Listed height: 6 ft 0 in (1.83 m)
- Listed weight: 176 lb (80 kg)

Career information
- High school: Breaux Bridge (Breaux Bridge, Louisiana)
- College: Louisiana State
- NFL draft: 2008: undrafted

Career history
- New York Jets (2008)*; Cincinnati Bengals (2008)*; Jacksonville Jaguars (2008)*
- * Offseason or practice squad member only

Awards and highlights
- 2× BCS national champion (2003, 2007)

Jonathan Zenon (born August 2, 1984) is an American former football cornerback. A Louisiana native, he played for LSU from 2004 to 2007 and totaled 25 pass breakups and nine interceptions, including the game-winning interception return for touchdown in the 2007 SEC Championship Game that helped propel the Tigers to the 2007 national championship. After his playing career he entered coaching. He is currently the head football coach at Abbeville High School in Abbeville, Louisiana.

== Early life ==
Zenon was born in 1984 in Lafayette, Louisiana. He attended Breaux Bridge High School in Breaux Bridge, Louisiana. He played at the running back position at Breaux Bridge.

== LSU ==
He played college football for LSU from 2004 to 2008, appearing in 41 games, 30 as a starter. He finished his college career with 91 tackles, nine interceptions, and 25 pass breakups.

As a junior, he returned interceptions for touchdowns in the first two games of the 2006 season. He helped lead the 2006 team to a Sugar Bowl championship and a No. 3 ranking in the final AP Poll.

As a senior, he started all 14 games at left cornerback for LSU's 2007 national championship team. In the 2007 SEC Championship Game against Tennessee, with the Tigers trailing 14–13 with 9:54 remaining in the game, Zenon intercepted an Erik Ainge pass and returned it for the game-winning touchdown. Years later, Zenon recalled the play: "Our coaches gave us great looks throughout the week and as soon as I saw the formation, I knew exactly where to go. I just got in front of the ball." In his history of LSU football, Scott Rabalais described Zenon's interception as "a play for the ages." The pick was also ranked as one of the ten most memorable individual performances in the history of the SEC championship game.

== Professional football ==
Zenon went undrafted in the 2008 NFL draft. He was given a tryout by the Cleveland Browns and New Orleans Saints. He was then signed by the New York Jets as an undrafted free agent in May 2008, and was given a one-year contract at the end of July. He later signed with the Cincinnati Bengals but sustained a hamstring injury and was waived in August 2008 with an injury settlement. In December 2008, he was signed by the Jacksonville Jaguars to their practice squad.
