= 2007 Auburn Tigers football team =

American college football season

2007 Auburn Tigers football

Chick-fil-A Bowl champion

Chick-fil-A Bowl, W 23–20 ^{OT} vs. Clemson
- Conference: Southeastern Conference
- Western Division

Ranking
- Coaches: No. 14
- AP: No. 15
- Record: 9–4 (5–3 SEC)
- Head coach: Tommy Tuberville (9th season)
- Offensive coordinator: Al Borges (4th season; regular season); Tony Franklin (interim; bowl game)
- Offensive scheme: Gulf Coast
- Defensive coordinator: Will Muschamp (2nd season)
- Base defense: 4–3
- Home stadium: Jordan–Hare Stadium

2007 Southeastern Conference football standings
	Conf.			Overall
Team	W		L	W		L
Eastern Division
No. 12 Tennessee xy	6	–	2	10	–	4
No. 2 Georgia x%	6	–	2	11	–	2
No. 13 Florida	5	–	3	9	–	4
South Carolina	3	–	5	6	–	6
Kentucky	3	–	5	8	–	5
Vanderbilt	2	–	6	5	–	7
Western Division
No. 1 LSU x$#	6	–	2	12	–	2
No. 15 Auburn	5	–	3	9	–	4
Arkansas	4	–	4	8	–	5
Mississippi State	4	–	4	8	–	5
Alabama	4	–	4	7	–	6
Ole Miss	0	–	8	3	–	9
Championship: LSU 21, Tennessee 14
# – BCS National Champion; $ – BCS representative as conference champion; % – BCS at-large representative; x – Division champion/co-champions; y – Championship game participant; Alabama had 5 victories vacated by the NCAA in 2010. As such, the official record for Alabama is 2–6 (1–4).; Rankings from AP Poll

The 2007 Auburn Tigers football team represented Auburn University during the 2007 NCAA Division I FBS football season. Head coach Tommy Tuberville returned for his ninth season at Auburn, the third longest tenure among SEC head coaches in 2007. He was joined by returning offensive coordinator Al Borges and returning defensive coordinator Will Muschamp. Auburn played its eight-game home schedule at Jordan–Hare Stadium, the ninth largest on-campus stadium in the NCAA in 2007, seating 87,451. Conference foe Vanderbilt returned to the schedule while non-conference opponents South Florida and Tennessee Tech played the Tigers for the first time. The Tigers finished the season ranked #14 in the Coaches Poll and #15 in the AP Poll.

== Preseason ==
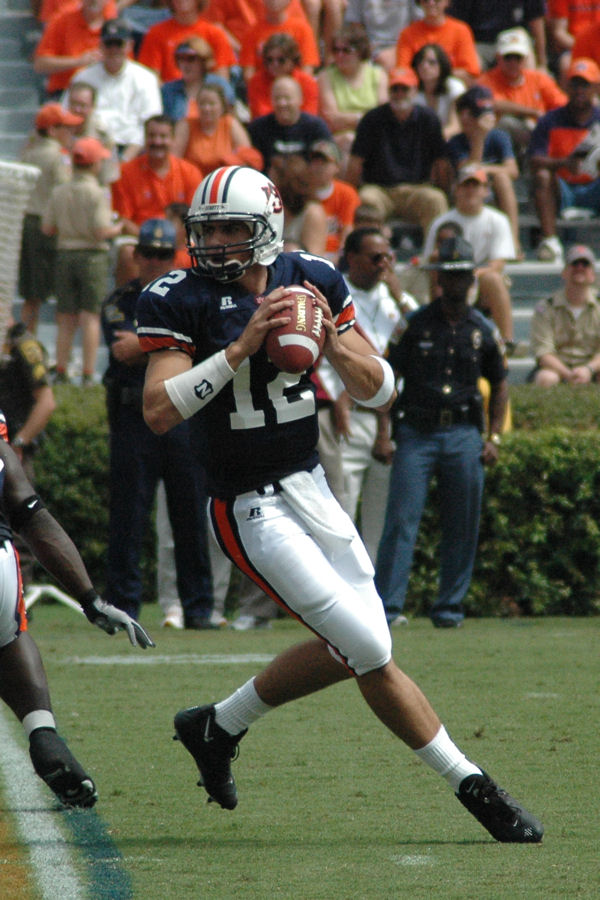
Senior Brandon Cox led AU.

Senior quarterback Brandon Cox returned for his third and final season as a starter, finally healthy after being hampered the entire 2006 season with injuries. Cox was joined in the backfield by a stable of talented backs including Brad Lester, Ben Tate and freshman Mario Fannin.

Auburn returned one of the best defensive lines in the SEC, if not the country, anchored by senior nose tackle Josh Thompson (43 tackles), senior defensive end and sack-leader Quentin Groves, and sophomore(RS) sensation Sen'Derrick Marks, who moved to end from defensive tackle.

Prior to the season, a new $2.9 million, 30-foot-high (9.1 m), 74-foot-wide (23 m) high-definition(HD) Daktronics LED video display was installed in the south end-zone of Jordan–Hare Stadium. Auburn was the first SEC school to install an HD video display and the second in the NCAA (after Texas' Godzillatron).

=== Preseason rankings ===
Auburn was ranked #14 in the initial USA Today Coaches Poll, a component of the Bowl Championship Series, released on August 3, 2007. Auburn's initial position in the AP poll was #18. Other preseason rankings for Auburn include:

# 11 – CBS SportsLine
# 12 – Rivals.com
# 12 – CollegeTOP25.com
# 14 – College Football News
# 16 – Sports Illustrated
# 16 – ESPN

# 16 – Sporting News
# 16 – NationalChamps.net
# 17 – Congrove
# 21 – Athlon Sports
# 23 – Lindy's Sports

=== Watchlists and honors ===
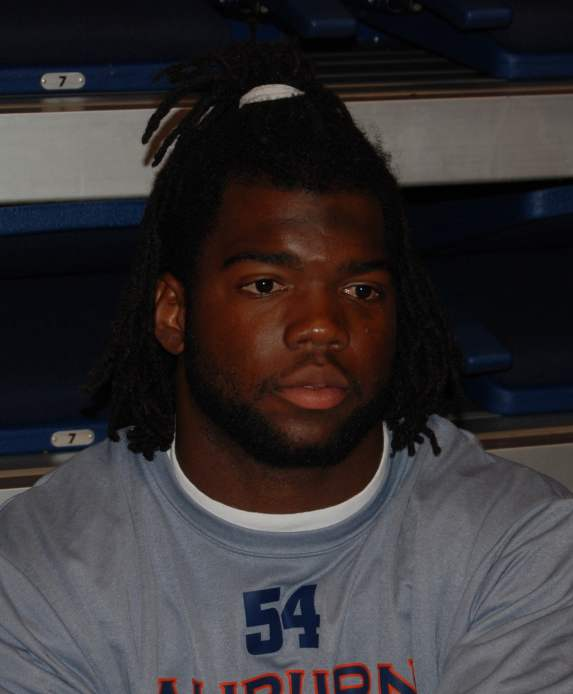
Defensive leader Quentin Groves

- Outland Trophy watchlist – King Dunlap
- Bronko Nagurski Trophy watchlist – Quentin Groves
- Chuck Bednarik Award watchlist – Quentin Groves
- Ted Hendricks Award watchlist – Quentin Groves
- Manning Award watchlist – Brandon Cox

=== Pre-season All-SEC Team ===
- Coaches First Team, Defense – Quentin Groves (DE)
- Media Days First Team, Defense – Quentin Groves (DE)
- Coaches Second Team, Defense – Jonathan Wilhite (CB)
- Media Days Second Team, Offense – King Dunlap (OL)
- Media Days Second Team, Defense – Jonathan Wilhite (CB)
- Coaches Third Team, Offense – King Dunlap, Brad Lester (RB)
- Coaches Third Team, Defense – Josh Thompson (NT), Eric Brock (S), Patrick Lee (CB)

== Schedule ==
The 2007 Tigers schedule was ranked the 5th hardest in the country by Sports Illustrated and 6th hardest by ESPN. The road schedule with all four opponents finishing in the Top 25 in 2006 including the defending BCS champion Florida Gators, was ranked as the 2nd toughest.

Post-season, Auburn's schedule difficulty was ranked #23 by the NCAA and #35 by Jeff Sagarin. Seven teams from Auburn's regular season schedule qualified for post-season bowls, with four winning their respective bowl including Sugar Bowl winner Georgia and BCS National Champion LSU.

Date	Time	Opponent	Rank	Site	TV	Result	Attendance
September 1	6:45 pm	Kansas State*	No. 18	Jordan–Hare Stadium; Auburn, AL	ESPN	W 23–13	86,439
September 8	8:00 pm	South Florida*	No. 17	Jordan–Hare Stadium; Auburn, AL	ESPN2	L 23–26 ^{OT}	82,617
September 15	11:30 am	Mississippi State		Jordan–Hare Stadium; Auburn, AL	LFS	L 14–19	82,129
September 22	6:00 pm	New Mexico State*		Jordan–Hare Stadium; Auburn, AL	PPV	W 55–20	83,012
September 29	7:00 pm	at No. 4 Florida		Ben Hill Griffin Stadium; Gainesville, FL (rivalry)	ESPN	W 20–17	90,685
October 6	11:30 am	Vanderbilt		Jordan–Hare Stadium; Auburn, AL	LFS	W 35–7	82,657
October 13	6:45 pm	at Arkansas	No. 22	Donald W. Reynolds Razorback Stadium; Fayetteville, AR	ESPN	W 9–7	72,463
October 20	8:00 pm	at No. 4 LSU	No. 17	Tiger Stadium; Baton Rouge, LA (Tiger Bowl)	ESPN	L 24–30	92,630
October 27	5:00 pm	Ole Miss	No. 23	Jordan–Hare Stadium; Auburn, AL (rivalry)	PPV	W 17–3	87,451
November 3	1:30 pm	Tennessee Tech*^{†}	No. 19	Jordan–Hare Stadium; Auburn, AL		W 35–3	85,754
November 10	2:30 pm	at No. 10 Georgia	No. 17	Sanford Stadium; Athens, GA (Deep South's Oldest Rivalry)	CBS	L 20–45	92,746
November 24	7:00 pm	Alabama	No. 25	Jordan–Hare Stadium; Auburn, AL (Iron Bowl)	ESPN	W 17–10	87,451
December 31	7:30 pm	vs. No. 15 Clemson*	No. 23	Georgia Dome; Atlanta, GA (rivalry) (Chick-fil-A Bowl)	ESPN	W 23–20 ^{OT}	74,413
*Non-conference game; ^{†}Homecoming; Rankings from AP Poll released prior to the game; All times are in Central time

== Coaching staff ==
Name	Position	Years at AU*	Alma mater (Year)
Tommy Tuberville	Head coach	8	Southern Arkansas University (1976)
Al Borges	Offensive coordinator, Quarterbacks	3	California State University, Chico (1982)
Hugh Nall	Offensive line	8	University of Georgia (1983)
Eddie Gran	Running backs, Special teams	8	California Lutheran (1987)
Steve Ensminger	Tight ends	4	Louisiana State University (1982)
Greg Knox	Wide receivers, Recruiting Coordinator	8	Northeastern State (1986), Northeastern (1990)
Will Muschamp	Defensive coordinator, Secondary	1	University of Georgia (1994), Auburn University (1996)
Don Dunn	Defensive tackles	8	East Tennessee State (1976), Union College (1980)
Terry Price	Defensive ends	8	Texas A&M (1992)
James Willis	Linebackers	1	Auburn University (2003)

*Entering season

== Game summaries ==
=== Kansas State ===
	1	2	3	4	Total
Wildcats	3	0	10	0	13
#14 Tigers	0	6	3	14	23

Brandon Cox threw a three-yard touchdown pass to tight end Gabe McKenzie with 2:01 remaining in the fourth quarter, then Antonio Coleman returned a recovered fumble 34 yards 50 seconds later for another touchdown and Auburn defeated Kansas State in the season opener for both teams. The Tigers trailed 13–9 heading into the fourth quarter, as Auburn's running game was held to only 62 yards. Cox completed 17 passes in 30 attempts for 229 yards and the decisive touchdown pass. Freshman place-kicker Wes Byrum kicked field goals of 20, 39 and 31 yards in his college debut.

Auburn had won the only two previous meetings with Kansas State in 1978 and 1979, and continued that tradition with a tough win in the home opener against the Wildcats.

- SEC Defensive Lineman Of The Week: Quentin Groves

=== USF ===
	1	2	3	4	OT	Total
Bulls	14	0	0	6	6	26
#13 Tigers	3	14	0	3	3	23

This was Auburn's first game against the Big East's USF Bulls, and it was a memorable night for the Bulls. Quarterback Matt Grothe threw a 14-yard touchdown pass to receiver Jesse Hester in overtime to lead USF to a 26–23 upset win over Auburn. The Tigers committed five turnovers-three lost fumbles and two passes thrown for interceptions-as the Bulls won their first-ever game against a team from the Southeastern Conference.

USF led 14–3 after the first quarter, but Auburn scored two touchdowns in the second quarter on a four-yard run by freshman tailback Mario Fannin and a three-yard pass reception by Gabe McKenzie to take a 17–14 halftime lead. South Florida place kicker Delbert Alvarado, who had missed four field goal attempts in the second half, kicked an 18-yard field goal with less than a minute remaining in the fourth quarter to tie the game and force overtime.

- Lou Groza Star of the Week: Wes Byrum

=== Mississippi State ===
	1	2	3	4	Total
Bulldogs	10	3	0	6	19
Tigers	0	14	0	0	14

In a game that would see the Tigers turn the ball over five times, and their starting quarterback benched in favor of a true freshman, Auburn fell to the Bulldogs despite outgaining them by 110 yards. Mississippi State last won at Auburn in 1999 as Auburn leads the series at home 25–5 and 56–22–2 overall.

=== New Mexico State ===
	1	2	3	4	Total
Aggies	7	13	0	0	20
Tigers	14	7	14	20	55

The Aggies lost to the Tigers in the teams' only previous meeting in 1993.

- SEC Special Teams Player Of The Week: Josh Hebert & Patrick Tatum

=== Florida ===
	1	2	3	4	Total
Tigers	7	7	3	3	20
#4 Gators	0	0	3	14	17

Auburn made its first trip to The Swamp since 2002. Auburn's defeat of Florida was the Gators' only loss in their 2006 BCS Championship season, and the Tigers pulled an upset again in 2007 over then #3 ranked Gators. With the win, Auburn increased their lead in the overall series (42–38–2) and Tommy Tuberville coached Auburn teams now hold a 3–0 record versus Florida when the Gators are ranked in the Top 5.

Wes Byrum's game-winning field goal as time expired was named the ESPN Game-Changing Performance of the Week.

- SEC Defensive Player of the Week: Jerraud Powers
- SEC Special Teams Player of the Week: Wes Byrum
- Lou Groza Star of the Week: Wes Byrum

=== Vanderbilt ===
	1	2	3	4	Total
Commodores	0	0	0	7	7
Tigers	14	14	7	0	35

The Tigers scored touchdowns on their first three possessions of the game and led 28–0 at halftime while coasting to an easy 35–7 victory over the visiting Commodores. Sophomore running back Ben Tate led the Tigers with 96 rushing yards, while Brad Lester, seeing his first game action since the 2006 Iron Bowl victory over Alabama, scored two touchdowns and rushed for 77 yards. Quarterback Brandon Cox completed 14 of 17 passing attempts for 165 yards for the Tigers, who improved to 2–1 in conference play and 4–2 overall.

The Commodores rotated back onto Auburn's schedule for the first meeting since 2003. After the victory, Auburn's all-time record against Vanderbilt is now 20–19–1. While the win marked the Tigers first lead in the series in 113 years, Auburn has not lost to the Commodores since 1955 when they met in the Gator Bowl. Auburn wore all-white uniforms at home for this game and removed the traditional AU logo from their helmets to honor the 50th anniversary of the 1957 National Championship team. The win marked Tommy Tuberville's 100th career win.

=== Arkansas ===
	1	2	3	4	Total
#22 Tigers	3	0	0	6	9
Razorbacks	0	0	0	7	7

For the second time in three weeks, freshman kicker Wes Byrum kicked the winning field goal in the final minute of play as the 22nd-ranked Tigers defeated the Razorbacks 9–7. Byrum's three field goals accounted for all nine of Auburn's points as the Tigers won their fourth consecutive game and avenged a 27–10 loss to the Razorbacks in 2006 at Jordan–Hare Stadium. The Tigers' defense limited Arkansas running back Darren McFadden to 43 yards rushing.

Auburn scored the first six points of the game, as Wes Byrum kicked 22- and 38-yard field goals in the first and fourth quarter, but the Razorbacks went ahead with 1:36 remaining in the fourth quarter on an 11-yard touchdown pass from Casey Dick to Lucas Miller and a successful point after touchdown by Alex Tejada. Auburn returned the ensuing kickoff to their own 47 yard line. The go-ahead drive was highlighted by a 30-yard pass from senior quarterback Brandon Cox to wide receiver Robert Dunn. Byrum, who had missed field goal attempts in the third and fourth quarter, kicked the winning field goal with 21 seconds left in the game.

- SEC Defensive Player of the Week: Tray Blackmon
- Lou Groza Star of the Week: Wes Byrum

=== LSU ===
	1	2	3	4	Total
#18 Auburn Tigers	7	10	0	7	24
#5 LSU Tigers	7	0	6	17	30

In a game that went back and forth between both teams, LSU quarterback Matt Flynn completed a touchdown pass to Demetrius Byrd at the last second to give LSU a 30–24 win.

Auburn has scored only five wins in eighteen attempts at tough Tiger Stadium, the last coming in Tuberville's first year at Auburn (1999). The stakes were high, as this game was a key matchup for a berth in the SEC Championship Game. The loss brings the series to 19–21–1 in favor of LSU. LSU went on to win the BCS National Championship game finishing #1 in the polls.

=== Ole Miss ===
	1	2	3	4	Total
Rebels	0	3	0	0	3
#22 Tigers	7	0	3	7	17

Ole Miss has only beaten the Tigers in Auburn twice, in 1999 and in 2003; Auburn leads the series 24–8 after the 17–3 victory.

- SEC Defensive Lineman Of The Week: Antonio Coleman

=== Tennessee Tech ===
	1	2	3	4	Total
Golden Eagles	3	0	0	0	3
#16 Tigers	14	7	7	7	35

The Tennessee Tech Golden Eagles traveled to Auburn to meet the home-standing Tigers for the first time. Tech was greeted by Auburn's own golden eagle, Nova – War Eagle VII, who circled the field prior to the game in one of college football's most exciting traditions.

=== Georgia ===
#17 Auburn Tigers (7–3) at #10 Georgia Bulldogs (7–2)

Quarter	1	2	3	4	Total
Auburn	3	7	10	0	20
Georgia	10	7	14	14	45

at Sanford Stadium • Athens, Georgia

- Date: November 10
- Game time: 3:30 p.m. EDT
- Game weather: Sunny • 64 °F (18 °C) • Wind 5 miles per hour (8.0 km/h; 4.3 kn)
- Game attendance: 92,746
- Referee: Penn Wagers
- TV announcers (CBS): Verne Lundquist & Gary Danielson
- Box Score

Game information

Auburn

- Brandon Cox
  14/30, 133 Yds, TD, 4 INT
- Ben Tate
  13 Rush, 58 Yds, TD
- Cole Bennett
  2 Rec, 32 Yds

Georgia

- Matthew Stafford
  11/19, 237 Yds, 2 TD, INT
- Knowshon Moreno
  22 Rush, 101 Yds, 2 TD
- Sean Bailey
  4 Rec, 96 Yds, TD

AU traveled to Georgia for the 111th meeting of the Deep South's Oldest Rivalry. The Tigers suffered a 20+ loss for the second straight year but Auburn still leads the series in Athens 18–10 and has won 10 of the last 13 matchups in Sanford Stadium. The second consecutive loss by the Tigers continued a trend in the series where each team would win two years in a row followed by two consecutive losses – this behavior dates back to 1999–2001 when Auburn won three straight. Georgia finished the season ranked #2 in the AP Poll.

Scoring summary

Quarter	Time	Drive			Team	Scoring information	Score	
Quarter	Time	Plays	Yards	TOP	Team	Scoring information	AUB	UGA
1	11:28	10	26	3:22	Georgia	32-yard field goal by Brandon Coutu	0	3
1	4:46	12	68	6:42	Auburn	22-yard field goal by Wes Byrum	3	3
1	3:09	5	72	1:37	Georgia	Mohamed Massaquoi 58-yard touchdown reception from Matthew Stafford, Brandon Coutu kick good	3	10
2	10:54	11	68	4:52	Georgia	Sean Bailey 15-yard touchdown reception from Matthew Stafford, Brandon Coutu kick good	3	17
2	6:13	8	65	4:41	Auburn	Ben Tate 7-yard touchdown run, Wes Byrum kick good	10	17
3	12:19	4	27	1:42	Auburn	Mario Fannin 12-yard touchdown reception from Brandon Cox, Wes Byrum kick good	17	17
3	6:47	11	45	3:57	Auburn	33-yard field goal by Wes Byrum	20	17
3	5:00	4	68	1:47	Georgia	Knowshon Moreno 24-yard touchdown run, Brandon Coutu kick good	20	24
3	0:00	6	48	3:17	Georgia	Knowshon Moreno 3-yard touchdown run, Brandon Coutu kick good	20	31
4	12:11	3	65	1:27	Georgia	Brannan Coutherland 1-yard touchdown run, Brandon Coutu kick good	20	38
						Thomas Brown 1-yard touchdown run, Brandon Coutu kick good	20	45
"TOP" = time of possession. For other American football terms, see Glossary of American football.							20	45

=== Alabama ===
	1	2	3	4	Total
Crimson Tide	0	7	0	3	10
#25 Tigers	10	0	0	7	17

Auburn won the game 17–10, bringing the current winning streak to 6 (the longest in school history). Though this in-state rivalry known as the Iron Bowl is considered one of the most bitter and intense in all of sports with 72 matchups over the years, this was only the ninth meeting at Auburn's Jordan–Hare Stadium and the first meeting at JHS on Thanksgiving weekend.

- SEC Defensive Lineman Of The Week: Josh Thompson

== Rankings ==
Ranking movements Legend: ██ Increase in ranking ██ Decrease in ranking — = Not ranked RV = Received votes
	Week															
Poll	Pre	1	2	3	4	5	6	7	8	9	10	11	12	13	14	Final
AP	18	17	RV	—	—	RV	22	18	23	19	18	RV	25	23	22	15
Coaches Poll	14	13	RV	RV	RV	RV	25	19	23	16	17	RV	25	21	21	14
Harris	Not released				—	RV	25	19	23	18	18	RV	25	24	23	Not released
BCS	Not released							17	22	16	18	—	—	24	23	Not released

== Depth chart ==
Starters and backups.

Defense

FS
Aairon Savage
Josh Hebert
⋅

WLB	MLB	SLB
⋅	Merrill Johnson	⋅
Craig Stevens	Chris Evans	⋅
⋅	⋅	⋅

SS
Eric Brock
Zac Etheridge
Jonathan Vickers

CB
Patrick Lee
Walter McFadden
Zach Gilbert

DE	DT	DT	DE
Sen'Derrick Marks	Pat Sims	Josh Thompson	Quentin Groves
Michael Goggans	Mike Blanc	Pat Sims	Antonio Coleman
⋅	⋅	⋅	⋅

CB
Jonathan Wilhite
Jerraud Powers
⋅

Offense

WR
Rodgeriqus Smith
James Swinton
Tim Hawthorne

LT	LG	C	RG	RT
King Dunlap	Tyronne Green	Jason Bosley	Leon Hart	Andrew McCain
Oscar Gonzalez	Byron Isom	Mike Berry	Nathan Farrow	Antwoin Daniels
⋅	⋅	⋅	⋅	⋅

TE
Cole Bennett
Tommy Trott
Gabe McKenzie

WR
Montez Billings
Prechae Rodriguez
⋅

QB
Brandon Cox
Blake Field
⋅

RB
Brad Lester
Ben Tate
Mario Fannin

FB
Carl Stewart
Danny Perry
⋅

Special teams
PK Ross Gornall
PK Zach Kutch
P Ryan Shoemaker
KR Tristan Davis
PR Robert Dunn

== Post-season ==
	1	2	3	4	OT	Total
#15 Clemson Tigers	0	7	0	10	3	20
#22 Auburn Tigers	3	0	7	7	6	23

Auburn's 8-win regular season qualified a post-season bowl and the Tigers were selected by the Chick-fil-A Bowl to face the ACC's Clemson Tigers, with both teams' defenses being ranked in the top 10. Auburn changed their offense for this game, moving to new offensive coordinator Tony Franklin's spread offense in eight practices. Auburn won the game in overtime with a 7-yard touchdown run by quarterback Kodi Burns. The 23–20 victory in 2007 was the first Peach Bowl to require overtime and Auburn now has a 3–1 record in the bowl. This bowl appearance marked Auburn's eighth consecutive appearance; the second longest streak in school history behind the 9-year stretch from 1982 to 1990.

=== National awards ===
- Broyles Award Finalist – Will Muschamp (DC)

==== Freshman All-Americans ====
	Sporting News	Rivals.com	Scout.com	CollegeFootballNews.com
First Team	Lee Ziemba (OL); Ryan Shoemaker (P)	Lee Ziemba (OL); Ryan Shoemaker (P)	Lee Ziemba (OL)	Lee Ziemba (OL)
Second Team	Zac Etheridge (S)	Zac Etheridge (S)	Wes Byrum (K)	Ryan Pugh (OL); Ryan Shoemaker (P)
Honorable Mention	Wes Byrum (K); Craig Stevens (LB)		Ryan Pugh (OL); Chaz Ramsey (OL); Zac Etheridge (S)	Chaz Ramsey (OL)

=== Conference awards ===
- Associated Press All-SEC Team
  - First Team – Pat Sims (DT)
  - Second Team – Quentin Groves (DE), Ryan Shoemaker (P), Patrick Lee (CB)
- Coaches' All-SEC
  - First Team – Quentin Groves (DE)
  - Second Team – Ryan Shoemaker (P)
- Coaches' All-SEC Freshman Team – Ryan Pugh (OL), Chaz Ramsey (OL), Lee Ziemba (OL), Antoine Carter (DE), Zac Etheridge (S), Ryan Shoemaker (P)

=== Coaching changes ===
Following the close of the regular season, head coach Tommy Tuberville was offered a two-year contract extension that was verbally accepted on December 4, 2007. One week later, offensive coordinator Al Borges announced his resignation following a meeting late the previous week with Tuberville. On December 12, Auburn announced Tony Franklin, the offensive coordinator for the Troy Trojans, as Borges' replacement. With only 8 days of practice prior to the bowl, the new spread offense proved quite effective as Auburn posted 423 yards of offense (233 passing / 190 rushing), besting their season average in all offensive categories despite playing against the #6 defense in the nation.

Days following the Chick-fil-A Bowl, defensive coordinator Will Muschamp interviewed for and accepted the vacant defensive coordinator position with the Texas Longhorns. On January 17, 2008, Auburn named Pittsburgh's Paul Rhoads as the new defensive coordinator.
