= 2007 Ole Miss Rebels football team =

American college football season

2007 Ole Miss Rebels football
- Conference: Southeastern Conference
- Western Division
- Record: 3–9 (0–8 SEC)
- Head coach: Ed Orgeron (3rd season)
- Offensive coordinator: Dan Werner (2nd season)
- Offensive scheme: Spread
- Defensive coordinator: John Thompson (1st season)
- Base defense: Multiple
- Home stadium: Vaught–Hemingway Stadium

2007 Southeastern Conference football standings
	Conf.			Overall
Team	W		L	W		L
Eastern Division
No. 12 Tennessee xy	6	–	2	10	–	4
No. 2 Georgia x%	6	–	2	11	–	2
No. 13 Florida	5	–	3	9	–	4
South Carolina	3	–	5	6	–	6
Kentucky	3	–	5	8	–	5
Vanderbilt	2	–	6	5	–	7
Western Division
No. 1 LSU x$#	6	–	2	12	–	2
No. 15 Auburn	5	–	3	9	–	4
Arkansas	4	–	4	8	–	5
Mississippi State	4	–	4	8	–	5
Alabama	4	–	4	7	–	6
Ole Miss	0	–	8	3	–	9
Championship: LSU 21, Tennessee 14
# – BCS National Champion; $ – BCS representative as conference champion; % – BCS at-large representative; x – Division champion/co-champions; y – Championship game participant; Alabama had 5 victories vacated by the NCAA in 2010. As such, the official record for Alabama is 2–6 (1–4).; Rankings from AP Poll

The 2007 Ole Miss Rebels football team represented the University of Mississippi as a member of the Western Division of the Southeastern Conference (SEC) during the 2007 NCAA Division I FBS football season. Led by Ed Orgeron in his third and final season as head coach, the Rebels compiled an overall record of 3–9 with a mark of 0–8 in conference play, placing last out six teams in the SEC's Western Division. Ole Miss played home games at Vaught–Hemingway Stadium in Oxford, Mississippi.

== Schedule ==
Ole Miss opened the season against non-conference and longtime rival Memphis and played their home opener against Big 12 opponent Missouri. Ole Miss travelled to Vanderbilt, Georgia, Arkansas and Mississippi State. The Rebels hosted SEC opponents Florida, Alabama, Arkansas and LSU. The Rebels also played host to Northwestern State and hosted Louisiana Tech for their homecoming game.

Date	Time	Opponent	Site	TV	Result	Attendance
September 1	2:30 p.m.	at Memphis*	Liberty Bowl Memorial Stadium; Memphis, TN (rivalry)	CSS	W 23–21	45,457
September 8	5:00 p.m.	Missouri*	Vaught–Hemingway Stadium; Oxford, MS		L 25–38	50,897
September 15	6:00 p.m.	at Vanderbilt	Vanderbilt Stadium; Nashville, TN (rivalry)	PPV	L 17–31	34,180
September 22	11:30 a.m.	No. 3 Florida	Vaught–Hemingway Stadium; Oxford, MS	LFS	L 24–30	55,032
September 29	6:00 p.m.	at No. 15 Georgia	Sanford Stadium; Athens, GA		L 17–45	92,746
October 6	1:00 p.m.	Louisiana Tech*^{†}	Vaught–Hemingway Stadium; Oxford, MS		W 24–0	45,138
October 13	11:00 a.m.	Alabama	Vaught-Hemingway Stadium; Oxford, MS (rivalry)	LFS	L 24–27	59,791
October 20	1:00 p.m.	Arkansas	Vaught–Hemingway Stadium; Oxford, MS (rivalry)		L 8–44	52,671
October 27	5:00 p.m.	at No. 23 Auburn	Jordan-Hare Stadium; Auburn, AL (rivalry)	PPV	L 3–17	87,451
November 3	1:00 p.m.	Northwestern State*	Vaught–Hemingway Stadium; Oxford, MS		W 38–31	23,283
November 17	2:30 p.m.	No. 1 LSU	Vaught–Hemingway Stadium; Oxford, MS (rivalry)	CBS	L 24–41	61,118
November 23	11:30 a.m.	at Mississippi State	Davis Wade Stadium; Starkville, MS (Egg Bowl)	LFS	L 14–17	51,727
*Non-conference game; ^{†}Homecoming; Rankings from AP Poll released prior to the game; All times are in Central time
