= Colt David =

American football player (born 1985)

No. 6
- Position: Placekicker

Personal information
- Born: November 26, 1985 (age 40); Bedford, Texas, U.S.
- Listed height: 5 ft 10 in (1.78 m)
- Listed weight: 170 lb (77 kg)

Career information
- High school: Grapevine (Grapevine, Texas)
- College: LSU
- NFL draft: 2009: undrafted

Career history
- 2010: Montreal Alouettes

Awards and highlights
- Grey Cup champion (2010); BCS national champion (2007); 2× First-team All-SEC (2007, 2008)
- Stats at CFL.ca

Colt Justin David (born November 26, 1985) is an American former professional football placekicker who played one season with the Montreal Alouettes of the Canadian Football League (CFL). He played college football at Louisiana State University. He was a member of the 2007 LSU Tigers national championship football team and the 98th Grey Cup winning Montreal Alouettes.

== Early life ==
David was a three-year letterman at Grapevine High School in Grapevine, Texas, playing both football and soccer. He converted 27 of 36 field goal attempts during his prep career, with a long of 50 yards. He also played punter, averaging 43.7 yards per punt as a senior and setting a school record with an 81-yard punt.

== College career ==
David played for the LSU Tigers from 2005 to 2008. He was named first-team All-SEC in 2007 and 2008. He scored a school-record 369 points.

== Professional career ==
David was signed by the Montreal Alouettes of the CFL on June 11, 2010. He was named CFL Special Teams Player of the Week for week fifteen of the 2010 CFL season after going six for six on field goal attempts in his CFL debut in relief of an injured Damon Duval. The Alouettes won the 98th Grey Cup on November 28, 2010, defeating the Saskatchewan Roughriders by a score of 21 to 18.
