= 2007 South Carolina Gamecocks football team =

American college football season

2007 South Carolina Gamecocks football
- Conference: Southeastern Conference
- Eastern Division
- Record: 6–6 (3–5 SEC)
- Head coach: Steve Spurrier (3rd season)
- Offensive scheme: Fun and gun
- Defensive coordinator: Tyrone Nix (3rd season)
- Base defense: 4–3
- Home stadium: Williams-Brice Stadium

2007 Southeastern Conference football standings
	Conf.			Overall
Team	W		L	W		L
Eastern Division
No. 12 Tennessee xy	6	–	2	10	–	4
No. 2 Georgia x%	6	–	2	11	–	2
No. 13 Florida	5	–	3	9	–	4
South Carolina	3	–	5	6	–	6
Kentucky	3	–	5	8	–	5
Vanderbilt	2	–	6	5	–	7
Western Division
No. 1 LSU x$#	6	–	2	12	–	2
No. 15 Auburn	5	–	3	9	–	4
Arkansas	4	–	4	8	–	5
Mississippi State	4	–	4	8	–	5
Alabama	4	–	4	7	–	6
Ole Miss	0	–	8	3	–	9
Championship: LSU 21, Tennessee 14
# – BCS National Champion; $ – BCS representative as conference champion; % – BCS at-large representative; x – Division champion/co-champions; y – Championship game participant; Alabama had 5 victories vacated by the NCAA in 2010. As such, the official record for Alabama is 2–6 (1–4).; Rankings from AP Poll

The 2007 South Carolina Gamecocks football team represented the University of South Carolina in the Southeastern Conference during the 2007 NCAA Division I FBS football season. The Gamecocks were led by Steve Spurrier in his third season as USC head coach and played their home games in Williams-Brice Stadium in Columbia, South Carolina. South Carolina started the season 6–1 and ranked No. 6 in the country, their highest ranking since 1984. However, they lost their last five games. The team was bowl eligible at 6–6 but was not selected for a bowl game.

== Schedule ==
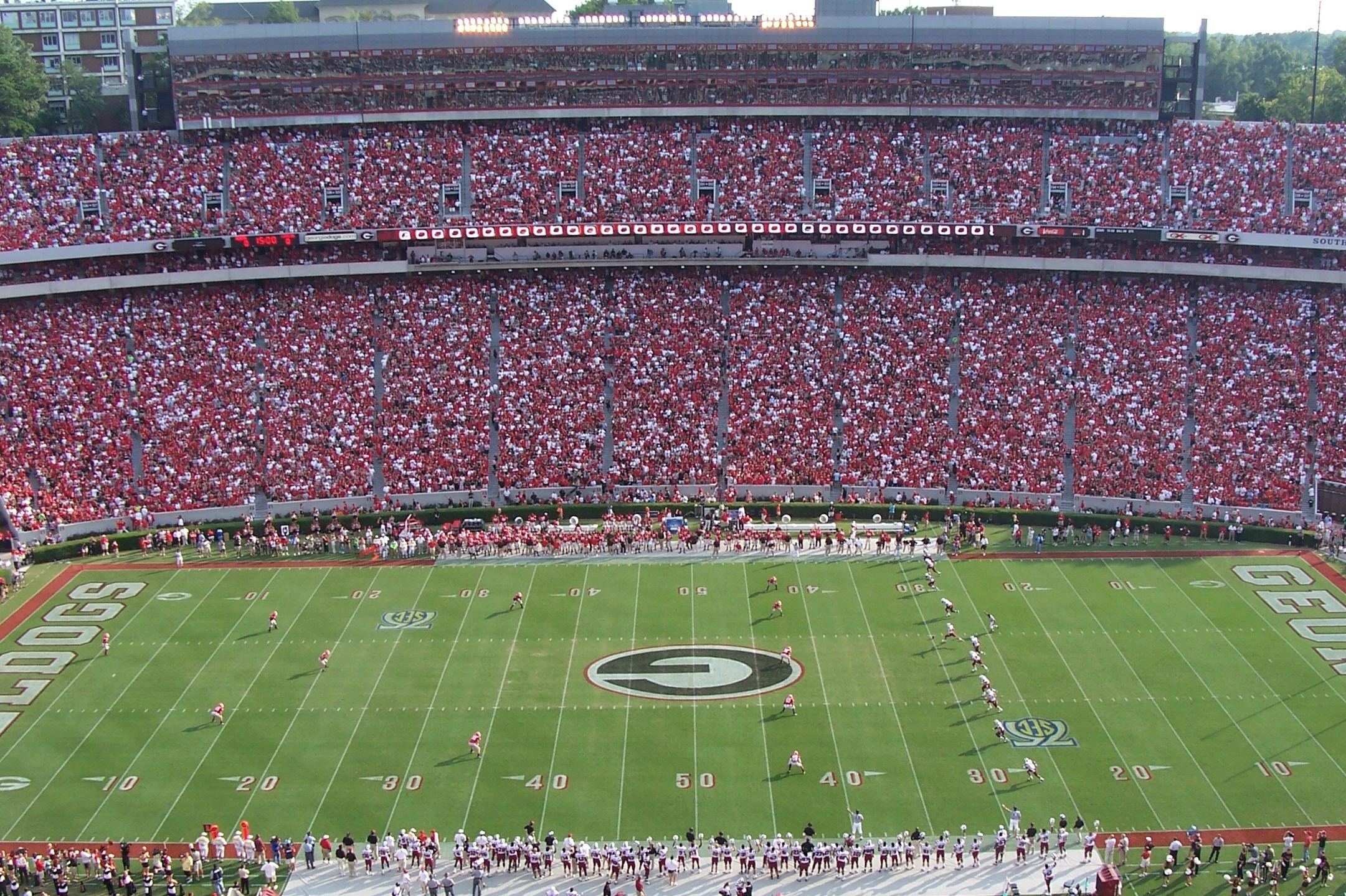
Georgia vs South Carolina, Sanford Stadium, September 8, 2007

Date	Time	Opponent	Rank	Site	TV	Result	Attendance	Source
September 1	7:05 pm	Louisiana–Lafayette*		Williams–Brice Stadium; Columbia, SC	PPV	W 28–14	78,234	
September 8	5:45 pm	No. 11 Georgia		Sanford Stadium; Athens, GA (rivalry)	ESPN2	W 16–12	92,746	
September 15	7:00 pm	South Carolina State*	No. 17	Williams–Brice Stadium; Columbia, SC	PPV	W 38–3	73,095	
September 22	3:30 pm	at No. 2 LSU	No. 12	Tiger Stadium; Baton Rouge, Louisiana	CBS	L 16–28	92,530	
September 29	12:30 pm	Mississippi State	No. 16	Williams–Brice Stadium; Columbia, SC	LFS	W 38–21	78,883	
October 4	7:45 pm	No. 8 Kentucky	No. 11	Williams–Brice Stadium; Columbia, SC	ESPN	W 38–23	76,220	
October 13	3:30 pm	at North Carolina*	No. 7	Kenan Memorial Stadium; Chapel Hill, NC (rivalry)	ABC	W 21–15	61,000	
October 20	12:30 pm	Vanderbilt^{†}	No. 6	Williams–Brice Stadium; Columbia, SC	PPV	L 6–17	79,212	
October 27	7:45 pm	at Tennessee	No. 15	Neyland Stadium; Knoxville, TN (rivalry)	ESPN	L 24–27 ^{OT}	105,962	
November 3	8:00 pm	at Arkansas	No. 23	Donald W. Reynolds Razorback Stadium; Fayetteville, AR	ESPN2	L 36–48	70,742	
November 10	7:45 pm	No. 17 Florida		Williams–Brice Stadium; Columbia, SC	ESPN	L 31–51	81,215	
November 24	7:00 pm	No. 21 Clemson*		Williams-Brice Stadium; Columbia, SC (rivalry)	ESPN2	L 21–23	82,410	
*Non-conference game; ^{†}Homecoming; Rankings from AP Poll released prior to the game; All times are in Eastern time
