= 2007 Vanderbilt Commodores football team =

American college football season

2007 Vanderbilt Commodores football
- Conference: Southeastern Conference
- Eastern Division
- Record: 5–7 (2–6 SEC)
- Head coach: Bobby Johnson (6th season)
- Offensive coordinator: Ted Cain (6th season)
- Offensive scheme: Multiple
- Defensive coordinator: Bruce Fowler (6th season)
- Base defense: 4–3
- Captain: 3: Jonathan Goff; Chris Williams; Theo Horrocks
- Home stadium: Vanderbilt Stadium

2007 Southeastern Conference football standings
	Conf.			Overall
Team	W		L	W		L
Eastern Division
No. 12 Tennessee xy	6	–	2	10	–	4
No. 2 Georgia x%	6	–	2	11	–	2
No. 13 Florida	5	–	3	9	–	4
South Carolina	3	–	5	6	–	6
Kentucky	3	–	5	8	–	5
Vanderbilt	2	–	6	5	–	7
Western Division
No. 1 LSU x$#	6	–	2	12	–	2
No. 15 Auburn	5	–	3	9	–	4
Arkansas	4	–	4	8	–	5
Mississippi State	4	–	4	8	–	5
Alabama	4	–	4	7	–	6
Ole Miss	0	–	8	3	–	9
Championship: LSU 21, Tennessee 14
# – BCS National Champion; $ – BCS representative as conference champion; % – BCS at-large representative; x – Division champion/co-champions; y – Championship game participant; Alabama had 5 victories vacated by the NCAA in 2010. As such, the official record for Alabama is 2–6 (1–4).; Rankings from AP Poll

The 2007 Vanderbilt Commodores football team represented Vanderbilt University during the 2007 NCAA Division I FBS football season. The team's head coach was Bobby Johnson, who served his sixth year as the Commodores' head coach. Members of the Southeastern Conference (SEC), the Commodores played their home games at Vanderbilt Stadium at Dudley Field in Nashville, Tennessee. In 2007, Vanderbilt went 5–7 with a record of 2–6 in the SEC.

== Schedule ==
Date	Time	Opponent	Site	TV	Result	Attendance
September 1	6:00 p.m.	Richmond*	Vanderbilt Stadium; Nashville, TN		W 41–17	32,215
September 8	11:30 a.m.	Alabama	Vanderbilt Stadium; Nashville, TN	LFS	L 10–24	39,773
September 15	6:00 p.m.	Ole Miss	Vanderbilt Stadium; Nashville, TN (rivalry)	PPV	W 31–17	34,180
September 29	6:00 p.m.	Eastern Michigan*	Vanderbilt Stadium; Nashville, TN		W 30–7	37,220
October 6	11:30 a.m.	at Auburn	Jordan–Hare Stadium; Auburn, AL	LFS	L 7–35	82,657
October 13	5:00 p.m.	No. 24 Georgia^{†}	Vanderbilt Stadium; Nashville, TN (rivalry)	ESPN2	L 17–20	39,773
October 20	11:30 a.m.	at No. 6 South Carolina	Williams-Brice Stadium; Columbia, SC	PPV	W 17–6	79,212
October 27	1:00 p.m.	Miami (OH)*	Vanderbilt Stadium; Nashville, TN		W 24–13	26,450
November 3	11:30 a.m.	at No. 18 Florida	Ben Hill Griffin Stadium; Gainesville, FL	LFS	L 22–49	90,222
November 10	1:00 p.m.	No. 25 Kentucky	Vanderbilt Stadium; Nashville, TN (rivalry)	PPV	L 20–27	39,773
November 17	1:00 p.m.	at No. 19 Tennessee	Neyland Stadium; Knoxville, TN (rivalry)	PPV	L 24–25	105,077
November 24	1:00 p.m.	Wake Forest*	Vanderbilt Stadium; Nashville, TN		L 17–31	27,650
*Non-conference game; ^{†}Homecoming; Rankings from AP Poll released prior to the game; All times are in Central time
