= Al Borges =

American football coach (born 1955)

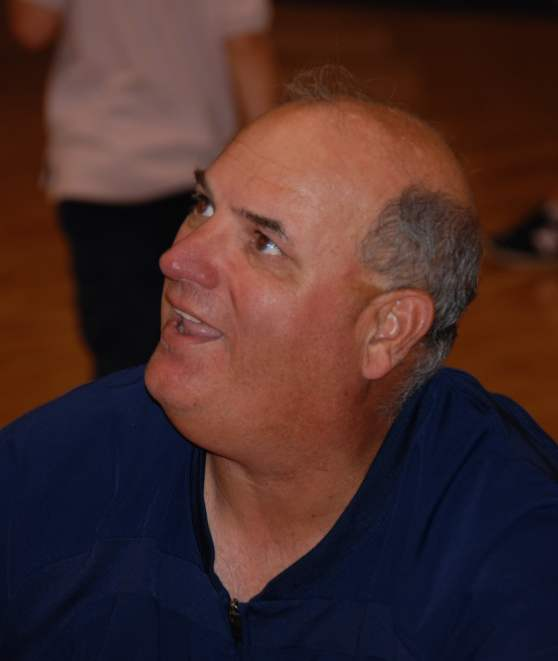
- Borges at Auburn Fan Day in 2007

Biographical details
- Born: October 8, 1955 (age 71); Salinas, California, U.S.
- Education: California State University, Chico

Coaching career (HC unless noted)
- 1975–1978: Salinas HS (CA) (assistant)
- 1979–1980: Chico Pleasant Valley HS (CA) (assistant)
- 1981: Salinas HS (CA) (assistant)
- 1982: California (assistant)
- 1983–1984: Diablo Valley (TE/WR)
- 1985: Diablo Valley (OC/WR)
- 1986–1992: Portland State (OC/QB)
- 1993–1994: Boise State (OC/QB)
- 1995: Oregon (OC/QB)
- 1996–2000: UCLA (OC/QB)
- 2001: California (OC/QB)
- 2002–2003: Indiana (OC/QB)
- 2004–2007: Auburn (OC/QB)
- 2009–2010: San Diego State (OC/QB)
- 2011–2013: Michigan (OC/QB)
- 2015–2016: San Jose State (OC/QB)
- 2017: Auburn (offensive analyst)
- 2018: UTSA (OC/QB)

Alan Anthony Borges (born October 8, 1955) is an American football coach. Borges is known for quarterback development having mentored Cade McNown and Jason Campbell, both first round NFL draft picks. Borges has been described as "one of the best offensive coordinators I've ever seen," by former Auburn head coach Pat Dye.

== Coaching career ==
=== Early career ===
Borges began his coaching career as an assistant coach at Salinas High School from 1975 to 1978, followed by a stint as an assistant at Pleasant Valley High School from 1979 to 1980. He earned a Bachelor of Arts degree in 1981 from California State University, Chico. Borges began his college coaching career at California as a part-time assistant in 1982 and 1983. He then moved on to his first full-time collegiate job at Diablo Valley College from 1983 to 1985. He split time with Diablo for two years in 1984 and 1985 as a defensive assistant with the USFL's Oakland Invaders.

From 1986 to 1992 he was the offensive coordinator for Division II Portland State University where he coached three All-American quarterbacks. In 1993, he moved up to then Division I-AA Boise State University where his offense reached the Division I-AA championship game in 1994 and was seen trying to take down the goal posts after Boise State defeated its rival University of Idaho. In a single season as offensive coordinator at Oregon in 1995, his team led the Pac-10 in passing offense with 263.8 yards per game. The Ducks also averaged 406.3 yards and 29.1 points per game. His quarterback that season, Tony Graziani, led the Pac-10 in both total offense and passing.

=== UCLA ===
Borges was the offensive coordinator for five years (1996–2000) at UCLA under head coach Bob Toledo. Over that five-year period, UCLA averaged 31.9 points a game as well as reaching season averages over 40 points per game in 1997 (40.7 ppg) and 1998 (40.5 ppg). He is also credited with developing Cade McNown from an average quarterback into a first-team AP All-American and first round NFL Draft pick and personally considers McNown his biggest turnaround.

=== California and Indiana ===
In January 2001, Borges left UCLA for a $50,000 raise and two-year contract for the same position at California. After a losing season in which the entire California staff was replaced, Borges accepted the offensive coordinator position at Indiana where he coached for two seasons until Auburn head coach Tommy Tuberville called in early 2004.

=== Auburn ===
Borges joined the Auburn staff in 2004. Auburn went 41-9 in the four seasons Borges was the offensive coordinator. Auburn was the only Southeastern Conference (SEC) team to finish ranked in the top 15 each of those seasons. Borges is credited with much of the success of the 2004 Auburn Tigers football team which recorded a perfect 13-0 season under his "West Coast Offense" scheme. Borges resigned from Auburn December 10, 2007, after a steady decline in the team's offensive production, before the team's appearance in the New Year's Eve Chick-fil-A Bowl.

=== San Diego State ===
On December 24, 2008, Brady Hoke (new head coach at San Diego State) hired Borges as offensive coordinator for the Aztecs.

Borges worked as the offensive coordinator at San Diego State for two years, and helped lead the team to a 9-4 record in 2010, marking the Aztec's first nine or more win season since 1977. Borges' offense averaged 35 points per game in 2010.

In 2009, Borges was a finalist to be the head coach at Portland State.

=== Michigan ===
On January 11, 2011, Brady Hoke, the new head coach at University of Michigan, hired Borges for the same position that he had held under Hoke at San Diego State.

Borges had quick offensive success with the Michigan Wolverines football team in 2011 and helped lead the team to an 11-2 record, putting Michigan in the 2012 Sugar Bowl, Michigan's first BCS bowl game since the 2006 season.

In 2012, Michigan lost early in the season to Alabama (41-14) and Notre Dame (13-6). Quarterback Denard Robinson threw four interceptions and was blamed for the Notre Dame loss. Robinson was injured in the third loss of the season against Nebraska, and backup quarterback Russell Bellomy performed poorly. Borges was criticized for not preparing then wide receiver and third-string quarterback Devin Gardner. Michigan went on to win their next three games before falling to Ohio State 26-21. Borges was criticized for poor play calling in the second half, in which Michigan failed to cross midfield.

In 2013, Michigan won close games against Akron (28-24) and UConn (24-21) and lost in four overtimes to Penn State. Borges and Michigan's offensive line were criticized, as starting tailback Fitzgerald Toussaint gained only 27 yards on 27 carries against Penn State. The following week Michigan had an offensive breakout game against Indiana, winning 63-47, with Jeremy Gallon having a record setting day. However, Michigan then had one of the worst statistical offensive performances in Michigan football history, losing to Michigan State 29-6 with -46 yards rushing in the game. The next week, Michigan again accumulated negative rushing yardage and lost to Nebraska 17-13. The loss was particularly troubling because Nebraska had one of the worst statistical defenses in college football. The team's offensive troubles continued through the second half of the season, leading to heightened criticism of Borges. In the final game of the regular season, Michigan regained its offensive rhythm and lost a close game to Ohio State, 42-41. Michigan played Kansas State in the Buffalo Wild Wings Bowl without starting quarterback Devin Gardner, who broke his toe against Ohio State in the second half. Backup quarterback Shane Morris played a solid game for a true freshman, but the offense still struggled to get things going. Michigan fell to Kansas State, 31-14. On January 8, 2014, Brady Hoke announced that Borges would not be retained for the 2014 season.

=== San Jose State ===
On February 5, 2015, San Jose State University announced that Borges was hired as offensive coordinator and quarterbacks coach under head coach Ron Caragher.

=== UTSA ===
On January 19, 2018, the University of Texas at San Antonio announced that Borges was hired as offensive coordinator and quarterbacks coach under head coach Frank Wilson. Borges’ offense finished the season ranked 129th out of 130 teams in major college football in scoring, managing just 14.2 points per game. Their rushing offense ranked 128th, and were 119th nationally throwing the ball. He was released at the end of the season.

== Awards and honors ==
- Rivals.com Offensive Coordinator of the Year, 2005
- Finalist - Frank Broyles Assistant Coach of the Year Award, 1997 and 1998
- Football Coach Quarterly's Offensive Coordinator of the Year, 1997.

== Instruction ==
Borges and his brother Keith, an assistant with him at California in 2001, collaborated on a book titled Coaching the West Coast Quarterback (ISBN 1-58518-341-5) as well as a series of instructional videos by the same name. Borges also contributed a chapter on strategy using the I formation for the American Football Coaches Association-published book, Football Offenses & Plays (ISBN 0-7360-6261-0) published in 2006.

== Personal life ==
Borges is married to the former Susan Malnick. Susan served as a paralegal for over 25 years. Borges is the son of Josephine and Gordon Borges and is one of seven children (John, Leslie, Teresa, Toni, Keith, and Cathy).
