= Tremaine Johnson =

American gridiron football player (born 1985)

No. 91
- Position: Defensive tackle

Personal information
- Born: September 26, 1985 (age 41); Houston, Texas, U.S.
- Listed height: 6 ft 2 in (1.88 m)
- Listed weight: 290 lb (132 kg)

Career information
- High school: Galena Park (TX)
- College: LSU
- NFL draft: 2009: undrafted

Career history
- Minnesota Vikings (2009–2011)*; Georgia Force (2012)*; Montreal Alouettes (2012); Tampa Bay Storm (2013)
- * Offseason or practice squad member only

Awards and highlights
- BCS national champion (2008)

Career AFL statistics
- Tackles: 10.5
- Interceptions: 1
- Stats at ArenaFan.com
- Stats at Pro Football Reference
- Stats at CFL.ca (archive)

Tremaine Weston Johnson (born September 26, 1985) is an American former gridiron football defensive tackle who played in the National Football League (NFL) and Canadian Football League (CFL). He was signed as an undrafted free agent by the Minnesota Vikings of the NFL in 2009. Johnson played college football at LSU and won a National Championship there.
