= 2007 Chick-fil-A Bowl =

American college football game

- 40th Peach Bowl
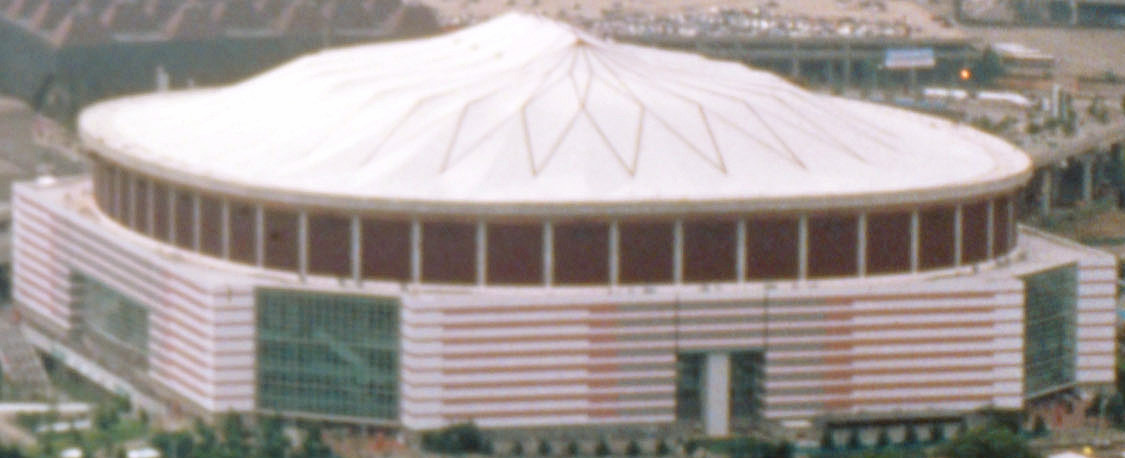
- The Georgia Dome in Atlanta, Georgia, hosted the Chick-fil-A Bowl.
Clemson Tigers	Auburn Tigers
(9–3)	(8–4)
ACC	SEC
20	23
Head coach: Tommy Bowden	Head coach: Tommy Tuberville
AP / Coaches / BCS; 15 / 16 / 15	AP / Coaches / BCS; 22 / 21 / 23
	1	2	3	4	OT	Total
Clemson	0	7	0	10	3	20
Auburn	3	0	7	7	6	23
- Date: December 31, 2007
- Season: 2007
- Stadium: Georgia Dome
- Location: Atlanta, Georgia
- MVP: Offensive: Clemson RB C. J. Spiller; Defensive: Auburn DT Pat Sims
- Favorite: Clemson by 2½
- Referee: Jack Wood (Pac-10)
- Halftime show: Auburn University Marching Band; Clemson University Tiger Band
- Attendance: 74,413
- Payout: US$2,825,000 per team

United States TV coverage
- Network: ESPN
- Announcers: Brad Nessler, Bob Griese, Paul Maguire, and Bonnie Bernstein

The 2007 Chick-fil-A Bowl was a college football bowl game between the Clemson Tigers and the Auburn Tigers played in Atlanta, Georgia on December 31, 2007. With sponsorship from Chick-fil-A, it was the 40th edition of the game known throughout most of its history as the Peach Bowl. Clemson University represented the Atlantic Coast Conference (ACC) and Auburn University represented the Southeastern Conference (SEC) in the competition. The game was the final competition of the 2007 football season for each team. In exchange for the right to pick the first ACC team after the Bowl Championship Series selections, bowl representatives paid $3.25 million to the ACC, while the SEC, whose fifth team was selected, received $2.4 million. The combined $5.65 million payout is the seventh-largest among all college football bowl games, and the fourth-largest non-BCS bowl game payout.

== Selection process ==
Beginning with the 2006 game, the Chick-fil-A Bowl had purchased the right to select the highest-ranked Atlantic Coast Conference team after representatives from the Bowl Championship Series made their selection. According to the official selection rules still used today, the team chosen to represent the ACC must be within one conference victory of the remaining, highest-ranked conference team or be ranked more than five spaces ahead of the ACC team with the best Conference record available in the final BCS Standings.

In choosing the SEC opponent, the Chick-fil-A Bowl selection committee had the right to select the first SEC school after the Bowl Championship Series, Cotton Bowl Classic, Capital One Bowl, and Outback Bowl made their selections. Just as in the ACC, the selection committee could not select an SEC team with two fewer losses than the highest available team. The bowl earned the right to select these teams via its multimillion-dollar payout system, which guarantees a certain amount of money to the participating conferences. Prior to 2006, the Chick-fil-A Bowl (then known as the Peach Bowl) matched the No. 5 team in the SEC versus the No. 3 team in the ACC. After the bowl increased its payout to $2.8 million per squad, it then was given the second pick from the ACC, with the Gator Bowl dropping to third.

Leeman Bennett, the former head coach of the Atlanta Falcons and Tampa Bay Buccaneers, served as chairman of the selection committee, which had the task of picking the best teams from those made available by the selection criteria set by the two conferences. The committee would have approximately one month to select the two teams that would attract the most people to the game and generate the largest possible television audience. Supervising the selection committee was the Chick-fil-A Bowl Executive Committee, which consisted of representatives from various Atlanta businesses and the Chick-fil-A corporation.

== Pre-game buildup ==
On December 2, 2007, Chick-fil-A Bowl representatives selected Clemson to represent the ACC in the 2007 Chick-fil-A Bowl. A few hours later, Auburn was selected as the second half of the matchup. Two days after the selections were announced, the game was declared sold out, the 11th consecutive sellout in the combined history of the Peach and Chick-fil-A Bowls. Clemson was allocated 17,500 tickets for distribution and Auburn was allocated 15,700 Casinos and betting organizations favor Clemson by 2½-3 points when setting their point spread.

=== Defensive matchups ===
Both defenses rank in the top ten, nationally, in both total defense and scoring defense.

Heading into the game, Auburn was ranked sixth in scoring defense, allowing an average of just 16.7 points per game, and eighth in total defense, giving up only 298.33 yards per game. Clemson was ranked sixth in total defense, giving up only 297.08 yards per game, and tenth in scoring defense, allowing an average of just 18.3 points per game.

== Television coverage ==
ESPN broadcast the game for the 12th straight year. The broadcast featured Brad Nessler and Bob Griese as announcers for the game. Following the game, ESPN broadcast a New Year's Eve special, New Year No Limits, which featured action sports athletes in record-setting attempts.

The preview show, "The 2007 Chick-fil-A Bowl Preview Show, presented by Russell Athletic" aired on ESPN2, ESPNU, and ESPN Classic, and was produced by Seals Communications Corporation in Atlanta. It was hosted by Lee Corso and Erin Andrews, along with reporters David Hamilton and Nikky Williams.

== AT&T "Kick for a Million" contest ==
During halftime, Christopher Stewart of Corryton, TN was the winner of a national drawing for the AT&T "Kick for a Million" contest. Christopher elected to attempt a 30-yard field goal for a prize of $100,000. Christopher would miss the kick to the right by inches, but still came away with a cash prize of $5,000.

== Final statistics ==
Statistical comparison
	Clemson	Auburn
1st downs	12	24
Total yards	293	423
Passing yards	117	233
Rushing yards	189	190
Penalties	1–5	5–40
3rd down conversions	5–19	7–19
4th down conversions	2–2	1–2
Turnovers	0	1
Time of possession	29:14	30:46

== See also ==
- 2007 NCAA Division I FBS football rankings
- Auburn–Clemson football rivalry
