= Marlon Favorite =

American football player (born 1986)

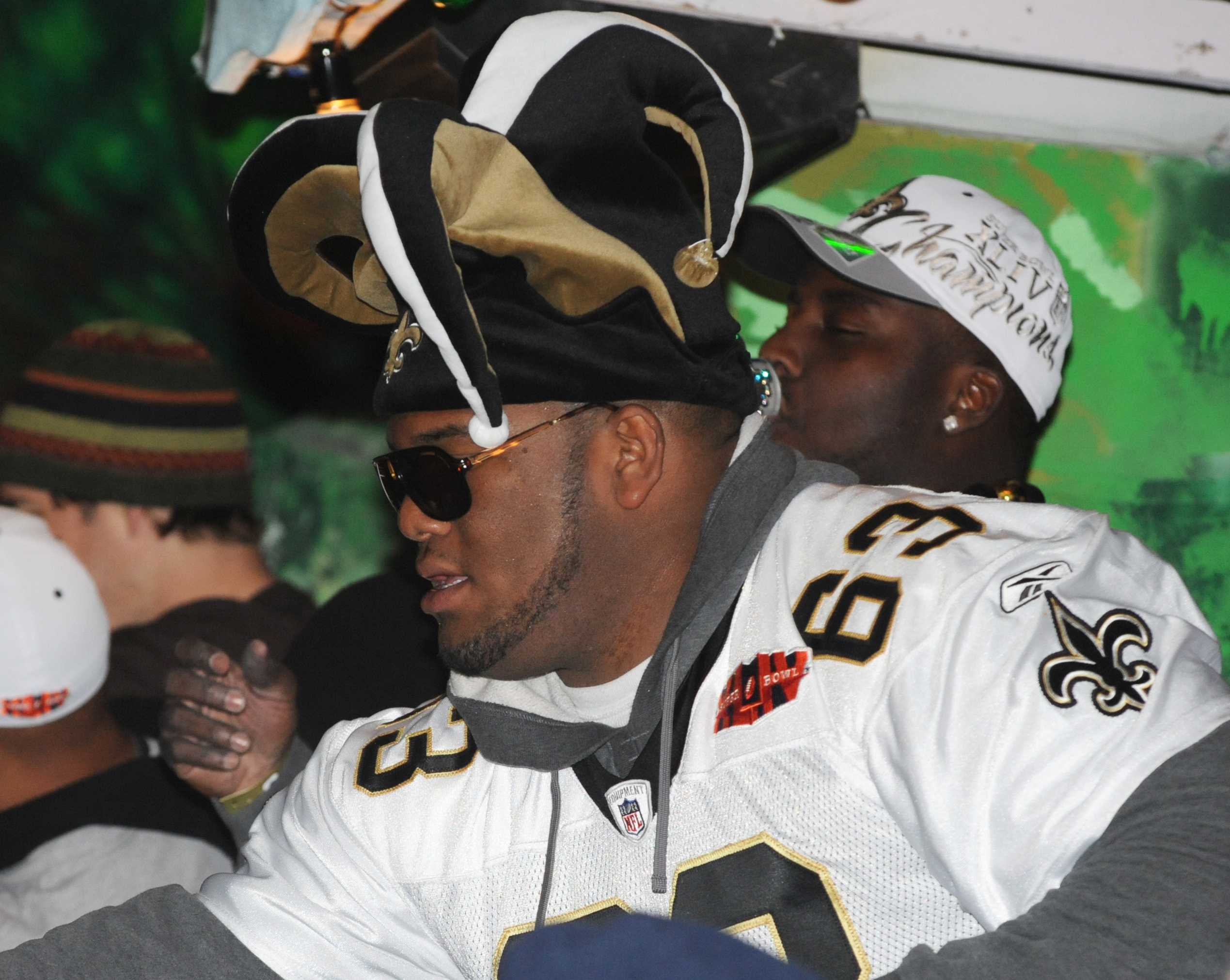
- Favorite at the 2010 Saints Super Bowl XLIV victory parade

No. 64, 99, 98
- Position: Defensive tackle

Personal information
- Born: June 22, 1986 (age 40); Gretna, Louisiana, U.S.
- Listed height: 6 ft 1 in (1.85 m)
- Listed weight: 317 lb (144 kg)

Career information
- High school: Archbishop Shaw (Marrero, Louisiana)
- College: Louisiana State
- NFL draft: 2009: undrafted

Career history
- Carolina Panthers (2009)*; St. Louis Rams (2009)*; Kansas City Chiefs (2009)*; Seattle Seahawks (2009)*; New Orleans Saints (2009)*; Buffalo Bills (2010)*; Indianapolis Colts (2010)*; Hartford Colonials (2010); New England Patriots (2010–2011)*; Philadelphia Eagles (2011)*; St. Louis Rams (2011)*; New Orleans VooDoo (2012–2014); Washington Redskins (2012)*; Sacramento Mountain Lions (2012)
- * Offseason or practice squad member only

Awards and highlights
- Super Bowl champion (XLIV); BCS national champion (2007)

Career AFL statistics
- Total tackles: 51
- Sacks: 14.5
- Forced fumbles: 3
- Fumble recoveries: 2
- Stats at ArenaFan.com
- Stats at Pro Football Reference

Marlon Dominique Favorite (born June 22, 1986) is an American former football defensive tackle. He was signed by the Carolina Panthers as an undrafted free agent in 2009. He played college football at Louisiana State University (LSU).

Favorite was also a member of the Kansas City Chiefs, Seattle Seahawks, New Orleans Saints, Buffalo Bills, Indianapolis Colts, Hartford Colonials, New England Patriots, Philadelphia Eagles, St. Louis Rams, Washington Redskins, and the AFL's New Orleans VooDoo.

== Early life ==
Favorite attended both Archbishop Shaw High School in Marrero, Louisiana and West Jefferson High School in Harvey, Louisiana, where he played football as a defensive tackle. In 2002, he had 105 tackles (35 for a loss) and 20 sacks. In 2003, as a senior, Favorite was a first-team Division 5A all-state selection after recording 115 tackles and nine sacks, and played in the U.S. Army All-American Bowl. The USA Today named him a first-team All-American, and ESPN.com rated him as their top defensive tackle prospect.

== College career ==
Following high school, Favorite attended Louisiana State University, where he redshirted in 2004. As a freshman in 2005, he played in three games a reserve, making two tackles. He played in 13 games in 2006, making four starts, while recording 18 tackles (4 for a loss), and two sacks. In 2007, as a junior, Favorite made six starts in 11 games played, finishing with 28 tackles. As a senior, Favorite played in 13 games, making seven starts, and recorded 28 tackles (3.5 for a loss) and two sacks.

== Professional career ==
=== Carolina Panthers ===
Favorite was signed by the Carolina Panthers as an undrafted free agent following the 2009 NFL draft. He was waived by the Panthers during final cuts on September 5, 2009.

=== St. Louis Rams ===
The St. Louis Rams signed Favorite to their practice squad on September 30, 2009. He was released by the Rams on October 8, 2009.

=== Kansas City Chiefs ===
Favorite was signed to the practice squad of the Kansas City Chiefs on October 21, 2009. He was released December 2, 2009.

=== Seattle Seahawks ===
The Seattle Seahawks signed Favorite to their practice squad on December 10, 2009, where he stayed through the remainder of the regular season.

=== New Orleans Saints ===
Favorite was signed by the New Orleans Saints to their practice squad during the playoffs on January 20, 2010. He remained with the Saints through their win in Super Bowl XLIV.

=== Buffalo Bills ===
The Buffalo Bills signed Favorite on March 2, 2010. He was waived on May 11, 2010.

=== Indianapolis Colts ===
Favorite was signed by the Indianapolis Colts on May 20, 2010. He was released during final cuts on September 3, 2010.

=== Hartford Colonials ===
The Hartford Colonials of the United Football League signed Favorite on October 19, 2010. He remained with the Colonials through the end of the 2010 UFL season.

=== New England Patriots ===
The New England Patriots signed Favorite to their practice squad during the playoffs on January 4, 2010.

He was re-signed to a futures contract on January 18, 2011. He was waived on August 5.

=== Philadelphia Eagles ===
On August 8, Favorite signed with the Philadelphia Eagles. He was waived on August 26.

=== St. Louis Rams (second stint) ===
The Rams re-signed Favorite on August 31, 2011. He was waived during final cuts on September 3.

=== New Orleans VooDoo ===
On October 21, 2011, Favorite signed with the New Orleans VooDoo of the Arena Football League. During the course of 3 seasons for the VooDoo, Favorite becomes the franchise's all-time leader in career sacks with 13.5, while also recording 73.5 tackles. Favorite retired from football on February 9, 2015.

=== Washington Redskins ===
On August 16, 2012, Favorite signed with the Washington Redskins. He was released on August 31, 2012, for final cuts before the start of the 2012 season.
