= Demetrius Byrd =

American football player (born 1986)

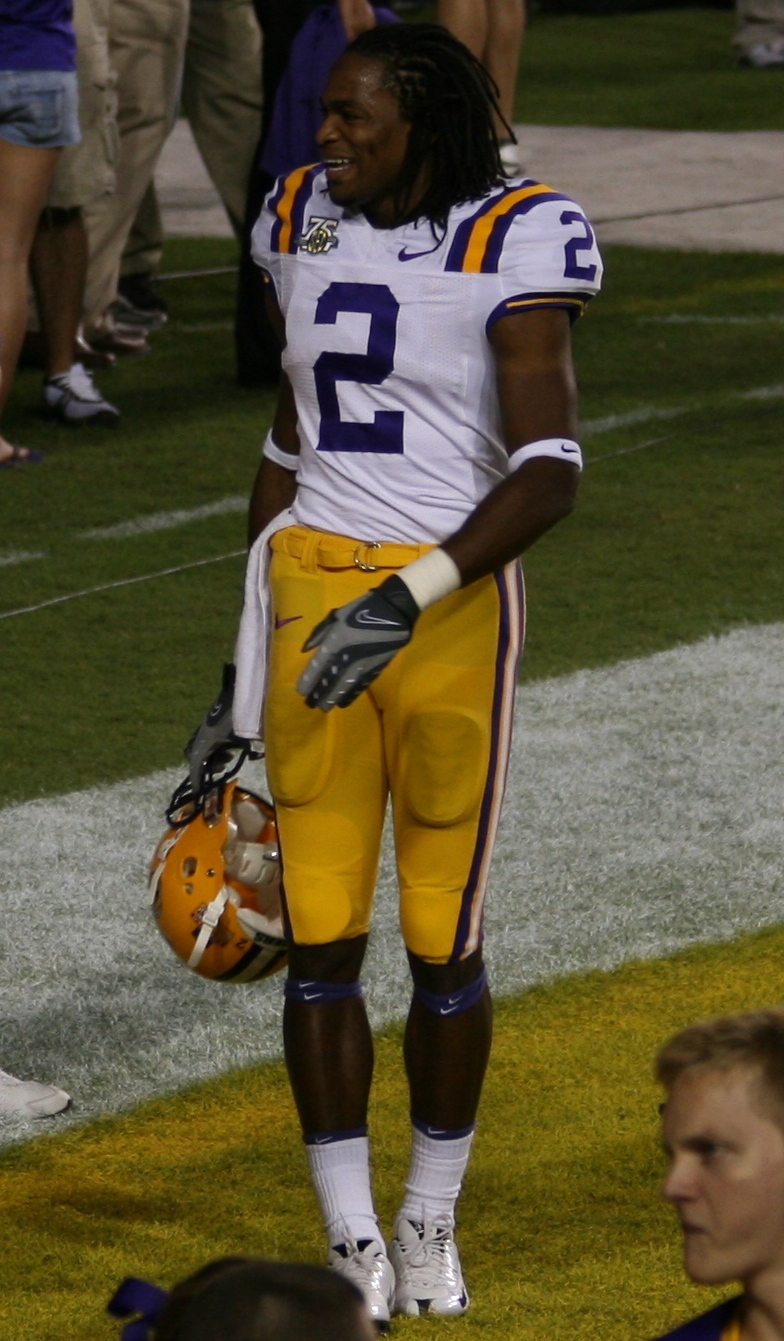
- Byrd with the LSU Tigers in 2007

No. 82
- Position: Wide receiver

Personal information
- Born: June 30, 1986 (age 40); Miami, Florida, U.S.
- Listed height: 6 ft 3 in (1.91 m)
- Listed weight: 200 lb (91 kg)

Career information
- High school: Miami Central (West Little River, Florida)
- College: LSU
- NFL draft: 2009: 7th round, 224th overall pick

Career history
- San Diego Chargers (2009)

Awards and highlights
- BCS national champion (2008)

Demetrius Byrd (born June 30, 1986) is an American former professional football player who was a wide receiver in the National Football League (NFL). He was selected by the San Diego Chargers in the seventh round of the 2009 NFL draft. He played college football for the LSU Tigers.

== Early life ==
Byrd played Pop Warner for the Miami Lakes Jaguars under head coach Buck Bailey, who produced players in the NFL such as Chad Johnson, Chad Simpson, Samari Rolle, Gartrell Johnson and many more.

Byrd played just one year at the high school level — his senior season at Miami Central High School. He led Miami Dade in yards with 36 catches 864 yards and 10 touchdowns his first year playing high school football. He signed with Florida International University, but opted to enroll in Pearl River Community College instead.

== College career ==
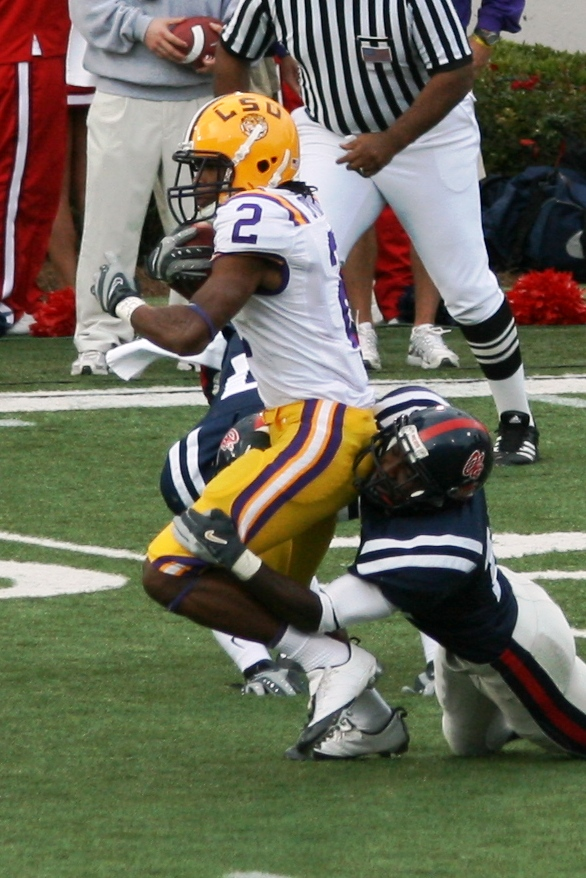
Byrd being tackled against Ole Miss

Byrd started for two years at Pearl River, helping that school to back-to-back Mississippi state junior college championships. He was coached by former JCJC (Jones County Jr. College) WR Coach Melvin Tart. He combined to catch 87 balls for 1,433 yards and 12 touchdowns during his career, earning first-team All-American junior college honors this past season. Byrd was rated the No. 8 junior college wide receiver in America by JCGridiron.com in 2006.

He transferred to LSU in 2007 and became an immediate contributor to the team. The biggest moment of his short college career came on October 20, 2007, when he caught a game-winning touchdown pass from quarterback Matt Flynn with time expiring in regulation vs. rival Auburn University.

== Professional career ==
On April 26, 2009, Byrd was selected by the San Diego Chargers 224th overall in the seventh round of the 2009 NFL draft. This was despite a serious car accident in Florida a week before the draft. Byrd was upgraded from critical to good and discharged from the Intensive care unit. Byrd was placed on the non-football injury/illness reserve list before the 2009 season. On March 22, 2010, Byrd was released by the Chargers.

== Personal life ==
As of September 2015, Byrd works as a trainer and insurance salesman. In 2026, Byrd was arrested in Miami Beach, Florida for aggravated assault with a deadly weapon. As of July 2026 Byrd was homeless before entering prison.
