= 2007 SEC Championship Game =

- Conference Championship
- 2007 SEC Championship logo
Tennessee Volunteers	LSU Tigers
(9–3)	(10–2)
14	21
Head coach: Phillip Fulmer	Head coach: Les Miles
AP / Coaches / BCS; 14 / 15 / 14	AP / Coaches / BCS; 5 / 7 / 7
	1	2	3	4	Total
Tennessee	7	0	7	0	14
LSU	6	0	7	8	21
- Date: December 1, 2007
- Season: 2007
- Stadium: Georgia Dome
- Location: Atlanta, Georgia
- MVP: QB Ryan Perrilloux, LSU
- Favorite: LSU by 7
- National anthem: Pride of the Southland Band; Tiger Marching Band
- Referee: Tom Ritter
- Halftime show: Pride of the Southland Band; Tiger Marching Band
- Attendance: 73,832

United States TV coverage
- Network: CBS
- Announcers: Verne Lundquist & Gary Danielson
- Nielsen ratings: 5.9

2007 Southeastern Conference football standings
	Conf.			Overall
Team	W		L	W		L
Eastern Division
No. 12 Tennessee xy	6	–	2	10	–	4
No. 2 Georgia x%	6	–	2	11	–	2
No. 13 Florida	5	–	3	9	–	4
South Carolina	3	–	5	6	–	6
Kentucky	3	–	5	8	–	5
Vanderbilt	2	–	6	5	–	7
Western Division
No. 1 LSU x$#	6	–	2	12	–	2
No. 15 Auburn	5	–	3	9	–	4
Arkansas	4	–	4	8	–	5
Mississippi State	4	–	4	8	–	5
Alabama	4	–	4	7	–	6
Ole Miss	0	–	8	3	–	9
Championship: LSU 21, Tennessee 14
# – BCS National Champion; $ – BCS representative as conference champion; % – BCS at-large representative; x – Division champion/co-champions; y – Championship game participant; Alabama had 5 victories vacated by the NCAA in 2010. As such, the official record for Alabama is 2–6 (1–4).; Rankings from AP Poll

The 2007 SEC Championship Game was played on December 1, 2007, in the Georgia Dome in Atlanta, Georgia. The game determined the 2007 football champion of the Southeastern Conference. The LSU Tigers, winners of the Western division of the SEC, defeated the Tennessee Volunteers, who won the Eastern division, by a score of 21–14. This was the second time the two teams have met in the conference championship game.

== Selection process ==
The SEC Championship Game matches up the winner of the Eastern and Western divisions of the Southeastern Conference. The game was first played in 1992, when the conference expanded from 10 to 12 teams with the addition of Arkansas and South Carolina. The SEC was the first conference in college football to have a conference championship game.

== Regular season ==
LSU was ranked as high as #1 in the country and was a favorite to play in the national title game, however those dreams were thought to have been shattered when the Tigers lost to unranked Arkansas in 3 overtime periods at home on the final game of the regular season. LSU finished the regular season with a 10–2 record. They were 6–2 in the SEC and won the SEC Western Division outright.

Tennessee began the season with a highly anticipated out-of-conference matchup with California in Berkeley. The 15th ranked Vols lost to the 12th ranked Golden Bears, 45–31. Tennessee slipped in the polls, eventually losing twice more to Florida and Alabama, however, they finished the season strong, winning their last five games. In the final game of the regular season, the Volunteers needed to beat Kentucky in order to secure a berth in the SEC Championship Game. If Kentucky won, then Georgia would be the representative from the Eastern division. The game was an exciting one as it went into 4 overtime periods. The Volunteers eventually won it by sacking Kentucky QB Andre Woodson during a 2-point conversion attempt. Tennessee finished the regular season with a 9–3 overall record and a 6–2 record in the SEC Eastern division. They tied with Georgia as champions of the SEC East, however, by virtue of a head-to-head victory over Georgia, the Volunteers were the SEC East representatives in the championship game.

== Pre-game ==
Prior to the game, LSU was faced with many distractions. On Friday, November 30, news sources leaked that Nebraska had hired defensive coordinator Bo Pelini to be their new head coach. On the morning of game day, ESPN reported that LSU head coach Les Miles would be announced as the new head coach of Michigan. Later on that day, Les Miles called a press conference to announce that he was would not be leaving LSU to coach Michigan. Also on the minds of the Tigers, quarterback Matt Flynn would not start due to an injury. Instead, Ryan Perrilloux would get the start.

== Game summary ==
LSU won the game by a score of 21–14, after Erik Ainge threw two interceptions in the 4th quarter.
