= 2007 Mississippi State Bulldogs football team =

American college football season

2007 Mississippi State Bulldogs football

Liberty Bowl champion

Liberty Bowl, W 10–3 vs. UCF
- Conference: Southeastern Conference
- Western Division
- Record: 8–5 (4–4 SEC)
- Head coach: Sylvester Croom (4th season)
- Offensive coordinator: Woody McCorvey (4th season)
- Offensive scheme: Pro-style
- Defensive coordinator: Ellis Johnson (4th season)
- Base defense: 4–2–5
- Home stadium: Davis Wade Stadium

2007 Southeastern Conference football standings
| | Conf. | | | Overall |
| Team | W | | L | W | | L |
|---|---|---|---|---|---|---|
Eastern Division
| No. 12 Tennessee xy | 6 | – | 2 | 10 | – | 4 |
| No. 2 Georgia x% | 6 | – | 2 | 11 | – | 2 |
| No. 13 Florida | 5 | – | 3 | 9 | – | 4 |
| South Carolina | 3 | – | 5 | 6 | – | 6 |
| Kentucky | 3 | – | 5 | 8 | – | 5 |
| Vanderbilt | 2 | – | 6 | 5 | – | 7 |
Western Division
| No. 1 LSU x$# | 6 | – | 2 | 12 | – | 2 |
| No. 15 Auburn | 5 | – | 3 | 9 | – | 4 |
| Arkansas | 4 | – | 4 | 8 | – | 5 |
| Mississippi State | 4 | – | 4 | 8 | – | 5 |
| Alabama | 4 | – | 4 | 7 | – | 6 |
| Ole Miss | 0 | – | 8 | 3 | – | 9 |
Championship: LSU 21, Tennessee 14
# – BCS National Champion; $ – BCS representative as conference champion; % – BCS at-large representative; x – Division champion/co-champions; y – Championship game participant; Alabama had 5 victories vacated by the NCAA in 2010. As such, the official record for Alabama is 2–6 (1–4).; Rankings from AP Poll

The 2007 Mississippi State Bulldogs football team represented Mississippi State University during the 2007 NCAA Division I FBS football season. The team's head coach was Sylvester Croom, who served his fourth season in the position. The Bulldogs played their six home games in 2007 at Davis Wade Stadium in Starkville, Mississippi.

The Bulldogs' record of 8–5 (4–4 in the SEC) was MSU's first winning record since the 2000 season, when the team finished 8–4 (4–4 in conference). The Bulldogs earned their first bowl game berth since 2000 by reaching the 2007 Liberty Bowl. Mississippi State's victory there over Conference USA champion UCF also marked MSU's first bowl victory since 2000, when the Bulldogs defeated Texas A&M, 43–41 in overtime, to win the 2000 Independence Bowl under head coach Jackie Sherrill. For the Bulldogs' improvement, Croom was voted the 2007 SEC Coach of the Year by his peers.

== Preseason ==
At the 2007 SEC Football Media Days in Hoover, Alabama, Mississippi State was predicted to finish 6th in the SEC Western Division, based on a poll of SEC coaches.

=== Players departing ===
Seven starters departed from States' 2006 squad. All of them were seniors whose eligibility expired:

- RG **Brian Anderson**, 6'6", 300 lbs., Three-year starter (started all 12 games in 2006)
- LB **Quinton Culberson**, 6'1", 236 lbs., All-SEC First-Team (102 tackles, 8 TFLs, 1 sack, 6 passes defended, 2 INTs in 2006)
- RCB **David Heard**, 6'0", 192 lbs., Three year starter (45 tackles, 3 TFLs, 8 passes defended, 2 INTs in 2006)
- DE **Michael Heard**, 6'2", 259 lbs., (37 tackles, 4.5 TFLs, 6.5 sacks in 2006)
- S **Jeramie Johnson**, 5'11", 213 lbs., (72 tackles, 3 TFLs, 5 passes defended in 2006)
- DT/LB **Anwar Phillips**, 6'0", 258 lbs., ()
- DT **Andrew Powell**, 6'1", 290 lbs., (34 tackles, 1.5 TFLs, .5 sack in 2006)
- DT **Deljuan Robinson**, 6'3", 287 lbs., (34 tackles, 11 TFLs, 1.5 sacks in 2006)

Also departed are Seniors Omar Conner, who completed 76 of 135 passes (56.3%) for 943 yards and three touchdowns (three interceptions), rushed 37 times for 101 yards (2.7 average) and two touchdowns, and caught eight passes for 70 yards while splitting time at WR and QB, WR Will Prosser (11 receptions, 135 yards) and DT Antonio Johnson (21 tackles, 4 TFLs), who was selected by the Tennessee Titans with the 152nd pick of the 2007 NFL draft.

=== Players returning ===
Despite the loss of several standout veteran players from the Bulldogs' 2006 squad, the 2007 Bulldogs boast an experienced lineup, including 17 returning starters.

==== Offense ====
State's offense in 2007 includes ten returning starters from 2006 (in bold).

Under center, Junior Michael Henig will get the first look at QB for the 'Dogs' after starting six games and completing 74 of 169 pass attempts (43.8%) for 1201 yards and seven touchdowns (nine interceptions) as a Sophomore in 2006. He will be challenged by Sophomores Ty Evans and Zack Harrington as well as incoming JUCO transfer Josh Riddell.

The Bulldogs will get back their top five pass receivers from 2006: Tony Burks (35 catches, 850 yards, 5 touchdowns, led SEC with 24.3 yards per reception), Jamayel Smith (20 receptions, 335 yards, 2 touchdowns), TE Eric Butler (13 receptions, 210 yards, 1 touchdown), Lance Long (25 receptions, 177 yards, 1 touchdown) and Aubrey Bell (8 receptions, 151 yards). Also returning are backup TEs Dezmond Sherrod (just 7 career receptions, but a solid blocking TE) and Jason Husband (9 receptions, 89 yards, 1 touchdown in 2006).

Sophomore RB Anthony Dixon emerged as a star in his 2006 true-Freshman season, rushing 169 times for 668 yards (4 yards per carry) and 9 touchdowns. He looks to handle the 'Dogs' starting RB duties again in 2007. Backups Arnil Stallworth, Justin Williams and Christian Ducré all return, as well. Juniors Eric Hoskins, who redshirted in 2006 after transferring from Holmes, and Brandon Hart, a converted RB, will share the FB duties.

Up front, the Bulldogs have C Royce Blacledge, who returns to anchor the unit in his Senior season after starting every game there as a Junior in 2006; Sophomore Craig Jenkins, who started every game at RT in 2006, moves to RG; Juniors Anthony Strauder and Michael Gates, who split time at LG both return, as do Junior Michael Brown, who transferred to State after redshirting at Florida, and Senior swing G/T J.D. Hamilton, both of whom split time at LT last season.

- **Offensive Depth** (as of December 29, 2007)

| | STARTER | Backup | Backup |
|---|---|---|---|
| Z WR | #4 **Tony Burks** 6'4", 217 lbs., Sr. Gulfport, Mississippi | #86 Lance Long 5'11", 186 lbs., Sr. Macomb, Michigan | #81 Brandon McRae 6'4", 200 lbs., So. Chester, Virginia |
| TE | #48 Dezmond Sherrod 6'3", 245 lbs., Sr. Caledonia, Mississippi | #88 **Eric Butler** 6'3", 255 lbs., Sr. Moss Point, Mississippi | #82 Jason Husband 6'3", 230 lbs., Sr. Jackson, Mississippi |
| RT | #60 **J.D. Hamilton** 6'4", 300 lbs., Sr. Natchez, Mississippi | #79 Derek Sherrod 6'5", 298 lbs., Fr. Caledonia, Mississippi | #67 Roland Terry 6'7", 298 lbs., Jr. Meridian, Mississippi |
| RG | #78 Michael Gates 6'4", 305 lbs., Jr. Fairburn, Georgia | #75 **Craig Jenkins** 6'4", 315 lbs., So. Pearl, Mississippi | #63 Chris Spencer 6'3", 305 lbs., So. Meridian, Mississippi |
| C | #76 **Royce Blackledge** 6'4", 293 lbs., Sr. Sandersville, Mississippi | #58 Johnny Carpenter 6'2", 290 lbs., So. Citronelle, Alabama | |
| LG | #53 **Anthony Strauder** 6'3", 295 lbs., Jr. Natchez, Mississippi | #70 J.C. Brignone 6'1", 290 lbs., RS Fr. Pass Christian, Mississippi | #72 John McMillan 6'2", 285 lbs., RS Fr. Paragould, Arkansas |
| LT | #77 **Michael Brown** 6'5", 300 lbs., Jr. College Park, Georgia | #74 Mark Melichar 6'5", 290 lbs., RS Fr. Birmingham, Alabama | |
| X WR | #89 **Jamayel Smith** 6'0", 183 lbs., Jr. East Point, Georgia | #87 Aubrey Bell 6'3", 217 lbs., Jr. Prichard, Alabama | #15 Co-Eric Riley 6'1", 200 lbs., Jr. Lucedale, Mississippi |
| QB | #13 Wesley Carroll 6'2", 190 lbs., Fr. Parkland, Florida | #7 **Michael Henig** 6'1", 190 lbs., Jr. Montgomery, Alabama | #17 Josh Riddell 6'1", 195 lbs., Jr. Salem, Oregon |
| FB | #38 Eric Hoskins 5'11", 230 lbs., Jr. Weir, Mississippi | #35 Brandon Hart 5'11", 240 lbs., Jr. LaGrange, Georgia | #84 Jeremy Jones 6'2", 275 lbs., Jr. Harvey, Louisiana |
| RB | #24 **Anthony Dixon** 6'1", 240 lbs., So. Terry, Mississippi | #29 Christian Ducré 6'0", 222 lbs., So. Mandeville, Louisiana | #33 Justin Williams 5'10", 207 lbs., Sr. Tallulah, Louisiana |

- "Fr." refers to true freshmen who are in their first season on-campus, unless noted "RS" in which case the player is participating in their first season of eligibility after red-shirting.

==== Defense ====
Despite the loss of six starters from 2006, Mississippi State returns five proven, veteran starters (in bold) and a strong group of young players who will attempt to replace last year's Seniors.

Up front, Senior LDE Titus Brown (38 tackles, 7 TFLs, 7.5 sacks, 1 pass defended in 2006), a 2006 Second-Team All-SEC selection, is the only returning starter, but with 18 career starts under his belt, he has the experience to be a disruptive force for the Bulldogs and to help develop his younger teammates. Senior Avery Hannibal looks to fill the other DE spot, after recording eight tackles, one TFL and one sack in spot-relief of departed Senior Michael Heard in 2006. RS Freshman Brandon Cooper and Juniors Charles Burns and Tim Bailey, a former JUCO star and Army National Guard veteran, can also be expected to compete for time at DE, as well as JUCO newcomer Jimmie Holmes. With all three players who split time at DT in 2006 gone, competition for both starting jobs looks to be wide open. Freshman Reggie Odom, Sophomores Quinton Wesley and Kyle Love (7 tackles in 2006) and Junior Cortez McCraney (10 tackles, 1.5 TFL in 2005) will all have chances to earn the vacant spots, but they will be challenged by newcomers like JUCO transfer Jessie Bowman and true-Freshman LaMarcus Williams.

At LB, Senior Gabe O'Neal (40 tackles, 3 TFL in 2006) and Junior Jamar Chaney (66 tackles, 5 TFL, 2.5 sacks) seem to have what it takes to maintain the respective starting SLB and MLB spots that they occupied in 2006. Sophomore Jamon Hughes (17 tackles) and Junior Anthony Littlejohn (12 tackles, 1 pass defended) look to be the top contenders to earn the final WLB spot, along with JUCO transfer Dominic Douglas.

In the secondary, Mississippi State returns two Junior defensive stars in SS Keith Fitzhugh (59 tackles, .5 TFL, 3 passes defended, 1 INT in 2006) and 2006 Second-Team All-SEC selection Derek Pegues (32 tackles, 1.5 TFL, 5 passes defended, 4 INTs), who will move from CB to FS. Sophomores Anthony Johnson (12 tackles, 1 pass defended) and Marcus Washington (6 tackles) will compete for the vacated CB spots, along with Juniors Demario Bobo (65 tackles, 2 TFLs, 2 FFs, 2 passes defended from 2004–2005) and Keon Humphries, a converted WR, and JUCO transfers Jasper O'Quinn and Chris Nance.

- **Defensive Depth** (as of December 29, 2007)

| | STARTER | Backup | Backup |
|---|---|---|---|
| LDE | #54 **Titus Brown** 6'3", 250 lbs., Sr. Tuscaloosa, Alabama | #39 Tim Bailey 6'3", 241 lbs., Jr. Greenville, Mississippi | #91 Rodney Prince 6'3", 252 lbs., RS Fr. Irondale, Alabama |
| LDT | #95 Kyle Love 6'1", 312 lbs., So. Fairburn, Georgia | #90 Cortez McCraney 6'4", 272 lbs., Jr. Southaven, Mississippi | #96 Reggie Odom 6'0", 295 lbs., RS Fr. DeLand, Florida |
| RDT | #94 Jessie Bowman 6'1", 305 lbs., Jr. Brookhaven, Mississippi | #98 LaMarcus Williams 6'1", 290 lbs., Fr. Bastrop, Louisiana | #99 Quinton Wesley 6'4", 315 lbs., So. Atlanta |
| RDE | #51 Avery Hannibal 6'1", 240 lbs., Sr. LaGrange, Georgia | #93 Brandon Cooper 6'3", 240 lbs., RS Fr. Missouri City, Texas | #97 Jimmie Holmes 6'3", 235 lbs., Jr. Aiken, South Carolina |
| SLB | #5 **Gabe O'Neal** 6'1", 220 lbs., Sr. Columbus, Mississippi | #34 K. J. Wright 6'3", 215 lbs., Fr. Olive Branch, Mississippi | |
| MLB | #22 **Jamar Chaney** 6'1", 236 lbs., Jr. Ft. Pierce, Florida | #36 Jamon Hughes 6'0", 230 lbs., So. Rolling Fork, Mississippi | |
| WLB | #10 Dominic Douglas 6'2", 227 lbs., Jr. Clinton, Mississippi | #56 Anthony Littlejohn 6'1", 230 lbs., Jr. Jacksonville, Florida | #52 Karlin Brown 5'9", 195 lbs., Fr. Tallahassee, Florida |
| LCB | #11 Anthony Johnson 5'10", 194 lbs., So. Jackson, Mississippi | #28 Tay Bowser 6'3", 185 lbs., So. Gilmer, Texas | #27 Jarvis Kyles 6'0", 185 lbs., So. Milledgeville, Georgia |
| RCB | #23 Jasper O'Quinn 5'10", 185 lbs., Jr. Bude, Mississippi | #18 Marcus Washington 5'10", 180 lbs., So. Missouri City, Texas | #40 Chris Nance 5'10", 182 lbs., Jr. Tuscumbia, Alabama |
| SS | #8 De'Mon Glanton 6'1", 190 lbs., Jr. Atlanta | #1 **Keith Fitzhugh** 5'11", 206 lbs., Jr. Hampton, Georgia | |
| FS | #3 **Derek Pegues** 5'10", 196 lbs., Jr. Batesville, Mississippi | #6 Demario Bobo 6'0", 180 lbs., Jr. Courtland, Mississippi | #42 Zach Smith 6'0", 180 lbs., Fr. Altoona, Alabama |

==== Special teams ====
Mississippi State returns virtually all of its key players in the kicking game (returning staters in bold).

Junior K Adam Carlson (8 of 16 career FGs, 58 career points, 47 career long) is back after his first full season as a starter. Carlson will also handle kickoff duties for the second straight year. In 2006, he kicked off 31 times for an average of 54.2 yards. Also, returning is Junior P Blake McAdams, who averaged 38.2 yards per kick and landed 15 of his 68 punts inside opponents' 20. Derek Pegues will again handle punt and kick returning duties after returning 25 punts an average of 14 yards with one touchdown and taking back 29 kickoffs an average of 23.7 yards in 2006.

- **Special Teams Depth** (as of December 29, 2007)

| | STARTER | Backup | Backup |
|---|---|---|---|
| K | #37 **Adam Carlson** 6'4", 195 lbs., Jr. Gulfport, Mississippi | #41 Brad Moore 6'1", 190 lbs., RS Fr. Starkville, Mississippi | |
| LS | #46 Aaron Feld 6'1", 225 lbs., RS Fr. Homewood, Alabama | #65 Anthony Bowles 5'11", 220 lbs., Jr. Grenada, Mississippi | |
| H | #43 **Blake McAdams** 5'10", 190 lbs., Jr. Ripley, Tennessee | #45 Ben Shelton 5'11", 196 lbs., Sr. Vicksburg, Mississippi | |
| KOS | #37 **Adam Carlson** 6'4", 195 lbs., Jr. Gulfport, Mississippi | #43 Blake McAdams 5'10", 190 lbs., Jr. Ripley, Tennessee | |
| KR | #3 **Derek Pegues** 5'10", 196 lbs., Jr. Batesville, Mississippi | #86 Lance Long 5'11", 186 lbs., Sr. Macomb, Michigan | #29 Christian Ducré 6'0", 222 lbs., So. Mandeville, Louisiana |
| P | #43 **Blake McAdams** 5'10", 190 lbs., Jr. Ripley, Tennessee | #37 Adam Carlson 6'4", 195 lbs., Jr. Gulfport, Mississippi | |
| PR | #3 **Derek Pegues** 5'10", 196 lbs., Jr. Batesville, Mississippi | #33 Justin Williams 5'10", 207 lbs., Sr. Tallulah, Louisiana | #15 Co-Eric Riley 6'1", 200 lbs., Jr. Lucedale, Mississippi |

=== Newcomers: 2007 signing class ===
MSU signed a total of 34 players to letters of intent, comprising the Bulldogs' 2007 signing class. The class was headlined by a large number of in-state high school recruits including RB/S Marcus Green (Meridian), DT Quentin Saulsberry (Independence), OT Derek Sherrod (Caledonia) and RB Robert Elliot (Okolona), who chose the Bulldogs on National Signing Day following a recruiting battle between MSU, Ole Miss and Florida State. The Bulldogs capped off a solid 2007 high school class with several junior college signees, such as DT Jessie Bowman (Brookhaven/Co-Lin) and WR Co-Eric Riley (Lucedale/Gulf Coast). Additionally, MSU signed several out-of-State players including high school DT LaMarcus Williams (Bastrop, Louisiana) and JUCO QB Josh Riddell (Salem, Oregon/Foothill). Rivals.com ranked State's 2007 class 39th in the Nation, while Scout.com had the Bulldogs' class at 27th. With a consensus top-40 class, the Bulldogs will expect and need some newcomers to make an immediate impact on the field.

College recruiting information (2007)
| Name | Hometown | School | Height | Weight | 40^{‡} | Commit date |
|---|---|---|---|---|---|---|
| **Damein Anderson**; CB | Hazlehurst, Mississippi | **Hazlehurst High School** | 5 ft 10 in (1.78 m) | 170 lb (77 kg) | 4.51 | Mar 28, 2006 |
| **Damein Anderson**; CB | Recruit ratings: Scout: Rivals: (74) | | | | | |
| ***Korentheus Bailey**; DT | Gainesville, Georgia | **East Hall County High School** | 6 ft 3 in (1.91 m) | 250 lb (110 kg) | 5.5 | Nov 30, 2006 |
| ***Korentheus Bailey**; DT | Recruit ratings: Scout: Rivals: (64) | | | | | |
| **Wade Bonner**; CB | Somerville, Tennessee | **Fayette-Ware Comprehensive High School** | 5 ft 11 in (1.80 m) | 185 lb (84 kg) | 4.48 | Dec 3, 2006 |
| **Wade Bonner**; CB | Recruit ratings: Scout: Rivals: (74) | | | | | |
| **Jessie Bowman (TR)**; DT | Brookhaven, Mississippi | **Brookhaven High School**, **Copiah-Lincoln Community College** | 6 ft 1 in (1.85 m) | 335 lb (152 kg) | 5.0 | Dec 13, 2006 |
| **Jessie Bowman (TR)**; DT | Recruit ratings: Scout: Rivals: (N/A) | | | | | |
| **Karlin Brown**; LB | Tallahassee, Florida | **Lincoln High School** | 5 ft 10 in (1.78 m) | 200 lb (91 kg) | 4.5 | May 26, 2006 |
| **Karlin Brown**; LB | Recruit ratings: Scout: Rivals: (74) | | | | | |
| **Wesley Carroll**; QB | Ft. Lauderdale, Florida | **St. Thomas Aquinas High School** | 6 ft 2 in (1.88 m) | 190 lb (86 kg) | 4.5 | Dec 14, 2006 |
| **Wesley Carroll**; QB | Recruit ratings: Scout: Rivals: (72) | | | | | |
| ***Maurice Crutison**; LB | Port Gibson, Mississippi | **Port Gibson High School** | 6 ft 2 in (1.88 m) | 210 lb (95 kg) | 4.51 | May 1, 2006 |
| ***Maurice Crutison**; LB | Recruit ratings: Scout: Rivals: (74) | | | | | |
| ***Antwon Dixon**; S | Terry, Mississippi | **Terry High School** | 6 ft 1 in (1.85 m) | 200 lb (91 kg) | 4.53 | Aug 31, 2006 |
| ***Antwon Dixon**; S | Recruit ratings: Scout: Rivals: (74) | | | | | |
| **Dominic Douglas (TR)**; LB | Clinton, Mississippi | **Clinton High School**, **Hinds Community College** | 6 ft 2 in (1.88 m) | 220 lb (100 kg) | 4.6 | Oct 30, 2006 |
| **Dominic Douglas (TR)**; LB | Recruit ratings: Scout: Rivals: (N/A) | | | | | |
| **Robert Elliot**; RB | Okolona, Mississippi | **Okolona High School** | 6 ft 0 in (1.83 m) | 191 lb (87 kg) | 4.58 | Feb 7, 2007 |
| **Robert Elliot**; RB | Recruit ratings: Scout: Rivals: (77) | | | | | |
| **Marcus Green**; RB/S | De Kalb, Mississippi | **Kemper County High School** | 6 ft 2 in (1.88 m) | 210 lb (95 kg) | 4.5 | Aug 18, 2006 |
| **Marcus Green**; RB/S | Recruit ratings: Scout: Rivals: (76) | | | | | |
| ***Jazzmen Guy**; DE | Hazlehurst, Mississippi | **Hazlehurst High School** | 6 ft 5 in (1.96 m) | 265 lb (120 kg) | 4.71 | Apr 1, 2006 |
| ***Jazzmen Guy**; DE | Recruit ratings: Scout: Rivals: (77) | | | | | |
| **Jimmie Holmes (TR)**; DE | Aiken, South Carolina | **Aiken High School**, **Mississippi Delta Community College** | 6 ft 3 in (1.91 m) | 227 lb (103 kg) | 4.7 | Aug 26, 2006 |
| **Jimmie Holmes (TR)**; DE | Recruit ratings: Scout: Rivals: (N/A) | | | | | |
| ***Mike Hunt**; S | Meadville, Mississippi | **Franklin County High School** | 6 ft 2 in (1.88 m) | 208 lb (94 kg) | 4.64 | May 26, 2006 |
| ***Mike Hunt**; S | Recruit ratings: Scout: Rivals: (74) | | | | | |
| ***Colton Jenkins**; OT | Winona, Mississippi | **Winon High School** | 6 ft 5 in (1.96 m) | 284 lb (129 kg) | 5.2 | Jul 31, 2006 |
| ***Colton Jenkins**; OT | Recruit ratings: Scout: Rivals: (74) | | | | | |
| **Terrell Johnson**; LB | Silas, Alabama | **Southern Choctaw County High School** | 6 ft 2 in (1.88 m) | 205 lb (93 kg) | 4.6 | Dec 6, 2006 |
| **Terrell Johnson**; LB | Recruit ratings: Scout: Rivals: (40) | | | | | |
| **Jamie Jones**; LB | Springdale, Arkansas | **Springdale High School** | 6 ft 1 in (1.85 m) | 215 lb (98 kg) | 4.58 | Jan 30, 2007 |
| **Jamie Jones**; LB | Recruit ratings: Scout: Rivals: (75) | | | | | |
| **Addison Lawrence**; TE | Coldwater, Mississippi | **Magnolia Heights School** | 6 ft 4 in (1.93 m) | 251 lb (114 kg) | 5.03 | Jun 15, 2006 |
| **Addison Lawrence**; TE | Recruit ratings: Scout: Rivals: (69) | | | | | |
| **D.J. Looney**; C | Birmingham, Alabama | **Oak Mountain High School** | 6 ft 1.5 in (1.87 m) | 292 lb (132 kg) | 5.49 | Jun 19, 2006 |
| **D.J. Looney**; C | Recruit ratings: Scout: Rivals: (76) | | | | | |
| **Dakota Merritt**; OT | Cantonment, Florida | **West Florida High School of Advanced Technology** | 6 ft 5 in (1.96 m) | 297 lb (135 kg) | 5.0 | Jul 13, 2006 |
| **Dakota Merritt**; OT | Recruit ratings: Scout: Rivals: (66) | | | | | |
| **Chris Nance (TR)**; CB | Tuscumbia, Alabama | **Deshler High School**, **Northeast Mississippi Community College** | 5 ft 10 in (1.78 m) | 185 lb (84 kg) | 4.5 | Dec 14, 2006 |
| **Chris Nance (TR)**; CB | Recruit ratings: Scout: Rivals: (N/A) | | | | | |
| **Jasper O'Quinn (TR)**; CB | Meadville, Mississippi | **Franklin County High School**, **Copiah-Lincoln Community College** | 5 ft 10 in (1.78 m) | 185 lb (84 kg) | 4.45 | Dec 12, 2006 |
| **Jasper O'Quinn (TR)**; CB | Recruit ratings: Scout: Rivals: (N/A) | | | | | |
| **Chris Relf**; QB | Montgomery, Alabama | **Carver High School** | 6 ft 3 in (1.91 m) | 206 lb (93 kg) | 4.87 | May 3, 2006 |
| **Chris Relf**; QB | Recruit ratings: Scout: Rivals: (76) | | | | | |
| **Eric Richards**; K | Vicksburg, Mississippi | **Warren Central High School** | 6 ft 4 in (1.93 m) | 225 lb (102 kg) | 4.9 | Sep 10, 2006 |
| **Eric Richards**; K | Recruit ratings: Scout: Rivals: (78) | | | | | |
| **Josh Riddell (TR)**; QB | Salem, Oregon | **McKay High School**, **Foothill College** | 6 ft 2 in (1.88 m) | 200 lb (91 kg) | 4.7 | Dec 17, 2007 |
| **Josh Riddell (TR)**; QB | Recruit ratings: Scout: Rivals: (N/A) | | | | | |
| **Co-Eric Riley (TR)**; WR | Lucedale, Mississippi | **George County High School**, **Mississippi Gulf Coast Community College** | 6 ft 2 in (1.88 m) | 200 lb (91 kg) | 4.5 | May 10, 2006 |
| **Co-Eric Riley (TR)**; WR | Recruit ratings: Scout: Rivals: (N/A) | | | | | |
| **Quentin Saulsberry**; DT | Tate County, Mississippi | **Independence High School** | 6 ft 2 in (1.88 m) | 270 lb (120 kg) | 5.15 | Jul 22, 2006 |
| **Quentin Saulsberry**; DT | Recruit ratings: Scout: Rivals: (74) | | | | | |
| **Derek Sherrod**; OT | Caledonia, Mississippi | **Caledonia High School** | 6 ft 6 in (1.98 m) | 300 lb (140 kg) | 5.3 | Aug 5, 2006 |
| **Derek Sherrod**; OT | Recruit ratings: Scout: Rivals: (78) | | | | | |
| **Zach Smith**; S | Altoona, Alabama | **Susan Moore High School** | 6 ft 0 in (1.83 m) | 175 lb (79 kg) | 4.52 | Nov 12, 2006 |
| **Zach Smith**; S | Recruit ratings: Scout: Rivals: (76) | | | | | |
| **Ethan Stockett**; FB | Ft. Smith, Arkansas | **Southside High School** | 6 ft 1 in (1.85 m) | 252 lb (114 kg) | 4.8 | May 12, 2006 |
| **Ethan Stockett**; FB | Recruit ratings: Scout: Rivals: (66) | | | | | |
| ***Antonio White**; LB | Hollandale, Mississippi | **Simmons High School** | 6 ft 2 in (1.88 m) | 240 lb (110 kg) | 4.6 | May 4, 2006 |
| ***Antonio White**; LB | Recruit ratings: Scout: Rivals: (75) | | | | | |
| ***O'Neal Wilder**; WR | Carthage, Mississippi | **Carthage High School** | 6 ft 5 in (1.96 m) | 200 lb (91 kg) | 4.48 | Feb 6, 2007 |
| ***O'Neal Wilder**; WR | Recruit ratings: Scout: Rivals: (40) | | | | | |
| **LaMarcus Williams**; DT | Bastrop, Louisiana | **Bastrop High School** | 6 ft 1 in (1.85 m) | 290 lb (130 kg) | 4.9 | Feb 7, 2006 |
| **LaMarcus Williams**; DT | Recruit ratings: Scout: Rivals: (72) | | | | | |
| **K. J. Wright**; LB | Olive Branch, Mississippi | **Olive Branch High School** | 6 ft 3 in (1.91 m) | 205 lb (93 kg) | 4.67 | Dec 25, 2006 |
| **K. J. Wright**; LB | Recruit ratings: Scout: Rivals: (40) | | | | | |
Overall recruit ranking: Scout: 27 Rivals: 39
‡ Refers to 40-yard dash; Note: In many cases, Scout, Rivals, 247Sports, On3, and ESPN may conflict in their listings of height, weight and 40 time.; In these cases, the average was taken. ESPN grades are on a 100-point scale.; Sources: "MSU Commit List 2007". Rivals.; "Scout.com Football Recruiting: MSU". Scout.; "2007 Player Commitments – MSU". ESPN.; "Scout.com Team Recruiting Rankings". Scout.; "2007 Team Ranking". Rivals.com.

- **(TR)** indicates signees who are transferring to MSU from another collegiate institution and therefore have only two seasons of NCAA eligibility remaining, instead of the standard four.
- Although Mississippi State signed 34 players in their 2007 class, the Bulldogs had only 26 football scholarships available to offer for the 2007 season (a situation referred to as "oversigning"). Signees who do not appear on MSU's 2007 roster due to oversigning, failure to qualify academically or any other reason are noted with an asterisk *.

== Schedule ==
Analyst Phil Steele ranked MSU's 2007 schedule strength 29th in the Nation in his 2007 preview magazine.

| Date | Time | Opponent | Site | TV | Result | Attendance |
|---|---|---|---|---|---|---|
| August 30 | 7:00 pm | No. 2 LSU | Davis Wade Stadium; Starkville, Mississippi (rivalry) | ESPN | L 0–45 | 50,112 |
| September 8 | 6:00 pm | at Tulane* | Louisiana Superdome; New Orleans, LA | CSS | W 38–17 | 31,076 |
| September 15 | 11:30 am | at Auburn | Jordan-Hare Stadium; Auburn, AL | LFS | W 19–14 | 82,129 |
| September 22 | 6:00 pm | Gardner–Webb* | Davis Wade Stadium; Starkville, MS | | W 31–15 | 42,272 |
| September 29 | 11:00 am | at No. 16 South Carolina | Williams–Brice Stadium; Columbia, SC | LFS | L 21–38 | 78,883 |
| October 6 | 1:30 pm | UAB*^{†} | Davis Wade Stadium; Starkville, MS | | W 30–13 | 45,259 |
| October 13 | 1:30 pm | No. 25 Tennessee | Davis Wade Stadium; Starkville, MS | PPV | L 21–33 | 50,217 |
| October 20 | 2:30 pm | at No. 9 West Virginia* | Mountaineer Field; Morgantown, West Virginia | ESPN Plus | L 13–38 | 61,022 |
| October 27 | 11:30 am | at No. 14 Kentucky | Commonwealth Stadium; Lexington, KY | LFS | W 31–14 | 68,173 |
| November 10 | 11:30 am | No. 21 Alabama | Davis Wade Stadium; Starkville, MS (rivalry) | LFS | W 17–12 | 56,188 |
| November 17 | 1:00 pm | at Arkansas | War Memorial Stadium; Little Rock, AR | | L 31–45 | 55,185 |
| November 23 | 11:30 am | Ole Miss | Davis Wade Stadium; Starkville, MS (Egg Bowl) | LFS | W 17–14 | 51,727 |
| December 29 | 3:30 pm | vs. UCF* | Liberty Bowl Memorial Stadium; Memphis, TN (Liberty Bowl) | ESPN | W 10–3 | 63,816 |
*Non-conference game; ^{†}Homecoming; Rankings from AP Poll released prior to the game; All times are in Central time

== Game summaries ==
=== LSU ===
| Team | 1 | 2 | 3 | 4 | Total |
|---|---|---|---|---|---|
| • #2 Tigers (12–2, 6–2) | 3 | 14 | 14 | 14 | 45 |
| Bulldogs (0-1, 0-1) | 0 | 0 | 0 | 0 | 0 |

- Date: August 30, 2007
- Location: Davis Wade Stadium, Starkville, Mississippi
- Game start: 7:00 p.m. CST
- Game attendance: 50,112
- Game weather: 77F Thunderstorms

LSU and Mississippi State kicked off the 2007 college football season in a Thursday night SEC contest broadcast live on ESPN, the 101st meeting between the two teams. Through much of the first half it appeared as though Mississippi State was up to the daunting task of challenging the Tigers, then the #2-ranked team in the country behind only USC, as MSU clung to a 0–3 deficit through most of the first half, until LSU scored 14 points in the last six minutes of the second quarter, opening the door for the Tigers to cruise to the final 0–45 margin.

LSU K Colt David warmed up the scoreboard for the Tigers' offense with a 27-yard field goal in the first quarter. Tigers' RB Keiland Williams scored twice on one-yard touchdown runs in the second quarter to push LSU's lead to 0–17 at the half.

In the third quarter, the Tigers' distanced themselves with two eleven-yard touchdown passes from QB Matt Flynn, one to WR Early Doucet and the other to RB Charles Scott, bringing the score to 0–31 to start the fourth quarter. LSU backup QB Ryan Perriloux sealed the Tigers' victory in the fourth quarter with a three-yard touchdown scramble, followed by a 15-yard touchdown pass to WR Brandon LaFell to put LSU up by the final 0–45 margin.

LSU's dominance included earning 22 first downs to MSU's nine and yielding MSU just ten rushing yards on 26 carries. LSU FB Jacob Hester led the Tigers with 14 carries for 72 yards (4.9 yards per carry), while Early Doucet paced LSU's passing attack with 9 catches for 78 yards, including the 11-yard touchdown strike he caught in the third quarter; he was the only LSU receiver to catch more than one pass. For MSU, RB Anthony Dixon led the Bulldogs on the ground with just 29 yards on 13 carries (2.2 average). RB Arnil Stallworth led MSU with only 3 pass receptions for 33 yards.

LSU starting QB Matt Flynn paced his team's offense by completing 12 of 19 passes for 128 yards and two touchdowns and rushing 11 times for 42 yards. Ryan Perriloux ran the Tigers' offense well in relief duty, completing 2 of 3 passes for 21 yards and a touchdown and running 3 times for 12 yards and another score. For MSU, QB Michael Henig completed just 11 of 28 passes on his way to a school record-tying six interception-performance. He was sacked three times for a cumulative loss of 30 yards.

Defensively, LSU LB Ali Highsmith led the Tigers with eight total tackles. Tigers' S Craig Steltz returned three of MSU's six interceptions a total of 100 yards. MSU LB Dominic Douglas, playing in his first career game with the Bulldogs, led all tacklers with nine total, earning "Outstanding Performer" recognition for Week 1.

LSU went on to finish the season 12–2 with a victory over Ohio State in the BCS title game and were ranked #1 in all final major polls.

Scoring summary

| Quarter | Time | Drive | | | Team | Scoring information | Score | |
| Quarter | Time | Plays | Yards | TOP | Team | Scoring information | LSU | MSU |
|---|---|---|---|---|---|---|---|---|
| 1 | 6:28 | | 7-35 | 2:16 | LSU | 27-yard field goal by Colt David | 3 | 0 |
| 2 | 5:52 | | 8-38 | 2:38 | LSU | Keiland Williams 1-yard touchdown run, Colt David kick good | 10 | 0 |
| 2 | :00 | | 7-41 | 1:30 | LSU | Keiland Williams 1-yard touchdown run, Colt David kick good | 17 | 0 |
| 3 | 12:53 | | 6-73 | 2:01 | LSU | Early Doucet 11-yard touchdown reception from Matt Flynn, Colt David kick good | 24 | 0 |
| 3 | 2:09 | | 2-8 | :40 | LSU | Charles Scott 11-yard touchdown reception from Matt Flynn, Colt David kick good | 31 | 0 |
| 4 | 8:20 | | 9-45 | 5:21 | LSU | Ryan Perriloux 3-yard touchdown run, Colt David kick good | 38 | 0 |
| 4 | 5:45 | | 2-36 | :29 | LSU | Brandon LaFell 15-yard touchdown reception from Ryan Perriloux, Colt David kick good | 45 | 0 |
| "TOP" = time of possession. For other American football terms, see Glossary of American football. | | | | | | | 45 | 0 |

=== Tulane ===
| Team | 1 | 2 | 3 | 4 | Total |
|---|---|---|---|---|---|
| • Bulldogs (1–1, 0–1) | 14 | 3 | 14 | 7 | 38 |
| Green Wave (4–8, 3–5) | 14 | 3 | 0 | 0 | 17 |

- Date: September 8, 2007
- Location: Louisiana Superdome, New Orleans
- Game start: 6:00 p.m. CST
- Game attendance: 31,076

After being hammered 0–45 by LSU to open the season, MSU sought its first win of 2007 when the Bulldogs traveled to New Orleans to take on another team from the state of Louisiana, the Tulane Green Wave, in the second week of the season. As with all Tulane home games, the contest was played at the Louisiana Superdome, also the home stadium of the New Orleans Saints. The game was also a homecoming of sorts for MSU RB Christian Ducré, a native of nearby Mandeville who began his college career at Tulane before transferring to State.

Coming into the game, Tulane's All-C-USA RB Matt Forte was regarded as one of the nation's best Running Backs. A 2008 NFL draft prospect, Forte finished the 2007 season by earning AP All-America recognition.

State started the scoring off early in the first quarter, when LB Gabe O'Neal intercepted a pass on the first offensive series of the game and returned it 47 yards for a touchdown. Tulane responded on the next series, however, with a quick three-play, 61-yard drive resulting in a 39-yard touchdown run by Forte. Mississippi State added an 18-yard touchdown run by QB Michael Henig and Tulane tacked on an eight-yard touchdown pass from QB Scott Elliott to FB Jeremy McKinney, all in the first quarter. The only other scoring in the first half came when MSU and Tulane traded field goals in the second quarter, a 23-yarder by Adam Carlson and a 26-yarder by Ross Thevenot, respectively, leaving the score tied 17–17 at halftime.

After the competitive first half, Mississippi State regrouped and the Bulldogs took the game over in the second by scoring 21 unanswered points. FB Jeremy Jones capped off a long drive to open the second half, catching an eight-yard touchdown pass from Michael Henig after MSU's offense covered 67 yards with 9 plays in 3:30. Later in the third quarter, RB Anthony Dixon broke a 27-yard run to stretch the 'Dogs' lead to 14. Dixon sealed the victory for MSU with a seven-yard fourth quarter run that put the Bulldogs ahead by the final margin.

Dixon bounced back from being shut down by LSU in the previous week by rushing for 131 yards on 27 carries (4.9 average) and two touchdowns, earning him "Outstanding Performer" recognition for Week 2. QB Michael Henig posted an admirable performance as well, completing 21 of 30 pass attempts for 223 yards with a touchdown and an interception.

Meanwhile, MSU's defense put up an impressive performance, allowing the Green Wave only eight first downs to MSU's 27 and limiting Forte to 63 yards on 14 carries (3.4 average), his lowest totals of the 2007 season in all three categories. He also lost two fumbles to the 'Dogs' defense.

LB Jamar Chaney led MSU with six total tackles. In addition to his interception return for a touchdown, LB Gabe O'Neal recovered a fumble and recorded four total tackles and was named the SEC's Defensive Player of the Week for Week 2.

Tulane finished the season with an unimpressive 4-8 record, but did manage to finish in third place in the C-USA West.

Scoring summary

| Quarter | Time | Drive | | | Team | Scoring information | Score | |
| Quarter | Time | Plays | Yards | TOP | Team | Scoring information | MSU | TU |
|---|---|---|---|---|---|---|---|---|
| 1 | 13:50 | | -- | -- | MSU | Interception returned 47 yards for touchdown by Gabe O'Neal, Adam Carlson kick good | 7 | 0 |
| 1 | 12:16 | | 3-61 | 1:34 | TU | Matt Forte 39-yard touchdown run, Ross Thevenot kick good | 7 | 7 |
| 1 | 5:10 | | 6-56 | 2:37 | MSU | Michael Henig 18-yard touchdown run, Adam Carlson kick good | 14 | 7 |
| 1 | 2:33 | | 5-73 | 2:37 | TU | Jeremy McKinney 8-yard touchdown reception from Scott Elliott, Ross Thevenot kick good | 14 | 14 |
| 2 | 6:25 | | 11-82 | 4:11 | MSU | 23-yard field goal by Adam Carlson | 17 | 14 |
| 2 | 3:21 | | 9-65 | 3:04 | TU | 26-yard field goal by Ross Thevenot | 17 | 17 |
| 3 | 11:30 | | 9-67 | 3:30 | MSU | Jeremy Jones 8-yard touchdown reception from Michael Henig, Adam Carlson kick good | 24 | 17 |
| 3 | 5:45 | | 1-27 | :09 | MSU | Anthony Dixon 27-yard touchdown run, Adam Carlson kick good | 31 | 17 |
| 4 | 9:33 | | 6-38 | 2:57 | MSU | Anthony Dixon 7-yard touchdown run, Adam Carlson kick good | 38 | 17 |
| "TOP" = time of possession. For other American football terms, see Glossary of American football. | | | | | | | 38 | 17 |

=== Auburn ===
| Team | 1 | 2 | 3 | 4 | Total |
|---|---|---|---|---|---|
| • Bulldogs (2–1, 1–1) | 10 | 3 | 0 | 6 | 19 |
| Tigers (9–4, 5–3) | 0 | 14 | 0 | 0 | 14 |

- Date: September 15, 2007
- Location: Jordan–Hare Stadium, Auburn, Alabama
- Game start: 11:30 a.m. CST
- Game attendance: 82,129
- Game weather: 80F Clear Skies

MSU traveled to Auburn, Alabama for their Week 3 match-up against the favored Auburn Tigers, played at Jordan–Hare Stadium. The Tigers boasted a six-game win streak against the Bulldogs dating back to 2001. Since the 'Dogs defeated the Tigers 17–10 in Starkville in 2000, Auburn had dominated over the course of their six consecutive wins against MSU, outscoring State by an average margin of 25.5 points, including consecutive shutouts in 2005 and 2006.

State (1–1, 0–1) entered the game coming off of an impressive second half rally to cruise by Tulane after their opening week-beating at the hands of LSU. Auburn (1–1, 0–0) had fallen from the national polls by losing to then-unranked South Florida in Week 2, after defeating the Kansas State Wildcats with a 14-point fourth quarter rally in the opening week of the season.

The Bulldogs caught AU off guard, jumping out to a 13–0 lead early in the second quarter. MSU K Adam Carlson scored State's first points with a 32-yard field goal on the game's opening drive, marking the first time MSU had scored on Auburn since 2004. On the next drive, Auburn's first of the game, Tigers' QB Brandon Cox threw an interception caught and returned by MSU FS Derek Pegues for a touchdown less than a minute after Carlson's field goal to give MSU a quick 10–0 lead. Cox again threw an interception on Auburn's ensuing possession, prompting the Tigers to insert true-Freshman backup QB Kodi Burns into the game on their next series. However, he also turned the ball over on his first possession. MSU capitalized on AU's turnovers by adding another Carlson field goal on the ensuing drive to stretch their lead to 13–0.

However, the Tigers mounted a comeback late in the second quarter, when RB Ben Tate ran 28 yards to finally put Auburn on the board. On the ensuing kickoff, MSU KR Derek Pegues fumbled the return, giving AU the ball on State's 30-yard line with 4:12 to play in the first half. After turning the ball over on so many previous possessions, Auburn stuck to their ground game, not attempting a single pass during the ensuing series. Kodi Burns led the way for the Tigers, accounting for five of his team's seven carries and 21 of AU's 30 yards on the drive, capped by his one-yard dive into the endzone to tie the game, with K Wes Byrum's successful Extra point giving the Tigers a 13–14 lead, which they held for the remainder of the first half.

Neither team's offense was able to successfully move the ball in the second half until MSU took possession on AU's 44-yard line with 10:42 left in the fourth quarter, after S Demario Bobo intercepted a Kodi Burns pass.

The ensuing drive was the most important of the game for the Bulldogs, as they marched 44 yards in 10 plays and scored after using over five minutes off of the game clock. MSU RB Christian Ducré, who gained 21 yards on three carries on the drive, punched the ball into the endzone from five yards out for the score. The Bulldogs unsuccessfully attempted a two-point conversion, which left them with a narrow 19–14 lead with over five minutes remaining in the game. Brandon Cox returned to the game on the ensuing drive for Auburn. Cox led his team 67 yards down the field, all the way to MSU 9-yard line, but was unable to score as his fourth down pass attempt fell incomplete, giving State the ball back with just :48 remaining, allowing the 'Dogs to run out the clock and earn their first victory over an SEC opponent in 2007.

Auburn ended the game with 16 first downs to State's 14 and 110 more yards of total offense than MSU, but turnovers proved to be the story of the game with just one for MSU compared to five for AU.

As a team, MSU completed just five (of 18) pass attempts for 41 yards, but was able to rely on a powerful running game. RB Anthony Dixon was State's workhorse, finishing with 29 carries for 103 yards, while Christian Ducré contributed 63 yards on ten carries in addition to the game-winning touchdown for the Bulldogs.

Bulldogs' P Blake McAdams quietly posted an impressive performance by punting 6 times for an average of 43.3 yards, including a booming career-best 73-yard kick.

Five different Bulldog players recovered each of Auburn's turnovers: DE Jimmie Holmes and DT Kyle Love both recovered fumbles, while CB Anthony Johnson, SS Demario Bobo and FS Derek Pegues each intercepted AU passes. MSU LB Dominic Douglas again led all tacklers for the second time in his young (three-game) MSU career, with nine total.

After their slow 1–2 start, Auburn won their next four games, finished the season 9–4 by defeating Clemson in the Chick-fil-A Bowl, and were ranked 14th in the country in the final Coaches poll.

Scoring summary

| Quarter | Time | Drive | | | Team | Scoring information | Score | |
| Quarter | Time | Plays | Yards | TOP | Team | Scoring information | MSU | AU |
|---|---|---|---|---|---|---|---|---|
| 1 | 9:19 | | 12-58 | 5:41 | MSU | 32-yard field goal by Adam Carlson | 3 | 0 |
| 1 | 8:34 | | -- | -- | MSU | Interception returned 20 yards for touchdown by Derek Pegues, Adam Carlson kick good | 10 | 0 |
| 2 | 12:27 | | 12-54 | 4:29 | MSU | 30-yard field goal by Adam Carlson | 13 | 0 |
| 2 | 4:18 | | 5-54 | 2:45 | AU | Ben Tate 28-yard touchdown run, Wes Byrum kick good | 13 | 7 |
| 2 | :30 | | 7-30 | 3:42 | AU | Kodi Burns 1-yard touchdown run, Wes Byrum kick good | 13 | 14 |
| 4 | 5:27 | | 10-44 | 5:15 | MSU | Christian Ducré 5-yard touchdown run, 2-point pass no good | 19 | 14 |
| "TOP" = time of possession. For other American football terms, see Glossary of American football. | | | | | | | 19 | 14 |

=== Gardner–Webb ===
Last Meeting: First Meeting

| Team | 1 | 2 | 3 | 4 | Total |
|---|---|---|---|---|---|
| Runnin' Bulldogs (5–6, 2–2) | 0 | 0 | 6 | 9 | 15 |
| • Bulldogs (3–1, 1–1) | 14 | 14 | 3 | 0 | 31 |

- Date: September 22, 2007
- Location: Davis Wade Stadium, Starkville, Mississippi
- Game start: 6:00 p.m. CST
- Game attendance: 43,272
- Game weather: 65F Party Cloudy

Scoring summary

| Quarter | Time | Drive | | | Team | Scoring information | Score | |
| Quarter | Time | Plays | Yards | TOP | Team | Scoring information | GWU | MSU |
|---|---|---|---|---|---|---|---|---|
| 1 | 10:02 | | 10-68 | 4:58 | MSU | Anthony Dixon 9-yard touchdown run, Adam Carlson kick good | 0 | 7 |
| 1 | 7:55 | | -- | -- | MSU | Interception returned 60 yards for touchdown by De'Mon Glanton, Adam Carlson kick good | 0 | 14 |
| 2 | 2:42 | | 8-58 | 2:58 | MSU | Anthony Dixon 12-yard touchdown run, Adam Carlson kick good | 0 | 21 |
| 2 | 1:18 | | 1-30 | :06 | MSU | Tony Burks 30-yard touchdown reception from Josh Riddell, Adam Carlson kick good | 0 | 28 |
| 3 | 10:43 | | 10-63 | 4:11 | GWU | 33-yard field goal by Evan Kay | 3 | 28 |
| 3 | 7:19 | | 8-59 | 3:17 | MSU | 33-yard field goal by Adam Carlson | 3 | 31 |
| 3 | 4:34 | | 9-70 | 2:40 | GWU | 20-yard field goal by Evan Kay | 6 | 31 |
| 4 | 12:21 | | 10-80 | 3:39 | GWU | Phillip Peoples 6-yard touchdown run, 2-point pass no good | 12 | 31 |
| 4 | 6:10 | | 10-75 | 2:53 | GWU | 28-yard field goal by Evan Kay | 15 | 31 |
| "TOP" = time of possession. For other American football terms, see Glossary of American football. | | | | | | | 15 | 31 |

=== South Carolina ===
| Team | 1 | 2 | 3 | 4 | Total |
|---|---|---|---|---|---|
| Bulldogs (3–2, 1–2) | 7 | 7 | 7 | 0 | 21 |
| • #16 Gamecocks (6–6, 3–5) | 7 | 10 | 7 | 14 | 38 |

- Date: September 29, 2007
- Location: Williams-Brice Stadium, Columbia, South Carolina
- Game start: 11:00 a.m. CST
- Game attendance: 78,883
- Game weather: 71F Clear Skies

Scoring summary

| Quarter | Time | Drive | | | Team | Scoring information | Score | |
| Quarter | Time | Plays | Yards | TOP | Team | Scoring information | MSU | USC |
|---|---|---|---|---|---|---|---|---|
| 1 | 10:22 | | 12-69 | 4:38 | USC | Mike Davis 3-yard touchdown run, Ryan Succop kick good | 0 | 7 |
| 1 | 5:17 | | 2-31 | :50 | MSU | Aubrey Bell 28-yard touchdown reception from Josh Riddell, Adam Carlson kick good | 7 | 7 |
| 2 | 13:28 | | 4-37 | 1:52 | USC | Kenny McKinley 28-yard touchdown reception from Chris Smelley, Ryan Succop kick good | 7 | 14 |
| 2 | 2:20 | | 14-62 | 7:00 | MSU | Anthony Dixon 1-yard touchdown run, Adam Carlson kick good | 14 | 14 |
| 2 | :02 | | 10-54 | 2:18 | USC | 45-yard field goal by Ryan Succop | 14 | 17 |
| 3 | 8:56 | | 5-48 | 1:43 | MSU | Anthony Dixon 2-yard touchdown run, Adam Carlson kick good | 21 | 17 |
| 3 | 3:43 | | 1-27 | :08 | USC | Kenny McKinley 27-yard touchdown reception from Chris Smelley, Ryan Succop kick good | 21 | 24 |
| 4 | 14:07 | | 5-79 | 2:34 | USC | Mike Davis 2-yard touchdown run, Ryan Succop kick good | 21 | 31 |
| 4 | :58 | | 6-63 | 2:24 | USC | Mike Davis 12-yard touchdown run, Ryan Succop kick good | 21 | 38 |
| "TOP" = time of possession. For other American football terms, see Glossary of American football. | | | | | | | 21 | 38 |

=== UAB ===
| Team | 1 | 2 | 3 | 4 | Total |
|---|---|---|---|---|---|
| Blazers (2–10, 1–7) | 0 | 10 | 3 | 0 | 13 |
| • Bulldogs (4–2, 1–2) | 0 | 3 | 6 | 21 | 30 |

- Date: October 6, 2007
- Location: Davis Wade Stadium at Scott Field, Starkville, Mississippi
- Game start: 1:30 p.m. CST
- Game attendance: 45,259
- Game weather: 69F Partly Cloudy

Scoring summary

| Quarter | Time | Drive | | | Team | Scoring information | Score | |
| Quarter | Time | Plays | Yards | TOP | Team | Scoring information | UAB | MSU |
|---|---|---|---|---|---|---|---|---|
| 2 | 14:08 | | 6-30 | 2:00 | UAB | 42-yard field goal by Swayze Waters | 3 | 0 |
| 2 | 10:01 | | 5-23 | 1:53 | MSU | 39-yard field goal by Adam Carlson | 3 | 3 |
| 2 | 3:12 | | 13-87 | 6:41 | UAB | Frantrell Forrest 31-yard touchdown reception from Sam Hunt, Swayze Waters kick good | 10 | 3 |
| 3 | 5:46 | | 17-75 | 9:06 | MSU | Anthony Dixon 1-yard touchdown run, Adam Carlson kick no good | 10 | 9 |
| 3 | 2:24 | | 8-69 | 3:15 | UAB | 29-yard field goal by Swayze Waters | 13 | 9 |
| 4 | 8:00 | | 11-80 | 5:18 | MSU | Anthony Dixon 10-yard touchdown run, Adam Carlson kick good | 13 | 16 |
| 4 | 2:03 | | 9-60 | 3:52 | MSU | Anthony Dixon 12-yard touchdown run, Adam Carlson kick good | 13 | 23 |
| 4 | 1:49 | | -- | -- | MSU | Interception returned 30 yards for touchdown by Anthony Johnson, Adam Carlson kick good | 13 | 30 |
| "TOP" = time of possession. For other American football terms, see Glossary of American football. | | | | | | | 13 | 30 |

=== Tennessee ===
| Team | 1 | 2 | 3 | 4 | Total |
|---|---|---|---|---|---|
| • #25 Volunteers (10–4, 6–2) | 7 | 10 | 10 | 6 | 33 |
| Bulldogs (4–3, 1–3) | 7 | 7 | 7 | 0 | 21 |

- Date: October 13, 2007
- Location: Davis Wade Stadium, Starkville, Mississippi
- Game start: 1:30 p.m. CST
- Game attendance: 50,217
- Game weather: 66F Fair Skies

Scoring summary

| Quarter | Time | Drive | | | Team | Scoring information | Score | |
| Quarter | Time | Plays | Yards | TOP | Team | Scoring information | TENN | MSU |
|---|---|---|---|---|---|---|---|---|
| 1 | 9:05 | | 9-78 | 2:53 | TENN | Chris Brown 4-yard touchdown reception from Erik Ainge, Daniel Lincoln kick good | 7 | 0 |
| 1 | 5:21 | | 3-38 | :50 | MSU | Tony Burks 38-yard touchdown reception from Wesley Carroll, Adam Carlson kick good | 7 | 7 |
| 2 | 14:52 | | 8-76 | 3:10 | MSU | Anthony Dixon 30-yard touchdown run, Adam Carlson kick good | 7 | 14 |
| 2 | 8:05 | | 5-78 | 1:56 | TENN | Lucas Taylor 51-yard touchdown reception from Erik Ainge, Daniel Lincoln kick good | 14 | 14 |
| 2 | :02 | | 3-26 | :18 | TENN | 47-yard field goal by Daniel Lincoln | 17 | 14 |
| 3 | 12:12 | | 9-67 | 2:41 | TENN | Arian Foster 1-yard touchdown run, Daniel Lincoln kick good | 24 | 14 |
| 3 | 8:21 | | 8-62 | 3:43 | MSU | Jamayel Smith 14-yard touchdown reception from Wesley Carroll, Adam Carlson kick good | 24 | 21 |
| 3 | 3:47 | | 12-70 | 4:30 | TENN | 29-yard field goal by Daniel Lincoln | 27 | 21 |
| 4 | 5:45 | | 14-69 | 5:42 | TENN | 26-yard field goal by Daniel Lincoln | 30 | 21 |
| 4 | 2:32 | | 5-16 | 2:01 | TENN | 43-yard field goal by Daniel Lincoln | 33 | 21 |
| "TOP" = time of possession. For other American football terms, see Glossary of American football. | | | | | | | 33 | 21 |

=== West Virginia ===
| Team | 1 | 2 | 3 | 4 | Total |
|---|---|---|---|---|---|
| Bulldogs (4–4, 1–3) | 0 | 7 | 6 | 0 | 13 |
| • #9 Mountaineers (11–2, 5–2) | 28 | 3 | 0 | 7 | 38 |

- Date: October 20, 2007
- Location: Mountaineer Field, Morgantown, West Virginia
- Game start: 2:30 p.m. CST
- Game attendance: 61,022
- Game weather: 53F Partly Cloudy

Scoring summary

| Quarter | Time | Drive | | | Team | Scoring information | Score | |
| Quarter | Time | Plays | Yards | TOP | Team | Scoring information | MSU | WVU |
|---|---|---|---|---|---|---|---|---|
| 1 | 14:39 | | 1-64 | :21 | WVU | Pat White 64-yard touchdown run, Pat McAfee kick good | 0 | 7 |
| 1 | 7:46 | | 12-88 | 5:41 | WVU | Owen Schmitt 12-yard touchdown reception from Pat White, Pat McAfee kick good | 0 | 14 |
| 1 | 6:09 | | 3-16 | 1:13 | WVU | Darius Reynaud 10-yard touchdown reception from Pat White, Pat McAfee kick good | 0 | 21 |
| 1 | 2:20 | | 5-48 | 1:37 | WVU | Steve Slaton 26-yard touchdown run, Pat McAfee kick good | 0 | 28 |
| 2 | 14:54 | | 4-5 | 1:32 | WVU | 42-yard field goal by Pat McAfee | 0 | 31 |
| 2 | 3:51 | | 5-29 | 2:32 | MSU | Anthony Dixon 1-yard touchdown run, Adam Carlson kick good | 7 | 31 |
| 3 | 9:50 | | 13-58 | 5:10 | MSU | Christian Ducré 3-yard touchdown run, 2-point pass no good | 13 | 31 |
| 4 | 14:19 | | 7-48 | 1:44 | WVU | Darius Reynaud 13-yard touchdown reception from Jarrett Brown, Pat McAfee kick good | 13 | 38 |
| "TOP" = time of possession. For other American football terms, see Glossary of American football. | | | | | | | 13 | 38 |

=== Kentucky ===
| Team | 1 | 2 | 3 | 4 | Total |
|---|---|---|---|---|---|
| • Bulldogs (5–4, 2–3) | 7 | 7 | 10 | 7 | 31 |
| #14 Wildcats (8–5, 3–5) | 7 | 0 | 7 | 0 | 14 |

- Date: October 27, 2007
- Location: Commonwealth Stadium, Lexington, Kentucky
- Game start: 11:30 a.m. CST
- Game attendance: 68,173
- Game weather: 39F Cloudy Skies

Scoring summary

| Quarter | Time | Drive | | | Team | Scoring information | Score | |
| Quarter | Time | Plays | Yards | TOP | Team | Scoring information | MSU | UK |
|---|---|---|---|---|---|---|---|---|
| 1 | 9:08 | | 14-80 | 5:52 | MSU | Jason Husband 11-yard touchdown reception from Wesley Carroll, Adam Carlson kick good | 7 | 0 |
| 1 | 5:17 | | 9-73 | 3:45 | UK | Stevie Johnson 18-yard touchdown reception from André Woodson, Lones Seiber kick good | 7 | 7 |
| 2 | 13:36 | | 17-80 | 6:41 | MSU | Anthony Dixon 1-yard touchdown reception from Wesley Carroll, Adam Carlson kick good | 14 | 7 |
| 3 | 12:27 | | 7-19 | 2:33 | MSU | 31-yard field goal by Adam Carlson | 17 | 7 |
| 3 | 8:16 | | 5-26 | 1:58 | MSU | Anthony Dixon 1-yard touchdown run, Adam Carlson kick good | 24 | 7 |
| 3 | 5:15 | | 6-63 | 2:53 | UK | Stevie Johnson 37-yard touchdown reception from André Woodson, Lones Seiber kick good | 24 | 14 |
| 4 | 8:15 | | 2-39 | :53 | MSU | Christian Ducré 34-yard touchdown run, Adam Carlson kick good | 31 | 14 |
| "TOP" = time of possession. For other American football terms, see Glossary of American football. | | | | | | | 31 | 14 |

=== Alabama ===
| Team | 1 | 2 | 3 | 4 | Total |
|---|---|---|---|---|---|
| #21 Crimson Tide (7–6, 4–4) | 6 | 3 | 0 | 3 | 12 |
| • Bulldogs (6–4, 3–3) | 0 | 10 | 7 | 0 | 17 |

- Date: November 10, 2007
- Location: Davis Wade Stadium, Starkville, Mississippi
- Game start: 11:30 a.m. CST
- Game attendance: 56,188
- Game weather: 52F Clear and Windy

Scoring summary

| Quarter | Time | Drive | | | Team | Scoring information | Score | |
| Quarter | Time | Plays | Yards | TOP | Team | Scoring information | ALA | MSU |
|---|---|---|---|---|---|---|---|---|
| 1 | 12:00 | | 6-12 | 1:24 | ALA | 39-yard field goal by Leigh Tiffin | 3 | 0 |
| 1 | 8:25 | | 5-25 | 2:29 | ALA | 51-yard field goal by Leigh Tiffin | 6 | 0 |
| 2 | 8:39 | | 10-52 | 4:42 | ALA | 29-yard field goal by Leigh Tiffin | 9 | 0 |
| 2 | 4:12 | | 11-52 | 4:24 | MSU | 35-yard field goal by Adam Carlson | 9 | 3 |
| 2 | :04 | | -- | -- | MSU | Interception returned 100 yards for touchdown by Anthony Johnson, Adam Carlson kick good | 9 | 10 |
| 3 | 11:35 | | 5-25 | 1:40 | MSU | Anthony Dixon 3-yard touchdown run, Adam Carlson kick good | 9 | 17 |
| 4 | 6:47 | | 10-44 | 3:58 | ALA | 50-yard field goal by Leigh Tiffin | 12 | 17 |
| "TOP" = time of possession. For other American football terms, see Glossary of American football. | | | | | | | 12 | 17 |

=== Arkansas ===
| Team | 1 | 2 | 3 | 4 | Total |
|---|---|---|---|---|---|
| Bulldogs (6–5, 3–4) | 7 | 0 | 10 | 14 | 31 |
| • Razorbacks (8–5, 4–4) | 0 | 24 | 7 | 14 | 45 |

- Date: November 17, 2007
- Location: War Memorial Stadium, Little Rock, Arkansas
- Game start: 1:00 p.m. CST
- Game attendance: 55,185
- Game weather: 47F Mostly Cloudy

Scoring summary

| Quarter | Time | Drive | | | Team | Scoring information | Score | |
| Quarter | Time | Plays | Yards | TOP | Team | Scoring information | MSU | ARK |
|---|---|---|---|---|---|---|---|---|
| 1 | 3:58 | | 15-80 | 6:25 | MSU | Jamayel Smith 4-yard touchdown reception from Wesley Carroll, Adam Carlson kick good | 7 | 0 |
| 2 | 14:55 | | 9-45 | 4:03 | ARK | 39-yard field goal by Alex Tejada | 7 | 3 |
| 2 | 10:44 | | 7-79 | 2:36 | ARK | Farod Jackson 30-yard touchdown reception from Casey Dick, Alex Tejada kick good | 7 | 10 |
| 2 | 5:01 | | 1-35 | :08 | ARK | Robert Johnson 35-yard touchdown reception from Casey Dick, Alex Tejada kick good | 7 | 17 |
| 2 | :43 | | 6-55 | 2:01 | ARK | Marcus Monk 19-yard touchdown reception from Casey Dick, Alex Tejada kick good | 7 | 24 |
| 3 | 10:20 | | 9-60 | 2:58 | MSU | 25-yard field goal by Adam Carlson | 10 | 24 |
| 3 | 09:33 | | 2-67 | :47 | ARK | Darren McFadden 57-yard touchdown reception from Casey Dick, Alex Tejada kick good | 10 | 31 |
| 3 | 3:17 | | 1-35 | :07 | MSU | Tony Burks 35-yard touchdown reception from Wesley Carroll, Adam Carlson kick good | 17 | 31 |
| 4 | 9:44 | | 8-79 | 3:04 | ARK | Robert Johnson 24-yard touchdown reception from Darren McFadden, Alex Tejada kick good | 17 | 38 |
| 4 | 9:26 | | 2-80 | :18 | MSU | Jamayel Smith 80-yard touchdown reception from Wesley Carroll, Adam Carlson kick good | 24 | 38 |
| 4 | 6:48 | | -- | -- | ARK | Interception returned 30 yards for touchdown by Antwain Robinson, Alex Tejada kick good | 24 | 45 |
| 4 | 5:00 | | 9-60 | 1:48 | MSU | Jason Husband 19-yard touchdown reception from Wesley Carroll, Adam Carlson kick good | 31 | 45 |
| "TOP" = time of possession. For other American football terms, see Glossary of American football. | | | | | | | 31 | 45 |

=== Ole Miss ===
| Team | 1 | 2 | 3 | 4 | Total |
|---|---|---|---|---|---|
| Rebels (3–9, 0–8) | 7 | 0 | 7 | 0 | 14 |
| • Bulldogs (7–5, 4–4) | 0 | 0 | 0 | 17 | 17 |

- Date: November 23, 2007
- Location: Davis Wade Stadium, Starkville, Mississippi
- Game start: 11:30 a.m. CST
- Game attendance: 51,727
- Game weather: 33F Clear Skies

Scoring summary

| Quarter | Time | Drive | | | Team | Scoring information | Score | |
| Quarter | Time | Plays | Yards | TOP | Team | Scoring information | MISS | MSU |
|---|---|---|---|---|---|---|---|---|
| 1 | 10:18 | | 12-75 | 4:42 | MISS | BenJarvus Green-Ellis 14-yard touchdown run, Joshua Shene kick good | 7 | 0 |
| 3 | 7:26 | | 12-62 | 5:48 | MISS | Shay Hodge 13-yard touchdown reception from Brent Schaeffer, Joshua Shene kick good | 14 | 0 |
| 4 | 7:51 | | 6-46 | 2:14 | MSU | Anthony Dixon 4-yard touchdown reception from Wesley Carroll, Adam Carlson kick good | 14 | 7 |
| 4 | 2:38 | | -- | -- | MSU | Derek Pegues 75-yard touchdown punt return, Adam Carlson kick good | 14 | 14 |
| 4 | :12 | | 6-34 | :31 | MSU | 48-yard field goal by Adam Carlson | 14 | 17 |
| "TOP" = time of possession. For other American football terms, see Glossary of American football. | | | | | | | 14 | 17 |

=== UCF—Liberty Bowl ===
2007 AutoZone Liberty Bowl
| UCF Knights | Mississippi State Bulldogs |
| (10–3, 7–1) | (7–5, 4–4) |
| 3 | 10 |
| Head coach: George O'Leary | Head coach: Sylvester Croom |
| | 1 | 2 | 3 | 4 | Total |
|---|---|---|---|---|---|
| UCF | 0 | 3 | 0 | 0 | 3 |
| Mississippi State | 0 | 3 | 0 | 7 | 10 |
- Date: December 29, 2007
- Season: 2007
- Stadium: Liberty Bowl Memorial Stadium
- Location: Memphis, Tennessee
- MVP: Derek Pegues, FS, Mississippi State
- Favorite: UCF by 3
- National anthem: Kallen Esperian
- Referee: Sun Belt officiating crew
- Halftime show: Taylor Hicks
- Attendance: 63,816

United States TV coverage
- Network: ESPN
- Announcers: Terry Gannon, David Norrie

Scoring summary

| Quarter | Time | Drive | | | Team | Scoring information | Score | |
| Quarter | Time | Plays | Yards | TOP | Team | Scoring information | UCF | MSU |
|---|---|---|---|---|---|---|---|---|
| 2 | 11:49 | | 5-18 | 1:43 | UCF | 45-yard field goal by Michael Torres | 3 | 0 |
| 2 | 6:02 | | 4-1 | 1:37 | MSU | 22-yard field goal by Adam Carlson | 3 | 3 |
| 4 | 1:54 | | 10-59 | 3:53 | MSU | Anthony Dixon 1-yard touchdown run, Adam Carlson kick good | 3 | 10 |
| "TOP" = time of possession. For other American football terms, see Glossary of American football. | | | | | | | 3 | 10 |

== Personnel ==
=== Coaching staff ===
| Name | Responsibility | Position Group | Year | Alma mater |
|---|---|---|---|---|
| Sylvester Croom | Head coach | | 4th | University of Alabama (1975) |
| Woody McCorvey | Asst. Head Coach, Offensive Coordinator | Quarterbacks | 4th | Alabama State University (1972) |
| Ellis Johnson | Defensive Coordinator | Linebackers | 4th | The Citadel (1975) |
| Reed Stringer | Special Teams Coordinator | Tight Ends | 5th | Delta State University (2001) |
| Rocky Felker | Recruiting Coordinator | Running Backs | 6th | Mississippi State University (1972) |
| J.B. Grimes | | Offensive Linemen | 4th | Henderson State University (1977) |
| Charlie Harbison | | Safeties | 1st | Gardner–Webb University (1995) |
| David Turner | | Defensive Linemen | 1st | Davidson College (1985) |
| Melvin Smith | | Cornerbacks | 2nd | Millsaps College (1982) |
| Pat Washington | | Wide Receivers | 1st | Auburn University (1987) |
| Ben Pollard | Head Strength & Conditioning Coach | | 1st | Texas Tech University (1984) |

=== Roster ===
| # | Name | Height | Weight | Class | Position | Hometown | Previous School(s) |
|---|---|---|---|---|---|---|---|
| 1 | Keith Fitzhugh | 5'11" | 206 lbs. | Jr. | S | Hampton, Georgia | Lovejoy HS |
| 2 | (redshirt) Robert Elliot | 6' | 192 lbs. | Fr. | RB | Okolona, Mississippi | Okolona HS |
| 3 | Derek Pegues | 5'10" | 196 lbs. | Jr. | S | Batesville, Mississippi | South Panola HS |
| 4 | Tony Burks | 6'4" | 217 lbs. | Sr. | WR | Gulfport, Mississippi | Harrison Central HS, Miss. Gulf Coast CC |
| 5 | Gabe O'Neal | 6'1" | 220 lbs. | Sr. | LB | Columbus, Mississippi | Columbus HS |
| 6 | Demario Bobo | 6' | 180 lbs. | Jr. | S | Courtland, Mississippi | South Panola HS |
| 7 | Michael Henig | 6'1" | 195 lbs. | Jr. | QB | Montgomery, Alabama | Jefferson Davis HS |
| 8 | De'Mon Glanton | 6'1" | 190 lbs. | Jr. | S | Atlanta | Mays HS |
| 9 | Keon Humphries | 5'10" | 180 lbs. | Jr. | CB | Montgomery, Alabama | Lanier HS |
| 10 | Dominic Douglas | 6'2" | 227 lbs. | Jr. | LB | Clinton, Mississippi | Clinton HS, Hinds CC |
| 11 | Anthony Johnson | 5'10" | 194 lbs. | So. | CB | Jackson, Mississippi | Provine HS, Hargrave Military Academy |
| 13 | Wesley Carroll | 6'1" | 190 lbs. | Fr. | QB | Ft. Lauderdale, Florida | St. Thomas Aquinas HS |
| 14 | (redshirt) Chris Relf | 6'3" | 211 lbs. | Fr. | QB | Montgomery, Alabama | Carver HS |
| 15 | Co-Eric Riley | 6'1" | 200 lbs. | Jr. | WR | Lucedale, Mississippi | George County HS, Miss. Gulf Coast CC |
| 16 | Zack Harrington | 6' | 185 lbs. | So. | QB | Hattiesburg, Mississippi | Oak Grove HS, Southeastern Louisiana |
| 17 | Josh Riddell | 6'1" | 195 lbs. | Jr. | QB | Salem, Oregon | McKay HS, Foothill CC |
| 18 | Marcus Washington | 5'10" | 180 lbs. | So. | CB | Missouri City, Texas | Marshall HS |
| 19 | Anthony Summers | 6'2" | 188 lbs. | So. | S | Olive Branch, Mississippi | Olive Branch HS |
| 20 | (redshirt) Wade Bonner | 5'10" | 180 lbs. | Fr. | CB | Mason, Tennessee | Fayette-Ware HS |
| 22 | Jamar Chaney | 6'1" | 236 lbs. | Jr. | LB | Ft. Pierce, Florida | St. Lucie West Centennial HS |
| 23 | Jasper O'Quinn | 5'10" | 185 lbs. | Jr. | CB | Bude, Mississippi | Franklin County HS |
| 24 | Anthony Dixon | 6'1" | 240 lbs. | So. | RB | Jackson, Mississippi | Terry HS |
| 25 | Tyler Threadgill | 5'10" | 190 lbs. | Sr. | WR | Philadelphia, Mississippi | Philadelphia HS |
| 26 | (redshirt) Damein Anderson | 5'11" | 175 lbs. | Fr. | CB | Hazlehurst, Mississippi | Hazlehurst HS |
| 26 | Jarvis Williams | 5'11" | 170 lbs. | So. | CB | Jackson, Mississippi | Provine HS |
| 27 | Jarvis Kyles | 6' | 185 lbs. | So. | CB | Milledgeville, Georgia | Baldwin HS |
| 28 | Tay Bowser | 6'3" | 185 lbs. | So. | CB | Gilmer, Texas | Gilmer HS |
| 29 | Christian Ducré | 6' | 222 lbs. | So. | RB | Mandeville, Louisiana | Fontainebleau HS, Tulane University |
| 30 | Arnil Stallworth | 5'10" | 200 lbs. | So. | RB | Daphne, Alabama | Daphne HS |
| 31 | (redshirt) Jamie Jones | 6' | 215 lbs. | Fr. | LB | Springdale, Arkansas | Springdale HS |
| 32 | (redshirt) Marcus Green | 6'2" | 230 lbs. | Fr. | RB | Scooba, Mississippi | Kemper County HS |
| 33 | Justin Williams | 5'10" | 207 lbs. | Sr. | RB | Tallulah, Louisiana | McCall HS, Grambling State University |
| 34 | K.J. Wright | 6'3" | 215 lbs. | Fr. | LB | Olive Branch, Mississippi | Olive Branch HS |
| 35 | Brandon Hart | 5'11" | 240 lbs. | Jr. | FB | LaGrange, Georgia | Troup County HS |
| 36 | Jamon Hughes | 6' | 230 lbs. | So. | LB | Rolling Fork, Mississippi | Humphreys County HS |
| 37 | Adam Carlson | 6'4" | 195 lbs. | Jr. | K | Gulfport, Mississippi | Gulfport HS |
| 38 | Eric Hoskins | 5'11" | 230 lbs. | Jr. | FB | Weir, Mississippi | Weir HS, Holmes CC |
| 39 | Tim Bailey | 6'3" | 241 lbs. | Jr. | DE | Glen Allan, Mississippi | Riverside HS, Miss. Delta CC |
| 40 | Chris Nance | 5'10" | 182 lbs. | Jr. | CB | Tuscumbia, Alabama | Deshler HS, Northeast Miss. CC |
| 41 | Brad Moore | 6'1" | 190 lbs. | RS Fr. | K | Starkville, Mississippi | Starkville Academy |
| 41 | (redshirt) Eric Richards | 6'4" | 227 lbs. | Fr. | K | Vicksburg, Mississippi | Warren Central HS |
| 42 | Zach Smith | 6' | 180 lbs. | Fr. | S | Altoona, Alabama | Susan Moore HS |
| 43 | Blake McAdams | 5'10" | 190 lbs. | Jr. | P | Ripley, Tennessee | Ripley HS |
| 44 | Emmanuel Gatling | 6'2" | 200 lbs. | RS Fr. | S | McAllen, Texas | Rowe HS |
| 44 | (redshirt) Ethan Stockett | 6'1" | 255 lbs. | Fr. | FB | Ft. Smith, Arkansas | Southside HS |
| 45 | Ben Shelton | 5'11" | 196 lbs. | Sr. | WR | Vicksburg, Mississippi | Vicksburg HS, Hinds CC |
| 46 | Aaron Feld | 6'1" | 225 lbs. | RS Fr. | LS | Homewood, Alabama | Homewood HS |
| 47 | Ryan Mason | 6'4" | 217 lbs. | Jr. | WR | Mobile, Alabama | Shaw HS, Miss. Delta CC |
| 48 | Dezmond Sherrod | 6'3" | 245 lbs. | Sr. | TE | Caledonia, Mississippi | Caledonia HS |
| 49 | (redshirt) Terrell Johnson | 6'2" | 210 lbs. | Fr. | LB | Silas, Alabama | Southern Choctaw County HS |
| 49 | Taurus Young | 5'8" | 228 lbs. | Jr. | RB | Kilmichael, Mississippi | Montgomery County HS |
| 50 | (redshirt) Devon Edwards | 6' | 217 lbs. | Fr. | LB | Coffeeville, Alabama | Coffee County HS, Georgia Military College |
| 51 | Avery Hannibal | 6'1" | 240 lbs. | Sr. | DE | LaGrange, Georgia | Troup County HS |
| 52 | Karlin Brown | 5'9" | 195 lbs. | Fr. | LB | Tallahassee, Florida | Lincoln HS |
| 53 | Anthony Strauder | 6'3" | 290 lbs. | Jr. | OG | Natchez, Mississippi | Natchez HS |
| 54 | Titus Brown | 6'3" | 250 lbs. | Sr. | DE | Tuscaloosa, Alabama | Hillcrest HS |
| 55 | (redshirt) Quentin Saulsberry | 6'3" | 286 lbs. | Fr. | DT | Coldwater, Mississippi | Independence HS |
| 56 | Anthony Littlejohn | 6'1" | 230 lbs. | Jr. | LB | Jacksonville, Florida | Englewood HS |
| 58 | Johnny Carpenter | 6'2" | 290 lbs. | So. | C | Citronelle, Alabama | Citronelle HS |
| 59 | Mark Brown | 5'11" | 225 lbs. | So. | LB | Madison, Mississippi | Madison Central HS |
| 60 | J.D. Hamilton | 6'4" | 300 lbs. | Sr. | OT | Natchez, Mississippi | Natchez HS, Copiah-Lincoln CC |
| 61 | Mark Lynn | 6' | 210 lbs. | RS Fr. | LB | Madison, Mississippi | Madison Central HS |
| 62 | (redshirt) Addison Lawrence | 6'4" | 265 lbs. | Fr. | OT | Coldwater, Mississippi | Magnolia Heights HS |
| 63 | Chris Spencer | 6'3" | 305 lbs. | So. | OG | Meridian, Mississippi | Meridian HS |
| 65 | Anthony Bowles | 5'11" | 220 lbs. | Jr. | LS | Grenada, Mississippi | Grenada HS |
| 66 | (redshirt) D.J. Looney | 6'1" | 290 lbs. | Fr. | C | Birmingham, Alabama | Oak Mountain HS |
| 67 | Roland Terry | 6'7" | 298 lbs. | Jr. | OT | Meridian, Mississippi | Lamar Christian HS |
| 68 | Russell Jackson | 6'2" | 238 lbs. | So. | DE | Athens, Alabama | Athens HS |
| 70 | J.C. Brignone | 6'1" | 290 lbs. | RS Fr. | OG | Pass Christian, Mississippi | St. Stanislaus College HS |
| 72 | John McMillan | 6'2" | 285 lbs. | RS Fr. | OG | Paragould, Arkansas | Paragould HS |
| 73 | (redshirt) Dakota Merritt | 6'5" | 302 lbs. | Fr. | OT | Cantonment, Florida | West Florida Tech HS |
| 74 | Mark Melichar | 6'5" | 290 lbs. | RS Fr. | OT | Birmingham, Alabama | Oak Mountain HS |
| 75 | Craig Jenkins | 6'4" | 315 lbs. | So. | OG | Pearl, Mississippi | Pearl HS |
| 76 | Royce Blackledge | 6'4" | 293 lbs. | Sr. | C | Sandersville, Mississippi | Northeast Jones County HS |
| 77 | Michael Brown | 6'5" | 300 lbs. | Jr. | OT | College Park, Georgia | Westlake HS, University of Florida |
| 78 | Michael Gates | 6'4" | 305 lbs. | Jr. | OG | Fairburn, Georgia | Sandy Creek HS |
| 79 | Derek Sherrod | 6'5" | 298 lbs. | Fr. | OT | Caledonia, Mississippi | Caledonia HS |
| 80 | Alex Carpenter | 6' | 182 lbs. | RS Fr. | WR | Biggersville, Mississippi | Biggersville HS |
| 81 | Brandon McRae | 6'4" | 200 lbs. | So. | WR | Chester, Virginia | Monacan HS, Hargrave Military Academy, Morehead State University |
| 82 | Jason Husband | 6'3" | 230 lbs. | Sr. | TE | Jackson, Mississippi | Jim Hill HS |
| 83 | Austin Wilbanks | 6'3" | 245 lbs. | So. | TE | Forest, Mississippi | Forest HS, Mississippi College |
| 84 | Jeremy Jones | 6'2" | 275 lbs. | Jr. | FB | Harvey, Louisiana | West Jefferson Parish HS |
| 85 | Brandon Henderson | 6'1" | 250 lbs. | RS Fr. | TE | Fayetteville, Georgia | Fayette County HS |
| 86 | Lance Long | 5'11" | 186 lbs. | Sr. | WR | Macomb, Michigan | Eisenhower HS, University of Toledo |
| 87 | Aubrey Bell | 6'3" | 217 lbs. | Jr. | WR | Prichard, Alabama | Blount HS |
| 88 | Eric Butler | 6'3" | 255 lbs. | Sr. | TE | Moss Point, Mississippi | Moss Point HS |
| 89 | Jamayel Smith | 6' | 183 lbs. | Jr. | WR | East Point, Georgia | Riverwood HS, Hargrave Military Academy |
| 90 | Cortez McCraney | 6'4" | 272 lbs. | Jr. | DT | Southaven, Mississippi | Southaven HS, University of Memphis |
| 91 | Rodney Prince | 6'3" | 252 lbs. | RS Fr. | DE | Irondale, Alabama | Shades Valley HS |
| 92 | (redshirt) Charles Burns | 6'3" | 265 lbs. | Jr. | DE | Hattiesburg, Mississippi | Hattiesburg HS |
| 93 | Brandon Cooper | 6'3" | 240 lbs. | RS Fr. | DE | Missouri City, Texas | Marshall HS |
| 94 | Jessie Bowman | 6'1" | 305 lbs. | Jr. | DT | Brookhaven, Mississippi | Brookhaven HS, Copiah-Lincoln CC |
| 95 | Kyle Love | 6'1" | 312 lbs. | So. | DT | Fairburn, Georgia | North Clayton County HS |
| 96 | Reggie Odom | 6' | 295 lbs. | RS Fr. | DT | DeLand, Florida | DeLand HS |
| 97 | Jimmie Holmes | 6'3" | 235 lbs. | Jr. | DE | Aiken, South Carolina | Aiken HS, Miss. Delta CC |
| 98 | LaMarcus Williams | 6'1" | 290 lbs. | Fr. | DT | Bastrop, Louisiana | Bastrop HS |
| 99 | Quinton Wesley | 6'4" | 315 lbs. | So. | DT | Atlanta | Crim HS |
| | Robert Ambers | 5'11" | 181 lbs. | So. | QB | Venice, California | Venice HS |
| | Andrew Ellard | 5'11" | 180 lbs. | So. | WR | Natchez, Mississippi | Cathedral HS |
| | (redshirt) Robert Gurley | 6'2" | 190 lbs. | Fr. | S | Dothan, Alabama | Houston Academy |
| | (redshirt) Josh Hines | 5'11" | 215 lbs. | Fr. | LB | Rome, Georgia | Rome HS |
| | (redshirt) Cole Richardson | 5'11" | 180 lbs. | Fr. | P | Hattiesburg, Mississippi | Oak Grove HS |
| | Major Sosebee | 6'2" | 185 lbs. | So. | WR | Warrior, Alabama | Sumiton Christian HS |
| | (redshirt) Kevin Valenti | 5'10" | 188 lbs. | Fr. | CB | Tampa, Florida | Jesuit HS |
| | Davonne Wilson | 6'3" | 220 lbs. | RS Fr. | DE | Smyrna, Georgia | Campbell HS |
| | (redshirt) Spencer Yates | 6'3" | 250 lbs. | Fr. | OG | Brandon, Mississippi | Northwest Rankin County HS |

- (redshirt) indicates players who are currently inactive during their redshirt season; Freshmen who are in their first season of active participation after redshirting are listed as "RS Fr."

== Awards and honors ==
| Recipient | Awards/Accolades |
|---|---|
| Michael Brown (OL) | All-SEC Second Team (Coaches) |
| Titus Brown (DL) | All-SEC Second Team (AP, Coaches) |
| Wesley Carroll (QB) | SEC All-Freshman Team (Coaches) |
| Jamar Chaney (LB) | All-SEC Second Team (Coaches) |
| Sylvester Croom (Coach) | SEC Coach of the Year (AP, Coaches) |
| Avery Hannibal (DL) | SEC Defensive Player of the Week (10/27) |
| Anthony Johnson (DB) | SEC Defensive Player of the Week (11/10) |
| Gabe O'Neal (LB) | SEC Defensive Player of the Week (9/8) |
| Derek Pegues (DB) | All-SEC First Team (AP); All-SEC Second Team (Coaches); SEC Defensive Player of the Week (9/15) |
| Anthony Strauder (OL) | SEC Good Works Team |
