= Derek Pegues =

American football player (born 1986)

No. 4
- Position: Defensive back

Personal information
- Born: September 14, 1986 (age 40); Batesville, Mississippi, U.S.
- Listed height: 5 ft 9 in (1.75 m)
- Listed weight: 193 lb (88 kg)

Career information
- High school: South Panola (Batesville, Mississippi)
- College: Mississippi State (2005–2008)
- NFL draft: 2009: undrafted

Career history
- Chicago Bears (2009)*; Saskatchewan Roughriders (2011)*; Iowa Barnstormers (2012)
- * Offseason or practice squad member only

Awards and highlights
- First-team All-SEC (2007); 2× Second-team All-SEC (2006, 2008)
- Stats at ArenaFan.com

Derek Alan Pegues (born September 14, 1986) is an American former football defensive back.

== Personal ==
He is the cousin of former NFL Linebacker Dwayne Rudd. Pegues attended the same high school as Rudd, South Panola, which also produced former Pittsburgh Steelers starting Cornerback Deshea Townsend, Rudd's teammate in high school and college, at the University of Alabama.

== High school career ==
=== 2002 (Sophomore) ===
Pegues had an outstanding prep career at South Panola High School in Batesville, Mississippi. He started at Cornerback for the South Panola Tigers his sophomore season which saw the team go 14–1 with their only loss coming against Wayne County High School in the MHSAA Class 5A State Championship game, by a score of 21–14.

=== 2003 (Junior) ===
As a junior, Pegues was moved to Quarterback to replace departed starter Rickey Wright, who had signed a letter of intent to play football at Mississippi State. In his first season at the helm of the Tigers' offense as a junior (2003), Pegues guided the team to a 15–0 record, the Class 5A State Championship and a #9 national ranking from USA Today. South Panola routed previously unbeaten Oak Grove High School 33–14 in the 5A title game. Pegues received First-Team All-State recognition from the Clarion-Ledger newspaper along with teammates Jamarca Sanford and Peria Jerry, who went on to standout college careers at the University of Mississippi and played in the NFL.

=== 2004 (Senior) ===
As a senior, Pegues again guided the Tigers to a perfect season (15–0) in 2004 with a second consecutive 5A State Championship (the school's 4th) and another top-ten finish in USA Today's "Super 25" high school football rankings (#7). He was instrumental in the Tigers' 39–21 State Championship Game victory over Ocean Springs High School as he rushed for 244 yards and 5 touchdowns. No player before or since has scored 5 touchdowns in the Class 5A Championship Game. Pegues was again named First-Team All-State by the Clarion-Ledger, along with teammates Travis Sanford, a Wide receiver who signed with the Ole Miss Rebels, and John Jerry, currently a starting Offensive guard at Ole Miss. He finished his high school career with a total of 4,104 rushing yards and 86 total touchdowns (passing, rushing, receiving, kick and punt returns and interception returns).

Prior to his 2004 senior season, Rivals.com reported that Pegues could bench press an impressive 350 lb. and run a blazing 4.4-second 40-yard dash. These numbers affirmed his talent as indicated by his accomplishments on the field and helped him earn scholarship offers from such elite college football programs as Alabama, Michigan, Auburn, Tennessee and Louisiana State in addition to Mississippi State.

=== All Star Games ===
==== 2005 Army All-American Game ====
Pegues was selected to play in the 5th annual U.S. Army All-American Bowl in San Antonio, Texas on January 15, 2005. The game pits the nation's best high school seniors against one another in an East-vs.-West matchup. Pegues, a member of the West squad, was one of three Mississippians who played in the game, the most ever in the same year (the other two were Jerrell Powe, a former Ole Miss signee, and Josh McNeil, currently the starting Center for the Tennessee Volunteers). Powe, McNeil and Pegues joined a star-studded West line-up, including names like Travis Beckum, Jamaal Charles, DeSean Jackson, Rey Maualuga, Ryan Perriloux, Ryan Reynolds, Mark Sanchez, Reggie Smith, and Jonathan Stewart, helping the West claim the victory, 35–3.

Pegues' performance in the game was spectacular; he intercepted a pass, ran for a first down on a fake punt and wowed viewers by shutting down two of the nation's best players in East Wide receivers Fred Rouse and Patrick Turner, even though both players physically towered over his 5'10" frame at 6'3" and 6'5", respectively. His performance earned him "Defensive Player of the Game" honors.

==== 2005 Alabama-Mississippi Game ====
Later that year, Pegues would guide another team to an All-Star game victory. Pegues played Running back in the Alabama-Mississippi All-Star Football Classic, which annually pits the best players from each state against one another. The game was held at its annual location, Ladd–Peebles Stadium in Mobile, Alabama, on June 4, 2005 (formerly a summer contest, it has since been moved to December).

Pegues picked up 15 carries for 106 yards (7.1 average) and a touchdown in a 21–18 Mississippi victory. He was again joined by his fellow Mississippi teammates from the Army Game, Wayne County's Jerrell Powe and Collins High's Josh McNeil, as well as Brookhaven's Jimmy Johns, an Alabama signee who had beaten Pegues for the "Mr. Football" award annually bestowed upon the State's best player.

== College career ==
=== 2005 (Freshman) ===
Saw action in all 11 games as a reserve Cornerback on defense, where he accumulated 14 tackles, forced a fumble, broke up two passes and intercepted one. Was also a starting kick return specialist; ran back 28 kicks for and average of 20 yards, including a long of 51.

=== 2006 (Sophomore) ===
Started all 12 games at Cornerback on defense. Recorded 32 tackles, 1.5 tackles for a loss, five pass deflections and four interceptions. Also started all 12 games as a kick and punt return specialist. Returned 29 kickoffs an average of 23.7 yards, including a long of 61. Returned 25 punts for an average of 14 yards and one touchdown, including a long of 81. Was voted to the All-SEC Second Team by the SEC Coaches.

=== 2007 (Junior) ===
Started all 13 games at Free Safety on defense. Recorded 50 tackles, two tackles for a loss, recovered a fumble, deflected seven passes and intercepted five. His 20-yard interception return for a touchdown against Auburn was the difference in the game, which Mississippi State won for the first time since 2000. Also started all 13 games as a kick and punt return specialist. Returned 24 kickoffs an average of 22.7 yards, including a long of 51. Returned 27 punts for an average of 9.9 yards, including a long of 75, which resulted in a touchdown that tied the 2007 Egg Bowl in the fourth quarter, allowing MSU to win the game on a last-second field goal. Was voted to the All-SEC First Team by the Associated Press and Second Team by the SEC Coaches. He intercepted two passes on his way to an MVP performance in the 2007 AutoZone Liberty Bowl that helped his team win a defensive struggle over UCF by a score of 10–3.

=== 2008 (Senior) ===
As a senior, Pegues again started at free safety and tied his career-high with 50 tackles, 22 solo. He deflected six passes and intercepted two others. He continued to serve as a kick and punt returner for the Bulldogs ranking eighth in the conference with 26 punt returns for 172 yards (6.6 avg) and a 22.8-yard average on 31 kickoff returns in 11 contests. At the time of his departure he was Mississippi State's all-time leader in total kick returns, total kick yardage, kickoff returns and kickoff return yardage. He was selected to the coaches All-SEC second-team following the season.

== Professional career ==
Pegues had tryouts with the NFL's Chicago Bears in 2009 and the CFL's Saskatchewan Roughriders in 2011 but failed to make either roster. He spent the 2012 season with the Iowa Barnstormers

== Awards ==
=== High school ===
- Selected to play in the 2005 Alabama-Mississippi All-Star football game, leading the Mississippi team to a 21-18 victory
- Defensive Player of the Game in the 2005 U.S. Army All-American Bowl as a member of the West squad
- 2004 Gatorade Player of the Year in Mississippi
- Named one of three finalists for Mississippi's 2004 "Mr. Football" award, annually presented to the State's top player by the Clarion-Ledger, along with Ole Miss signee Jerrell Powe and Alabama signee Jimmy Johns, who won the award
- First-Team All-State selection by the Jackson Clarion-Ledger, 2003-2004
- First-Team Class 5A All-State selection by the Mississippi Association of Coaches (MAC) in 2004
- Named to the Clarion-Ledger 2004 "Dandy Dozen" list, representing the paper's selection of the State's top 12 players
- College Prospect Rankings
  - #4 Cornerback prospect, #2 Mississippi prospect, #35 overall prospect (Rivals.com)
  - #5 Cornerback prospect, #54 Southeast prospect (Scout.com)
  - #1 prospect in Mississippi according to the "10 Most Wanted" rankings by the Clarion-Ledger
  - #4 Cornerback prospect, #1 prospect in Mississippi (Superprep Magazine)
  - #3 prospect in Mississippi (BulldogBlitz.com)
  - #4 prospect in Mississippi (Dawgs' Bite Magazine)

=== College ===
- 2007 AutoZone Liberty Bowl MVP
- 2007 All-SEC First Team (AP, Rivals.com), Second Team (SEC Coaches)
- 2007 SEC Weekly Awards
  - Week 3 Defensive Player of the Week
  - Week 8 Outstanding Performer
  - Week 13 Special Teams Player of the Week (13)
- 2007 Preseason All-SEC First Team (SEC Coaches, Phil Steele)
- 2006 All-SEC Second Team (Coaches, Scout.com)

== Statistics ==
=== High school ===
- Passing

	Comp	Att	%	Yards	TD	INT
2003 (Jr.)	59	102	57.8	1,160	13	4
2004 (Sr.)	-	-	-	637	6	-
Total	-	-	-	1,797	19	-

- Rushing

	Att	Yards	Avg	TD
2003 (Jr.)	138	1,460	10.5	28
2004 (Sr.)	-	1,659	-	26
Total	-	3,119	-	54

- Defense

	Tckl	BrkUp	INT	FR
2003 (Jr.)	45	15	7	2
2004 (Sr.)	51	-	5	-
Total	96	-	12	-

=== College ===
- Defense

	GP/GS	TCKL	TFL-YDS	SCK-YDS	FF/FR	BRKUP	INT-YDS
2005 (Fr.)	11/0	14	-	-	1/0	2	1-3
2006 (So.)	12/12	32	1.5-6	-	0/0	5	4-95
2007 (Jr.)	13/13	50	2-3	-	0/1	7	5-120
Total	36/25	96	3.5-9	-	1/1	14	10-218

- Kick Return

	GP/GS	RET	YARDS	AVG	TD	LONG (OPP)
2005 (Fr.)	11/11	28	559	20	0	51 (Auburn)
2006 (So.)	12/12	29	687	23.7	0	61 (Tulane)
2007 (Jr.)	13/13	24	544	22.7	0	51 (West Virginia)
Total	36/36	81	1790	22.1	0	61 (Tulane)

- Punt Return

	GP/GS	RET	YARDS	AVG	TD	LONG (OPP)
2005 (Fr.)	11/0	1	2	2	0	2 (Houston)
2006 (So.)	12/12	25	350	14	1	81 (Jacksonville St.)
2007 (Jr.)	13/13	27	268	9.9	1	75 (Ole Miss)
Total	36/25	53	620	11.7	2	81 (Jacksonville St.)
