= Jamarca Sanford =

American football player (born 1985)

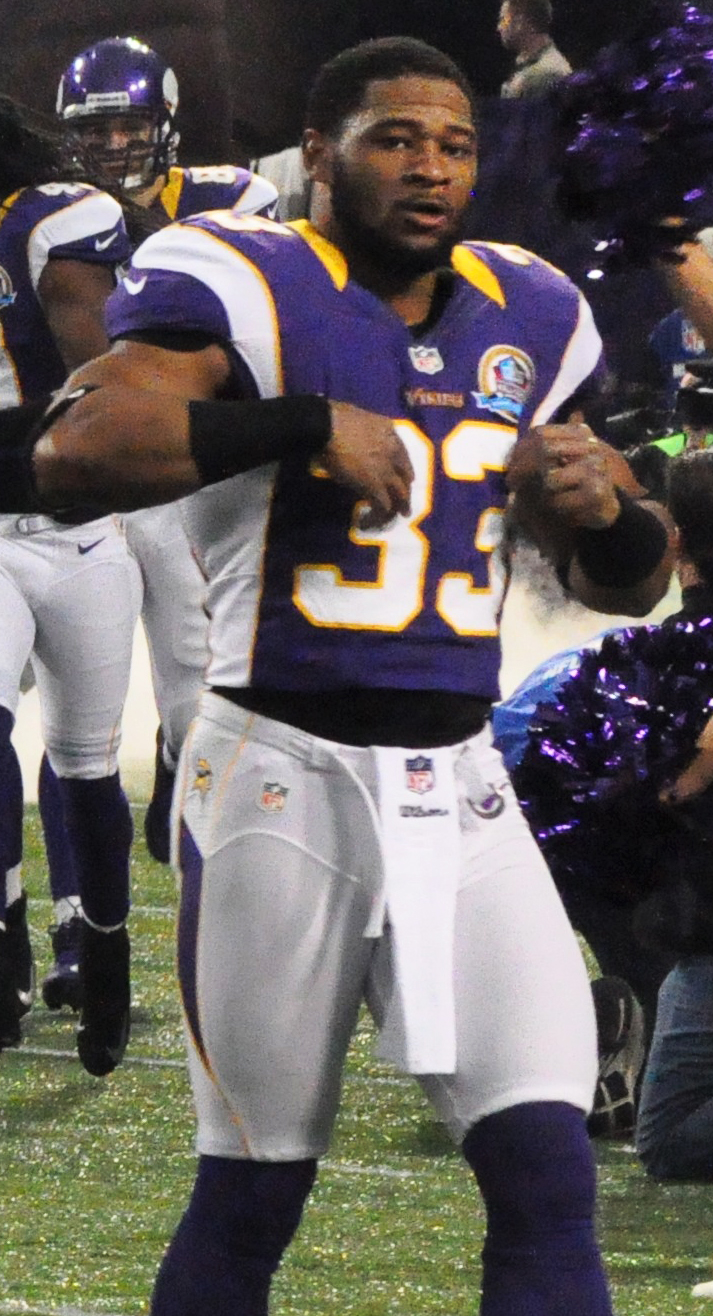
- Sanford with the Minnesota Vikings in 2012

No. 33, 38, 24
- Position: Safety

Personal information
- Born: August 27, 1985 (age 41); Batesville, Mississippi, U.S.
- Listed height: 5 ft 10 in (1.78 m)
- Listed weight: 200 lb (91 kg)

Career information
- High school: South Panola (Batesville)
- College: Ole Miss (2004–2008)
- NFL draft: 2009: 7th round, 231st overall pick

Career history
- Minnesota Vikings (2009–2013); Washington Redskins (2014); New Orleans Saints (2014–2016)

Career NFL statistics
- Total tackles: 298
- Sacks: 1.0
- Forced fumbles: 7
- Fumble recoveries: 5
- Interceptions: 3
- Stats at Pro Football Reference

Jamarca Deshaun Sanford (born August 27, 1985) is an American former professional football player who was a safety in the National Football League (NFL). He was selected by the Minnesota Vikings in the seventh round of the 2009 NFL draft as the 231st pick. He played college football for the Ole Miss Rebels.

== Early life ==
The son of James and Shirley Taylor, Sanford's talent in football was recognized at South Panola High School, where he earned a career record of 320 tackles and 25 quarterback sacks. In 2003, his senior year, he was ranked 9th in the USA Today national ranking for seniors. That year, he had 98 tackles, seven QB sacks, four forced fumbles and three interceptions. South Panola that year went to the 5A Mississippi state championship undefeated and took the game, with Sanford voted "Most Valuable Player".

Sanford received a number of other recognitions for his high school playing. The Clarion-Ledger named him Top 40, All-State and All-Region. He also received All-State honors, Class 5A first-team, as an outside linebacker from the Mississippi Association of Coaches and All-Region team by PrepStar. He made the roster of the Mississippi-Alabama All-Star Classic in Mobile, Alabama, in 2004. He was also included on a number of superlative player lists; the Max Emfinger Super South Top 200 ranked him at 7 among strong safeties in 2003, Rivals.com listed him 19th in the state, and The Sun Herald placed him among its Top 30 Prep Recruits.

== College career ==
In 2004, Sanford attended the University of Mississippi, where his cousins Toward Sanford, Eddie Strong and Kevin Thomas played for the Rebels, but though he was signed to the team he was redshirted until 2005. That year, after briefly trying several positions, Sanford topped the depth chart as a strong safety, starting 10 out of 11 games in that position.

Sanford turned in a strong performance in the 2005 season, for which he lettered. With 58 tackles in the season, including 40 solos, Sanford ranked fourth for tackles on his team, but first among SEC freshmen and 12th among all league defensive backs at 5.3 stops per game. He also had two fumble recoveries, which tied him 6th in the conference, one interception and one pass-break up. As with high school, Sanford's playing drew attention. CollegeFootballNews.com named him First-team Preseason Redshirt Freshman All-America, while SEC Coaches and Sporting News gave him First-team Freshman All-SEC honors. Sporting News also named him Third-team Freshman All-America.

In 2006, Sanford started four games as a linebacker with another seven as strong safety. Earning his second letter for this season, he was again fourth on his team for tackles, with 64. He also was credited with 1.5 QB sacks.

Sanford took his third letter in 2007, when as a strong safety he started 10 games. Athlon named him Preseason Third-team All-SEC that year. That year, he had 83 tackles to his credit, averaging 8.3 per game, placing him third on his team and sixth in the SEC. He was fourth on his team for tackles for losses with 5.5 and pass break-ups with 4. He also forced two fumbles and blocked a punt.

In his senior year of 2008, for which he earned his fourth letter, Sanford continued as a strong safety, starting all 13 games and standing as team captain. He was given the 2008 Chucky Mullins Courage Award and wore the number "38" in honor of that Ole Miss defensive back, who had been rendered quadriplegic during a game against Vanderbilt in 1989 before dying of a pulmonary embolism related to his injury in 1991. He made 82 tackles that year, ranking second, but coming in first in solo stops at 56. Two forced fumbles tied him at first on the team. His honors for the season included the Birmingham Alumni Club's 2008 Leadership Award and being named to Phil Steel's Midseason All-SEC third-team.

== Professional career ==
Pre-draft measurables
Height	Weight	Arm length	Hand span	40-yard dash	10-yard split	20-yard split	20-yard shuttle	Three-cone drill	Vertical jump	Broad jump	Bench press
5 ft 9 7/8 in (1.77 m)	214 lb (97 kg)	31 1/2 in (0.80 m)	8 5/8 in (0.22 m)	4.43 s	1.53 s	2.52 s	4.20 s	7.02 s	33.5 in (0.85 m)	9 ft 8 in (2.95 m)	29 reps
All values from NFL Combine/Pro Day

=== Minnesota Vikings ===
Sanford follows in the footsteps of another one of his cousins, Dwayne Rudd. In the 2009 NFL draft, Sanford was selected as the 231st overall pick in the seventh round by the Minnesota Vikings. It was in the 1997 NFL draft that cousin Rudd was the 20th pick by Minnesota in the 1st round.

Another cousin, Eddie Strong, went undrafted in the 2003 NFL draft but signed as a free agent rookie with the New York Giants in May 2003. He was released by New York 3 months later in August.

In 2011, Sanford was named the starting strong safety after the original starter Madieu Williams was released. The 2 years before he was a special teams Safety getting on average 15 tackles a year. Sanford started 15 games for the Vikings and recorded a career-high 75 tackles.

On March 14, 2013, Sanford re-signed with the Vikings on a two-year, $5 million contract.

The Vikings placed Sanford on injured reserve on August 30, 2014, due to multiple injuries. On September 8, he was released with an injury settlement.

=== Washington Redskins ===
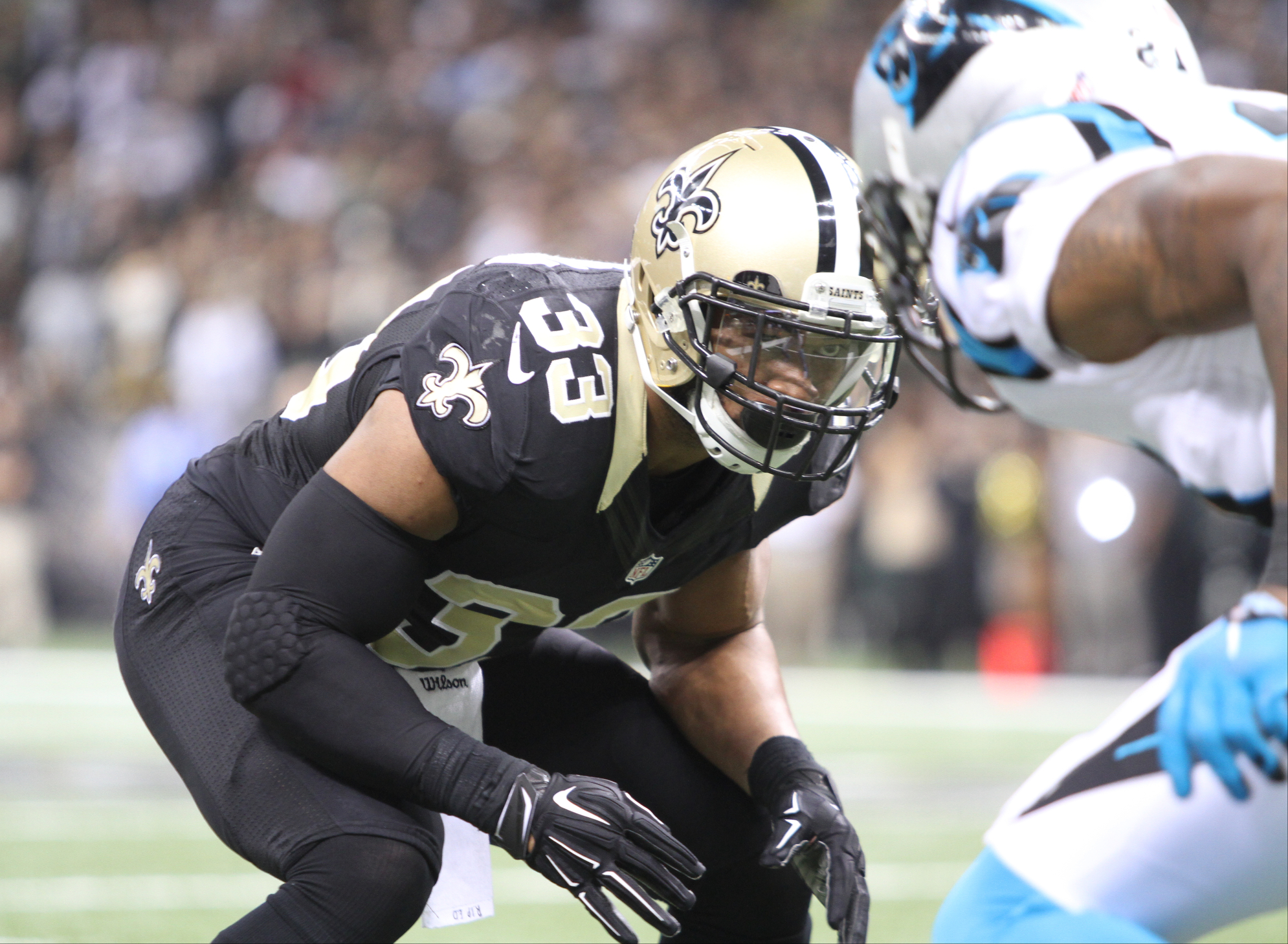
Sanford playing for the Saints in 2015.

On September 29, 2014, Sanford signed with the Washington Redskins. He was released on October 26, 2014.

=== New Orleans Saints ===
Sanford signed with the New Orleans Saints on November 11, 2014.

== NFL career statistics ==
Legend
**Bold**	Career high

=== Regular season ===
Year	Team	Games		Tackles					Interceptions					Fumbles			
Year	Team	GP	GS	Cmb	Solo	Ast	Sck	TFL	Int	Yds	TD	Lng	PD	FF	FR	Yds	TD
2009	MIN	14	1	30	23	7	0.0	1	0	0	0	0	0	0	0	0	0
2010	MIN	12	2	22	17	5	**1.0**	1	0	0	0	0	0	0	1	0	0
2011	MIN	15	**15**	**75**	46	**29**	0.0	1	**2**	**69**	0	**52**	**5**	1	**2**	**3**	0
2012	MIN	**16**	13	66	52	14	0.0	1	0	0	0	0	**5**	**4**	1	0	0
2013	MIN	13	13	**75**	**58**	17	0.0	**2**	0	0	0	0	1	2	1	0	0
2014	WAS	3	0	2	1	1	0.0	0	0	0	0	0	0	0	0	0	0
2014	NOR	6	2	14	12	2	0.0	**2**	0	0	0	0	0	0	0	0	0
2015	NOR	**16**	0	14	13	1	0.0	0	1	3	0	3	1	0	0	0	0
Career		95	46	298	222	76	1.0	8	3	72	0	52	12	7	5	3	0

=== Playoffs ===
Year	Team	Games		Tackles					Interceptions					Fumbles			
Year	Team	GP	GS	Cmb	Solo	Ast	Sck	TFL	Int	Yds	TD	Lng	PD	FF	FR	Yds	TD
2009	MIN	**2**	0	1	1	0	0.0	0	0	0	0	0	0	0	0	0	0
2012	MIN	1	**1**	**7**	**6**	**1**	0.0	0	0	0	0	0	0	0	0	0	0
Career		3	1	8	7	1	0.0	0	0	0	0	0	0	0	0	0	0
