= Saulsberry =

Saulsberry is a surname. Notable people with the surname include:

- Christian Saulsberry (1997–2022), American football player
- Quentin Saulsberry (born 1988), American football player
- Rodney Saulsberry (born 1956), American voice actor
- Leurhman Saulsberry (Born 1943), CEO of Saulsberry's Variety Shop

== See also ==
- Salisbury
