= 2007 Liberty Bowl =

2007 AutoZone Liberty Bowl
- 49th Liberty Bowl
UCF Knights	Mississippi State Bulldogs
(10–3)	(7–5)
C-USA	SEC
3	10
Head coach: George O'Leary	Head coach: Sylvester Croom
	1	2	3	4	Total
UCF	0	3	0	0	3
Mississippi State	0	3	0	7	10
- Date: December 29, 2007
- Season: 2007
- Stadium: Liberty Bowl Memorial Stadium
- Location: Memphis, Tennessee
- MVP: Derek Pegues (FS, Mississippi State)
- Favorite: UCF by 3
- National anthem: Kallen Esperian
- Referee: Ken Williamson (Sun Belt)
- Halftime show: Taylor Hicks
- Attendance: 63,816
- Payout: US$1.7 million per team

United States TV coverage
- Network: ESPN
- Announcers: Terry Gannon, David Norrie, and Vince Welch

The 2007 Liberty Bowl was a college football postseason bowl game played on December 29, 2007, at Liberty Bowl Memorial Stadium in Memphis, Tennessee. The 49th edition of the Liberty Bowl matched the University of Central Florida (UCF) Knights, winners of the Conference USA Championship for the first time in school history, and the Mississippi State University (MSU) Bulldogs, in their first bowl game under head coach Sylvester Croom. With sponsorship from AutoZone, the game was officially the AutoZone Liberty Bowl. Mississippi State free safety Derek Pegues intercepted two passes as part of an outstanding overall defensive effort by the Bulldogs on his way to earning MVP honors. The Bulldogs emerged victorious by a score of 10–3.

Scoring summary

Quarter	Time	Drive			Team	Scoring information	Score	
Quarter	Time	Plays	Yards	TOP	Team	Scoring information	UCF	MSU
2	11:49		18	1:43	UCF	45-yard field goal by Michael Torres	3	0
2	06:02		1	1:37	MSU	22-yard field goal by Adam Carlson	3	3
4	01:54		59	3:53	MSU	Anthony Dixon 1-yard touchdown run, Adam Carlson kick good	3	10
"TOP" = time of possession. For other American football terms, see Glossary of American football.							3	10
