= Quentin Saulsberry =

American gridiron football player (born 1988)

No. 55
- Position: Center / Guard

Personal information
- Born: October 14, 1988 (age 38); Memphis, Tennessee, U.S.
- Listed height: 6 ft 3 in (1.91 m)
- Listed weight: 275 lb (125 kg)

Career information
- High school: Independence (MS)
- College: Mississippi State
- NFL draft: 2012: undrafted

Career history
- Minnesota Vikings (2012)*; Denver Broncos (2012−2013)*; Los Angeles KISS (2014)*; New Orleans VooDoo (2014−2015); Winnipeg Blue Bombers (2014)*
- * Offseason or practice squad member only

Career AFL statistics
- Receptions: 1
- Total tackles: 3
- Stats at ArenaFan.com
- Stats at Pro Football Reference

Quentin Cortez Saulsberry (born October 14, 1988) is an American former football offensive lineman. He attended Mississippi State University from 2007 to 2011. Saulsberry is the only player in MSU Bulldogs history to play and start every game of his career (49). He was regarded as one of the best center prospects in the 2012 NFL draft.

== Early life ==
A native of Memphis, Tennessee, Saulsberry attended Independence High School in Independence, Mississippi, where he was a three-star offensive line prospect. He chose Mississippi State over Ole Miss and Memphis.

== College career ==
After redshirting his initial year at Mississippi State, Saulsberry started all 12 games of the year at right tackle. In his sophomore year, he made the transition to left guard, where he started all 12 games and helped pave the way for Anthony Dixon to set a new school record with 1,391 yards. The Bulldog offense lead the SEC and finish ninth nationally in rushing offense, averaging more than 227 yards per game.

In his junior season, Saulsberry started all but three games at right guard. He once started at left guard, and against Houston and Florida, replaced an injured J. C. Brignone at center. In his senior season, he started all 13 games, nine of which at right guard and four at center. He earned All-SEC Honorable Mention by the Associated Press, and played in the 2012 East–West Shrine Game.

== Professional career ==
=== National Football League ===
Considered a bit too small for an elite National Football League (NFL) interior lineman, Saulsberry projected as a late-round selection in the 2012 NFL draft. He eventually went undrafted, but was signed immediately afterwards by the Vikings. On August 31, 2012, as the Vikings reduced their roster down to league maximum of 53 players, he was released.

Pre-draft measurables
Height	Weight	Arm length	Hand span	40-yard dash	20-yard shuttle	Three-cone drill	Vertical jump	Broad jump	Bench press
6 ft 2 3/8 in (1.89 m)	304 lb (138 kg)	33 3/4 in (0.86 m)	9 7/8 in (0.25 m)	5.38 s	4.99 s	8.19 s	22 in (0.56 m)	7 ft 6 in (2.29 m)	26 reps
All values from NFL Combine

On September 3, 2012, Saulsberry was signed to the Denver Broncos' practice squad. On August 25, 2013, he was waived by the Broncos. He was cut after A DUI and a four-week PED suspension.

=== Arena Football League ===
On October 23, 2013, Saulsberry was assigned to the Los Angeles KISS of the Arena Football League.

On January 23, 2014, Saulsberry was traded to the New Orleans VooDoo for claim order positioning. The VooDoo placed Saulsberry on the exempt list on April 9, 2014, when he signed with the Blue Bombers. He was activated on June 12, 2014, following his release from the Blue Bombers. Saulsberry started the remaining games for the VooDoo upon his return. On September 24, 2014, the VooDoo picked up Saulsberry's rookie option to retain him for the 2015 season.

=== Other leagues ===
On April 10, 2014, Saulsberry was signed by the Winnipeg Blue Bombers. He was released on June 12, 2014. With a family with a new child on the way, Saulsberry went back to Starkville finding a job in a factory then as a prison guard. In 2016, he became a police officer. He participated in The Spring League in April 2017.
