= Anthony Dixon =

American football player (born 1987)

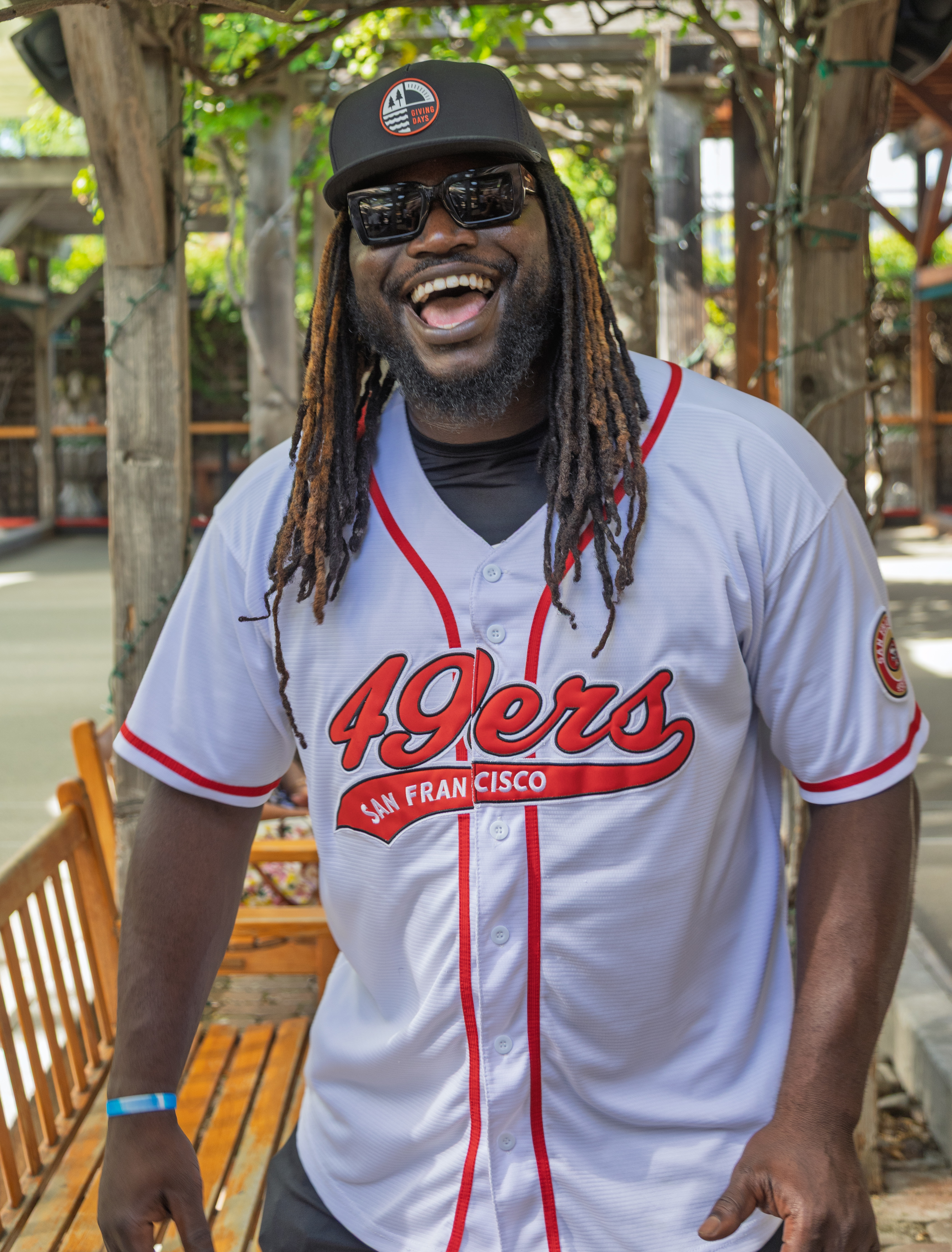
- Dixon in 2026

No. 24, 26
- Position: Running back

Personal information
- Born: September 24, 1987 (age 39); Jackson, Mississippi, U.S.
- Listed height: 6 ft 1 in (1.85 m)
- Listed weight: 233 lb (106 kg)

Career information
- High school: Terry (Terry, Mississippi)
- College: Mississippi State (2006–2009)
- NFL draft: 2010: 6th round, 173rd overall pick

Career history
- San Francisco 49ers (2010–2013); Buffalo Bills (2014–2015)

Awards and highlights
- Cellular South Conerly Trophy (2009); First-team All-SEC (2009)

Career NFL statistics
- Rushing attempts: 274
- Rushing yards: 934
- Receptions: 23
- Receiving yards: 140
- Total touchdowns: 11
- Stats at Pro Football Reference

Anthony Rishard "Boobie" Dixon (born September 24, 1987) is an American former professional football player who was a running back in the National Football League (NFL). He was selected by the San Francisco 49ers in the sixth round of the 2010 NFL draft. He played college football for the Mississippi State Bulldogs, with whom he holds multiple school rushing records.

== Early life ==
As a senior at Terry High School in 2005, he racked up 304 carries for 2,683 yards (8.8 average) and 31 touchdowns in leading Terry to an 11–2 mark. He was named the Jackson metro-area player of the year by The Clarion-Ledger. He was also a first-team All-State honoree by the paper, and was named to its (preseason) "Dandy Dozen" team (of the state's 12 best high school players) and its (postseason) "10 Most Wanted" list (of the state's top 10 college football prospects).

Considered a four-star recruit by Rivals.com, Dixon was listed as the No. 22 running back prospect in the nation in 2006. Scout.com ranked Dixon a four star prospect and the 30th best running back in the country.

He chose Mississippi State over University of Alabama, Louisiana State University, and Southern Miss.

== College career ==
In his true freshman season at Mississippi State University, Dixon played in all 12 games, starting five times, and set MSU true freshman records for rushing attempts, yards gained rushing, and touchdowns rushing. His nine touchdowns on the ground were the most by a Bulldog since Dicenzo Miller's ten TDs in 2000. He earned his nickname "Boobie" from his college teammates, who compared him to Boobie Miles, the character in Friday Night Lights.

As a sophomore, Dixon played all 13 games and started twelve. He became just the seventh halfback (ninth occurrence) in school history and the first Bulldog sophomore ever to surpass 1,000 yards rushing in a single season and his attempts set a Mississippi State single season record. He scored MSU's game-winning touchdown in the 2007 Liberty Bowl game.

During his junior season, Dixon started all 12 games he played in, and rushed for 869 yards, compiling a career-best 4.4 yards per carry.

With 1,391 rushing yards in his senior season, Dixon not only set the Mississippi State single-season rushing record (surpassing J. J. Johnson's 1998 record of 1,383 yards), he also became the seventh player in Southeastern Conference history to lead his team in rushing four times. He joined Eddie Price (Tulane, 1946–1949), Sonny Collins (Kentucky, 1972–1975), Dalton Hilliard (LSU, 1982–1985), Carl Woods (Vanderbilt, 1983–1986), Errict Rhett (Florida, 1990–1993), and Kevin Faulk (LSU, 1995–1998) on that list. Dixon accumulated 3,994 career rushing yards during his collegiate career.

=== College statistics ===
Year	Team	Games		Rushing					
Year	Team	GP	GS	Att	Yds	Avg	TD	Lng	Y/G
2006	Mississippi State	12	5	169	668	4.0	9	65	55.7
2007	Mississippi State	13	12	287	1,066	3.7	14	30	82.0
2008	Mississippi State	12	12	197	869	4.4	7	71	72.4
2009	Mississippi State	11	11	257	1,391	5.4	12	70	126.5
Career		48	40	910	3,994	4.4	42	71	84.1

- In addition, Dixon also accumulated 56 receptions, 449 Receiving Yards, and 4 Receiving Touchdowns in 4 years at MSU.

== Professional career ==
=== 2010 NFL draft ===
Dixon was considered one of the best "power backs" available in the 2010 NFL draft, alongside Toby Gerhart and Charles Scott. Projected as a third- to fourth-round pick, Dixon was thought to possibly be the Bulldogs' highest draftee since Jerious Norwood was selected by the Atlanta Falcons in the third round (79th overall) of the 2006 NFL draft. However, he was selected as the 173rd overall pick in the sixth round by the San Francisco 49ers.

Pre-draft measurables
Height	Weight	Arm length	Hand span	40-yard dash	10-yard split	20-yard split	20-yard shuttle	Three-cone drill	Vertical jump	Broad jump	Bench press	Wonderlic
6 ft 0 3/4 in (1.85 m)	233 lb (106 kg)	32 5/8 in (0.83 m)	9 3/4 in (0.25 m)	4.75 s	1.71 s	2.83 s	4.49 s	7.09 s	33 in (0.84 m)	10 ft 1 in (3.07 m)	15 reps	25
All values from NFL Combine

=== San Francisco 49ers ===
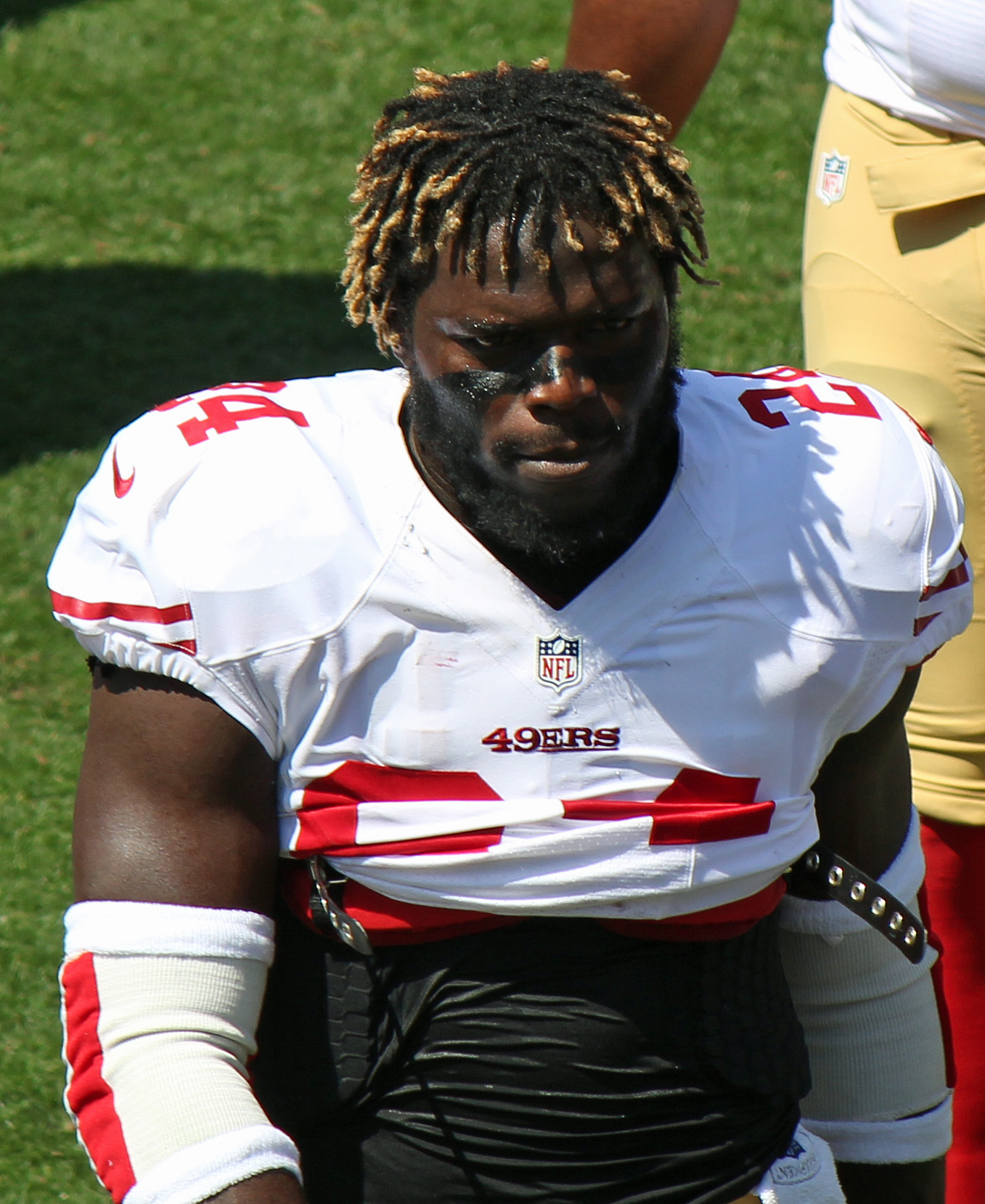
Dixon with the San Francisco 49ers in 2012

With the announcement of the sudden retirement of Glen Coffee on August 13, former head coach Mike Singletary stated that Dixon and veteran Michael Robinson would compete for the number 2 running back spot behind Pro Bowler Frank Gore. In the preseason, Dixon posted 74 rushes for 300 yards, averaging 75 yards per game and 4 touchdowns, leading the entire NFL in each of those categories. On September 20, 2010, Dixon rushed for his first career NFL touchdown against the New Orleans Saints on Monday Night Football. Despite playing well in the preseason, Dixon had only ten rushing attempts until week 12. After Gore suffered a fractured hip during a Monday Night Football game against the Arizona Cardinals on November 29, Dixon had 14 carries for 54 yards and a touchdown as a backup to Brian Westbrook, who took over for Gore. Dixon played in all 72 games of his NFL career, primarily on special teams. At the end of the 2012 season, Dixon and the 49ers appeared in Super Bowl XLVII. He contributed on special teams, but the 49ers fell to the Baltimore Ravens by a score of 34–31. His only start as a member of the 49ers came in the 2013 NFC Championship game as a fullback, scoring a touchdown that gave San Francisco a 10–0 lead. Coincidentally, that was his last game as a member of the 49ers. He finished his 49er career with 458 regular-season rushing yards and eight touchdowns.

=== Buffalo Bills ===
On March 15, 2014, Dixon signed a three-year, $3.5 million contract with the Buffalo Bills. Dixon went on to have the most productive year of his career, with career highs in rushing attempts (105), rushing yards (432), average yards per rush (4.1), as well as passes caught and receiving yardage (eight catches for 49 yards). Dixon also scored two rushing touchdowns, the same number he had scored each year since entering the NFL.

In 2015, Dixon's production dropped off significantly. He had only one rushing touchdown, and recorded both 44 yards rushing and 44 yards receiving. On March 1, 2016, Dixon was released by the Bills.

=== The Spring League ===
After spending the 2016 season out of football, Dixon played in front of NFL and Canadian Football League scouts as part of the inaugural season for a new instructional and developmental football program, The Spring League, taking part in both the April training camp and games held at The Greenbrier in West Virginia, as well as the 2017 Summer Showcase game held in Napa, California. As one of The Spring League's "marquee players" Dixon was one of the more vocal players in the league, and predicted he would amass 100 yards and 2 touchdowns during the California Showcase game. Playing as part of team California, Dixon's teammate included fellow running back Glen Coffee, the player Dixon replaced as a member of the 49ers. Playing predominately as a fullback, Dixon's first carry was a 49-yard touchdown run. Late in the game, Dixon caught a 4-yard touchdown pass from David Ash. Both plays occurred on 4th down, and were the first and last scores of the game, respectively. Dixon's totals were 7 carries for 55 yards, 5 catches for 23 yards, and the two touchdowns. With 78 total yards on 12 touches, Dixon was short of his statistical pregame prediction, but nonetheless he was listed as one of the Stand Out Players of the game during the Summer Showcase broadcast.

== Personal life ==
Dixon is a Christian. Dixon describes himself on his Twitter account as a "God Fearing Man" and frequently tweets about his faith.

Anthony also has three younger brothers Antwon, Rashun, and Deshun (from oldest to youngest). Antwon and Rashun both committed to play football at Mississippi State, although neither played at MSU. Antwon instead went to Hinds Community College before transferring to Midwestern State University. Rashun was selected in the 10th round (304th overall) in the 2008 Major League Baseball draft by the Oakland As and chose to play professional baseball. Deshun was also drafted by in the MLB draft, taken in the 10th round by the Tampa Bay Rays in the 2010 Major League Baseball draft.
