= Dwayne Rudd =

American football player (born 1976)

No. 57
- Position: Linebacker

Personal information
- Born: February 3, 1976 (age 50); Batesville, Mississippi, U.S.
- Listed height: 6 ft 2 in (1.88 m)
- Listed weight: 235 lb (107 kg)

Career information
- High school: South Panola (Batesville)
- College: Alabama (1994–1996)
- NFL draft: 1997: 1st round, 20th overall pick

Career history
- Minnesota Vikings (1997–2000); Cleveland Browns (2001–2002); Tampa Bay Buccaneers (2003); Oakland Raiders (2004)*
- * Offseason or practice squad member only

Awards and highlights
- Second-team All-Pro (1998); First-team All-American (1996); First-team All-SEC (1996)

Career NFL statistics
- Tackles: 512
- Sacks: 11.5
- Forced fumbles: 4
- Fumble recoveries: 4
- Interceptions: 1
- Defensive touchdowns: 2
- Stats at Pro Football Reference

Dwayne Dupree Rudd (born February 3, 1976) is an American former professional football player who was a linebacker in the National Football League (NFL). He was selected in the first round of the 1997 NFL draft. During his career he played for the Minnesota Vikings, Cleveland Browns and Tampa Bay Buccaneers. Rudd was a teammate of Pittsburgh Steelers cornerback Deshea Townsend in both high school and college, at South Panola High School and the University of Alabama, respectively. Derek Pegues, a South Panola alum and an All-SEC defensive back for Mississippi State, is his cousin.

== NFL career statistics ==
Pre-draft measurables
Height	Weight	Arm length	Hand span	40-yard dash	10-yard split	20-yard split	20-yard shuttle	Three-cone drill	Vertical jump	Broad jump	Bench press
6 ft 1 7/8 in (1.88 m)	242 lb (110 kg)	34 1/2 in (0.88 m)	9 3/8 in (0.24 m)	4.65 s	1.65 s	2.74 s	4.23 s	7.21 s	39.5 in (1.00 m)	9 ft 7 in (2.92 m)	29 reps
All values from NFL Combine

Legend
	NFL record
	Led the league
**Bold**	Career high

=== Regular season ===
Year	Team	Games		Tackles				Interceptions				Fumbles			
Year	Team	GP	GS	Comb	Solo	Ast	Sck	Int	Yds	TD	Lng	FF	FR	Yds	TD
1997	MIN	16	2	46	31	15	**5.0**	0	0	0	0	1	0	0	0
1998	MIN	15	15	93	79	14	2.0	0	0	0	0	0	**3**	157	**2**
1999	MIN	16	16	**117**	**89**	**28**	3.0	0	0	0	0	**2**	1	0	0
2000	MIN	14	13	69	52	17	0.0	0	0	0	0	0	0	0	0
2001	CLE	16	16	101	73	**28**	0.5	**1**	0	0	0	1	0	0	0
2002	CLE	16	15	63	51	12	1.0	0	0	0	0	0	0	0	0
2003	TAM	16	2	23	16	7	0.0	0	0	0	0	0	0	0	0
		109	79	512	391	121	11.5	1	0	0	0	4	4	157	2

=== Playoffs ===
Year	Team	Games		Tackles				Interceptions				Fumbles			
Year	Team	GP	GS	Comb	Solo	Ast	Sck	Int	Yds	TD	Lng	FF	FR	Yds	TD
1997	MIN	2	2	13	8	**5**	0.0	0	0	0	0	0	0	0	0
1998	MIN	2	2	7	6	1	0.0	0	0	0	0	0	0	0	0
1999	MIN	2	2	13	11	2	0.0	0	0	0	0	**1**	**1**	0	0
2000	MIN	2	2	**19**	**14**	**5**	0.0	0	0	0	0	0	0	0	0
2002	CLE	1	1	3	2	1	0.0	0	0	0	0	0	0	0	0
		9	9	55	41	14	0.0	0	0	0	0	1	1	0	0

== Celebration penalties ==
In the 2002 season opener between the Browns and the Kansas City Chiefs, the Browns were clinging to a 39–37 lead with 4 seconds left. As Chiefs quarterback Trent Green dropped back to pass, the entire Browns defensive line swarmed him, and it initially appeared that Rudd had sacked Green as time expired. However, Green had actually lateraled the ball to tackle John Tait while in the act of falling, just before he had hit the ground. Not having seen this happen and believing that the game was over, Rudd took off his helmet and threw it in the air in celebration of an apparent Browns victory.

In the meantime, Tait had run to the Browns' 26-yard line where he was knocked out of bounds. That would have been the end of the game, but Rudd was called for unsportsmanlike conduct for his premature helmet toss. Since football games, by rule, cannot end on an accepted defensive penalty, the Chiefs got the chance to run one last untimed play. The ball was moved to the 13-yard line (half the distance to the goal from the end of the run). Chiefs kicker Morten Andersen then booted a 30-yard field goal to win the game 40–39.

Rudd encountered a similar incident the next season in Tampa; as part of the Tampa Bay Buccaneers, he saw his teammate Simeon Rice draw an unsportsmanlike conduct penalty in a game against the Indianapolis Colts after a game-winning field goal attempt failed, giving the Colts another chance to win the game—being successful the second time.

== Accomplishments ==
Rudd holds the NFL record for most fumble return yards in a single season with 157, which he set in 1998. He also shares the modern NFL record (with many players) both for the most total fumble recoveries for touchdowns in a season and the most opponent fumble recoveries for touchdowns in a season, with two apiece. Link Lyman, playing in 1924, holds the NFL record for the most fumble recovery touchdowns in a single season with 3. He achieved this feat with the Chicago Cardinals.
