= Brookhaven School District =

School district in Mississippi, USA

Address
- 326 East Court Street Brookhaven, Mississippi, 39601; United States
- Coordinates: 31.579487°N 90.437752°W

District information
- Type: Public
- Grades: PK–13
- Schools: 7
- NCES District ID: 2800840

Students and staff
- Students: 2,429 (2025–2026)
- Teachers: 202.00 (on an FTE basis) (2025–2026)
- Staff: 255.00 (on an FTE basis) (2025–2026)
- Student–teacher ratio: 12.02 (2025–2026)

Other information
- Website: https://www.brookhavenschools.org

Brookhaven School District is a public school district serving the city of Brookhaven and surrounding areas in Lincoln County, Mississippi.

In 2019, it had 2,800 students, with 65% being African-American. In 2019, the district allowed parents to ask for specific teachers, a "parental request" system with black and white parents actively using it. As a result there are elementary classrooms that are majority white and some that are all black, which Adam Northam of The Clarion-Ledger states is a de facto racial segregation system.

== Schools ==
- Brookhaven High School (Grades 9-12)
- Alexander Junior High School (Grades 7-8)
- Lipsey Middle School (Grades 5-6)
- Brookhaven Elementary School (Grades 3-4)
- Mamie Martin Elementary School (Grades K-2)
- Fannie Mullins Alternative School

== Demographics ==
=== 2006-07 school year ===
There were a total of 3,050 students enrolled in the Brookhaven School District during the 2006–07 school year. The gender makeup of the district was about 50% female and 50% male. The racial makeup of the district was 61.61% African American, 37.34% White, 0.43% Hispanic, 0.59% Asian, and 0.03% Native American. 56.9% of the district's students were eligible to receive free lunch.

=== Previous school years ===
School Year	Enrollment	Gender Makeup		Racial Makeup				
School Year	Enrollment	Female	Male	Asian	African American	Hispanic	Native American	White
2005-06	3,144	50%	50%	0.60%	60.97%	0.48%	0.06%	37.88%
2004-05	3,024	50%	50%	0.40%	59.99%	0.26%	0.07%	39.29%
2003-04	2,967	50%	50%	0.37%	59.35%	0.27%	0.13%	39.87%
2002-03	2,993	51%	49%	0.33%	60.44%	0.17%	0.17%	38.89%

== Accountability statistics ==
	2006-07	2005-06	2004-05	2003-04	2002-03
District Accreditation Status	Accredited	Accredited	Accredited	Accredited	Accredited
School Performance Classifications
Level 5 (Superior Performing) Schools	0	0	0	0	0
Level 4 (Exemplary) Schools	1	2	1	2	1
Level 3 (Successful) Schools	3	2	3	2	3
Level 2 (Under Performing) Schools	0	0	0	0	0
Level 1 (Low Performing) Schools	0	0	0	0	0
Not Assigned	1	1	1	1	1

== See also ==
- List of school districts in Mississippi
