= South Panola School District =

School district in Mississippi

South Panola High School

Location
- 601 Tiger Drive; Batesville, (Panola County), Mississippi 38606; United States
- 34.320444°N 89.939899°W

Information
- Type: Public high school
- Principal: David Odom
- Staff: 98.74 (FTE)
- Enrollment: 1,172 (2023-24)
- Student to teacher ratio: 11.87
- Colors: Blue, white and red
- Nickname: Tigers
- Website: South Panola High School

The South Panola School District is a public school district based in Batesville, Mississippi, US.

In addition to Batesville, the district also serves the village of Pope, the town of Courtland, and the Panola County portion of Crowder as well as rural areas in southern Panola County.

== Schools ==
- South Panola High School
- Batesville Junior High School
- Batesville Middle School
- Batesville Intermediate School
- Batesville Elementary School
- Pope School
- South Panola Alternative school

== Demographics ==
=== 2006–07 school year ===
There were a total of 4,671 students enrolled in the South Panola School District during the 2006–2007 school year. The gender makeup of the district was 49% female and 51% male. The racial makeup of the district was 56.13% African American, 42.71% White, 1.03% Hispanic, and 0.13% Asian. 61.8% of the district's students were eligible to receive free lunch.

=== Previous school years ===
School Year	Enrollment	Gender Makeup		Racial Makeup				
School Year	Enrollment	Female	Male	Asian	African American	Hispanic	Native American	White
2005–06	4,690	49%	51%	0.15%	55.29%	1.11%	–	43.45%
2004–05	4,690	49%	51%	0.15%	55.29%	0.94%	–	43.62%
2003–04	4,665	49%	51%	0.26%	55.63%	0.84%	0.02%	43.26%
2002–03	4,592	49%	51%	0.37%	56.05%	0.81%	0.02%	42.75%

== Accountability statistics ==
	2006–07	2005–06	2004–05	2003–04	2002–03
District Accreditation Status	Accredited	Accredited	Accredited	Accredited	Accredited
School Performance Classifications
Level 5 (Superior Performing) Schools	0	0	0	1	0
Level 4 (Exemplary) Schools	1	3	1	1	0
Level 3 (Successful) Schools	4	2	4	3	5
Level 2 (Under Performing) Schools	0	0	0	0	0
Level 1 (Low Performing) Schools	0	0	0	0	0
Not Assigned	1	1	1	1	1

== Athletics ==
South Panola High School (sometimes referred to as "SP," or "USP," in reference to the nickname of the "University of South Panola," (bestowed by Jackson Clarion-Ledger sports writer Rick Cleveland) is known for its impressive football tradition.

SP (whose mascot is the Tiger) holds the third-longest winning streak in high school football history—89 games, which began in 2003 and ended in 2008 at the hands of the Meridian High School Wildcats in the Mississippi 5A Championship Game. Only two winning streaks are longer in high school football: Independence High School (Charlotte, North Carolina) won 109 consecutive games from 2000 to 2007 and De La Salle High School in Concord, California won 151 consecutive games from 1992 to 2003.

The Tigers captured five straight MHSAA Class 5A State Championships from 2003 to 2007, which is the longest streak of MHSAA State Championships since the Association began holding playoffs in 1981. Their streak of seven straight appearances in the 5A Championship game is also a record.

In 2009 the MHSAA added a 6A classification and SP was realigned into that classification. In the inaugural 6A championship game on December 4, 2009, SP gained yet another title with a 56–14 win over Oak Grove on December 4, 2009, at Mississippi Veterans Memorial Stadium in Jackson, Mississippi. This title was the Tigers' eighth overall, more than any other MHSAA member school.

South Panola Tigers 5A Championship Football Game history:

Year	5A Champion		5A Runner-up		Tigers' Record	Head coach	USA Today National Rank
1993	South Panola Tigers	42	Warren Central Vikings	28	15–0	Willis Wright	13th
1996	Moss Point Tigers	33	South Panola Tigers	30	14–1	Ed Stanley	NR
1997	Moss Point Tigers	17	South Panola Tigers	14	14–1	Ed Stanley	NR
1998	South Panola Tigers	45	Hattiesburg Tigers	17	14–1	Ed Stanley	NR
2002	Wayne County War Eagles	21	South Panola Tigers	14	14–1	Ricky Woods	NR
2003	South Panola Tigers	33	Oak Grove Warriors	14	15–0	Ricky Woods	9th
2004	South Panola Tigers	39	Ocean Springs Greyhounds	21	15–0	Ricky Woods	7th
2005	South Panola Tigers	52	Meridian Wildcats	14	15–0	Ricky Woods	6th
2006	South Panola Tigers	28	Meridian Wildcats	21	15–0	Ricky Woods	9th
2007	South Panola Tigers	28	George County Rebels	21	15–0	Lance Pogue	9th
2008	Meridian Wildcats	26	South Panola Tigers	20	14–1	Lance Pogue	NR

In 2009, with the expansion of classifications to 6, South Panola moved up to 6A in 2009.

South Panola Tigers 6A Championship Football Game history:

Year	6A Champion		6A Runner-up		Tigers' Record	Head coach	USA Today National Rank
2009	South Panola Tigers	56	Oak Grove Warriors	14	14–1	Lance Pogue	NR
2010	South Panola Tigers	28	Meridian Wildcats	7	15–0	Lance Pogue	1st
2012	South Panola Tigers	31	Brandon Bulldogs	23	13-2	Lance Pogue	NR
2014	South Panola Tigers	27	Oak Grove Warriors	21	15-0	Lance Pogue	12th

Not surprisingly, South Panola's football program has produced an impressive lineage of college and professional football players. Among the most well-known are former teammates on South Panola's first championship team in 1993 and at the University of Alabama, linebacker Dwayne Rudd, a former member of the NFL's Cleveland Browns and Tampa Bay Buccaneers, and cornerback Deshea Townsend of the NFL's Pittsburgh Steelers. The 1996 and 1997 state runner-up teams featured quarterback Josh Bright, who went on to lead Delta State to the Division II national championship in 2000 and was also honored that same year with the Conerly Trophy which is given to the best college football player in Mississippi. Peria Jerry, a defensive tackle for Ole Miss, was selected as an All-American by the Associated Press and was later drafted in the first round of the 2009 NFL Draft, selected as the 24th pick by the Atlanta Falcons. Derek Pegues, who was a two-time First Team All-State honoree (by the Jackson Clarion-Ledger) as South Panola's quarterback from 2003 to 2004, later starred as a defensive back for Mississippi State University of the Southeastern Conference. He was an All-SEC selection in 2007 (Second-Team defense). Several of Pegues' teammates also competed in the SEC: Demario Bobo (DB Sr., Mississippi State), brothers Peria and John Jerry (DL & OL, Atlanta Falcons & Miami Dolphins, respectively)(DL & OL Jr. & So., respectively, Ole Miss), Jamarca Sanford (Safety – Minnesota Vikings)(DB Jr., Ole Miss), Chris Strong (LB, Fr., Ole Miss) and Jeramie Griffin (RB, Fr., Alabama). Former Ole Miss standouts such as linebacker Eddie Strong and defensive back Toward Sanford also attended South Panola. In the 2019 NFL draft, former South Panola running back, Darrell Henderson, was drafted to the Los Angeles Rams in the 3rd round.

The South Panola High School Varsity Cheerleaders were ranked sixth in the nation in the Super Varsity division at the 2007 UCA Nationals in Orlando, Florida. South Panola Junior High School Cheerleaders were ranked fifth in the nation in the large division at the 2007 UCA Nationals in Orlando, Florida.

More recently, the girl's fastpitch softball team won the 2006–2007 state championship by defeating Oak Grove in a 2/3 set. This marked the first time the South Panola softball team won the state championship. The Lady Tigers repeated as state fast-pitch softball champions in 2008. Star pitcher, Whitney Kihnl, was named the state's Miss Softball both years by The Clarion Ledger.

Batesville Junior High's seventh and eighth football teams were undefeated for the 2006–2007 school year.

== See also ==
- List of school districts in Mississippi
