= 2008 LSU Tigers football team =

American college football season

2008 LSU Tigers football

Chick-fil-A Bowl champion

Chick-fil-A Bowl, W 38–3 vs. Georgia Tech
- Conference: Southeastern Conference
- Western Division
- Record: 8–5 (3–5 SEC)
- Head coach: Les Miles (4th season)
- Offensive coordinator: Gary Crowton (2nd season)
- Offensive scheme: Pro-style
- Co-defensive coordinators: Doug Mallory (1st season); Bradley Dale Peveto (1st season)
- Base defense: 4–3
- Home stadium: Tiger Stadium (Capacity: 92,400)

2008 Southeastern Conference football standings
	Conf.			Overall
Team	W		L	W		L
Eastern Division
No. 1 Florida x$#	7	–	1	13	–	1
No. 13 Georgia	6	–	2	10	–	3
Vanderbilt	4	–	4	7	–	6
South Carolina	4	–	4	7	–	6
Tennessee	3	–	5	5	–	7
Kentucky	2	–	6	7	–	6
Western Division
No. 6 Alabama x%	8	–	0	12	–	2
No. 14 Ole Miss	5	–	3	9	–	4
LSU	3	–	5	8	–	5
Arkansas	2	–	6	5	–	7
Auburn	2	–	6	5	–	7
Mississippi State	2	–	6	4	–	8
Championship: Florida 31, Alabama 20
# – BCS National Champion; $ – BCS representative as conference champion; % – BCS at-large representative; x – Division champion/co-champions; Rankings from AP Poll

The 2008 LSU Tigers football team represented Louisiana State University in the 2008 NCAA Division I FBS football season. The team's head coach was Les Miles, who entered his fourth year at the helm. They played their home games at Tiger Stadium in Baton Rouge, Louisiana. The Tigers entered the season as defending national champions, having defeated Ohio State, 38–24, in the 2008 BCS National Championship Game.

== Pre-season ==
In February, the NCAA granted defensive end Kirston Pittman a sixth-year of eligibility. Pittman had missed the 2005 and 2006 seasons with foot and ankle injuries.

=== Coaching changes ===
Defensive coordinator Bo Pelini left to become the head coach at Nebraska.

=== 2008 recruiting class ===
College recruiting (2008)
Name	Hometown	School	Height	Weight	Commit date
Chancey Aghayere; DL	Garland, Texas	Garland High School	6 ft 4 in (1.93 m)	243 lb (110 kg)	Oct 13, 2007
Chancey Aghayere; DL	Recruit ratings: Scout: Rivals: (86)				
Ryan Baker; LB	Grand Ridge, Florida	Bountstown High School	6 ft 0 in (1.83 m)	210 lb (95 kg)	Jul 30, 2007
Ryan Baker; LB	Recruit ratings: Scout: Rivals: (80)				
DeAngelo Benton; WR	Bastrop, Louisiana	Bastrop High School	6 ft 5 in (1.96 m)	185 lb (84 kg)	Feb 3, 2008
DeAngelo Benton; WR	Recruit ratings: Scout: Rivals: (81)				
Matt Branch; TE	Monroe, Louisiana	Sterlington High School	6 ft 5 in (1.96 m)	240 lb (110 kg)	Jun 1, 2007
Matt Branch; TE	Recruit ratings: Scout: Rivals: (79)				
Derrick Bryant; DB	Lawrenceville, Georgia	Peachtree Ridge High School	6 ft 0 in (1.83 m)	185 lb (84 kg)	Oct 13, 2007
Derrick Bryant; DB	Recruit ratings: Scout: Rivals: (76)				
Chase Clement; DE	Thibodaux, Louisiana	E.D. White High School	6 ft 6 in (1.98 m)	245 lb (111 kg)	Dec 8, 2007
Chase Clement; DE	Recruit ratings: Scout: Rivals: (80)				
Rockey Duplessis; DB	Belle Chasse, Louisiana	Belle Chasse High School	6 ft 1 in (1.85 m)	185 lb (84 kg)	May 4, 2007
Rockey Duplessis; DB	Recruit ratings: Scout: Rivals: (79)				
Lavar Edwards; DE	Gretna, Louisiana	Desire Street Academy	6 ft 4 in (1.93 m)	280 lb (130 kg)	Jan 26, 2008
Lavar Edwards; DE	Recruit ratings: Scout: Rivals: (40)				
Tyler Edwards; TE	Monroe, Louisiana	Ouachita Parish High School	6 ft 3 in (1.91 m)	240 lb (110 kg)	Jan 5, 2008
Tyler Edwards; TE	Recruit ratings: Scout: Rivals: (80)				
Cordian Hagans; DL	Snellville, Georgia	Northview High School	6 ft 5 in (1.96 m)	290 lb (130 kg)	Jul 22, 2007
Cordian Hagans; DL	Recruit ratings: Scout: Rivals: (77)				
Karnell Hatcher; DB	Delray Beach, Florida	Atlantic Community High School	6 ft 2 in (1.88 m)	190 lb (86 kg)	Nov 12, 2007
Karnell Hatcher; DB	Recruit ratings: Scout: Rivals: (82)				
Alex Hurst; OL	Bartlett, Tennessee	Arlington High School	6 ft 5 in (1.96 m)	290 lb (130 kg)	Oct 6, 2007
Alex Hurst; OL	Recruit ratings: Scout: Rivals: (40)				
Jordan Jefferson; QB	St. Rose, Louisiana	Destrehan High School	6 ft 4 in (1.93 m)	210 lb (95 kg)	Nov 10, 2007
Jordan Jefferson; QB	Recruit ratings: Scout: Rivals: (80)				
Patrick Peterson; DB	Pompano Beach, Florida	Ely High School	6 ft 1 in (1.85 m)	175 lb (79 kg)	Jan 5, 2008
Patrick Peterson; DB	Recruit ratings: Scout: Rivals: (90)				
P.J. Lonergan; OL	New Orleans, Louisiana	Rummel High School	6 ft 4 in (1.93 m)	290 lb (130 kg)	Feb 25, 2007
P.J. Lonergan; OL	Recruit ratings: Scout: Rivals: (79)				
Tim Molton; WR	Montz, Louisiana	Destrehan High School	6 ft 3 in (1.91 m)	190 lb (86 kg)	Jul 25, 2007
Tim Molton; WR	Recruit ratings: Scout: Rivals: (74)				
Thomas Parsons; OL	Canyon Lake, Texas	Smithson Valley High School	6 ft 5 in (1.96 m)	272 lb (123 kg)	Jun 6, 2007
Thomas Parsons; OL	Recruit ratings: Scout: Rivals: (78)				
Deangelo Peterson; WR	New Orleans, Louisiana	Desire Street Academy	6 ft 3 in (1.91 m)	190 lb (86 kg)	Jul 10, 2007
Deangelo Peterson; WR	Recruit ratings: Scout: Rivals: (40)				
Kyle Prater; LB	Kerrville, Texas	Tivy High School	6 ft 1 in (1.85 m)	210 lb (95 kg)	Jul 31, 2007
Kyle Prater; LB	Recruit ratings: Scout: Rivals: (77)				
Greg Shaw; OL	Hialeah, Florida	Edward Pace High School	6 ft 5 in (1.96 m)	285 lb (129 kg)	
Greg Shaw; OL	Recruit ratings: Scout: Rivals: (79)				
Clay Spencer; OL	Baton Rouge, Louisiana	Parkview Baptist High School	6 ft 6 in (1.98 m)	285 lb (129 kg)	Feb 24, 2007
Clay Spencer; OL	Recruit ratings: Scout: Rivals: (76)				
Ryan St. Julien; DB	St. Martinville, Louisiana	Catholic-New Iberia High School	6 ft 1 in (1.85 m)	170 lb (77 kg)	Jun 8, 2007
Ryan St. Julien; DB	Recruit ratings: Scout: Rivals: (78)				
Brandon Taylor; DB	Franklinton, Louisiana	Franklinton High School	6 ft 0 in (1.83 m)	178 lb (81 kg)	Apr 3, 2007
Brandon Taylor; DB	Recruit ratings: Scout: Rivals: (80)				
Jhyryn Taylor; WR	Franklinton, Louisiana	Franklinton High School	6 ft 1 in (1.85 m)	180 lb (82 kg)	Apr 4, 2007
Jhyryn Taylor; WR	Recruit ratings: Scout: Rivals: (74)				
Kellen Theriot; LB	Houston, Texas	Episcopal High School	6 ft 1 in (1.85 m)	225 lb (102 kg)	Mar 30, 2007
Kellen Theriot; LB	Recruit ratings: Scout: Rivals: (76)				
Chris Tolliver; WR	Rayville, Louisiana	Rayville High School	6 ft 1 in (1.85 m)	189 lb (86 kg)	Dec 19, 2007
Chris Tolliver; WR	Recruit ratings: Scout: Rivals: (82)				
Overall recruit ranking:
Note: In many cases, Scout, Rivals, 247Sports, On3, and ESPN may conflict in their listings of height and weight.; In these cases, the average was taken. ESPN grades are on a 100-point scale.; Sources: "LSU Commit List 2008". Rivals.; "Scout.com Football Recruiting: LSU". Scout.; "2008 Player Commitments – LSU". ESPN.; "Scout.com Team Recruiting Rankings". Scout.; "2008 Team Ranking". Rivals.com.

=== Key losses ===
Offense

- Matt Flynn, QB Drafted by the Green Bay Packers in the seventh round (209th overall) of the 2008 NFL draft.
- Jacob Hester, FB/RB Drafted by the San Diego Chargers in the third round (69th overall) of the 2008 NFL Draft.
- Early Doucet, WR Drafted by the Arizona Cardinals in the third round (81st overall) of the 2008 NFL Draft.
- Ryan Perrilloux Dismissed from team February 18, 2008; team policy violations.

Defense

- Glenn Dorsey, DT Drafted by the Kansas City Chiefs fifth overall in the 2008 NFL Draft.
- Craig Steltz, SS Drafted by the Chicago Bears in the fourth round (120th overall) of the 2008 NFL Draft.
- Ali Highsmith, LB Signed with the Arizona Cardinals as a rookie free-agent for a two-year deal.

== Schedule ==
Date	Time	Opponent	Rank	Site	TV	Result	Attendance
August 30	10:00 a.m.	No. 1 (FCS) Appalachian State*	No. 7	Tiger Stadium; Baton Rouge, LA	ESPN Classic	W 41–13	91,922
September 13	7:00 p.m.	North Texas*	No. 7	Tiger Stadium; Baton Rouge, LA	PPV	W 41–3	91,602
September 20	6:45 p.m.	at No. 10 Auburn	No. 6	Jordan–Hare Stadium; Auburn, AL (Tiger Bowl) (College GameDay)	ESPN	W 26–21	87,451
September 27	6:30 p.m.	Mississippi State	No. 5	Tiger Stadium; Baton Rouge, LA (rivalry)	ESPN2	W 34–24	92,710
October 11	7:00 p.m.	at No. 11 Florida	No. 4	Ben Hill Griffin Stadium; Gainesville, FL (rivalry)	CBS	L 21–51	90,684
October 18	7:00 p.m.	at South Carolina	No. 13	Williams-Brice Stadium; Columbia, SC	ESPN	W 24–17	82,477
October 25	2:30 p.m.	No. 9 Georgia	No. 11	Tiger Stadium; Baton Rouge, LA	CBS	L 38–52	92,904
November 1	7:00 p.m.	Tulane*	No. 15	Tiger Stadium; Baton Rouge, LA (Battle for the Rag)	PPV	W 35–10	92,136
November 8	2:30 p.m.	No. 1 Alabama	No. 15	Tiger Stadium; Baton Rouge, LA (rivalry) (College GameDay)	CBS	L 21–27 ^{OT}	93,039^{A}
November 15	7:00 p.m.	Troy*^{†}	No. 19	Tiger Stadium; Baton Rouge, LA	PPV	W 40–31	92,103
November 22	2:30 p.m.	Ole Miss	No. 18	Tiger Stadium; Baton Rouge, LA (Magnolia Bowl)	CBS	L 13–31	92,649
November 28	1:30 p.m.	at Arkansas		War Memorial Stadium; Little Rock, AR (rivalry)	CBS	L 30–31	55,325
December 31	7:30 p.m.	vs. No. 14 Georgia Tech*		Georgia Dome; Atlanta, GA (Chick-fil-A Bowl)	ESPN	W 38–3	71,423
*Non-conference game; ^{†}Homecoming; Rankings from AP Poll released prior to the game; All times are in Central time

- ^ADenotes the largest crowd to watch a football game at Tiger Stadium

Schedule Source: 2008 LSU Tigers football schedule

== Rankings ==
Ranking movements Legend: ██ Increase in ranking ██ Decrease in ranking — = Not ranked
	Week															
Poll	Pre	1	2	3	4	5	6	7	8	9	10	11	12	13	14	Final
AP	7	7	7	6	5	3	4	13	11	15	15	19	18	—	—	—
Coaches	6	6	7	6	6	2	3	14	11	15	15	20	18	—	—	—
Harris	Not released					2	2	12	11	16	15	19	18	—	—	Not released
BCS	Not released								13	19	16	20	18	—	—	Not released

== Game summaries ==
=== Appalachian State ===
Team	1	2	3	4	Total
Appalachian State	0	0	7	6	13
• LSU	14	17	3	7	41

- Location: Baton Rouge, Louisiana
- Game start: 10:06 a.m.
- Elapsed time: 3:09
- Game attendance: 91,922
- Game weather: 65% humidity, sunny
- Referee: Matt Austin
- TV announcers (ESPN Classic): Sean McDonough (play-by-play), Chris Spielman – (analyst), Rob Stone – (sideline reporter)

=== North Texas ===
Team	1	2	3	4	Total
North Texas	0	3	0	0	3
• LSU	10	17	14	0	41

- Location: Baton Rouge, Louisiana
- Game start: 7:00 p.m.
- Elapsed time: 2:54
- Game attendance: 91,602
- Game weather: Gusts to 25
- Referee: Hubert Owens
- TV announcers (TigerVision): Doug Greengard, (play-by-play), Rene Nadeau, – (analyst), Kevin Guidry, – (sideline reporter)

=== Auburn ===
	1	2	3	4	Total
Louisiana State	3	0	14	9	26
Auburn	0	14	0	7	21

=== Mississippi State ===
	1	2	3	4	Total
Mississippi State	3	7	0	14	24
Louisiana State	10	7	10	7	34

=== Florida ===
	1	2	3	4	Total
Louisiana State	0	7	7	7	21
Florida	17	3	14	17	51

=== South Carolina ===
	1	2	3	4	Total
Louisiana State	3	7	7	7	24
South Carolina	0	17	0	0	17

=== Georgia ===
	1	2	3	4	Total
Georgia	14	10	14	14	52
Louisiana State	7	10	7	14	38

=== Tulane ===
	1	2	3	4	Total
Tulane	3	0	0	7	10
Louisiana State	7	14	7	7	35

=== Alabama ===
	1	2	3	4	OT	Total
Alabama	7	7	7	0	6	27
Louisiana State	14	0	0	7	0	21

=== Troy ===
Game delayed due to effects from Hurricane Gustav from originally scheduled date of September 6.

Team	1	2	3	4	Total
Troy	14	10	7	0	31
• LSU	3	0	7	30	40

- Location: Baton Rouge, Louisiana
- Game start: 7:00 p.m.
- Elapsed time: 3:43
- Game attendance: 92,103
- Game weather: Clear, 45% humidity
- Referee: Hubert Owens
- TV announcers (Tigervision): Doug Greengard, (play-by-play), Rene Nadeau, – (analyst), Kevin Guidry, – (sideline reporter)

Trailing 31–3 midway through the third quarter, the Bengals staged one of the greatest comebacks in LSU history, scoring 37 consecutive points and rallying for a 40–31 win.

=== Ole Miss ===
	1	2	3	4	Total
Ole Miss	7	14	7	3	31
Louisiana State	0	10	3	0	13

=== Arkansas ===
	1	2	3	4	Total
Louisiana State	3	17	10	0	30
Arkansas	7	7	10	7	31

=== Chick-fil-A Bowl ===
	1	2	3	4	Total
Louisiana State	7	28	3	0	38
Georgia Tech	3	0	0	0	3

A 28-point 2nd quarter by LSU was too much for the Yellow Jackets to overcome in the 2008 Chick-fil-A Bowl rout. Georgia Tech gave up three turnovers and did not force any.

== Statistics ==
=== Team ===
	Team	Opp
Scoring	402	314
Points per Game	30.92	24.15
First Downs	254	211
Rushing	122	76
Passing	114	114
Penalty	18	21
Rushing Yardage	2168	1432
Yards gained	2510	1751
Yards lost	342	319
Attempts	495	421
Average per rush	4.4	3.4
Average per Game	166.8	110.2
TDs Rushing	27	17
Passing yardage	2168	1432
Att-Comp-Int	391–206–18	391–206–18
Average Per Pass	6.7	6.6
Average Per Catch	12.7	12.3
Average per Game	201.3	215.4
TDs Passing	21	15

	Team	Opp
Total Offense	4785	4232
Avg per Play	5.4	5.0
Avg per Game	368.1	325.5
Fumbles-Lost	16.2	26–11
Penalties-Yards	82–649	75–637
Avg per Game	49.9	49.0
Punts-Yards	63-2538	75-3124
Avg per Punt	40.3	41.7
Time of Possession/Game	30:13	29:47
3rd Down Conversions	70/183	57/183
4th Down Conversions	7/18	9/22
Touchdowns Scored	50	39
Field Goals-Attempts	18–23	14–19
PAT-Attempts	48–49	38–38
Attendance	739,065	315,937
Games/Avg per Game	8 / 92,383	4 / 78,984

==== Scores by quarter ====
	1	2	3	4	OT	Total
LSU	81	134	92	95	0	402
Opponents	75	92	66	75	6	314

=== Offense ===
==== Rushing ====
Name	GP-GS	Att	Gain	Loss	Net	Avg	TD	Long	Avg/G
Charles Scott	13–13	217	1208	34	1174	5.4	18	56	90.3
Keiland Williams	13–0	83	444	27	417	5.0	2	25	32.1
Richard Murphy	13–0	44	202	16	186	4.2	0	12	14.3
Jordan Jefferson	7–2	49	211	77	134	2.7	1	20	19.1
Andrew Hatch	6–3	35	175	46	129	3.7	2	20	21.5
Trindon Holliday	13–0	21	131	17	114	5.4	0	39	8.8
Stevan Ridley	13–0	12	92	0	92	7.7	1	18	7.1
Quinn Johnson	13–10	14	30	2	28	2.0	3	5	2.2
Josh Jasper	13–0	1	7	0	7	7.0	0	7	0.5
Brandon LaFell	13–12	2	6	0	6	3.0	0	4	0.5
Jared Mitchell	12–0	1	0	4	−4	−4.0	0	0	−0.3
TEAM	7–0	5	0	18	−18	−3.6	0	0	−2.6
Jarrett Lee	11–8	11	4	101	−97	−8.8	0	4	−8.8
Total	13	495	2510	342	2168	4.4	27	56	166.8
Opponents	13	421	1751	319	1432	3.4	17	68	110.2

==== Passing ====
Name	GP-GS	Effic	Att-Cmp-Int	Pct	Yds	TD	Lng	Avg/G
Jarrett Lee	11–8	116.9	143–269–16	53.2	1873	14	66	170.3
Jordan Jefferson	7–2	112.9	36–73–1	49.3	419	4	41	59.9
Andrew Hatch	6–3	118.4	25–45–1	55.6	282	2	29	47.0
Brady Dalfrey	13–0	138.2	1–2–0	50.0	21	0	21	1.6
Keiland Williams	13–0	307.4	1–2–0	50.0	22	1	22	1.7
Total	13	117.4	206–391–18	52.7	2617	21	66	201.3
Opponents	13	116.6	227–425–8	53.4	2800	15	70	215.4

==== Receiving ====
Name	GP-GS	No.	Yds	Avg	TD	Long	Avg/G
Brandon LaFell	13–12	63	929	14.7	8	43	71.5
Demetrius Byrd	13–11	27	513	13.9	4	43	39.5
Richard Dickson	13–13	31	324	10.5	5	25	24.9
Terrance Toliver	13–2	22	257	11.7	1	33	19.8
Keiland Williams	13–0	11	124	11.3	1	66	9.5
Richard Murphy	13–0	10	92	9.2	0	28	7.1
Jared Mitchell	12–0	9	106	11.8	0	21	8.8
Chris Mitchell	13–4	8	67	8.4	0	14	5.2
Charles Scott	13–0	10	92	9.2	0	28	7.1
Quinn Johnson	13–10	2	33	16.5	0	15	2.5
Trindon Holliday	13–0	2	33	16.5	0	21	2.5
Chad Jones	13–6	1	21	21.0	0	21	1.6
Ricky Dixon	10–0	1	4	4.0	0	4	0.4
R.J Jackson	11–0	1	−1	−1.0	0	15	−0.1
Total	13	206	2617	12.7	21	66	201.3
Opponents	13	227	2800	12.3	15	70	215.4

=== Defense ===
Name	GP	Tackles				Sacks	Pass defense				Fumbles		Blkd Kick
Name	GP	Solo	Ast	Total	TFL-Yds	No-Yds	Int-Yds	BU	PD	Qbh	Rcv-Yds	FF	Blkd Kick
Total	13	441	480	921	75–293	28–172	8–51	61	69	44	11–57	14	2

=== Special teams ===
Name	Punting								Kickoffs				
Name	No.	Yds	Avg	Long	TB	FC	I20	Blkd	No.	Yds	Avg	TB	OB
Brady Dalfrey	59	2366	40.1	59	3	20	22	0					
Josh Jasper	4	172	43.0	45	0	2	0	0	76	4629	60.9	4	1
Total	63	2538	40.3	59	3	22	23	0	76	4629	60.9	4	1

Name	Punt returns					Kick returns				
Name	No.	Yds	Avg	TD	Long	No.	Yds	Avg	TD	Long
Trindon Holliday	21	279	13.3	1	92	27	609	22.6	0	49
Chad Jones	8	95	11.9	0	24	2	25	12.5	0	17
Patrick Peterson	1	6	6.0	0	6					
Keiland Williams						13	290	22.3	0	38
Kelvin Sheppard						4	47	11.8	0	23
Quinn Johnson						2	14	7.0	0	12
Will Blackwell						2	11	5.5	0	7
Brandon Lafell						1	10	10	0	10
Ron Brooks						1	23	23.0	0	23
T-Bob Hebert						1	13	13.0	0	13
TEAM	1	0	0.0	0	0	1	11	11.0	0	0
Total	31	380	12.3	1	92	54	1053	19.5	0	49

=== Roster ===
2008 LSU Tigers roster
Quarterbacks: 9 Jordan Jefferson – Freshman; 12 Jarrett Lee – (redshirt) Freshman; 14 Andrew Hatch – Sophomore; 17 T. C. McCartney – (redshirt) Freshman; Kyle Ridley – Freshman; Paul Scioneaux – Sophomore; Running backs: 5 Keiland Williams – Junior; 24 Patrick Lipoma – Junior; 26 Richard Murphy – (redshirt) Sophomore; 32 Charles Scott – Senior; 33 Orlando Gunn – (redshirt) Freshman; 37 Phillip Pigott – Senior; Fullbacks: 27 August Mangin – Junior; 30 Chad Baniecki – Senior; 34 Stevan Ridley – (redshirt) Freshman; 42 Steele Hull – Freshman; 45 Quinn Johnson – (redshirt) Senior; Wide receivers: 1 Brandon LaFell – (redshirt) Junior; 2 Demetrius Byrd – Senior; 8 Trindon Holliday – Junior; 10 Ricky Dixon – Sophomore; 13 Jordan Newell – Sophomore; 16 Jhyryn Taylor – Freshman; 19 DeAngelo Peterson – Freshman; 21 Chris Tolliver – Freshman; 27 Jarred Joseph – Freshman; 28 R.J. Jackson – (redshirt) Junior; 31 John Williams – (redshirt) Freshman; 39 R.J. Gillen – (redshirt) Freshman; 39 Ian Harding – (redshirt) Freshman; 43 Tim Molton – Freshman; 58 Adam McClure – Sophomore; 80 Terrance Toliver – Sophomore; 86 Chris Mitchell – Junior; 87 Jared Mitchell – Junior	Tight ends: 18 Richard Dickson – Junior; 40 Caleb Angelle – (redshirt) Senior; 41 Ronnie Turpin – Freshman; 46 Tyler Edwards – Freshman; 82 Matt Branch – Freshman; 83 Mitch Joseph – (redshirt) Freshman; 84 Jake Bryan – Freshman; 85 Alex Russian – (redshirt) Freshman; Offensive line: 51 Clay Spencer – Freshman; 60 Will Blackwell – (redshirt) Freshman; 61 Trey Helms – (redshirt) Freshman; 64 P.J. Lonergan – Freshman; 67 Tyler Simmons – Freshman; 68 Josh Dworaczyk – (redshirt) Freshman; 70 Ciron Black – Junior; 72 Alex Hurst – Freshman; 73 Thomas Parsons – Freshman; 75 Greg Shaw – Freshman; 77 Ernest McCoy – (redshirt) Freshman; 78 Joseph Barksdale – Sophomore; 79 Herman Johnson – Senior; Offensive guards: 65 Lyle Hitt – Junior; Centers: 53 T-Bob Hebert – (redshirt) Freshman; 62 Richard Dugas – Sophomore; 63 Ryan Miller – Senior; 74 Brett Helms – Senior; Long snappers: 49 Austin Kinchen – Freshman; 50 Joey Crappell – (redshirt) Freshman; Justin Warner – Freshman	Defensive line: 97 Dennis Johnson – Sophomore; Defensive ends: 47 Tremaine Johnson – Senior; 49 Kirston Pittman – (redshirt) Senior; 53 Jonathan Nixon – (redshirt) Sophomore; 81 Chancey Aghayere – Freshman; 84 Rahim Alem – Junior; 88 Chase Clement – Freshman; 93 Tyson Jackson – Senior; 95 Lazarius Levingston – Sophomore; 98 Sidell Corley – (redshirt) Freshman; Defensive tackles: 71 Cordian Hagans – Freshman; 88 Donald Hains – (redshirt) Senior; 89 Lavar Edwards – Freshman; 90 Ricky Jean Francois – Junior; 91 Charles Alexander – Senior; 92 Drake Nevis – Sophomore; 96 Kentravis Aubrey – (redshirt) Freshman; 97 Al Woods – Junior; 99 Marlon Favorite – Senior; Linebackers: 11 Kelvin Sheppard – (redshirt) Sophomore; 17 Shomari Clemons – (redshirt) Freshman; 22 Ryan Baker – Freshman; 32 David Impastato – Junior; 41 Kyle Prater – Freshman; 48 Darry Beckwith – Senior; 52 Ace Foyil – Junior; 53 Paul Felio – Sophomore; 54 Jacob Cutrera – Junior; 55 Kellen Theriot – Freshman; 56 Perry Riley – Junior; 57 Harold Butcher – Freshman	Defensive backs: 16 Trent Hebert – (redshirt) Freshman; 19 David Detz – Freshman; 45 Zach Elkins – Sophomore; Cornerbacks: 4 Jai Eugene – (redshirt) Sophomore; 7 Patrick Peterson – Freshman; 13 Ron Brooks – (redshirt) Freshman; 15 Brandon Taylor – Freshman; 25 Phelon Jones – (redshirt) Freshman; 28 Joe Maltempi – Junior; 29 Chris Hawkins – Junior; 33 Daniel Graff – (redshirt) Junior; 35 Ryan St. Julien – Freshman; 36 Derrick Bryant – Freshman; Safeties: 3 Chad Jones – Sophomore; 5 Chad Moody – Junior; 23 Stefoin François – (redshirt) Freshman; 24 Harry Coleman – Junior; 27 Curtis Taylor – Senior; 37 Karnell Hatcher – Freshman; 44 Danny McCray – Junior; Punters: 38 Drew Alleman – K/P – Freshman; 39 Brady Dalfrey – (redshirt) Senior; Kickers: 6 Colt David – Senior; 17 Josh Graham – Junior; 30 Josh Jasper – Sophomore; 38 Drew Alleman – K/P – Freshman; 39 Andrew Crutchfield – Sophomore

2008 Louisiana State University Football Roster and Bios

== Coaching staff ==
Name	Title	First year at LSU	Alma mater
Les Miles	Head coach	2005	Michigan (1976)
Gary Crowton	Offensive coordinator	2007	BYU (1983)
Doug Mallory	Co-defensive coordinator	2005	Michigan (1988)
Bradley Dale Peveto	Co-defensive coordinator	2005	SMU (1987)
Josh Henson	Tight ends coach/recruiting coordinator	2005	Oklahoma State (1998)
Earl Lane	Defensive line coach	2006	Northwood
TBD	Defensive backs coach		
D.J. McCarthy	Wide receivers coach	2007	Washington (1994)
Joe Robinson	Special teams coordinator	2008	Louisiana State University (1985)
Larry Porter	Asst. head coach/running backs/special teams	2005	Memphis (1996)
Greg Studrawa	Offensive line coach	2007	Bowling Green (1987)
Tommy Moffitt	Strength and conditioning coordinator	2000	Tennessee Tech (1986)

== LSU Tigers in the 2009 National Football League Draft ==
Player	Position	Round	Pick	Overall	NFL team
Tyson Jackson	Defensive end	1	3	3	Kansas City Chiefs
Quinn Johnson	Running back	5	9	145	Green Bay Packers
Herman Johnson	Offensive guard	5	31	167	Arizona Cardinals
Curtis Taylor	Safety	7	10	219	San Francisco 49ers
Demetrius Byrd	Wide receiver	7	15	224	San Diego Chargers
Ricky Jean-Francois	Defensive tackle	7	35	244	San Francisco 49ers
