= 2009 LSU Tigers football team =

American college football season

2009 LSU Tigers football

Capital One Bowl, L 17–19 vs. Penn State
- Conference: Southeastern Conference
- Western Division

Ranking
- Coaches: No. 17
- AP: No. 17
- Record: 9–4 (5–3 SEC)
- Head coach: Les Miles (5th season)
- Offensive coordinator: Gary Crowton (3rd season)
- Offensive scheme: Pro-style
- Defensive coordinator: John Chavis (1st season)
- Base defense: 4–3
- Home stadium: Tiger Stadium

Uniform

2009 Southeastern Conference football standings
	Conf.			Overall
Team	W		L	W		L
Eastern Division
No. 3 Florida x%	8	–	0	13	–	1
Georgia	4	–	4	8	–	5
Tennessee	4	–	4	7	–	6
Kentucky	3	–	5	7	–	6
South Carolina	3	–	5	7	–	6
Vanderbilt	0	–	8	2	–	10
Western Division
No. 1 Alabama x$#	8	–	0	14	–	0
No. 17 LSU	5	–	3	9	–	4
No. 20 Ole Miss	4	–	4	9	–	4
Arkansas	3	–	5	8	–	5
Auburn	3	–	5	8	–	5
Mississippi State	3	–	5	5	–	7
Championship: Alabama 32, Florida 13
# – BCS National Champion; $ – BCS representative as conference champion; % – BCS at-large representative; x – Division champion/co-champions; Rankings from AP Poll

The 2009 LSU Tigers football team represented Louisiana State University in the 2009 NCAA Division I FBS football season. The team's head coach was Les Miles who served his fifth year at the helm of LSU football. They played their home games at Tiger Stadium in Baton Rouge, Louisiana. The Tigers finished the season 9–4, 5–3 in SEC play, including a loss in the Capital One Bowl, 19–17, against Penn State.

== Before the season ==
=== Coaching changes ===
Following the 2008 season, co-defensive coordinators, Doug Mallory & Bradley Dale Peveto both left LSU. Mallory moved on to New Mexico to become defensive coordinator of the Lobos' football program, while Peveto took over as the head coach of the Northwestern State Demons. The Tigers replaced Mallory and Peveto with new defensive coordinator John Chavis, who left the University of Tennessee after the departure of head coach Phillip Fulmer. Chavis was a Tennessee alum and held the position of defensive coordinator there since 1995. Chavis will also coach linebackers at LSU.

Ron Cooper was hired as the new defensive backs coach. Previously, Mallory had coached the defensive backs since 2005. Cooper came to LSU from the University of South Carolina where he spent the past five years coaching on the defensive side of the football.

Earl Lane also left LSU following the 2008. Lane spent 3 seasons as defensive line coach at LSU, but decided it was time to move on. Lane was replaced by Brick Haley. Haley was brought aboard as a veteran defensive line coach who has spent time in both the NFL and the Southeastern Conference.

Finally, Josh Henson, who left to become co-offensive line coach for Missouri, was replaced by Don Yanowsky. Henson came to LSU with Miles in 2005 and served as the Tight Ends coach and recruiting coordinator for the Tigers. Henson has a reputation as of being one of the best recruiters in the nation. Yanowsky will also serve as the Tight Ends coach and Recruiting coordinator, and comes to LSU from Boston College.

=== Key losses ===
Offense

- Demetrius Byrd, WR Drafted in the 7th round of the 2009 NFL draft by the San Diego Chargers.
- Brett Helms, C Signed with the Houston Texans as a rookie free agent.
- Quinn Johnson, FB Drafted in the 5th round of the 2009 NFL Draft by the Green Bay Packers.
- Herman Johnson, OG Drafted in the 5th round of the 2009 NFL Draft by the Arizona Cardinals.

Defense

- Darry Beckwith, LB Signed with the San Diego Chargers as a rookie free agent.
- Marlon Favorite, DT Signed with the Carolina Panthers as a rookie free agent.
- Tyson Jackson, DL Drafted 3rd overall in the 2009 NFL Draft by the Kansas City Chiefs.
- Ricky Jean-Francois, DT Drafted in the 7th round of the 2009 NFL Draft by the San Francisco 49ers.
- Kirston Pittman, DE Signed with the St. Louis Rams as a rookie free agent, but later released with an injury settlement
- Curtis Taylor, S Drafted in the 7th round of the 2009 NFL Draft by the Green Bay Packers.

Special teams

- Colt David, PK All-time scoring leader for the LSU Tigers.

=== Returning starters ===
Offense

Player	Class	Position
Joseph Barksdale	Junior	Offensive Tackle
Ciron Black	Senior	Offensive Tackle
Richard Dickson	Senior	Tight End
Lyle Hitt	Senior	Offensive Guard
Brandon LaFell	Senior	Wide Receiver
Charles Scott	Senior	Running Back

Defense

Player	Class	Position
Charles Alexander	Senior	Defensive tackle
Harry Coleman	Senior	Linebacker/Safety
Chad Jones	Junior	Safety
Patrick Peterson	Sophomore	Cornerback
Perry Riley	Senior	Linebacker
Kelvin Sheppard	Junior	Linebacker

=== 2009 recruiting class ===
College recruiting (2009)
Name	Hometown	School	Height	Weight	40^{‡}	Commit date
Carneal Ainsworth; OL	Baton Rouge, LA	Parkview Baptist High School	6 ft 4 in (1.93 m)	296 lb (134 kg)	5.2	Jun 11, 2008
Carneal Ainsworth; OL	Recruit ratings: Scout: Rivals: (78)					
Domimique Allen; FB	Paris, TN	Henry County High School	5 ft 11 in (1.80 m)	250 lb (110 kg)		Nov 16, 2008
Domimique Allen; FB	Recruit ratings: Scout: Rivals: (78)					
Lamin Barrow; LB	Marrero, LA	John Ehret High School	6 ft 2 in (1.88 m)	209 lb (95 kg)	4.65	Nov 20, 2008
Lamin Barrow; LB	Recruit ratings: Scout: Rivals: (76)					
Michael Brockers; DE	Houston, TX	Cesar E. Chavez High School	6 ft 6 in (1.98 m)	260 lb (120 kg)	5.00	Feb 22, 2008
Michael Brockers; DE	Recruit ratings: Scout: Rivals: (79)					
Drayton Calhoun; ATH	Tucker, GA	Tucker High School	6 ft 0 in (1.83 m)	175 lb (79 kg)	4.48	Feb 26, 2008
Drayton Calhoun; ATH	Recruit ratings: Scout: Rivals: (81)					
Morris Claiborne; ATH	Shreveport, LA	Fair Park High School	6 ft 0 in (1.83 m)	180 lb (82 kg)	4.45	Nov 11, 2008
Morris Claiborne; ATH	Recruit ratings: Scout: Rivals: (80)					
Chris Davenport; DT	Mansfield, LA	Mansfield High School	6 ft 4 in (1.93 m)	318 lb (144 kg)	5.14	Jan 23, 2008
Chris Davenport; DT	Recruit ratings: Scout: Rivals: (83)					
Joshua Downs; DT	Bastrop, LA	Bastrop High School	6 ft 2 in (1.88 m)	270 lb (120 kg)		Feb 23, 2008
Joshua Downs; DT	Recruit ratings: Scout: Rivals: (83)					
Chris Faulk; OT	Slidell, LA	North Shore High School	6 ft 6 in (1.98 m)	305 lb (138 kg)	4.9	May 21, 2008
Chris Faulk; OT	Recruit ratings: Scout: Rivals: (75)					
Michael Ford; RB	Leesville, LA	Leesville High School	5 ft 10 in (1.78 m)	205 lb (93 kg)	4.5	Feb 22, 2008
Michael Ford; RB	Recruit ratings: Scout: Rivals: (81)					
Chris Garrett; QB	Tupelo, MS	Tupelo High School	6 ft 4 in (1.93 m)	222 lb (101 kg)	4.9	Mar 26, 2008
Chris Garrett; QB	Recruit ratings: Scout: Rivals: (78)					
Derek Helton; K	Hoyt, KS	Fort Scott Community College	6 ft 2 in (1.88 m)	170 lb (77 kg)		Nov 14, 2008
Derek Helton; K	Recruit ratings: Scout: Rivals: (N/A)					
Akiem Hicks; DT	Elk Grove, CA	Sacramento City College	6 ft 6 in (1.98 m)	300 lb (140 kg)	4.89	Nov 9, 2008
Akiem Hicks; DT	Recruit ratings: Scout: Rivals: (N/A)					
Josh Johns; S	Baton Rouge, LA	Central High School	6 ft 2 in (1.88 m)	210 lb (95 kg)	4.5	Feb 4, 2009
Josh Johns; S	Recruit ratings: Scout: Rivals: (77)					
Tahj Jones; LB	Sulphur, LA	Sulphur High School	6 ft 2 in (1.88 m)	200 lb (91 kg)	4.6	Feb 2, 2009
Tahj Jones; LB	Recruit ratings: Scout: Rivals: (78)					
Bennie Logan; DE	Coushatta, LA	Red River High School	6 ft 3 in (1.91 m)	230 lb (100 kg)	4.7	Jan 26, 2009
Bennie Logan; DE	Recruit ratings: Scout: Rivals: (76)					
Craig Loston; S	Aldine, TX	Dwight D. Eisenhower High School	6 ft 2 in (1.88 m)	193 lb (88 kg)	4.5	Jan 2, 2009
Craig Loston; S	Recruit ratings: Scout: Rivals: (90)					
Stavion Lowe; OG	Brownsville, TX	Brownsville High School	6 ft 6 in (1.98 m)	294 lb (133 kg)	5.0	Jul 13, 2008
Stavion Lowe; OG	Recruit ratings: Scout: Rivals: (81)					
Barkevious Mingo; LB	West Monroe, LA	West Monroe High School	6 ft 5 in (1.96 m)	210 lb (95 kg)	4.5	Feb 4, 2009
Barkevious Mingo; LB	Recruit ratings: Scout: Rivals: (78)					
Kevin Minter; LB	Suwanee, GA	Peachtree Ridge High School	6 ft 0 in (1.83 m)	230 lb (100 kg)	4.6	Apr 5, 2008
Kevin Minter; LB	Recruit ratings: Scout: Rivals: (81)					
Sam Montgomery; DE	Greenwood, SC	Greenwood High School	6 ft 4 in (1.93 m)	230 lb (100 kg)	4.4	Feb 4, 2009
Sam Montgomery; DE	Recruit ratings: Scout: Rivals: (84)					
Rueben Randle; WR	Bastrop, LA	Bastrop High School	6 ft 3 in (1.91 m)	195 lb (88 kg)	4.5	Feb 4, 2009
Rueben Randle; WR	Recruit ratings: Scout: Rivals: (86)					
Russell Shepard; ATH	Houston, TX	Cypress Ridge High School	6 ft 1 in (1.85 m)	180 lb (82 kg)		Mar 3, 2009
Russell Shepard; ATH	Recruit ratings: Scout: Rivals: (92)					
Josh Willford; OG	Dothan, AL	Houston High School	6 ft 7 in (2.01 m)	345 lb (156 kg)	5.27	Jul 18, 2009
Josh Willford; OG	Recruit ratings: Scout: Rivals: (75)					
Overall recruit ranking: Scout: 3 Rivals: 2 ESPN: 1
‡ Refers to 40-yard dash; Note: In many cases, Scout, Rivals, 247Sports, On3, and ESPN may conflict in their listings of height, weight and 40 time.; In these cases, the average was taken. ESPN grades are on a 100-point scale.; Sources: "2009 Player Signees- LSU". ESPN.; "2009 Team Ranking". Rivals.com.

=== Spring game ===
The Tigers held their annual spring game on Saturday April 18, 2009. LSU White defeated LSU Purple 27–0.

=== Pre-season All-SEC honors ===
- Rahim Alem, third-team DL
- Charles Alexander, second-team DL
- Ciron Black, first-team OL
- Richard Dickson, first-team TE
- Trindon Holiday, third-team RS
- Chad Jones, second-team DB
- Brandon Lafell, second-team WR
- Perry Riley, third-team LB
- Charles Scott, first-team RB
- Terrance Toliver, third-team WR

=== Pre-season watch lists ===
- Rahim Alem – 2009 Ted Hendricks Award and Bednarik Award Watch Lists
- Ciron Black – 2009 Outland Trophy Watch List
- Richard Dickson – 2009 John Mackey Award Watch List
- Jordan Jefferson – 2009 Davey O'Brien National Quarterback Award Watch List
- Brandon LaFell – 2009 Biletnikoff Award and Maxwell Award Watch Lists
- Charles Scott – 2009 Doak Walker Award and Maxwell Award Watch Lists

== Schedule ==
Date	Time	Opponent	Rank	Site	TV	Result	Attendance
September 5	9:30 p.m.	at Washington*	No. 11	Husky Stadium; Seattle, WA	ESPN	W 31–23	69,161
September 12	6:00 p.m.	Vanderbilt	No. 11	Tiger Stadium; Baton Rouge, LA	ESPNU	W 23–9	91,566
September 19	6:00 p.m.	Louisiana-Lafayette*	No. 9	Tiger Stadium; Baton Rouge, LA	ESPNU	W 31–3	92,443
September 26	11:21 a.m.	at Mississippi State	No. 7	Davis Wade Stadium; Starkville, MS (rivalry)	SECN	W 30–26	53,612
October 3	2:30 p.m.	at No. 14 Georgia	No. 4	Sanford Stadium; Athens, GA	CBS	W 20–13	92,746
October 10	7:00 p.m.	No. 1 Florida	No. 4	Tiger Stadium; Baton Rouge, LA (rivalry) (College GameDay)	CBS	L 3–13	93,129
October 24	6:30 p.m.	Auburn	No. 9	Tiger Stadium; Baton Rouge, LA (Tiger Bowl)	ESPN2	W 31–10	92,654
October 31	7:00 p.m.	Tulane*	No. 9	Tiger Stadium; Baton Rouge, LA (Battle for the Rag)	PPV	W 42–0	92,031
November 7	2:30 p.m.	at No. 3 Alabama	No. 9	Bryant–Denny Stadium; Tuscaloosa, AL (rivalry)	CBS	L 15–24	92,012
November 14	6:00 p.m.	Louisiana Tech*^{†}	No. 9	Tiger Stadium; Baton Rouge, LA	ESPNU	W 24–16	92,584
November 21	2:30 p.m.	at Ole Miss	No. 10	Vaught–Hemingway Stadium; Oxford, MS (Magnolia Bowl)	CBS	L 23–25	61,752
November 28	6:00 p.m.	Arkansas	No. 17	Tiger Stadium; Baton Rouge, LA (Battle for the Golden Boot)	ESPN	W 33–30 ^{OT}	93,013
January 1, 2010	1:00 p.m.	vs. No. 11 Penn State*	No. 13	Citrus Bowl; Orlando, FL (Capital One Bowl)	ABC	L 17–19	63,025
*Non-conference game; ^{†}Homecoming; Rankings from AP Poll released prior to the game; All times are in Central time

== Game summaries ==
=== Washington ===
	1	2	3	4	Total
Tigers	10	7	7	7	31
Huskies	7	6	0	10	23

=== Vanderbilt ===
	1	2	3	4	Total
Commodores	0	7	2	0	9
Tigers	7	6	3	7	23

=== Louisiana-Lafayette ===
- LSU improved to 22–0 all-time against the Ragin Cajuns.

	1	2	3	4	Total
Ragin Cajuns	0	3	0	0	3
Tigers	7	10	7	7	31

=== Mississippi St. ===
- LSU has now beaten Mississippi State 10 straight times.

	1	2	3	4	Total
Tigers	13	3	7	7	30
Bulldogs	14	0	7	5	26

=== #14 Georgia ===
- LSU beats Georgia in Athens for the first time since 1987.

	1	2	3	4	Total
Tigers	3	3	0	14	20
Bulldogs	0	0	0	13	13

=== #1 Florida ===
- Largest crowd ever in Tiger Stadium

	1	2	3	4	Total
Gators	3	7	0	3	13
Tigers	0	3	0	0	3

=== Auburn ===
- LSU beats Auburn for the third straight year.
- Marks the start of the longest active home winning streak in college football.

	1	2	3	4	Total
Auburn	0	0	3	7	10
LSU	14	3	14	0	31

=== Tulane ===
- LSU beats the Green Wave for the 18th straight time.

	1	2	3	4	Total
Green Wave	0	0	0	0	0
Tigers	14	7	7	14	42

=== #3 Alabama ===
- The win marks the first time the Crimson Tide have beaten the Tigers in Tuscaloosa since 1999.

	1	2	3	4	Total
Tigers	0	7	8	0	15
Crimson Tide	0	3	7	14	24

=== Louisiana Tech ===
- With the win, LSU improved to 18–1 all-time against Louisiana Tech.

	1	2	3	4	Total
Bulldogs	3	10	0	3	16
Tigers	10	0	7	7	24

=== Ole Miss ===
- LSU has lost to a Houston Nutt coached team 3 straight times (Arkansas 2007, Ole Miss 2008 & 2009).

	1	2	3	4	Total
Tigers	14	3	0	6	23
Rebels	6	9	0	10	25

=== Arkansas ===
- LSU defeats the Razorbacks for the first time since 2006. The only bright spot for Arkansas is that they were the only team to outscore LSU in the third quarter this year.

	1	2	3	4	OT	Total
Razorbacks	3	3	14	10	0	30
Tigers	10	7	7	6	3	33

=== Penn State–Capital One Bowl ===
	1	2	3	4	Total
Nittany Lions	7	6	3	3	19
Tigers	0	3	7	7	17

== Rankings ==
Ranking movements Legend: ██ Increase in ranking ██ Decrease in ranking
	Week															
Poll	Pre	1	2	3	4	5	6	7	8	9	10	11	12	13	14	Final
AP	11	11	9	7	4	4	10	9	9	9	9	10	17	15	13	17
Coaches	9	9	7	7	4	4	10	10	9	9	11	10	17	14	13	17
Harris	Not released				4	4	9	9	9	9	11	10	16	14	13	Not released
BCS	Not released							9	9	9	8	8	15	13	12	Not released

== Roster ==
2009 LSU Tigers roster
Quarterbacks: 9 Jordan Jefferson – Sophomore; 10 Russell Shepard – Freshman; 12 Jarrett Lee – (redshirt) Sophomore; 14 Chris Garrett – Freshman; 17 T. C. McCartney – (redshirt) Sophomore; Running backs: 5 Keiland Williams – Senior; 8 Trindon Holliday – Senior; 24 Patrick Lipoma – Senior; 25 Drayton Calhoun – Freshman; 26 Richard Murphy – (redshirt) Junior; 32 Charles Scott – Senior; 40 Orlando Gunn – (redshirt) Sophomore; 42 Michael Ford – Freshman; Athlete: 43 Cole Richardson – Freshman; Fullbacks: 27 August Mangin – Senior; 33 Dominique Allen – Freshman; 34 Stevan Ridley – (redshirt) Sophomore; 35 James Stampley – Sophomore; 44 Curtis Sutera – (redshirt) Freshman; 45 Richard Dugas – (redshirt) Junior; 86 Cleveland Davis -Freshman; Wide receivers: 1 Brandon LaFell – (redshirt) Senior; 2 Rueben Randle – Freshman; 13 Jordan Newell – Junior; 16 Jhyryn Taylor – (redshirt) Freshman; 21 Chris Tolliver – (redshirt) Freshman; 28 R.J. Jackson – (redshirt) Senior; 29 Jarred Joseph – (redshirt) Freshman; 31 John Williams – (redshirt) Sophomore; 39 R.J. Gillen – Sophomore; 80 Terrence Toliver – Junior; 82 Karl Acker – Freshman; 86 Chris Mitchell – Senior; 87 Marc Paul – Freshman; 88 Richard Thompson – Senior	Tight ends: 18 Richard Dickson – Senior; 19 DeAngelo Peterson – Sophomore; 41 Ronnie Turpin – (redshirt) Freshman; 47 Tyler Edwards – (redshirt) Freshman; 83 Mitch Joseph – Sophomore; 84 Jake Bryan – (redshirt) Freshman; 85 Alex Russian – '' (redshirt) Sophomore; 89 Greg Ostrom – Freshman; Offensive line: 51 Clay Spencer – (redshirt) Freshman; 53 T-Bob Hebert – Sophomore; 60 Will Blackwell – (redshirt) Sophomore; 61 Ben Domingue – Freshman; 65 Lyle Hitt – (redshirt) Senior; 68 Josh Dworaczyk – (redshirt) Sophomore; 69 Stavion Lowe – Freshman; 70 Ciron Black – (redshirt) Senior; 71 Alex Bonnette – Freshman; 71 Cordian Hagans – (redshirt) Freshman; 72 Alex Hurst – (redshirt) Freshman; 73 Thomas Parsons – (redshirt) Freshman; 74 Josh Williford – Freshman; 75 Greg Shaw – Sophomore; 76 Chris Faulk – Freshman; 78 Joseph Barksdale – Junior; 79 Matt Branch – (redshirt) Freshman; Long snappers: 49 Austin Kinchen – (redshirt) Freshman; 50 Joey Crappell – Sophomore	Defensive line: 50 Chris Davenport – Freshman; 77 Josh Downs – Freshman; 84 Rahim Alem – (redshirt) Senior; 87 Chancey Aghayere – (redshirt) Freshman; 88 Chase Clement – (redshirt) Freshman; 89 Lavar Edwards – (redshirt) Freshman; 90 Michael Brockers – Freshman; 91 Charles Alexander – (redshirt) Senior; 92 Drake Nevis – Junior; 93 Bennie Logan – Freshman; 94 Akiem Hicks – Junior; 95 Lazarius Levingston – (redshirt) Junior; 96 Dwayne Dailey – Sophomore; 97 Al Woods – Senior; 98 Dennis Johnson – (redshirt) Sophomore; 99 Sam Montgomery – Freshman; Linebackers: 11 Kelvin Sheppard – (redshirt) Junior; 52 Archie Kern Jr. - Sophomore; 22 Ryan Baker – Sophomore; 24 Harry Coleman – Senior; 41 Kyle Prater – (redshirt) Freshman; 42 David Impastato – Senior; 46 Kevin Minter – Freshman; 48 Kellen Theriot – (redshirt) Freshman; 49 Barkevious Mingo – Freshman; 51 Michael Johnson – (redshirt) Freshman; 53 Jonathan Nixon – Junior; 54 Jacob Cutrera – Senior; 55 Seth Fruge – Freshman; 56 Perry Riley – Senior; 57 Lamin Barrow – Freshman; 58 Tahj Jones – Freshman; 59 Paul Felio – Sophomore	Defensive backs: 6 Tyler Glynn – Freshman; 6 Craig Loston – Freshman; 17 Morris Claiborne – Freshman; 19 David Detz – (redshirt) Freshman; 21 Tayler Debusk – (redshirt) Freshman; 25 Dexter Alexander – Freshman; 28 Joe Maltempi – Senior; 34 Jimmy Rome – Junior; 35 Ryan St. Julien – (redshirt) Freshman; 36 Derrick Bryant – Sophomore; 37 Karnell Hatcher – Sophomore; 39 Josh Johns – Freshman; 43 Daniel Graff – (redshirt) Junior; 45 Zach Elkins- Junior; Cornerbacks: 4 Jai Eugene – (redshirt) Junior; 7 Patrick Peterson – Sophomore; 15 Brandon Taylor – Sophomore; 29 Chris Hawkins – (redshirt) Senior; Safeties: 3 Chad Jones – Junior; 13 Ron Brooks – (redshirt) Sophomore; 23 Stefoin Francois – (redshirt) Sophomore; 40 Rockey Duplessis – Freshman; 44 Danny McCray – Senior; Punters: 33 DJ Howard – Freshman; 38 Derek Helton – Junior; Kickers: 3 Parker Brown – Freshman; 4 Tyler Listi – Freshman; 30 Trent Hebert – Sophomore; 30 Josh Jasper – Junior; 38 Drew Alleman – (redshirt) Freshman

2009 Louisiana State University Football Roster and Bios http://www.lsusports.net/SportSelect.dbml?&DB_OEM_ID=5200&SPID=2164&SPSID=27812

== Coaching staff ==
Name	Title	First year at LSU	Alma mater
Les Miles	Head coach	2005	Michigan (1976)
Gary Crowton	Offensive coordinator	2007	BYU (1983)
John Chavis	Defensive coordinator	2009	Tennessee (1979)
Don Yanowsky	Tight ends coach/recruiting coordinator	2009	University of Toledo (1980)
Brick Haley	Defensive line coach	2009	Alabama A&M University (1989)
Ron Cooper	Defensive backs coach	2009	Jacksonville State University (1983)
D.J. McCarthy	Wide receivers coach	2007	Washington (1994)
Joe Robinson	Special teams coordinator	2008	Louisiana State University (1985)
Larry Porter	Asst. head coach/running backs/special teams	2005	Memphis (1996)
Greg Studrawa	Offensive line coach	2007	Bowling Green (1987)
Grady Brown	Defensive quality control coach	2009	Alabama A&M (2000)
Tommy Moffitt	Strength and conditioning coordinator	2000	Tennessee Tech (1986)

2009 Louisiana State University Football Coaches and Bios http://www.lsusports.net/SportSelect.dbml?&DB_OEM_ID=5200&SPID=2164&SPSID=28715

== LSU Tigers in the 2010 National Football League Draft ==
Player	Position	Round	Pick	Overall	NFL team
Chad Jones	Defensive back	3	12	76	New York Giants
Brandon LaFell	Wide receiver	3	14	78	Carolina Panthers
Perry Riley	Linebacker	4	5	103	Washington Redskins
Al Woods	Defensive tackle	4	25	123	New Orleans Saints
Trindon Holliday	Wide receiver	6	28	197	Houston Texans
Charles Scott	Running back	6	31	200	Philadelphia Eagles
