= Charles Scott (American football) =

American football player (born 1988)

No. 33
- Position: Running back

Personal information
- Born: August 8, 1988 (age 38); Tampa, Florida, U.S.
- Listed height: 5 ft 11 in (1.80 m)
- Listed weight: 242 lb (110 kg)

Career information
- High school: Jonesboro-Hodge (Jonesboro, Louisiana)
- College: LSU
- NFL draft: 2010: 6th round, 200th overall pick

Career history
- Philadelphia Eagles (2010)*; Arizona Cardinals (2010)*; New York Giants (2010–2011)*
- * Offseason or practice squad member only

Awards and highlights
- BCS national champion (2007); First-team All-SEC (2008)
- Stats at Pro Football Reference

Charles Edward Scott Jr. (born August 8, 1988) is an American former professional football player who was a running back in the National Football League (NFL). He was selected by the Philadelphia Eagles in the sixth round of the 2010 NFL draft. He played college football for the LSU Tigers.

== Early life ==
Scott was born in Tampa, Florida, to Charles and Phyllis Scott. He grew up on Air Force bases, and he earned the nickname "Junior" by his father.

Scott attended to Jonesboro-Hodge High School where he was an All-district performer in baseball, basketball and football. Scott was the Consensus top running back prospect in the state of Louisiana and one of the most highly recruited in the nation, he was named by Scout.com the tenth-best at the running back position and eighth by Rivals.com. He was named State of Louisiana Gatorade Player of the Year.

== College career ==
Scott committed to Louisiana State University in 2006. He made his first collegiate start against Mississippi State and scored two touchdowns. Scott recorded his first career 100-yard rushing game against the Tulane Green Wave, gaining 101 yards and scoring two touchdowns on 15 carries. With his performance against Tulane, he became the quickest true freshman to 100 yards since Kevin Faulk did so in the second game of his career in the 1995 season.

In the 2007 season, at the season opener against Mississippi State, Scott had his first career receiving touchdown from quarterback Matt Flynn. He had a minor role on the Tigers' route to the National Championship, finishing the season with 324 yards on 45 carries for five touchdowns, 7.2 yards per carry and 115 receiving yards on 12 catches and two touchdowns.

In the 2008 season-opener against Appalachian State, Scott ran for a 56-yard run, the first touchdown of the season for the Tigers. He also rushed for a career-best 160 yards and two touchdowns in the game. His 160 rushing yards were the most by an LSU player since Alley Broussard broke the school record with 250 yards against Ole Miss Rebels in 2004. At the week 3 match-up against the Auburn Tigers, his 21-carry, 132-yard performance marked the first 100-yard rusher for LSU at Jordan–Hare Stadium in the school's history. Scott became the first LSU running back to rush for three consecutive 100-yard games since Joseph Addai in 2005. After his performance against Auburn, he was named SEC Offensive Player of the Week and "National Player of the Week" by Rivals.com. Against Mississippi State, Scott became the first LSU player to record four straight 100-yard rushing games since Justin Vincent did so in the final four games of the 2003 season and the school's first player to open a season with four straight 100-yard rushing games since former All-American Charles Alexander. At the end of the season, he finished the regular season with 202 carries for a career-high 1,109 yards and 15 touchdowns to lead the Tigers in rushing, and his 5.5 yards per carry average ranks third in school history for a single season, moving into a tie for third place for LSU single-season rushing touchdowns with 15.

Scott earned first-team All-SEC Coaches honors and second-team All-SEC honors by the Associated Press.

=== Statistics ===
| Year | Team | Games | | Rushing | | | | Receiving | | | |
| Year | Team | GP | GS | Att | Yards | Avg | TD | Rec | Yards | Avg | TD |
|---|---|---|---|---|---|---|---|---|---|---|---|
| 2006 | LSU | 7 | 1 | 46 | 277 | 6.0 | 5 | 3 | 24 | 8.0 | 0 |
| 2007 | LSU | 14 | 0 | 45 | 324 | 7.2 | 5 | 12 | 115 | 9.6 | 2 |
| 2008 | LSU | 13 | 13 | 217 | 1,124 | 5.4 | 18 | 8 | 67 | 8.4 | 0 |
| 2009 | LSU | 9 | 9 | 116 | 542 | 4.7 | 4 | 8 | 54 | 6.4 | 1 |
| Career | | 43 | 23 | 424 | 2,317 | 5.5 | 32 | 31 | 260 | 8.4 | 3 |

== Professional career ==
Pre-draft measurables
| Height | Weight | Arm length | Hand span | 40-yard dash | 10-yard split | 20-yard split | 20-yard shuttle | Three-cone drill | Vertical jump | Broad jump | Bench press |
|---|---|---|---|---|---|---|---|---|---|---|---|
| 5 ft 11 3/8 in (1.81 m) | 238 lb (108 kg) | 33 in (0.84 m) | 9 1/2 in (0.24 m) | 4.53 s | 1.54 s | 2.68 s | 4.47 s | 6.98 s | 31.0 in (0.79 m) | 9 ft 6 in (2.90 m) | 17 reps |
All values from NFL Combine/Pro Day

=== Philadelphia Eagles ===
Scott was selected by the Philadelphia Eagles in the sixth round (200th overall) in the 2010 NFL draft. He was signed to a four-year, $1.88 million contract on June 2, 2010.

=== Arizona Cardinals ===
Scott was traded to the Arizona Cardinals in exchange for 2010 sixth-round draft pick Jorrick Calvin on August 30, 2010. He was waived on September 3, but re-signed to the team's practice squad on September 4.

=== New York Giants ===
Scott was signed by the New York Giants from the Cardinals' practice squad on September 6, 2010. He was placed on the Giants' practice squad.
