= 2008 Chick-fil-A Bowl =

American college football game

- 41st Peach Bowl
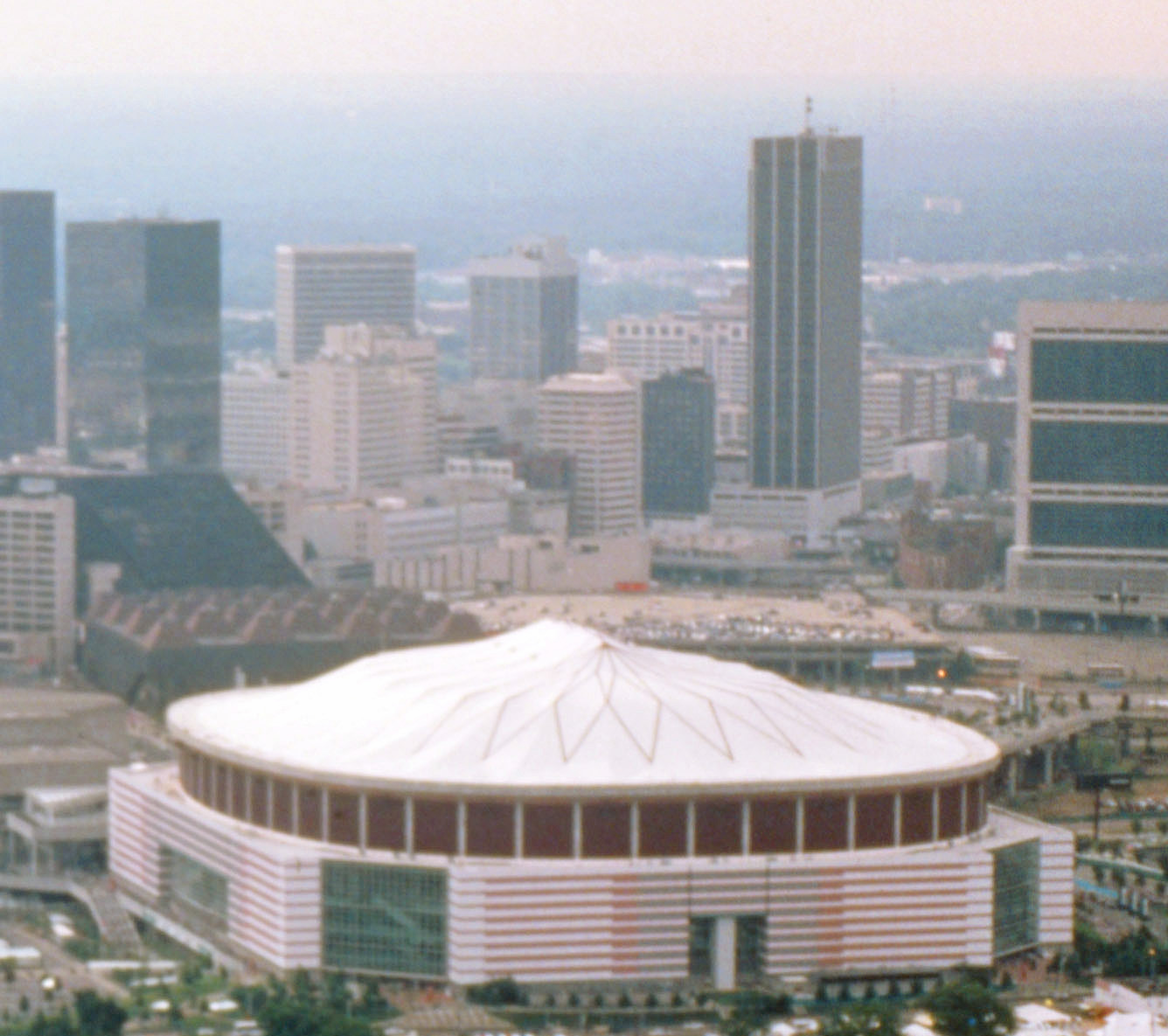
- The Georgia Dome in Atlanta, Georgia, hosted the Chick-fil-A Bowl.
| LSU Tigers | Georgia Tech Yellow Jackets |
| (7–5) | (9–3) |
| SEC | ACC |
| 38 | 3 |
| Head coach: Les Miles | Head coach: Paul Johnson |
| | AP / Coaches / BCS; 14 / 15 / 14 |
| | 1 | 2 | 3 | 4 | Total |
|---|---|---|---|---|---|
| LSU | 7 | 28 | 3 | 0 | 38 |
| Georgia Tech | 3 | 0 | 0 | 0 | 3 |
- Date: December 31, 2008
- Season: 2008
- Stadium: Georgia Dome
- Location: Atlanta, Georgia
- MVP: QB Jordan Jefferson, LSU (Offensive); LB Perry Riley, LSU (Defensive)
- Favorite: Georgia Tech by 3.5
- Referee: Jerry McGinn (Big East)
- Halftime show: Spirit of South Paulding Marching Band
- Attendance: 71,423
- Payout: US$3 million per team

United States TV coverage
- Network: ESPN
- Announcers: Brad Nessler, Bob Griese, Paul Maguire
- Nielsen ratings: 3.4

The 2008 Chick-fil-A Bowl was a college football bowl game between the Louisiana State Tigers and the Georgia Tech Yellow Jackets played in Atlanta, Georgia on December 31, 2008. With sponsorship from Chick-fil-A, it was the 41st edition of the game known throughout most of its history as the Peach Bowl. LSU was from the Southeastern Conference (SEC), and their opponent represented the Atlantic Coast Conference (ACC). It was the final game of the 2008 football season for each team. The game payout was a combined $6.01 million, the sixth-largest among all college football bowl games and the third-largest non-BCS bowl game payout.

== Selection process ==
In choosing the SEC team, the Chick-fil-A Bowl selection committee has the right to select the first SEC school after the Bowl Championship Series, Cotton Bowl Classic, Capital One Bowl, and Outback Bowl make their selections. The selection committee cannot select an SEC team with two fewer losses than the highest available team. The bowl earned the right to select these teams via its multimillion-dollar payout system, which guarantees a certain amount of money to the participating conferences. Prior to 2006, the Chick-fil-A Bowl (then known as the Peach Bowl) matched the No. 5 team in the SEC versus the No. 3 team in the ACC. After the bowl increased its payout to $2.8 million per squad, it then was given the second pick from the ACC, with the Gator Bowl dropping to third.

Beginning with the 2006 game, the Chick-fil-A Bowl had purchased the right to select the highest-ranked Atlantic Coast Conference team after representatives from the Bowl Championship Series made their selection. According to the official selection rules still used today, the team chosen to represent the ACC must be within one conference victory of the remaining highest-ranked conference team or be ranked more than five spaces ahead of the ACC team with the best Conference record available in the final BCS Standings.

== Pre-game buildup ==
On Sunday, December 7, 2008, the SEC representative for the bowl, LSU, was announced. The Chick-fil-A Bowl representatives selected Georgia Tech on December 3, to represent the ACC in the 2008 Chick-fil-A Bowl. Georgia Tech sold out its allotment of 17,500 tickets in less than four business days leaving the Chick-fil-a bowl with only 1,000 tickets remaining. The Chick-fil-A bowl sold all available tickets to the game, making it the 12th consecutive sellout in the combined history of the Peach and Chick-fil-A Bowls.

== Television coverage ==
ESPN broadcast the game for the 13th straight year.

== Scoring summary ==
| Scoring Play | Score |
|---|---|
1st Quarter
| LSU - Charles Scott 2-yard TD run (Colt David kick), 11:58 | LSU 7-0 |
| GT - Scott Blair 24-yard FG, 1:03 | LSU 7-3 |
2nd Quarter
| LSU - Scott 4-yard TD run (David kick), 12:08 | LSU 14-3 |
| LSU - Scott 1-yard TD run (David kick), 8:27 | LSU 21-3 |
| LSU - Richard Dickson 25-yard TD pass from Jordan Jefferson (David kick), 5:21 | LSU 28-3 |
| LSU - Keiland Williams 17-yard TD run (David kick), 1:27 | LSU 35-3 |
3rd Quarter
| LSU - David 53-yard FG, 1:56 | LSU 38-3 |
