= DeAngelo Peterson =

American football player (born 1989)

No. 19
- Position: Tight end

Personal information
- Born: January 11, 1989 (age 37); New Orleans, Louisiana, U.S.
- Listed height: 6 ft 3 in (1.91 m)
- Listed weight: 243 lb (110 kg)

Career information
- High school: Desire Street Academy (Baton Rouge, Louisiana)
- College: LSU
- NFL draft: 2012: undrafted

Career history
- St. Louis Rams (2012)*; Washington Redskins (2012–2013)*; Denver Broncos (2013)*
- * Offseason or practice squad member only
- Stats at Pro Football Reference

DeAngelo Rico-Thomas Peterson (born January 11, 1989) is an American former football tight end. He played college football at Louisiana State University. He signed with St. Louis Rams as an undrafted free agent in 2012.

== College career ==
Peterson played college football at LSU. In his freshman year, he played in 13 games and recorded 6 tackles mainly on special teams.

In his sophomore year, he had 5 receptions, 82 receiving yards, 2 receiving touchdowns. On November 7, 2009, he recorded 2 receptions for 40 yards and a touchdown against No.3 ranked Alabama but LSU lost 24-15. On November 28, 2009, he had a 15-yard receiving touchdown against Arkansas as LSU won in Overtime 33-30.

In his junior year, he had 16 receptions and 198 receiving yards. On October 2, 2010, he recorded 5 receptions for 45 yards against Tennessee helping No.12 ranked LSU wins 16-14. On October 9, 2010, he recorded 2 receptions for 38 yards against No.14 ranked Florida as LSU wins 33-29.

In his senior year, he played in 14 games (5 starts) and had 18 receptions, 179 receiving yards and receiving touchdown. On September 3, 2011, he recorded 4 receptions for 62 yards against No. 3 ranked Oregon helping LSU win 40-27. On September 10, 2011, he had a nine-yard reception against Northwestern State as LSU wins 49-3. On January 9, 2012, in the BCS Championship Game, he recorded one reception for 7 yards.

=== Statistics ===
		Receiving						Rushing				
Season	Team	GP	Rec	Yds	Avg	LNG	TD	Att	Yds	Avg	LNG	TD
2008	LSU Tigers	13	0	0	0	0	0	--	--	--	--	--
2009	LSU Tigers	13	5	82	16.4	28	2	--	--	--	--	--
2010	LSU Tigers	13	16	198	12.4	40	0	1	23	23.0	23	0
2011	LSU Tigers	14	18	179	9.9	29	1	1	-8	-8.0	0	0

== Professional career ==
Pre-draft measurables
Height	Weight	Arm length	Hand span	40-yard dash	Three-cone drill	Vertical jump	Broad jump	Bench press
6 ft 3 in (1.91 m)	238 lb (108 kg)	32 1/2	9 1/2	4.76 s	7.19 s	36.0 in (0.91 m)	10 ft 1 in (3.07 m)	18 reps
All values from NFL Combine

=== St. Louis Rams ===
On April 30, 2012, Peterson signed as an undrafted free agent with the St. Louis Rams following the 2012 NFL draft. On August 31, 2012, he was released during final roster cuts.

=== Washington Redskins ===
On September 3, 2012, he signed with the Washington Redskins to join the practice squad.

Peterson was signed to reserve contract on January 8, 2013. On June 12, the Redskins waived-injured him due to a broken foot. The next day he cleared waivers and was placed on the team's injured reserve. On July 25, 2013, Peterson was waived by the Washington Redskins.

=== Denver Broncos ===
On August 6, 2013, Peterson was signed by the Denver Broncos. On August 25, 2013, he was waived by the Broncos.
