= Franklinton High School (Louisiana) =

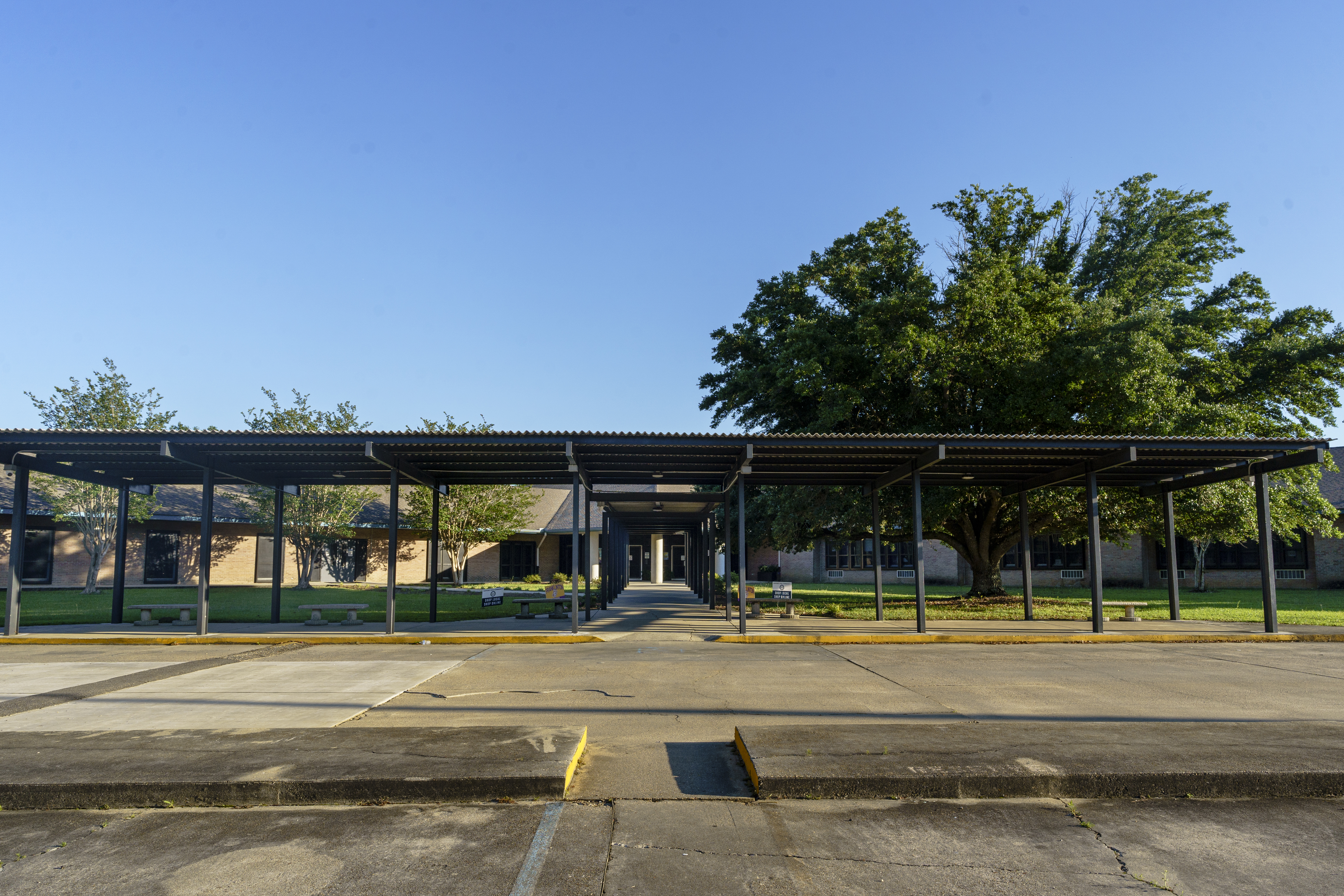
- 1 Demon Circle; Franklinton, Louisiana 70438; United States

Information
- NCES School ID: 220186001424
- Principal: Carson Pierce
- Teaching staff: 52.55 (FTE)
- Enrollment: 704 (2023–2024)
- Student to teacher ratio: 13.40
- Colors: Purple and gold
- Mascot: Demon
- Nickname: Demons
- Yearbook: Demon's Den
- Website: sites.google.com/wpsb.info/fhs/home
- Franklinton High School
- U.S. National Register of Historic Places
- U.S. National Historic Landmark
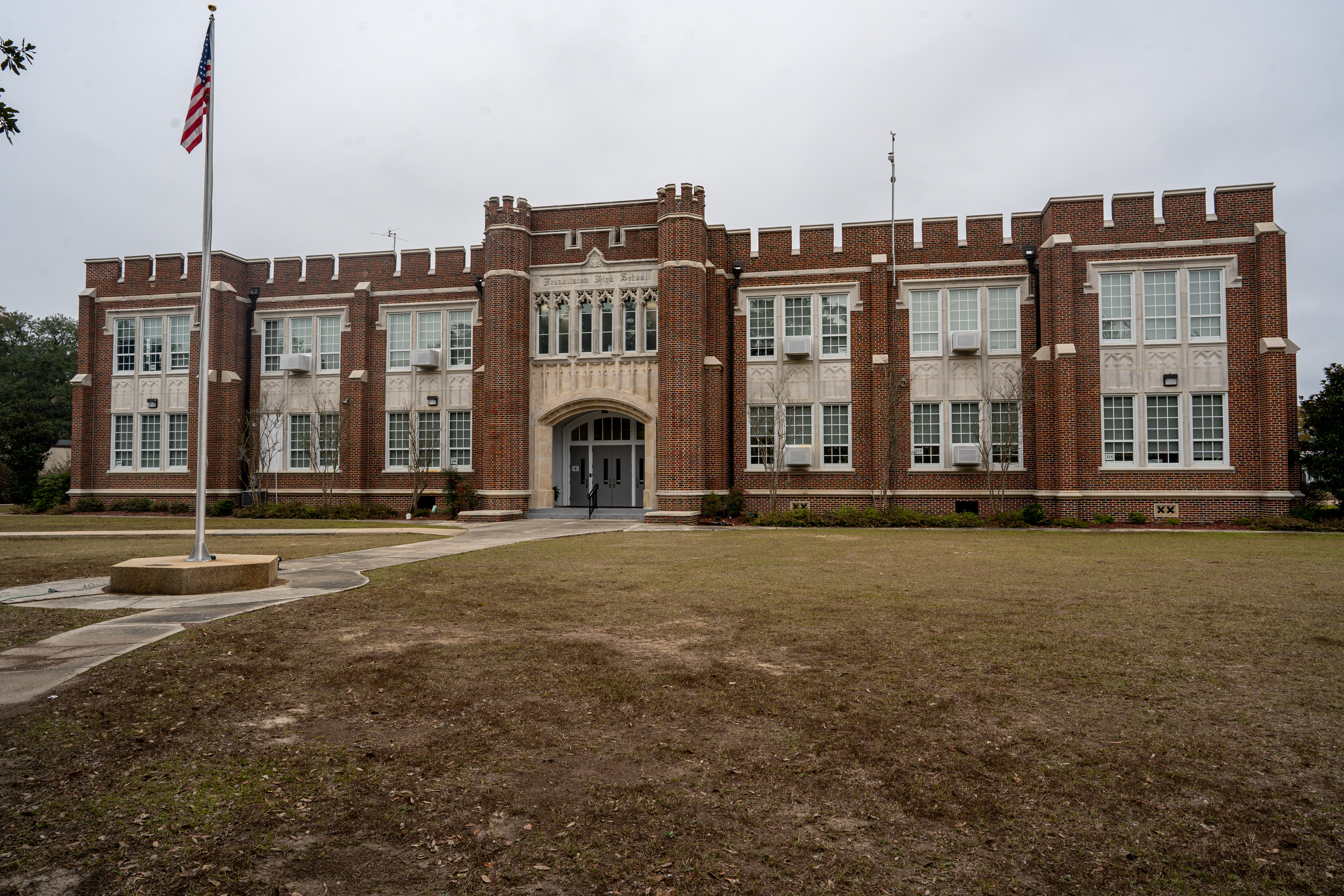
- Old High School building, currently Franklinton Junior High

- Location within Louisiana Location within the United States
- Location: Franklinton, Louisiana
- Coordinates: 30°50′58.07″N 90°9′29.12″W
- Built: 1939, the former high school on Main Street is now the junior high
- Architect: Herman J. Duncan & Co.; Caldwell Bros. & Hart
- Architectural style: Late Gothic Revival
- NRHP reference No.: 98000988
- Added to NRHP: August 6, 1998

Franklinton High School is a public high school in Franklinton, Louisiana, United States. The principal is Shane Smith. The school colors are purple and gold, and the sports teams are known as the Demons. Franklinton High is a part of the Washington Parish School System.

The school's former building, currently the junior high, was listed on the National Register of Historic Places in 1998.

== Arts ==
Franklinton High School has a band program. The program offers the following ensembles: the "Demon Regiment" marching band, the "Screamin Demon" jazz band, the "Purple Haze" basketball pep band and the Franklinton High School Symphonic Band. The band participates in the Louisiana Music Educators Association Large Ensemble Assessment every spring. Individual students are given the opportunity to audition for various Honor Ensembles throughout the year including: the Tangipahoa Association of Music Educators Parish Honor Band, the Louisiana Music Educators Association District IX Honor Band, the Southeastern Louisiana University Honor Winds Ensembles and the Louisiana Music Educators Association All State Honor Ensembles to name a few.

Franklinton High School is one of the few schools in Louisiana to have a show choir. The show choir is called the "Demonaires." It is an ensemble of about 30 students. It has a history of performing for the local area schools and events, like the Washington Parish Free Fair. In 2009, however, the Demonaires participated in their first ever show choir competition, the Mississippi Showchoir Competition, hosted by Pearl River Community College in Hattiesburg, MS. In addition to the show choir involvement, members of the choral department participate in the LMEA district and all-state honor choirs.

Other arts programs: Talented Art (IEP), Fine Arts, and Music Appreciation classes.

== Clubs ==
Franklinton High School has several clubs and organizations, including: BETA Club, National Honor Society, Louisiana Youth For Excellence (formerly the Governor's Program on Abstinence), Student Council, Family Community and Career Leaders of America, Future Farmers of America, TLC (Teens Living for Christ), Fellowship of Christian Athletes, 4-H, Interact, and the American Sign Language Club.

== Athletics ==
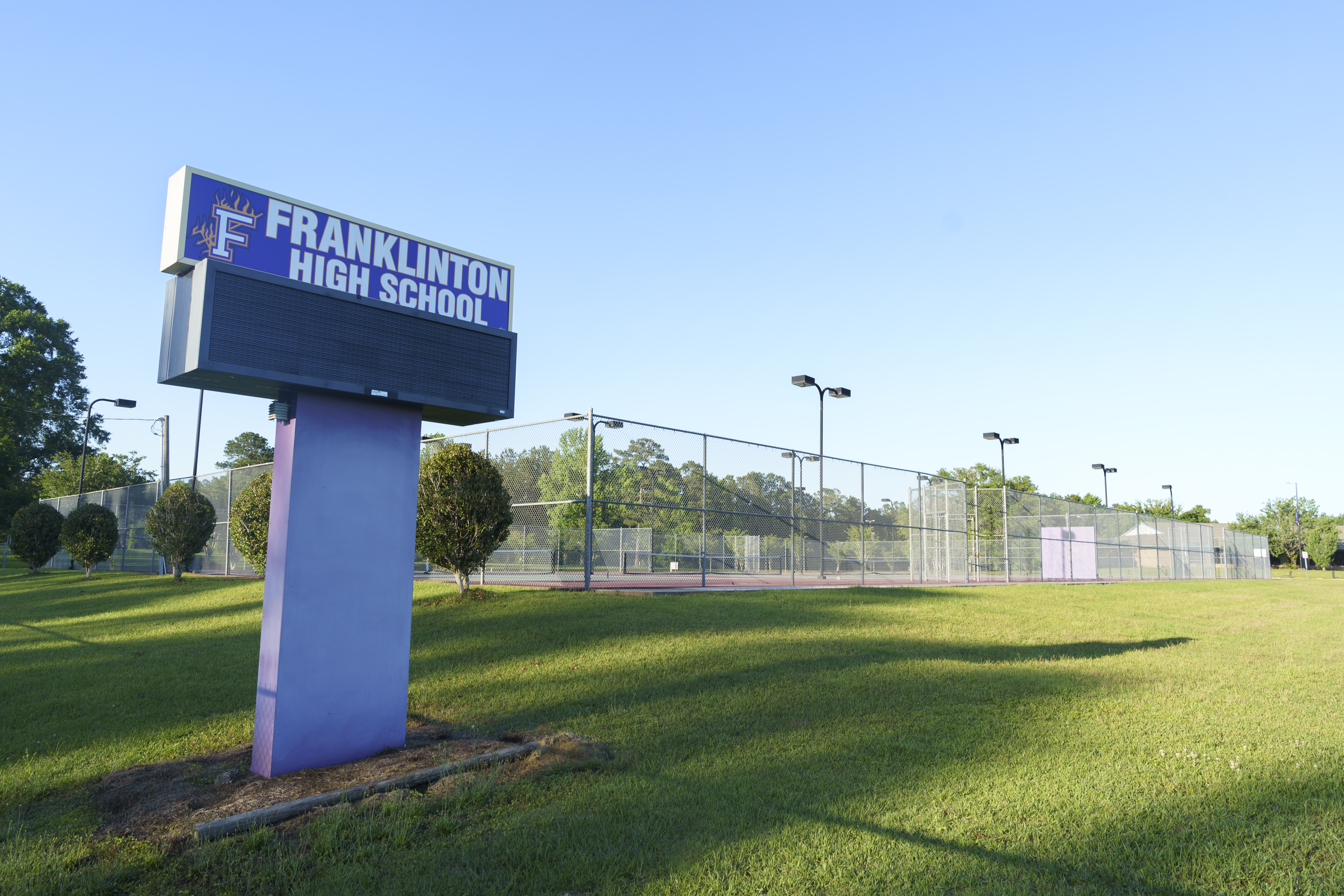

Franklinton High athletics competes in the LHSAA.

=== Championships ===
Football championships

- (2) State LHSAA 2nd place football team
- (1) State Championship: 2010

Football championship history
The FHS football team won the 2010 4A state championship, beating Edna Karr High School in overtime.

== Marine Corps Junior ROTC ==
In 1996 Franklinton adopted a Marine Corps Junior ROTC unit.

== Notable alumni ==
- John L. Crain (born 1960), former president of Southeastern Louisiana University
- Katherine Haik (born 2000), Miss Teen USA 2015
- Josh Robinson (born 1992), former NFL player
- Brandon Taylor (born 1990), former NFL player
- Curtis Taylor (born 1985), former NFL player
