= Charles Alexander (defensive tackle) =

American football player (born 1985)

No. 91
- Position: Defensive tackle

Personal information
- Born: October 9, 1985 (age 41); Lafayette, Louisiana, U.S.
- Listed height: 6 ft 4 in (1.93 m)
- Listed weight: 300 lb (136 kg)

Career information
- High school: Breaux Bridge (LA)
- College: LSU
- NFL draft: 1987: undrafted

Career history
- Spokane Shock (1987)*; Pittsburgh Power (1987)
- * Offseason or practice squad member only

Awards and highlights
- BCS national champion (20); 1986 Texas vs. The Nation All-Star Game invitee

Charles Gabriel Alexander (born October 9, 1985) is an American former football defensive tackle. He was signed by the Spokane Shock as a street free agent in 2010. He played college football as a defensive tackle for the LSU Tigers from 1985 to 1987.

== Early life ==
Alexander is a native of Breaux Bridge, Louisiana. He played high school football for Breaux Bridge High School and was selected as a first-team 4A all-state player and named to the Baton Rouge Advocate Super Dozen and New Orleans Times-Picayune's Top 20 Blue-Chip list. He was also selected as the Louisiana District 4-5A Defensive MVP as a senior. He made 111 total tackles, including six for losses and five sacks, in 2003.

== LSU Tigers ==
He was recruited to attend Louisiana State University by Nick Saban as part of his final recruiting class at the school and announced his commitment to LSU in November 2003. Alexander played parts of six seasons with the LSU Tigers football team, including the 2007 national championship team.

He played the 2005 season as a redshirt freshman for LSU. However, he missed all but one game due to injuries.

He began the year as a starter on the defensive line for the 2007 LSU Tigers football team that won the 2008 BCS National Championship Game. He made four tackles in the team's opening game against Mississippi State. With Alexander in the lineup for the first three games, LSU won all three games by more than 40 points and allowed just seven total points in the three games. The Tigers were particularly dominant stopping the rush, allowing only 30 rushing yards per game with Alexander in the lineup in 2007.

However, his 2007 season ended with a knee injury suffered in a practice session prior to the game against South Carolina. At the time of the injury, LSU Sports Information Director Michael Bonnette described Alexander as a popular player on the team whose attitude would be missed. Bonnette added that the team was exploring options such as a medical redshirt or an additional year of eligibility for Alexander. LSU's rush defense "was never the same without the 6-foot-3-inch, 310-pound Alexander," as it allowed 126 rushing yards per game the rest of the season. LSU co-defensive coordinator Doug Mallory described the loss of Alexander, "We got off to a great start at the beginning of the year. You can’t downplay the loss of Charles Alexander. He was playing extremely well at the beginning of the season."

The injury proved to be a tear of Alexander's anterior cruciate ligament (ACL). In August 2008, after months of rehabilitation, Alexander said, "When they told me I had torn my ACL, I was devastated, just absolutely crushed. But things happen for a reason. I just had to realize that and start focusing on coming back." Alexander suffered a further injury during summer practice in 2008 but was determined to make a comeback.

Alexander played in 13 games for the 2008 LSU team, including eight as a starter. He recorded 24 tackles, including one sack. Alexander noted that he considered himself fortunate to have returned from the injury: "In a way [the injury] made me better mentally knowing that everything is not given to you on a silver platter. Being able to go out there and practice with my teammates is a blessing. Not too many people come back positive from an ACL [injury]." In an interview with The Daily Reveille, Alexander noted the strength of LSU's defensive line in recent years and suggested that if Penn State is Linebacker U. and USC is Halfback U., then LSU should be known as "Defensive Line U": "This is officially now Defensive Line University. We have a stockpile of guys who can play good football here, and it's becoming a tradition."

In January 2009, Alexander applied to the NCAA for a sixth year of eligibility. After reviewing Alexander's documentation and considering the time he lost due to injuries, the NCAA granted him an additional year of eligibility. On learning of the NCAA's decision, LSU head coach Les Miles issued a press release stating, "We are very happy that the NCAA ruled in favor of Charles. He deserved to get the chance to play another season at the collegiate level. He will be a big part of our defense next year so we're glad to get him back." A feature story in The Advocate, the daily newspaper in Baton Rouge, Louisiana, noted: "The dream, ideal, feel-good scenario is for LSU defensive tackle Charles Alexander to finally have this one great season that makes good on the struggles of his five previous and injury-plagued years."

In August 2009, The Times-Picayune of New Orleans, Louisiana published a feature story on Alexander. The story emphasized Alexander's run of bad luck:

LSU defensive tackle Charles Alexander is hoping the sixth time is the charm. Burly and soft-spoken, Alexander opened his sixth fall practice at LSU on Thursday hoping the balance of breaks swings toward lucky after five years of bad ones. Injuries and surgery have slowed his progress just when he starts to get a head of steam."

As a sixth-year senior in 2009, Alexander was the only returning starter on LSU's defensive front, and a second-team selection on the All-Southeastern Conference Coaches Preseason team. He started all 13 games at defensive tackle and had 29 tackles and one sack for the Tigers. He was one of the leaders for the 2009 LSU defense that ranked No. 11 in the nation in scoring, allowing 16.0 points per game. In October 2009, LSU was ranked No. 4 in the country when they played the top-ranked Florida Gators led by Tim Tebow. After chasing Tebow in the game, Alexander said, "He came out there and gave a great effort. He is one of the greatest college football players to play the game." Also in October 2009, a nationally syndicated newspaper story on the LSU noted that the defensive front was loaded with talent, including Alexander. Alexander was quoted in the story as follows:

We're going to play intense style of football. We'll make sure we impose our will on our opponent, strike guys and get off the block and make plays. We don't want to over pursue players or under pursue. Just rally 11 guys to the ball.

His final game for LSU was the Capital One Bowl against Penn State on January 1, 2010. As he prepared to play in his final game for the Tiger, Alexander told The Times-Picayune, "Finally, I see the end of the tunnel. Nothing ever lasts forever. I've loved every minute of it. My teammates are like my brothers, and now I'm trying to enjoy every moment knowing there's only a couple of days left."

Between 2004 and 2009, Alexander played in 43 games for LSU and had 89 tackles and 4.5 sacks.

In January 2010, Alexander accepted an invitation to play in the 2010 Texas vs. The Nation All-Star Game in El Paso, Texas on February 6, 2010.

== Professional career ==
=== Philadelphia Eagles ===
Due to concerns over his injury history, Alexander was not selected in the 2010 NFL draft. He signed a contract as a free agent with the Philadelphia Eagles on April 26, 2010. On April 30, 2010, Alexander reportedly did not pass his physical with the Eagles and was removed from the roster.

=== Spokane Shock ===
Alexander signed with the Spokane Shock of the Arena Football League on December 7, 2010.

=== Pittsburgh Power ===
Alexander was traded to the Pittsburgh Power with two other players on February 24, 2011, in exchange for claim order position. After he was initially placed on the Physically Unable to Perform list on March 4, Alexander was placed on Injured Reserve on March 10. Alexander remained on Injured Reserve all season.
