= Quinn Johnson =

American football player (born 1986)

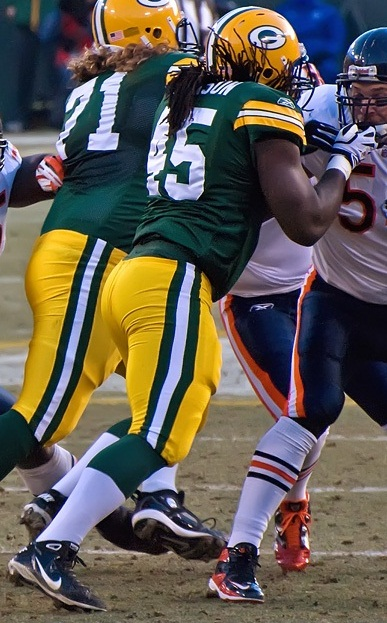
- Johnson with the Green Bay Packers in 2011

No. 45, 44
- Position: Fullback

Personal information
- Born: September 30, 1986 (age 40); New Orleans, Louisiana, U.S.
- Listed height: 6 ft 1 in (1.85 m)
- Listed weight: 263 lb (119 kg)

Career information
- High school: West St. John (Edgard, Louisiana)
- College: LSU
- NFL draft: 2009: 5th round, 145th overall pick

Career history
- Green Bay Packers (2009–2010); Tennessee Titans (2011); Denver Broncos (2011); Tennessee Titans (2011–2013)

Awards and highlights
- Super Bowl champion (XLV); BCS national champion (2008)

Career NFL statistics
- Receptions: 13
- Receiving yards: 100
- Stats at Pro Football Reference

Quinn Marcus Johnson (born September 30, 1986) is an American former professional football player who was a fullback in the National Football League (NFL). He played college football for the LSU Tigers and was selected by the Green Bay Packers in the fifth round of the 2009 NFL draft. Johnson was a part of the Packers' Super Bowl XLV championship team. He also played for the Tennessee Titans and Denver Broncos.

== Early life ==
Johnson attended West Saint John High School in Edgard, Louisiana, where he was a member of the Rams 2003 2A State Championship team.

== Professional career ==
=== Green Bay Packers ===
Johnson was selected in the fifth round (145th overall) of the 2009 NFL draft by the Packers.

With Johnson on the roster, the 2010 Packers went on to win Super Bowl XLV. Johnson appeared in the first three games of the playoffs, but was listed inactive for the Super Bowl. Johnson had a first-down reception in the Packers' 21–16 Wild Card Round victory over the Philadelphia Eagles.

=== Tennessee Titans ===
On September 3, 2011, Johnson was traded to the Tennessee Titans. He was released on October 7, 2011, to make room on the roster for fullback Ahmard Hall who was returning to the team from a four-game suspension.

=== Denver Broncos ===
On October 10, 2011, the Denver Broncos received Johnson off of waivers from the Tennessee Titans. Johnson was then waived by the Broncos and the Tennessee Titans claimed him off of waivers. On December 3, 2013, Johnson re-signed with the Titans.

Despite appearing as a back in five NFL seasons, 44 games, recording rushing attempts and 13 receptions, Johnson never scored a touchdown in his NFL career.

== Personal life ==
Johnson is cousins with Dillon Gordon who was an offensive guard for the Philadelphia Eagles and the Carolina Panthers, last appearing in 2019.
