= Richard Murphy (American football) =

American football player (born 1986)

No. 39
- Position: Running back

Personal information
- Born: September 18, 1986 (age 40); Monroe, Louisiana, U.S.
- Listed height: 6 ft 1 in (1.85 m)
- Listed weight: 208 lb (94 kg)

Career information
- High school: Rayville (LA)
- College: Louisiana State (2006–2010)
- NFL draft: 2011: undrafted

Career history
- Jacksonville Jaguars (2011–2012)

Career NFL statistics
- Rushing yards: 92
- Rushing average: 4
- Return yards: 118
- Stats at Pro Football Reference

Richard Lee Murphy (born September 18, 1986) is an American former professional football player who was a running back in the National Football League (NFL). He was signed by the Jacksonville Jaguars as an undrafted free agent in 2011. He played college football for the LSU Tigers.

== College career ==
In LSU's second game of the 2009 season against Vanderbilt, Murphy suffered a season-ending torn ACL. As a senior at LSU, Murphy was chosen by the coaching staff to wear the No. 18 jersey, which signifies the player who displays the best leadership qualities. Only a "part-time player" over his career at LSU, Murphy was seen as a development prospect, and went undrafted in the 2011 NFL draft.

== Professional career ==
Pre-draft measurables
| Height | Weight | 40-yard dash | 10-yard split | 20-yard split | 20-yard shuttle | Three-cone drill | Vertical jump | Broad jump | Bench press |
|---|---|---|---|---|---|---|---|---|---|
| 6 ft 0 7/8 in (1.85 m) | 208 lb (94 kg) | 4.57 s | 1.57 s | 2.65 s | 4.39 s | 7.10 s | 34.0 in (0.86 m) | 9 ft 8 in (2.95 m) | 21 reps |
All values from Pro Day

Murphy was signed by the Jacksonville Jaguars as an undrafted free agent on July 28 2011, having gone unselected in the 2011 NFL draft. He was placed on the injured reserve list on September 3, and did not appear for Jacksonville during the regular season.

Murphy was released by the Jaguars on August 31, 2012, as a part of the team's final roster cuts. He was re-signed to the team's practice squad on October 31.

Murphy was released by the Jaguars on May 6, 2013.

== Personal life ==
At 10 years old, Murphy's father Robinson died of lung cancer; during his senior year of high school, his mother Anna died of cancer.

On June 14, 2026, Murphy was involved in a car crash in Baton Rouge, Louisiana, which resulted in the deaths of Robert Tarver, 95, and Carla Tarver, 70; another victim was taken to the hospital with serious injuries. He was later arrested and charged with vehicular homicide and DUI, with video showing Murphy running a red light and traveling double the posted speed limit before striking the vehicle containing the victims.
