= Greg Studrawa =

American football player and coach (born 1964)

Current position
- Title: Head Coach
- Team: IMG Academy

Biographical details
- Born: November 3, 1964 (age 61); Fostoria, Ohio, U.S.

Playing career
- 1984–1987: Bowling Green
- Position: Offensive tackle

Coaching career (HC unless noted)
- 1989–1990: Cincinnati (GA)
- 1991–1996: Wilmington (OC)
- 1997: Ohio State (GA)
- 1998–2000: Arkansas State (OL)
- 2001–2002: Bowling Green (OL)
- 2003–2005: Bowling Green (OC/OL)
- 2006: Bowling Green (AHC/OC)
- 2007–2010: LSU (OL)
- 2011–2012: LSU (OC/OL)
- 2013: LSU (OL)
- 2014–2015: Maryland (OL)
- 2016–2021: Ohio State (OL)
- 2023–2024: Cologne Centurions (OC/OL)
- 2025-present: IMG Academy

Greg Studrawa (born November 3, 1964) is an American football coach and former player. He has been an offensive line coach of many schools, including Arkansas State, Bowling Green, LSU, Maryland, and Ohio State. He has also been an offensive coordinator at Wilmington, Bowling Green, and LSU.

== Playing career ==
Studrawa went to high school at St. Wendelin High School in Ohio and played college football at Bowling Green from 1984 to 1987, where he was a two-year starter and a Mid-American Conference Champion in 1985 under Denny Stolz and Moe Ankney.

== Coaching career ==
Studrawa started his coaching career at Cincinnati as a graduate assistant under former Harvard head coach Tim Murphy from 1989 to 1990. He got his first offensive coordinator job at Division-III Wilmington, holding that role from 1991 to 1996.

He joined Ohio State in 1997 as a graduate assistant under John Cooper. After that, he was hired as the offensive line coach of Arkansas State.

He joined his alma mater in 2001 and served there from 2001 to 2007. He was the offensive line coach from 2001 to 2002, then the offensive coordinator from 2003 to 2007. His offense was 1st overall in the country in team offense in 2003 (his first year) and 47th in the country in 2007 (his last year).

He was hired by LSU in 2007 to be their offensive line coach, the year that LSU won their third national championship. He stayed in that role until 2011 when he was promoted to offensive coordinator by Les Miles. He got demoted back to offensive line coach in 2013. He was not retained after the 2013 season.

In 2014, Studrawa was hired by Maryland to be their offensive line coach, the fourth such school he was an offensive line coach at. He stayed at Maryland until the 2016 season, where he was hired by Ohio State to serve in the same role. In 2019, under new head coach Ryan Day, he was retained. He was let go after the 2021 season.
