= Kirston Pittman =

American football player

No. 9
- Position: Defensive end

Personal information
- Born: Reserve, Louisiana, U.S.
- Listed height: 6 ft 3 in (1.91 m)
- Listed weight: 250 lb (113 kg)

Career information
- High school: East St. John (Reserve, Louisiana)
- College: Louisiana State
- NFL draft: 2009: undrafted

Career history
- St. Louis Rams (2009)*; Chicago Rush (2011); New Orleans VooDoo (2011)
- * Offseason or practice squad member only

Awards and highlights
- BCS national champion (2003); Sporting News Freshman All-SEC (2003)

Career AFL statistics
- Tackles: 9
- Sacks: 1
- Forced fumbles: 1
- Stats at ArenaFan.com

Kirston Jarre Pittman is an American former football defensive end. He was signed by the St. Louis Rams as an undrafted free agent in 2009. He played college football at Louisiana State.

== Early life ==
As a senior at East St. John High School, Reserve, Louisiana, Pittman made 42 tackles, blocked three punts, and had one interception returned for a touchdown. As a junior, he registered 40 tackles and 12 sacks.

== College career ==
In 2003, Pittman earned Freshmen All-SEC honors from the Sporting News and was named honorable mention Freshmen All-American by College Football News. He Played in 13 games with no starts and recorded 15 tackles and 2 sacks.

In 2004, he played 12 games with one start. He has 21 tackles (11 solo) with 5 going for a loss and three sacks. He also broke up a pass.

Pittman missed all of 2006 after tearing Achilles tendon during an offseason workout and there year before, 2005, redshirted after missing the entire season with a foot injury.

Pittman was granted a sixth year of eligibility by the NCAA due to injuries. He ended 2008 with 35 tackles (5.5 for a loss) and 2.5 sacks. In 2007, he started all 14 games and had 68 total tackles (29 solo) with 12.5 going for losses and 7.5 sacks. He also intercepted a pass and broke up one pass.

== Professional career ==
=== Pre-draft ===
Pre-draft measurables
Height	Weight	40-yard dash	10-yard split	20-yard split	20-yard shuttle	Three-cone drill	Vertical jump	Broad jump	Bench press
6 ft 2 5/8 in (1.90 m)	250 lb (113 kg)	4.69 s	1.61 s	2.72 s	4.45 s	7.64 s	30 1/2 in (0.77 m)	8 ft 8 in (2.64 m)	28 reps
All values from Pro Day.

=== St. Louis Rams ===
After going undrafted in the 2009 NFL draft, Pittman signed a two-year contract with the St. Louis Rams as an undrafted free agent. He was waived/injured on July 29 and subsequently reverted to the team's injured reserve list. He was released on August 4.

=== Chicago Rush ===
Pittman was assigned to the Chicago Rush of the Arena Football League during the 2011 season. He appeared in 3 games with the Rush, recording 3 tackles.

=== New Orleans VooDoo ===
On May 22, 2011, Pittman was traded to the New Orleans VooDoo for future considerations.
