= Brandon Taylor (American football) =

American football player (born 1990)

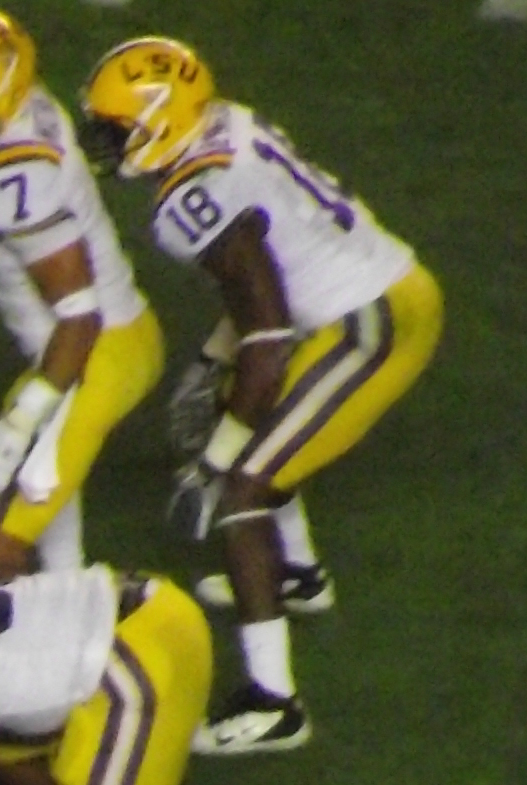
- Taylor at LSU in 2011

No. 28
- Position: Safety

Personal information
- Born: January 29, 1990 (age 36); Bogalusa, Louisiana, U.S.
- Listed height: 5 ft 11 in (1.80 m)
- Listed weight: 205 lb (93 kg)

Career information
- High school: Franklinton (LA)
- College: LSU (2008–2011)
- NFL draft: 2012: 3rd round, 73rd overall pick

Career history
- San Diego Chargers (2012–2013)

Career NFL statistics
- Total tackles: 6
- Sacks: 0.5
- Stats at Pro Football Reference

Brandon Alex Taylor (born January 29, 1990) is an American former professional football player who was a safety for the San Diego Chargers of the National Football League (NFL). He played college football for the LSU Tigers. The Chargers selected him in the third round of the 2012 NFL draft, in which he was considered one of the top safety prospects.

== College career ==
Taylor attended Louisiana State University from 2008 to 2011. During his career he started 33 of 49 games and recorded 160 tackles, four interceptions and a sack.

== Professional career ==
Pre-draft measurables
Height	Weight	Arm length	Hand span	40-yard dash	10-yard split	20-yard split	20-yard shuttle	Three-cone drill	Vertical jump	Broad jump	Bench press
5 ft 11 1/4 in (1.81 m)	209 lb (95 kg)	31 1/4 in (0.79 m)	9 1/2 in (0.24 m)	4.58 s	1.60 s	2.74 s	4.37 s	6.98 s	33.5 in (0.85 m)	9 ft 10 in (3.00 m)	16 reps
All values from NFL Combine/Pro Day

Taylor was selected in the third round with the 73rd overall pick by the San Diego Chargers in the 2012 NFL draft. On December 26, 2012, he was placed on injured reserve due to a knee injury. On June 19, 2014, Taylor was waived from the Chargers.

== Personal life ==
His older brother is safety Curtis Taylor, who was selected by the San Francisco 49ers in the seventh round of the 2009 NFL draft after also playing for LSU.
