= Chase Clement (tight end) =

American football player (born 1989)

No. 88
- Position: Tight end

Personal information
- Born: August 1, 1989 (age 37); Thibodaux, Louisiana, U.S.
- Listed height: 6 ft 5 in (1.96 m)
- Listed weight: 265 lb (120 kg)

Career information
- High school: E.D. White (Thibodaux, Louisiana)
- College: LSU
- NFL draft: 2013: undrafted

Career history
- New York Giants (2013)*
- * Offseason or practice squad member only

Chase Michael Clement (born August 1, 1989) is an American former football tight end. He was signed by the New York Giants as an undrafted free agent in 2013. He played college football at Louisiana State University (LSU).

== Early life ==
Chase Clement was born in Thibodaux, Louisiana. He is the son of Renee Jennings and Terry, and nephew of former Detroit Lions offensive lineman, Eric Andolsek. Clement attended E. D. White High School, where he played both defensive end and tight end.

During his senior year, he was one of the top rated players in 2007. Clement was named to the Rivals.com 250 with a four-star rating. He was listed as PrepStar All American and played in the inaugural Offense-Defense All-American Bowl.

== College career ==
Clement attended Louisiana State University, where he played 53 games, making 22 starts during his career. He caught 14 passes for 189 yards and 1 touchdown. Clement originally played as a backup defensive end during his redshirt freshman season in 2009. At the arrival of his sophomore year, Clement made a switch to tight end, starting in 8 games, and making two catches for 42 yards.

He majored in general studies with concentrations in communication studies, sociology, and business administration.

== Professional career ==
Clement went undrafted in the 2013 NFL draft and was signed that day by the New York Giants. On August 25, 2013, he was cut by the Giants.

Currently works a 30 hour/ week construction job

== See also ==
- List of New York Giants players
