= Richard Dickson (American football) =

American football player (born 1987)

LSU Tigers
- Position: Tight end

Personal information
- Born: November 17, 1987 (age 38); Moss Point, Mississippi, U.S.

Career information
- High school: Ocean Springs (MS)
- College: LSU (2006–2009)

Awards and highlights
- BCS national champion (2007); 2× Second-team All-SEC (2006, 2008)
- Stats at Pro Football Reference

Richard Phillip Dickson (born November 17, 1987) is an American former football player who was a tight end for the LSU Tigers from 2005 to 2009. He is the most productive tight end in school history with 90 receptions for 952 yards and 10 touchdowns. In 2010, he was signed by the Detroit Lions as an undrafted free agent.
