= Brett Helms =

American football player (born 1986)

No. 61, 67
- Position: Center

Personal information
- Born: April 16, 1986 (age 40); Pine Bluff, Arkansas, U.S.
- Listed height: 6 ft 2 in (1.88 m)
- Listed weight: 303 lb (137 kg)

Career information
- High school: Stuttgart (Stuttgart, Arkansas)
- College: Louisiana State
- NFL draft: 2009: undrafted

Career history
- Houston Texans (2009–2010)*; Virginia Destroyers (2011)
- * Offseason or practice squad member only

Awards and highlights
- UFL champion (2011)

Charles Brett Helms (born April 16, 1986) is an American former football center. He was signed by the Houston Texans as an undrafted free agent in 2009. He played college football at Louisiana State.
