= Perry Riley =

American football player (born 1988)

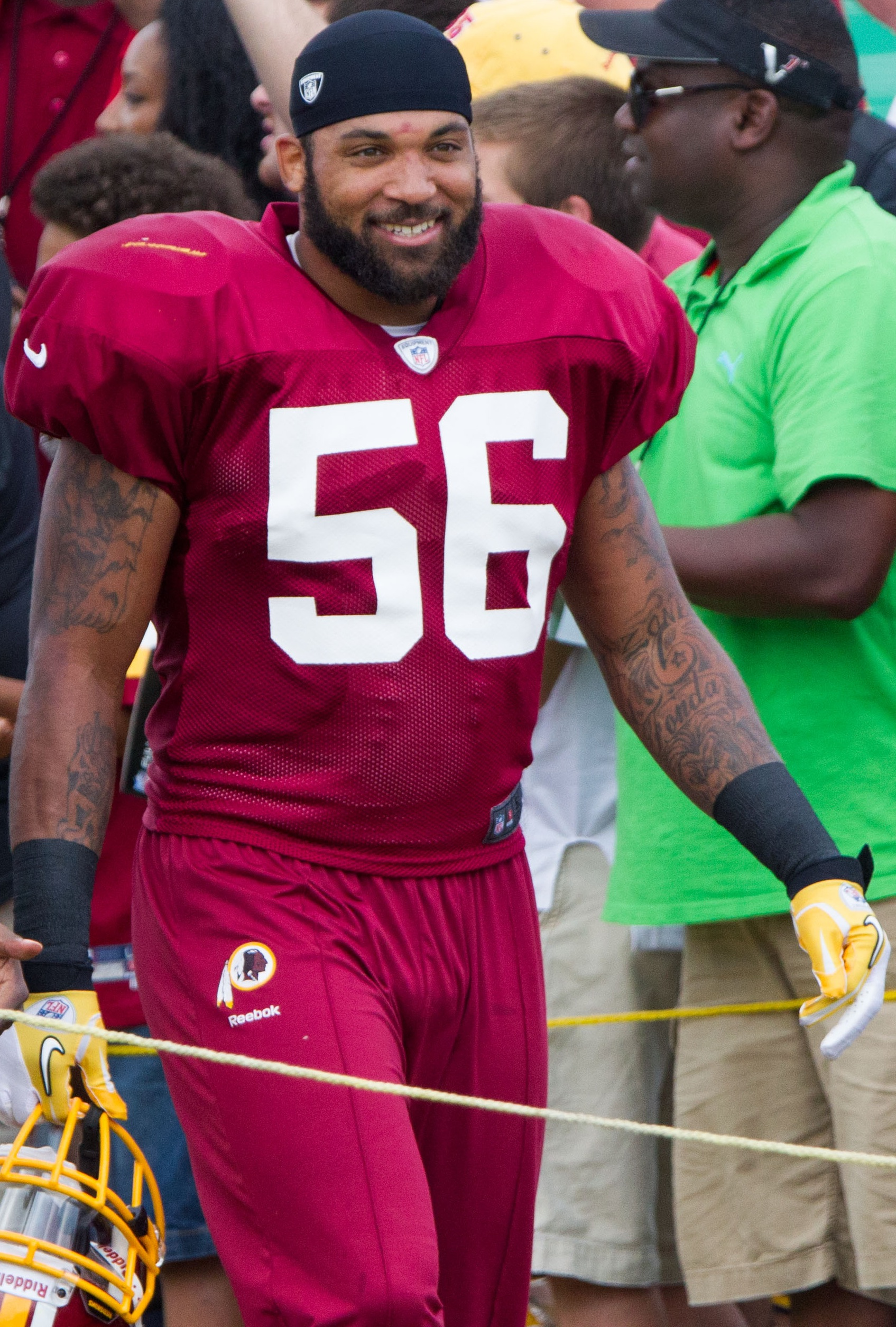
- Riley with the Washington Redskins in 2012

No. 56, 54
- Position: Linebacker

Personal information
- Born: May 3, 1988 (age 38); Atlanta, Georgia, U.S.
- Listed height: 6 ft 1 in (1.85 m)
- Listed weight: 240 lb (109 kg)

Career information
- High school: Stephenson (Stone Mountain, Georgia)
- College: LSU
- NFL draft: 2010: 4th round, 103rd overall pick

Career history
- Washington Redskins (2010–2015); Oakland Raiders (2016)

Awards and highlights
- BCS national champion (2007)

Career NFL statistics
- Total Tackles: 503
- Sacks: 9.5
- Forced fumbles: 4
- Fumble recoveries: 4
- Interceptions: 3
- Stats at Pro Football Reference

Perry Alphonso Riley Jr. (born May 3, 1988) is an American former professional football player who was a linebacker in the National Football League (NFL). He was selected by the Washington Redskins in the fourth round of the 2010 NFL draft. He played college football for the LSU Tigers.

== Early life ==
Riley attended Stephenson High School in Stone Mountain, Georgia, where he, besides occasionally lining up at running back and strong safety, was part of a highly talented linebacker corps with teammates Kelvin Sheppard, Marcus Ball and Jermaine Cunningham. In his junior year, he registered 96 tackles, eight sacks and five forced fumbles. As a senior, Riley recorded 131 tackles, four interceptions, two sacks, five tackles for loss, and one defensive touchdown.

Regarded as a three-star recruit by Rivals.com, Riley was listed as the No. 27 outside linebackers prospect in the nation. He chose LSU over Tennessee, among others.

== College career ==
In his true freshman year at LSU, Riley saw action in seven games and was credited with four tackles. As a sophomore, he played all 14 season games for the Tigers and tallied 24 tackles, including 1.5 for losses and a half quarterback sack. Riley recorded two solo tackles in the 2008 BCS National Championship Game versus Ohio State.

A starter in his junior year for the Tigers, Riley ranked among the team leaders in total tackles with 60, including 7.0 for losses and 1.5 sacks. He was also credited with an interception, three pass breakups, and three quarterback hurries. Riley was named Defensive MVP of the 2008 Chick-fil-A Bowl and a finalist for the 2008 Butkus Award.

== Professional career ==
Pre-draft measurables
Height	Weight	Arm length	Hand span	40-yard dash	10-yard split	20-yard split	20-yard shuttle	Three-cone drill	Vertical jump	Broad jump	Bench press
6 ft 1 in (1.85 m)	239 lb (108 kg)	32 1/2 in (0.83 m)	9 1/2 in (0.24 m)	4.72 s	1.67 s	2.78 s	4.25 s	6.97 s	35.5 in (0.90 m)	9 ft 11 in (3.02 m)	17 reps
All values from NFL Combine / LSU's Pro Day

=== Washington Redskins ===
Riley was selected by the Washington Redskins in the fourth round (103rd overall) of the 2010 NFL draft. He was signed to a contract on June 18, 2010. He was inactive most of the 2010 season. He played very well during times that he was on the field, but also made costly penalties, most notably he committed a 15-yard block in the back penalty against the Minnesota Vikings, nullifying Brandon Banks' punt return touchdown that would have won the game.

In the 2011 season, Riley would have his first career start in Week 10 against the Miami Dolphins. He would continue being the starting right inside linebacker in place of Rocky McIntosh. In Week 16 against the Minnesota Vikings, Riley recorded his first career sack. Riley finished the season playing all 16 games, starting eight of them, and recording 68 combined tackles, one sack, and four pass breakups.

Riley maintained his starting position at the right inside linebacker position by the start of the 2012 season. In Week 2 against the St. Louis Rams, he recorded his first career forced fumble from wide receiver Danny Amendola, which was recovered by Josh Wilson and returned 30 yards for a touchdown.

Riley continued to start at the "Ted" inside linebacker position at the start of the 2013 season. He recorded his first career interception on Kansas City Chiefs backup quarterback Chase Daniel in a Week 14 loss. Long-time defensive captain, London Fletcher, personally supported that the Redskins re-sign Riley after the season when Riley would become a free agent. During Fletcher's retirement announcement, he announced his confidence in Riley's abilities and stated "But as this season has gone, I really wanted to help Perry Riley develop a little bit more. I think he’s at that point where Perry doesn’t need me anymore. He’s that player that I know he can be."

Riley was set to become a free agent in 2014, and it was announced on the day before free agency began that Riley had re-signed with the Redskins to a three-year, $13 million contract.

He was released by the Redskins on August 30, 2016.

=== Oakland Raiders ===
On October 4, 2016, Riley was signed by the Oakland Raiders. Riley started all 11 games he played for the Raiders, compiling 38 tackles and 10 assists.

== NFL career statistics ==
Legend
**Bold**	Career high

=== Regular season ===
Year	Team	Games		Tackles					Interceptions					Fumbles			
Year	Team	GP	GS	Cmb	Solo	Ast	Sck	TFL	Int	Yds	TD	Lng	PD	FF	FR	Yds	TD
2010	WAS	8	0	7	7	0	0.0	0	0	0	0	0	0	0	0	0	0
2011	WAS	**16**	8	68	35	33	1.0	7	0	0	0	0	4	0	**2**	3	0
2012	WAS	**16**	**16**	**129**	**73**	**56**	**3.5**	6	0	0	0	0	7	1	1	0	0
2013	WAS	**16**	**16**	115	72	43	3.0	7	1	0	0	0	**8**	0	1	**6**	0
2014	WAS	14	14	93	60	33	2.0	**8**	0	0	0	0	4	1	0	0	0
2015	WAS	9	9	43	23	20	0.0	1	**2**	**7**	0	**7**	3	0	0	0	0
2016	OAK	11	11	48	38	10	0.0	0	0	0	0	0	1	**2**	0	0	0
		90	74	503	308	195	9.5	29	3	7	0	7	27	4	4	9	0

=== Playoffs ===
Year	Team	Games		Tackles					Interceptions					Fumbles			
Year	Team	GP	GS	Cmb	Solo	Ast	Sck	TFL	Int	Yds	TD	Lng	PD	FF	FR	Yds	TD
2012	WAS	**1**	**1**	**8**	**7**	1	**1.0**	**1**	0	0	0	0	0	0	0	0	0
2016	OAK	**1**	**1**	6	3	**3**	0.0	0	0	0	0	0	0	0	0	0	0
		2	2	14	10	4	1.0	1	0	0	0	0	0	0	0	0	0
