= Herman Johnson (American football) =

American football player (born 1985)

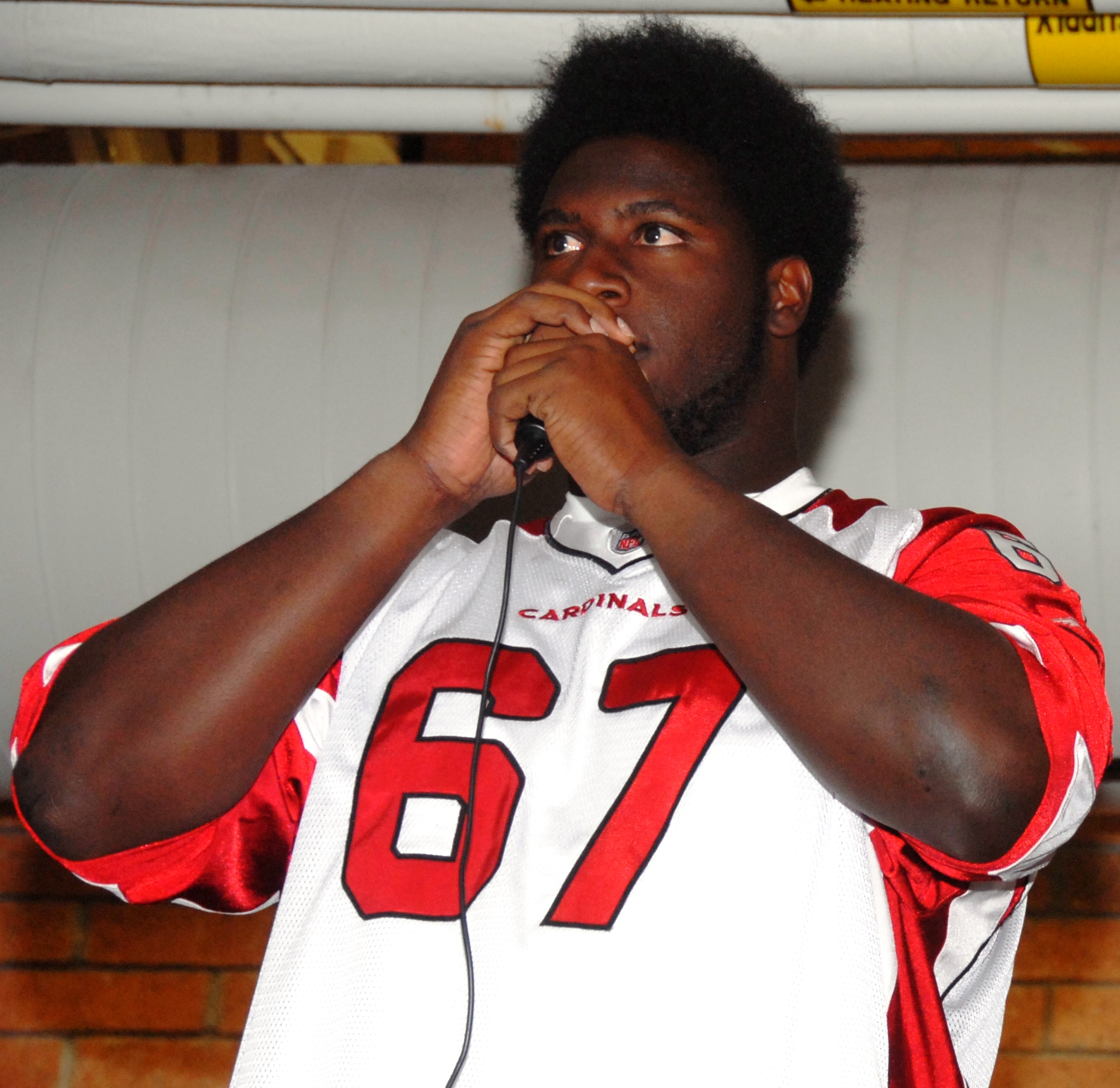
- Johnson in 2009

No. 67
- Position: Guard

Personal information
- Born: January 29, 1985 (age 41); Monroe, Louisiana, U.S.
- Listed height: 6 ft 7 in (2.01 m)
- Listed weight: 382 lb (173 kg)

Career information
- High school: Denton (Denton, Texas)
- College: LSU
- NFL draft: 2009: 5th round, 167th overall pick

Career history
- Arizona Cardinals (2009–2010); Chicago Bears (2010); New York Giants (2011)*
- * Offseason or practice squad member only

Awards and highlights
- BCS national champion (2007); First-team All-American (2008); 3× First-team All-SEC (2006, 2007, 2008)
- Stats at Pro Football Reference

Herman Johnson III (born January 29, 1985) is an American former professional football player who was a guard in the National Football League (NFL). He was selected by the Arizona Cardinals in the fifth round of the 2009 NFL draft. He played college football at LSU.

== Early life ==
At birth, Johnson weighed 15 pounds and 14 ounces, making him the largest baby ever born in the state of Louisiana. Johnson lived in Olla, Louisiana before his family moved to Texas. He still has deep family ties in the Olla area.

Johnson attended Denton High School in Denton, Texas. As a senior, he allegedly did not allow an entire sack the whole season. He played in the U.S. Army All-American Bowl in 2003.

Considered a four-star recruit by Rivals.com, Johnson was listed as the No. 3 offensive tackle prospect in the nation.

== College career ==
Johnson played college football at Louisiana State University from 2004 to 2008. He finished his career starting 38 of 52 games for the Tigers and was a member of their 2007 national championship team.

== Professional career ==
Pre-draft measurables
Height	Weight	Arm length	Hand span	40-yard dash	10-yard split	20-yard split	20-yard shuttle	Three-cone drill	Vertical jump	Broad jump	Bench press
6 ft 7 1/4 in (2.01 m)	364 lb (165 kg)	36 1/2 in (0.93 m)	11 3/8 in (0.29 m)	5.63 s	2.00 s	3.28 s	5.01 s	8.58 s	26 1/2 in (0.67 m)	7 ft 10 in (2.39 m)	21 reps
Values from NFL Combine and Pro Day

=== Arizona Cardinals ===
Johnson was selected by the Arizona Cardinals in the fifth round of the 2009 NFL draft. According to The Sporting News, Johnson was regarded as "somewhat of a 'tweener because he is almost too tall to play guard in most teams' schemes, but at the same time he lacks the athleticism to play tackle effectively in the NFL."

On September 3, 2010, Johnson was cut from the Arizona Cardinals in order to make the 53 man limit for the 2010 season. He was later placed on the team's practice squad.

=== Chicago Bears ===
He signed a two-year deal with the Chicago Bears on December 7, 2010. He was waived by Chicago on July 30, 2011.
