= Will Blackwell (offensive lineman) =

American football player (born 1989)

No. 60
- Position: Guard

Personal information
- Born: January 24, 1989 (age 37); West Monroe, Louisiana, U.S.
- Listed height: 6 ft 3 in (1.91 m)
- Listed weight: 300 lb (136 kg)

Career information
- High school: West Monroe (LA)
- College: LSU
- NFL draft: 2012: undrafted

Career history
- Carolina Panthers (2012)*
- * Offseason or practice squad member only

Awards and highlights
- BCS national champion (2007); First-team All-American (2011); First-team All-SEC (2011)

William Blackwell (born January 24, 1989) is a former college football player.

== College career ==
He was a prominent guard for the LSU Tigers of Louisiana State University. In 2011, Blackwell was selected an All-American by The Sporting News and was a consensus All-Southeastern Conference selection.

== Professional career ==
Blackwell was signed as an undrafted free agent by the Carolina Panthers of the National Football League (NFL) but was cut during the preseason.
