= Dennis Johnson (coach) =

American football coach (born 1988)

New York Giants
- Title: Defensive line coach

Personal information
- Born: November 9, 1988 (age 37); Amory, Mississippi, U.S.

Career information
- Position: Defensive tackle
- High school: Amory High School (Amory, Mississippi)
- College: Itawamba CC (2007); LSU (2008–2011)

Career history
- Northwestern State (2012–2013) Graduate assistant; LSU (2014–2015) Graduate assistant; LSU (2016–2017) Outside linebackers coach; LSU (2018–2019) Defensive line coach; Baylor (2020–2023) Defensive line coach; Baltimore Ravens (2024–2025) Defensive line coach; New York Giants (2026–present) Defensive line coach

Dennis Stephrone Johnson (born November 9, 1988) is an American football coach who is the defensive line coach for the New York Giants of the National Football League (NFL).

== Early years ==
Johnson transferred in 2008 from Itawamba Community College to LSU. In his 3 years with LSU, he played in 19 games with no starts. He finished his college career with 11 total tackles. He graduated from LSU in May 2012 with a degree in general studies and added a master's degree in Health Promotion and Administration from Northwestern State in 2014.

== Coaching career ==
=== Northwestern State ===
Johnson joined the Northwestern State coaching staff in 2012 as the linebackers coach. The following year he also worked with the secondary

=== Louisiana State University ===
Following his stint at Northwestern State, he returned to his alma mater, LSU in 2014 as the defensive line coach. After Ed Orgeron was promoted to head coach, Johnson moved to coaching the linebackers. Due to medical reasons, he moved to an analyst position with the Tigers in 2019.

=== Baylor ===
He returned to a coaching position when he joined Baylor as their defensive line coach. He helped coach future NFL players, Siaki Ika and Gabe Hall.

=== Baltimore Ravens ===
Following the 2023 season, Johnson joined his first NFL team as he joined the Baltimore Ravens as their new defensive coach following the departure of Anthony Weaver.

=== New York Giants ===
On January 27, 2026, Johnson was hired to serve as the defensive line coach for the New York Giants under new head coach John Harbaugh.
