= Doug Mallory =

American football player and coach (born 1964)

Profile
- Position: Defensive coach

Personal information
- Born: November 2, 1964 (age 62); Bowling Green, Ohio, U.S.

Career information
- High school: DeKalb (DeKalb, Illinois)
- University: Michigan (1984–1987)

Career history
- Indiana (1988) Graduate assistant; Army (1989) Offensive line coach; Western Kentucky (1990–1991) Special teams coordinator & inside linebackers coach; Western Kentucky (1992–1993) Defensive coordinator; Indiana (1994–1996) Special teams coordinator & defensive backs coach; Maryland (1997–2000) Defensive backs coach; Oklahoma State (2001–2004) Defensive backs coach; LSU (2005–2007) Defensive backs coach; LSU (2008) Co-defensive coordinator; New Mexico (2009–2010) Defensive coordinator; Indiana (2011–2013) Assistant head coach, co-defensive coordinator, & safeties coach; Atlanta Falcons (2015–2016) Defensive assistant; Atlanta Falcons (2017–2019) Defensive backs coach; Atlanta Falcons (2020) Senior defensive assistant & defensive backs coach; Michigan (2021–2023) Analyst / assistant defensive backs coach; Baltimore Ravens (2024) Defensive backs coach

Awards and highlights
- 2× NCAA national champion (2007, 2023); Second-team All-Big Ten (1987)

Doug Mallory (born November 2, 1964) is an American football coach and former player. He started coaching in 1988 and has held defensive coordinator positions at Western Kentucky University, Louisiana State University (LSU) and the University of New Mexico. He also coached collegiately at Army, Indiana, Maryland, Michigan, Oklahoma State; and in the National Football League (NFL) for the Atlanta Falcons and the Baltimore Ravens. Mallory played college football as a defensive back at the University of Michigan from 1984 to 1987 under Bo Schembechler.

== Early life ==
Mallory is the middle son of former college football coach Bill Mallory. Doug attended DeKalb High School in DeKalb, Illinois, while his father was the head coach at Northern Illinois.

Mallory played college football for the Michigan Wolverines under head coach Bo Schembechler from 1984 to 1987. He was a reserve defensive back on the 1985 team that won the Fiesta Bowl and finished No. 2 in both the AP and Coaches Polls. He played on the same defense as his older brother Mike, a senior All-Big Ten linebacker. Mallory was named a co-captain as a senior of the 1987 team. Mallory finished his Michigan career with 182 tackles and 6 interceptions.

== Coaching career ==
Mallory began his coaching career at Indiana University Bloomington as a graduate assistant for his father, Bill, who had become the Hoosiers’ head coach in 1984. After coaching stops at Army, Western Kentucky, Indiana and Maryland, he was hired by Les Miles to coach the secondary at Oklahoma State. From 2001 to 2004, Mallory's Oklahoma State secondary intercepted 54 passes.

When Miles was hired in 2005 to be the head coach at Louisiana State University, Mallory followed him to Baton Rouge to become the defensive backs coach for the Tigers. After 3 years in this position, including the 2007–08 National Championship season, Mallory was promoted to co-defensive coordinator.

Mallory spent the 2009 and 2010 seasons at the defensive coordinator at the University of New Mexico before being hired back to Indiana. Under head coach Kevin Wilson, Mallory has served as the assistant head coach, co-defensive coordinator, and safeties coach for the Hoosiers.

On January 10, 2014, Indiana announced that Mallory would not be returning for the 2014 season.

On February 10, 2015, Mallory was introduced as a part of the coaching staff for Dan Quinn of the Atlanta Falcons.

In the 2016 season, Mallory and the Falcons reached Super Bowl LI, where they faced the New England Patriots. In the Super Bowl, the Falcons fell in a 34–28 overtime defeat.

On February 5, 2024, the Baltimore Ravens hired Mallory to serve as their defensive backs coach. On February 15, 2025, the Ravens and Mallory parted ways.

== Personal life ==
Mallory’s father, Bill, is the winningest coach in Indiana football history. Mallory has two brothers that are currently football coaches: Older brother Mike, is the special teams coordinator for the Jacksonville Jaguars of the NFL, and younger brother, Curt, is the head coach for the Indiana State Sycamores football team. All 3 brothers played collegiately for the Michigan Wolverines. He has an eldest sister, Barb.

Doug and his wife, Lisa, have three daughters: Emily, Allison, and Sarah.
