= Curtis Taylor (American football) =

American football player (born 1985)

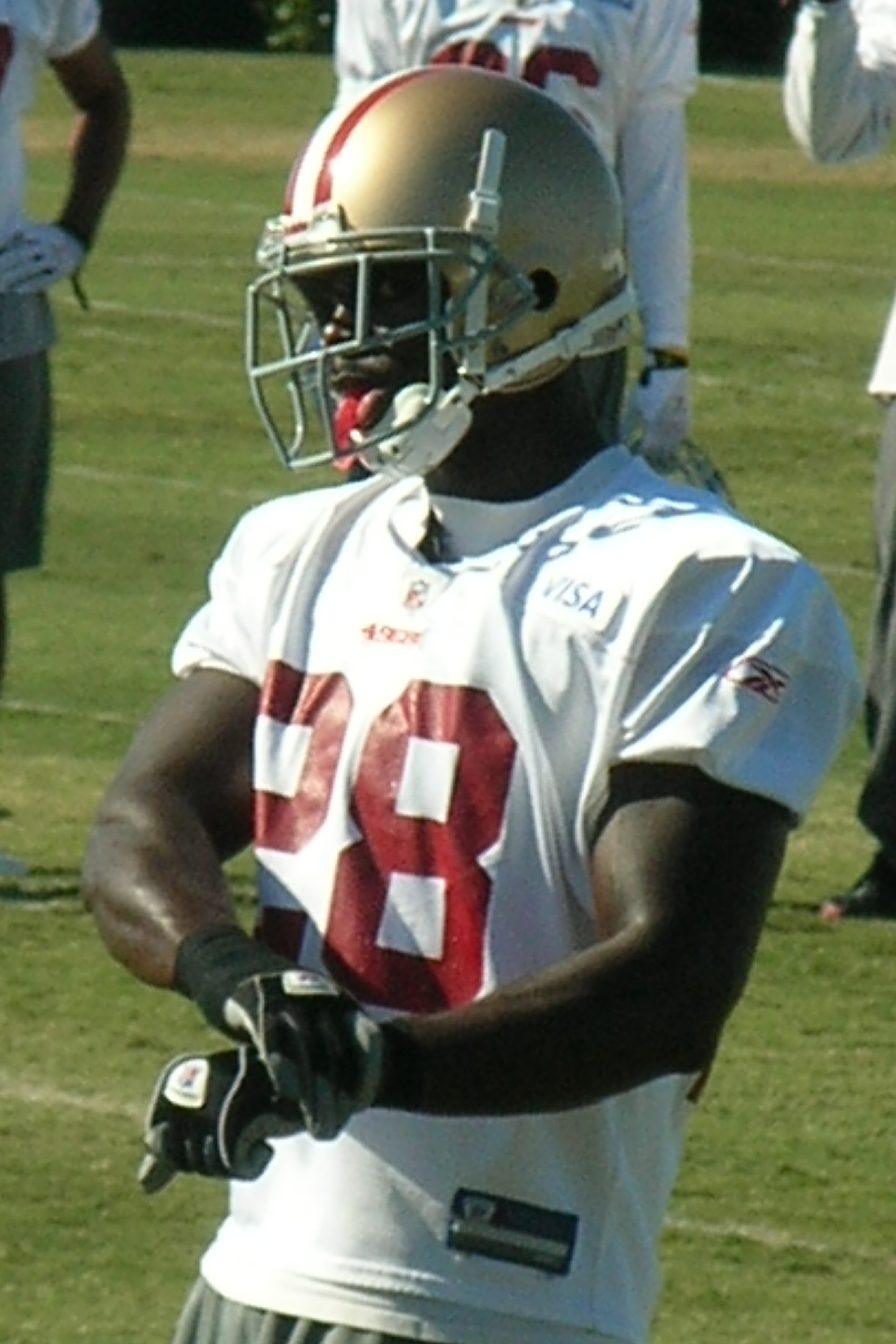
- Taylor with the San Francisco 49ers in 2010

No. 28, 25, 27
- Position: Safety

Personal information
- Born: July 13, 1985 (age 41); Bogalusa, Louisiana, U.S.
- Listed height: 6 ft 2 in (1.88 m)
- Listed weight: 212 lb (96 kg)

Career information
- High school: Franklinton (LA)
- College: LSU
- NFL draft: 2009: 7th round, 219th overall pick

Career history
- San Francisco 49ers (2009–2010); Oakland Raiders (2012)*; Sacramento Mountain Lions (2012); San Francisco 49ers (2012)*; Arizona Cardinals (2013); Winnipeg Blue Bombers (2015)*
- * Offseason or practice squad member only

Awards and highlights
- BCS national champion (2008)

Career NFL statistics
- Total tackles: 7
- Stats at Pro Football Reference

Curtis Trishton Taylor (born July 13, 1985) is an American former professional football player who was a safety in the National Football League (NFL). He played college football for the LSU Tigers and was selected by the San Francisco 49ers in the seventh round of the 2009 NFL draft.

Taylor was also a member of the Oakland Raiders, Sacramento Mountain Lions, Arizona Cardinals, and Winnipeg Blue Bombers.

== Early life ==
He played high school football at Franklinton High School in Franklinton, Louisiana.

== Professional career ==
Pre-draft measurables
Height	Weight	Arm length	Hand span	40-yard dash	10-yard split	20-yard split	20-yard shuttle	Three-cone drill	Vertical jump	Broad jump	Bench press
6 ft 2 1/4 in (1.89 m)	209 lb (95 kg)	33 1/2 in (0.85 m)	9 1/4 in (0.23 m)	4.49 s	1.53 s	2.62 s	4.23 s	7.25 s	37.5 in (0.95 m)	10 ft 9 in (3.28 m)	13 reps
All values from NFL Combine/Pro Day

=== San Francisco 49ers (first stint) ===
Taylor was selected in the seventh round, 219th overall pick, by the San Francisco 49ers in the 2009 NFL draft. He was released by the 49ers on September 3, 2011.

=== Oakland Raiders ===
On January 5, 2012, Taylor signed a future/reserve contract with the Oakland Raiders.

=== San Francisco 49ers (second stint) ===
The 49ers re-signed Taylor to the team's practice squad on December 26, 2012.

=== Arizona Cardinals ===
Taylor signed with the Arizona Cardinals on April 3, 2013. He was released on August 30, 2013. After re-signing with the team and spending time on the practice squad, Taylor was elevated to the active roster on December 10, 2013, after a season-ending injury to safety Tyrann Mathieu. The Cardinals released Taylor on August 30, 2014.

=== Winnipeg Blue Bombers ===
Taylor signed with the Winnipeg Blue Bombers on May 21, 2015. He was released on June 12, 2015.

== Personal life ==
His younger brother is former San Diego Chargers safety, Brandon Taylor, who was selected by the Chargers in the third round of the 2012 NFL draft after also playing for Louisiana State.
