= Harry Coleman =

American gridiron football player (born 1985)

No. 57
- Position: Linebacker

Personal information
- Born: November 10, 1985 (age 40); Franklin, Louisiana, U.S.
- Listed height: 6 ft 2 in (1.88 m)
- Listed weight: 206 lb (93 kg)

Career information
- High school: West St. Mary (Baldwin, Louisiana)
- College: LSU
- NFL draft: 2010: undrafted

Career history
- New Orleans Saints (2010)*; Hartford Colonials (2010); Edmonton Eskimos (2012)*
- * Offseason or practice squad member only

Awards and highlights
- BCS National Championship (2008); AFFL Amateur champion (2018); AFFL Ultimate champion (2018)

Harry Corday Coleman (born November 10, 1985) is an American former football linebacker. He played college football at LSU as a safety and was switched to linebacker during his senior year. He signed with the New Orleans Saints as an undrafted free agent, but was subsequently released by the team on July 21, 2010. In high school, Coleman played football, basketball, and baseball. He was later re-signed by the Saints on August 14, 2010. Coleman would ultimately be released again before he ended up in the United Football League. He signed with the Edmonton Eskimos on May 9, 2012, but was released on June 23, 2012. In 2018, Coleman was a member of the amateur flag football team Fighting Cancer during the American Flag Football League's first US Open of Football. Fighting Cancer was crowned the America's Champions for winning the amateur branch of the tournament and faced the Professional Champion team, Godspeed, in the Ultimate Final, which they also won.
