= Lazarius Levingston =

American gridiron football player (born 1987)

No. 92, 93, 78
- Position: Defensive end

Personal information
- Born: November 16, 1987 (age 38); Monroe, Louisiana, U.S.
- Listed height: 6 ft 4 in (1.93 m)
- Listed weight: 292 lb (132 kg)

Career information
- High school: Ruston (Ruston, Louisiana)
- College: LSU
- NFL draft: 2011: 7th round, 205th overall pick

Career history
- Seattle Seahawks (2011); Tampa Bay Buccaneers (2012); BC Lions (2016)*
- * Offseason or practice squad member only

Awards and highlights
- BCS national champion (2008)

Career NFL statistics
- Total tackles: 3
- Stats at Pro Football Reference

Lazarius Cortez Levingston (born November 16, 1987) is an American former professional football player who was a defensive end in the National Football League (NFL). Levingston played college football for the LSU Tigers.

Pre-draft measurables
Height	Weight	Arm length	Hand span	Wingspan	40-yard dash	10-yard split	20-yard split	20-yard shuttle	Three-cone drill	Vertical jump	Broad jump	Bench press
6 ft 3 1/2 in (1.92 m)	292 lb (132 kg)	33 in (0.84 m)	10 3/8 in (0.26 m)	6 ft 7 3/8 in (2.02 m)	4.86 s	1.79 s	2.96 s	4.62 s	7.29 s	31.0 in (0.79 m)	8 ft 8 in (2.64 m)	20 reps
All values from NFL Combine/Pro Day

He was selected by the Seattle Seahawks in the seventh round of the 2011 NFL draft with the 205th overall pick. He was waived with an injury settlement on August 31, 2012. He was signed by the BC Lions on February 19, 2016, and released by the team on May 29, 2016.

Levingston attended Ruston High School, in Ruston, Louisiana, United States, where he was a three star recruit according to Rivals.com.
