= Ciron Black =

American football player (born 1986)

No. 70
- Position: Offensive tackle

Personal information
- Born: October 29, 1986 (age 40); Tyler, Texas, U.S.
- Listed height: 6 ft 5 in (1.96 m)
- Listed weight: 310 lb (141 kg)

Career information
- High school: Tyler (TX) Lee
- College: LSU
- NFL draft: 2010: undrafted

Awards and highlights
- BCS national champion (2007); Jacobs Blocking Trophy (2009); First-team All-SEC (2009); 2× Second-team All-SEC (2007, 2008)

Ciron Qunadra Black (born October 29, 1986) is an American former football offensive tackle for the LSU Tigers. Black holds the LSU record for career starts at 53, and one off the all-time NCAA football record.

== Early life ==
A native of Tyler, Texas, Black attended Robert E. Lee High School, where he was teammates with Matt Flynn, Justin Warren, and Brandon Pettigrew. As a senior, Black averaged four pancake blocks per game and was named first-team 5A all-state in Texas. Was a 3-year letterman in football and was a member of the baseball, track, and basketball teams.

Considered a three-star prospect by Rivals.com, Black was listed as the No. 12 offensive guard prospect in the nation. Scout.com rated Black as a four star prospect and the 31st best offensive tackle prospect in the nation.

== College career ==
After redshirting his initial year at LSU, Black started all 13 of the Tigers' games at left tackle in 2006, succeeding Andrew Whitworth. Black and Whitworth were the only two players to play at left tackle for LSU between the 2002 season and 2009 season. He earned Freshman All-American honors by the Football Writers Association of American. Still a starter in his sophomore year, he played all 14 games for the Tigers at left offensive tackle, while setting a school-record by playing 1,031 snaps from scrimmage in 2007. He earned second-team All-SEC honors from the SEC Coaches that year.

As a junior, Black ran his streak of consecutive starts at left tackle to 40 straight and was a second team All-SEC selection for the second straight year. He helped pave the way for an LSU team that ranked fourth in the SEC in rushing with 166.8 yards per game. In 2009, Black was listed at No. 4 on Rivals.com′s preseason offensive tackle power ranking. He was also named to the 2009 Outland Trophy watch list.

== Professional career ==
=== 2010 NFL draft ===
Black projected as a right tackle in the NFL. Black went undrafted in the 2010 NFL Draft. Early reports claimed that Black had signed with the Steelers, but those reports were incorrect. He gave a statement in early May saying he would release an official statement concerning his football career in the near future.

Pre-draft measurables
Height	Weight	Arm length	Hand span	40-yard dash	Bench press
6 ft 5 in (1.96 m)	300 lb (136 kg)	33 in (0.84 m)	10 1/8 in (0.26 m)	5.3 s	33 reps of 225 reps
All values from NFL Combine
