= 2011 Alabama Crimson Tide football team =

American college football season

2011 Alabama Crimson Tide football

Consensus national champion

BCS National Championship Game, W 21–0 vs. LSU
- Conference: Southeastern Conference
- Western Division

Ranking
- Coaches: No. 1
- AP: No. 1
- Record: 12–1 (7–1 SEC)
- Head coach: Nick Saban (5th season)
- Offensive coordinator: Jim McElwain (4th season)
- Offensive scheme: Pro-style
- Defensive coordinator: Kirby Smart (4th season)
- Base defense: 3–4
- MVP: Trent Richardson
- Captains: Mark Barron; Dont'a Hightower; Trent Richardson
- Home stadium: Bryant–Denny Stadium

2011 Southeastern Conference football standings
	Conf.			Overall
Team	W		L	W		L
Eastern Division
No. 19 Georgia x	7	–	1	10	–	4
No. 9 South Carolina	6	–	2	11	–	2
Florida	3	–	5	7	–	6
Vanderbilt	2	–	6	6	–	7
Kentucky	2	–	6	5	–	7
Tennessee	1	–	7	5	–	7
Western Division
No. 2 LSU x$	8	–	0	13	–	1
No. 1 Alabama %#	7	–	1	12	–	1
No. 5 Arkansas	6	–	2	11	–	2
Auburn	4	–	4	8	–	5
Mississippi State	2	–	6	7	–	6
Ole Miss*	0	–	8	2	–	10
Championship: LSU 42, Georgia 10
# – BCS National Champion; $ – BCS representative as conference champion; % – BCS at-large representative; x – Division champion/co-champions; * Ole Miss vacated all wins due to NCAA violations.; Rankings from AP Poll

The 2011 Alabama Crimson Tide football team represented the University of Alabama in the 2011 NCAA Division I FBS football season. It was the Crimson Tide's 117th overall and 78th season as a member of the Southeastern Conference (SEC) and its 20th within the SEC Western Division. The team was led by head coach Nick Saban, in his fifth year, and played their home games at Bryant–Denny Stadium in Tuscaloosa, Alabama. They finished the season with a record of twelve wins and one loss (12–1 overall, 7–1 in the SEC) and as consensus national champions.

After the completion of the 2010 season, the Crimson Tide signed a highly rated recruiting class in February 2011 and completed spring practice the following April. With seventeen returning starters from the previous season, Alabama entered their 2011 campaign ranked as the number two team in the nation and as a favorite to win the Western Division and compete for the SEC championship. However, Alabama lost to the LSU Tigers in their regular season matchup, and as a result did not qualify for the 2011 SEC Championship Game. Despite not winning their conference championship, when the final Bowl Championship Series rankings were released, Alabama had the number two ranking to qualify for the 2012 BCS National Championship Game. In the rematch against LSU, the Crimson Tide defeated the Tigers 21–0 to capture their second BCS Championship in three years.

At the conclusion of the season, the Alabama defense led the nation in every major statistical category, and was the first to do so since the 1986 season. Additionally, several players were recognized for the individual accomplishments on the field. Barrett Jones won both the Wuerffel Trophy and the Outland Trophy; and Trent Richardson won the Doak Walker Award, was a finalist for the Heisman Trophy and was named the SEC Offensive Player of the Year. Also, seven players were named to various All-America Teams with Dont'a Hightower being a consensus selection and Mark Barron, Jones and Richardson each being unanimous selections. In April 2012, eight members of the 2011 squad were selected in the NFL draft, with an additional six signed as undrafted free agents to various teams. In 2019, Athlon Sports ranked the 2011 Crimson Tide defense as the greatest college defense of all time.

== Before the season ==
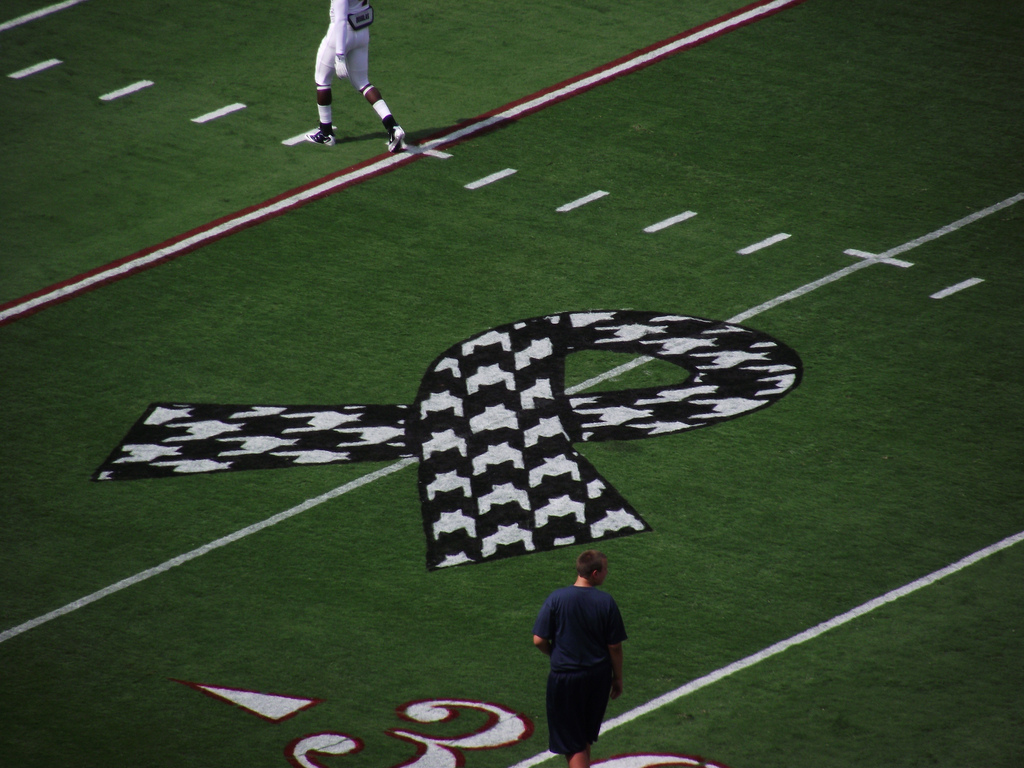
Detail of the houndstooth awareness ribbon painted on-field in remembrance of the victims and damage of the April 2011 tornado.

After winning the BCS National Championship in 2009, Alabama fell short of preseason expectations in 2010 and finished with a record of nine wins and three losses at the conclusion of the regular season. However, they finished with a 49–7 victory in the 2011 Capital One Bowl against Michigan State, and secured Alabama's third straight ten-win season and their third bowl win in four seasons.

In February 2011, Alabama signed the No. 1 recruiting class according to Rivals and the No. 7 recruiting class according to Scout. Spring practice began on March 21 and concluded with the annual A-Day game on April 16. Televised live by ESPNU, the Crimson team of offensive starters defeated the White team of defensive starters by a final score of 14–10 before 92,310 fans in Bryant–Denny Stadium. For their performances, Barrett Jones earned the Dwight Stephenson Lineman of the A-Day Game Award and Trent Richardson earned the Dixie Howell Memorial Most Valuable Player of the A-Day Game Award.

In the weeks after the conclusion of spring practice, a pair of tragedies occurred that directly impacted the team. On April 27, 2011, an EF4 rated tornado devastated Tuscaloosa. As a result of the storm, long snapper Carson Tinker suffered a broken wrist with his girlfriend being one of the 43 fatalities attributed to the storm in Tuscaloosa. On May 12, 2011, offensive lineman Aaron Douglas was found dead in Fernandina Beach, Florida. The cause of death was subsequently ruled accidental as a result of multiple drug toxicity. After transferring to Alabama from Arizona Western College, Douglas struggled with off-field issues including a DUI charge following a December 2010 arrest. He started his career as a freshman All-America at Tennessee, before the Volunteers' new head coach Derek Dooley granted him a release from the program in Spring 2010.

By August, Alabama had a combined 31 players on 12 different preseason award watch lists. These included Mark Barron, Dont'a Hightower, Dre Kirkpatrick, Robert Lester and Courtney Upshaw for the Chuck Bednarik Award; Duron Carter, Darius Hanks and Marquis Maze for the Fred Biletnikoff Award; Hightower, Nico Johnson and Upshaw for the Butkus Award; Lester and Trent Richardson for the Walter Camp Award; Hightower, Barrett Jones, Upshaw and William Vlachos for the Lombardi Award; Michael Williams for the John Mackey Award; Richardson for the Maxwell Award; Barron, Hightower, Kirkpatrick, Lester and Upshaw for the Bronko Nagurski Trophy; Jones and Vlachos for the Outland Trophy; Vlachos for the Rimington Trophy; Barron, Kirkpatrick and Lester for the Jim Thorpe Award; and Richardson for the Doak Walker Award.

Between the conclusion of the 2010 season and the beginning of summer practice in August 2011, seven players transferred from the Crimson Tide. Those who transferred included Robby Green (California University of Pennsylvania), B.J. Scott (South Alabama), Demetrius Goode (North Alabama), Petey Smith (Holmes Community College), Brandon Moore (East Mississippi Community College), Corey Grant (Auburn) and Keiwone Malone (Memphis).

== Coaching staff ==
Alabama head coach Nick Saban entered his fifth year as the Crimson Tide's head coach for the 2011 season. During his previous four years with Alabama, he led the Crimson Tide to an overall record of 38 wins, 11 losses (38–11) and the 2009 national championship. In the weeks after the Capitol One Bowl victory, several changes were made to the Alabama coaching staff. Defensive line coach Bo Davis resigned his position to serve as the defensive tackles coach for Texas, and the next day Chris Rumph was hired from Clemson, to replace him as the defensive line coach. On January 12, assistant head coach and offensive line coach Joe Pendry announced his retirement, and the following day former Miami interim head coach Jeff Stoutland was hired to replace him as offensive line coach. On January 21, wide receivers coach and recruiting coordinator Curt Cignetti resigned his position to accept the head coaching job at Indiana University of Pennsylvania, and on February 7, Mike Groh was hired as his replacement as wide receivers coach and recruiting coordinator.

Name	Position	Seasons at Alabama	Alma mater
Nick Saban	Head coach	5	Kent State (1973)
Burton Burns	Associate head coach, running backs	5	Nebraska (1976)
Mike Groh	Receivers, recruiting coordinator	1	Virginia (1995)
Jim McElwain	Offensive coordinator, quarterbacks	4	Eastern Washington (1984)
Jeremy Pruitt	Secondary	2	West Alabama (1999)
Chris Rumph	Defensive line	1	South Carolina (1994)
Kirby Smart	Defensive coordinator, linebackers	5	Georgia (1999)
Jeff Stoutland	Assistant head coach, offensive line	1	Southern Connecticut (1984)
Sal Sunseri	Assistant head coach, linebackers	3	Pittsburgh (1982)
Bobby Williams	Tight ends, special teams	4	Purdue (1982)
Scott Cochran	Strength and conditioning	5	LSU (2001)

=== Analysts ===
Offensive analysts

- Billy Napier
- Jeff Norrid
- Jody Wright

Defensive analysts

- Dean Altobelli
- Russ Callaway

Special teams analysts

- Joe Judge

=== Graduate assistants ===
- Derrick Ansley
- Glenn Schumann
- Kevin Garver

=== Student assistants ===
- Rob Ezell

== Roster ==
=== Returning starters ===
Alabama had 17 returning starters from the previous season, including ten on defense and seven on offense. The most notable departures from the previous year were defensive end Marcell Dareus, left tackle James Carpenter, tight end Preston Dial, quarterback Greg McElroy, wide receiver Julio Jones and running back Mark Ingram II

==== Offense ====
Player	Class	Position
Michael Williams	Junior	Tight End
Marquis Maze	Senior	Wide Receiver
Darius Hanks	Senior	Wide Receiver
Chance Warmack	Junior	Left Guard
William Vlachos	Senior	Center
Barrett Jones	Junior	Right Guard
D. J. Fluker	Sophomore	Right Tackle

==== Defense ====
Player	Class	Position
Mark Barron	Senior	Safety
Robert Lester	Junior	Safety
Dont'a Hightower	Junior	Linebacker
C. J. Mosley	Sophomore	Linebacker
Courtney Upshaw	Senior	Linebacker
Nico Johnson	Junior	Linebacker
Dre Kirkpatrick	Junior	Cornerback
DeQuan Menzie	Senior	Cornerback
Dee Milliner	Sophomore	Cornerback
Josh Chapman	Senior	Nose Tackle

==== Special teams ====
Player	Class	Position
Cade Foster	Sophomore	Placekicker
Jeremy Shelley	Junior	Placekicker
Cody Mandell	Sophomore	Punter
Carson Tinker	Junior	Long Snapper

=== Depth chart ===
Starters and backups.

Defense

FS
Mark Barron
Will Lowery
Nick Perry

WLB	ILB	ILB	SLB
Courtney Upshaw	Nico Johnson	Dont'a Hightower	⋅
Adrian Hubbard	C. J. Mosley	Chris Jordan	⋅
Xzavier Dickson	Tana Patrick	Trey DePriest	⋅

SS
Robert Lester
Jarrick Williams
Vinnie Sunseri

CB
Dre Kirkpatrick
Phelon Jones
Ha Ha Clinton-Dix

DE	NT	DE
Jesse Williams	Josh Chapman	Damion Square
Quinton Dial	Nick Gentry	Ed Stinson
Undra Billingsly	Jesse Williams	⋅

CB
DeQuan Menzie
Dee Milliner
John Fulton

Offense

WR
Marquis Maze
Brandon Gibson
Kevin Norwood

LT	LG	C	RG	RT
Barrett Jones	Chance Warmack	William Vlachos	Anthony Steen	D. J. Fluker
Cyrus Kouandjio	Barrett Jones	Kellen Williams	John Michael Boswell	Austin Shepherd
Tyler Love	Alfred McCullough	⋅	⋅	⋅

TE
Michael Williams
Chris Underwood
Brian Vogler

WR
DeAndrew White
Darius Hanks
Kenny Bell

QB
A. J. McCarron
Phillip Sims
Phillip Ely

RB
Trent Richardson
Eddie Lacy
Jalston Fowler

FB
Brad Smelley
Ryan Colbaugh
⋅

Special teams
PK Cade Foster
PK Jeremy Shelley
P Cody Mandell
KR Marquis Maze/Darius Hanks
PR Marquis Maze
LS Carson Tinker
H A. J. McCarron

=== Recruiting class ===
Alabama's recruiting class included eleven players from the "ESPN 150": No. 3 Cyrus Kouandjio (OT); No. 19 Ha'Sean Clinton-Dix (S); No. 22 Xzavier Dickson (DE); No. 38 Trey DePriest (OLB); No. 41 Bradley Sylve (WR); No. 53 Jeoffrey Pagan (DE); No. 75 Marvin Shinn (WR); No. 79 Demetrius Hart (RB); No. 82 Malcolm Faciane (TE); No. 137 Danny Woodson Jr. (WR); and No. 140 Brent Calloway (ATH). Alabama signed the No. 1 recruiting class according to Rivals and the No. 7 recruiting class according to Scout. The football program received 14 letters of intent on National Signing Day, February 2, 2011. Prior to National Signing Day, three high school players and three junior college transfers of the 2011 recruiting class enrolled for the spring semester in order to participate in spring practice. These early enrollments included: nose guard Quinton Dial, offensive lineman Aaron Douglas and nose tackle Jesse Williams from junior college and linebacker Trey DePriest, quarterback Phillip Ely safety Vinnie Sunseri from high school.

College recruiting (2011)
Name	Hometown	School	Height	Weight	40^{‡}	Commit date
Brent Calloway; LB	Russellville, Alabama	Russellville High School	6 ft 1 in (1.85 m)	210 lb (95 kg)	4.63	Feb 2, 2011
Brent Calloway; LB	Recruit ratings: Scout: Rivals: 247Sports: ESPN:					
Ha Ha Clinton-Dix; S	Orlando, Florida	Dr. Phillips High School	6 ft 2 in (1.88 m)	190 lb (86 kg)	4.50	Apr 17, 2010
Ha Ha Clinton-Dix; S	Recruit ratings: Scout: Rivals: 247Sports: ESPN:					
Trey DePriest; LB	Springfield, Ohio	Springfield High School	6 ft 2 in (1.88 m)	230 lb (100 kg)	4.69	Jul 30, 2010
Trey DePriest; LB	Recruit ratings: Scout: Rivals: 247Sports: ESPN:					
Quinton Dial; DT	Clay, Alabama	East Mississippi Community College	6 ft 5 in (1.96 m)	310 lb (140 kg)		Feb 4, 2010
Quinton Dial; DT	Recruit ratings: Scout: Rivals: 247Sports: ESPN:					
Xzavier Dickson; DE	Griffin, Georgia	Griffin High School	6 ft 4 in (1.93 m)	248 lb (112 kg)	4.90	Jan 5, 2011
Xzavier Dickson; DE	Recruit ratings: Scout: Rivals: 247Sports: ESPN:					
Aaron Douglas; OT	Maryville, Tennessee	Arizona Western College	6 ft 6 in (1.98 m)	290 lb (130 kg)		Dec 16, 2010
Aaron Douglas; OT	Recruit ratings: Scout: Rivals: 247Sports: ESPN:					
Phillip Ely; QB	Tampa, Florida	Plant High School	6 ft 1 in (1.85 m)	186 lb (84 kg)	4.57	Aug 11, 2010
Phillip Ely; QB	Recruit ratings: Scout: Rivals: 247Sports: ESPN:					
Malcolm Faciane; TE	Picayune, Mississippi	Picayune Memorial High School	6 ft 6 in (1.98 m)	263 lb (119 kg)	4.61	Apr 15, 2010
Malcolm Faciane; TE	Recruit ratings: Scout: Rivals: 247Sports: ESPN:					
LaMichael Fanning; DE	Hamilton, Georgia	Harris County High School	6 ft 7 in (2.01 m)	270 lb (120 kg)	5.00	Apr 17, 2010
LaMichael Fanning; DE	Recruit ratings: Scout: Rivals: 247Sports: ESPN:					
Demetrius Hart; RB	Orlando, Florida	Dr. Phillips High School	5 ft 8 in (1.73 m)	190 lb (86 kg)	4.5	Jan 8, 2011
Demetrius Hart; RB	Recruit ratings: Scout: Rivals: 247Sports: ESPN:					
Christion Jones; CB	Adamsville, Alabama	Minor High School	5 ft 10 in (1.78 m)	175 lb (79 kg)	4.50	Sep 30, 2010
Christion Jones; CB	Recruit ratings: Scout: Rivals: 247Sports: ESPN:					
Ryan Kelly; C	West Chester Township, Butler County, Ohio	Lakota West High School	6 ft 5 in (1.96 m)	280 lb (130 kg)	5.00	Jul 19, 2010
Ryan Kelly; C	Recruit ratings: Scout: Rivals: 247Sports: ESPN:					
Cyrus Kouandjio; OT	Hyattsville, Maryland	DeMatha Catholic High School	6 ft 7 in (2.01 m)	325 lb (147 kg)	5.00	Feb 5, 2011
Cyrus Kouandjio; OT	Recruit ratings: Scout: Rivals: 247Sports: ESPN:					
Isaac Luatua; OG	La Mirada, California	La Mirada High School	6 ft 3 in (1.91 m)	298 lb (135 kg)	4.98	Jun 8, 2010
Isaac Luatua; OG	Recruit ratings: Scout: Rivals: 247Sports: ESPN:					
Jeoffrey Pagan; DE	Asheville, North Carolina	Asheville High School	6 ft 4 in (1.93 m)	272 lb (123 kg)	4.60	Feb 2, 2011
Jeoffrey Pagan; DE	Recruit ratings: Scout: Rivals: 247Sports: ESPN:					
D. J. Pettway; DT	Pensacola, Florida	Pensacola Catholic High School	6 ft 3 in (1.91 m)	255 lb (116 kg)		Apr 19, 2010
D. J. Pettway; DT	Recruit ratings: Scout: Rivals: 247Sports: ESPN:					
Marvin Shinn; WR	Prichard, Alabama	Vigor High School	6 ft 4 in (1.93 m)	195 lb (88 kg)	4.50	Apr 18, 2009
Marvin Shinn; WR	Recruit ratings: Scout: Rivals: 247Sports: ESPN:					
Vinnie Sunseri; LB	Tuscaloosa, Alabama	Northridge High School	6 ft 0 in (1.83 m)	205 lb (93 kg)	4.60	Jun 12, 2010
Vinnie Sunseri; LB	Recruit ratings: Scout: Rivals: 247Sports: ESPN:					
Bradley Sylve; WR	Port Sulphur, Louisiana	South Plaquemines High School	5 ft 11 in (1.80 m)	175 lb (79 kg)	4.40	May 12, 2010
Bradley Sylve; WR	Recruit ratings: Scout: Rivals: 247Sports: ESPN:					
Jabriel Washington; CB	Jackson, Tennessee	Trinity Christian Academy	5 ft 11 in (1.80 m)	165 lb (75 kg)		Apr 18, 2010
Jabriel Washington; CB	Recruit ratings: Scout: Rivals: 247Sports: ESPN:					
Jesse Williams; DT	Brisbane, Australia	Arizona Western College	6 ft 5 in (1.96 m)	340 lb (150 kg)		Sep 4, 2010
Jesse Williams; DT	Recruit ratings: Scout: Rivals: 247Sports: ESPN:					
Danny Woodson; WR	Mobile, Alabama	Le Flore High School	6 ft 2 in (1.88 m)	198 lb (90 kg)	4.5	Mar 13, 2010
Danny Woodson; WR	Recruit ratings: Scout: Rivals: 247Sports: ESPN:					
Overall recruit ranking: Scout: 6 Rivals: 1 ESPN: 2
‡ Refers to 40-yard dash; Note: In many cases, Scout, Rivals, 247Sports, On3, and ESPN may conflict in their listings of height, weight and 40 time.; In these cases, the average was taken. ESPN grades are on a 100-point scale.; Sources: "Scout.com Football Recruiting: Alabama". Scout.; "2011 Player Signees- Alabama". ESPN.; "Scout.com Team Recruiting Rankings". Scout.; "2011 Team Ranking". Rivals.com.

== Schedule ==
The 2011 schedule was officially released on October 19, 2010. In accordance with conference rules, Alabama faced all five Western Division opponents: Arkansas, Auburn, LSU, Mississippi State, and Ole Miss. They also faced three Eastern Division opponents: official SEC rival Tennessee, Florida, and Vanderbilt. Alabama did not play SEC opponents Georgia, Kentucky or South Carolina. The contest against Vanderbilt served as the 2011 homecoming game.

Alabama played four non-conference games. The game against Penn State was originally scheduled to be played as part of the 2004 season, however the series was moved back to this season at the request of Alabama due to fallout from NCAA sanctions being levied on the program. The non-conference schedule also included games against Kent State of the Mid-American Conference, North Texas of the Sun Belt Conference and Georgia Southern of the Southern Conference. Alabama had one bye week after the Tennessee game and prior to the first LSU game. On December 4, 2011, the final Bowl Championship Series standings were unveiled with a rematch between No. 1 LSU and No. 2 Alabama in the BCS National Championship Game. The Sagarin computer ratings calculated Alabama's 2011 strength of schedule to be the fifteenth most difficult out of the 246 Division I teams. The Cosgrove Computer Rankings calculated it as the twenty-ninth most difficult out of the 120 Division I FBS teams in its rankings.

In addition to the weekly television coverage, radio coverage for all games was broadcast statewide on The Crimson Tide Sports Network (CTSN). The radio announcers for the 2011 season were Eli Gold with play-by-play, Phil Savage with color commentary, and Chris Stewart with sideline reports.

Date	Time	Opponent	Rank	Site	TV	Result	Attendance
September 3	11:21 a.m.	Kent State*	No. 2	Bryant–Denny Stadium; Tuscaloosa, AL	SECN	W 48–7	101,821
September 10	2:30 p.m.	at No. 23 Penn State*	No. 3	Beaver Stadium; University Park, PA (rivalry)	ABC	W 27–11	107,846
September 17	6:30 p.m.	North Texas*	No. 2	Bryant–Denny Stadium; Tuscaloosa, AL	SECRN	W 41–0	101,821
September 24	2:30 p.m.	No. 14 Arkansas	No. 3	Bryant–Denny Stadium; Tuscaloosa, AL	CBS	W 38–14	101,821
October 1	7:00 p.m.	at No. 12 Florida	No. 3	Ben Hill Griffin Stadium; Gainesville, FL (rivalry)	CBS	W 38–10	90,888
October 8	6:00 p.m.	Vanderbilt^{†}	No. 2	Bryant–Denny Stadium; Tuscaloosa, AL	ESPNU	W 34–0	101,821
October 15	5:00 p.m.	at Ole Miss	No. 2	Vaught–Hemingway Stadium; Oxford, MS (rivalry)	ESPN2	W 52–7	61,792
October 22	6:00 p.m.	Tennessee	No. 2	Bryant–Denny Stadium; Tuscaloosa, AL (Third Saturday in October)	ESPN2	W 37–6	101,821
November 5	7:00 p.m.	No. 1 LSU	No. 2	Bryant–Denny Stadium; Tuscaloosa, AL (rivalry / College GameDay)	CBS	L 6–9 ^{OT}	101,821
November 12	6:45 p.m.	at Mississippi State	No. 3	Davis Wade Stadium; Starkville, MS (rivalry)	ESPN	W 24–7	57,871
November 19	1:00 p.m.	No. 3 (FCS) Georgia Southern*	No. 3	Bryant–Denny Stadium; Tuscaloosa, AL	PPV	W 45–21	101,821
November 26	2:30 p.m.	at No. 24 Auburn	No. 2	Jordan–Hare Stadium; Auburn, AL (Iron Bowl / College GameDay)	CBS	W 42–14	87,451
January 9, 2012	7:30 p.m.	vs. No. 1 LSU	No. 2	Mercedes-Benz Superdome; New Orleans, LA (BCS National Championship Game / rivalry / College GameDay)	ESPN	W 21–0	78,237
*Non-conference game; ^{†}Homecoming; Rankings from AP Poll and BCS Standings after October 16 released prior to game; All times are in Central time

- Source: Rolltide.com: 2011 Alabama football schedule

== Game summaries ==
=== Kent State ===
Team	1	2	3	4	Total
Kent State	0	0	7	0	7
• #2 Alabama	21	3	14	10	48

- Location: Tuscaloosa, Alabama
- Game start: 11:23 a.m.
- Elapsed time: 3:28
- Game attendance: 101,821
- Game weather: 96°, partly cloudy, winds ESE 9 mph
- Referee: Matt Moore
- TV announcers (SEC Network): Dave Neal (play-by-play), Andre Ware (color), Cara Capuano (sideline)

Scoring summary
1	10:22	Alabama	Trent Richardson 1-yard run (Jeremy Shelley kick)	Alabama 7–0
1	8:03	Alabama	Marquis Maze 24-yard pass from A. J. McCarron (Jeremy Shelley kick)	Alabama 14–0
1	0:26	Alabama	Trent Richardson 9-yard run (Jeremy Shelley kick)	Alabama 21–0
2	1:35	Alabama	Jeremy Shelley 36-yard field goal	Alabama 24–0
3	9:13	Kent State	Justin Thompson 3-yard pass from Spencer Keith (Freddy Cortez kick)	Alabama 24–7
3	5:16	Alabama	Trent Richardson 1-yard run (Jeremy Shelley kick)	Alabama 31–7
3	4:04	Alabama	Eddie Lacy 1-yard run (Jeremy Shelley kick)	Alabama 38–7
4	13:27	Alabama	Jalston Fowler 49-yard run (Jeremy Shelley kick)	Alabama 45–7
4	5:27	Alabama	Jeremy Shelley 32-yard field goal	Alabama 48–7

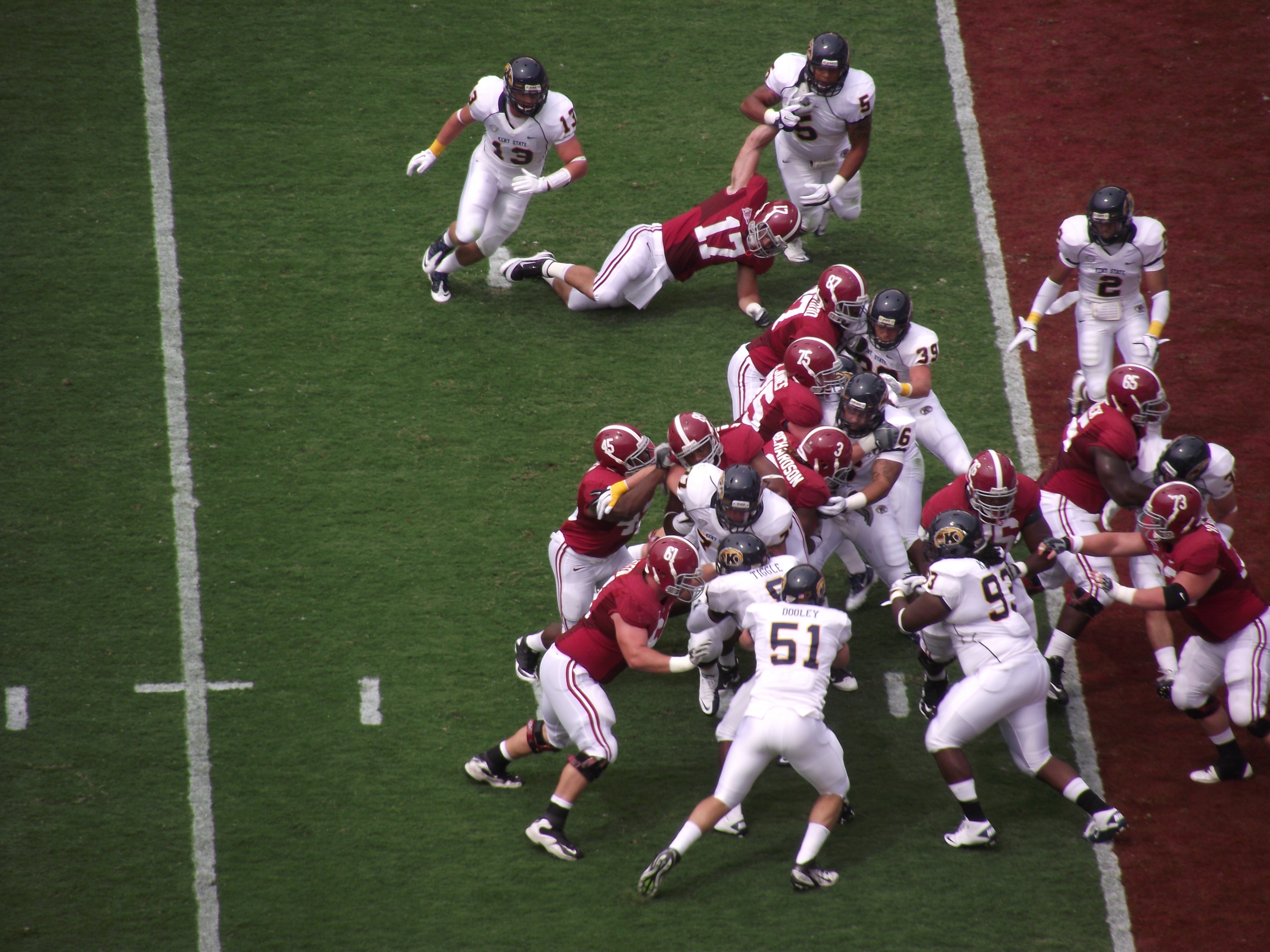
Trent Richardson running the ball towards the endzone against the Kent State defensive line.

The Crimson Tide opened the 2011 season at home against Nick Saban's alma mater, the Kent State Golden Flashes of the Mid-American Conference. In the meeting that was the first all-time against the Golden Flashes, the Crimson Tide won 48–7. After holding the Golden Flashes to a three-and-out on the opening possession, Trent Richardson scored the Crimson Tide's first touchdown on a one-yard run to give Alabama a 7–0 lead. After holding Kent State again to a three-and-out, Alabama responded with a four-play, 74-yard touchdown drive that featured a 48-yard Eddie Lacy reception and a 24-yard Marquis Maze touchdown reception from A. J. McCarron to take a 14–0 lead. The Tide scored their final points of the first quarter on a one-yard Richardson run to take a 21–0 lead into the second quarter. After only scoring on a 36-yard Jeremy Shelley field goal in the second quarter, Alabama led 24–0 at the half.

On the second Crimson Tide possession of the third quarter, Phillip Sims threw an interception to Norman Wolfe that was returned to the Alabama three-yard line. Two plays later, Kent State scored their only points of the game when Spencer Keith connected with Justin Thompson for a three-yard touchdown reception to cut the lead to 24–7. The Crimson Tide responded with touchdowns on the next two consecutive drives. Richardson and Lacy both scored on one-yard runs to extend Alabama's lead to 38–7 entering the fourth quarter. In the fourth, the Tide scored their final touchdown of the afternoon on a 49-yard Jalston Fowler run and their final points on a 32-yard Shelley field goal to make the final score 48–7. For the game, Alabama's defense was dominant in allowing −9 yards rushing and 90 yards of total offense against Kent State in the contest. On offense, the Crimson Tide had 482 total yards with three different running backs scoring touchdowns and Maze totaling 118 yards receiving on eight catches with one touchdown.

=== Penn State ===
Team	1	2	3	4	Total
• #3 Alabama	7	10	3	7	27
#23 Penn State	3	0	0	8	11

- Location: University Park, Pennsylvania
- Game start: 3:37 p.m.
- Elapsed time: 3:20
- Game attendance: 107,846
- Game weather: 77°, partly sunny, winds N 5–10 mph
- Referee: Matt Austin
- TV announcers (ABC): Brad Nessler (play-by-play), Todd Blackledge (color), Holly Rowe (sideline)

Scoring summary
1	7:26	Penn State	Evan Lewis 43-yard field goal	Penn State 3–0
1	0:25	Alabama	Michael Williams 5-yard pass from A. J. McCarron (Jeremy Shelley kick)	Alabama 7–3
2	10:08	Alabama	Jeremy Shelley 22-yard field goal	Alabama 10–3
2	0:35	Alabama	Trent Richardson 3-yard run (Jeremy Shelley kick)	Alabama 17–3
3	4:50	Alabama	Jeremy Shelley 18-yard field goal	Alabama 20–3
4	6:14	Alabama	Trent Richardson 13-yard run (Jeremy Shelley kick)	Alabama 27–3
4	1:53	Penn State	Silas Redd 1-yard run (Rob Bolden run)	Alabama 27–11

In what was the second consecutive meeting between the Crimson Tide and the Penn State Nittany Lions, and first at Happy Valley since 1989, Alabama won 27–11. Penn State took the opening possession down the field and recorded a 43-yard field goal by Evan Lewis to take an early 3–0 lead by using all 3 of their timeouts. Alabama took a 7–3 lead later in the first quarter after A. J. McCarron connected with Michael Williams for a five-yard touchdown reception to cap an 11-play, 69-yard drive. A 22-yard Jeremy Shelley kick extended the Crimson Tide lead to 10–3 early in the second quarter. Then after trading punts, Dre Kirkpatrick forced Andrew Szczerba to fumble the ball that was recovered by Alabama's DeQuan Menzie. Ten plays later, the Crimson Tide led 17–3 after a three-yard Trent Richardson touchdown run.

In the third quarter Shelley connected on an 18-yard field goal and Richardson scored his second rushing touchdown of the game midway through the fourth on a 13-yard run to give Alabama a 27–3 lead. The final points of the game came late in the fourth when Silas Redd scored on a one-yard touchdown for the Nittany Lions, and Rob Bolden converted the two-point conversion to bring the final score to 27–11.

Trent Richardson ran for 111 yards and two touchdowns while Eddie Lacy ran for 85. A. J. McCarron threw for 163 yards and a touchdown. For his seven tackles, interception and fumble recovery, Mark Barron was named SEC Defensive Player of the Week. The 107,846 fans in attendance were the most to ever see an Alabama squad compete on the gridiron, and the victory improved their all-time record against the Nittany Lions to 10–5. The outcome was also noted as the final career loss for Joe Paterno as the Nittany Lions' head coach.

=== North Texas ===
Team	1	2	3	4	Total
North Texas	0	0	0	0	0
• #2 Alabama	10	10	7	14	41

- Location: Tuscaloosa, Alabama
- Game start: 6:38 p.m.
- Elapsed time: 3:10
- Game attendance: 101,821
- Game weather: 80°, partly cloudy, winds ENE 4 mph
- Referee: Ken Williamson
- TV announcers (Fox Sports South): Bob Rathbun (play-by-play), Tim Couch (color), Kristina Akra (sideline)

Scoring summary
1	9:54	Alabama	Jeremy Shelley 26-yard field goal	Alabama 3–0
1	3:39	Alabama	Trent Richardson 4-yard run (Jeremy Shelley kick)	Alabama 10–0
2	14:14	Alabama	Eddie Lacy 43-yard run (Jeremy Shelley kick)	Alabama 17–0
2	8:11	Alabama	Jeremy Shelley 37-yard field goal	Alabama 20–0
3	9:39	Alabama	Trent Richardson 58-yard run (Jeremy Shelley kick)	Alabama 27–0
4	13:01	Alabama	Trent Richardson 71-yard run (Jeremy Shelley kick)	Alabama 34–0
4	11:49	Alabama	Eddie Lacy 67-yard run (Jeremy Shelley kick)	Alabama 41–0

In their meeting against the North Texas Mean Green, Alabama outgained their opponent 586 to 169 yards of total offense in Alabama's 41–0 victory. After a 26-yard Jeremy Shelley field goal gave the Crimson Tide a 3–0 lead, Trent Richardson scored their first touchdown of the evening on Alabama's second offensive possession to give them a 10–0 lead at the end of the first period. The Crimson Tide extended their lead to 20–0 by halftime after a 43-yard Eddie Lacy touchdown run and a 37-yard Shelley field goal in the second quarter.

North Texas opened the second half with a nine-play, 54-yard drive to set up a 42-yard Zach Olen field goal attempt. However, the kick was blocked by Robert Lester to preserve the shutout. Alabama extended their lead to 27–0 by the fourth quarter after Richardson scored his second touchdown of the evening on a 58-yard run. After Shelley missed a 42-yard field goal on the first play of the fourth quarter, Richardson scored again with a 71-yard touchdown run on Alabama's next offensive possession to extend their lead to 34–0. Lacy scored the final points of the game midway through the fourth with his second touchdown of the evening on a 67-yard run to give Alabama the 41–0 victory.

Trent Richardson ran for a career-high 167 yards and three touchdowns and Eddie Lacy ran for 161 yards and two touchdowns and became the first pair of running backs to each run for 150 yards in a game. The shutout was the Crimson Tide's first since they defeated Chattanooga 45–0 in 2009 and improved Alabama's all-time record against the Mean Green to 4–0.

=== Arkansas ===
Team	1	2	3	4	Total
#14 Arkansas	7	0	7	0	14
• #3 Alabama	7	10	21	0	38

- Location: Tuscaloosa, Alabama
- Game start: 2:40 p.m.
- Elapsed time: 3:04
- Game attendance: 101,821
- Game weather: 80°, sunny, winds NNE 3 mph
- Referee: Hubert Owens
- TV announcers (CBS): Verne Lundquist (play-by-play), Gary Danielson (color), Tracy Wolfson (sideline)

Scoring summary
1	11:48	Alabama	Michael Williams 37-yard pass from A. J. McCarron (Jeremy Shelley kick)	Alabama 7–0
1	1:18	Arkansas	Dennis Johnson 10-yard pass from Tyler Wilson (Zach Hocker kick)	7–7
2	5:35	Alabama	Jeremy Shelley 20-yard field goal	Alabama 10–7
2	4:38	Alabama	DeQuan Menzie 25-yard interception return (Jeremy Shelley kick)	Alabama 17–7
3	11:29	Alabama	Marquis Maze 83-yard punt return (Jeremy Shelley kick)	Alabama 24–7
3	9:57	Alabama	Trent Richardson 61-yard pass from A. J. McCarron (Jeremy Shelley kick)	Alabama 31–7
3	8:54	Arkansas	Cobi Hamilton 19-yard pass from Tyler Wilson (Zach Hocker kick)	Alabama 31–14
3	0:48	Alabama	Eddie Lacy 4-yard run	Alabama 38–14

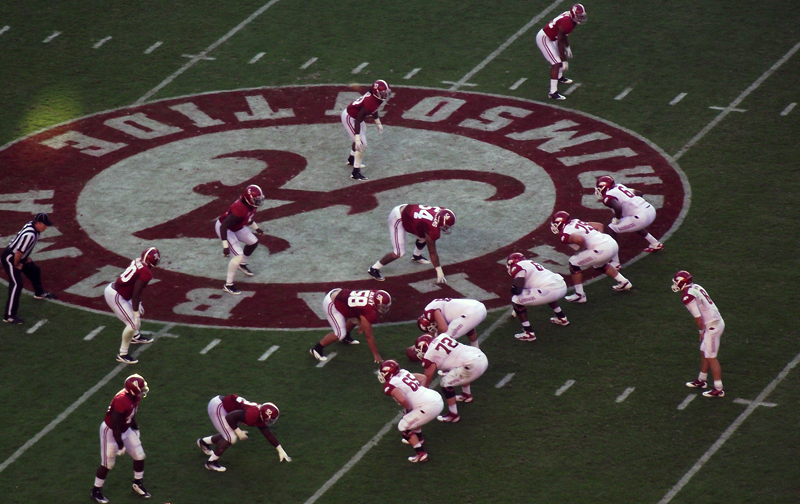
The Crimson Tide defense awaits the Tyler Wilson snap for the Razorbacks at midfield.

After three consecutive victories to start the season, the Crimson Tide opened conference play against the Arkansas Razorbacks, and defeated them 38–14 at Bryant–Denny Stadium. Alabama scored first with a trick play on their opening possession. After driving to the Arkansas 37-yard line, Cade Foster lined up for a 54-yard field goal attempt. Alabama quarterback A. J. McCarron received the snap as the holder, and proceeded to throw a 37-yard touchdown pass to Michael Williams to give the Crimson Tide a 7–0 lead. The Razorbacks tied the game at 7–7 late in the first quarter when Tyler Wilson threw a ten-yard touchdown pass to Dennis Johnson. After an Arkansas goal line stand, Jeremy Shelley connected on a 20-yard field goal to give Alabama a 10–7 lead. On the ensuing Arkansas possession, the Crimson Tide scored when DeQuan Menzie intercepted a Wilson pass and returned it 25-yards for a touchdown to give Alabama a 17–7 lead at the half.

After holding Arkansas scoreless on their first possession of the third quarter, Alabama's Marquis Maze returned a Dylan Breeding punt 83-yards for a touchdown and a 24–7 Crimson Tide lead. On Alabama's next possession, Trent Richardson caught a screen pass from McCarron and ran it 61-yards for a touchdown and extended the Alabama lead to 31–7. The Razorbacks scored on the following possession when Wilson threw his second touchdown pass of the afternoon after he connected on a 19-yard pass to Cobi Hamilton. Eddie Lacy then scored the final points of the game late in the third on a four-yard touchdown run to give the Crimson Tide the 38–14 victory. The Alabama defense only allowed 17 rushing and 226 of total offense to the Razorbacks in the victory. For his 235 all-purpose yards and touchdown reception, Trent Richardson was named the SEC Offensive Player of the Week. The victory improved Alabama's all-time record against the Razorbacks to 12–8 (15–7 without NCAA vacations and forfeits).

=== Florida ===
Team	1	2	3	4	Total
• #3 Alabama	10	14	0	14	38
#12 Florida	10	0	0	0	10

- Location: Gainesville, Florida
- Game start: 8:00 p.m.
- Elapsed time: 3:21
- Game attendance: 90,888
- Game weather: 72°, clear
- Referee: Marc Curles
- TV announcers (CBS): Verne Lundquist (play-by-play), Gary Danielson (color), Tracy Wolfson (sideline)

Scoring summary
1	14:41	Florida	Andre Debose 65-yard pass from John Brantley (Caleb Sturgis kick)	Florida 7–0
1	9:47	Alabama	Jeremy Shelley 32-yard field goal	Florida 7–3
1	5:19	Florida	Caleb Sturgis 21-yard field goal	Florida 10–3
1	0:52	Alabama	Trent Richardson 5-yard run (Jeremy Shelley kick)	10–10
2	12:57	Alabama	Courtney Upshaw 45-yard interception return (Jeremy Shelley kick)	Alabama 17–10
2	3:13	Alabama	A. J. McCarron 1-yard run (Jeremy Shelley kick)	Alabama 24–10
4	12:25	Alabama	Trent Richardson 35-yard run (Jeremy Shelley kick)	Alabama 31–10
4	8:45	Alabama	Eddie Lacy 20-yard run	Alabama 38–10

In what was the first meeting as opposing head coaches between Nick Saban and his former assistant coach from both LSU and the Miami Dolphins, Will Muschamp, the Crimson Tide defeated the Florida Gators, 38–10 at The Swamp. After receiving the opening kickoff, Florida scored their only touchdown of the game on their first offensive play from scrimmage. The Gators took an early 7–0 lead when John Brantley threw a 65-yard touchdown pass to Andre Debose. Alabama responded on the following drive with Jeremy Shelley connecting on a 32-yard field goal to cut the Florida lead to 7–3. The Gators responded with what turned out to be their final points of the game when Caleb Sturgis connected on a 21-yard field goal. Alabama's Marquis Maze then returned the ensuing kickoff 70-yards to the Florida 29-yard line and the Crimson Tide tied the game at 10–10 seven plays later on a five-yard Trent Richardson touchdown run.

Alabama extended their lead to 24–10 at halftime with a pair of second-quarter touchdowns. Courtney Upshaw scored a defensive touchdown early in the quarter after he intercepted a Brantley pass and returned it 45-yards for the score. A. J. McCarron scored later in the quarter on a one-yard quarterback sneak to cap a ten-play, 61-yard drive. Late in the quarter, the Gators did have a scoring opportunity by driving to the Alabama 13-yard line. However, the Alabama defense sacked Brantley on consecutive snaps for a loss of 22-yards and knocked Brantley out of the game with an injury. Sturgis then missed a 52-yard field goal attempt and Alabama led 24–10 at the half.

After a scoreless third quarter, a pair of fourth-quarter touchdowns gave Alabama the 38–10 victory. Richardson scored his second touchdown of the game with 12:25 remaining on a 36-yard run and Eddie Lacy scored the final points of the game on a 20-yard run. For the game, Alabama's defense was dominant in only allowing 222 total yards of offense, with the 15 rushing yards being the fewest ever allowed against Florida in their all-time series. Trent Richardson established a new career high for rushing yards in game with his 181 yards on 29 attempts. The victory improved Alabama's all-time record against the Gators to 22–14 (23–14 without the NCAA vacation of the 2005 victory).

=== Vanderbilt ===
Team	1	2	3	4	Total
Vanderbilt	0	0	0	0	0
• #2 Alabama	7	7	13	7	34

- Location: Tuscaloosa, Alabama
- Game start: 6:02 p.m.
- Elapsed time: 2:59
- Game attendance: 101,821
- Game weather: 77°, Sunny
- Referee: Penn Wagers
- TV announcers (ESPNU): Clay Matvick (play-by-play), Brian Griese (color), Allison Williams (sideline)

Scoring summary
1	7:50	Alabama	Brad Smelley 6-yard pass from A. J. McCarron (Jeremy Shelley kick)	Alabama 7–0
2	0:21	Alabama	DeAndrew White 5-yard pass from A. J. McCarron (Jeremy Shelley kick)	Alabama 14–0
3	6:03	Alabama	Trent Richardson 1-yard run (Jeremy Shelley kick)	Alabama 21–0
3	0:52	Alabama	DeAndrew White 39-yard pass from A. J. McCarron (Jeremy Shelley kick failed)	Alabama 27–0
4	12:16	Alabama	Darius Hanks 17-yard pass from A. J. McCarron (Jeremy Shelley kick)	Alabama 34–0

For the 91st homecoming football game in Alabama history, the Crimson Tide defeated the Vanderbilt Commodores 34–0 who made their first visit to Bryant–Denny Stadium since the 2006 season. After a three-and-out on their opening drive, Alabama scored their first touchdown of the evening on a six-yard A. J. McCarron touchdown pass to Brad Smelley to complete a ten-play, 77-yard drive. On the following drive Vanderbilt had an opportunity to cut into the lead, but Carey Spear missed a 47-yard field goal to keep the Alabama lead at 7–0. Spear missed a second field goal later in the second quarter from 38-yards, and the Crimson Tide responded with their second touchdown drive of the game. McCarron threw his second touchdown pass of the game to DeAndrew White on a five-yard reception to give Alabama a 14–0 halftime lead.

In the third quarter, Trent Richardson scored first on a one-yard touchdown run followed by a 39-yard McCarron touchdown pass to White on consecutive possessions. Following an unsuccessful extra point by Jeremy Shelley, Alabama led 27–0 entering the fourth quarter. Early in the fourth, DeMarcus Milliner intercepted a Jordan Rodgers pass and returned it 37-yards to the Commodores' 20-yard line. Three plays later, McCarron threw a 17-yard touchdown pass, his fourth of the day, to Darius Hanks to make the final score 34–0.

For the game, Trent Richardson ran for 107 yards to extend his streak of consecutive games rushing for at least 100 yards to five games. The defense was dominant in completing their second shutout of the season and only allowing Vanderbilt 190 yards of total offense. The victory improved Alabama's all-time homecoming record to 77–13–1 and their record against the Commodores to 59–19–4 (61–18–4 without the NCAA vacations and forfeits).

=== Ole Miss ===
Team	1	2	3	4	Total
• #2 Alabama	7	10	28	7	52
Ole Miss	7	0	0	0	7

- Location: Oxford, Mississippi
- Game start: 5:00 p.m.
- Elapsed time: 3:03
- Game attendance: 61,792
- Game weather: 75°, fair, calm
- Referee: Marc Curles
- TV announcers (ESPN2): Mark Jones (play-by-play), Ed Cunningham (color), Jeannine Edwards (sideline)

Scoring summary
1	12:38	Ole Miss	Jeff Scott 1-yard run (Bryson Rose kick)	Ole Miss 7–0
1	8:24	Alabama	Trent Richardson 8-yard run (Jeremy Shelley kick)	7–7
2	14:11	Alabama	Trent Richardson 7-yard run (Jeremy Shelley kick)	Alabama 14–7
2	1:14	Alabama	Jeremy Shelley 24-yard field goal	Alabama 17–7
3	12:30	Alabama	Trent Richardson 8-yard run (Jeremy Shelley kick)	Alabama 24–7
3	7:37	Alabama	Trent Richardson 76-yard run (Jeremy Shelley kick)	Alabama 31–7
3	6:44	Alabama	Jalston Fowler 8-yard run (Jeremy Shelley kick)	Alabama 38–7
3	2:08	Alabama	Brandon Gibson 10-yard pass from A. J. McCarron (Jeremy Shelley kick)	Alabama 45–7
4	10:08	Alabama	Jalston Fowler 69-yard run (Jeremy Shelley kick)	Alabama 52–7

After Ole Miss took an early 7–0 lead, the Crimson Tide scored 52 unanswered points in their 52–7 victory over the Rebels at Vaught–Hemingway Stadium. The Rebels scored their only points of the game on their first possession. Jeff Scott scored on a one-yard touchdown run to cap a 5-play, 72-yard drive to give Ole Miss their only lead of the game at 7–0. Alabama responded on the following drive with the first of four Trent Richardson touchdowns of the evening on an eight-yard run to tie the game at 7–7. The Crimson Tide added ten points in the second quarter to take a 17–7 halftime lead. Richardson scored on a seven-yard touchdown and after Cade Foster missed a 53-yard field goal attempt, Jeremy Shelley connected for 24-yard field goal.

In the third quarter, Alabama put the game away with four touchdowns. After five consecutive A. J. McCarron passes gained 65-yards, Richardson gained the final eight en route to his third touchdown of the evening. On the next Alabama possession, Richardson gained 16-yards and then scored a touchdown on a 76-yard run, the longest of his career, for a 31–7 lead. On the first play ensuing Rebels possession, Courtney Upshaw forced a Randall Mackey fumble that was recovered by Ed Stinson at the Ole Miss 15-yard line. Two plays later, the Crimson Tide led 38–7 after Jalston Fowler scored on an eight-yard touchdown run. The final points of the quarter came on a ten-yard McCarron touchdown pass to Brandon Gibson, and the final points of the game came in the fourth quarter on a 69-yard Fowler touchdown run to make the final score 52–7.

Alabama's defense again had a strong performance in only allowing the Rebels 141 total yards of offense (28 rushing, 113 passing). Richardson set a new career high with his 183 rushing yards and four rushing touchdowns. For his performance, Richardson was named the SEC Offensive Player of the Week. The 52 total points were the most Alabama had scored in a SEC game since defeating Vanderbilt 59–28 in 1990. The victory was their eighth straight over Ole Miss and improved Alabama's all-time record against the Rebels 45–9–2 (49–8–2 without NCAA vacations and forfeits).

=== Tennessee ===
Third Saturday in October

Team	1	2	3	4	Total
Tennessee	3	3	0	0	6
• #2 Alabama	3	3	21	10	37

- Location: Tuscaloosa, Alabama
- Game start: 6:21 p.m.
- Elapsed time: 3:03
- Game attendance: 101,821
- Game weather: 63°, Sunny and clear, winds NNE 2 mph
- Referee: Ken Williamson
- TV announcers (ESPN2): Mark Jones (play-by-play), Ed Cunningham (color), Jeannine Edwards (sideline)

Scoring summary
1	3:58	Tennessee	Mike Palardy 40-yard field goal	Tennessee 3–0
1	2:26	Alabama	Jeremy Shelley 26-yard field goal	3–3
2	10:55	Alabama	Jeremy Shelley 29-yard field goal	Alabama 6–3
2	5:52	Tennessee	Mike Palardy 52-yard field goal	6–6
3	11:08	Alabama	A. J. McCarron 2-yard run (Jeremy Shelley kick)	Alabama 13–6
3	8:52	Alabama	Kenny Bell 39-yard pass from A. J. McCarron (Jeremy Shelley kick)	Alabama 20–6
3	3:17	Alabama	Trent Richardson 12-yard run (Jeremy Shelley kick)	Alabama 27–6
4	11:22	Alabama	Cade Foster 45-yard field goal	Alabama 30–6
4	9:27	Alabama	Trent Richardson 1-yard run (Jeremy Shelley kick)	Alabama 37–6

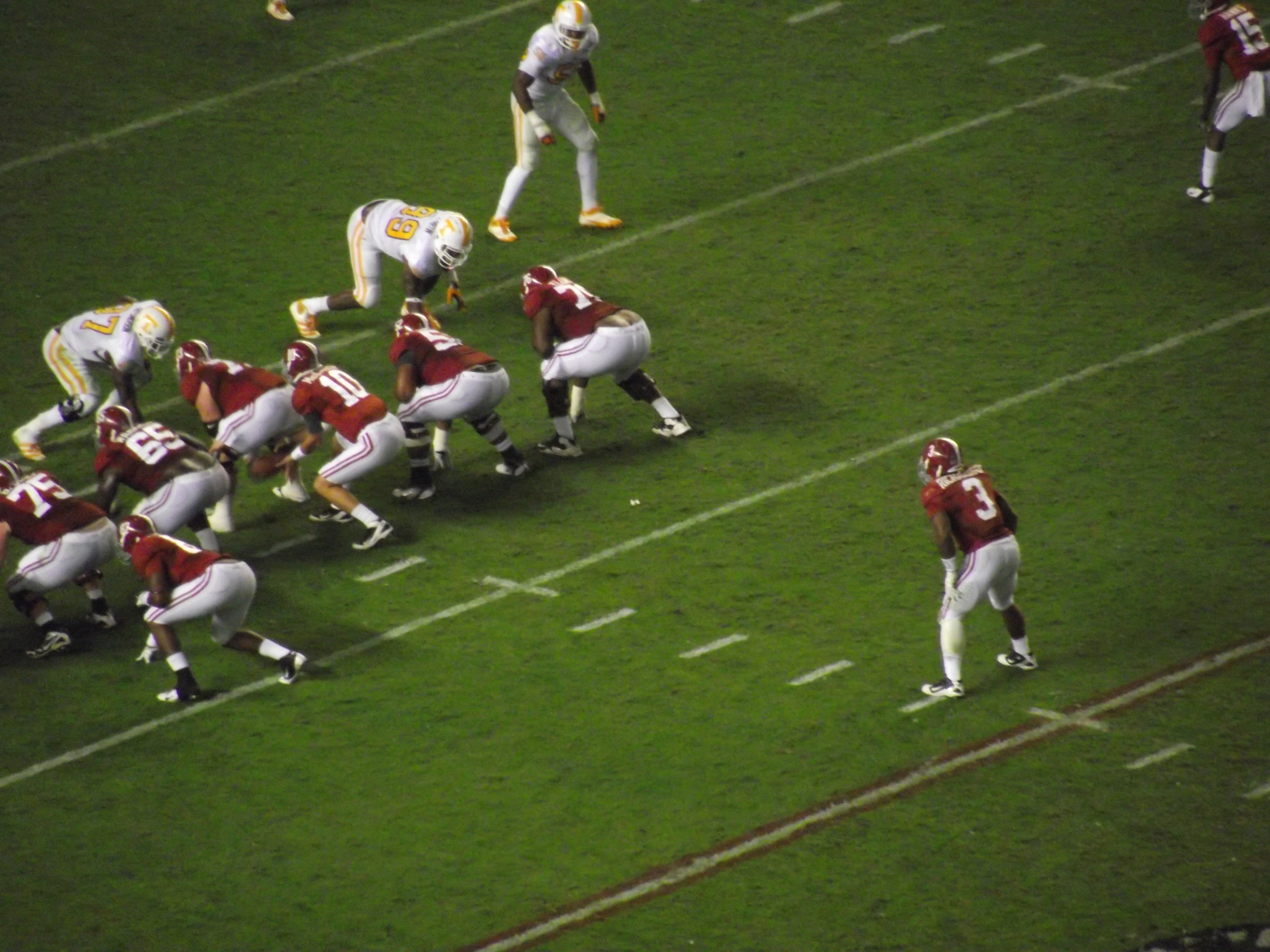
A. J. McCarron takes a snap with Trent Richardson in the backfield against the Tennessee defensive line.

In the 2011 edition of the Third Saturday in October, Alabama entered the game as a 30-point favorite over the rival Tennessee Volunteers. At Bryant–Denny, the Volunteers were looking for the upset after tying the game 6–6 at halftime; however 31 unanswered points resulted in a 37–6 Crimson Tide victory to extend their overall record to 8–0. The first half was dominated by both defenses with each only allowing a pair of field goals. Mike Palardy connected from 40 and 52-yards for Tennessee and Jeremy Shelley connected from 26 and 29-yards for Alabama.

After holding the Volunteers to a three-and-out to open the second half, the Alabama offensive responded with their first of three third-quarter touchdowns with a two-yard A. J. McCarron touchdown run. On the following Tennessee drive, the Alabama defense stopped quarterback Matt Simms on a fourth-and-one to give the Crimson Tide offense the ball on the Volunteers' 39-yard line. On the next play, McCarron threw a 39-yard touchdown pass to Kenny Bell to extend the Alabama lead to 20–6. Trent Richardson then scored his first touchdown of the game on the following Alabama possession on a 12-yard run to cap a six-play, 63-yard drive. Cade Foster scored early in the fourth quarter with his 45-yard field goal, and after a Dont'a Hightower interception, Richardson scored his second touchdown of the day on a one-yard run to make the final score 37–6.

In the game, Marquis Maze had 106 yards receiving on five catches and McCarron set a new career high with 284 yards passing. For his defensive performance, Hightower was named both the Lott IMPACT Player of the Week and the SEC Defensive Player of the Week. The victory was Alabama's fifth consecutive over Tennessee and improved their all-time record against the Volunteers to 48–38–7 (49–37–8 without NCAA vacations and forfeits).

=== LSU ===
Team	1	2	3	4	OT	Total
• #1 LSU	0	3	0	3	3	9
#2 Alabama	0	3	3	0	0	6

- Location: Tuscaloosa, Alabama
- Game start: 7:14 p.m.
- Elapsed time: 3:21
- Game attendance: 101,821
- Game weather: 59°, Wind ESE 3 mph, Clear Skies
- Referee: Tom Ritter
- TV announcers (CBS): Verne Lundquist (play-by-play), Gary Danielson (color), Tracy Wolfson (sideline)

Scoring summary
2	3:53	Alabama	Jeremy Shelley 34-yard field goal	Alabama 3–0
2	0:00	LSU	Drew Alleman 19-yard field goal	3–3
3	7:56	Alabama	Cade Foster 46-yard field goal	Alabama 6–3
4	14:13	LSU	Drew Alleman 30-yard field goal	6–6
OT	15:00	LSU	Drew Alleman 25-yard field goal	LSU 9–6

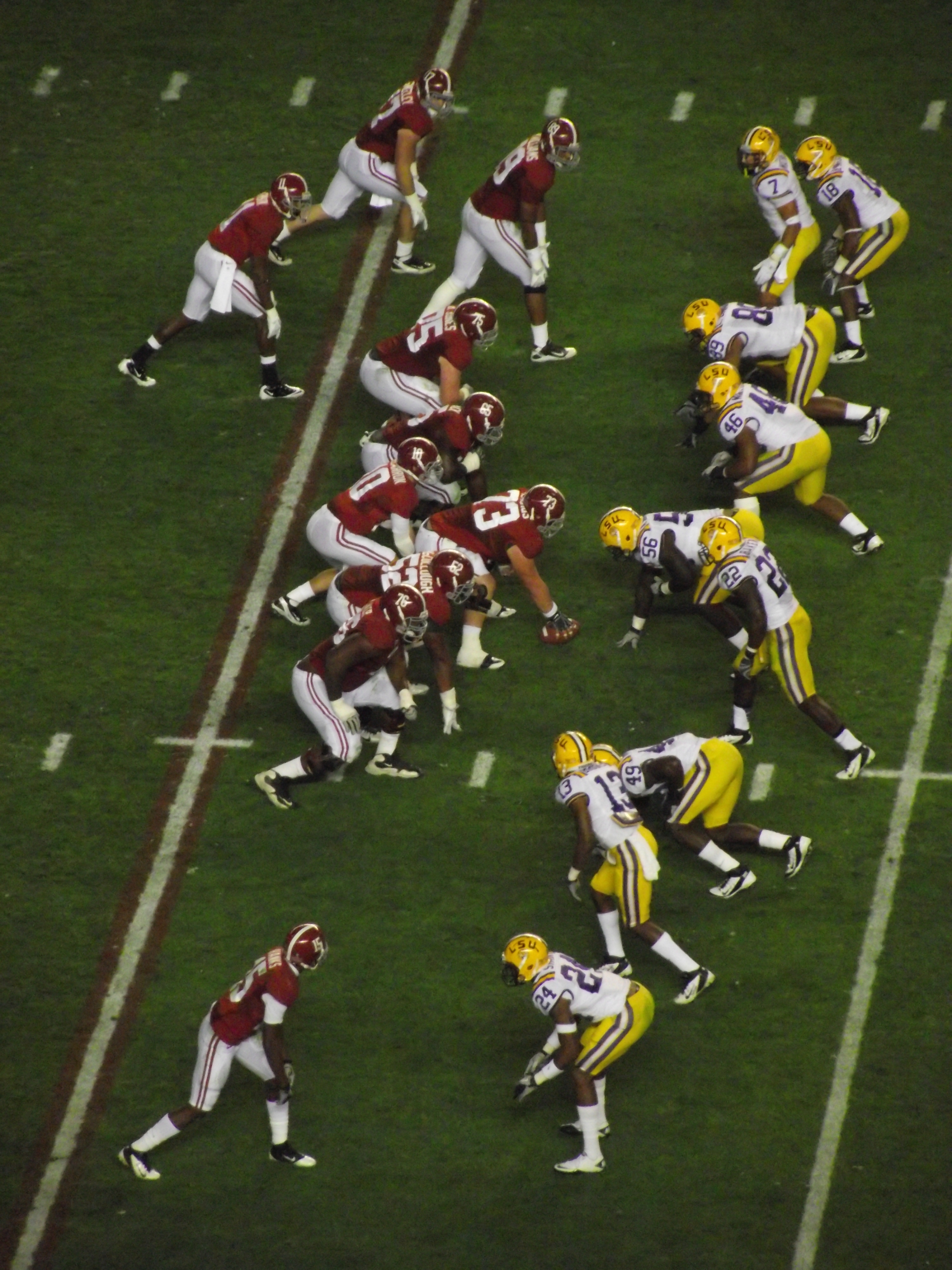
The Alabama offense lines up against the LSU defense.

Coming off their bye and in what was hyped as the latest "Game of the Century" in college football, the LSU Tigers defeated the Crimson Tide 9–6 in overtime. After a scoreless first quarter that saw the Crimson Tide miss two field goals, and another blocked early in the second quarter, Alabama took a 3–0 lead midway through the second on a 34-yard Jeremy Shelley field goal. LSU responded on their following possession by driving to the Alabama two-yard line and kicking a 19-yard Drew Alleman field goal as time expired to tie the game at 3–3 at halftime.

Just as the first half was dominated by both defenses, the second was no different with both Alabama and LSU only managing a pair of field goals. Alabama's came in the third on a 46-yard Cade Foster score and LSU's came in the fourth on a 30-yard Alleman score. In the overtime period, Foster missed a 52-yard field goal attempt and Alleman connected on a 25-yard attempt to give the Tigers the 9–6 victory. Both defenses held each offense to less than 300 yards of total offense with each having a pair of interceptions. With the loss, Alabama dropped to 4–8 all-time in overtime games and brought Alabama's all-time record against the Tigers to 45–25–5.

=== Mississippi State ===
Team	1	2	3	4	Total
• #4 Alabama	0	7	3	14	24
Mississippi State	0	0	0	7	7

- Location: Starkville, Mississippi
- Game start: 6:45 p.m.
- Elapsed time: 3:06
- Game attendance: 57,871
- Game weather: 63°, partly cloudy, windy
- Referee: Hubert Owens
- TV announcers (ESPN): Brad Nessler (play-by-play), Todd Blackledge (color), Holly Rowe (sideline)

Scoring summary
2	9:59	Alabama	Eddie Lacy 2-yard run (Jeremy Shelley kick)	Alabama 7–0
3	7:32	Alabama	Jeremy Shelley 24-yard field goal	Alabama 10–0
4	13:39	Alabama	Trent Richardson 2-yard run (Jeremy Shelley kick)	Alabama 17–0
4	12:03	Miss State	Chris Smith 12-yard pass from Tyler Russell (Derek DePasquale kick)	Alabama 17–7
4	1:18	Alabama	Eddie Lacy 32-yard run (Jeremy Shelley kick)	Alabama 24–7

A week after their loss to LSU, Alabama traveled to Starkville and defeated their long-time rival, the Mississippi State Bulldogs 24–7. After a pair of missed field goals, one from 19-yard by Cade Foster and the second from 31-yards by Jeremy Shelley, Alabama scored their first points in the second quarter. Eddie Lacy capped a five-play, 52-yard drive with a two-yard touchdown run to give the Crimson Tide a 7–0 lead. Later in the quarter Derek DePasquale missed a 41-yard field goal attempt for the Bulldogs, but on the ensuing Alabama possession Cameron Lawrence intercepted an A. J. McCarron pass and returned it to the Alabama four-yard line. However, the Alabama defense held the Bulldogs to only a field goal attempt which was then missed from 29-yards by Brian Egan to preserve a 7–0 halftime lead for the Crimson Tide.

Alabama extended their lead to 10–0 after Shelley connected on a 24-yard field goal early in the third quarter. Early in the fourth, Trent Richardson scored on a two-yard run for a 17–0 Crimson Tide lead. However, on the ensuing kickoff was returned 68-yards to the Alabama 22-yard line by John Fulton, and four plays later the Bulldogs cut the score to 17–7 after Tyler Russell threw a 12-yard touchdown pass to Chris Smith. The Crimson Tide then closed the game with an eleven-play, 73-yard drive, all on the ground, with Lacy scoring his second touchdown of the night from 32 yards out to give Alabama the 24–7 victory. The 127 rushing yards gained by Richardson was his seventh 100-yard rushing game of the season. The victory improved Alabama's all-time record against the Bulldogs to 74–18–3 (76–17–3 without NCAA vacations and forfeits).

=== Georgia Southern ===
Team	1	2	3	4	Total
Georgia Southern	0	14	7	0	21
• #3 Alabama	10	14	14	7	45

- Location: Tuscaloosa, Alabama
- Game start: 1:07 p.m.
- Elapsed time: 2:55
- Game attendance: 101,821
- Game weather: 63°, mostly cloudy, winds SSE 11 mph
- Referee: Matt Moore
- TV announcers (CTSN): Chris Stewart (play-by-play), Tyler Watts (color), Tom Roberts (sideline)

Scoring summary
1	11:48	Alabama	Jeremy Shelley 32-yard field goal	Alabama 3–0
1	5:12	Alabama	Dre Kirkpatrick 55-yard blocked field goal return (Jeremy Shelley kick)	Alabama 10–0
2	12:56	Alabama	Trent Richardson 4-yard pass from A. J. McCarron (Jeremy Shelley kick)	Alabama 17–0
2	12:36	GA Southern	Dominique Swope 89-yard run (Adrian Mora kick)	Alabama 17–7
2	6:16	Alabama	Trent Richardson 1-yard run (Jeremy Shelley kick)	Alabama 24–7
2	0:56	GA Southern	Jonathan Bryant 39-yard pass from Jaybo Shaw (Adrian Mora kick)	Alabama 24–14
3	7:17	Alabama	Brad Smelley 34-yard pass from A. J. McCarron (Jeremy Shelley kick)	Alabama 31–14
3	7:03	GA Southern	Laron Scott 95-yard kickoff return (Adrian Mora kick)	Alabama 31–21
3	2:36	Alabama	Trent Richardson 1-yard run (Jeremy Shelley kick)	Alabama 38–21
4	0:44	Alabama	Brad Smelley 4-yard pass from A. J. McCarron (Jeremy Shelley kick)	Alabama 45–21

Against the triple option attack of the Georgia Southern Eagles, ranked No. 3 in the Football Championship Subdivision (FCS), the Alabama defense gave up the most total yards, rushing yards and points of the season in their 45–21 victory at Bryant–Denny Stadium. After receiving the opening kickoff, the Crimson Tide drove to the Eagles' 14-yard line where Jeremy Shelley connected on a 32-yard field goal for a 3–0 lead. On their opening possession, Georgia Southern had a nine-play, 49-yard drive to set up a 42-yard field goal attempt. However, the Adrian Mora attempt was blocked by Dont'a Hightower and returned by Dre Kirkpatrick 55-yards for a touchdown and a 10–0 Crimson Tide lead. In the second quarter, A. J. McCarron threw a four-yard touchdown pass to Trent Richardson to complete a ten-play, 71-yard drive for a 17–0 lead. However, the Eagles responded on their next offensive play when Dominique Swope scored on an 82-yard touchdown run to cut the Alabama lead to 17–7. Both teams then traded touchdowns when Richardson scored on a one-yard run for Alabama and Jaybo Shaw threw a 39-yard touchdown pass to Jonathan Bryant for Georgia Southern. After Cade Foster missed a 47-yard field goal attempt late, Alabama led 24–14 at halftime.

After forcing a punt to open the second half, Alabama scored a touchdown on its opening possession with a 34-yard touchdown reception by Brad Smelley from McCarron. However, on the ensuing kickoff, Laron Scott returned it 95-yards for a touchdown to cut the lead again to 31–21. Alabama responded on the following drive with Richardson accounting for 46 yards of it on seven carries with a one-yard touchdown run for a 38–21 Alabama lead. In the fourth quarter, Alabama stopped the Eagles at the Crimson Tide eight-yard line after an incomplete Shaw pass on fourth down. From there the Alabama offense began a 15-play, 92-yard drive that took 8:36 to complete with McCarron throwing a four-yard touchdown pass to Smelley for the final points in their 45–21 win. For the game, Richardson had 175 yards on the ground with a pair of rushing touchdowns and one receiving. His one-yard touchdown run in the third quarter gave Richardson the Alabama single-season rushing touchdown record breaking the previous mark of 19 set by Shaun Alexander in 1999.

=== Auburn ===
Iron Bowl

Team	1	2	3	4	Total
• #2 Alabama	14	10	3	15	42
Auburn	7	0	7	0	14

- Location: Auburn, Alabama
- Game start: 2:39 p.m.
- Elapsed time: 3:14
- Game attendance: 87,451
- Game weather: 70°, partly cloudy, winds SE 10 mph
- Referee: Matt Austin
- TV announcers (CBS): Verne Lundquist (play-by-play), Gary Danielson (color), Tracy Wolfson (sideline)

Scoring summary
1	6:33	Alabama	Kenny Bell 41-yard pass from A. J. McCarron (Jeremy Shelley kick)	Alabama 7–0
1	4:25	Alabama	Brad Smelley 35-yard pass from A. J. McCarron (Jeremy Shelley kick)	Alabama 14–0
1	0:04	Auburn	Kenneth Carter recovered fumble in end zone (Cody Parkey kick)	Alabama 14–7
2	9:11	Alabama	Trent Richardson 5-yard run (Jeremy Shelley kick)	Alabama 21–7
2	1:44	Alabama	Jeremy Shelley 30-yard field goal	Alabama 24–7
3	14:49	Auburn	Ontario McCalebb 83-yard kickoff return (Cody Parkey kick)	Alabama 24–14
3	8:47	Alabama	Jeremy Shelley 28-yard field goal	Alabama 27–14
4	14:38	Alabama	Dee Milliner 35-yard interception return (A. J. McCarron to Michael Williams pass)	Alabama 35–14
4	6:40	Alabama	Jalston Fowler 15-yard run (Jeremy Shelley kick)	Alabama 42–14

After the loss against the Auburn Tigers the previous year, in which the Crimson Tide surrendered a 24-point lead, for nearly a year reminders of the defeat and the phrase "never again" were utilized by the team as even greater motivation to win in an already heated rivalry. With a potential berth in the 2012 BCS National Championship Game on the line, the Alabama defense did not allow an offensive touchdown in their 42–14 victory on The Plains. After trading a pair of three-and-outs to open the game, Alabama scored their first points of the game when A. J. McCarron threw a 41-yard touchdown pass to Kenny Bell for a 7–0 lead. Following a ten-yard Steven Clark punt on the ensuing Auburn possession, Alabama got the ball on the Tigers' 35-yard line. On the next play, McCarron threw a 35-yard touchdown pass to Brad Smelley for a 14–0 lead. On the first play of Alabama's fourth offensive possession, Corey Lemonier forced a McCarron fumble that was recovered for a touchdown by Kenneth Carter to cut the Crimson Tide lead to 14–7 at the end of the first quarter. A pair of long drives in the second quarter resulted in a five-yard Trent Richardson touchdown reception and a 30-yard Jeremy Shelley field goal to give Alabama a 24–7 halftime lead.

On the opening kickoff of the second half, Onterio McCalebb scored a touchdown on an 83-yard return to cut the Alabama lead to 24–14. Alabama responded on their next possession with a 28-yard Shelley field goal for a 27–14 lead entering the fourth quarter. On the third play of the fourth quarter, Auburn's Clint Moseley threw an interception to DeMarcus Milliner that was returned 35-yards for a touchdown and after a successful two-point conversion, Alabama led 35–14. After getting the ball back on downs late in the quarter, Jalston Fowler scored on a 15-yard touchdown run, to cap a drive that included a 57-yard Richardson run, and made the final score 42–14.

In the game, Richardson set a new career high with his 203 rushing yards and tied Mark Ingram II for the most 100-yard rushing games in a season with nine. The defense held Auburn to 140 total yards of offense, with only 78 yards on the ground, and zero offensive touchdowns in the victory. The victory brought Alabama's all-time record against the Tigers to 41–34–1.

=== LSU ===
Allstate BCS National Championship

Team	1	2	3	4	Total
• #2 Alabama	3	6	6	6	21
#1 LSU	0	0	0	0	0

- Location: New Orleans, Louisiana
- Game start: 7:30 p.m.
- Elapsed time: 3:01
- Game attendance: 78,237
- Game weather: Indoors
- Referee: Scott Novak
- TV announcers (ESPN): Brent Musburger (play-by-play), Kirk Herbstreit (color), Erin Andrews and Tom Rinaldi (sideline)

Scoring summary
1	5:00	Alabama	Jeremy Shelley 23-yard field goal	Alabama 3–0
2	4:18	Alabama	Jeremy Shelley 34-yard field goal	Alabama 6–0
2	0:00	Alabama	Jeremy Shelley 41-yard field goal	Alabama 9–0
3	12:49	Alabama	Jeremy Shelley 35-yard field goal	Alabama 12–0
3	0:22	Alabama	Jeremy Shelley 44-yard field goal	Alabama 15–0
4	4:36	Alabama	Trent Richardson 34-yard run (Jeremy Shelley kick failed)	Alabama 21–0

On December 4, 2011, the final Bowl Championship Series standings were unveiled with a rematch between No. 1 LSU and No. 2 Alabama in the BCS National Championship Game. In the game, the Crimson Tide defeated the Tigers 21–0 to clinch their second BCS Championship in three years. The first points of the game were set up after Marquis Maze returned a Brad Wing punt 49-yards to the LSU 26-yard line in the first quarter. Five plays later, Jeremy Shelley connected on a 23-yard field goal to give Alabama a 3–0 lead. After his first attempt was blocked by the Tigers' Michael Brockers, Shelley connected on second-quarter field goals of 34 and 41 yards to give the Crimson Tide a 9–0 halftime lead.

Shelley extended the Crimson Tide lead to 12–0 after he converted a 35-yard field goal on Alabama's first possession of the second half. He then missed a 41-yard field goal attempt wide right before he connected on a 44-yard attempt to give the Crimson Tide a 15–0 lead at the end of the third quarter. Midway through the fourth quarter, the LSU offense crossed the 50-yard line for the first time of the game only to be pushed back to the 50 after Dont'a Hightower sacked Jordan Jefferson on a fourth down play to give possession back to Alabama. On that possession, the Crimson Tide scored the only touchdown of the game on a 34-yard Trent Richardson run to make the final score 21–0.

In the game, Alabama outgained LSU in total offense 384 to 92 yards, and the shutout was the first ever completed in a BCS game since the advent of the BCS in 1998. Jeremy Shelley established the all-time bowl record with seven field goal attempts and tied the all-time bowl record with five made. For their performances, Courtney Upshaw was named the defensive player of the game and A. J. McCarron was named the offensive player of the game.

McCarron became the first sophomore quarterback to lead a team to a BCS National Title.

== Rankings ==
Entering the 2011 season, the Crimson Tide was ranked No. 2 in the AP and Coaches' Preseason Polls. Alabama dropped no further than to No. 3 in any of the rankings through week nine when they were ranked No. 2 for their November 5 game against LSU. After their 9–6 loss against the Tigers, Alabama dropped to No. 4 in all but the BCS standing where they dropped to No. 3. The Crimson Tide regained their No. 2 ranking in all of the polls after Oklahoma State was upset by Iowa State, and retained the No. 2 position through the end of the regular season to qualify for the BCS National Championship Game. After their victory over LSU in the BCS National Championship Game, Alabama was selected No. 1 in both the AP and Coaches' Polls.

Ranking movements Legend: ██ Increase in ranking ██ Decrease in ranking
	Week															
Poll	Pre	1	2	3	4	5	6	7	8	9	10	11	12	13	14	Final
AP	2	3	2	3	3	2	2	2	2	2	4	3	2	2	2	1
Coaches	2	2	2	2	2	3	3	3	2	2	4	3	2	2	2	1
Harris	Not released						2	2	2	2	4	3	2	2	2	Not released
BCS	Not released							2	2	2	3	3	2	2	2	Not released

*Source: ESPN.com: 2011 NCAA Football Rankings

== After the season ==
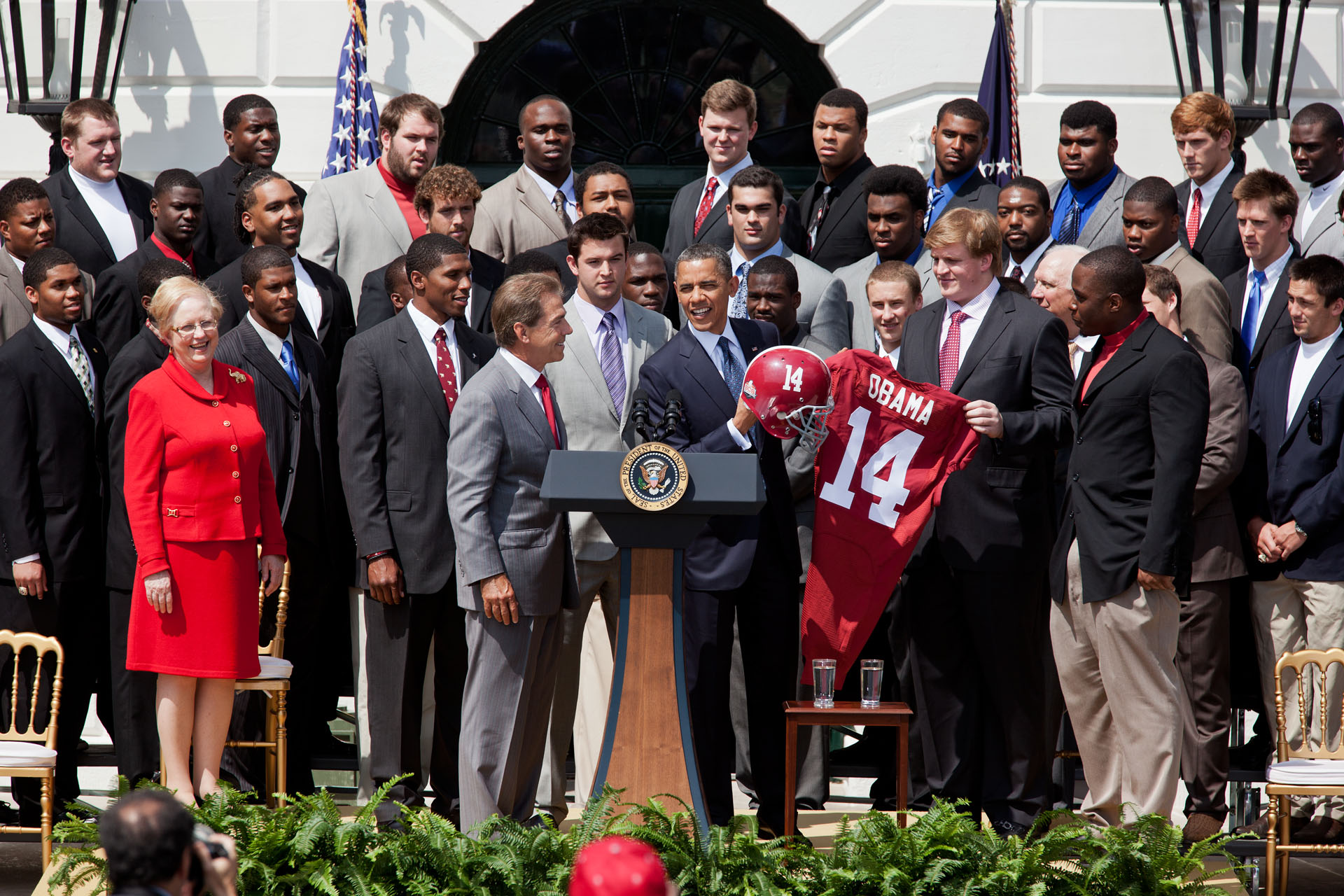
The Crimson Tide meet with President Barack Obama after winning the national championship on April 19, 2012.

Following the victory against LSU for the national championship, the team arrived at the Tuscaloosa Regional Airport on the afternoon of January 10. Several hundred fans were there to greet them upon their arrival. On January 21, a public national championship celebration at Bryant–Denny Stadium was attended by approximately 32,000 spectators. Speakers at the event included head coach Nick Saban and university president Robert Witt. All of the championship trophies were available for public viewing.

As part of the A-Day celebrations on April 14, the 2011 team captains Trent Richardson, Dont'a Hightower and Mark Barron were honored at the Walk of Fame ceremony at the base of Denny Chimes. On April 19, the team made their trip to the White House, where President Barack Obama offered congratulatory remarks for their championship season and recognized the team for their community service given in Tuscaloosa after the April 2011 tornadoes.

=== Final statistics ===
After their victory over LSU in the BCS National Championship Game, Alabama's final team statistics were released. On the defensive side of the ball, of the 120 FBS teams, the Crimson Tide was ranked at the top of all major defensive categories in conference and nationally. They ranked first in total defense (183.62 yards per game), scoring defense (8.15 points per game), passing defense (111.46 yards per game) and rushing defense (72.15 yards per game). It marked the first time that a single defense ranked first in all four major, team defensive categories since the 1986 Oklahoma squad. Individually, Dont'a Hightower led the team with 85 total tackles, 45 of which were assisted, and Mark Barron was the leader with 43 solo tackles. Courtney Upshaw was tied for sixteenth nationally, fourth in conference and first on the team with 9.5 quarterback sacks. Upshaw was also eighteenth nationally, second in conference and first on the team with 18 tackles for loss. DeMarcus Milliner led the team with three of Alabama's thirteen total interceptions of the season.

On offense, of the 120 FBS teams, Alabama ranked sixteenth in rushing offense (214.46 yards per game), twentieth in scoring offense (34.85 points per game), 31st in total offense (429.62 yards per game) and 69th in passing offense (215.15 yards per game). In conference, they ranked first in rushing offense, second in total offense, third in scoring offense and fourth in passing offense. Individually, Trent Richardson led the SEC and the team offensively with 1,679 total yards rushing, an average of 129.15 rushing yards per game, an average of 160.23 all-purpose yards per game, 21 rushing touchdowns and an average of 11.08 points per game. A. J. McCarron led the team in passing offense and completed 219 of 328 passes for 2,634 passing yards and 16 touchdowns. Marquis Maze led the team with 56 receptions for 627 yards, and Brad Smelley led the team with four touchdown receptions.

=== Awards ===
Following the SEC Championship Game, multiple Alabama players were recognized for their on-field performances with a variety of awards and recognitions. At the team awards banquet on December 4, Mark Barron, Dont'a Hightower and Trent Richardson were each named the permanent captains of the 2011 squad. At that time Richardson was also named the 2011 most valuable player with Barron, Hightower and Courtney Upshaw named defensive players of the year and A. J. McCarron and Marquis Maze named the offensive players of the year.

==== Conference ====
The SEC recognized several players for their individual performances with various awards. Trent Richardson was named the AP Offensive Player of the Year. In addition to Richardson, Mark Barron, Barrett Jones, Courtney Upshaw and William Vlachos were named to the AP All-SEC First Team. Josh Chapman, Dont'a Hightower and Dre Kirkpatrick were named to the AP All-SEC Second Team. Barron, Hightower, Jones, Richardson, Upshaw and Vlachos were named to the Coaches' All-SEC First Team. Chapman, Kirkpatrick, Marquis Maze (as both a wide receiver and return specialist) and Chance Warmack were named to the Coaches' All-SEC Second Team. Cyrus Kouandjio and Vinnie Sunseri were both named to Freshman All-SEC Team. The SEC named Richardson the Offensive Player of the Year. Jones earned the Jacobs Blocking Trophy and was also named the SEC Scholar-Athlete of the Year.

==== National ====
After the season, a number of Alabama players were named as national award winners and finalists. Trent Richardson was named a finalist to win the Heisman Trophy, along with Wisconsin's Montee Ball, Baylor's Robert Griffin III, Stanford's Andrew Luck and LSU's Tyrann Mathieu. He finished third in the Heisman voting with 978 points, behind Griffin (1,687 points) and Luck (1,407 points). Richardson won the Doak Walker Award and was also named a finalist for the Maxwell Award; Dont'a Hightower was named a finalist for the Chuck Bednarik Award, the Butkus Award, the Lott Trophy and the Lombardi Award; Courtney Upshaw was named a finalist for the Butkus Award and the Lombardi Award; Barrett Jones won the Outland Trophy, the Wuerffel Trophy and the ARA Sportsmanship Award; Mark Barron was named a finalist for the Jim Thorpe Award and the Bronko Nagurski Trophy; and William Vlachos was named a finalist for the Rimington Trophy. Assistant head and linebackers coach Sal Sunseri was also named a finalist for the Frank Broyles Award. The team as a whole was honored with the Disney's Wide World of Sports Spirit Award as a result of their collective efforts to assist in the rebuilding of Tuscaloosa following the April 27, 2011, tornado.

In addition to the individual awards, several players were also named to various national All-American Teams. Barron, Hightower, Jones, DeQuan Menzie and Richardson were named to the American Football Coaches Association (AFCA) All-America Team. Barron, Hightower, Jones and Richardson were named to the Walter Camp All-America Team. Upshaw and Vlachos were both named to the Walter Camp All-America Second Team. Barron, Dre Kirkpatrick, Jones, Richardson and Upshaw were named to the Football Writers Association of America (FWAA) All-America Team. Barron, Hightower, Jones and Richardson were named to the Associated Press All-American First Team; Upshaw and Kirkpatrick were named to the Associated Press All-American Second Team. Barron, Jones, Richardson and Upshaw were named to the Sporting News (TSN) All-America Team. Of the seven Alabama players selected, Barron, Jones and Richardson were each recognized as unanimous All-American selections, and Hightower was recognized as a consensus All-American selection.

==== All-star games ====
Several Alabama players were selected by postseason all-star games. Mark Barron, Josh Chapman, Marquis Maze, DeQuan Menzie, Courtney Upshaw and William Vlachos were selected to play in the Merrill Lynch Senior Bowl. On January 17, Brad Smelley became the seventh member of Alabama's team to receive an invitation to the Senior Bowl. Darius Hanks was selected to play in the East–West Shrine Game. Alabama did not have players participate in the Casino del Sol College All-Star Game or the NFLPA Collegiate Bowl.

=== Coaching changes ===
In the weeks following the conclusion of the season, several changes were made to the Alabama coaching staff. On December 13 offensive coordinator Jim McElwain was introduced as the head coach with the Colorado State Rams. He stayed with Alabama through the BCS National Championship Game and began his transition as the Rams' head coach from Tuscaloosa. On January 13, assistant head and linebackers coach Sal Sunseri was named as the defensive coordinator with the Tennessee Volunteers. On January 18, 2012, Alabama officials announced the hires of both Doug Nussmeier from the Washington Huskies as offensive coordinator and of Lance Thompson from Tennessee as outside linebackers coach.

=== NFL draft ===
Of all the draft-eligible juniors, Dont'a Hightower, Dre Kirkpatrick and Trent Richardson declared their eligibility for the 2012 NFL draft on January 12. At the time of their announcement, each was projected as a first round pick. In February 2012, nine Alabama players, six seniors and three juniors, were invited to the NFL Scouting Combine. The invited players were safety Mark Barron, defensive tackle Josh Chapman, wide receivers Darius Hanks and Marquis Maze, linebackers Dont'a Hightower and Courtney Upshaw, cornerbacks Dre Kirkpatrick and DeQuan Menzie, and running back Trent Richardson. Mark Barron, Dont'a Hightower, Dre Kirkpatrick, Trent Richardson and Courtney Upshaw were each invited to attend the Draft at Radio City Music Hall. In the draft, Alabama tied a school record with four players selected in the first round. The first round selections were Richardson (3rd Cleveland Browns), Barron (7th Tampa Bay Buccaneers), Kirkpatrick (17th Cincinnati Bengals) and Hightower (25th New England Patriots). Upshaw was the third player selected in the second round (35th Baltimore Ravens). Chapman was the first player selected in the fifth round (136th Indianapolis Colts) and Menzie was the eleventh player selected in the fifth round (146th Kansas City Chiefs). Brad Smelley was the eighth and final Alabama player selected in the 2012 Draft in the seventh round (247th Cleveland Browns). In the days after the draft, six players from the 2011 squad that were not drafted signed as undrafted free agents. These players included Alfred McCullough (Baltimore Ravens), Marquis Maze (Pittsburgh Steelers), Alex Watkins (Tennessee Titans), Jerrell Harris (Atlanta Falcons), William Vlachos (Tennessee Titans) and Darius Hanks (Washington Redskins).
