= William Vlachos =

American football player and coach (born 1988)

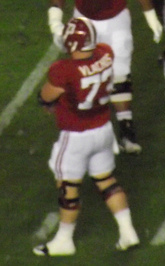

Colorado State Rams
- Title: Senior defensive analyst

Personal information
- Born: May 26, 1988 (age 38); Athens, Greece
- Listed height: 6 ft 1 in (1.85 m)
- Listed weight: 294 lb (133 kg)

Career information
- High school: Birmingham (AL) Mountain Brook
- College: Alabama
- NFL draft: 2012: undrafted

Career history

Playing
- Tennessee Titans (2012)*
- * Offseason or practice squad member only

Coaching
- Alabama (2013) Graduate assistant; Alabama (2014–2017) Analyst; Buffalo Bills (2018) Coaching assistant; Colorado (2020) Defensive blitz & offensive front specialist; Colorado (2021) Offensive line; Central Michigan (2022) Offensive line; Western Kentucky (2023) Defensive run game & pass rush coordinator; Ole Miss (2024) Defensive analyst; Miami (FL) (2025) Assistant offensive line; Colorado State (2026–present) Senior defensive analyst

Awards and highlights
- As a player: 2× BCS national champion (2010, 2012); Second-team All-American (2011); First-team All-SEC (2011); Second-team All-SEC (2010); Second-team Alabama Crimson Tide all decade team (2010–2019); As a coach: 2× CFP national champion (2015, 2017)

William Constantinos Vlachos (born May 26, 1988) is an American football coach and former player who is currently a senior defensive analyst at Colorado State University under head coach Jim L. Mora. He played college football at the University of Alabama.

== Early life ==
Vlachos attended Mountain Brook High School in Mountain Brook, Alabama. Originally a guard, Vlachos was a three-star prospect out of high school, ranked 19th nationally by Rivals.com, 16th in the state of Alabama by Scout.com and 15th in Alabama by the Mobile Press-Register. As a senior, he was recognized on the 6A All-State team.

== College career ==
A five-year player at Alabama, Vlachos was originally recruited by Mike Shula, not Nick Saban, as Saban replaced Shula before the 2007 season.

In his initial year at Alabama, Vlachos played in one game and was subsequently redshirted. In his second year, he saw limited action in seven games, including the 2008 Allstate Sugar Bowl.

As a redshirt sophomore in 2009, Vlachos started every game, helping pave the way for eventual Heisman Trophy winner Mark Ingram II to rush for 1658 yards and 17 touchdowns, and helped Greg McElroy throw for 2,508 yards and 17 touchdowns, en route an SEC Championship and a BCS National Championship. As a redshirt junior, Vlachos again started every game en route to a 49–7 victory over Michigan State in the 2011 Capital One Bowl. As a redshirt senior in 2011, Vlachos again paved the way for another prolific running back, this time Trent Richardson, who rushed for 23 touchdowns and finished as a Heisman Trophy candidate. Vlachos and Alabama would win another BCS National Championship.

Vlachos finished his career having started 40 consecutive games and having played in 48 total games.

== Professional career ==
On April 30, 2012, Vlachos was signed as an undrafted free agent by the Tennessee Titans. He was released on August 27, 2012.

== Personal life ==
Vlachos was born in Greece to a Greek father and an American mother.
