= 2011 All-SEC football team =

American college football all-star team

The 2011 All-SEC football team consists of American football players selected to the All-Southeastern Conference (SEC) chosen by the Associated Press (AP) and the conference coaches for the 2011 Southeastern Conference football season.

The LSU Tigers won the conference, beating the Georgia Bulldogs 42 to 10 in the SEC Championship game. The Tigers then lost the national championship to the Alabama Crimson Tide 21 to 0 in the 2012 BCS National Championship Game, a rematch of a regular season game won in overtime by LSU 9 to 6.

Alabama running back Trent Richardson, a unanimous AP Selection, won the Doak Walker Award given to the nation's top running back and was voted AP SEC Offensive Player of the Year. LSU cornerback Tyrann Mathieu, also a unanimous AP selection, won the Bednarik Award as the nation's top defensive player and was voted AP SEC Defensive Player of the Year.

== Offensive selections ==
=== Quarterbacks ===
- Tyler Wilson, Arkansas (AP-1, Coaches-1)
- Aaron Murray, Georgia (AP-2, Coaches-2)

=== Running backs ===
- Trent Richardson*, Alabama (AP-1, Coaches-1)
- Michael Dyer, Auburn (AP-1, Coaches-1)
- Zac Stacy, Vanderbilt (AP-2, Coaches-2)
- Marcus Lattimore, South Carolina (AP-2, Coaches-2)
- Vick Ballard, Miss. St. (AP-2)
- Spencer Ware, LSU (Coaches-2)

=== Wide receivers ===
- Jarius Wright, Arkansas (AP-1, Coaches-1)
- Da'Rick Rogers, Tennessee (AP-1, Coaches-2)
- Rueben Randle, LSU (AP-2, Coaches-1)
- Alshon Jeffery, South Carolina (AP-2)
- Marquis Maze, Alabama (Coaches-2)

=== Centers ===
- William Vlachos, Alabama (AP-1, Coaches-1)
- Ben Jones, Georgia (AP-2, Coaches-2)

=== Guards ===
- Barrett Jones*, Alabama (AP-1, Coaches-1)
- Will Blackwell, LSU (AP-1, Coaches-1)
- Alvin Bailey, Arkansas (AP-2, Coaches-2)
- Larry Warford, Kentucky (AP-2, Coaches-2)
- Gabe Jackson, Miss. St. (AP-2)
- Chance Warmack, Alabama (Coaches-2)

=== Tackles ===
- Cordy Glenn, Georgia (AP-1, Coaches-1)
- Rokevious Watkins, South Carolina (AP-1, Coaches-2)
- Alex Hurst, LSU (Coaches-1)
- Chris Faulk, LSU (AP-2)
- Brandon Mosley, Auburn (Coaches-2)

=== Tight ends ===
- Orson Charles, Georgia (AP-1, Coaches-1)
- Philip Lutzenkirchen, Auburn (AP-2, Coaches-2)

== Defensive selections ==
=== Defensive ends ===
- Melvin Ingram, South Carolina (AP-1, Coaches-1)
- Sam Montgomery, LSU (AP-1, Coaches-1)
- Corey Lemonier, Auburn (AP-2, Coaches-1)
- Jake Bequette, Arkansas (Coaches-1)
- Barkevious Mingo, LSU (AP-2)
- Jadeveon Clowney, South Carolina (Coaches-2)
- Tim Fugger, Vanderbilt (Coaches-2)

=== Defensive tackles ===
- Fletcher Cox, Miss. St. (AP-1, Coaches-2)
- Malik Jackson, Tennessee (AP-1, Coaches-2)
- Josh Chapman, Alabama (AP-2, Coaches-2)
- Michael Brockers, LSU (AP-2)

=== Linebackers ===
- Jarvis Jones*, Georgia (AP-1, Coaches-1)
- Courtney Upshaw, Alabama (AP-1, Coaches-1)
- Danny Trevathan, Kentucky (AP-1, Coaches-2)
- Dont'a Hightower, Alabama (AP-2, Coaches-1)
- Chris Marve, Vanderbilt (AP-2, Coaches-2)
- Jerry Franklin, Arkansas (AP-2, Coaches-2)
- Ryan Baker, LSU (Coaches-2)

=== Cornerbacks ===
- Tyrann Mathieu*, LSU (AP-1, Coaches-1)
- Morris Claiborne, LSU (AP-1, Coaches-1)
- Dre Kirkpatrick, Alabama (AP-2, Coaches-2)
- Casey Hayward, Vanderbilt (AP-2, Coaches-2)
- Johnthan Banks, Miss. St. (AP-2)
- Brandon Boykin, Georgia (Coaches-2)

=== Safeties ===
- Mark Barron, Alabama (AP-1, Coaches-1)
- Bacarri Rambo, Georgia (AP-1, Coaches-1)
- Winston Guy, Kentucky (AP-2, Coaches-2)
- Antonio Allen, South Carolina (AP-2)
- Eric Reid, LSU (AP-2)

== Special teams ==
=== Kickers ===
- Caleb Sturgis, Florida (AP-1, Coaches-1)
- Drew Alleman, LSU (AP-2, Coaches-2)

=== Punters ===
- Brad Wing, LSU (AP-1, Coaches-2)
- Steven Clark, Auburn (Coaches-1)
- Dylan Breeding, Arkansas (AP-2, Coaches-2)

=== All purpose/return specialist ===
- Joe Adams, Arkansas (AP-1, Coaches-1)
- Chris Rainey, Florida (Coaches-1)
- Dennis Johnson, Arkansas (AP-2)
- Onterio McCalebb, Auburn (Coaches-2)
- Marquis Maze, Alabama (Coaches-2)

== Key ==
Bold = Consensus first-team selection by both the coaches and AP

AP = Associated Press

Coaches = Selected by the SEC coaches

* = Unanimous selection of AP

== See also ==
- 2011 Southeastern Conference football season
- 2011 College Football All-America Team
