= Phillip Sims =

Phil(l)ip Sim(m)s may refer to:

- P. Hal Sims (1886–1949), American bridge player
- Phil Simms (born 1954), American football quarterback
- Phillip Sims (American football) (born 1992), American football quarterback
