= Dennis Johnson (running back) =

American football player (born 1990)

No. 28
- Position: Running back

Personal information
- Born: February 24, 1990 (age 36); Texarkana, Arkansas, U.S.
- Listed height: 5 ft 8 in (1.73 m)
- Listed weight: 212 lb (96 kg)

Career information
- College: Arkansas
- NFL draft: 2013: undrafted

Career history
- Houston Texans (2013)*; Cleveland Browns (2013)*; Houston Texans (2013); Brooklyn Bolts (2014)*
- * Offseason or practice squad member only

Awards and highlights
- Second-team All-SEC (2011)

Career NFL statistics
- Rushing attempts: 49
- Rushing yards: 183
- Receptions: 8
- Receiving yards: 46
- Stats at Pro Football Reference

Dennis Johnson (born February 24, 1990) is an American former professional football player who was a running back in the National Football League (NFL). He played college football for the Arkansas Razorbacks. He was signed by the Houston Texans as an undrafted free agent in 2013. He was also a member of the Cleveland Browns and Brooklyn Bolts.

== Professional career ==
=== Houston Texans ===
Johnson was signed by the Houston Texans on April 28, 2013. He was released by the Texans on August 30, 2013.

=== Cleveland Browns ===
Johnson signed with the Cleveland Browns on September 2, 2013. He was released by the Browns on September 7 and re-signed to the Browns' practice squad on September 10, 2013.

=== Houston Texans ===
Johnson was claimed by the Houston Texans off the Browns' practice squad on October 27, 2013. The Texans released Johnson on August 11, 2014.
