= Carson Tinker =

American football player (born 1989)

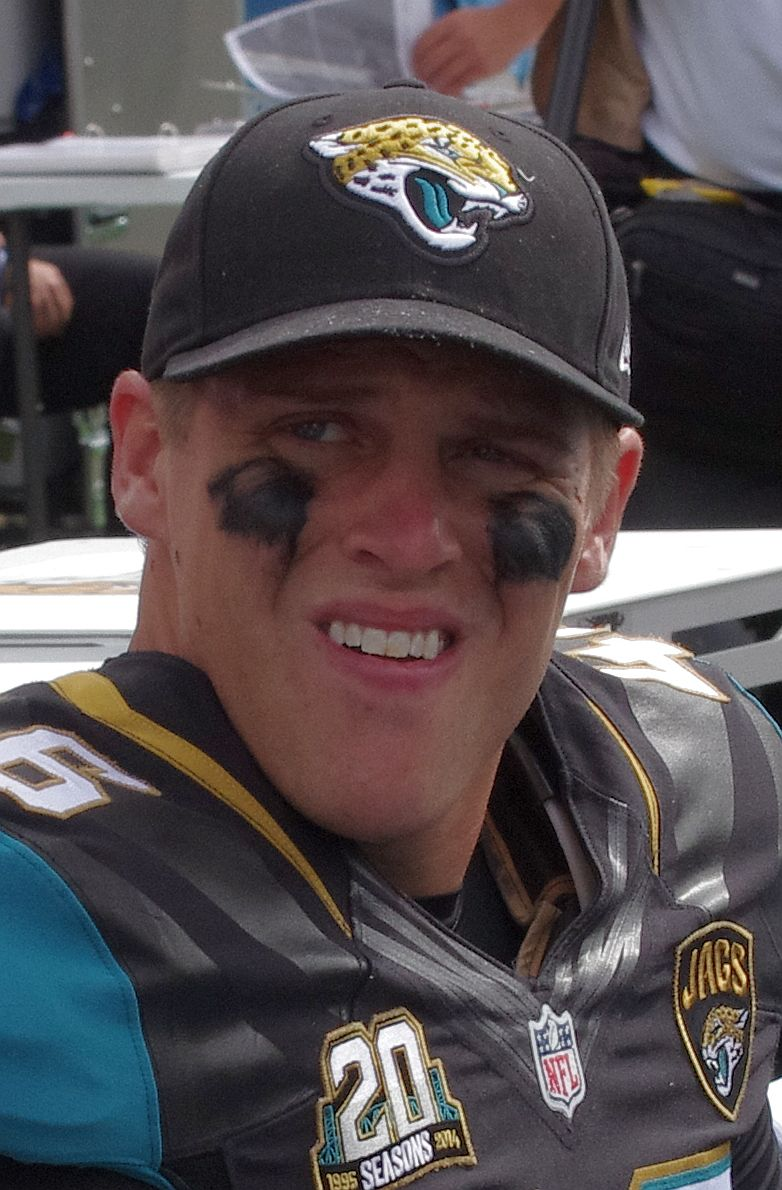
- Tinker with the Jacksonville Jaguars in 2014

Profile
- Position: Long snapper

Personal information
- Born: November 15, 1989 (age 36); Decatur, Alabama, U.S.
- Listed height: 6 ft 0 in (1.83 m)
- Listed weight: 237 lb (108 kg)

Career information
- High school: Riverdale (Murfreesboro, Tennessee)
- College: Alabama (2008–2012)
- NFL draft: 2013: undrafted

Career history
- Jacksonville Jaguars (2013–2018); New York Giants (2020–2021)*; Tampa Bay Buccaneers (2021); Las Vegas Raiders (2021); Los Angeles Rams (2021)*; Seattle Seahawks (2022); Jacksonville Jaguars (2023)*; Los Angeles Rams (2023)
- * Offseason or practice squad member only

Awards and highlights
- Super Bowl champion (LVI); 3× BCS national champion (2009, 2011, 2012)

Career NFL statistics
- Games played: 99
- Total tackles: 18
- Stats at Pro Football Reference

Carson Tinker (born November 15, 1989) is an American former professional football player who was a long snapper in the National Football League (NFL). He played college football for the Alabama Crimson Tide, where was a member of their 2009 national championship team and played as the starting long snapper for both the 2011 and 2012 national championship teams. He was signed by the Jacksonville Jaguars as an undrafted free agent in 2013.

== College career ==
After he was redshirted for the 2008 season, Tinker saw his first action in Alabama's game against Chattanooga during the 2009 season. For the 2010 season, Tinker was elevated as the starting long snapper for the Crimson Tide and converted 121 of 123 snapping opportunities during the season. For the 2011 season, Tinker converted all 119 snapping opportunities en route to the 2011 national championship. Tinker was selected by his teammates to accept the 2011 Disney's Wide World of Sports Spirit Award on December 8, 2011, on behalf of the entire team in recognition for their collective efforts in the rebuilding of Tuscaloosa after the tornado.

For his first four years with the Crimson Tide, Tinker played as a member of the team as a walk-on. Prior to the start of his senior season, Tinker was awarded a full athletic scholarship for the year by Nick Saban in recognition of his accomplishments on and off the field. In 2012, Tinker again served as the starting long snapper and converted 133 of 135 snapping opportunities during the season.

== Professional career ==
=== Pre-draft ===
Pre-draft measurables
Height	Weight	Arm length	Hand span	40-yard dash	10-yard split	20-yard split	Three-cone drill	Vertical jump	Broad jump	Bench press
6 ft 0 1/8 in (1.83 m)	233 lb (106 kg)	31 3/8 in (0.80 m)	9 1/8 in (0.23 m)	5.00 s	1.73 s	2.97 s	8.06 s	26.0 in (0.66 m)	8 ft 1 in (2.46 m)	17 reps
All values from Pro Day

At the end of his senior season at Alabama, Tinker was ranked as the top available long snapper for the 2013 NFL draft.

=== Jacksonville Jaguars (first stint) ===
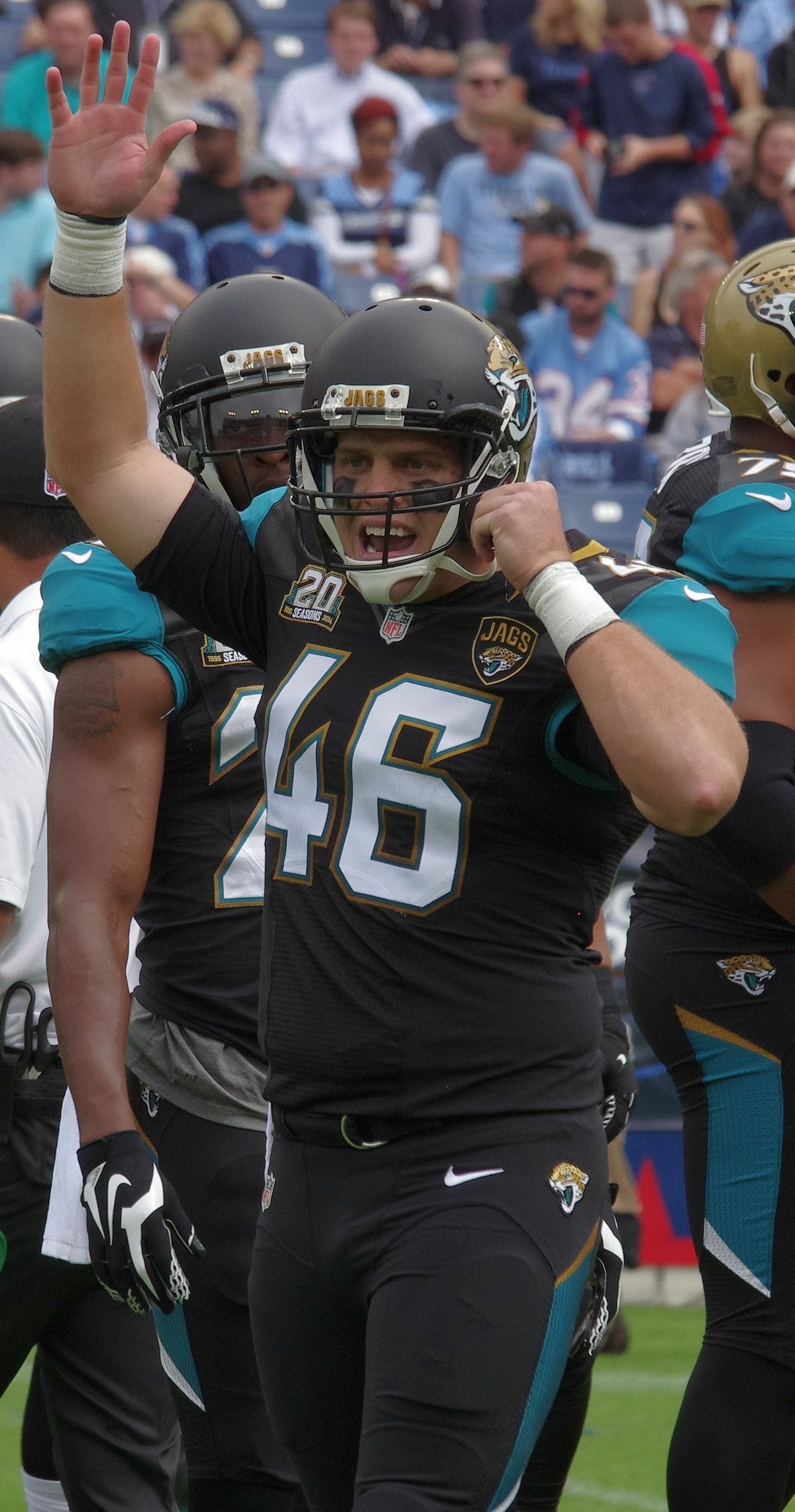
Tinker with the Jaguars in 2014

After going undrafted in the 2013 NFL Draft, Tinker signed with the Jacksonville Jaguars. In training camp, he competed for the starting long snapper position with veteran Jeremy Cain and rookie Luke Ingram. On August 25, Tinker won the starting job after Cain and Ingram were released.

On August 3, 2017, during training camp, Tinker suffered a torn ACL and was placed on injured reserve.

On October 11, 2018, Tinker was placed on injured reserve with an undisclosed knee injury.

On March 8, 2019, the Jaguars released Tinker due to salary cap space issues.

=== New York Giants ===
After sitting out the 2019 NFL season, Tinker was signed by the New York Giants on September 2, 2020. He was released on September 5, 2020, and signed to the practice squad the next day. He signed a reserve/future contract on January 4, 2021. He was released on August 24, 2021.

=== Tampa Bay Buccanners ===
On September 13, 2021, Tinker was signed by the Tampa Bay Buccaneers. He was released on November 23.

=== Las Vegas Raiders ===
On December 1, 2021, Tinker was signed by the Las Vegas Raiders. He was released on December 9 after Trent Sieg returned to the active roster from the Reserve/COVID list.

=== Los Angeles Rams (first stint) ===
On December 18, 2021, Tinker was signed to the Los Angeles Rams practice squad. Tinker won his first Super Bowl ring when the Rams defeated the Cincinnati Bengals in Super Bowl LVI.

=== Seattle Seahawks ===
On September 8, 2022, Tinker signed with the practice squad of the Seattle Seahawks. He was signed to the active roster six days later.

=== Jacksonville Jaguars (second stint) ===
On August 14, 2023, Tinker signed with the Jaguars. He was released on August 20, 2023.

=== Los Angeles Rams (second stint) ===
On December 12, 2023, Tinker was signed by the Rams to their active roster.

== Personal life ==
Tinker was born on November 15, 1989, in Decatur, Alabama. On April 27, 2011, Tinker suffered a personal tragedy when his girlfriend Ashley Harrison was killed during the 2011 Tuscaloosa – Birmingham tornado. In recognition for his efforts in helping the Tuscaloosa community rebuild in the aftermath of the tornado, Tinker was named as a finalist for the 2011 Sportsman of the Year. On May 1, 2014, Tinker published his first book, A Season to Remember: Faith in the Midst of the Storm (B&H Publishing Group, Nashville TN), which details his experience in the 2011 Tuscaloosa tornado as well as the 2011–12 University of Alabama football championship season. He has also been focused on promoting his foundation, The Be A Blessing Foundation, a tax-exempt 501(c)-3 charitable foundation created to help those who have suffered any kind of loss or hardship, to stop living in their circumstance and begin living in their vision.
