= DeAndrew White =

American football player (born 1991)

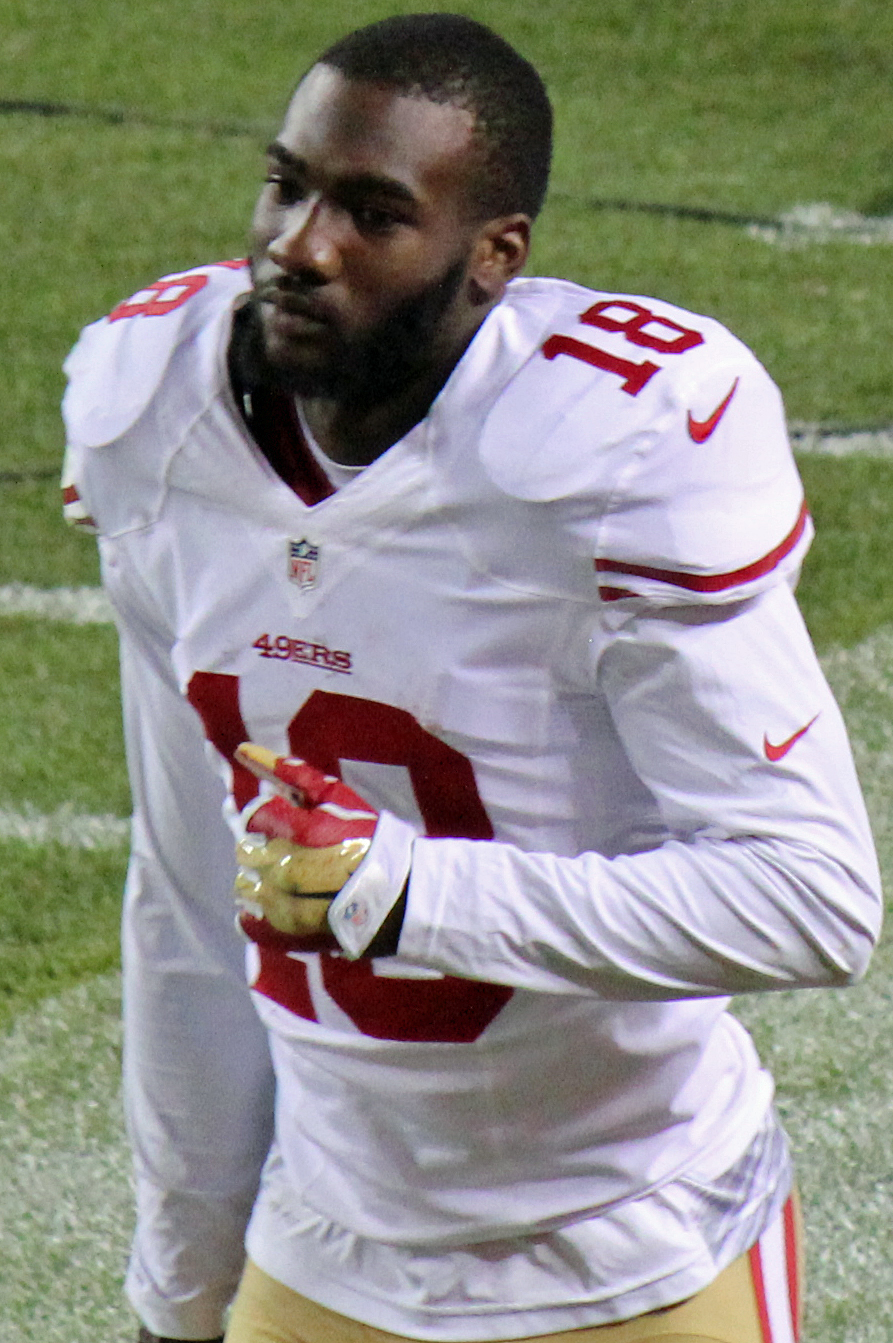
- White with the San Francisco 49ers in the 2015 NFL preseason

No. 18, 11
- Position: Wide receiver

Personal information
- Born: October 16, 1991 (age 35); Houston, Texas, U.S.
- Listed height: 6 ft 0 in (1.83 m)
- Listed weight: 192 lb (87 kg)

Career information
- High school: North Shore (Houston)
- College: Alabama
- NFL draft: 2015: undrafted

Career history
- San Francisco 49ers (2015); New England Patriots (2016–2017)*; Houston Texans (2017); Denver Broncos (2018)*; Carolina Panthers (2018–2019); Baltimore Ravens (2020)
- * Offseason or practice squad member only

Awards and highlights
- Super Bowl champion (LI); 2× BCS national champion (2011, 2012)

Career NFL statistics
- Games played: 16
- Receptions: 7
- Receiving yards: 93
- Stats at Pro Football Reference

DeAndrew White (born October 16, 1991) is an American former professional football player who was a wide receiver in the National Football League (NFL). He played college football for the Alabama Crimson Tide. White signed with the San Francisco 49ers as an undrafted free agent in 2015. He was a member of the New England Patriots' Super Bowl LI victory against the Atlanta Falcons.

== Early life ==
White attended North Shore High School, where he was a U.S. Army All-American and a SuperPrep All-American. White was ranked according to Scout.com as the 13th prospect at wide receiver. White also was selected and played in the 2010 U.S. Army All-American Game. White was selected as member of the PrepStar Dream Team.

== College career ==
Regarded as a 4-star recruit, White committed to Alabama. He finished his freshman season with 14 receptions for 151 yards and 2 touchdowns. With the departure of Marquis Maze, White stepped into the starting position. White injured his knee against Ole Miss and missed the rest of the season. He finished 2012 with 8 receptions and 105 yards. White had his best season in 2013. White had his first 100-yard performance against Oklahoma, finishing with 3 receptions for 139 yards and 1 touchdown. White finished the 2013 season with 32 receptions for 534 yards and 4 touchdowns. White got injured in the 2014 season opener against West Virginia and missed 2 weeks. He came back against Florida. White's best game of the season came against Missouri, in which he had 4 receptions for 101 yards and 1 touchdown. White finished the season with 40 receptions for 504 yards and 4 touchdowns.

== Professional career ==
=== San Francisco 49ers ===
On May 2, 2015, White signed with the San Francisco 49ers following the conclusion of the 2015 NFL draft. He played in four games primarily on special teams as a rookie, returning six kickoffs for 142 yards and one punt for four yards along with two receptions for 18 yards on offense. On September 3, 2016, he was released by the 49ers.

=== New England Patriots ===
On September 14, 2016, White was signed to the Patriots' practice squad. As a member of the New England Patriots, he won his first Super Bowl championship when the Patriots defeated the Atlanta Falcons 34-28 in Super Bowl LI.

White was re-signed by the Patriots on May 21, 2017. He was released on June 22, 2017.

=== Houston Texans ===
On August 1, 2017, White signed with the Houston Texans. On August 14, 2017, he was waived/injured by the Texans with a serious groin injury and placed on injured reserve. He was waived from injured reserve with an injury settlement on August 21, 2017. He was re-signed to the Texans' practice squad on November 29, 2017. He was promoted to the active roster on December 5, 2017. He was waived on August 13, 2018.

=== Denver Broncos ===
On August 14, 2018, White was claimed off waivers by the Denver Broncos. He was waived on September 1, 2018.

=== Carolina Panthers ===
On September 11, 2018, White was signed to the Carolina Panthers' practice squad. He was released on October 1, 2018. He was re-signed on December 5, 2018.

White signed a reserve/future contract with the Panthers on December 31, 2018. He was waived during final roster cuts on August 31, 2019, and was signed to the practice squad the next day. He was promoted to the active roster on October 22, 2019.

The Panthers re-signed White on March 25, 2020. He was released on August 16, 2020.

=== Baltimore Ravens ===
White had a tryout with the Pittsburgh Steelers on August 17, 2020. and with the Baltimore Ravens on August 22, 2020. White signed with the Ravens on August 25, 2020, but was put on injured reserve six days later. White was not brought back after the 2020 season.
