= Phillip Sims (American football) =

American gridiron football player and coach (born 1992)

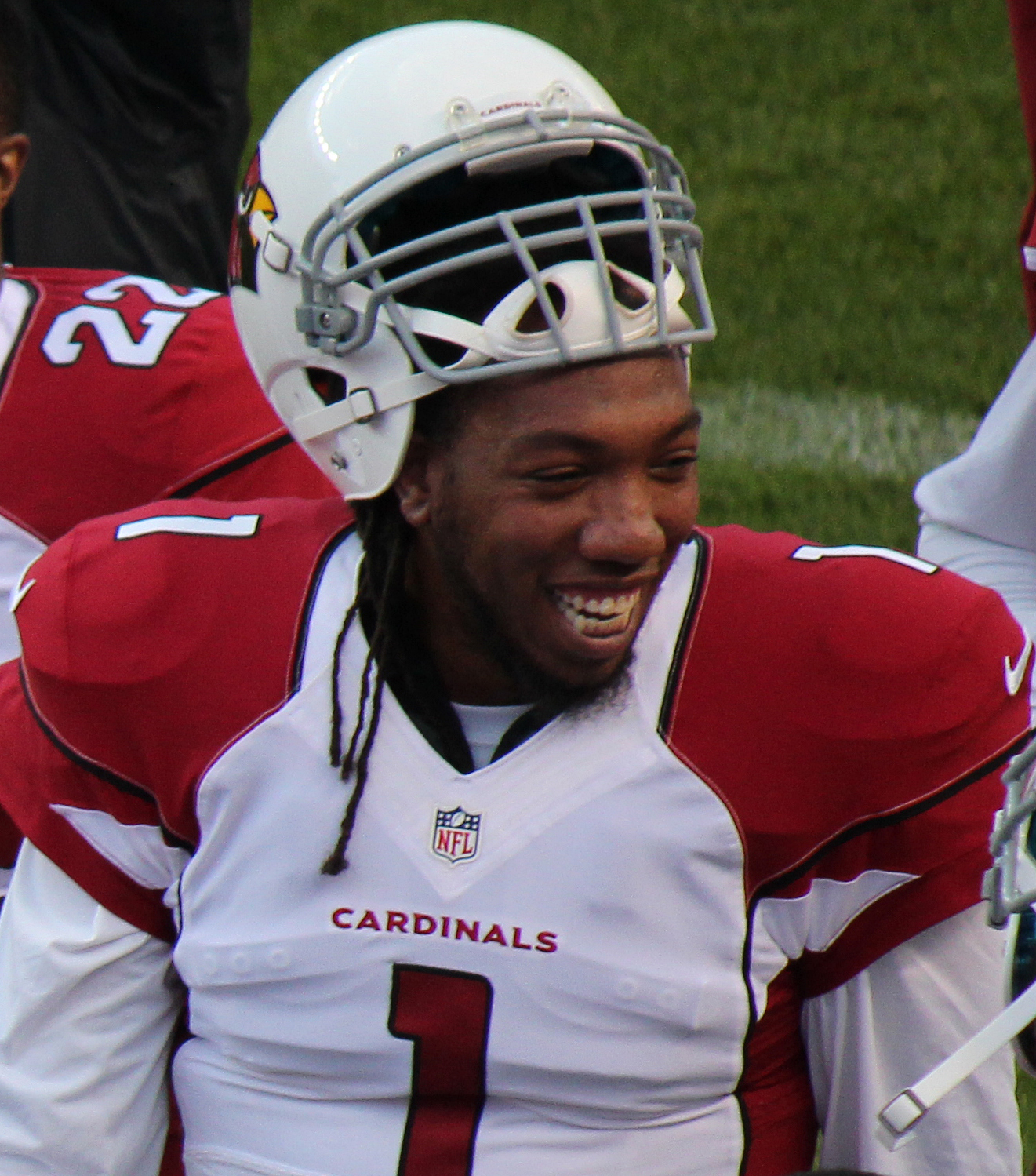
- Sims with the Arizona Cardinals in 2015

No. 1, 6
- Position: Quarterback

Personal information
- Born: August 15, 1992 (age 34); Chesapeake, Virginia, U.S.
- Listed height: 6 ft 1 in (1.85 m)
- Listed weight: 227 lb (103 kg)

Career information
- High school: Chesapeake (VA) Smith
- College: Alabama (2010–2011); Virginia (2012); Winston-Salem State (2013–2014)
- NFL draft: 2015: undrafted

Career history
- Arizona Cardinals (2015)*; Seattle Seahawks (2016)*; Saskatchewan Roughriders (2016)
- * Offseason or practice squad member only

Awards and highlights
- 2012 BCS national champion

Phillip Sims (born August 15, 1992) is an American football coach and former player. He played college football at Alabama, Virginia and Winston-Salem State. After going undrafted in the 2015 NFL draft, Sims was signed by the Arizona Cardinals. He was also a member of the Seattle Seahawks and Saskatchewan Roughriders. He has been a head football coach at several high schools after his playing career.

== Early life ==
Sims attended Oscar F. Smith High School in Chesapeake, Virginia where he graduated in 2010. Sims was one of the top recruits coming out of high school and was a five star recruit.

College recruiting
Name	Hometown	School	Height	Weight	Commit date
Phillip Sims; QB	Chesapeake, Virginia	Oscar F. Smith High School	6 ft 2 in (1.88 m)	215 lb (98 kg)	Apr 15, 2009
Phillip Sims; QB	Recruit ratings: Scout: Rivals: 247Sports:				
Overall recruit ranking: Scout: 2 (QB) Rivals: 2 (QB), 2 (VA Rank)
Note: In many cases, Scout, Rivals, 247Sports, On3, and ESPN may conflict in their listings of height and weight.; In these cases, the average was taken. ESPN grades are on a 100-point scale.; Sources: "2010 Alabama Football Recruiting Commits". Scout.; "Scout.com Team Recruiting Rankings". Scout.; "2010 Team Ranking". Rivals.com.

== College career ==
Coming out of high school Sims committed to play football for Alabama. Sims sat out for his true freshman season in 2010 to redshirt. In 2011 Sims was the backup quarterback to A. J. McCarron and played in eight different games. Sims was a member of the team that won the 2012 BCS National Championship Game.

Sims transferred to Virginia from Alabama in May 2012 and was granted a waiver by the NCAA to play immediately due to his father’s health situation. He appeared in all 12 games during the 2012 season throwing for 1,263 yards with nine touchdowns and four interceptions.

Sims transferred to Winston-Salem State from Virginia in 2013 after being ruled academically ineligible at Virginia. Sims was forced to sit out for the 2013 season due to transfer rules. In 2014 Sims played in all 11 games. Splitting time at QB, Sims was the team’s leading passer completing 118-of-198 passes for 1,560 yards and 15 touchdowns and four interceptions.

== Professional career ==
Pre-draft measurables
Height	Weight	Arm length	Hand span	Wingspan	40-yard dash	10-yard split	20-yard split	20-yard shuttle	Three-cone drill	Vertical jump	Broad jump
6 ft 0 3/4 in (1.85 m)	227 lb (103 kg)	31 1/4 in (0.79 m)	8 5/8 in (0.22 m)	6 ft 4 1/2 in (1.94 m)	4.95 s	1.62 s	2.78 s	4.80 s	7.72 s	31.0 in (0.79 m)	8 ft 7 in (2.62 m)
All values from Pro Day

On May 2, 2015, after going undrafted, Sims was invited to an Arizona Cardinals' rookie camp on a tryout basis. On May 10, 2015, Sims was signed by the Cardinals. On September 4, 2015, Sims was waived from the Cardinals' roster as part of their roster cuts to 53 players.

On January 4, 2016, Sims signed a futures contract with the Seattle Seahawks. On April 28, 2016, Sims was waived by the Seattle Seahawks after less than a year with the team.

On June 6, 2016, Sims was signed by the Saskatchewan Roughriders of the Canadian Football League (CFL). He competed for a backup spot with Brett Smith and B. J. Coleman. Sims was placed on the injured list on June 19, four days before the start of the regular season. He was released by the Roughriders on July 5, 2016.

== Coaching career ==
In 2017, Sims was named the head football coach at John Marshall High School in Virginia.

On January 31, 2020, Sims accepted the head coaching position at J.R. Tucker High School in Henrico County, also in the Richmond metropolitan area.

On January 11, 2023, Sims accepted the head coaching position at Princess Anne High School in Virginia Beach, Virginia. On November 12, 2024, Sims resigned as head football coach at Princess Anne after two seasons and an overall record of 0–20.
