= Marquis Maze =

American football player (born 1988)

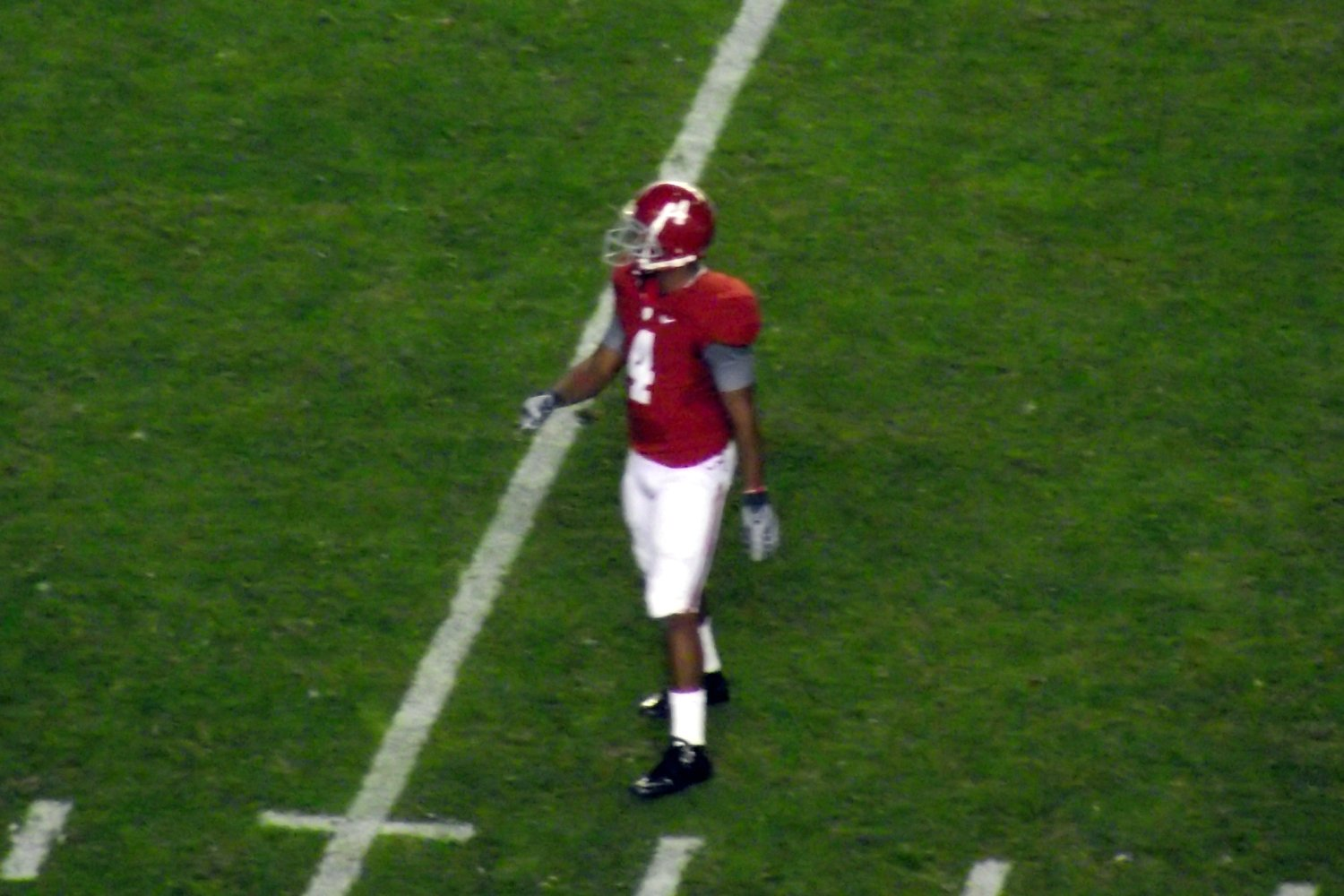
- Maze with Alabama in 2010

Profile
- Position: Wide receiver

Personal information
- Born: March 2, 1988 (age 38); Birmingham, Alabama, U.S.
- Listed height: 5 ft 8 in (1.73 m)
- Listed weight: 186 lb (84 kg)

Career information
- High school: Tarrant (Tarrant, Alabama)
- College: Alabama
- NFL draft: 2012: undrafted

Career history
- Pittsburgh Steelers (2012)*; Arizona Rattlers (2015)*
- * Offseason or practice squad member only

Awards and highlights
- BCS national champion (2010, 2012); Second-team All-SEC (2011)

Tyran Marquis Maze (born March 2, 1988) is an American former professional football player who was a wide receiver in the National Football League (NFL). He played college football for the Alabama Crimson Tide from 2008 to 2011. In 2011, he became the lead receiver, punt returner, and kickoff returner for Alabama.

== Early life ==
Maze was born in Birmingham, Alabama. He attended Tarrant High School in Tarrant, Alabama. He played high school football at multiple positions, including tailback, quarterback, wide receiver, defensive back and punt and kickoff returner. During the 2005 and 2006 seasons, Maze had almost 3,000 all-purpose yards and more than 30 touchdowns.

Maze was recruited by many of the country's top football programs, including the University of Alabama, University of Michigan, and University of Tennessee. After initially committing to Michigan, Maze signed a letter of intent with Alabama in February 2007.

== College career ==
=== 2008 season ===
After redshirting in 2007, Marquis played in all 14 games in 2008 and for the season had 11 receptions for 137 yards and 2 touchdowns.

=== 2009 season ===
During Alabama's spring practice in April 2009, Maze earned co-MVP honors and established himself as the fastest player on the Alabama team and the No. 2 receiver behind Julio Jones. Maze became a key player on the 2009 Alabama Crimson Tide football team that won the national championship. He played in all 14 games, 11 as a starter. He finished with 31 catches for 523 yards for two touchdowns. In the 2009 SEC Championship Game, Maze had five catches for a career-high 96 receiving yards.

=== 2010 season ===
For the 2010 season, Maze appeared in all 13 games for Alabama, seven as a starter. He had 38 receptions for 557 yards and three touchdowns. In the game against Florida, Maze threw a 19-yard touchdown pass to Michael Williams. In the 2011 Capital One Bowl, Maze caught a 37-yard touchdown pass and led the team's receivers with 77 receiving yards. Maze also served as Alabama's principal punt returner during the 2010 season.

=== 2011 season ===
In March 2011, Maze announced that he would not participate in the NFL draft and would instead return to Alabama for his senior year. Maze gave little thought to leaving Alabama for the NFL With Julio Jones graduating, Maze was expected to become Alabama's No. 1 receiver in the 2011 season. Based on his performance in the preseason, Maze won a starting spot not only at wide receiver but also on special teams as the team's primary punt returner and kickoff returner. In July 2011, he was included on the watch list for the 2011 Fred Biletnikoff Award, presented each year to America's top college football receiver.

In the 2011 season opener against Kent State, Maze established himself as Alabama's primary receiver. He contributed 253 all purposes yards, including 114 receiving yards on eight catches, 96 return yards on eight punts, and 39 yards on a kickoff return. His eight punt returns tied an Alabama school record set in 1946 by College Football Hall of Fame inductee Harry Gilmer. After the game, Alabama head coach Nick Saban said, "Marquis Maze did a fantastic job today, not only with eight catches, but also doing a really good job in the kicking game and return game."

After the first three games of the 2011 season, Maze led all players in the NCAA FBS with 195 punt return yards.

In the fourth game of the 2011 season, Maze returned four punts for 125 yards, including an 83-yard return for a touchdown in the third quarter. After the game, the Birmingham News called Maze "the amazing Marquis Maze" and a "special player" and wrote: "The undersized and underappreciated Maze bobbed and weaved his way 83 yards for a third-quarter touchdown on a punt return that broke Arkansas ankles and hearts. His last cutback wasn't even necessary. It was unreal, unfair and unstoppable." The return earned Alabama Play of the Week honors from al.com. Writing in The Huntsville Times, Mark McCarter observed: "Maze didn't look like he was running on his own. He looked like an avatar, and a 16-year-old's thumbs were maneuvering him with a PlayStation control panel."

Playing against Tennessee on October 22, 2011, Maze caught five passes for 106 yards. Through the first eight games of the season, Maze had 482 receiving yards. As of October 23, 2011, Maze also had 320 punt return yards, second most in the Football Bowl Subdivision. In the 2012 BCS National Championship Game against LSU, Maze almost returned a punt for a touchdown before being injured from a hamstring pull. This injury unfortunately proved to be game-ending for him.

== Professional career ==
=== Pittsburgh Steelers ===
On April 28, 2012, Maze signed a free-agent deal with the Pittsburgh Steelers. On August 31, Maze was waived by the Pittsburgh Steelers.

=== Arizona Rattlers ===
On September 25, 2014, Maze was assigned to the Arizona Rattlers of the Arena Football League.

== See also ==
- Alabama Crimson Tide football yearly statistical leaders
