= 2011 Capital One Bowl =

American college football game

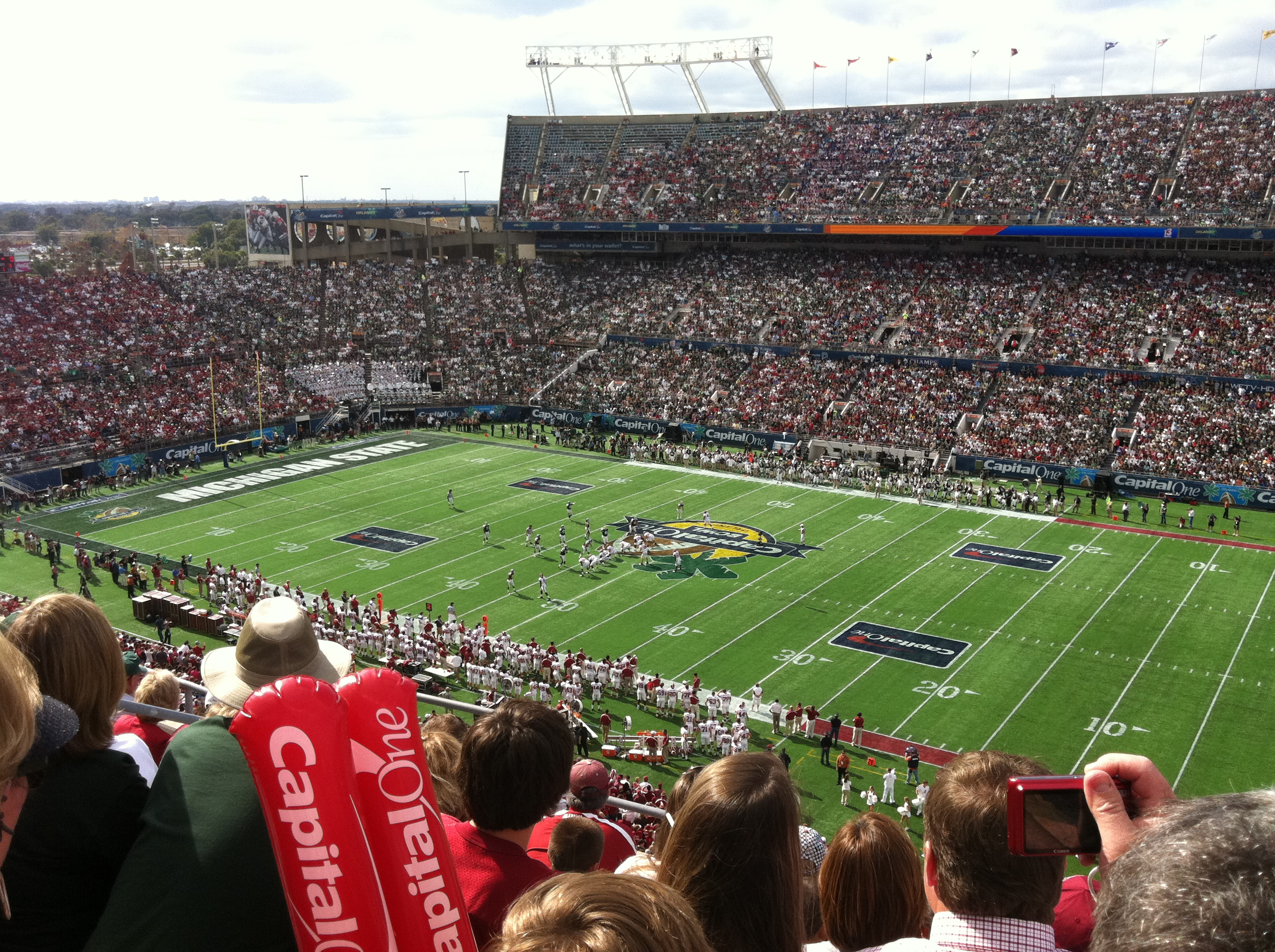
Alabama Crimson Tide	Michigan State Spartans
(9–3)	(11–1)
SEC	Big Ten
49	7
Head coach: Nick Saban	Head coach: Mark Dantonio
AP / Coaches / BCS; 15 / 18 / 16	AP / Coaches / BCS; 7 / 7 / 9
	1	2	3	4	Total
Alabama	7	21	14	7	49
Michigan State	0	0	0	7	7
- Date: January 1, 2011
- Season: 2010
- Stadium: Florida Citrus Bowl
- Location: Orlando, Florida
- MVP: LB Courtney Upshaw, Alabama
- National anthem: Liberty Voices
- Referee: Greg Burks (Big 12)
- Attendance: 61,519
- Payout: US$4,250,000

United States TV coverage
- Network: ESPN
- Announcers: Brad Nessler, Todd Blackledge, and Holly Rowe
- Nielsen ratings: 4.3

The 2011 Capital One Bowl was the sixty-fifth edition of the college football bowl game, and was played at the Citrus Bowl in Orlando, Florida. The game was played on January 1, 2011 and matched the Alabama Crimson Tide from the Southeastern Conference (SEC) with the Michigan State Spartans from the Big Ten Conference. Televised by ESPN, Alabama won by a final score of 49–7.

== Teams ==
=== Alabama ===
The defending National Champions Alabama Crimson Tide entered the game with a 9–3 record. The Tide were led by All-American wide receiver Julio Jones who set school records in catches with 75 and yards with 1,084 this season. 2009 Heisman Trophy winner Mark Ingram II had been held to less than 100 yards rushing for eight straight games. Alabama's strength had been in their defense which led the SEC giving up 14.1 points and 296.0 yards per game as well as forcing 21 interceptions. Alabama made its second appearance in the Bowl Game. They defeated Ohio State 24–17 in the 1995 game when it was known as the CompUSA Florida Citrus Bowl.

=== Michigan State ===
Michigan State was one of the surprises of the 2010 season and narrowly missed out on a BCS Bowl berth. The 11–1 Spartans won a share of the Big Ten Championship for the first time in 20 years. Although they finished 9th in the final BCS standings they would not be allowed to be selected to a BCS Bowl due to a rule that three teams from the same conference cannot all appear in BCS Bowl games. State was led by tailback Edwin Baker, who ranked third in the Big Ten with 1,187 yards rushing. The Spartans played without leading wide receiver B. J. Cunningham, who broke his foot in practice prior to the bowl. Michigan State made its third appearance in the game, having defeated Florida in 2000 and losing to Georgia in 2009.

== Game summary ==
Alabama scored touchdowns on their first four offensive possessions. Mark Ingram II scored first on a one-yard touchdown run to cap a 13-play, 79-yard drive on Alabama's first possession. After a Robert Lester interception of a Kirk Cousins pass on the Spartans' opening drive, the Tide scored on the ensuing possession on an eight-yard Trent Richardson touchdown run early in the second quarter. Alabama extended their lead to 28–0 at the half following touchdown runs of six and 35 yards by Ingram and Julio Jones.

After holding Michigan State to a three-and-out to open the third quarter, Alabama scored its fifth touchdown in six offensive possessions after Marquis Maze scored on a 37-yard reception from Greg McElroy. Up by 35 points late in the third, the Tide pulled many of their starters that resulted in many players seeing action from deep in the depth chart. Third-string back Eddie Lacy extended the lead to 49–0 with touchdown runs of twelve yards in the third and 62 yards in the fourth quarter. The Spartans scored their only points late in the fourth on a 49-yard Bennie Fowler touchdown reception from Keith Nichol to bring the final score to 49–7.

For his performance which included two sacks, a tackle for loss and a forced fumble, Alabama linebacker Courtney Upshaw was named the game's Most Valuable Player.

Scoring summary

Quarter	Time	Drive			Team	Scoring information	Score	
Quarter	Time	Plays	Yards	TOP	Team	Scoring information	ALA	MSU
1	8:20	13	79	6:40	ALA	Mark Ingram II 1-yard touchdown run, Jeremy Shelley kick good	7	0
2	14:33	8	62	2:48	ALA	Trent Richardson 8-yard touchdown run, Jeremy Shelley kick good	14	0
2	6:46	7	80	2:22	ALA	Mark Ingram II 6-yard touchdown run, Jeremy Shelley kick good	21	0
2	3:50	3	44	1:20	ALA	Julio Jones 35-yard touchdown run, Jeremy Shelley kick good	28	0
3	12:00	4	79	1:23	ALA	Marquis Maze 37-yard touchdown reception from Greg McElroy, Jeremy Shelley kick good	35	0
3	1:09	10	58	5:00	ALA	Eddie Lacy 12-yard touchdown run, Jeremy Shelley kick good	42	0
4	8:58	3	84	1:19	ALA	Eddie Lacy 62-yard touchdown run, Jeremy Shelley kick good	49	0
4	5:45	7	69	3:05	MSU	Bennie Fowler 49-yard touchdown reception from Keith Nichol, Dan Conroy kick good	49	7
"TOP" = time of possession. For other American football terms, see Glossary of American football.							49	7

=== Statistics ===
Statistic	MSU	Bama
First downs	12	25
Total offense, plays - yards	60–171	75–546
Rushes-yards (net)	28– -48	44–275
Passing yards (net)	287	271
Passes, Comp-Att-Int	29–14	23–19
Time of possession	16:10	19:42

== Game notes ==
This was the first ever meeting between the two schools. Michigan State head coach Mark Dantonio was an assistant coach for Alabama head coach Nick Saban when Saban coached at State from 1995 to 1999.

Somewhat ignominiously, Michigan State was forced into the unusual circumstance of punting on 4th and goal in the second quarter, due to a fumble that left the Spartans at the 38-yard line.
