= 2012 Alabama Crimson Tide football team =

American college football season

2012 Alabama Crimson Tide football

Consensus national champion SEC champion SEC Western Division champion

SEC Championship Game, W 32–28 vs. Georgia

BCS National Championship Game, W 42–14 vs. Notre Dame
- Conference: Southeastern Conference
- Western Division

Ranking
- Coaches: No. 1
- AP: No. 1
- Record: 13–1 (7–1 SEC)
- Head coach: Nick Saban (6th season)
- Offensive coordinator: Doug Nussmeier (1st season)
- Offensive scheme: Multiple pro-style
- Defensive coordinator: Kirby Smart (5th season)
- Base defense: 3–4
- MVP: C. J. Mosley
- Captains: Barrett Jones; Damion Square; Chance Warmack
- Home stadium: Bryant–Denny Stadium

2012 Southeastern Conference football standings
	Conf.			Overall
Team	W		L	W		L
Eastern Division
No. T–5 Georgia xy	7	–	1	12	–	2
No. 9 Florida x%	7	–	1	11	–	2
No. 8 South Carolina	6	–	2	11	–	2
No. 23 Vanderbilt	5	–	3	9	–	4
Missouri	2	–	6	5	–	7
Tennessee	1	–	7	5	–	7
Kentucky	0	–	8	2	–	10
Western Division
No. 1 Alabama x$#	7	–	1	13	–	1
No. 14 LSU *	6	–	2	10	–	3
No. T–5 Texas A&M	6	–	2	11	–	2
Mississippi State	4	–	4	8	–	5
Ole Miss *	3	–	5	7	–	6
Arkansas	2	–	6	4	–	8
Auburn	0	–	8	3	–	9
Championship: Alabama 32, Georgia 28
# – BCS National Champion; $ – BCS representative as conference champion; % – BCS at-large representative; x – Division champion/co-champions; y – Championship game participant; * Ole Miss and LSU vacated all wins due to NCAA violations.; Rankings from AP Poll

The 2012 Alabama Crimson Tide football team represented the University of Alabama in the 2012 National Collegiate Athletic Association (NCAA) Division I Football Bowl Subdivision (FBS) football season. It marked the Crimson Tide's 118th overall season of playing college football, 79th as a member of the Southeastern Conference (SEC) and 21st within the SEC Western Division. The team was led by head coach Nick Saban, in his sixth year, and played its home games at Bryant–Denny Stadium in Tuscaloosa, Alabama. It finished the season with a record of 13 wins and 1 loss (13–1 overall, 7–1 in the SEC), as SEC champion and as consensus national champion after it defeated Notre Dame in the Bowl Championship Series (BCS) National Championship Game.

After they captured the 2011 national championship, the Crimson Tide signed a highly rated recruiting class in February 2012 and completed spring practice the following April. With twelve returning starters from the previous season, Alabama entered the 2012 season as the defending national champions, ranked as the number two team in the nation and as a favorite to win the Western Division and compete for both the SEC and national championships. The Crimson Tide opened the season with nine consecutive victories that included one over Michigan at a neutral site and a come-from-behind victory on the road at Louisiana State University (LSU). In their tenth game, Alabama was upset by Texas A&M, and dropped to the number four position in the rankings. However, after a series of upsets and victories in their final three games that included winning the SEC Championship over Georgia, Alabama qualified for the 2013 BCS National Championship Game against Notre Dame, where they won 42–14 and captured the 2012 national championship. Alabama were the last team to repeat as national champions until the 2021-2022 Georgia Bulldogs.

At the conclusion of the season, the Alabama defense led the nation in total defense, scoring defense and rushing defense and ranked seventh in passing defense. Offensively, the Alabama offense ranked 12th in scoring offense, 16th in rushing offense, 31st in total offense and 75th in passing offense. Starting quarterback A. J. McCarron was ranked first nationally in pass efficiency. Additionally, several players were recognized for their individual accomplishments on the field. Starting center Barrett Jones won both the Rimington Trophy and the William V. Campbell Trophy, and was named as the Academic All-America of the Year; defensive coordinator Kirby Smart was named the 2012 American Football Coaches Association (AFCA) FBS Assistant Coach of the Year. Also, five players were named to various All-America Teams with Jones and C. J. Mosley being consensus selections and Dee Milliner and Chance Warmack being unanimous selections.

== Before the season ==
=== Spring practice ===
Spring practice began on March 9 and concluded with the annual A-Day game on April 14. The only players that did not compete during the spring practice period were Eddie Lacy, Blake Sims and Arie Kouandjio due to injuries; and Duron Carter, Michael Bowman and Ronald Carswell due to team suspensions.

A-Day

Team	1	2	3	4	Total
• White	0	3	14	7	24
Crimson	0	9	6	0	15

- Location: Tuscaloosa, Alabama
- Game start: 2:05 p.m.
- Elapsed time: 2:02
- Game attendance: 78,526
- Game weather: 80 °F (27 °C), Clear, Winds SSE 14
- Referee: Thomas Ritter
- TV announcers (CSS): Chris Stewart (play-by-play), Tyler Watts (color), Tom Roberts (sideline)

In the annual A-Day game at the conclusion of spring practice, the White team composed of defensive starters defeated the Crimson team of offensive starters 24–15. The Crimson team opened on offense and on their first offensive play, A. J. McCarron threw an interception to Robert Lester. Each team then traded punts and the first quarter ended tied at zero. On the first offensive play of the second quarter, T. J. Yeldon was tackled in the endzone for a safety to give the Crimson team a 2–0 lead. The White team responded on their next possession with a 48-yard Cade Foster field goal and took a 3–2 lead before McCarron threw a 17-yard touchdown pass to Christion Jones that gave the Crimson team a 9–3 halftime lead.

In the third quarter, the White team scored a pair of touchdowns on successive possessions and took a 17–9 lead. Both were made on a pair of long Phillip Sims touchdown passes to Chris Black on a 44-yard reception and to Yeldon on a 50-yard reception. The Crimson team responded with a two-play, 70-yard drive that saw a Dee Hart run of 23 yards and a 47-yard McCarron touchdown pass to Kenny Bell. After the unsuccessful two-point conversion, the White team led 17–15 at the end of the third quarter. In the fourth, both defenses again held both offenses scoreless. The only points came late in the game when Vinnie Sunseri recovered a Michael Williams fumble and returned it 21 yards for a touchdown and a 24–15 White victory.

For his performance, Adrian Hubbard earned the Dwight Stephenson Lineman of the A-Day Game Award. In the game, Hubbard had seven tackles that included four tackles for a loss and three quarterback sacks. On offense, Yeldon earned the Dixie Howell Memorial Most Valuable Player of the A-Day Game Award for his 179 all-purpose yards on the day that included 88 rushing and 91 receiving, and a 50-yard touchdown reception.

=== Fall camp ===
By August, Alabama had a combined 31 players on 13 different preseason award watch lists. These players included Nico Johnson, Robert Lester, C. J. Mosley and Jesse Williams for the Chuck Bednarik Award; Johnson and Mosley for the Butkus Award; Barrett Jones and A. J. McCarron for the Walter Camp Award; Jeremy Shelley for the Lou Groza Award; D. J. Fluker, Johnson, Jones, Mosley, Chance Warmack and Williams for the Lombardi Award; Michael Williams for the John Mackey Award; Eddie Lacy and McCarron for the Maxwell Award; Johnson, Lester, Dee Milliner, Mosley and Williams for the Bronko Nagurski Trophy; McCarron for the Davey O'Brien Award; Fluker, Jones, Warmack and Williams for the Outland Trophy; Jones for the Rimington Trophy; Lester for the Jim Thorpe Award; and Lacy for the Doak Walker Award. On August 3, the first official summer practice was held at the Thomas-Drew Practice Facility, and on August 28, Saban released the depth chart for the game one starters against Michigan.

== Coaching staff ==
Alabama head coach Nick Saban was in his sixth year as the Crimson Tide's head coach for the 2012 season. During his previous five years with Alabama, he led the Crimson Tide to an overall record of 50 wins and 12 losses (50–12) and both the 2009 and 2011 national championships. On January 18, 2012, Alabama officially hired Doug Nussmeier from the Washington Huskies as offensive coordinator and Lance Thompson from the Tennessee Volunteers as outside linebackers coach. Nussmeier took the place of Jim McElwain who left to become the head coach at Colorado State, and Thompson took the place of Sal Sunseri who left to become the defensive coordinator at Tennessee.

Name	Position	Seasons at Alabama	Alma mater
Nick Saban	Head coach	6	Kent State (1973)
Burton Burns	Associate head coach, running backs	6	Nebraska (1976)
Mike Groh	Receivers, recruiting coordinator	2	Virginia (1995)
Doug Nussmeier	Offensive coordinator, quarterbacks	1	Idaho (1993)
Jeremy Pruitt	Secondary	3	West Alabama (1999)
Chris Rumph	Defensive line	2	South Carolina (1994)
Kirby Smart	Defensive coordinator, linebackers	6	Georgia (1999)
Jeff Stoutland	Assistant head coach, offensive line	2	Southern Connecticut (1984)
Lance Thompson	Linebackers	3	The Citadel (1987)
Bobby Williams	Tight ends, special teams	5	Purdue (1982)
Scott Cochran	Strength and conditioning	6	LSU (2001)

=== Analysts ===
Offensive analysts

- Kevin Garver
- Jules Montinar
- Jeff Norrid
- Chris Samuels
- Kelvin Sigler
- Jody Wright

Defensive analysts

- Dean Altobelli
- Russ Callaway
- George Helow
- Wesley Neighbors
- Glenn Schumann

Special Teams analysts

- John Wozniak

=== Graduate assistants ===
- Tim Castille
- Glenn Schumann
- John Van Dam

== Roster ==
=== Departed starters ===
At the conclusion of the 2011 season, of all the draft-eligible junior starters, Dont'a Hightower, Dre Kirkpatrick and Trent Richardson declared their eligibility for the 2012 National Football League (NFL) draft. In addition to those who declared early, several other starters graduated after the 2011 season. Graduating starters on Alabama's offense included Darius Hanks and Marquis Maze at wide receiver, Brad Smelley at tight end and William Vlachos at center. Graduating starters on Alabama's defense included Mark Barron at safety, Josh Chapman at nose guard, Jerrell Harris and Courtney Upshaw at linebacker and DeQuan Menzie at cornerback. The only graduating starter on Alabama's special teams was Maze as the return specialist.

=== Returning starters ===
==== Offense ====
Player	Class	Position
A. J. McCarron	Junior	Quarterback
Chance Warmack	Senior	Left Guard
Michael Williams	Senior	Tight End
Barrett Jones	Senior	Left Tackle
D. J. Fluker	Junior	Right Tackle
Anthony Steen	Junior	Right Guard

==== Defense ====
Player	Class	Position
C. J. Mosley	Junior	Linebacker
Nico Johnson	Senior	Linebacker
Dee Milliner	Junior	Cornerback
Damion Square	Senior	Defensive End
Robert Lester	Senior	Safety
Jesse Williams	Senior	Defensive End

==== Special teams ====
Player	Class	Position
Cade Foster	Junior	Placekicker
Jeremy Shelley	Senior	Placekicker
Cody Mandell	Junior	Punter
Carson Tinker	Senior	Long Snapper

=== Depth chart ===
Starters and backups:

Defense

FS
Vinnie Sunseri
Ha Ha Clinton-Dix
Landon Collins

WLB	ILB	ILB	SLB
Xzavier Dickson	Nico Johnson	Trey DePriest	⋅
Denzel Devall	C. J. Mosley	Nico Johnson	⋅
⋅	Tana Patrick	Reggie Ragland	⋅

SS
Robert Lester
Nick Perry
⋅

CB
Deion Belue
Geno Smith
⋅

DE	NT	DE
Ed Stinson	Jesse Williams	Damion Square
Jeoffrey Pagan	Brandon Ivory	Quinton Dial
⋅	⋅	⋅

CB
Dee Milliner
John Fulton
Jeremy Turner

Offense

WR
DeAndrew White
Amari Cooper
Marvin Shinn

LT	LG	C	RG	RT
Cyrus Kouandjio	Chance Warmack	Barrett Jones	Anthony Steen	D. J. Fluker
Kellen Williams	Chad Lindsay	Ryan Kelly	Arie Kouandjio	Austin Shepherd
⋅	⋅	⋅	⋅	⋅

TE
Michael Williams
Brian Vogler
⋅

WR
Kevin Norwood
Kenny Bell
⋅

QB
A. J. McCarron
Blake Sims
Phillip Ely

Key reserves

RB
Eddie Lacy
T. J. Yeldon
Kenyan Drake

FB
Kelly Johnson
Harrison Jones
Brent Calloway

Special teams
PK Jeremy Shelley
PK Cade Foster
P Cody Mandell
P Jeremy Shelley
KR Christion Jones
PR Christion Jones
LS Carson Tinker
H A. J. McCarron

=== Recruiting class ===
Prior to National Signing Day on February 1, 2012, six high school players that graduated early and two junior college transfers of the 2012 recruiting class enrolled for the spring semester in order to participate in spring practice. These early enrollments included: defensive lineman Ryan Anderson, wide receivers Chris Black and Amari Cooper, linebacker Dillon Lee, defensive tackle Alphonse Taylor and running back T. J. Yeldon from high school and defensive backs Deion Belue and Travell Dixon from junior college. On February 1, seventeen additional players signed their National Letter of Intent to play at Alabama that completed the 2012 recruiting class.

Alabama's recruiting class was highlighted by thirteen players from the "ESPN 150": No. 6 Landon Collins (safety); No. 11 Eddie Williams (athlete); No. 20 Cyrus Jones (athlete); No. 22 Chris Black (wide receiver); No. 30 Brandon Greene (offensive tackle); No. 31 Geno Smith (cornerback); No. 49 Amari Cooper (wide receiver); No. 55 T. J. Yeldon (running back); No. 59 Dillon Lee (outside linebacker); No. 93 Ryan Anderson (outside linebacker); No. 100 Korren Kirven (defensive tackle); No. 109 Reggie Ragland (inside linebacker); and No. 121 Tyler Hayes (outside linebacker). The Crimson Tide signed the No. 1 recruiting class according to Rivals.com and the No. 2 recruiting class according to Scout.com. In recognition for his accomplishments in helping Alabama land its highly rated 2012 class, Jeremy Pruitt was named Recruiter of the Year by 247Sports.com.

College recruiting (2012)
Name	Hometown	School	Height	Weight	40^{‡}	Commit date
Ryan Anderson; LB	Daphne, Alabama	Daphne High School	6 ft 3 in (1.91 m)	250 lb (110 kg)	–	Apr 19, 2011
Ryan Anderson; LB	Recruit ratings: Scout: Rivals: 247Sports: ESPN:					
Deion Belue; DB	Tuscumbia, Alabama	Northeast Mississippi Community College	6 ft 0 in (1.83 m)	165 lb (75 kg)	–	Jan 11, 2012
Deion Belue; DB	Recruit ratings: Scout: Rivals: 247Sports: ESPN:					
Chris Black; WR	Jacksonville, Florida	First Coast High School	5 ft 11 in (1.80 m)	170 lb (77 kg)	–	Aug 5, 2011
Chris Black; WR	Recruit ratings: Scout: Rivals: 247Sports: ESPN:					
Landon Collins; DB	Geismar, Louisiana	Dutchtown High School	6 ft 0 in (1.83 m)	210 lb (95 kg)	4.4	Jan 5, 2012
Landon Collins; DB	Recruit ratings: Scout: Rivals: 247Sports: ESPN:					
Amari Cooper; WR	Miami, Florida	Miami Northwestern High School	6 ft 1 in (1.85 m)	175 lb (79 kg)	–	Sep 22, 2011
Amari Cooper; WR	Recruit ratings: Scout: Rivals: 247Sports: ESPN:					
Denzel Devall; MLB	Bastrop, Louisiana	Bastrop High School	6 ft 2 in (1.88 m)	240 lb (110 kg)	4.6	Dec 7, 2011
Denzel Devall; MLB	Recruit ratings: Scout: Rivals: 247Sports: ESPN:					
Travell Dixon; DB	Miami, Florida	Eastern Arizona College	6 ft 2 in (1.88 m)	200 lb (91 kg)	4.5	Dec 21, 2011
Travell Dixon; DB	Recruit ratings: Scout: Rivals: 247Sports: ESPN:					
Kenyan Drake; RB	Powder Springs, Georgia	Hillgrove High School	6 ft 0 in (1.83 m)	195 lb (88 kg)	4.4	Feb 14, 2011
Kenyan Drake; RB	Recruit ratings: Scout: Rivals: 247Sports: ESPN:					
Kurt Freitag; TE	Buford, Georgia	Buford High School	6 ft 4 in (1.93 m)	237 lb (108 kg)	–	Dec 5, 2011
Kurt Freitag; TE	Recruit ratings: Scout: Rivals: 247Sports: ESPN:					
Brandon Greene; OT	Ellenwood, Georgia	Cedar Grove High School	6 ft 6 in (1.98 m)	295 lb (134 kg)	–	Mar 5, 2011
Brandon Greene; OT	Recruit ratings: Scout: Rivals: 247Sports: ESPN:					
Adam Griffith; K	Calhoun, Georgia	Calhoun High School	5 ft 9 in (1.75 m)	165 lb (75 kg)	–	Jan 29, 2011
Adam Griffith; K	Recruit ratings: Scout: Rivals: 247Sports: ESPN:					
Caleb Gulledge; OT	Prattville, Alabama	Prattville High School	6 ft 4.5 in (1.94 m)	270 lb (120 kg)	–	Oct 2, 2010
Caleb Gulledge; OT	Recruit ratings: Scout: Rivals: 247Sports: ESPN:					
Tyler Hayes; OLB	Thomasville, Alabama	Thomasville High School	6 ft 3 in (1.91 m)	220 lb (100 kg)	–	Feb 14, 2011
Tyler Hayes; OLB	Recruit ratings: Scout: Rivals: 247Sports: ESPN:					
Brandon Hill; OG	Collierville, Tennessee	St. George's Independent Schools	6 ft 6 in (1.98 m)	350 lb (160 kg)	–	Nov 10, 2011
Brandon Hill; OG	Recruit ratings: Scout: Rivals: 247Sports: ESPN:					
Cyrus Jones; WR	Baltimore, Maryland	Gilman School	5 ft 10 in (1.78 m)	185 lb (84 kg)	4.5	Jan 5, 2012
Cyrus Jones; WR	Recruit ratings: Scout: Rivals: 247Sports: ESPN:					
Korren Kirven; DT	Lynchburg, Virginia	Brookville High School	6 ft 4 in (1.93 m)	280 lb (130 kg)	5.2	Feb 1, 2012
Korren Kirven; DT	Recruit ratings: Scout: Rivals: 247Sports: ESPN:					
Darren Lake; DT	York, Alabama	Sumter County High School	6 ft 3 in (1.91 m)	328 lb (149 kg)	4.9	Mar 18, 2011
Darren Lake; DT	Recruit ratings: Scout: Rivals: 247Sports: ESPN:					
Dillon Lee; LB	Buford, Georgia	Buford High School	6 ft 4 in (1.93 m)	220 lb (100 kg)	–	May 16, 2011
Dillon Lee; LB	Recruit ratings: Scout: Rivals: 247Sports: ESPN:					
Alec Morris; QB	Allen, Texas	Allen High School	6 ft 4 in (1.93 m)	235 lb (107 kg)	–	Aug 5, 2011
Alec Morris; QB	Recruit ratings: Scout: Rivals: 247Sports: ESPN:					
Reggie Ragland; MLB	Madison, Alabama	Bob Jones High School	6 ft 4 in (1.93 m)	245 lb (111 kg)	–	Dec 30, 2010
Reggie Ragland; MLB	Recruit ratings: Scout: Rivals: 247Sports: ESPN:					
Geno Smith; CB	Atlanta, Georgia	St. Pius X Catholic High School	6 ft 0 in (1.83 m)	165 lb (75 kg)	4.5	Aug 17, 2011
Geno Smith; CB	Recruit ratings: Scout: Rivals: 247Sports: ESPN:					
Alphonse Taylor; DT	Mobile, Alabama	Davidson High School	6 ft 6 in (1.98 m)	340 lb (150 kg)	–	Dec 23, 2011
Alphonse Taylor; DT	Recruit ratings: Scout: Rivals: 247Sports: ESPN:					
Dalvin Tomlinson; DT	McDonough, Georgia	Henry County High School	6 ft 3 in (1.91 m)	270 lb (120 kg)	4.9	Feb 1, 2012
Dalvin Tomlinson; DT	Recruit ratings: Scout: Rivals: 247Sports: ESPN:					
Eddie Williams; S	Panama City Beach, Florida	Arnold High School	6 ft 4 in (1.93 m)	205 lb (93 kg)	–	Aug 24, 2010
Eddie Williams; S	Recruit ratings: Scout: Rivals: 247Sports: ESPN:					
T. J. Yeldon; RB	Daphne, Alabama	Daphne High School	6 ft 2 in (1.88 m)	205 lb (93 kg)	4.4	Dec 18, 2011
T. J. Yeldon; RB	Recruit ratings: Scout: Rivals: 247Sports: ESPN:					
Overall recruit ranking: Scout: 2 Rivals: 1 ESPN: 1
‡ Refers to 40-yard dash; Note: In many cases, Scout, Rivals, 247Sports, On3, and ESPN may conflict in their listings of height, weight and 40 time.; In these cases, the average was taken. ESPN grades are on a 100-point scale.; Sources: "Scout.com Football Recruiting: Alabama". Scout.; "2012 Player Signees—Alabama". ESPN.; "Scout.com Team Recruiting Rankings". Scout.; "2012 Team Ranking". Rivals.com.

== Schedule ==
The 2012 schedule was officially released on December 28, 2011. With the addition of both Missouri and Texas A&M to the conference, the SEC abandoned its previous scheduling format to accommodate its expansion. As such, Alabama faced all six Western Division opponents: Arkansas, Auburn, LSU, Mississippi State, Ole Miss and Texas A&M. They also faced two Eastern Division opponents: official SEC rival Tennessee and Missouri. Alabama did not play SEC Eastern Division opponents Georgia, Kentucky, South Carolina, Florida or Vanderbilt as part of the regular season. Alabama also played four non-conference games: Michigan of the Big Ten Conference, Western Kentucky University (WKU) and Florida Atlantic of the Sun Belt Conference and Western Carolina of the Southern Conference. Alabama had their only bye week between their games against Ole Miss and Missouri.

With their victory over Auburn, Alabama won the SEC Western Division championship and qualified to play in the SEC Championship Game against Georgia. In the SEC Championship Game, Alabama defeated the Bulldogs 32–28 and captured their 23rd SEC championship in football. On December 2, the Crimson Tide qualified to play in the BCS National Championship Game against Notre Dame after they finished in the No. 2 position in the final BCS standings.

In addition to weekly television coverage, radio coverage for all games was broadcast statewide on The Crimson Tide Sports Network (CTSN). The radio announcers for the 2012 season were Eli Gold with play-by-play, Phil Savage with color commentary and Chris Stewart with sideline reports.

Date	Time	Opponent	Rank	Site	TV	Result	Attendance
September 1	7:00 p.m.	vs. No. 8 Michigan*	No. 2	Cowboys Stadium; Arlington, TX (Cowboys Classic) (College GameDay)	ABC	W 41–14	90,413
September 8	2:30 p.m.	Western Kentucky*	No. 1	Bryant–Denny Stadium; Tuscaloosa, AL	SECN	W 35–0	101,821
September 15	2:30 p.m.	at Arkansas	No. 1	Donald W. Reynolds Razorback Stadium; Fayetteville, AR	CBS	W 52–0	74,617
September 22	4:00 p.m.	Florida Atlantic*	No. 1	Bryant–Denny Stadium; Tuscaloosa, AL	PPV	W 40–7	101,821
September 29	8:15 p.m.	Ole Miss	No. 1	Bryant–Denny Stadium; Tuscaloosa, AL (rivalry)	ESPN	W 33–14	101,821
October 13	2:30 p.m.	at Missouri	No. 1	Faurot Field; Columbia, MO	CBS	W 42–10	71,004
October 20	6:00 p.m.	at Tennessee	No. 1	Neyland Stadium; Knoxville, TN (Third Saturday in October)	ESPN	W 44–13	102,455
October 27	7:45 p.m.	No. 11 Mississippi State^{†}	No. 1	Bryant–Denny Stadium; Tuscaloosa, AL (rivalry)	ESPN	W 38–7	101,821
November 3	7:00 p.m.	at No. 5 LSU	No. 1	Tiger Stadium; Baton Rouge, LA (rivalry) (College GameDay)	CBS	W 21–17	93,374
November 10	2:30 p.m.	No. 15 Texas A&M	No. 1	Bryant–Denny Stadium; Tuscaloosa, AL	CBS	L 24–29	101,821
November 17	11:21 a.m.	Western Carolina*	No. 4	Bryant–Denny Stadium; Tuscaloosa, AL	SECN	W 49–0	101,126
November 24	2:30 p.m.	Auburn	No. 2	Bryant–Denny Stadium; Tuscaloosa, AL (Iron Bowl)	CBS	W 49–0	101,821
December 1	4:00 p.m.	vs. No. 3 Georgia	No. 2	Georgia Dome; Atlanta, GA (SEC Championship Game / rivalry) (College GameDay)	CBS	W 32–28	75,624
January 7, 2013	7:30 p.m.	vs. No. 1 Notre Dame*	No. 2	Sun Life Stadium; Miami Gardens, FL (BCS National Championship Game) (College GameDay)	ESPN	W 42–14	80,120
*Non-conference game; ^{†}Homecoming; Rankings from AP Poll released prior to the game; All times are in Central time

- Schedule source:

== Game summaries ==
=== No. 8 Michigan ===
Cowboys Classic

Team	1	2	3	4	Total
#8 Michigan	0	7	7	0	14
• #2 Alabama	21	10	3	7	41

- Location: Arlington, Texas
- Game start: 7:12 p.m.
- Elapsed time: 3:14
- Game attendance: 90,413
- Game weather: Indoors
- Referee: Reggie Smith
- TV announcers (ABC): Brent Musburger (play-by-play), Kirk Herbstreit (color), Heather Cox (sideline)

Scoring summary
1	6:56	Alabama	Michael Williams two-yard pass from A. J. McCarron (Jeremy Shelley kick)	Alabama 7–0
1	4:59	Alabama	DeAndrew White 51-yard pass from A. J. McCarron (Jeremy Shelley kick)	Alabama 14–0
1	1:24	Alabama	Eddie Lacy nine-yard run (Jeremy Shelley kick)	Alabama 21–0
2	9:53	Alabama	Jeremy Shelley 22-yard field goal	Alabama 24–0
2	4:31	Alabama	C. J. Mosley 16-yard interception return (Jeremy Shelley kick)	Alabama 31–0
2	2:20	Michigan	Denard Robinson six-yard run (Brendan Gibbons kick)	Alabama 31–7
3	2:34	Alabama	Cade Foster 51-yard field goal	Alabama 34–7
3	0:14	Michigan	Devin Gardner 44-yard pass from Denard Robinson (Brendan Gibbons kick)	Alabama 34–14
4	5:32	Alabama	T. J. Yeldon one-yard run (Jeremy Shelley kick)	Alabama 41–14

On October 14, 2010, officials from both Alabama and the University of Michigan announced the Crimson Tide and Wolverines would meet to open the 2012 season in the Cowboys Classic at Arlington, Texas. In the game, Alabama took a 21–0 first quarter lead and defeated the Wolverines 41–14 to open the season.

Michigan won the coin toss and elected to defer to the second half, and Alabama opened play with a three-and-out. Michigan was then held to only one first down before they punted on their first possession. On the drive that ensued, Alabama's mix of play-action passes and rushes ended with a two-yard touchdown reception by Michael Williams from A. J. McCarron for a 7–0 lead. After the Crimson Tide defense again forced a Wolverine punt, on Alabama's next drive, McCarron connected with DeAndrew White for a 51-yard touchdown reception and a 14–0 lead. Michigan stalled on their next drive after Denard Robinson threw an interception to Dee Milliner who returned it to Michigan's 17-yard line. On third down, Eddie Lacy rushed nine yards into the end zone for a touchdown and a 21–0 lead at the end of the first quarter.

On their first possession of the second quarter, Alabama drove 61 yards to the Michigan five-yard line where Jeremy Shelly kicked a 22-yard field goal for a 24–0 lead. After each team traded punts on their next possessions, Robinson threw his second interception of the game. This time, C. J. Mosley returned the interception 16 yards for a touchdown and a 31–0 Crimson Tide lead. On the Wolverines' next drive, Robinson found a wide open Jeremy Gallon for a 71-yard pass completion to the Alabama one-yard line. Robinson then scored on a one-yard run to cut the score to 31–7. Alabama then ended the first half with a Lacy fumble that was recovered by Raymon Taylor as time expired with the Crimson Tide up 31–7 at halftime.

Michigan received the ball to start the second half, and in their opening drive, Robinson rushed for six yards and threw a 20-yard pass to Drew Dileo before Alabama's defense forced a punt. Alabama's next drive started strong with a 28-yard reception by Kevin Norwood and a pair of 14-yard runs by T. J. Yeldon. However, McCarron was sacked for a 16-yard loss and as a result, Cade Foster later missed a 52-yard field goal wide left. On the Michigan drive that ensued, the Wolverines stalled at around midfield, but Michigan elected to go for the first down on fourth and three. Robinson then rushed for what was initially ruled a three-yard first down, but later was overturned by video evidence that turned the ball over on downs. Alabama then drove to the Michigan 33-yard-line where Foster connected on a 51-yard field goal that extended the Crimson Tide lead to 34–7. The Wolverines responded on their next possession with their final points of the game after Robinson connected with Devin Gardner for a 44-yard touchdown reception to make the score 34–14 at the end of the third quarter. After each team again traded punts, on their second possession of the fourth quarter the Crimson Tide started at their own 43-yard-line. On the drive, Jalston Fowler rushed for 25 yards, McCarron passed to Kelly Johnson for 16 yards and Michigan was called for a 15-yard pass interference penalty to set up a one-yard touchdown run for Yeldon and a 41–14 Alabama lead. After this, Michigan and Alabama traded possessions without scoring, and on Michigan's last possession of the game, backup Michigan quarterback Russell Bellomy threw an interception to Alabama's Dillon Lee.

In the game, Yeldon became the first non-redshirted freshman to rush for 100 yards in his first game with the Crimson Tide. For their individual performances, Yeldon was named SEC Co-Freshman of the Week and Milliner was named both SEC and Walter Camp Foundation Defensive Player of the Week. The victory improved Alabama's all-time record against the Wolverines to 2–2.

=== WKU ===
Team	1	2	3	4	Total
WKU	0	0	0	0	0
• #1 Alabama	14	7	7	7	35

- Location: Tuscaloosa, Alabama
- Game start: 2:44 p.m.
- Elapsed time: 2:51
- Game attendance: 101,821
- Game weather: 80 °F (27 °C), mostly cloudy, winds NNW 10 mph (16 km/h)
- Referee: Matt Austin
- TV announcers (SEC Network): Mike Morgan (play-by-play), Chris Doering (color), Jill Montgomery (sideline)

Scoring summary
1	13:07	Alabama	Christion Jones 14-yard pass from A. J. McCarron (Jeremy Shelley kick)	Alabama 7–0
1	5:57	Alabama	Kevin Norwood 33-yard pass from A. J. McCarron (Jeremy Shelley kick)	Alabama 14–0
2	6:53	Alabama	Christion Jones 22-yard pass from A. J. McCarron (Jeremy Shelley kick)	Alabama 21–0
3	13:15	Alabama	Kevin Norwood 12-yard pass from A. J. McCarron (Jeremy Shelley kick)	Alabama 28–0
4	1:47	Alabama	Kenyan Drake 32-yard run (Jeremy Shelley kick)	Alabama 35–0

In the home opener for the 2012 season, Alabama shut out the Hilltoppers of Western Kentucky University (WKU) 35–0. To open the game, Alabama scored on a 14-yard A. J. McCarron touchdown pass to Christion Jones that capped a four-play, 72-yard drive. On the WKU drive that ensued, Nico Johnson forced a Marquis Sumler fumble that was recovered by Damion Square at the WKU 49-yard line. However, the Crimson Tide was unable to capitalize on the turnover after McCarron was sacked twice and were forced to punt. The defense responded on the next drive with their second recovered fumble of the game. This time, Adrian Hubbard caused the Antonio Andrews fumble that was recovered by Brandon Ivory at the WKU 33-yard line. On the next play, McCarron threw a 33-yard touchdown pass to Kevin Norwood for a 14–0 Crimson Tide lead.

Early in the second quarter, Xzavier Dickson sacked Kawaun Jakes and forced the third WKU fumble of the game; this time it was recovered by Vinnie Sunseri and returned to the Alabama 32-yard line. Seven plays later, Alabama took a 21–0 lead when Christion Jones caught a 22-yard McCarron touchdown pass. Each team then traded punts until halftime.

WKU opened the third quarter on offense, and three plays later Jakes threw an interception to Deion Belue that was returned to the Hilltoppers' 25-yard line. Two plays after a face mask penalty brought the ball to the 12-yard line, McCarron connected with Norwood for a 12-yard touchdown reception and a 28–0 lead. The teams again traded punts late into the fourth quarter when Kenyan Drake scored on a 32-yard run to cap a 12-play, 81-yard drive that made the final score 35–0.

In the game, Jones and Norwood became the first pair of Alabama receivers to each score a pair of touchdowns in the same game since three were caught by Al Lary and two by Ed Lary in the 1950 season. Late in the game, backup running back Jalston Fowler suffered a knee injury that sidelined him for the remainder of the season. The victory improved Alabama's all-time record against the Hilltoppers to 2–0.

=== Arkansas ===
Team	1	2	3	4	Total
• #1 Alabama	7	17	14	14	52
Arkansas	0	0	0	0	0

- Location: Fayetteville, Arkansas
- Game start: 2:39 p.m.
- Elapsed time: 3:08
- Game attendance: 74,617
- Game weather: 69 °F (21 °C), Overcast, winds WSW 3 mph (4.8 km/h)
- Referee: Matt Moore
- TV announcers (CBS): Verne Lundquist (play-by-play), Gary Danielson (color), Tracy Wolfson (sideline)

Scoring summary
1	9:40	Alabama	Eddie Lacy six-yard run (Jeremy Shelley kick)	Alabama 7–0
2	14:10	Alabama	Cade Foster 51-yard field goal	Alabama 10–0
2	8:58	Alabama	Amari Cooper 20-yard pass from A. J. McCarron (Jeremy Shelley kick)	Alabama 17–0
2	3:01	Alabama	Eddie Lacy one-yard run (Jeremy Shelley kick)	Alabama 24–0
3	12:10	Alabama	Eddie Lacy ten-yard run (Jeremy Shelley kick)	Alabama 31–0
3	11:27	Alabama	T. J. Yeldon one-yard run (Jeremy Shelley kick)	Alabama 38–0
4	11:32	Alabama	Kenyan Drake 12-yard run (Jeremy Shelley kick)	Alabama 45–0
4	5:33	Alabama	Blake Sims 27-yard run (Jeremy Shelley kick)	Alabama 52–0

In their first road game of the season at their opponents' home stadium, Alabama began conference play against the Arkansas Razorbacks at Fayetteville. During Arkansas's previous game against Louisiana–Monroe, the Razorbacks' starting quarterback Tyler Wilson suffered a concussion and as a result was not cleared by team doctors to play against Alabama. With Wilson out, redshirt freshman Brandon Allen made his first start at quarterback and the Crimson Tide had their second consecutive shutout in their 52–0 victory over Arkansas.

After each team traded punts on their first possessions, Arkansas long snapper Will Coleman snapped the ball over the head of punter Dylan Breeding that gave Alabama possession at the Razorbacks' six-yard line. On the next play, Eddie Lacy scored on a six-yard run for a 7–0 Crimson Tide lead. The Razorbacks responded with an eight-play, 51-yard drive, but failed to score any points after a 41-yard Zach Hocker field goal hit the left upright. Each team again traded punts before the Crimson Tide extended their lead to 10–0 early in the second quarter on a 51-yard Cade Foster field goal.

The Arkansas possession that ensued ended when Vinnie Sunseri intercepted a Brandon Allen pass. Six plays later, A. J. McCarron threw a 20-yard touchdown pass to Amari Cooper for a 17–0 lead. Later in the quarter, Ha'Sean Clinton-Dix intercepted another Allen pass and returned it to the three-yard line. Three plays later Lacy had his second touchdown of the game on a one-yard run and the Crimson Tide led at halftime 24–0.

Alabama opened the third quarter with a six-play, 75-yard drive that ended with a ten-yard Lacy touchdown run. On the kickoff that ensued, Demetrius Hart forced a fumble by Arkansas' Dennis Johnson that was recovered by Foster at the Razorbacks' 27-yard line. Two plays later, Alabama led 38–0 after T. J. Yeldon scored on a one-yard run. Arkansas responded with their longest drive of the game; however, it ended when Deion Belue forced a Knile Davis fumble that was recovered by Nick Perry at the Alabama 20-yard line. With the majority of the offensive starters pulled from the game, the Crimson Tide reserves led Alabama on a 15-play, 80-yard drive that ended with a 12-yard Kenyan Drake touchdown run early in the fourth quarter. The final touchdown of the game was set up late in the game after Knile Davis lost his second fumble of the game on a Jeoffrey Pagan tackle that was recovered by Denzel Devall. Two plays later, backup quarterback Blake Sims made the final score 52–0 with his 27-yard quarterback sneak for a touchdown.

The shutout was the first for Arkansas since their 28–0 loss to LSU in 1995 and was their first in Fayetteville since a 7–0 loss to Baylor in 1966. It also marked the first time Alabama had shut out opponents in consecutive weeks since the 1980 season. For his performance, Chance Warmack was named the SEC Offensive Lineman of the Week. The victory improved Alabama's all-time record against the Razorbacks to 13–8 (16–7 without NCAA vacations and forfeits).

=== Florida Atlantic ===
Team	1	2	3	4	Total
Florida Atlantic	0	0	0	7	7
• #1 Alabama	14	16	3	7	40

- Location: Tuscaloosa, Alabama
- Game start: 4:07 p.m.
- Elapsed time: 2:40
- Game attendance: 101,821
- Game weather: 86 °F (30 °C), Mostly sunny, Winds WNW 10 mph (16 km/h)
- Referee: Ken Williamson
- TV announcers (PPV): Chris Stewart (play-by-play), Tyler Watts (color), Tom Roberts (sideline)

Scoring summary
1	13:18	Alabama	Kenny Bell 85-yard pass from A. J. McCarron (Jeremy Shelley kick)	Alabama 7–0
1	6:12	Alabama	DeAndrew White four-yard pass from A. J. McCarron (Jeremy Shelley kick)	Alabama 14–0
2	14:49	Alabama	Cade Foster 52-yard field goal	Alabama 17–0
2	10:31	Alabama	Jeremy Shelley 26-yard field goal	Alabama 20–0
2	5:22	Alabama	Jeremy Shelley 30-yard field goal	Alabama 23–0
2	0:08	Alabama	Christion Jones four-yard pass from A. J. McCarron (Jeremy Shelley kick)	Alabama 30–0
3	8:26	Alabama	Cade Foster 46-yard field goal	Alabama 33–0
4	11:13	Alabama	Kenyan Drake eight-yard run (Jeremy Shelley kick)	Alabama 40–0
4	2:49	FAU	Alex Deleon six-yard pass from Graham Wilbert (Mitch Anderson kick)	Alabama 40–7

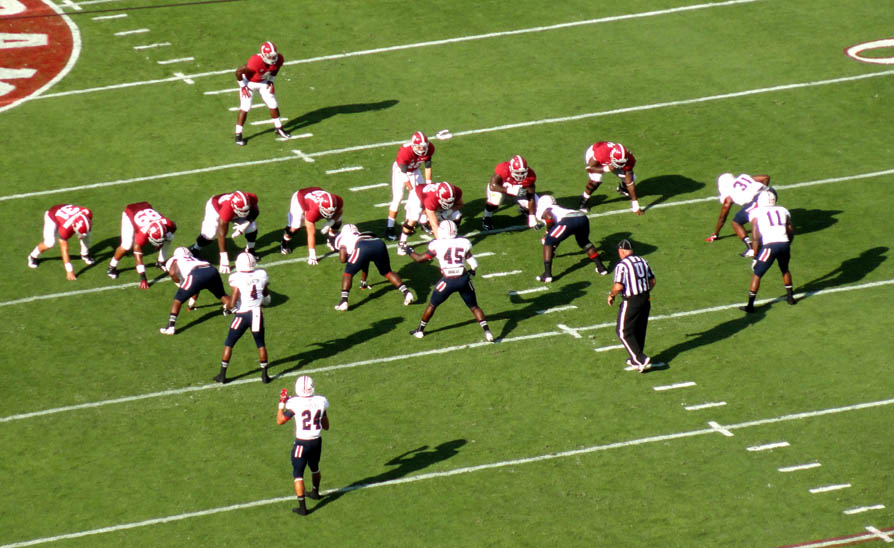
The Alabama offense set for a play in the first quarter

In their fourth game of the 2012 season, Alabama defeated the Florida Atlantic Owls in their first all-time meeting by a final score of 40–7. The Crimson Tide scored on the third play of their first offensive possession when A. J. McCarron connected with Kenny Bell for an 85-yard touchdown pass and an early 7–0 lead. After the Alabama defense held the Owls to a three-and-out on their first possession, the Crimson Tide took a 14–0 lead on their drive that ensued when McCarron threw a four-yard touchdown pass to DeAndrew White. After the defense again held FAU to a three-and-out, Christion Jones fumbled the punt that was recovered by the Owls' Tim Raber at the Alabama 25-yard line. After another defensive hold, Jesse Williams blocked the Vinny Zaccario field goal attempt to keep the score 14–0.

In the second quarter, the Crimson Tide scored on a 52-yard Cade Foster field goal and on field goals of 26 and 30 yards by Jeremy Shelley before McCarron threw a four-yard touchdown pass to Christion Jones to make the halftime score 30–0. The defense also dominated the quarter and did not allow FAU a single third down conversion during the period. In the third, Foster connected on a 46-yard field goal and early in the fourth quarter Kenyan Drake scored on an eight-yard touchdown run for a 40–0 lead. With the game in hand, Alabama played many of their backups in the second half. As such, late in the fourth quarter the Crimson Tide shutout streak that stretched back to the third quarter of their week one victory over Michigan ended when the Owls' Graham Wilbert threw a six-yard touchdown pass to Alex Deleon that made the final score 40–7.

In the game, Eddie Lacy rushed for 106 yards on 15 carries for his first 100-yard rushing game of the season. The late FAU touchdown ended the Alabama shutout streak at 192:25 minutes that stretched back to the 0:14 mark of the third quarter in their game against Michigan.

=== Ole Miss ===
Team	1	2	3	4	Total
Ole Miss	0	7	7	0	14
• #1 Alabama	6	21	0	6	33

- Location: Tuscaloosa, Alabama
- Game start: 8:26 p.m.
- Elapsed time: 3:15
- Game attendance: 101,821
- Game weather: 72 °F (22 °C), Overcast, Winds NNW at 3 mph (4.8 km/h)
- Referee: Penn Wagers
- TV announcers (ESPN): Joe Tessitore (play-by-play), Matt Millen (color), Jessica Mendoza (sideline)

Scoring summary
1	7:17	Alabama	Jeremy Shelley 38-yard field goal	Alabama 3–0
1	3:03	Alabama	Jeremy Shelley 38-yard field goal	Alabama 6–0
2	13:40	Ole Miss	Jeff Scott one-yard run (Bryson Rose kick)	Ole Miss 7–6
2	13:25	Alabama	Christion Jones 99-yard kickoff return (Jeremy Shelley kick)	Alabama 13–7
2	10:30	Alabama	Amari Cooper 16-yard pass from A. J. McCarron (Jeremy Shelley kick)	Alabama 20–7
2	1:37	Alabama	Amari Cooper 12-yard pass from A. J. McCarron (Jeremy Shelley kick)	Alabama 27–7
3	6:35	Ole Miss	Randall Mackey 12-yard run (Bryson Rose kick)	Alabama 27–14
4	12:19	Alabama	Jeremy Shelley 26-yard field goal	Alabama 30–14
4	1:41	Alabama	Jeremy Shelley 24-yard field goal	Alabama 33–14

Alabama played their first home conference game in their annual rivalry game, against the Ole Miss Rebels at Tuscaloosa. In the game, 21 second quarter points after the Rebels' briefly held a lead resulted in the 33–14 Crimson Tide victory. After each team traded punts on their first possessions, Jeremy Shelley connected on the first of four field goals from 38 yards out to give the Crimson Tide an early 3–0 lead. After Shelley made his second 38-yard field goal to extend the Alabama lead to 6–0, Ole Miss responded with a 13-play, 75-yard drive that culminated with a one-yard Jeff Scott touchdown run that gave the Rebels a 7–6 lead early in the second quarter. At the time the Rebels' took the lead, it marked the first time Alabama trailed in regulation since their 2011 game against Tennessee.

The Ole Miss lead only lasted for fifteen seconds, as Christion Jones scored a touchdown on the kickoff that ensued with his 99-yard return that gave the Crimson Tide a 13–7 lead. On the Rebels' next possession, Bo Wallace threw an interception to Dee Milliner, and four plays later A. J. McCarron threw a 16-yard touchdown pass to Amari Cooper that extended the Alabama lead to 20–7. On their next drive, Ole Miss was intercepted by the Crimson Tide on two separate occasions. First Robert Lester intercepted a Bo Wallace pass that he subsequently fumbled and was recovered by Scott, and then two plays later Randall Mackey threw an interception to Deion Belue at the Alabama 32-yard line. The Crimson Tide then drove 68 yards and took a 27–7 halftime lead after McCarron threw a 12-yard touchdown pass to Cooper.

Ole Miss scored the only points of the third quarter on a 12-yard Randall Mackey touchdown run that capped a 70-yard drive that saw the Rebels convert a pair of fourth downs. The final margin of 33–14 was provided by a pair of Shelley field goals from 26 and 24 yards in the fourth quarter. In the game, McCarron eclipsed Brody Croyle's team record of 190 consecutive pass attempts without throwing an interception. Starting wide receiver DeAndrew White and backup running back Demetrius Hart both suffered knee injuries during the course of the game that sidelined both of them for the remainder of the season. The victory improved Alabama's all-time record against the Rebels to 46–9–2 (50–8–2 without NCAA vacations and forfeits).

=== Missouri ===
Team	1	2	3	4	Total
• #1 Alabama	21	7	0	14	42
Missouri	0	7	3	0	10

- Location: Columbia, Missouri
- Game start: 2:39 p.m.
- Elapsed time: 3:36
- Game attendance: 71,004
- Game weather: 73 °F (23 °C), Overcast with rain, Winds SSE at 18 mph (29 km/h)
- Referee: Tom Ritter
- TV announcers (CBS): Verne Lundquist (play-by-play), Gary Danielson (color), Tracy Wolfson (sideline)

Scoring summary
1	14:15	Alabama	Eddie Lacy 73-yard run (Jeremy Shelley kick)	Alabama 7–0
1	6:07	Alabama	Eddie Lacy 3-yard run (Jeremy Shelley kick)	Alabama 14–0
1	1:42	Alabama	T. J. Yeldon 1-yard run (Jeremy Shelley kick)	Alabama 21–0
2	8:40	Alabama	T. J. Yeldon 15-yard run (Jeremy Shelley kick)	Alabama 28–0
2	8:24	Missouri	Marcus Murphy 98-yard kickoff return (Andrew Baggett kick)	Alabama 28–7
3	11:50	Missouri	Andrew Baggett 41-yard field goal	Alabama 28–10
4	8:05	Alabama	Eddie Lacy 1-yard run (Jeremy Shelley kick)	Alabama 35–10
4	2:28	Alabama	Kenyan Drake 3-yard run (Jeremy Shelley kick)	Alabama 42–10

In what was their first meeting since Alabama defeated the Tigers 38–28 during the 1978 season, and their first as conference foes, Alabama won 42–10 at Missouri on a stormy afternoon. The Crimson Tide opened the scoring on their second offensive play when Eddie Lacy had a 73-yard touchdown run for an early 7–0 Alabama lead. After each team traded punts, Vinnie Sunseri intercepted a Corbin Berkstresser pass that set up Alabama's second scoring drive from the 50-yard line. A. J. McCarron first had a 44-yard completion to Kenny Bell, and then Lacy scored his second touchdown of the afternoon on a three-yard run two plays later for a 14–0 lead. The third Crimson Tide touchdown of the first quarter was set up after Landon Collins blocked a Trey Barrow punt that was recovered at the Missouri 17-yard line. Three T. J. Yeldon runs later, Alabama led 21–0.

After a pair of Tiger possessions that ended with punts and an Alabama possession that ended with a lost fumble by McCarron, the Crimson Tide started their fourth scoring drive of the afternoon. The drive began with a 22-yard McCarron pass to Christion Jones and finished with a 15-yard Yeldon touchdown run. Immediately after Yeldon scored, the referees stopped the game temporarily and cleared the field due to lightning strikes in the immediate vicinity of the stadium. After a 40-minute stoppage, the game resumed with a Jeremy Shelley extra point and a Crimson Tide lead of 28–0. Missouri responded on the kickoff that ensued with their only touchdown of the afternoon on a 98-yard Marcus Murphy return that made the halftime score 28–7.

The Tigers opened the third quarter with a 41-yard Andrew Baggett field goal that cut the Crimson Tide lead to 28–10. Each team then traded punts through the fourth quarter after Lacy scored his third touchdown of the afternoon on a one-yard run that extended the Alabama lead to 35–10. The Crimson Tide defense then got their third turnover of the game on the next Tigers possession when a Berkstresser pass was intercepted by Blake Sims and returned to the Alabama 46-yard line. With the second string in the game, the final points were scored by Kenyan Drake on a three-yard run that made the final score 42–10. In the game, Lacey ran for 177 yards and Yeldon ran for 144 yards with a combined five touchdowns. The victory improved Alabama's all-time record against the Tigers to 2–2

=== Tennessee ===
Third Saturday in October

Team	1	2	3	4	Total
• #1 Alabama	7	16	7	14	44
Tennessee	3	7	0	3	13

- Location: Knoxville, Tennessee
- Game start: 7:05 p.m.
- Elapsed time: 3:03
- Game attendance: 102,455
- Game weather: 61 °F (16 °C), Mostly cloudy
- Referee: Penn Wagers
- TV announcers (ESPN): Brad Nessler (play-by-play), Todd Blackledge (color), Holly Rowe (sideline)

Scoring summary
1	8:18	Alabama	Amari Cooper 23-yard pass from A. J. McCarron (Jeremy Shelley kick)	Alabama 7–0
1	3:38	Tennessee	Michael Palardy 32-yard field goal	Alabama 7–3
2	11:23	Alabama	T. J. Yeldon 1-yard run (Jeremy Shelley kick failed)	Alabama 13–3
2	6:55	Alabama	Michael Williams 1-yard pass from A. J. McCarron (Jeremy Shelley kick)	Alabama 20–3
2	5:32	Tennessee	A. J. Johnson 2-yard run (Michael Palardy kick)	Alabama 20–10
2	1:24	Alabama	Jeremy Shelley 34-yard field goal	Alabama 23–10
3	2:56	Alabama	Amari Cooper 42-yard pass from A. J. McCarron (Jeremy Shelley kick)	Alabama 30–10
4	12:46	Alabama	Kenny Bell 39-yard pass from A. J. McCarron (Jeremy Shelley kick)	Alabama 37–10
4	9:07	Alabama	T. J. Yeldon 43-yard run (Jeremy Shelley kick)	Alabama 44–10
4	3:57	Tennessee	Michael Palardy 21-yard field goal	Alabama 44–13

In their annual rivalry game, Alabama defeated the Tennessee Volunteers at Knoxville 44–13 for their sixth consecutive victory in the series. After the teams traded punts to open the game, Alabama scored their first touchdown on their second possession on a 23-yard A. J. McCarron pass to Amari Cooper. The Volunteers responded on the drive that ensued with a 32-yard Michael Palardy field goal that cut the Crimson Tide lead to 7–3. After the next Alabama drive ended with a missed Cade Foster field goal from 44 yards, the Crimson Tide defense responded with their first turnover of the game when C. J. Mosley intercepted a Tyler Bray pass at the Tennessee 32-yard line. Four T. J. Yeldon runs and 32 yards later, Alabama led 13–3 after he scored on a one-yard touchdown run. The Crimson Tide extended their lead further to 20–3 on their next possession when Michael Williams scored on a one-yard McCarron pass that completed a drive that included a 54-yard Cooper reception. Tennessee responded on their next possession with their only touchdown of the evening on a two-yard A. J. Johnson run. Alabama then closed the half with a 34-yard Jeremy Shelley field goal for a 23–10 halftime lead.

The Crimson Tide opened the second half with a second missed Foster field goal, followed by each team again trading punts before the next Alabama points. The fourth Crimson Tide touchdown of the game came on a 42-yard McCarron pass to Cooper that extended the Alabama lead to 30–10. Tennessee advanced the ball to the Crimson Tide 21-yard line on their next possession before Robert Lester intercepted the second Bray pass of the evening for a touchback. Early in the fourth, Alabama extended their lead to 37–10 on a 39-yard McCarron pass to Kenny Bell. The Alabama defense then held the Volunteers on a fourth down to give the Crimson Tide possession at their 42-yard line. Three plays later, Yeldon scored on a 43-yard run for the final Alabama points and a 44–10 lead. Tennessee then scored the final points of the game on a 21-yard Palardy field goal that was set up after a Blake Sims fumble gave the Volunteers possession at the Alabama 24-yard line that made the final score 44–13.

Several Alabama players had career days with the performance on the field in Knoxville. McCarron had both career highs in passing yards and touchdowns with 306 and 4; Cooper established an Alabama freshman record for receiving yards with his 163 in the game. Yeldon also had his third 100-yard rushing game of the season with his 129 yards on 15 carries and 2 touchdowns. The victory improved Alabama's all-time record against the Volunteers to 49–38–7 (50–37–8 without NCAA vacations and forfeits).

=== No. 13 Mississippi State ===
Team	1	2	3	4	Total
#13 Miss State	0	0	0	7	7
• #1 Alabama	14	10	0	14	38

- Location: Tuscaloosa, Alabama
- Game start: 7:46 p.m.
- Elapsed time: 3:14
- Game attendance: 101,821
- Game weather: 54 °F (12 °C), Cloudy
- Referee: Ken Williamson
- TV announcers (ESPN): Brad Nessler (play-by-play), Todd Blackledge (color), Holly Rowe (sideline)

Scoring summary
1	10:28	Alabama	T. J. Yeldon 11-yard run (Jeremy Shelley kick)	Alabama 7–0
1	3:27	Alabama	Kenny Bell 57-yard pass from A. J. McCarron (Jeremy Shelley kick)	Alabama 14–0
2	13:33	Alabama	Michael Williams 9-yard pass from A. J. McCarron (Jeremy Shelley kick)	Alabama 21–0
2	0:52	Alabama	Jeremy Shelley 34-yard field goal	Alabama 24–0
4	13:06	Alabama	Eddie Lacy 27-yard pass from Phillip Ely (Jeremy Shelley kick)	Alabama 31–0
4	8:14	Alabama	Kenyan Drake 3-yard run (Jeremy Shelley kick)	Alabama 38–0
4	4:39	Miss State	Robert Johnson 2-yard pass from Dak Prescott (Devon Bell kick)	Alabama 38–7

In their annual rivalry game, Alabama defeated the Mississippi State Bulldogs at Tuscaloosa on homecoming 38–7. The Crimson Tide led 21–0 early in the second quarter after they scored touchdowns on their first three offensive possessions. They opened the game with a 41-yard Cyrus Jones kickoff return that set up a 59-yard drive that ended with an 11-yard T. J. Yeldon touchdown run. After Dee Milliner blocked a Devon Bell field goal attempt, the Crimson Tide took possession and six plays later led 14–0 on a 57-yard A. J. McCarron touchdown pass to Kenny Bell. The Alabama defense then forced their first punt of the game, and for the third time in three possessions the Crimson Tide scored a touchdown on a nine-yard McCarron pass to Michael Williams for a 21–0 lead. Each team then traded three-and-outs until nearly the end of the second quarter when Alabama was able to convert a 34-yard Jeremy Shelley field goal for a 24–0 halftime lead.

After each team traded punts to open the third quarter, the Bulldogs sustained their longest drive of the game. They drove 97 yards in 16 plays, but Tyler Russell threw a pass that was intercepted by Robert Lester in the endzone for a touchback that halted the drive. On the Alabama drive that ensued, State managed to force a punt, however it was fumbled by Deontae Skinner that gave the Crimson Tide possession at the Bulldogs' 28-yard line early in the fourth quarter. Three plays later, Phillip Ely threw his first career touchdown pass to Eddie Lacy from 27 yards for a 31–0 Alabama lead. On the kickoff that ensued, Christion Jones forced a Jameon Lewis fumble that was recovered by Landon Collins at the State 43-yard line, and eight plays later Alabama led 38–0 on a three-yard Kenyan Drake touchdown run. With the Crimson Tide reserves in on defense, the Bulldogs did manage to break up the shutout bid late in the fourth quarter when State scored their lone points on a two-yard Dak Prescott touchdown pass to Robert Johnson and made the final score 38–7. The victory improved Alabama's all-time record against the Bulldogs to 75–18–3 (77–17–3 without NCAA vacations and forfeits).

=== No. 5 LSU ===
Team	1	2	3	4	Total
• #1 Alabama	0	14	0	7	21
#5 LSU	3	0	7	7	17

- Location: Baton Rouge, Louisiana
- Game start: 7:13 p.m.
- Elapsed time: 3:34
- Game attendance: 93,374
- Game weather: 75 °F (24 °C), 52% humidity, winds S 5 mph (8.0 km/h)
- Referee: Hubert Owens
- TV announcers (CBS): Verne Lundquist (play-by-play), Gary Danielson (color), Tracy Wolfson (sideline)

Scoring summary
1	6:11	LSU	Drew Alleman 38-yard field goal	LSU 3–0
2	8:17	Alabama	Eddie Lacy 7-yard run (Jeremy Shelley kick)	Alabama 7–3
2	0:11	Alabama	A. J. McCarron 9-yard run (Jeremy Shelley kick)	Alabama 14–3
3	3:35	LSU	Jeremy Hill 1-yard run (Drew Alleman kick)	Alabama 14–10
4	12:58	LSU	Jarvis Landry 14-yard pass from Zach Mettenberger (Drew Alleman kick)	LSU 17–14
4	0:51	Alabama	T. J. Yeldon 28-yard pass from A. J. McCarron (Jeremy Shelley kick)	Alabama 21–17

In their annual rivalry game, Alabama trailed the LSU Tigers 17–14 with only 1:34 remaining in the game. The Crimson Tide then went on a five-play, 72-yard drive, capped by a 28-yard A. J. McCarron touchdown pass to T. J. Yeldon with only 0:51 left, and defeated LSU 21–17 at Baton Rouge.

After each team traded punts on their first possessions, LSU took a 3–0 first quarter lead when Drew Alleman connected on a 38-yard field goal. After each team again traded punts, Alabama scored the first touchdown of the game early in the second quarter. A seven-yard Eddie Lacy touchdown run completed an 11-play, 92-yard drive and gave the Crimson Tide a 7–3 lead. On the LSU possession that ensued, the Alabama defense held the Tigers to a three-and-out. However, Cyrus Jones fumbled the Brad Wing punt that was recovered by LSU at the Crimson Tide 36-yard line. LSU then failed to capitalize on the turnover as Alleman was tackled for a two-yard loss on a fake field goal attempt and gave Alabama possession at their 33-yard-line. After another Alabama punt and a missed 54-yard Alleman field goal, the Crimson Tide took a 14–3 halftime lead on a nine-yard McCarron touchdown run with only 0:11 left in the half.

After a series of punts to open the third quarter, LSU scored their first touchdown on a one-yard Jeremy Hill run that cut the Alabama lead to 14–10. On the kickoff that ensued, a failed onside kick gave the Crimson Tide possession at the Tigers' 44-yard line. The drive stalled at the 10-yard line when a Yeldon fumble was recovered by Sam Montgomery. LSU responded with a seven-play, 90-yard drive and took a 17–14 lead when Jarvis Landry caught a 14-yard touchdown pass from Zach Mettenberger early in the fourth quarter. The next four possessions included a pair of three-and-outs for Alabama and LSU drives that stalled on a failed fourth-down conversion and a missed 45-yard Alleman field goal, before the Tide went on their game-winning drive. With only 1:34 left in the game, Alabama took possession at their own 28-yard line. McCarron then completed three consecutive passes to Kevin Norwood and moved the ball to the LSU 28-yard line. After an incompletion to Norwood, the game-winning touchdown was scored when McCarron threw a short screen pass to Yeldon that he took 28 yards to score and create a 21–17 lead. After a pair of short passes, the game ended when Mettenberger was sacked by Damion Square as time expired.

For his 12-tackle performance in the game, Adrian Hubbard was named the SEC Defensive Player of the Week. The victory improved Alabama's all-time record against the Tigers to 47–25–5.

=== No. 15 Texas A&M ===
Team	1	2	3	4	Total
• #15 Texas A&M	20	0	0	9	29
#1 Alabama	0	14	3	7	24

- Location: Tuscaloosa, Alabama
- Game start: 2:46 p.m.
- Elapsed time: 3:29
- Game attendance: 101,821
- Game weather: 72 °F (22 °C), Sunny skies
- Referee: Tom Ritter
- TV announcers (CBS): Verne Lundquist (play-by-play), Gary Danielson (color), Tracy Wolfson (sideline)

Scoring summary
1	10:34	Texas A&M	Christine Michael 1-yard run (Taylor Bertolet kick)	Texas A&M 7–0
1	7:59	Texas A&M	Ryan Swope 10-yard pass from Johnny Manziel (Taylor Bertolet kick)	Texas A&M 14–0
1	0:41	Texas A&M	Christine Michael 1-yard run (Taylor Bertolet kick no good)	Texas A&M 20–0
2	10:04	Alabama	T. J. Yeldon 2-yard run (Jeremy Shelley kick)	Texas A&M 20–7
2	0:19	Alabama	Eddie Lacy 2-yard run (Jeremy Shelley kick)	Texas A&M 20–14
3	4:56	Alabama	Jeremy Shelley 28-yard field goal	Texas A&M 20–17
4	14:16	Texas A&M	Taylor Bertolet 29-yard field goal	Texas A&M 23–17
4	8:37	Texas A&M	Malcome Kennedy 24-yard pass from Johnny Manziel (Two-point conversion failed)	Texas A&M 29–17
4	6:09	Alabama	Amari Cooper 54-yard pass from A. J. McCarron (Jeremy Shelley kick)	Texas A&M 29–24

In their first meeting as conference foes, Alabama was upset by the Texas A&M Aggies in Tuscaloosa 29–24. After the Crimson Tide opened with a three-and-out, A&M scored on their first possession, aided by a 29-yard run by quarterback Johnny Manziel, on a one-yard Christine Michael touchdown run for a 7–0 lead. On their next possession, the tide reached their own- 48, but A. J. McCarron threw his first interception of the season to Sean Porter. Four plays later the Aggies led 14–0 after Manziel nearly fumbled, rolled out and found Ryan Swope wide open for a 10-yard touchdown pass. The A&M defense then held Alabama to their second three-and-out. The Aggies increased their lead to 20–0 late in the first when Michael scored on his second one-yard touchdown run that completed a 14-play, 73-yard drive. Once again, Manziel broke containment with a 32-yard run to the Alabama- 27 on 3rd-and-6.

The Crimson Tide finally responded with a 13-play, 75-yard drive, including a 4th-and-4 conversion with a 4-yard catch by Eddie Lacy, to score on a 2-yard touchdown run by T. J. Yeldon. A&M appeared primed to continue their scoring barrage, but turned the ball over on downs at the Alabama 32-yard line. Taking over at their own- 33, an 18-yard completion from McCarron to Christion Jones and an 18-yard run by Lacy moved the ball to the A&M −31. Six plays later, Lacy scored on a 2-yard touchdown run, trimming the deficit to 20–14 at halftime. On their second possession of the second half, Alabama stormed all the way to the A&M 11-yard line, but had to settle for a 28-yard Jeremy Shelley field goal that made the score 20–17 as the teams entered the fourth quarter. In the fourth, finishing the drive following Shelley's field goal, Taylor Bertolet connected on a 29-yard field goal, extending their slim lead to 23–17. Following an Alabama three-and-out, A&M had a chance to put the game away, but Bertolet missed one from 37 yards out. On the drive that ensued, McCarron connected with Amari Cooper for a 50-yard gain into A&M territory, but on the very next play Yeldon lost a fumble. Manziel completed a 42-yard pass to Swope and then a 24-yard touchdown pass to Malcome Kennedy for a 29–17 lead following a missed two-point conversion. Alabama responded on their next possession. Starting at their own- 6, Alabama reached their own −46, then a 54-yard McCarron touchdown pass to Cooper to cut the Aggies lead to 29–24. After the defense forced a punt, McCarron hit Kenny Bell for a 54-yard gain to the A&M 6-yard line. On 3rd-and-goal from the −5, a broken play turned into a 3-yard gain after a crazy McCarron scramble. However, on 4th-and-goal, McCarron threw an interception that gave A&M possession at the Aggies' four-yard line. On the possession that ensued, the Alabama defense forced an Aggies punt with 0:40 left in the game, but an offside call on Alabama gave the Aggies a first down and sealed their 29–24 victory. The loss brought Alabama's all-time record against the Aggies to 3–2.

=== Western Carolina ===
Team	1	2	3	4	Total
Western Carolina	0	0	0	0	0
• #4 Alabama	21	21	7	0	49

- Location: Tuscaloosa, Alabama
- Game start: 11:22 a.m.
- Elapsed time: 2:43
- Game attendance: 101,126
- Game weather: 56 °F (13 °C), Sunny skies
- Referee: Matt Austin
- TV announcers (SEC Network): Mike Morgan (play-by-play), Chris Doering (color), Jill Montgomery (sideline)

Scoring summary
1	12:06	Alabama	Eddie Lacy 7-yard run (Jeremy Shelley kick)	Alabama 7–0
1	7:58	Alabama	T. J. Yeldon 3-yard run (Jeremy Shelley kick)	Alabama 14–0
1	4:10	Alabama	Eddie Lacy 7-yard run (Jeremy Shelley kick)	Alabama 21–0
2	8:15	Alabama	Christion Jones 29-yard pass from A. J. McCarron (Jeremy Shelley kick)	Alabama 28–0
2	3:02	Alabama	Eddie Lacy 3-yard run (Jeremy Shelley kick)	Alabama 35–0
2	0:14	Alabama	Deion Belue 57-yard run fumble return (Jeremy Shelley kick)	Alabama 42–0
3	7:15	Alabama	Blake Sims 5-yard run (Jeremy Shelley kick)	Alabama 49–0

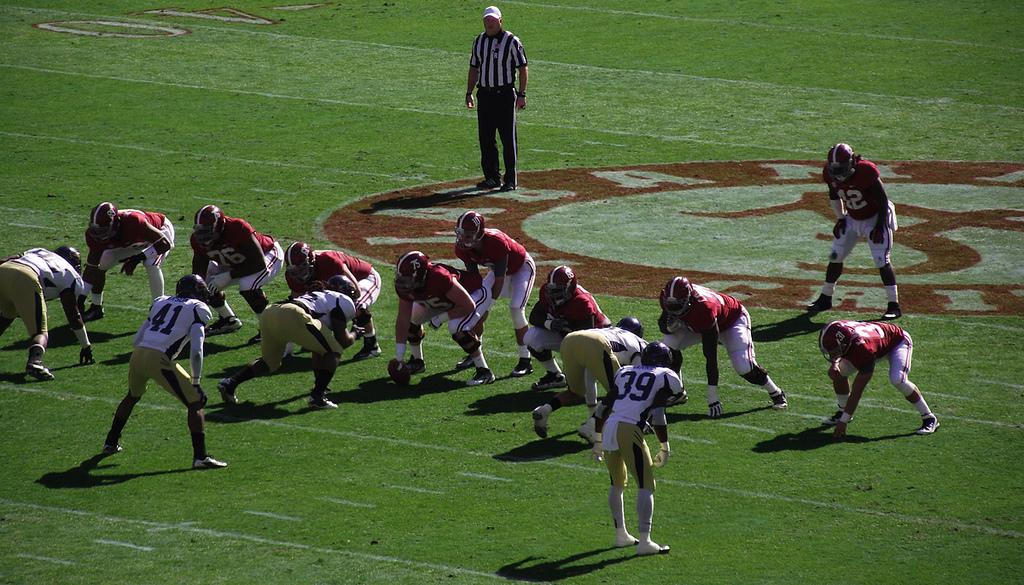
The Alabama offense set for a play at midfield

In the final non-conference game the 2012 season, Alabama shut out the Western Carolina Catamounts 49–0 in Tuscaloosa. The Crimson Tide scored three touchdowns in each of the first two quarters and took a 42–0 halftime lead. Alabama took the opening possession 62 yards in six plays and Eddie Lacy scored the first touchdown on a seven-yard run for a 7–0 lead. After the defense held the Catamounts to a three-and-out, T. J. Yeldon scored the second Crimson Tide touchdown on a three-yard run for a 14–0 lead. After a second three-and-out, Alabama scored its third touchdown in three possession on Lacy's second seven-yard touchdown run for a 21–0 lead at the end of the first quarter.

To open the second quarter, the Crimson Tide went four-for-four on touchdowns when A. J. McCarron connected on a 29-yard pass to Christion Jones for a 28–0 lead. Up by four touchdowns, backup quarterback Blake Sims took over for McCarron and led Alabama to their fifth touchdown in as many possessions and Lacy scored on a three-yard run, his third touchdown of the afternoon. After the defense again held Carolina to another three-and-out, Christion Jones fumbled the Catamounts' punt to give them possession at the Alabama 29-yard line. However, Western was unable to capitalize on the turnover as a Troy Mitchell fumble was recovered by Deion Belue and returned 57 yards for a touchdown and a 42–0 halftime lead. With reserves playing on both offense and defense for the Crimson Tide in the second half, the final touchdown came in the third quarter when Blake Sims scored on a five-yard run to make the final score 49–0. The victory improved Alabama's all-time record against the Catamounts to 2–0 (3–0 without NCAA vacations).This was the first time that Bryant–Denny Stadium was not sold out for an Alabama game since 2002.

=== Auburn ===
Iron Bowl

Team	1	2	3	4	Total
Auburn	0	0	0	0	0
• #2 Alabama	14	28	7	0	49

- Location: Tuscaloosa, Alabama
- Game start: 2:30 p.m.
- Elapsed time: 3:09
- Game attendance: 101,821
- Game weather: 53 °F (12 °C), Sunny skies, Winds NW 8 mph (13 km/h)
- Referee: Matt Moore
- TV announcers (CBS): Verne Lundquist (play-by-play), Gary Danielson (color), Tracy Wolfson (sideline)

Scoring summary
1	11:07	Alabama	Eddie Lacy 2-yard run (Jeremy Shelley kick)	Alabama 7–0
1	5:01	Alabama	T. J. Yeldon 2-yard run (Jeremy Shelley kick)	Alabama 14–0
2	12:38	Alabama	Amari Cooper 37-yard pass from A. J. McCarron (Jeremy Shelley kick)	Alabama 21–0
2	8:39	Alabama	Kevin Norwood 7-yard pass from A. J. McCarron (Jeremy Shelley kick)	Alabama 28–0
2	4:43	Alabama	Eddie Lacy 1-yard run (Jeremy Shelley kick)	Alabama 35–0
2	0:31	Alabama	Amari Cooper 29-yard pass from A. J. McCarron (Jeremy Shelley kick)	Alabama 42–0
3	9:03	Alabama	Kevin Norwood 38-yard pass from A. J. McCarron (Jeremy Shelley kick)	Alabama 49–0

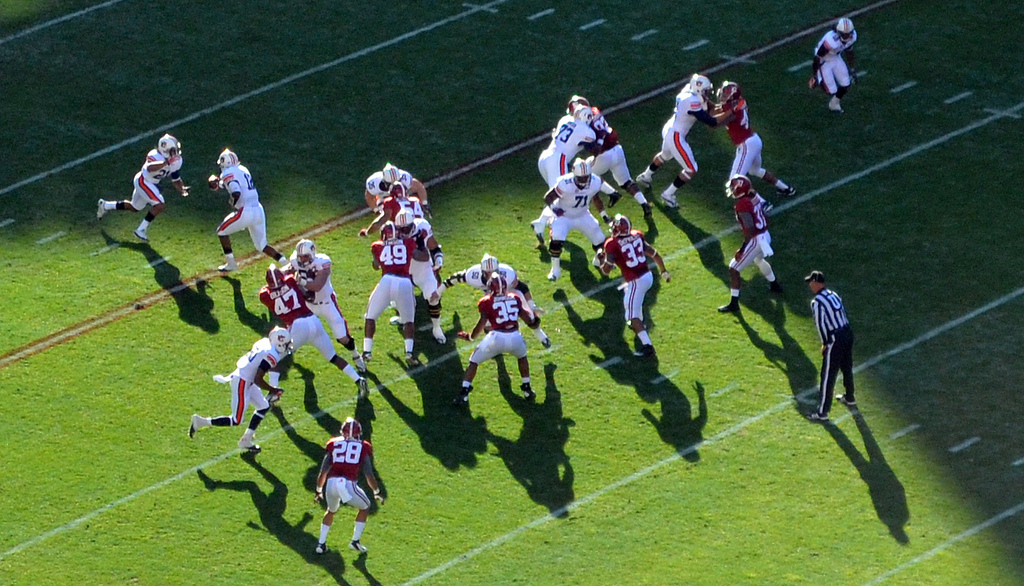
The Alabama defense in motion against the Tigers' offense

In the 2012 edition of the Iron Bowl, Alabama shut out the Auburn Tigers 49–0 at Tuscaloosa. The Crimson Tide opened the game with a 10-play, 75-yard drive that culminated in a two-yard Eddie Lacy touchdown run and a 7–0 lead. After the Alabama defense held Auburn to a three-and-out on their first possession, their offense responded with their second touchdown of the afternoon on a two-yard T. J. Yeldon touchdown run for a 14–0 lead. The Crimson Tide then forced a Tigers' punt on their second possession, and then scored their third touchdown in as many possessions when A. J. McCarron threw a 37-yard pass to Amari Cooper for a 21–0 lead early in the second quarter.

On the Auburn possession that ensued, the Alabama defense collected their first turnover of the game when Robert Lester intercepted a Jonathan Wallace pass at the Tigers' 29-yard line. Five plays later the Crimson Tide led 28–0 after McCarron threw a seven-yard touchdown pass to Kevin Norwood. The Alabama defense held Auburn to their second three-and-out of the game, and then the Crimson Tide scored their fifth touchdown of the game on a one-yard Lacy run for a 35–0 lead. Auburn then committed their second turnover of the game when Nico Johnson forced a Tre Mason fumble that Dee Milliner recovered and returned to the Tigers' 35-yard line. Alabama then took a 42–0 halftime lead when McCarron threw a 29-yard touchdown pass to Cooper.

With the Alabama starters in the game for the first possession of the second half, the defense again held the Tigers to a three-and-out and forced a punt. The offense then made it seven-for-seven on offense when McCarron threw a 38-yard touchdown pass to Norwood for a 49–0 lead. The Alabama defense then did not allow Auburn to get past their own 41-yard line for the duration of the game and secured their fourth shutout of the season. The victory was the second largest in the history of the Iron Bowl after the 55–0 Alabama win in 1948 and improved Alabama's all-time record against the Tigers to 42–34–1.

=== No. 3 Georgia ===
SEC Championship Game

Team	1	2	3	4	Total
• #2 Alabama	0	10	8	14	32
#3 Georgia	0	7	14	7	28

- Location: Atlanta, Georgia
- Game start: 4:11 p.m.
- Elapsed time: 3:42
- Game attendance: 75,624
- Game weather: Indoors
- Referee: Tom Ritter
- TV announcers (CBS): Verne Lundquist (play-by-play), Gary Danielson (color), Tracy Wolfson (sideline)

Scoring summary
2	13:59	Georgia	Jay Rome 19-yard pass from Aaron Murray (Marshall Morgan kick)	Georgia 7–0
2	1:59	Alabama	Eddie Lacy 41-yard run (Jeremy Shelley kick)	7–7
2	0:00	Alabama	Jeremy Shelley 22-yard field goal	Alabama 10–7
3	12:09	Georgia	Todd Gurley 3-yard run (Marshall Morgan kick)	Georgia 14–10
3	6:31	Georgia	Alec Ogletree 55-yard blocked field goal return (Marshall Morgan kick)	Georgia 21–10
3	4:19	Alabama	T. J. Yeldon 10-yard run (Two-point conversion good)	Georgia 21–18
4	14:57	Alabama	Eddie Lacy 1-yard run (Jeremy Shelley kick)	Alabama 25–21
4	12:54	Georgia	Todd Gurley 10-yard run (Marshall Morgan kick)	Georgia 28–25
4	3:15	Alabama	Amari Cooper 44-yard pass from A. J. McCarron (Jeremy Shelley kick)	Alabama 32–28

With their victory over Auburn in the Iron Bowl, Alabama clinched the SEC Western Division championship and qualified to play Georgia in the 2012 SEC Championship Game where they defeated the Bulldogs 32–28. After each team traded punts on their opening possessions, Christian Robinson recovered an A. J. McCarron fumble for the Bulldogs and gave Georgia possession at the Alabama 40-yard line. The Crimson Tide defense then held the Bulldogs to a 50-yard field goal attempt that was missed by Marshall Morgan that kept the game scoreless.

After the first quarter ended in a scoreless tie, Georgia scored their first touchdown early in the second quarter. The 19-yard touchdown pass from Aaron Murray to Jay Rome was set up by a fake punt earlier in the drive that gave the Bulldogs a 7–0 lead. After each team again traded punts, Alabama drove the ball to the Bulldogs' one-yard line. However, Eddie Lacy fumbled on second down and then McCarron threw an interception in the endzone to Sanders Commings to end the drive. The Crimson Tide forced another punt on the next Bulldogs possession and Alabama responded on the drive that ensued with their first touchdown of the game on a 41-yard Lacy run that tied the game 7–7. On the next drive, Ha'Sean Clinton-Dix intercepted a Murray pass and returned it to the Georgia 47-yard line with just over 1:00 left in the half. Five plays later, Jeremy Shelley connected on a 22-yard field goal as time expired and gave the Crimson Tide a 10–7 halftime lead.

Down by three to start the second half, Georgia responded with a pair of touchdowns and took a 21–10 lead early in the third quarter. The first was scored on a three-yard Todd Gurley run that completed a 75-yard drive that opened the quarter. The second came on a special teams play on the drive that ensued, when Cornelius Washington blocked a 49-yard Cade Foster field goal attempt that was recovered by Alec Ogletree and returned 55 yards for a touchdown and a 21–10 lead. Alabama responded on their next possession with a four-play, 77-yard drive that was capped by a 10-yard T. J. Yeldon touchdown run followed with Yeldon converting the two-point conversion on a two-yard run and made the score 21–18. After a Georgia three-and-out, Alabama took a 25–21 lead on the first play of the fourth quarter on a one-yard Lacy touchdown run behind the blocking of Jesse Williams.

Georgia responded with a 10-yard Gurley touchdown run on the next drive and took a 28–25 lead. Each team then again traded punts before Alabama scored what proved to be the game-winning touchdown on a 44-yard McCarron pass to Amari Cooper for a 32–28 lead. Each team then forced three-and-outs, and with just over one minute left in the game, Georgia drove to the Alabama eight-yard line on a drive that saw several long Murray completions and an overturned interception by Dee Milliner. The final play of the game was a Murray pass tipped by C. J. Mosley and caught by Chris Conley at the Alabama five-yard line, but Georgia did not have any time-outs remaining and the clock ran out to give Alabama the 32–28 victory. In the game Lacy rushed for 181 yards and Yeldon rushed for 153 yards and Lacy was named the SEC Championship Game MVP for his performance. The victory improved Alabama's all-time record against the Bulldogs to 37–25–4.

=== No. 1 Notre Dame ===
Discover BCS National Championship Game

Team	1	2	3	4	Total
• #2 Alabama	14	14	7	7	42
#1 Notre Dame	0	0	7	7	14

- Location: Miami Gardens, Florida
- Game start: 8:30 p.m.
- Elapsed time: 3:10
- Game attendance: 80,120
- Game weather: 73 °F (23 °C), Mostly cloudy, Winds NE 5 mph (8.0 km/h)
- Referee: Land Clark (Pac-12)
- TV announcers (ESPN): Brent Musburger (play-by-play), Kirk Herbstreit (color), Heather Cox & Tom Rinaldi (sideline)

Scoring summary
1	12:03	Alabama	Eddie Lacy 20-yard run (Jeremy Shelley kick)	Alabama 7–0
1	6:14	Alabama	Michael Williams 3-yard pass from A. J. McCarron (Jeremy Shelley kick)	Alabama 14–0
2	14:56	Alabama	T. J. Yeldon 1-yard run (Jeremy Shelley kick)	Alabama 21–0
2	0:31	Alabama	Eddie Lacy 11-yard pass from A. J. McCarron (Jeremy Shelley kick)	Alabama 28–0
3	7:34	Alabama	Amari Cooper 34-yard pass from A. J. McCarron (Jeremy Shelley kick)	Alabama 35–0
3	4:08	Notre Dame	Everett Golson 2-yard run (Kyle Brindza kick)	Alabama 35–7
4	11:27	Alabama	Amari Cooper 19-yard pass from A. J. McCarron (Jeremy Shelley kick)	Alabama 42–7
4	7:51	Notre Dame	Theo Riddick 6-yard pass from Everett Golson (Kyle Brindza kick)	Alabama 42–14

With their victory over Georgia in the SEC Championship Game, Alabama qualified for the 2013 BCS National Championship Game, and against Notre Dame the Crimson Tide captured their third BCS Championship in four years with a 42–14 victory over the Fighting Irish. After Notre Dame won the coin toss and elected to defer until the second half, Alabama took their opening possession 82 yards in five plays and Eddie Lacy gave the Crimson Tide an early 7–0 lead with his 20-yard touchdown run. On the first Irish possession that followed, the Crimson Tide held them to a three-and-out and forced a punt. The kick was subsequently fumbled by Christion Jones and recovered by Notre Dame; however, a kick catching interference penalty was called against the Irish and gave back possession to Alabama. On the drive that ensued, the Crimson Tide took a 14–0 lead when A. J. McCarron threw a three-yard touchdown pass to Michael Williams that capped a 10-play, 61-yard drive. After the Alabama defense forced their second punt of the game, the Crimson Tide responded with their third touchdown of the game.

Alabama stormed 80 yards and T. J. Yeldon extended the Alabama lead to 21–0 with his one-yard run on the first play of the second quarter. Notre Dame then responded with their longest play from scrimmage of the game on a 31-yard Everett Golson pass to DaVaris Daniels. However, the Irish then surrendered the ball on downs when they failed to convert on fourth-and-five four plays later. Each team then traded punts over the next four possessions before the Crimson Tide scored their final points of the first half. With just 0:31 left in the quarter, McCarron threw an 11-yard touchdown pass to Lacy that made the halftime score 28–0.

Notre Dame opened the third quarter on offense, but Ha'Sean Clinton-Dix intercepted a Golson pass that gave Alabama possession at their own three-yard line. The Crimson Tide then drove 97 yards in ten plays that ended with a 34-yard McCarron touchdown pass to Amari Cooper that extended their lead to 35–0. Notre Dame then responded with their first points of the game on the drive that ensued with a two-yard Golson touchdown run that made the score 35–7. Alabama then began their final scoring drive of the night. The final Crimson Tide touchdown came early in the fourth quarter on a 19-yard McCarron touchdown pass to Cooper that capped a 14-play, 86-yard drive that took 7:41 off the clock and made the score 42–7. The Irish then made the final score 42–14 when Golson threw a six-yard touchdown pass to Theo Riddick. The teams then traded punts with the final play of the game being a short Notre Dame run as time expired.

For their performances on the field, Lacy was named the game's offensive MVP and C. J. Mosley was named defensive MVP. In the game, Lacy rushed for 140 and Yeldon for 108 yards and each scored a touchdown in the win. McCarron became Alabama's all-time leader in touchdown passes when he surpassed the previous record of 47 set by John Parker Wilson. Cooper also set the single season record for touchdown receptions in a season after he caught a pair to give him 11 for the season and surpassed the previous record of 10 caught by Al Lary in 1955. The victory improved Alabama's all-time record against the Fighting Irish to 2–5.

== Rankings ==
Entering the 2012 season, the Crimson Tide was ranked No. 2 in both the AP and Coaches' Preseason Polls. After their 41–14 victory over Michigan to open the season, Alabama moved into the No. 1 position in both polls on September 4. When the first BCS rankings were unveiled on October 14, the Crimson Tide were in the No. 1 position. Alabama remained in first place in all the major polls through their loss to Texas A&M on November 10 when they dropped to No. 4 in the AP, Harris and BCS standings and to No. 5 in the Coaches' poll. Prior to the loss, the ten weeks spent as the No. 1 team in the AP Poll set a school record for consecutive weeks ranked No. 1. The week after the loss to A&M, the Crimson Tide moved up into the No. 2 position as a result of upset losses for both Kansas State and Oregon on November 17. On December 2, the final BCS rankings were released with the Crimson Tide in the No. 2 position to qualify for the BCS National Championship Game. After their victory over Notre Dame in the BCS National Championship Game, Alabama finished in the No. 1 position unanimously in both the AP and Coaches' polls as consensus national champions.

Ranking movements Legend: ██ Increase in ranking ██ Decrease in ranking ( ) = First-place votes
	Week															
Poll	Pre	1	2	3	4	5	6	7	8	9	10	11	12	13	14	Final
AP	2 (17)	1 (45)	1 (48)	1 (58)	1 (59)	1 (60)	1 (60)	1 (60)	1 (59)	1 (60)	1 (60)	4	2	2	2	1 (59)
Coaches	2 (20)	1 (37)	1 (42)	1 (54)	1 (57)	1 (57)	1 (58)	1 (59)	1 (59)	1 (59)	1 (59)	5	2 (2)	2 (2)	2 (3)	1 (56)
Harris	Not released						1 (108)	1 (110)	1 (109)	1 (109)	1 (108)	4	2 (8)	2 (6)	2 (6)	Not released
BCS	Not released							1	1	1	1	4	2	2	2	Not released

*Source: ESPN.com: 2012 NCAA Football Rankings

== After the season ==
After their victory over Notre Dame for the national championship, the team arrived at Tuscaloosa Regional Airport on the afternoon of January 8, and several hundred fans were there to greet them upon their arrival. On January 19, a championship parade was made through the streets of Tuscaloosa in recognition of the 2012 championship season. The parade concluded with Eli Gold as the master of ceremonies for an event on the Walk of Champions at Bryant–Denny Stadium that honored the 2012 team. On April 16, the team made their trip to the White House, where President Barack Obama offered congratulatory remarks for their championship season. As part of the A-Day celebrations on April 20, the 2012 team captains Barret Jones, Damion Square and Chance Warmack were honored at the Walk of Fame ceremony at the base of Denny Chimes.

=== Final statistics ===
After their victory over Notre Dame in the BCS National Championship Game, Alabama's final team statistics were released. On the defensive side of the ball, of the 120 FBS teams, the Crimson Tide was ranked near the top of all major defensive categories nationally and first in all categories in conference. They ranked first in total defense (250.00 yards per game), scoring defense (10.93 points per game) and rushing defense (76.36 yards per game) and ranked seventh in passing defense (173.64 yards per game). Individually, C. J. Mosley led the team with 107 total tackles, 41 of which were assisted, and 66 solo tackles. Adrian Hubbard was tied for 73rd nationally, 8th in conference and 1st on the team with 7 quarterback sacks. Hubbard was also 20th in conference and 1st on the team with 11 tackles for loss. Ha'Sean Clinton-Dix was tied for 30th nationally, 3rd in conference and 1st on the team with five of Alabama's 18 total interceptions of the season.

On offense, of the 120 FBS teams, Alabama ranked 12th in scoring offense (38.71 points per game), 16th in rushing offense (227.50 yards per game), 31st in total offense (445.50 yards per game) and 75th in passing offense (218.00 yards per game). In conference, they ranked second in rushing and scoring offense, fourth in total offense and eighth in passing offense. Individually, A. J. McCarron led the nation with a pass efficiency rating of 175.28. McCarron also led the team in passing offense and completed 211 of 314 passes for 2,933 passing yards and 30 touchdowns. Amari Cooper led the team with 59 receptions for 1,000 yards and 11 touchdown receptions. Eddie Lacy led the team with 204 rushing attempts for 1,322 yards and 17 touchdown runs. T. J. Yeldon was second on the team with 175 rushing attempts for 1,108 yards and 12 touchdown runs. Nationally, their total rushing yards placed Lacy 40th (3rd in conference) and Yeldon 65th (9th in conference).

=== Awards ===
Following the SEC Championship Game, multiple Alabama players were recognized for their on-field performances with a variety of awards and recognitions. At the team awards banquet on December 2, Barrett Jones, Damian Square and Chance Warmack were each named the permanent captains of the 2012 squad. At that time C. J. Mosley was also named the 2012 most valuable player with Nico Johnson and Dee Milliner named defensive players of the year and A. J. McCarron and Jones named offensive players of the year.

==== Conference ====
The SEC recognized several players for their individual performances with various awards. On December 5, Barret Jones was named the SEC Scholar-Athlete of the Year. On December 3, Jones, Dee Milliner, C. J. Mosley and Chance Warmack were named to the AP All-SEC First Team. D. J. Fluker, A. J. McCarron, Eddie Lacy and Jesse Williams were named to the AP All-SEC Second Team; Robert Lester and Ha'Sean Clinton-Dix were named to the AP All-SEC Honorable Mention Team. Fluker, Jones, Lacy, Milliner, Mosley and Warmack were named to the Coaches' All-SEC First Team. Lester and McCarron were named to the Coaches' All-SEC Second Team. T. J. Yeldon, Amari Cooper, Ryan Kelly and D. J. Pettway were named to the SEC All-Freshman Team.

==== National ====
After the season, a number of Alabama players were named as national award winners and finalists. Finalists for major awards from the Crimson Tide included: Dee Milliner for the Bronko Nagurski Trophy and the Jim Thorpe Award, C. J. Mosley for the Butkus Award, A. J. McCarron for the Johnny Unitas Golden Arm Award and the Manning Award and Barrett Jones for the Lombardi Award and the Outland Trophy. On December 4, Jones was awarded the William V. Campbell Trophy, often referred to as the "Academic Heisman," and on December 6 he was awarded the Rimington Trophy as the top center in college football and named as the Academic All-America of the Year. On the coaches' side, defensive coordinator Kirby Smart was named the 2012 AFCA FBS Assistant Coach of the Year.

For their individual performances during the regular season, several players were named to various national All-American Teams. Dee Milliner, C. J. Mosley and Chance Warmack were named to the American Football Coaches Association (AFCA) All-America Team. Barrett Jones, Milliner, Mosley and Warmack were named to the Walter Camp All-America First Team (WC). D. J. Fluker was named to the Walter Camp All-America Second Team. Jones, Milliner, Mosley and Warmack were named to the Sporting News (TSN) All-America Team. Amari Cooper, Denzel Devall and T. J. Yeldon were named to the TSN Freshman All-America Team. Milliner, Mosley, Jones and Warmack were named to the Associated Press All-American First Team; Fluker was named to the Associated Press All-American Second Team; and A. J. McCarron was named to the Associated Press All-American Third Team. Jones, Milliner and Warmack were named to the Football Writers Association of America (FWAA) All-America Team.

The NCAA recognizes five All-America lists in the determination of both consensus and unanimous All-America selections: the AP, AFCA, the FWAA, TSN and the WC. In order for an honoree to earn a consensus selection, he must be selected as first team in three of the five lists recognized by the NCAA, and unanimous selections must be selected as first team in all five lists. As such, for the 2012 season both Milliner and Warmack were unanimous selections and Jones and Mosley were consensus selections.

==== All-star games ====
Several Alabama players were selected by postseason all-star games. Nico Johnson, Robert Lester, Carson Tinker and Michael Williams were selected to play in the Senior Bowl. Invitations were also extended to Barrett Jones, Chance Warmack and Jesse Williams to participate in the game. Additionally, D. J. Fluker and Justin Pugh of Syracuse were invited to compete in the Senior Bowl as fourth-year juniors and became the first non-seniors to participate in the history of the game. Seniors Quinton Dial, Kelly Johnson, Jeremy Shelley, Damion Square and Carson Tinker participated in the inaugural Raycom College Football All-Star Classic. Alabama did not have players participate in the East–West Shrine Game, Casino del Sol College All-Star Game or the National Football League Players Association Collegiate Bowl.

=== Coaching changes ===
In the weeks that followed the conclusion of the season, several changes were made to the Alabama coaching staff. On December 20 defensive backs coach Jeremy Pruitt was officially hired as defensive coordinator at Florida State as the replacement for Mark Stoops. Pruitt remained on staff through the 2013 BCS National Championship Game. On January 9, 2013, former Colorado defensive coordinator Greg Brown was hired as Pruitt's replacement for secondary coach. On February 8, 2013, offensive line coach Jeff Stoutland resigned his position and took an assistant coaching position with the Philadelphia Eagles. On February 18, former Florida International head coach Mario Cristobal was hired as Stoutland's replacement for offensive line coach. On February 21, Mike Groh resigned from his position as wide receivers coach and took the same position with the Chicago Bears. Florida State's tight ends coach and recruiting coordinator Billy Napier was later hired as Groh's replacement as wide receivers coach.

=== NFL draft ===
Of all the draft-eligible juniors, D. J. Fluker, Eddie Lacy and Dee Milliner declared their eligibility for the 2013 NFL draft on January 11. At the time of their announcement, Milliner was projected to be a first-round pick and both Fluker and Lacy were projected to be no lower than second-round picks. Adrian Hubbard, A. J. McCarron, C. J. Mosley and Anthony Steen had each previously indicated they would not declare for the draft and would return for their senior seasons. In February 2013, ten Alabama players, seven seniors and three juniors, were invited to the NFL Scouting Combine. The invited players were defensive linemen Quinton Dial, Damion Square and Jesse Williams, linebacker Nico Johnson, defensive backs Robert Lester and Dee Milliner, running back Eddie Lacy and offensive linemen D. J. Fluker, Barrett Jones and Chance Warmack.

In the first round, three Crimson Tide players were selected consecutively: Milliner (9th New York Jets), Warmack (10th Tennessee Titans), and Fluker (11th San Diego Chargers). Lacy was selected in the second round (61st Green Bay Packers); Johnson (99th Kansas City Chiefs) and Jones (113th St. Louis Rams) were selected in the fourth round; Jesse Williams (137th Seattle Seahawks) and Dial (157th San Francisco 49ers) were selected in the fifth round; and Michael Williams (211th Detroit Lions) was selected in the seventh round. In the days after the draft, four players from the 2012 squad that were not drafted signed as undrafted free agents. These players included Lester (Carolina Panthers), Carson Tinker (Jacksonville Jaguars), Damion Square (Philadelphia Eagles) and Jeremy Shelley (Atlanta Falcons).
