= A'Shawn Robinson =

American football player (born 1995)

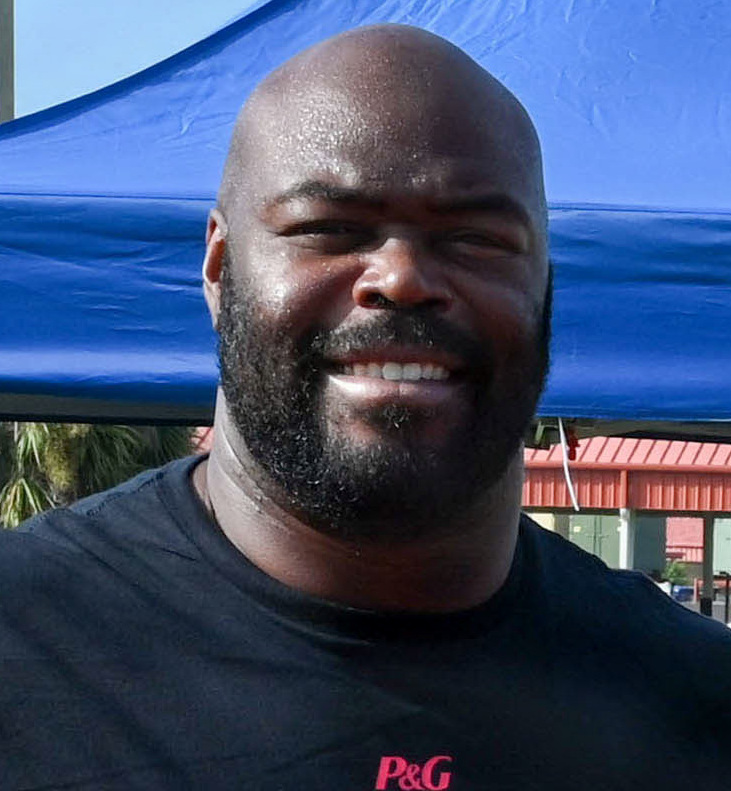
- Robinson in 2026

No. 91 – Tampa Bay Buccaneers
- Position: Defensive tackle
- Roster status: Active

Personal information
- Born: March 21, 1995 (age 31); Fort Worth, Texas, U.S.
- Listed height: 6 ft 3 in (1.91 m)
- Listed weight: 320 lb (145 kg)

Career information
- High school: Fort Worth (TX) Arlington Heights
- College: Alabama (2013–2015)
- NFL draft: 2016: 2nd round, 46th overall pick

Career history
- Detroit Lions (2016–2019); Los Angeles Rams (2020–2022); New York Giants (2023); Carolina Panthers (2024–2025); Tampa Bay Buccaneers (2026–present)

Awards and highlights
- Super Bowl champion (LVI); CFP national champion (2015); Consensus All-American (2015); First-team All-SEC (2015)

Career NFL statistics as of Week 9, 2026
- Total tackles: 524
- Sacks: 16.0
- Forced fumbles: 6
- Fumble recoveries: 4
- Pass deflections: 26
- Interceptions: 3
- Defensive touchdowns: 1
- Stats at Pro Football Reference

A'Shawn Robinson (born March 21, 1995) is an American professional football defensive tackle for the Tampa Bay Buccaneers of the National Football League (NFL). He played college football for the Alabama Crimson Tide. He was selected by the Detroit Lions in the second round of the 2016 NFL draft and has also played in the NFL for the Los Angeles Rams, with whom he won Super Bowl LVI.

Robinson was a five-star recruit out of high school, with one service listing him as the nation's top defensive tackle. Robinson played in all 13 of Alabama's games in the 2013 season and started in two games. Robinson was the only true freshman under head coach Nick Saban at Alabama to lead the team in sacks. At 320 pounds, Robinson would line-up at both defensive end and tackle for Alabama during his freshman season. In his junior season, he appeared at fullback in goal line situations in games against LSU and Michigan State in addition to starting on the defensive line.

== Early life ==
A native of Fort Worth, Texas, Robinson attended Arlington Heights High School. In addition to football, he competed on his high school's varsity basketball and track & field teams. A two-way lineman for the Arlington Heights Yellowjackets football team, Robinson was coached by Todd Whitten in his senior season. After the season, Robinson played for the West squad in the U.S. Army All-American Bowl, and was selected to the 2012 USA Today All-American Second-team.

Considered a five-star recruit by Rivals.com, Robinson was listed as the No. 4 defensive tackle in the nation in 2013. ESPN listed him as a four-star recruit and ranked him 105th overall on their "ESPN 300" ranking. Robinson chose to attend Alabama over Texas, Southern California, Louisiana State, Arkansas, and Florida State. He was originally verbally committed to attend Texas as of February 2012. Just prior to National Signing Day in February 2013, however, he de-committed from Texas and officially signed with Alabama.

== College career ==
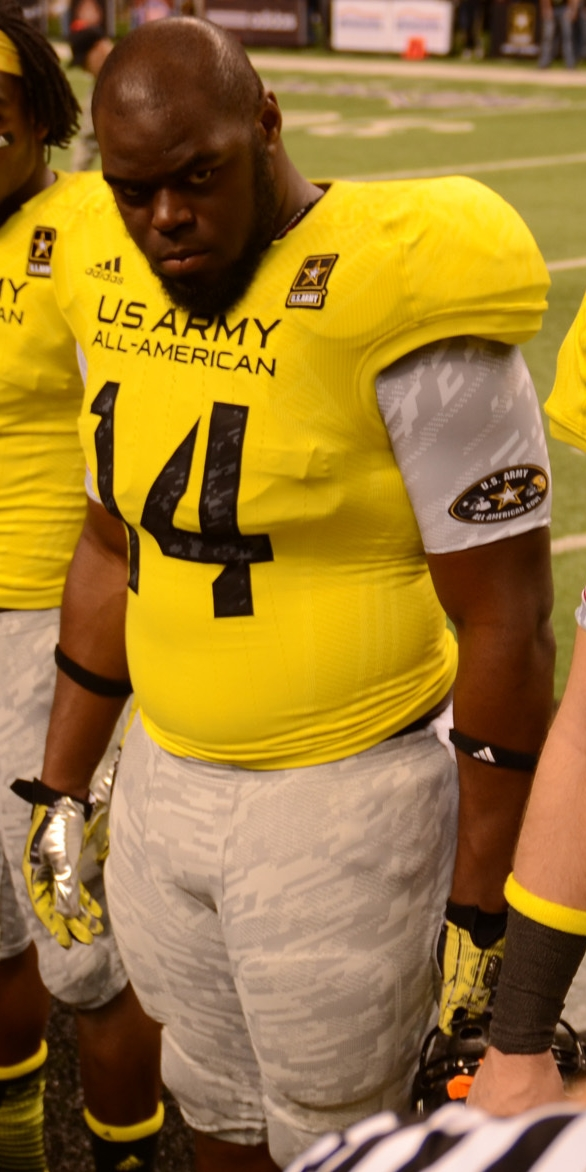
A'Shawn Robinson playing in the U.S. Army All-American Bowl.

=== Freshman year (2013) ===
Robinson started practicing with Alabama in August 2013 and played in the first game of Alabama's 2013 season on August 31, 2013. Robinson and tight end O. J. Howard were Alabama's only true freshmen to have both started a game and played in every game of the 2013 season. Robinson was also the only true freshman under head coach Nick Saban at Alabama to lead the team in sacks.

Robinson led Alabama in sacks and was seventh on the team in tackles. He was named by Alabama's coaches as one of the defensive "players of the week" in three of Alabama's 12 games. No other true freshman was a "player of the week" on offense or defense during the 2013 season. At Alabama's annual awards banquet after the 2013 regular season Robinson was one of four players to receive an "Iron Man Award" given to players who have shown the most dedication to the individual and team goals of the Crimson Tide's year-round strength and conditioning program.

At the end of his first college football season Robinson was the only Alabama freshman named to the Southeastern Conference (SEC) Coaches' All-Freshman team. Robinson was also on the 2013 Sporting News Freshman All-American team.

Alabama's pass rushers in 2013	Sacks	Quarterback hurries (QBH)	Tackles	TFL (ex. sacks)	TFL yards
A'Shawn Robinson	5.5	5	38	2.5	40
Denzel Devall	5	3	30	2.0	22
Adrian Hubbard	3	4	33	2.5	27
Trey DePriest	2	0	65	5.5	23
C. J. Mosley	0	10	108	9.0	20

=== Sophomore year (2014) ===
Robinson was selected to the 2014 first-team in the pre-season Media Days All-SEC Team. He was held out of some practices in August due to a sprained knee. He led his team in tackles in the 2014 SEC Championship game versus Missouri. It was the first time in his career that he led the team in tackles. He started every game in the 2014 season, during which Alabama led the nation in rushing defense. His teammates gave him the nickname of "Infamous A-Tron," a blend of A'Shawn and Megatron. Robinson earned Honorable Mention on the All-SEC team after the 2014 season.

=== Junior year (2015) ===
Robinson started every game for the second season in a row and anchored a deep defensive line that helped Alabama lead college football in rushing yards allowed per game, yards per carry allowed per game, and sacks. Robinson led Alabama in quarterback hurries and was a finalist for the Outland Trophy, an award for the nation's best interior lineman (both offensive and defensive). Robinson did not win the Outland Trophy, and the Alabama football team used this snub as motivation in their College Football Playoff game against Michigan State. After the season, Robinson decided to forgo his senior year and enter the 2016 NFL draft.

Year	School	GP–GS	Tackles				Sacks	Pass Defense				Fumbles		Blocked
Year	School	GP–GS	Solo	Ast	Total	Loss–Yards	No–Yards	Int–Yards	BU	PD	QBH	Rcv–Yards	FF	Kick
2013	Alabama	13–2	16	22	38	8.0–40	5.5–34	0–0	1	1	5	0–0	0	1
2014	Alabama	14–14	16	33	49	6.5–11	0.0–0	0–0	3	2	4	0–0	1	1
2015	Alabama	15–15	18	28	46	7.5–25	3.5–19	0–0	2	2	10	1–9	0	1

== Professional career ==
Pre-draft measurables
Height	Weight	Arm length	Hand span	Wingspan	40-yard dash	10-yard split	20-yard split	20-yard shuttle	Three-cone drill	Vertical jump	Broad jump	Bench press
6 ft 3 5/8 in (1.92 m)	307 lb (139 kg)	34 1/2 in (0.88 m)	10 1/2 in (0.27 m)	6 ft 11 1/2 in (2.12 m)	5.20 s	1.79 s	3.01 s	4.74 s	7.80 s	26.0 in (0.66 m)	8 ft 10 in (2.69 m)	22 reps
All values from NFL Combine

=== Detroit Lions ===
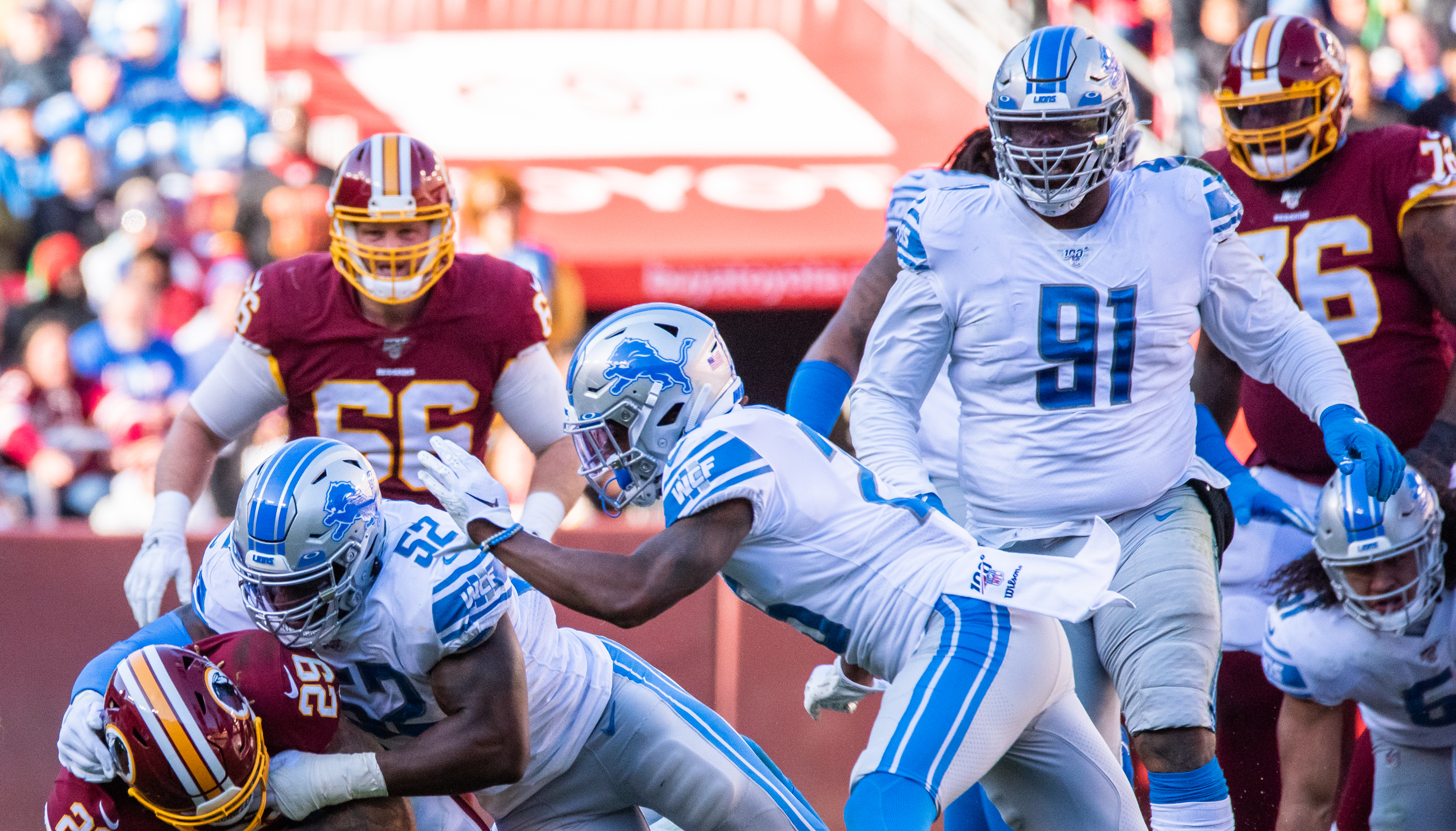
Robinson in a game against the Washington Redskins

Robinson was selected in the second round with the 46th overall pick by the Detroit Lions in the 2016 NFL Draft. On May 10, 2016, Robinson signed with the Detroit Lions. He recorded his first career sack against Philadelphia Eagles quarterback Carson Wentz in Week 5. In Week 16 of the 2016 season, against the Dallas Cowboys, Robinson drew an unnecessary roughness penalty for tackling running back Ezekiel Elliott too hard. The motion Robinson used on the tackle made it look like he was picking up Elliot and slamming him down, but the announcers agreed that the hit looked clean. He finished his rookie season leading all defensive tackles in the NFL in pass deflections with seven.

During Week 6 of the 2017 NFL season, Robinson recorded his first career interception off Drew Brees and returned it two yards for a touchdown. However, the Lions still lost to the New Orleans Saints by a score of 52–38. In Week 9, he blocked a Mason Crosby field goal attempt to help the Lions beat the Green Bay Packers at Lambeau Field by a score of 30–17.

In the 2018 season, Robinson played in 13 games with seven starts, recording 49 tackles, one sack, and one forced fumble. He was placed on injured reserve on December 28, 2018.

In the 2019 season, Robinson played in 13 games with nine starts, recording 40 tackles, 1.5 sacks, and one forced fumble.

=== Los Angeles Rams ===
On April 24, 2020, the Los Angeles Rams signed Robinson to a two-year contract. He was placed on the active/non-football injury list at the start of training camp on August 8, 2020. Robinson was placed on reserve/non-football injury to start the season. He was activated on October 30. Robinson appeared in eight games during the regular season.

In the 2021 season, Robinson recorded two sacks, 67 total tackles, and two forced fumbles in 17 games. Robinson helped the Rams win Super Bowl LVI by defeating the Cincinnati Bengals 23–20. In the Super Bowl, Robinson recorded six tackles and one sack and was instrumental in shutting down the Bengals running game.

On November 26, 2022, Robinson was placed on injured reserve with a torn meniscus. He finished the 2022 season with 42 total tackles in ten games.

=== New York Giants ===
On April 24, 2023, Robinson signed a one-year, $8 million deal with the New York Giants. In the 2023 season, Robinson finished with 62 total tackles and two passes defended in 17 games.

=== Carolina Panthers ===
On March 13, 2024, Robinson signed a three-year, $22.5 million contract with the Carolina Panthers.

Robinson had a career year in 2024, recording career-highs with 80 tackles and 5.5 sacks through 16 starts. He followed that up with 65 tackles and 2.5 sacks in 2025.

Robinson was released by the Panthers on March 10, 2026.

=== Tampa Bay Buccaneers ===
On March 11, 2026, Robinson signed a one-year, $10 million contract with the Tampa Bay Buccaneers.

== NFL career statistics ==
=== Regular season ===
Legend
	Won the Super Bowl
**Bold**	Career high

Year	Team	Games		Tackles					Fumbles					Interceptions					
Year	Team	GP	GS	Cmb	Solo	Ast	Sck	TFL	FF	Fmb	FR	Yds	TD	Int	Yds	Avg	Lng	TD	PD
2016	DET	16	5	30	22	8	2.0	6	0	0	0	0	0	0	0	0.0	0	0	**7**
2017	DET	16	**16**	53	32	21	0.5	4	1	0	0	0	0	1	**2**	**2.0**	**2**	**1**	6
2018	DET	13	7	49	34	15	1.0	3	1	0	1	0	0	0	0	0.0	0	0	0
2019	DET	13	9	40	32	8	1.5	3	1	0	**2**	**3**	0	0	0	0.0	0	0	3
2020	LAR	8	0	12	6	6	0.0	0	0	0	0	0	0	0	0	0.0	0	0	1
2021	LAR	**17**	14	67	33	34	2.0	2	**2**	0	0	0	0	0	0	0.0	0	0	0
2022	LAR	10	10	42	22	20	0.0	2	0	0	0	0	0	0	0	0.0	0	0	0
2023	NYG	**17**	13	62	34	28	0.0	6	0	0	0	0	0	0	0	0.0	0	0	2
2024	CAR	16	**16**	**80**	**43**	37	**5.5**	**8**	1	0	0	0	0	0	0	0.0	0	0	1
2025	CAR	**17**	**16**	65	21	**44**	2.5	3	0	**1**	1	**3**	0	0	0	0.0	0	0	3
2026	TAM	9	6	24	6	18	1.0	1	0	0	0	0	0	**2**	0	0.0	0	0	3
Career		152	112	524	285	239	16.0	38	6	1	4	6	0	3	2	1.5	2	1	26

=== Postseason ===
Year	Team	Games		Tackles					Fumbles					Interceptions					
Year	Team	GP	GS	Cmb	Solo	Ast	Sck	TFL	FF	Fmb	FR	Yds	TD	Int	Yds	Avg	Lng	TD	PD
2016	DET	1	1	7	2	5	0.0	0	0	0	0	0	0	0	0	0.0	0	0	0
2020	LAR	2	0	6	4	2	0.0	0	**1**	0	0	0	0	0	0	0.0	0	0	0
2021	LAR	**4**	**4**	**22**	**12**	**10**	**1.0**	**1**	0	0	0	0	0	0	0	0.0	0	0	0
2025	CAR	1	1	3	2	1	0.0	0	0	0	0	0	0	0	0	0.0	0	0	0
Career		8	6	38	20	18	1.0	1	1	0	0	0	0	0	0	0.0	0	0	0

== Personal life ==
Due to his physical appearance, Robinson is often questioned of his actual age. Having started playing football at the age of 4, his mother stated that she would bring his birth certificate to games, due to opposing coaches challenging his age for eligibility. "I couldn't play because I was too big and they had to see my birth certificate," said Robinson. This would continue into his adult years; he shared that he was often mistaken for a 35-year-old coach when he was actually a 20-year-old student athlete.
