= Jesse Williams (American football) =

Australian gridiron football player (born 1990)

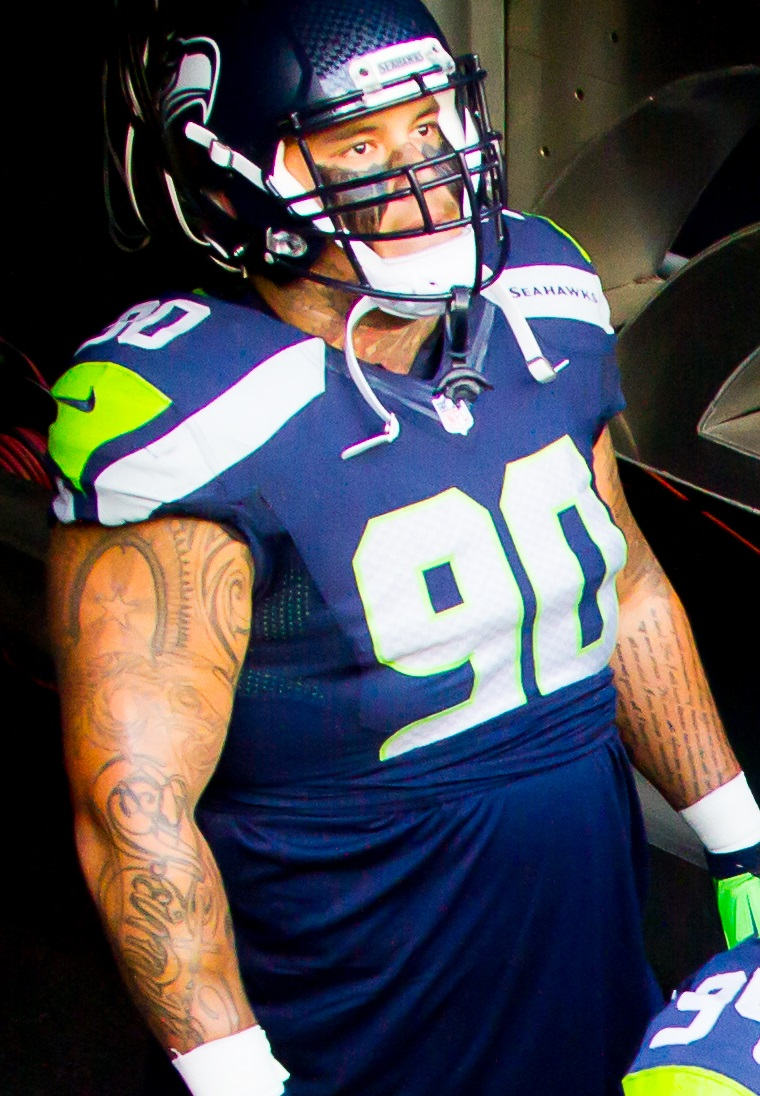
- Williams with the Seattle Seahawks in 2015

No. 90
- Position: Defensive tackle

Personal information
- Born: 2 November 1990 (age 36); Thursday Island, Queensland, Australia
- Listed height: 6 ft 3 in (1.91 m)
- Listed weight: 325 lb (147 kg)

Career information
- High school: Cavendish Road (Brisbane, Queensland)
- College: Arizona Western (2009–2010); Alabama (2011–2012)
- NFL draft: 2013: 5th round, 137th overall pick

Career history
- Seattle Seahawks (2013–2015)

Awards and highlights
- Super Bowl champion (XLVIII); BCS national champion (2011, 2012); Second-team All-SEC (2012)
- Stats at Pro Football Reference

Jesse Williams (born 2 November 1990), nicknamed "tha Monstar", is an Australian former professional American football defensive tackle. Williams played college football for the University of Alabama, where he was a starter on the defensive line for the 2011 and 2012 national championship teams. The Seahawks chose him in the fifth round of the 2013 NFL draft. Although he spent the majority of his pro career on the injured reserve list, Williams became the first Australian to win a Super Bowl ring as a member of Seattle's 2013 team.

== Early life ==
Williams was born on Thursday Island, Queensland, to Torres Strait Islander parents, and raised in Brisbane, attending Norman Park State School and Cavendish Road State High School. He grew up playing rugby league and basketball and did not start playing gridiron football until he was 14 years old. He first played football with the Bayside Ravens after he attended one of their practices to watch a friend play quarterback. In his first year as a player, Williams was named Rookie of the Year and made the Queensland Under 19 team that would go on to win Australian National Championships. For his efforts in the 2008 season, he was named Defensive Player of the Year with the Ravens.

== College career ==
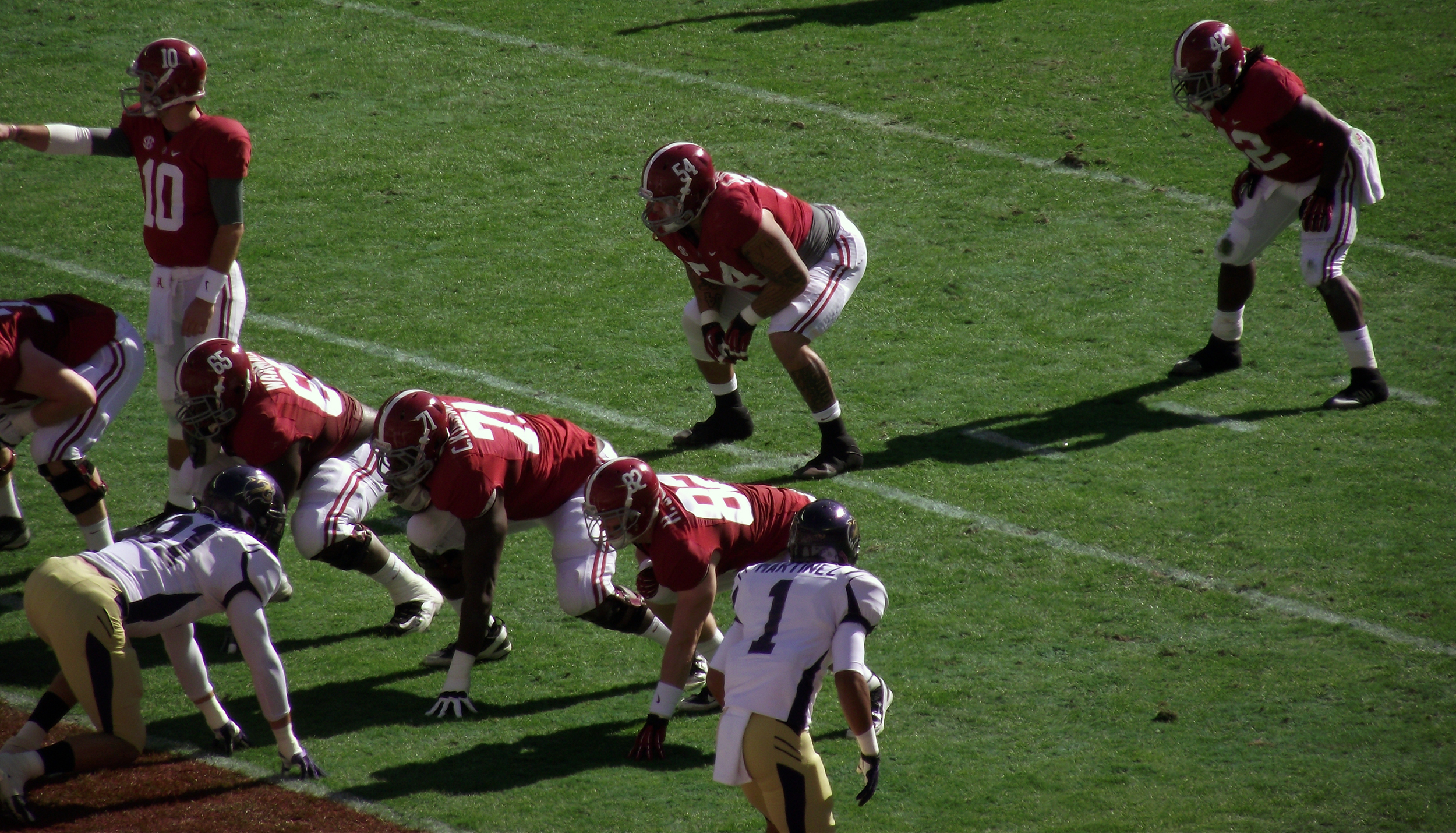
Williams on offence against Western Carolina in 2012.

Williams was originally recruited by University of Hawaii coaches and offered a scholarship to play for the Hawaii Warriors football team after a Warriors scout saw him play during the Australian National Championships. He verbally committed to play for Hawaii when he was 16 years old; however, the NCAA clearing house said he was missing a mathematics and an English class and would not be able to enroll for the 2009 season. Williams later chose to enroll at Arizona Western College, after coaches saw him play in an exhibition against New Zealand while they were teaching at a football clinic. At the time, Williams was the first Indigenous Australian to receive a scholarship to play college football in the United States. At Western, Williams developed into one of the highest rated recruits out of junior college for the 2011 class. After receiving scholarship offers to play from over 25 schools, Williams enrolled in the University of Alabama for the spring 2011 semester, and began practice with coach Nick Saban's Alabama Crimson Tide football team.

Williams started all 13 games of the 2011 season with the Crimson Tide at defensive end, and he made 24 total tackles and half of a quarterback sack during the course of the year. During the offseason, Williams gained a degree of internet fame when images of him bench pressing 600 pounds (270 kg) were posted to his Twitter account.

Prior to the start of the 2012 season, Williams was named to the preseason award watch lists for the Chuck Bednarik Award, the Lombardi Award, the Bronko Nagurski Trophy and the Outland Trophy. He was also named to the ESPN.com Preseason All-America Team at nose tackle.

For the 2012 regular season, Williams was a starter for Alabama as the nose guard in 13 of the 14 games, and he made 37 total tackles, one quarterback sack and blocked a kick during the course of the year. In their 41–14 victory over the Michigan Wolverines to open the 2012 season, Williams suffered a concussion that kept him out of Alabama's week two matchup against Western Kentucky. He returned to the starting line-up for their week three game against Arkansas. In their 52–0 victory over the Razorbacks, Williams also played on offence for the first time in his Crimson Tide career when he lined up at the fullback position late in the second quarter on a one-yard Eddie Lacy touchdown run. In the SEC Championship game against Georgia he blocked for an Eddie Lacy touchdown run on the first play of the fourth quarter after sitting out the third quarter with a knee injury. After the season, the AP named Williams to the AP All-SEC Second-team.

=== College statistics ===
Year	School	GP–GS	Tackles				Sacks	Pass defense				Fumbles		Blocked
Year	School	GP–GS	Solo	Ast	Total	Loss–Yards	No–Yards	Int–Yards	BU	PD	QBH	Rcv–Yards	FF	Kick
2009	Arizona Western	10–10	12	34	46	6.5–40	4–24	0–0	0	0	0	0–0	4	0
2010	Arizona Western	7–7	8	22	30	6–29	2–12	1–33	2	0	0	1–0	0	0
2011	Alabama	13–13	10	14	24	4.0–10	0.5–1	0–0	1	1	3	0–0	0	0
2012	Alabama	13–13	7	30	37	2.5–8	1–3	0–0	2	2	4	0–0	0	1

== Professional career ==
Prior to the NFL Scouting Combine, Williams, who reportedly bench-pressed a maximum of 600 lb (270 kg), vowed to break the 225-pound bench press record of 51 repetitions, established by Justin Ernest in 1999. However, he eventually came well short, recording 30 reps. Predicted to be selected as high as late in the first round, Williams was taken in the fifth round of the 2013 NFL draft with the 137th overall selection by the Seattle Seahawks.

Pre-draft measurables
Height	Weight	Arm length	Hand span	40-yard dash	10-yard split	20-yard split	20-yard shuttle	Three-cone drill	Bench press
6 ft 3 3/8 in (1.91 m)	323 lb (147 kg)	32 in (0.81 m)	9 3/8 in (0.24 m)	4.94 s	1.77 s	2.90 s	4.83 s	7.81 s	30 reps
All values from NFL Combine

Williams signed his initial rookie contract with Seattle on 10 May 2013. On 26 August 2013, Williams was placed on the injured reserve list for the 2013 season as the result of a knee injury that sidelined him for the entirety of his rookie season with Seattle. Through Week 16 of the regular season, Williams rehabbed his knee in his native Australia where he used Orthokine to help with joint pain associated with his knee injury. Although he did not play a down during the season due to his injury, Williams became the first Australian to win a Super Bowl ring after Seattle's victory in Super Bowl XLVIII.

On 1 August 2014, Williams was again placed on the injured reserve list for the 2014 season once again as the result of a knee injury. After not playing during the regular season for a second consecutive year due to injury, the Seahawks waived Williams on 6 March 2015. Williams was re-signed on April 1, 2015.

On 9 March 2016, Williams was waived by the Seahawks.

== Personal life ==
In May 2015, Williams was diagnosed with papillary Type 2 cancer and had to undergo kidney surgery. In a statement through the Seahawks, Williams said, "Although disappointing, I am a fighter and will handle this. I am going to focus on my health and fighting this battle with a return to football as my ultimate goal".

After football, Williams became a strength and conditioning coach. He has contributed to the growth of American football in Australia and has been active in community work in his local area where he was raised.
