= List of Eastern Kentucky Colonels in the NFL draft =

This is a list of Eastern Kentucky Colonels in the NFL Draft.

== Key ==
B	Back	K	Kicker	NT	Nose tackle
C	Center	LB	Linebacker	FB	Fullback
DB	Defensive back	P	Punter	HB	Halfback
DE	Defensive end	QB	Quarterback	WR	Wide receiver
DT	Defensive tackle	RB	Running back	G	Guard
E	End	T	Offensive tackle	TE	Tight end

== Selections ==
Year	Round	Overall	Player	Team	Position
1951	17	197	Ray Pelfrey	Green Bay Packers	B
1955	17	204	Don Daly	Detroit Lions	B
1955	19	228	Bob Muller	Detroit Lions	C
1955	23	266	Karl Bays	Chicago Cardinals	T
1956	19	229	John Sebest	Cleveland Browns	E
1957	22	263	Tom Schulte	Detroit Lions	E
1968	3	60	Aaron March	Boston Patriots	WR
1973	1	8	Wally Chambers	Chicago Bears	DE
1976	10	269	Junior Hardin	New Orleans Saints	LB
1977	3	65	Elmo Boyd	San Francisco 49ers	WR
1977	9	244	Roosevelt Kelly	Pittsburgh Steelers	TE
1982	4	107	George Floyd	New York Jets	DB
1983	5	130	Steve Bird	St. Louis Cardinals	WR
1984	5	122	Tron Armstrong	New York Jets	WR
1986	8	219	Joe Mauntel	Los Angeles Raiders	LB
1988	1	18	Aaron Jones	Pittsburgh Steelers	DE
1988	9	244	Danny Copeland	Cleveland Browns	DB
1988	10	252	John Jackson	Pittsburgh Steelers	T
1989	2	49	Jessie Small	Philadelphia Eagles	LB
1989	3	71	Elroy Harris	Seattle Seahawks	RB
1989	8	218	Myron Guyton	New York Giants	DB
1989	12	327	Mike Cadore	New Orleans Saints	WR
1992	10	255	Tim Lester	Los Angeles Raiders	RB
1994	5	155	Chad Bratzke	New York Giants	DE
1996	2	54	Jason Dunn	Philadelphia Eagles	TE
1997	6	188	Tony McCombs	Arizona Cardinals	LB
1999	5	161	Tyrone Hopson	San Francisco 49ers	G
1999	7	247	Rondel Menendez	Atlanta Falcons	WR
2001	5	140	Alex Bannister	Seattle Seahawks	WR
2003	6	213	Yeremiah Bell	Miami Dolphins	DB
2004	7	238	Larry Turner	St. Louis Rams	T
2008	3	79	Antwaun Molden	Houston Texans	DB
2016	2	39	Noah Spence	Tampa Bay Buccaneers	DE
2024	7	239	Josiah Ezirim	New Orleans Saints	T

== Notable undrafted players ==
Note: No drafts held before 1920

Debut year	Player name	Position	Debut NFL/AFL team	Notes
1949	Joe Hollingsworth	FB	Pittsburgh Steelers	
1987	Dale Dawson	PK	Minnesota Vikings	
1987	Byron Ingram	G	Kansas City Chiefs	
1987	John Klingel	DE	Philadelphia Eagles	
1996	Dialleo Burks	WR	Philadelphia Eagles	
1998	David Hoelscher	DT	Green Bay Packers	
1999	Justin Ernest	DT	New Orleans Saints	
2010	Derek Hardman	G	Tampa Bay Buccaneers	
2013	Tyrone Goard	WR	Cincinnati Bengals	
2015	Jordan Berry	P	Pittsburgh Steelers	
2015	Matt Lengel	TE	Cincinnati Bengals	
2018	Tim Boyle	QB	Green Bay Packers	
2020	Aaron Patrick	LB	Jacksonville Jaguars	
2023	Matthew Jackson	S	Tennessee Titans	
2023	T. K. McLendon Jr.	DE	Tennessee Titans	
