= Denzel Devall =

American football player (born 1994)

Current position
- Title: Director of Player Development
- Team: Alabama
- Conference: Southeastern Conference

Biographical details
- Born: 1994 (age 31–32); Bastrop, Louisiana, U.S.
- Education: University of Alabama

Playing career
- 2012-2015: Alabama
- Position: Linebacker

Administrative career (AD unless noted)
- 2016–present: Alabama

Accomplishments and honors

Awards
- CFP National Champion (2016); BCS National Champion (2013); Freshman All-American (2012)

Denzel Devall (born 1994) is an American former college football linebacker who played for the University of Alabama from 2012 to 2015. In July 2016, he started serving as a personnel assistant on the Alabama Crimson Tide football coaching staff. In January and February 2017, he was promoted first to assistant strength and conditioning coach and then promoted again to director of player development.

== Early life ==
A native of Bastrop, Louisiana, Devall attended Bastrop High School, where he played on the football team. He finished his junior season with 108 tackles, five sacks, three fumbles caused, two fumbles recovered, and one interception. Bastrop finished the season with an 11–2 record, losing 26–20 in a hard-fought four-overtime game to Anthony Johnson's O. Perry Walker team in the Class 4A semifinals. In his senior year, Devall was credited with 73 tackles, including 53 solo stops, two sacks, three pass breakups, one fumble forced and one fumble recovery. Bastrop fell short of the playoffs, with a 6–4 season record. Nonetheless, Devall was a 2011 Louisiana Sports Writers Association 4A All-State selection.

Considered a four-star recruit by Rivals.com, Devall was listed as the No. 5 inside linebacker in his class. He chose Alabama over offers from Louisiana State, Texas A&M, Oklahoma, Arkansas, and Texas Christian.

== College career ==
Contributing as a true freshman, Devall saw action in all 14 games at the "Jack" linebacker position, and totaled 18 tackles, with two sacks, three tackles for loss and three quarterback hurries en route to being named to The Sporting News Freshman All-America Team. His biggest game came on October 27, against Mississippi State, when he recorded two tackles for loss (one sack) and received Defensive Player of the Week honors from the Alabama coaching staff. Devall drew comparisons to former Alabama outside linebacker Courtney Upshaw.

In his sophomore year, Devall took on a bigger role in Alabama's defense. He played in thirteen games, recording 30 tackles (including 14 solo), and five tackles for a loss of yardage. He also tied Adrian Hubbard for second-most quarterback sacks on the team with three, behind A'Shawn Robinson's 5.5 sacks. In a 52–0 shutout against Arkansas, Devall was credited with three tackles, 1.5 tackles for loss, a sack and a quarterback hurry.
