= Adrian Hubbard =

American football player (born 1992)

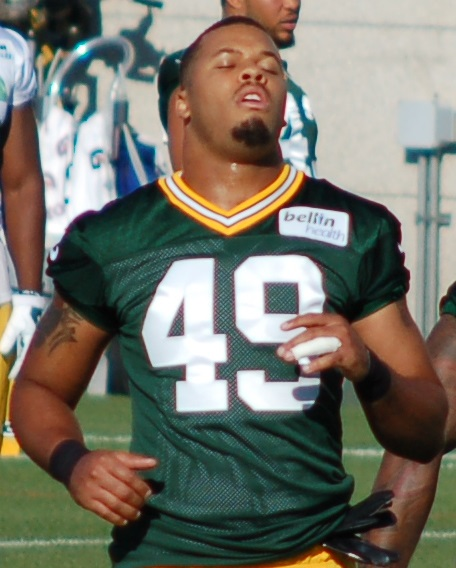
- Hubbard with the Packers in 2015

No. 49
- Position: Outside linebacker

Personal information
- Born: February 27, 1992 (age 34); Washington, D.C.
- Listed height: 6 ft 6 in (1.98 m)
- Listed weight: 257 lb (117 kg)

Career information
- High school: Norcross (GA)
- College: Alabama
- NFL draft: 2014: undrafted

Career history
- Green Bay Packers (2014–2015)*; Winnipeg Blue Bombers (2016)
- * Offseason or practice squad member only

Awards and highlights
- BCS national champion (2011, 2012)
- Stats at Pro Football Reference

Adrian Hubbard (born February 27, 1992) is an American former professional football player who was a linebacker in the National Football League (NFL). He played college football for the Alabama Crimson Tide.

== College career ==
As a redshirt sophomore in 2012, Hubbard had seven sacks, including one in the 2013 BCS National Championship Game. He led Alabama in sacks (7), tackles for loss (11) and forced fumbles (3). Hubbard recorded a sack in each of Alabama's last three games (Auburn, Georgia and Notre Dame). His 7.0 sacks ranked sixth in the SEC this season. After his junior season in 2013, he entered the 2014 NFL draft.

=== College career statistics ===
Year	School	GP–GS	Tackles				Sacks	Pass defense				Fumbles		Blocked
Year	School	GP–GS	Solo	Ast	Total	Loss–Yards	No–Yards	Int–Yards	BU	PD	QBH	Rcv–Yards	FF	Kick
2011	Alabama	9-0	3	6	9	1.5-5	0.0-0	0-0	0	0	1	0-0	0	0
2012	Alabama	14-12	24	17	41	11.0-54	7.0-44	0-0	1	1	4	0-0	3	0

== Professional career ==
Pre-draft measurables
Height	Weight	Arm length	Hand span
6 ft 6 in (1.98 m)	257 lb (117 kg)	34 1/2 in (0.88 m)	9 1/4 in (0.23 m)
All values from NFL Combine

=== Green Bay Packers ===
After going undrafted in the 2014 NFL draft, Hubbard signed with the Green Bay Packers on May 12, 2014.

=== Winnipeg Blue Bombers ===
Hubbard played for the Winnipeg Blue Bombers of the Canadian Football League in 2016.

=== Alternative leagues ===
He participated in The Spring League in 2017.

In October 2019, Hubbard was selected by the Los Angeles Wildcats in the 2020 XFL draft.
