= Justin Ernest =

American football player (born 1972)

No. 66
- Position: Defensive tackle

Personal information
- Born: December 17, 1972 (age 53)
- Listed height: 6 ft 3 in (1.91 m)
- Listed weight: 284 lb (129 kg)

Career information
- College: Eastern Kentucky
- NFL draft: 1999: undrafted

Career history
- New Orleans Saints (1999)*
- * Offseason or practice squad member only

Justin Ernest (born December 17, 1972) was an American former football defensive tackle. He played his college football at Eastern Kentucky University, where he was a 1997 All-Ohio Valley Conference pick. He never went on to play an NFL game despite his record-breaking combine.

Ernest established the current 225-pound bench press record at the NFL Scouting Combine with 51 repetitions.

Pre-draft measurables
Height	Weight	40-yard dash	10-yard split	20-yard split	20-yard shuttle	Three-cone drill	Vertical jump	Broad jump	Bench press
6 ft 3 in (1.91 m)	281 lb (127 kg)	4.79 s	1.69 s	2.78 s	4.24 s	7.37 s	31 in (0.79 m)	9 ft 5 in (2.87 m)	51 reps
All values from NFL Combine
