= NFL Scouting Combine =

Annual college football player showcase

- NFL Scouting Combine logo
- Dates: Every February
- Frequency: Annual
- Locations: Lucas Oil Stadium, Indianapolis
- Inaugurated: 1977
- Organizer: National Football League

The NFL Scouting Combine is a week-long showcase occurring every February at Lucas Oil Stadium (and formerly at the RCA Dome until 2008) in Indianapolis, where college football players perform physical and mental tests in front of National Football League coaches, general managers, and scouts. With increasing interest in the NFL draft, the scouting combine has grown in scope and significance, allowing personnel directors to evaluate upcoming prospects in a standardized setting. Its origins stem from the National, BLESTO, and Quadra Scouting organizations in 1977.

Athletes attend by invitation only. An athlete's performance during the combine can affect their draft status and salary, and ultimately their career. The draft has popularized the term "workout warrior", whereby an athlete's "draft stock" is increased based on superior measurable qualities such as size, speed, and strength, despite having an average or sub-par college career.

== History ==
Tex Schramm, the president and general manager of the Dallas Cowboys from 1960 to 1989, proposed to the NFL competition committee a centralization of the evaluation process for NFL teams. Prior to 1982, teams had to schedule individual visits with players to run them through drills and tests. The national invitational camp (NIC) was first held in Tampa, Florida, in 1982. It was originated by National Football Scouting, Inc. as a means for member organizations to look at NFL draft prospects. For non-member teams, two other camps were created and used from 1982 through 1984. The NIC was held in New Orleans, Louisiana, in 1984. It was renamed the NFL Scouting Combine following the merger of the three camps in 1985 to cut the cost of running the extra camps. It was held in Arizona in 1985 and once again in New Orleans in 1986 before permanently moving to Indianapolis in 1987.

== Tests and evaluations ==
Tests and evaluations include:

- 40-yard dash
- Bench press of 225 pounds (102 kg)
- Vertical jump
- Broad jump
- 20-yard shuttle
- 3 cone drill
- 60-yard shuttle
- Position-specific drills
- Interviews – each team is allowed 60 interviews in 15-minute intervals
- Physical and injury evaluations
- Drug screening
- Cybex test
- Wonderlic test

Sports writers question whether these tests have any relationship with NFL performance. Empirical research published in 2011 found that the 40-yard dash, vertical jump, 20-yard shuttle, and 3 cone drill tests have limited validity in predicting future NFL performance, suggesting that a prospect's past performance in college is a better indicator of future NFL performance than these physical ability tests.

=== 20-yard shuttle ===
The 20-yard shuttle, also simply called the short shuttle, is a timed agility drill run primarily to evaluate athletes' quickness and change-of-direction ability. Although not as highly regarded as the 40-yard dash, it is still an important measure used by NFL personnel to compare players. Canadian football also uses the shuttle test.

The name is derived from the total yards that athletes travel during the drill, also known as the "short shuttle" or the "5–10–5" drill." The athlete starts at the center of three cones set 5 yards apart. On the command of "Go" they drive off their dominant leg in the opposite direction, touch the line 5 yards away, reverse direction and shuttle to the opposite line then 10 yards away, then reverse the final 5 yards back to the center.

Three attempts are allowed, with the best time selected for the record.

The drill is designed to measure short-area quickness, lateral movement, flexibility and the speed at which a player can change directions. The drill also gives scouts an idea of how well a player can keep a low center of gravity as well as their ability to sink their hips.

=== Bench press ===
At the NFL combine, the bench press is used as a test of muscle strength and stamina, in which athletes lift 225 pounds (102 kg) as many times as possible.

Since 1994, only 20 players at the combine have managed to achieve more than 40 repetitions:

- 51 reps: Justin Ernest (1999)
- 49 reps: Stephen Paea (2011)
- 45 reps: Mike Kudla (2006), Mitch Petrus (2010), and Leif Larsen (2000)
- 44 reps: Brodrick Bunkley (2006), Jeff Owens (2010), Dontari Poe (2012), and Netane Muti (2020)
- 43 reps: Larry Allen (1994), Scott Young (2005)
- 42 reps: Isaac Sopoaga (2004), Tank Tyler (2007), Russell Bodine (2014), Harrison Phillips (2018)
- 41 reps: Igor Olshansky (2004), Terna Nande (2006), David Molk (2012), Jordan Roos (2017), and Vita Vea (2018)

== Scouting organizations ==
The NFL's first scouting organization, LESTO (Lions, Eagles and Steelers Talent Organization), was started in 1963 by the teams mentioned in its name with headquarters in Pittsburgh, Pennsylvania. It became BLESTO when the Bears joined the following year and BLESTO-V when the Vikings came on board later in the decade; by 1971 the Bills, Colts and Dolphins had joined and the group was known as BLESTO-VIII. It is now known simply as BLESTO despite the fact that the Bears and Eagles are no longer members. The group's offices stayed in Pittsburgh until 2007 when the headquarters moved to Jacksonville, Florida, with support offices remaining in Pittsburgh.

CEPO (Central Eastern Personnel Organization), formed in 1964, was a joint venture of the Colts, Browns, Packers and Cardinals. Its name was changed to United Scouting after the Falcons, Giants and Redskins joined, then to National Football Scouting in 1983 to avoid confusion with the United States Football League, which began operations that year. National Football Scouting is now known simply as the National. Another scouting organization formed in 1964 was Troika, launched by the Cowboys, Rams and 49ers. It was renamed Quadra when the Saints joined in 1967. Quadra no longer exists; its former members now all belong to the National.

== Combine invitations ==
In a typical year, there are about 330 invited players. About 250 invitations are sent before bowl games are completed to those who have completed their seasons. However, underclassmen have until mid-January to confirm their draft status. Invitations are made to those receiving supermajority support from the selection committee.

== Criticism ==
Sportswriter Steve Silverman has expressed skepticism of the combine's utility as a predictor of players' potential by citing the experience of Terrell Suggs in 2003. Suggs was an impressive defensive end for Arizona State, but when Suggs ran the 40-yard dash in a relatively slow 4.83 seconds, he was downgraded by NFL scouts. However, despite his lackluster performance at the NFL combine, Suggs later became an elite defender for the Baltimore Ravens after being selected with the tenth overall pick, including 12.0 sacks during his rookie season. Doug Tatum of Times-Picayune argues that it is unlikely players will be asked to run a 40-yard dash again during their career. Silverman says that the best way to scout is to simply watch them play.

Others think the value in the 40 depends on the position; Daniel Jeremiah, an NFL Network analyst and former scout, says "The position where the 40 holds the most weight is cornerback. If you're a receiver who runs a 4.6 like (Anquan) Boldin, but you have short-area quickness and strong hands, the 40 isn't a big deal. But if you're a cornerback who runs a 4.6 and you're facing a receiver who runs a 4.4, it doesn't matter how good your ball skills are."

== Television ==
The NFL scouting combine was first shown on television in 2004. Media and cameras were historically prohibited, but with the launch of NFL Network on November 4, 2003, six installments of one-hour shows to recap the day's events aired in February 2004. NFL Network aired two hours of combine workouts for each workout day in 2005, 26 total hours of coverage in 2006, 27 hours in 2007, and 25 hours in 2009. It began airing over 30 hours of Combine coverage starting in 2010, which received 5.24 million viewers.

In 2019, ESPN began to additionally provide live coverage from the Combine, with daily broadcasts of NFL Live on-site, including a two-hour edition airing on ABC with coverage of quarterback and wide receiver drills (marking the first time that official coverage had been provided outside of NFL Network).

== Regional combines ==
Beginning in 2011, a series of eleven regional combines for players not invited to the main scouting combine, as well as other free agents, were held in eight cities (Los Angeles, Houston, Baltimore, Tampa, East Rutherford, Chicago, Atlanta, and Cleveland) from January to March. The best players from these regional combines were invited to the NFL super regional combine at Ford Field in Detroit in late March. In 2016, the NFL went away from this format only holding five Combines in Houston, Arizona, Baltimore, Minnesota and New Orleans.

== Veteran combine ==
The first NFL Veteran Combine was scheduled on March 22, 2015, at the Arizona Cardinals' team facility. The combine corresponded with the NFL owners' meetings also being held in Phoenix from March 22–24, 2015. The combine featured veteran free agents, and all 32 clubs in attendance. There were over 2,000 applications from players to participate, although only a select few were chosen. Some of the notable players included Adam Carriker, Felix Jones, Michael Sam, and Brady Quinn. However, only two players participating in the combine (linebacker Brandon Copeland and tight end Ifeanyi Momah) were still on NFL rosters by Week 1 of the 2015 regular season.

The NFL cancelled the planned 2016 Veteran Combine, citing a lack of player interest. Later that year, the NFL announced it would rebrand it as the Pro Player Combine and focus its attention on younger players trying to get another chance in the NFL.
