= 2010 Alabama Crimson Tide football team =

American college football season

2010 Alabama Crimson Tide football

Capital One Bowl champion

Capital One Bowl, W 49–7 vs. Michigan State
- Conference: Southeastern Conference
- Western Division

Ranking
- Coaches: No. 11
- AP: No. 10
- Record: 10–3 (5–3 SEC)
- Head coach: Nick Saban (4th season)
- Offensive coordinator: Jim McElwain (3rd season)
- Offensive scheme: Multiple pro-style
- Defensive coordinator: Kirby Smart (3rd season)
- Base defense: 3–4
- MVP: Julio Jones
- Captains: Mark Barron; Dont'a Hightower; Greg McElroy
- Home stadium: Bryant–Denny Stadium

2010 Southeastern Conference football standings
	Conf.			Overall
Team	W		L	W		L
Eastern Division
No. 22 South Carolina x	5	–	3	9	–	5
Florida	4	–	4	8	–	5
Georgia	3	–	5	6	–	7
Tennessee	3	–	5	6	–	7
Kentucky	2	–	6	6	–	7
Vanderbilt	1	–	7	2	–	10
Western Division
No. 1 Auburn x$#	8	–	0	14	–	0
No. 12 Arkansas %	6	–	2	10	–	3
No. 8 LSU	6	–	2	11	–	2
No. 10 Alabama	5	–	3	10	–	3
No. 15 Mississippi State	4	–	4	9	–	4
Ole Miss*	1	–	7	4	–	8
Championship: Auburn 56, South Carolina 17
# – BCS National Champion; $ – BCS representative as conference champion; % – BCS at-large representative; x – Division champion/co-champions; * Ole Miss vacated all wins due to NCAA violations.; Rankings from AP Poll

The 2010 Alabama Crimson Tide football team represented the University of Alabama as a member of the Southeastern Conference (SEC) during the 2010 NCAA Division I FBS football season. Led by fourth-year head coach Nick Saban, the Crimson Tide compiled an overall record of 10–3 with a mark of 5–3 in conference play, placing fourth in the SEC's Western Division. Alabama was invited to the Capital One Bowl, where the Crimson Tide defeated Michigan State. The team played home games at Bryant–Denny Stadium in Tuscaloosa, Alabama.

Alabama entered the season as the defending national champion and the preseason number one team in both the AP and Coaches Polls. Favored to win a second consecutive SEC championship and contend for the national championship, the Crimson Tide opened the season with five consecutive victories. However, Alabama completed the regular season at 9–3 with and losses to South Carolina, LSU, and the eventual national champion, Auburn. With a win over Big Ten co-champion Michigan State in Capital One Bowl, Alabama secured a ten-win season and top-ten finish for the third straight year.

== Schedule ==
The 2010 schedule was officially released on September 2, 2009. In accordance with conference rules, Alabama faced all five Western Division opponents: Arkansas, Auburn, LSU, Mississippi State, and Ole Miss. They also faced three Eastern Division opponents: official SEC rival Tennessee, Florida, and South Carolina. Alabama did not play SEC opponents Georgia, Kentucky and Vanderbilt. The contest against Ole Miss served as the 2010 homecoming game.

Alabama also played four non-conference games. The game against Penn State was originally scheduled as part of the 2004 season, however the series was moved back at the request of Alabama due to fallout from NCAA sanctions being levied on the program. The non-conference schedule also included games against San Jose State of the Western Athletic Conference, Duke of the Atlantic Coast Conference and Georgia State of the Football Championship Subdivision (FCS). On December 5, it was announced Alabama would face Big Ten co-champion Michigan State in the Capital One Bowl. In what was the first meeting between the programs, the Tide defeated the Spartans 49–7 and secured their third consecutive ten-win season.

Alabama played six of its SEC opponents the week following the opponents' bye week. These SEC teams who scheduled a bye week before facing the Crimson Tide included South Carolina, Ole Miss, Tennessee, LSU, Mississippi State and Auburn. Georgia State also had a bye week prior to playing Alabama, for a total of seven consecutive opponents playing Alabama the week following their bye. On July 1, 2010, the game against Georgia State was moved from Saturday, November 20 to Thursday, November 18 to give Alabama additional time to prepare for its game against Auburn. The Sagarin computer ratings calculated Alabama's 2010 strength of schedule to be the fifth most difficult out of the 245 Division I teams. The Cosgrove Computer Rankings calculated it as the 12th most difficult out of the 120 Division I FBS teams in its rankings.

Date	Time	Opponent	Rank	Site	TV	Result	Attendance
September 4	6:00 p.m.	San Jose State*	No. 1	Bryant–Denny Stadium; Tuscaloosa, AL	PPV/ESPN3	W 48–3	101,821
September 11	6:00 p.m.	No. 18 Penn State*	No. 1	Bryant–Denny Stadium; Tuscaloosa, AL (rivalry, College GameDay)	ESPN	W 24–3	101,821
September 18	2:30 p.m.	at Duke*	No. 1	Wallace Wade Stadium; Durham, NC	ABC	W 62–13	39,042
September 25	2:30 p.m.	at No. 10 Arkansas	No. 1	Donald W. Reynolds Razorback Stadium; Fayetteville, AR	CBS	W 24–20	76,808
October 2	7:00 p.m.	No. 7 Florida	No. 1	Bryant–Denny Stadium; Tuscaloosa, AL (rivalry)	CBS	W 31–6	101,821
October 9	2:30 p.m.	at No. 19 South Carolina	No. 1	Williams–Brice Stadium; Columbia, SC (College GameDay)	CBS	L 21–35	82,993
October 16	8:15 p.m.	Ole Miss^{†}	No. 8	Bryant–Denny Stadium; Tuscaloosa, AL (rivalry)	ESPN2	W 23–10	101,821
October 23	6:00 p.m.	at Tennessee	No. 7	Neyland Stadium; Knoxville, TN (Third Saturday in October)	ESPN	W 41–10	102,455
November 6	2:30 p.m.	at No. 10 LSU	No. 5	Tiger Stadium; Baton Rouge, LA (rivalry)	CBS	L 21–24	92,969
November 13	6:15 p.m.	No. 17 Mississippi State	No. 11	Bryant–Denny Stadium; Tuscaloosa, AL (rivalry)	ESPN2	W 30–10	101,821
November 18	6:30 p.m.	Georgia State*	No. 10	Bryant–Denny Stadium; Tuscaloosa, AL	ESPNU	W 63–7	101,821
November 26	1:30 p.m.	No. 2 Auburn	No. 11	Bryant–Denny Stadium; Tuscaloosa, AL (Iron Bowl)	CBS	L 27–28	101,821
January 1, 2011	Noon	vs. No. 7 Michigan State*	No. 15	Florida Citrus Bowl; Orlando, FL (Capital One Bowl)	ESPN	W 49–7	61,519
*Non-conference game; ^{†}Homecoming; Rankings from AP Poll released prior to the game; All times are in Central time

== Rankings ==
Entering the 2010 season, the Crimson Tide was ranked No. 1 in the AP and Coaches' Preseason Polls. The No. 1 preseason ranking was the first for Alabama since the 1978 season. In week six, Alabama dropped to the No. 8 ranking in both the AP and Coaches' Poll following their loss to South Carolina. The Tide rebounded in the rankings though week nine, rising to No. 5 before dropping to No. 11 in the AP and No. 12 in the Coaches' Poll following their loss at LSU. After their loss to Auburn, Alabama dropped to No. 15 in the AP, No. 18 in the Coaches' Poll and No. 16 in the final BCS standings. Following the victory over Michigan State in the Capital One Bowl, Alabama finished No. 10 in the final AP, No. 11 in the final Coaches' Polls.

Ranking movements Legend: ██ Increase in ranking ██ Decrease in ranking ( ) = First-place votes
	Week															
Poll	Pre	1	2	3	4	5	6	7	8	9	10	11	12	13	14	Final
AP	1 (54)	1 (47)	1 (52)	1 (53)	1 (57)	1 (58)	8	7	6	5	11	10	9	17	15	10
Coaches	1 (55)	1 (55)	1 (55)	1 (55)	1 (57)	1 (57)	8	7	6	5	12	12	11	19	18	11
Harris	Not released						8	7	6	5	11	11	11	18	16	Not released
BCS	Not released							8	7	6	12	11	11	16	16	Not released

== Before the season ==
During the 2009 campaign, the Crimson Tide finished the season undefeated, 14–0, with wins over several ranked opponents that included No. 7 Virginia Tech, No. 20 Ole Miss, No. 22 South Carolina, No. 9 LSU, No. 1 Florida in the SEC Championship, and No. 2 Texas in the BCS National Championship Game. They finished the season as the consensus National Champions, being voted No. 1 in the AP and Coaches' Polls in securing Alabama's first national title since 1992. In addition to the national title, sophomore running back Mark Ingram II became the first Alabama player to win the Heisman Trophy.

In February 2010, eighteen players each signed an individual National Letter of Intent to play college football at Alabama. The 2010 recruiting class was ranked nationally in the top five by several recruiting services including Rivals, Scout, ESPNU and CBS College Sports. Spring practice began on March 12 and concluded with the annual A-Day game on April 17. Televised live by ESPN, the Crimson team of offensive starters defeated the White team of defensive starters by a final score of 23–17 before 91,312 fans in Bryant–Denny Stadium. The game was decided after the end of regulation when Brandon Gibson caught a 39-yard touchdown pass from A. J. McCarron in sudden death. For their performances, Marcell Dareus earned the Dwight Stephenson Lineman of the A-Day Game Award and Mark Ingram earned the Dixie Howell Memorial Most Valuable Player of the A-Day Game Award.

By August, Alabama had a combined 21 players on 12 different preseason award watch lists. These included both Mark Barron, Marcell Dareus and Don't’a Hightower for the Chuck Bednarik Award; Julio Jones for the Fred Biletnikoff Award; Hightower and Nico Johnson for the Butkus Award; Ingram for the Walter Camp Award; James Carpenter, Dareus and Hightower for the Lombardi Award; Ingram and Greg McElroy for the Maxwell Award; Barron, Dareus and Hightower for the Bronko Nagurski Trophy; McElroy for the Davey O'Brien Award; Carpenter and Barrett Jones for the Outland Trophy; William Vlachos for the Rimington Trophy; Barron for the Jim Thorpe Award; and Ingram for the Doak Walker Award.

=== Returning starters ===
Alabama had 10 returning starters from the previous season, including eight on offense and two on defense. The most notable departures from the previous year were linebackers Eryk Anders, Rolando McClain and Cory Reamer; cornerbacks Javier Arenas, Kareem Jackson and Marquis Johnson; defensive ends Brandon Deaderick and Lorenzo Washington; nose tackle Terrence Cody; safety Justin Woodall; offensive linemen Drew Davis and Mike Johnson; and tight end Colin Peek. Additionally, all of special teams players were replaced following the departures of punter P.J. Fitzgerald, placekicker Leigh Tiffin, long snapper Brian Selman and Arenas as the return specialist.

Offense

Player	Class	Position
Greg McElroy	Senior	Quarterback
Mark Ingram II	Junior	Running back
Julio Jones	Junior	Wide receiver
Marquis Maze	Junior	Wide receiver
Darius Hanks	Junior	Wide receiver
Preston Dial	Senior	Tight end
James Carpenter	Senior	Left tackle
Chance Warmack	Sophomore	Left guard
William Vlachos	Junior	Center
Barrett Jones	Sophomore	Right guard
D. J. Fluker	Freshman	Right tackle

Defense

Player	Class	Position
Josh Chapman	Junior	Nose guard
Marcell Dareus	Junior	Defensive end
Luther Davis	Senior	Defensive end
Dont'a Hightower	Sophomore	Linebacker
Courtney Upshaw	Junior	Linebacker
Nico Johnson	Sophomore	Linebacker
Jerrell Harris	Junior	Linebacker
Dre Kirkpatrick	Sophomore	Cornerback
Robert Lester	Sophomore	Safety
Mark Barron	Junior	Safety

== Game summaries ==
=== San Jose State ===
Team	1	2	3	4	Total
San Jose State	3	0	0	0	3
• #1 Alabama	14	17	10	7	48

- Location: Tuscaloosa, Alabama
- Game start: 6:08 p.m.
- Elapsed time: 2:50
- Game attendance: 101,821
- Game weather: 81 °F (27 °C), Sunny
- Referee: Penn Wagers
- TV announcers (CTSN): Chris Stewart (play-by-play), Tyler Watts (color), Barry Krauss (sideline)

The Crimson Tide began their defense of their 2010 BCS championship at home against the San Jose State Spartans, and before a record crowd in a newly expanded Bryant–Denny Stadium, Alabama was victorious 48–3. Alabama scored a touchdown on their first possession on a one-yard Trent Richardson run to complete an eight-play, 71-yard drive. The Spartans responded on the next drive with their only points of the game on a 31-yard Harrison Waid field goal to make the score 7–3. On the ensuing drive the Alabama extended their lead to 14–3 with a 48-yard Greg McElroy touchdown pass to Marquis Maze. Alabama again reached the endzone early in the second quarter on a 39-yard Richardson run and a 29-yard A. J. McCarron pass to Julio Jones to make the score 28–3. Cade Foster scored the final points of the half as time expired on a 31-yard field goal to bring the halftime score to 31–3.

Alabama opened the second half by scoring on their first two possessions. Eddie Lacy scored on a 37-yard run and Foster hit a 24-yard field goal to extend the Crimson Tide lead to 41–3. Lacy scored the final points of the game with a 10-yard run to make the final score 48–3. Both McElroy and McCarron combined to pass for 334 yards on 22 completions and a pair of touchdowns. For the game, the Alabama outgained San Jose in total offense by a margin of 591–175. The 101,821 in attendance marked the first crowd of over 100,000 to attend a football game in the state of Alabama.

=== Penn State ===
Team	1	2	3	4	Total
#18 Penn State	0	0	0	3	3
• #1 Alabama	7	10	0	7	24

- Location: Bryant–Denny Stadium, Tuscaloosa, Alabama
- Game start: 6:12 p.m.
- Elapsed time: 3:03
- Game attendance: 101,821
- Game weather: 88 °F (31 °C), Cloudy
- Referee: Dave Witvoet
- TV announcers (ESPN): Brent Musburger (play-by-play), Kirk Herbstreit (color), Erin Andrews (sideline)

Scoring summary
1	8:35	ALA	Kevin Norwood 36-yard pass from Greg McElroy (Jeremy Shelley kick)	ALA 7-0
2	14:55	ALA	Preston Dial 14-yard pass from Greg McElroy (Jeremy Shelley kick)	ALA 14-0
2	3:54	ALA	Jeremy Shelley 31-yard field goal	ALA 17-0
4	14:10	ALA	Trent Richardson 1-yard run (Jeremy Shelley kick)	ALA 24-0
4	9:47	PSU	Collin Wagner 36-yard field goal	ALA 24-3

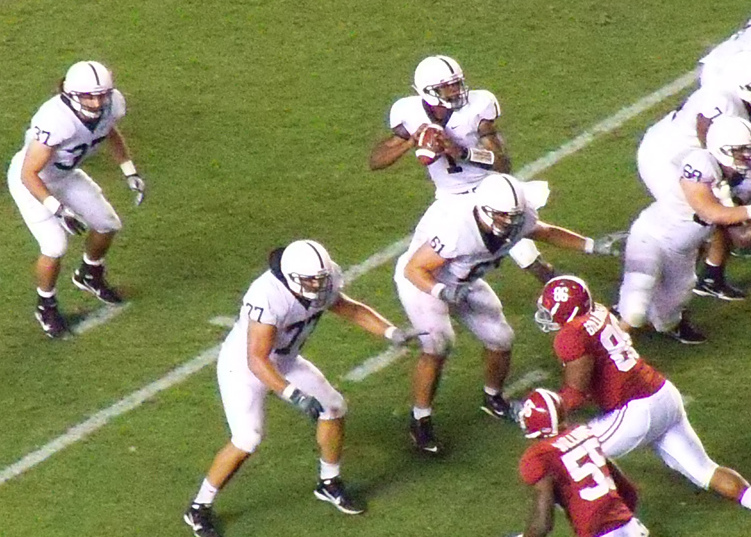
Chavis Williams and Undra Billingsley on the line

With ESPN's College GameDay in town, Alabama defeated the Penn State Nittany Lions 24–3 in a renewal of their historic rivalry. Alabama scored first on a 36-yard touchdown pass from Greg McElroy to Kevin Norwood in the first quarter. The Crimson Tide added to their lead in the second quarter with a 14-yard McElroy touchdown pass to Preston Dial and a 31-yard Jeremy Shelley field goal to take a 17–0 lead at the half. After a scoreless third, Trent Richardson scored on a one-yard run and Penn State's Collin Wagner hit a 36-yard field goal to make the final score to 24–3.

Richardson led the team in rushing with 144 yards on 22 carries, and was also the first back to gain over 100 yards on the ground against Penn State since their 2008 game against Iowa. The defense also stood out with Mark Barron, Robert Lester and Will Lowery each making an interception and Alabama only allowing 283 yards of total offense. After compiling 207 all-purpose yards and scoring a touchdown, Richardson was named Co-SEC Offensive Player of the Week with South Carolina's Marcus Lattimore. The victory improved Alabama's all-time record against the Nittany Lions to 9–5.

=== Duke ===
Team	1	2	3	4	Total
• #1 Alabama	28	17	10	7	62
Duke	3	10	0	0	13

- Location: Durham, North Carolina
- Game start: 2:36 p.m.
- Elapsed time: 3:26
- Game attendance: 39,042
- Game weather: 83 °F (28 °C), Sunny
- Referee: Matt Austin
- TV announcers (ABC): Beth Mowins (play-by-play), Ray Bentley (color), Jenn Brown (sideline)

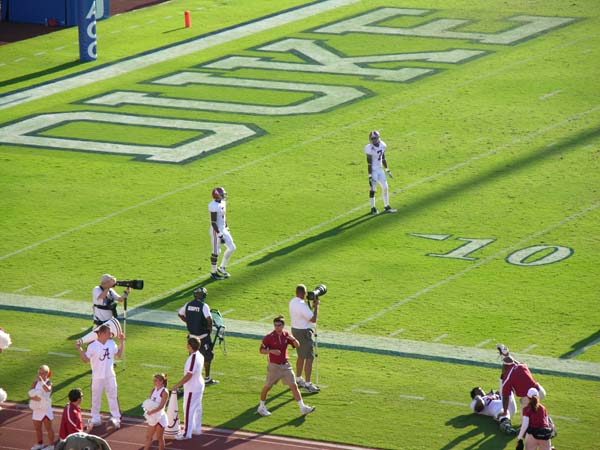
Tana Patrick and Kenny Bell wait to receive a kickoff in the second half.

In Alabama's first-ever trip to Duke, the Crimson Tide defeated the Blue Devils by a final score of 62–13 in front of the largest crowd at Wallace Wade Stadium since the 1994 season. Playing in his first game of the 2010 season following knee surgery, Mark Ingram II ran for a team high 152 yards on nine carries with two touchdowns.

Greg McElroy completed 14 of 20 passes for 258 yards, with three touchdowns and one interception. In the second quarter Trent Richardson scored Alabama's first special teams touchdown of the season with a 96-yard kickoff return. Other offensive highlights included Richardson gaining 66 yards on seven carries and Eddie Lacy gaining 53 yards on seven carries with each scoring a touchdown on the ground. Through the air, Julio Jones led the team with 106 receiving yards on six catches with he, Darius Hanks and Preston Dial each making a touchdown reception.

The game also marked the return of Marcell Dareus following a two-game suspension from the NCAA for receiving improper benefits. After allowing 13 points in the first half, the Alabama defense shut out the Duke offense in the second half. The 62 points scored by the Tide were the most since a 62–0 victory over Tulane during the 1991 season, and the 45 points scored in the first half were the most scored in one half since scoring 45 in the second half of the 1973 victory over California. The 626 yards of total offense were the most amassed by an Alabama team since gaining 644 against LSU in 1989. The victory improved Alabama's all-time record against the Blue Devils to 3–1.

=== Arkansas ===
Team	1	2	3	4	Total
• #1 Alabama	7	0	7	10	24
#10 Arkansas	10	7	3	0	20

- Location: Fayetteville, Arkansas
- Game start: 2:38 p.m.
- Elapsed time: 3:22
- Game attendance: 76,808 (stadium attendance record)
- Game weather: 74 °F (23 °C), partly cloudy
- Referee: Matt Moore
- TV announcers (CBS): Verne Lundquist (play-by-play), Gary Danielson (color), Tracy Wolfson (sideline)

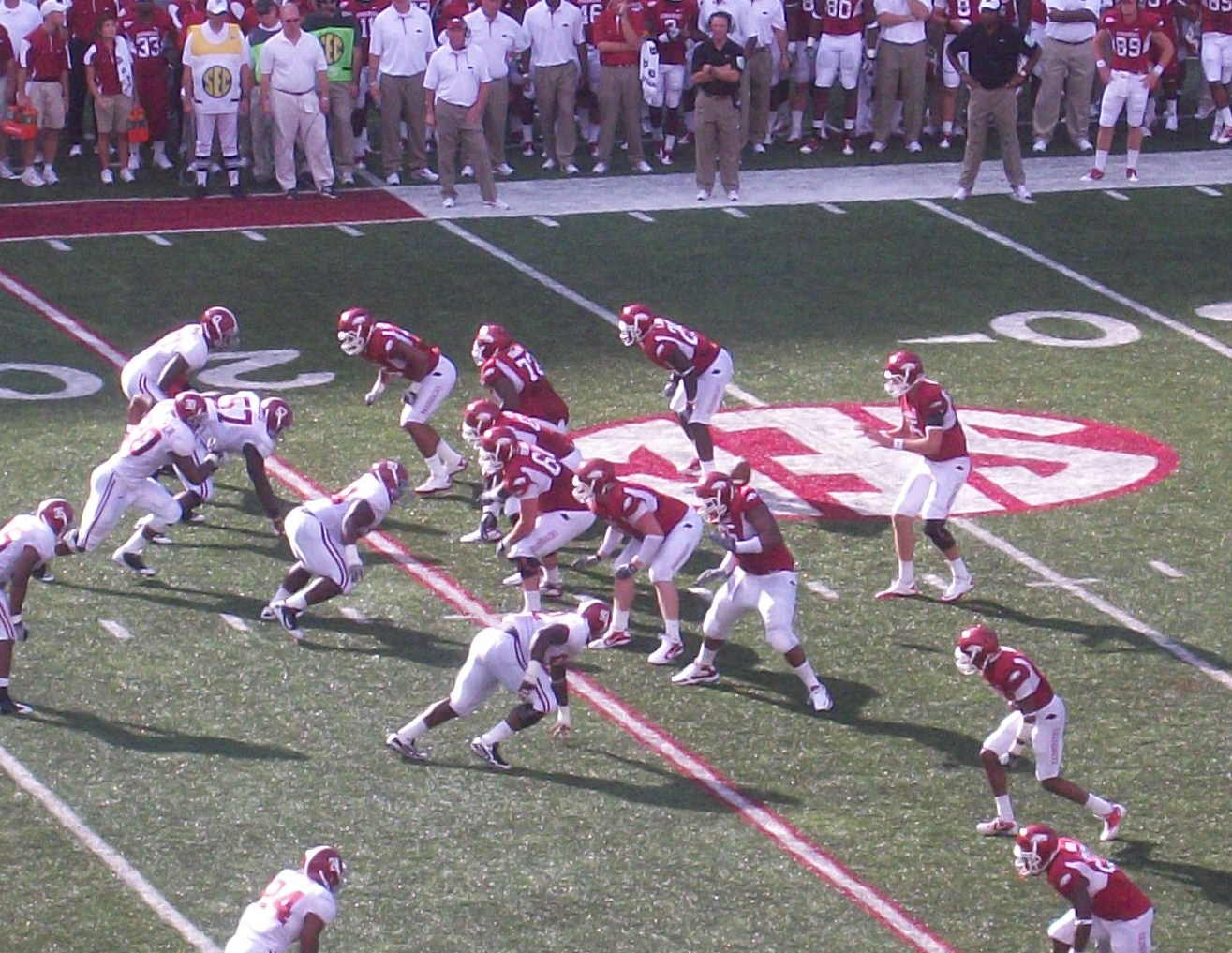
Arkansas quarterback Ryan Mallett takes a snap in the shotgun in the third quarter.

In the first game played between two teams ranked in the top ten at Donald W. Reynolds Razorback Stadium since the 1979 season, Alabama was victorious with a 24–20 come-from-behind victory. After Ryan Mallett connected on an early touchdown to take a 7–0 lead, Alabama responded with a 54-yard Mark Ingram touchdown run to tie the game at 7–7. Arkansas retook the lead with a field goal and a one-yard Mallett run to take a 17–7 lead at the half. Midway through the third, Arkansas extended their lead to 20–7.

Alabama brought the score to 20–14 late in the third after a 20-yard Trent Richardson touchdown reception from Greg McElroy. The Arkansas lead was then cut to three after a 36-yard Jeremy Shelley field goal with just over 6:00 remaining in the fourth. After Robert Lester intercepted a Mallett pass and returned it to the 12-yard line, Ingram took the next three snaps that culminated in a one-yard touchdown run to take a 24–20 lead. After a late Dre Kirkpatrick interception, McElroy gained a first down on a fourth and inches quarterback sneak to seal the victory for the Crimson Tide. Ingram led the team with 157 yards rushing on 24 carries and Richardson finished with 85 yards on eight carries. Kirkpatrick led the defense with nine tackles and an interception. For his five-tackle, two-interception performance, Robert Lester was recognized as both the FWAA/Bronko Nagurski National Defensive Player of the Week and the SEC Defensive Player of the Week. The victory improved Alabama's all-time record against the Razorbacks to 11–8 (14–7 without NCAA vacations and forfeits).

=== Florida ===
Team	1	2	3	4	Total
#7 Florida	0	3	3	0	6
• #1 Alabama	3	21	7	0	31

- Location: Tuscaloosa, Alabama
- Game start: 7:10 p.m.
- Elapsed time: 2:59
- Game attendance: 101,821
- Game weather: 71 °F (22 °C), Clear
- Referee: Tom Ritter
- TV announcers (CBS): Verne Lundquist (play-by-play), Gary Danielson (color), Tracy Wolfson (sideline)

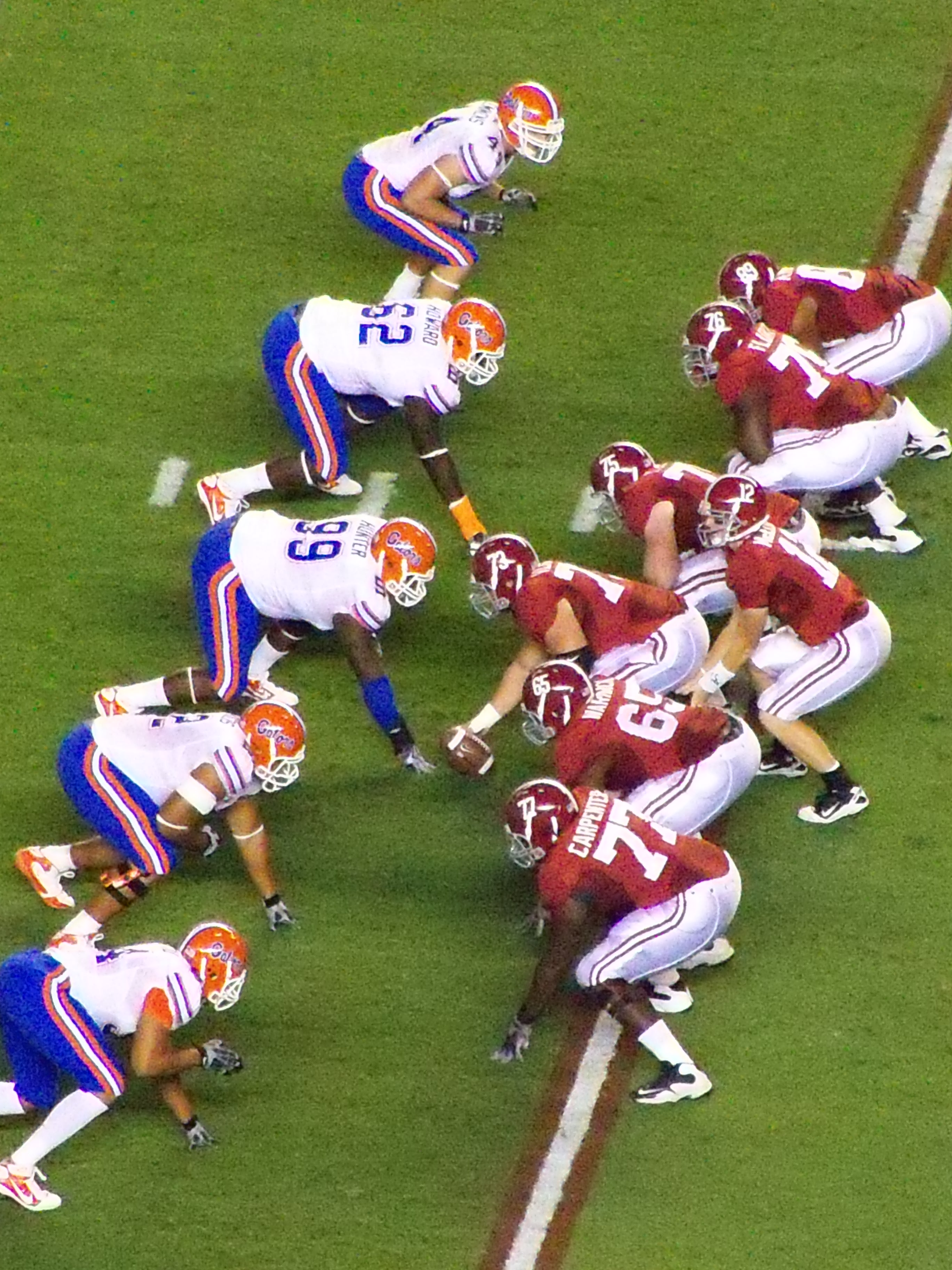
Alabama lines up on offense

In a rematch of the previous two SEC Championship Games, Alabama defeated the Florida Gators 31–6. Alabama opened the scoring with a 28-yard Jeremy Shelley field goal in the first, and then scored a trio of second-quarter touchdowns. Mark Ingram scored on runs of six and one—yard with the third coming on a 19-yard Marquis Maze touchdown pass to Michael Williams on a wide receiver pass. Florida got on the board late in the second with a 39-yard Chas Henry field goal to bring the halftime score to 24–3. After a second Henry field goal, C. J. Mosley returned an interception 35-yards for a touchdown to make the final score 31–6.

Although Florida outgained the Crimson Tide in total offense 281 to 273 yards, their three turnovers resulted in 21 Alabama points. In addition to Mosley, Nico Johnson intercepted Trey Burton in the end zone and Dre Kirkpatrick intercepted a John Brantley pass. The game marked the first time Florida had been held without a touchdown since their previous visit to Tuscaloosa in 2005, and resulted in Alabama leading the nation in scoring defense by allowing only 45 points through five games. Courtney Upshaw was named the SEC Defensive Player of the Week after making seven total tackles, with four for losses, a fumble recovery and two pass deflections. Chance Warmack was recognized as the SEC's Offensive Lineman of the Week for his performance. The victory improved Alabama's all-time record against the Gators to 21–14 (22–14 without the NCAA vacation of the 2005 victory).

=== South Carolina ===
Team	1	2	3	4	Total
#1 Alabama	3	6	5	7	21
• #19 South Carolina	14	7	7	7	35

- Location: Columbia, South Carolina
- Game start: 2:30 p.m.
- Elapsed time: 3:25
- Game attendance: 82,993
- Game weather: 84 °F (29 °C), Sunny
- Referee: Matt Moore
- TV announcers (CBS): Verne Lundquist (play-by-play), Gary Danielson (color), Tracy Wolfson (sideline)

With ESPN's College GameDay in town and in front of a sold out Williams–Brice, Alabama was upset by the South Carolina Gamecocks 35–21. After Alabama scored on its opening drive with a 32-yard Jeremy Shelley field goal, South Carolina responded with three consecutive touchdowns. Stephen Garcia threw three touchdown passes, with the first to Marcus Lattimore for nine-yards followed by strikes of 26 and 15-yards to Alshon Jeffery, to give South Carolina a 21–3 lead in the second quarter. Alabama reached the end zone late in the second on a nine-yard Greg McElroy pass to Julio Jones to make the halftime score 21–9 after the extra point failed.

On the first play from scrimmage in the third quarter, Garcia threw the ball out of the end zone for a safety following a bad snap. After the free kick, Alabama scored on a 39-yard Shelley field goal, to make the score 21–14. After a one-yard Lattimore touchdown run, Alabama answered with a 51-yard Darius Hanks touchdown reception from McElroy, to make the score 28–21. However, Lattimore scored on a two-yard touchdown run late in the fourth to give the Gamecocks a 35–21 victory. The win marked South Carolina's first all-time victory over a team ranked number one in the AP poll.

For the game, McElroy set a career-high in passing for 315 yards on 27 of 34 passes, and Jones had a team high 118 yards on eight catches. Marcell Dareus was recognized as an honorable mention SEC Defensive Player of the Week for his eight tackle performance. The 35 points allowed by the Crimson Tide defense were the most allowed since giving up 41 to LSU in 2007. The loss also marked the end of a 29-game regular season win streak, an overall 19-game win streak, and an 18-game regular season conference winning streak. It was Alabama's first overall loss since being defeated by Utah in the 2009 Sugar Bowl and their first regular season and regular season conference loss since losing to Auburn in 2007. The loss brought Alabama's all-time record against the Gamecocks to 10–4 (12–3 without NCAA vacations and forfeits).

=== Ole Miss ===
Team	1	2	3	4	Total
Ole Miss	0	3	7	0	10
• #8 Alabama	10	6	7	0	23

- Location: Tuscaloosa, Alabama
- Game start: 8:15 p.m.
- Elapsed time: 3:18
- Game attendance: 101,821
- Game weather: 62 °F (17 °C), Clear
- Referee: Matt Austin
- TV announcers (ESPN2): Brad Nessler (play-by-play), Todd Blackledge (color), Holly Rowe (sideline)

A week after their first regular season loss since the 2007 season, Alabama defeated their long-time rival, the Ole Miss Rebels on homecoming in Tuscaloosa 23–10. The Crimson Tide took a 10–0 lead in the first quarter on a seven-yard Greg McElroy touchdown pass to Preston Dial and a 49-yard Cade Foster field goal. Scoring continued in the second quarter with Alabama's Jeremy Shelley and Foster connecting on field goals of 19 and 44-yards. Mississippi's Bryson Rose connected on a 22-yard field goal to make the halftime score 16–3. In the third quarter, McElroy connected with Trent Richardson for an 85-yard touchdown reception. The catch was the fourth longest touchdown reception in school history. Later in the quarter, Jeremiah Masoli connected with Melvin Harris on a 15-yard touchdown reception to make the final score 23–10.

On special teams, Marquis Maze totaled 125 yards on six punt returns and was named SEC Co-Special Teams Player of the Week for his performance. The victory improved Alabama's all-time record against the Rebels to 44–9–2 (48–8–2 without NCAA vacations and forfeits).

=== Tennessee ===
Third Saturday in October

Team	1	2	3	4	Total
• #7 Alabama	3	10	21	7	41
Tennessee	7	3	0	0	10

- Location: Knoxville, Tennessee
- Game start: 6:02 p.m.
- Elapsed time: 3:21
- Game attendance: 102,455
- Game weather: 69 °F (21 °C), Cloudy
- Referee: Hubert Owens
- TV announcers (ESPN): Brad Nessler (play-by-play), Todd Blackledge (color), Holly Rowe (sideline)

In the 93rd edition of the Third Saturday in October, the Crimson Tide defeated the Tennessee Volunteers 41–10. Tennessee scored first, on a 59-yard Tauren Poole touchdown run to take an early 7–0 lead. Alabama responded by scoring on its next two drives: a 36-yard Jeremy Shelley field goal, and a one-yard Greg McElroy touchdown run to take a 10–7 lead. The second quarter closed with a 42-yard Shelley field goal and a 33-yard field goal by Michael Palardy of Tennessee to make the halftime score 13–10.

Alabama opened the second half by driving 70 yards in four plays, with Julio Jones having receptions of 38 and 19 yards and Mark Ingram punching in the touchdown from one-yard out to extend their lead to 20–10. After Palardy missed a 52-yard field goal, Trent Richardson ran the ball 65 yards for a touchdown on the second play of the ensuing drive for a 27–10 Alabama lead. Later, Robert Lester intercepted a Matt Simms pass, and Alabama extended its lead to 34–10, after an 80-yard drive with Ingram scoring from one-yard out. Alabama scored the final points of the evening in the fourth quarter when A. J. McCarron hit Richardson for a five-yard touchdown reception to make the final score 41–10. It was Alabama's most lopsided victory over Tennessee since defeating the Volunteers 35–0 in 1963.

For the game, Julio Jones set a school record with 221 receiving yards, eclipsing the previous mark of 217 yards set by David Palmer against Vanderbilt in 1993. Ingram and Richardson finished with 88 and 119 yards on the ground respectively. For his performance, left tackle James Carpenter was selected as the SEC Offensive Lineman of the Week. With his 117 yards on 14 carries, Tauren Poole ended Alabama's 41-game streak of not allowing a 100-yard rusher dating back to BenJarvus Green-Ellis's 131 yard performance for Ole Miss in 2007. The game also marked the first between Nick Saban and Derek Dooley who previously worked for Saban as an assistant coach at LSU and with the Miami Dolphins. The victory improved Alabama's all-time record against the Volunteers to 47–38–7 (48–37–8 without NCAA vacations and forfeits).

=== LSU ===
Team	1	2	3	4	Total
#6 Alabama	0	7	7	7	21
• #12 LSU	3	0	7	14	24

- Location: Baton Rouge, Louisiana
- Game start: 2:37 pm
- Elapsed time: 3:29
- Game attendance: 92,969
- Game weather: 62°, Sunny
- Referee: Matt Austin
- TV announcers (CBS): Verne Lundquist (play-by-play), Gary Danielson (color), Tracy Wolfson (sideline)

Coming off their bye week and in what was dubbed by some as "Saban Bowl IV," Alabama was upset by their long-time rival, the LSU Tigers 24–21. LSU scored first on a 45-yard Josh Jasper field goal to take a 3–0 lead. Alabama scored their first points early in the second quarter on a one-yard Greg McElroy touchdown pass to Trent Richardson to take a 7–3 lead at the half.

Both teams traded touchdowns in the third. The Tigers scored first on a 75-yard Rueben Randle reception from Jordan Jefferson, and the Crimson Tide responded with a five-yard Mark Ingram touchdown run. LSU scored 14 fourth quarter points to secure the victory with a pair of Jasper field goals and a one-yard Stevan Ridley touchdown run and a successful two-point conversion. Alabama responded with a nine-yard Julio Jones touchdown reception, but was unable to get a defensive stop late in the game preserving the 24–21 LSU victory. Turnovers proved costly for Alabama with LSU scoring field goals on drives after a McElroy interception in the first and fumble in the fourth. The loss brought Alabama's all-time record against the Tigers to 45–24–5.

=== Mississippi State ===
Team	1	2	3	4	Total
#17 Mississippi State	3	0	0	7	10
• #11 Alabama	6	14	7	3	30

- Location: Tuscaloosa, Alabama
- Game start: 6:22 pm
- Elapsed time: 3:03
- Game attendance: 101,821
- Game weather: 64 °F (18 °C), Partly cloudy
- Referee: Ken Williamson
- TV announcers (ESPN2): Mark Jones (play-by-play), Bob Davie (color)

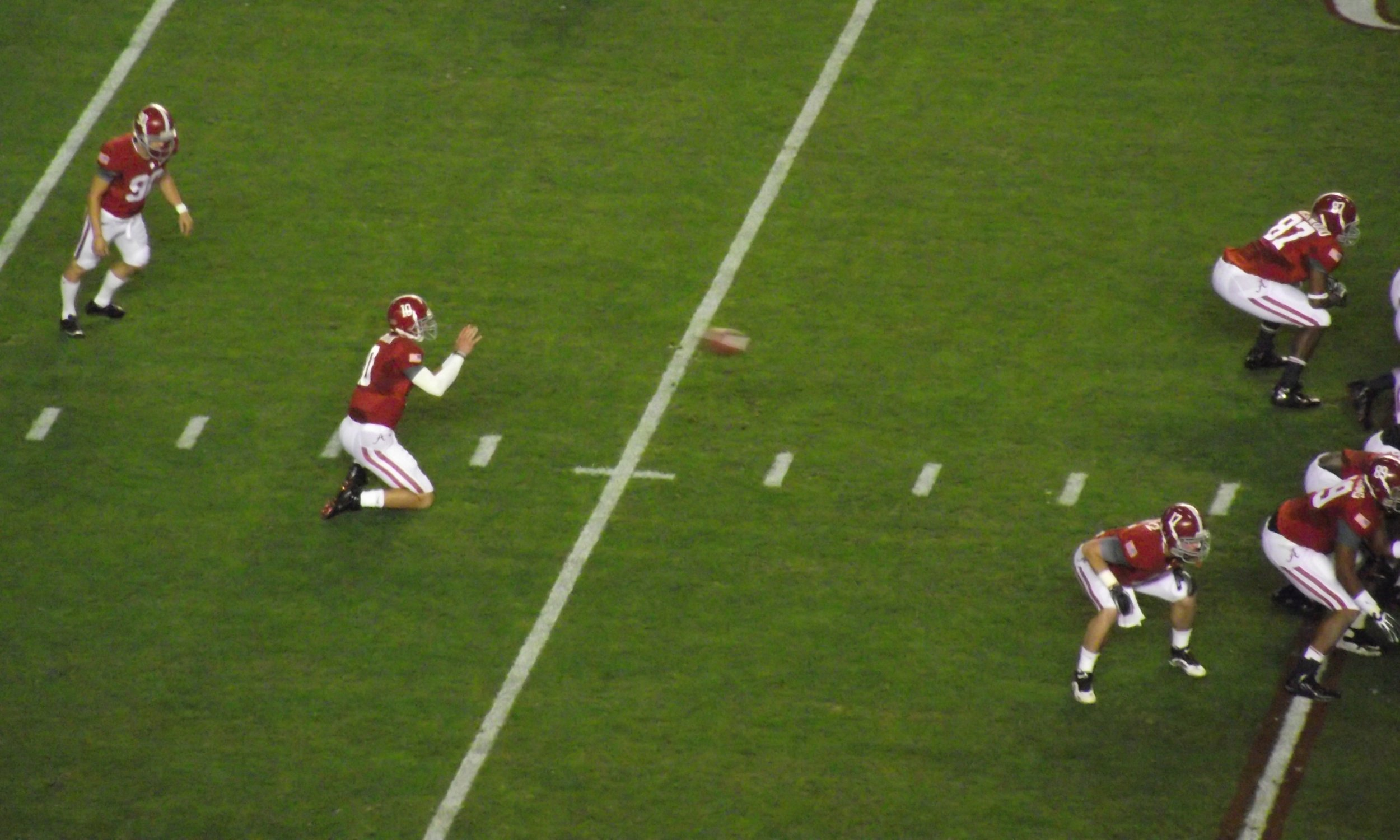
Jeremy Shelley made field goals from 36 and 28 yards.

A week after being upset by LSU, Alabama returned to Bryant–Denny and began a three-game homestand to end the season by defeating long-time rival Mississippi State 30–10. The Crimson Tide took a 6–3 lead in the first quarter by trading field goals with the Bulldogs on a 36-yarder from Jeremy Shelley, a 24-yarder from Derek DePasquale and a 45-yarder from Cade Foster. In the second, Alabama reached the end zone for the first time on the evening after Greg McElroy hit Marquis Maze for a 45-yard touchdown reception and a 13–3 lead. After a punt on the next Bulldog series, an 80-yard Maze touchdown return was called back as a result of an illegal block on the play by Alex Watkins. On the next play, Mark Ingram took a short bubble screen pass from McElroy 78-yards for a 20–3 lead at the half.

On their first offensive possession of the second half, and on the third consecutive offensive play, Alabama scored on a long touchdown play. This time Julio Jones ran the ball 56-yards for a touchdown to extend the Alabama lead to 27–3. Shelley scored Alabama's final points in the fourth on a 28-yard field goal with State scoring their lone touchdown late on a 27-yard Chad Bumphis touchdown reception from Tyler Russell. The Alabama defense allowed only 149 rushing yards, registered five sacks and two interceptions.

In this game, the Crimson Tide wore Nike Pro Combat uniforms for the first time. These uniforms featured crimson jerseys with grey and white houndstooth numbers, a houndstooth stripe on the helmet, houndstooth gloves and an American flag sewn into one of the sleeves in honor of Veterans Day. The houndstooth design was chosen as a tribute to former Alabama coach Bear Bryant who was known for wearing a houndstooth fedora during games. The victory improved Alabama's all-time record against the Bulldogs to 73–18–3 (75–17–3 without NCAA vacations and forfeits).

=== Georgia State ===
Team	1	2	3	4	Total
Georgia State	0	7	0	0	7
• #10 Alabama	14	28	14	7	63

- Location: Tuscaloosa, Alabama
- Game start: 6:34 p.m.
- Elapsed time: 3:00
- Game attendance: 101,821
- Game weather: 56 °F (13 °C), Clear
- Referee: Marc Curles
- TV announcers (ESPNU): Chris Fowler (play-by-play), Kirk Herbstreit & Desmond Howard (color); Erin Andrews (sideline)

Originally scheduled to be played on November 20, in July 2010 this game was moved to Thursday, November 18 to give the Crimson Tide extra time to prepare for its game against Auburn. In the first ever meeting against the Georgia State Panthers, the Crimson Tide was victorious 63–7. Alabama scored first on an eight-yard Greg McElroy pass to Julio Jones. After a Mark Barron interception ended the first Georgia State drive, Alabama responded with a 71-yard drive capped by a one-yard Mark Ingram touchdown run to take a 14–0 lead.

In the second quarter, Alabama scored on a defensive play when C. J. Mosley returned a Drew Little interception 41-yards for a touchdown. Alabama then extended their lead to 28–0 on a ten-yard Jones touchdown reception from McElroy. At the end of the Panthers next possession, Chavis Williams blocked a Bo Schlechter punt that was returned 22-yards for a touchdown by Brandon Gibson. On the following kickoff, an Albert Wilson fumble was recovered by Gibson to give the Tide possession deep in Panther territory. Four plays later, Alabama extended their lead to 42–0 on a three-yard Eddie Lacy touchdown run. On the ensuing kickoff, the Panthers scored their only points on the evening when Wilson returned the kickoff 97-yards for a touchdown and a halftime score of 42–7.

With the game in hand midway through the second quarter, Alabama played many of its reserve players in the second half. The Tide scored in the third quarter first on a seven-yard A. J. McCarron touchdown pass to Chris Underwood and again on a one-yard Demetrius Goode touchdown run after a Chris Jordan interception to take a 56–7 lead into the final period. In the fourth, Jalston Fowler scored on a 36-yard touchdown run to make the final score 63–7.

After he completed 12 of 13 passes, McElroy set a new single-game Alabama record for completion percentage of 92.3 percent to break the previous record he set against North Texas in 2009. The game also marked the first time Alabama played on a Thursday night since defeating Southern Miss in 2001, and the return of both former Alabama head coach Bill Curry as the Panthers' head coach and quarterback Star Jackson who transferred to Georgia State prior to the 2010 season. The 63 points were the most scored by an Alabama team since defeating Vanderbilt 63–3 in 1979.

=== Auburn ===
Iron Bowl

Team	1	2	3	4	Total
• #2 Auburn	0	7	14	7	28
#9 Alabama	21	3	3	0	27

- Location: Tuscaloosa, Alabama
- Game start: 1:41 p.m.
- Elapsed time: 3:29
- Game attendance: 101,821
- Game weather: 49°, Mostly Cloudy
- Referee: Tom Ritter
- TV announcers (CBS): Verne Lundquist (play-by-play), Gary Danielson (color), Tracy Wolfson (sideline)

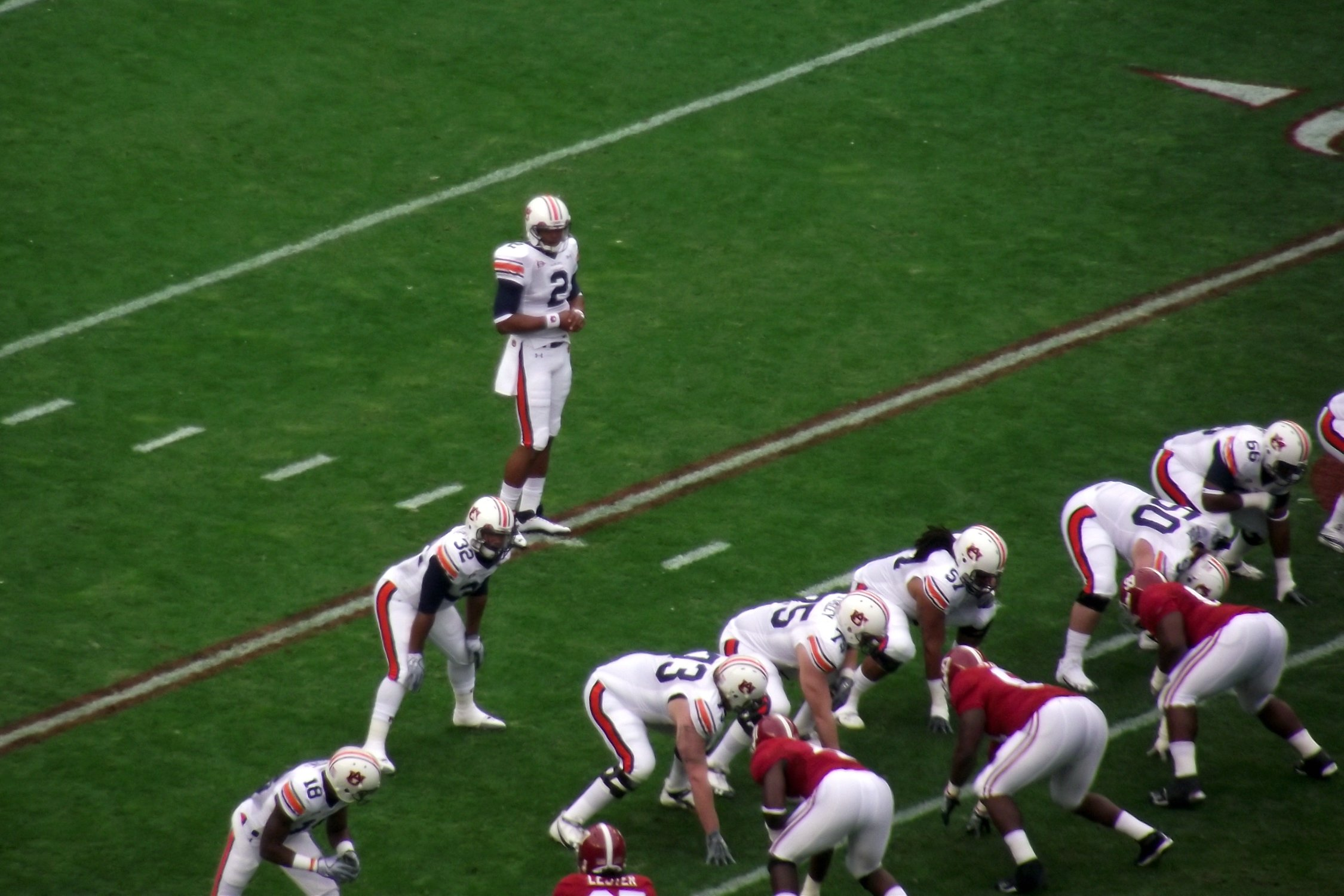
Led by Cam Newton (top), Auburn rallied from a 24-point deficit to win.

In the 75th edition of the Iron Bowl, the Auburn Tigers overcame a 24-point deficit to defeat the Crimson Tide 28–27. Alabama opened a 21–0 lead after the first quarter with touchdown scores on their first three offensive possessions. Touchdowns were scored on a nine-yard Mark Ingram run, a 68-yard Julio Jones reception from Greg McElroy and on a 12-yard Darius Hanks reception from McElroy. The lead was pushed to 24–0 in the second quarter after a 20-yard Jeremy Shelley field goal before the Tigers began their comeback.

Auburn scored their first points late in the second on a 36-yard Cam Newton pass to Emory Blake to bring the score to 24–7 at the half. With the only Alabama points in the third scored on a 32-yard Shelley field goal, Auburn brought the margin to 27–21 entering the fourth on a 70-yard Cam Newton touchdown pass to Terrell Zachery and a one-yard Newton run. The Tigers took a 28–27 lead in the fourth on a seven-yard Philip Lutzenkirchen reception from Newton that held to the end of regulation.

With his 10 catch, 199 yard performance, Julio Jones set Alabama single-season records for both receptions and receiving yards in eclipsing the previous marks of 67 receptions by D. J. Hall in 2007 and 1,056 yards by Hall in 2006. The loss ended a 20-game home winning streak for the Tide dating back to the 2007 loss to Louisiana–Monroe, and brought Alabama's all-time record against the Tigers to 40–34–1. The CBS telecast of this game earned a 7.5 rating, the highest for any game of the 2010 college football season through week 13.

=== Michigan State—Capital One Bowl ===
Capital One Bowl

Team	1	2	3	4	Total
• #15 Alabama	7	21	14	7	49
#7 Michigan State	0	0	0	7	7

- Location: Orlando, Florida
- Game start: 12:03 p.m.
- Elapsed time: 3:12
- Game attendance: 61,519
- Game weather: 77, Sunny
- Referee: Greg Burks
- TV announcers (ESPN): Brad Nessler (play-by-play), Todd Blackledge (color), Holly Rowe (sideline)

On December 5, Capital One Bowl officials announced Alabama would face the Big Ten co-champion Michigan State Spartans in the 2011 Capital One Bowl. In a strong defensive performance where the Spartans were held to a total of minus-48 yards rushing, Alabama was victorious 49–7. Alabama scored touchdowns on their first four offensive possessions. Mark Ingram scored first on a one-yard touchdown run to complete a 13-play, 79-yard drive on Alabama's first possession. After a Robert Lester interception of a Kirk Cousins pass on the Spartans' opening drive, the Tide scored on an eight-yard Trent Richardson touchdown run. Alabama extended their lead to 28–0 at the half following touchdown runs of six and 35-yards by Ingram and Julio Jones.

After holding Michigan State to a three-and-out to open the third quarter, Alabama scored its fifth touchdown in six offensive possessions when Marquis Maze scored on a 37-yard Greg McElroy pass. Up by 35 points late in the third, the Crimson Tide pulled many of their starters that resulted in many players seeing action from deep in the depth chart. Eddie Lacy extended the lead to 49–0 with touchdown runs of twelve-yards in the third and 62-yards in the fourth quarter. Michigan State scored their only points late in the fourth on a 49-yard Bennie Fowler touchdown reception from Keith Nichol to make the final score 49–7. The 42-point margin of victory was Alabama's largest in a bowl game since defeating Syracuse 61–6 in the 1953 Orange Bowl.

The minus-48 yards rushing allowed by the Alabama defense was the fewest ever allowed in a bowl game and the second fewest allowed all-time only eclipsed by a minus-49 yard performance against Houston in 1962. With his pair of touchdowns, Mark Ingram established a new Alabama record for career rushing touchdowns with 42 to eclipse the previous mark of 41 set by Shaun Alexander. The contest also marked both Nick Saban's and Bobby Williams' first game against the Spartans since their respective terms as Michigan State's head coach between 1995–1999 and 2000–2002.

== Personnel ==
=== Coaching staff ===
The only change to the coaching staff from the 2009 season was the departure of James Willis, an associate head and outside linebackers coach, to become the defensive coordinator at Texas Tech. Willis was replaced on the staff with Jeremy Pruitt on January 15. Other assistants that declined positions at other programs included Jim McElwain declining an offer to become San Jose State's head coach and Kirby Smart declining an offer to become Georgia's defensive coordinator.

Name	Position	Seasons at Alabama	Alma mater (year)
Nick Saban	Head coach	4	Kent State (1973)
Burton Burns	Associate head coach, Running Backs	4	Nebraska (1976)
Curt Cignetti	Receivers, Recruiting Coordinator	4	West Virginia (1983)
Bo Davis	Defensive Line	4	LSU (1993)
Jim McElwain	Offensive coordinator, Quarterbacks	3	Eastern Washington (1984)
Joe Pendry	Assistant head coach, Offensive Line	4	West Virginia (1969)
Jeremy Pruitt	Secondary	1	West Alabama (1999)
Kirby Smart	Defensive coordinator, Linebackers	4	Georgia (1999)
Sal Sunseri	Assistant head coach, Linebackers	2	Pittsburgh (1982)
Bobby Williams	Tight Ends, Special Teams	3	Purdue (1982)
Scott Cochran	Strength and Conditioning	4	LSU (2001)

Offensive analysts

- Jeff Norrid

Defensive analysts

- Dan O'Brien

Special teams analysts

- Joe Judge

Graduate assistants

- Derrick Ansley
- Jody Wright
- Kevin Garver

Strength and conditioning assistants

- Freddie Roach

=== Depth chart ===
Starters and backups.

Defense

FS
Robert Lester
Will Lowery
Jarrick Williams

WLB	ILB	ILB	SLB
Courtney Upshaw	Nico Johnson	Dont'a Hightower	⋅
Ed Stinson	C. J. Mosley	Chris Jordan	⋅
Adrian Hubbard	Jerrell Harris	Nico Johnson	⋅

SS
Mark Barron
Nick Perry
Will Lowery

CB
Dee Milliner
DeQuan Menzie
B. J. Scott

DE	NT	DE
Luther Davis	Josh Chapman	Marcell Dareus
Damion Square	Nick Gentry	Undra Billingsley
Brandon Moore	Kerry Murphy	Darrington Sentimore

CB
Dre Kirkpatrick
Phelon Jones
John Fulton

Offense

WR
Julio Jones
Earl Alexander
Brandon Gibson

LT	LG	C	RG	RT
James Carpenter	Chance Warmack	William Vlachos	Barrett Jones	D. J. Fluker
Alfred McCullough	John Michael Boswell	David Ross	Anthony Steen	Arie Kouandjio
Tyler Love	Brian Motley	Brian Motley	⋅	John Michael Boswell

TE
Michael Williams
Chris Underwood
⋅

WR
Marquis Maze
Darius Hanks
Kenny Bell

QB
Greg McElroy
A. J. McCarron
Phillip Sims

RB
Mark Ingram II
Trent Richardson
Eddie Lacy

FB
Preston Dial
Brad Smelley
⋅

Special teams
PK Cade Foster
PK Jeremy Shelley
P Cody Mandell
KR Trent Richardson/Julio Jones
PR Marquis Maze
LS Carson Tinker
H AJ McCarron

=== Recruiting class ===
Alabama's recruiting class was highlighted by eight players from the "ESPN 150": No. 16 DeMarcus Milliner (CB); No. 32 Phillip Sims (QB); No. 36 John Fulton (CB); No. 54 Adrian Hubbard (DE); No. 74 Chad Lindsay (OG); No. 89 Keiwone Malone (WR); No. 99 C.J. Mosley (OLB); and No. 132 Brian Vogler (TE). Alabama signed the No. 5 recruiting class according to Rivals and the No. 4 recruiting class according to Scout. The football program received 18 letters of intent on National Signing Day, February 3, 2010.

College recruiting
Name	Hometown	School	Height	Weight	40^{‡}	Commit date
Deion Belue; DB	Tuscumbia, Alabama	Deshler High School	6 ft 0 in (1.83 m)	165 lb (75 kg)	4.3	Jun 20, 2009
Deion Belue; DB	Recruit ratings: Scout: Rivals: 247Sports: ESPN:					
Ronald Carswell; WR	Macon, Georgia	Westside High School	6 ft 0 in (1.83 m)	171 lb (78 kg)	4.44	Apr 7, 2009
Ronald Carswell; WR	Recruit ratings: Scout: Rivals: 247Sports: ESPN:					
Cade Foster; K	Southlake, Texas	Carroll High School	6 ft 1 in (1.85 m)	215 lb (98 kg)		Nov 29, 2008
Cade Foster; K	Recruit ratings: Scout: Rivals: 247Sports: ESPN:					
Jalston Fowler; FB	Prichard, Alabama	Vigor High School	6 ft 0 in (1.83 m)	245 lb (111 kg)	4.65	Feb 14, 2009
Jalston Fowler; FB	Recruit ratings: Scout: Rivals: 247Sports: ESPN:					
Corey Grant; RB	Opelika, Alabama	Opelika High School	5 ft 9 in (1.75 m)	190 lb (86 kg)	4.4	Jul 23, 2009
Corey Grant; RB	Recruit ratings: Scout: Rivals: 247Sports: ESPN:					
Alfy Hill; DE	Shallotte, North Carolina	West Brunswick High School	6 ft 4 in (1.93 m)	245 lb (111 kg)	4.6	Sep 9, 2009
Alfy Hill; DE	Recruit ratings: Scout: Rivals: 247Sports: ESPN:					
Adrian Hubbard; DE	Norcross, Georgia	Norcross High School	6 ft 7 in (2.01 m)	227 lb (103 kg)		Dec 8, 2009
Adrian Hubbard; DE	Recruit ratings: Scout: Rivals: 247Sports: ESPN:					
Brandon Ivory; DT	Memphis, Tennessee	Memphis East High School	6 ft 3 in (1.91 m)	330 lb (150 kg)		Jan 28, 2010
Brandon Ivory; DT	Recruit ratings: Scout: Rivals: 247Sports: ESPN:					
Harrison Jones; TE	Cordova, Tennessee	Evangelical Christian School	6 ft 4 in (1.93 m)	225 lb (102 kg)		Aug 25, 2009
Harrison Jones; TE	Recruit ratings: Scout: Rivals: 247Sports: ESPN:					
Arie Kouandjio; OL	Hyattsville, Maryland	DeMatha Catholic High School	6 ft 6 in (1.98 m)	314 lb (142 kg)		Feb 2, 2010
Arie Kouandjio; OL	Recruit ratings: Scout: Rivals: 247Sports: ESPN:					
Brandon Lewis; DT	Scooba, Mississippi	East Mississippi Community College	6 ft 3 in (1.91 m)	280 lb (130 kg)		Feb 5, 2009
Brandon Lewis; DT	Recruit ratings: Scout: Rivals: 247Sports: ESPN:					
Chad Lindsay; OG	The Woodlands, Texas	The Woodlands High School	6 ft 3 in (1.91 m)	310 lb (140 kg)	5.4	Apr 6, 2009
Chad Lindsay; OG	Recruit ratings: Scout: Rivals: 247Sports: ESPN:					
Wilson Love; DT	Mountain Brook, Alabama	Mountain Brook High School	6 ft 4 in (1.93 m)	270 lb (120 kg)	4.7	Apr 18, 2009
Wilson Love; DT	Recruit ratings: Scout: Rivals: 247Sports: ESPN:					
Keiwone Malone; WR	Memphis, Tennessee	Mitchell High School	5 ft 11 in (1.80 m)	165 lb (75 kg)	4.4	Feb 6, 2009
Keiwone Malone; WR	Recruit ratings: Scout: Rivals: 247Sports: ESPN:					
DeQuan Menzie; DB	Wesson, Mississippi	Copiah-Lincoln Community College	5 ft 11 in (1.80 m)	200 lb (91 kg)		Jan 31, 2010
DeQuan Menzie; DB	Recruit ratings: Scout: Rivals: 247Sports: ESPN:					
Dee Milliner; DB	Millbrook, Alabama	Stanhope Elmore High School	6 ft 1 in (1.85 m)	185 lb (84 kg)	4.35	Jun 4, 2009
Dee Milliner; DB	Recruit ratings: Scout: Rivals: 247Sports: ESPN:					
C. J. Mosley; LB	Theodore, Alabama	Theodore High School	6 ft 2 in (1.88 m)	212 lb (96 kg)	4.5	Jan 9, 2010
C. J. Mosley; LB	Recruit ratings: Scout: Rivals: 247Sports: ESPN:					
Nick Perry; DB	Prattville, Alabama	Prattville High School	6 ft 2 in (1.88 m)	190 lb (86 kg)		Apr 1, 2009
Nick Perry; DB	Recruit ratings: Scout: Rivals: 247Sports: ESPN:					
Austin Shepherd; OG	Suwanee, Georgia	North Gwinnett High School	6 ft 4 in (1.93 m)	310 lb (140 kg)	5.44	Mar 9, 2009
Austin Shepherd; OG	Recruit ratings: Scout: Rivals: 247Sports: ESPN:					
Blake Sims; DB	Gainesville, Georgia	Gainesville High School	6 ft 0 in (1.83 m)	191 lb (87 kg)	4.56	Apr 4, 2009
Blake Sims; DB	Recruit ratings: Scout: Rivals: 247Sports: ESPN:					
Phillip Sims; QB	Chesapeake, Virginia	Oscar F. Smith High School	6 ft 2 in (1.88 m)	215 lb (98 kg)	4.7	Apr 15, 2009
Phillip Sims; QB	Recruit ratings: Scout: Rivals: 247Sports: ESPN:					
Brian Vogler; TE	Columbus, Georgia	Brookstone School	6 ft 7 in (2.01 m)	246 lb (112 kg)	4.65	Jul 22, 2009
Brian Vogler; TE	Recruit ratings: Scout: Rivals: 247Sports: ESPN:					
DeAndrew White; WR	Galena Park, Texas	North Shore High School	6 ft 0 in (1.83 m)	170 lb (77 kg)	4.4	Oct 12, 2009
DeAndrew White; WR	Recruit ratings: Scout: Rivals: 247Sports: ESPN:					
Jarrick Williams; DB	Prichard, Alabama	Mattie T. Blount High School	6 ft 2 in (1.88 m)	205 lb (93 kg)	4.5	Jun 26, 2009
Jarrick Williams; DB	Recruit ratings: Scout: Rivals: 247Sports: ESPN:					
Jay Williams; P	Thomasville, Alabama	Thomasville High School	6 ft 4 in (1.93 m)	220 lb (100 kg)		Jun 20, 2009
Jay Williams; P	Recruit ratings: Scout: Rivals: 247Sports: ESPN:					
Overall recruit ranking: Scout: 3 Rivals: 2 ESPN: 3
‡ Refers to 40-yard dash; Note: In many cases, Scout, Rivals, 247Sports, On3, and ESPN may conflict in their listings of height, weight and 40 time.; In these cases, the average was taken. ESPN grades are on a 100-point scale.; Sources: "Scout.com Football Recruiting: Alabama". Scout.; "2010 Player Signees- Alabama". ESPN.; "Scout.com Team Recruiting Rankings". Scout.; "2010 Team Ranking". Rivals.com.

== Statistics ==
On the defensive side of the ball, they ranked third in scoring defense (13.54 points per game), fifth in total defense (286.38 yards per game), tenth in rushing defense (110.15 yards per game) and thirteenth in passing defense (176.23 yards per game). They were also the conference leaders in both scoring and total defense. On offense, nationally the Crimson Tide ranked 18th in scoring offense (35.69 points per game), 22nd in total offense (444.08 yards per game), 27th in passing offense (261.15 yards per game) and 29th in rushing offense (182.92 yards per game). Individually, Robert Lester led the SEC with an average of 0.62 interceptions per game.

== Awards and honors ==
In the weeks following the SEC Championship Game, multiple Alabama players were recognized for their on-field performances with a variety of awards and recognitions. At the team awards banquet on December 6, Mark Barron, Dont'a Hightower, and Greg McElroy were each named the permanent captains of the 2010 squad. At that time Julio Jones was named the 2010 most valuable players with Dont'a Hightower and Mark Barron named defensive players of the year and Greg McElroy and Mark Ingram named the offensive players of the year.

The SEC recognized several players for their individual performances with various awards. Defensive back Mark Barron, wide receiver Julio Jones and offensive guard Barrett Jones were all named to the AP All-SEC First Team. Offensive lineman James Carpenter, defensive lineman Marcell Dareus, running back Mark Ingram, linebacker Dont'a Hightower and defensive back Robert Lester were all named to the AP All-SEC Second Team. Quarterback Greg McElroy and center William Vlachos were each named AP All-SEC Honorable Mention. Four players were named to the Coaches' All-SEC First Team including Barron, James Carpenter, Marcell Dareus and Julio Jones. Barrett Jones, William Vlachos, Mark Ingram, Dont'a Hightower, return specialist Trent Richardson and defensive backs Robert Lester and Dre Kirkpatrick were named to the Coaches' All-SEC Second Team. Four players were named to the Freshman All-SEC Coaches' Team including offensive lineman D.J. Fluker, linebacker C.J. Mosley, defensive back Dee Milliner and punter Cody Mandell.

In addition to the conference awards, several players were also named to various national All-American Teams. Julio Jones and Mark Barron were named to the AP All-American Second Team and Marcell Dareus and Barrett Jones were named to the AP All-American Third Team. Barron was also named to the All-America team by the Football Writers Association of America (FWAA). Quarterback Greg McElroy, tight end Preston Dial and offensive lineman James Carpenter were all selected to play in the Under Armour Senior Bowl.

== After the season ==
As part of the A-Day celebrations on April 16, the 2010 team captains Greg McElroy, Dont'a Hightower and Mark Barron were honored at the Walk of Fame ceremony at the base of Denny Chimes. Later that day, as recognition for becoming the fifth Alabama head coach to win a national championship with the 2009 squad, the university unveiled a statue of coach Saban along the Walk of Champions outside Bryant–Denny Stadium.

=== Coaching changes ===
In the week following the Capitol One Bowl victory, several changes were made to the Alabama coaching staff. Defensive line coach Bo Davis resigned his position to serve as the defensive tackles coach for Texas. The following day, Chris Rumph was hired by Coach Saban from Clemson to replace Davis as defensive line coach. On January 12, assistant head coach and offensive line coach Joe Pendry announced his retirement. The following day, former Miami interim head coach Jeff Stoutland was hired to replace Pendry as offensive line coach. On January 21, wide receivers coach and recruiting coordinator Curt Cignetti resigned his position to accept the head coaching job at Indiana University of Pennsylvania. On February 7, Mike Groh was hired a Cignetti's replacement as wide receivers coach and recruiting coordinator.

=== NFL draft ===
Of all the draft-eligible juniors, Mark Ingram, Julio Jones and Marcell Dareus declared their eligibility for the 2011 NFL draft on January 7. At the time of their announcement, each was projected as a first round pick. Five Alabama players, two seniors and three juniors, were invited to the NFL Scouting Combine. The invited players were offensive lineman James Carpenter, quarterback Greg McElroy, defensive end Marcell Dareus, running back Mark Ingram, and wide receiver Julio Jones. In the draft, Alabama set a school record with four players selected in the first round. The first round selections were Dareus (3rd Buffalo Bills), Jones (6th Atlanta Falcons), Carpenter (25th Seattle Seahawks) and Ingram (28th New Orleans Saints). McElroy was selected in the seventh round (208th New York Jets). Preston Dial signed as an undrafted free agent with the Detroit Lions in July 2011 after the NFL labor dispute was resolved.
