= Josh Chapman =

American football player (born 1989)

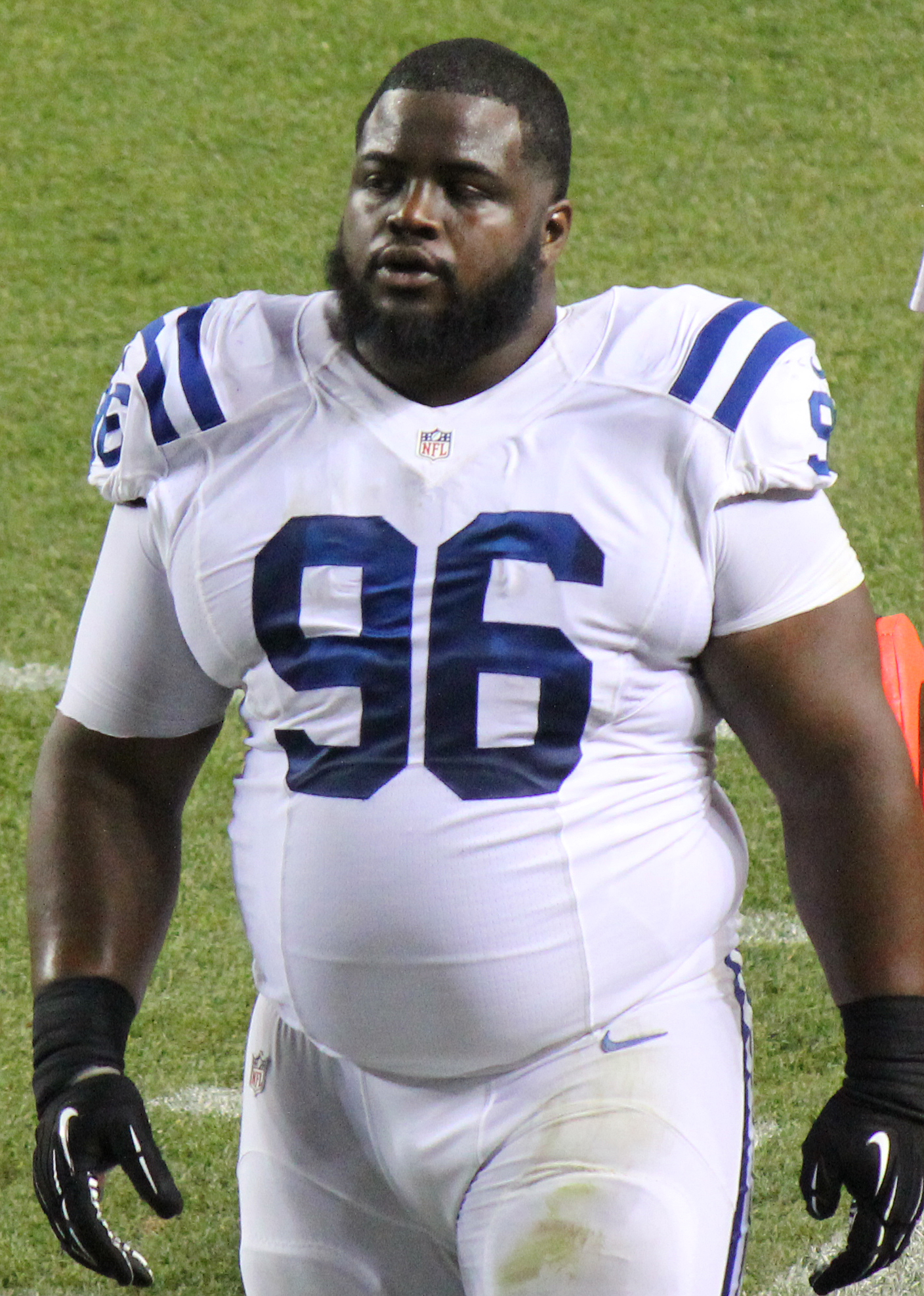
- Chapman with the Indianapolis Colts in 2014

No. 96
- Position: Nose tackle

Personal information
- Born: June 10, 1989 (age 37); Hoover, Alabama, U.S.
- Listed height: 6 ft 0 in (1.83 m)
- Listed weight: 340 lb (154 kg)

Career information
- High school: Hoover
- College: Alabama
- NFL draft: 2012: 5th round, 136th overall pick

Career history
- Indianapolis Colts (2012–2015)

Awards and highlights
- BCS national champion (2010, 2012); Second-team All-SEC (2011)

Career NFL statistics
- Games played: 29
- Games started: 15
- Total tackles: 36
- Forced fumbles: 1
- Stats at Pro Football Reference

Joshua Antron Chapman (born June 10, 1989) is an American former professional football player who was a nose tackle in the National Football League (NFL). He played college football for the Alabama Crimson Tide and was selected by the Indianapolis Colts in the fifth round of the 2012 NFL draft. Chapman served as the backup to All-American Terrence Cody during the 2008 and 2009 seasons, and was regarded as one of the better nose guard prospects in his class.

Chapman appeared on the cover of the October 10, 2011, issue of Sports Illustrated after Alabama's 38–10 victory over Florida.

== Early life ==
A native of Birmingham, Alabama, Chapman attended Hoover High School and played high school football under head coach Rush Propst and defensive coordinator Jeremy Pruitt. Probst described him as the best defensive lineman in school history. As a junior, Chapman tallied 65 tackles, six sacks, and three tackles, while helping the Hoover Buccaneers to a 14–1 season record. In his senior season, Chapman recorded 97 tackles, 22 tackles for losses, two sacks, and an interception. Hoover finished the season as the 6A state runner-up with a 13–2 record, losing the state final 35–21 to Prattville. The only other loss came against Joe McKnight's John Curtis Christian (LA).

Regarded as a three-star prospect, Chapman was ranked as the No. 32 defensive tackle in his class, which was highlighted by Marvin Austin and Torrey Davis. He chose Alabama over offers from Auburn, Mississippi, and Mississippi State.

== College career ==
Chapman attended and played college football at the University of Alabama from 2007 to 2011 under head coach Nick Saban. He played in three games in the 2007 season before earning a medical redshirt. He was part of the 2009 Alabama team that won the National Championship over the Texas Longhorns and the 2011 Alabama team that won the National Championship over the LSU Tigers.

=== College statistics ===
						Tackles					Def Int					Fumbles			
Year	School	Conf	Class	Pos	G	Solo	Ast	Tot	Loss	Sk	Int	Yds	Avg	TD	PD	FR	Yds	TD	FF
2008	Alabama	SEC	SO	DL	10	9	7	16	4.0	0.0					0	0	0	0	0
2009	Alabama	SEC	JR	DL	13	6	11	17	2.5	0.5					0	0	0	0	0
2010	Alabama	SEC	SR	DL	13	18	13	31	3.5	1.0	0	0		0	2	0			0
2011	Alabama	SEC	SR	DL	12	10	13	23	3.5	1.0	0	0		0	2	0			0
Career					44	44	88	13.5	2.5	0	0	0	0	4	0	0	0	0	0

== Professional career ==
Pre-draft measurables
Height	Weight	Arm length	Hand span	40-yard dash	Bench press
6 ft 0 5/8 in (1.84 m)	316 lb (143 kg)	32 in (0.81 m)	11 7/8 in (0.30 m)	4.93 s	40 reps
All values from NFL Combine

Chapman was selected in the fifth round (136th overall) by the Indianapolis Colts in the 2012 NFL draft. He was the sixth of eight Crimson Tide players to be selected that year.

The Colts signed Chapman to a four-year, $2.3 million deal. He missed his rookie season due to injury. He played 13 games in the 2013 season and made 20 tackles and defended one pass. In the 2014 season, he appeared in all 16 games and started 15. On the season, he had 25 total tackles and one forced fumble. On September 5, 2015, Chapman was waived by the Colts.

== Post-playing career ==
After his time with the Colts, Chapman joined the Alabama coaching staff as an assistant strength coach.
