= Nico Johnson =

American football player (born 1990)

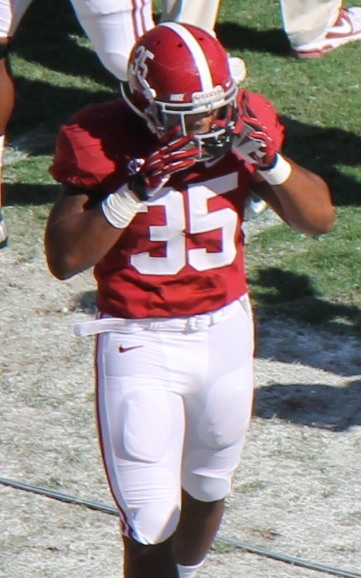
- Johnson with the Alabama Crimson Tide in 2012

No. 57, 52, 48
- Position: Linebacker

Personal information
- Born: June 19, 1990 (age 36); Andalusia, Alabama, U.S.
- Listed height: 6 ft 2 in (1.88 m)
- Listed weight: 248 lb (112 kg)

Career information
- High school: Andalusia
- College: Alabama (2009–2012)
- NFL draft: 2013: 4th round, 99th overall pick

Career history
- Kansas City Chiefs (2013–2014); Cincinnati Bengals (2014); Washington Redskins (2015)*; New York Giants (2015)
- * Offseason or practice squad member only

Awards and highlights
- 3× BCS national champion (2009, 2011, 2012); All-SEC Freshman Team (2009)

Career NFL statistics
- Total tackles: 22
- Fumble recoveries: 1
- Stats at Pro Football Reference

Nico Johnson (born June 19, 1990) is an American former professional football player who was a linebacker in the National Football League (NFL). He was selected by the Kansas City Chiefs in the fourth round of the 2013 NFL draft. He played college football for the Alabama Crimson Tide, where he was a member of national championship teams in 2009, 2011, and 2012.

== Early life ==
Johnson was born in Andalusia, Alabama. He attended Andalusia High School, where he played basketball under coach Richard Robertson, as well as football. He recorded 78 tackles, 32 assists, one fumble recovery, one blocked punt and 11 interceptions during his senior season. As a junior, he made 80 tackles and blocked one field goal attempt.

Johnson received ASWA first-team All-State honors three consecutive times and was named to the Orlando Sentinel′s All-Southern Team and the Press Register′s Super Southeast 120 (No. 12). He also earned All-American honors by Parade, was a finalist for the High School Butkus Award, and was selected U.S. Army All-American Bowl, where he led the West squad with four solo tackles, including two tackles for loss.

Considered a five-star recruit by Rivals.com, Johnson was ranked as the No. 2 outside linebacker prospect, behind only Jelani Jenkins. He has made numerous visits to Alabama and said one of the reasons he chose the Crimson Tide over finalists Oregon, Florida, Louisiana State, and Southern California was to be near his mother, who suffered from diabetes. Johnson is now a contributor to the class of 2009 scholarship at Andalusia High School.

== College career ==
Johnson enrolled in the University of Alabama, where he played for coach Nick Saban's Alabama Crimson Tide football team from 2009 to 2012. As a true freshman in 2009, Johnson began the season as a backup, but soon had to step in for the injured Dont'a Hightower. He played in 12 games and made two starts at weak-side inside linebacker next to Rolando McClain. He earned freshman All-SEC selection by the league coaches and Sporting News after the 2009 season. Nico Johnson was part of three BCS National Championship teams (2009, 2011, 2012) while playing for the Crimson Tide.

=== College statistics ===
Year	GP–GS	Tackles				Sacks	Pass defense				Fumbles		Blocked
Year	GP–GS	Solo	Ast	Total	Loss–Yards	No–Yards	Int–Yards	BU	PD	QBH	Rcv–Yards	FF	Kick
2009	12–3	17	11	28	4.5–18	1.0–15	0–0	2	2	0	0–0	1	0
2010	13–6	22	11	33	3.5–7	0.0–0	1–0	1	2	1	0–0	0	0
2011	13–6	25	22	47	6.5–18	1.0–5	1–2	3	4	0	1–0	1	0
2012	13–5	23	31	54	2.0–6	0.0–0	0.0–0	1	1	1	0–0	2	0

== Professional career ==
=== Kansas City Chiefs ===
In the 2013 NFL draft, Johnson was selected by the Kansas City Chiefs in the fourth round with the 99th overall draft pick. Johnson signed a 4-year, $2 million deal with the Chiefs. On August 30, 2014, he was released during final preseason roster cut downs. The next day, he was signed to the Chiefs practice squad.

=== Cincinnati Bengals ===
Johnson was signed by the Cincinnati Bengals on October 17, 2014, off the Chiefs' practice squad. On August 31, 2015, he was released by the Bengals.

=== Washington Redskins ===
The Washington Redskins signed Johnson to their practice squad on September 25, 2015. On October 20, 2015, he was released by the Redskins.

=== New York Giants ===
On November 10, 2015, the New York Giants signed Johnson to their practice squad. On December 31, 2015, Johnson was promoted to the 53-man roster.

On April 12, 2016, the New York Giants waived Johnson with a failed physical designation.
