= Mark Barron =

American football player (born 1989)

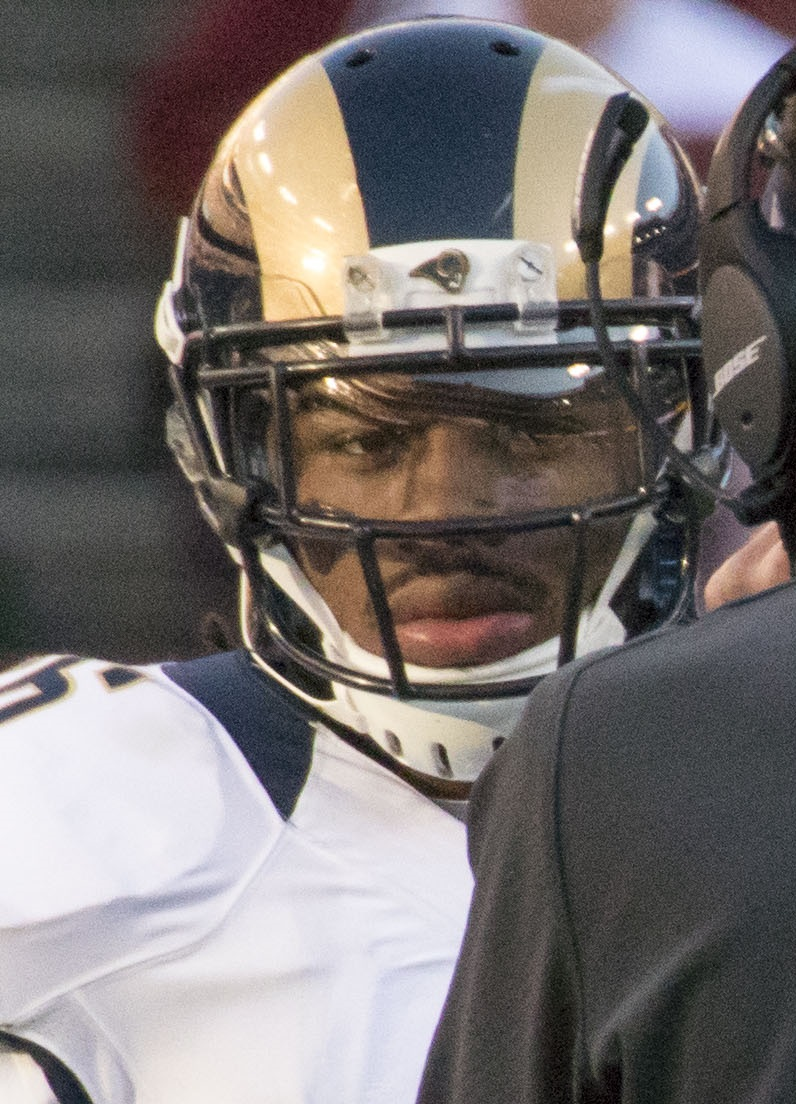
- Barron with the St. Louis Rams in 2014

No. 24, 23, 26
- Position: Safety

Personal information
- Born: October 27, 1989 (age 37); Mobile, Alabama, U.S.
- Listed height: 6 ft 2 in (1.88 m)
- Listed weight: 230 lb (104 kg)

Career information
- High school: St. Paul's Episcopal School (Mobile)
- College: Alabama (2008–2011)
- NFL draft: 2012: 1st round, 7th overall pick

Career history
- Tampa Bay Buccaneers (2012–2014); St. Louis / Los Angeles Rams (2014–2018); Pittsburgh Steelers (2019); Denver Broncos (2020)

Awards and highlights
- PFWA All-Rookie Team (2012); 2× BCS national champion (2009, 2011); Unanimous All-American (2011); First-team All-American (2010); Third-team All-American (2009); 3× First-team All-SEC (2009–2011)

Career NFL statistics
- Total tackles: 710
- Sacks: 12
- Forced fumbles: 5
- Fumble recoveries: 4
- Interceptions: 9
- Pass deflections: 42
- Stats at Pro Football Reference

Mark Barron (born October 27, 1989) is an American former professional football player who was a safety in the National Football League (NFL). He played college football for the Alabama Crimson Tide, where he was twice recognized as an All-American, and was a member of two BCS National Championship teams. He was selected as a strong safety by the Tampa Bay Buccaneers in the first round of the 2012 NFL draft, where he played for two and a half seasons before being traded to the St. Louis Rams in 2014, where he moved to the linebacker position. He also played for the Pittsburgh Steelers and Denver Broncos.

== Early life ==
Barron was born in Mobile, Alabama. He attended St. Paul's Episcopal School in Mobile, where he played for the St. Paul's Saints high school football team, under the coaching of Eddie Guth. He played multiple positions, including running back, wide receiver, and linebacker from 2004 through 2007. Barron had 785 rushing yards as a junior on 78 carries and added 368 receiving yards on 23 catches, scoring a total of 12 touchdowns. As a senior, Barron was the MVP of the 2007 Class 5A state championship game after rushing for 1,094 yards on 122 carries with 15 touchdowns in his senior season. He was also named a first-team Alabama Sports Writers Association All-State selection in Class 5A as a senior.

In addition to playing football, Barron also competed in track & field, where he won multiple 5A individual state titles in events ranging from the shot put to the long jump during the 2008 season. He recorded a career-best throw of 17.09 meters in the shot put at the Mobile Challenge of Champions, where he placed first. He captured four state titles at the 2008 AHSAA 4A-6A Championships, winning the triple jump, with a jump of 14.08 meters, long jump, with a leap of 6.74 meters, discus throw, with a throw of 44.03 meters, and in shot put, with a throw of 16.76 meters. He also recorded a personal-best time of 11.39 seconds in the 100 meters.

Barron was ranked as a five-star prospect and the number one weakside linebacker in the Class of 2008 by Scout.com. He was also ranked as the fifth best player in the state of Alabama and the 55th best player in the nation in the Class of 2008 by Rivals.com. Barron chose to play at Alabama over offers from Auburn, LSU, Florida, Florida State, and Tennessee among others.

College recruiting
Name	Hometown	School	Height	Weight	40^{‡}	Commit date
Mark Barron; S	Mobile, Alabama	St. Paul's Episcopal	6 ft 2 in (1.88 m)	210 lb (95 kg)	4.50	Aug 24, 2007
Mark Barron; S	Recruit ratings: Scout: Rivals: (80)					
Overall recruit ranking: Scout: 12 (WLB) Rivals: 55 (WLB) ESPN: NR
‡ Refers to 40-yard dash; Note: In many cases, Scout, Rivals, 247Sports, On3, and ESPN may conflict in their listings of height, weight and 40 time.; In these cases, the average was taken. ESPN grades are on a 100-point scale.; Sources: "Alabama Signee List 2008". Rivals.; "Scout.com Football Recruiting: Alabama". Scout.; "2008 Player Signees- Alabama". ESPN.; "Scout.com Team Recruiting Rankings". Scout.; "2008 Team Ranking". Rivals.com.

== College career ==
Barron accepted an athletic scholarship to attend the University of Alabama, where he played for coach Nick Saban's Alabama Crimson Tide football team from 2008 to 2011.

As a true freshman for the 2008 Crimson Tide, he made his first appearance on kick-off coverage against Clemson. He had his first career tackle early in the game on a crushing blow of Jacoby Ford on a kickoff return. On September 20, against Arkansas, he recorded his first collegiate sack. Barron played in all of Alabama's 14 games, recording 18 tackles and a sack.

During his sophomore season in 2009, Barron took over as a starter at safety and was second on Alabama's national championship team with 74 tackles and a Southeastern Conference-leading seven interceptions and a touchdown. On October 10, against Ole Miss, he had his first career collegiate reception, which went for seven yards. On October 17, against South Carolina, he had a 77-yard pick six in the 20–6 victory. On November 14, against Mississippi State, he had two interceptions in the 31–3 victory. Barron finished the regular season tied for third in the nation with seven interceptions and tied for sixth in the nation with 17 passes defended. In the SEC Championship against Florida, he had seven total tackles in the 32–13 victory. In the BCS National Championship against Texas, he had six total tackles and one pass defended in the 37–21 victory. He was recognized as a first-team All-SEC selection and third-team All-American at safety.

Barron was the Crimson Tide's only returning starter in the defensive secondary for the 2010 season. He finished the season with 77 tackles, three interceptions, nine passes defended, and one forced fumble. He was named an FWAA All-American.

In 2011, Barron was again a first-team All-SEC selection and was recognized as a unanimous first-team All-American. In the BCS National Championship against LSU, he had two total tackles and a sack in the 21–0 victory.

== Professional career ==
=== Pre-draft ===
Barron attended the NFL Combine in Indianapolis, but did not perform drills as he was still recovering after recently undergoing sports hernia surgery. On March 7, 2012, Barron attended Alabama's pro day and performed the majority of drills, but opted to skip the short shuttle, three-cone drill, and bench press. At the conclusion of the pre-draft process, Barron was projected to be a first round pick by NFL draft experts and scouts. He was ranked as the best strong safety prospect by DraftScout.com and was ranked as the top safety by NFL analysts Mike Mayock, Charley Casserly, and The Sporting News.

External videos
- NFL Draft Profile: Mark Barron

Pre-draft measurables
Height	Weight	Arm length	Hand span	Wingspan	40-yard dash	10-yard split	20-yard split	Vertical jump	Broad jump
6 ft 1 in (1.85 m)	213 lb (97 kg)	33 5/8 in (0.85 m)	9 1/2 in (0.24 m)	6 ft 7 5/8 in (2.02 m)	4.54 s	1.63 s	2.65 s	34.5 in (0.88 m)	10 ft 2 in (3.10 m)
All values from NFL Combine/Alabama's Pro Day

=== Tampa Bay Buccaneers ===
Barron was selected in the first round with the seventh overall pick by the Tampa Bay Buccaneers in the 2012 NFL draft. He is the highest selected Alabama defensive back in school history, surpassing Antonio Langham, who was chosen ninth overall in 1994 by the Cleveland Browns.

External videos
- Buccaneers draft Mark Barron 7th overall
- First Draft: Mark Barron

"Boy, is this a solid pick. I love this kid because his floor and ceiling are the same thing. His ceiling is to be a Pro Bowl safety; his floor is to be a Pro Bowl safety. That's how good this young man is. This is going to be a good football team next year."
-Mike Mayock, former NFL safety and current NFL Network analyst

==== 2012 ====
On July 20, 2012, the Tampa Bay Buccaneers signed Barron to a four-year, $14.56 million contract with a $9.00 million signing bonus and no offset language. Barron was expected to be the starting strong safety his rookie season. In Week 3 of the preseason, Barron intercepted Tom Brady and ran the pick back for his first career NFL touchdown.

He made his professional regular season debut in the Buccaneers' season-opening victory over the Carolina Panthers and finished the game with three solo tackles and two pass deflections. The next game, Barron made a season-high ten combined tackles and two pass deflections in a 41–34 loss at the New York Giants. In Week 4, Barron made eight combined tackles and forced his first career fumble in a 24–22 loss to the Washington Redskins. On October 14, 2012, he collected eight total tackles, a pass deflection, and intercepted Kansas City Chiefs quarterback Brady Quinn for the first of his career, as the Buccaneers routed the Chiefs 38–10. During a Week 14 loss to the New Orleans Saints, Barron racked up a season-high eight solo tackles and two assisted tackles. Barron started the regular season strong with 42 tackles, seven passes defended and one interception in his first six NFL games, but trailed off towards the end of the season before finishing with 89 tackles. He started all 16 games and made the Pro Football Writers Association All-Rookie team, even though the team was the NFL's worst pass defense. He finished his first year under new head coach Greg Schiano with 71 solo tackles, 17 assisted tackles, 10 pass deflections, an interception, and a forced fumble.

==== 2013 ====
Barron returned as the Buccaneers' strong safety to begin his second season under coach Greg Schiano. In the season opener, he made four combined tackles and a pass deflection in an 18–17 loss to the New York Jets. The following week, Barron collected a career-high 13 combined tackles, of which ten were solo, a pass deflection, and made his first career sack on Drew Brees during a 16–14 loss to the New Orleans Saints. During a Week 3 loss to the New England Patriots, Barron finished with 11 combined tackles, was credited with half a sack, and intercepted Tom Brady for his first pick of the season. On November 3, 2013, he racked up ten solo tackles, an assisted tackle, two pass deflections, and intercepted a pass from Russell Wilson in the Buccaneers' 27–24 overtime loss to the Seattle Seahawks. On December 8, 2013, Barron made four solo tackles and made his first career solo sack on Buffalo Bills quarterback EJ Manuel. He missed the last two games of the regular season after suffering a hamstring injury. Barron finished his second season with 88 combined tackles, six pass deflections, two sacks, and two interceptions while starting in 14 games. The Tampa Bay Buccaneers finished their season with a 4–12 record and head coach Greg Schiano was fired after the season.

==== 2014 ====
Under new head coach Lovie Smith, Barron remained as the Buccaneers' starting strong safety to begin his third season. In their season-opener against the Carolina Panthers, Barron made seven combined tackles. On October 5, 2014, he collected a season-high nine combined tackles in a 37–34 overtime loss to the New Orleans Saints. On October 26, 2014, Barron played his last game with the Buccaneers before being unexpectedly traded to the Rams. He finished the 19–13 loss to the Minnesota Vikings with only four combined tackles. In the eight games with the Buccaneers, he made 49 combined tackles and two pass deflections. Barron finished his career with the Buccaneers with 225 combined tackles, 18 pass deflections, three interceptions, two sacks, and a forced fumble while starting 38 games in three seasons.

=== St. Louis / Los Angeles Rams ===
==== 2014 ====
On October 28, 2014, the Buccaneers traded Barron to the St. Louis Rams for a fourth and sixth-round draft pick in the 2015 NFL draft. Barron has gone on record saying he felt "disrespected" and "blindsided" by the trade and that he had no idea he was even being shopped around to other teams. It is reported that he was traded because of behavior that was deemed unprofessional by the team.

On November 2, 2014, Barron made his debut with the St. Louis Rams and recorded one tackle during the 13–10 victory. The next game, he racked up five solo tackles and sacked Arizona Cardinals backup quarterback Drew Stanton during a 31–14 loss. On November 30, 2014, he made his first career start with the Rams and collected two solo tackles and a pass deflection as the Rams routed the Oakland Raiders 52–0. He finished his nine games with the Rams with 23 combined tackles, three sacks, and a pass deflection.

==== 2015 ====
On May 3, 2015, the St. Louis Rams declined to pick up his fifth-year, $8.26 million option on his rookie contract.

Barron entered his first training camp with the St. Louis Rams competing with veteran T. J. McDonald to be the starting strong safety. He was named the backup to McDonald to begin the regular season.

In the season opener against the Seattle Seahawks, Barron made two solo tackles and assisted on three tackles in the 34–31 victory. On October 11, 2015, he received his first start of the season during the Rams' 24–10 loss to the Green Bay Packers and made five combined tackles. The following week, Barron made his first career start at weakside linebacker after Alec Ogletree suffered a broken fibulia He finished the 24–6 victory over the Cleveland Browns with a career-high 16 combined tackles. The St. Louis Rams coaching staff had him credited with 19 combined tackles, two tackles for a loss, and two forced fumbles during his debut against the Browns. The following game, Barron made ten combined tackles and deflected a pass against the San Francisco 49ers. On December 13, 2015, he collected 11 combined tackles during a 21–14 defeat of the Detroit Lions. Barron finished the season with 116 combined tackles, one sack, five pass deflections, and a career-high three forced fumbles. He started 12 games and appeared in all 16 as the Rams finished with a 7–9 record in their last season in St. Louis.

==== 2016 ====
On March 9, 2016, the Los Angeles Rams signed Barron to a five-year, $45 million contract with $20 million guaranteed and a signing bonus of $5 million.

After having a career season in 2015, Barron returned as the Rams' hybrid weakside linebacker. He started the Rams' season-opening game against the San Francisco 49ers, finishing the 28–0 loss with three combined tackles and two deflected passes. The next game, Barron collected nine solo tackles, an assisted tackle, and a pass deflection during the Rams' 9–3 victory over the Seattle Seahawks. In Week 3 win over the Tampa Bay Buccaneers, he racked up nine combined tackles and intercepted quarterback Jameis Winston for his first pick as a Ram. The following week, Barron made eight solo tackles and intercepted Carson Palmer, helping the Rams defeat the Arizona Cardinals 24–22. On November 6, 2016, he collected nine solo tackles and got his first sack of the season on Panthers quarterback Cam Newton. On November 27, 2016, Barron made a season-high 14 combined tackles as the Rams lost 49–21 at the New Orleans Saints. Barron and the Rams finished with a 4–12 record in the team's first season back in Los Angeles. He started in all 16 games in 2016 and recorded a career-high 118 combined tackles (91 solo), eight pass deflections, two interceptions, and a sack.

==== 2017 ====
Head coach Sean McVay named Barron and Alec Ogletree the starting inside linebackers to begin the regular season, alongside outside linebackers Connor Barwin and Robert Quinn. On October 8, 2017, Barron collected a season-high 15 combined tackles (12 solo) during a 16–10 loss to the Seattle Seahawks in Week 5. In Week 15, Barron sustained an injury to his Achilles tendon during a 42–7 victory at the Seattle Seahawks. He was inactive for two games (Weeks 16–17) after injuring his heel. He finished the season with 86 combined tackles (73 solo), four pass deflections, three interceptions, and a sack in 14 games and 14 starts. Pro Football Focus gave Barron an overall grade of 61.8, which ranked 48th among qualified linebackers in 2017.

The Los Angeles Rams finished first in the NFC West with an 11–5 and qualified for the playoffs. On January 6, 2018, Barron started in his first career playoff game and recorded ten combined tackles (eight solo) in a 26–13 loss to the Atlanta Falcons in the Wild Card Round.

==== 2018 ====
Barron started 12 games for the Rams in the 2018 season. He recorded a safety when he tackled Aaron Jones in the endzone in Week 8 against the Green Bay Packers. He finished with one sack, 60 combined tackles, one quarterback hit, one pass defensed, and one forced fumble. The Rams won the NFC West and earned the #2-seed for the NFC Playoffs. In the Divisional Round against the Dallas Cowboys, he had five combined tackles in the victory. In the victory over the New Orleans Saints in the NFC Championship, he had nine combined tackles. In the 13–3 loss to the New England Patriots in Super Bowl LIII, he had eight combined tackles and one pass defended.

On March 5, 2019, Barron was released by the Rams.

=== Pittsburgh Steelers ===
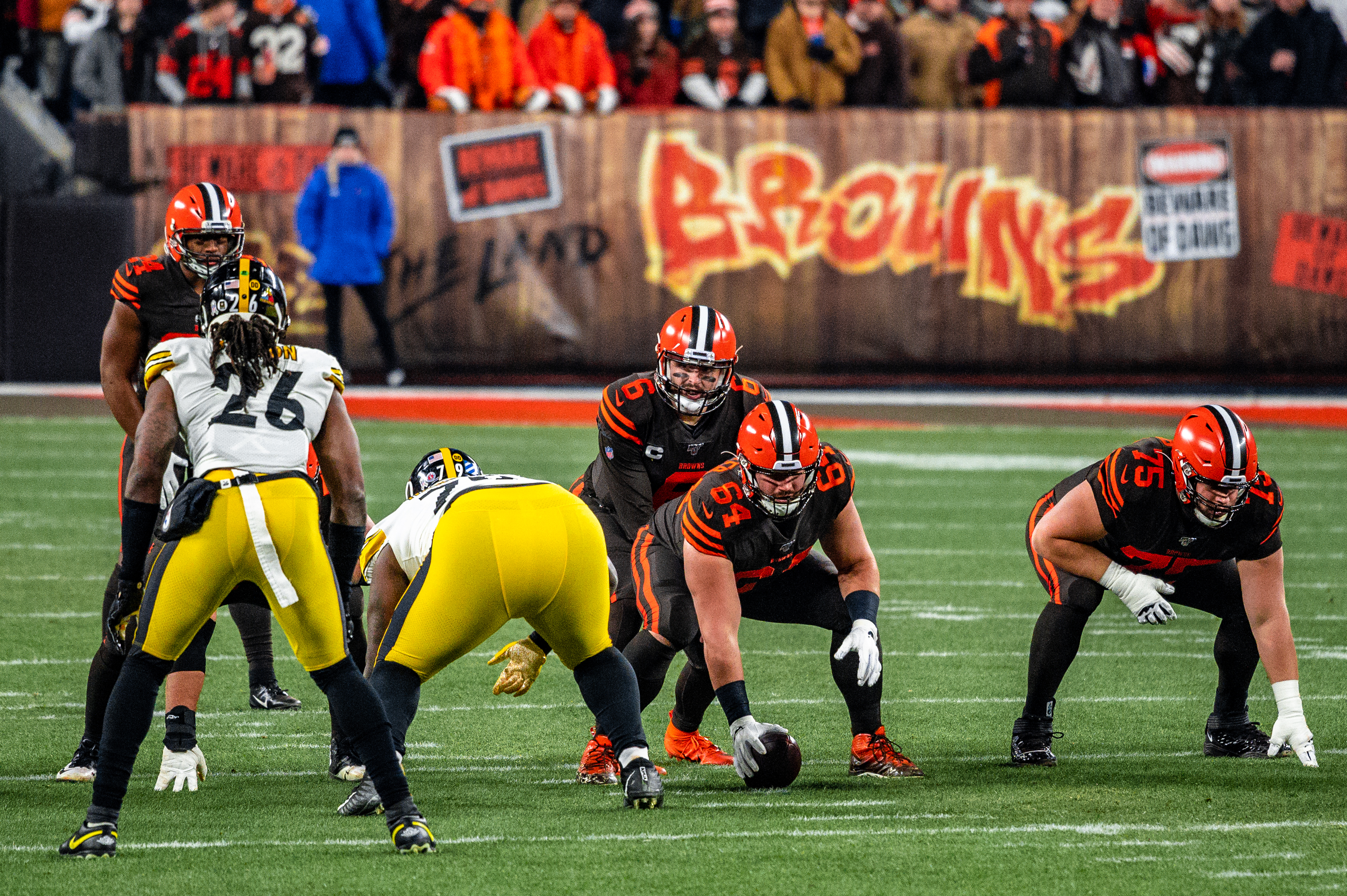
Barron in a game against the Cleveland Browns

On March 17, 2019, Barron signed a two-year, $12 million contract with the Pittsburgh Steelers. Barron made his debut with the Steelers in Week 1 against the New England Patriots. In the game, Barron made six tackles in the 33–3 loss. In Week 4 against the Cincinnati Bengals, Barron recorded a team high 11 tackles and intercepted Andy Dalton in the 27–3 win. In Week 10 against his former team, the Los Angeles Rams, Barron recorded a team high ten tackles in the 17–12 win. Barron finished the 2019 season with 82 tackles, three sacks, and an interception.

The Steelers released Barron on March 16, 2020.

=== Denver Broncos ===
On August 30, 2020, Barron signed with the Denver Broncos. He was placed on injured reserve on September 23, 2020, with a hamstring injury. He was activated on November 25, 2020. On December 22, 2020, Barron was waived by the Broncos.

== Career statistics ==
=== NFL ===
Year	Team	Games		Tackles				Fumbles				Interceptions					
Year	Team	GP	GS	Cmb	Solo	Ast	Sck	FF	FR	Yds	TD	PD	Int	Yds	Avg	Lng	TD
2012	TB	16	16	88	71	17	0.0	1	—	—	—	10	1	12	12.0	12	0
2013	TB	14	14	88	70	18	2.0	—	1	0	0	6	2	3	1.5	3	0
2014	TB	7	7	49	35	14	0.0	—	—	—	—	3	—	—	—	—	—
2014	STL	9	2	23	21	2	3.0	—	1	8	0	1	—	—	—	—	—
2015	STL	16	12	116	79	37	1.0	3	—	—	—	5	—	—	—	—	—
2016	LA	16	16	118	91	27	1.0	—	1	0	0	8	2	8	4.0	7	0
2017	LA	14	14	86	73	13	1.0	—	—	—	—	4	3	29	9.7	15	0
2018	LA	12	12	60	43	17	1.0	1	—	—	—	1	0	0	0.0	0	0
2019	PIT	15	9	82	58	24	3.0	—	1	22	0	3	1	—	—	—	—
Career		119	102	710	541	169	9.0	5	4	30	0	41	9	52	5.8	15	0

=== College ===
Season	Games		Tackles							Interceptions					Fumbles			
Season	GP	GS	Solo	Ast	Cmb	TfL	Yds	Sck	Yds	Int	Yds	BU	PD	QBH	FR	Yds	FF	Blk
2008	14	0	9	9	18	1.5	11	1.5	11	0	0	0	0	0	0	0	0	0
2009	14	14	43	33	76	3.5	18	0.5	2	7	125	11	18	4	0	0	0	0
2010	12	12	54	21	75	3	19	2.0	15	3	6	6	9	2	0	0	1	0
2011	13	13	43	25	68	5	9	1.0	2	2	14	5	7	1	1	0	0	0
Total	53	39	149	88	237	13	57	5	30	12	145	22	34	7	1	0	1	0
