= Jerrell Harris =

American gridiron football player (born 1989)

No. 52
- Position: Linebacker

Personal information
- Born: July 8, 1989 (age 37); Gadsden, Alabama, U.S.
- Listed height: 6 ft 3 in (1.91 m)
- Listed weight: 242 lb (110 kg)

Career information
- High school: Gadsden (AL) City
- College: Alabama
- NFL draft: 2012: undrafted

Career history
- Atlanta Falcons (2012)*; Jacksonville Jaguars (2012)*; New England Patriots (2012)*; Oakland Raiders (2012−2013)*; San Diego Chargers (2013)*; Montreal Alouettes (2013)*; Denver Broncos (2014)*; Detroit Lions (2014–2015)*; Dallas Cowboys (2016)*
- * Offseason or practice squad member only

Awards and highlights
- 2× BCS national champion (2010, 2012)
- Stats at Pro Football Reference

Jerrell Harris (born July 8, 1989) is an American former professional football linebacker who attended the University of Alabama. Harris was an All-American in high school and was considered one of the better outside linebacker prospects of his class.

== Early life ==
Harris attended Gadsden City High School in Alabama, where he was a teammate of fellow Crimson Tide players Kendall Kelly and Dre Kirkpatrick. As a senior, he registered 145 tackles (97 solo), 16 tackles for loss, three pass break-ups, 20 quarterback pressures, four caused fumbles, three recovered fumbles. Harris also returned one fumble for a touchdown and scored on an interception return. He amassed 130 tackles, three interceptions and two sacks as a junior.

Considered a four-star recruit by Rivals.com, Harris was listed as the No. 3 outside linebacker prospect in the country, behind only Nigel Bradham and Arthur Brown. Harris was also considered to be the best run stopper among all linebackers. He chose Alabama over Auburn, Tennessee and Clemson, among others.

== College career ==
He played college football at Alabama. As a member of the Crimson Tide, Harris was a member of two national championship teams. Harris was the player in a viral video where Nick Saban yelled at him in a practice to “run the route again. Damnit, it’s cut.”

== Professional career ==
=== Atlanta Falcons ===
Harris went undrafted in the 2012 NFL draft and was later signed out of free agency by the Atlanta Falcons.

=== Jacksonville Jaguars ===
He was signed to the Jacksonville Jaguars practice squad on September 26, 2012, and released on October 24.

=== New England Patriots ===
He was signed to the New England Patriots practice squad on November 6, 2012, a promotion to the active roster would have reunited him with former Alabama teammate, linebacker Dont'a Hightower. However, Harris was released from the New England Patriots practice squad a week later.

=== Oakland Raiders ===
He was signed by the Oakland Raiders to their practice squad on November 28, 2012. He was released by the Oakland Raiders on May 16, 2013.

=== San Diego Chargers ===
On August 5, 2013, Harris was signed by the San Diego Chargers.

=== Montreal Alouettes ===
Harris signed with the Montreal Alouettes on October 8, 2013.

=== Denver Broncos ===
Harris, along with seven other players, were signed to future contracts with the Denver Broncos on January 22, 2014. The Broncos released him on August 24, 2014.

=== Detroit Lions ===
Harris, along with five other players, were signed to the practice squad with the Detroit Lions on September 17, 2014. He was released on November 11, 2014. He was re-signed on November 25, 2014. On August 4, 2015, Harris was released by the Lions.

=== Dallas Cowboys ===
Harris signed a reserve/futures contract with the Dallas Cowboys on January 20, 2016.
