= Damion Square =

American football player (born 1989)

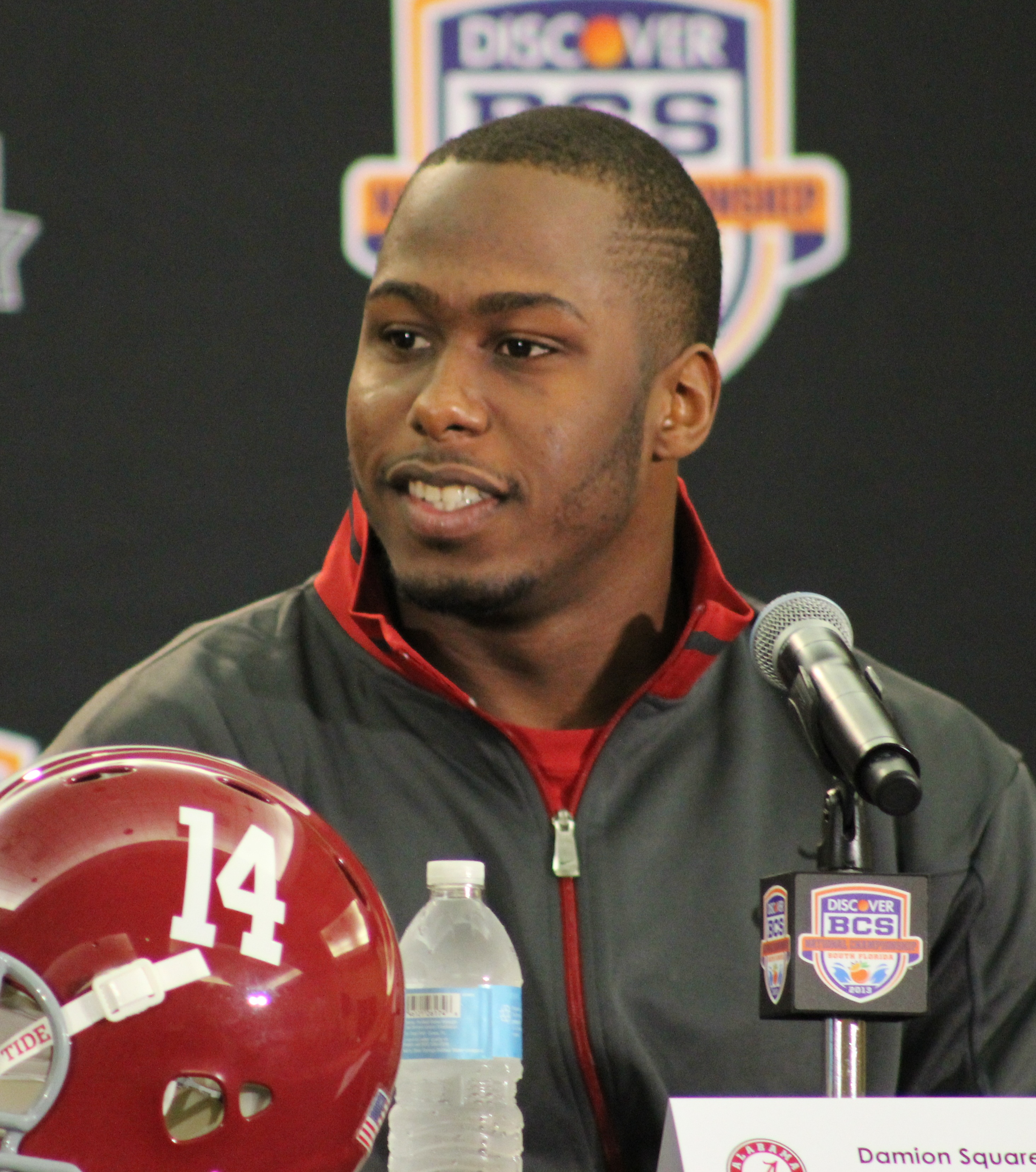
- Square with the Alabama Crimson Tide in 2013

Birmingham Stallions
- Title: Defensive line coach

Personal information
- Born: February 6, 1989 (age 37); Houston, Texas, U.S.
- Listed height: 6 ft 2 in (1.88 m)
- Listed weight: 293 lb (133 kg)

Career information
- Position: Defensive tackle (No. 77, 71, 79, 97, 62)
- High school: Yates (Houston)
- College: Alabama (2008–2012)
- NFL draft: 2013: undrafted

Career history

Playing
- Philadelphia Eagles (2013); Kansas City Chiefs (2014); San Diego / Los Angeles Chargers (2014–2020); Cleveland Browns (2021)*; New Orleans Saints (2021)*; Chicago Bears (2021); Las Vegas Raiders (2021); Cincinnati Bengals (2021)
- * Offseason or practice squad member only

Coaching
- Birmingham Stallions (2026–present) Defensive line coach

Awards and highlights
- BCS national champion (2010, 2012, 2013)

Career NFL statistics
- Total tackles: 100
- Sacks: 5.5
- Fumble recoveries: 2
- Stats at Pro Football Reference

Damion DaShon Square (born February 6, 1989) is an American former professional football player who was a defensive tackle in the National Football League (NFL). He played college football for the Alabama Crimson Tide and was signed as an undrafted free agent by the Philadelphia Eagles in 2013. Square is currently the defensive line coach for the Birmingham Stallions of the United Football League (UFL)

== Early life ==
He was ranked as the ninth overall linebacker prospect in the nation by Scout.com. He also was ranked as the 55th best prospect in the state of Texas by Rivals.com. He was selected to the Preseason All-Greater Team before his senior season at high school. He was selected to the All-Greater Houston team while at high school. He also was named to the third team of Dave Campbell's Texas Football Magazine's Super Team.

College recruiting
Name	Hometown	School	Height	Weight	40^{‡}	Commit date
Damion Square; Defensive tackle	Houston, Texas	Yates High School	6 ft 3 in (1.91 m)	270 lb (120 kg)	4.78	Jan 11, 2008
Damion Square; Defensive tackle	Recruit ratings: Scout: Rivals: 247Sports: (79)					
Overall recruit ranking: Scout: 9 (SLB) Rivals: 37 (DT) 247Sports: 16 (SDE) ESPN: 24 (DE)
‡ Refers to 40-yard dash; Note: In many cases, Scout, Rivals, 247Sports, On3, and ESPN may conflict in their listings of height, weight and 40 time.; In these cases, the average was taken. ESPN grades are on a 100-point scale.; Sources: "2008 Alabama Football Commitments". Rivals.; "2008 Alabama Football Recruiting Commits". Scout.; "Scout.com Team Recruiting Rankings". Scout.; "2008 Team Ranking". Rivals.com.

== College career ==
He played college football at Alabama. In his sophomore season, he finished the season with 27 tackles and 3 sacks. He finished his last two seasons with a total of 65 tackles, 4.5 sacks, and 2 pass deflections. On July 19, 2012, he was selected to the preseason all-SEC second team prior to his senior season. Square was a three-time national champion with the Crimson Tide during his college career.

== Professional career ==
=== Philadelphia Eagles ===
After going undrafted in the 2013 NFL draft, Square was signed as a free agent by the Philadelphia Eagles. He was released by the Eagles on August 30, 2014.

=== Kansas City Chiefs ===
Square was claimed off waivers by the Kansas City Chiefs on September 1, 2014. He was released by the Chiefs on October 31.

=== San Diego / Los Angeles Chargers ===
After he was released by the Chiefs, Square was claimed off waivers by the San Diego Chargers on November 3, 2014. On March 11, 2016, he was re-signed by the Chargers to a one-year contract. On September 3, 2016, he was suspended by the NFL for the first four games of the 2016 NFL season.

On March 10, 2017, Square signed a two-year contract extension with the Chargers. He then signed one-year contracts in 2019 and 2020. He was placed on the active/non-football injury list to start training camp on August 2, 2020, and was activated five days later.

=== Cleveland Browns ===
On May 4, 2021, Square signed with the Cleveland Browns. The Browns terminated Square's contract on August 19, 2021.

=== New Orleans Saints ===
On August 27, 2021, Square signed with the New Orleans Saints, but was released four days later.

=== Chicago Bears ===
On September 8, 2021, Square was signed to the Chicago Bears practice squad.

=== Las Vegas Raiders ===
On September 15, 2021, Square was signed by the Las Vegas Raiders off the Bears practice squad. He was waived by the Raiders on December 11, 2021, and re-signed to the practice squad.

=== Cincinnati Bengals ===
On January 25, 2022, Square was signed to the Cincinnati Bengals practice squad. On January 30, Square became the first player in NFL history to play for two teams in one postseason.

=== Retirement ===
On December 11, 2023, Square signed a one-day contract to retire as a member of the Chargers.

== Personal life ==
Square's wife is named Brandi. They have a son, and a daughter born in November 2015.

== External linker ==
- Damion Square on X
- Alabama Crimson Tide bio
- Pro Football reference
