= Jeremy Shelley =

American football player (born 1990)

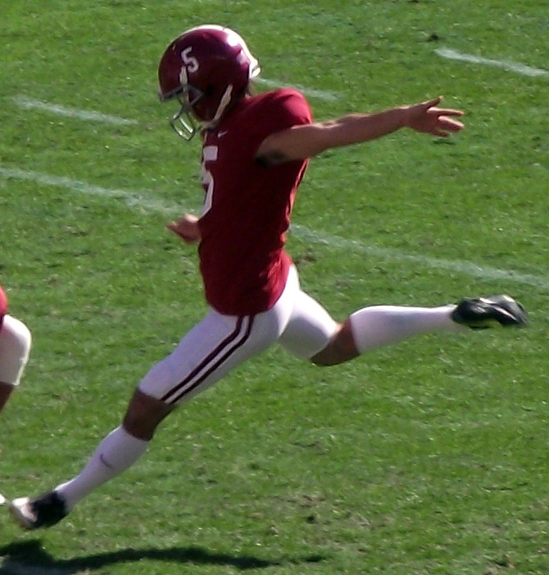
- Shelley with the Alabama Crimson Tide in 2012

No. 12
- Position: Placekicker

Personal information
- Born: October 25, 1990 (age 36); Raleigh, North Carolina, U.S.
- Listed height: 5 ft 10 in (1.78 m)
- Listed weight: 165 lb (75 kg)

Career information
- High school: Broughton (Raleigh)
- College: Alabama
- NFL draft: 2013: undrafted

Career history
- Atlanta Falcons (2013)*; Arizona Rattlers (2015)
- * Offseason or practice squad member only

Awards and highlights
- 3× BCS national champion (2010, 2012, 2013); Vlade Award (2012)

Jeremy Shelley (born October 25, 1990) is an American former football player. He played college football for the Alabama Crimson Tide.

== Early life ==
Shelley attended Needham B. Broughton High School in Raleigh, North Carolina, playing varsity football and varsity soccer all four years. In his senior season at Broughton, he made 10 out of 13 field goal attempts including his longest attempt of 48 yards. He also played on two North Carolina High School Athletic Association state championship soccer teams in 2006 and 2007, with the 2007 team finishing ranked number one in the country. On October 9, 2008, Shelley earned the WRAL Extra Effort Award presented by Tom Suiter.

== College career ==
In his freshman season at the University of Alabama, Shelley was the backup placekicker for the Crimson Tide behind Leigh Tiffin and made only one appearance in which he missed his only field goal attempt along with making his only extra point attempt during that season. On January 9, 2012, he set a BCS National Championship Game record and a career-high for field goals made against LSU in which he made five of his seven attempts. In the 2012 BCS National Championship Game, Shelley made kicks of 23, 34, 41, 35 and 44 yards. In his junior and senior years, Shelley was one of twenty semifinalists for the Lou Groza Award at the conclusion of the season. He finished his college career with a total 44 made field goals out of 55 field goal attempts and 172 PATs (an Alabama record), ranking him the 5th all-time leading scorer in Alabama history. In his Senior year, he was perfect, making every field goal and extra point he attempted, earning him the Vlade Award presented by the Touchdown Club of Columbus as the nation's most accurate kicker.

== Professional career ==
After going undrafted in the 2013 NFL draft, Shelley was signed as a free agent by the Atlanta Falcons. He was later waived from the Atlanta roster on August 31, 2013.

On March 26, 2015, Shelley was assigned to the Arizona Rattlers of the Arena Football League.
