= 2012 BCS National Championship Game =

College football bowl game

2012 Allstate BCS National Championship Game
- 14th BCS National Championship Game
Alabama Crimson Tide	LSU Tigers
(11–1)	(13–0)
SEC	SEC
21	0
Head coach: Nick Saban	Head coach: Les Miles
AP / Coaches / BCS; 2 / 2 / 2	AP / Coaches / BCS; 1 / 1 / 1
	1	2	3	4	Total
Alabama	3	6	6	6	21
LSU	0	0	0	0	0
- Date: January 9, 2012
- Season: 2011
- Stadium: Mercedes-Benz Superdome
- Location: New Orleans, Louisiana
- MVP: Offense: A. J. McCarron (QB, Alabama); Defense: Courtney Upshaw (LB, Alabama)
- Favorite: Alabama by 1.5
- Referee: Scott Novak (Big 12)
- Halftime show: Louisiana State University Tiger Marching Band; Million Dollar Band
- Attendance: 78,237
- Payout: US$21.2 million

United States TV coverage
- Network: ESPN
- Announcers: Brent Musburger (play-by-play); Kirk Herbstreit (analyst); Erin Andrews and Tom Rinaldi (sidelines)
- Nielsen ratings: 16.2 (24.2 million viewers)

The 2012 BCS National Championship Game (branded as the 2012 Allstate BCS National Championship Game for sponsorship reasons) was a postseason college football bowl game between the Alabama Crimson Tide and the LSU Tigers, and determined the national champion of the 2011 NCAA Division I FBS football season on Monday, January 9, 2012, at the Mercedes-Benz Superdome in New Orleans, Louisiana. The game was part of the 2011–2012 Bowl Championship Series and a rematch of regular season foes. Alabama beat LSU 21–0 to win their 14th national championship, marking the first shutout in a national championship game since the 1992 Orange Bowl and the first ever shutout in a BCS bowl game. The game had the third-lowest TV rating, 14.01, in the 14-year history of the BCS National Championship game.

It was LSU's first loss in a game played in New Orleans (which is near the LSU campus in Baton Rouge) since the 1987 Sugar Bowl. From 1987 through the 2011 regular season, LSU was 4–0 in bowl games in New Orleans (three Sugar Bowls and the 2008 BCS National Championship Game) and 5–0 in the city vs. Tulane.

== Teams ==
LSU was selected to participate in the BCS National Championship Game after a 13–0 regular season that culminated with a 42–10 win over the University of Georgia in the 2011 SEC Championship Game. Alabama was picked as the other half of the match-up following an 11–1 campaign, with their only loss coming against LSU in overtime during the regular season. Over the following weeks, a series of upsets resulted in the Crimson Tide receiving a No. 2 ranking in the final BCS Rankings to qualify for the championship game. The selection of Alabama was controversial, and decried by writers such as Rick Reilly, and by fans who claimed other opponents, most prominently the Oklahoma State Cowboys (who finished second in most of the computer rankings), were more deserving of a spot in the game. The controversy lent support to the ever-increasing call for a college football playoff and supposed SEC bias, specifically with regard to Alabama. Ironically, it was the conferences whose teams finished third and fourth (the Big 12 and the Pac-12) that had rejected the SEC's proposal for a four-team playoff in 2008.

This game was the first time in the 14-year history of the BCS that the National Championship Game featured two teams from the same conference, let alone the same division (similar to the 2011 NCAA Division I baseball tournament six months prior featuring two teams from the SEC East division, though that came about through a playoff). This was also the first time that the BCS National Championship Game was a rematch from a regular season game, although the 1996 season's Bowl Alliance National Championship game was also a rematch, when Florida defeated Florida State 52–20 for the national title in the 1997 Sugar Bowl. As a result of the matchup, the SEC's streak of producing the BCS champion was assured of extending to six straight seasons.

=== Alabama ===
Alabama ranked first in rushing with 219.83 yards per game and in total defense (191.25 ypg), including scoring defense (8.83), rushing (74.92 yards per game) and passing (116.33 yards per game). Key players for the Crimson Tide were RB Trent Richardson (164.67 yards per game, 1583 rushing yards), OT Barrett Jones (Outland Trophy recipient), LB Courtney Upshaw (17 tackles for losses and 8.5 sacks), and S Mark Barron (66 total tackles, 42 solos).

=== LSU ===
LSU ranked first in the conference in scoring offense (38.46) and second in the nation in total defense (252.08 yards). The Tigers averaged 375.31 yards per game with 215.15 yards in rushing and 160.15 yards in passing. The leaders of this team were CB Tyrann Mathieu (Chuck Bednarik Award recipient), CB Morris Claiborne (Jim Thorpe Award recipient, six interceptions for 173 yards, 1 TD and 6th overall draft pick), DE Sam Montgomery (13 tackles for loss, 9 sacks for −55 yards), WR Rueben Randle (53 receptions, 917 yards, and 8 TD's) and P Brad Wing (44.14 punt average).

== Starting lineups ==
Selected in an NFL Draft (number corresponds to draft round)

† = 2011 All-American

Alabama	Position		LSU
Offense
Marquis Maze	WR		Rueben Randle 2
Brad Smelley 7	TE	WR	Russell Shepard
†Barrett Jones 4	LT		Chris Faulk
Chance Warmack 1	LG		Will Blackwell
William Vlachos	C		P.J. Lonergan
Alfred McCullough	RG		Josh Willford
D. J. Fluker 1	RT		Alex Hurst
Michael Williams 7	TE		DeAngelo Peterson
Darius Hanks	WR		Odell Beckham Jr. 1
A. J. McCarron 5	QB		Jordan Jefferson
†Trent Richardson 1	RB		Michael Ford
Defense
Jesse Williams 5	DE		Kendrick Adams
Josh Chapman 5	DT		Michael Brockers 1
Damion Square	DE	DT	Bennie Logan 3
Jerrell Harris	OLB	DE	Sam Montgomery 3
Dont'a Hightower 1	MLB	LOLB	Stefoin Francis
Nico Johnson 4	ILB		Kevin Minter 2
Courtney Upshaw 2	ROLB		Ryan Baker
DeQuan Menzie 5	CB		†Morris Claiborne 1
Dre Kirkpatrick 1	CB		† Tyrann Mathieu 3
†Mark Barron 1	FS		Eric Reid 1
Robert Lester	SS		Brandon Taylor 3

== Game summary ==
Alabama won the coin toss with a call of "tails" and elected to defer their decision to the second half.

The game, largely a defensive struggle, was epitomized by LSU's first possession of the game. The Tigers fumbled the ball on the opening play and ultimately ended up punting the football to Alabama after failing to gain a first down. The rest of the first half was dominated by both defenses. Alabama got within field goal range four times and kicker Jeremy Shelley made three of his attempts to give Alabama a 9–0 lead at halftime. LSU gained only one first down and was unable to cross the 50-yard line for the entire first half.

The second half played out much the same as the first. Alabama's defense allowed LSU to cross the 50-yard line only once and gave up only four more first downs. Alabama was able to add 6 more points from a couple of Shelley field goals and another 6 points on the game's only touchdown on a 34-yard rush by Heisman Trophy finalist Trent Richardson.

Scoring summary

Quarter	Time	Drive			Team	Scoring information	Score	
Quarter	Time	Plays	Yards	TOP	Team	Scoring information	Alabama	LSU
1	5:00	5	20	1:54	Alabama	23-yard field goal by Jeremy Shelley	3	0
2	4:18	11	58	6:12	Alabama	34-yard field goal by Jeremy Shelley	6	0
2	0:00	9	52	1:59	Alabama	41-yard field goal by Jeremy Shelley	9	0
3	12:49	6	50	2:11	Alabama	35-yard field goal by Jeremy Shelley	12	0
3	0:22	6	20	3:01	Alabama	44-yard field goal by Jeremy Shelley	15	0
4	4:36	4	50	1:39	Alabama	Trent Richardson 34-yard touchdown run, Jeremy Shelley kick no good (miss right)	21	0
"TOP" = time of possession. For other American football terms, see Glossary of American football.							21	0

=== Statistics ===
Statistics	Alabama	LSU
First downs	21	5
Total offense, plays – yards	69–384	44–92
Rushes-yards (net)	35–150	27–39
Passing yards (net)	234	53
Passes, Comp-Att-Int	23–34–0	11–17–1
Time of Possession	35:26	24:34

== See also ==
- Alabama–LSU football rivalry
- 2011 LSU vs. Alabama football game
- List of college football post-season games that were rematches of regular season games
