= Darius Hanks =

American football player (born 1989)

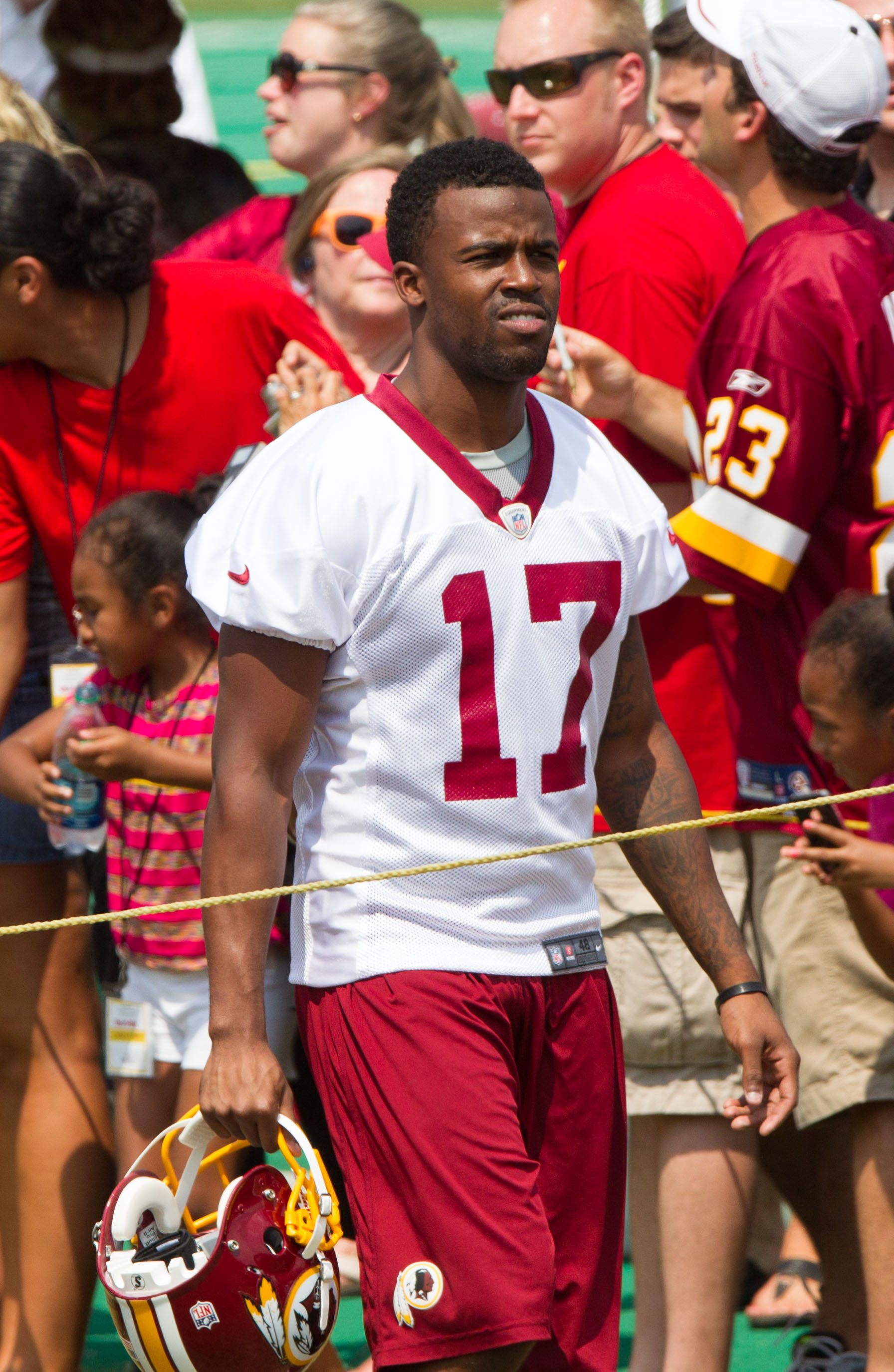
- Hanks at Redskins training camp in 2012.

No. 17
- Position: Wide receiver

Personal information
- Born: February 23, 1989 (age 37); Bronxville, New York , U.S.
- Listed height: 6 ft 0 in (1.83 m)
- Listed weight: 187 lb (85 kg)

Career information
- High school: Norcross (GA)
- College: Alabama
- NFL draft: 2012: undrafted

Career history
- Washington Redskins (2012)

Awards and highlights
- BCS national champion (2010, 2012)
- Stats at Pro Football Reference

Darius Hanks (born February 23, 1989) is an American former football wide receiver. He played college football at the University of Alabama. Despite being projected as a fifth round draft pick, he was signed by the Washington Redskins as an undrafted free agent in 2012.

== Professional career ==
Pre-draft measurables
Height	Weight	Arm length	Hand span	40-yard dash	Vertical jump	Broad jump	Bench press
6 ft 0 in (1.83 m)	184 lb (83 kg)	31 3/4	9 1/2	4.66 s	34.0 in (0.86 m)	9 ft 9 in (2.97 m)	11 reps
All values from NFL Combine

Hanks was signed by the Washington Redskins as an undrafted free agent on April 29, 2012. He was waived-injured on August 13 due to suffering a shoulder injury when making a diving catch during training camp. After not being claimed off waivers, Hanks was officially put on the team's injured reserve list.

In April 2013, Hanks was waived by the Redskins after failing a physical.
