= DeQuan Menzie =

American football player (born 1990)

No. 49
- Position: Cornerback

Personal information
- Born: January 11, 1990 (age 36); Columbus, Georgia, U.S.
- Listed height: 5 ft 11 in (1.80 m)
- Listed weight: 202 lb (92 kg)

Career information
- High school: Carver (Columbus)
- College: Alabama
- NFL draft: 2012: 5th round, 146th overall pick

Career history
- Kansas City Chiefs (2012); Detroit Lions (2013)*; Carolina Panthers (2014)*
- * Offseason or practice squad member only

Awards and highlights
- BCS national champion (2012); First-team All-American (2011)
- Stats at Pro Football Reference

DeQuan Menzie (born January 11, 1990) is an American former professional football player who was a cornerback in the National Football League (NFL). He played college football for the Alabama Crimson Tide.

== Early life ==
Menzie played high school football at Carver High School in Columbus, Georgia, where he played under coach Dell McGee. Menzie led Caver to the 2007 GHSA AAA state championship.

== College career ==
Menzie attended Copiah-Lincoln Community College in 2008 and 2009. He transferred to the University of Alabama in 2010. As a senior in 2011, he was an AFCA first-team All-American and was a member of the Crimson Tide team that beat LSU in the 2012 BCS National Championship Game.

== Professional career ==
=== Kansas City Chiefs ===
Menzie was selected by the Kansas City Chiefs in the fifth round with the 146th overall pick in the 2012 NFL draft. The Chiefs released him on May 13, 2013.

=== Detroit Lions ===
The Detroit Lions claimed Menzie off waivers on May 15, 2013. He was released as part of final cuts on August 27, 2013.

=== Carolina Panthers ===
The Carolina Panthers signed Menzie to a reserve/future contract January 3, 2014. He was released by the Panthers on July 26, 2014, and announced his retirement the next day.
