= 2010 BCS National Championship Game =

College football bowl game

2010 Citi BCS National Championship Game
- 12th BCS National Championship Game
Texas Longhorns	Alabama Crimson Tide
(13–0)	(13–0)
Big 12	SEC
21	37
Head coach: Mack Brown	Head coach: Nick Saban
AP / Coaches / BCS; 2 / 2 / 2	AP / Coaches / BCS; 1 / 1 / 1
	1	2	3	4	Total
Texas	6	0	7	8	21
Alabama	0	24	0	13	37
- Date: January 7, 2010
- Season: 2009
- Stadium: Rose Bowl
- Location: Pasadena, California
- MVP: Offense: Mark Ingram II (RB, Alabama); Defense: Marcell Dareus (DE, Alabama)
- Favorite: Alabama by 4
- National anthem: Josh Groban and Flea
- Referee: John McDaid (Big East)
- Halftime show: Million Dollar Band; University of Texas Longhorn Band
- Attendance: 94,906
- Payout: US$31 million (estimated)

United States TV coverage
- Network: ABC
- Announcers: Brent Musburger (play-by-play); Kirk Herbstreit (analyst); Tom Rinaldi and Lisa Salters (sideline)
- Nielsen ratings: 17.2 (28.5 million viewers)

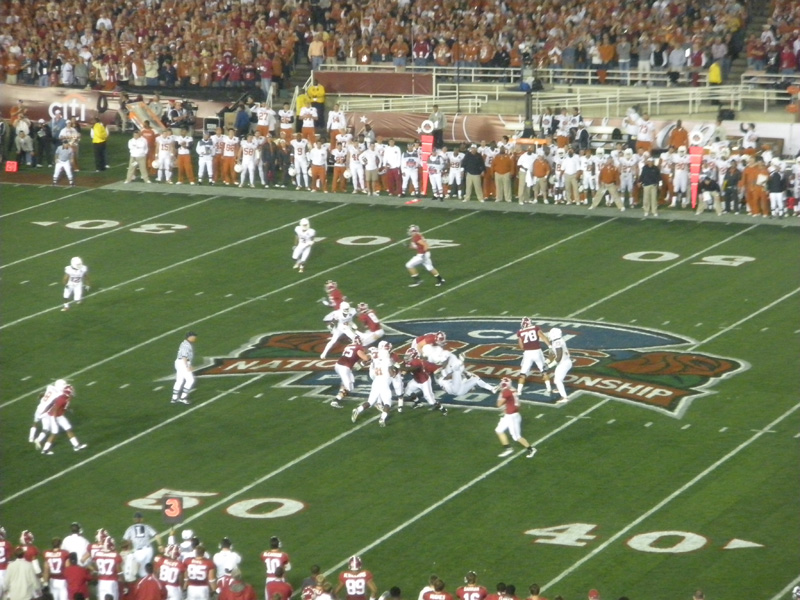
50-yard line action for the national championship in Pasadena, California, January 7, 2010.

The 2010 BCS National Championship Game (branded as the 2010 Citi BCS National Championship Game for sponsorship reasons) was a college football bowl game to determine the national champion of the 2009 NCAA Division I FBS football season, and was played between the Texas Longhorns and the Alabama Crimson Tide. It was hosted by the Pasadena Tournament of Roses Association at the Rose Bowl Stadium in Pasadena, California, January 7, 2010. It was the 12th BCS National Championship Game, and the second consecutive year the champion of the Southeastern Conference (SEC) was matched against the champion of the Big 12 Conference. Alabama got the win over Texas, 37-21, to complete a perfect 14-0 season and clinch the school's 13th national championship and first since 1992.

The game was the ninth meeting of Texas and Alabama, though the first since the 1982 Cotton Bowl Classic. Prior to the game, Texas led the all-time series with a 7–0–1 record, with the first meeting in 1902.

The match-up was the third game in which the Tournament of Roses hosted the BCS National Championship game in Pasadena, and the fifth time, overall, that it has hosted a No. 1 versus No. 2 match-up. However, this was the first time the Tournament of Roses hosted the game as a separate event from the Rose Bowl Game. They had previously hosted BCS Championship games in the 2006 and 2002 Rose Bowls, and pre-BCS No. 1 versus No. 2 match-ups in the 1969 and 1963 Rose Bowls.

With the win, Alabama became only the third team to complete a 14-0 season (after Ohio State in 2002, and Boise State just three nights earlier in the Fiesta Bowl).

ABC televised the game, as well as the Rose Bowl; Fox televised the remainder of the BCS. The match-up was the final BCS game to air on broadcast television, with cable network ESPN taking over all Bowl Championship Series telecasts starting in 2011. It was also the last national championship game to be televised on broadcast television until 2027. Following the game in June, Citi decided to end the sponsorship of any future Rose Bowl games, including the National Championship game.

== Pregame ceremonies ==
Audra McDonald performed America the Beautiful prior to the teams taking the field, while Red Hot Chili Peppers bassist Flea and Josh Groban performed the Star-Spangled Banner. United States Air Force Academy parachute jumpers, Wings of Blue, dropped in before the National Anthem and 4 F-18 Super Hornets flew over at the conclusion. Keith Jackson, long-time ABC Sports college football play-by-play announcer, performed the coin toss.

== Teams ==
Texas wore its white jerseys and was situated on the east sideline, and Alabama wore its crimson jerseys and used the west bench at the Rose Bowl stadium.

The two programs that played in this game had won a combined eleven poll-era national championships. Texas had won four, most recently in 2005, and Alabama had won seven, most recently in 1992. Texas had participated in three previous BCS Bowl games and was only one of two teams who were undefeated and had played in at least three BCS Bowls. Alabama had played in two previous BCS Bowl games, 2009 Sugar Bowl and 2000 Orange Bowl losing both.

Texas was leading the all-time series with Alabama by a 7–0–1 count (2–0 in Austin, 2–0 in Dallas, 1–0 in Miami, 1–0 in New Orleans, 1–0 in Tuscaloosa, 0–0–1 in Houston).

Following this appearance by Texas, the next Big 12 team to reach a national championship game was the 2022 TCU Horned Frogs, in the 2023 edition of the championship.

== Scoring summary ==
Quarter	Time	Drive		Team	Scoring information	Score	
Quarter	Time	Length	Time	Team	Scoring information	Texas	Alabama
1	9:11	10 plays, 36 yards	3:50	Texas	Hunter Lawrence 18–yard field goal	3	0
1	8:04	4 plays, 5 yards	1:07	Texas	Hunter Lawrence 42–yard field goal	6	0
2	14:18	7 plays, 57 yards	3:24	Alabama	Mark Ingram II 2–yard run, Leigh Tiffin kick good	6	7
2	7:59	2 plays, 49 yards	0:45	Alabama	Trent Richardson 49–yard run, Leigh Tiffin kick good	6	14
2	0:29	6 plays, 20 yards	1:51	Alabama	Leigh Tiffin 26–yard field goal	6	17
2	0:03	—		Alabama	Marcell Dareus 28–yard interception return, Leigh Tiffin kick good	6	24
3	1:31	5 plays, 59 yards	1:44	Texas	Jordan Shipley 44–yard reception from Garrett Gilbert, Hunter Lawrence kick good	13	24
4	6:15	10 plays, 65 yards	4:58	Texas	Jordan Shipley 28–yard reception from Garrett Gilbert, two-point conversion good	21	24
4	2:01	3 plays, 3 yards	1:01	Alabama	Mark Ingram II 1–yard run, Leigh Tiffin kick good	21	31
4	0:47	3 plays, 27 yards	1:01	Alabama	Trent Richardson 2–yard run, Leigh Tiffin kick no good	21	37
Final score						21	37

=== Statistics ===
Statistics	Texas	Alabama
First downs	15	16
Rushes–yards (net)	28–81	51–205
Passing yards (net)	195	58
Passes, Att–Comp–Int	42–17–4	12–6–1
Total offense, plays – yards	70–276	63–263
Time of possession	26:21	33:39
