= Dre Kirkpatrick Jr =

American college football player

Dre Kirkpatrick Jr.
Profile
- Position: Defensive back
- Class: Junior

Personal information
- Listed height: 5 ft 11 in (1.80 m)
- Listed weight: 207 lb (94 kg)

Career information
- High school: Gadsden (Gadsden, Alabama)
- College: Alabama (2024–2026)
- Stats at ESPN

Dre Kirkpatrick Jr. is a former American college football defensive back. He is the son of former NFL cornerback Dre Kirkpatrick.

== Early life and high school ==
Kirkpatrick played high school football for Gadsden City High School in Gadsden, Alabama where he developed as a defensive back and became a Division I recruit. He received attention and offers from multiple programs before ultimately committing to Alabama.

== College career ==
Kirkpatrick joined Alabama as part of its 2024 recruiting class. He has been part of the team's defensive back group and appeared in 8 games during the 2025 season, working as reserve defensive back and special teams. Kirkpatrick had 9 total tackles, one tackle for loss, one forced fumble, and a pass breakup against Georgia. He was suspended for the last seven games of the 2025 season after he was arrested in November. After a second arrest, Kirkpatrick was dismissed from the team by head coach Kalen DeBoer.

== Personal life ==
He is the son of former NFL and Alabama cornerback, Dre Kirkpatrick, who played in the league for several seasons. He is the first and only legacy recruit of Alabama Coach Nick Saban.
