= Mort Glosser Amphitheater =

- Legion Park Bowl
- U.S. National Register of Historic Places
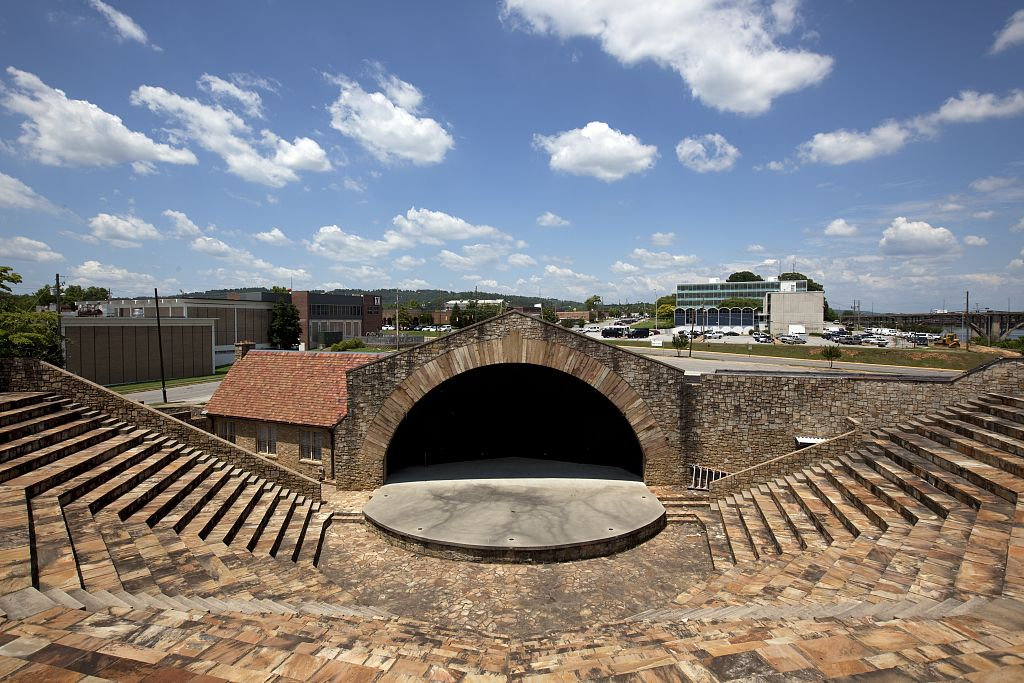
- The amphitheater in 2010

- Location within Alabama Location within the United States
- Location: 336 1st St., S., Gadsden, Alabama
- Coordinates: 34°0′30″N 86°0′5″W
- Area: 1 acre (0.40 ha)
- Built: 1935
- Architect: Paul W. Hofferbert
- Architectural style: English Picturesque
- NRHP reference No.: 88001581
- Added to NRHP: September 28, 1988

Mort Glosser Amphitheater (formerly known as the Legion Park Bowl and Gadsden Municipal Amphitheatre) is an amphitheatre in Gadsden, Alabama, United States. Built in 1935, it was added to the National Register of Historic Places in 1988.

== History ==
The amphitheater was constructed in 1934–35 by the Works Progress Administration. It was built alongside the Gadsden Municipal Auditorium along the Coosa River. Originally owned by the American Legion and named Legion Park Bowl, it was used during World War II as a USO entertainment center for soldiers stationed locally at Camp Sibert. Outside of wartime, it hosted boxing matches, concerts, plays, haunted houses, and political rallies, among other events.

The City of Gadsden purchased the amphitheater in 1986 and began restoration of the facility. It was renamed to honor Dr. Mort Glosser, a longtime band director at Gadsden High School (1936-1959) and later superintendent of Gadsden City Schools, retiring in 1975.

== Architecture ==
Designed by local architect Paul W. Hofferbert, the amphitheater was constructed using stone quarried from Lookout Mountain. The seating area is a half-hexagon with the stage on the north end. The stage is partially covered by a timber-frame proscenium arch finished with stone. A club room, rectangular with a steeply pitched roof, sits to the northwest of the stage. Entrances to the amphitheater are behind the seating area, with a hexagonal gatehouse, and a lower entrance next to the club room, accessible through a stone-walled courtyard. The amphitheater seats 1600.
