= Gadsden City Schools =

School district in Alabama

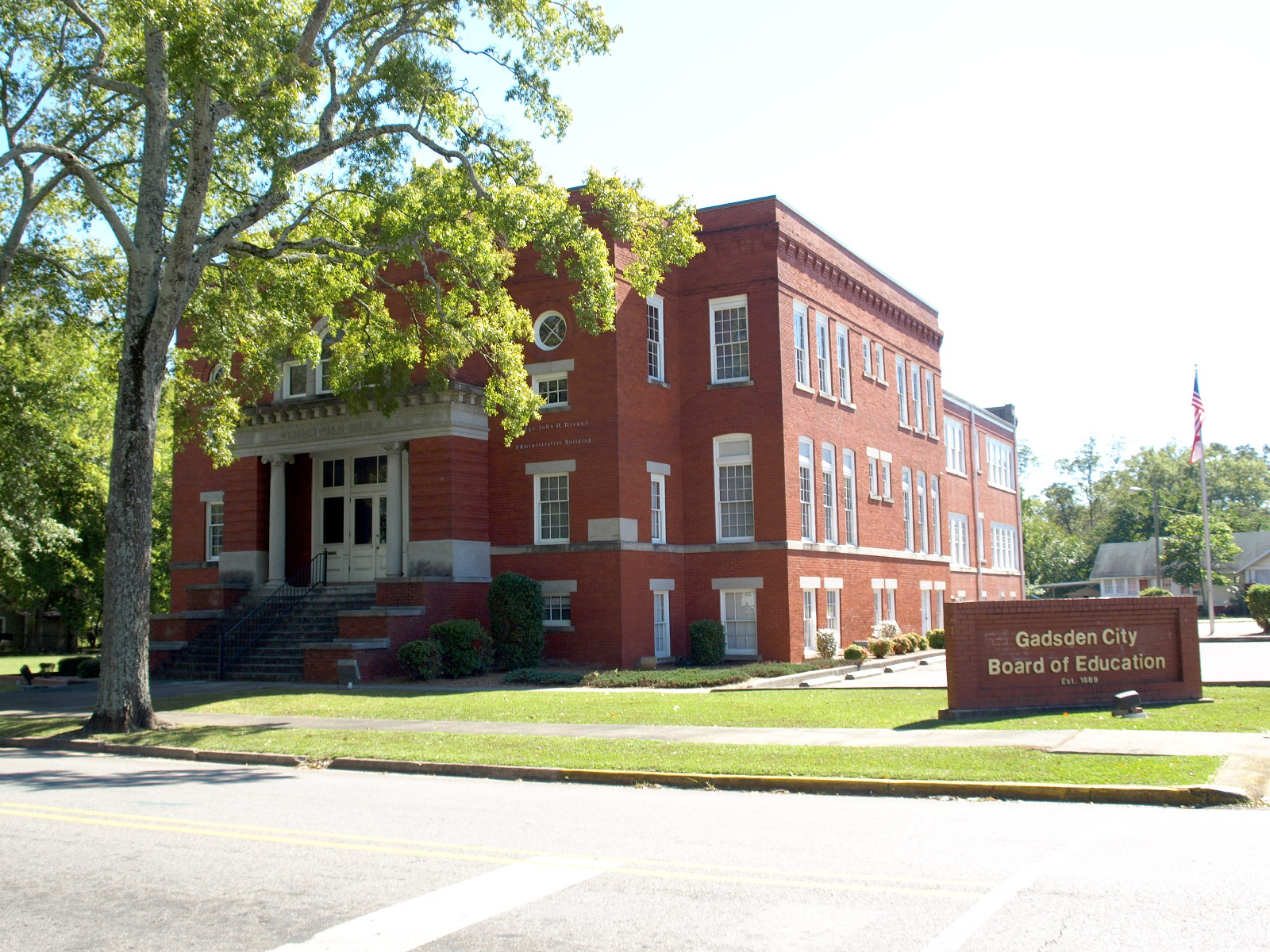
Judge John H. Disque Administration Building a.k.a. Eleventh Street School

Gadsden City School District is a school district in Etowah County, Alabama, USA.

The district has seven elementary schools, three middle schools and one high school, Gadsden City High School.

The district's boundaries are that of the municipal boundary of Gadsden.

== Gadsden Middle School ==
Gadsden Middle School (Alabama) is one of three middle schools in the Gadsden City Schools system, located in Gadsden, Alabama and serving grades 6 through 9. The school is accredited by the Southern Association of Colleges and Schools.

=== History ===
In 1901, Gadsden's first public high school, Disque High School, was opened at the corner of Chestnut and College Streets. It was named in honor of Gadsden City School Board chairman and Judge John H. Disque. In 1924, it became Disque Junior High School when the larger Gadsden High School was opened. The original DJHS site was demolished in 1962, and the Gadsden Post Office was built in its place. DJHS moved into the then-new Tracy Street building for the 1962–63 school year, serving grades 7 through 9. In the 1980s, Disque Junior High School was renamed Disque Middle School and began serving grades 6 through 8; grade 9 shifted to Gadsden High School.

On January 12, 2006, the Gadsden City Board of Education voted to rename Disque Middle School to Gadsden Middle School, beginning in the 2006–07 school year. This name change coincided with the consolidation of Gadsden City's three high schools at the time―Emma Sansom High School, Gadsden High School, and Litchfield High School―into a single Gadsden City High School, as well as the associated relocation and renaming of both General Forrest Middle School (to Emma Sansom Middle School) and Cory Middle School (to Litchfield Middle School).

== Athletics and activities ==
Gadsden Middle students and teams are called the Tigers, and the official school colors are orange and black. Sports teams include boys' and girls' basketball, football, and cheerleading. The GMS Tiger Band offers marching and concert opportunities, both in class and outside of school, including working with the Gadsden City Titan Band and helping with the Mid South Marching Band Festival. The GMS Tiger Quiz Bowl team competes regionally, state-wide, and nationally.
