= WTDR =

WTDR may refer to:

- WTDR (AM), a radio station (1350 AM) licensed to serve Gadsden, Alabama, United States
- WTDR-FM, a radio station (92.7 FM) licensed to Talladega, Alabama
- WKKT, a radio station (96.9 FM) licensed to Statesville, North Carolina, United States, which held the call sign WTDR from 1990 to 1997
