= Eleventh Street School =

- U.S. National Register of Historic Places
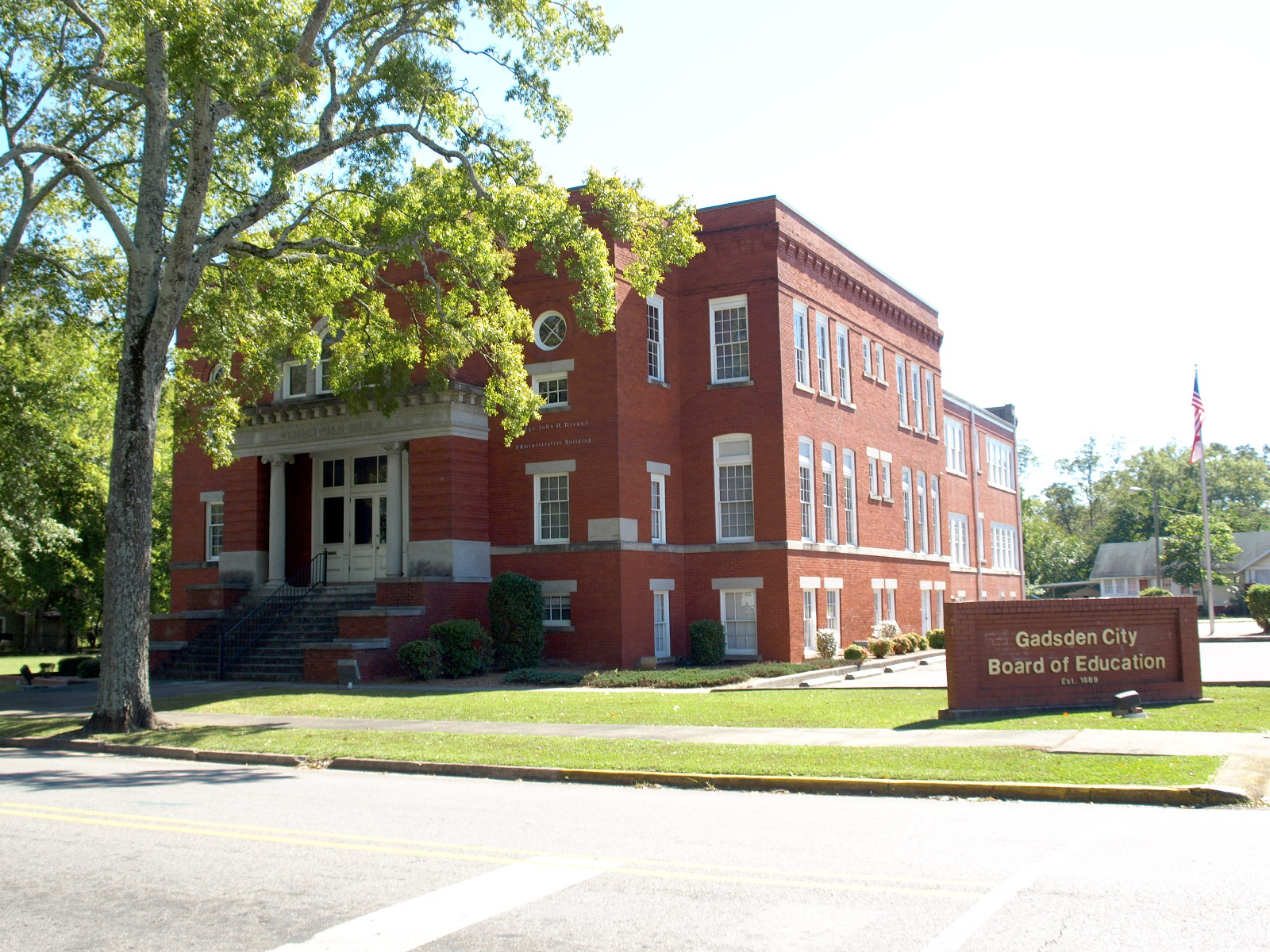
- The school in October 2014

- Location within Alabama Location within the United States
- Location: 1026 Chestnut St., Gadsden, Alabama
- Coordinates: 34°0′49″N 86°1′5″W
- Area: 1.2 acres (0.49 ha)
- Built: 1907
- Architect: A. D. Simpson
- NRHP reference No.: 84000616
- Added to NRHP: May 10, 1984

The Eleventh Street School (a.k.a. John H. Disque Administrative Building) is a historic building in Gadsden, Alabama, United States. Built in 1907, it is the oldest surviving public school in Gadsden. An addition of eight classrooms, a lunchroom, and two other rooms was added in 1926. The building operated as a school until 1962, and later served as an adult education center and storage and offices for the city board of education. The building is two stories with a partially above-ground basement. The façade has stone steps leading to a shallow portico, with two Ionic columns supporting a denticulated cornice. Above the portico sits a Palladian window. The building was listed on the National Register of Historic Places in 1984.

It is the headquarters of Gadsden City Schools. It received the Disque name in 2008.
