= Rex Keeling =

American football player (1943–2010)

No. 44
- Position: Punter

Personal information
- Born: September 9, 1943; Dallas, Texas, U.S.
- Died: June 3, 2010 (aged 66); Fort Payne, Alabama, U.S.
- Listed height: 6 ft 4 in (1.93 m)
- Listed weight: 205 lb (93 kg)

Career information
- High school: Gadsden (Gadsden, Alabama)
- College: Samford
- NFL draft: 1967: 16th round, 398th overall pick

Career history
- Cincinnati Bengals (1968)
- Stats at Pro Football Reference

Rex George Keeling Jr. (September 9, 1943 – June 3, 2010) was an American football punter in the National Football League (NFL) who played for the Cincinnati Bengals. He played college football at Samford University.
