= WSYA =

WSYA may refer to:

- WMXS, a radio station (103.3 FM) licensed to Montgomery, Alabama, which held the call sign WSYA from 1987 to 1994
- WZKD, a radio station (950 AM) licensed to Montgomery, Alabama, which held the call sign WSYA from 1988 to 1995
- WFZX, a radio station (1490 AM) licensed to Anniston, Alabama, which held the call sign WSYA from 2008 to 2011
