= Jordan Veasy =

American football player (born 1995)

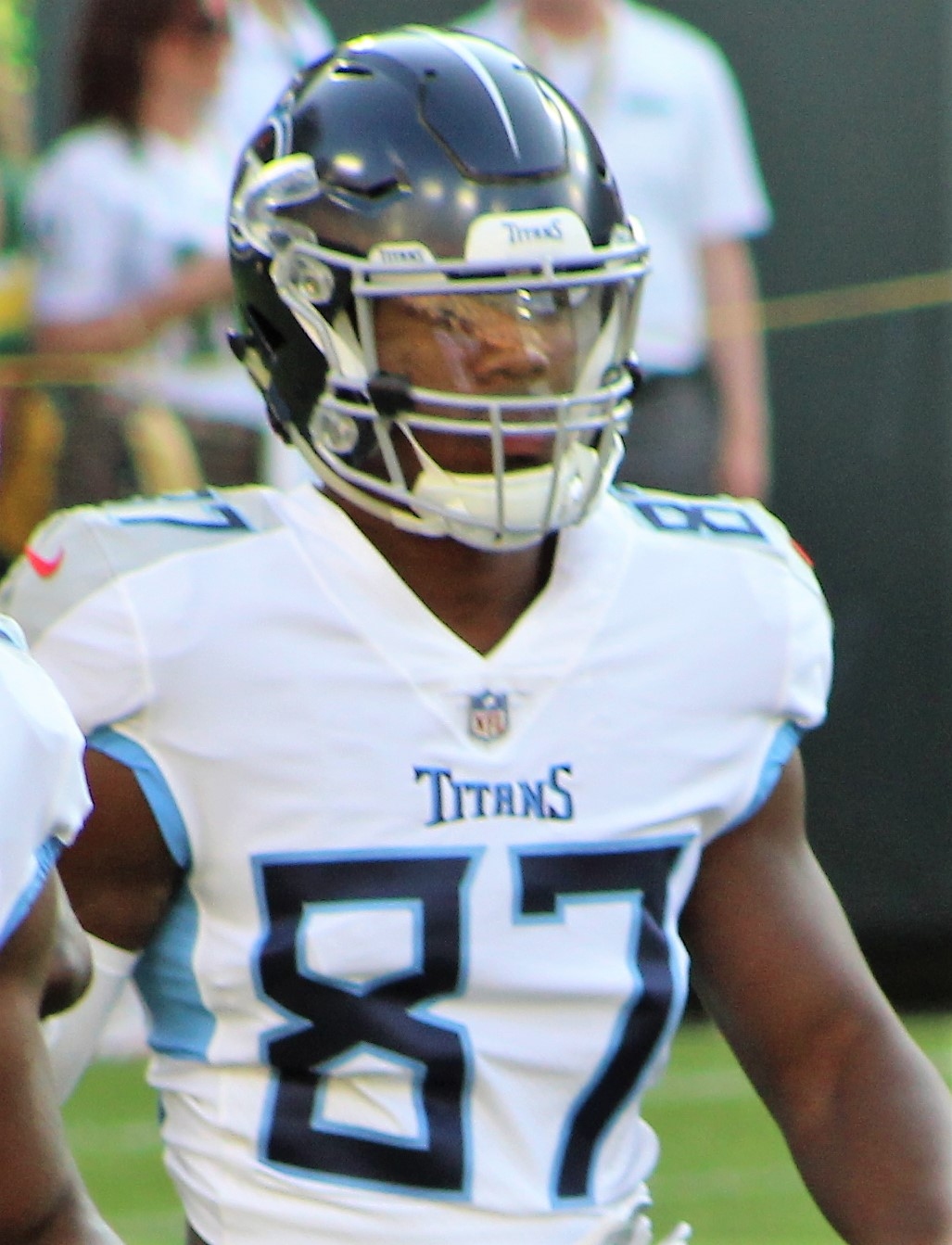
- Veasy with the Tennessee Titans in 2018

Profile
- Position: Wide receiver

Personal information
- Born: June 23, 1995 (age 31); Gadsden, Alabama, U.S.
- Listed height: 6 ft 3 in (1.91 m)
- Listed weight: 221 lb (100 kg)

Career information
- High school: Gadsden (AL) City
- College: Faulkner (2013); Itawamba (2014); Golden West (2015); California (2016-2017)
- NFL draft: 2018: undrafted

Career history
- Tennessee Titans (2018)*; Jacksonville Jaguars (2018)*; Indianapolis Colts (2019)*; Buffalo Bills (2019)*; Washington Redskins / Football Team (2019–2020); Houston Texans (2021); Las Vegas Raiders (2022)*; Seattle Sea Dragons (2023); San Antonio Brahmas (2024)*
- * Offseason or practice squad member only
- Stats at Pro Football Reference

Jordan Veasy (born June 23, 1995) is an American football wide receiver. He played college football at California and signed as an undrafted free agent with the Tennessee Titans in 2018. He has been a member of several other National Football League (NFL) teams.

== Early life and college ==
Veasy attended Gadsden City High School in Gadsden, Alabama. He initially played baseball as a shortstop until hitting a major growth spurt after his junior year. He then played football for the first time as a senior, catching 23 passes for 637 yards and 9 touchdowns in his lone season playing high school football. After graduating from high school in 2013, he enrolled in Faulkner University, a small private university in Montgomery, Alabama with an NAIA football program. He appeared in 6 games as a true freshman at Faulkner, recording 5 receptions for 75 yards and 3 touchdowns. After one year at Faulkner, Veasy transferred to Itawamba Community College, but did not play for their football team. He then transferred again to Golden West College in Huntington Beach, California. During his lone season at Golden West in 2015, Veasy played in 11 games, recording 63 receptions for 1,036 yards and 11 touchdowns.

A 3-star junior college wide receiver recruit entering the 2016 season, Veasy committed to California over offers from Eastern Michigan, Fresno State, Georgia State, Middle Tennessee State, South Alabama, and UAB, among others. As a junior in 2016, Veasy played in 12 games with 3 starts, catching 25 passes for 306 yards and 3 touchdowns. As a senior in 2017, Veasy played in 12 games with 10 starts, catching 38 passes for 491 yards and 6 touchdowns. In total, during his two seasons at Cal, Veasy played in 24 games with 13 starts, recording 63 receptions for 797 yards and 9 touchdowns.

== Professional career ==
=== Tennessee Titans ===
Veasy signed with the Tennessee Titans as an undrafted free agent on May 11, 2018, but was waived on September 1, 2018. The BC Lions traded for his CFL rights September 8, 2018.

=== Jacksonville Jaguars ===
On December 18, 2018, Veasy was signed to the Jacksonville Jaguars practice squad.

=== Indianapolis Colts ===
On January 14, 2019, Veasy signed a reserve/future contract with the Indianapolis Colts. He was on waived August 31, 2019.

=== Buffalo Bills ===
On September 25, 2019, Veasy was signed to the Buffalo Bills practice squad. He was released on October 1, but re-signed on October 14, only to be released three days later.

=== Washington Redskins / Football Team ===
On December 4, 2019, Veasy was signed to the Washington Redskins practice squad. Veasy partially attributed his signing to his taking part in a highly publicized workout with Colin Kaepernick on November 16. He was signed to a reserve/future contract on December 30, 2019. Veasy was placed on injured reserve on September 5, 2020, before being waived on October 6, 2020.

=== Houston Texans ===
On July 29, 2021, Veasy signed with the Houston Texans. He was released on August 31, 2021 and re-signed to the practice squad.

=== Las Vegas Raiders ===
On May 20, 2022, Veasy signed with the Las Vegas Raiders. He was released on August 10, 2022.

=== Seattle Sea Dragons ===
The Seattle Sea Dragons selected Veasy in the eighth round of the 2023 XFL Supplemental Draft on January 1, 2023.

=== San Antonio Brahmas ===
On August 9, 2023, Veasy was traded to the San Antonio Brahmas in exchange for safety Jack Koerner. He re-signed with the team on January 30, 2024. He was waived on March 22, 2024.
