= WKFX (disambiguation) =

WKFX is a radio station (99.1 FM) licensed to Rice Lake, Wisconsin.

WKFX may also refer to:

- WXZX, a radio station (105.7 FM) licensed to Hilliard, Ohio, which held the call sign WKFX in 1998
- WPCK, a radio station (104.9 FM) licensed to Denmark, Wisconsin, which held the call sign WKFX from 1990 to 1997
- WGAD, a radio station (930 AM) licensed to Rainbow City, Alabama, which held the call sign WKFX from 1981 to 1986
