= Jerry Watford =

American football player (1930–1993)

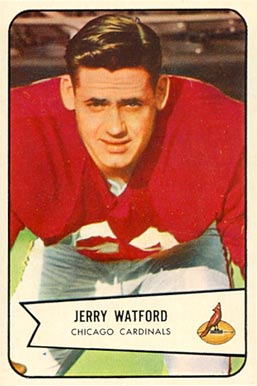
- Watford on a 1954 Bowman football card

No. 64
- Position: Offensive guard

Personal information
- Born: December 19, 1930; Gadsden, Alabama, U.S.
- Died: March 10, 1993 (aged 62); Blountville, Tennessee, U.S.
- Listed height: 6 ft 3 in (1.91 m)
- Listed weight: 205 lb (93 kg)

Career information
- High school: Gadsden
- College: Alabama (1949–1952)
- NFL draft: 1953: 8th round, 87th overall pick

Career history
- Chicago Cardinals (1953–1954)

Awards and highlights
- First-team All-SEC (1952)

Career NFL statistics
- Games played: 24
- Games started: 13
- Fumble recoveries: 2
- Stats at Pro Football Reference

Jerry Ray Watford (December 19, 1930 – March 10, 1993) was an American professional football offensive guard who played two seasons with the Chicago Cardinals of the National Football League (NFL). He was selected by the Cardinals in the eighth round of the 1953 NFL draft after playing college football at the University of Alabama.

== Early life and college ==
Jerry Ray Watford was born on December 19, 1930, in Gadsden, Alabama. He attended Gadsden High School in Gadsden.

Watford was a member of the Alabama Crimson Tide of the University of Alabama from 1949 to 1952 and a three-year letterman from 1950 to 1952. He converted from tackle to guard in spring 1950. He started 34 consecutive games for Alabama. Watford earned Associated Press first-team All-SEC honors and United Press third-team All-SEC honors his senior year in 1952. He was also a two-year letterman in baseball in college.

== Professional career ==
Watford was selected by the Chicago Cardinals in the eighth round, with the 88th overall pick, of the 1953 NFL draft. He played in all 12 games, starting six, for the Cardinals as an offensive guard during the 1953 season and recovered one fumble. He appeared in all 12 games, starting six, again in 1954, recovering one fumble. Watford became a free agent after the season.

== Personal life ==
Watford died on March 10, 1993, in Blountville, Tennessee.
