= WWGC =

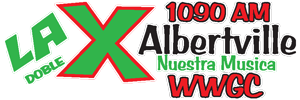
- Albertville, Alabama; United States
- Frequency: 1090 (kHz)
- Branding: La Doble X

Programming
- Format: Spanish Music

Ownership
- Owner: The Jeff Beck Broadcasting Group, LLC
- Sister stations: WTDR-FM, WFZX, WTDR, WGAD

History
- First air date: 1982
- Former call signs: WIUA, WXBK

Technical information
- Licensing authority: FCC
- Facility ID: 6211
- Class: D
- Power: 500 watts (day only)
- Transmitter coordinates: 34°15′52″N 86°16′44″W

Links
- Public license information: Public file; LMS
- Webcast: http://radio.securenetsystems.net/v5/WTDRAM

WWGC AM 1090 is a radio station licensed to serve Albertville, Alabama. The station is owned by The Jeff Beck Broadcasting Group, LLC. It airs a Latino Music programming format.

The station has been assigned the WWGC call letters by the Federal Communications Commission since April 24, 2002.
