= WFZX =

Radio station in Anniston, Alabama

- Anniston, Alabama; United States
- Broadcast area: Anniston-Oxford Metropolitan Area
- Frequency: 1490 kHz
- Branding: 99.1 & 99.3 The Vibe

Programming
- Format: Urban contemporary

Ownership
- Owner: Jeff Beck; (The Jeff Beck Broadcasting Group, LLC)
- Sister stations: WTDR-FM, WTDR, WGAD, WWGC

History
- First air date: August 4, 1954 (as WANA)
- Former call signs: WANA (1954–2008); WSYA (2008–2011); WGBZ (2011–2012)

Technical information
- Licensing authority: FCC
- Facility ID: 2311
- Class: C
- Power: 1,000 watts (unlimited)
- Transmitter coordinates: 33°41′15″N 85°49′49″W
- Translators: 99.1 W256BH (Oxford); 99.3 W257CT (Gadsden)

Links
- Public license information: Public file; LMS
- Webcast: Listen Live

WFZX (1490 AM) is a radio station broadcasting an urban contemporary music format. Licensed to Anniston, Alabama, United States, the station serves the Anniston-Oxford Metropolitan Area. The station is currently owned by Jeff Beck, through licensee The Jeff Beck Broadcasting Group, LLC. The station is branded as "99.1 & 99.3 The Vibe", referring to its two translators in Oxford and Gadsden.

== History ==
Owned by Cary L. Graham and Edwin Estes, the Anniston Radio Company opened WANA on August 4, 1954, taking over the 1490-kHz 250-watt FCC assignment previously used by Anniston station WOOB. Within a short time, Graham gained full ownership.

Joe A. Burney was an early employee of WANA, working his way up to become station manager. When Graham died, his will decreed that Bundy would receive the property. On August 4, 1987, the FCC approved the license to be transferred to Joe A. Burney and Ann H. Burney.

In June 2000, Anniston Radio Company reached an agreement to sell this station to Dewey D. Lankford for a reported sale price of $175,000. At the time of the sale, WANA broadcast a Southern Gospel music format. The deal was approved by the FCC on July 10, 2000, and the transaction was consummated on July 17, 2000.

In January 2006, Jacobs Broadcast Group Inc. reached an agreement to purchase WANA from Dewey D. Lankford. The station sold for a reported $330,000. At the time of the sale, WANA broadcast a mixed Urban Christian Contemporary/Gospel music format. The deal was approved by the FCC on March 3, 2006, and the transaction was consummated on May 1, 2006.

Under the new ownership, until May 2008 the station had been sports radio formatted WANA, known on-air as "Sports Radio 1490 The Ticket."

In May 2008, the station announced it would change its call letters to WSYA and that by the end of May it would be broadcasting a Soft Adult Contemporary music format, simulcast on an FM translator in Anniston. The station was assigned the WSYA call letters by the Federal Communications Commission on May 23, 2008. WSYA began broadcasting on 104.3 FM (Anniston, AL) and on 99.1 FM (Oxford, AL) on April 20, 2009. The station featured the syndicated The Bob and Sheri Show until early 2011; then, it began featuring the syndicated Rick and Bubba in the morning, as well as Delilah in the evening, until it changed formats. The station's call letters and branding were previously used by WMXS in Montgomery, Alabama, which used the WSYA call letters and was known as "Sunny 103" from 1987 to 1994.

The station changed call signs to WGBZ on April 6, 2011. The station again changed call signs on March 29, 2012 to WFZX.

On May 28, 2012 WFZX changed their format to classic hits, branded as "The Fox".

On September 5, 2012, WFZX, along with its sister station WTDR-FM, were sold to Jeff Beck, owner of The Jeff Beck Broadcasting Group, LLC. The sale of the two stations to Beck was consummated on January 3, 2013, at a purchase price of $745,000.

On September 3, 2017 WFZX changed their format from classic hits to urban contemporary, branded as "99.1 & 99.3 The Vibe". (info taken from stationintel.com)

== Translators ==
Broadcast translators for WFZX
Call sign	Frequency	City of license	FID	ERP (W)	Class	FCC info
W256BH	99.1 FM	Oxford, Alabama	139979	58	D	LMS
W257CT	99.3 FM	Gadsden, Alabama	142703	250	D	LMS
