= Aaron Pearson =

American football player (born 1964)

No. 96
- Position: Linebacker

Personal information
- Born: August 22, 1964 (age 62); Gadsden, Alabama, U.S.
- Listed height: 6 ft 0 in (1.83 m)
- Listed weight: 239 lb (108 kg)

Career information
- High school: Gadsden
- College: Mississippi State
- NFL draft: 1986: 11th round, 285th overall pick

Career history
- Kansas City Chiefs (1986–1988)

Awards and highlights
- Second-team All-SEC (1984)
- Stats at Pro Football Reference

Aaron Dantianto Pearson (born August 22, 1964) is an American former professional football linebacker who played three seasons with the Kansas City Chiefs of the National Football League (NFL). He was selected by the Chiefs in the eleventh round of the 1986 NFL draft. He played college football at Itawamba Junior College and Mississippi State University.

== Early life and college ==
Aaron Dantianto Pearson was born August 22, 1964, in Gadsden, Alabama. He attended Gadsden High School.

Pearson first played college football at Itawamba Junior College from 1982 to 1983. He then transferred to Mississippi State University, where he was a two-year letterman for the Mississippi State Bulldogs from 1984 to 1985. He was named second-team All-SEC by the Associated Press in 1984.

== Professional career ==
Pearson was selected by the Kansas City Chiefs in the 11th round, with the 285th overall pick, of the 1986 NFL draft. He officially signed with the team on July 23. He played in 15 games for the Chiefs during his rookie year in 1986. He also appeared in one playoff game. Pearson appeared in 12 games, starting nine, during the strike-shortened 1987 season. He played in all 16 games, starting ten, in 1988. He became a free agent after the 1988 season and re-signed with the Chiefs. He was released on July 23, 1989.

== Personal life ==
In May 1992, Pearson was shot in a dispute after breaking a car's windshield with his fists.
