= WGAD =

- Rainbow City, Alabama; United States
- Broadcast area: Gadsden, Alabama
- Frequency: 930 kHz
- Branding: AM 930 FM 103.9 WGAD

Programming
- Format: Oldies

Ownership
- Owner: Jeff Beck; (The Jeff Beck Broadcasting Group, LLC)
- Sister stations: WTDR-FM, WFZX, WTDR, WWGC

History
- First air date: 1951 (as WETO)
- Former call signs: WETO (1951–1963); WJBY (1963–1981); WKFX (1981–1986); WJBY (1986–2007); WGAD (2007–2011); WJBY (2011–2012)

Technical information
- Licensing authority: FCC
- Facility ID: 22995
- Class: B
- Power: 5,000 watts (day); 500 watts (night)
- Transmitter coordinates: 33°59′08″N 86°02′15″W
- Translator: 103.9 W280ER (Anniston)

Links
- Public license information: Public file; LMS
- Webcast: Listen Live

WGAD (930 AM) is a radio station licensed to serve Rainbow City, Alabama, United States. It operates at 930 kilohertz, with a daytime power of 5,000 watts non-directional, and 500 watts directional at night. Established in 1951, the station is currently owned by Jeff Beck and the broadcast license is held by Gadsden Radio Media, LLC.

== Programming ==
WGAD broadcasts an oldies format to the greater Gadsden, Alabama, area. Weekend programming features special shows from Scott Shannon, Dick Bartley, and Gadsden's own Bob Mayben. July 2007 when the station changed formats, they launched a live and local morning show. The show maintained the same host but changed co-hosts several times before the show was taken off the air in November 2008.

== History ==
The 930 frequency came to Gadsden when local druggist "Doc" Cary Graham put WETO on the air in 1950. WETO operated with 1,000 watts daytime only. In 1963 Gadsden radio veteran Charlie "B" Boman bought the station from Mr. Graham, and began a series of upgrades, both to the station and its image. From its original location in the rear of "Doc's" drug store, Boman moved to the Life of Alabama Insurance building on the main street of town, and installed all new equipment. Boman had begun his radio career at the original WJBY, and found those call letters to be available, so the heritage call returned to the air at the 930 spot on the dial, late in 1963. Boman also raised the power to 5,000 watts, while still a daytime station. In the early to middle seventies, the station enjoyed popularity as a contemporary music station under Program Director Bob Mayben, who patterned the presentation after pop stations in large markets. In the late 1970s Boman sold WJBY to Hinton Mitchem and Gordon Henderson, who added the night time signal and erected four new towers.

In 2011, the station was sold to Jeff Beck.

== Frequency swap ==
On October 4, 2007, the WJBY call sign was moved from 930 AM to 1350 AM while sister station WGAD in Gadsden had its call sign moved from 1350 AM to 930 AM. In October 2010, the stations began the process to regain their original (prior to 2007) call letters. The station on 930 AM went dark on October 10, 2010, and regained the "WJBY" call sign on January 19, 2011. WJBY resumed normal broadcast operations on September 12, 2011. On September 20, 2012, the station changed its call sign back to WGAD.

On August 30, 2013 WGAD changed their format to adult hits, and in 2015 moved to a broad oldies format.
