= Gilliland-Reese Covered Bridge =

Gilliland-Reese CB
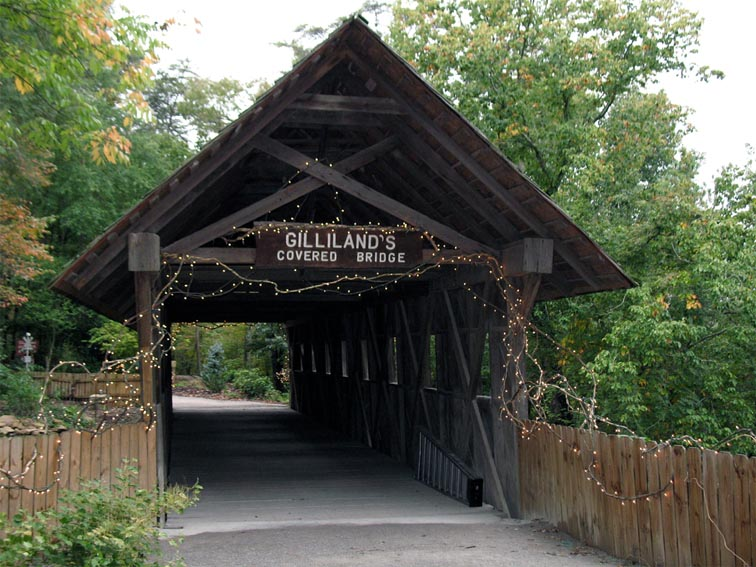
- The Gilliland-Reese Covered Bridge at Noccalula Falls Park in Gadsden, Alabama.
- Coordinates: 34°02′21.79″N 86°01′26.93″W
- Carries: pedestrian traffic
- Crosses: small pond near Black Creek
- Locale: Gadsden, Alabama
- Maintained by: City of Gadsden
- ID number: 01-28-C (WGCB)

Characteristics
- Design: Stringer construction
- Total length: 85 ft (26 m)

History
- Construction end: 1899

Location
- Interactive map of Gilliland-Reese CB

The Gilliland-Reese Covered Bridge, more simply known as Gilliland's Covered Bridge, is a locally owned wooden covered bridge that spans a small pond near Black Creek in Etowah County, Alabama, United States. It is located at Noccalula Falls Park off Noccalula Road (State Route 211) in the city of Gadsden. Coordinates are 34°02′21.79″N 86°01′26.93″W (34.039386, -86.024147). Noccalula Falls Park is also home to the 90-foot (27 m) Noccalula Falls, part of Black Creek as it cascades down into a ravine from a ledge off Lookout Mountain. There are a couple of sources which state the bridge spans Clayton Fish Pond, but that is over a mile (2 kilometers) west of the park along a rural section of Hinds Road.

Built in 1899, the 85-foot (26 m) bridge is a Stringer construction over a single span. Its current WGCB number is 01-28-C, formerly 01-28-02. Although most sources spell the second part of the name as "Reese," it is actually named after the town of Reece City where the bridge was originally located. There is an admission charge to visit Noccalula Falls Park (Noccalula Falls itself is excluded), which also includes a pioneer village along with a botanical garden. The bridge is maintained by the City of Gadsden.

== History ==
The Gilliland-Reese Covered Bridge was constructed in 1899 by a crew under the direction of Etowah County Commissioner Jesse Gilliland...a Town Lattice truss made of rough-hewn lumber and covered with weathered shingles, originally located over Little Wills Creek at Gilliland Plantation in the vicinity of present-day Bethany Sitz Gap Road near Reece City (Coordinates 34°04′17.66″N 86°01′50.67″W (34.071572, -86.030742)). The bridge provided a crossing over the creek, thus improving area transportation, and also was a favorite meeting place. Eventually, the Gilliland-Reese Covered Bridge was replaced in the 1920s by the new Reeceville Road. In 1966, the bridge was donated to the City of Gadsden by the family of Judge H. Ross Gilliland as it was threatened by the construction of Interstate 59. No other structures of the Gilliland Plantation are known to remain. The bridge was fully restored and moved to Noccalula Falls Park in 1967. Most of the Town Lattice truss setup was removed during restoration, making the bridge more of a Stringer construction. Therefore, it is currently classified as a non-authentic covered bridge. Another piece of history has been added to an already historic setting.

== See also ==
- List of Alabama covered bridges
