= Dre Kirkpatrick =

American football player (born 1989)

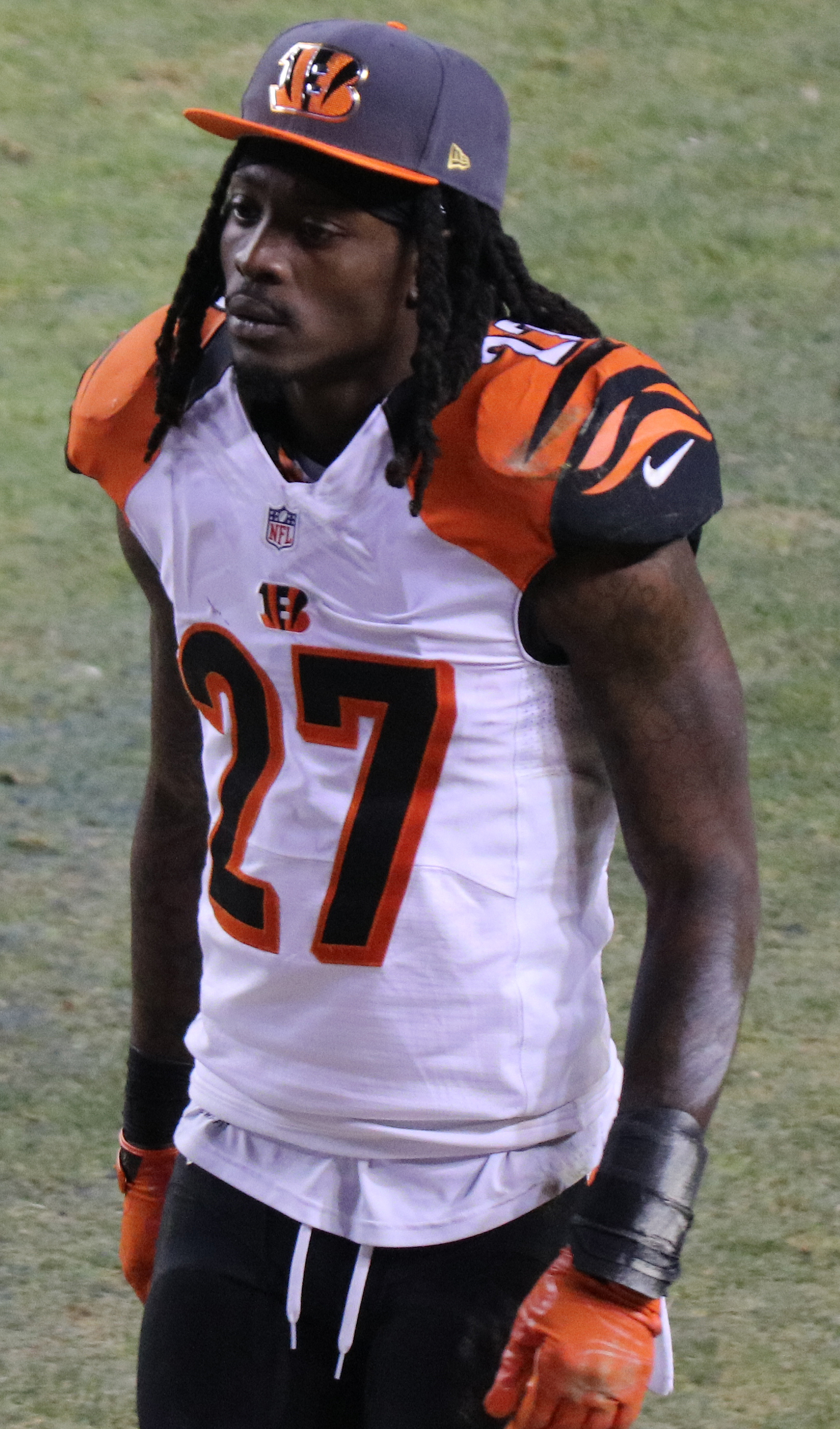
- Kirkpatrick with the Cincinnati Bengals in 2015

No. 27, 20, 13
- Position: Cornerback

Personal information
- Born: October 26, 1989 (age 37); Gadsden, Alabama, U.S.
- Listed height: 6 ft 2 in (1.88 m)
- Listed weight: 190 lb (86 kg)

Career information
- High school: Gadsden City
- College: Alabama (2009–2011)
- NFL draft: 2012: 1st round, 17th overall pick

Career history
- Cincinnati Bengals (2012–2019); Arizona Cardinals (2020); San Francisco 49ers (2021)

Awards and highlights
- 2× BCS national champion (2009, 2011); First-team All-American (2011); 2× Second-team All-SEC (2010, 2011)

Career NFL statistics
- Total tackles: 365
- Sacks: 3.0
- Forced fumbles: 1
- Fumble recoveries: 3
- Interceptions: 13
- Defensive touchdowns: 2
- Stats at Pro Football Reference

D'Andre Lawan "Dre" Kirkpatrick (born October 26, 1989) is an American former professional football player who was a cornerback in the National Football League (NFL) for 10 seasons. He played college football for the Alabama Crimson Tide and was selected by the Cincinnati Bengals in the first round of the 2012 NFL draft. He also played for the Arizona Cardinals and San Francisco 49ers.

== Early life ==
Kirkpatrick attended Gadsden City High School located in Gadsden, Alabama where he played for the Gadsden City Titans high school football team. He was a teammate of fellow Crimson Tide players Jerrell Harris and Kendall Kelly. He completed his senior football season in the fall of 2008. Kirkpatrick participated in the 2009 U.S. Army All-American Bowl and the 2008 Alabama Mississippi All-Star Football Classic, where he was recorded at 6 ft 2 in and 180 lbs.

Kirkpatrick played his final three high school seasons at Gadsden City (35 games) and finished his career with 193 tackles, 17 interceptions, three returned for a touchdown, 36 pass breakups, two sacks, one punt return touchdown, one kick return touchdown, and one receiving touchdown. After completion of his senior season he was awarded as the ASWA 6A back of the year as well as a first-team all-state defensive back for the second consecutive year.

Entering February 2009, Kirkpatrick was one of the most highly rated and sought after high school football recruits in the country, having been awarded a five-star rating by national recruiting outlets Rivals.com and Scout.com.

On February 7, 2009, Kirkpatrick ended months of recruiting, committing to the Alabama Crimson Tide on National Signing Day, as he announced his decision live on ESPNU.

== Professional career ==
=== Pre-draft ===
Coming out of Alabama, Kirkpatrick was projected to be a first round pick by NFL draft experts and scouts. He received an invitation to the NFL combine and opted to skip the bench press, short shuttle, and three-cone drill due to a shoulder injury and after injuring his hamstring during the combine. On March 7, 2012, Kirkpatrick participated at Alabama's pro day and performed the three-cone and positional drills for the team representatives and scouts from all 32 NFL teams. He was ranked the third best cornerback prospect in the draft by NFLDraftScout.com and NFL analyst Mike Mayock.

External videos
- Dre Kirkpatrick's NFL Combine Workout
- Dre Kirkpatrick's 40-yard dash

Pre-draft measurables
Height	Weight	Arm length	Hand span	Wingspan	40-yard dash	10-yard split	20-yard split	Three-cone drill	Vertical jump	Broad jump
6 ft 1 5/8 in (1.87 m)	186 lb (84 kg)	30 5/8 in (0.78 m)	9 1/2 in (0.24 m)	6 ft 3 in (1.91 m)	4.51 s	1.56 s	2.72 s	7.20 s	35 in (0.89 m)	10 ft 0 in (3.05 m)
All values from NFL Combine/Alabama's Pro Day

=== Cincinnati Bengals ===
==== 2012 ====
The Cincinnati Bengals selected Kirkpatrick in the first round (17th overall, traded from Oakland in exchange for Carson Palmer) of the 2012 NFL draft. He was the third cornerback drafted in the 2012 NFL draft, behind Morris Claiborne (6th overall, Cowboys) and Stephon Gilmore (10th overall, Bills).

External videos
- Bengals draft Dre Kirkpatrick 17th overall
- Pre-Draft Interview: Dre Kirkpatrick

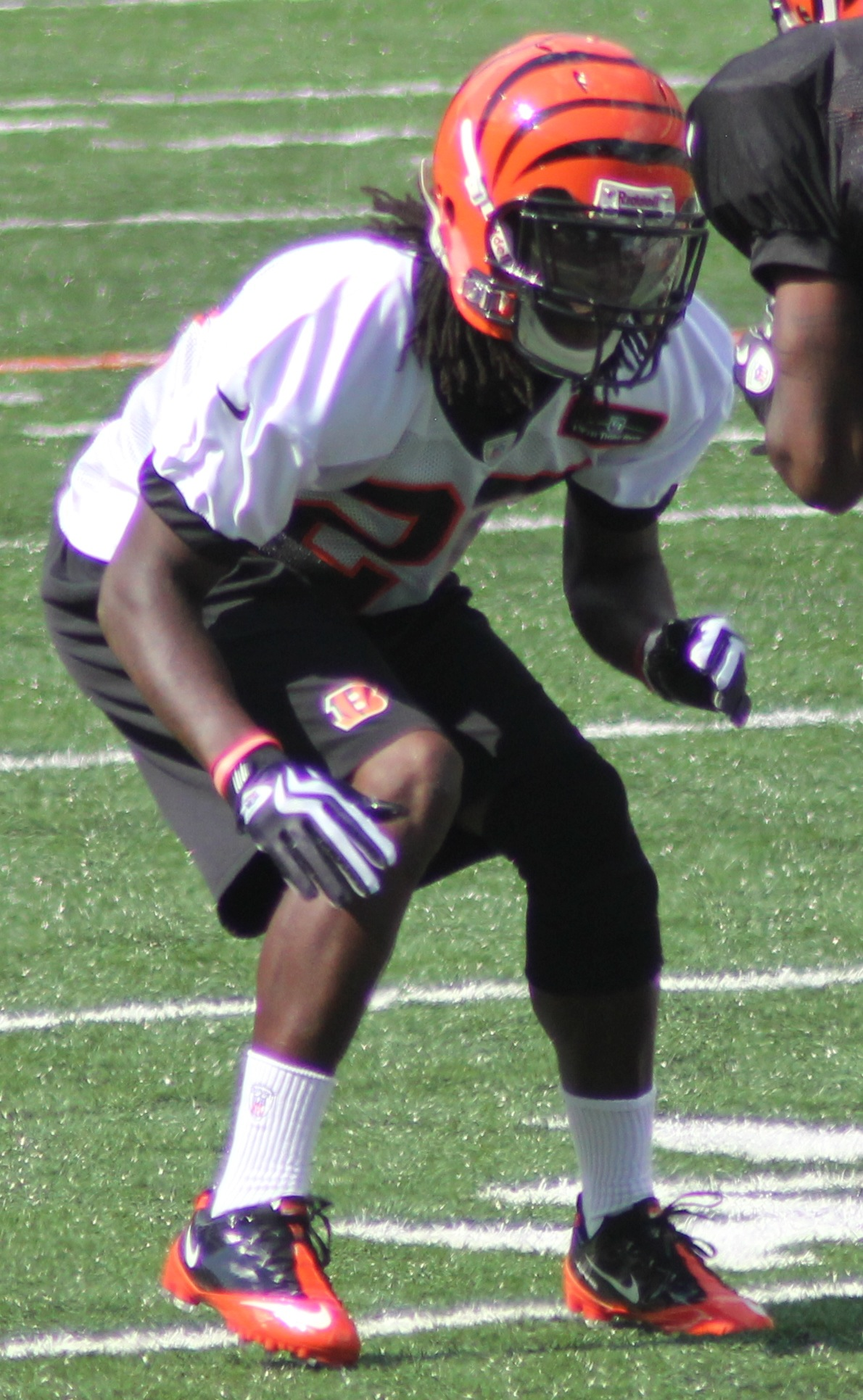
Kirkpatrick at training camp in 2012

On May 18, 2012, the Bengals signed Kirkpatrick to a four-year $8.62 million contract that includes $7.84 million guaranteed and a signing bonus of $4.71 million.

Kirkpatrick joined a veteran core of cornerbacks that included six highly touted first round picks. While preparing for training camp, Kirkpatrick fractured his knee and was expected to miss the next six weeks and be sidelined during training camp. His knee recovered in August before the Cincinnati Bengals played their last preseason game. Kirkpatrick returned to practice, but developed tendinitis in his knee that later delayed his debut. Head coach Marvin Lewis named Kirkpatrick the sixth cornerback on the Bengals' depth chart to begin the season, behind Nate Clements, Leon Hall, Terence Newman, Jason Allen, and Adam Jones.

He was inactive for the first seven games and made his professional regular season debut on November 4, 2012, recording one tackle during the 23–31 loss to the Denver Broncos. In Week 11, Kirkpatrick recorded a season-high two combined tackles in the Bengals' 28–6 defeat over the Kansas City Chiefs. The next week, he made a tackle in a 34–10 victory over the Oakland Raiders, but suffered a concussion and was unable to finish the game. Kirkpatrick missed the following four games and was inactive for the rest of his rookie season. He finished the 2012 season with four combined tackles and was limited to five games.

==== 2013 ====
Kirkpatrick entered training camp in 2013 and competed for the starting cornerback role with Terence Newman, Leon Hall, and Adam "Pacman" Jones. He was named the fourth cornerback on the depth chart behind Newman, Hall, and Jones.

On November 17, 2013, he collected two combined tackles and made his first career sack on Jason Campbell in a 41–20 victory over the Cleveland Browns. On December 1, 2013, Kirkpatrick made his first career interception after he picked off a pass attempt by San Diego Chargers' quarterback Philip Rivers during a 14–10 victory. The following week against the Indianapolis Colts, Kirkpatrick recorded a season-high six solo tackles in the Bengals' 42–28 victory. On December 15, 2013, he made his first career start in place of Terence Newman who was out with an MCL injury and finished the 20–30 loss to the Pittsburgh Steelers with four combined tackles.

On December 21, 2013, Kirkpatrick had his best game yet when he collected a season-high nine combined tackles, three pass deflections, and intercepted two passes From Baltimore Ravens' quarterback Joe Flacco, as the Bengals won 34–17. He made his second interception during the fourth quarter and returned it for a 21-yard touchdown, marking the first touchdown of his career.

He finished the season with 30 combined tackles (23 solo), five pass deflections, three interceptions, a sack, and a touchdown in 14 games and three starts. The Cincinnati Bengals received a playoff berth after finishing first in the AFC North with an 11–5 record. On January 5, 2014, Kirkpatrick started his first career playoff games and made two solo tackles during the Bengals' 10–27 AFC Wildcard loss to the San Diego Chargers.

==== 2014 ====
Throughout the Cincinnati Bengals' training camp in 2014, Kirkpatrick competed for the job as the starting cornerback against Adam Jones, Terence Newman, Leon Hall, and rookie Darqueze Dennard. He was named the fourth cornerback to start the season, behind Hall, Newman, and Jones.

In Week 10, he collected a season-high four combined tackles in the Bengals' 3–24 loss to the Cleveland Browns. On December 14, 2014, Kirkpatrick made his first start of the season and deflected a pass and intercepted a pass attempt by Brian Hoyer during the 30–0 victory at the Cleveland Browns. The following week, Kirkpatrick made three solo tackles, two pass deflections, and intercepted two passes from Peyton Manning, as the Bengals' defeated the Denver Boncos 37–28. He returned the first interception for a 30-yard touchdown and sealed the game with his second interception in the final minutes.

He finished the season with 23 combined tackles (20 solo), seven pass deflections, three interceptions, and a touchdown in two starts and 16 games. The Cincinnati Bengals earned a playoff berth after finishing second atop the AFC North with a 10-5-1 record. On January 4, 2015, Kirkpatrick started in the AFC Wildcard game against the Indianapolis Colts and made four combined tackles and defended a pass during their 10–26 loss.

==== 2015 ====
On April 28, 2015, the Cincinnati Bengals opted to exercise the fifth-year option on Kirkpatrick's rookie contract, paying him a salary of $7.5 million in 2016.

Kirkpatrick entered Cincinnati Bengals' training camp and competed against Adam Jones, Leon Hall, Darquese Dennard, and Josh Shaw for the vacant starting cornerback job left by the departure of Terence Newman. Head coach Marvin Lewis named Kirkpatrick the starting cornerback, along with Adam "Pacman" Jones, to begin the 2015 season.

During a Week 12 contest against the St. Louis Rams, Kirkpatrick collected a season-high ten combined tackles and defended three passes in their 31–7 victory. On December 28, 2015, he earned seven solo tackles and deflected a pass in a 17–20 loss at the Denver Broncos. He finished the 2015 season with a career-high 70 combined tackles (63 solo) and a career-high 16 pass deflections in 15 starts and 16 games.

==== 2016 ====
Kirkpatrick began the season as the starting cornerback with Adam Jones after winning the job over Darqueze Dennard and William Jackson III.

On September 18, 2016, he recorded two combined tackles, defended two passes, and intercepted a pass attempt from Ben Roethlisberger during a 16–24 loss to the Pittsburgh Steelers. In Week 8, Kirkpatrick recorded a season-high six solo tackles in a 27–27 tie against the Washington Redskins. On November 14, 2016, Kirkpatrick made five combined tackles, deflected a pass, and intercepted a pass By New York Giants' quarterback Eli Manning, as the Bengals lost 20–21. The next game, he collected two combined tackles, deflected a pass, and intercepted a pass from Tyrod Taylor in the Bengals' 12–16 loss to the Buffalo Bills. He finished the 2016 season with 46 combined tackles (35 solo), ten passes defensed, and three interceptions in 15 games and 14 starts.

==== 2017 ====
On March 9, 2017, the Cincinnati Bengals signed Kirkpatrick to a five-year, $52.5 million contract extension that includes $12 million guaranteed and a signing bonus of $7 million.

Kirkpatrick was named the starting cornerback, along with Adam "Pacman" Jones, for his second consecutive season after beating out Darqueze Dennard, Josh Shaw, and William Jackson III.

On October 29, 2017, Kirkpatrick recorded three solo tackles, defended a pass, and sacked Indianapolis Colts' quarterback Jacoby Brissett in a 24–23 victory. The following week, he made a season-high six solo tackles during a 23–7 loss to the Jacksonville Jaguars. In Week 11, Kirkpatrick intercepted Denver's Brock Osweiler in the end zone and returned it 101 yards, before mishandling and fumbling the ball and recovering it at the one-yard line. Kirkpatrick sustained a concussion during the Bengals' Week 13 loss to the Pittsburgh Steelers and was sidelined for the next two games (Weeks 14–15). Kirkpatrick finished the 2017 season with 55 combined tackles (47 solo), a career-high 14 pass deflections, an interception, and a sack in 14 games and 14 starts. He received an overall grade of 56.4, which ranked 91st among all qualified cornerbacks in 2017.

==== 2018 ====
In 2018, Kirkpatrick started 13 games, recording 41 tackles, nine passes defensed and no interceptions. He was placed on injured reserve on December 28, 2018, with a shoulder injury.

==== 2019 ====
On November 15, 2019, Kirkpatrick was placed on injured reserve after hyper-extending his knee back in Week 6. He finished the season starting six games, recording 33 tackles, four passes defensed, and a sack.

Kirkpatrick was released by the Bengals on March 31, 2020, after eight seasons.

=== Arizona Cardinals ===
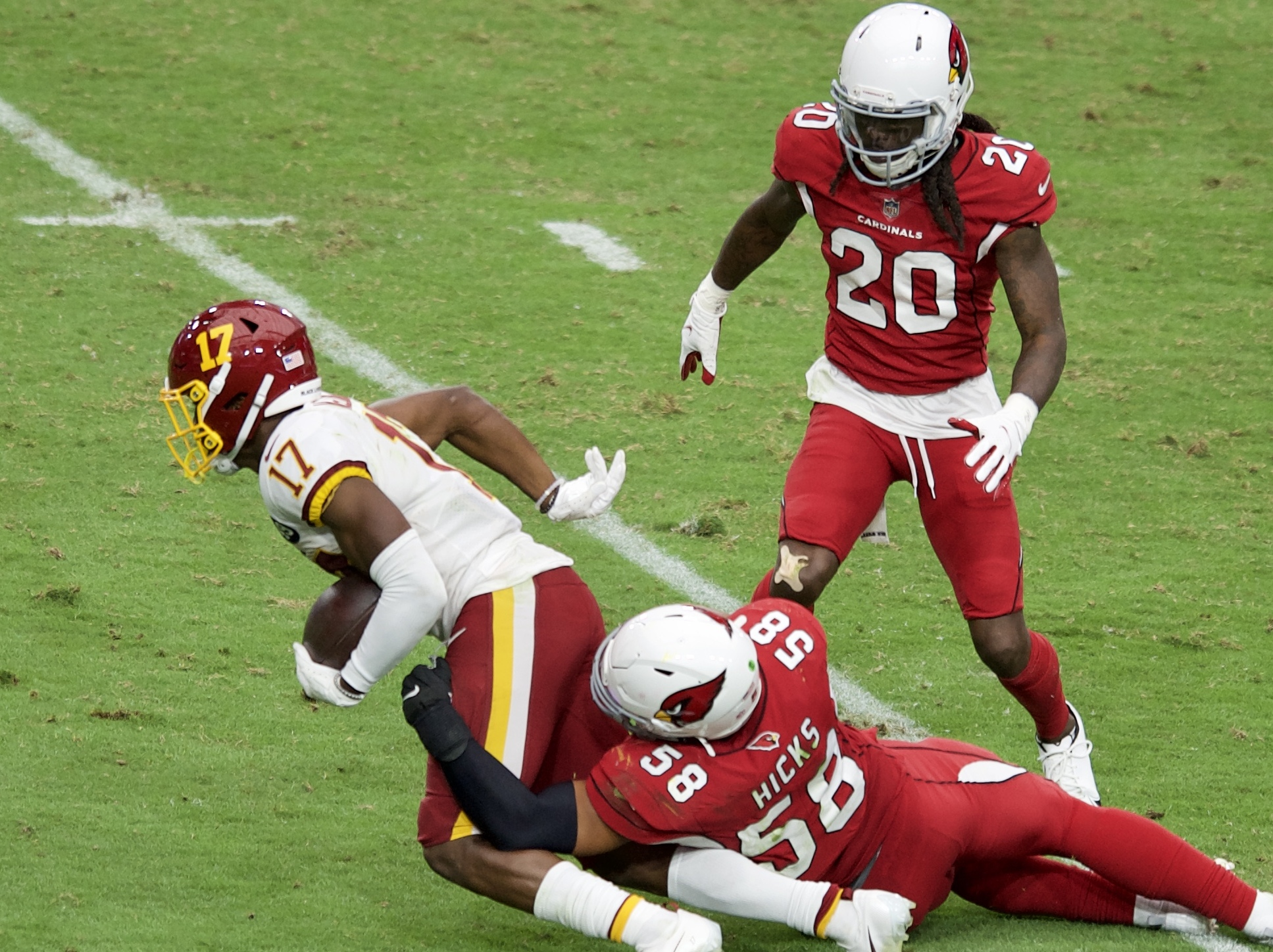
Kirkpatrick (#20) playing for the Cardinals in 2020.

Kirkpatrick visited the Arizona Cardinals on August 21, 2020, and signed with the team two days later.

In Week 6 against the Dallas Cowboys, Kirkpatrick intercepted a pass thrown by former Bengals teammate Andy Dalton during the 38–10 win. This was Kirkpatrick's first interception as a Cardinal. In Week 10 against the Buffalo Bills, Kirkpatrick intercepted a pass thrown by Josh Allen during the 32–30 win which would later be referred to as Hail Murray. He finished the season playing in 14 games with 11 starts, recording 56 tackles, three interceptions (tied for first on the team), and seven passes defensed (second on the team).

=== San Francisco 49ers ===
On September 14, 2021, Kirkpatrick signed with the San Francisco 49ers. He was released on November 16.

== NFL career statistics ==
Legend
**Bold**	Career high

=== Regular season ===
Year	Team	Games		Tackles					Interceptions					Fumbles			
Year	Team	GP	GS	Cmb	Solo	Ast	Sck	TFL	Int	Yds	TD	Lng	PD	FF	FR	Yds	TD
2012	CIN	5	0	4	4	0	0.0	0	0	0	0	0	0	0	0	0	0
2013	CIN	14	3	30	23	7	**1.0**	1	**3**	21	**1**	21	5	0	**1**	9	0
2014	CIN	**16**	2	23	20	3	0.0	0	**3**	32	**1**	30	7	0	0	0	0
2015	CIN	**16**	**15**	**70**	**63**	7	0.0	0	0	0	0	0	**16**	0	0	0	0
2016	CIN	15	14	46	35	**11**	0.0	0	**3**	21	0	21	10	0	0	0	0
2017	CIN	14	14	55	47	8	**1.0**	**4**	1	**101**	0	**101**	14	**1**	**1**	0	0
2018	CIN	13	13	41	35	6	0.0	2	0	0	0	0	9	0	0	0	0
2019	CIN	6	6	33	27	6	**1.0**	2	0	0	0	0	4	0	**1**	**11**	0
2020	ARI	14	11	56	53	3	0.0	0	**3**	13	0	13	7	0	0	0	0
2021	SFO	6	1	7	6	1	0.0	1	0	0	0	0	0	0	0	0	0
		119	79	365	313	52	3.0	10	13	188	2	101	72	1	3	20	0

=== Playoffs ===
Year	Team	Games		Tackles					Interceptions					Fumbles			
Year	Team	GP	GS	Cmb	Solo	Ast	Sck	TFL	Int	Yds	TD	Lng	PD	FF	FR	Yds	TD
2013	CIN	**1**	**1**	2	2	0	0.0	0	0	0	0	0	0	0	0	0	0
2014	CIN	**1**	**1**	**4**	**3**	**1**	0.0	0	0	0	0	0	**1**	0	0	0	0
2015	CIN	**1**	**1**	3	2	**1**	0.0	0	0	0	0	0	0	0	0	0	0
		3	3	9	7	2	0.0	0	0	0	0	0	1	0	0	0	0

== Personal life ==
Kirkpatrick's son, Dre Kirkpatrick Jr, attended Gadsden City High School, the same high school as his father, and was a defensive back at the University of Alabama. On November 1, 2025, Kirkpatrick Jr. was arrested and charged with three counts of reckless endangerment, one count of attempting to elude, and speeding, before being released from jail after posting a $1,500 bond. The incident was also under investigation by the University of Alabama. On October 28, 2026, Kirkpatrick Jr. was dismissed from the team.

Kirkpatrick has four children in total.

Kirkpatrick is the cousin of Jacksonville Jaguars cornerback Caleb Ransaw.
