= Darnell Mooney =

American football player (born 1997)

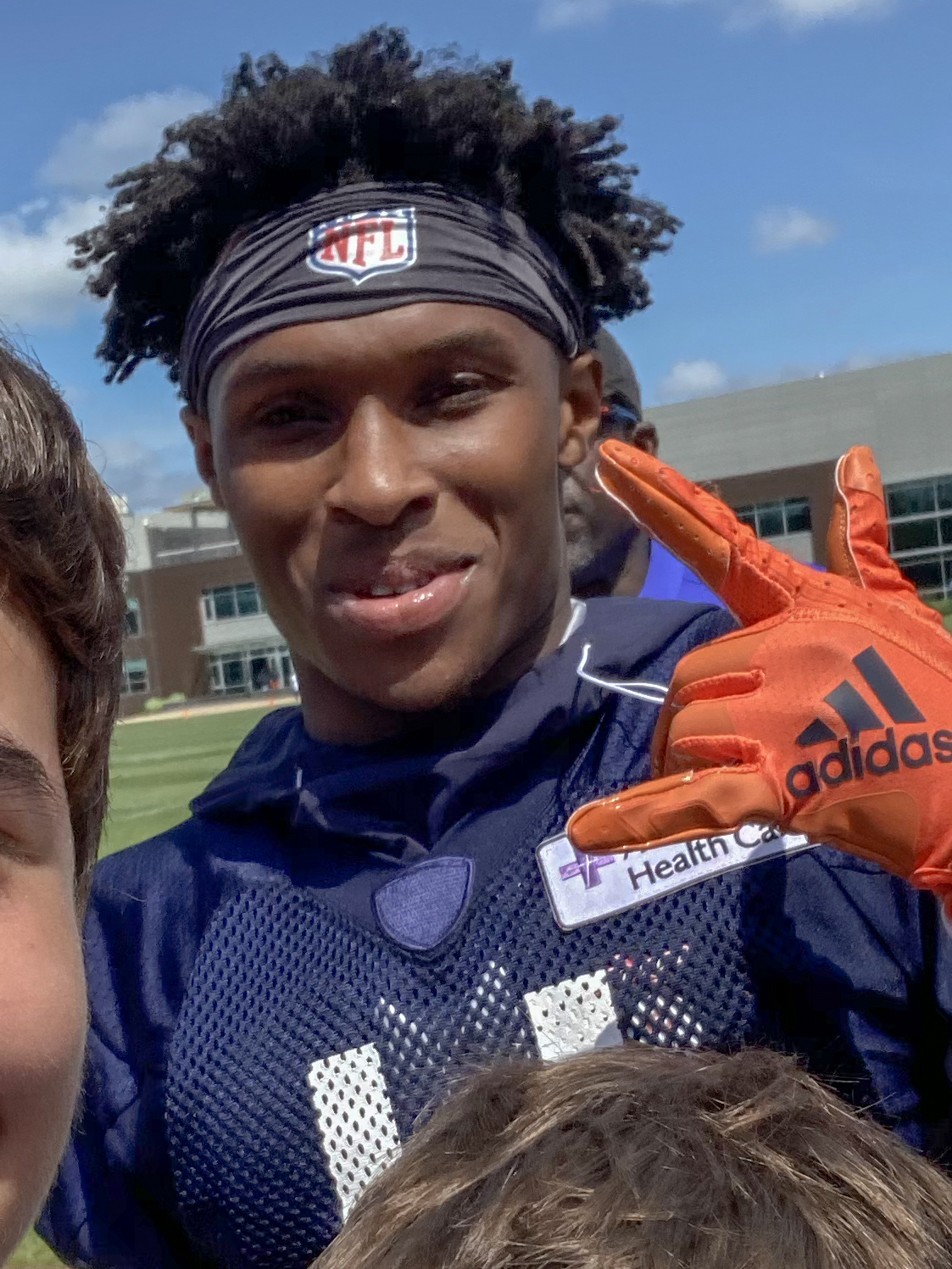
- Mooney with the Chicago Bears in 2021

No. 17 – New York Giants
- Position: Wide receiver
- Roster status: Active

Personal information
- Born: October 29, 1997 (age 29); Gadsden, Alabama, U.S.
- Listed height: 5 ft 11 in (1.80 m)
- Listed weight: 177 lb (80 kg)

Career information
- High school: Gadsden City
- College: Tulane (2016–2019)
- NFL draft: 2020: 5th round, 173rd overall pick

Career history
- Chicago Bears (2020–2023); Atlanta Falcons (2024–2025); New York Giants (2026–present)

Career NFL statistics as of Week 10, 2026
- Receptions: 323
- Receiving yards: 4,203
- Receiving touchdowns: 17
- Stats at Pro Football Reference

Darnell Mooney (born October 29, 1997) is an American professional football wide receiver for the New York Giants of the National Football League (NFL). He played college football for the Tulane Green Wave and was selected by the Chicago Bears in the fifth round of the 2020 NFL draft.

== Early life ==
Mooney went to Gadsden City High School in Gadsden, Alabama. Mooney played football and basketball for the Gadsden City Titans.

== College career ==
At Tulane, Mooney led the Green Wave in receiving in both his junior and senior seasons. He caught 48 passes each year, totaling 993 yards in 2018 and 713 yards in 2019. Mooney scored 19 touchdowns in his college career. At the NFL draft combine, Mooney ran a 40-yard dash time of 4.38 seconds.

== Professional career ==
Pre-draft measurables
Height	Weight	Arm length	Hand span	Wingspan	40-yard dash	10-yard split	20-yard split	Vertical jump	Broad jump	Bench press
5 ft 10 1/8 in (1.78 m)	176 lb (80 kg)	30 7/8 in (0.78 m)	9 5/8 in (0.24 m)	6 ft 2 in (1.88 m)	4.38 s	1.54 s	2.55 s	37.0 in (0.94 m)	10 ft 4 in (3.15 m)	9 reps
All values from NFL Combine

=== Chicago Bears ===
Mooney was selected by the Chicago Bears with the 173rd pick in the fifth round of the 2020 NFL draft. He signed a four-year rookie contract with the team on July 21.

In his NFL debut, a 27–23 victory over the Detroit Lions, Mooney caught three passes from Mitchell Trubisky for 38 yards. He scored his first touchdown the following week when he caught a 15-yard pass against the New York Giants. In Week 15 against the Minnesota Vikings, Mooney caught four passes and a touchdown; the former elevated his season reception total to 46, enabling him to set the Bears franchise record for the most catches by a rookie, passing Harlon Hill's 45 in 1954. Week 17 against the rival Packers, Mooney had his best game of his rookie season, catching 11 passes for 93 yards. Mooney sustained an ankle injury near the end of the Packers game, which forced him to miss the Bears' playoff game against the New Orleans Saints.

For the 2021 season, Mooney caught 81 passes for 1,055 yards and four touchdowns. His best performance came in the last game, which came against the Vikings, where Mooney caught 12 passes for 126 yards.

In 2022, Mooney started the first 12 games before suffering an ankle injury in Week 12. He was placed on injured reserve on November 29, 2022. He finished with 40 receptions for 493 yards and two touchdowns.

Mooney finished the 2023 Chicago Bears season with career lows of 31 receptions, 414 yards, one touchdown. His best performance came in a Week 8 game against the New Orleans Saints, where he caught 5 passes for 82 yards. Mooney sustained a concussion in Week 15 and missed the final two games of the season. Mooney, a pending free agent, expressed interest in returning to Chicago, commenting, "I want to be here. I love Chicago. I love being here."

=== Atlanta Falcons ===
On March 15, 2024, Mooney signed a three-year, $39 million contract with the Atlanta Falcons. In Week 5 against the Tampa Bay Buccaneers on Thursday Night Football, Mooney caught 9-of-16 targets for 105 yards and two touchdowns, marking the first multi-touchdown game of his career.

On March 9, 2026, Mooney was released by the Falcons.

=== New York Giants ===
On March 17, 2026, Mooney signed a one-year, $10 million contract with the New York Giants.

== NFL career statistics ==
Legend
**Bold**	Career high

Year	Team	Games		Receiving					Rushing					Fumbles	
Year	Team	GP	GS	Rec	Yds	Avg	Lng	TD	Att	Yds	Avg	Lng	TD	Fum	Lost
2020	CHI	16	9	61	631	10.3	53	4	4	20	5.0	**16**	0	1	0
2021	CHI	**17**	14	**81**	**1,055**	13.0	**64**	4	**6**	**32**	**5.3**	15	**1**	0	0
2022	CHI	12	12	40	493	12.3	56	2	1	2	2.0	2	0	0	0
2023	CHI	15	14	31	414	13.4	41	1	2	5	2.5	3	0	0	0
2024	ATL	16	**16**	64	992	**15.5**	49	**5**	0	0	0.0	0	0	0	0
2025	ATL	15	15	32	443	13.8	49	1	0	0	0.0	0	0	**2**	0
2026	NYG	9	2	14	175	12.5	33	0	4	28	7.0	20	0	0	0
Career		100	82	323	4,203	13.0	64	17	17	87	5.1	20	1	3	0
