= Litchfield High School (Gadsden, Alabama) =

High school in Alabama, United States

Coordinates: 34°00′08″N 85°57′56″W

Litchfield High School was a public high school in Gadsden, Alabama, serving grades nine through twelve. LHS was founded in 1958 as Litchfield Junior High School and was converted into a high school in 1975. The school bears the name of the former president of Goodyear Tire and Rubber Company and inventor of the first tubeless automobile tire, Paul Weeks Litchfield.

It closed after the 2005–2006 academic school year after the Gadsden City Board of Education voted to construct a new facility - Gadsden City High School - and consolidate Litchfield, Emma Sansom, and Gadsden High Schools into one school.

Cory Middle school was later moved into the Litchfield High School buildings and renamed Litchfield Middle School.
