= Noccalula Falls Park =

Park located in Gadsden, Alabama, United States

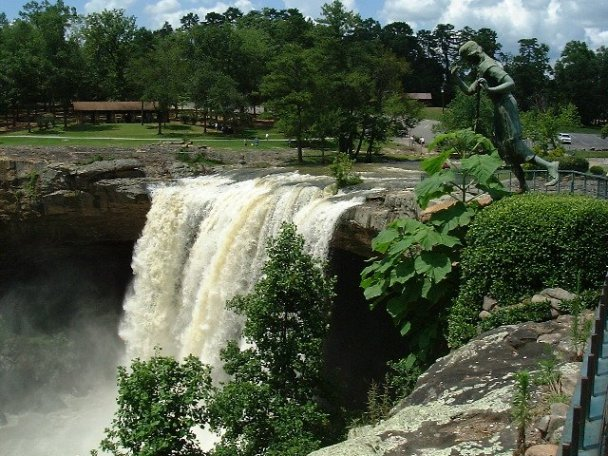
- Noccalula Falls

- Location within Alabama
- Type: City park
- Location: Gadsden, Alabama
- Coordinates: 34°2′29.364″N 86°1′16.608″W
- Area: 250 acres (100 ha)
- Created: 1946
- Operator: City of Gadsden Parks & Recreation
- Camp sites: 120
- Website: Noccalula Falls

Noccalula Falls Park is a 250-acre (101-ha) public park located in Gadsden, Alabama, United States. The main feature of the park is a 90-foot (27-m) waterfall. Trails wind through Black Creek Gorge past caves, an aboriginal fort, an abandoned dam, pioneer homestead, and Civil War carvings. The park also features a petting zoo, mini-golf course, the Gilliland-Reese Covered Bridge (built 1899) and a replica 1863 C. P. Huntington train ride.

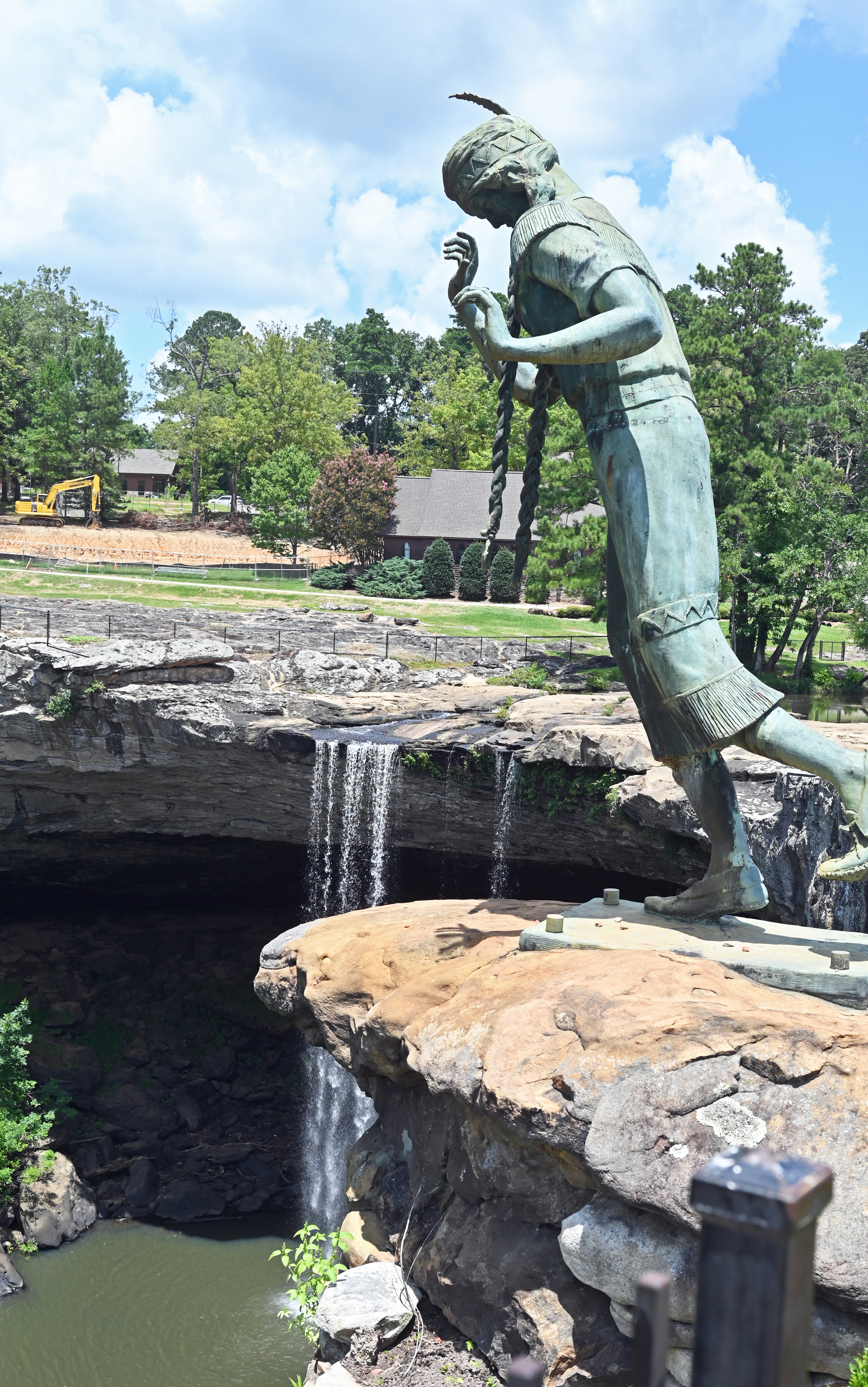
Statue representing Noccalula

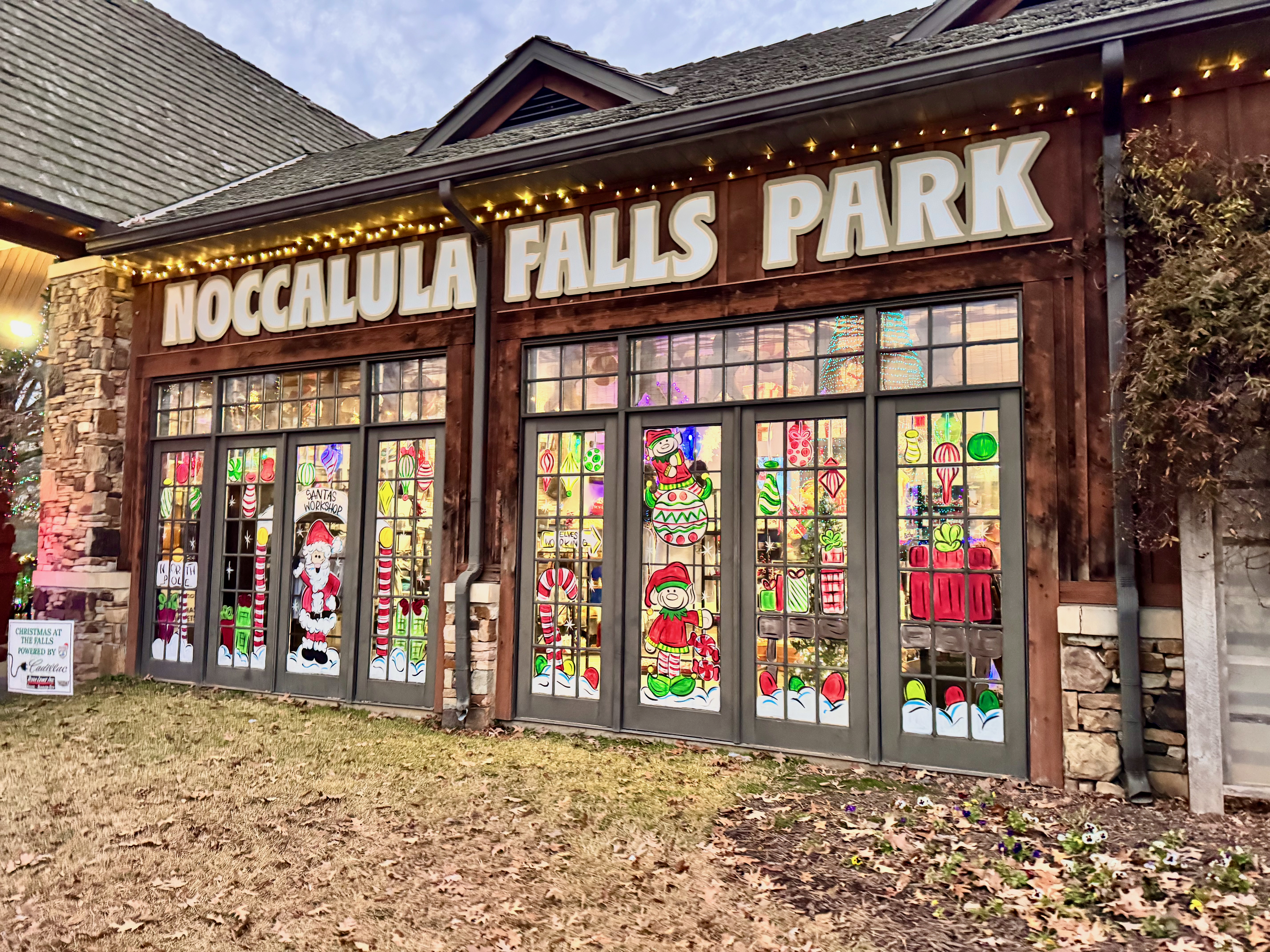
Noccalula Falls Park entrance

Noccalula Falls Park was listed on the Alabama Register of Landmarks and Heritage on May 12, 1976. It was rated in 2017 as the best campsite in Alabama in a 50-state survey conducted by MSN.com.

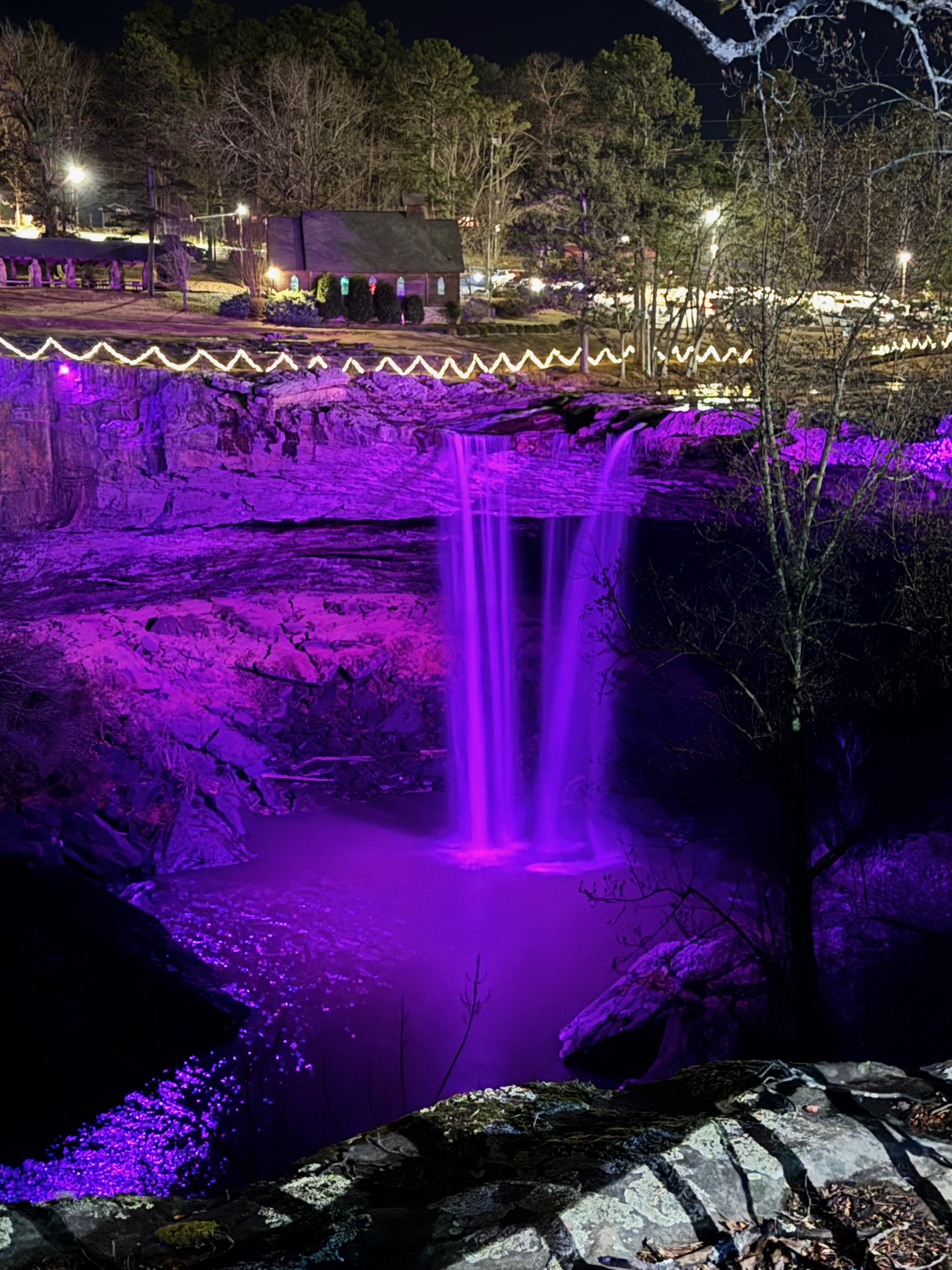
Noccalula Falls during the annual Christmas at the Falls event

The falls drop itself has been run successfully in whitewater kayaks on multiple occasions, beginning in late November 2011 when three expert kayakers ran the drop. The water level was unusually high, permitting a deep enough pool to form at the base of the falls. Local law enforcement has since issued citations to paddlers for running the falls, as the state does not consider this stretch a state-owned water bottom.

The Noccalula Falls Botanical Gardens displays over 25,000 azaleas.

== History ==
The name Noccalula probably derives from the Cherokee term ama uqwalelvyi, which translates roughly as "place where water thunders." A man named Faxon surveyed Noccalula Falls in 1859 and carved his name and date on the wall behind the waterfall.

In the second half of the 19th century, the Gadsden Land and Improvement Company operated a tavern and dance hall in a cave behind the waterfall; attempting to increase the flat area inside using dynamite led to a cave-in.

Most of the park is on land once owned by R. A. Mitchell, a former mayor of Gadsden, who bought 169 acres in 1909 and intended it to become a city park. His daughter Sadie Mitchell Elmore inherited it and offered it to the city for $50,000 in 1940; after an election approving the purchase, the city finally bought the land in 1946 for $70,000, and additional acreage in 1959. Improvements started in 1950. R. A. Mitchell Elementary School is located across the street from the falls.

== Statue and legend ==
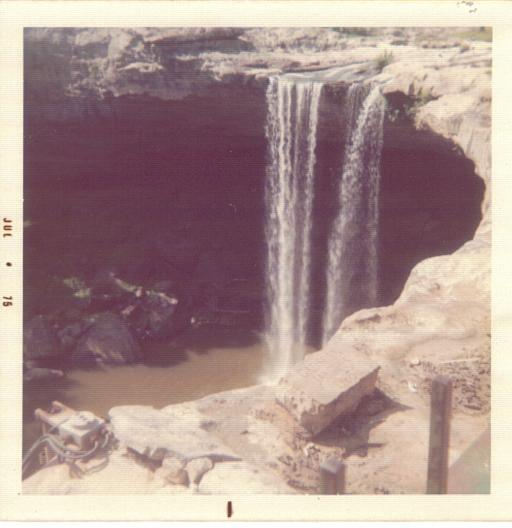
Noccalula Falls at a lower ebb in July 1975

Above Noccalula Falls is a nine-foot-tall bronze statue of a young Cherokee woman, Noccalula, who, according to local legends, plunged to her death after being ordered by her father to marry a man she did not love. The legend is very similar to Wisconsin's Winona story as well as events from James Fenimore Cooper's The Last of the Mohicans. The statue is the work of Suzanne Silvercruys and was dedicated in September 1969; it was paid for by a fund-raising drive by the Gadsden Woman's Club that included school children collecting pennies. Although no peer-reviewed historic journals have evaluated the veracity of the legend, at least one independent researcher has published evidence suggesting that the story is apocryphal.

== See also ==
- Natural Bridge, Alabama
- List of botanical gardens and arboretums in Alabama
- List of waterfalls
- List of waterfalls in Alabama
