= Gadsden City High School =

American public high school

Coordinates: 33.99568°N 86.03454°W

Location
- 1917 Black Creek Parkway; Gadsden, Alabama 35904; United States

Information
- Type: Public
- Established: 2006 (20 years ago)
- School district: Gadsden City
- CEEB code: 011192
- Principal: Joel Gulledge
- Staff: 84.07 (on an FTE basis)
- Grades: 9-12
- Student to teacher ratio: 15.57
- Colors: Black, cardinal, and silver
- Athletics: 14 Varsity Sports
- Athletics conference: AHSAA, Class 6A
- Mascot: Clash
- Nickname: Titans
- Website: gchs.gcs.k12.al.us

Gadsden City High School is a public high school, located in Gadsden, Alabama, United States serving approximately 1500 students in grades nine through twelve. The school is the only high school in the Gadsden City School System. Admission is open to any students living in Etowah County, Alabama.

== Creation ==
Founded in 2006 as a result of mergers between Litchfield, Emma Sansom, and Gadsden High Schools, the school is the largest in Etowah County and Northeast Alabama.

The school is accredited by the Southern Association of Colleges and Schools. Its first graduating class consisted of 272 graduates. Athletic teams are called the Titans and the school's mascot is referred to as Clash. The official school colors are cardinal, black, and silver.

== Operation ==
Gadsden City operates on the block system. School begins at 7:48 a.m. and lasts until 3:07 p.m.

GCHS offers 7 Advanced Placement courses, out of a possible 31. The school also offers a variety of career technology courses in cosmetology, automotive technology, electrical wiring, HVAC, computer technology, fashion design, and accounting, just to name a few. Most of these career technology courses are taught in conjunction with Gadsden State Community College, allowing Titan students to learn in a college environment with standard procedures and equipment. Fine arts courses include orchestra, jazz and concert bands, chorus, piano lab, photography, broadcast journalism, journalism, graphic arts, painting, drawing, ceramics and pottery, drama, and technical theatre.

== Athletics ==
The Titans football team won the Class 6A Region 7 title in 2007 and 2009 as well as the girls basketball team finishing as the 2007 Class 6A State Runner-up. The Titan football team finished as 4th runner up in the class 7A Region in 2016. The boys basketball team has won four consecutive Class 6A Area 13 titles, while posting a perfect 32-0 versus area competition. The boy's varsity soccer made it to the second round of playoffs after beating #2 ranked Huntsville in 2008. The school fields athletic teams in track and field, cross country, swimming, girls' and boys' golf, soccer and tennis, wrestling, softball, baseball, and volleyball.

Gadsden City High School Scholar's Bowl teams have recently enjoyed tremendous success. The team won both the Varsity and Junior Varsity Alabama State Championships in 2014, then went on to win a national title in 2016. In 2019, the Junior Varsity team won the Questions Unlimited national title after going undefeated in championship play.

== Notable people ==
- Alonzo Harris, professional football player
- Dre Kirkpatrick, professional football player
- Darnell Mooney, professional football player
- Jordan Veasy, professional football player
