= WTDR-FM =

Radio station in Talladega, Alabama

- Talladega, Alabama; United States
- Broadcast area: Talladega County
- Frequency: 92.7 MHz
- Branding: Thunder 92.7

Programming
- Format: Country music; Classic country

Ownership
- Owner: Jeff Beck; (The Jeff Beck Broadcasting Group, LLC)
- Sister stations: WFZX, WTDR, WGAD, WWGC

History
- First air date: November 10, 1972
- Former call signs: WHTB (1972–1985); WEYY-FM (1985–2000); WTDR (2000–2012)
- Call sign meaning: Thunder

Technical information
- Licensing authority: FCC
- Facility ID: 29722
- Class: A
- ERP: 2,600 watts
- HAAT: 154 meters (505 ft)
- Transmitter coordinates: 33°29′12″N 85°59′15″W

Links
- Public license information: Public file; LMS
- Webcast: Listen live

WTDR-FM (92.7 FM, "Thunder 92.7") is a radio station licensed to serve Talladega, Alabama, United States. The station is owned by Jeff Beck, through licensee The Jeff Beck Broadcasting Group, LLC. It airs a combination classic country and country music format.

== History ==
New FM station WHTB Stereo 93 began broadcasting with 250 watts of effective radiated power at 92.7 MHz on November 10, 1972. The station was launched under the ownership of Jimmy E. Woodward. On April 1, 1985, the station was assigned the call letters WEYY-FM (to match former AM sister station WEYY, now known as WTAZ) by the Federal Communications Commission.

In February 1987, Woodard Broadcasting Company owner Jimmy E. Woodard agreed to sell WEYY-FM to Radio Talladega, Inc. The deal was approved by the FCC on February 25, 1987.

In August 1992, Radio Talladega, Inc., reached an agreement to sell this station to James H. Jacobs, Jr., and Laura A. Jacobs, the equal co-owners of Jacobs Broadcast Group, Inc. The deal was approved by the FCC on September 16, 1992, and the transaction was consummated on September 30, 1992.

The station was assigned the WTDR call letters by the FCC on October 25, 2000. The station flipped from country music to a classic country format on January 5, 2009. Less than a year later, however, Thunder began to add country music back into its playlist.

On September 5, 2012, WTDR, along with its sister station WFZX, were sold to Jeff Beck, owner of The Jeff Beck Broadcasting Group, LLC. On September 12, 2012, the station's call sign was changed to WTDR-FM. The sale of the two stations to Beck was consummated on January 3, 2012, at a purchase price of $745,000.

== Construction permit ==
On November 16, 2005, the station was granted a construction permit to change the station's community of license to Munford, Alabama. The station's effective radiated power would be reduced to 250 watts but the antenna would be raised to a height above average terrain of 481.2 meters (1579 feet) on the tower currently used by television station WCIQ located at 33°29'06"N, 85°48'32"W, on the top of Mount Cheaha, the highest point in the state of Alabama. This permit expired on November 16, 2008 with the move not yet completed, but on November 24, 2008, the station applied for an identical construction permit. That application was approved on January 29, 2009 and expired on January 29, 2012 with no action having been taken by the station.
