= Gadsden High School (Alabama) =

High School in Alabama, United States

Information
- Closed: 2006
- Gender: Mixed

Gadsden High School in Gadsden, Alabama was closed after the 2005–2006 school year. It consolidated with Emma Sansom High School and Litchfield High School to form Gadsden City High School.

The school was involved in a historic case of racism against African American students in Alabama. Ten students including Jennie Patrick were discriminated against by both teachers and students after entering the school through people protesting about racial integration in schools.

== Notable alumni ==
- Derrick Allen, American basketball player
- Hersh Freeman, Major League Baseball pitcher
- Rex Keeling, professional football player
- Mathew Knowles, music executive
- Jennie Patrick, first African American woman in the United States to earn a doctorate in chemical engineering (MIT)
- Aaron Pearson, American football player
- Robert Bruce Propst, judge
- Gary D. Speer, U.S. Army lieutenant general
- Jerry Watford, American football player
