= Emma Sansom High School =

Defunct high school in Alabama, United States

Coordinates: 34°01′23″N 86°02′14″W

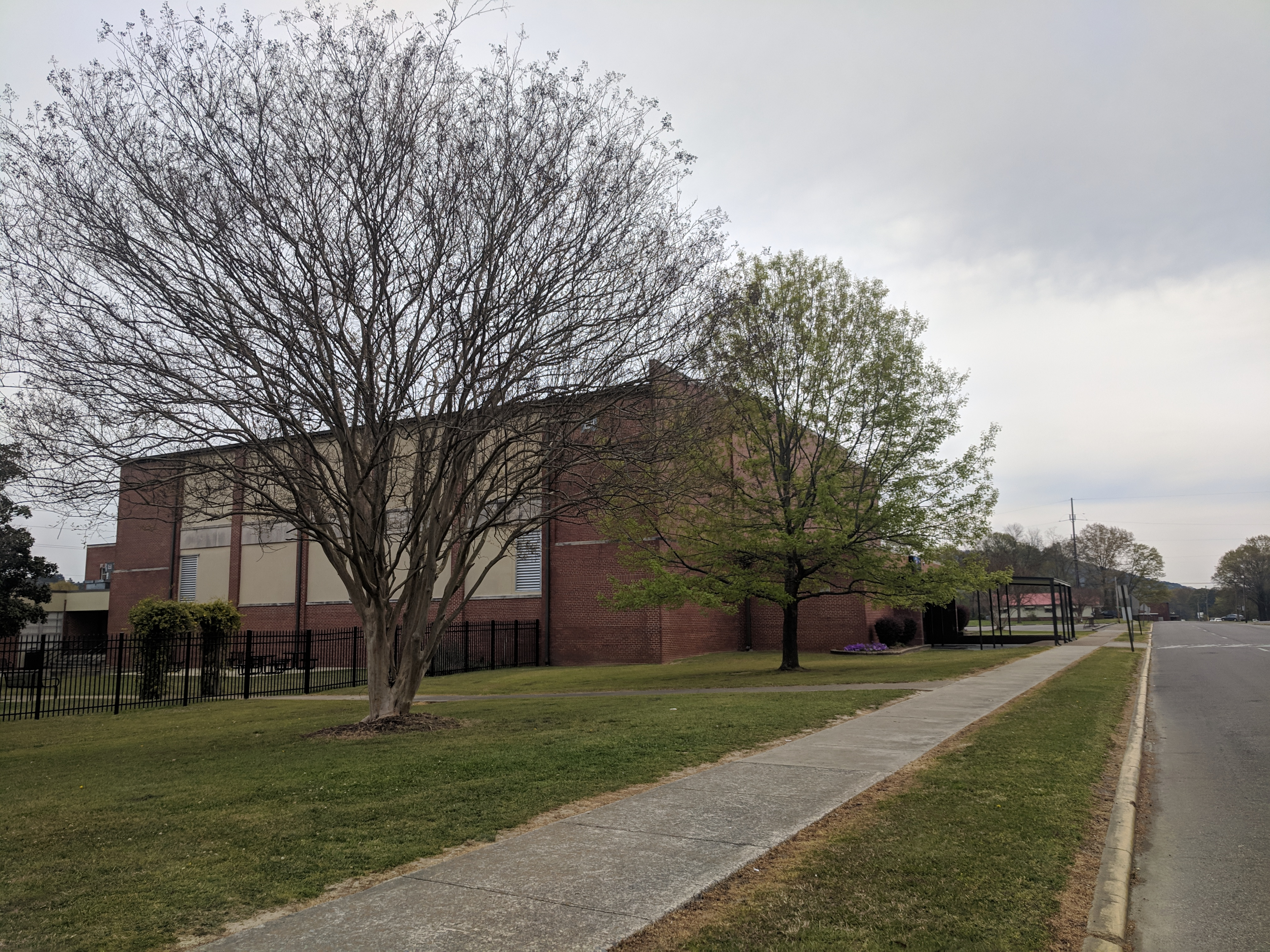

Information
- Established: 1929
- Closed: 2006

Emma Sansom High School (opened 1929 – closed 2006) was a high school located in Gadsden, Alabama. It was named for a young girl (Emma Sansom) who was credited with helping General Nathan Bedford Forrest to cross Black Creek in Gadsden, Alabama and get his troops ahead of Union troops, thus stopping an impending attack upon Rome, Georgia during the Civil War.

== History ==
=== Closure ===
Emma Sansom High School was closed in 2006 when the Gadsden City Board of Education consolidated the city high schools into All City High School, now known as the Gadsden City High School. The Emma Sansom High School building was converted into a middle school beginning with the 2006/2007 academic year. General Forrest Middle School students were moved to the newly renamed Emma Sansom Middle School.

== Awards and recognition ==
The school has 350 students and is currently a Title 1 school with 75% of students being on free and reduced lunches. Emma Sansom middle school received a B on their state report card for the 2017 school year. That was the highest middle school get in Etowah County.

== Former headteachers ==
- In 2018 Jacqueline Tiller became principal.
