= WTDR (AM) =

Radio station in Gadsden, Alabama

- Gadsden, Alabama; United States
- Frequency: 1350 kHz
- Branding: Thunder 1350

Programming
- Format: Country

Ownership
- Owner: Jeff Beck; (Rainbow City Media LLC)

History
- First air date: 1947
- Former call signs: WGAD (1947–2007); WJBY (2007–2011); WGAD (2011–2012)
- Call sign meaning: thunder

Technical information
- Licensing authority: FCC
- Facility ID: 13849
- Class: B
- Power: 5,000 watts (day); 1,000 watts (night)
- Transmitter coordinates: 34°01′03″N 86°05′15″W
- Translator: 99.3 W257CT (Gadsden)

Links
- Public license information: Public file; LMS
- Webcast: http://radio.securenetsystems.net/v5/WTDR

WTDR (1350 AM) is an American radio station licensed to serve Gadsden, Alabama, United States. The station was established in 1947, and the broadcast license is held by Rainbow Media Group LLC, owned by Jeff Beck. The FCC-approved sale was completed October 24, 2011.

== Programming ==
WGAD changed to a news/talk format on October 10, 2011. The "Gadsden's Gold" oldies format the station broadcast for many years was dropped, making it the second AM station in Gadsden to air news and talk programming. The new operators kept the 80's music and is featuring Big 80's & More weekends on Saturday and Sunday. In October 2012, the format again changed to simulcast country music from WTDR-FM, a sister station.

Oldies format logo

== History ==
This station was assigned the "WGAD" call letters by the Federal Communications Commission (FCC) when it first went on the air in 1947. WGAD signed on with 1,000 watts day non-directional, and 1,000 watts at night with a two tower directional signal, towers located west of Gadsden proper in Attalla, Alabama.

In 1949, Valley Broadcasting requested transfer of the license to General Newspapers for a reported price of $40,000.

In 1954, Coos Broadcasting Company, headed by Dick Biddle, acquired WGAD for a reported $40,000

In 1957, WGAD was sold to a group of broadcasters consisting of Ed Z. Carrel - who also served as General Manager, Lavelle Jackson, and Congressman Albert Rains.

The station's daytime power was raised to 5,000 watts.

WGAD was Gadsden's only full-time station until 1960. The station was also the one of first to jump on the pop music bandwagon in the late 1950s, when it began broadcasting Top 40 music with ABC news and special programs.

In 1961, WAVU announcer Bill Hagler accepted the job as program director of WGAD.

In 1963, WGAD news reporter Charlie Hicks reported that an anonymous caller stated that civil rights activist William Lewis Moore was walking down the highway, and something newsworthy was about to happen. His body was located along the highway, shot in the head at close range.

In 1985, WGAD switched to a news/talk radio format.

In 2001, the station began broadcasting a satellite-fed oldies music format.

Gerald Dilts purchased WGAD in 2002 then sold it to Dave Hedrick and the DR Radio Group in 2004.

In 2007 the station was sold to Coosa River Communications, owner of Rainbow City, Alabama-based WJBY (930 AM), who effected a format and call sign swap with its new sister station.

On October 4, 2007, the WGAD call sign was moved from 1350 AM to 930 AM while sister station WJBY in Rainbow City, Alabama, had its call sign moved from 930 AM to 1350 AM.

On October 5, 2010, a judgment by consent was reached between plaintiff Gadsden Broadcasting, Inc., and defendants Coosa River Communications, Inc., and its owners in settlement of claims over outstanding debts. The defendants agreed to turn over station property of AM 930 (WJBY) to the plaintiff, cease broadcasting, and file an application to return control of the station's broadcast license to the plaintiffs.

On October 10, 2010, WJBY's broadcast signal went dark, and WGAD was again back on AM-1350. In its application for special temporary authority to remain off the air, the station noted that its equipment had been repossessed. On October 20, 2010, an application was filed with the FCC to transfer the license for WGAD from Coosa River Communications to Gadsden Broadcasting Company, Inc. The application notes that this in settlement of a debt of just over $160,000.

In October 2010, the stations began the process to regain their original (prior to 2007) call letters. This station regained the "WGAD" call sign on January 19, 2011.

Gadsden Radio Media Inc., owned by Jeff Beck, began operating the station in June 2011 under a local marketing agreement while negotiations for the purchase of the station from The DR Group LLC were underway. The FCC approved the sale on August 22, 2011, and the transaction was consummated on October 24, 2011. Jeff Beck is sole owner of both Gadsden Radio Media Inc, and Rainbow City Media LLC, according to the application to transfer the license.
