= 2009 Alabama Crimson Tide football team =

American college football season

2009 Alabama Crimson Tide football

Consensus national champion SEC champion SEC Western Division champion

SEC Championship Game, W 32–13 vs. Florida

BCS National Championship Game, W 37–21 vs. Texas
- Conference: Southeastern Conference
- Western Division

Ranking
- Coaches: No. 1
- AP: No. 1
- Record: 14–0 (8–0 SEC)
- Head coach: Nick Saban (3rd season)
- Offensive coordinator: Jim McElwain (2nd season)
- Offensive scheme: Multiple, Wildcat
- Defensive coordinator: Kirby Smart (2nd season)
- Base defense: 3–4
- MVPs: Rolando McClain; Mark Ingram II
- Captains: Rolando McClain; Javier Arenas; Mike Johnson
- Home stadium: Bryant–Denny Stadium

2009 Southeastern Conference football standings
| | Conf. | | | Overall |
| Team | W | | L | W | | L |
|---|---|---|---|---|---|---|
Eastern Division
| No. 3 Florida x% | 8 | – | 0 | 13 | – | 1 |
| Georgia | 4 | – | 4 | 8 | – | 5 |
| Tennessee | 4 | – | 4 | 7 | – | 6 |
| Kentucky | 3 | – | 5 | 7 | – | 6 |
| South Carolina | 3 | – | 5 | 7 | – | 6 |
| Vanderbilt | 0 | – | 8 | 2 | – | 10 |
Western Division
| No. 1 Alabama x$# | 8 | – | 0 | 14 | – | 0 |
| No. 17 LSU | 5 | – | 3 | 9 | – | 4 |
| No. 20 Ole Miss | 4 | – | 4 | 9 | – | 4 |
| Arkansas | 3 | – | 5 | 8 | – | 5 |
| Auburn | 3 | – | 5 | 8 | – | 5 |
| Mississippi State | 3 | – | 5 | 5 | – | 7 |
Championship: Alabama 32, Florida 13
# – BCS National Champion; $ – BCS representative as conference champion; % – BCS at-large representative; x – Division champion/co-champions; Rankings from AP Poll

The 2009 Alabama Crimson Tide football team represented the University of Alabama as a member of the Southeastern Conference (SEC) during the 2009 NCAA Division I FBS football season. Led by third-year head coach Nick Saban, the Crimson Tide compiled an overall record of 14–0 with a mark of 8–0 in conference play, winning the SEC's Western Division title. Alabama advanced to the SEC Championship Game, defeating the defending national champion, Florida, to win the SEC title. The Crimson Tide then beat Texas in the BCS National Championship Game, winning their first national title since 1992.

Alabama closed the regular season with a 12–0 record including four wins against top 25-ranked teams. The Crimson Tide met Florida for the SEC Championship in a rematch of the 2008 contest. Alabama was victorious by a final score of 32–13. The following day, final Bowl Championship Series (BCS) standings were unveiled. No. 1 ranked Alabama would meet No. 2 ranked Texas for the BCS National Championship. In the BCS National Championship Game, the Crimson Tide defeated the Longhorns 37–21 to capture their first national championship since 1992. Alabama won its third SEC championship since the inception of the SEC Championship Game in 1992 and 22nd SEC title overall. The victory over Texas gave the Crimson Tide their 13th national championship, their eighth wire service title since the AP poll began in 1936, and their ninth perfect season since 1925. The season included victories over the three previous programs to win a national championship: Florida, LSU, and Texas.

The season marked the first time an Alabama player won the Heisman Trophy with Mark Ingram II winning the award over Stanford running back Toby Gerhart. Other award winners included Rolando McClain, who won the Butkus Award and the Jack Lambert Award, and defensive coordinator Kirby Smart, who won the Broyles Award as the nation's top assistant coach. Six Crimson Tide players were named to various All-America Teams with Terrence Cody, Mike Johnson, and Javier Arenas being consensus selections and Ingram and McClain each being unanimous selections.

== Schedule ==
The Sagarin computer ratings calculated Alabama's strength of schedule to be the most difficult out of the 245 Division I teams. The Congrove Computer Rankings also calculated it as the most difficult out of the 120 Division I FBS teams in its rankings. Alabama's 2009 schedule was officially released on December 19, 2008. In accordance with conference rules, Alabama faced all five Western Division opponents: Arkansas, Auburn, LSU, Mississippi State, and Ole Miss. They also faced three Eastern Division opponents: official SEC rival Tennessee, Kentucky, and South Carolina. Alabama did not play SEC opponents Georgia and Vanderbilt. Although not on the regular season schedule, Bama met Florida in the SEC Championship Game.

Alabama also played five non-conference games. For the season opener, the Tide played in the Chick-fil-A Kickoff Game against Virginia Tech at the Georgia Dome in Atlanta. The non-conference schedule also included games against Florida International and North Texas of the Sun Belt Conference and UT-Chattanooga of the Football Championship Subdivision (FCS). For the 2010 BCS National Championship Game, Alabama played Texas for the first time since the 1982 Cotton Bowl Classic.

| Date | Time | Opponent | Rank | Site | TV | Result | Attendance |
|---|---|---|---|---|---|---|---|
| September 5 | 7:10 p.m. | vs. No. 7 Virginia Tech* | No. 5 | Georgia Dome; Atlanta, GA (Chick-fil-A Kickoff Game, College GameDay) | ABC | W 34–24 | 74,954 |
| September 12 | 6:07 p.m. | Florida International* | No. 4 | Bryant–Denny Stadium; Tuscaloosa, AL | CTSN PPV | W 40–14 | 92,012 |
| September 19 | 11:21 a.m. | North Texas* | No. 4 | Bryant–Denny Stadium; Tuscaloosa, AL | SECN | W 53–7 | 92,012 |
| September 26 | 2:30 p.m. | Arkansas | No. 3 | Bryant–Denny Stadium; Tuscaloosa, AL | CBS | W 35–7 | 92,012 |
| October 3 | 11:21 a.m. | at Kentucky | No. 3 | Commonwealth Stadium; Lexington, KY | SECN | W 38–20 | 70,967 |
| October 10 | 2:30 p.m. | at No. 20 Ole Miss | No. 3 | Vaught–Hemingway Stadium; Oxford, MS (rivalry) | CBS | W 22–3 | 62,657 |
| October 17 | 6:45 p.m. | No. 22 South Carolina^{†} | No. 2 | Bryant–Denny Stadium; Tuscaloosa, AL | ESPN | W 20–6 | 92,012 |
| October 24 | 2:30 p.m. | Tennessee | No. 1 | Bryant–Denny Stadium; Tuscaloosa, AL (Third Saturday in October) | CBS | W 12–10 | 92,012 |
| November 7 | 2:30 p.m. | No. 9 LSU | No. 3 | Bryant–Denny Stadium; Tuscaloosa, AL (rivalry) | CBS | W 24–15 | 92,012 |
| November 14 | 6:00 p.m. | at Mississippi State | No. 3 | Davis Wade Stadium; Starkville, MS (rivalry) | ESPN | W 31–3 | 58,103 |
| November 21 | 11:21 a.m. | Chattanooga* | No. 2 | Bryant–Denny Stadium; Tuscaloosa, AL | SECN | W 45–0 | 92,012 |
| November 27 | 1:30 p.m. | at Auburn | No. 2 | Jordan–Hare Stadium; Auburn, AL (Iron Bowl) | CBS | W 26–21 | 87,451 |
| December 5 | 3:00 p.m. | vs. No. 1 Florida | No. 2 | Georgia Dome; Atlanta, GA (SEC Championship Game, "Game of the Century", rivalry, College GameDay) | CBS | W 32–13 | 75,514 |
| January 7, 2010 | 7:39 p.m. | vs. No. 2 Texas* | No. 1 | Rose Bowl; Pasadena, CA (BCS National Championship Game, College GameDay) | ABC | W 37–21 | 94,906 |
*Non-conference game; ^{†}Homecoming; Rankings from AP Poll released prior to the game; All times are in Central time

== Rankings ==
Entering the 2009 season, the Crimson Tide was ranked No. 5 in the AP and Coaches' Preseason Polls. By week seven Alabama moved into the No. 1 ranking in the AP Poll and the No. 2 ranking in both the Coaches' Poll and the initial BCS rankings. After dropping as low as No. 3, following the victory against Florida in the SEC Championship Game Alabama captured the No. 1 ranking in the AP and Coaches' Polls as well as in the final BCS rankings. Following the victory over Texas in the BCS Championship Game, Alabama was selected a unanimous No. 1 by the AP and as the No. 1 team in the Coaches' Poll.

Ranking movements Legend: ██ Increase in ranking ██ Decrease in ranking т = Tied with team above or below
| | Week | | | | | | | | | | | | | | | |
| Poll | Pre | 1 | 2 | 3 | 4 | 5 | 6 | 7 | 8 | 9 | 10 | 11 | 12 | 13 | 14 | Final |
|---|---|---|---|---|---|---|---|---|---|---|---|---|---|---|---|---|
| AP | 5 | 4 | 4 | 3 | 3 | 3 | 2 | 1 | 2 | 3 | 3 | 2 | 2 | 2 | 1 | 1 |
| Coaches | 5 | 4 | 4 | 3 | 3 | 3 | 3 | 2 | 2 | 3 | 3 | 3 | 3 | 3 | 1 | 1 |
| Harris | Not released | | | | 3 | 3 | T–2 | 2 | 2 | 3 | 3 | 3 | 3 | 3 | 1 | Not released |
| BCS | Not released | | | | | | | 2 | 2 | 2 | 2 | 2 | 2 | 2 | 1 | Not released |

== Before the season ==
During the 2008 campaign, the Crimson Tide completed a perfect 12–0 regular season record with wins over No. 9 Clemson, No. 3 Georgia, longtime rival Tennessee, No. 16 LSU, and in-state rival Auburn to end a six-game losing streak in the Iron Bowl. The Tide went on to lose their final two games in the postseason to end the season 12–2. They lost to the Florida Gators (31–20) in the SEC Championship Game, and to the Utah Utes (31–17) in the Sugar Bowl. Alabama reached No. 1 in the AP and Coaches' Polls for the first time since the final polls in 1992 and during the regular season for the first time since 1980 between weeks ten and fourteen. The Tide reached No. 1 in the BCS rankings for the first time in school history between weeks ten and fourteen. The team finished the 2008 season with a final ranking of No. 6 in both the AP and Coaches' Polls.

In February 2009, Alabama signed the No. 1 recruiting class according to Rivals and the No. 2 recruiting class according to Scout. Spring practice began on March 13 and concluded with the annual A-Day game on April 18. Televised live by ESPN, the Crimson team defeated the White team by a score of 14–7 before 84,050 fans in Bryant–Denny Stadium. Greg McElroy and Marquis Maze were named co-MVPs of the game.

On June 11, 2009, the NCAA Committee on Infractions sanctioned Alabama for "major violations" of NCAA policies as a result of athletes who received improper benefits in 16 of 19 NCAA sports, including football. As a penalty, the football program was forced to vacate 21 victories from the 2005, 2006, and 2007 seasons in addition to being placed on three years probation, ending in June 2012. The university stated that none of the textbooks or materials identified in the investigation were used for profit, and that the athletes involved who still had eligibility remaining were to pay restitution for the additional materials identified as part of the inquiry. Alabama appealed the ruling to the NCAA Infractions Appeals Committee in late June, but was unsuccessful; the Committee upheld the sanctions in March 2010.

During SEC Media Days in July, voters selected Alabama and Florida to again win their divisions, with 63 of 64 ballots choosing Florida to win the SEC Championship Game. Voters selected Julio Jones, Mike Johnson, Terrence Cody, Rolando McClain, Javier Arenas (as a defensive back), and Leigh Tiffin to the Preseason All-SEC First Team and selected Mark Ingram II and Arenas (as a return specialist) to the Preseason All-SEC Second Team.

By August, Alabama had 19 players on 11 different preseason award watch lists. These included Cody and McClain for the Chuck Bednarik Award; Jones for the Fred Biletnikoff Award; Dont'a Hightower and McClain for the Butkus Award; Leigh Tiffin for the Lou Groza Award; Cody, Hightower, Mike Johnson, and McClain for the Lombardi Award; Cody and McClain for the Lott Trophy; Jones for the Maxwell Award; Javier Arenas, Cody, and McClain for the Bronko Nagurski Trophy; Cody and Johnson for the Outland Trophy; Arenas for the Jim Thorpe Award; and Mark Ingram II for the Doak Walker Award.

=== Returning starters ===
Alabama had 16 returning starters from the previous season, including eight on defense, four on offense, and all of the special teams. The most notable departures from the previous year were Andre Smith, Antoine Caldwell, and Marlon Davis on the offensive line; John Parker Wilson at quarterback; Glen Coffee at running back; and Rashad Johnson at safety.

Defense

| Player | Class | Position |
|---|---|---|
| Brandon Deaderick | Senior | Defensive end |
| Terrence Cody | Senior | Nose tackle |
| Cory Reamer | Senior | Linebacker |
| Rolando McClain | Junior | Linebacker |
| Dont'a Hightower | Sophomore | Linebacker |
| Javier Arenas | Senior | Cornerback |
| Kareem Jackson | Junior | Cornerback |
| Justin Woodall | Senior | Safety |

Offense

| Player | Class | Position |
|---|---|---|
| Julio Jones | Sophomore | Wide receiver |
| Mike McCoy | Senior | Wide receiver |
| Drew Davis | Senior | Offensive tackle |
| Mike Johnson | Senior | Offensive guard |

Special teams

| Player | Class | Position |
|---|---|---|
| P. J. Fitzgerald | Senior | Punter |
| Leigh Tiffin | Senior | Placekicker |
| Javier Arenas | Senior | Return specialist |
| Brian Selman | Senior | Long snapper |

== Game summaries ==
=== Virginia Tech ===
Chick-fil-A Kickoff Game

| Team | 1 | 2 | 3 | 4 | Total |
|---|---|---|---|---|---|
| • #5 Alabama | 9 | 7 | 0 | 18 | 34 |
| #7 Virginia Tech | 7 | 10 | 0 | 7 | 24 |

- Location: Atlanta, Georgia
- Game start: 8:10 p.m.
- Elapsed time: 3:38
- Game attendance: 74,954
- Game weather: Indoors
- Referee: Matt Austin
- TV announcers (ABC): Brent Musburger (play-by-play), Kirk Herbstreit (color), Lisa Salters (sideline)

After defeating Clemson in the inaugural Chick-fil-A Kickoff Game, Alabama announced in December 2008 they would return for the 2009 edition against the Virginia Tech Hokies. The Tide dominated play for most of the game, outgaining Tech in total offense by 498 yards to 155, but mistakes, penalties, and poor play by the special teams allowed the Hokies to hang on until 18 fourth-quarter points sealed the 34–24 Alabama victory.

Bama scored first with field goals of 49 and 34 yards from Leigh Tiffin to take an early 6–0 lead. The Hokies responded with a 98-yard Dyrell Roberts kickoff return for a touchdown to give Tech a 7–6 lead. Following the recovery of a Ryan Williams fumble by Brian Selman deep in Hokie territory, the Tide retook the lead 9–7 on a 32-yard Tiffin field goal. Early in the second quarter, Antoine Hopkins intercepted a Greg McElroy pass. On the ensuing possession, Tech led 10–9 after a successful 28-yard Matt Waldron field goal. Alabama responded by driving 76 yards for a touchdown and a 16–10 lead, with the big plays coming on a 14-yard run by Mark Ingram II, passes of 16 and 10 yards from McElroy to Julio Jones and the score coming on a 19-yard Roy Upchurch run. On the next Virginia Tech possession, three personal fouls and a pass interference penalty carried the Hokies downfield with Williams scoring on a one-yard touchdown run. The score remained 17–16 at the half after Tiffin missed a 36-yard field goal at the end of the second quarter.

In the third quarter Roy Upchurch fumbled the ball at the Tech nine after a long run, negating the lone scoring opportunity for either team in the third quarter. Still down by a point in the fourth quarter, McElroy hit Marquis Maze for a 48-yard completion to the Virginia Tech six-yard line, and Ingram scored a touchdown on the next play. A successful two-point conversion pass from McElroy to Colin Peek gave Alabama a 24–17 lead. On the ensuing kickoff, Davon Morgan fumbled and Chris Rogers recovered for the Tide at the Tech 21. The following Alabama drive stalled at the 3, but Tiffin's fourth field goal made the score 27–17. Poor kickoff coverage and penalties set up a 32-yard Williams that run cut the lead to 27–24 late in the fourth quarter. Alabama quickly struck back as Ingram rushed for 39 yards, McElroy completed a 19-yard pass to Peek, and then threw to Ingram for an 18-yard touchdown and a 34–24 lead. The Hokies never threatened to score again and Alabama won its opener, 34–24. Ingram led the Tide with 150 yards rushing on 26 carries and a pair of touchdowns, and he was named the SEC Offensive Player of the Week. The victory improved Alabama's all-time record against the Hokies to 11–1.

=== FIU ===
| Team | 1 | 2 | 3 | 4 | Total |
|---|---|---|---|---|---|
| FIU | 7 | 7 | 0 | 0 | 14 |
| • #4 Alabama | 10 | 10 | 6 | 14 | 40 |

- Location: Tuscaloosa, Alabama
- Game start: 6:07 p.m.
- Elapsed time: 3:10
- Game attendance: 92,012
- Game weather: Partly Cloudy, 78, Wind: 5mph from ENE
- Referee: Penn Wagers
- TV announcers (CTSN PPV/ESPN360.com): Chris Stewart (play-by-play), Tyler Watts (color), Barry Krauss (sideline)

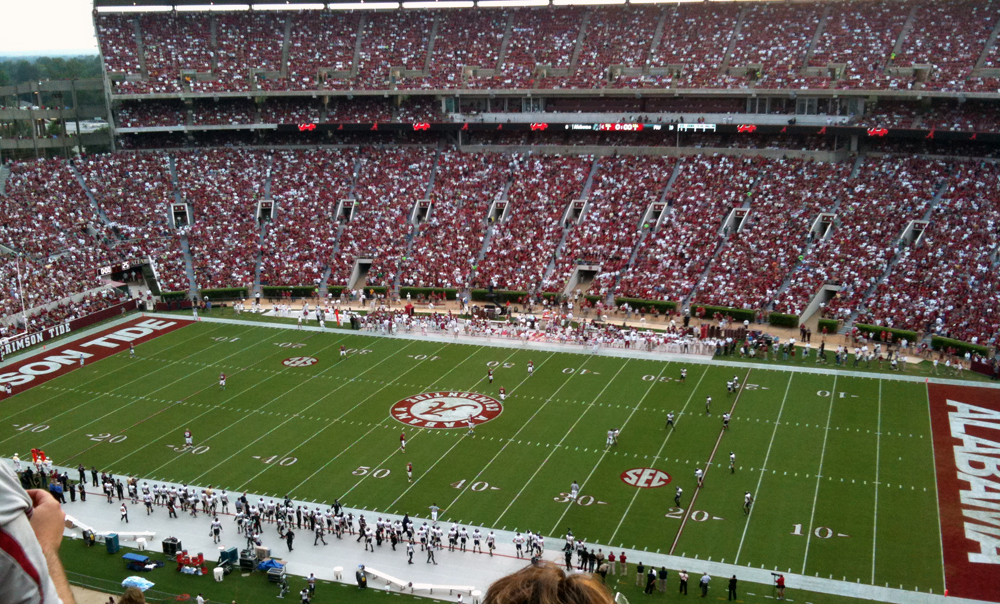
The two teams getting ready for the opening kickoff

The Golden Panthers of Florida International proved a tougher opponent than Alabama expected in the first half. However, the Tide pulled away with a 40–14 victory in the 2009 home opener. Alabama opened the scoring with a 23-yard Leigh Tiffin field goal followed by a 24-yard Greg McElroy touchdown pass to Mike McCoy, which gave Bama a 10–0 lead. FIU followed the McElroy touchdown with T. Y. Hilton returning the ensuing kickoff 96 yards, bringing the score to 10–7. Bama responded with a 29-yard Tiffin field goal to extend the lead to 13–7 early in the second quarter; the following kickoff was booted out of bounds, which set up the Golden Panthers at the 40. The ensuing 60-yard drive resulted in a 9-yard Paul McCall touchdown pass to Greg Ellingson that gave FIU a 14–13 lead. Bama responded with a 64-yard drive culminating with a two-yard Mark Ingram II touchdown run to put Bama up 20–14 at the half.

Trent Richardson continued the Alabama scoring in the third quarter with a nine-yard touchdown run to extend the lead to 26–14. A 46-yard punt return by Javier Arenas set up Richardson's second score on a 35-yard touchdown run on the first play of the fourth quarter. Alabama led 33–14. Terry Grant scored the Tide's final points with a 42-yard touchdown run to bring the final score to 40–14. Alabama outgained FIU 516–214 in total offense and 275–1 in rushing offense. Greg McElroy set an all-time Alabama record by completing 14 consecutive pass attempts and was 18–24 for 241 yards and a touchdown. For his 113-yard, two-touchdown rushing performance, Richardson was named the SEC Freshman of the Week. The victory improved Alabama's all-time record against the Golden Panthers to 2–0.

=== North Texas ===
| Team | 1 | 2 | 3 | 4 | Total |
|---|---|---|---|---|---|
| North Texas | 0 | 0 | 7 | 0 | 7 |
| • #4 Alabama | 14 | 16 | 14 | 9 | 53 |

- Location: Tuscaloosa, Alabama
- Game start: 11:21 a.m.
- Elapsed time: 2:52
- Game attendance: 92,012
- Game weather: Cloudy with rain, 77, Wind: 8mph from SE
- Referee: Hubert Owens
- TV announcers (SEC Network): Dave Neal (play-by-play), Andre Ware (color), Cara Capuano (sideline)

Alabama's second consecutive matchup with a Sun Belt opponent on the season resulted in its second consecutive victory, as the Tide defeated the North Texas Mean Green 53–7. Greg McElroy opened the scoring with a two-yard touchdown run followed by a 34-yard touchdown pass to Marquis Maze to take a 14–0 first quarter lead. The Tide continued the scoring in the second quarter, with touchdowns on a one-yard Trent Richardson run and a 29-yard McElroy pass to Mark Ingram II followed with a 35-yard Leigh Tiffin field goal. This gave Alabama a 30–0 lead at the half. In the third quarter, Bama extended their lead to 44–0 following touchdown runs of five and one yard respectively from Ingram and Terry Grant. After North Texas reached the end zone on a 34-yard Nathan Tune touchdown pass to Lance Dunbar, Alabama closed the game with ten fourth-quarter points on a 20-yard Tiffin field goal and 9-yard Grant touchdown run.

Alabama outgained the Mean Green 523–187 in yards of total offense. It was the most points for Alabama in a game since beating Texas-El Paso 56–7 in 2001 and the most scored at Bryant–Denny since defeating Tulane 62–0 in 1991. By completing of 13 of 15 passes, McElroy tied a school record with an overall completion percentage of 86.7. The game was notable for McElroy as the North Texas head coach, Todd Dodge, was his high school head coach when McElroy led Southlake Carroll to the 2005 Texas Class 5A high school football championship. The victory improved Alabama's all-time record against the Mean Green to 3–0.

=== Arkansas ===
| Team | 1 | 2 | 3 | 4 | Total |
|---|---|---|---|---|---|
| Arkansas | 0 | 0 | 7 | 0 | 7 |
| • #3 Alabama | 0 | 14 | 14 | 7 | 35 |

- Location: Tuscaloosa, Alabama
- Game start: 2:30 p.m.
- Elapsed time: 3:23
- Game attendance: 92,012
- Game weather: Cloudy with rain, 79, Wind: 6mph from NNW
- Referee: Tom Ritter
- TV announcers (CBS): Verne Lundquist (play-by-play), Gary Danielson (color), Tracy Wolfson (sideline)

In Bobby Petrino's first visit to Tuscaloosa as a head coach, Alabama opened conference play by defeating the Arkansas Razorbacks 35–7. After a scoreless first quarter, two big touchdown plays, a 52-yard run by Trent Richardson and a 50-yard pass from Greg McElroy to Julio Jones, had the Tide up 14–0 at the half. Arkansas responded early in the third quarter and cut the lead to 14–7 after Ryan Mallett hit Greg Childs for an 18-yard touchdown reception; the Hogs would not reach the end zone again as the Tide responded with three unanswered touchdowns. Bama scored first on an 80-yard touchdown pass from McElroy to Marquis Maze followed with two touchdowns by Mark Ingram II, one on a 14-yard pass from McElroy and one on a 2-yard run, bringing the final score to 35–7.

Alabama outgained the Razorbacks 425–254 in yards of total offense. McElroy threw for career highs of 291 yards and three touchdowns. For his 65-yard, nine-carry, one-touchdown performance, Richardson was named the SEC Freshman of the Week. The victory improved Alabama's all-time record against the Razorbacks to 10–8 (13–7 without NCAA vacations and forfeits).

=== Kentucky ===
| Team | 1 | 2 | 3 | 4 | Total |
|---|---|---|---|---|---|
| • #3 Alabama | 7 | 14 | 17 | 0 | 38 |
| Kentucky | 6 | 0 | 7 | 7 | 20 |

- Location: Lexington, Kentucky
- Game start: 12:21 p.m.
- Elapsed time: 3:08
- Game attendance: 70,967
- Game weather: Sunny, 65, Winds: 15 to 25 mph
- Referee: Ken Williamson
- TV announcers (SEC Network): Dave Neal (play-by-play), Andre Ware (color), Cara Capuano (sideline)

In Alabama's first trip to Lexington since 2004, and their first road game of the 2009 season, the Tide defeated the Kentucky Wildcats 38–20. Alabama scored on their opening drive after Javier Arenas returned the opening kickoff 60 yards, which set up an 11-yard Mark Ingram touchdown for an early 7–0 lead. Kentucky responded with a pair of 49-yard Lones Seiber field goals. The score was 7–6 at the end of the first quarter. The Tide extended their lead late in the second quarter following a nearly seven-minute, 13-play, 97-yard touchdown drive. Greg McElroy passes of 27 and 21 yards and a 13-yard run by Ingram moved Bama down the field, culminating with a three-yard touchdown pass from McElroy to Colin Peek to put the Tide up 14–6. With only 40 seconds remaining in the half, Kentucky tailback Derrick Locke fumbled the ball after catching a short pass. Courtney Upshaw returned 45 yards for an Alabama touchdown that put the Tide ahead 21–6 at halftime.

On the second play of the third quarter, Rolando McClain intercepted a Mike Hartline pass, giving Alabama possession at the Wildcat 38. Two plays later Ingram scored on a 32-yard run, making the score 28–6. Following an Eryk Anders interception that set up a 36-yard Leigh Tiffin field goal, the Wildcats reached the end zone for the first time on the ensuing drive. Hartline connected with Randall Cobb for a 45-yard touchdown reception in bringing the score to 31–13. The Tide responded with a 7-yard Darius Hanks touchdown reception to complete a 13-play, 76-yard drive. Kentucky scored the afternoon's final points in the fourth quarter on a two-yard Alfonso Smith touchdown run. The final score was 38–20. Kentucky's four turnovers sabotaged an effort that was better than any other of Alabama's previous opponents, as the Wildcats gained 301 yards in total offense and held Alabama to 352. McElroy threw for two touchdowns, giving him nine on the season against only one interception, and Ingram rushed for 140 yards on 22 carries. For his 12 tackles (8 solo), one interception, one forced fumble and one pass break-up, McClain was named both the SEC Defensive Player of the Week and the Bronko Nagurski Award National Defensive Player of the Week. The victory improved Alabama's all-time record against the Wildcats to 35–2–1.

=== Ole Miss ===
| Team | 1 | 2 | 3 | 4 | Total |
|---|---|---|---|---|---|
| • #3 Alabama | 3 | 13 | 3 | 3 | 22 |
| #20 Ole Miss | 0 | 0 | 3 | 0 | 3 |

- Location: Oxford, Mississippi
- Game start: 2:30 p.m.
- Elapsed time: 3:27
- Game attendance: 62,657
- Game weather: Cloudy, 54 Degrees
- Referee: Tom Ritter
- TV announcers (CBS): Craig Bolerjack (play-by-play), Steve Beuerlein (color)

Before the largest crowd to ever witness a game in Vaught–Hemingway Stadium, Alabama defeated their long-time rival, the Ole Miss Rebels, 22–3. Alabama struggled to put the ball in the end zone all afternoon with drives stalled at the Mississippi 8, 4, 4, 4, and 13. Each of those drives resulted in a field goal by Leigh Tiffin, who was 5 for 5 on the day. Other special teams contributions included a blocked punt in the second quarter and a recovered Dexter McCluster fumble on a punt return in the third quarter, both by Cory Reamer. McElroy struggled, completing only 15 of 34 passes for 147 yards, but Mark Ingram II ran for a then career-high 172 yards and accounted for Alabama's only touchdown on a 36-yard run in the second quarter.

The Alabama defense had an excellent day, with Javier Arenas, Kareem Jackson, Rolando McClain, and Cory Reamer each intercepting a Jevan Snead pass. Overall, the Tide held the Rebels to 212 yards of total offense and a single Joshua Shene field goal in the third quarter. center William Vlachos was named the SEC Offensive Lineman of the Week and Tiffin was named the Lou Groza Award "Star of Stars" for his five field goal performance. It was the team's sixth consecutive victory over the Rebels and improved Alabama's all-time record against Ole Miss to 43–9–2.

=== South Carolina ===
| Team | 1 | 2 | 3 | 4 | Total |
|---|---|---|---|---|---|
| #22 South Carolina | 0 | 6 | 0 | 0 | 6 |
| • #2 Alabama | 10 | 3 | 0 | 7 | 20 |

- Location: Tuscaloosa, Alabama
- Game start: 6:45 p.m.
- Elapsed time: 3:19
- Game attendance: 92,012
- Game weather: Partly Cloudy, 48, Wind: 6 to 12 mph from NW
- Referee: Hubert Owens
- TV announcers (ESPN): Brad Nessler (play-by-play), Todd Blackledge (color), Erin Andrews (sideline)

In South Carolina's first trip to Bryant–Denny since 2004, the Tide defeated the South Carolina Gamecocks 20–6 on homecoming in Tuscaloosa. On the second play from the start of the game, Mark Barron intercepted a Stephen Garcia pass and returned it 77 yards for a touchdown and a 7–0 Alabama lead. Greg McElroy struggled; he threw a pair of first-quarter interceptions on Bama's first two offensive possessions. South Carolina's C.C. Whitlock fumbled the ball on the return of the second interception and possession was recovered by Darius Hanks. The Tide continued its drive to the Gamecock 8, and Leigh Tiffin kicked a field goal to put Alabama ahead 10–0.

Following a failed 49-yard Leigh Tiffin field goal attempt in the second quarter, South Carolina answered by driving to the Alabama five-yard line. However, the Bama defense held the Gamecock offense to three consecutive incompletions; the result was a 22-yard Spencer Lanning field goal to make the score 10–3. On the following possession, Mark Ingram II ran 54 yards to the South Carolina 28. The drive stalled at the 17 and Tiffin's field goal made it 13–3. South Carolina responded with a quick drive that ended with a 31-yard Lanning field goal as time expired in the first half with the score 13–6.

After a scoreless third quarter, with 8:08 to go, Alabama took possession at its own 32 following a Gamecock punt. Taking direct snaps out of the wildcat formation, Ingram rushed for 64 yards on five carries, then took a pitch from Greg McElroy for the last four yards and the touchdown, sealing Alabama's 20–6 victory. The Alabama offense turned the ball over four times in this game after committing only two turnovers in the first six games. Mark Ingram's 246 yards rushing marked his third consecutive career-high effort and the third highest single game total in Alabama history. For their performances, Ingram was named the SEC Offensive Player of the Week and Rolando McClain was named the Lott Trophy IMPACT Player of the Week. The victory improved Alabama's all-time record against the Gamecocks to 10–3 (12–2 before NCAA vacations and forfeits).

=== Tennessee ===
Third Saturday in October

| Team | 1 | 2 | 3 | 4 | Total |
|---|---|---|---|---|---|
| Tennessee | 0 | 3 | 0 | 7 | 10 |
| • #1 Alabama | 3 | 6 | 0 | 3 | 12 |

- Location: Tuscaloosa, Alabama
- Game start: 2:30 p.m.
- Elapsed time: 3:17
- Game attendance: 92,012
- Game weather: Partly Cloudy, 61; Wind: 7 WNW
- Referee: Matt Austin
- TV announcers (CBS): Verne Lundquist (play-by-play), Gary Danielson (color), Tracy Wolfson (sideline)

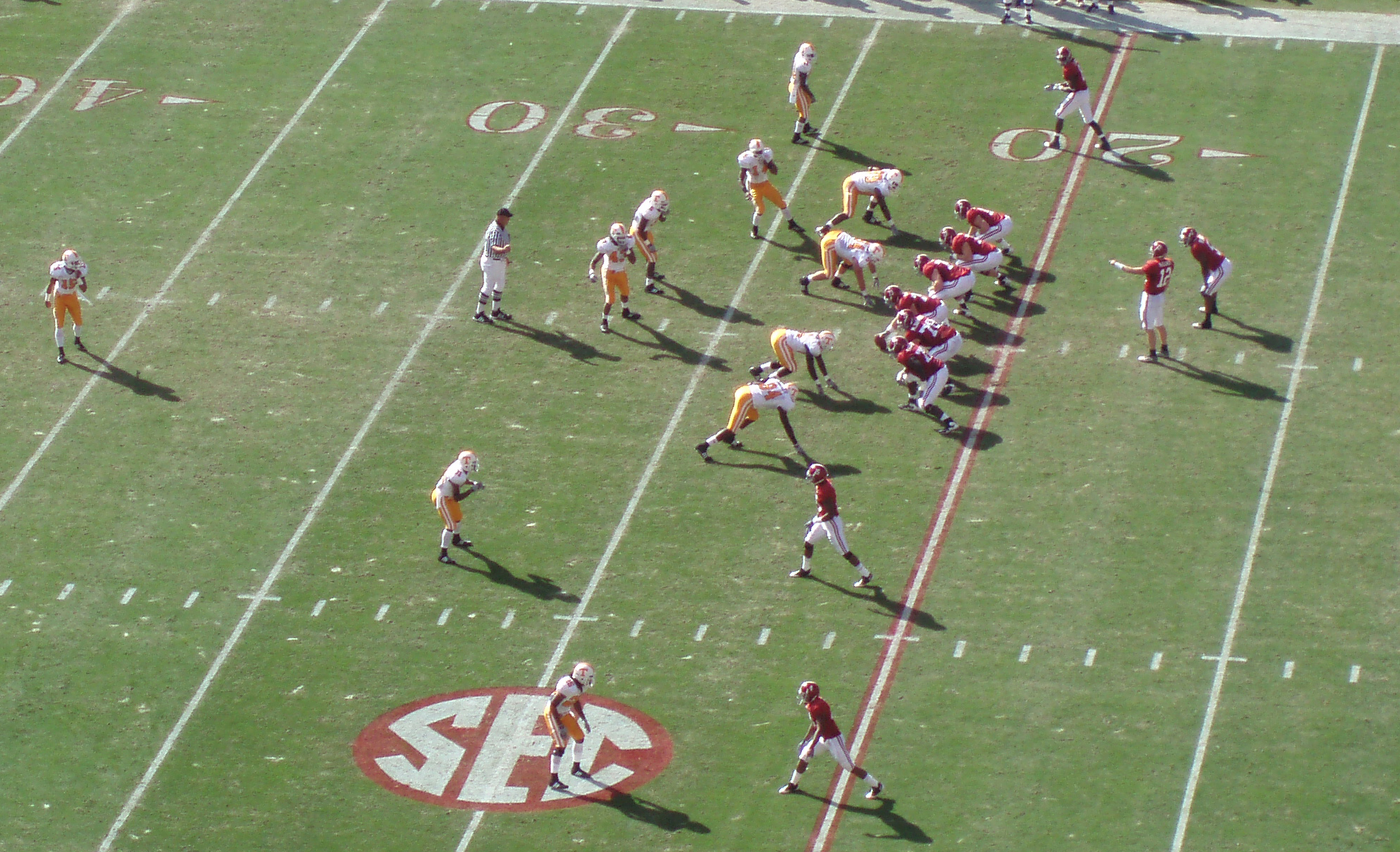
Alabama won the game, despite not getting a touchdown.

This edition of the Third Saturday in October was a defensive struggle with a surprise finish as the Crimson Tide defeated the Tennessee Volunteers 12–10. In a defensive struggle for both teams, Leigh Tiffin was 4 for 4 on field goals and accounted for all of Alabama's scoring.

With the Tennessee defense stopping the Tide on consecutive drives, Alabama's defense responded with Mark Barron intercepting a Jonathan Crompton pass at the Bama 19 in the first quarter. The ensuing drive resulted in a 38-yard Leigh Tiffin field goal and a 3–0 lead. The Vols responded with a 24-yard Daniel Lincoln field goal that tied the game 3–3. Tiffin hit field goals of 50 and 22 yards before Lincoln missed a 47-yard attempt at the end of the first half just short, leaving the score 9–3 at halftime. After a scoreless third, in the fourth Tennessee drove to the Alabama 27, but Terrence Cody blocked Lincoln's field goal. On the ensuing possession, Tiffin hit a 49-yard field goal to bring the score to 12–3.

Late in the fourth, Mark Ingram II lost a fumble for the first time in his collegiate career, giving Tennessee possession at the Alabama 43 with 3:29 remaining in the game. The Vols drove the ball 43 yards in 2:10, culminating with an 11-yard Crompton touchdown pass to Gerald Jones to cut the gap to 12–10. The Vols followed with a successful onside kick attempt and regained possession of the ball at their own 41-yard line. After Tennessee was penalized five yards for a false start, Crompton completed a pass to Luke Stocker for 23 yards, to the Bama 27-yard line. With the clock ticking off the final seconds and Tennessee out of time outs, Crompton spiked the ball to stop the clock with four seconds left. This set up Lincoln for a 45-yard field goal attempt to win the game. However, Terrence Cody knocked his blocker over and broke through the line. He blocked Lincoln's field goal as time expired, preserving Alabama's 12–10 victory and perfect season. For their performances, Cody was named the SEC Defensive Lineman of the Week and Tiffin was named the SEC Special Teams Player of the Week.

=== LSU ===
| Team | 1 | 2 | 3 | 4 | Total |
|---|---|---|---|---|---|
| #9 LSU | 0 | 7 | 8 | 0 | 15 |
| • #3 Alabama | 0 | 3 | 7 | 14 | 24 |

- Location: Tuscaloosa, Alabama
- Game start: 2:30 p.m.
- Elapsed time: 3:32
- Game attendance: 92,012
- Game weather: Sunny, 73 degrees
- Referee: Tom Ritter
- TV announcers (CBS): Verne Lundquist (play-by-play), Gary Danielson (color), Tracy Wolfson (sideline)

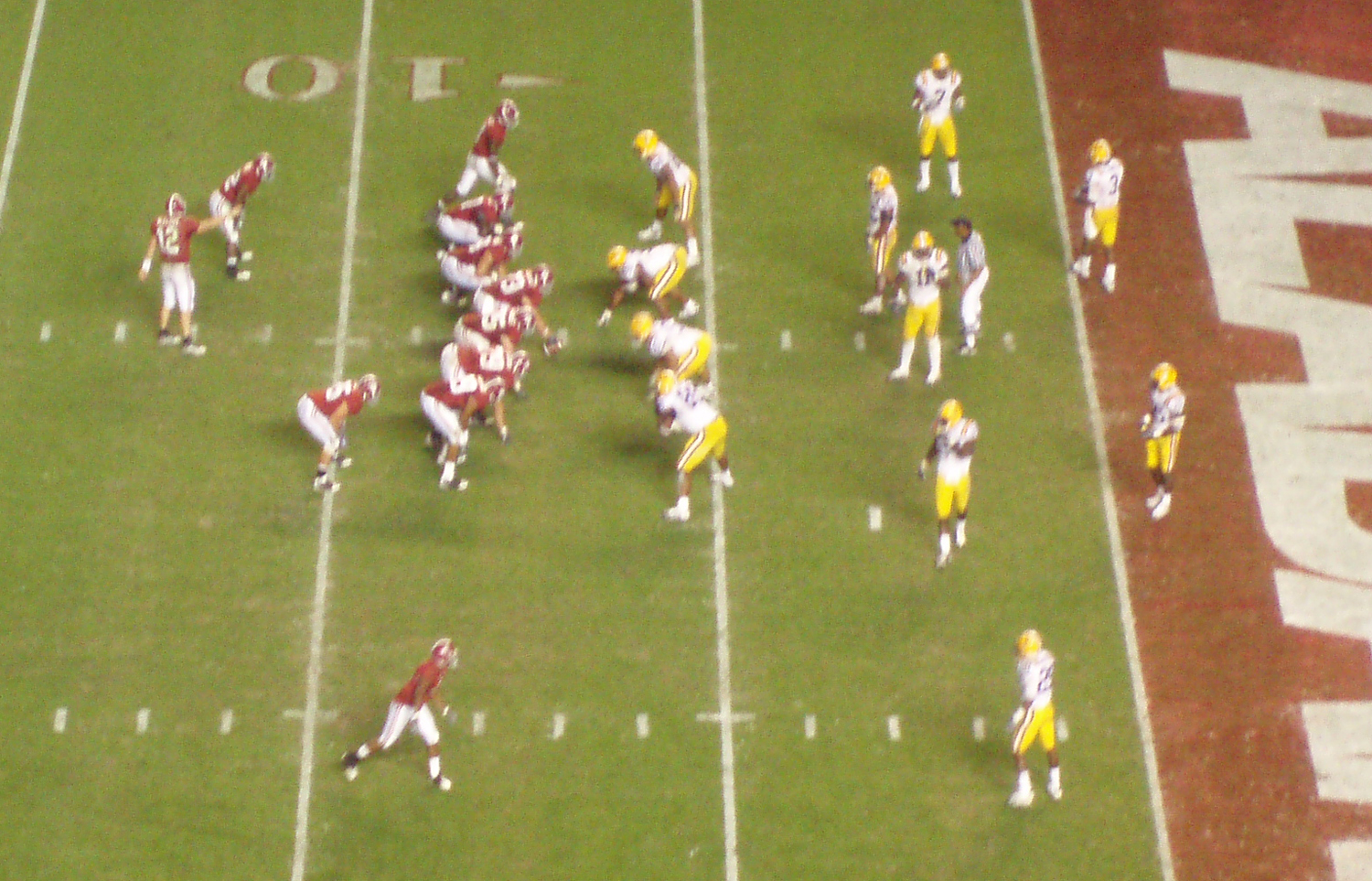
Alabama's offense failed to score a touchdown in the red zone.

With the SEC West divisional championship on the line, Alabama defeated their long-time rival the LSU Tigers 24–15 to secure a spot in the SEC Championship Game. Following a scoreless first quarter, LSU took possession on its own 9 on the last play of the first quarter and embarked on a 13-play, 91-yard drive that ended in a 12-yard touchdown pass from Jordan Jefferson to Deangelo Peterson and a 7–0 lead. Javier Arenas returned the ensuing punt 40 yards to the Alabama 49, and the Tide drove to the LSU 11 before settling for a 28-yard Leigh Tiffin field goal that made the score 7–3. Neither team could mount a sustained drive for the rest of the half.

At the start of the second half Alabama received the kickoff, took possession at its own 19, and started getting the ball to Mark Ingram II. On the drive, Ingram was responsible for a 12-yard reception from Greg McElroy and rushes of 4, 12, 12, and 18 yards that advanced the ball to the Tiger 23. Two plays later, McElroy hit Darius Hanks for his first touchdown pass since the Kentucky game, and Alabama was up 10–7. The ensuing LSU drive stalled at the Tide 46. The LSU punt was downed at the Alabama 1-yard line. Two plays later McElroy was sacked for a safety, making the score 10–9. LSU returned the free kick to its own 41 and drove 59 yards for the touchdown, the big play coming on a 34-yard run by Charles Scott. The two-point conversion attempt failed, leaving the score 15–10 in favor of LSU.

Alabama received the kickoff and again relied on Ingram: seven Ingram rushes for 48 yards accounted for most of the offense on a drive that ended with a 20-yard Tiffin field goal, making the score 15–13. Following a LSU three and out, Alabama took possession on its own 27-yard line. On first down, McElroy completed a screen pass to Julio Jones which Jones turned into a 73-yard touchdown. After a successful two-point conversion, Alabama led 21–15. LSU went three and out again. A methodical 11-play, 31-yard Alabama drive consumed 6:14 of game time and ended in a 40-yard Tiffin field goal with 3:04 left to seal a 24–15 Alabama victory. Alabama won the SEC Western Division championship and clinched a berth in the SEC Championship Game against Florida, which clinched the East that same day with a 27–3 victory over Vanderbilt. Ingram rushed for 144 yards and Jones had 102 receiving yards. The victory improved Alabama's all-time record against the Tigers to 45–23–5.

=== Mississippi State ===
| Team | 1 | 2 | 3 | 4 | Total |
|---|---|---|---|---|---|
| • #3 Alabama | 0 | 14 | 3 | 14 | 31 |
| Mississippi State | 0 | 0 | 0 | 3 | 3 |

- Location: Starkville, Mississippi
- Game start: 6:00 p.m.
- Elapsed time: 3:05
- Game attendance: 58,103
- Game weather: Clear Skies, 60 degrees
- Referee: Matt Moore
- TV announcers (ESPN): Brad Nessler (play-by-play), Todd Blackledge (color), Erin Andrews (sideline)

Playing in front of the largest crowd to ever witness a game in Davis Wade Stadium, and with the Bulldogs wearing black jerseys for the first time in their history, Alabama cruised to a 31–3 victory over long-time rival Mississippi State. After a scoreless first quarter, Alabama scored a pair of touchdowns in the second to take a 14–0 lead. The first touchdown came on a 45-yard Darius Hanks reception from Greg McElroy and the second on a 1-yard Mark Ingram run.

After a 39-yard field goal by Leigh Tiffin extended the lead to 17–0 in the third, the Bulldogs scored their only points of the night on a 34-yard Derek DePasquale field goal. On the ensuing kickoff, Javier Arenas returned the ball 46 yards and on the next play, McElroy hit Julio Jones for a 48-yard touchdown reception. The score was 24–3. Mark Barron intercepted a Tyson Lee pass at the Alabama 30 on the next Bulldog offensive series. On the following play, Ingram scored a touchdown on a 70-yard run to bring the final score to 31–3.

For the game, McElroy threw for 192 yards and two touchdowns on 13 of 18 passing, and Mark Ingram II rushed for 149 yards two touchdowns. Mississippi State was held to 213 total yards, with Barron intercepting two Tyson Lee and Marquis Johnson intercepting one Chris Relf pass. For his performance, left guard Mike Johnson was named the SEC Offensive Lineman of the Week. The victory improved Alabama's all-time record against the Bulldogs to 73–18–3 (72–19–3 without NCAA vacations and forfeits).

=== Chattanooga ===
| Team | 1 | 2 | 3 | 4 | Total |
|---|---|---|---|---|---|
| Chattanooga | 0 | 0 | 0 | 0 | 0 |
| • #2 Alabama | 21 | 14 | 3 | 7 | 45 |

- Location: Tuscaloosa, Alabama
- Game start: 11:21 a.m.
- Elapsed time: 2:53
- Game attendance: 92,012
- Game weather: Partly Cloudy, 59 degrees
- Referee: Marc Curles
- TV announcers (SEC Network): Doug Bell (play-by-play), Chris Doering (color)

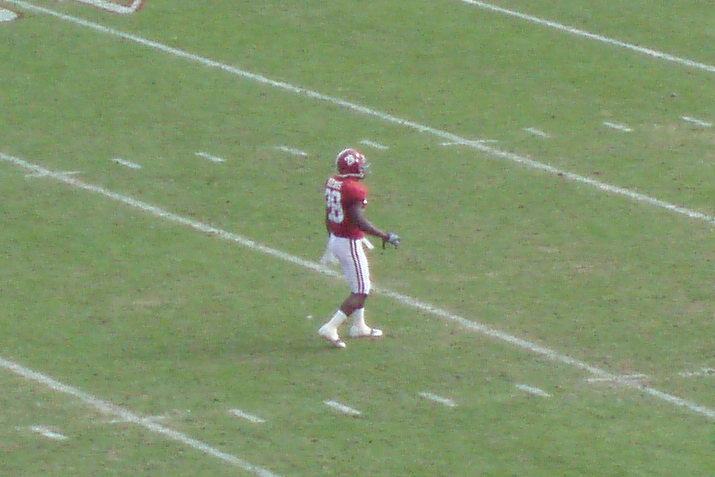
Javier Arenas returned a kickoff for touchdown in the second quarter.

On senior day in Tuscaloosa, Alabama dipped down to college football's Football Championship Subdivision and defeated the Mocs of UT-Chattanooga 45–0. After being stopped on their first possession, Alabama reached the end zone on the next five consecutive possessions in running up a 35–0 lead in the first half. First-quarter touchdowns included a 2-yard Trent Richardson run, a 25-yard Mark Ingram II run, and a 19-yard Julio Jones reception from Greg McElroy. In the second quarter, touchdowns were scored by Javier Arenas on a 66-yard punt return and on a 40-yard Ingram run. With the only third quarter points coming on a 41-yard Leigh Tiffin field goal, Bama's final points of the afternoon came on a 21-yard Roy Upchurch touchdown run in the fourth.

Javier Arenas set the all-time SEC record with his seventh punt return for a touchdown and was named the SEC Special Teams Player of the Week. Mark Ingram II led the offense with 102 yards and two touchdowns before being pulled early in the second quarter. Alabama outgained Chattanooga in total offense 422–84 and recorded their first defensive shutout since defeating Auburn 36–0 in 2008. The victory improved Alabama's all-time record against the Mocs to 11–0.

=== Auburn ===
Iron Bowl

| Team | 1 | 2 | 3 | 4 | Total |
|---|---|---|---|---|---|
| • #2 Alabama | 0 | 14 | 6 | 6 | 26 |
| Auburn | 14 | 0 | 7 | 0 | 21 |

- Location: Auburn, Alabama
- Game start: 1:30 p.m.
- Elapsed time: 3:19
- Game attendance: 87,451
- Game weather: Sunny, 57 degrees
- Referee: Penn Wagers
- TV announcers (CBS): Craig Bolerjack (play-by-play), Steve Beuerlein (color)

One year after Alabama's 36–0 victory in Tuscaloosa, the 2009 Iron Bowl contest against the Auburn Tigers ended with a 26–21 Tide victory and a 12–0 regular season. The Tigers, who entered the game 7–4 and unranked, took the ball after Alabama's initial three and out and struck quickly. On Auburn's fourth play from scrimmage, Terrell Zachery raced 67 yards on a reverse for a touchdown and a 7–0 Auburn lead. The run was the longest allowed by the Tide since a 70-yard run by Arkansas' Darren McFadden in 2005. Auburn then successfully executed an onside kick and retained possession of the ball. After the onside kick, Auburn drove 58 yards in 12 plays, scoring on a 1-yard touchdown pass from Chris Todd to Eric Smith. The Crimson Tide, which had never trailed in a game by more than seven points all season, found itself down 14–0 before the first quarter was over.

Early in the second quarter Alabama completed a 10-play, 58-yard drive by scoring on a two-yard run by backup tailback Trent Richardson. The key plays were a 15-yard pass from McElroy to Darius Hanks and a 13-yard pass from McElroy to Richardson. After an exchange of punts gave Alabama good starting position at the Auburn 45, the Tide quickly struck again with McElroy hitting tight end Colin Peek on a 33-yard touchdown pass that left the game tied 14–14 at halftime.

In the third quarter, Auburn scored on another quick strike. The Tigers took possession on their 24 after a Bama punt; Kodi Burns rushed for four yards, and then Todd hit Darvin Adams on a 72-yard completion that put Auburn back in front 21–14. The completion marked the longest play from scrimmage allowed by the Bama defense all season and the longest pass play since 1999. Javier Arenas gave Alabama an opportunity by returning the ensuing kickoff 46 yards to the Auburn 45, but Mark Ingram, who struggled the entire game, rushed for 7 yards and 2 yards and then was held for no gain on both third and one and fourth and one, and Alabama turned the ball over on downs. Auburn went three and out and punted, and Arenas set the Tide up again, returning the punt 56 yards to the Auburn 33-yard line. Alabama drove to the Auburn 10 before settling for a Leigh Tiffin field goal that cut the deficit to 21–17. Alabama kicked off and two plays later, Auburn quarterback Todd threw an interception that gave Alabama possession at the Auburn 43. The Tide drove to the Tigers' 13 before this drive also stalled, forcing another Leigh Tiffin field goal that made the score 21–20. As the third quarter ended, Auburn continued to hang on to a one-point lead.

Neither team could make progress with possessions early in the fourth quarter, and after an exchange of punts, Alabama got the ball on its own 21 with 8:27 to go, and began what would soon be known as "The Drive". Richardson opened with a 7-yard rush, and on third and three, McElroy completed a nine-yard pass to Julio Jones for a first down. Three plays later, on third and five, McElroy completed a six-yard pass to Jones for another first down and advancing the ball to the Tide 48. Two plays later, on second and eight, a third pass from McElroy to Jones for 11 yards led to a third first down. Two plays after that, a fourth pass from McElroy to Jones and a fourth first down at the Auburn 28-yard line. On second and nine at the Auburn 27, McElroy chose a different target, hitting Richardson for a first down to the Auburn 11-yard line. After a four-yard run by Richardson to the Auburn 7, the Tigers called time out with 1:34 left. Richardson took the ball three more yards to the Auburn 4, leaving the Tide at third and three. Each team called a time out in succession with 1:29 left. Alabama's offensive coaches called for a running play, but head coach Nick Saban, unwilling to settle for a field goal, overruled this decision and demanded a pass. McElroy completed a 4-yard touchdown pass to third-string tailback Roy Upchurch, giving Alabama a 26–21 lead with 1:24 to go. McElroy had completed seven consecutive passes on The Drive after missing his first.

A two-point conversion attempt failed and the lead was five points. Auburn took possession at the 25 following the kickoff and took 1:14 to run four plays and advance the ball to its own 46 with ten seconds to go. Todd completed a 17-yard pass to Darvin Adams at the Alabama 37, and after spiking the ball, Todd's last pass fell incomplete and the game was over. Alabama had survived, beating Auburn 26–21 despite being outgained 332 yards to 291 and being held to only 73 yards rushing.

=== Florida—SEC Championship Game ===
SEC Championship Game

| Team | 1 | 2 | 3 | 4 | Total |
|---|---|---|---|---|---|
| #1 Florida | 3 | 10 | 0 | 0 | 13 |
| • #2 Alabama | 9 | 10 | 7 | 6 | 32 |

- Location: Atlanta, Georgia
- Game start: 4:10 p.m.
- Elapsed time: 3:27
- Game attendance: 74,954
- Game weather: Indoors
- Referee: Matt Austin
- TV announcers (CBS): Verne Lundquist (play-by-play), Gary Danielson (color), Tracy Wolfson (sideline)

Alabama faced Florida in the SEC Championship Game in a rematch of the 2008 contest, with the Tide capturing their 22nd conference championship following their 32–13 victory over the Gators. The Tide struck first, driving 47 yards with the opening possession before Leigh Tiffin kicked a 48-yard field goal and a 3–0 lead. Following a Florida three and out on their first possession, Alabama responded with an 8-play, 76-yard touchdown drive. On the drive, Greg McElroy completed key passes to Colin Peek and Marquis Maze and Mark Ingram II rushed for 37 yards and the touchdown in taking a 9–0 lead following a missed extra point. On the ensuing possession, Caleb Sturgis hit a 48-yard field goal that made the score 9–3 at the end of the first quarter.

Alabama scored first in the second quarter on a 34-yard Tiffin field goal to complete a 68-yard drive and extend the Bama lead to 12–3. Florida followed with what turned out to be its only touchdown drive of the game. Rushes of 23 yards and 15 yards from quarterback and former Heisman Trophy winner Tim Tebow were followed by a 23-yard touchdown pass from Tebow to David Nelson, and Florida had cut the lead to two, 12–10. On the next offensive play, Ingram took a short pass from McElroy and raced 69 yards to the Gator 3-yard line, and ran it in for a touchdown from three yards out on the next play. The Gators ended the first half with a 32-yard Sturgis field goal to make the halftime score 19–13.

Florida opened the third quarter with a three and out. On the Tide's first offensive series of the second half, McElroy completed a 28-yard pass to Maze and was followed with a 15-yard personal foul penalty in bringing the ball into the red zone. On the next play McElroy completed the drive with a 17-yard touchdown pass to tight end Colin Peek. Alabama took a 26–13 lead. Florida got one first down on its next possession before punting the ball to Alabama. Taking the ball at its own 12-yard line with 7:36 to go in the third quarter, Alabama held the ball for the rest of the quarter and into the fourth, using up 8:47 of game time on a 12-play, 88-yard drive. Ingram, who rushed for 37 yards on the drive, scored on a 1-yard touchdown run early in the fourth quarter to increase Bama's lead to 32–13. Florida mounted a late drive that reached the Alabama 6 before Tebow threw an interception to Javier Arenas in the end zone. On Florida's next possession, the Gators turned the ball over on downs at the Alabama 13, and the Tide was able to run out the clock to secure the 32–13 victory.

For his 239-yard, one touchdown passing performance, Greg McElroy was named the game's MVP. Ingram rushed for 113 and Trent Richardson rushed for 80 yards. The victory gave Alabama its 22nd SEC title, their third since the inception of the Championship Game and their first in ten years—the longest time the Crimson Tide program has ever gone without an SEC championship. The victory improved Alabama's all-time record against the Gators to 20–14 (21–14 without the NCAA vacation of the 2005 victory). Alabama earned it third SEC championship since the inception of the SEC Championship Game in 1992 and 22nd SEC title overall.

=== Texas—BCS National Championship Game ===
BCS National Championship Game

| Team | 1 | 2 | 3 | 4 | Total |
|---|---|---|---|---|---|
| #2 Texas | 6 | 0 | 7 | 8 | 21 |
| • #1 Alabama | 0 | 24 | 0 | 13 | 37 |

- Location: Pasadena, California
- Game start: 5:39 p.m. (PST)
- Elapsed time: 3:28
- Game attendance: 94,906
- Game weather: Clear Skies, 63 degrees
- Referee: John McDaid
- TV announcers (ABC): Brent Musburger (play-by-play), Kirk Herbstreit (color), Tom Rinaldi & Lisa Salters (sidleine)

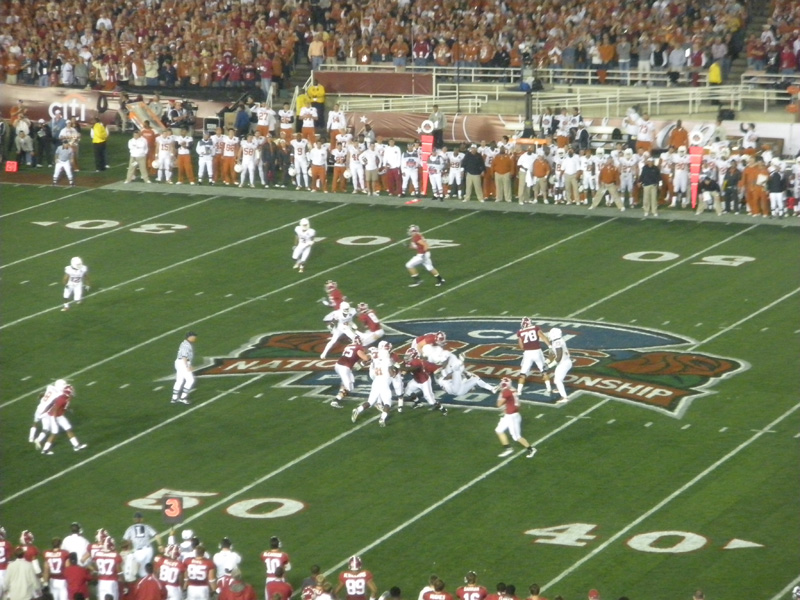
50-yard line action for the national championship

Following victories in their respective conference championship games, on December 6 the final Bowl Championship Series (BCS) standings were unveiled, pitting the No. 1 ranked Crimson Tide against the No. 2 ranked Texas Longhorns for the 2010 BCS National Championship. The game was held in the Rose Bowl, although it was not the actual Rose Bowl Game, in which Ohio State beat Oregon six days earlier. Alabama came into the game having never beaten Texas, compiling an all-time 0–7–1 record against the Longhorns.

Alabama won the toss and elected to receive the opening kickoff. After losing thirteen yards on a sack and a penalty, Nick Saban called for a fake punt, which resulted in a Texas interception by Blake Gideon at the Alabama 37-yard line. On the initial possession, Texas quarterback Colt McCoy suffered a hit from Marcell Dareus which forced him to leave the game. Suffering from a pinched nerve in his throwing shoulder, McCoy did not return. With McCoy out, freshman Garrett Gilbert replaced him at quarterback, and the Longhorns settled for a field goal and a 3–0 lead. The ensuing kickoff was an onside kick, and Texas retained possession of the ball when Alabama failed to field the kick. The Longhorns only advanced the ball five yards and Hunter Lawrence kicked another field goal to go ahead 6–0.

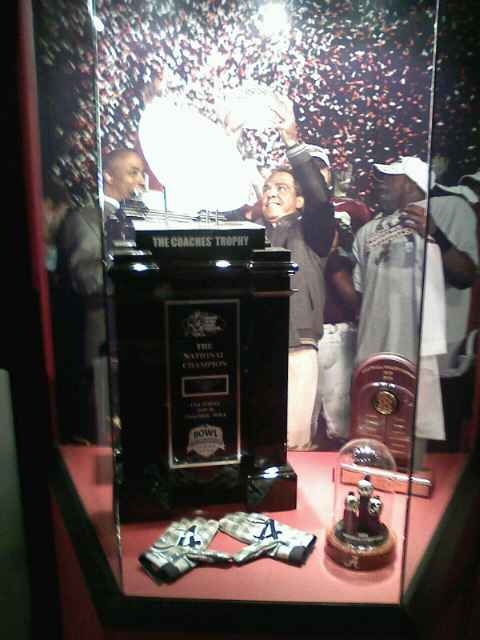
Coaches' Trophy on display at the Paul W. Bryant Museum

The Tide went ahead in the second quarter. Greg McElroy threw for only 58 yards on 6 of 11 passing for Alabama, but 23 of those yards came on a completion to Julio Jones that advanced the ball to the Texas 12. Three plays later Mark Ingram II ran it in from two yards out, and Alabama went ahead 7–6. After an exchange of punts, Bama took possession on the Texas 49-yard line, and on the second play Trent Richardson burst through a hole in the middle and raced 49 yards untouched for the touchdown, extending the lead to 14–6. Texas continued to struggle for offense in McCoy's absence, and on the next possession a Texas drive ended when Javier Arenas intercepted a Gilbert pass at the Alabama 25. Following a short punt late in the quarter, Bama drove to the Texas 9, and increased their lead to 17–6 following a successful 26-yard Leigh Tiffin field goal. It appeared that the Crimson Tide would go into the locker room leading 17–6. However, after gaining nine yards on a rush up the middle, Texas called time out with 15 seconds left. With the ball at the Texas 37, Gilbert threw a shovel pass to D.J. Monroe, who bobbled the ball and batted it into the arms of Alabama defensive lineman Marcell Dareus, who lumbered 28 yards for a touchdown that made the halftime score 24–6.

Having been sacked 4 times in the first half but had considerable success rushing the ball, Alabama came out rushing after halftime, attempting only two passes in the 3rd quarter. Meanwhile, Gilbert, who had struggled early in the game, started to find his rhythm, mostly due to the efforts of Jordan Shipley, one of only two Texas receivers to catch a pass thrown beyond the line of scrimmage in the game. A 44-yard touchdown pass from Gilbert to Shipley cut the lead to 24–13. Early in the fourth, Leigh Tiffin missed a 52-yard field goal. On the ensuing possession, the Longhorns drove 65 yards and scored another touchdown on a 28-yard Shipley reception. A successful two-point conversion pulled the score to within three points, 24–21. Following an Alabama punt, Texas gained possession on their own 7-yard line with 3:14 to go. On the second play of the drive, Eryk Anders laid a hit on Gilbert that forced a fumble, and Alabama recovered at the Texas 3. Three plays later Ingram, who rushed for 116 yards in the game, ran it in for the score that gave Alabama a 31–21 lead. On the following drive, Gilbert threw a second interception to Arenas, and a Trent Richardson touchdown with 47 seconds left made the final score 37–21.

For their performances, Mark Ingram II was named the game's offensive MVP and Marcell Dareus was named defensive MVP. Alabama beat Texas for the first time in their history, won its first ever BCS championship game, and won its first national championship since 1992. It was Alabama's thirteenth claimed and eighth national championship by vote of the AP poll or coaches' poll, the others coming in 1961, 1964, 1965, 1973, 1978, 1979, and 1992, and ninth perfect season, the others coming in 1925, 1930, 1934, 1945, 1961, 1966, 1979, and 1992. Alabama became the third school in major college history to go 14–0, joining the 2002 Ohio State Buckeyes and the 2009 Boise State Broncos.

== Personnel ==
=== Coaching staff ===
Prior to the 2009 season, Alabama made several changes to its coaching staff. Alabama lost their defensive head coach, Kevin Steele, on January 10, 2009, when he was hired as defensive coordinator for Clemson, and their linebacker coach Lance Thompson on January 16, when he was hired as linebacker coach by Tennessee. The following week, Saban named Sal Sunseri from the NFL's Carolina Panthers as his team's new assistant head and linebacker coach, and James Willis from Auburn as the new associate head and linebacker coach.

| Name | Position | Seasons at Alabama | Alma mater (year) |
|---|---|---|---|
| Nick Saban | Head coach | 3 | Kent State (1973) |
| Burton Burns | Associate head coach, Running Backs | 3 | Nebraska (1976) |
| Curt Cignetti | Receivers, Recruiting Coordinator | 3 | West Virginia (1983) |
| Bo Davis | Defensive Line | 3 | LSU (1993) |
| Jim McElwain | Offensive coordinator, Quarterbacks | 2 | Eastern Washington (1984) |
| Joe Pendry | Assistant head coach, Offensive Line | 3 | West Virginia (1969) |
| Kirby Smart | Defensive coordinator, Secondary | 3 | Georgia (1999) |
| Sal Sunseri | Assistant head coach, Linebackers | 1 | Pittsburgh (1982) |
| Bobby Williams | Tight Ends, Special Teams | 2 | Purdue (1982) |
| James Willis | Associate head coach, Outside Linebackers | 1 | Auburn (1992) |
| Scott Cochran | Strength and Conditioning | 3 | LSU (2001) |

=== Roster ===
2009 Alabama Crimson Tide football team roster
Players
Coaches
Offense

| Pos. | # | Name | Class |
|---|---|---|---|
| WR | 82 | Earl Alexander | Jr |
| WR | 7 | Kenny Bell | Fr |
| TE | 86 | Undra Billingsley | Fr |
| OL | 67 | John Michael Boswell | So |
| WR | 88 | Michael Bowman | Fr |
| OL | 77 | James Carpenter | Jr |
| QB | 16 | Thomas Darrah | So |
| OL | 79 | Drew Davis | Sr |
| TE | 85 | Preston Dial | Jr |
| WR | 13 | Rob Ezell | Jr |
| RB | 22 | Mark Ingram II | So |
| WR | 8 | Julio Jones | So |
| RB | 42 | Eddie Lacy | Fr |
| QB | 12 | Greg McElroy | Jr |
| RB | 3 | Trent Richardson | Fr |
| OL | 60 | David Williams | Fr |
| OL | 63 | Kellen Williams | Fr |
| TE | 89 | Michael Williams | Fr |
| WR | 9 | Nick Williams | Fr |

Defense

| Pos. | # | Name | Class |
|---|---|---|---|
| LB | 32 | Eryk Anders | Sr |
| DB | 28 | Javier Arenas | Sr |
| LB | 49 | Jonathan Atchison | Fr |
| DB | 4 | Mark Barron | So |
| LB | 44 | Alex Benson | Sr |
| DL | 93 | Chris Bonds | Fr |
| LB | 87 | Drew Bullard | So |
| DL | 99 | Josh Chapman | So |
| DL | 62 | Terrence Cody | Sr |
| DL | 57 | Marcell Dareus | So |
| DL | 96 | Luther Davis | Jr |
| DL | 95 | Brandon Deaderick | Sr |
| LB | 51 | Michael DeJohn | Jr |
| LB | 40 | DeMarcus DuBose | So |
| DL | 54 | Glenn Harbin | So |
| LB | 10 | Jerrell Harris | So |
| LB | 30 | Dont'a Hightower | So |
| DB | 3 | Kareem Jackson | Jr |
| LB | 25 | Rolando McClain | Jr |

Special teams

| Pos. | # | Name | Class |
|---|---|---|---|
| P | 7 | P. J. Fitzgerald | Sr |

Head coach

- Nick Saban

Coordinators/assistant coaches

Legend

- (C) Team captain
- (S) Suspended
- (I) Ineligible
- Injured
- Redshirt

Roster

=== Depth chart ===
Starters and backups.

Defense

FS
Justin Woodall
Robby Green
Tyrone King

| WLB | ILB | ILB | SLB |
|---|---|---|---|
| Cory Reamer | Rolando McClain | Dont'a Hightower | Eryk Anders |
| Alex Watkins | Chris Jordan | Jerrell Harris | Courtney Upshaw |
| Chavis Williams | Nico Johnson | Tana Patrick | Damion Square |

SS
Mark Barron
Ali Sharrief
Rod Woodson

CB
Kareem Jackson
Chris Rogers
Dre Kirkpatrick

| DE | NT | DE |
|---|---|---|
| Brandon Deaderick | Terrence Cody | Lorenzo Washington |
| Luther Davis | Josh Chapman | Marcell Dareus |
| Darrington Sentimore | Kerry Murphy | Milton Talbert |

CB
Javier Arenas
Marquis Johnson
B. J. Scott

Offense

WR
Julio Jones
Mike McCoy
Brandon Gibson

| LT | LG | C | RG | RT |
|---|---|---|---|---|
| James Carpenter | Mike Johnson | William Vlachos | Barrett Jones | Drew Davis |
| Alfred McCullough | Brian Motley | David Ross | John Michael Boswell | Tyler Love |
| Taylor Pharr | Anthony Steen | ⋅ | Chance Warmack | D. J. Fluker |

TE
Colin Peek
Michael Williams
Undra Billingsley

WR
Marquis Maze
Darius Hanks
Earl Alexander

QB
Greg McElroy
Star Jackson
Thomas Darrah

RB
Mark Ingram II
Trent Richardson
Roy Upchurch

FB
Brad Smelley
Preston Dial
Baron Huber

Special teams
PK Leigh Tiffin
P P. J. Fitzgerald
KR Javier Arenas
PR Javier Arenas
LS Brian Selman

=== Recruiting class ===
Alabama's recruiting class was highlighted by seven players from the "ESPN 150": No. 4 Dre Kirkpatrick (CB); No. 6 Trent Richardson (RB); No. 12 D.J. Fluker (OT); No. 20 Nico Johnson (ILB); No. 36 A. J. McCarron (QB); No. 65 Kendall Kelly (WR); No. 110 Tana Patrick (OLB); No. 142 Petey Smith (ILB); and No. 143 Eddie Lacy (RB). Alabama signed the No. 1 recruiting class according to Rivals and the No. 2 recruiting class according to Scout. The football program received 29 letters of intent on National Signing Day, February 4, 2009.

College recruiting
| Name | Hometown | School | Height | Weight | 40^{‡} | Commit date |
|---|---|---|---|---|---|---|
| Jonathan Atchison; LB | Atlanta, Georgia | Douglass High School | 6 ft 3 in (1.91 m) | 216 lb (98 kg) | 4.54 | Dec 5, 2008 |
| Jonathan Atchison; LB | Recruit ratings: Scout: Rivals: 247Sports: (80) | | | | | |
| Kenny Bell; WR | Rayville, Louisiana | Rayville High School | 6 ft 1 in (1.85 m) | 160 lb (73 kg) | | Feb 4, 2009 |
| Kenny Bell; WR | Recruit ratings: Scout: Rivals: 247Sports: (78) | | | | | |
| Chris Bonds; DT | Columbia, South Carolina | Richland Northeast High School | 6 ft 2 in (1.88 m) | 262 lb (119 kg) | 4.7 | Nov 24, 2008 |
| Chris Bonds; DT | Recruit ratings: Scout: Rivals: 247Sports: (80) | | | | | |
| Michael Bowman; WR | Rossville, Georgia | Ridgeland High School | 6 ft 4 in (1.93 m) | 206 lb (93 kg) | 4.7 | Sep 13, 2008 |
| Michael Bowman; WR | Recruit ratings: Scout: Rivals: 247Sports: (75) | | | | | |
| James Carpenter; OL | Coffeyville, Kansas | Coffeyville Community College | 6 ft 5 in (1.96 m) | 205 lb (93 kg) | | Nov 29, 2008 |
| James Carpenter; OL | Recruit ratings: Scout: Rivals: 247Sports: (NR) | | | | | |
| Quinton Dial; DT | Pinson, Alabama | Clay-Chalkville High School | 6 ft 5 in (1.96 m) | 308 lb (140 kg) | 5.1 | Jun 9, 2008 |
| Quinton Dial; DT | Recruit ratings: Scout: Rivals: 247Sports: (79) | | | | | |
| D. J. Fluker; OL | Foley, Alabama | Foley High School | 6 ft 7 in (2.01 m) | 350 lb (160 kg) | 4.9 | Nov 7, 2007 |
| D. J. Fluker; OL | Recruit ratings: Scout: Rivals: 247Sports: (86) | | | | | |
| Nico Johnson; LB | Andalusia, Alabama | Andalusia High School | 6 ft 3 in (1.91 m) | 226 lb (103 kg) | 4.58 | Sep 3, 2008 |
| Nico Johnson; LB | Recruit ratings: Scout: Rivals: 247Sports: (84) | | | | | |
| Kendall Kelly; WR | Gadsden, Alabama | Gadsden City High School | 6 ft 4 in (1.93 m) | 210 lb (95 kg) | 4.45 | Feb 4, 2009 |
| Kendall Kelly; WR | Recruit ratings: Scout: Rivals: 247Sports: (82) | | | | | |
| Dre Kirkpatrick; DB | Gadsden, Alabama | Gadsden City High School | 6 ft 2 in (1.88 m) | 180 lb (82 kg) | 4.5 | Feb 4, 2009 |
| Dre Kirkpatrick; DB | Recruit ratings: Scout: Rivals: 247Sports: (92) | | | | | |
| Eddie Lacy; RB | Geismar, Louisiana | Dutchtown High School | 5 ft 11 in (1.80 m) | 210 lb (95 kg) | 4.4 | Feb 4, 2009 |
| Eddie Lacy; RB | Recruit ratings: Scout: Rivals: 247Sports: (81) | | | | | |
| Mike Marrow; RB | Toledo, Ohio | Central Catholic High School | 6 ft 2 in (1.88 m) | 240 lb (110 kg) | 4.7 | Jun 20, 2008 |
| Mike Marrow; RB | Recruit ratings: Scout: Rivals: 247Sports: (80) | | | | | |
| A. J. McCarron; QB | Mobile, Alabama | St. Paul's Episcopal High School | 6 ft 4 in (1.93 m) | 189 lb (86 kg) | 4.8 | May 3, 2008 |
| A. J. McCarron; QB | Recruit ratings: Scout: Rivals: 247Sports: (83) | | | | | |
| Darius McKeller; OL | Jonesboro, Georgia | Jonesboro High School | 6 ft 6 in (1.98 m) | 280 lb (130 kg) | 5.1 | Apr 23, 2008 |
| Darius McKeller; OL | Recruit ratings: Scout: Rivals: 247Sports: (78) | | | | | |
| William Ming; DE | Athens, Alabama | Athens High School | 6 ft 4 in (1.93 m) | 265 lb (120 kg) | 4.8 | Jul 22, 2008 |
| William Ming; DE | Recruit ratings: Scout: Rivals: 247Sports: (80) | | | | | |
| Brandon Moore; OL | Montgomery, Alabama | George Washington Carver High School | 6 ft 4 in (1.93 m) | 313 lb (142 kg) | 5.2 | Feb 4, 2009 |
| Brandon Moore; OL | Recruit ratings: Scout: Rivals: 247Sports: (79) | | | | | |
| Kevin Norwood; WR | D'Iberville, Mississippi | D'Iberville High School | 6 ft 3 in (1.91 m) | 180 lb (82 kg) | 4.55 | Dec 16, 2008 |
| Kevin Norwood; WR | Recruit ratings: Scout: Rivals: 247Sports: (77) | | | | | |
| Anthony Orr; DE | Harvest, Alabama | Sparkman High School | 6 ft 4 in (1.93 m) | 260 lb (120 kg) | 4.78 | Jul 29, 2008 |
| Anthony Orr; DE | Recruit ratings: Scout: Rivals: 247Sports: (76) | | | | | |
| Tana Patrick; LB | Stevenson, Alabama | North Jackson High School | 6 ft 3 in (1.91 m) | 215 lb (98 kg) | 4.5 | Feb 4, 2009 |
| Tana Patrick; LB | Recruit ratings: Scout: Rivals: 247Sports: (81) | | | | | |
| Trent Richardson; RB | Pensacola, Florida | Escambia High School | 5 ft 11 in (1.80 m) | 210 lb (95 kg) | 4.5 | Feb 4, 2009 |
| Trent Richardson; RB | Recruit ratings: Scout: Rivals: 247Sports: (91) | | | | | |
| Darrington Sentimore; DT | Destrehan, Louisiana | Destrehan High School | 6 ft 3 in (1.91 m) | 265 lb (120 kg) | 4.6 | Oct 5, 2008 |
| Darrington Sentimore; DT | Recruit ratings: Scout: Rivals: 247Sports: (79) | | | | | |
| Petey Smith; LB | Seffner, Florida | Armwood High School | 6 ft 0 in (1.83 m) | 230 lb (100 kg) | 4.6 | Jan 28, 2009 |
| Petey Smith; LB | Recruit ratings: Scout: Rivals: 247Sports: (81) | | | | | |
| Anthony Steen; OL | Clarksdale, Mississippi | Lee Academy | 6 ft 4 in (1.93 m) | 297 lb (135 kg) | 4.9 | Jul 29, 2008 |
| Anthony Steen; OL | Recruit ratings: Scout: Rivals: 247Sports: (78) | | | | | |
| Ed Stinson; DE | Homestead, Florida | South Dade High School | 6 ft 4 in (1.93 m) | 227 lb (103 kg) | 4.6 | Jan 30, 2009 |
| Ed Stinson; DE | Recruit ratings: Scout: Rivals: 247Sports: (80) | | | | | |
| Chance Warmack; OL | Atlanta, Georgia | Westlake High School | 6 ft 2 in (1.88 m) | 329 lb (149 kg) | 5.5 | May 23, 2008 |
| Chance Warmack; OL | Recruit ratings: Scout: Rivals: 247Sports: (79) | | | | | |
| Kellen Williams; OL | Snellville, Georgia | Brookwood High School | 6 ft 3 in (1.91 m) | 295 lb (134 kg) | 5.2 | Apr 27, 2008 |
| Kellen Williams; OL | Recruit ratings: Scout: Rivals: 247Sports: (75) | | | | | |
| Rod Woodson; DB | Olive Branch, Mississippi | Olive Branch High School | 5 ft 11 in (1.80 m) | 200 lb (91 kg) | 4.5 | Jul 25, 2008 |
| Rod Woodson; DB | Recruit ratings: Scout: Rivals: 247Sports: (78) | | | | | |
Overall recruit ranking: Scout: 2 Rivals: 1 ESPN: 2
‡ Refers to 40-yard dash; Note: In many cases, Scout, Rivals, 247Sports, On3, and ESPN may conflict in their listings of height, weight and 40 time.; In these cases, the average was taken. ESPN grades are on a 100-point scale.; Sources: "Scout.com Football Recruiting: Alabama". Scout.; "2009 Player Signees- Alabama". ESPN.; "Scout.com Team Recruiting Rankings". Scout.; "2009 Team Ranking". Rivals.com.

== Statistics ==
On the defensive side of the ball, Alabama ranked second in scoring defense (11.71 points per game), second in total defense (244.14 yards per game), second in rushing defense (78.14 yards per game) and tenth in passing defense (166.00 yards per game). They were also the conference leaders in scoring, total and rushing defense. On offense, nationally the Crimson Tide ranked 12th in rushing offense (215.07 yards per game), 22nd in scoring offense (32.07 points per game), 42nd in total offense (403.00 yards per game) and 92nd in passing offense (187.93 yards per game). Individually, Leigh Tiffin led the SEC with an average of 2.14 field goals and 9.43 points per game.

== Awards and honors ==
In the weeks following the SEC Championship Game, multiple Alabama players were recognized for their on-field performances with a variety of awards and recognitions. At the team awards banquet on December 6, Javier Arenas, Mike Johnson and Rolando McClain were each named the permanent captains of the 2009 squad. At that time both McClain and Mark Ingram were also named the 2009 co-most valuable players with McClain and Terrence Cody named defensive players of the year and Ingram and Johnson named the offensive players of the year.

=== Conference ===
The SEC recognized several players for their individual performances with various awards. Alabama swept the three major individual awards on the AP All-SEC team, with Mark Ingram II named Offensive Player of the Year, Rolando McClain named Defensive Player of the Year, and Nick Saban named Coach of the Year. In addition to Ingram and McClain, Javier Arenas (as a defensive back), Terrance Cody, Mike Johnson, and Leigh Tiffin were named to the AP All-SEC First Team. James Carpenter, Colin Peek, and Arenas (as a return specialist) were named to the AP All-SEC Second Team. Eight players were named to the Coaches' All-SEC First Team, including Arenas (as both a defensive back and return specialist), Mark Barron, Cody, Ingram, Mike Johnson, McClain, and Tiffin. Julio Jones was named to the Coaches' All-SEC Second Team. Nico Johnson, Barrett Jones, and Trent Richardson were named to the 2009 Freshman All-SEC Team.

=== National ===
After the season, a number of Alabama players were named as national award winners and finalists. Mark Ingram II became Alabama's first Heisman Trophy winner, with the closest margin of victory in the history of the award, over Stanford's Toby Gerhart. Ingram was a finalist for the Maxwell Award and the Doak Walker Award. Linebacker Rolando McClain won the Butkus Award and the Jack Lambert Award. Other national award finalists included Terrence Cody (for the Chuck Bednarik Award) and Leigh Tiffin (for the Lou Groza Award). Defensive coordinator Kirby Smart won the Broyles Award as the nation's top assistant coach.

In addition to the individual awards, several players were also named to various national All-American Teams. Javier Arenas, Terrance Cody, Mark Ingram II, Mike Johnson, Rolando McClain, and Leigh Tiffin were named to the AP All-American First Team and Mark Barron was named to the AP All-American Second Team. Cody, Ingram, Mike Johnson, and McClain were named to the Walter Camp All-American First Team. Arenas and Tiffin were named to the Walter Camp All-American Second Team. Arenas, Ingram, Mike Johnson, and McClain were named to the AFCA All-America Team. With their selections on various teams, Mike Johnson, Mark Ingram II, Terrence Cody, Rolando McClain and Javier Arenas were each consensus All-America, with Ingram and McClain each being unanimous selections.

== After the season ==
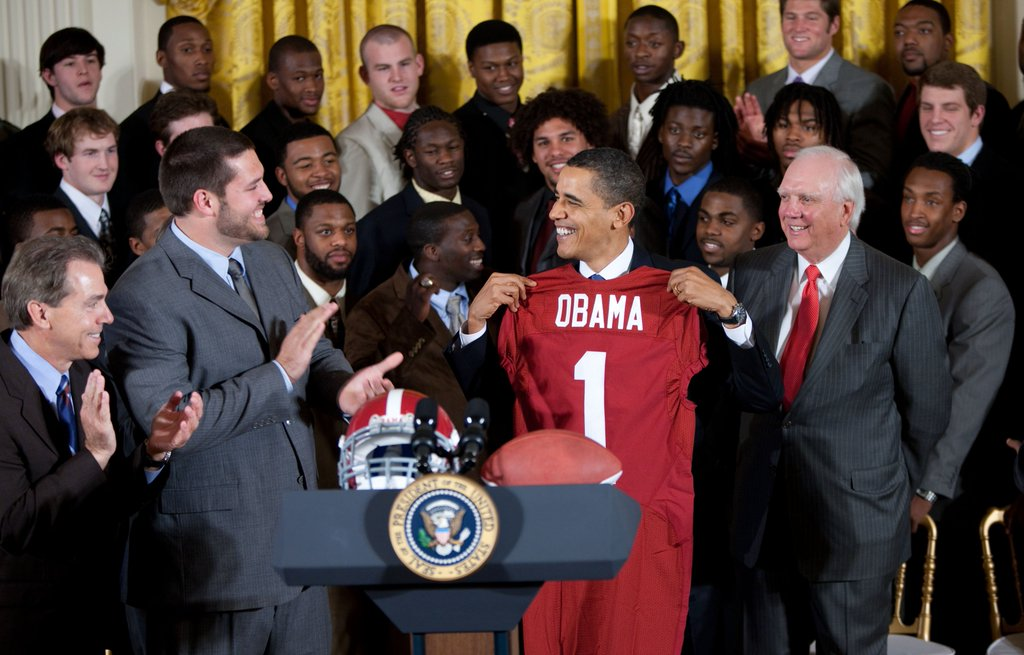
The Crimson Tide meet with President Barack Obama after winning the national championship.

Barack Obama welcomes the Crimson Tide to the White House
The Crimson Tide visit the White House
Remarks by Barack Obama during the Crimson Tide's visit to the White House on March 8, 2010

Following the victory against Texas for the national championship, the team arrived at the Tuscaloosa Regional Airport on the evening of January 8. Several thousand fans were there to greet them upon their arrival. On January 16, a public national championship celebration at Bryant–Denny Stadium was attended by well over 30,000 spectators. Speakers at the event included head coach Nick Saban and Alabama athletic director Mal Moore. All of the championship trophies were available for public viewing. In early March, the team was invited to the White House, where U.S. president Barack Obama greeted the team and offered congratulatory remarks for their championship season.

For their victory, each team member and coach received three championship rings designed by Jostens: a university-issued title ring, a BCS issued title ring, and another for winning the SEC championship. The rings were distributed as part of the annual A-Day weekend the following April. Also as part of the A-Day celebrations, the 2009 team captains Javier Arenas, Rolando McClain, and Mike Johnson were honored at the Walk of Fame ceremony at the base of Denny Chimes. As recognition for becoming the fifth Alabama head coach to win a national championship, the university unveiled a statue of coach Saban along the Walk of Champions outside Bryant–Denny Stadium as part of A-Day festivities on April 16, 2011.

=== All-star games ===
Seven Alabama players were selected by postseason all-star games. Lorenzo Washington appeared in the Texas vs. The Nation Game. Justin Woodall participated in the East-West Shrine Game. Javier Arenas, Terrence Cody, Mike Johnson, Colin Peek, and Leigh Tiffin played in the Under Armour Senior Bowl.

=== NFL draft ===
Of all the draft-eligible juniors, only Rolando McClain and Kareem Jackson declared their eligibility for the 2010 NFL draft. Ten Alabama players, eight seniors and two juniors, were invited to the NFL Scouting Combine. The invited Alabama players were tight end Colin Peek, offensive lineman Mike Johnson, defensive linemen Terrence Cody, Brandon Deaderick and Lorenzo Washington, linebacker Rolando McClain, defensive backs Javier Arenas, Kareem Jackson and Justin Woodall, and placekicker Leigh Tiffin. In the draft, Alabama had seven players selected. The first round selections were McClain (8th Oakland Raiders) and Jackson (20th Houston Texans); the second round picks were Arenas (50th Kansas City Chiefs) and Cody (57th Baltimore Ravens); the third round pick was Mike Johnson (98th Atlanta Falcons); and the seventh round picks were Marquis Johnson (211th St. Louis Rams) and Deaderick (247th New England Patriots). Both Peek and Washington, with the Atlanta Falcons and Dallas Cowboys respectively, signed as undrafted free agents.

Following the 2010 season, juniors Mark Ingram II, Julio Jones and Marcell Dareus declared their eligibility for the 2011 NFL draft. Five Alabama players, two seniors and three juniors, were invited to the 2011 NFL Scouting Combine. The invited players were offensive lineman James Carpenter, quarterback Greg McElroy, defensive end Marcell Dareus, running back Mark Ingram II, and wide receiver Julio Jones. In the draft, Alabama set a school record with four players selected in the first round. The first round selections were Dareus (3rd Buffalo Bills), Jones (6th Atlanta Falcons), Carpenter (25th Seattle Seahawks) and Ingram (28th New Orleans Saints). McElroy was selected in the seventh round (208th New York Jets). Preston Dial signed as an undrafted free agent with the Detroit Lions in July 2011 after the NFL labor dispute was resolved.
