= 2009 All-SEC football team =

American college football all-star team

The 2009 All-SEC football team consists of American football players selected to the All-Southeastern Conference (SEC) chosen by the Associated Press (AP) and the conference coaches for the 2009 Southeastern Conference football season. Coaches could not vote for their own players, making a selection to 11 of the 12 coaches' squads earn one a unanimous selection.

The Alabama Crimson Tide won the conference, beating the previous season's conference and national champion Florida Gators, 32 to 13 in the SEC Championship game. Alabama then defeated the Big 12 champion Texas Longhorns in the National Championship game 37 to 21. Alabama led the conference with six consensus first-team All-SEC selections by both the AP and the coaches. Florida was second with five. Alabama featured four on defense, while Florida had four on offense.

Alabama running back Mark Ingram II, a unanimous selection, won the Heisman Trophy and was voted AP SEC Offensive Player of the Year. Florida quarterback Tim Tebow was a unanimous selection of the conference coaches and was voted the coaches' SEC Offensive Player of the Year. Tebow, who won the Heisman as a sophomore in 2007, was the preseason pick as the AP Offensive Player of the Year. Alabama linebacker Rolando McClain, unanimous, was voted the AP Defensive Player of the Year and won the Butkus Award given to the nation's top linebacker. Tennessee safety Eric Berry, a unanimous selection by AP, was the preseason pick as the AP Defensive Player of the Year and won the Thorpe award given to the nation's top defensive back. Georgia punter Drew Butler, a consensus selection, won the Ray Guy Award given to the nation's top punter. Berry, Butler, and Florida cornerback Joe Haden were unanimous All-American selections. Ingram and McClain missed out on being unanimous All-Americans by one selector.

Florida tight end Aaron Hernandez, who won the Mackey Award given to the nation's top tight end, was later convicted of the murder of Odin Lloyd.

== Offensive selections ==
=== Quarterbacks ===
- Tim Tebow#, Florida (AP-1, Coaches-1)
- Ryan Mallett, Arkansas (AP-2, Coaches-2)

=== Running backs ===
- Mark Ingram II†, Alabama (AP-1, Coaches-1)
- Anthony Dixon, Miss. St. (AP-1, Coaches-1)
- Dexter McCluster, Ole Miss (AP-2, Coaches-2)
- Montario Hardesty, Tennessee (AP-2, Coaches-2)
- Ben Tate, Auburn (AP-2)

=== Wide receivers ===
- A. J. Green, Georgia (AP-1, Coaches-1)
- Shay Hodge, Ole Miss (AP-1, Coaches-1)
- Brandon LaFell, LSU (AP-2, Coaches-2)
- Joe Adams, Arkansas (AP-2)
- Riley Cooper, Florida (AP-2)
- Julio Jones, Alabama (Coaches-2)

=== Centers ===
- Maurkice Pouncey, Florida (AP-1, Coaches-1)
- Ryan Pugh, Auburn (AP-2)
- Ben Jones, Georgia (Coaches-2)

=== Guards ===
- Mike Pouncey, Florida (AP-1, Coaches-1)
- Mike Johnson, Alabama (AP-1, Coaches-1)
- Mitch Petrus, Arkansas (AP-2, Coaches-1)
- Clint Boling, Georgia (AP-2)
- Zipp Duncan, Kentucky (Coaches-2)

=== Tackles ===
- Ciron Black, LSU (AP-1, Coaches-1)
- John Jerry, Ole Miss (AP-1, Coaches-1)
- Chris Scott, Tennessee (AP-2, Coaches-2)
- James Carpenter, Alabama (AP-2)
- Lee Ziemba, Auburn (Coaches-2)
- Derek Sherrod, Miss. St. (Coaches-2)

=== Tight ends ===
- Aaron Hernandez, Florida (AP-1, Coaches-1)
- Colin Peek, Alabama (AP-2)
- D. J. Williams, Arkansas (Coaches-2)

== Defensive selections ==
=== Defensive ends ===
- Antonio Coleman, Auburn (AP-1, Coaches-1)
- Carlos Dunlap, Florida (AP-1, Coaches-1)
- Jermaine Cunningham, Florida (AP-2, Coaches-2)
- Justin Houston, Georgia (AP-2, Coaches-2)
- Pernell McPhee, Miss. St. (AP-2, Coaches-2)

=== Defensive tackles ===
- Terrence Cody*, Alabama (AP-1, Coaches-1)
- Dan Williams, Tennessee (AP-1, Coaches-2)
- Corey Peters, Kentucky (AP-2, Coaches-1)
- Geno Atkins, Georgia (AP-2, Coaches-2)
- Malcolm Sheppard, Arkansas (AP-2, Coaches-2)
- Jerrell Powe, Ole Miss (AP-2)
- Cliff Matthews, South Carolina (Coaches-2)

=== Linebackers ===
- Rolando McClain†, Alabama (AP-1, Coaches-1)
- Eric Norwood*, South Carolina (AP-1, Coaches-1)
- Rennie Curran, Georgia (AP-1, Coaches-1)
- Brandon Spikes, Florida (AP-2, Coaches-1)
- Rico McCoy, Tennessee (AP-2, Coaches-2)
- Sam Maxwell, Kentucky (AP-2)
- Micah Johnson, Kentucky (Coaches-2)
- Chris Marve, Vanderbilt (Coaches-2)
- Ryan Stamper, Florida (Coaches-2)

=== Cornerbacks ===
- Joe Haden, Florida (AP-1, Coaches-1)
- Javier Arenas, Alabama (AP-1, Coaches-1)
- Myron Lewis, Vanderbilt (AP-2, Coaches-2)
- Patrick Peterson, LSU (AP-2, Coaches-2)
- Walt McFadden, Auburn (AP-2, Coaches-2)
- Chris Culliver, South Carolina (AP-2)
- Trevard Lindley, Kentucky (Coaches-2)

=== Safeties ===
- Eric Berry*, Tennessee (AP-1, Coaches-1)
- Mark Barron, Alabama (AP-1, Coaches-1)
- Chad Jones, LSU (AP-2, Coaches-2)

== Special teams ==
=== Kickers ===
- Leigh Tiffin, Alabama (AP-1, Coaches-1)
- Blair Walsh, Georgia (AP-2, Coaches-2)

=== Punters ===
- Drew Butler, Georgia (AP-1, Coaches-1)
- Chas Henry, Florida (AP-2)
- Brett Upson, Vanderbilt (Coaches-2)

=== All purpose/return specialist ===
- Javier Arenas, Alabama (AP-2, Coaches-1)
- Randall Cobb, Kentucky (AP-1)
- Dexter McCluster, Ole Miss (AP-1)
- Derrick Locke, Kentucky (AP-2)
- Warren Norman, Vanderbilt (Coaches-2)

== Key ==
Bold = Consensus first-team selection by both the coaches and AP

AP = Associated Press

Coaches = Selected by the SEC coaches

* = Unanimous selection of AP

# = Unanimous selection of Coaches

† = Unanimous selection of both AP and Coaches

== See also ==
- 2009 Southeastern Conference football season
- 2009 College Football All-America Team
