= Rolando McClain =

American football player (born 1989)

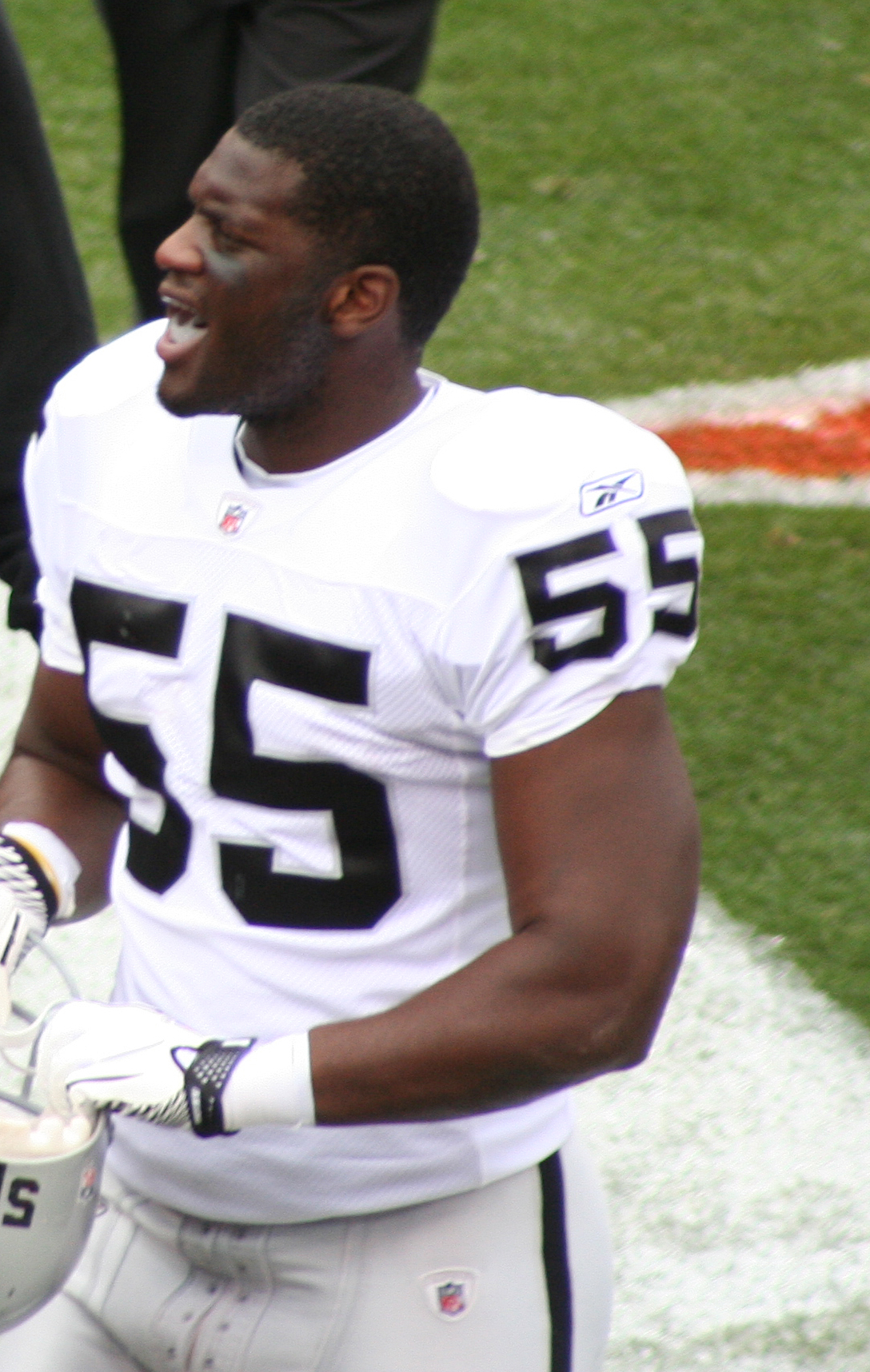
- McClain with the Oakland Raiders in 2010

No. 55
- Position: Linebacker

Personal information
- Born: July 14, 1989 (age 37); Athens, Alabama, U.S.
- Listed height: 6 ft 3 in (1.91 m)
- Listed weight: 254 lb (115 kg)

Career information
- High school: Decatur (Decatur, Alabama)
- College: Alabama (2007–2009)
- NFL draft: 2010: 1st round, 8th overall pick

Career history
- Oakland Raiders (2010–2012); Baltimore Ravens (2013)*; Dallas Cowboys (2014–2015)
- * Offseason or practice squad member only

Awards and highlights
- PFWA All-Rookie Team (2010); BCS national champion (2009); Butkus Award (2009); Jack Lambert Trophy (2009); Unanimous All-American (2009); SEC Defensive Player of the Year (2009); 2× First-team All-SEC (2008–2009)

Career NFL statistics
- Total tackles: 407
- Sacks: 9.5
- Forced fumbles: 2
- Interceptions: 4
- Defensive touchdowns: 1
- Stats at Pro Football Reference

Rolando Marquise McClain (born July 14, 1989) is an American former professional football player who was a linebacker in the National Football League (NFL). He played college football for the Alabama Crimson Tide, earning unanimous All-American honors in 2009 and winning the 2010 BCS National Championship. He was selected eighth overall by the Oakland Raiders in the 2010 NFL draft, and also played in the National Football League (NFL) for the Dallas Cowboys.

== Early life ==
McClain attended Decatur High School in Decatur, Alabama, where he played linebacker and tight end for the Decatur Red Raiders high school football team. As a junior, he made 104 tackles, 11 for loss, four sacks, an interception, three forced fumbles, and one fumble recovery to go along with his 24 receptions for 436 yards on the offensive side of the ball. McClain's senior season ended with 106 tackles and 13 for loss, which led to Parade All-American honors, and selection to play in the first Offense-Defense All-American Bowl in Fort Lauderdale, Florida.

During his high school years, he was diagnosed with Crohn's disease, although later tests seemed to indicate that was a misdiagnosis.

Considered a four-star recruit by Rivals.com, McClain was listed as the No. 2 inside linebacker in the nation in 2007. He chose Alabama over offers from Auburn, Ole Miss, Mississippi State, Vanderbilt, Kentucky, and Louisville.

== College career ==
McClain accepted an athletic scholarship to attend the University of Alabama, where he played for coach Nick Saban's Alabama Crimson Tide football team from 2007 to 2009.

=== 2007 ===
As a true freshman in 2007, McClain started 8 of 13 games, finishing the season with 75 tackles, two interceptions, and a sack. He was recognized as a Southeastern Conference (SEC) All-Freshman selection.

=== 2008 ===
As a sophomore in 2008, McClain compiled 95 tackles, three sacks, and an interception, earning Associated Press (AP) third-team All-American honors, and was a first-team All-SEC selection.

=== 2009 ===
During his junior year in 2009, McClain had 105 tackles including 14.5 tackles for loss, four sacks, fourteen quarterback hurries, two interceptions, three passes broken up, and a forced fumble. He was named Football Writers Association of America (FWAA) National Defensive Player of the Week for his performance against Kentucky in early October. Following the SEC Championship Game, Rolando was named SEC Defensive Player of the Year, and a first-team All-SEC selection.

On December 7, 2009, McClain was announced as the winner of the 2009 Lambert Award for the best collegiate linebacker. He is the first Alabama linebacker to win the Lambert Award since its inception in 1991. A day later, he was also awarded the 2009 Dick Butkus Award, being only the second Crimson Tide player to do so (along with Derrick Thomas in 1988). He was recognized a unanimous first-team All-American, after being named to the first teams of the American Football Coaches Association, Associated Press, Football Writers Association of America, Sporting News, and Walter Camp Football Foundation.

On January 11, 2010, a few days after winning the BCS National Championship, McClain decided to forgo his senior year at Alabama and enter the 2010 NFL Draft.

== Professional career ==
Pre-draft measurables
Height	Weight	Arm length	Hand span	40-yard dash	10-yard split	20-yard split	20-yard shuttle	Three-cone drill	Vertical jump	Broad jump	Bench press	Wonderlic
6 ft 3 3/8 in (1.91 m)	254 lb (115 kg)	33 in (0.84 m)	9 3/8 in (0.24 m)	4.68 s	1.62 s	2.72 s	4.38 s	7.16 s	35.0 in (0.89 m)	9 ft 1 in (2.77 m)	24 reps	16
Measurables and BP from NFL Combine, all others from Alabama Pro Day

=== Oakland Raiders ===
==== 2010 season ====
McClain was selected by the Oakland Raiders in the first round with the eighth overall pick in the 2010 NFL draft. He was the highest drafted Alabama Crimson Tide linebacker since Keith McCants went fourth overall to the Tampa Bay Buccaneers in the 1990 NFL draft.

McClain signed his contract with the Raiders on July 28, 2010, in time to make the first day of training camp. The contract was estimated to be for $40 million over 5 years.

McClain finished his first season with 85 tackles (second on the team), 0.5 sacks, one interception, and 6 passes defended. In week 2 of the 2010 season against the St. Louis Rams, McClain body slammed Danny Amendola, which drew an "unnecessary roughness" call and eventually a $5,000 fine by the NFL. He recorded his first career sack in week 7 against Kyle Orton of the Denver Broncos and his first career interception in week 12 against Chad Henne of the Miami Dolphins.

==== 2011 season ====
In 2011, he appeared in 15 games (14 starts), posting 99 tackles (second on the team), 77 solo tackles, 5 sacks, 14 passes defended, and one safety.

==== 2012 season ====
During the 2012 NFL season, in which the Raiders' defense struggled and was statistically the worst defense in the league, McClain saw his playing time decrease following a 37–6 rout by the division rival Denver Broncos. During a week 4 game against Denver, McClain played in 73 snaps, but following the bye, the Raiders made the decision to replace him with 4th round rookie Miles Burris in their nickel package, resulting in McClain playing only 17 snaps compared to Burris' 55 in the week 6 game against the Atlanta Falcons. Head coach Dennis Allen said he has been impressed with Burris' ability to make corrections on the fly, and that the linebacker was not a "repeat offender" when it came to mistakes and a smart football player overall, indicating the coaching staff's belief that McClain was guilty of poor decision-making and too many errors. According to sources within the Raiders, it was reported by NFL.com's Albert Breer and Ian Rapoport that McClain had been kicked out of an official team practice session on November 29 due to an "incident". McClain then took to social media outlet Facebook and released a series of comments stating that he was ". . .no longer an Oakland Raider!!" and that he was ". . .mentally done." with the team, wishing ". . .to be anywhere besides here". He appeared in 11 games (9 starts), registering 90 tackles, one sack, 3 passes defensed and one forced fumble.

After various off-the-field incidents, however, he was waived by the Raiders on April 5, 2013. McClain had been drafted with the hopes that he could help improve the Raiders' run defense, an area where the team had been consistently among the worst in the league. Following a string of poor first round picks by late owner/GM Al Davis, the selection of McClain was applauded by many analysts. However, throughout his tenure with the Raiders, the team remained poor at defending the run.

=== Baltimore Ravens ===
McClain signed with the Baltimore Ravens on April 10, 2013. The contract was reportedly a one-year, $700,000 deal that included no guaranteed money. On May 15, McClain announced his retirement at the age of 23, before even the beginning of the offseason training camp.

=== Dallas Cowboys ===
==== 2014 season ====
On July 1, 2014, after linebacker Sean Lee was lost for the season, the Dallas Cowboys acquired McClain along with a seventh-round pick (No. 243: Laurence Gibson) from the Baltimore Ravens, in exchange for the Cowboys' sixth-round pick (No. 204: Darren Waller) in the 2015 NFL draft. McClain became an unquestioned team leader and played a critical role in the resurgence of the Cowboys' defense. Although he was slowed down with groin and knee injuries after Week 9 of the season, the unit raised its level when he was healthy and was setting the tone with his physical style and play-making ability. He finished with 12 starts in 13 games, one sack, five quarterback pressures, nine tackles for loss, two interceptions, five passes defensed, one forced fumble and 81 tackles. He took part in his first two postseason games, but suffered concussions in both contests.

==== 2015 season ====
On April 1, 2015, McClain agreed to a new one-year, $3 million contract with the Cowboys. On July 2, the NFL announced that he would be suspended for the first four games of the 2015 season for violating the league's substance abuse policy. He also had a surprise knee surgery during the offseason, which forced him to miss the entire conditioning program and most of training camp. He played in 11 of 12 games as the starting middle linebacker, with Lee moving to weakside linebacker. Although he got off to a slow start in his return from the suspension, he finished with 97 tackles (third on the team), 2 sacks, 3 passes defensed, and returned an interception for a touchdown against the Miami Dolphins.

==== 2016 season ====
On March 9, 2016, McClain agreed to another one-year deal with the Cowboys for $5 million. On June 30, he was suspended for the second season in a row for violating the NFL substance abuse policy, this time for the first 10 games of the 2016 NFL season. Midway through the season, he then failed another drug test and his suspension was extended indefinitely. On August 2, it was reported that McClain had become addicted to codeine after consuming the mixture known as purple drank, and that he is "a long way from ever resuming his NFL career". Jason Cole of Bleacher Report said McClain's return to the Cowboys is "almost impossible". In December 2016 he was suspended indefinitely.

McClain was conditionally reinstated by the NFL on August 30, 2019. However, he was released by the Cowboys when the reinstatement became official on September 2. McClain was suspended indefinitely again on December 30.

On December 13, 2023, after eight years of inactivity, McClain was reinstated by the NFL and declared a free agent. Following the lift of the ban, McClain announced his intention to return to the NFL.

== Career statistics ==
=== NFL ===
Year	Team	Games		Tackles				Fumbles				Interceptions					
Year	Team	GP	GS	Cmb	Solo	Ast	Sck	FF	FR	Yds	TD	Int	Yds	Avg	Lng	TD	PD
2010	OAK	15	15	85	59	26	0.5	0	0	0	0	1	10	10.0	10	0	6
2011	OAK	15	14	100	79	21	5.0	0	0	0	0	0	0	0.0	0	0	11
2012	OAK	11	9	60	37	23	1.0	1	0	0	0	0	0	0.0	0	0	0
2014	DAL	13	12	87	67	20	1.0	1	0	0	0	2	0	0.0	0	0	3
2015	DAL	11	11	80	50	30	2.0	0	0	0	0	1	12	12.0	12	1	3
Career		65	61	412	292	120	9.5	2	0	0	0	4	22	5.5	12	1	23

=== College ===
Season	Team	Class	GP	Tackling					Interceptions				
Season	Team	Class	GP	Cmb	Solo	Ast	TfL	Sck	Int	Yds	Avg	TD	PD
2007	Alabama	FR	13	74	38	36	5.0	1.0	2	40	20.0	0	0
2008	Alabama	SO	14	95	48	47	12.0	3.0	1	12	12.0	0	0
2009	Alabama	JR	14	105	53	52	14.5	4.0	2	21	10.5	0	0
Career			41	274	139	135	31.5	8.0	5	73	14.6	0	0

== Personal life ==
McClain was born in Athens, Alabama, to parents Roland Ervin Jr and Tonya Malone. He grew up in the projects of Decatur, Alabama. At 15, Rolando received a restraining order against his mother after she beat him and threatened him with a knife. At 16, she was arrested after she threatened his entire high school which resulted in a school lock down. During the trial she was diagnosed as having bipolar disorder. His estranged father was granted custody but McClain left to return to Decatur to stay eligible for football. He lived with several families his junior year. McClain could be considered to have been "on his own" since he was 15.

In April 2013, McClain married Capri Knox, with whom he had two sons, and they moved to Madison, Alabama. McClain and Knox had first met in 2007 at the University of Alabama where she was a member of the Alabama Track team. In September 2013, he filed for divorce. However, in an interview in October 2014, he said he wishes to be a better husband – thus records indicating that the two had been divorced since January 2014.

Between his departure from the Ravens in May 2013 and his return to football with the Cowboys in July 2014, McClain moved to Tuscaloosa, where he re-enrolled at the University of Alabama to try to finish his bachelor's degree in family financial planning. He was still a few credits short of the degree when he joined the Cowboys. In December 2017, McClain graduated from the University of Alabama.

=== Legal issues ===
On December 1, 2011, McClain was arrested by Decatur police and charged with third-degree assault, menacing, reckless endangerment, and discharging a firearm inside the city limits, all of which are misdemeanors, for a shooting incident that occurred the night before. On May 17, 2012, McClain was found guilty on all counts, ordered to pay a $500 fine for each charge, totaling $2,000, and sentenced to spend 45 days in jail for each charge, 180 in total. He was freed on bond, and will begin serving his sentence on June 1. On November 18, 2012, while the case was on appeal, the charges were dismissed by the Judge after the victim decided not to press charges. According to lawyers involved, a financial settlement was reached between McClain and the victim.

On January 8, 2013, he was arrested by Decatur Police in Morgan County after an officer pulled him over for a window tint violation. McClain provided the officer with a false name and he was arrested and booked into the Decatur City Jail. McClain bonded out of jail later that day.

On April 21, 2013, McClain was arrested for disorderly conduct and resisting arrest.

On December 22, 2014, he lost his Tuscaloosa house due to a fire that was eventually ruled as an arson. At the time, the house was vacant and listed for sale.

On August 2, 2016, after his suspension in June 2016 for violating the NFL substance abuse policy, it was reported that McClain had become addicted to codeine after consuming the mixture known as purple drank.

On May 12, 2017, he was arrested on equipment violations, firearm and drug charges, according to the Hartselle Police Department.

On July 30, 2022, he was arrested on drug and weapons charges, according to the Moulton Police Department.
