= 2010 Senior Bowl =

2010 Under Armour Senior Bowl
- 61st Senior Bowl
North Team	South Team
31	13
Head coach: Jim Schwartz (Detroit Lions)	Head coach: Tony Sparano (Miami Dolphins)
	1	2	3	4	Total
North	3	14	7	7	31
South	3	10	0	0	13
- Date: January 30, 2010
- Season: 2009
- Stadium: Ladd–Peebles Stadium
- Location: Mobile, Alabama
- MVP: Brandon Graham
- Referee: Adrian Hill

United States TV coverage
- Network: NFL Network
- Announcers: Bob Papa play-by-play Mike Mayock color Charles Davis color

The 2010 Senior Bowl was an all-star college football exhibition game featuring players from the 2009 college football season, and prospects for the 2010 draft of the professional National Football League (NFL), as well as for the United Football League's inaugural draft.

The 61st edition of the Senior Bowl was played on January 30, 2010, at 3 p.m. local time at Ladd–Peebles Stadium in Mobile, Alabama. Coverage of the event was in high-definition on the NFL Network. Clothing company Under Armour sponsored the event for the fourth consecutive year and provided apparel for the game. The North team won, 31–13.

== Scoring summary ==
Scoring play	Score
1st quarter
North — Brett Swenson 43-yard field goal, 6:01	North 3–0
South — Leigh Tiffin 43-yard field goal, 2:25	Tied 3–3
2nd quarter
North — LeGarrette Blount 14-yard run (Brett Swenson kick), 14:40	North 10–3
North — Austen Lane 6-yard fumble recovery (Brett Swenson kick), 9:53	North 17–3
South — Leigh Tiffin 33-yard field goal, 3:36	North 17–6
South — Colin Peek 19-yard pass from Zac Robinson (Leigh Tiffin kick), 0:07	North 17–13
3rd quarter
North — Dan LeFevour 1-yard run (Brett Swenson kick), 3:52	North 24–13
4th quarter
North — Mardy Gilyard 32-yard pass from Dan LeFevour (Brett Swenson kick), 11:21	North 31–13

== Coaching staff ==
=== North Team ===
Name	Type	NFL Coaching Experience
Jim Schwartz	Head Coach	17 years
Gunther Cunningham	Defensive Coordinator	28 years
Scott Linehan	Offensive Coordinator	8 years
Jeff Horton	Quarterbacks	4 years
Matt Burke	Linebackers	6 years
Shawn Jefferson	Wide Receivers	5 years
Tim Lappano	Tight Ends	8 years
George Yarno	Offensive Line	2 years
Jeremiah Washburn	Assistant Offensive Line	8 years
Sam Gash	Running Backs	5 years
Todd Downing	Offensive Quality Control	7 years
Don Clemons	Defensive Assistant	25 years
Bob Karmelowicz	Defensive Line	18 years
Daron Roberts	Assistant Secondary	3 years
Kris Kocurek	Assistant Defensive Line	1 year
Tim Walton	Secondary	1 year
Bradford Banta	Assistant Special Teams	2 years
Jason Arapoff	Coordinator of Physical Development	12 years
Malcolm Blacken	Strength & Conditioning	14 years
Ted Rath	Strength & Conditioning Assistant	1 year

=== South Team ===
Name	Type	NFL Coaching Experience
Tony Sparano	Head Coach	12 years
Dan Henning	Offensive Coordinator	30 years
Todd Bowles	Assistant Head Coach/Secondary	11 years
David Lee	Quarterbacks	7 years
Kacy Rodgers	Defensive Line	8 years
James Saxon	Running Backs	10 years
Kar Dorrell	Wide Receivers	5 years
Dave DeGuglielmo	Offensive Line	6 years
John Bonamego	Special Teams	11 years
George DeLeone	Tight Ends	3 years
Darren Rizzi	Assistant Special Teams	1 year
Evan Marcus	Head Strength and Conditioning	6 years
Dave Puloka	Assistant Strength and Conditioning	3 years
Steve Bush	Offensive Quality Control	2 years
David Corrao	Defensive Quality Control	2 years

== Rosters ==
- Mardy Gilyard Won Offensive MVP in Senior Bowl.

=== North Team ===
No.	Name	Position	HT/WT	School
81	Alexander, Danario	WR	6-4 / 221	Missouri
44	Alualu, Tyson	DL	6-2 / 291	California
27	Asante, Larry	DB	5-11 / 211	Nebraska
68	Beadles, Zane	OL	6-4 / 307	Utah
25	Bell, Joique	RB	5-10 / 223	Wayne State
9	Blount, LeGarrette	RB	6-0 / 245	Oregon
29	Brown, Chris	RB	5-10 / 202	Oklahoma
9	Butler, Donald	LB	6-1 / 235	Washington
5	Canfield, Sean	QB	6-3 / 221	Oregon State
96	Carrington, Alex	DL	6-5 / 284	Arkansas State
94	Cole, Justin	DL	6-3 / 239	San Jose State
4	Coleman, Kurt	DB	5-10 / 187	Ohio State
2	Cook, Chris	DB	6-2 / 212	Virginia
82	Dickerson, Dorin	WR	6-1 / 222	Pittsburgh
83	Dickson, Ed	TE	6-4 / 244	Oregon
59	Dillard, Phillip	LB	6-0 / 242	Nebraska
72	Ducasse, Vladimir	OL	6-5 / 326	Massachusetts
54	Edds, A. J.	LB	6-4 / 245	Iowa
8	Ford, Jacoby	WR	5-9 / 181	Clemson
18	Ghee, Brandon	DB	5-11 / 189	Wake Forest
1	Gilyard, Mardy	WR	6-0 / 179	Cincinnati
55	Graham, Brandon	DL	6-1 / 263	Michigan
89	Graham, Garrett	TE	6-3 / 234	Wisconsin
16	Hoomanawanui, Mike	TE	6-4 / 267	Illinois
77	Iupati, Mike	OL	6-5 / 325	Idaho
33	Jackson, Cory	RB	6-1 / 245	Maryland
31	Jackson, Rashawn	RB	6-1 / 239	Virginia

No.	Name	Position	HT/WT	School
85	Jones, Donald	WR	6-2 / 214	Youngstown State
97	Lane, Austen	DL	6-6 / 267	Murray State
67	Lauvao, Shawn	OL	6-3 / 301	Arizona State
13	LeFevour, Dan	QB	6-3 / 229	Central Michigan
28	McCarthy, Kyle	DB	5-11 / 203	Notre Dame
21	McCourty, Devin	DB	5-11 / 186	Rutgers
42	Mesko, Zoltan	P	6-4 / 233	Michigan
10	Miller, Lonyae	RB	5-11 / 220	Fresno State
40	Misi, Koa	LB	6-3 / 244	Utah
92	Neal, Mike	DL	6-3 / 293	Purdue
91	Odrick, Jared	DL	6-5 / 301	Penn State
55	Olsen, Eric	OL	6-4 / 310	Notre Dame
15	Pike, Tony	QB	6-6 / 212	Cincinnati
23	Price, Taylor	WR	6-0 / 198	Ohio
11	Skinner, Terrell	DB	6-2 / 214	Maryland
98	Smith, D'Anthony	DL	6-2 / 300	Louisiana Tech
14	Swenson, Brett	PK	5-7 / 173	Michigan State
65	Tennant, Matt	OL	6-4 / 290	Boston College
95	Thomas, Cam	DL	6-4 / 331	North Carolina
5	Thompson, Syd'Quan	DB	5-9 / 182	California
76	Wang, Ed	OL	6-5 / 315	Virginia Tech
41	Washington, Daryl	LB	6-2 / 226	TCU
12	Weatherspoon, Sean	LB	6-0 / 241	Missouri
75	Welch, Thomas	OL	6-7 / 310	Vanderbilt
1	Wilson, Kyle	DB	5-10 / 190	Boise State
93	Windt, Mike	DS	6-1 / 249	Cincinnati
74	Young, Sam	OL	6-8 / 305	Notre Dame

=== South Team ===
No.	Name	Position	HT/WT	School
5	Allen, Nate	DB	6-1 / 205	South Florida
28	Arenas, Javier	DB	5-9 / 195	Alabama
56	Atkins, Geno	DL	6-1 / 286	Georgia
70	Black, Ciron	OL	6-5 / 331	LSU
16	Brown, Jarrett	QB	6-3 / 219	West Virginia
53	Byers, Jeff	OL	6-3 / 299	Southern Cal
69	Capers, Selvish	OL	6-5 / 304	West Virginia
22	Chaney, Jamar	LB	6-1 / 241	Mississippi State
62	Cody, Terrence	DL	6-4 / 370	Alabama
52	Coleman, Antonio	DL	6-2 / 255	Auburn
24	Coleman, Harry	DB	6-1 / 206	LSU
32	Conner, John	RB	5-11 / 245	Kentucky
11	Cooper, Riley	WR	6-3 / 214	Florida
59	Cox, Morgan	DS	6-3 / 248	Tennessee
17	Cox, Perrish	DB	5-11 / 189	Oklahoma State
24	Dixon, Anthony	RB	6-0 / 245	Mississippi State
42	Dodge, Matt	P	6-1 / 223	East Carolina
80	Graham, Jimmy	TE	6-6 / 259	Miami
3	Hodge, Shay	WR	6-1 / 208	Ole Miss
33	Houston, Lamarr	DL	6-2 / 302	Texas
77	Jerry, John	OL	6-5 / 332	Ole Miss
78	Johnson, Mike	OL	6-5 / 306	Alabama
13	Johnson, Stafon	RB	6-0 / 214	Southern Cal
91	Lang, Brandon	DL	6-3 / 260	Troy
58	Larsen, Ted	OL	6-2 / 302	N.C. State
32	Lindley, Trevard	DB	5-11 / 178	Kentucky
21	Mays, Taylor	DB	6-3 / 231	Southern Cal

No.	Name	Position	HT/WT	School
22	McCluster, Dexter	WR	5-8 / 165	Ole Miss
86	McCoy, Anthony	TE	6-4 / 249	Southern Cal
38	Muckelroy, Roddrick	LB	6-2 / 236	Texas
3	Murphy, Jerome	DB	6-0 / 191	South Florida
40	Norwood, Eric	LB	6-0 / 246	South Carolina
96	Owens, Jeff	DL	6-3 / 304	Georgia
84	Peek, Colin	TE	6-5 / 250	Alabama
66	Petrus, Mitch	OL	6-3 / 304	Arkansas
7	Roberts, Andre	WR	5-10 / 192	The Citadel
23	Robinson, Patrick	DB	5-11 / 190	Florida State
10	Robinson, Zac	QB	6-2 / 210	Oklahoma State
4	Rolle, Myron	DB	6-1 / 217	Florida State
79	Scott, Chris	OL	6-5 / 346	Tennessee
95	Selvie, George	DL	6-4 / 247	South Florida
50	Sharpton, Darryl	LB	5-11 / 229	Miami
91	Sheffield, Cameron	LB	6-2 / 256	Troy
44	Tate, Ben	RB	5-10 / 214	Auburn
15	Tebow, Tim	QB	6-2 / 236	Florida
99	Tiffin, Leigh	PK	6-1 / 198	Alabama
2	Upchurch, Roy	RB	5-11 / 210	Alabama
55	Walton, J. D.	OL	6-2 / 300	Baylor
36	Watson, Dekoda	LB	6-1 / 232	Florida State
5	Webb, Joe	WR	6-3 / 223	UAB
55	Williams, Dan	DL	6-2 / 329	Tennessee
20	Williams, Jeremy	WR	6-1 / 205	Tulane
93	Wilson, C. J.	DL	6-3 / 284	East Carolina
