= Brandon Deaderick =

American football player (born 1987)

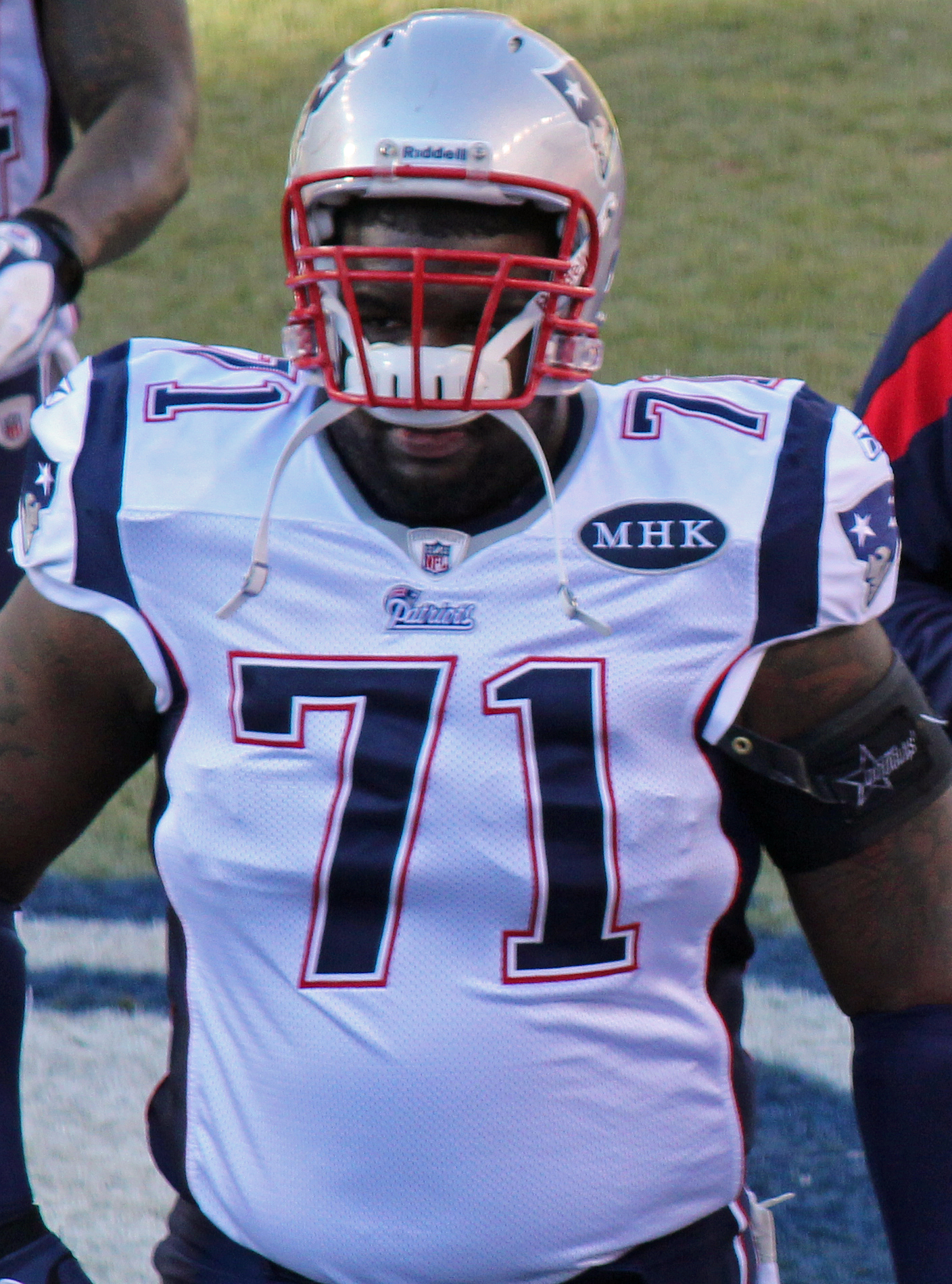
- Deaderick with the New England Patriots in 2011

No. 71, 92, 95
- Position: Defensive end

Personal information
- Born: August 19, 1987 (age 39); Fort Lee, Virginia, U.S.
- Listed height: 6 ft 4 in (1.93 m)
- Listed weight: 305 lb (138 kg)

Career information
- High school: Elizabethtown (Elizabethtown, Kentucky)
- College: Alabama
- NFL draft: 2010: 7th round, 247th overall pick

Career history
- New England Patriots (2010–2012); Jacksonville Jaguars (2013); New Orleans Saints (2014); Houston Texans (2015)*; Buffalo Bills (2016)*
- * Offseason or practice squad member only

Awards and highlights
- BCS national champion (2010)

Career NFL statistics
- Total tackles: 62
- Sacks: 5.5
- Forced fumbles: 3
- Fumble recoveries: 1
- Stats at Pro Football Reference

Brandon Augustus Deaderick (born August 19, 1987) is an American former professional football player who was a defensive end in the National Football League (NFL). He was selected by the New England Patriots in the seventh round of the 2010 NFL draft. He played college football for the Alabama Crimson Tide.

== Early life ==
Deaderick attended Elizabethtown High School in Elizabethtown, Kentucky. As a junior, he had 95 tackles and 22 sacks, earning all-state honors. As a senior, he missed four games to injury but averaged ten tackles per game and recorded seven sacks on the season. He also led EHS to their first state championship game in 24 years.

== College career ==
Following high school, Deaderick attended the University of Alabama, where he redshirted in his first season with the Crimson Tide in 2005. As a freshman in 2006, Deaderick played in seven games, finishing with two tackles. In 2007, Deaderick appeared in all 13 games and made seven starts, recording 22 tackles and two sacks. As a junior in 2008, he started 14 games at defensive end and finished the season with 36 tackles and four sacks.

In 2009, Deaderick was shot in the forearm during a robbery attempt he witnessed the week before the Chick-fil-A Kickoff Game. He wasn't seriously injured in the incident, he would be medically cleared to play later in the week and subsequently play in the 2009 opener. Alabama finished the 2009 season 14–0 beating Texas 37–21 in the 2010 BCS National Championship game. He finished his senior season with 23 tackles and one sack.

== Professional career ==
=== New England Patriots ===
Deaderick was selected by the New England Patriots in the seventh round (247th overall) of the 2010 NFL draft. He signed a four-year contract on July 9, 2010. As a rookie, Deaderick received his first career start in Week 6 against the Baltimore Ravens, recording his first career sack. He went on to start three of the next four games for the Patriots, but was a healthy inactive for the team's Thanksgiving game in Week 12 against the Detroit Lions. After playing in the next three games as a reserve, Deaderick missed the team's Week 16 game with an injury but was a healthy scratch for the regular season finale. He finished the regular season with 10 tackles and 2.0 sacks in 10 games played (four starts). On January 3, 2011, during the Patriots' playoffs bye week, Deaderick was suspended by the team. His suspension was lifted on January 7, 2011.

Deaderick played 10 games in the 2011 regular season with 17 tackles and 2 sacks. He also started in Super Bowl XLVI, where the Patriots eventually lost to the New York Giants 21–17.

Deaderick played 14 games in the 2012 regular season with 18 tackles, 1 sack, and 2 forced fumbles. He was released by the Patriots on May 13, 2013.

=== Jacksonville Jaguars ===
Deaderick was claimed off waivers by the Jacksonville Jaguars on May 14, 2013. He was placed on injured reserve on December 23, 2013.

=== New Orleans Saints ===
On June 3, 2014, he signed a one-year contract with the New Orleans Saints.

=== Houston Texans ===
Deadrick signed with the Houston Texans in June 2015 but was cut from training camp on September 4, 2015.

=== Buffalo Bills ===
On August 15, 2016, Deaderick was signed by the Bills. On September 2, 2016, he was released by the Bills as part of final roster cuts.

== Coaching career ==
Brandon Deaderick is a Football Analyst (Defense) at Mississippi since 2023
