= Cory Reamer =

American football player (born 1987)

No. 47
- Position: Linebacker

Personal information
- Born: May 6, 1987 (age 39); Hoover, Alabama, U.S.
- Listed height: 6 ft 3 in (1.91 m)
- Listed weight: 231 lb (105 kg)

Career information
- High school: Hoover
- College: Alabama
- NFL draft: 2010: undrafted

Career history
- New York Jets (2010)*
- * Offseason or practice squad member only

Awards and highlights
- BCS national champion (2010)

Cory Reamer (born May 6, 1987) is a former American football linebacker who played in the National Football League (NFL). He played college football at Alabama.

== Early life ==
Reamer played defensive back and linebacker at high school powerhouse Hoover High School. Hoover won the state championship in 2002, 2003 and 2004. Reamer was the MVP of the 2004 championship game in which he had five tackles, two blocked punts (returning one for a touchdown) and a 42-yard interception return that set up another score. Future Alabama teammate and NFL quarterback John Parker Wilson was also on Hoover's championship teams.

== College career ==
Reamer switched to linebacker at Alabama. His first two seasons were plagued by injury, and he was given a medical redshirt in his second season. As a sophomore in 2007 he was a starter on special teams. Reamer became a starter on defense in his junior year and registered 35 tackles, six tackles for loss, one sack and a forced fumble. In his senior year, Reamer was a starter on an Alabama defense that was considered the best in the country. On the season Reamer had 50 tackles, seven tackles for loss, two sacks, one forced fumble, one interception and one blocked kick. The Crimson Tide defeated Texas in the 2010 BCS National Championship Game to be crowned national champions.

== Professional career ==
Reamer was not taken in the 2010 NFL draft but he tried out for the Jets during rookie mini camp and impressed Jets head coach Rex Ryan enough to get a contract. Reamer would be waived by the team on September 4, 2010.
