= Luther Davis (American football) =

American football player

Profile
- Position: Defensive tackle

Personal information
- Listed height: 6 ft 3 in (1.91 m)
- Listed weight: 275 lb (125 kg)

Career information
- College: Alabama (2009)

Awards and highlights
- BCS national champion (2010)

Luther Davis is a former NCAA Division I football player for the University of Alabama who, in late 2013, became the subject of alleged violations of collegiate amateurism rules.

== College career ==
Davis was one of Nick Saban's first big recruits at Alabama. Ranked as the 15th best defensive tackle of the 2007 class by Rivals.com; Davis stunned the college football world by reneging on his commitment to Louisiana State University in his native Louisiana.

Davis went on to play for the Crimson Tide for four years. He participated in Alabama's 2009 BCS Championship season, playing in all 14 games.

Pre-draft measurables
Height	Weight	40-yard dash	10-yard split	20-yard split	20-yard shuttle	Three-cone drill	Vertical jump	Broad jump	Bench press
6 ft 2 7/8 in (1.90 m)	286 lb (130 kg)	5.01 s	1.72 s	2.92 s	4.95 s	8.12 s	27.0 in (0.69 m)	8 ft 9 in (2.67 m)	13 reps
All values from Pro Day

== Post-collegiate activity ==
On September 11, 2013, Yahoo! Sports reported that Davis had acted as a sports agent or as a bagman for sports agents during late 2011 and early 2012. The news article was accompanied by subsequent reports containing facsimiles of receipts for flights and money transfers, as well as text messages which corroborate the evidence Yahoo Sports presented in its original story.

The documents and text messages indicate Davis made direct payments – as well as provided substantial benefits – to several collegiate football players. Davis reportedly provided payments and benefits into the several thousands of dollars to former Alabama offensive lineman D. J. Fluker.

In March 2026, Davis was charged with wire fraud and identity theft. He and another man were accused of obtaining fraudulent loans by posing as representatives of athletes and sometimes as the athletes themselves, including Michael Penix and Xavier McKinney. He pleaded guilty in April.
