= Colin Peek =

American football player (born 1986)

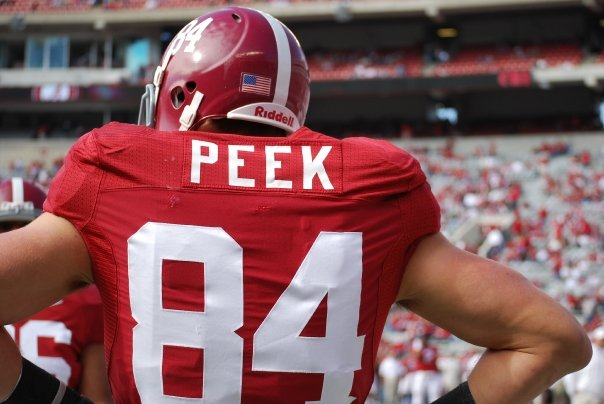
- Colin Peek during pre-game warmups in Bryant–Denny Stadium

Profile
- Position: Tight end

Personal information
- Born: June 4, 1986 (age 40); Ponte Vedra Beach, Florida, U.S.
- Listed height: 6 ft 6 in (1.98 m)
- Listed weight: 255 lb (116 kg)

Career information
- High school: Ponte Vedra Beach (FL) Bolles
- College: Alabama
- NFL draft: 2010: undrafted

Career history
- Atlanta Falcons (2010)*
- * Offseason or practice squad member only

Awards and highlights
- BCS national champion (2010); Second-team All-SEC (2009)

Colin Davis Peek (born June 4, 1986) is an American former football tight end. He attended the Georgia Institute of Technology before transferring to the University of Alabama. Peek signed a free agent contract after going undrafted, due to an injury at the NFL Combine, in the 2010 NFL draft. He was part of the Crimson Tide in the 2010 BCS National Championship.

== Early life ==
A Florida native, Peek attended The Bolles School where he played on three consecutive state championship teams. Coming out of high school, he was rated as a Top 30 tight end by both Scout.com (No. 23) and Rivals.com (No. 27). He chose to play at Georgia Tech for coach Chan Gailey before leaving to become the starting tight end for The University of Alabama under Nick Saban.

== College career ==
=== Georgia Tech ===
As a true freshman in 2005, Peek saw action in nine games for the Yellow Jackets. However, he failed to record any catches.

In 2006, Chan Gailey decided to redshirt Peek.

In 2007, Peek became a significant player for the Yellow Jackets. He started 11 out of 13 games and ranked third on the team with 25 receptions. He accumulated 248 yards and one touchdown. Season highlights for Peek included five receptions for 35 yards against Boston College, three receptions for 31 yard at Maryland, two receptions for 49 yards against Army, and three passes for 28 yards (including a 17-yard touchdown) against Georgia.

=== Alabama ===
Following the 2007 season, Chan Gailey was fired as Tech's head coach. When Paul Johnson was hired as the new coach for the Yellow Jackets, Peek knew his role in Johnson's triple option flexbone offense would be limited. He decided to transfer to Alabama who had just finished 7–6 in their first year under Nick Saban.

Peek was forced to sit out the 2008 season due to the NCAA transfer rule. He was eligible to play in the 2009 Sugar Bowl, but he had to miss the game due to an injured foot.

In 2009, Peek was a member of Alabama's first national championship team in 17 years. Peek recorded 26 receptions for 313 yards throughout the season. Three of Peek's receptions resulted in touchdowns. His third touchdown of the year came against Florida in the 2009 SEC Championship Game and was featured on the cover of the following week's Sports Illustrated issue. Peek caught at least one pass in 10 of 14 games. He did not record any catches in the 2010 BCS National Championship Game.

== Professional career ==
After not being drafted, due to a previous injury discovered at the NFL combine, in the 2010 NFL draft, Peek signed as a preferred free agent with the Atlanta Falcons. However, his agent later structured a medical release from the team during the 2010 season due to a playing-related injury.
