= 2009 SEC Championship Game =

- Conference Championship "Game of the Century"
- 2009 SEC Championship logo.
Florida Gators	Alabama Crimson Tide
(12–0)	(12–0)
13	32
Head coach: Urban Meyer	Head coach: Nick Saban
AP / Coaches / BCS; 1 / 1 / 1	AP / Coaches / BCS; 2 / 3 / 2
	1	2	3	4	Total
Florida	3	10	0	0	13
Alabama	9	10	7	6	32
- Date: December 5, 2009
- Season: 2009
- Stadium: Georgia Dome
- Location: Atlanta, Georgia
- MVP: QB Greg McElroy, Alabama
- Favorite: Florida by 5
- National anthem: The Pride of the Sunshine (Florida); Million Dollar Band (Alabama)
- Referee: Matt Austin
- Halftime show: Dr Pepper Throw for Scholarship Dough; The Pride of the Sunshine (Florida); Million Dollar Band (Alabama)
- Attendance: 75,514

United States TV coverage
- Network: CBS
- Announcers: Verne Lundquist (play-by-play); Gary Danielson (color); Tracy Wolfson (sideline)
- Nielsen ratings: 11.1/23 (17.969 million viewers)

2009 Southeastern Conference football standings
	Conf.			Overall
Team	W		L	W		L
Eastern Division
No. 3 Florida x%	8	–	0	13	–	1
Georgia	4	–	4	8	–	5
Tennessee	4	–	4	7	–	6
Kentucky	3	–	5	7	–	6
South Carolina	3	–	5	7	–	6
Vanderbilt	0	–	8	2	–	10
Western Division
No. 1 Alabama x$#	8	–	0	14	–	0
No. 17 LSU	5	–	3	9	–	4
No. 20 Ole Miss	4	–	4	9	–	4
Arkansas	3	–	5	8	–	5
Auburn	3	–	5	8	–	5
Mississippi State	3	–	5	5	–	7
Championship: Alabama 32, Florida 13
# – BCS National Champion; $ – BCS representative as conference champion; % – BCS at-large representative; x – Division champion/co-champions; Rankings from AP Poll

The 2009 SEC Championship Game was played on December 5, 2009, in the Georgia Dome in Atlanta, to determine the 2009 football champion of the Southeastern Conference (SEC). The game featured the Florida Gators and the Alabama Crimson Tide. The Crimson Tide was the designated "home team"; this home team, chosen on an alternating basis, was 2–4 in SEC Championship Games. The winner was all but assured to go on to play for a National Championship, in a likely matchup with the Texas Longhorns provided Texas won in the Big 12 Championship Game versus the north division champion Nebraska Cornhuskers. Entering the 2009 contest, the SEC East was 11–6 in SEC Championship games, with the Florida Gators accounting for seven of the eleven victories. Before the 2009 game, Alabama represented the SEC West six times in the conference championship game, compiling a 2–4 record, and had faced the Gators in all six of their previous SEC Championship game appearances. This was the first and so far the only time any conference championship game had featured two undefeated teams and was also the first time an AP Poll No. 1 played a No. 2 outside of the BCS Championship Game since the top-ranked Ohio State beat the second-ranked Michigan during the 2006 regular season. Due to this, it was referred to as a "Game of the Century.”

The game began at 4:00 p.m. EST and was televised by CBS Sports, for the ninth straight season. The game was also streamed online at CBSSports.com and on mobile for customers subscribing to the MediaFLO service on CBS Sports Mobile.

Alabama defeated Florida 32–13 and as expected secured a berth to the 2010 BCS National Championship Game where they would go on to defeat Texas. This game is often considered the moment when the Alabama dynasty began in earnest after a disappointing 2007 season and a loss to the same Tebow-led Gators in the 2008 SEC Championship.

== Scoring summary ==
Quarter	Time	Drive		Team	Scoring Information	Score	
Quarter	Time	Length	Time	Team	Scoring Information	Florida	Alabama
1	10:37	9 plays, 47 yards	4:23	Alabama	Leigh Tiffin 48–yard field goal	0	3
1	5:33	8 plays, 76 yards	3:56	Alabama	Mark Ingram II 3–yard run, Leigh Tiffin kick no good	0	9
1	0:28	12 plays, 56 yards	5:05	Florida	Caleb Sturgis 48–yard field goal	3	9
2	6:03	12 plays, 68 yards	5:47	Alabama	Leigh Tiffin kick good	3	12
2	4:31	4 plays, 70 yards	1:32	Florida	David Nelson 23–yard reception from Tim Tebow, Caleb Sturgis kick good	10	12
2	3:32	2 plays, 72 yards	0:59	Alabama	Mark Ingram 3–yard run, Leigh Tiffin kick good	10	19
2	1:18	5 plays, 65 yards	2:14	Florida	Caleb Sturgis 32–yard field goal	13	19
3	9:53	5 plays, 74 yards	2:48	Alabama	Colin Peek 17–yard reception from Greg McElroy, Leigh Tiffin kick good	13	26
4	13:49	17 plays, 88 yards	8:47	Alabama	Mark Ingram 1–yard run, two-point conversion no good	13	32
Final Score						13	32

== Uniforms ==
Alabama wore its standard home uniform, while Florida wore an all-white combination of its Nike Pro Combat helmet and its usual white uniform.
