= Mike Johnson (offensive lineman) =

American football player (born 1987)

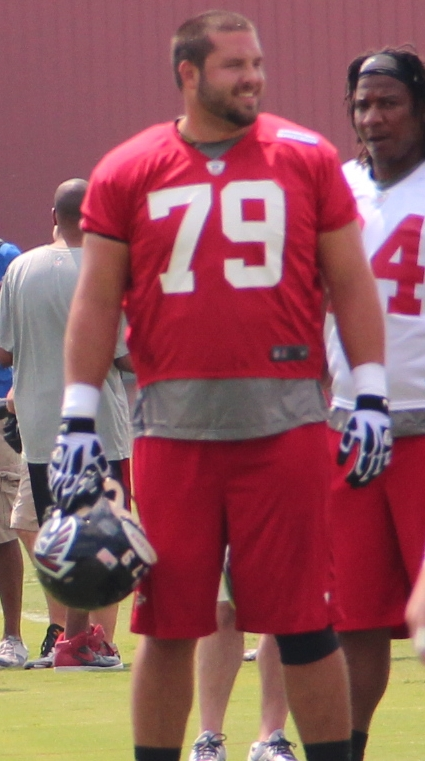
- Johnson in 2013

No. 79
- Position: Offensive guard / Offensive tackle

Personal information
- Born: April 2, 1987 (age 39); Pensacola, Florida, U.S.
- Listed height: 6 ft 6 in (1.98 m)
- Listed weight: 304 lb (138 kg)

Career information
- High school: Pine Forest (Pensacola)
- College: Alabama
- NFL draft: 2010: 3rd round, 98th overall pick

Career history
- Atlanta Falcons (2010–2014)

Awards and highlights
- BCS national champion (2010); Consensus All-American (2009); First-team All-American (2008); First-team All-SEC (2009); Second-team All-SEC (2008)

Career NFL statistics
- Games played: 18
- Games started: 1
- Stats at Pro Football Reference

Michael P. Johnson (born April 2, 1987) is an American former professional football player who was an offensive lineman in the National Football League (NFL). He played college football for the Alabama Crimson Tide, earning consensus All-American honors in 2009. The Atlanta Falcons chose him in the third round of the 2010 NFL draft.

== Early life ==
Johnson was born in Pensacola, Florida. He attended Pine Forest High School in Pensacola, where he achieved a perfect 4.0 GPA and scored a 27 on the ACT exam. He played high school football for the Pine Forest Eagles. Considered a four-star recruit by Rivals.com, Johnson was listed as the No. 17 offensive tackle prospect in the nation.

== College career ==
Johnson attended the University of Alabama, where he played for coach Nick Saban's Alabama Crimson Tide football team from 2006 to 2009. He earned first-team All-American honors from Pro Football Weekly in 2008. The following year, Johnson was named a consensus first-team All-American and was a member of Alabama's first national championship team in 17 years.

== Professional career ==
Pre-draft measurables
Height	Weight	Arm length	Hand span	40-yard dash	10-yard split	20-yard split	20-yard shuttle	Three-cone drill	Vertical jump	Broad jump	Bench press
6 ft 5 1/4 in (1.96 m)	312 lb (142 kg)	32 1/2 in (0.83 m)	9 3/4 in (0.25 m)	5.31 s	1.82 s	3.04 s	5.01 s	8.15 s	25.0 in (0.64 m)	7 ft 7 in (2.31 m)	21 reps
All values from NFL Combine/Pro Day

Johnson was selected 98th overall in the third round of the 2010 NFL draft by the Atlanta Falcons. On June 19, the Falcons signed Johnson to a deal. He played two games in 2011 spending most of the season on injured reserve. He played 16 games in 2012 as the second string guard and a blocking tight end on goal line/short yardage situations. Johnson, who went into the preseason as the projected starter at right tackle, suffered a fractured fibula and dislocated left ankle on August 6, 2013, and was placed on injured reserve three days later.

Johnson retired from the NFL before the 2015 season began and several months after being released from the Falcons.
