= A-Day (University of Alabama) =

Annual football exhibition

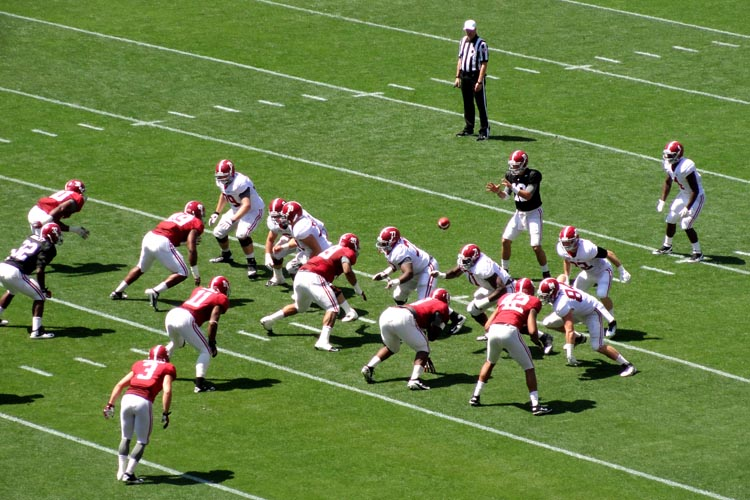
A. J. McCarron takes a snap for the White team during the 2013 A-Day Game.

A-Day is an annual college football exhibition game set at the conclusion of spring practice by the University of Alabama Crimson Tide. Played on-campus at Bryant–Denny Stadium in Tuscaloosa, Alabama, the game features teams composed of offensive starters against defensive starters of the Crimson Tide. National Collegiate Athletic Association (NCAA) rules allow for member schools to conduct a series of fifteen practice sessions during the spring months. As part of these practices the NCAA allows three 11-on-11 scrimmages, one of which may be conducted as a spring game.

Prior to the game, the captains from the previous seasons' team are honored at the annual "Walk of Fame" ceremony at the base of Denny Chimes. In addition to this ceremony, several other memorable events have occurred as part of the annual A-Day festivities. The 1967 edition of the game saw Dock Rone and Andrew Pernell participate and become the first African American players to play at Denny Stadium as members of the Crimson Tide football team. At halftime of the 1976 game, Denny Stadium was officially rededicated as Bryant–Denny Stadium in honor of then head coach Bear Bryant. The 1985 edition of the A-Day game featured a White team of current, varsity starters against a Crimson team of former Alabama players such as Ken Stabler and Ozzie Newsome.

Since the arrival of head coach Nick Saban in 2007, A-Day has become a major event. The 2007 game saw an overflow crowd of 92,138 in attendance and served as the catalyst for other programs to make their spring game a larger event. The growth of A-Day has resulted in its being televised nationally by ESPN first in 2009 and again in subsequent years in addition to being utilized to enhance recruiting.

== History ==
Originally, the A-Day game was called the Red and White Game and was played on Alumni Day. Alumni Day was a day devoted to alumni and typically consisted of coffees, luncheons, tours, the football game, and an alumni dinner. Recently, there has been an alumni flag football game inside the Bryant-Denny Stadium preceding the A-Day game.

== Key ==
W	White team win
C	Crimson team win
T	Tie

== Games ==
List of A-Day games showing season played in, score, date, MVP and attendance
Season (Note: Links to the season article for the Alabama team that played in the A-Day for that year. The game was not played in the 1991, 1996, or 2020 seasons.)	Score (Note: Results are sortable first by whether the result was a Crimson or White team win and then second by the margin of victory.)	Date	MVP (Note: Links to the winner of the Dixie Howell Memorial Award, presented annually to the outstanding player of the game as selected by the media since 1971.)	Attendance	Reference
1946	W 18–6	March 30, 1946	—	24,000 (Note: The 1946, 1987 and 1988 editions of the A-Day game were played at Legion Field in Birmingham, Alabama.)	
1947	C 13–7	March 15, 1947	—	12,000	
1948	W 20–7	March 13, 1948	—	12,000	
1949	C 14–0	March 12, 1949	—	10,000	
1950	W 12–0	March 11, 1950	—	10,000	
1951	W 22–7	March 9, 1951	—	15,000	
1952	C 41–26	March 8, 1952	—	—	
1953	W 13–6	March 14, 1953	—	7,500	
1954	W 20–13	March 20, 1954 (Note: The 1954 A-Day game was originally scheduled to be played on March 13, but was postponed for a week due to poor field conditions at Denny Stadium as a result of heavy rains.)	—	4,000	
1955	C 12–7	March 12, 1955	—	—	
1956	W 26–0	March 10, 1956	—	—	
1957	C 21–0	March 9, 1957	—	—	
1958	W 13–0	April 26, 1958	—	—	
1959	C 14–3	April 11, 1959	—	15,000	
1960	C 38–0	April 30, 1960	—	—	
1961	C 17–7	April 22, 1961	—	—	
1962	W 15–14	May 19, 1962	—	—	
1963	W 17–6	May 11, 1963	—	14,000	
1964	C 17–6	May 8, 1964	—	14,500	
1965	C 67–36	May 8, 1965	—	13,000	
1966	C 17–15	April 23, 1966	—	15,000	
1967	C 13–3	May 5, 1967	—	15,000	
1968	W 17–7	May 4, 1968	—	12,000	
1969	W 27–25	May 10, 1969	—	17,000	
1970	W 40–39	April 18, 1970	—	17,000	
1971	W 21–15	May 1, 1971	Steve Dean	15,000	
1972	W 24–7	April 22, 1972	Wayne Wheeler	20,000	
1973	W 21–16	April 21, 1973	Mike Washington	5,000	
1974	C 17–14	April 20, 1974	Conley Duncan	15,000	
1975	C 21–13	April 12, 1975	Johnny Davis	15,000	
1976	C 14–11	April 10, 1976	Ozzie Newsome	10,000	
1977	W 27–23	April 16, 1977	Tony Nathan	10,000	
1978	T 7–7	April 22, 1978	Keith Pugh	7,000	
1979	W 21–0	April 14, 1979	Alan Gray	7,500	
1980	W 16–14	April 12, 1980	Johnny Brooker	8,000	
1981	C 31–13	April 11, 1981	Ken Simon	8,500	
1982	W 17–0	April 17, 1982	Walter Lewis	11,500	
1983	W 14–11	April 16, 1983	Jon Hand	16,000	
1984	W 7–3	April 14, 1984	Brent Sowell	16,000	
1985	W 20–7	April 20, 1985	Don McClain	28,000	
1986	W 20–0	April 19, 1986	Angelo Stafford	20,435	
1987	W 20–10	April 25, 1987	Kerry Goode	32,000	
1988	W 28–16	April 9, 1988	Vince Sutton	51,117	
1989	C 28–14	April 8, 1989	Jeff Dunn	16,500	
1990	W 42–12	April 21, 1990	Danny Woodson	12,500	
1992	C 13–7	April 11, 1992	Jeremy Nunley	35,016	
1993	C 27–19	April 17, 1993	Brian Burgdorf	30,000	
1994	C 17–6	April 16, 1994	Brian Steger	46,700	
1995	W 16–10	April 15, 1995	Toderick Malone	37,323	
1997	W 9–5	April 19, 1997	Michael Vaughn	30,212	
1998	W 65–24	April 18, 1998	Montoya Madden	8,968	
1999	W 23–10	April 17, 1999	Jason McAddley	32,500	
2000	C 17–12	April 15, 2000	Ahmaad Galloway	25,355	
2001	C 10–7	April 14, 2001	Jonathan Richey	35,000	
2002	C 20–6	April 13, 2002	Ahmaad Galloway	37,000	
2003	C 47–0	March 29, 2003	Brodie Croyle	34,000	
2004	W 21–0	March 19, 2004	Tim Castille	35,000	
2005	W 20–18	March 19, 2005	John Parker Wilson	25,000	
2006	W 17–3	April 1, 2006	D. J. Hall	40,000	
2007	W 20–13	April 21, 2007	D. J. Hall	92,138	
2008	C 24–14	April 12, 2008	Terry Grant	78,200	
2009	C 14–7	April 18, 2009	Marquis Maze; Greg McElroy	84,050	
2010	W 23–17	April 17, 2010	Mark Ingram, Jr.	91,312	
2011	C 14–10	April 16, 2011	Trent Richardson	92,310	
2012	W 24–15	April 14, 2012	T. J. Yeldon	78,526	
2013	W 17–14	April 20, 2013	T. J. Yeldon	78,315	
2014	W 17–13	April 19, 2014	T. J. Yeldon	73,506	
2015	W 27–14	April 18, 2015	Robert Foster; ArDarius Stewart	65,175	
2016	W 7–3	April 16, 2016	Damien Harris	76,212	
2017	C 27–24	April 22, 2017	Jerry Jeudy	74,326	
2018	C 24–12	April 21, 2018	Mac Jones; Joseph Bulovas	74,732	
2019	W 31–17	April 13, 2019	John Metchie III	62,219	
2021	W 13–10	April 17, 2021	Bryce Young	47,218	
2022	W 25–7	April 16, 2022	Jahmyr Gibbs	31,077	
2023	C 30–21	April 22, 2023	Malachi Moore	58,710	
2024	W 34–28	April 13, 2024	Jam Miller	72,358	
2026		April 11, 2026			
