= 2007 Alabama Crimson Tide football team =

American college football season

2007 Alabama Crimson Tide football

Independence Bowl champion

Independence Bowl, W 30–24 vs. Colorado
- Conference: Southeastern Conference
- Western Division
- Record: 2–6, 5 wins vacated (1–4 SEC, 3 wins vacated)
- Head coach: Nick Saban (1st season)
- Offensive coordinator: Major Applewhite (1st season)
- Offensive scheme: Pro-style
- Defensive coordinator: Kevin Steele (1st season)
- Base defense: 3–4
- Captains: Antoine Caldwell; Rashad Johnson; Darren Mustin
- Home stadium: Bryant–Denny Stadium

2007 Southeastern Conference football standings
	Conf.			Overall
Team	W		L	W		L
Eastern Division
No. 12 Tennessee xy	6	–	2	10	–	4
No. 2 Georgia x%	6	–	2	11	–	2
No. 13 Florida	5	–	3	9	–	4
South Carolina	3	–	5	6	–	6
Kentucky	3	–	5	8	–	5
Vanderbilt	2	–	6	5	–	7
Western Division
No. 1 LSU x$#	6	–	2	12	–	2
No. 15 Auburn	5	–	3	9	–	4
Arkansas	4	–	4	8	–	5
Mississippi State	4	–	4	8	–	5
Alabama	4	–	4	7	–	6
Ole Miss	0	–	8	3	–	9
Championship: LSU 21, Tennessee 14
# – BCS National Champion; $ – BCS representative as conference champion; % – BCS at-large representative; x – Division champion/co-champions; y – Championship game participant; Alabama had 5 victories vacated by the NCAA in 2010. As such, the official record for Alabama is 2–6 (1–4).; Rankings from AP Poll

The 2007 Alabama Crimson Tide football team represented the University of Alabama as a member of the Southeastern Conference (SEC) during the 2007 NCAA Division I FBS football season. Led by first-year head coach Nick Saban, the Crimson Tide compiled an overall record of 7–6 with a mark of 4–4 in conference play, placing in a three-way tie for third in the SEC's Western Division. Alabama was invited to the Independence Bowl, where the Crimson Tide defeated Colorado. The team played home games at Bryant–Denny Stadium in Tuscaloosa, Alabama.

Despite a strong 6–2 start, Alabama finished the regular season with four straight defeats, including a loss for a sixth-straight year to rival Auburn. In 2009, the National Collegiate Athletic Association (NCAA) levied sanctions against Alabama, forcing the Crimson Tide to vacate five wins, including three conference victories, from the season.

== Schedule ==
The Sagarin computer ratings calculated Alabama's strength of schedule to be the 31st most difficult out of the 245 Division I teams. The Cosgrove Computer Rankings calculated it as the 55th most difficult out of the 119 Division I FBS teams in its rankings. Alabama's 2007 schedule was officially released on July 24, 2006. It featured six pre-season AP Top 25 teams, eight of which made bowl games in 2006.

In accordance with conference rules, Alabama faced all five Western Division opponents: Arkansas, Auburn, LSU, Mississippi State, and Ole Miss. They also faced three Eastern Division opponents: official SEC rival Tennessee, Georgia, and Vanderbilt. Alabama did not play SEC opponents Florida, Kentucky and South Carolina. Alabama also played four non-conference games. The non-conference schedule included games against Western Carolina of the Southern Conference, Florida State of the Atlantic Coast Conference, Houston of Conference USA and Louisiana–Monroe of the Sun Belt Conference. For the 2007 Independence Bowl, Alabama played Colorado of the Big 12 Conference.

Date	Time	Opponent	Rank	Site	TV	Result	Attendance	Source
September 1	6:00 p.m.	Western Carolina*		Bryant–Denny Stadium; Tuscaloosa, AL	PPV	W 52–6 (vacated)	92,138	
September 8	11:30 a.m.	at Vanderbilt		Vanderbilt Stadium; Nashville, TN	LFS	W 24–10 (vacated)	39,773	
September 15	5:45 p.m.	No. 16 Arkansas		Bryant–Denny Stadium; Tuscaloosa, AL	ESPN	W 41–38 (vacated)	92,138	
September 22	6:45 p.m.	No. 22 Georgia	No. 16	Bryant–Denny Stadium; Tuscaloosa, AL (rivalry, College GameDay)	ESPN	L 23–26 ^{OT}	92,138	
September 29	4:00 p.m.	vs. Florida State*	No. 22	Jacksonville Municipal Stadium; Jacksonville, FL	CBS	L 14–21	85,412	
October 6	2:00 p.m.	Houston*^{†}		Bryant–Denny Stadium; Tuscaloosa, AL	PPV	W 30–24 (vacated)	92,138	
October 13	11:30 a.m.	at Ole Miss		Vaught–Hemingway Stadium; Oxford, MS (rivalry)	LFS	W 27–24 (vacated)	59,791	
October 20	11:30 a.m.	No. 20 Tennessee		Bryant–Denny Stadium; Tuscaloosa, AL (Third Saturday in October)	LFS	W 41–17	92,138	
November 3	4:00 p.m.	No. 3 LSU	No. 17	Bryant–Denny Stadium; Tuscaloosa, AL (rivalry)	CBS	L 34–41	92,138	
November 10	11:30 a.m.	at Mississippi State	No. 21	Davis Wade Stadium; Starkville, MS (rivalry)	LFS	L 12–17	56,188	
November 17	1:30 p.m.	Louisiana–Monroe*		Bryant–Denny Stadium; Tuscaloosa, AL	PPV	L 14–21	92,138	
November 24	7:00 p.m.	at No. 25 Auburn		Jordan-Hare Stadium; Auburn, AL (Iron Bowl)	ESPN	L 10–17	87,451	
December 30	7:00 p.m.	vs. Colorado*		Independence Stadium; Shreveport, LA (Independence Bowl)	ESPN	W 30–24	47,043	
*Non-conference game; ^{†}Homecoming; Rankings from AP Poll released prior to the game; All times are in Central time

== Rankings ==
Ranking movements Legend: ██ Increase in ranking ██ Decrease in ranking — = Not ranked RV = Received votes
	Week															
Poll	Pre	1	2	3	4	5	6	7	8	9	10	11	12	13	14	Final
AP	RV	RV	RV	16	22	RV	RV	RV	22	17	21	RV	—	—	—	—
Coaches	RV	RV	RV	20	24	RV	RV	RV	24	18	23	—	—	—	—	—
Harris	Not released				22	RV	RV	RV	24	17	22	RV	—	—	—	Not released
BCS	Not released							—	24	17	22	—	—	—	—	Not released

== Before the season ==
The Crimson Tide completed a 6–6 regular season record. Following their loss to Auburn in the Iron Bowl, head coach Mike Shula was fired on November 27, after four years. Athletic director Mal Moore announced defensive coordinator Joe Kines as interim head coach for the Independence Bowl, against Oklahoma State, which the Tide lost 34–31, finishing with a 6–7 record.

=== Returning starters ===
Eighteen starters returned from the previous season, including nine on offense, five on defense, and four on special teams. The most notable departures were Kenneth Darby and Le'Ron McClain on offense, and Dominic Lee, Jeremy Clark, Juwan Simpson, Terrence Jones, Jeffrey Dukes, and Ramzee Robinson on defense.

The Crimson Tide offense returned all three quarterbacks, including starter John Parker Wilson. The entire starting offensive line returned, anchored by freshman All-American Andre Smith, along with reinforcements by the top four tight ends from the 2006 depth chart. Alabama's receiving unit was led by D. J. Hall, who broke nearly every Alabama-receiving record in school history in 2006. The Alabama defense returned five starters in 2007, based on the 3–3–5 scheme that was run in 2006. The Tide had a new starting nose tackle, outside linebacker, strongside linebacker, cornerback, and a starting safety.

Offense

Player	Class	Position
John Parker Wilson	Junior	Quarterback
Keith Brown	Senior	Wide receiver
D. J. Hall	Senior	Wide receiver
Travis McCall	Senior	Tight end
Andre Smith	Sophomore	Offensive tackle
Chris Capps	Senior	Offensive tackle
Justin Britt	Senior	Offensive guard
B. J. Stabler	Junior	Offensive guard
Antoine Caldwell	Junior	Center

Defense

Player	Class	Position
Keith Saunders	Senior	Defensive end
Wallace Gilberry	Senior	Defensive end
Jay Callahan Jr	Sophomore	Linebacker
Simeon Castille	Senior	Cornerback
Marcus Carter	Senior	Safety

Special teams

Player	Class	Position
P. J. Fitzgerald	Sophomore	Punter
Jamie Christensen	Senior	Placekicker
Leigh Tiffin	Sophomore	Placekicker
Javier Arenas	Sophomore	Return specialist
Brian Selman	Sophomore	Long snapper

== Game summaries ==
=== Western Carolina ===
Team	1	2	3	4	Total
Western Carolina	0	3	0	3	6
• Alabama	14	10	14	14	52

- Location: Tuscaloosa, Alabama
- Game start: 6:07 p.m.
- Elapsed time: 3:17
- Game attendance: 92,138
- Game weather: 89°, partly cloudy, winds ENE at 5 mph
- Referee: Matt Austin
- TV announcers (CTSN PPV): Chris Stewart (play-by-play), Tyler Watts (color), Barry Krauss (sideline)

The Nick Saban era commenced before a sold-out, home crowd of 92,138 by defeating the Western Carolina Catamounts 52–6 for both Nick Saban's first regular season game and victory as Alabama's head coach. Redshirt freshman running back Terry Grant scored the first touchdown of the season, on the first offensive play of the game, with a 47-yard touchdown run. Grant then scored his second touchdown on a one-yard run to give Alabama a 14–0 lead at the end of the first quarter. After a successful, 34-yard Jonathon Parsons field goal by the Catamounts, Grant scored his third touchdown of the evening on a 21-yard run. Leigh Tiffin then hit a 21-yard field goal to give Alabama a 24–3 halftime lead.

Bama continued the scoring in the third quarter with another pair of touchdowns. The first came on a one-yard Glen Coffee run and the second on a one-yard touchdown pass from Greg McElroy to Nick Walker. After a second Parsons field goal for Western Carolina, Alabama scored touchdowns on a one-yard Jimmy Johns run and a 25-yard Roy Upchurch run to make the final score 52–6. For his 134-yard, three touchdown performance, Terry Grant was named the SEC Freshman of the Week.

=== Vanderbilt ===
Team	1	2	3	4	Total
• Alabama	10	6	0	8	24
Vanderbilt	3	0	0	7	10

- Location: Nashville, Tennessee
- Game start: 11:34 a.m.
- Elapsed time: 3:11
- Game attendance: 39,773
- Game weather: 82°, cloudy, winds S at 6 mph
- Referee: Rocky Goode
- Television network: LFS

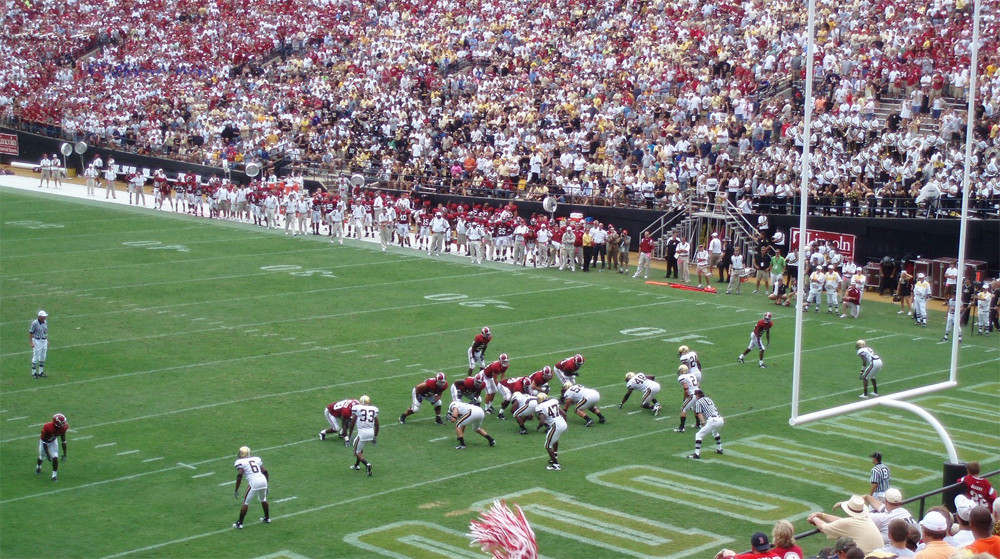
Alabama attempts a two-point conversion in the fourth quarter

For the 19th consecutive time, stretching back to the 1984 season, Alabama defeated the Vanderbilt Commodores to open conference play. In this contest, the Crimson Tide were victorious before a sold-out crowd of 39,773 at Vanderbilt Stadium 24–10 for Nick Saban's first conference victory as Alabama's head coach. After Javier Arenas returned the first punt of the game 69-yards to the one-yard line, for the second week in a row Terry Grant scored a touchdown on Alabama's first offensive play with his one-yard run. Leigh Tiffin hit a 20-yard field goal later in the quarter as did the Commodores' Bryant Hahnfeldt from 33 yards to make the score 10–3 at the end of the first. A pair of Tiffin field goals from 40 and 29 yards extended Bama's lead to 16–3 at the half.

After being held scoreless in the third quarter, Grant scored his second touchdown of the afternoon on a two-yard run early in the fourth quarter. With a successful two-point conversion pass from John Parker Wilson to Nick Walker, Alabama extended their lead to 24–3. Vanderbilt did score a late touchdown on a 15-yard Adams Mackenzi pass to George Smith to make the finals score 24–10. For his 173-yard, two touchdown performance, and for the second consecutive week, Terry Grant was named the SEC Freshman of the Week. The victory improved Alabama's all-time record against the Commodores to 58–19–4 (61–18–4 without NCAA vacations and forfeits).

=== Arkansas ===
Team	1	2	3	4	Total
#16 Arkansas	0	10	7	21	38
• Alabama	21	0	10	10	41

- Location: Tuscaloosa, Alabama
- Game start: 5:58 p.m.
- Elapsed time: 3:42
- Game attendance: 92,138
- Game weather: 74°, clear, winds N at 8 mph
- Referee: Penn Wagers
- TV announcers (ESPN): Mike Patrick (play-by-play), Todd Blackledge (analyst), Holly Rowe (sideline)

In what was considered their first true test of the season, Alabama built an early 21-point lead but had to mount a come-from-behind drive in the final two minutes of the game in order to capture a 41–38 victory against the Arkansas Razorbacks. Bama took a 21–0 lead into the second quarter after a pair of D. J. Hall touchdown receptions of nine and 35 yards from John Parker Wilson and a 14-yard Glen Coffee run. The Razorbacks closed the gap to 21–10 at the half after Casey Dick threw a 40-yard touchdown pass to Crosby Tuck and Alex Tejada converted a 22-yard field goal.

Alabama extended their lead to 31–10 in the third quarter after a 24-yard Leigh Tiffin field goal and a two-yard Wilson touchdown pass to Nick Walker. From this point, Arkansas scored four touchdowns to take a 38–31 lead late into the fourth quarter. Dick hit Andrew Davie for a two-yard touchdown reception late in the third. In the fourth Darren McFadden scored on runs of one and five yards on consecutive drives, and Peyton Hillis had a seven-yard touchdown reception to give the Razorbacks a 38–31 lead with 8:08 remaining in the game. Tiffin converted a 42-yard field goal and with 4:20 remaining in the game and then with only 0:08 remaining Wilson hit Matt Caddell for a four-yard, game-winning touchdown reception.

With his 172 yards receiving, D. J. Hall set a new Crimson Tide record for career receiving yardage previously held by Ozzie Newsome with 2,070 yards. The victory improved Alabama's all-time record against the Razorbacks to 8–8 (11–7 without NCAA vacations and forfeits).

=== Georgia ===
Team	1	2	3	4	OT	Total
• #22 Georgia	7	3	7	3	6	26
#16 Alabama	0	3	7	10	3	23

- Location: Tuscaloosa, Alabama
- Game start: 6:47 p.m.
- Elapsed time: 3:34
- Game attendance: 92,138
- Game weather: 88°, partly cloudy, winds ESE at 9 mph
- Referee: Jeff Roberson
- TV announcers (ESPN): Mike Patrick (play-by-play), Todd Blackledge (analyst), Holly Rowe (sideline)

A week after upsetting Arkansas and entering both the AP and Coaches' Polls, Alabama was defeated in overtime by the Georgia Bulldogs 26–23. The Crimson Tide found themselves trailing 7–0 early in the first quarter after a 10-yard touchdown pass from Matthew Stafford to Thomas Brown. Brandon Coutu and Leigh Tiffin each added a field goal in the second quarter for their respective teams to give the Bulldogs a lead 10–3 at halftime.

In the third quarter, Alabama's John Parker Wilson scrambled for a one-yard touchdown run, but the Bulldogs immediately answered on their next drive with a six-yard rushing touchdown from Knowshon Moreno. Coutu connected on a 47-yard field goal, as the Bulldogs extended their lead in the fourth quarter to 20–10. Alabama responded with 22-yard Tiffin field goal and a second rushing touchdown from Wilson, to force overtime. On their first possession of overtime, Alabama failed to move the football and Leigh Tiffin connected on a 42-yard field goal. As for Georgia, Stafford connected on a 25-yard pass to Mikey Henderson, on their first offensive play in overtime, and the Bulldogs left Tuscaloosa 26–23 overtime winners. The loss brought Alabama's all-time record against the Bulldogs to 35–25–4.

This would be the last time Alabama lost to Georgia until the 2022 national championship game.

=== Florida State ===
River City Showdown

Team	1	2	3	4	Total
#22 Alabama	0	0	0	14	14
• Florida State	0	0	7	14	21

- Location: Jacksonville, Florida
- Game start: 5:01 p.m.
- Elapsed time: 3:44
- Game attendance: 85,412
- Game weather: 83°, partly cloudy, winds NNE 19–27 mph
- Referee: Thomas Ritter
- TV announcers (CBS): Verne Lundquist (play-by-play), Gary Danielson (color), Tracy Wolfson (sideline)

In what was Alabama's first regular season game played at a neutral site since the Kickoff Classic in 1986, Alabama was defeated in the inaugural River City Showdown at Jacksonville, Florida by the Florida State Seminoles 21–14. After a scoreless first half, the Seminoles got on the board first in the third quarter. Florida State scored on their first play of the second half when Xavier Lee connected with De'Cody Fagg for a seven-yard touchdown reception. The Seminoles extended their lead to 14–0 early in the fourth quarter on a five-yard Antone Smith touchdown run.

Alabama scored their first points of the evening late in the fourth quarter when John Parker Wilson threw a seven-yard touchdown pass to D. J. Hall to cut the Florida State lead to 14–7. On the Seminoles' next offensive possession when Lee threw a 70-yard touchdown pass to Fagg and extended their lead to 21–7. The Crimson Tide then cut the lead after Wilson hit Keith Brown for a 17-yard touchdown reception. However, Alabama was unable to recover the onside kick on the ensuing kickoff and lost by the final score of 21–14.

The 85,412 fans at the game set the attendance record for Jacksonville Municipal Stadium, exceeding numbers of Super Bowl XXXIX or any of the annual Florida–Georgia rivalry games. It was the first time the teams had met since 1974, and it was the first meeting since Birmingham, Alabama native Bobby Bowden took over as head coach of the Seminoles. The loss brought Alabama's all-time record against the Seminoles to 2–1–1.

=== Houston ===
Team	1	2	3	4	Total
Houston	0	7	3	14	24
• Alabama	23	0	7	0	30

- Location: Tuscaloosa, Alabama
- Game start: 2:07 p.m.
- Elapsed time: 3:30
- Game attendance: 92,138
- Game weather: 87°, sunny, winds ENE 7 mph
- Referee: Marc Curles
- TV announcers (CTSN PPV): Chris Stewart (play-by-play), Tyler Watts (color), Barry Krauss (sideline)

Coming on the heels of two consecutive losses, the Crimson Tide defeated the Houston Cougars on homecoming in Tuscaloosa 30–24. After the first quarter, Alabama led Houston 23–0 after scoring a trio of touchdowns and a safety. John Parker Wilson scored the first touchdown of the afternoon on a one-yard run to cap the opening, 13 play, 80-yard drive. On the ensuing Cougar drive, Wallace Gilberry sacked Houston quarterback Blake Joseph for a safety and a 9–0 Alabama lead. The Crimson Tide then closed the first quarter with a pair of Wilson touchdown passes to take a 23–0 lead into the second quarter. The first came on a 23-yard pass to Nikita Stover and the second on a 23-yard pass to Mike McCoy.

Holding Alabama scoreless in the second quarter, before halftime Houston managed to score their first touchdown on a 68-yard Joseph pass to Donnie Avery to make the halftime score 23–7. A 34-yard Houston field goal in the third quarter made the score 23–10 before Alabama scored its final touchdown on a four-yard Glen Coffee run to make it 30–10. The game appeared over going into the fourth quarter, but Houston attempted a comeback by scoring two touchdowns to come within six points of the Tide. Houston scored a pair of touchdowns in the fourth on a two-yard Case Keenum run and a 30-yard Keenum pass to Anthony Alridge to cut the score to 30–24. On the last play of the game, Houston almost scored another touchdown to win the game, but an interception in the endzone by Simeon Castille sealed the victory for Bama. For his eleven tackle, two sack performance, Wallace Gilberry was named SEC Defensive Line Player of the Week. The victory improved Alabama's all-time record against the Cougars to 9–0 (10–0 without NCAA vacations).

=== Ole Miss ===
Alabama–Ole Miss football rivalry

Team	1	2	3	4	Total
• Alabama	3	14	0	10	27
Ole Miss	7	3	14	0	24

- Location: Oxford, Mississippi
- Game start: 11:34 a.m.
- Elapsed time: 3:34
- Game attendance: 59,791
- Game weather: 70°, sunny, winds SE 4 mph
- Referee: Penn Wagers
- TV announcers (LFS): Dave Neal (play-by-play), Dave Archer (analyst), Dave Baker (sideline reporter)

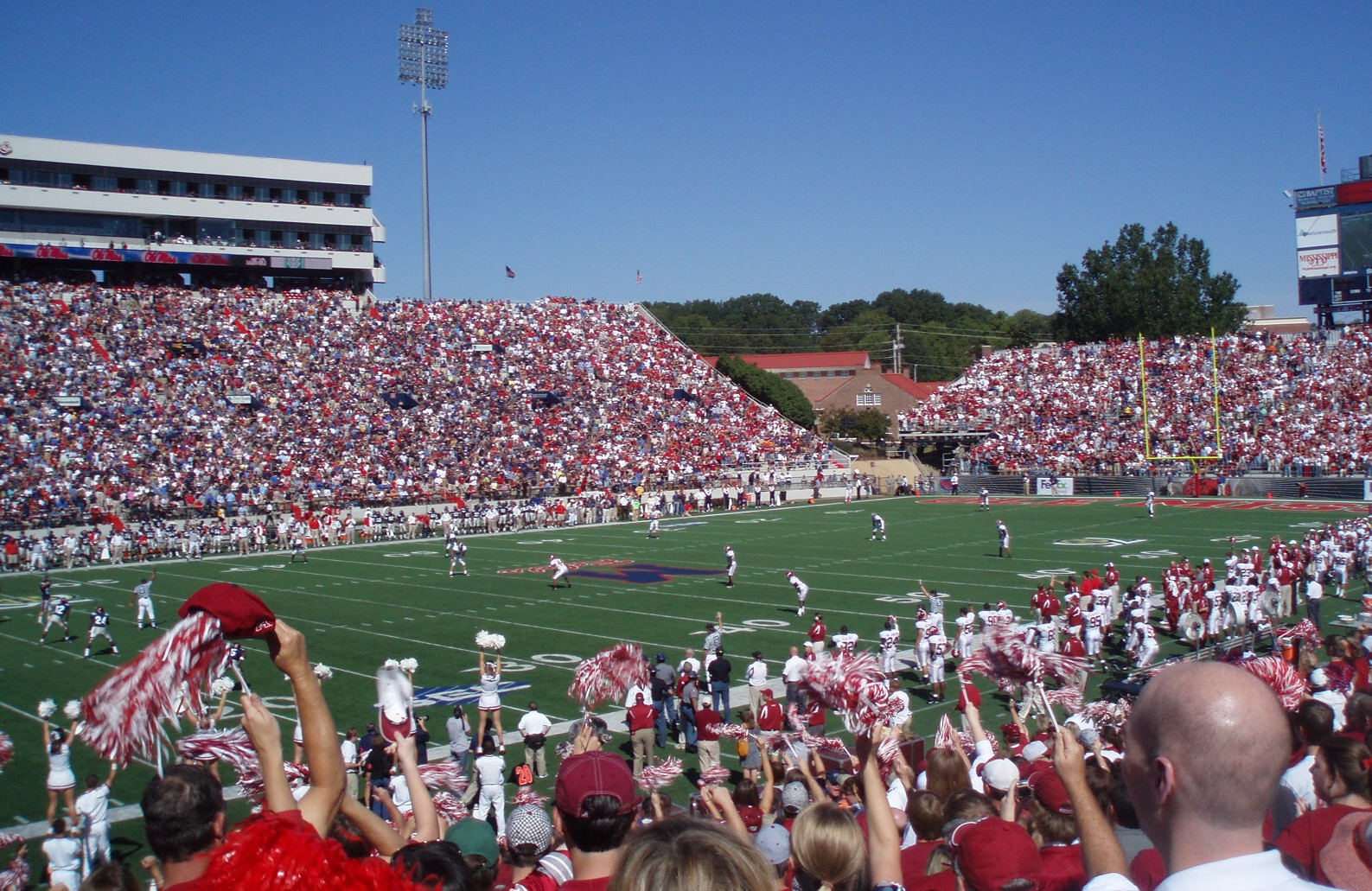
Kickoff against the Rebels

In an unexpected offensive showcase, the Alabama managed to defeat the Ole Miss Rebels 27–24 in Oxford. Leigh Tiffin opened the scoring with a 27-yard field goal to give the Crimson Tide a 3–0 lead. The Rebels responded with an eight-yard Dexter McCluster touchdown reception from Seth Adams to take a 7–3 lead at the end of the first quarter. In the second quarter Alabama scored a pair of touchdowns with the first coming on a two-yard Glen Coffee run and the second on a one-yard John Parker Wilson run. Ole Miss added a 22-yard Joshua Shene field goal and Alabama was up 17–10 at the half.

Ole Miss took a 24–17 lead into the fourth quarter following a pair of touchdowns in the third. Adams scored on a three-yard run then connected with Mike Hicks for a 17-yard touchdown reception in the period. The Crimson Tide then mounted a fourth quarter comeback. Terry Grant scored on a three-yard run and Tiffin kicked the game-winning field goal from 24 yards with 5:14 remaining in the game. Ole Miss attempted to score on their last drive to either force the game into overtime with a field goal or win with a touchdown. With a fourth-and-22 on Alabama's 45-yard line, Adams completed a pass to Shay Hodge at the 3-yard line. However, the call was reviewed and then reversed after Nick Saban called a timeout to give the officials more time to look at the replay. John Parker Wilson was 26 for 40 and threw an interception and no touchdowns. The defense was able to force three interceptions on the day. The victory improved Alabama's all-time record against the Rebels to 41–9–2 (45–8–2 without NCAA vacations and forfeits).

=== Tennessee ===
Third Saturday in October

Team	1	2	3	4	Total
#20 Tennessee	7	10	0	0	17
• Alabama	10	14	6	11	41

- Location: Tuscaloosa, Alabama
- Game start: 11:34 a.m.
- Elapsed time: 3:26
- Game attendance: 92,138
- Game weather: 69°, sunny, winds N 2 mph
- Referee: Matt Austin
- TV announcers (LFS): Dave Neal (play-by-play), Dave Archer (analyst), Dave Baker (sideline reporter)

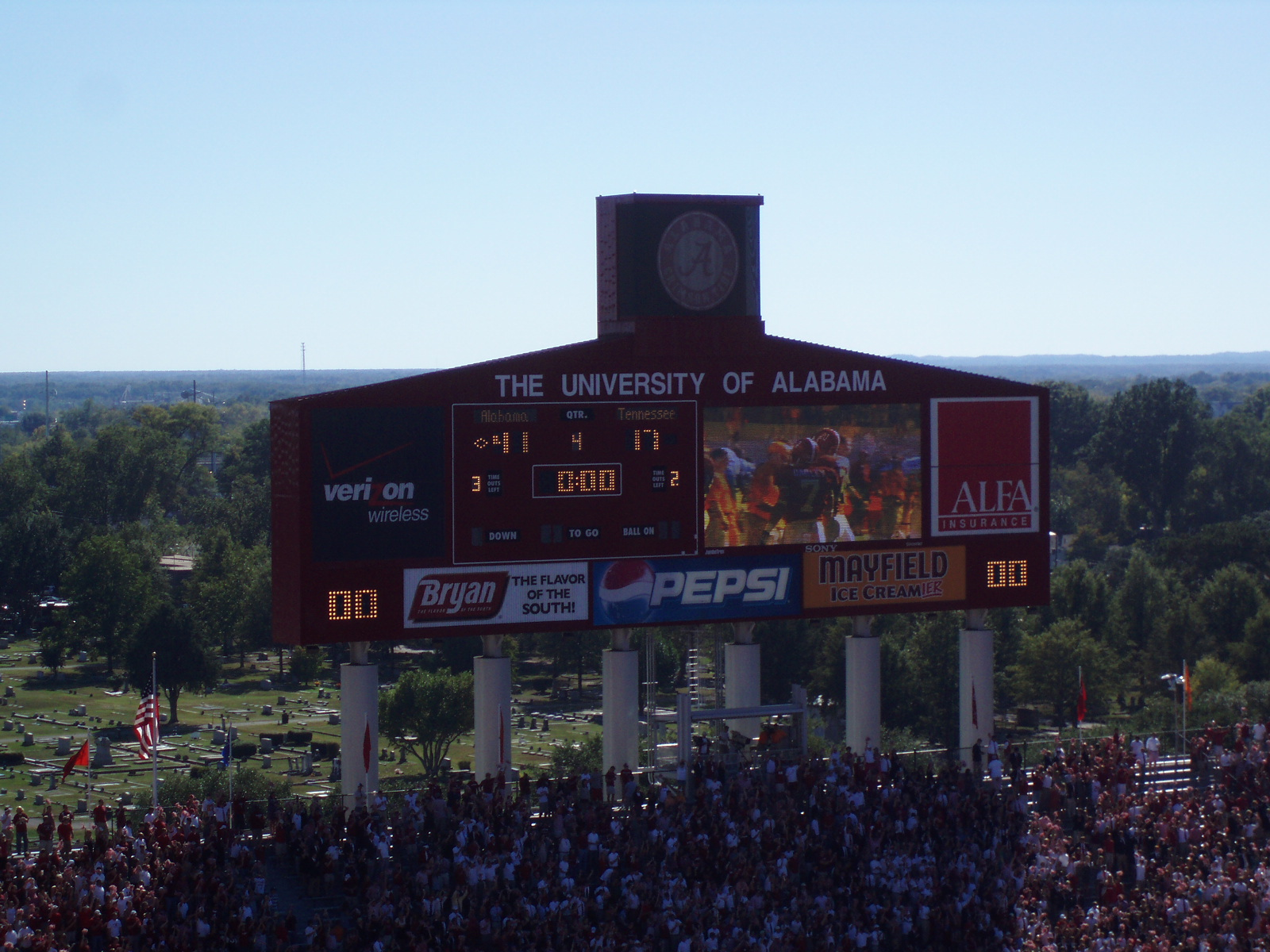
Final scoreboard

In their annual rivalry game, Alabama met the Tennessee Volunteers and was victorious 41–17 in Nick Saban's first "The Third Saturday in October" as head coach of Alabama. Saban elected to kick an onside kick on the opening kickoff that Alabama recovered. On the ensuing drive, Leigh Tiffin connected on a 39-yard field goal to give the Crimson Tide an early 3–0 lead. Bama extended their lead to 10–0 when John Parker Wilson connected with Terry Grant on a three-yard touchdown pass. The Volunteers scored their first points of the afternoon on the following drive on a two-yard Arian Foster run to make the score 10–7 entering the second quarter.

Tennessee took a 14–10 lead early in the second quarter after Erik Ainge threw a three-yard touchdown pass to Luke Stocker. At that point Alabama took over. D. J. Hall had two second-quarter touchdown receptions on John Parker Wilson passes of 16 and two yards . Daniel Lincoln then connected on a 45-yard field goal as time expired and Alabama led 24–17 at the half.

Tiffin added three more field goals to bring his total to four on the day in the second half, and Terry Grant had an eight-yard touchdown run in the fourth to give Alabama the 41–17 victory. D. J. Hall and John Parker Wilson had career days for Alabama. Hall had 13 receptions for 185 yards and two touchdowns. Wilson was 32-of-46 for 363 yards and three touchdowns. The victory improved Alabama's all-time record against Tennessee to 44–38–7 (45–37–8 without NCAA vacations and forfeits).

=== LSU ===
Alabama–LSU football rivalry

Team	1	2	3	4	Total
• #3 LSU	10	7	7	17	41
#17 Alabama	3	17	7	7	34

- Location: Tuscaloosa, Alabama
- Game start: 4:07 p.m.
- Elapsed time: 4:13
- Game attendance: 92,138
- Game weather: 69°, sunny, winds NNW 10 mph
- Referee: Thomas Ritter
- TV announcers (CBS): Verne Lundquist, Gary Danielson & Tracy Wolfson

In the game dubbed "Saban Bowl I", in which Nick Saban's new Alabama team faced a LSU Tigers team that featured several players Saban himself had recruited during his tenure in Baton Rouge, the Tide found itself in an SEC shootout, but lost 41–34. Alabama struck first with a 36-yard Leigh Tiffin field goal. However, the Tigers then scored 17 unanswered points. After Colt David connected on a 43-yard field goal to tie the game at 3–3, Matt Flynn connected with Early Doucet for a ten-yard touchdown reception and Jacob Hester scored from one-yard out to give LSU a 17–3 lead early in the second quarter. Alabama responded with 17 points in the second quarter, and the Crimson Tide led 20–17 at halftime. The first score came on a 67-yard John Parker Wilson touchdown pass to D. J. Hall, the second on a 21-yard Tiffin field goal and the third on a 29-yard Wilson touchdown pass to Keith Brown.

The third quarter saw no scoring until the last two minutes. With 1:19 left, Keith Brown caught a 14-yard touchdown pass from Wilson to make the score 27–17. The Tigers quickly responded on their next drive when Flynn threw a 61-yard touchdown pass to Demetrius Byrd to bring the Tigers back to within three points of Bama. Then, with 11:21 left in the game, Colt David kicked a 49-yard field goal to tie it up 27–27. The Crimson Tide took a 34–27 lead when Javier Arenas returned a punt for a 61-yard touchdown. With 2:49 left, LSU was able to tie the game again when Flynn threw a 32-yard touchdown pass to Doucet. It appeared the game might go into overtime until Wilson fumbled the ball and LSU recovered on the Alabama four-yard line. Two plays later, Hester ran it in for the game-winning touchdown to make the score 41–34. The Tigers had 475 total yards compared to Alabama's 254. Alabama was able to stay in the game thanks to three interceptions the defense was able to force and 130 yards in penalties that LSU accumulated. John Parker Wilson was 14 for 40 with 234 yards, 3 touchdowns, sacked 7 times, and an interception. The loss brought Alabama's all-time record against the Tigers to 43–23–5.

=== Mississippi State ===
Alabama–Mississippi State football rivalry

Team	1	2	3	4	Total
#22 Alabama	6	3	0	3	12
• Mississippi State	0	10	7	0	17

- Location: Starkville, Mississippi
- Game start: 11:34 a.m.
- Elapsed time: 3:11
- Game attendance: 56,188
- Game weather: 64°, sunny, winds ENE 6 mph
- Referee: Hubert Owens
- TV announcers (LFS): Bill Rosinski (play-by-play), David Archer (analyst) Jenn Hildreth (sideline reporter)

Coming a week after a tough loss to LSU, the Mississippi State Bulldogs defeated Alabama for the second consecutive season, this time by a score of 17–12. Alabama took a 9–0 lead halfway through the second quarter on Leigh Tiffin field goals of 39, 51 and 29 yards. With just over 4:00 remaining in the half, Adam Carlson connected on a 35-yard field goal to cut the score to 9–3. The Bulldogs then took the lead as time expired in the first half after Anthony Johnson intercepted a John Parker Wilson pass and returned it 100-yards for a 10–9 lead.

In the third quarter, Mississippi State extended their lead to 17–9 after scoring the only offensive touchdown of the game. The score came on a three-yard run by Anthony Dixon. Alabama scored their final points in the fourth on a 50-yard Tiffin field goal, his fourth of the afternoon. The loss brought Alabama's all-time record against the Bulldogs to 71–18–3 (70–19–3 without NCAA vacations and forfeits).

=== Louisiana–Monroe ===
Team	1	2	3	4	Total
• Louisiana–Monroe	0	14	7	0	21
Alabama	7	7	0	0	14

- Location: Tuscaloosa, Alabama
- Game start: 1:35 p.m.
- Elapsed time: 2:59
- Game attendance: 92,138
- Game weather: 68°, partly cloudy, winds SSW 9 mph
- Referee: Jeff Roberson

Coming off their second consecutive loss, Alabama suffered their worst loss of the season when the Louisiana–Monroe Warhawks defeated the Crimson Tide 21–14 in Bryant–Denny Stadium. Alabama took an early 7–0 lead after a 17-yard Keith Brown touchdown reception from John Parker Wilson. The Warhawks tied the game at 7–7 on the first play of the second quarter when Calvin Dawson ran it in from one-yard out. Both teams then traded touchdowns to tie the game at 14–14 at the half. Alabama scored on a 12-yard Terry Grant run and Louisiana–Monroe scored on a 13-yard Frank Goodin run. The Warhawks scored what turned out to be the game-winning touchdown in the third quarter when Kinsmon Lancaster tossed an eleven-yard score to Marty Humphrey to win the game for Louisiana–Monroe 21–14.

=== Auburn ===
Iron Bowl

Team	1	2	3	4	Total
Alabama	0	7	0	3	10
• #25 Auburn	10	0	0	7	17

- Location: Auburn, Alabama
- Game start: 7:10 p.m.
- Elapsed time: 3:10
- Game attendance: 87,451
- Game weather: 50°, cloudy, winds NE 8 mph
- Referee: Thomas Ritter
- TV announcers (ESPN): Mike Patrick (play-by-play), Todd Blackledge (analyst), Holly Rowe (sideline reporter)

Coming off their third consecutive loss, Alabama lost in the Iron Bowl for the sixth consecutive time against the arch-rival Auburn Tigers 17–10 on "The Plains". Auburn took a 10–0 lead in the first quarter with Ben Tate scoring on a three-yard touchdown run and Wes Byrum connecting on a 37-yard field goal. Alabama then cut the lead to 10–7 at the half after a two-yard John Parker Wilson touchdown run early in the second quarter. After a scoreless third quarter, Brandon Cox extended the Tigers' lead to 17–7 on his one-yard touchdown run with only 3:58 remaining in the game. Alabama was able to cut the lead to 17–10 after a 49-yard Leigh Tiffin field goal with 2:11 remaining in the game. However, the Crimson Tide were unable to recover the onside kick on the ensuing kickoff and Auburn was able to run out the clock to preserve the 17–10 victory. The loss brought Alabama's all-time record against the Tigers to 38–33–1.

=== Colorado ===
Independence Bowl

Team	1	2	3	4	Total
• Alabama	20	7	0	3	30
Colorado	0	14	3	7	24

- Location: Shreveport, Louisiana
- Game start: 7:06 p.m.
- Elapsed time: 3:20
- Game attendance: 47,043
- Game weather: 49°, clear, winds SW 1 mph
- Referee: Bill Athan
- TV announcers (ESPN): Mark Jones (play-by-play), Bob Davie (analyst), Stacey Dales (sideline reporter)

After a four-game slide to end a once promising season, Alabama defeated the Colorado Buffaloes in the 2007 Independence Bowl 30–24 to finish the season with an overall record of 7–6. Alabama scored on their opening drive on a 41-yard Leigh Tiffin field goal to lead 3–0. Colorado's first offensive play of the game resulted in an interception by Rolando McClain. Once again, Alabama relied on another field goal from Tiffin to push their lead to 6–0. Later in the quarter, John Parker Wilson threw touchdown strikes of 15-yards to Keith Brown and 34-yards to Matt Caddell to extend the Crimson Tide lead to 20–0 after one quarter.

Early in the second quarter, Wilson connected with Nikita Stover on a 31-yard touchdown pass and the Crimson Tide lead 27–0. The Buffaloes controlled the majority of the second quarter after Wilson threw an interception to Ryan Walters with just under six minutes remaining in the half. Colorado cut the Alabama lead to 27–14 at the half on a pair of Cody Hawkins touchdown passes. The first was a four-yard pass to Tyson DeVree and the second a 25-yard pass to Dusty Sprague.

The only score in the third quarter would come from Kevin Eberhart on a 39-yard Colorado field goal. Tiffin kicked a field goal as the Crimson Tide lead 30–17 with just over four minutes remaining in the game. Colorado responded on the following drive with a 14-yard Hawkins touchdown pass to DeVree to cut the Alabama lead to 30–24 with 3:51 remaining in the game. Alabama was able to run the clock down, and after receiving the 49-yard P. J. Fitzgerald punt, only 0:01 remained in the game. On the final play of the game, Colorado attempted several lateral passes but would fall short of midfield. The 30–24 victory sent Alabama to a 7–6 overall record as they avoided a second consecutive losing season.

== Personnel ==
=== Coaching staff ===
On January 3, 2007, Alabama announced that Nick Saban was hired from the Miami Dolphins to serve as the program's 27th head coach. In the weeks that followed, Saban worked to fill his staff. The first hires came on January 9 with Kirby Smart hired from the Dolphins to serve as defensive coordinator; Kevin Steele from Florida State to serve as head defensive coach; and Lance Thompson from UCF to serve as linebackers coach. On January 11, Joe Pendry of the Houston Texans was hired to serve as an assistant head and linebackers coach. On January 12 Saban hired two more assistants. Ron Middleton was hired from the Tampa Bay Buccaneers to serve as both the tight ends and special teams coach and Bo Davis from the Dolphins was hired as defensive line coach. On January 13 Major Applewhite was hired from Rice to serve as both offensive coordinator and quarterbacks coach. On January 16 Burton Burns was hired from Clemson to serve as both associate head and running backs coach. On February 19 Curt Cignetti was hired from NC State to serve as both receivers coach and recruiting coordinator to fill the final position on Saban's inaugural coaching staff.

Name	Position	Year at Alabama	Alma mater (year)
Nick Saban	Head coach	1st	Kent State (1973)
Burton Burns	Associate head coach Running Backs	1st	Nebraska (1976)
Joe Pendry	Assistant head coach- Offense /Offensive Line	1st	West Virginia (1969)
Kirby Smart	Assistant Head Coach- Defense /Secondary	1st	Georgia (1999)
Major Applewhite	Offensive coordinator/quarterbacks	1st	Texas (2002)
Kevin Steele	Defensive coordinator/inside linebackers	1st	Tennessee (1981)
Curt Cignetti	Wide receivers coach/Recruiting Coordinator	1st	West Virginia (1983)
Ron Middleton	Tight Ends/special teams	1st	Auburn (1985)
Bo Davis	Defensive line	1st	LSU (1993)
Lance Thompson	Outside Linebackers	1st	The Citadel (1987)
Scott Cochran	Strength and Conditioning	1st	LSU (2001)
Gabe Giardina	Graduate assistant	4th	Alabama (2004)

=== Roster ===
Quarterbacks: 14 John Parker Wilson – Junior; 16 Thomas Darrah – Freshman; 17 Greg McElroy – (redshirt) Freshman; 18 Nick Fanuzzi – Freshman; 19 Ross Applegate – Freshman; Patrick Bryant – Freshman; Robert Ezell – Freshman; Running backs: 5 Roy Upchurch – (redshirt) Sophomore; 10 Jimmy Johns – Junior; 26 Ali Sharrief – (redshirt) Sophomore; 29 Terry Grant – (redshirt) Freshman; 33 Demetrius Goode – Freshman; 34 Jeramie Griffin – Freshman; 38 Glen Coffee – Sophomore; 40 Baron Huber – (redshirt) Sophomore; Justen santana – Sophomore; Fullbacks: 33 Patrick Hanrahan – Freshman; Drew bullard – Freshman; Brandon powell – Junior; Jacob vane – (redshirt) Freshman; Wide receivers: 4 Marquis Maze – Freshman; 7 Will Oakley – (redshirt) Junior; 9 Nikita Stover – Junior; 11 Matt Caddell – (redshirt) Senior; 15 Darius Hanks – Freshman; 22 D. J. Hall – Senior; 39 Darwin Salaam – Junior; 43 A. J. Walker – Freshman; 46 Kyle Pennington – Freshman; 48 Travis Sikes – Freshman; 80 Mike McCoy – Sophomore; 81 Keith Brown – Senior; 82 Earl Alexander – Freshman; 84 Brandon Gibson – Freshman; Adam presley – Freshman; Chris pugh – Sophomore	Tight ends: 83 Travis McCall – Junior; 85 Preston Dial – Freshman; 87 Chris Underwood – Freshman; 88 Nick Walker – (redshirt) Junior; 89 Charles Hoke – Junior; 96 Daniel Wood – Sophomore; Drew cummings – Freshman; Offensive line: 50 Justin Britt – Senior; 59 Antoine Caldwell – (redshirt) Junior; 60 Scott Deaton – (redshirt) Sophomore; 61 B. J. Stabler – (redshirt) Junior; 62 Alex Stadler – Freshman; 63 Morgan Garner – Senior; 64 Layne Rinks – Junior; 65 Joshua Curry – Senior; 66 Brian Motley – Freshman; 68 Taylor Pharr – Freshman; 69 Patrick Crump – Freshman; 70 Evan Cardwell – (redshirt) Sophomore; 71 Andre Smith – Sophomore; 72 Chris Capps – (redshirt) Senior; 73 William Vlachos – Freshman; 74 David Ross – Freshman; 75 Cody Davis – (redshirt) Junior; 76 Marlon Davis – Junior; 78 Mike Johnson – (redshirt) Sophomore; 79 Drew Davis – (redshirt) Sophomore	Defensive line: 52 Alfred McCullough – Freshman; 54 Jeremy Elder – Freshman; 55 Chavis Williams – Freshman; 56 Matt Collins – (redshirt) Senior; 58 Nick Gentry – Freshman; 77 Byron Walton – (redshirt) Sophomore; 90 Milton Talbert – Freshman; 91 Alex Watkins – Freshman; 92 Wallace Gilberry – (redshirt) Senior; 93 Bobby Greenwood – Junior; 94 Keith Saunders – (redshirt) Senior; 95 Brandon Deaderick – (redshirt) Sophomore; 96 Luther Davis – Freshman; 97 Lorenzo Washington – (redshirt) Sophomore; 98 Brandon Fanney – (redshirt) Sophomore; 99 Josh Chapman – Freshman; Juan garnier – Sophomore; Linebackers: 6 Marcel Stamps – Senior; 21 Prince Hall – (redshirt) Sophomore; 25 Rolando McClain – Freshman; 32 Eryk Anders – (redshirt) Sophomore; 35 Charlie Kirschman – Freshman; 42 Jennings Hester – Freshman; 44 Demarcus Waldrop – (redshirt) Senior; 45 Charlie Higgenbotham – Freshman; 47 Ezekial Knight – Freshman; 51 Michael DeJohn – Freshman; 57 Darren Mustin – (redshirt) Senior; Alex benson – Sophomore; Tucker callahan – Sophomore; Joel nix – Sophomore; Joe robinson – Sophomore	Defensive backs: 2 Simeon Castille – Senior; 3 Kareem Jackson – Freshman; 8 Chris Rogers – (redshirt) Sophomore; 13 Cory Reamer – Sophomore; 16 Lionel Mitchell – Junior; 19 Tarence Farmer – Freshman; 20 Marcus Carter – Senior; 23 Tremayne Coger – Freshman; 24 Marquis Johnson – Sophomore; 27 Justin Woodall – Sophomore; 28 Javier Arenas – Sophomore; 31 Forress Rayford – Senior; 34 Courtney Moore – Sophomore; 36 Eric Gray – (redshirt) Senior; 37 Trent Dean – Junior; 39 Tyrone King – Sophomore; 41 Chris Lett – Freshman; 43 Sam Burnthall – Sophomore; 49 Rashad Johnson – (redshirt) Junior; Rajiv lundy – Sophomore; Lance vickers – Freshman; Safeties: Hampton gray – Sophomore; Punters: 77 Adam Hill – (redshirt) Freshman; 97 P. J. Fitzgerald – (redshirt) Sophomore; Heath thomas – Sophomore; Sam snider – Sophomore; Kickers: 81 Andrew Friedman – Sophomore; 86 Jamie Christensen – (redshirt) Senior; 95 Colin Gallagher – Freshman; 99 Leigh Tiffin – Sophomore; Long snappers: 53 Paul Silvey – Freshman; 67 Brian Selman – Junior; Athletes: Jonathan lowe – Senior

=== Recruiting class ===
Alabama's recruiting class was highlighted by three players from the "ESPN 150": No. 72 Kerry Murphy (DT); No. 80 William Vlachos (OG); and No. 118 Luther Davis (DE). Alabama signed the No. 10 recruiting class according to Rivals and the No. 22 according to Scout.

College recruiting information
Name	Hometown	School	Height	Weight	40^{‡}	Commit date
Josh Chapman; DT	Hoover, AL	Hoover High School	6 ft 1 in (1.85 m)	280 lb (130 kg)	4.90	Feb 6, 2007
Josh Chapman; DT	Recruit ratings: Scout: Rivals: 247Sports: (71)					
Patrick Crump; OL	Hoover, AL	Hoover High School	6 ft 3 in (1.91 m)	285 lb (129 kg)	5.0	Sep 13, 2006
Patrick Crump; OL	Recruit ratings: Scout: Rivals: 247Sports: (74)					
Luther Davis; DT	West Monroe, Louisiana	West Monroe High School	6 ft 4 in (1.93 m)	254 lb (115 kg)	4.8	Jan 26, 2007
Luther Davis; DT	Recruit ratings: Scout: Rivals: 247Sports: (79)					
Jeremy Elder; DE	College Park, Georgia	North Clayton High School	6 ft 3 in (1.91 m)	270 lb (120 kg)	4.9	Feb 4, 2007
Jeremy Elder; DE	Recruit ratings: Scout: Rivals: 247Sports: (73)					
Nick Fanuzzi; QB	San Antonio, Texas	Winston Churchill High School	6 ft 3 in (1.91 m)	200 lb (91 kg)	4.6	Jan 22, 2007
Nick Fanuzzi; QB	Recruit ratings: Scout: Rivals: 247Sports: (78)					
Tarence Farmer; DB	Houston, Texas	St. Pius X High School	6 ft 1 in (1.85 m)	190 lb (86 kg)	4.4	Jan 22, 2007
Tarence Farmer; DB	Recruit ratings: Scout: Rivals: 247Sports: (77)					
Nick Gentry; DT	Prattville, AL	Prattville High School	6 ft 1 in (1.85 m)	265 lb (120 kg)	4.8	Aug 6, 2006
Nick Gentry; DT	Recruit ratings: Scout: Rivals: 247Sports: (78)					
Brandon Gibson; WR	Mobile, AL	UMS-Wright Preparatory School	6 ft 2 in (1.88 m)	190 lb (86 kg)	4.5	Feb 7, 2007
Brandon Gibson; WR	Recruit ratings: Scout: Rivals: 247Sports: (79)					
Demetrius Goode; RB	Chatham, Virginia	Hargrave Military Academy	5 ft 11 in (1.80 m)	200 lb (91 kg)	4.5	Jan 28, 2007
Demetrius Goode; RB	Recruit ratings: Scout: Rivals: 247Sports: (79)					
Jeramie Griffin; RB	Batesville, Mississippi	South Panola High School	6 ft 0 in (1.83 m)	230 lb (100 kg)	4.5	Jan 28, 2007
Jeramie Griffin; RB	Recruit ratings: Scout: Rivals: 247Sports: (77)					
Darius Hanks; WR	Norcross, Georgia	Norcross High School	6 ft 0 in (1.83 m)	168 lb (76 kg)	4.6	Jan 29, 2007
Darius Hanks; WR	Recruit ratings: Scout: Rivals: 247Sports: (71)					
Jennings Hester; LB	Atlanta, Georgia	Marist School	6 ft 3 in (1.91 m)	228 lb (103 kg)	4.7	Jun 13, 2006
Jennings Hester; LB	Recruit ratings: Scout: Rivals: 247Sports: (72)					
Kareem Jackson; DB	Fork Union, Virginia	Fork Union Military Academy	5 ft 10 in (1.78 m)	185 lb (84 kg)	4.5	Jan 22, 2007
Kareem Jackson; DB	Recruit ratings: Scout: Rivals: 247Sports: (40)					
Chris Lett; DB	Pensacola, Florida	Pensacola High School	6 ft 2 in (1.88 m)	195 lb (88 kg)	4.5	May 25, 2006
Chris Lett; DB	Recruit ratings: Scout: Rivals: 247Sports: (77)					
Marquis Maze; WR	Tarrant, AL	Tarrant High School	5 ft 9 in (1.75 m)	160 lb (73 kg)	4.4	Feb 7, 2007
Marquis Maze; WR	Recruit ratings: Scout: Rivals: 247Sports: (79)					
Rolando McClain; LB	Decatur, AL	Decatur High School	6 ft 4 in (1.93 m)	240 lb (110 kg)	4.6	Jun 21, 2006
Rolando McClain; LB	Recruit ratings: Scout: Rivals: 247Sports: (79)					
Alfred McCullough; DT	Athens, AL	Athens High School	6 ft 3 in (1.91 m)	297 lb (135 kg)	4.9	Jul 9, 2006
Alfred McCullough; DT	Recruit ratings: Scout: Rivals: 247Sports: (76)					
Kerry Murphy; DT	Hoover, AL	Hoover High School	6 ft 5 in (1.96 m)	315 lb (143 kg)	5.1	Jan 14, 2007
Kerry Murphy; DT	Recruit ratings: Scout: Rivals: 247Sports: (81)					
Michael Ricks; DB	Booneville, Mississippi	Northeast Mississippi Community College	6 ft 2 in (1.88 m)	195 lb (88 kg)	4.4	Feb 7, 2007
Michael Ricks; DB	Recruit ratings: Scout: Rivals: 247Sports: (NR)					
Jamar Taylor; RB	Lakeland, Florida	Lakeland Senior High School	5 ft 9 in (1.75 m)	204 lb (93 kg)	4.7	Jun 7, 2006
Jamar Taylor; RB	Recruit ratings: Scout: Rivals: 247Sports: (75)					
Chris Underwood; TE	Vestavia Hills, AL	Vestavia Hills High School	6 ft 4 in (1.93 m)	202 lb (92 kg)	–	Jan 28, 2007
Chris Underwood; TE	Recruit ratings: Scout: Rivals: 247Sports: (40)					
William Vlachos; OL	Mountain Brook, AL	Mountain Brook High School	6 ft 2 in (1.88 m)	287 lb (130 kg)	5.1	Sep 13, 2006
William Vlachos; OL	Recruit ratings: Scout: Rivals: 247Sports: (80)					
Alex Watkins; DE	Brownsville, Tennessee	Haywood High School	6 ft 5 in (1.96 m)	225 lb (102 kg)	4.7	Jun 18, 2006
Alex Watkins; DE	Recruit ratings: Scout: Rivals: 247Sports: (77)					
Chavis Williams; DE	Dora, AL	Dora High School	6 ft 5 in (1.96 m)	220 lb (100 kg)	4.6	Feb 2, 2007
Chavis Williams; DE	Recruit ratings: Scout: Rivals: 247Sports: (75)					
Overall recruit ranking: Scout: 22 Rivals: 10 ESPN: 17
‡ Refers to 40-yard dash; Note: In many cases, Scout, Rivals, 247Sports, On3, and ESPN may conflict in their listings of height, weight and 40 time.; In these cases, the average was taken. ESPN grades are on a 100-point scale.; Sources: "Alabama Signee List 2007". Rivals.; "Scout.com Football Recruiting: Alabama". Scout.; "2008 Player Signees- Alabama". ESPN.; "Scout.com Team Recruiting Rankings". Scout.; "2007 Team Ranking". Rivals.com.

=== Statistics ===
On the defensive side of the ball, of the 119 FBS schools Alabama ranked 28th in rushing defense (124.15 yards per game), 27th in scoring defense (22.00 points per game), 31st in total defense (345.46 yards per game) and 48th in passing defense (221.31 yards per game). Individually, Rashad Johnson led the team with 94 total tackles, 57 solo tackles and 37 assisted tackles. Wallace Gilberry was 23rd nationally, third in conference and first on the team with 10 quarterback sacks. Gilberry was also third nationally, first in conference and first on the team with 22 tackles for loss. Rashad Johnson led the team with six of Alabama's nineteen total interceptions of the season.

On offense, of the 119 FBS teams, Alabama ranked 59th in passing offense (224.54 yards per game), 60th in rushing offense (149.23 yards per game), 64th in scoring offense (27.08 points per game) and 75th in total offense (373.77 yards per game). In conference, they ranked sixth in passing offense, seventh in total offense and scoring offense and eighth in rushing offense. Individually, Terry Grant led the team offensively with 891 total yards rushing for an average of 81 rushing yards per game and 8 rushing touchdowns. John Parker Wilson led the team in passing offense and completed 255 of 462 passes for 2,846 passing yards and 18 touchdowns. D. J. Hall led the team with 67 receptions for 1,005 yards and six touchdown receptions.

== After the season ==
In the week following the Independence Bowl victory, several changes were made to the Alabama coaching staff. Alabama lost their tight ends and special teams coach, Ron Middleton, on January 4, 2008, when he was hired as assistant head coach for Duke and their offensive coordinator and quarterbacks coach, Major Applewhite, on January 16, 2008, when he was hired as running backs coach for Texas. During the following weeks, Saban named former Michigan State head coach Bobby Williams as his team's new as tight ends coach and special teams coordinator, and Jim McElwain from Fresno State as the new offensive coordinator and quarterbacks coach. As part of the A-Day celebrations on April 12, 2008, the 2007 team captains Antoine Caldwell, Rashad Johnson and Darren Mustin were honored at the Walk of Fame ceremony at the base of Denny Chimes.

=== Awards ===
Following the SEC Championship Game, the conference named its award winners. Four players were named to the Coaches' All-SEC First Team, including Andre Smith, Wallace Gilberry, Simeon Castille and Rashad Johnson. D. J. Hall and Antoine Caldwell were named to the Coaches' All-SEC Second Team. Terry Grant, Rolando McClain and Kareem Jackson were named to the 2007 Freshman All-SEC Team. McClain was also named to the 2007 Freshman All-America team by the Football Writers Association of America.

=== NCAA sanctions ===
In October 2007, the athletic department discovered a potential NCAA-violation present throughout the athletics program. The violations stemmed from athletes from several sports, including football, receiving improper benefits as a result of a failure in the distribution system of textbooks to student athletes from the university. As a result of this discovery, Antoine Caldwell, Marlon Davis, Glen Coffee, Marquis Johnson and Chris Rogers were suspended from the team prior to the Tennessee game on October 20. After a prolonged investigation, in June 2009 the NCAA ruled all athletes that received improper benefits related to the textbook distribution system were deemed ineligible. As such, as part of the penalties imposed on the football program, all victories which those included in the inquiry participated, were officially vacated from the all-time record. The penalty to vacate victories does not result in a loss (or forfeiture) of the affected contests or award a victory to the opponent. As such, all five victories from the 2007 season prior to the suspension of the ineligible players on October 20 (Western Carolina, Vanderbilt, Arkansas, Houston and Ole Miss) were vacated making the official record for the season two wins and six losses (2–6).

=== NFL draft ===
After not having any players selected in the 2008 NFL draft, in the 2009 NFL draft, Alabama had four players that competed as part of the 2007 team selected. The first round selection was Andre Smith (6th Cincinnati Bengals); and the third round picks were Coffee (74th San Francisco 49ers), Caldwell (77th Houston Texans) and Rashad Johnson (95th Arizona Cardinals). John Parker Wilson with the Atlanta Falcons, Bobby Greenwood with the Kansas City Chiefs, Marlon Davis with the Cleveland Browns, Nick Walker with the Minnesota Vikings and Travis McCall with the Buffalo Bills each signed as undrafted free agents.

In the 2010 NFL draft, Alabama had six players selected that competed as part of the 2007 team. The first round selections were McClain (8th Oakland Raiders) and Jackson (20th Houston Texans); the second round pick was Arenas (50th Kansas City Chiefs); the third round pick was Mike Johnson (98th Atlanta Falcons); and the seventh round picks were Marquis Johnson (211th St. Louis Rams) and Deaderick (247th New England Patriots). Both Peek and Washington, with the Atlanta Falcons and Dallas Cowboys respectively, signed as undrafted free agents.

Following the 2010 season, Alabama had two players selected that competed as part of the 2007 team in the 2011 NFL draft. James Carpenter was selected in the first round (25th Seattle Seahawks) and Greg McElroy was selected in the seventh round (208th New York Jets).
