= 2007 Independence Bowl =

2007 PetroSun Independence Bowl
Alabama Crimson Tide	Colorado Buffaloes
(6–6 (Note: In March 2009, the NCAA ruled that Alabama must vacate five of its victories from the 2007 season due to sanctions stemming from textbook-related infractions discovered during the 2007 season. After an unsuccessful appeal to the NCAA Division I Infractions Appeals Committee, their official record entering the 2007 Independence Bowl was 2–6.))	(6–6)
SEC	Big 12
30	24
Head coach: Nick Saban	Head coach: Dan Hawkins
	1	2	3	4	Total
Alabama	20	7	0	3	30
Colorado	0	14	3	7	24
- Date: December 30, 2007
- Season: 2007
- Stadium: Independence Stadium
- Location: Shreveport, Louisiana
- MVP: Alabama QB John Parker Wilson; Alabama DE Wallace Gilberry
- Favorite: Alabama by 3½
- Referee: Bill Athan (WAC)
- Attendance: 47,043
- Payout: US$2,200,000

United States TV coverage
- Network: ESPN
- Announcers: Mark Jones, Bob Davie, and Stacey Dales

The 2007 PetroSun Independence Bowl, part of the 2007–08 NCAA football bowl season, took place on December 30, 2007, at Independence Stadium in Shreveport, Louisiana. The competing teams were the Alabama Crimson Tide, representing the Southeastern Conference, and the Colorado Buffaloes, from the Big 12 Conference. Alabama won the game, 30–24.

This was the only 2007–08 bowl game in which both teams finished 6–6 on the regular season. At their current programs, it was also the first bowl game for both respective head coaches (Nick Saban and Dan Hawkins).

== Game summary ==
Alabama played Colorado in the Independence Bowl on December 30, 2007. Alabama scored on their opening drive on a 41-yard Leigh Tiffin field goal to lead 3–0. Colorado's first offensive play of the game resulted in an interception by Rolando McClain. Once again, Alabama relied on another field goal from Tiffin to push their lead to 6–0. Later in the quarter, John Parker Wilson threw touchdown strikes of 15-yards to Keith Brown and 34-yards to Matt Caddell to extend the Crimson Tide lead to 20–0 after one quarter.

Early in the second quarter, Wilson connected with Nikita Stover on a 31-yard touchdown pass and the Crimson Tide lead 27–0. The Buffaloes controlled the majority of the second quarter after Wilson threw an interception to Ryan Walters with just under six minutes remaining in the half. Colorado cut the Alabama lead to 27–14 at the half on a pair of Cody Hawkins touchdown passes. The first was a four-yard pass to Tyson DeVree and the second a 25-yard pass to Dusty Sprague.

The only score in the third quarter would come from Kevin Eberhart on a 39-yard Colorado field goal. Tiffin kicked a field goal as the Crimson Tide lead 30–17 with just over four minutes remaining in the game. Colorado responded on the following drive with a 14-yard Hawkins touchdown pass to DeVree to cut the Alabama lead to 30–24 with 3:51 remaining in the game. Alabama was able to run the clock down, and after receiving the 49-yard P.J. Fitzgerald punt, only 0:01 remained in the game. On the final play of the game, Colorado attempted several lateral passes but would fall short of midfield. The 30–24 victory sent Alabama to a 7–6 overall record as they avoided a second consecutive losing season.

Scoring summary

Quarter	Time	Drive			Team	Scoring information	Score	
Quarter	Time	Plays	Yards	TOP	Team	Scoring information	Colorado	Alabama
1	11:30	8	44	3:30	Alabama	41-yard field goal by Leigh Tiffin	0	3
1	9:13	4	8	2:01	Alabama	24-yard field goal by Leigh Tiffin	0	6
1	5:09	6	55	2:08	Alabama	Keith Brown 15-yard touchdown reception from John Parker Wilson, Leigh Tiffin kick good	0	13
1	1:31	4	63	2:08	Alabama	Matt Caddell 34-yard touchdown reception from John Parker Wilson, Leigh Tiffin kick good	0	20
2	12:20	6	67	1:47	Alabama	Nikita Stover 31-yard touchdown reception from John Parker Wilson, Leigh Tiffin kick good	0	27
2	2:05	8	43	3:43	Colorado	Tyson DeVree 4-yard touchdown reception from Cody Hawkins, Kevin Eberhart kick good	7	27
2	0:04	6	5	1:07	Colorado	Dusty Sprague 25-yard touchdown reception from Cody Hawkins, Kevin Eberhart kick good	14	27
3	3:00	14	76	5:19	Colorado	39-yard field goal by Kevin Eberhart	17	27
4	4:36	7	14	3:16	Alabama	26-yard field goal by Leigh Tiffin	17	30
4	3:51	5	69	0:45	Colorado	Tyson DeVree 14-yard touchdown reception from Cody Hawkins, Kevin Eberhart kick good	24	30
"TOP" = time of possession. For other American football terms, see Glossary of American football.							24	30
