= Glen Coffee =

American football player (born 1987)

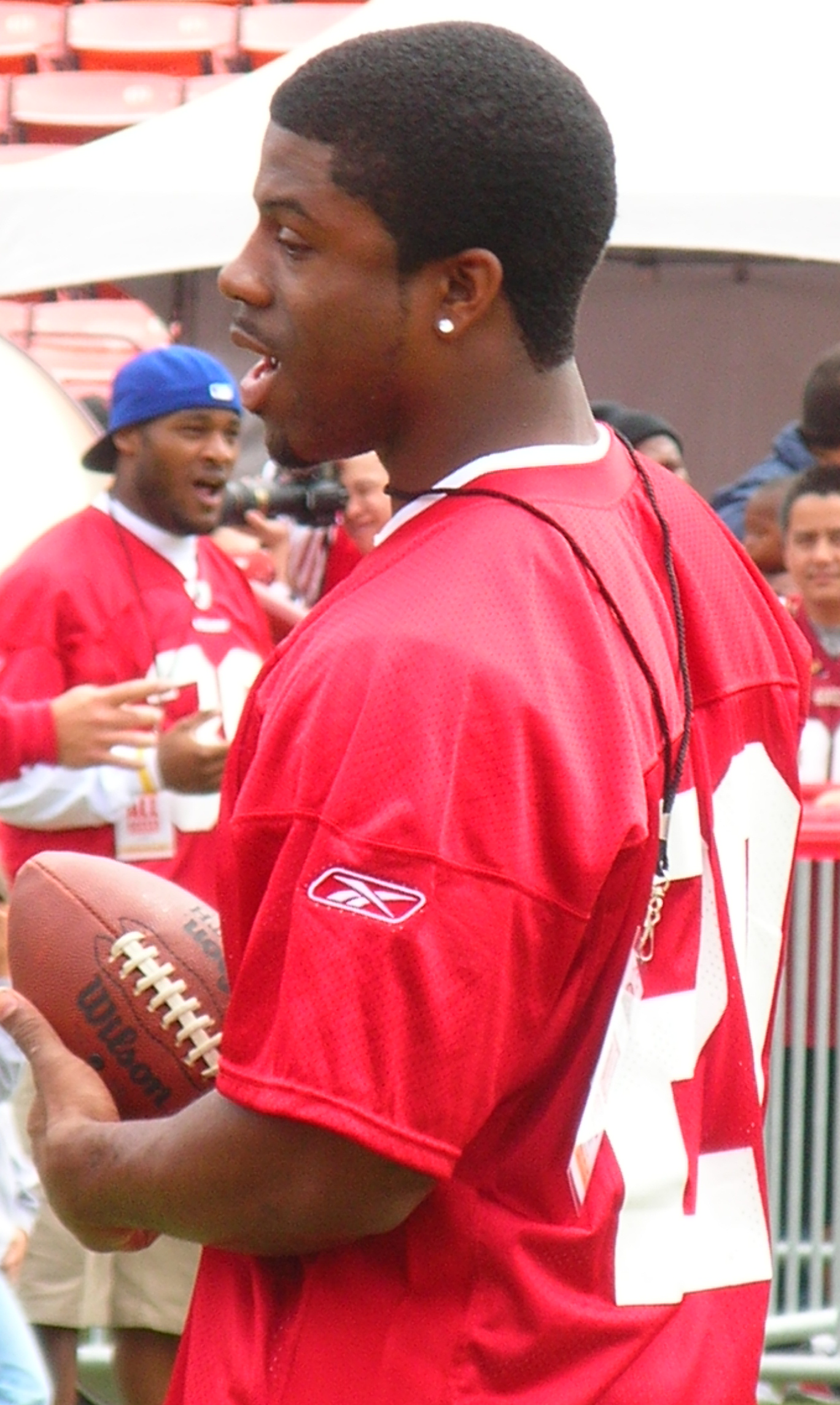
- Coffee at San Francisco 49ers Family Day in 2009

No. 29
- Position: Running back

Personal information
- Born: May 1, 1987 (age 39); Eglin Air Force Base, Florida, U.S.
- Listed height: 6 ft 0 in (1.83 m)
- Listed weight: 209 lb (95 kg)

Career information
- High school: Fort Walton Beach
- College: Alabama (2005–2008)
- NFL draft: 2009: 3rd round, 74th overall pick

Career history
- San Francisco 49ers (2009)

Awards and highlights
- First-team All-SEC (2008)

Career NFL statistics
- Rushing attempts: 83
- Rushing yards: 226
- Rushing touchdowns: 1
- Receptions: 11
- Receiving yards: 76
- Stats at Pro Football Reference

Glen Coffee
- Military career
- Allegiance: United States of America
- Branch: United States Army
- Service years: 2013–2017
- Rank: Specialist

Glenwood Razeem Coffee Jr. (born May 1, 1987) is an American former professional football player who was a running back in the National Football League (NFL). He was selected by the San Francisco 49ers in the third round of the 2009 NFL draft and played one season before retiring from football in 2010 and serving in the U.S. Army from 2013 to 2017. Coffee came out of retirement and was reinstated by the NFL on April 21, 2017. He played college football at the University of Alabama.

== College career ==
=== 2005 season ===
In Coffee's freshman season at Alabama, he appeared in all twelve games. On September 17, he rushed for a season-high 75 yards on 15 attempts in a 37–14 win over South Carolina. He did not see significant action throughout the remainder of the season, as he was a backup to starter Kenneth Darby while sharing time with Jimmy Johns. In Alabama's homecoming game versus Utah State, he scored his first collegiate touchdown on a 9–yard reception from quarterback John Parker Wilson.

In his freshman season, Coffee rushed for 179 yards on 48 attempts. He also caught eight passes for 91 yards, including one touchdown.

=== 2007 season ===
After redshirting his sophomore season on campus, Coffee returned in the 2007 season under new head coach Nick Saban. In that season, he split time as the starting running back with freshman Terry Grant. In the season opener versus Western Carolina, Coffee rushed nine times for 76 yards and one touchdown in a 52–6 victory. In the season's homecoming game, he had his first 100-yard rushing game in a 30–24 win over Houston. In total, he rushed for 121 yards on 30 attempts and one touchdown, as well as catching one pass for six yards. However, he did not accumulate any statistics in four of Alabama's final five games. Alabama earned an appearance in the 2007 Independence Bowl versus Colorado. Coffee carried the ball 19 times for 72 yards in a 30–24 win.

Coffee finished his redshirt sophomore season with 545 yards on 129 carries, scoring four touchdowns. He also caught 18 passes for 142 yards.

=== 2008 season ===
In the 2008 season, Coffee was the starter in all 14 games, though he shared time with two other running backs, Roy Upchurch and Mark Ingram II. Coffee's first 100-yard rushing performance came in the fourth game of the season in a 49–14 rout of Arkansas. He carried the ball ten times for 162 yards and two touchdowns, including his career-long run of 87 yards. In the following game, Coffee again scored twice in a 41–30 upset over #3 Georgia, finishing the game with 23 carries for 86 yards. Coffee's career best game came in the following week in a 17–14 win over Kentucky, as he ran for 218 yards on 25 attempts, including a 78-yard touchdown run in the first quarter. His 218 yards was the most by an Alabama running back since Shaun Alexander in 1996. Alabama clinched a berth in the 2008 SEC Championship Game with a 27–21 overtime victory over LSU, in which Coffee rushed for 126 yards and one touchdown. In the annual Iron Bowl, he ran for his fourth 100+ yard game in a 36–0 rout of rival Auburn with 144 yards and one touchdown. After rushing for 112 yards in the SEC Championship game loss to Florida, Coffee was held to his season low in the 2009 Sugar Bowl against Utah. The Utes defense held Coffee to 36 yards on 13 attempts in a 31–17 Utah victory.

In his best statistical season at Alabama, Coffee ran for 1,383 yards and ten touchdowns, while averaging 5.9 yards per carry. With his season's performance, Coffee was named to the Associated Press All-SEC first-team. On January 9, 2009, Coffee announced he would forgo his Senior year and declare for the 2009 NFL draft. He was represented by sports agent Todd Crannell of Q2 Sports & Entertainment.

=== College statistics ===
Team	Season	Rushing					Receiving				
Team	Season	Att	Yards	Avg	Long	TD	Rec	Yards	Avg	Long	TD
Alabama	2005	48	179	3.7	37	0	8	91	11.4	40	1
Alabama	2006	Redshirt season									
Alabama	2007	129	545	4.2	20	4	18	142	7.9	32	0
Alabama	2008	233	1,383	5.9	87	10	16	118	7.4	15	1
Total		410	2,107	5.1	87	14	42	351	8.4	40	2

== Professional career ==
Pre-draft measurables
Height	Weight	Arm length	Hand span	40-yard dash	10-yard split	20-yard split	20-yard shuttle	Three-cone drill	Vertical jump	Broad jump	Bench press
6 ft 0 1/8 in (1.83 m)	209 lb (95 kg)	31 3/4 in (0.81 m)	9 1/2 in (0.24 m)	4.58 s	1.62 s	2.68 s	4.51 s	7.35 s	36.0 in (0.91 m)	10 ft 1 in (3.07 m)	24 reps
All values from NFL Combine

=== San Francisco 49ers ===
Coffee was selected in the third round of the 2009 NFL draft with the 74th overall pick by the San Francisco 49ers. He was used primarily as a backup to Pro Bowl running back Frank Gore. Coffee finished with 83 carries for 226 rushing yards and one rushing touchdown in 14 games, of which he started two.

=== Retirement ===
After attending OTAs minicamp, and two weeks of training camp, Coffee abruptly announced on August 13 that he would retire just before the start of the 2010 NFL preseason. Head coach Mike Singletary stated that sixth round draft pick Anthony Dixon and veteran Michael Robinson would compete for the second running back spot and that Coffee's departure would not be a distraction to the team. However, on August 16, the 49ers signed free agent veteran Brian Westbrook as the backup running back to a one-year deal. The 49ers considered trying to recoup $621,000 of Coffee's $828,000 signing bonus.

Coffee planned to return to the University of Alabama to finish his degree in consumer affairs, with an eye towards graduate school. Coffee confirmed that the reason he retired was that his heart was never in football and that he believed God wanted him to take another path.

=== Comeback ===
On April 21, 2017, Coffee was officially reinstated by the NFL and was subsequently released by the San Francisco 49ers who still owned his player rights. Coffee announced his intentions to play in The Spring League Showcase on July 15, 2017.

Coffee returned to the University of Alabama to finish his college degree and worked as an assistant coach with the running backs for Nick Saban's coaching staff.

== Military service ==
Coffee subsequently enlisted in the U.S. Army in February 2013 to become a paratrooper.

In June 2013, Coffee graduated from United States Army Airborne School. He trained as a paratrooper, and was assigned to the 6th Ranger Training Battalion. He reached the rank of Specialist (E-4) and served as an airborne infantryman.

== Personal life ==
Coffee's brother, Matt, played fullback for the University of South Carolina. Coffee co-authored a book with his father Glen Coffee Sr. There’s More to Life than the Pursuit of Money.
