= 2009 Sugar Bowl =

2009 Allstate Sugar Bowl
- BCS Bowl Game; 75th Sugar Bowl
- Sugar Bowl 75th Anniversary logo
Utah Utes	Alabama Crimson Tide
(12–0)	(12–1)
MWC	SEC
31	17
Head coach: Kyle Whittingham	Head coach: Nick Saban
AP / Coaches / BCS; 7 / 7 / 6	AP / Coaches / BCS; 4 / T-4 / 4
	1	2	3	4	Total
Utah	21	0	7	3	31
Alabama	0	10	7	0	17
- Date: January 2, 2009
- Season: 2008
- Stadium: Louisiana Superdome
- Location: New Orleans, Louisiana
- MVP: QB Brian Johnson, Utah
- Favorite: Alabama by 10
- National anthem: Shades of Praise Choir New Orleans, LA
- Referee: Scott Novak (Big XII)
- Halftime show: The Pride of Utah; Million Dollar Band
- Attendance: 71,872
- Payout: US$17,500,000 per team

United States TV coverage
- Network: FOX
- Announcers: Kenny Albert play-by-play Daryl Johnston color Charissa Thompson sideline Chris Myers sideline
- Nielsen ratings: 7.8 (13.369 million, up 11%)

The 2009 Allstate Sugar Bowl was the 75th annual edition of the annual college football bowl game that is part of the 2008–09 bowl season of the Bowl Championship Series (BCS) 2008 NCAA Division I FBS football season. The game was played on Friday, January 2, 2009, at the Louisiana Superdome in New Orleans, Louisiana between the Utah Utes, champions of the Mountain West Conference, and the Alabama Crimson Tide, representing the Southeastern Conference.

The Sugar Bowl usually takes the champion of the SEC and pits them against an At-Large BCS team. However, with the 2008 SEC Champion, Florida Gators being selected to play for the national championship game, the Sugar Bowl selected two At-Large BCS teams. The bowl kept their traditional ties with the Southeastern Conference for the second consecutive year though, in selecting the Alabama Crimson Tide with an at-large selection.

In the 2009 edition of this bowl game, the No. 6 Utes pulled off an upset of the heavily favored No. 4 Crimson Tide by a score of 31–17. Utah quarterback Brian Johnson was named Most Outstanding Player of the game. With this win, Utah completed the 2008 season as the only undefeated, 13–0 Division I FBS team in the nation, along with becoming the first team from a BCS non-AQ conference to win two BCS bowls. It was also Utah's first win over a Southeastern Conference school. Andre Smith (Alabama starting left tackle and 2008 Outland Trophy winner) was suspended for the game because he declined to cooperate with an investigation by the school's compliance staff on the issue with his uncle's illegal contact with a sports agent. A few days later, he declared himself for the NFL Draft and was the 6th overall pick.

== Scoring summary ==
Quarter	Time	Drive		Team	Scoring Information	Score	
Quarter	Time	Length	Time	Team	Scoring Information	Utah	Alabama
1	11:02	5 plays, 68 yards	1:19	Utah	Brent Casteel 7–yard reception from Brian Johnson, Louie Sakoda kick good	7	0
1	8:37	5 plays, 32 yards	1:37	Utah	Matt Asiata 2–yard rush, Louie Sakoda kick good	14	0
1	4:01	7 plays, 65 yards	1:57	Utah	Bradon Godfrey 18–yard reception from Brian Johnson, Louie Sakoda kick good	21	0
2	14:55	7 plays, 23 yards	4:06	Alabama	Leigh Tiffin 52–yard field goal	21	3
2	5:28	0 plays, 0 yards	0:00	Alabama	Javier Arenas 73–yard punt return, Leigh Tiffin kick good	21	10
3	11:41	7 plays, 30 yards	3:05	Alabama	Glen Coffee 4–yard reception from John Parker Wilson, Leigh Tiffin kick good	21	17
3	10:04	7 plays, 71 yards	1:37	Utah	David Reed 28–yard reception from Brian Johnson, Louie Sakoda kick good	28	17
4	2:49	7 plays, 31 yards	2:24	Utah	Louie Sakoda 28–yard field goal	31	17
Final Score						31	17
