= D. J. Hall =

American gridiron football player (born 1986)

No. 6
- Position: Wide receiver

Personal information
- Born: July 18, 1986 (age 40); Fort Walton Beach, Florida, U.S.
- Listed height: 6 ft 3 in (1.91 m)
- Listed weight: 190 lb (86 kg)

Career information
- College: Alabama
- NFL draft: 2008: undrafted

Career history
- New York Giants (2008)*; Oakland Raiders (2008)*; Winnipeg Blue Bombers (2010)*; Spokane Shock (2010–2011)*; Pittsburgh Power (2011); Jacksonville Sharks (2013)
- * Offseason or practice squad member only

Awards and highlights
- 3× Second-team All-SEC (2005, 2006, 2007)

Career AFL statistics as of 2012
- Receptions: 20
- Receiving yards: 176
- Receiving touchdowns: 5
- Stats at ArenaFan.com

Martinez D. Hall (born July 18, 1986) is an American former football wide receiver. He was signed by the New York Giants as an undrafted free agent in 2008. He played college football at Alabama.

== Early life ==
Hall attended Choctawhatchee High School in Fort Walton Beach, Florida. He was a three-time All-state selection in basketball. During his junior year, Hall caught 44 balls for 974 yards and 14 TDs. He recorded 26 catches for 733 yards and 12 touchdowns as a senior. Hall was ranked #44 on the Orlando Sentinel Florida Top 100 List and #35 on the 2004 Rivals.com receiver rankings.

== College career ==
Hall started his career as a true freshman during the 2004 season for the University of Alabama Crimson Tide, under head coach Mike Shula. In his freshman season, he caught 17 passes for 186 yards, including one touchdown. In the 2004 Music City Bowl, he led the team with five receptions for 51 yards.

In his sophomore season, Hall was the leading receiver for Alabama with 48 catches for 676 yards and five touchdowns. His 157 yards receiving against Utah State was a career-high. Hall also achieved the distinction of being the only Alabama player to have consecutive games with ten or more catches, coming against Tennessee and Utah State.

During the 2006 season, Hall once again led the team with 62 receptions for 1,056 yards and five touchdowns, setting a new record for single season yardage. He also became the third all-time receiver with 127 receptions, and second with 1,918 yards in his career.

Hall broke several school records during the 2007 season including most career catches, touchdowns, and receiving yards. In a game versus rival Tennessee, Hall had 13 receptions (a school record since broken by DeVonta Smith) for 185 yards, including two touchdowns. He finished the regular season with 63 receptions, including 6 touchdowns, for 947 yards which once again led the team. In his final game for Alabama, Hall recorded a mere 4 catches for 58 yards, in the process breaking the school record for receptions in a season. Overall, Hall finished the year with 67 receptions for 1,005 yards.

Hall became the first Alabama player to record five straight 100-yard receiving games. His 2,923 career receiving yards easily surpassed the previous school record of 2,070 yards by Ozzie Newsome

== Professional career ==
=== New York Giants ===
Though he entered the 2008 NFL draft, Hall went undrafted. On April 28, 2008, Hall signed a contract with the New York Giants. He became the second Alabama player to sign with the Giants, after teammate Wallace Gilberry signed a day before. He was later waived on August 25, 2008.

=== Oakland Raiders ===
Hall was signed to the practice squad of the Oakland Raiders on December 17, 2008.

=== Winnipeg Blue Bombers ===
Hall was signed by the Winnipeg Blue Bombers on February 23, 2010. After suffering a hamstring injury in training camp, he was released on June 4, 2010.

=== Spokane Shock ===
Hall was signed by the Shock on November 1, 2010. He was released on January 5, 2011.

=== Pittsburgh Power ===
Hall was signed by the Power on February 14, 2011. He was placed on the Physically Unable to Perform list on February 23, 2011. He was placed on Injured Reserve on March 26. He was activated on May 4, 2011. Hall was placed back on Injured Reserve on June 2, 2011. He was again activated on June 28, 2011. Hall was placed back on Injured Reserve on July 12, 2011. Hall played 4 games for the Power during the 2011 season, finishing with 20 receptions for 176 yards and 5 touchdowns.

== See also ==
- Alabama Crimson Tide football yearly statistical leaders
