= Burton Burns =

American football coach (born 1952)

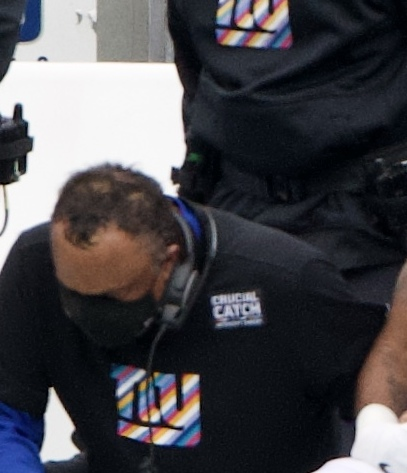
- Coach Burns in 2020

Personal information
- Born: October 27, 1952 (age 74); New Orleans, Louisiana, U.S.

Career information
- High school: St. Augustine (New Orleans)
- College: Nebraska

Career history
- Southern (1981–1985) Assistant coach; Tulane (1994–1998) Assistant coach; Clemson (1999–2006) Running backs coach; Alabama (2007–2017) Running backs coach; New York Giants (2020–2021) Running backs coach

Awards and highlights
- 5× BCS national champion (2009, 2011, 2012, 2015, 2017) (Note: As associate head coach); National champion (1971)

Burton “Burkie” Burns (born October 27, 1952) most recently was the running backs coach of the New York Giants of the National Football League (NFL). Burns previously was a coach at Alabama from 2007 until 2017, where he had been the associate head coach and running backs coach for the team. He was the running backs coach at Clemson from 1999-2006, and prior to that he was an assistant coach at Tulane from 1994–1998.

== Playing career ==
Burns played fullback at Nebraska (1972–1976) under head coach Tom Osborne. He was a player on three Cornhusker teams that won at least nine games in each season. Burns participated in bowl games such as the Orange Bowl, Cotton Bowl, and the Sugar Bowl. He earned a bachelor's degree in education from Nebraska in 1976.

== Family ==
Burns is married to the former Connie Winder. Together, the couple has four children: three daughters, Amber, Christy, and Erin, and a son, Damon. In addition, they have two grandchildren, one granddaughter, and one grandson.
