= Todd Crannell =

American sports agent (born 1976)

- Education: Florida State University; Oxford University
- Occupation: agent

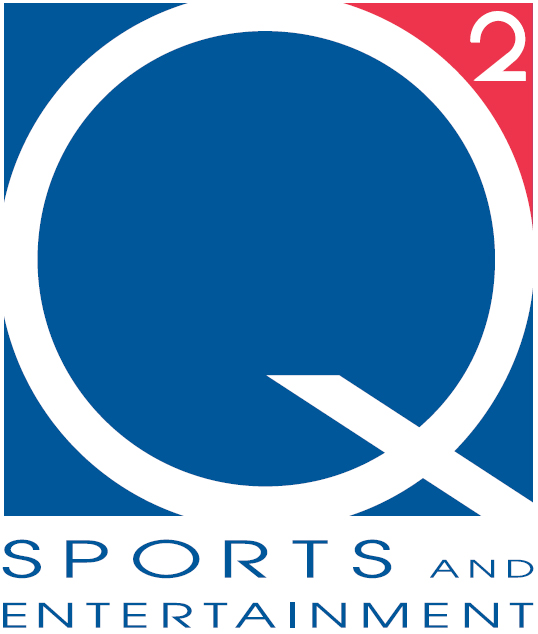
Q2 Sports and Entertainment's Logo.

Todd Crannell is an NFL and Entertainment agent. His agency, Q2 Sports and Entertainment, represents athletes, models, celebrities and TV personalities. Some of the company's best known clients include Glen Coffee (Retired San Francisco 49ers Running Back), Bam Margera (MTV personality), Vida Guerra (model), Pauly Shore (comedian), and Kerron Clement (Olympic track & field sprinter).

== Q2 Sports and Entertainment ==
Todd Crannell is the President and Founder of Q2 Sports & Entertainment, a sports and entertainment talent agency. He also managed the daily operations of the NFL Division and served as the day-to-day agent for Q2's football clients. He was formerly certified by the National Football League Players Association to represent players in contract negotiations with NFL teams, though that is no longer the case.

== Work experience ==
Before he started Q2, Crannell served as Director of the Sports Division and Sales Staff at Irene Marie Agency, a Florida-based talent-agency. He also worked for the United States Department of Labor as an economist. He conducted research and co-published the economic report “Employment Situation,” which provided analysis used by the Congress and the White House.

== Education ==
Crannell completed his graduate school studies in England at the Oxford University. While at Oxford, Crannell completed his MBA degree. He was educated on business skills.

Crannell completed his undergraduate studies at Florida State University. Before graduating, Crannell was named Humanitarian of the Year for the Social Science College for his service to the community.
