= Denny Chimes =

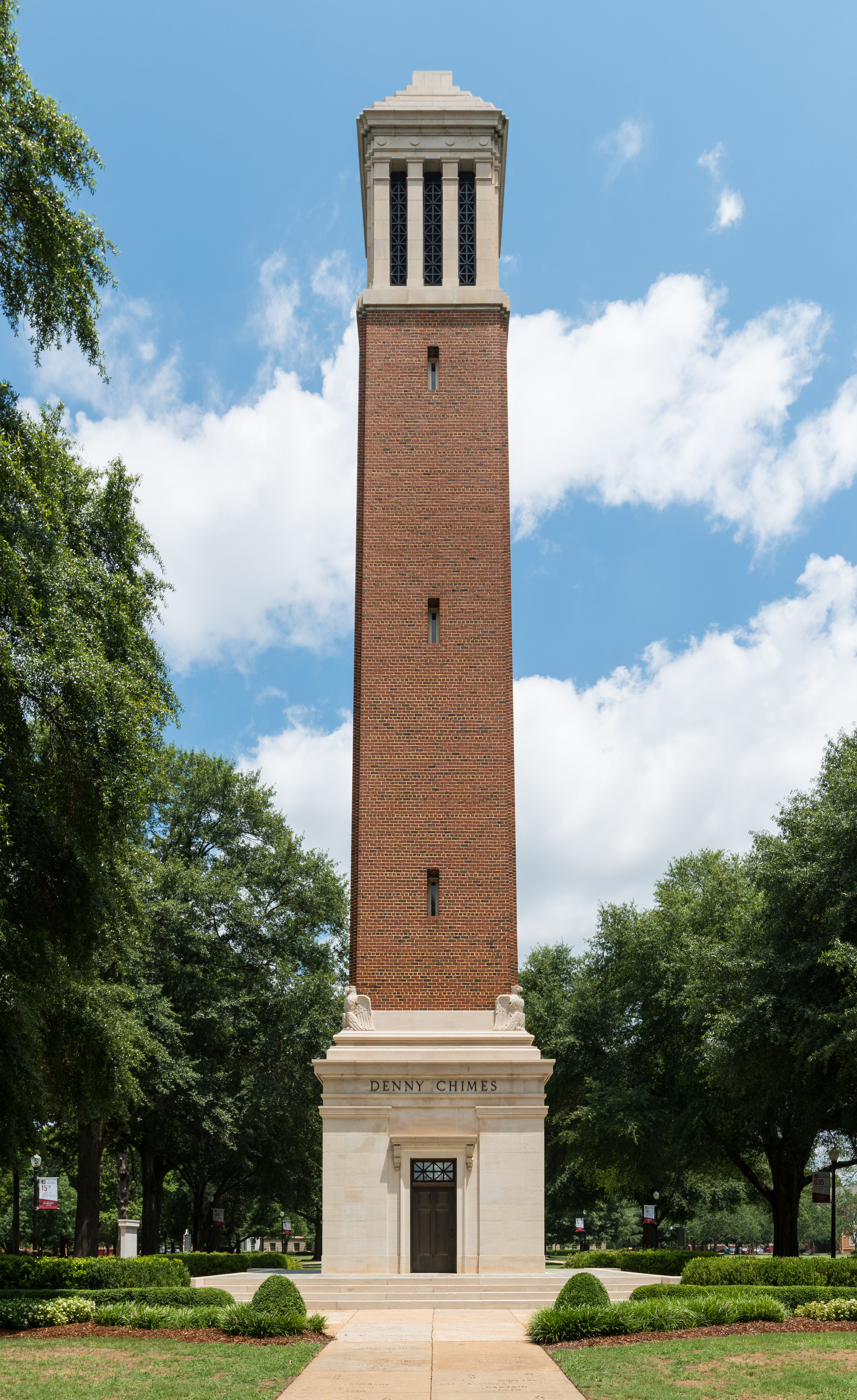
- Denny Chimes on The Quad, following cleaning and restoration

General information
- Type: Campanile
- Architectural style: Art Deco
- Location: Tuscaloosa, Alabama, United States
- Coordinates: 33.20972°N 87.54667°W
- Completed: 1929
- Owner: University of Alabama

Height
- Height: 115 feet (35 m)

Denny Chimes is a 115-foot (35 m) tall campanile tower on the south side of The Quad at the University of Alabama, in Tuscaloosa, Alabama. The tower was named in honor of George H. Denny, who served as university president from 1912 to 1936 and again as interim president from 1941 through 1942. It is equipped with a 25-bell carillon. The tower is one of the most visible landmarks on campus.

== History ==
The idea of erecting a bell tower on the University of Alabama campus was initially suggested in 1919. It was envisioned as a war memorial for those who fought in World War I. Due to a lack of funding for its construction, the project never materialized.

In the late 1920s, university students were finally successful in collecting the necessary funding to construct a tower, although not as a war memorial. It was done in an effort to dedicate the structure to university president George Denny, after learning of a rumor that he was looking to leave the university and return to his native Virginia.

The tower was built by Skinner, Maxwell and Company at a final cost of $40,000. It was dedicated on May 27, 1929, with Governor Bibb Graves in attendance.

== Design ==
The tower is Art Deco in design. The square white limestone base features pilasters at each corner, with a recessed bay in between. The base is crowned by a molded cornice, which in turn is topped by an eagle, with partially outstretched wings, perched at each of the four corners, where the limestone base transitions to the brick shaft. The base supports a red brick shaft that gradually tapers to a limestone crown featuring a belfry with square pillars separated by partially open neoclassical grills, all topped off by a stepped pyramidal roof of limestone. The limestone was quarried in Alabama, while the bricks are from Virginia, in honor of Denny's home state.

== Carillon ==
The carillon features 25 cast bronze bells, with the largest having a circumference of about 11 feet (3 m) and a height of 3 feet (1 m). The Westminster chimes ring every 15 minutes, chiming on the hour in addition to chiming other songs or the alma mater as part of university celebrations or holidays. Inside the base is an automatic player that plays roll music in addition to a keyboard console that is used on special occasions. By 1945, the bell carillon was converted into an electronic system and modernized in 1966. For many years, the Alabama organ professor Warren Hutton served as the carillonneur for memorial services and special events, and today the manual organ is played by both university faculty and students.

== Walk of Fame ==
Surrounding the tower is the Walk of Fame, where captains of the football team have placed their hand and footprints in cement slabs at its base since 1948. The ceremony occurs annually as part of the A-Day festivities, when previous season captains are honored.

The names inscribed on the Walk of Fame include:

- 1947: Harry Gilmer, John Wozniak
- 1948: Billy Cadenhead, Ray Richeson
- 1949: Billy Cadenhead, Ed Holdnak, Doug Lockridge
- 1950: Ed Salem, Mike Mizerany
- 1951: Jack Brown, Harold Lutz
- 1952: Bobby Marlow, Bobby Wilson
- 1953: Ralph Carrigan, Bud Willis
- 1954: Thomsa Tharp, Sid Youngleman
- 1955: Nick Germanos
- 1956: Jim Cunningham, Max Kelly, Wes Thomas
- 1957: Jim Loftin, Clay Walls
- 1958: Bobby Jackson, Dave Sington, Bobby Smith
- 1959: Jim Belvins, Don Cochran, Marlin Dyess
- 1960: Bobby Boylston, Leon Fuller
- 1961: Billy Neighbors, Pat Trammell
- 1962: Lee Roy Jordan, Jimmy Sharpe
- 1963: Not awarded
- 1964: Steve Allen, Benny Nelson
- 1965: Joe Namath, Ray Ogden
- 1966: Richard Cole, Ray Perkins, Steve Sloan
- 1967: Bobby Johns, Kenny Stabler
- 1968: Mike Hall, Donnie Sutton
- 1969: Danny Ford, Alvin Samples
- 1970: Dave Brungard, Danny Gilbert
- 1971: Johnny Musso, Robin Parkhouse
- 1972: Terry Davis, John Mitchell
- 1973: Wilbur Jackson, Chuck Strickland
- 1974: Ricky Davis, Sylvester Croom
- 1975: Lee Roy Cook, Richard Todd
- 1976: Thad Flanagan, Charles Hannah
- 1977: Ozzie Newsome, Mike Tucker
- 1978: Marty Lyons, Tony Nathan
- 1979: Don McNeal, Steve Whitman
- 1980: Alan Gray, Major Ogilvie
- 1981: Warren Lyles, Randy Scott
- 1982: Randy Edwards, Steve Mott
- 1983: Walter Lewis, Eddie Lowe
- 1984: Paul Ott Carruth, Emanuel King
- 1985: Thornton Chandler, Jon Hand
- 1986: Cornelius Bennett, Mike Shula
- 1987: Kerry Goode, Randy Rockwell
- 1988: Derrick Thomas, David Smith
- 1989: Marco Battle, Willie Wyatt
- 1990: Philip Doyle, Gary Hollingsworth, Efrum Thomas
- 1991: Siran Stacy, Robert Stewart, John Sullins, Kevin Turner
- 1992: Derrick Oden, George Teague, George Wilson, Prince Wimbley
- 1993: Chris Anderson, Lemanski Hall, Antonio Langham, Tobie Shiels
- 1994: Jay Barker, Tommy Johnson, Tarrant Lynch, Sam Shade
- 1995: Shannon Brown, Brian Burgdorf, Tony Johnson, John Walters
- 1996: John Causey, Fernando Davis
- 1997: Curtis Alexander, Paul Pickett, Rod Rutledge, Deshea Townsend
- 1998: Calvin Hall, John David Phillips, Daniel Pope, Kelvin Sigler, Travis Smith
- 1999: Shaun Alexander, Cornelius Griffin, Miguel Merritt, Ryan Pflugner, Chris Samuels
- 2000: Paul Hogan, Bradley Ledbetter, Kenny Smith
- 2001: Jarret Johnson, Terry Jones, Jr., Saleem Rasheed, Tyler Watts, Andrew Zow
- 2002: Lane Bearden, Ahmaad Galloway, Jarret Johnson, Kenny King, Kindal Moorehead, Tyler Watts
- 2003: Derrick Pope, Shaud Williams
- 2004: Todd Bates, Wesley Britt
- 2005: Brodie Croyle, DeMeco Ryans
- 2006: Le'Ron McClain, Juwan Simpson
- 2007: Antoine Caldwell, Rashad Johnson, Darren Mustin
- 2008: John Parker Wilson, Rashad Johnson, Antoine Caldwell
- 2009: Javier Arenas, Mike Johnson, Rolando McClain
- 2010: Greg McElroy, Dont'a Hightower, Mark Barron
- 2011: Mark Barron, Dont'a Hightower, Trent Richardson
- 2012: Barrett Jones, Damion Square, Chance Warmack
- 2013: A. J. McCarron, C. J. Mosley, Kevin Norwood
- 2014: Amari Cooper, Jalston Fowler, Blake Sims
- 2015: Jake Coker, Derrick Henry, Ryan Kelly, Reggie Ragland
- 2016: Jonathan Allen, Reuben Foster, Eddie Jackson, Cam Robinson
- 2017: Minkah Fitzpatrick, Rashaan Evans, Shaun Dion Hamilton, Bradley Bozeman
- 2018: Damien Harris, Hale Hentges, Christian Miller, Ross Pierschbacher
- 2019: Anfernee Jennings, Xavier McKinney, DeVonta Smith, Tua Tagovailoa
- 2020: Landon Dickerson, Mac Jones, Alex Leatherwood, DeVonta Smith
- 2021: Will Anderson Jr., Phidarian Mathis, Evan Neal, Bryce Young
- 2022: Will Anderson Jr., Jordan Battle, Bryce Young
- 2023: Jalen Milroe, Malachi Moore, Dallas Turner
- 2024: Tyler Booker, Deontae Lawson, Jalen Milroe, Malachi Moore
