= Tyson DeVree =

American football player (born 1984)

No. 85, 80
- Position: Tight end

Personal information
- Born: November 12, 1984 (age 42); Hudsonville, Michigan, U.S.
- Listed height: 6 ft 6 in (1.98 m)
- Listed weight: 245 lb (111 kg)

Career information
- College: Western Michigan; Colorado
- NFL draft: 2008: undrafted

Career history
- New England Patriots (2008); Buffalo Bills (2009)*; Hartford Colonials (2010); Cleveland Browns (2010–2011)*; Indianapolis Colts (2011)*
- * Offseason or practice squad member only

Awards and highlights
- Second-team Freshman All-American (2003); Second-team All-MAC (2004)
- Stats at Pro Football Reference

Tyson DeVree (born November 12, 1984) is an American former professional football player who was a tight end in the National Football League (NFL). He was signed by the New England Patriots as an undrafted free agent in 2008. He last played college football for the Colorado Buffaloes.

He was also a member of the Buffalo Bills, Hartford Colonials, Cleveland Browns, and Indianapolis Colts.

== College career ==
DeVree attended the University of Colorado Boulder after transferring from Western Michigan following his sophomore year.

== Professional career ==
=== New England Patriots ===
DeVree was signed by the Patriots as an undrafted free agent on May 5, 2008, but was waived by the team on June 11. He was re-signed on August 19 and waived again on August 30 during final cuts.

DeVree was re-signed to the team's practice squad on September 1, released on September 4, and re-signed to the practice squad on September 17. He was promoted to the Patriots' active roster on November 17 after cornerback Terrence Wheatley was placed on injured reserve. He played in two regular season games and did not record a catch in either.

DeVree was waived by the Patriots on August 23, 2009.

=== Buffalo Bills ===
DeVree signed with the Buffalo Bills on September 1, 2009, but was released four days later, during final cuts.

=== Cleveland Browns ===
DeVree was signed to the Browns practice squad on December 7, 2010. He was waived on July 28, 2011.

=== Indianapolis Colts ===
DeVree was claimed off waivers on July 31, 2011 by the Indianapolis Colts.
