= Antoine Caldwell =

American football player (born 1986)

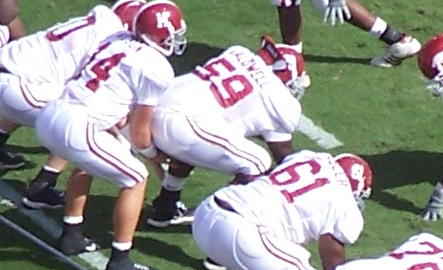
- Caldwell (#59) with Alabama in 2006

No. 62
- Positions: Center, guard

Personal information
- Born: April 19, 1986 (age 40); Tallassee, Alabama, U.S.
- Listed height: 6 ft 3 in (1.91 m)
- Listed weight: 315 lb (143 kg)

Career information
- High school: Lee (Montgomery, Alabama)
- College: Alabama
- NFL draft: 2009: 3rd round, 77th overall pick

Career history
- Houston Texans (2009−2012); Buffalo Bills (2013)*; Jacksonville Jaguars (2014)*
- * Offseason or practice squad member only

Awards and highlights
- Consensus All-American (2008); First-team All-SEC (2008); Second-team All-SEC (2006)

Career NFL statistics
- Games played: 39
- Games started: 19
- Stats at Pro Football Reference

Antoine Caldwell (born April 19, 1986) is an American former professional football player who was a center and guard in the National Football League (NFL). He played college football for the Alabama Crimson Tide, earning consensus All-American honors in 2008. He was selected by the Houston Texans in the third round of the 2009 NFL draft.

He was also a member of the Buffalo Bills and Jacksonville Jaguars.

== Early life ==
Caldwell was born in Montgomery, Alabama. He attended Robert E. Lee High School in Montgomery, where he was a standout lineman for his high school football team. Considered a three-star recruit by Rivals.com, Caldwell was listed as the No. 10 center prospect of his class.

== College career ==
Caldwell received an athletic scholarship to attend the University of Alabama, where he played for coach Mike Shula and coach Nick Saban's Alabama Crimson Tide football teams from 2005 to 2008. As a senior in 2008, he was recognized as a first-team All-Southeastern Conference (SEC) selection and a consensus first-team All-American.

=== Awards and honors ===
- 2005 Freshman first-team All-SEC (as selected by the league's coaches, who are not allowed to vote for their own players, and the Sporting News)
- 2005 Sporting News freshman All-American
- 2005 Rivals.com first-team freshman All-American
- 2006 Second-team All-SEC (Coaches)
- 2006, 2007, 2008 Rimington Trophy watchlist
- 2008 Rivals.com All-SEC second-team
- 2008 All-SEC first-team (Coaches)
- 2008 consensus first-team All-American (earned consensus status after being selected by the Associated Press, American Football Coaches Association, and Sporting News)

== Professional career ==
=== Houston Texans ===
Caldwell was graded as the No. 3 center available in the 2009 NFL draft, behind Alex Mack and Eric Wood. As projected, he was the third center selected off the board, in the third round by the Houston Texans.

From 2009 to 2012, Caldwell played 39 games, including 19 starts, for the Texans.

=== Buffalo Bills ===
Caldwell signed with the Buffalo Bills on July 28, 2013. He was released on August 30, 2013.

=== Jacksonville Jaguars ===
In May 2014, Caldwell went to Jaguars Rookie Mini-Camp on a tryout basis. He was not offered on contract. However, he was signed to the active roster on August 13, 2014. The Jaguars released Caldwell on August 24, 2014.
