= Leigh Tiffin =

American football player (born 1988)

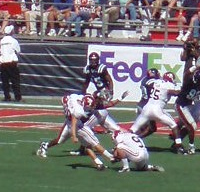
- Tiffin kicking an extra point for Alabama

No. 10
- Position: Placekicker

Personal information
- Born: August 3, 1988 (age 38); Muscle Shoals, Alabama, U.S.
- Listed height: 6 ft 2 in (1.88 m)
- Listed weight: 212 lb (96 kg)

Career information
- College: Alabama
- NFL draft: 2010: undrafted

Career history
- Cleveland Browns (2010)*
- * Offseason or practice squad member only

Awards and highlights
- BCS national champion (2010); First-team All-American (2009); First-team All-SEC (2009)

Van Leigh Tiffin Jr. (born August 3, 1988) is an American former college football player who was a kicker for the Alabama Crimson Tide. He was signed by the Cleveland Browns of the National Football League (NFL) as an undrafted free agent in 2010. Named for his father, Tiffin is called Leigh to distinguish him from Van Tiffin.

== College career ==
Tiffin, who wore number 99 for the Alabama Crimson Tide, got his chance to kick as a freshman following a groin injury to starting kicker Jamie Christensen. Tiffin was a hero, kicking the game-winning 47-yard field goal, in Alabama's 13–10 win over Vanderbilt on September 9, 2006. However, two weeks later against a very strong Arkansas team, he would miss three field goals in a 24–23 overtime loss, including the game-tying extra point. Christensen returned to the role the following week against Florida and except for two extra points against Florida International. Tiffin would be benched for the remainder of the season.

In 2007, he won the starting placekicking role over Christensen. The highlight of his sophomore year was when he went 4–4 in field goal attempts (39, 51, 29, 50) in a losing effort against Mississippi State. He was only the second kicker in Alabama football history to make two 50+ yard field goals in a game, the other being his father. His four kicks were Alabama's only points of the game. He finished the 2007 season converting all 36 extra point attempts and 25 of 34 field goal attempts.

In the 2008 Chick-fil-A College Kickoff, Tiffin kicked a 54-yard field goal, his career long, in a 34–10 victory over #9-ranked Clemson. He finished the season with 20 of 29 field goals and a semifinalist for the Lou Groza Award.

For the 2009 season, he was 30 for 35 on field goal attempts for 87.9 percent. After kicking a field goal against LSU, he became Alabama's all-time leading scorer with 350 points. That year, he was named Lou Groza Award "Star of the Week" three times and was a finalist for the Groza. In mid-December, Tiffin was named to the Associated Press All-American Team along with five other Crimson Tide players.

== Professional career ==
Tiffin was given a tryout with the Cleveland Browns as an undrafted free agent and agreed to a rookie free agent deal on May 3, 2010. He was waived/injured on May 18 and reverted to injured reserve. He was released from injured reserve with an injury settlement on May 26.

== Personal life ==
Tiffin, born in Muscle Shoals, Alabama, is the son of Mia Michelle (née Self) and Van Leigh Tiffin. His father, known as Van, was a former Crimson Tide kicker who was the hero of the 1985 Iron Bowl against rival Auburn. Leigh Tiffin graduated from Muscle Shoals High School.

Tiffin married Baylee Ann Ellson. They have two children.
