= Wallace Gilberry =

American football player (born 1984)

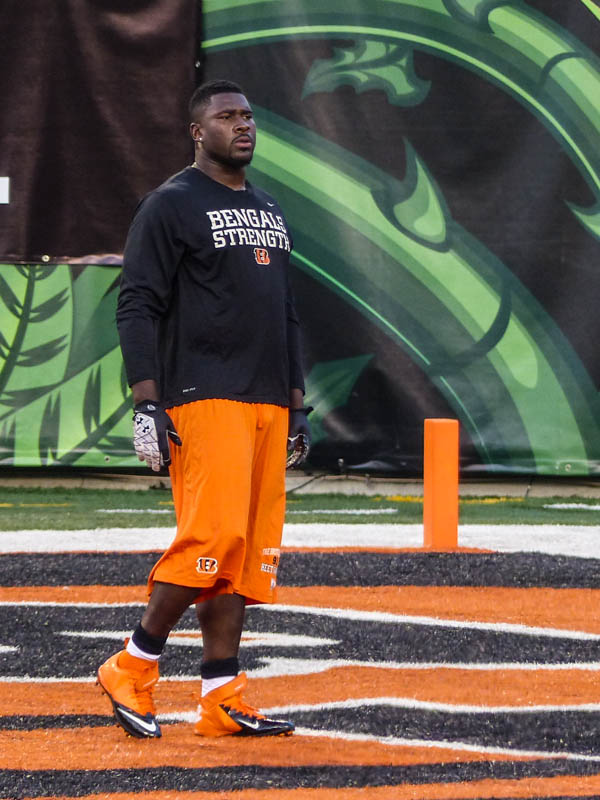
- Gilberry with the Cincinnati Bengals in 2013

No. 92, 94, 95
- Position: Defensive end

Personal information
- Born: December 5, 1984 (age 41); Bay Minette, Alabama, U.S.
- Listed height: 6 ft 2 in (1.88 m)
- Listed weight: 270 lb (122 kg)

Career information
- High school: Baldwin County (Bay Minette)
- College: Alabama
- NFL draft: 2008: undrafted

Career history
- New York Giants (2008)*; Kansas City Chiefs (2008–2011); Tampa Bay Buccaneers (2012); Cincinnati Bengals (2012–2015); Detroit Lions (2016); Cincinnati Bengals (2016)
- * Offseason or practice squad member only

Awards and highlights
- First-team All-SEC (2007)

Career NFL statistics
- Total tackles: 191
- Sacks: 34
- Forced fumbles: 7
- Fumble recoveries: 6
- Defensive touchdowns: 1
- Stats at Pro Football Reference

Wallace Gilberry (born December 5, 1984) is an American former professional football player who was a defensive end in the National Football League (NFL). He played college football for the Alabama Crimson Tide and was signed by the New York Giants as an undrafted free agent in 2008.

Gilberry was also a member of the Kansas City Chiefs, Tampa Bay Buccaneers, Cincinnati Bengals, and Detroit Lions.

In November 2023, Gilberry announced he was running for U.S. Congress in Alabama's 2nd congressional district as a Republican.

== Early life ==
Gilberry played his prep football at Baldwin County High School. In his junior season, Gilberry played primarily tight end where he started the last seven games. As a senior at defensive end, he made 61 solo tackles, 16 assists, seven sacks, seven tackles for losses, and deflected six passes. He also caused two fumbles, recovering both.

== College career ==
Gilberry attended the University of Alabama, where he was redshirted in 2003. He played from 2004-2007. He appeared in 50 games. He became a starter during his sophomore year.

He finished his career at Alabama with 188 tackles, 60.5 tackles for loss for -223 yards, 21.5 sacks for -135 yards, 5 forced fumbles, 3 fumble recoveries and 38 quarterback hurries.

He was a first-team selection to the All-SEC Coaches’ Football Team in 2007.

While at the University of Alabama, Gilberry was initiated into the Omega Psi Phi fraternity's Beta Eta chapter in the Fall of 2004.

== Professional career ==
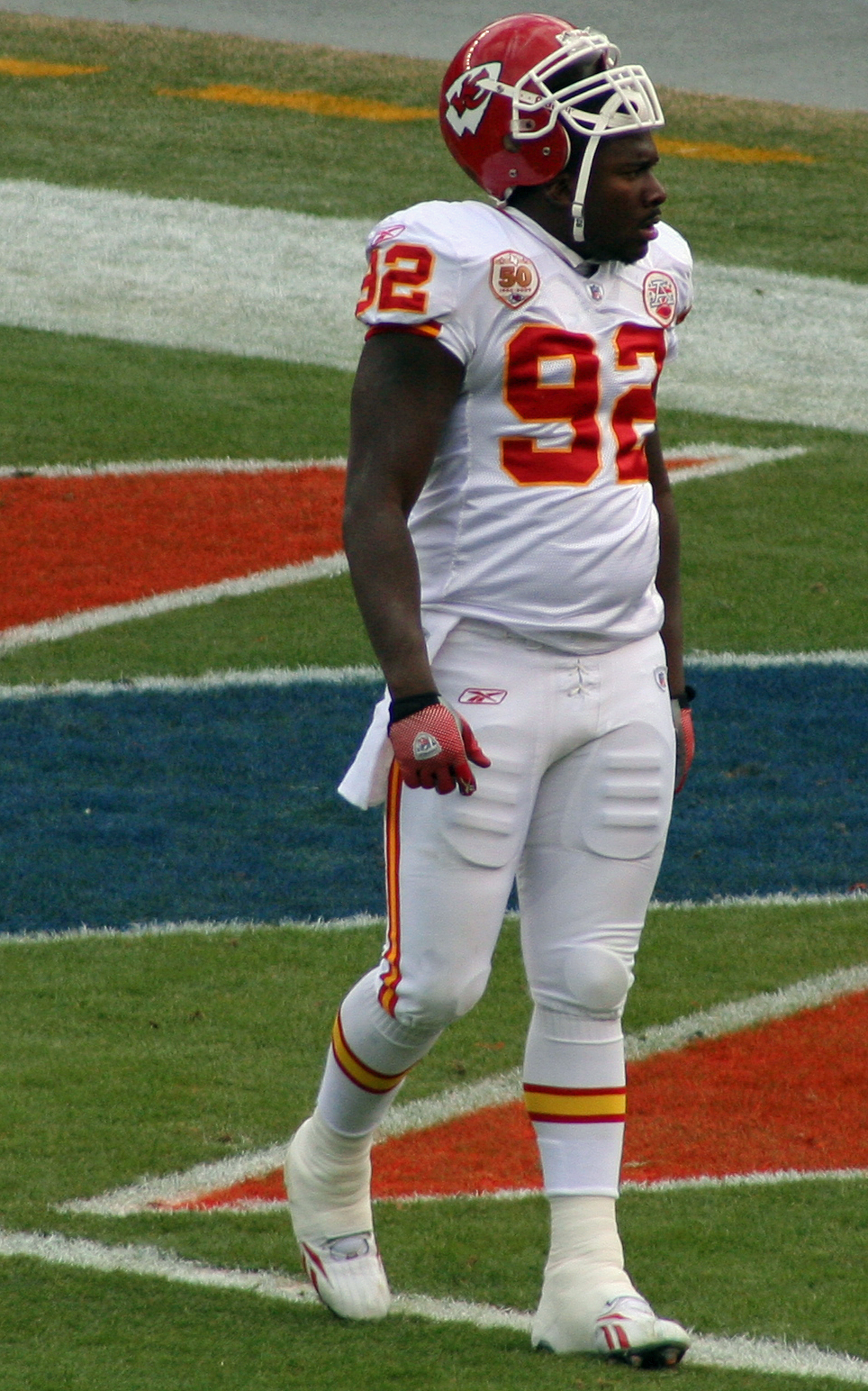
Gilberry with the Chiefs in January 2010

Pre-draft measurables
Height	Weight	Arm length	Hand span	40-yard dash	10-yard split	20-yard split	Vertical jump	Broad jump	Bench press
6 ft 2 1/4 in (1.89 m)	268 lb (122 kg)	33 3/4 in (0.86 m)	9 1/8 in (0.23 m)	5.00 s	1.67 s	2.85 s	30.0 in (0.76 m)	9 ft 10 in (3.00 m)	19 reps
All values from NFL Combine/Pro Day

=== New York Giants ===
Gilberry was signed by the New York Giants as an undrafted free agent in 2008, but was released by the team before the regular season began.

=== Kansas City Chiefs ===
Gilberry was signed to the Chiefs in August 2008. He made his NFL debut against the San Diego Chargers on November 9, recording one tackle.

In 2009, he had 20 tackles, two assists, and 4.5 sacks.

In 2010, Gilberry had 3 sacks in one game against the St. Louis Rams. In 2011, Gilberry forced a fumble on Tom Brady after coming from behind and tackling him, and recovered the football. After the 2011 NFL season, Gilberry was not offered a contract.

=== Tampa Bay Buccaneers ===
Gilberry signed with the Tampa Bay Buccaneers on June 4, 2012. He was released by the team on September 14.

=== Cincinnati Bengals (first stint) ===
Gilberry signed with the Cincinnati Bengals on September 18, 2012. On December 13, 2012, Gilberry recovered a fumble and ran into the endzone for his first career touchdown against the Philadelphia Eagles.

In 2012, he played in 14 games and accumulated a total of 69 tackles 42 solo and 20 assisted, 12.5 sacks, 7 forced fumble and 3 fumble returns.

On March 12, 2013, he re-signed with the Bengals on a three-year, $6.75 million deal.

So far as of week 4 of the 2013 season, he has accumulated a total of 55 tackles 35 solo and 20 assisted and 17 sacks.

=== Detroit Lions ===
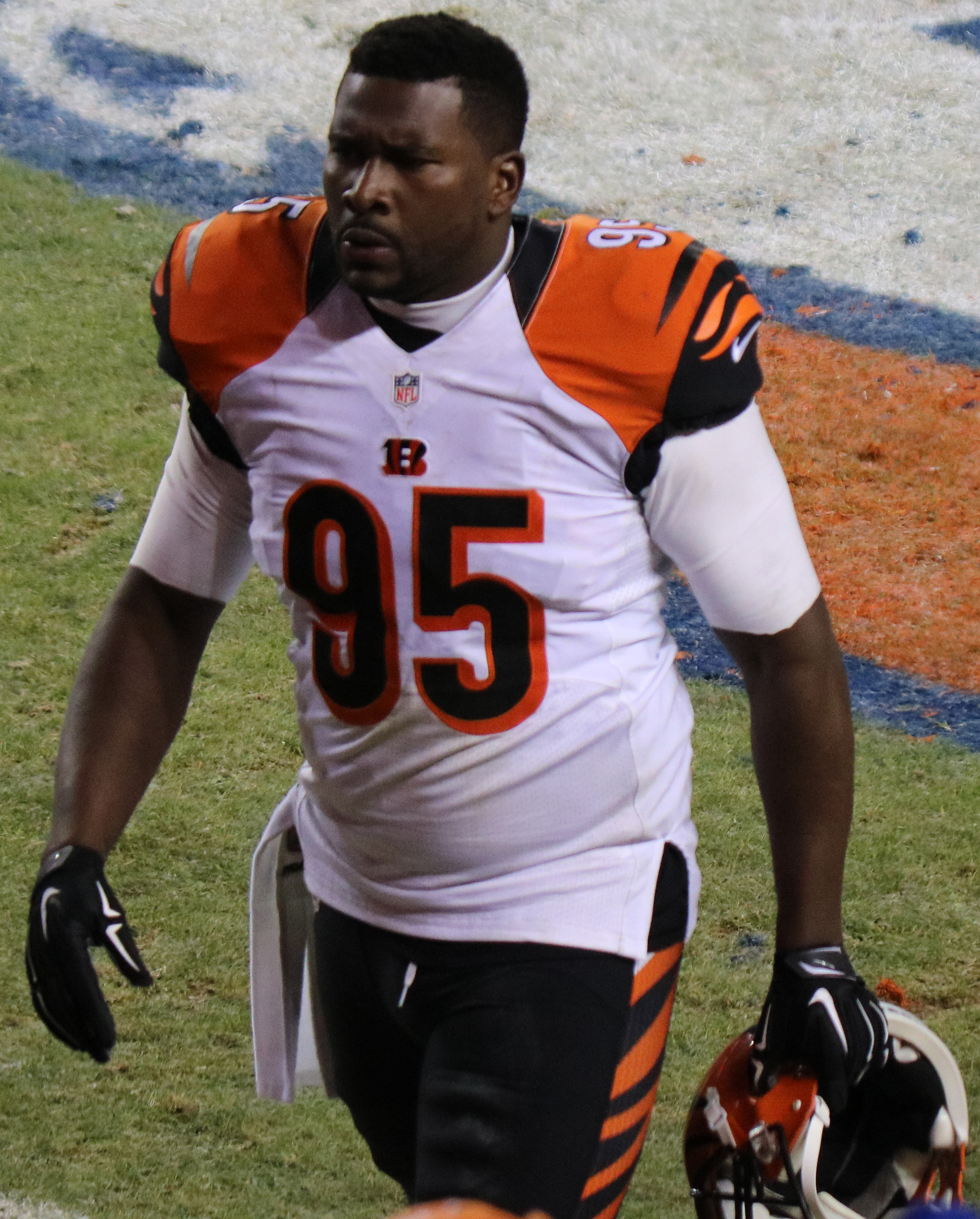
Gilberry with the Bengals in 2015

On April 4, 2016, Gilberry signed a one-year contract with the Detroit Lions. On October 4, 2016, he was placed on injured reserve with an abdomen injury. He was released by the team on October 11, 2016.

=== Cincinnati Bengals (second stint) ===
On November 7, 2016, Gilberry re-signed with the Bengals.

On March 24, 2017, Gilberry signed a one-year contract to remain with the Bengals. He was released on September 2, 2017.

On December 15, 2017, Gilberry announced his retirement from the NFL.

== NFL career statistics ==
Legend
	Led the league
**Bold**	Career high

=== Regular season ===
Year	Team	Games		Tackles					Interceptions					Fumbles			
Year	Team	GP	GS	Cmb	Solo	Ast	Sck	TFL	Int	Yds	TD	Lng	PD	FF	FR	Yds	TD
2008	KAN	5	0	2	2	0	0.0	0	0	0	0	0	0	0	0	0	0
2009	KAN	**16**	0	22	**20**	2	4.5	3	0	0	0	0	0	0	0	0	0
2010	KAN	**16**	2	23	19	4	7.0	**10**	0	0	0	0	1	**2**	2	0	0
2011	KAN	**16**	1	10	6	4	2.5	0	0	0	0	0	**3**	**2**	0	0	0
2012	CIN	14	0	24	15	9	6.5	6	0	0	0	0	0	1	**3**	**31**	**1**
2013	CIN	**16**	2	24	18	6	**7.5**	6	0	0	0	0	**3**	1	0	0	0
2014	CIN	**16**	**16**	**48**	19	**29**	1.5	4	0	0	0	0	2	0	1	0	0
2015	CIN	**16**	1	23	16	7	2.0	3	0	0	0	0	1	1	0	0	0
2016	DET	4	1	5	3	2	0.0	0	0	0	0	0	0	0	0	0	0
2016	CIN	5	0	10	8	2	2.5	3	0	0	0	0	0	0	0	0	0
		124	23	191	126	65	34.0	35	0	0	0	0	10	7	6	31	1

=== Playoffs ===
Year	Team	Games		Tackles					Interceptions					Fumbles			
Year	Team	GP	GS	Cmb	Solo	Ast	Sck	TFL	Int	Yds	TD	Lng	PD	FF	FR	Yds	TD
2010	KAN	**1**	0	0	0	0	0.0	0	0	0	0	0	0	0	0	0	0
2012	CIN	**1**	0	1	0	1	0.0	0	0	0	0	0	0	0	0	0	0
2013	CIN	**1**	0	**3**	**2**	1	0.0	0	0	0	0	0	0	0	0	0	0
2014	CIN	**1**	**1**	2	0	**2**	0.0	0	0	0	0	0	0	0	0	0	0
2015	CIN	**1**	**1**	1	0	1	0.0	0	0	0	0	0	0	0	0	0	0
		5	2	7	2	5	0.0	0	0	0	0	0	0	0	0	0	0

== Politics ==
On November 29, 2023, Gilberry announced his run for Alabama's 2nd congressional district in 2024 as a Republican. On January 8, 2024, Gilberry suspended his campaign for the congressional seat.
