= John Parker Wilson =

American football player (born 1985)

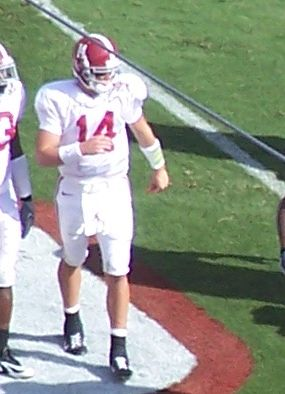
- Wilson during his time at Alabama

No. 14
- Position: Quarterback

Personal information
- Born: October 17, 1985 (age 41); Montgomery, Alabama, U.S.
- Listed height: 6 ft 2 in (1.88 m)
- Listed weight: 217 lb (98 kg)

Career information
- High school: Hoover (Hoover, Alabama)
- College: Alabama
- NFL draft: 2009: undrafted

Career history
- Atlanta Falcons (2009–2011); Jacksonville Jaguars (2012); Pittsburgh Steelers (2013)*
- * Offseason or practice squad member only
- Stats at Pro Football Reference

John Parker Wilson (born October 17, 1985) is an American former professional football player who was a quarterback in the National Football League (NFL). Wilson played college football at the University of Alabama. He went undrafted during the 2009 NFL draft before signing with the Atlanta Falcons.

== College career ==
=== Freshman season ===
After helping lead Hoover High School to high school state championships in 2002 and 2003, Wilson accepted a scholarship offer to play for the Alabama Crimson Tide. At the time, he also had scholarship offers from several Southeastern Conference schools, including Alabama's rival, Tennessee. He saw limited playing time during his freshman year, backing up full-time starter Brodie Croyle. His first career touchdown came against South Carolina, a 36-yard pass to wide receiver Keith Brown, in Alabama's 37–14 rout of the Gamecocks. Wilson led a late touchdown drive against Auburn when Alabama was behind 28–10 and he added a two-point conversion pass to make the final score 28–18. He would finish the season with only 98 yards and two touchdowns.

=== Sophomore season ===
In 2006, Wilson started all 13 games for the Crimson Tide. He finished the season with a passing efficiency of 128.92, completing 216–of–379 passes for 2,707 yards, 17 touchdowns, and ten interceptions. He threw for over 200 yards in the first seven games of the season, setting a new school record, and finished with a school record nine 200-yard games.

- His best game was at Arkansas (completing 80.0% of his passes for 243 yards, three touchdowns, and no interceptions)
- He had strong performances at LSU (completing 62.9% of his passes, throwing for 291 yards, two touchdowns, and 1 interception), and against Ole Miss (completing 57.1% of his passes, throwing for 206 yards, two touchdowns and no interceptions)
- He had a solid performance in a loss against rival Auburn (completing 54.5% of his passes for 252 yards, two touchdowns, and one interception). Wilson also fumbled twice on sacks against Auburn and both fumbles were recovered by Auburn which set up touchdowns for Auburn. He was intercepted by David Irons late in the fourth quarter to seal the win for Auburn.
- His worst games were against Mississippi State (completing only 48.7% of his passes and throwing two interceptions), at Florida (completing 52.5% of his passes, but throwing three interceptions), and at Tennessee (completing only 44.8% of his passes).

=== Junior season ===
In 2007, Wilson started 13 games for Alabama in head coach Nick Saban's first year. His passer rating was 114.6, completing 255–of–462 passes for 2,846 yards, 18 touchdowns (a school record) and 12 interceptions. He was sacked 25 times during the season. His best performance was against rival Tennessee, in which he completed 32 of 46 passing attempts for 367 yards and three touchdowns. Another notable performance was his winning touchdown against Arkansas with eight seconds left in the game. Against Auburn, Wilson scored on a quarterback sneak and had a tipped pass intercepted in the end zone by Jerraud Powers of Auburn in a 17–10 loss, which was Alabama's sixth straight loss to Auburn.

=== Senior season ===
In his senior season, Wilson was again the starting quarterback, ahead of Greg McElroy. He led the Crimson Tide to a 12–2 season, with victories against #9 Clemson Tigers, #3 Georgia Bulldogs, and #15 LSU Tigers. In the regular season finale, he led Alabama to 36–0 victory over in-state rival Auburn in the Iron Bowl, ending a six-game losing streak to the Tigers. After finishing the regular season 12–0, #1 Alabama eventually lost to #2 Florida in the SEC Championship Game. In the 2009 Sugar Bowl, Alabama was defeated by the Utah Utes by a score of 31–17.

When his career at Alabama ended, Wilson was amongst the most prolific quarterbacks in school history.

== Professional career ==
Pre-draft measurables
Height	Weight	40-yard dash	20-yard shuttle	Three-cone drill	Vertical jump	Broad jump
6 ft 2 in (1.88 m)	219 lb (99 kg)	4.87 s	4.59 s	7.53 s	29.5 in (0.75 m)	8 ft 9 in (2.67 m)
All values from NFL Combine

=== Atlanta Falcons ===
Wilson was signed by the Atlanta Falcons after going undrafted in the 2009 NFL draft. He did not play in any regular season games. Wilson played most of the game during the 2010 preseason game against the New England Patriots. He assisted in scoring one touchdown during that game. He was released during final cuts on September 3, 2011, and re-signed to the Falcons' practice squad the following day. On December 2, 2011, it was reported that the Vikings tried to sign Wilson off of the Falcons practice squad. Instead, Wilson chose to sign to the Falcons' 53 man roster. On August 26, 2012, he was waived by the Falcons in order for the team to maintain a league mandatory 75-man roster during the preseason.

=== Jacksonville Jaguars ===
Wilson was signed to the Jacksonville Jaguars practice squad on September 1, 2012. He was promoted to the active roster on October 27 and released on October 29. He was signed back to the practice squad on October 31. Wilson was signed to the active roster after the conclusion of the 2012 season. He was released by the team on February 27, 2013.

=== Pittsburgh Steelers ===
One day after being released by the Jacksonville Jaguars, the Pittsburgh Steelers claimed Wilson off waivers. The Steelers were the only NFL franchise to make a claim for Wilson. Wilson was later released by the Steelers on August 25, 2013.

After his time with the Steelers, Wilson did not sign with another NFL team.

== Personal life ==
After his football career, he became a financial adviser, currently working for Morgan Stanley.

Wilson rejoined Alabama in 2017 to assist in practice with the scout team, mimicking the mannerisms and play of LSU quarterback Danny Etling to prepare the team.

On July 26, 2018, Wilson agreed to become the new color commentator for Alabama football.

Wilson is married and lives with his wife in Birmingham.
