= Alabama Crimson Tide football under Nick Saban =

History of the football program from 2007 to 2023

Alabama Crimson Tide
- Saban during Alabama's spring game in 2010
- Athletic director: Mal Moore (2007–2013); Bill Battle (2013–2017); Greg Byrne (2017–2023) (Note: Byrne remained the athletic director after Saban's retirement, and is still in the position as of 2026.)
- Head coach: Nick Saban; 17th season, 201–29 (.874)
- Stadium: Bryant–Denny Stadium
- Conference: Southeastern Conference
- Division: Western Division
- Colors: Crimson and white
- Bowl record: 16–7 (.696)

National championships
- Claimed: 6
- Unclaimed: 1

Conference championships
- 9

Division championships
- 10
- Heisman winners: 4
- Consensus All-Americans: 47

Nick Saban was the head coach of the Alabama Crimson Tide football program from 2007 until his retirement after the 2023 season. Alabama played as part of the National Collegiate Athletic Association (NCAA) Football Bowl Subdivision (FBS) and was a member of the West Division of the Southeastern Conference (SEC). The Tide played its home games at Bryant–Denny Stadium in Tuscaloosa, Alabama. Their overall official record under Saban was 201–29 (Note: Saban's record for the 2007 season was 7–6. In March 2009, the NCAA ruled that Alabama must vacate 21 victories due to sanctions stemming from textbook-related infractions discovered during the 2007 season, including five for the 2007 season. As such Saban's official record for the 2007 season stands at 2–6.) (.878) (206–29 on the field), 23 bowl game appearances with 16 victories, ten SEC West titles, nine SEC championships, and six national championships. From 2008 up until his retirement, Saban's teams spent part or all of each season ranked number 1 in national polls.

On January 3, 2007, Saban officially accepted the head coaching position with the Crimson Tide. In 2008, Saban led them to their first undefeated regular season since 92–93, but they lost the SEC Championship Game and the Sugar Bowl. In 2009, Saban led Alabama to a perfect 14–0 and its first BCS National Championship, as well as its first overall national championship since 1992. After a relatively disappointing 10–3 2010 season, Saban led the Tide to back-to-back BCS National Championships in the 2011 and 2012 seasons. The 2013 team won its first eleven games but failed to capture a third consecutive national championship, losing the last two.

Saban's 2014 team won the SEC West and SEC championships, then lost to Ohio State in the inaugural College Football Playoff's semi-final round at the Sugar Bowl, finishing 12–2. Saban won his fourth national championship at Alabama in 2015 and his fifth at the new Mercedes-Benz Stadium in 2017. In 2018, the team experienced many highs and lows, losing the National Championship Game to No.2 Clemson. Saban won his sixth national championship at Alabama and seventh of his career in 2020 by defeating Ohio State 52–24. The win gave Saban the most national titles of all time, breaking Paul Bear Bryant's previous record of six, at the same school.

Before Saban, Alabama had no Heisman Trophy winners, and many players who competed at Alabama during Saban's tenure were also recognized for their on-field accomplishments. Mark Ingram II (2009), Derrick Henry (2015), DeVonta Smith (2020) and Bryce Young (2021) are Alabama's four Heisman Trophy winners, with Young taking 83% of voters. 76 players were recognized as First Team All-Americans, 47 by consensus or unanimously. Additionally, 133 former Crimson Tide players were drafted into the National Football League, 47 as first-round selections, under Coach Saban.

== Overview ==
=== Hiring ===
After four seasons as head coach in which he compiled an overall record of 26 (Note: Shula's overall record at time of his firing was 26–23. In March 2009, the NCAA ruled that Alabama must vacate 21 victories due to sanctions stemming from textbook-related infractions discovered during the 2007 season, including 16 for the 2005 and 2006 seasons. As such Shula's official record at Alabama stands at 10–23.)–23 (.531) on November 26, 2006, Mike Shula was fired as head coach of the Crimson Tide. At the time of his firing, athletic director Mal Moore promoted defensive coordinator Joe Kines into the role of interim head coach for the Independence Bowl and that the search for a permanent replacement would begin immediately. At that time several current coaches were rumored to be in consideration for the position at Alabama, with Steve Spurrier of South Carolina and Saban of the Miami Dolphins thought to be the preferred candidates. On November 27, Saban publicly stated he had not been contacted by Alabama and that he had no interest in leaving the Dolphins to become the head coach of the Crimson Tide.

In early December, Moore made a preliminary offer to Saban's agent Jimmy Sexton to coach at Alabama for $5 million per season for seven years with a $7 million signing bonus. At that time Saban also stated he had not personally interviewed at Alabama and told his players that he was not leaving. After West Virginia head coach Rich Rodriguez turned down an offer to coach the Crimson Tide, speculation again focused on Saban. As the rumors persisted that he was prepared to take the Alabama job, on December 21 Saban stated "I guess I have to say it, I'm not going to be the Alabama coach" in an effort to stop the Alabama rumors. After the Dolphins season ended, it was speculated again that Alabama was to offer their head coaching position to Saban. On January 3, 2007, Saban officially resigned from the Dolphins and became the head coach of the Crimson Tide. At that time he signed an eight-year contract worth a guaranteed $32 million to coach Alabama.

=== First season ===
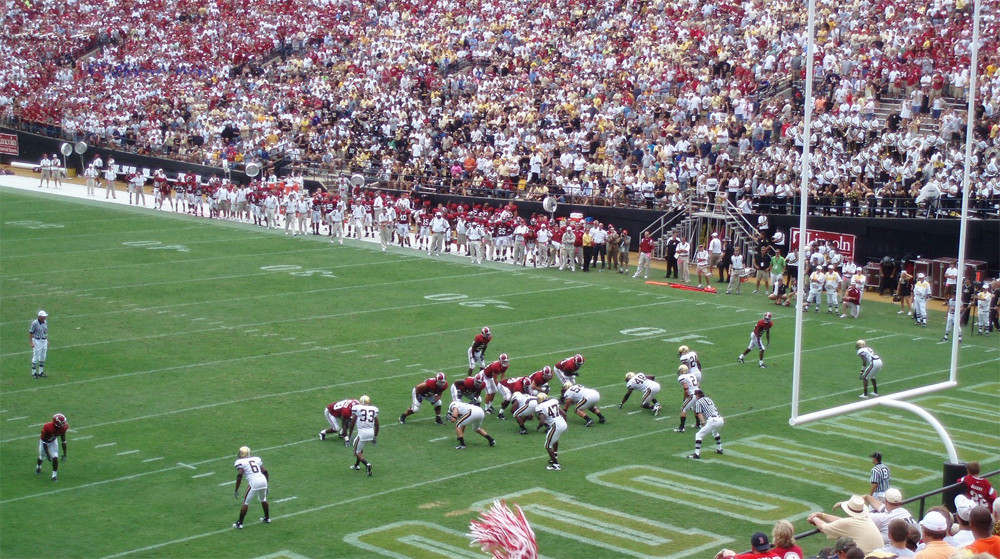
Alabama attempts a two-point conversion in their 24–10 victory at Vanderbilt on September 8, 2007.

After his hiring, Saban worked to hire his first staff and complete his first recruiting class with the Crimson Tide. His staff did not include any of Shula's former staff, and Kevin Steele was hired as defensive coordinator and Major Applewhite as offensive coordinator. On February 7, he landed his first recruiting class that was highly ranked by the major recruiting services in spite of having just over a month to complete it. Anticipation for his first season continued to build through his first spring practices, and reached its peak when an overflow crowd of 92,138 attended the A-Day spring game on April 21.

In Saban's debut as head coach, the Crimson Tide defeated Western Carolina for his first win at Alabama. They followed that victory with his first road win at Vanderbilt and his first win over a ranked opponent against No. 16 Arkansas for a 3–0 record to open the season. They entered the polls at the No. 16 position, but then lost in overtime at home against Georgia and in the River City Showdown at Jacksonville Municipal Stadium to Florida State. Alabama rebounded with three consecutive wins over Houston on homecoming, at Ole Miss and at home over Tennessee.

Prior to their game against the Vols, Antoine Caldwell, Marlon Davis, Glen Coffee, Marquis Johnson and Chris Rogers were suspended as a result of violating NCAA rules. The violation was a result of a failure in the distribution system of textbooks that was deemed to be an improper benefits as defined by the NCAA. After the NCAA reviewed the case, in June 2009 they determined all players who received the improper benefits to be retroactively ineligible. As part of their penalty, the NCAA forced Alabama to vacate football victories that dated back to the 2005 season through the first five games of the 2007 season.

After their victory over Tennessee, the Crimson Tide lost their four remaining regular season games. Against his former team LSU, the Crimson Tide lost to the eventual national champions in what was dubbed "the Saban Bowl". They followed that with a loss at Mississippi State and against Louisiana–Monroe in one of the bigger upsets of the 2007 season. After their sixth consecutive loss to Auburn in the Iron Bowl, Alabama closed the season with a victory over Colorado in the Independence Bowl and finished the season with a winning record at 7–6 in Saban's first season.

=== 2008 season ===
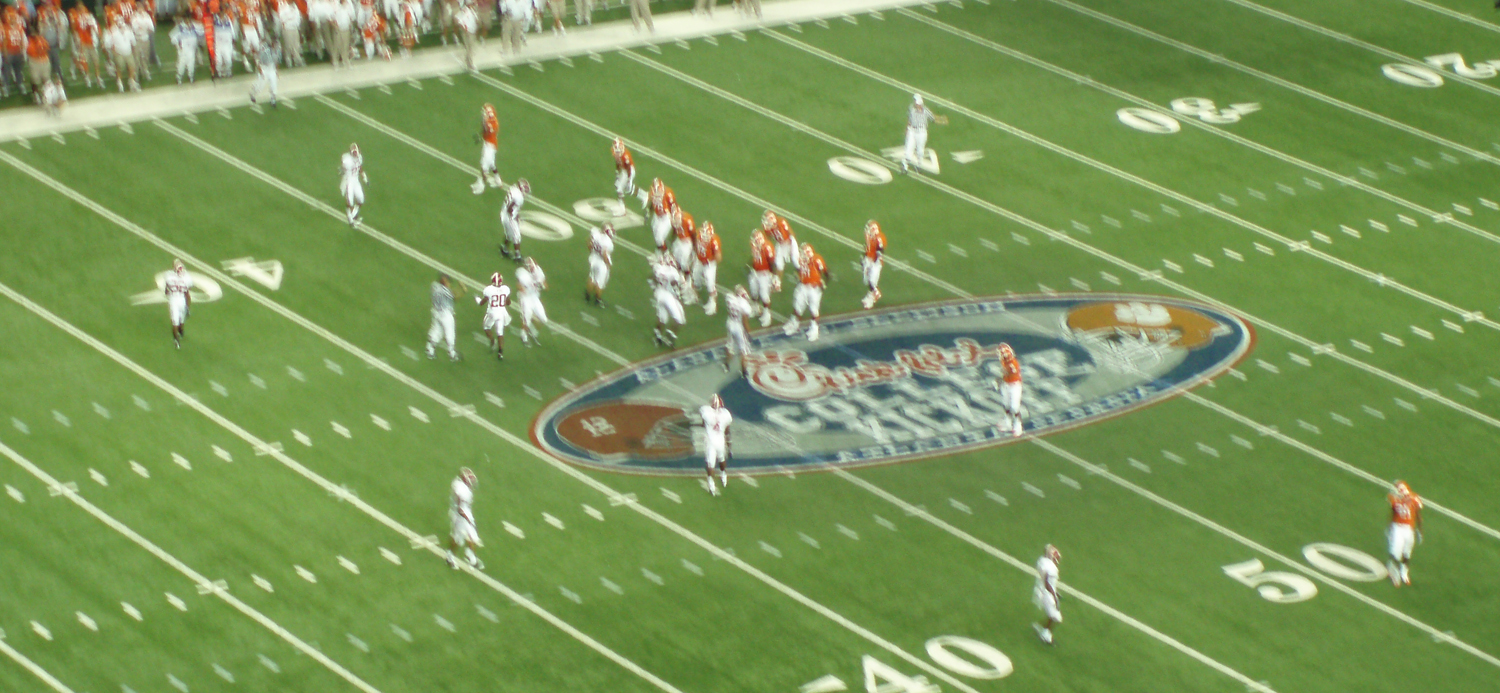
Alabama lines up on defense during their 34–10, season opening victory against Clemson at the Georgia Dome.

Looking to improve on their 7–6 record from the previous season, Alabama signed the top recruiting class as determined by a wide variety of selectors. The class featured many players who were later drafted into the NFL and formed the foundation for their championship run from 2009 through 2012. Players from the class included future first round draft picks Marcell Dareus, Julio Jones, Mark Barron, Dont'a Hightower, and Mark Ingram II. The Crimson Tide then completed spring practice with another large A-Day crowd before the season started later in the fall.

The Crimson Tide opened the season ranked No. 24, and they defeated No. 9 Clemson in the inaugural Chick-fil-A College Kickoff to open the season. They followed the victory with home wins over Tulane and Western Kentucky and won on the road over Arkansas before a much-hyped game at Georgia. Ranked No. 8 and playing against the No. 3 Bulldogs in what was deemed a "blackout" game by Georgia head coach Mark Richt, the Crimson Tide took a 31–0 halftime lead en route to a 41–30 upset victory. After their win, the Crimson Tide moved into the No. 2 ranking and then defeated Kentucky, Ole Miss, Tennessee and Arkansas State on homecoming to extend their record to 9–0.

After No. 1 Texas lost to Texas Tech, the Crimson Tide achieved their first regular season No. 1 ranking in the AP Poll since the 1980 season and their first ever No. 1 Bowl Championship Series (BCS) ranking prior to their game at LSU. In what was Saban's first game at Tiger Stadium since he resigned as LSU's coach after their 2004 season, the Crimson Tide defeated the Tigers 27–21 in overtime. The victory over LSU also allowed the Crimson Tide to clinch the SEC West Division championship, and earned a spot in the SEC Championship Game. Alabama then closed with wins over Mississippi State and Auburn, that ended their six-game losing streak in the Iron Bowl, and finished the regular season undefeated 12–0. Although favored, a two touchdown rally led by Florida's Tim Tebow in the fourth quarter resulted in the Crimson Tide failing to capture the SEC championship and instead of playing for a national championship, they accepted an invitation to play in the Sugar Bowl. Against an undefeated Utah team, Alabama was upset 31–17 and finished the season with an overall record of 12–2.

=== First national championship ===
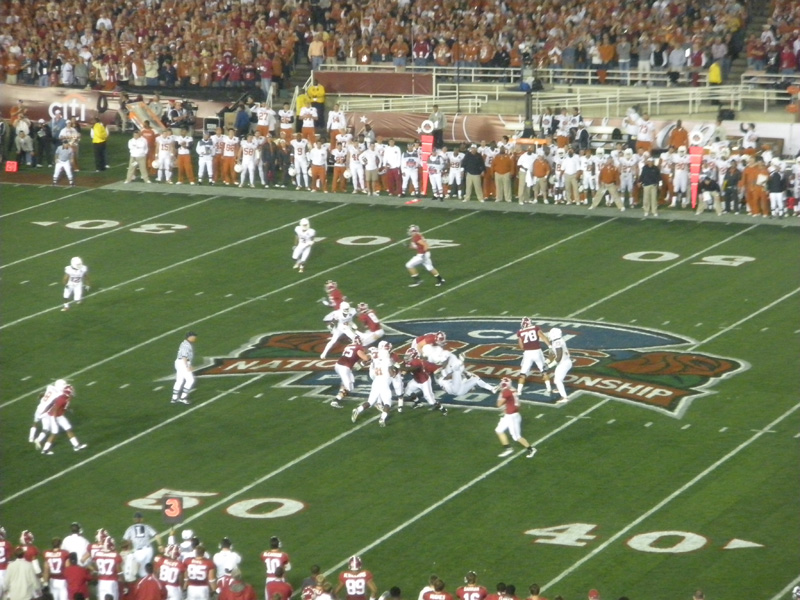
Alabama defeated Texas for the first time in school history 37–21 for the BCS national championship.

Although they reached their first BCS game since the 1999 season, Alabama looked improve for the 2009 season after they closed 2008 on a two-game losing streak after a 12–0 start to the year. Again, the Crimson Tide secured one of the top ranked recruiting classes for the third consecutive season in February 2009. Just as in the previous year, the 2009 class included many players who played significant roles in their championship run. These players included first round NFL draft picks James Carpenter, Dre Kirkpatrick, Trent Richardson, D. J. Fluker, and Chance Warmack in addition to Eddie Lacy and A. J. McCarron. In the annual A-Day game, the Crimson team defeated the White team by a score of 14–7 before 84,050 fans at Bryant–Denny Stadium.

For the second year in a row, Alabama opened the season at Atlanta in the Chick-fil-A Kickoff Game. Against Virginia Tech, the Crimson Tide trailed at halftime, but an 18-point rally in the fourth quarter gave Alabama the 34–24 win. After consecutive wins over non-conference Florida International and North Texas, the Crimson Tide defeated Arkansas 35–7 to open conference play at Bryant–Denny Stadium. Alabama next went on a two-game road trip, defeated both Kentucky and Ole Miss and extended their record to 6–0.

The Crimson Tide then returned home where they played South Carolina on homecoming. Against the Gamecocks, Mark Ingram II had a career-high with 246 rushing yards and entered the Heisman Trophy conversation as he led Alabama to a 20–6 victory. In their next game, a pair of Terrence Cody blocked field goals, one of which came as time expired, preserved a 12–10 win over rival Tennessee. With a berth in the SEC Championship Game on the line, the Crimson Tide clinched the West division championship with a 24–15 victory LSU in their next game. Alabama then closed the season with wins over Mississippi State, Chattanooga and Auburn and completed their second consecutive, undefeated regular season.

In the SEC Championship Game, Alabama faced East division champion Florida for the second season in a row in a No. 1 versus No. 2 matchup. With both the conference championship and a berth in the 2010 BCS National Championship Game on the line, the Crimson Tide defeated the Gators 32–13 and won the SEC for the first time since 1999. At the conclusion of the regular season, Mark Ingram II won the first Heisman Trophy in Alabama history with the closest margin of victory in the history of the award over Toby Gerhart. The Crimson Tide then closed the season with a 37–21 victory over Texas to finish a perfect 14–0 and recorded their first national championship since the 1992 season and their 13th overall in the history of the program.

=== 2010 season ===
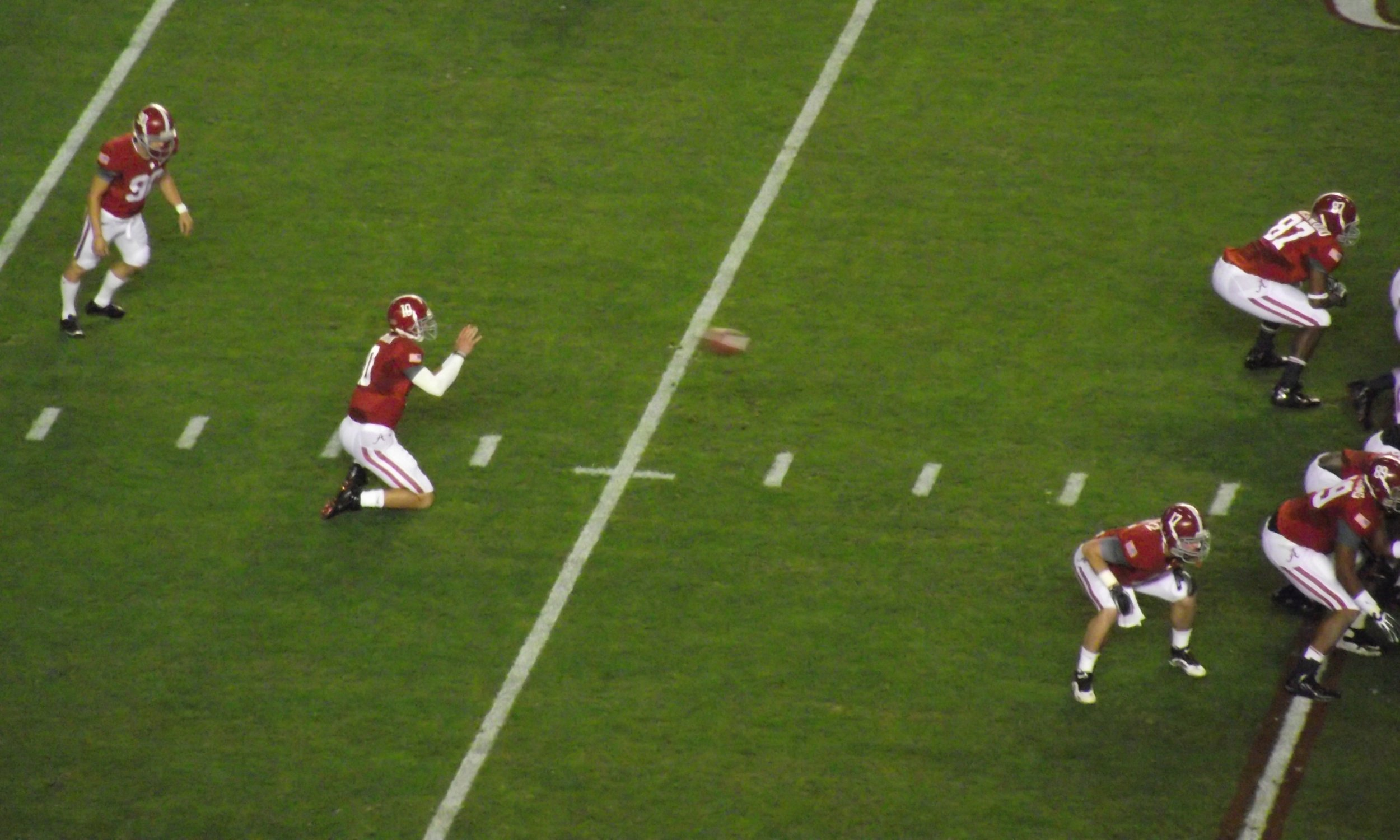
Jeremy Shelley made two field goals in Alabama's 30–10 win over Mississippi State.

As the defending national champions, Alabama entered the 2010 season as the favorite to repeat and win their second national championship in as many years. After again signing a highly rated recruiting class, the Crimson Tide opened the season in the No. 1 position in the polls. Alabama then won their first five games over San Jose State, Penn State, Duke, Arkansas, and Florida and retained their unanimous No. 1 ranking. However, in their sixth game, the Crimson Tide lost their first regular season game since the 2007 season when they were upset at South Carolina 35–21.

They rebounded the next week with a 23–10 win over Ole Miss on homecoming and at Tennessee by a margin of 41–10 before their top ten matchup at LSU. Against the Tigers, a late Stevan Ridley touchdown run set up by a 23-yard DeAngelo Peterson run on a fourth-down play gave LSU the upset victory and effectively ended the opportunity for an Alabama repeat of the national championship.

The Crimson Tide then defeated Mississippi State and Georgia State prior to their season finale against Auburn. With the No. 2 Tigers still in the national championship picture, Auburn overcame a 24–0 deficit and won 28–27 in what was the largest comeback in Iron Bowl history. Alabama then closed the season with a 49–7 victory over Michigan State, Saban's former two-time employer, in the Capital One Bowl and finished with an overall record of 10–3.

=== Second national championship ===
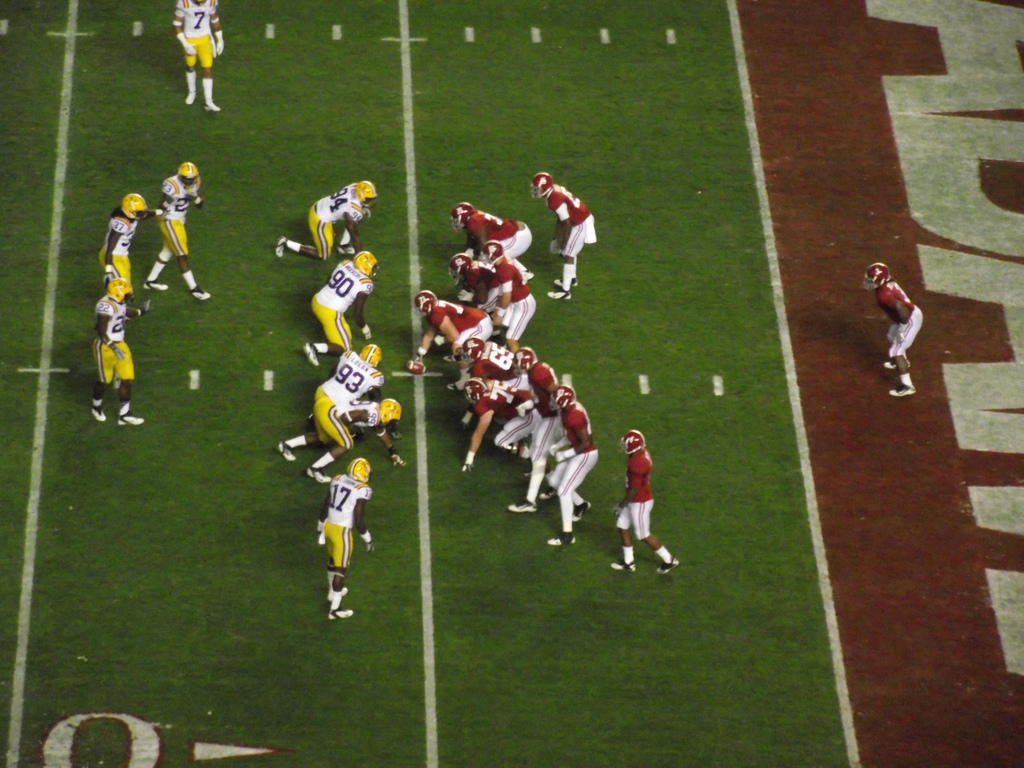
The Alabama offense lines up against the LSU defense in their 9–6 overtime loss.

After a disappointing 2010 season in which they opened the year as a national title favorite and ended with three losses, the Crimson Tide looked to regain their championship form for the 2011 campaign. After again signing one of the top recruiting classes in the country, and going through spring practice, tragedy struck Tuscaloosa on April 27, 2011, when an EF4 rated tornado devastated the city. The tornado resulted in the deaths of 43 people in the city, including the girlfriend of Crimson Tide long snapper Carson Tinker, and the team later dedicated their season to both the victims and survivors of the storm.

The Crimson Tide opened the season with a 48–7 victory over Saban's alma mater, Kent State and then traveled to Beaver Stadium and defeated Penn State 27–11 in what would be Joe Paterno's final meeting vs. the Crimson Tide (he was fired November 9, 2011 in the wake of the Jerry Sandusky child sex abuse scandal, then died January 22, 2012). After a 41–0 shutout over North Texas, Alabama opened conference play with a 38–14 victory over Arkansas. After they defeated Florida 38–10 at Gainesville, the Crimson Tide shutout Vanderbilt 34–0, and defeated both Ole Miss and Tennessee to set up a "Game of the Century" against LSU.

Against the Tigers, neither team scored a touchdown and LSU won by a final score of 9–6 in overtime. With the loss, Alabama dropped into the No. 3 BCS position prior to their game against Mississippi State. They regained the No. 2 ranking in all the polls after Oklahoma State was upset by Iowa State, and they defeated the Bulldogs at Starkville. Alabama then closed the regular season with wins over both Georgia Southern and Auburn and finished in second place in the West division behind LSU.

After the Tigers won the SEC Championship Game, a rematch against the Crimson Tide became the likely pairing for the 2012 BCS National Championship Game. Alabama qualified for the BCS National Championship Game after they received a final BCS score of .942, just slightly ahead of Oklahoma State's BCS score of .933. In their rematch against LSU at the Mercedes-Benz Superdome in New Orleans, the Crimson Tide shutout the SEC champion Tigers 21–0 and captured Alabama's second BCS championship and 14th overall national championship.

=== Third national championship ===
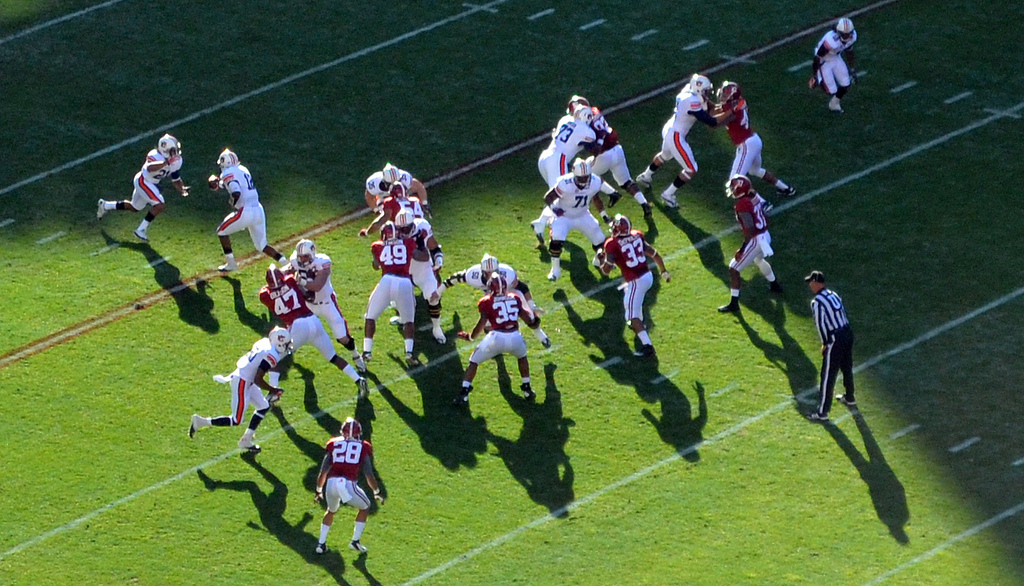
The Alabama defense in motion during their 49–0 victory over Auburn.

After they captured their second national championship in three years, Alabama again signed one of the nation's top recruiting classes in February 2012. After they completed spring practice in April, the Crimson Tide entered the season with a No. 2 ranking and as a favorite to repeat as national champions. Alabama opened the season with a 41–14 victory over Michigan in the Cowboys Classic. After their win over the Wolverines, the Crimson Tide moved into the No. 1 ranking prior to their game against Western Kentucky that they won 35–0 in their home opener. The next week, Alabama posted their second consecutive shutout with their 52–0 win at Arkansas to open conference play. The Crimson Tide then returned to Tuscaloosa and defeated Florida Atlantic and Ole Miss prior to their first win over Missouri as conference foes at Faurot Field.

Next Alabama defeated rival Tennessee 44–13 at Neyland Stadium and followed that with a 38–7 win over then undefeated and No. 13 ranked Mississippi State. The Crimson Tide then defeated LSU at Tiger Stadium 21–17 when A. J. McCarron threw a screen pass to T. J. Yeldon that he took 28 yards for the game-winning touchdown within the final minute of play. However, the next week, Alabama suffered their only loss of the season when Texas A&M upset the Tide 29–24 in Tuscaloosa.

After their loss to the Aggies, Alabama dropped into the No. 4 ranking for their 49–0 win over Western Carolina. In the evening after their win over the Catamounts, Alabama moved back into the No. 2 position as a result of upset losses for both Kansas State and Oregon. Alabama then closed the regular season with a 49–0 win over Auburn and captured the SEC West division title to play Georgia in the SEC Championship Game. In the championship game, Alabama escaped with a 32–28 win after the Bulldogs were stopped inside the Crimson Tide's five-yard line as time expired and captured the SEC Championship and a berth in the BCS National Championship Game against Notre Dame. In the BCS Championship Game, the Tide defeated the Irish 42–14 and captured their third national championship in four years and the schools 15th overall football championship.

=== 2013 season ===
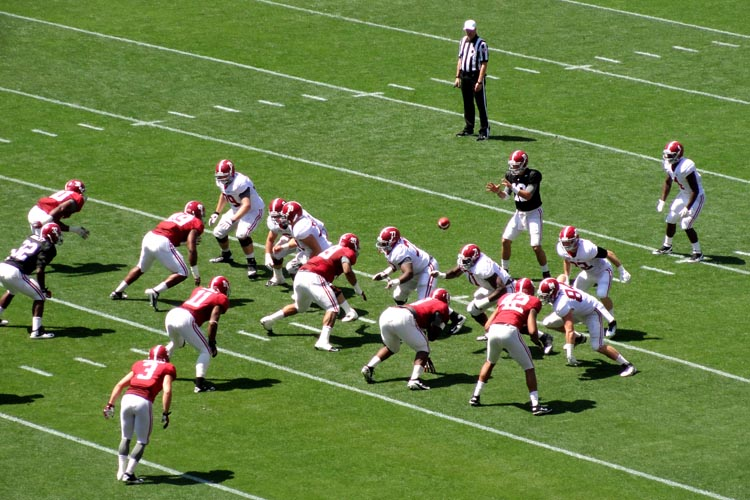
A. J. McCarron takes a snap for the White team at the 2013 A-Day Game.

As the two-time defending national champions, Alabama entered the 2013 season as the favorite to repeat and win their third consecutive national championship and their fourth in five years. After again signing a highly rated recruiting class, the Crimson Tide opened the season in the No. 1 position in the polls. Alabama then won their first eleven games and retained their unanimous No. 1 ranking throughout. The Crimson Tide opened the season with a victory over Virginia Tech in the Chick-fil-A Kickoff Game at Atlanta. After their first bye week Alabama traveled to Kyle Field where they defeated Texas A&M in a 49–42 shootout that saw the Aggies have the best offensive day against a Crimson Tide defense in the history of the program.

The defense responded after the A&M game and did not allow a touchdown over the next 14-quarters in victories over Colorado State, Ole Miss, Georgia State and Kentucky. After the touchdown-free streak ended, started a three-game homestand that saw Alabama shutout Arkansas and defeat both Tennessee and LSU in back-to-back rivalry games. They next defeated Mississippi State and Chattanooga that set up a top five matchup against Auburn.

In the Iron Bowl, Alabama kicker Adam Griffith attempted and missed a 57-yard field goal attempt as time expired in regulation. In what was since dubbed "The Kick Six", Chris Davis returned the missed field goal 109 yards (officially, 100 yards; unlike the NFL, the NCAA only counts return yardage from goal line to goal line) for the game-winning score with no time left on the clock to clinch a 34–28 Auburn victory. As the loss also cost the Crimson Tide an opportunity to play for both the SEC and national championships, they were selected to play in the 2014 Sugar Bowl. In the game, Alabama was defeated by Oklahoma 45–31 and closed the season with an overall record of 11–2.

=== 2014 season ===
Alabama entered the 2014 season ranked #3 in the polls. The Crimson Tide rolled off four straight victories before losing to Ole Miss 17–23. Their loss to Ole Miss dropped them down to #7 in the rankings. However, Alabama rebounded by winning eight straight games, including victories against #14 LSU, #1 Mississippi State, and #15 Auburn in the Iron Bowl. They then defeated #14 Missouri in the SEC Championship 42–13 and earned a spot in the inaugural College Football Playoff, where they lost to the eventual national champion Ohio State 35–42.

=== Fourth national championship ===
Alabama started the 2015 season with a win against 20th ranked Wisconsin. Alabama would start 2–0 but would lose their next game against Ole Miss 43–37. Following the loss the Crimson Tide would go in to win the next twelve games including the 2015 Cotton Bowl Playoff Semifinal 38–0 over Michigan State and winning the 2016 College Football Playoff National Championship over undefeated Clemson 45–40 to claim Alabama's 16th National Championship and Saban's fourth national championship at the Capstone.

=== 2016 season ===
Alabama entered the 2016 season ranked #1 in the polls. The reigning national champions began 2016 with a resounding 52–6 win over #9 USC in Arlington, Texas, led by true freshman quarterback, Jalen Hurts. In what was the first meeting between the Tide and the Trojans since 1985, Blake Barnett started the game, but was soon replaced by Hurts, who would then go on to be the starting QB for the season. Hurts was the first true freshman QB to start for the Crimson Tide since 1984. For the first time since 2009, Alabama went undefeated all the way to the SEC Championship Game.

Alabama crushed Florida 54–16 to win their third consecutive SEC Title. This made the Tide the first three-peat SEC Champion since the Florida Gators won four in a row from 1993 to 1996. It also marked the first three peat for Alabama since the late 1970s when Alabama won SEC Championships from 1977 to 1979. The Tide would once again go on to the Playoffs where they would defeat the Washington Huskies 24–7 in the Peach Bowl to advance to their second consecutive College Football Playoff National Championship Game in Tampa, Florida.

In the first-ever national title game rematch, Alabama fell to Clemson, 35–31. In the closing seconds of the game, Clemson QB Deshaun Watson found Hunter Renfrow for a two-yard touchdown pass to give Clemson the win and their first national championship since 1981. The loss ended Alabama's 26 game winning streak, the second-longest in program history. It marked the first time Nick Saban had ever lost in a national championship game.

=== Fifth national championship ===
Alabama entered the 2017 season ranked No. 1 in the polls once again. The season began with the Tide defeating No. 3 Florida State 24–7 in the Chick Fila Kick off Game at Mercedes-Benz Stadium in Atlanta. Alabama would then go on to win their next ten games, heading into the Iron Bowl undefeated and still ranked number 1. However, the regular season was not without its issues. The Tide lost several key defensive players to injury throughout the season. There were some impressive blow outs, but also some very close games against Texas A&M, LSU, and Mississippi State.

With the SEC West on the line, the Tide fell to Auburn, 26–14 in a game that saw the worst performance by an Alabama team since the Mike Shula era. However, the season was not over for the Tide by a long shot. Auburn would go on to the SEC Championship Game, where they faced Georgia in a rematch from earlier in the season. The Bulldogs prevailed the second time around, crushing the Tigers 28–7 and leading to discussion of whether a similar situation to 2011 would take place. When the rankings were released, the playoff selection committee tapped both Alabama and Georgia for the playoffs. Alabama was selected to face Clemson in the Sugar Bowl Playoff Semifinal. In a rematch of the previous season's College Football Playoff National Championship Game, the Tide would prevail, blowing out Clemson 24–6.

Georgia's 54–48 overtime win over Oklahoma in the Rose Bowl Playoff semifinal set up an all-SEC National Championship Game where the Tide would win its 17th national championship by defeating Georgia 26–23 in overtime. With Alabama trailing 13–0 at halftime, a change was made at quarterback with freshman Tua Tagovailoa replacing a struggling Jalen Hurts. Tagovailoa went 14 of 24 passing for 166 yards and three touchdowns, including the game-winning touchdown pass to freshman wide receiver, DeVonta Smith in overtime. The 2017 national title was the sixth for head coach Nick Saban, and his fifth at the Capstone. This accomplishment tied coach Saban with iconic Alabama head coach, Paul W. Bryant, who also won six national titles in his storied career.

=== 2018 season ===
Alabama entered the 2018 season as the reigning national champions and ranked No. 1 in the nation once again. Alabama opened the season with a dominating win over Louisville, 51–14 in the Camping World Kickoff in Orlando, Florida. Tua Tagovailoa had won the starting QB job in the off season over two-year starter, Jalen Hurts. Tagovailoa turned in several stellar performances as Alabama rolled to their 2nd undefeated regular season in three years. Alabama scored 50-plus points in eight of their games.

Alabama set three records during the season. They became the first ever SEC team to score 50-plus points in three consecutive games. When Alabama shut out LSU 29–0 and Mississippi State 24–0, it marked the first time in history that an SEC team had shut out two consecutive conference opponents. Alabama become the first team since Yale in 1888 to outscore each of their first twelve opponents by 20 or more points. Alabama avenged their only loss of the 2017 season with a decisive 31 point win over arch rival Auburn, 52–21 in Tuscaloosa. Tagovailoa completed 25 of 32 passes and threw for 324 yards and five touchdowns in the Tide's Iron Bowl win. He had a TD himself, running one in early in the game, bringing the total to 6, an Iron Bowl record.

The following week, Alabama met Georgia in the 2018 SEC Championship Game, a rematch of the 2017 CFP National Championship Game. In a mirror image of the previous season's National Championship Game, Alabama's backup QB (this time Jalen Hurts) came in and engineered a dramatic comeback. Tagovailoa had been injured in the fourth quarter, and it was Hurts who led Alabama to a 35–28 victory. This was the school's 27th SEC Championship and it sent Alabama to the playoffs once again where they defeated the Oklahoma Sooners in the Orange Bowl Playoff Semifinal, 45–34.

The Cotton Bowl was the site of the other Playoff Semifinal, where Clemson defeated Notre Dame 30–3 to set up a fourth consecutive Alabama-Clemson meeting in the postseason. This time, Clemson won handily, routing Alabama 44–16 in the CFP National Championship Game in Santa Clara, California. It was the worst loss of the Saban era and the worst loss for the program since 2003, when LSU defeated Alabama 27–3.

=== 2019 season ===
Alabama entered the 2019 season as the reigning SEC Champions and ranked number 2 in the nation behind reigning national champion Clemson. Alabama opened the season with a blowout win over Duke, 42–3 in the 2019 Chick Fila Kickoff Game in Atlanta. The season saw its share of misfortune. While Alabama was undefeated going into their game vs LSU in November, the season ending injuries had piled up, mainly on an already young and inexperienced defense. It turned out to be the worst defense in Nick Saban's career. QB Tua Tagovailoa suffered a high ankle sprain against Tennessee that required surgery and put him out of action for weeks. Backup QB Mac Jones took over and Alabama won the game 35–13, but the game was closer than the final score indicated.

Jones played the entire game the following week vs. Arkansas as Bama rolled to a 48–7 win. Tagovailoa returned for the game against LSU which saw the Tigers prevail over Bama 46–41. It was LSU's first win over Alabama since the 2011 regular season meeting between the teams. Although Alabama battled back in the game, they never had the lead. They trailed by 3 touchdowns at halftime. It was also their first home loss since 2015. The following week saw even more misfortune. Tua Tagovailoa, still recovering from the injury in the Tennessee game, suffered a dislocated hip against Mississippi State, but unlike before, he would not play again. This thrust Mac Jones into the starting role for the remainder of the season.

Jones turned in a great performance the following week, albeit in a 66–3 win over FCS team, Western Carolina. Jones then had the task of playing in his first ever SEC road game against Auburn at Jordan Hare Stadium, a place where Alabama had not fared well in recent years. While Jones had a great game, Auburn would prevail 48–45. Despite going up against the number one defense in the nation, the Alabama backup QB went 26 of 39 and passed for 335 yards. Wide receiver Jaylen Waddle had 230 yards and 4 touchdowns, including a 98-yard kickoff return for a score. Alabama's inability to stop Auburn on offense and Jones' two interceptions returned for touchdowns proved impossible to overcome.

Alabama finished the 2019 regular season with a 10–2 record. It was first time since 2010 that the Tide lost two regular season games and the first time in the playoff era that they did not make the semifinals. Bama closed out 2019 with a 35–16 win over Michigan in the Citrus Bowl, finishing the season with an 11–2 record. This game marked the end of the 2010s decade for Alabama football. For the first time in program history, Alabama went the entirety of a decade with double digit wins in every year.

=== Sixth national championship ===
In a season that was under constant threat of cancellation due to the COVID-19 pandemic, Alabama began the year ranked number 2 in the nation. Like all other teams in the nation, Alabama's schedule had been drastically altered so as to play a revised season due to the pandemic. Gone off the schedule were USC, Georgia State, Kent State, and UT-Martin. All teams played within their own conferences until the postseason. Alabama opened the season on the last weekend of September by defeating Missouri 38–19 in Columbia. Next came a 52–24 win over Texas A&M in the home opener. It was the Aggies only loss of the 2020 season.

The season saw its share of disruptions due to COVID-19. Nick Saban tested positive before the game against Georgia on October 17. It was later deemed a false positive and he was able to coach the game, which saw Alabama defeat Georgia by a final score of 41–24. The following week, wide receiver Jaylen Waddle suffered an injury on the opening kickoff against Tennessee in Knoxville. It was to keep him out for the remainder of the season, although he did have successful surgery and did return in a limited role in the CFP national championship game against Ohio State. The game against LSU had to be postponed until December due to COVID-19 and thus the Tide had a long layoff during the regular season, going three weeks without playing.

Alabama returned to action by defeating Kentucky 63–3 and avenging the previous season's Iron Bowl loss by crushing Auburn 42–13 in Tuscaloosa. Coach Saban was unable to be at the game due to having tested positive for COVID-19 just a few days earlier. Unlike before, this was not a false positive. Offensive coordinator Steve Sarkisian was acting head coach in the win against their cross state rivals. The Tide would then avenge the 2019 loss to LSU by blowing them out 55–17 in Baton Rouge. It was the most points Alabama had ever scored against LSU and it was the second worse home loss for LSU in their history.

The regular season concluded with a 52–3 win against Arkansas in Fayetteville in another game that had been rescheduled. Alabama became the first team ever to win 10 SEC games in a single season. Next came the 2020 SEC Championship Game which saw the Tide win the 2020 SEC Title by defeating the Florida Gators in a high scoring affair, 52–46. Alabama would next meet Notre Dame in the Rose Bowl Playoff Semifinal defeating the Fighting Irish 31–14. The Ohio State Buckeyes defeated the heavily favored Clemson Tigers, 49–28 in the Sugar Bowl Playoff Semifinal to set up an Alabama- Ohio State CFP National Championship Game in Miami.

On January 5, 2021, wide receiver Devonta Smith won the Heisman Trophy, becoming the third winner of the award in school history. In what was the first meeting between the Tide and the Buckeyes since 2014, the inaugural year of the playoffs, the Tide rolled to a 52–24 win over the Buckeyes. The win gave the Tide its sixth national title under head coach Nick Saban and its 18th overall. It was an unprecedented seventh national title for coach Saban, giving him the most all time of any head coach, breaking the legendary Paul Bear Bryant's previous record of six.

=== 2021 season ===
Alabama began 2021 as the reigning national champions and once again, ranked number one in the nation. Bryce Young won the starting QB role in the offseason, and in the season opener, Alabama routed Miami, 44–13 in the 2021 Chick Fila Kickoff Game in Atlanta. The third game of the season saw the Tide struggle in a 31–29 win against Florida in Gainesville, after getting out to huge lead early on. Alabama's issues caught up with them in October as the Tide fell to Texas A&M, 41–38, in College Station. This was the first win for the Aggies over the Tide since 2012.

The remainder of the season was a rollercoaster. While Alabama would roll through the remainder of the regular season without a loss, the season was not without its woes. Shockingly close games against LSU and Auburn saw the Tide escape with narrow wins. In the first ever Iron Bowl to go to overtime, Alabama managed to escape against Auburn 24–22 in 4 overtimes at Jordan Hare Stadium. Bryce Young hit wide receiver John Metchie for the game winning two point play in the 4th overtime to lift the Tide to a win.

The following week, Alabama routed Georgia in the SEC Championship Game by the same score as the previous season, 41–24. It was the Tide's second consecutive SEC Championship and the win sent Alabama to the playoffs once again where they would defeat Cincinnati 27–6 in the Cotton Bowl Semifinal. Georgia defeated Michigan in the Orange Bowl Semifinal, setting up an Alabama-Georgia rematch in the CFP National Championship Game.

Georgia defeated Alabama the second time around, 33–18, giving the Bulldogs their first national championship since 1980. It marked Georgia's first win against the Tide since 2007 and it was Alabama's first loss to an SEC East team since 2010. Alabama finished 2021 with a record of 13–2. Also in 2021, Bryce Young won the Heisman Trophy, becoming Alabama's the second consecutive winner of the award, the fourth overall, and the first quarterback in Alabama history to win it.

=== 2022 season ===
Alabama began 2022 ranked number one in the nation. The season began with a 55–0 win over Utah State. It was Bama's first shutout win in a season opener since 1988 when the Tide defeated Temple 37–0. The following week was a road game against Texas in Austin. In what was the Tide and the Longhorns' first meeting since the BCS National Championship Game played after the 2009 season as well as Bama's first trip to Austin, TX in 100 years, Bama squeaked by with a 20–19 win. The Tide won convincingly in games against UL-Monroe, Vanderbilt, and Arkansas.

QB Bryce Young was seriously injured against Arkansas, and thus could not play in the following game against Texas A&M. Backup QB Jalen Milroe got the start. The Tide barely escaped with a 24–20 win against the Aggies in Tuscaloosa, narrowly avoiding a second consecutive shocking upset loss to them. The next week was the annual Third Saturday in October vs Tennessee. After falling behind early, Bama came back and took the lead, only to watch Tennessee come back late and tie the game. Bama had one final chance to get the win, but Will Reichard missed what would have been the game winning field goal. This enabled Tennessee time to put together one final drive to get into Tennessee place kicker Chase McGrath's range. McGrath hit a 40-yard field goal as time expired, giving Tennessee a 52–49 win over Alabama, the Vols' first since 2006 over the Tide, thus ending a 15-year Alabama win streak.

The Tide suffered its only other loss of the 2022 season in overtime, 32–31 against LSU in Baton Rouge. It was Alabama's first loss in Tiger Stadium since 2010. This solidified the SEC West title for LSU, and effectively knocked Bama out of the playoffs. After lackluster performances against Ole Miss and Austin Peay, the Tide would defeat their cross state rival, Auburn by a final of 49–27 in Tuscaloosa. The Tigers were being led by interim head coach, Carnell "Cadillac" Williams after the midseason dismissal of previous head coach Bryan Harsin. Bama was selected to go to the Sugar Bowl where they would meet Kansas State for the first time ever. The Tide concluded the 2022 season with a 45–20 win against the Wildcats. Alabama would finish 2022 11–2, having missed the playoffs for just the second time since the playoff format began.

=== Final season ===
Alabama began the 2023 season (which would turn out to be Coach Saban's final season) ranked number four in the nation. The season began with a 56–7 win over Middle Tennessee in Tuscaloosa. After the departure of Bryce Young, previous backup quarterback Jalen Milroe was now the starter and turned in a great performance in the season opening win. The next week saw the Tide lose at home to Texas, 34–24. It was the Longhorns' first trip to Tuscaloosa since 1902. The 10-point loss marked the only time that Nick Saban lost at Bryant Denny Stadium by double digits during his tenure at Alabama.

2023 also marked the last season that Texas played in the Big 12 as they, along with Oklahoma joined the SEC. The shaky performance by Milroe lead to a quarterback change the following week at South Florida. Coach Saban rotated quarterbacks Ty Simpson and Tyler Buchner in a very sloppy 17–3 win over the Bulls. The following week saw the return of starter Jalen Milroe as Alabama cruised past Ole Miss in Tuscaloosa, 24–10. The Tide did not lose again in the regular season, going undefeated in the SEC and avenging the two losses from the previous season to Tennessee and LSU.

The regular season finale saw the Tide pull off a last minute win over archrival Auburn, 27–24. Just as the 2021 trip to Jordan Hare stadium, Alabama played very subpar and needed a last minute drive for the win over a heavy underdog Auburn team. Jalen Milroe found receiver Isiah Bond on a 4th and goal play from the Auburn 31 yard line. The win marked the first time that Alabama had won 4 in a row over the Tigers since their 9-game win streak in the series from 1973 to 1981. Next up was the SEC Championship Game against back to back reigning national champion Georgia. The Bulldogs were undefeated, ranked number one in the nation, and vying for an unprecedented third consecutive national title.

That was not realized for Georgia, as Alabama won, 27–24, giving the program its 30th SEC title. It was the first loss for Georgia since the 2021 SEC Championship Game, when Alabama defeated Georgia 41–24, and it ended Georgia's record 29 game win streak. The win secured a spot for the Tide in the College Football Playoffs. In a Rose Bowl semifinal against Michigan, Alabama would fall 27–20 in overtime. After leading 20–13 late in the game, Michigan quarterback JJ McCarthy found receiver Roman Wilson for a 4-yard touchdown reception to tie the game at 20–20. The game went into overtime where Michigan would take the lead. In an attempt to win or possibly tie the game to go to a second overtime, quarterback Jalen Milroe was stopped on a 4th and goal quarterback sneak to give Michigan the victory.

It marked the first semifinal loss for Alabama since the 2014 season (the first year of the playoffs) when Alabama lost to Ohio State. 2023 also marked the end of the 4-team playoff format, as an expanded, 12 team format (to include first round on campus games along with quarterfinals) began in 2024. Bama finished with a record of 12–2. The 2023 season was the third consecutive year without a national championship, which was the only time in the entire Nick Saban era that this occurred. It marked the first time since 2007 that the Tide was not ranked #1 at some point in the season. At the end of the season, Coach Saban announced his retirement from coaching, bringing to an end a truly historic time in college football history.

== Rivalries ==
=== Auburn ===
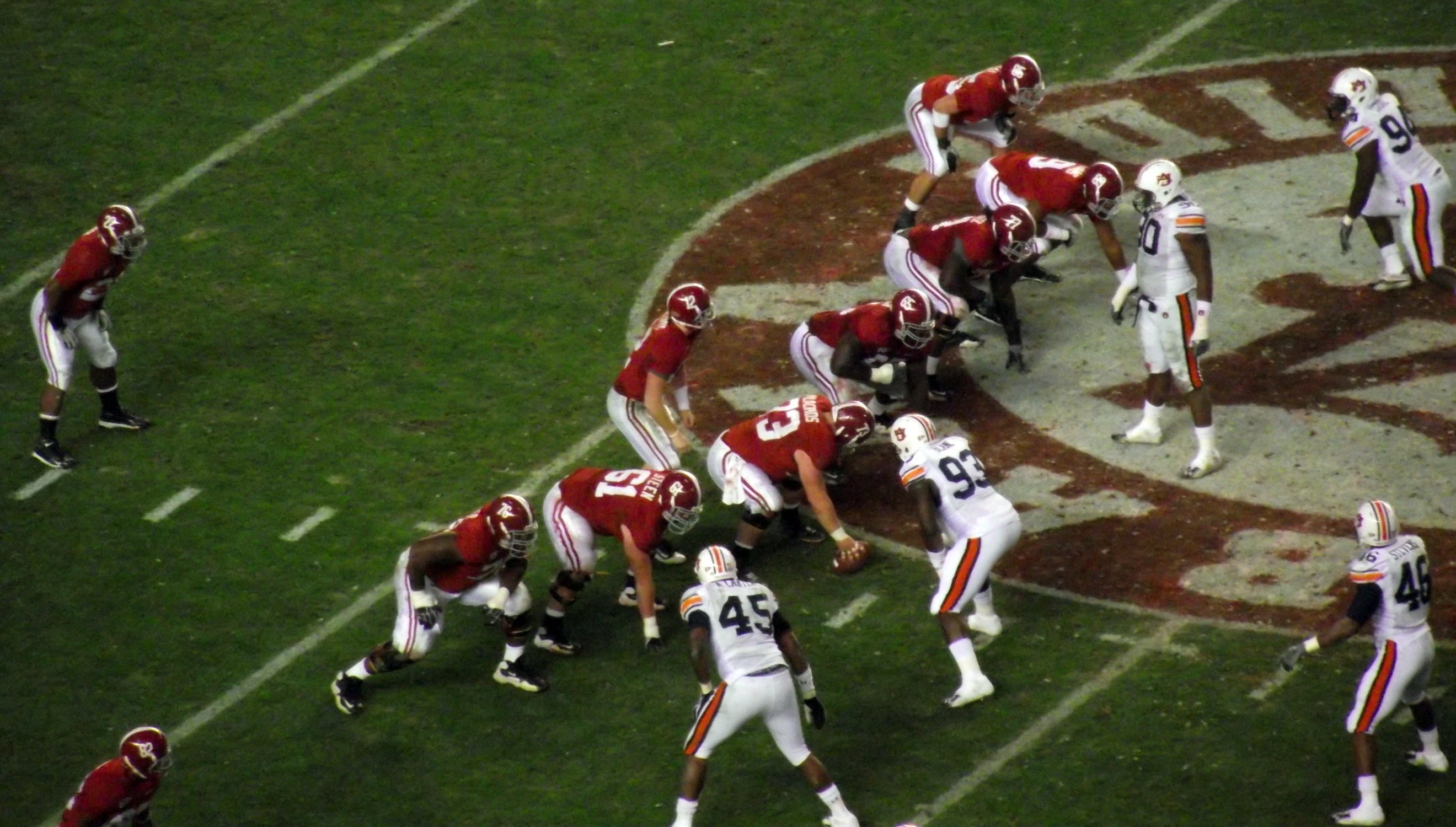
Alabama on offense against the Tigers in 2010

The main rivalry of the Crimson Tide is against its in-state rival, Auburn University Tigers; considered one of the top sporting rivalries in the US. The Alabama-Auburn annual game has come to be known as the Iron Bowl. The outcome of the game generally determines "bragging rights" in the state of Alabama until the following contest. The game may also have implications as to which team will represent the SEC Western Division in the SEC Championship Game.

On February 22, 1893, at Lakeview Park in Birmingham, Auburn was victorious in the first ever Iron Bowl, 32–22. The series was suspended after the 1907 contest, due to violence and financial complications. In 1944, Auburn suggested to reopen the series, though the board of trustees at Alabama rejected. The series was resumed in 1948, with Alabama crushing the Tigers 55–0, which is still the largest margin of victory in the series. In the following contest, Auburn shocked Alabama with a 14–13 victory, which is credited with helping revive the series.

For many years, the contest was held at Legion Field in Birmingham, before the teams began alternating between Bryant-Denny Stadium, in Tuscaloosa, and Jordan–Hare Stadium, in Auburn. In Saban's final game against Auburn, Alabama won 27–24 in Auburn, leaving the series record at 50–37–1 by his retirement..

=== Tennessee ===
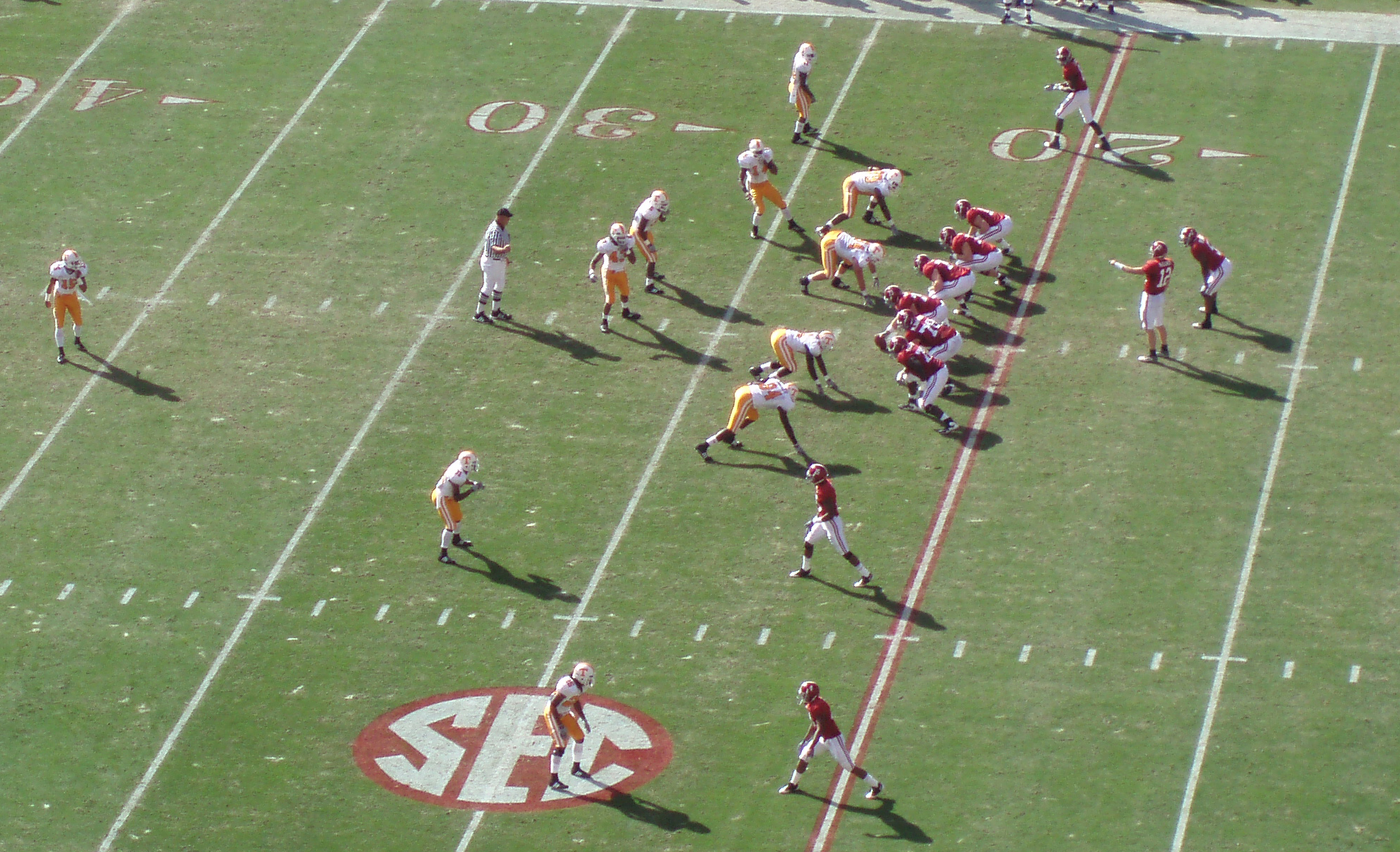
Alabama on offense versus Tennessee in Tuscaloosa during the 2009 season

Despite the heated in-state rivalry with Auburn, Bear Bryant was more adamant about defeating his rivals to the north, the Tennessee Volunteers. The series is named the Third Saturday in October, the traditional calendar date on which the game was played. Despite the name, the game has been played on the third Saturday only five times between 1995 and 2007. The first game between the two sides was played in 1901 in Birmingham, ending in a 6–6 tie.

From 1902 to 1913, Alabama dominated the series, losing only once, and never allowing a touchdown by the Volunteers. Beginning in 1928, the rivalry was first played on its traditional date and began to be a challenge for the Crimson Tide as Robert Neyland began challenging Alabama for their perennial spot on top of the conference standings. In the 1950s, Jim Goostree, the head trainer for Alabama, began another tradition as he began handing out cigars following a victory over the Volunteers.

Between 1971 and 1981, Alabama held an 11-game winning streak over the Volunteers and, between 1986 and 1994, a nine-game unbeaten streak. However, following Alabama's streak, Tennessee responded with a seven-game winning streak from 1995 to 2001. Alabama holds the longest winning streak at 15 from 2007 to 2021. In Saban's final game against Tennessee, Alabama won 34–20 in Tuscaloosa, leaving the series record at 59–39–7 by his retirement..

=== LSU ===
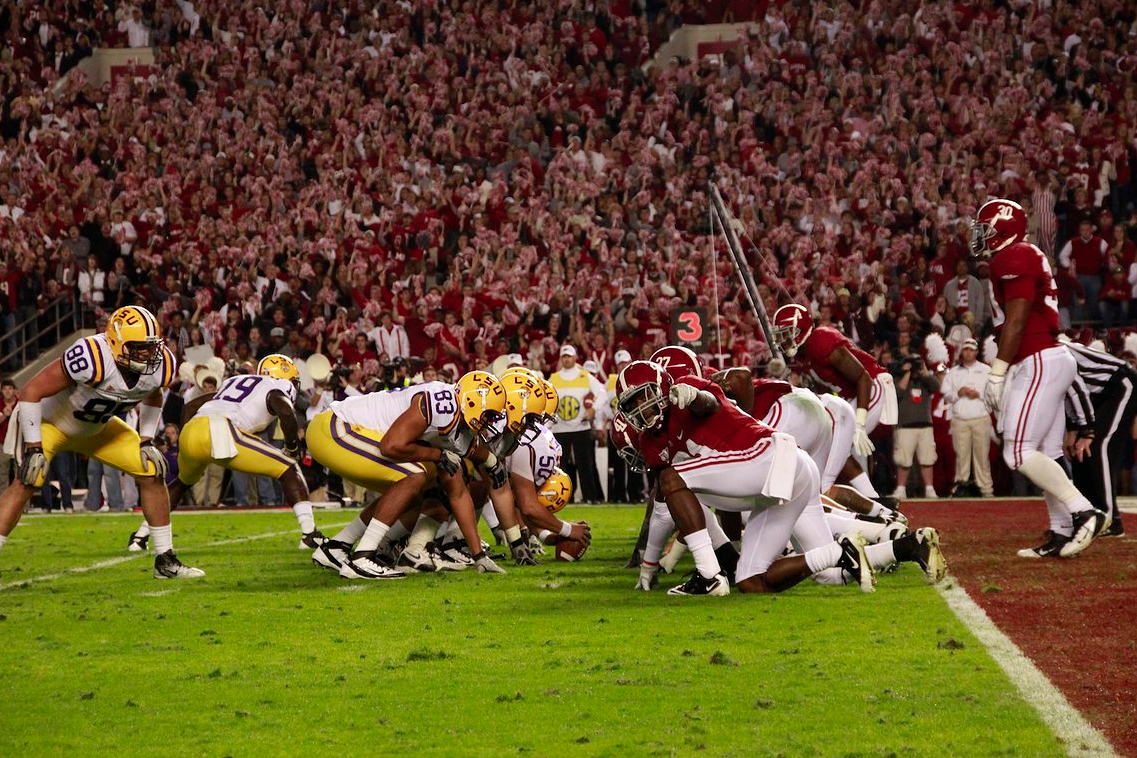
Alabama vs. LSU 2011

A rivalry within the SEC Western Division occurs yearly between Alabama and the LSU Tigers. Starting in 1895, the Tigers were victorious 12–6 in the first meeting. The teams did not regularly meet until the mid-1960s during Alabama's dominance of the SEC. Between 1971 and 1981, the Crimson Tide won 11 consecutive times. In the 1969 game, LSU defeated Alabama 20–15 in Baton Rouge. Alabama did not lose again in Baton Rouge until 2000.

In 2007, the meeting was more heated following Alabama's hiring of head coach Nick Saban, who previously coached at LSU. With the hiring, many media outlets dubbed the 2007 meeting as the "Saban Bowl". The Crimson Tide lost the first "Saban Bowl" in 2007, won the 2008 and 2009 meetings only to lose in Baton Rouge in 2010.

In 2011, the teams played as the consensus No. 1 and No. 2 ranked teams in the polls with LSU winning 9–6 in overtime. They played each other again for the BCS National Championship with Alabama winning 21–0 to secure its 14th National Championship. In Saban's final game against LSU, Alabama won 42–28 in Tuscaloosa, leaving the series record at 56–27–5 by his retirement..

=== Mississippi State ===
Alabama's most-played rival is Mississippi State. The rivalry has been called the "Battle for Highway 82", with the schools being only 90 miles apart. Many cite the 2014 meeting as the biggest game in the series where Alabama faced a #1 ranked, 10–0 Mississippi State team with Dak Prescott as its quarterback. Alabama won 25–20, which helped catapult them into the first College Football Playoff. In Saban's final game against Mississippi State, Alabama won 40–17 in Starkville, leaving the series record at 86–18–3 by his retirement..

=== Clemson ===
The series dates back to 1900 but the rivalry has intensified in recent years, with the last four meetings having national championship implications. Alabama lead the series 14–5 by his retirement.

=== Florida ===
Alabama has a rivalry with the Florida Gators, which was largely developed with the start of the SEC Championship Game. Alabama and Florida have met in 10 SEC Title Games (Alabama leads 6–4 in Title games), including the first 3 from 1992 to 1994. In Saban's final game against Florida, Alabama won 31–29 in Gainsville, leaving the series record at 28–14 by his retirement. (27–14 with the Alabama 2005 win vacated).

=== Georgia ===
Alabama has a traditional rivalry with the Georgia Bulldogs, especially from the 1920s through 1965 and as well as in recent years under Nick Saban. This rivalry intensified as Saban's former defensive coordinator at Alabama, Kirby Smart became head coach at Georgia in 2015, igniting a rivalry between the two former colleagues.

During Saban's tenure, Alabama went 8–2 against Georgia, including victories in all 4 SEC Titles Games in which they met (2012, 2018, 2021, and 2023) while defeating Smart's Bulldogs in the 2018 National Championship but losing to them in 2022. In Saban's final game against Georgia, Alabama won 27–24 in the 2023 SEC Championship, leaving the series record at 43–26–4 by his retirement.

=== Former rivalries ===
The Georgia Tech Yellow Jackets were at one time considered an Alabama rival. During the suspension of the Iron Bowl between 1907 and 1948, Georgia Tech (then a member of the SEC) emerged as one of the most intense games on Alabama's schedule. The teams played many significant games, especially in the late 1950s and early 1960s. A heated feud developed between Bear Bryant and Georgia Tech head coach Bobby Dodd following a controversial hit in the 1961 game, a 10–0 Alabama victory. Dodd cited this feud as the primary impetus for Georgia Tech leaving the SEC three years later. The two teams have met 52 times, making Georgia Tech Alabama's most played among current non-conference opponents. Alabama leads the series 28–21–3; Georgia Tech won the last meeting in 1984. Alabama's fight song, "Yea Alabama", mentions Georgia Tech with the line "Send the Yellow Jackets to a watery grave."

There have been many historic games between Alabama and Penn State. The two teams met five times during the tenure of Bear Bryant, including in the 1979 Sugar Bowl, which determined the national championship for the 1978 season. The games usually have national implications—seven of the 15 meetings between the two schools have featured both teams ranked in the top ten—and eight of the meetings have been decided by a touchdown or less. The most recent game was in 2011, with Alabama winning 27–11. It was the final loss for long-time Penn State head coach Joe Paterno. Alabama leads the series 10–5.

== Head coaching record ==
Year	Team	Overall	Conference	Standing	Bowl/playoffs	Coaches^{#}	AP^{°}
2007	Alabama	7–6	4–4	T–3rd (Western)	W Independence		
2008	Alabama	12–2	8–0	1st (Western)	L Sugar^{†}	6	6
2009	Alabama	14–0	8–0	1st (Western)	W BCS NCG^{†}	1	1
2010	Alabama	10–3	5–3	4th (Western)	W Capital One	11	10
2011	Alabama	12–1	7–1	2nd (Western)	W BCS NCG^{†}	1	1
2012	Alabama	13–1	7–1	1st (Western)	W BCS NCG^{†}	1	1
2013	Alabama	11–2	7–1	T–1st (Western)	L Sugar^{†}	8	7
2014	Alabama	12–2	7–1	1st (Western)	L Sugar^{†}	4	4
2015	Alabama	14–1	7–1	1st (Western)	W Cotton^{†}, W CFP NCG^{†}	1	1
2016	Alabama	14–1	8–0	1st (Western)	W Peach^{†}, L CFP NCG^{†}	2	2
2017	Alabama	13–1	7–1	T–1st (Western)	W Sugar^{†}, W CFP NCG^{†}	1	1
2018	Alabama	14–1	8–0	1st (Western)	W Orange^{†}, L CFP NCG^{†}	2	2
2019	Alabama	11–2	6–2	2nd (Western)	W Citrus	8	8
2020	Alabama	13–0	10–0	1st (Western)	W Rose^{†}, W CFP NCG^{†}	1	1
2021	Alabama	13–2	7–1	1st (Western)	W Cotton^{†}, L CFP NCG^{†}	2	2
2022	Alabama	11–2	6–2	T–1st (Western)	W Sugar^{†}	5	5
2023	Alabama	12–2	8–0	1st (Western)	L Rose^{†}	5	5
Alabama:		206–29	120–18				
Total:							
National championship Conference title Conference division title or championship game berth
^{†}Indicates Bowl Coalition, Bowl Alliance, BCS, or CFP / New Years' Six bowl.; ^{#}Rankings from final Coaches Poll.

== First-team All-Americans ==
Year	Player name	Position	Selector(s)
2008	Antoine Caldwell†	Center	AFCA, AP, TSN, SI
2008	Terrence Cody†	Defensive tackle	AFCA, AP, FWAA, TSN, SI, Rivals.com, CBS
2008	Rashad Johnson	Safety	AFCA, Rivals.com
2008	Andre Smith‡	Offensive tackle	AFCA, AP, FWAA, TSN, WC, ESPN, FN, SI, CBS, Rivals.com
2009	Javier Arenas†	Cornerback	AFCA, AP, SI
2009	Javier Arenas	Punt returner	CBS, Rivals.com
2009	Terrence Cody†	Defensive tackle	AP, FWAA, WC, CBS
2009	Mark Ingram II‡	Running back	AP, FWAA, AFCA, WC, TSN, SI, ESPN, CBS, Rivals.com
2009	Mike Johnson†	Offensive guard	AP, AFCA, WC, TSN, SI, ESPN, CBS, Rivals.com
2009	Rolando McClain‡	Linebacker	AP, FWAA, AFCA, WC, TSN, SI, ESPN, CBS, Rivals.com
2009	Leigh Tiffin	Placekicker	AP, CBS
2010	Mark Barron	Safety	FWAA
2011	Mark Barron‡	Safety	AFCA, AP, FWAA, WC, TSN, CBS, ESPN, PFW, Scout.com, SI
2011	Dont'a Hightower†	Linebacker	AFCA, AP, WC, PFW
2011	Barrett Jones‡	Tackle	AP, AFCA, FWAA, WC, CBS, ESPN, Scout.com, TSN
2011	Dre Kirkpatrick	Cornerback	FWAA, CBS, PFW
2011	DeQuan Menzie	Cornerback	AFCA
2011	Trent Richardson‡	Running back	AP, AFCA, FWAA, WCFF, CBS, ESPN, Scout.com, TSN
2011	Courtney Upshaw	Linebacker	FWAA, TSN, CBS, ESPN, PFW, Scout.com, SI
2012	D. J. Fluker	Offensive tackle	CBS, Scout.com
2012	Barrett Jones†	Center	WCFF, AP, FWAA, TSN, CBS, Scout.com, ESPN, SI
2012	Dee Milliner‡	Cornerback	WCFF, AFCA, AP, FWAA, TSN, CBS, Scout.com, ESPN, PFW
2012	C. J. Mosley†	Linebacker	WCFF, AFCA, AP, TSN, CBS, Scout.com, SI
2012	Chance Warmack‡	Offensive guard	WCFF, AFCA, AP, TSN, FWAA, CBS, Scout.com, ESPN, SI, PFW
2013	Ha Ha Clinton-Dix†	Safety	AFCA, FWAA, TSN, ESPN
2013	Cyrus Kouandjio†	Offensive tackle	AFCA, FWAA, WCFF, AP, CBS, Athlon
2013	A. J. McCarron	Quarterback	AFCA, WCFF
2013	C. J. Mosley‡	Linebacker	AFCA, FWAA, TSN, WCFF, AP, USAT, CBS, ESPN, Athlon
2014	Landon Collins‡	Safety	AP, WCFF, TSN, AFCA, FWAA, CBS, ESPN, Scout, SI
2014	Amari Cooper‡	Wide receiver	AP, WCFF, TSN, AFCA, FWAA, USAT, CBS, ESPN, Scout, SI
2014	Trey DePriest	Linebacker	AFCA
2014	Arie Kouandjio	Offensive Guard	AFCA, USAT, SI
2014	J. K. Scott	Punter	TSN, USAT, ESPN, SI
2015	Derrick Henry‡	Running back	AP, WCFF, FWAA, AFCA, TSN, USAT, CBS, SI, ESPN, FOX
2015	Reggie Ragland‡	Linebacker	AP, WCFF, FWAA, AFCA, TSN, USAT, CBS, SI, ESPN
2015	Ryan Kelly†	Center	WCFF, FWAA, AFCA, TSN, USAT, ESPN
2015	A'Shawn Robinson†	Defensive tackle	AP, FWAA, AFCA, TSN, CBS, SI, FOX
2016	Jonathan Allen‡	Defensive end	AFCA, FWAA, AP, WCFF, TSN, SI, USAT, ESPN, FOX, CBS
2016	Reuben Foster‡	Linebacker	AFCA, FWAA, AP, WCFF, TSN, SI, USAT, ESPN, FOX, CBS
2016	Cam Robinson‡	Offensive tackle	AFCA, FWAA, AP, WCFF, TSN, SI, ESPN, FOX, CBS, Athlon
2016	Minkah Fitzpatrick†	Defensive back	AFCA, AP, ESPN
2016	Marlon Humphrey	Defensive back	FWAA
2016	O. J. Howard	Tight end	FOX
2017	Minkah Fitzpatrick‡	Defensive back	AP, AFCA, FWAA, WCFF, TSN, SI, USAT, ESPN, CBS, CFN, Athlon
2017	Rashaan Evans	Linebacker	AFCA
2017	J. K. Scott	Punter	CFN
2018	Tua Tagovailoa†	Quarterback	AFCA, TSN, WCFF, Athlon
2018	Jerry Jeudy†	Wide receiver	AFCA, AP, TSN, WCFF, SI, ESPN, CBS, Athlon
2018	Jonah Williams‡	Offensive tackle	AFCA, AP, FWAA, TSN, WCFF, SI, USAT, CFN, ESPN, CBS, Athlon
2018	Ross Pierschbacher	Center	TSN
2018	Quinnen Williams‡	Defensive tackle	AFCA, AP, FWAA, TSN, WCFF, SI, USAT, CFN, ESPN, CBS, Athlon
2018	Deionte Thompson†	Safety	AFCA, AP, TSN, SI, USAT, CFN, ESPN, CBS, Athlon
2019	Jerry Jeudy	Wide receiver	AFCA
2019	Alex Leatherwood	Offensive tackle	AFCA
2019	Jedrick Wills	Offensive tackle	Athletic, CBS, USAT
2019	Xavier McKinney	Safety	Athletic, CBS, USAT
2019	Jaylen Waddle	Kick returner	CBS, FWAA, SI, TSN, USAT
2020	Christian Barmore	Defensive tackle	CBS
2020	Landon Dickerson ‡	Center	AFCA, AP, CBS, ESPN, FWAA, Phil Steele, TSN, WCFF
2020	Mac Jones †	Quarterback	AFCA, AP, Athletic, ESPN, TSN, USAT, WCFF
2020	Najee Harris ‡	Running back	AFCA, AP, CBS, ESPN, FWAA, Phil Steele, TSN, WCFF
2020	Alex Leatherwood ‡	Offensive tackle	AFCA, AP, Athletic, CBS, ESPN, FWAA, Phil Steele, TSN, USAT, WCFF
2020	Dylan Moses	Linebacker	AFCA
2020	Will Reichard	Placekicker	CBS
2020	DeVonta Smith ‡	Wide receiver	AFCA, AP, Athletic, CBS, ESPN, FWAA, Phil Steele, TSN, USAT, WCFF
2020	DeVonta Smith	Return Specialist	CBS
2020	Patrick Surtain II ‡	Cornerback	AFCA, AP, Athletic, CBS, ESPN, FWAA, Phil Steele, TSN, USAT, WCFF
2020	Thomas Fletcher	Long snapper	Phil Steele
2021	Will Anderson Jr. ‡	Linebacker	Athletic, CBS, ESPN, FWAA, USAT, WCFF
2021	Evan Neal ‡	Offensive tackle	CBS, ESPN, FWAA, USAT, WCFF
2021	Jameson Williams	Wide receiver	CBS, ESPN, USAT
2021	Bryce Young †	Quarterback	Athletic, CBS, ESPN, FWAA, USAT
2022	Will Anderson Jr. †	Linebacker	AP, Athletic, ESPN, CBS, FWAA, TSN, USAT, WCFF
2022	Brian Branch	Safety	ESPN, CBS
2023	Dallas Turner †	Linebacker	AP, AFCA, FWAA, TSN, Athlon Sports, ESPN, CBS, The Athletic, USAT, Phil Steele
2023	Kool-Aid McKinstry†	Cornerback	AP, TSN, CBS, Athlon Sports, PFF, USAT, SI
2023	Terrion Arnold	Defensive back	AP, ESPN
2023	Caleb Downs	Safety	PFF
2023	James Burnip	Punter	PFF

† Consensus selection
‡ Unanimous selection

== NFL draftees ==
Year	Round	Pick	Overall	Player name	Position	NFL team	Notes
2009	1	6	6	Andre Smith	Offensive tackle	Cincinnati Bengals	—
2009	3	10	74	Glen Coffee	Running back	San Francisco 49ers	—
2009	3	13	77	Antoine Caldwell	Center	Houston Texans	—
2009	3	31	95	Rashad Johnson	Defensive back	Arizona Cardinals	—
2010	1	8	8	Rolando McClain	Linebacker	Oakland Raiders	—
2010	1	20	20	Kareem Jackson	Cornerback	Houston Texans	—
2010	2	18	50	Javier Arenas	Defensive back	Kansas City Chiefs	—
2010	2	25	57	Terrence Cody	Defensive end	Baltimore Ravens	Super Bowl Champion (XLVII)
2010	3	34	98	Mike Johnson	Offensive guard	Atlanta Falcons	—
2010	7	4	211	Marquis Johnson	Defensive back	St. Louis Rams	—
2010	7	40	247	Brandon Deaderick	Defensive end	New England Patriots	—
2011	1	3	3	Marcell Dareus	Defensive tackle	Buffalo Bills	2× Pro Bowl (2013, 2014), First-team All-Pro (2014)
2011	1	6	6	Julio Jones	Wide receiver	Atlanta Falcons	7x Pro Bowl (2012, 2014, 2015, 2016, 2017, 2018, 2019), 2x First-team All-Pro (2015, 2016), 3x Second-team All-Pro (2017, 2018, 2019)
2011	1	25	25	James Carpenter	Offensive tackle	Seattle Seahawks	Super Bowl Champion (XLVIII)
2011	1	28	28	Mark Ingram II	Running back	New Orleans Saints	3x Pro Bowl (2014, 2017, 2019)
2011	7	5	208	Greg McElroy	Quarterback	New York Jets	—
2012	1	3	3	Trent Richardson	Running back	Cleveland Browns	—
2012	1	7	7	Mark Barron	Safety	Tampa Bay Buccaneers	—
2012	1	17	17	Dre Kirkpatrick	Cornerback	Cincinnati Bengals	—
2012	1	25	25	Dont'a Hightower	Linebacker	New England Patriots	3x Super Bowl Champion (XLIX, LI, LIII), 2x Pro Bowl (2016, 2019), Second-team All-Pro (2016)
2012	2	3	35	Courtney Upshaw	Linebacker	Baltimore Ravens	Super Bowl Champion (XLVII)
2012	5	1	136	Josh Chapman	Defensive tackle	Indianapolis Colts	—
2012	5	11	146	DeQuan Menzie	Cornerback	Kansas City Chiefs	—
2012	7	40	247	Brad Smelley	Tight end	Cleveland Browns	—
2013	1	9	9	Dee Milliner	Cornerback	New York Jets	—
2013	1	10	10	Chance Warmack	Guard	Tennessee Titans	Super Bowl Champion (LII)
2013	1	11	11	D. J. Fluker	Offensive tackle	San Diego Chargers	—
2013	2	29	61	Eddie Lacy	Running back	Green Bay Packers	Pro Bowl (2013), Second-team All-Pro (2013)
2013	4	2	99	Nico Johnson	Linebacker	Kansas City Chiefs	—
2013	4	16	113	Barrett Jones	Center	St. Louis Rams	—
2013	5	4	137	Jesse Williams	Defensive tackle	Seattle Seahawks	Super Bowl Champion (XLVIII)
2013	5	24	157	Quinton Dial	Defensive end	San Francisco 49ers	—
2013	7	5	211	Michael Williams	Tight end	Detroit Lions	Super Bowl Champion (LI)
2014	1	17	17	C. J. Mosley	Linebacker	Baltimore Ravens	5x Pro Bowl (2014, 2016, 2017, 2018, 2022), 5x Second-team All-Pro (2014, 2016, 2017, 2018, 2022)
2014	1	21	21	Ha Ha Clinton-Dix	Safety	Green Bay Packers	Pro Bowl (2016), Second-team All-Pro (2016)
2014	2	12	44	Cyrus Kouandjio	Offensive tackle	Buffalo Bills	—
2014	4	23	123	Kevin Norwood	Wide receiver	Seattle Seahawks	—
2014	5	20	160	Ed Stinson	Defensive end	Arizona Cardinals	—
2014	5	24	164	A. J. McCarron	Quarterback	Cincinnati Bengals	—
2014	5	27	167	Vinnie Sunseri	Safety	New Orleans Saints	—
2014	6	1	177	Jeoffrey Pagan	Defensive end	Houston Texans	—
2015	1	4	4	Amari Cooper	Wide receiver	Oakland Raiders	5x Pro Bowl (2015, 2016, 2018, 2019, 2023)
2015	2	1	33	Landon Collins	Safety	New York Giants	3x Pro Bowl (2016, 2017, 2018), First-team All-Pro (2016)
2015	2	4	36	T. J. Yeldon	Running back	Jacksonville Jaguars	—
2015	4	9	108	Jalston Fowler	Fullback	Tennessee Titans	—
2015	4	13	112	Arie Kouandjio	Guard	Washington Redskins	—
2015	7	11	228	Austin Shepherd	Offensive tackle	Minnesota Vikings	—
2015	7	36	253	Xzavier Dickson	Linebacker	New England Patriots	—
2016	1	18	18	Ryan Kelly	Center	Indianapolis Colts	3x Pro Bowl (2019, 2020, 2021), All-Pro (2020)
2016	2	10	41	Reggie Ragland	Linebacker	Buffalo Bills	Super Bowl Champion (LIV)
2016	2	14	45	Derrick Henry	Running back	Tennessee Titans	5x Pro Bowl (2019, 2020, 2022, 2023, 2024), 2x First-team All-Pro (2020, 2022), 2x Second-Team All-Pro (2019, 2024), AP Offensive Player of the Year (2020)
2016	2	15	46	A'Shawn Robinson	Defensive tackle	Detroit Lions	Super Bowl Champion (LVI)
2016	2	18	49	Jarran Reed	Defensive tackle	Seattle Seahawks	Super Bowl Champion (LX)
2016	2	29	60	Cyrus Jones	Cornerback	New England Patriots	Super Bowl Champion (LI)
2016	3	10	73	Kenyan Drake	Running back	Miami Dolphins	—
2017	1	16	16	Marlon Humphrey	Cornerback	Baltimore Ravens	4x Pro Bowl (2019, 2020, 2022, 2024), 2x First-team All-Pro (2019, 2024)
2017	1	17	17	Jonathan Allen	Defensive end	Washington Redskins	2x Pro Bowl (2021, 2022)
2017	1	19	19	O.J. Howard	Tight end	Tampa Bay Buccaneers	Super Bowl Champion (LV)
2017	1	31	31	Reuben Foster	Linebacker	San Francisco 49ers	—
2017	2	2	34	Cam Robinson	Offensive tackle	Jacksonville Jaguars	—
2017	2	17	49	Ryan Anderson	Linebacker	Washington Redskins	—
2017	2	23	55	Dalvin Tomlinson	Defensive tackle	New York Giants	—
2017	3	14	78	Tim Williams	Linebacker	Baltimore Ravens	—
2017	3	15	79	ArDarius Stewart	Wide receiver	New York Jets	—
2017	4	5	121	Eddie Jackson	Safety	Chicago Bears	2x Pro Bowl (2018, 2019), First-team All-Pro (2018)
2018	1	11	11	Minkah Fitzpatrick	Safety	Miami Dolphins	5x Pro Bowl (2019, 2020, 2022, 2023, 2024), 3x First-team All-Pro (2019, 2020, 2022)
2018	1	13	13	Daron Payne	Nose tackle	Washington Redskins	—
2018	1	22	22	Rashaan Evans	Linebacker	Tennessee Titans	—
2018	1	26	26	Calvin Ridley	Wide receiver	Atlanta Falcons	Second-team All-Pro (2020)
2018	3	29	93	Ronnie Harrison	Safety	Jacksonville Jaguars	—
2018	4	14	114	Da'Shawn Hand	Defensive end	Detroit Lions	—
2018	4	18	118	Anthony Averett	Cornerback	Baltimore Ravens	—
2018	5	35	172	J. K. Scott	Punter	Green Bay Packers	—
2018	6	23	197	Shaun Dion Hamilton	Linebacker	Washington Redskins	—
2018	6	41	215	Bradley Bozeman	Center	Baltimore Ravens	—
2018	7	18	236	Bo Scarbrough	Running back	Dallas Cowboys	—
2018	7	28	246	Joshua Frazier	Defensive tackle	Pittsburgh Steelers	—
2019	1	3	3	Quinnen Williams	Defensive tackle	New York Jets	4x Pro Bowl (2022, 2023, 2024, 2025), First-team All-Pro (2022)
2019	1	11	11	Jonah Williams	Offensive tackle	Cincinnati Bengals	—
2019	1	24	24	Josh Jacobs	Running back	Oakland Raiders	3x Pro Bowl (2020, 2022, 2024), First-team All-Pro (2022)
2019	2	18	50	Irv Smith Jr.	Tight end	Minnesota Vikings	—
2019	3	24	87	Damien Harris	Running back	New England Patriots	—
2019	4	13	115	Christian Miller	Linebacker	Carolina Panthers	—
2019	5	1	139	Deionte Thompson	Safety	Arizona Cardinals	—
2019	5	15	153	Ross Pierschbacher	Center	Washington Redskins	—
2019	5	17	155	Mack Wilson	Linebacker	Cleveland Browns	—
2019	6	20	192	Isaiah Buggs	Defensive tackle	Pittsburgh Steelers	—
2020	1	5	5	Tua Tagovailoa	Quarterback	Miami Dolphins	Pro Bowl (2023)
2020	1	10	10	Jedrick Wills	Offensive tackle	Cleveland Browns	—
2020	1	12	12	Henry Ruggs III	Wide receiver	Las Vegas Raiders	—
2020	1	15	15	Jerry Jeudy	Wide receiver	Denver Broncos	Pro Bowl (2024)
2020	2	4	36	Xavier McKinney	Safety	New York Giants	Pro Bowl (2024), First-team All-Pro (2024), Second-team All Pro (2025)
2020	2	19	51	Trevon Diggs	Cornerback	Dallas Cowboys	2x Pro Bowl (2021, 2022), First-team All-Pro (2021)
2020	2	24	56	Raekwon Davis	Defensive tackle	Miami Dolphins	—
2020	3	20	84	Terrell Lewis	Linebacker	Los Angeles Rams	Super Bowl Champion (LVI)
2020	3	25	87	Anfernee Jennings	Linebacker	New England Patriots	—
2021	1	6	6	Jaylen Waddle	Wide receiver	Miami Dolphins	—
2021	1	9	9	Patrick Surtain II	Cornerback	Denver Broncos	4x Pro Bowl (2022, 2023, 2024, 2025), 2x First-team All-Pro (2022, 2024), Second-team All Pro (2025), AP Defensive Player of the Year (2024)
2021	1	10	10	DeVonta Smith	Wide receiver	Philadelphia Eagles	Super Bowl Champion (LIX)
2021	1	15	15	Mac Jones	Quarterback	New England Patriots	Pro Bowl (2021)
2021	1	17	17	Alex Leatherwood	Offensive tackle	Las Vegas Raiders	—
2021	1	24	24	Najee Harris	Running back	Pittsburgh Steelers	Pro Bowl (2021)
2021	2	5	37	Landon Dickerson	Center	Philadelphia Eagles	2x Pro Bowl (2023, 2024), First-team All-Pro (2024), Super Bowl Champion (LIX)
2021	2	6	38	Christian Barmore	Defensive tackle	New England Patriots	—
2021	6	9	193	Deonte Brown	Offensive guard	Carolina Panthers	—
2021	6	38	222	Thomas Fletcher	Long snapper	Carolina Panthers	—
2022	1	7	7	Evan Neal	Offensive tackle	New York Giants	—
2022	1	12	12	Jameson Williams	Wide receiver	Detroit Lions	—
2022	2	12	44	John Metchie III	Wide receiver	Houston Texans	—
2022	2	15	47	Phidarian Mathis	Defensive tackle	Washington Commanders	—
2022	3	11	75	Christian Harris	Linebacker	Houston Texans	—
2022	3	34	98	Brian Robinson Jr.	Running back	Washington Commanders	—
2022	4	14	119	Jalyn Armour-Davis	Cornerback	Baltimore Ravens	—
2023	1	1	1	Bryce Young	Quarterback	Carolina Panthers	—
2023	1	3	3	Will Anderson Jr.	Linebacker	Houston Texans	Pro Bowl (2025), First-team All-Pro (2025)
2023	1	9	9	Jahmyr Gibbs	Running back	Detroit Lions	2x Pro Bowl (2024, 2025)
2023	2	14	45	Brian Branch	Cornerback	Detroit Lions	Pro Bowl (2024), First-team All-Pro (2024)
2023	3	2	65	Tyler Steen	Offensive tackle	Philadelphia Eagles	Super Bowl Champion (LIX)
2023	3	7	70	Byron Young	Defensive tackle	Las Vegas Raiders	—
2023	3	32	95	Jordan Battle	Safety	Cincinnati Bengals	—
2023	3	38	101	Cameron Latu	Tight end	San Francisco 49ers	—
2023	5	32	167	Henry To'oTo'o	Linebacker	Houston Texans	—
2023	7	7	224	DeMarcco Hellams	Safety	Atlanta Falcons	—
2024	1	7	7	JC Latham	Offensive tackle	Tennessee Titans	—
2024	1	17	17	Dallas Turner	Defensive end	Minnesota Vikings	—
2024	1	24	24	Terrion Arnold	Cornerback	Detroit Lions	—
2024	2	9	41	Kool-Aid McKinstry	Cornerback	New Orleans Saints	—
2024	2	25	57	Chris Braswell	Defensive end	Tampa Bay Buccaneers	—
2024	3	16	80	Jermaine Burton	Wide receiver	Cincinnati Bengals	—
2024	4	5	105	Justin Eboigbe	Defensive tackle	Los Angeles Chargers	—
2024	6	10	186	Jase McClellan	Running back	Atlanta Falcons	—
2024	6	27	203	Will Reichard	Kicker	Minnesota Vikings	First-team All-Pro (2025)
2024	7	37	257	Jaylen Key	Safety	New York Jets	—

== All-time assistant coaches ==
Coach	Position	Alma mater	Years served
Major Applewhite	Offensive coordinator	Texas	2007
Brian Baker	Associate head coach/defensive line	Maryland	2019–Present
Jeff Banks	Special Teams/tight ends	Washington State	2018–Present
Greg Brown	Secondary	UTEP	2013
Burton Burns	Running backs	Nebraska	2007–present
Curt Cignetti	Wide receivers	West Virginia	2007–2010
Mario Cristobal	Offensive line	Miami	2013–2016
Bo Davis	Defensive line	LSU	2007–2010
Brian Daboll	Offensive coordinator	Rochester	2017–2018
Dan Enos	Quarterbacks	Michigan State	2018
Kyle Flood	Offensive line	Iona Gaels football	2019–Present
Josh Gattis	Wide receivers	Wake Forest	2018
Pete Golding	Defensive coordinator	Delta State	2018–Present
Mike Groh	Wide receivers	Virginia	2011–2012
Charles Huff	Running backs	Hampton	2019–Present
Brent Key	Offensive line/special teams	Georgia Tech	2016–2018
Charles Kelly	Associate DC/safeties	Auburn	2019–Present
Lane Kiffin	Offensive coordinator	Fresno State	2014–2016
Craig Kuligowski	Defensive line	Toledo	2018
Mike Locksley	Offensive coordinator	Towson	2018
Tosh Lupoi	Defensive coordinator	California	2018
Jim McElwain	Offensive coordinator	Eastern Washington	2008–2011
Billy Napier	Wide receivers	Furman	2013–2016
Doug Nussmeier	Offensive coordinator	Idaho	2012–2013
Bill O'Brien	Offensive coordinator/quarterbacks	Brown	2021–Present
Joe Pannunzio	Secondary	Southern Colorado	2017–2018
Joe Pendry	Offensive line	West Virginia	2007–2010
Jeremy Pruitt	Secondary Defensive coordinator	West Alabama	2010–2012, 2016–2017
Chris Rumph	Defensive line	South Carolina	2011–2014
Tommy Rees	Offensive coordinator/quarterbacks	Notre Dame	2023
Steve Sarkisian	Offensive coordinator/quarterbacks	BYU	2017, 2019–2020
Karl Scott	Secondary	McMurry University	2018–Present
Kirby Smart	Defensive coordinator	Georgia	2007–2015
Kevin Steele	Defensive line	Tennessee	2007–2008, 2023
Jeff Stoutland	Offensive line	Southern Connecticut	2011–2012
Sal Sunseri	Linebackers	Pittsburgh	2009–2011, 2019–Present
Lance Thompson	Linebackers	The Citadel	2007–2008; 2012–2014
Holmon Wiggins	Wide receivers	New Mexico State	2019–Present
Bobby Williams	Tight ends Special teams	Purdue	2008–2015
James Willis	Linebackers	Auburn	2009

== Bryant–Denny Stadium ==
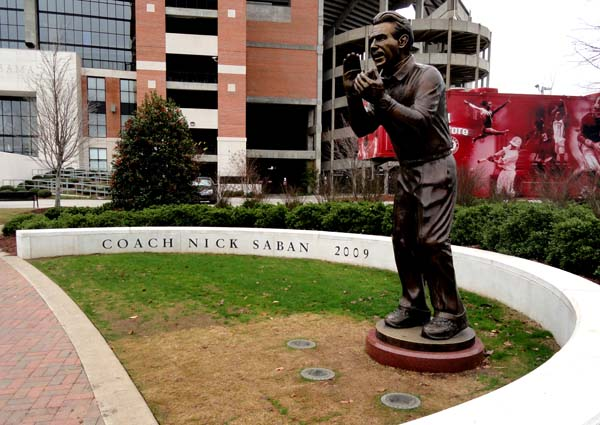
Nick Saban statue located at the Walk of Champions outside Bryant–Denny Stadium.

During Saban's tenure as head coach of the Crimson Tide, Alabama has played all home games on-campus at Bryant–Denny Stadium. Prior to the 2006 season, the north endzone expansion brought the total seating capacity of Bryant–Denny to 92,138, the seventh largest stadium in college football. After Saban became head coach, in February 2009, the University of Alabama System Board of Trustees unanimously approved a proposal to expand the south endzone with an upper deck that seated approximately 9,000 spectators and added 36 luxury boxes. The expansion was budgeted at $80.6 million and Davis Architects of Birmingham, Alabama served as the architect of record for the project. The expansion was completed just prior to the start of the 2010 season on August 20 and increased Bryant–Denny's capacity to 101,821, the fifth largest in college football.

Outside the stadium on its northern side is the Walk of Champions. This areas pays tribute to past championship teams at Alabama in addition to featuring bronze statues of all five head coaches who won national championships with the Crimson Tide. After he led them to the 2009 national championship, athletics director Mal Moore indicated that a statue of Saban would be erected in the Walk of Champions just as the previous four coaches. The nine-foot statue was designed by Alabama student Jeremy Davis and fabricated by MTM Recognition of Oklahoma City, Oklahoma. It was officially unveiled prior to the 2011 A-Day spring game on April 16, 2011, and has since been updated to include subsequent championships.
