= Kouandjio =

Kouandjio is a surname. Notable people with the surname include:

- Arie Kouandjio (born 1992), American football player
- Cyrus Kouandjio (born 1993), American football player
