= Cyrus Kouandjio =

Cameroonian player of American football (born 1993)

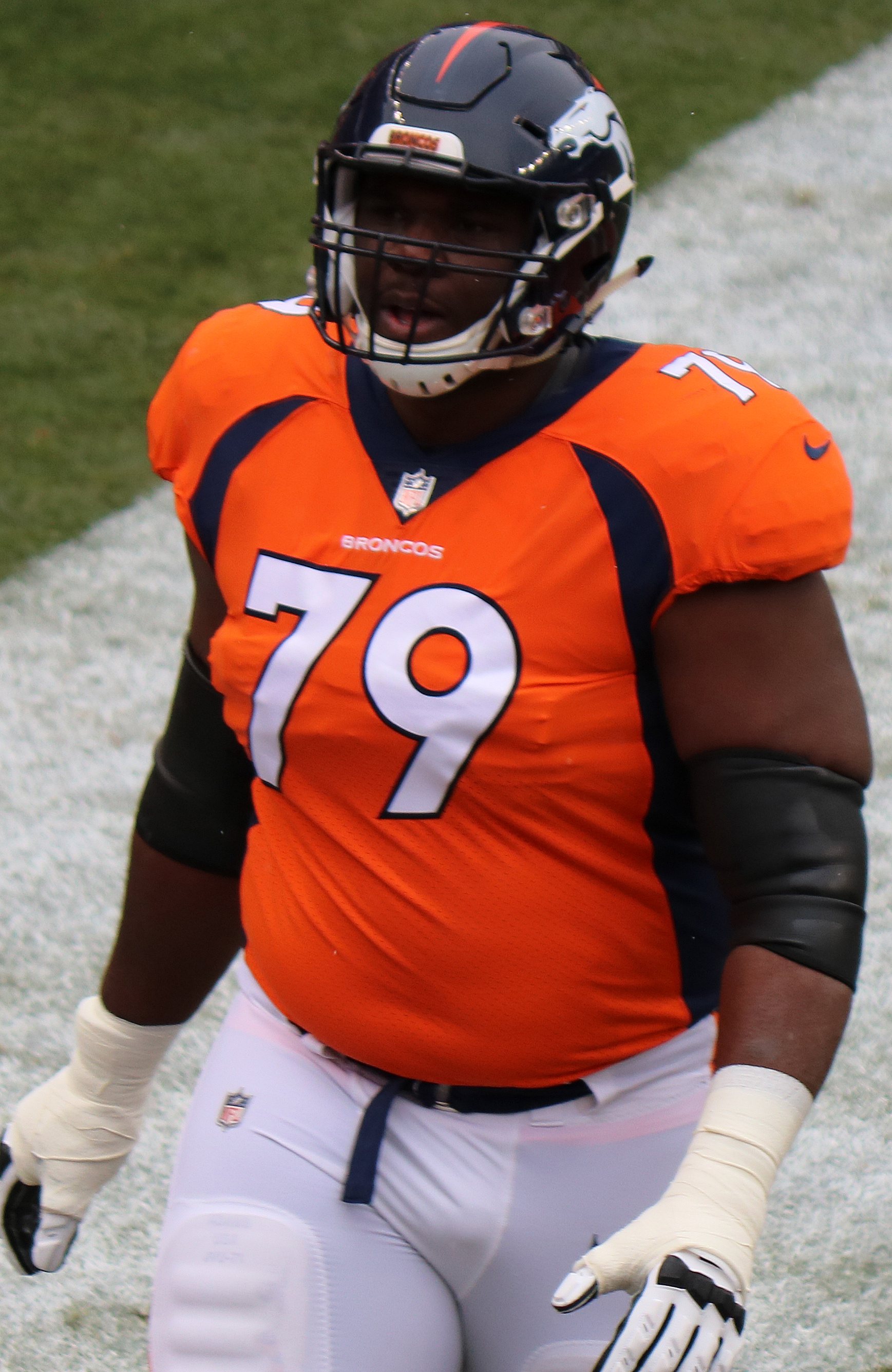
- Kouandjio with the Denver Broncos in 2017

No. 71, 79
- Position: Offensive tackle

Personal information
- Born: July 21, 1993 (age 33); Douala, Cameroon
- Listed height: 6 ft 7 in (2.01 m)
- Listed weight: 320 lb (145 kg)

Career information
- High school: DeMatha Catholic (Hyattsville, Maryland, U.S.)
- College: Alabama (2011–2013)
- NFL draft: 2014: 2nd round, 44th overall pick

Career history
- Buffalo Bills (2014–2016); Detroit Lions (2017)*; Denver Broncos (2017–2018); New York Guardians (2020); Saskatchewan Roughriders (2020–2021)*
- * Offseason or practice squad member only

Awards and highlights
- 2× BCS national champion (2012, 2013); Consensus All-American (2013); First-team All-SEC (2013)

Career NFL statistics
- Games played: 30
- Games started: 8
- Stats at Pro Football Reference

Cyrus Berenice Kouandjio (/ˈkwɑːndʒoʊ/ KWAHN-joh) (born July 21, 1993) is a Cameroonian former professional player of American football who was an offensive tackle in the National Football League (NFL). He played college football for the Alabama Crimson Tide, earning consensus All-American honors in 2013. He was selected by the Buffalo Bills in the second round of the 2014 NFL draft.

== Early life ==
Kouandjio initially attended High Point High School in Beltsville, Maryland, where he played football for the Eagles program. After his freshman year he was recruited by and transferred to DeMatha Catholic High School in Hyattsville, Maryland with his older brother Arie, where he played football for the Stags program. He competed in the 2011 Under Armour All-America Game. Kouandjio, a five-star and consensus top offensive line prospect in the nation by Rivals.com, ESPN, Scout.com, and SuperPrep, received offers from over sixty schools, including: Alabama, Auburn, New Mexico, USC, and Iowa. He was the fourth-ranked prospect in the recruiting class of 2011.

On National Signing Day, Kouandjio announced on ESPNU that he would attend Auburn University. Later that day, it was reported that he had second thoughts about his choice and was still undecided. Three days later, on February 5, 2011, Kouandjio's brother Arie announced on his Twitter account that Cyrus would attend the University of Alabama.

== College career ==
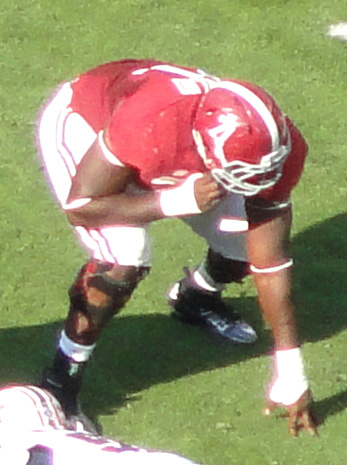
Kouandjio with Alabama in 2012

In 2011, Kouandjio contributed as a true freshman, playing in eight games until a knee injury in the second half against Tennessee ended his season.

As a sophomore in 2012, Kouandjio started all 14 games at the left tackle position. He had the fewest career starts on the Alabama offensive line in the 2012 season. In the 2013 BCS National Championship Game against Notre Dame, Alabama repeatedly ran to the left behind Kouandjio, contributing to 265 net yards rushing and 5.9 yards per rush. On Alabama's third drive, Kouandjio pancake blocked Notre Dame defensive end Sheldon Day. Kouandjio ended the 2012 season ranked as the top offensive tackle from the 2011 recruiting class.

As a junior in 2013, Kouandjio was a first-team All-Southeastern Conference (SEC) selection. After the season, he decided to forego his senior season and entered the 2014 NFL draft.

== Professional career ==
=== Pre-draft ===
As early as April 2013, Kouandjio was projected as one of the top selections in the 2014 NFL draft.

Pre-draft measurables
Height	Weight	Arm length	Hand span	Wingspan	40-yard dash	10-yard split	20-yard split	20-yard shuttle	Three-cone drill	Vertical jump	Broad jump	Bench press
6 ft 6 3/4 in (2.00 m)	322 lb (146 kg)	35 5/8 in (0.90 m)	10 1/4 in (0.26 m)	7 ft 3 1/4 in (2.22 m)	5.46 s	1.91 s	3.13 s	4.84 s	7.71 s	31.0 in (0.79 m)	8 ft 10 in (2.69 m)	22 reps
All values from NFL Combine/Pro Day

=== Buffalo Bills ===
Kouanjio was selected by the Buffalo Bills in the second round of the 2014 NFL draft. He became the fifth Alabama offensive lineman selected in the first two rounds in six years, after Andre Smith, James Carpenter, Chance Warmack, and D. J. Fluker.

Kouandjio suffered an ankle injury near the start of the 2016 season, causing him to miss multiple weeks. He went on to play 12 games with five starts in 2016.

On January 26, 2017, Kouandijo suffered a hip injury after falling in his home and underwent surgery. He was expected to recover in time for training camp. On May 24, 2017, Kouandijo was released by the Bills.

=== Detroit Lions ===
On June 15, 2017, Kouandijo signed with the Detroit Lions. He was released on August 29, 2017.

=== Denver Broncos ===
On November 8, 2017 Kouandjio was signed by the Denver Broncos. He played in three games, starting one at right tackle in 2017.

On September 1, 2018, Kouandjio was released by the Broncos. He was re-signed on November 20, 2018. He was released again on December 4, 2018.

=== New York Guardians ===
Kouandjio was selected by the New York Guardians of the XFL in the 2nd round in phase two in the 2020 XFL draft.

=== Saskatchewan Roughriders ===
On March 23, 2020, Kouandjio signed with the Saskatchewan Roughriders of the Canadian Football League. He retired from football on July 20, 2021.

== Personal life ==
Kouandjio's older brother, Arie, played offensive guard at Alabama and for the Washington Redskins. Cyrus is married to his college girlfriend, Elizabeth Van Zandt who was also an athlete at the University of Alabama. On April 20, 2017, Kouandjio was found undressed by deputies and firefighters in Elma, New York. Kouandjio required medical attention for an undisclosed condition, and was granted first-aid. Kouandjio formally turned himself in, avoiding his arrest.
