= Chance Warmack =

American football player (born 1991)

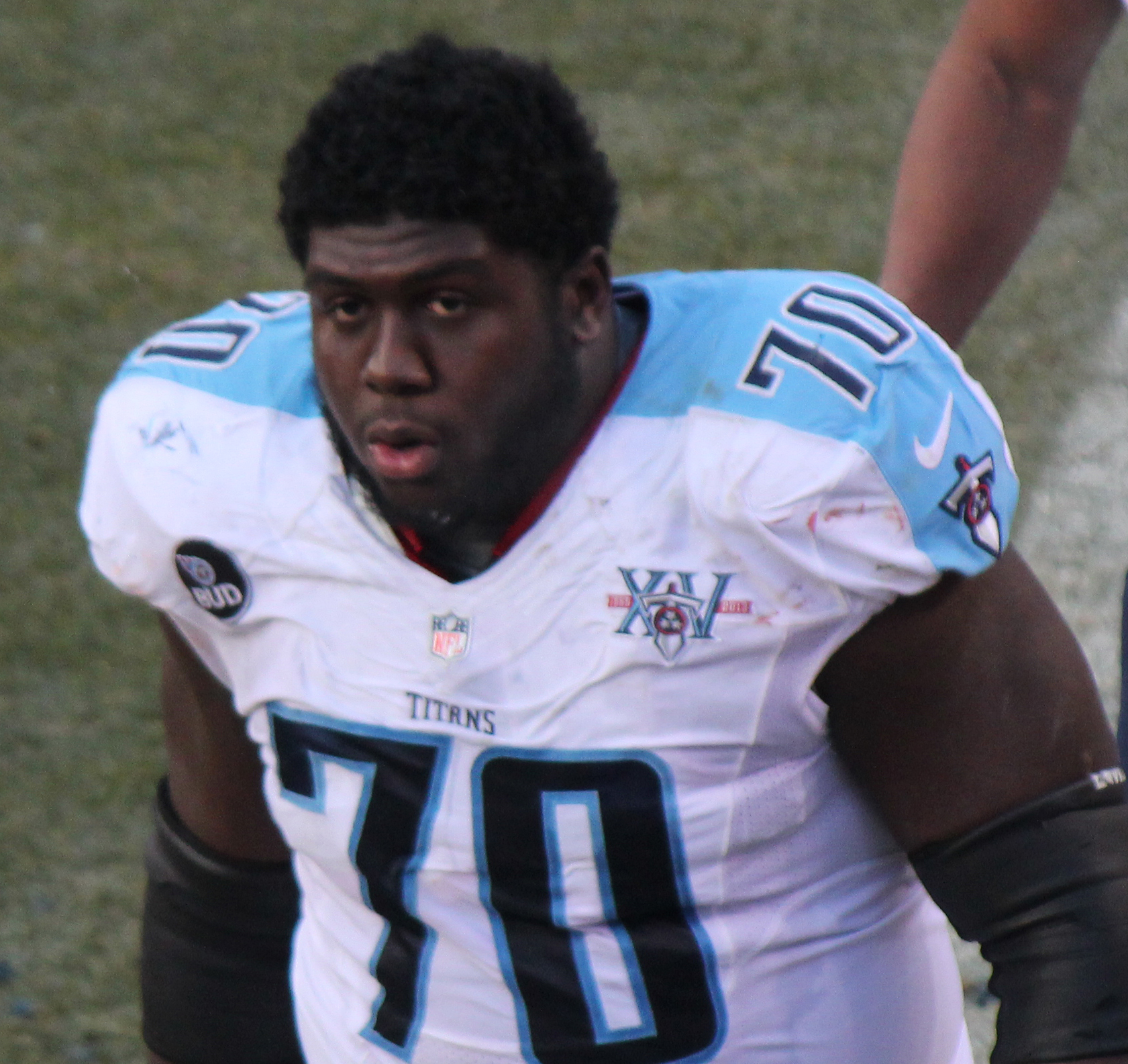
- Warmack with the Tennessee Titans in 2013

No. 70, 67
- Position: Guard

Personal information
- Born: September 14, 1991 (age 35); Detroit, Michigan, U.S.
- Listed height: 6 ft 2 in (1.88 m)
- Listed weight: 323 lb (147 kg)

Career information
- High school: Westlake (Atlanta, Georgia)
- College: Alabama (2009–2012)
- NFL draft: 2013: 1st round, 10th overall pick

Career history
- Tennessee Titans (2013–2016); Philadelphia Eagles (2017–2018); Seattle Seahawks (2020)

Awards and highlights
- Super Bowl champion (LII); 3× BCS national champion (2009, 2011, 2012); Unanimous All-American (2012); First-team All-SEC (2012); Second-team All-SEC (2011)

Career NFL statistics
- Games played: 68
- Games started: 51
- Stats at Pro Football Reference

Chance Warmack (born September 14, 1991) is an American former professional football player who was a guard in the National Football League (NFL). He was selected by the Tennessee Titans tenth overall in the 2013 NFL draft. He played college football for the Alabama Crimson Tide, where he was a three time national champion and earned unanimous All-American honors during his senior year.

Warmack spent his first four seasons in the NFL with Titans. He was a starter for his first three seasons before missing most of the 2016 season due to injury. He then signed with the Philadelphia Eagles in 2017, playing with the team for two seasons as a backup and winning Super Bowl LII. After not playing for any team in 2019, Warmack signed with the Seattle Seahawks in 2020 but opted out of the season due to the COVID-19 pandemic.

== Early life ==
Warmack attended Westlake High School in Atlanta, Georgia, where he was an all-state offensive lineman. For his freshman and sophomore year, he was teammates with quarterback Cam Newton. During his senior year, Warmack was credited with an average of seven pancake blocks per game. Westlake finished the season 6–5 with a first-round playoff loss to Douglasville – Chapel Hill High School. Warmack earned a Georgia Top 150 selection by the Atlanta Journal-Constitution, and Tom Lemming listed him as an All-American in his Prep Football Report.

Considered a three-star recruit by Rivals.com, Warmack was listed as the No. 20 offensive guard in the nation in 2009. He chose Alabama over offers from Arkansas, Rutgers, Auburn, and South Carolina.

== College career ==
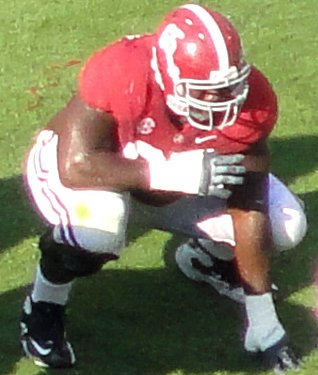
Warmack with Alabama in 2012

Warmack graduated early from high school and enrolled in the University of Alabama in January 2009, and played for coach Nick Saban's Alabama Crimson Tide football team from 2009 to 2012. After participating in spring football practice, he served as a backup to Barrett Jones and played in 5 games as a true freshman. As a sophomore, Warmack replaced All-American Mike Johnson in the starting lineup and opened all 13 contests at left guard.

As a junior in 2011, he started 13 more games and helped Alabama win the 2012 BCS National Championship Game over Louisiana State, while earning 2nd team All-SEC honors. After weighing his options to enter the 2012 NFL draft, Warmack decided to return to Alabama for his final year of eligibility. Prior to his senior season, he received numerous individual accolades, being on multiple preseason award watch lists and being named to Sports Illustrated's preseason All-American team.

Warmack started all 13 games for the Crimson Tide as a senior in 2012, on his way to winning his third national championship title in four years. He graduated in December 2012 with a degree in communication studies.

== Professional career ==
=== Pre-draft ===
Pre-draft measurables
Height	Weight	Arm length	Hand span	Wingspan	40-yard dash	10-yard split	20-yard split	20-yard shuttle	Three-cone drill	Broad jump
6 ft 2 in (1.88 m)	317 lb (144 kg)	34 3/4 in (0.88 m)	9 5/8 in (0.24 m)	6 ft 9 1/8 in (2.06 m)	5.49 s	1.90 s	3.17 s	5.01 s	7.93 s	9 ft 2 in (2.79 m)
All values from NFL Combine/Pro Day

Warmack was considered the best interior linemen available in the 2013 NFL draft. ESPN draft analyst Todd McShay considered Warmack the best guard prospect he's seen since Steve Hutchinson, who went 17th overall to the Seattle Seahawks in the 2001 NFL draft. NFL Network analyst and NBC commentator Mike Mayock considered him the best football player in the draft. Not since Chris Naeole in 1997 had a guard been selected in the top-10 of an NFL draft, but Warmack was considered to have a chance.

=== Tennessee Titans ===
Warmack was selected in the first round as the 10th overall pick by the Tennessee Titans in the 2013 NFL draft, becoming the second guard picked in the draft, behind Jonathan Cooper. Cooper and Warmack became the first guards to be selected in the top-10 of the same draft since Dave Cadigan and Eric Moore in 1988.

Despite playing left guard in college, he was moved to right guard with the Titans. During his rookie year in 2013, he started all sixteen games for the Titans, who finished with a 7–9 record. Pro Football Focus gave him positive grades for four games in the season.

In 2014, Warmack remained the starting right guard, starting all sixteen games in the season. The Titans finished with a league-worst 2–14 record. Despite this, Pro Football Focus rated him positively in six consecutive games beginning with the Week 11 game against the Pittsburgh Steelers. His plus-12.8 PFF rating from Weeks 11–15 was second in the league only to the Philadelphia Eagles' Evan Mathis.

Warmack started all sixteen games for the Titans in 2015, who finished with another league-worst record of 3–13.

On May 2, 2016, the Titans declined the fifth-year option on Warmack's contract. Warmack started the first two games of the season. After the Titans' Week 2 win against the Detroit Lions, Warmack was placed on injured reserve with a hand injury on September 21, 2016. Josh Kline started as right guard for the rest of the season and the Titans finished with a 9–7 record.

=== Philadelphia Eagles ===
On March 9, 2017, Warmack was signed a one-year, $1.51 million deal with the Philadelphia Eagles. On September 2, 2017, he signed a one-year contract extension with the Eagles through the 2018 season. In 2017, he played in 11 games, starting three at left guard. The Eagles finished first in the division with a 13–3 record. Warmack won Super Bowl LII when the Eagles defeated the New England Patriots 41–33. In the Super Bowl, he played four snaps at guard and another two for special teams plays.

In the 2018 season, he played in nine games, starting none. The Eagles finished with a 9–7 record, qualifying for the playoffs finishing second in the division, winning the Wild Card game against the Chicago Bears and losing the Divisional round against the New Orleans Saints. Warmack played in both postseason games.

=== Seattle Seahawks ===
After a year away from football, Warmack signed a one-year contract with the Seattle Seahawks on March 30, 2020. On August 1, 2020, he opted out of the 2020 season due to the COVID-19 pandemic. He was released after the season on February 8, 2021.

== Personal life ==
Warmack has a younger brother, Dallas Warmack, who also played offensive guard for the University of Alabama, but transferred to the University of Oregon after the 2017 season.
