= Arie Kouandjio =

Cameroonian player of American football (born 1992)

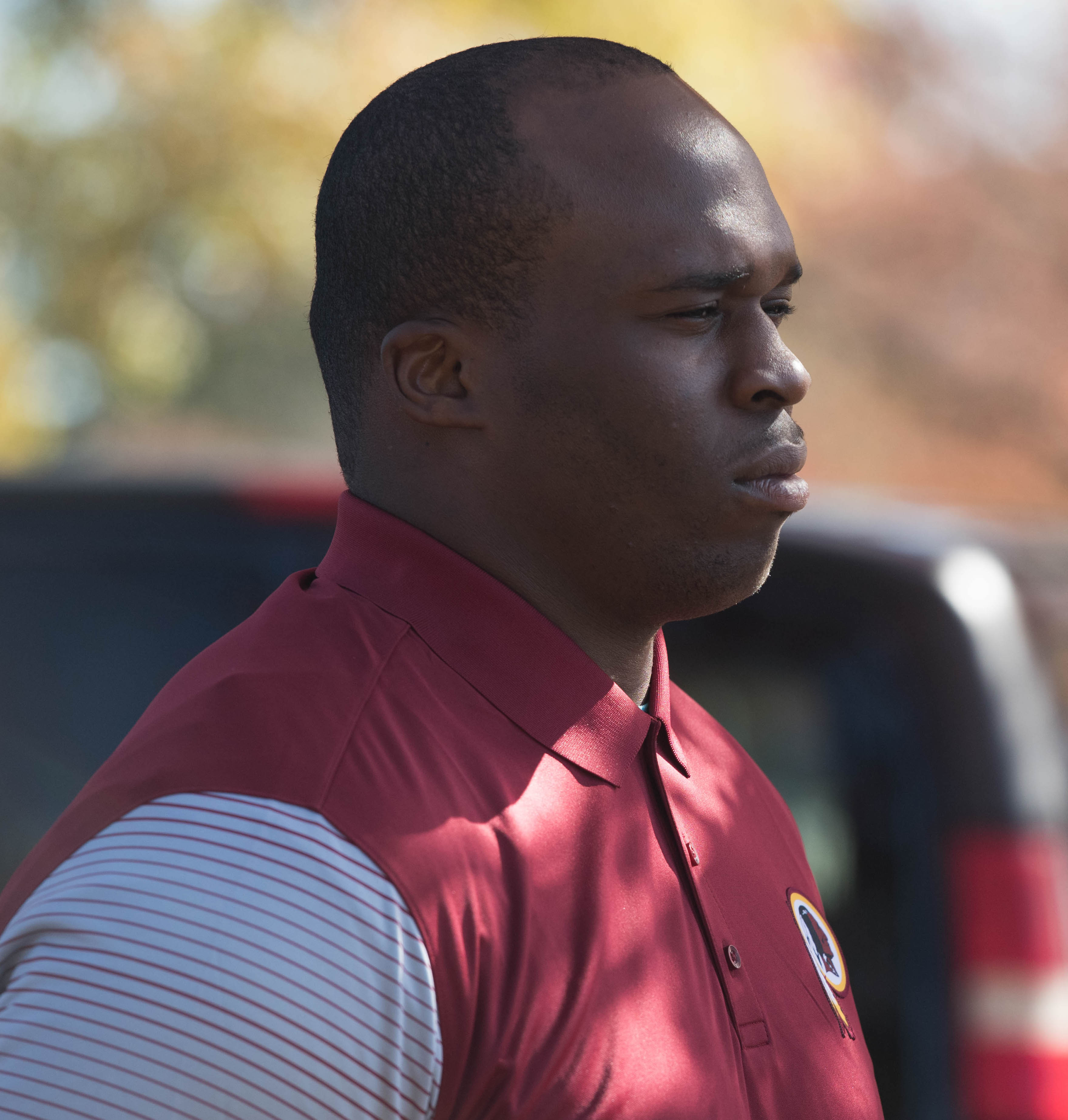
- Kouandjio with the Washington Redskins in 2016

No. 74, 60
- Position: Offensive guard

Personal information
- Born: April 23, 1992 (age 34); Douala, Cameroon
- Listed height: 6 ft 5 in (1.96 m)
- Listed weight: 316 lb (143 kg)

Career information
- High school: DeMatha Catholic (Hyattsville, Maryland, U.S.)
- College: Alabama (2010–2014)
- NFL draft: 2015: 4th round, 112th overall pick

Career history
- Washington Redskins (2015–2016); Baltimore Ravens (2017)*; Washington Redskins (2017–2018); New York Guardians (2020)
- * Offseason or practice squad member only

Awards and highlights
- 2× BCS national champion (2011, 2012); Second-team All-American (2014); First-team All-SEC (2014)

Career NFL statistics
- Games played: 16
- Games started: 8
- Stats at Pro Football Reference

Arie-Manuel Kouandjio (born April 23, 1992) is a Cameroonian former professional player of American football who was a guard in the National Football League (NFL). He played college football for the Alabama Crimson Tide, and was selected by the Washington Redskins in the fourth round of the 2015 NFL draft.

== Early life ==
Georgette and Jean-Claude Kouandjio, Arie's mother and father, immigrated to the United States from Cameroon in 1998 when he was six years old.

Kouandjio initially attended High Point High School in Beltsville, Maryland, where he played football for the Eagles program. After his sophomore year he was recruited and transferred to DeMatha Catholic High School in Hyattsville, Maryland along with his younger brother Cyrus, where he played football for the Stags program. He was a four-star recruit by Rivals.com. In February 2010, he committed to the University of Alabama to play college football.

== College career ==
Kouandjio was redshirted as a true freshman in 2010. As a redshirt freshman in 2011, he played in two games before a knee injury ended his season. As a sophomore in 2012, Kouandjio played in 11 of 14 games as a backup. He became a starter for the first time as junior in 2013, starting all 13 games. Kouandjio returned as a starter his senior year in 2014. He started all 14 games and was named a second-team All-American.

== Professional career ==
Pre-draft measurables
Height	Weight	Arm length	Hand span
6 ft 4 3/4 in (1.95 m)	310 lb (141 kg)	34 1/8 in (0.87 m)	10 7/8 in (0.28 m)
All values from NFL Combine

=== Washington Redskins (first stint) ===
The Washington Redskins selected Kouandjio in the fourth round with the 112th overall pick in the 2015 NFL draft. He signed a four-year contract on May 11, 2015.

On September 2, 2017, Kouandjio was waived by the Redskins.

=== Baltimore Ravens ===
On September 19, 2017, Kouandjio was signed to the practice squad of the Baltimore Ravens.

=== Washington Redskins (second stint) ===
On October 28, 2017, Kouandjio was signed by the Redskins off the Ravens' practice squad. He played in eight games in 2017, starting six at right guard.

On May 15, 2018, it was announced that Kouandjio would undergo quad surgery for a partial tear. The next week, following the surgery, it was reported that Kouandjio would miss the entire 2018 season.

=== New York Guardians ===
Kouandjio was selected by the New York Guardians of the XFL in the 10th round in phase two in the 2020 XFL draft.

== Personal life ==
Kouandjio's younger brother, Cyrus, who played at Alabama as an offensive tackle and was selected in second round of the 2014 NFL draft by the Buffalo Bills. Kouandjio became a US citizen on September 13, 2016.
