= 2008 Alabama Crimson Tide football team =

American college football season

2008 Alabama Crimson Tide football

SEC Western Division champion

SEC Championship Game, L 20–31 vs. Florida

Sugar Bowl, L 17–31 vs. Utah
- Conference: Southeastern Conference
- Western Division

Ranking
- Coaches: No. 6
- AP: No. 6
- Record: 12–2 (8–0 SEC)
- Head coach: Nick Saban (2nd season)
- Offensive coordinator: Jim McElwain (1st season)
- Offensive scheme: Multiple pro-style
- Defensive coordinator: Kirby Smart (1st season)
- Base defense: 3–4
- Captains: Antoine Caldwell; Rashad Johnson; John Parker Wilson
- Home stadium: Bryant–Denny Stadium

2008 Southeastern Conference football standings
	Conf.			Overall
Team	W		L	W		L
Eastern Division
No. 1 Florida x$#	7	–	1	13	–	1
No. 13 Georgia	6	–	2	10	–	3
Vanderbilt	4	–	4	7	–	6
South Carolina	4	–	4	7	–	6
Tennessee	3	–	5	5	–	7
Kentucky	2	–	6	7	–	6
Western Division
No. 6 Alabama x%	8	–	0	12	–	2
No. 14 Ole Miss	5	–	3	9	–	4
LSU	3	–	5	8	–	5
Arkansas	2	–	6	5	–	7
Auburn	2	–	6	5	–	7
Mississippi State	2	–	6	4	–	8
Championship: Florida 31, Alabama 20
# – BCS National Champion; $ – BCS representative as conference champion; % – BCS at-large representative; x – Division champion/co-champions; Rankings from AP Poll

The 2008 Alabama Crimson Tide football team represented the University of Alabama as a member of the Southeastern Conference (SEC) during the 2008 NCAA Division I FBS football season. Led by second-year head coach Nick Saban, the Crimson Tide compiled an overall record of 12–2 with a mark of 8–0 in conference play, winning the SEC's Western Division title. Alabama advanced to the SEC Championship Game, where the Crimson Tide lost to the eventual national champion, Florida. Alabama was then invited to the Sugar Bowl, losing to Utah. The team played home games at Bryant–Denny Stadium in Tuscaloosa, Alabama.

The Crimson Tide opened the season with an upset victory over No. 9 Clemson in the inaugural Chick-fil-A College Kickoff. After the win, Alabama returned home where they defeated non-conference opponents Tulane and Western Kentucky before they traveled to Fayetteville and defeated Arkansas for their first conference win of the season. The next week, The Crimson Tide upset No. 3 Georgia at Athens and moved into the No. 2 ranking. Alabama then defeated Kentucky, Ole Miss, Tennessee and Arkansas State prior to Saban's return to Baton Rouge as an opposing head coach.

In Week 10 of the season, Alabama became the No. 1 team in both the AP and Coaches polls as well as the Bowl Championship Series (BCS) standings. It was the first time the Crimson Tide had been ranked No. 1 in the regular season since November 1, 1980, when the top-ranked Tide fell to Mississippi State. It was also the first time Nick Saban had ever achieved the No. 1 position in the AP Poll and the first time in school history Alabama had reached No. 1 in the BCS standings. With their 27–21 overtime win over LSU, Alabama clinched a berth in the SEC Championship Game. The Crimson Tide finished their regular season undefeated with a 36–0 shutout victory over Auburn in the Iron Bowl. This was the Crimson Tide's first undefeated regular season since 1994 and the program's first SEC Western Division championship since the 1999 season. The Tide lost SEC Championship Game to Florida, 31–20. A month later, the Alabama concluded the season with a 31–17 upset loss in the Sugar Bowl against Utah, a game in which the Tide were favored by 10 points.

== Schedule ==
The Sagarin computer ratings calculated Alabama's strength of schedule to be the sixth most difficult out of the 120 Division I teams. The Cosgrove Computer Rankings calculated it as the eighth most difficult out of the 120 Division I FBS teams in its rankings. Alabama's 2008 schedule was officially released on January 4, 2008. It featured six pre-season AP Top 25 teams, five of which were ranked in the top 10, eight of which made bowl games in 2007.

In accordance with conference rules, Alabama faced all five Western Division opponents: Arkansas, Auburn, LSU, Mississippi State, and Ole Miss. They also faced three Eastern Division opponents: official SEC rival Tennessee, Georgia, and Kentucky. Alabama did not play SEC opponents South Carolina and Vanderbilt. Although not on the regular season schedule, Bama met Florida in the SEC Championship Game. Alabama also played four non-conference games. The non-conference schedule included games against Clemson of the Atlantic Coast Conference, Tulane of Conference USA and both Western Kentucky and Arkansas State of the Sun Belt Conference. For the 2009 Sugar Bowl, Alabama played Utah.

Date	Time	Opponent	Rank	Site	TV	Result	Attendance
August 30	7:00 p.m.	vs. No. 9 Clemson*	No. 24	Georgia Dome; Atlanta, GA (Chick-fil-A College Kickoff, rivalry, College GameDay)	ABC	W 34–10	70,097
September 6	6:00 p.m.	Tulane*	No. 13	Bryant–Denny Stadium; Tuscaloosa, AL	PPV	W 20–6	92,138
September 13	6:00 p.m.	Western Kentucky*	No. 11	Bryant–Denny Stadium; Tuscaloosa, AL	PPV	W 41–7	92,138
September 20	11:30 a.m.	at Arkansas	No. 9	Donald W. Reynolds Razorback Stadium; Fayetteville, AR	Raycom	W 49–14	72,315
September 27	6:45 p.m.	at No. 3 Georgia	No. 8	Sanford Stadium; Athens, GA (rivalry, College GameDay)	ESPN	W 41–30	92,746
October 4	2:30 p.m.	Kentucky	No. 2	Bryant–Denny Stadium; Tuscaloosa, AL	CBS	W 17–14	92,138
October 18	2:30 p.m.	Ole Miss	No. 2	Bryant–Denny Stadium; Tuscaloosa, AL (rivalry)	CBS	W 24–20	92,138
October 25	6:45 p.m.	at Tennessee	No. 2	Neyland Stadium; Knoxville, TN (Third Saturday in October)	ESPN	W 29–9	106,138
November 1	2:00 p.m.	Arkansas State*^{†}	No. 2	Bryant–Denny Stadium; Tuscaloosa, AL	PPV	W 35–0	92,138
November 8	2:30 p.m.	at No. 15 LSU	No. 1	Tiger Stadium; Baton Rouge, LA (rivalry, College GameDay)	CBS	W 27–21 ^{OT}	93,039
November 15	6:45 p.m.	Mississippi State	No. 1	Bryant–Denny Stadium; Tuscaloosa, AL (rivalry)	ESPN	W 32–7	92,138
November 29	2:30 p.m.	Auburn	No. 1	Bryant–Denny Stadium; Tuscaloosa, AL (Iron Bowl)	CBS	W 36–0	92,138
December 6	3:00 p.m.	vs. No. 2 Florida	No. 1	Georgia Dome; Atlanta, GA (SEC Championship Game, rivalry, College GameDay)	CBS	L 20–31	75,892
January 2, 2009	7:00 p.m.	vs. No. 7 Utah*	No. 4	Louisiana Superdome; New Orleans, LA (Sugar Bowl)	Fox	L 17–31	71,872
*Non-conference game; ^{†}Homecoming; Rankings from AP Poll released prior to the game; All times are in Central time

== Rankings ==
Entering the 2008 season, the Crimson Tide was ranked No. 24 in the AP Poll and was not ranked in the Coaches' Preseason Poll. After their upset victory over Clemson in week one, Alabama moved into the No. 13 position in the AP and No. 17 in the Coaches' Poll. The Crimson Tide continued to move up in both polls each week through week seven when they reached the No. 2 position in both polls after their victory at Georgia. The Crimson Tide remained in the No. 2 position over the next four weeks until No. 1 Texas was upset by Texas Tech in week nine. In the polls released after the Texas loss, the Crimson Tide moved into the No. 1 position in both polls. Alabama remained in the No. 1 position until their loss in the SEC Championship Game to Florida when they dropped into the No. 4 position prior to their bowl game appearance. They then ended the season with a final ranking of No. 6 in both polls after their loss to Utah in the Sugar Bowl.

Ranking movements Legend: ██ Increase in ranking ██ Decrease in ranking RV = Received votes
	Week																
Poll	Pre	1	2	3	4	5	6	7	8	9	10	11	12	13	14	15	Final
AP	24	13	11	9	8	2	2	2	2	2	1	1	1	1	1	4	6
Coaches	RV	17	16	13	10	4	4	2	2	2	1	1	1	1	1	4	6
Harris	Not released					3	3	2	2	2	1	1	1	1	1	4	Not released
BCS	Not released								2	2	1	1	1	1	1	4	Not released

== Before the season ==
During the 2007 campaign, the Crimson Tide completed a 6–6 regular season record with their most notable wins coming over No. 16 Arkansas and longtime rival Tennessee. The Tide went on to win their final game against Colorado (30–24) in the Independence Bowl to finish with a 7–6 record. In June 2009, the NCAA Committee on Infractions sanctioned Alabama for "major violations" of NCAA policies as a result of athletes who received improper benefits in 16 of 19 NCAA sports, including football. As part of the penalties imposed, the football program was forced to vacate five victories from the 2007 season making the official 2007 record 2–6.

In February 2008, Alabama signed the No. 1 recruiting class according to both Rivals and Scout. Spring practice began on March 13 and concluded with the annual A-Day game on April 12. Before a crowd of 78,200, the Crimson team defeated the White team by a score of 24–14 in Bryant–Denny Stadium. For their performances, Alfred McCullough earned the Dwight Stephenson Lineman of the A-Day Game Award and Terry Grant earned the Dixie Howell Memorial Most Valuable Player of the A-Day Game Award.

=== Returning starters ===
Alabama had 18 returning starters from the previous season, including nine on offense, five on defense, and all of the special teams. The most notable departures from the previous year were D. J. Hall and Justin Britt on offense and Wallace Gilberry, Darren Mustin, Keith Saunders, Ezekial Knight, Simeon Castille and Marcus Carter on defense.

Offense

Player	Class	Position
John Parker Wilson	Senior	Quarterback
Terry Grant	Sophomore	Running back
Mike McCoy	Junior	Wide receiver
Travis McCall	Senior	Tight end
Nick Walker	Senior	Tight end
Antoine Caldwell	Senior	Center
Marlon Davis	Senior	Offensive tackle
Andre Smith	Junior	Offensive tackle
Mike Johnson	Junior	Offensive guard

Defense

Player	Class	Position
Brandon Deaderick	Junior	Defensive end
Lorenzo Washington	Junior	Nose tackle
Rolando McClain	Sophomore	Linebacker
Rashad Johnson	Senior	Safety
Kareem Jackson	Sophomore	Cornerback

Special teams

Player	Class	Position
P. J. Fitzgerald	Junior	Punter
Leigh Tiffin	Junior	Placekicker
Javier Arenas	Junior	Return specialist
Brian Selman	Junior	Long snapper

== Game summaries ==
=== Clemson ===
Chick-fil-A College Kickoff

Team	1	2	3	4	Total
• #24 Alabama	13	10	8	3	34
#9 Clemson	0	3	7	0	10

- Location: Atlanta, Georgia
- Game start: 8:12 p.m.
- Elapsed time: 3:23
- Game attendance: 70,097
- Game weather: Indoors
- Referee: Thomas Ritter
- TV announcers (ABC): Brent Musburger (play-by-play), Kirk Herbstreit (color), Erin Andrews (sideline), Lisa Salters (sideline)

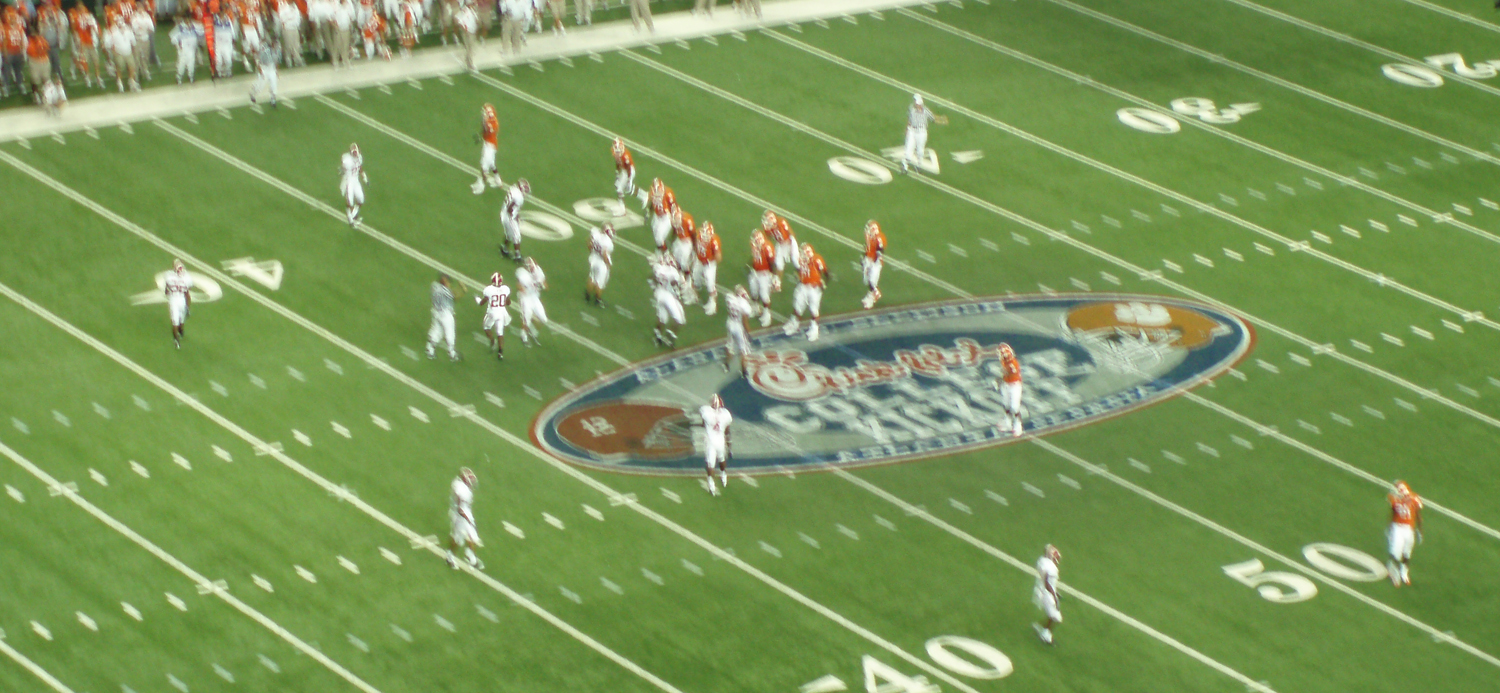
Clemson lines up on offense during the third quarter.

In January 2008, officials from both Clemson and Alabama announced they would open the 2008 season against each other in the inaugural Chick-fil-A College Kickoff at the Georgia Dome in Atlanta. With ESPN's College GameDay in town, and Clemson, selected as the preseason favorite to win the Atlantic Coast Conference, the Crimson Tide upset the Tigers 34–10 to open the season.

After opening the scoring on a 54-yard Leigh Tiffin field goal, Cory Reamer forced a Jamie Harper fumble recovered by Dont'a Hightower at the Clemson 31. The ensuing drive resulted in a 21-yard Tiffin field goal and a 6–0 lead. After holding the Tigers to a three and out, the Tide reached the end zone for the first time on the evening on a one-yard John Parker Wilson touchdown run to extend the lead to 13–0. After Mark Buchholz hit a 33-yard field goal early in the second quarter, Alabama extended their lead to 20–3 after Wilson hit Nick Walker for a four-yard touchdown reception on the following drive. After a missed 52-yard Tiffin field goal, Marquis Johnson intercepted a Cullen Harper pass on the next Clemson possession to set up a 34-yard Tiffin field goal as time expired to give Alabama a 23–3 halftime lead. Clemson opened the second half with C. J. Spiller returning the opening kickoff 96 yards for a touchdown to cut the lead to 23–10. Alabama responded later in the third quarter with a four-yard Wilson touchdown pass to Julio Jones in extending the lead to 31–10. Tiffin added the final points of the evening on a 26-yard field goal to cap a 14 play, 78 yard drive in bringing the final score to 34–10.

James Davis and C.J. Spiller, the duo known as "Thunder and Lightning," combined for only 20 yards on the ground, while the team's rushing total was 0. Clemson's redshirt senior quarterback, Cullen Harper, completed 20 of 34 passes but had no touchdowns and one interception. Alabama's John Parker Wilson completed 22 of 30 passes with no interceptions. The victory improved Alabama's all-time record against the Tigers to 12–3.

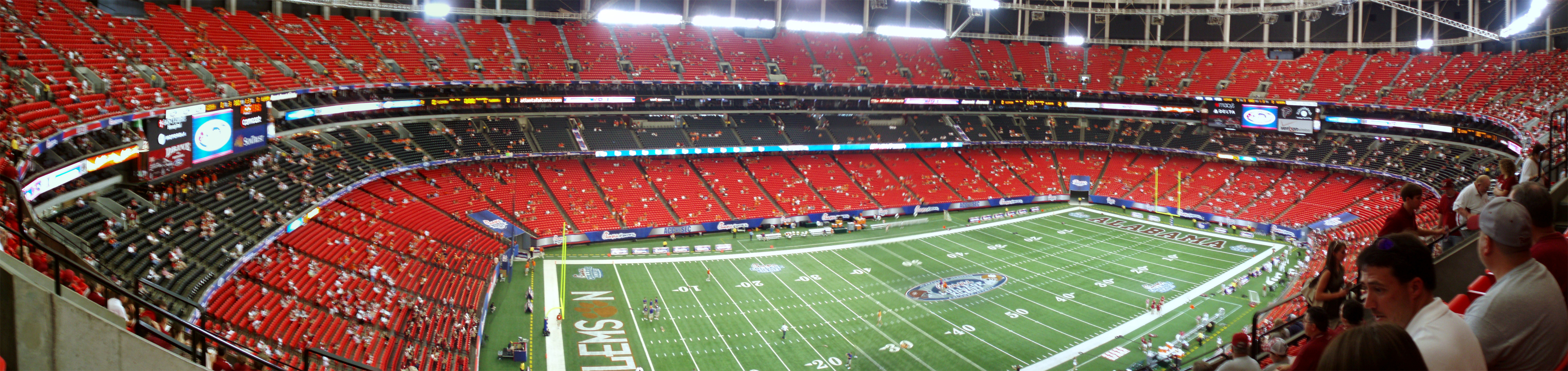
The interior of the Georgia Dome prior to kickoff.

=== Tulane ===
Team	1	2	3	4	Total
Tulane	0	3	0	3	6
• #13 Alabama	13	0	7	0	20

- Location: Tuscaloosa, Alabama
- Game start: 6:07 p.m.
- Elapsed time: 3:04
- Game attendance: 92,138
- Game weather: 82 °F (28 °C), Mostly cloudy
- Referee: Matt Austin
- TV announcers (CTSN PPV): Chris Stewart (play-by-play), Tyler Watts (color), Barry Krauss (sideline)

Alabama's season home-opener saw the Crimson Tide defeat Tulane 20–6, in the 41st meeting between the two teams and the first since 1994. Alabama received the opening kickoff, but went three-and-out on their first possession. After the Bama defense stopped Tulane on their opening possession, Javier Arenas ignited the crowd on an 87-yard punt return for a touchdown and a 7–0 lead. Later in the first quarter, Chris Rogers returned a blocked punt 17-yards for a touchdown, though freshman kicker Corey Smith missed the extra point resulting in a 13–0 lead. Tulane scored the only points of the second quarter on a 35-yard Ross Thevenot field goal in bringing the halftime score to 13–3.

At the end of the third, Mark Ingram II scored the lone offensive touchdown of the game on a 15-yard run and a 21-yard Thevenot field goal in the fourth brought the game to its final 20–6 margin. For the game, Javier Arenas set a school record with 147 yards on punt returns, eclipsing the previous mark of 141 yards set by Harry Gilmer against Georgia in 1947. For his performance, Arenas was named the SEC Special Teams Player of the Week. The victory improved Alabama's all-time record against the Green Wave to 27–11–3.

=== WKU ===
Team	1	2	3	4	Total
WKU	0	7	0	0	7
• #11 Alabama	17	14	10	0	41

- Location: Tuscaloosa, Alabama
- Game start: 6:07 p.m.
- Elapsed time: 2:51
- Game attendance: 92,138
- Game weather: Fair, 88 °F (31 °C), Wind: 13 mph (21 km/h) from SSE
- Referee: Penn Wagers
- TV announcers (CTSN PPV): Chris Stewart (play-by-play), Tyler Watts (color), Barry Krauss (sideline)

In week three, Alabama defeated the Western Kentucky Hilltoppers 41–7, who were playing their second season in the FBS. The Bama defense held the Hilltoppers offense to a three-and-out on their first drive of the game. The Crimson Tide offense took over and completed a twelve-play drive that ended with a seven-yard touchdown run by Mark Ingram II. WKU fumbled on the first play of their subsequent drive, and Alabama recovered the ball on the WKU 17-yard line, setting up a 22-yard field goal by Leigh Tiffin. Ingram scored his second touchdown of the afternoon on a five-yard run to give Alabama a 17–0 at the end of the first quarter. Alabama scored on their first possession of the second quarter on an eight-yard Terry Grant touchdown run to cap a 9-play, 78-yard drive. John Parker Wilson threw an interception on the first play of the next drive. This set up the Hilltoppers' lone score of the afternoon on a 30-yard touchdown reception by Tristan Jones from David Wolke. Alabama put one more touchdown on the scoreboard on a two-yard Nick Walker reception from Wilson, to take a 31–7 lead into halftime.

On the first drive of the second half, the Bama offense was held to a 25-yard, Tiffin field goal, making the score 34–7. The defense held WKU to a three-and-out on their first possession of the second half. This set up a seven-play, 55-yard drive that ended with a 12-yard touchdown pass from Wilson to Julio Jones. Alabama benched most of their starters at the end of the third quarter, and neither team scored in the fourth quarter, to make the final score of 41–7.

=== Arkansas ===
Team	1	2	3	4	Total
• #9 Alabama	21	14	7	7	49
Arkansas	0	7	0	7	14

- Location: Fayetteville, Arkansas
- Game start: 11:34 a.m.
- Elapsed time: 2:57
- Game attendance: 72,315
- Game weather: Partly cloudy, 65 °F (18 °C), Wind: 3 mph (4.8 km/h) from NNE
- Referee: Matt Austin
- TV announcers (Raycom): Dave Neal (play-by-play), David Archer (color), Dave Baker (sideline)

In what was head coach Bobby Petrino's first game against Alabama, the Crimson Tide were victorious by a final score of 49–14 against the Arkansas Razorbacks in Fayetteville. The Tide received the opening kickoff, and put together a ten-play, 71-yard drive with Mark Ingram II scoring on a one-yard touchdown run. Arkansas was forced to punt on their first drive, and on the first play of the subsequent Alabama drive, Glen Coffee ran 87 yards for the Tide's second touchdown and a 14–0 lead. In the final minute of the first quarter, Javier Arenas intercepted a Casey Dick pass and returned it 63-yards for a touchdown to give Alabama a 21–0 lead at the end of the first quarter.

Arkansas started their next drive at their own 47-yard line after a 41-yard kickoff return by Dennis Johnson, and drove 53-yards for a touchdown, scoring on fourth-and-one from the Bama twelve-yard line on a Dick pass to Andrew Davie. Bama responded with a 68-yard drive capped off by a 25-yard touchdown pass from John Parker Wilson to Julio Jones. Arkansas put together a steady drive on their next possession, but Justin Woodall intercepted Dick at the Bama 26-yard line and returned it 74-yards for a touchdown. Arkansas put together another solid drive, but facing a first and goal at the Bama one-yard line, Arkansas was kept out by the stout Bama defense on a goal line stand to close out the half with Bama up 35–7.

Arkansas received the second half kickoff, but Alabama's Marquis Johnson intercepted Dick's pass on the first play of the second half, to set up a 31-yard touchdown run by Glen Coffee. By the end of the third quarter, both teams had put in their substitutes. On Alabama's first possession of the fourth quarter, backup quarterback Greg McElroy's pass was intercepted by Ramon Broadway, setting up a 10-yard touchdown pass by Arkansas second-string quarterback Tyler Wilson to Michael Smith. On the first play of Bama's next drive, Roy Upchurch ran 62-yards for Alabama's final touchdown to make the final score 49–14. The 49 points were the most points scored by Alabama in an SEC game since a 59–28 victory over Vanderbilt in 1990. The victory improved Alabama's all-time record against the Razorbacks to 9–8 (12–7 without NCAA vacations and forfeits).

=== Georgia ===
Team	1	2	3	4	Total
• #8 Alabama	10	21	0	10	41
#3 Georgia	0	0	10	20	30

- Location: Athens, Georgia
- Game start: 7:48 p.m.
- Elapsed time: 3:10
- Game attendance: 92,746
- Game weather: Cloudy, 72 °F (22 °C), Wind: 1 mph (1.6 km/h) from WNW
- Referee: Marc Curles
- TV announcers (ESPN): Mike Patrick (play-by-play), Todd Blackledge (color), Holly Rowe (sideline)

With ESPN's College Gameday in Athens, and Georgia wearing black jerseys for only the third time in school history, the Crimson Tide upset the Bulldogs 41–30, in a game that will forever be known as "The Blackout". Georgia won the opening coin toss, deferring to receive in the second half. Alabama quickly took control of the game, moving the ball 73-yards before Mark Ingram II ran for a 7-yard touchdown to make the score 7–0. After the Bulldogs failed to move the ball on their first drive, the Tide again put points on the board as Leigh Tiffin kicked a 23-yard field goal with 4:51 left in the first quarter, to give Alabama 10–0 lead.

After the Bulldogs offense again failed to move the ball, Alabama began a drive at the Georgia 48-yard line. Two plays later, a 31-yard pass from John Parker Wilson to Julio Jones moved the ball inside of the Georgia five-yard line. Glen Coffee ran in for his third touchdown of the season, and Alabama led 17–0. On Georgia's next drive, quarterback Matthew Stafford completed a 16-yard pass to wide receiver A. J. Green, who fumbled the ball which was subsequently fumbled and recovered by Dont'a Hightower. After a short drive, Roy Upchurch scored Alabama's third rushing touchdown to extend their lead to 24–0. Before the halftime break, Wilson connected with Julio Jones for a 22-yard touchdown pass as Alabama led 31–0 at half.

In the second half, Georgia's offense began moving the ball, scoring on their first drive of the half when Blair Walsh kicked a 33-yard field goal. On Alabama's sixth drive of the game, Georgia defense forced a three-and-out for the first time, forcing a P. J. Fitzgerald punt. Georgia again cut into the lead later in the third quarter when running back Knowshon Moreno ran for a two-yard touchdown, to cap a 58-yard drive and cut Alabama's lead to 31–10. Georgia made it a game again when Prince Miller returned a Fitzgerald punt for a 92-yard touchdown making the score 31–17. They wouldn't get any closer. On the following drive, Alabama extended their lead to 34–17 on a 32-yard Leigh Tiffin field goal. On a crucial drive in the fourth quarter, Alabama converted when Glen Coffee gave Alabama a 41–17 lead by scoring his second rushing touchdown of the game on a 12-yard run. The following drive, Georgia struck back when Matthew Stafford completed a 24-yard touchdown pass to Michael Moore, though failed in an attempted two-point conversion. Georgia got the ball back after a successful onside kick, starting their drive at the Alabama 40-yard line. A. J. Green caught a 21-yard touchdown pass from Stafford again for their final score of the game, as Alabama survived 41–30. With the victory, the Crimson Tide snapped a three-game losing streak to the Bulldogs, dating back to the 1995 season. The 41 points were the most ever scored by the Tide against Georgia, and the victory improved Alabama's all-time record against the Bulldogs to 36–25–4.

=== Kentucky ===
Team	1	2	3	4	Total
Kentucky	0	0	7	7	14
• #2 Alabama	14	0	0	3	17

- Location: Tuscaloosa, Alabama
- Game start: 3:35 p.m.
- Elapsed time: 3:10
- Game attendance: 92,138
- Game weather: Sunny, 86 °F (30 °C), Wind: 4 mph (6.4 km/h) from SW
- Referee: Hubert Owens
- TV announcers (CBS): Verne Lundquist (play-by-play), Gary Danielson (color), Tracy Wolfson (sideline)

The Crimson Tide entered their game against the Kentucky Wildcats as the No. 2 ranked team in America, their highest ranking in fifteen years, and escaped with a 17–14 victory. After early stalled drives from each team, Alabama began their first successful drive with 12:25 left in the first quarter. Glen Coffee ran ahead for a short, 3-yard gain, and on the next play, John Parker Wilson connected with Julio Jones for a 40-yard pass; however, the play was negated following a penalty. On the next play, Coffee rushed through the middle of the line for a 78-yard touchdown, his second longest and fifth rushing touchdown of the season. With under two minutes to go, Kentucky quarterback Mike Hartline fumbled while attempting a pass, which Alabama linebacker Rolando McClain recovered and returned four yards for a touchdown. Leigh Tiffin missed the extra point, though after an offside penalty, he was given another attempt which he converted. After both offenses failed to score in the second quarter, Alabama took a 14–0 lead into the halftime break.

Halfway into the third quarter, Kentucky's offense finally got on the scoreboard when Hartline connected on a 26-yard touchdown pass to Dicky Lyons Jr. Once more, both offenses were unable to move the ball for rest of the third quarter. Early in the fourth quarter, Alabama began their second-to-last drive with 11:10 remaining, defending a 14–7 lead. The drive included twelve rushing attempts and a pass to Julio Jones, as Alabama moved the ball 81 yards in just over eight minutes. After a delay of game penalty, Leigh Tiffin connected on the game-winning, 24-yard field goal which gave Alabama a 17–7 lead. With 2:12 remaining, Hartline and the Kentucky offense again took the field. After a mix of successful and incomplete passes, Kentucky faced a 3rd-and-10 on the Crimson Tide 48-yard line. A 48-yard touchdown pass from Hartline to receiver DeMoreo Ford cut the Alabama lead to three. A failed onside kick attempt ended Kentucky's hope for a comeback, as Alabama escaped with a 17–14 victory.

Despite the lack of offensive points, Alabama running back Glen Coffee rushed for a season-high 218 yards on 25 attempts, including a touchdown and two fumbles. The 218 yards gained by Coffee was the most by an Alabama rusher since Shaun Alexander in 1996. The victory improved Alabama's all-time record against the Wildcats to 34–2–1.

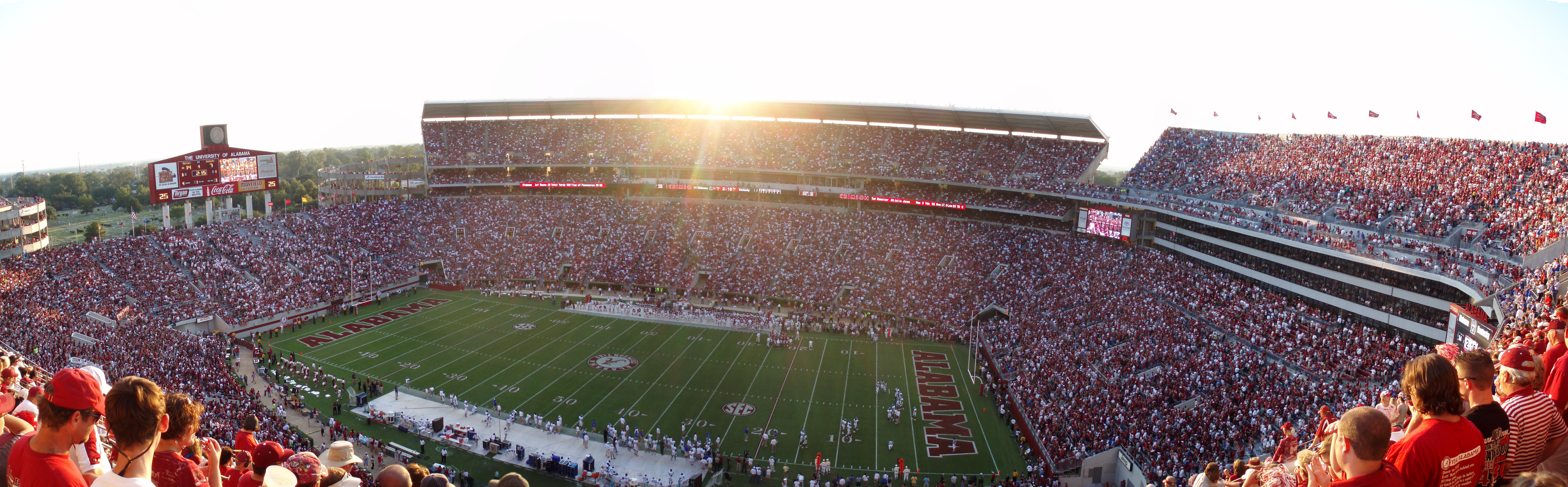
The interior of Bryant-Denny Stadium during the fourth quarter.

=== Ole Miss ===
Alabama–Ole Miss football rivalry

Team	1	2	3	4	Total
Ole Miss	3	0	7	10	20
• #2 Alabama	7	17	0	0	24

- Location: Tuscaloosa, Alabama
- Game start: 2:35 p.m.
- Elapsed time: 3:10
- Game attendance: 92,138
- Game weather: Sunny, 72 °F (22 °C), Wind: 13 mph (21 km/h) from N
- Referee: Matt Moore
- TV announcers (CBS): Verne Lundquist (play-by-play), Gary Danielson (color), Tracy Wolfson (sideline)

Playing after their first bye week of the season, Alabama returned to the field and defeated their long-time rival Ole Miss Rebels 24–20. After several early failed drives in the opening quarter, Ole Miss became the first team to score on Alabama in the first quarter, as well as the first to have a lead against the Crimson Tide in 2008 after a successful 25-yard Joshua Shene field goal. The Crimson Tide responded on their next drive with a 26-yard touchdown pass from John Parker Wilson to Marquis Maze to take a 7–3 lead to end the first quarter. Ole Miss had limited offense in the second quarter as the Tide defense held a shutout for the remainder of the half. However, the offense scored 17 points coming on a 2-yard run from Mark Ingram II, a 41-yard field goal from Leigh Tiffin, and a 30-yard touchdown pass from Wilson to Mike McCoy to take a 24–3 at halftime.

However, the second half was different as the Crimson Tide failed to score for the remainder of the game. Ole Miss head coach Houston Nutt gambled on a 4th-and-goal with a fake field goal attempt, as Rob Park passed to Jason Cook for a 9-yard touchdown. Several minutes into the fourth quarter, Ole Miss again cut Alabama's lead to 24–17 after Jevan Snead threw a 17-yard touchdown strike to Shay Hodge. Three minutes later, Shene hit a 35-yard field goal to cut Alabama's lead to 24–20. A stalled drive forced Alabama punter P. J. Fitzgerald to give the ball to the Rebels with 3:03 left. The Rebels moved the ball steadily down the field over the next two minutes, however turned it over on downs after a failed 4th-and-5 on Alabama's 43-yard line. The victory pushed Alabama to 6–0, giving them bowl eligibility, and was the team's fifth in a row over the Rebels and improved Alabama's all-time record against Ole Miss to 42–9–2 (46–8–2 without NCAA vacations and forfeits).

=== Tennessee ===
Third Saturday in October

Team	1	2	3	4	Total
• #2 Alabama	6	7	9	7	29
Tennessee	3	0	0	6	9

- Location: Knoxville, Tennessee
- Game start: 7:46 p.m.
- Elapsed time: 3:09
- Game attendance: 106,138
- Game weather: Partly Cloudy, 54 °F (12 °C), Wind: 5 mph (8.0 km/h) from W
- Referee: Thomas Ritter
- TV announcers (ESPN): Mike Patrick (play-by-play), Todd Blackledge (color), Holly Rowe (sideline)

In their annual rivalry game, Alabama met their rival to the north in the Tennessee Volunteers and was victorious 29–9. Teams traded field goals in the first quarter with Leigh Tiffin converting from 39 and 43 yards for Alabama and Daniel Lincoln converting one from 31 yards for Tennessee to give the Tide a 6–3 at the end the first quarter. In the second quarter, the Crimson Tide offense moved down the field with Glen Coffee scoring on a three-yard touchdown run. With 2:41 remaining in the first half, the Volunteers started their final drive of the half at their own 22-yard line. The Tennessee offense quickly moved the ball down the field with several key Nick Stephens completions. A 5-yard procedure penalty on the offense set up a third-and-six on Alabama's 19-yard line. Stephens completed a pass to Lucas Taylor; however, it did not count as Taylor was flagged for offensive pass interference. After failing to gain enough yardage on third down, the Volunteers again attempted a field goal, and after a timeout in attempt to "ice the kicker" by Nick Saban, Lincoln missed his second field goal of the game to give Alabama a 13–3 halftime lead.

The Tide quickly took control of the third quarter, forcing a three-and-out on Tennessee's first possession. Alabama answered with a 30-yard Tiffin field goal to extend their lead to 16–3. After another forced three-and-out, Alabama steadily moved the ball downfield before John Parker Wilson rushed for a one-yard touchdown. However, the two-point conversion was not successful and Alabama led 22–3. Early in the fourth quarter, Roy Upchurch sealed the Alabama victory with a four-yard touchdown run. A Josh Briscoe touchdown reception from Stephens cut into the lead, but the Tide stopped the two-point conversion, giving them a 29–9 victory. The victory improved Alabama's all-time record against Tennessee to 45–38–7 (47–37–7 without NCAA vacations and forfeits). It was the final game of the rivalry for Tennessee head coach Phillip Fulmer, who resigned 10 days later.

=== Arkansas State ===
Team	1	2	3	4	Total
Arkansas State	0	0	0	0	0
• #2 Alabama	7	7	14	7	35

- Location: Tuscaloosa, Alabama
- Game start: 2:07 p.m.
- Elapsed time: 2:42
- Game attendance: 92,138
- Game weather: Sunny, 74 °F (23 °C), Wind: 4 mph (6.4 km/h) from NE
- Referee: Ken Williamson
- TV announcers (CTSN PPV): Chris Stewart (play-by-play), Tyler Watts (color), Barry Krauss (sideline)

Alabama faced the Arkansas State Red Wolves for only the second time in school history, the first being a 34–7 victory in the 1982 season, and was victorious 35–0. The Crimson Tide offense got on the scoreboard first after a stalled Red Wolves opening drive. After the Crimson Tide offense drove 89-yards in just under eight minutes, Glen Coffee ran for a 9-yard touchdown to give Alabama a 7–0 lead. Both offenses failed to move the ball far down field, resulting in several punts and a Wilson interception by Red Wolves defensive back Dominique Williams. Midway through the fourth quarter, Alabama safety Rashad Johnson intercepted a Corey Leonard pass and returned it for 32-yards and a touchdown to give the Tide a 14–0 at the half.

On Alabama's opening second half drive, Roy Upchurch ran for a 22-yard touchdown to give Alabama a 21–0 lead. Both offenses again stalled before Alabama's freshman running back Mark Ingram II ran for a 5-yard touchdown to extend the Crimson Tide lead to 28–0. Midway through the fourth quarter, Ingram again scored on a 17-yard rush for the final score of the game. Ingram finished the game with 12 carries for 113 yards, including two touchdowns, and for his performance was named the SEC Freshman of the Week. The following day, the Crimson Tide achieved their first regular season No. 1 ranking in the AP Poll since the 1980 season, and their first ever #1 BCS ranking.

=== LSU ===
Alabama–LSU football rivalry

Team	1	2	3	4	OT	Total
• #1 Alabama	7	7	7	0	6	27
#15 LSU	14	0	0	7	0	21

- Location: Baton Rouge, Louisiana
- Game start: 2:35 p.m.
- Elapsed time: 3:49
- Game attendance: 92,138
- Game weather: Clear, 78 °F (26 °C), Wind: 12-15 mph (24 km/h) from W
- Referee: Penn Wagers
- TV announcers (CBS): Verne Lundquist (play-by-play), Gary Danielson (color), Tracy Wolfson (sideline)

Nick Saban returned to Tiger Stadium for the first time since his tenure as the Miami Dolphins head coach. Alabama entered the game as the No. 1 ranked team in all major polls, and defeated the LSU Tigers 27–21 in overtime. Alabama's offense quickly got the ball moving, as the team marched down to the LSU 26-yard line. John Parker Wilson passed to Earl Alexander, who proceeded to pick up 25-yards before fumbling out of the endzone, resulting in a touchback for the Tigers. On the first LSU possession, the Tigers ran three plays for a loss of seven yards before Alabama safety Rashad Johnson intercepted Jarrett Lee, returning it to the LSU 15-yard line. Glen Coffee moved the ball to the goal line, before John Parker Wilson dove into the endzone two plays later for a 7–0 lead. The Tigers came back to tie the game on their next drive as Jarrett Lee completed a 30-yard touchdown pass to Demetrius Byrd. On the ensuing kickoff, Alabama's Javier Arenas fumbled the ball, which was recovered by Josh Jasper at the Tide's 30-yard line. After a Lee incomplete pass, running back Charles Scott scored on a 30-yard rush, giving LSU a 14–7 lead. After both offenses slowed down, Alabama tied the game after Rashad Johnson intercepted a pass, and returned it for 54-yards and a touchdown to tie the score at 14–14 at the half.

Early in the third quarter, Alabama regained the lead 21–14 on a three-yard Glen Coffee touchdown run. Both offenses again began to struggle, as Alabama punted on their next two possessions. Early in the first quarter, LSU put together a long possession which ran more than six minutes off the game clock. Charles Scott ran for his second touchdown of the game as the Tigers tied the game at 21–21 with 6:12 left on the clock. With 1:58 left in the game, Alabama received the ball on their own 41-yard line following another LSU punt. Glen Coffee and the offense steadily moved the ball downfield to the LSU eleven-yard line. With several seconds left on the clock, Alabama lined up for a game-winning, 29-yard field goal from Leigh Tiffin. However, Tiffin missed his second field goal of the game when Ricky Jean-Francois blocked the field goal, sending the game into overtime.

Alabama won the overtime coin toss, choosing to play on defense first. On their first possession, Charles Scott of LSU ran for a 5-yard gain. Richard Murphy rushed for a loss of one on the following play, as Alabama linebacker Rolando McClain stopped him short of the line of scrimmage. On third down, Jarrett Lee threw his fourth interception of the game when Rashad Johnson again intercepted a pass. The interception ended LSU's first overtime possession, giving the ball to Alabama. The Tide offense came out throwing, as John Parker Wilson completed a 23-yard strike to Julio Jones, moving the ball to the two-yard line of LSU. After a short rush by Glen Coffee, Wilson plunged through a pile of players to get his second rushing touchdown, and preserve Alabama's unblemished record. With the win, the Crimson Tide clinched the SEC West Division, and a spot in the 2008 SEC Championship Game, and improved Alabama's all-time record against the Tigers to 44–23–5.

=== Mississippi State ===
Alabama–Mississippi State football rivalry

Team	1	2	3	4	Total
Mississippi State	0	7	0	0	7
• #1 Alabama	5	7	10	10	32

- Location: Tuscaloosa, Alabama
- Game start: 6:47 p.m.
- Elapsed time: 3:03
- Game attendance: 92,138
- Game weather: Partly cloudy, 54 °F (12 °C), Wind: 10 mph (16 km/h) from NW
- Referee: Ken Williamson
- TV announcers (ESPN): Mike Patrick (play-by-play), Todd Blackledge (color), Holly Rowe (sideline)

A week after their overtime victory over LSU, Alabama returned home and defeated the Mississippi State Bulldogs 32–7. Alabama took an early 2–0 lead after a Blake McAdams punt was blocked by Kareem Jackson and recovered by State in their endzone for a safety on the Bulldogs' first offensive possession. After holding the Tide on the following series, State's Tyson Lee committed a fumble that was recovered by Brandon Fanney. The subsequent Alabama drive was capped with a 35-yard Leigh Tiffin field goal to give the Tide a 5–0 lead at the end of the first quarter. The Bulldogs responded early in the second quarter and took a 7–5 lead after Tyson Lee hit Jamayel Smith for a 31-yard touchdown reception. Alabama retook the lead and would not relinquish it again late in the second after a one-yard John Parker Wilson touchdown run.

After holding the Bulldogs on their opening possession of the second half, the Tide extended their lead to 19–7 when Javier Arenas returned a punt 80-yards for a touchdown. Tiffin added a pair of field goals from 34 and 35 yards out respectively before Mark Ingram II scored the final points of the game on a one-yard touchdown run late in the fourth quarter and made the final score 32–7. In the game, Arenas broke both of Harry Gilmer's Alabama single game record for punt return yardage with 153 on six attempts, and the all-time record for punt return yardage in a career. The victory improved Alabama's all-time record against the Bulldogs to 72–18–3 (71–19–3 without NCAA vacations and forfeits).

=== Auburn ===
Iron Bowl

Team	1	2	3	4	Total
Auburn	0	0	0	0	0
• #1 Alabama	3	7	19	7	36

- Location: Tuscaloosa, Alabama
- Game start: 2:47 p.m.
- Elapsed time: 3:10
- Game attendance: 92,138
- Game weather: Cloudy, 62 °F (17 °C); Wind 3 mph (4.8 km/h) from ENE
- Referee: Matt Austin
- TV announcers (CBS): Verne Lundquist (play-by-play), Gary Danielson (color), Tracy Wolfson (sideline)

In the Iron Bowl, the Crimson Tide snapped a six-game losing streak against the Auburn Tigers with a 36–0 victory. Alabama took a 3–0 lead at the end of the first quarter when Leigh Tiffin connected on a 37-yard field goal. Glen Coffee extended their lead to 10–0 on a 41-yard touchdown run. At the end of the second quarter, Auburn's Morgan Hull appeared to connect on a 39-yard field goal. However, Alabama's Nick Saban called a time-out just before the play to negate the field goal in an attempt to ice the kicker. On the re-kick, Bama's Bobby Greenwood blocked the field goal attempt to preserve a 10–0 Crimson Tide lead at the half.

In the third quarter, Alabama scored 19 points on a trio of touchdowns. The first came on a 39-yard Nikita Stover reception from John Parker Wilson, and after Tiffin's extra point was blocked by Mike McNeil, Bama led 16–0. Mark Ingram II scored the second and third touchdowns of the third on runs of one and fourteen yards. Up 29–0 going into the fourth quarter, Alabama pulled most of its starters late in the game. As such, the final points of the evening came on a 34-yard touchdown pass from back-up quarterback Greg McElroy to Marquis Maze to make the final score 36–0.

The victory was Alabama's first win against the Tigers since 2001 and the first all-time victory over Auburn at Bryant–Denny Stadium. The victory improved Alabama's all-time record against the Tigers to 39–33–1.

=== Florida—SEC Championship Game ===
SEC Championship Game

Team	1	2	3	4	Total
#1 Alabama	10	0	10	0	20
• #2 Florida	7	10	0	14	31

- Location: Atlanta, Georgia
- Game start: 4:13 p.m.
- Elapsed time: 3:13
- Game attendance: 75,892
- Game weather: Indoors
- Referee: Thomas Ritter
- TV announcers (CBS): Verne Lundquist (play-by-play), Gary Danielson (color), Tracy Wolfson (sideline)

In the 2008 edition of the SEC Championship Game, the Crimson Tide met the Florida Gators for the sixth time, and lost 31–20. Florida took a 7–0 lead midway through the first quarter when Tim Tebow threw a three-yard touchdown pass to Carl Moore. On the next possession, Alabama responded with a two-play, 82-yard drive to tie the game at 7–7. The drive included a 64-yard pass play from John Parker Wilson to Julio Jones and an 18-yard touchdown run by Glen Coffee. The Tide then took a 10–7 lead late in the quarter after Leigh Tiffin connected on a 30-yard field goal. The Gators tied the game at 10–10 in the second quarter after Jonathan Phillips connected on a 19-yard field goal, and then Tebow hit David Nelson for a five-yard touchdown reception and a 17–10 at the half.

In the third, Alabama tied the game after Mark Ingram II scored on a two-yard touchdown run, and took a 20–17 lead into the fourth quarter after a 27-yard Tiffin field goal with only 00:08 remaining in the third. The Gators responded with a pair of fourth-quarter touchdowns to secure a 31–20 victory. The first came on a one-yard Jeffery Demps run and the second on a five-yard Tebow pass to Riley Cooper. The loss brought Alabama's all-time record against the Gators to 20–14 (21–14 without the NCAA vacation of the 2005 victory).

=== Utah—Sugar Bowl ===
Sugar Bowl

Team	1	2	3	4	Total
• #7 Utah	21	0	7	3	31
#4 Alabama	0	10	7	0	17

- Location: New Orleans, Louisiana
- Game start: 7:18 p.m.
- Elapsed time: 3:26
- Game attendance: 71,872
- Game weather: Indoors
- Referee: Scott Novak
- TV announcers (FOX): Kenny Albert (play-by-play), Darryl Johnston (color), Charissa Thompson (sideline), Chris Myers (sideline)

After falling to the eventual national champion Florida Gators in the SEC Championship Game, the Crimson Tide were selected with an at-large bid to play in the 2009 Sugar Bowl against the Mountain West Conference champion Utah Utes. Before the game, Alabama's All-American left tackle Andre Smith was suspended. Utah took a commanding 21–0 lead in the first quarter and did not relinquish it for the remainder of the game. Utah scored first on a seven-yard Brent Casteel reception from Brian Johnson, second on a two-yard Matt Asiata run and third on an 18-yard Bradon Godfrey reception from Johnson. Alabama responded and cut the lead to 21–10 at the half after a 52-yard Leigh Tiffin field goal and a 73-yard Javier Arenas punt return for a touchdown.

The Crimson Tide brought the score to 21–17 early in the third when John Parker Wilson threw a four-yard touchdown reception to Glen Coffee. However, Utah closed the game with ten unanswered points on a 28-yard David Reed touchdown reception from Johnson and a 28-yard Louie Sakoda field goal to secure their 31–17 victory.

== Personnel ==
=== Coaching staff ===
Prior to the 2008 season, Alabama made several changes to its coaching staff. Alabama lost their tight ends and special teams coach, Ron Middleton, on January 4, 2008, when he was hired as assistant head coach for Duke and their offensive coordinator and quarterbacks coach, Major Applewhite, on January 16, 2008, when he was hired as running backs coach for Texas. During the following weeks, Saban named former Michigan State head coach Bobby Williams as his team's new as tight ends coach and special teams coordinator, and Jim McElwain from Fresno State as the new offensive coordinator and quarterbacks coach.

Name	Position	Year at Alabama	Alma mater (year)
Nick Saban	Head coach	2nd	Kent State (1973)
Burton Burns	Associate head coach, running backs	2nd	Nebraska (1976)
Joe Pendry	Assistant head coach, head offensive coach, offensive line	2nd	West Virginia (1969)
Kirby Smart	Defense Coordinator, secondary	2nd	Georgia (1999)
Jim McElwain	Offensive coordinator, quarterbacks	1st	Eastern Washington (1984)
Kevin Steele	Associate head coach, head defensive coach, inside linebackers	2nd	Tennessee (1981)
Curt Cignetti	Wide receivers, recruiting coordinator	2nd	West Virginia (1983)
Bobby Williams	Tight ends, special teams	1st	Purdue (1982)
Bo Davis	Defensive line	2nd	LSU (1993)
Lance Thompson	Outside linebackers	2nd	The Citadel (1987)
Scott Cochran	Strength and conditioning	2nd	LSU (2001)

=== Depth chart ===
Defense

FS
Rashad Johnson
Ali Sharrief

OLB	ILB	ILB	SLB
Corey Reamer	Rolando McClain	Dont'a Hightower	⋅
Jerrell Harris	Prince Hall	Chris Jordan	⋅

SS
Justin Woodall
Mark Barron

CB
Javier Arenas
Marquis Johnson

DE	NT	DE
Bobby Greenwood	Terrence Cody	Brandon Deaderick
Lorenzo Washington	Josh Chapman	Luther Davis

CB
Kareem Jackson
Chris Rogers

Offense

WR
Mike McCoy
Darius Hanks

WR
Marquis Maze
Nikita Stover

LT	LG	C	RG	RT
Andre Smith	Mike Johnson	Antoine Caldwell	Marlon Davis	Drew Davis
Tyler Love	Brian Motley	Evan Cardwell	David Ross	John Michael Boswell

TE
Nick Walker
Travis McCall

WR
Julio Jones
Earl Alexander

QB
John Parker Wilson
Greg McElroy

Key reserves
RB Roy Upchurch
TE Brad Smelley

RB
Glen Coffee
Mark Ingram II

=== Recruiting class ===
Alabama's recruiting class was highlighted by seven players from the "ESPN 150": No. 2 Julio Jones (WR); No. 19 Burton Scott (ATH); No. 30 Courtney Upshaw (DE); No. 33 Tyler Love (OT); No. 99 Jerrell Harris (LB); No. 109 Mark Ingram II (RB); and No. 144 Chris Jackson (ATH). Alabama signed the No. 1 recruiting class according to both Rivals and Scout.

College recruiting
Name	Hometown	School	Height	Weight	40^{‡}	Commit date
Mark Barron; LB	Mobile, AL	St. Paul's Episcopal School	6 ft 2 in (1.88 m)	210 lb (95 kg)	4.50	Aug 24, 2007
Mark Barron; LB	Recruit ratings: Scout: Rivals: 247Sports: (80)					
Undra Billingsley; DE	Birmingham, AL	Woodlawn High School	6 ft 3 in (1.91 m)	265 lb (120 kg)	–	Mar 24, 2007
Undra Billingsley; DE	Recruit ratings: Scout: Rivals: 247Sports: (74)					
Devonta Bolton; LB	Norcross, GA	Norcross High School	6 ft 3 in (1.91 m)	220 lb (100 kg)	–	Aug 4, 2007
Devonta Bolton; LB	Recruit ratings: Scout: Rivals: 247Sports: (80)					
John Michael Boswell; OL	Northport, AL	Tuscaloosa County High School	6 ft 6 in (1.98 m)	300 lb (140 kg)	–	Apr 21, 2007
John Michael Boswell; OL	Recruit ratings: Scout: Rivals: 247Sports: (79)					
Terrence Cody; DT	Perkinston, MS	Mississippi Gulf Coast Community College	6 ft 5 in (1.96 m)	385 lb (175 kg)	5.60	Nov 29, 2007
Terrence Cody; DT	Recruit ratings: Scout: Rivals: 247Sports: (NR)					
Marcell Dareus; DT	Birmingham, AL	Huffman High School	6 ft 4 in (1.93 m)	275 lb (125 kg)	4.95	Feb 6, 2008
Marcell Dareus; DT	Recruit ratings: Scout: Rivals: 247Sports: (77)					
Robby Green; DB	River Ridge, LA	John Curtis Christian High School	6 ft 0 in (1.83 m)	170 lb (77 kg)	4.50	Dec 11, 2007
Robby Green; DB	Recruit ratings: Scout: Rivals: 247Sports: (80)					
Glenn Harbin; DE	Mobile, AL	McGill-Toolen Catholic High School	6 ft 6 in (1.98 m)	252 lb (114 kg)	4.80	Jan 30, 2008
Glenn Harbin; DE	Recruit ratings: Scout: Rivals: 247Sports: (77)					
Jerrell Harris; LB	Gadsden, AL	Gadsden City High School	6 ft 3 in (1.91 m)	215 lb (98 kg)	4.50	Feb 6, 2008
Jerrell Harris; LB	Recruit ratings: Scout: Rivals: 247Sports: (81)					
Dont'a Hightower; DE	Lewisburg, TN	Marshall County High School	6 ft 2 in (1.88 m)	245 lb (111 kg)	4.70	Nov 14, 2007
Dont'a Hightower; DE	Recruit ratings: Scout: Rivals: 247Sports: (79)					
Destin Hood; WR	Mobile, AL	St. Paul's Episcopal School	6 ft 2 in (1.88 m)	182 lb (83 kg)	4.50	Aug 6, 2007
Destin Hood; WR	Recruit ratings: Scout: Rivals: 247Sports: (80)					
Mark Ingram II; RB	Flint, MI	Flint Southwestern Academy	5 ft 10 in (1.78 m)	202 lb (92 kg)	4.45	Feb 5, 2008
Mark Ingram II; RB	Recruit ratings: Scout: Rivals: 247Sports: (81)					
Chris Jackson; WR	McDonough, GA	Henry County High School	6 ft 1 in (1.85 m)	190 lb (86 kg)	–	Dec 18, 2007
Chris Jackson; WR	Recruit ratings: Scout: Rivals: 247Sports: (80)					
Star Jackson; QB	Lake Worth, FL	Lake Worth Community High School	6 ft 3 in (1.91 m)	205 lb (93 kg)	4.50	Sep 4, 2007
Star Jackson; QB	Recruit ratings: Scout: Rivals: 247Sports: (79)					
Barrett Jones; OT	Cordova, TN	Evangelical Christian School	6 ft 5 in (1.96 m)	270 lb (120 kg)	–	Nov 6, 2007
Barrett Jones; OT	Recruit ratings: Scout: Rivals: 247Sports: (78)					
Julio Jones; WR	Foley, AL	Foley High School	6 ft 4 in (1.93 m)	212 lb (96 kg)	4.50	Feb 6, 2008
Julio Jones; WR	Recruit ratings: Scout: Rivals: 247Sports: (95)					
Chris Jordan; RB	Brentwood, TN	Brentwood Academy	6 ft 2 in (1.88 m)	208 lb (94 kg)	4.50	Dec 9, 2007
Chris Jordan; RB	Recruit ratings: Scout: Rivals: 247Sports: (80)					
Alonzo Lawrence; CB	Lucedale, MS	George County High School	6 ft 0 in (1.83 m)	180 lb (82 kg)	4.45	Feb 1, 2008
Alonzo Lawrence; CB	Recruit ratings: Scout: Rivals: 247Sports: (80)					
Robert Lester; S	Foley, AL	Foley High School	6 ft 2 in (1.88 m)	205 lb (93 kg)	4.58	Oct 12, 2007
Robert Lester; S	Recruit ratings: Scout: Rivals: 247Sports: (77)					
Brandon Lewis; DE	Pleasant Grove, AL	Pleasant Grove High School	6 ft 3 in (1.91 m)	260 lb (120 kg)	–	Mar 5, 2007
Brandon Lewis; DE	Recruit ratings: Scout: Rivals: 247Sports: (79)					
Tyler Love; OT	Mountain Brook, AL	Mountain Brook High School	6 ft 8 in (2.03 m)	285 lb (129 kg)	–	Jul 27, 2007
Tyler Love; OT	Recruit ratings: Scout: Rivals: 247Sports: (83)					
Ivan Matchett; RB	Mobile, AL	St. Paul's Episcopal School	5 ft 10 in (1.78 m)	205 lb (93 kg)	4.60	Mar 27, 2007
Ivan Matchett; RB	Recruit ratings: Scout: Rivals: 247Sports: (79)					
Kerry Murphy; DT	Chatham, VA	Hargrave Military Academy	6 ft 4 in (1.93 m)	300 lb (140 kg)	–	Jan 13, 2006
Kerry Murphy; DT	Recruit ratings: Scout: Rivals: 247Sports: (81)					
Wesley Neighbors; S	Huntsville, AL	Huntsville High School	6 ft 1 in (1.85 m)	190 lb (86 kg)	–	Apr 2, 2007
Wesley Neighbors; S	Recruit ratings: Scout: Rivals: 247Sports: (78)					
Jermaine Preyear; RB	Mobile, AL	W.P. Davidson High School	5 ft 11 in (1.80 m)	195 lb (88 kg)	–	Mar 2, 2007
Jermaine Preyear; RB	Recruit ratings: Scout: Rivals: 247Sports: (77)					
Melvin Ray; WR	Tallahassee, FL	North Florida Christian High School	6 ft 3 in (1.91 m)	202 lb (92 kg)	4.55	Jul 28, 2007
Melvin Ray; WR	Recruit ratings: Scout: Rivals: 247Sports: (80)					
B. J. Scott; CB	Prichard, AL	Vigor High School	5 ft 10 in (1.78 m)	190 lb (86 kg)	4.40	Jul 30, 2007
B. J. Scott; CB	Recruit ratings: Scout: Rivals: 247Sports: (84)					
Brad Smelley; WR	Tuscaloosa, AL	American Christian Academy	6 ft 3 in (1.91 m)	215 lb (98 kg)	–	May 6, 2007
Brad Smelley; WR	Recruit ratings: Scout: Rivals: 247Sports: (77)					
Corey Smith; K	Bunker Hill, WV	Musselman High School	6 ft 0 in (1.83 m)	190 lb (86 kg)	–	Mar 24, 2007
Corey Smith; K	Recruit ratings: Scout: Rivals: 247Sports: (75)					
Damion Square; LB	Houston, TX	Yates High School	6 ft 3 in (1.91 m)	268 lb (122 kg)	4.70	Aug 11, 2007
Damion Square; LB	Recruit ratings: Scout: Rivals: 247Sports: (79)					
Courtney Upshaw; DE	Eufaula, AL	Eufaula High School	6 ft 3 in (1.91 m)	240 lb (110 kg)	–	Jun 7, 2007
Courtney Upshaw; DE	Recruit ratings: Scout: Rivals: 247Sports: (83)					
Michael Williams; DE	Reform, AL	Pickens County High School	6 ft 6 in (1.98 m)	270 lb (120 kg)	4.70	Feb 16, 2007
Michael Williams; DE	Recruit ratings: Scout: Rivals: 247Sports: (79)					
Overall recruit ranking: Scout: 1 Rivals: 1 ESPN: 3
‡ Refers to 40-yard dash; Note: In many cases, Scout, Rivals, 247Sports, On3, and ESPN may conflict in their listings of height, weight and 40 time.; In these cases, the average was taken. ESPN grades are on a 100-point scale.; Sources: "Alabama Signee List 2008". Rivals.; "Scout.com Football Recruiting: Alabama". Scout.; "2008 Player Signees- Alabama". ESPN.; "Scout.com Team Recruiting Rankings". Scout.; "2008 Team Ranking". Rivals.com.

== Statistics ==
On the defensive side of the ball, of the 119 FBS teams, the Crimson Tide was ranked near the top of all major defensive categories nationally and in conference. Nationally, they ranked 2nd in rushing defense (74.14 yards per game), tied for 3rd in total defense (263.50 yards per game), 7th in scoring defense (14.29 points per game) and 30th in passing defense (189.36 yards per game). In conference, they ranked 1st in rushing and total defense, 2nd in scoring defense and 7th in passing defense. Individually, Rolando McClain led the team with 95 total tackles, 47 of which were assisted, and 48 solo tackles. McClain was also tied for 12th in conference and 1st on the team with 12 tackles for loss. Bobby Greenwood was 17th in conference and 1st on the team with 5 quarterback sacks. Rashad Johnson was tied for 37th nationally, 6th in conference and 1st on the team with 5 of Alabama's 15 total interceptions of the season.

On offense, of the 119 FBS teams, Alabama ranked 30th in rushing offense (184.64 yards per game), 35th in scoring offense (30.14 points per game), 63rd in total offense (355.79 yards per game) and 97th in passing offense (171.14 yards per game). In conference, they ranked 3rd in rushing offense, 5th in scoring offense, 6th in total offense and 9th in passing offense. John Parker Wilson led the team in passing offense and completed 187 of 323 passes for 2,273 passing yards and 10 touchdowns. Julio Jones led the team with 58 receptions for 924 yards and 4 touchdown receptions. Glen Coffee led the team with 233 rushing attempts for 1,383 yards and Mark Ingram II led the team with 12 touchdown runs.

== Awards ==
=== Conference ===
Following the loss in the SEC Championship Game, the conference named its award winners. Nick Saban was named SEC Coach of the Year and Julio Jones was named SEC Freshman of the Year. Andre Smith, Rashad Johnson, Antoine Caldwell, Glen Coffee, Terrence Cody and Rolando McClain were named to the AP All-SEC First Team. Mike Johnson, Julio Jones and Javier Arenas were named to the AP All-SEC Second Team. Five players were named to the Coaches' All-SEC First Team, including Caldwell, Cody, Rashad Johnson, McClain and Andre Smith. Arenas (as both a cornerback and kick returner), Coffee, Mike Johnson and Jones were named to the Coaches' All-SEC Second Team. Julio Jones, Mark Ingram II, Dont'a Hightower and John Michael Boswell were named to the 2008 Freshman All-SEC Team.

=== National ===
After the season, a number of Alabama players were named as national award winners and finalists. Andre Smith became Alabama's second Outland Trophy winner as the best interior lineman by the Football Writers Association of America. Smith was also a finalist for the Lombardi Award and Antoine Caldwell was a finalist for the Rimington Trophy. Nick Saban captured several coach of the year awards that included: the AP Coach of the Year, the Eddie Robinson Coach of the Year, the Home Depot Coach of the Year, the Liberty Mutual Coach of the Year Award, the Sporting News College Football Coach of the Year and the Walter Camp Coach of the Year.

In addition to the individual awards, several players were also named to various national All-American Teams. Andre Smith, Antoine Caldwell and Terrence Cody were named to the AP All-American First Team; Rashad Johnson was named to the AP All-American Second Team; and Rolando McClain was named to the AP All-American Third Team. Andre Smith was named to the Walter Camp All-American First Team. Andre Smith, Caldwell, Cody and Rashad Johnson were named to the AFCA All-America Team.

== After the season ==
In the week following the Sugar Bowl loss, several changes were made to the Alabama coaching staff. Alabama lost their defensive head coach, Kevin Steele, on January 10, 2009, when he was hired as defensive coordinator for Clemson, and their linebacker coach Lance Thompson on January 16, when he was hired as linebacker coach by Tennessee. The following week, Saban named Sal Sunseri from the NFL's Carolina Panthers as his team's new assistant head and linebacker coach, and James Willis from Auburn as the new associate head and linebacker coach. As part of the A-Day celebrations on April 18, the 2008 team captains John Parker Wilson, Rashad Johnson and Antoine Caldwell were honored at the Walk of Fame ceremony at the base of Denny Chimes.

=== NFL draft ===
In the spring that followed the 2008 season, Alabama had four players selected in the 2009 NFL draft. The first round selection was Andre Smith (6th Cincinnati Bengals); and the third round picks were Coffee (74th San Francisco 49ers), Caldwell (77th Houston Texans) and Rashad Johnson (95th Arizona Cardinals). John Parker Wilson with the Atlanta Falcons, Bobby Greenwood with the Kansas City Chiefs, Marlon Davis with the Cleveland Browns, Nick Walker with the Minnesota Vikings and Travis McCall with the Buffalo Bills each signed as undrafted free agents. In the years that followed, an additional 22 players from the 2008 squad were drafted into the NFL.

Year	Round	Pick	Overall	Player name	Position	NFL team
2009	1	6	6	Andre Smith	Offensive tackle	Cincinnati Bengals
2009	3	10	74	Glen Coffee	Running back	San Francisco 49ers
2009	3	13	77	Antoine Caldwell	Center	Houston Texans
2009	3	31	95	Rashad Johnson	Defensive back	Arizona Cardinals
2010	1	8	8	Rolando McClain	Linebacker	Oakland Raiders
2010	1	20	20	Kareem Jackson	Cornerback	Houston Texans
2010	2	18	50	Javier Arenas	Defensive back	Kansas City Chiefs
2010	2	25	57	Terrence Cody	Defensive end	Baltimore Ravens
2010	3	34	98	Mike Johnson	Offensive guard	Atlanta Falcons
2010	7	4	211	Marquis Johnson	Defensive back	St. Louis Rams
2010	7	40	247	Brandon Deaderick	Defensive end	New England Patriots
2011	1	3	3	Marcell Dareus	Defensive tackle	Buffalo Bills
2011	1	6	6	Julio Jones	Wide receiver	Atlanta Falcons
2011	1	28	28	Mark Ingram II	Running back	New Orleans Saints
2011	7	5	208	Greg McElroy	Quarterback	New York Jets
2012	1	7	7	Mark Barron	Safety	Tampa Bay Buccaneers
2012	1	25	25	Dont'a Hightower	Linebacker	New England Patriots
2012	2	3	35	Courtney Upshaw	Linebacker	Baltimore Ravens
2012	5	1	136	Josh Chapman	Defensive tackle	Indianapolis Colts
2012	7	40	247	Brad Smelley	Tight end	Cleveland Browns
2013	4	16	113	Barrett Jones	Center	St. Louis Rams
2013	7	5	211	Michael Williams	Tight end	Detroit Lions
