= Mark Ingram II =

American football player (born 1989)

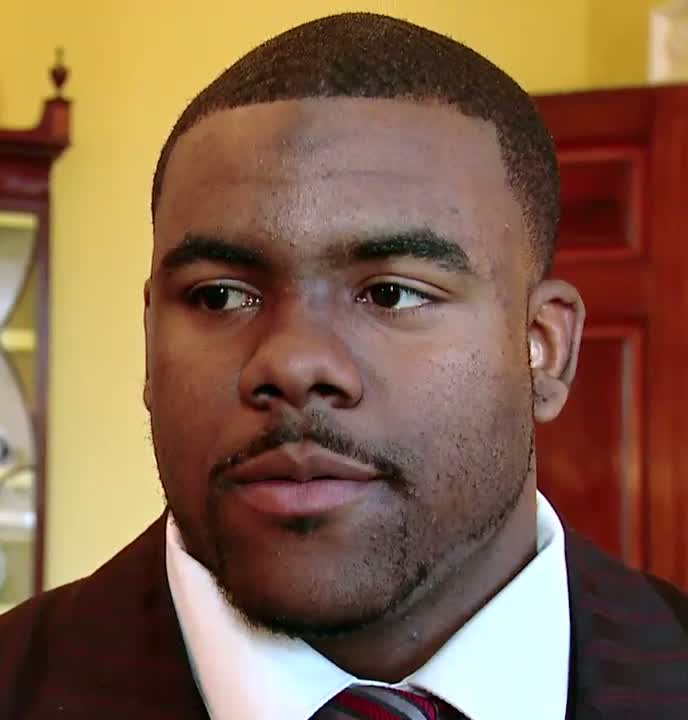
- Ingram at the White House in 2010

No. 28, 22, 21, 2, 14
- Position: Running back

Personal information
- Born: December 21, 1989 (age 36); Hackensack, New Jersey, U.S.
- Listed height: 5 ft 9 in (1.75 m)
- Listed weight: 215 lb (98 kg)

Career information
- High school: Flint Southwestern (Flint, Michigan)
- College: Alabama (2008–2010)
- NFL draft: 2011: 1st round, 28th overall pick

Career history
- New Orleans Saints (2011–2018); Baltimore Ravens (2019–2020); Houston Texans (2021); New Orleans Saints (2021–2022)

Awards and highlights
- 3× Pro Bowl (2014, 2017, 2019); BCS national champion (2009); Heisman Trophy (2009); Unanimous All-American (2009); SEC Male Athlete of the Year (2010)

Career NFL statistics
- Rushing yards: 8,111
- Rushing average: 4.5
- Rushing touchdowns: 65
- Receptions: 303
- Receiving yards: 2,125
- Receiving touchdowns: 10
- Stats at Pro Football Reference
- College Football Hall of Fame

Mark Valentino Ingram II (born December 21, 1989) is an American former professional football running back and current on-air personality for Fox Sports. He played 12 seasons in the National Football League (NFL). He played college football for the Alabama Crimson Tide, becoming the first Alabama player to win the Heisman Trophy after rushing for 1,658 yards in 2009 en route to winning the 2010 BCS National Championship Game.

Ingram was selected by the New Orleans Saints in the first round of the 2011 NFL draft. With the Saints, he earned two Pro Bowl selections and, at the time of his retirement, was their all-time leader in rushing yardage. Ingram was also a member of the Baltimore Ravens and the Houston Texans.

== Early life ==
Ingram was born in Hackensack, New Jersey, the son of former wide receiver for the New York Giants, Mark Ingram Sr. He attended Grand Blanc High School in Grand Blanc, Michigan, during his freshman, sophomore and junior years, and then Flint Southwestern Academy in Flint, Michigan, for his senior year. He was a four-year starter on his high schools' football teams, running for 2,546 yards and 38 touchdowns in his final two seasons. He was Saginaw Valley MVP, Area Player of the Year, and an All-State selection as a senior. Ingram also played defensively as a cornerback, totaling 84 tackles and eight interceptions his senior year.

In addition to football, Ingram also ran track and field at Flint, where he was nine-time All-State selection. He competed as a sprinter (PR of 10.69 seconds in the 100-meter dash and 21.90 seconds in the 200-meter dash) and long jumper (top-leap of 7.25 meters).

Considered a four-star recruit by Rivals.com, Ingram was listed as the No. 17 high school athlete in the nation in 2008.

== College career ==
Ingram received an athletic scholarship to attend the University of Alabama, where he played for coach Nick Saban's Alabama Crimson Tide football team from 2008 to 2010.

=== 2008 season ===
Ingram played behind Glen Coffee his freshman year, and he was selected to the 2008 SEC All-Freshman Team. He made his collegiate debut in the season opener against Clemson. In the victory over the Tigers, he finished with 17 carries for 96 yards. In the next game against Tulane, he recorded his first collegiate rushing touchdown on a 15-yard run. He followed that up with 51 rushing yards and two more rushing touchdowns in a victory over Western Kentucky in the next game. On November 1, against Arkansas State, he finished with 113 rushing yards and two rushing touchdowns. In the Iron Bowl, against Auburn, he finished with 64 rushing yards, two rushing touchdowns, and 27 receiving yards. In the SEC Championship against Florida, he was held to 21 rushing yards but had a rushing touchdown. In the Sugar Bowl, against Utah, he finished the season with 26 rushing yards. Overall, in the 2008 season, he finished with 728 rushing yards and 12 rushing touchdowns. His team-high 12 touchdowns also set the Alabama freshman school record.

=== 2009 season ===
In the season opener of the 2009–10 season (Chick-fil-A Kickoff Game: #5 Alabama against #7 Virginia Tech), Ingram was the player of the game with 150 rushing yards, a rushing touchdown, and a receiving touchdown.

On October 3, against Kentucky, he had 140 rushing yards and two touchdowns. On October 10, against Ole Miss, he finished with 172 rushing yards and a touchdown. On October 17, in a game against South Carolina, Ingram ran for a career-high 246 yards. He was named SEC Offensive Player of the Week. On November 7, against LSU, he finished with 22 carries for 144 rushing yards. In the next game, against Mississippi State, he finished with 149 rushing yards and two touchdowns.

In the 2009 SEC Championship Game versus the undefeated and top-ranked Florida Gators, Ingram rushed for 113 yards and three touchdowns, while also catching two passes for 76 receiving yards to combine for 189 all-purpose yards. In the game, Ingram also surpassed Bobby Humphrey's single-season rushing record for the Crimson Tide, reaching 1,542 rushing yards for the season.

On December 12, Ingram won the Heisman Trophy in the closest vote in the award's 75-year history. He edged out Toby Gerhart by 28 votes. Ingram was Alabama's first Heisman winner, the third consecutive sophomore to win the award, and the first running back to win the award since Reggie Bush. At the time, Ingram was nine days shy of his twentieth birthday, making him the youngest player to win the Heisman. Ingram was recognized as a unanimous first-team All-American, having received first-team honors from the Associated Press, American Football Coaches Association, Football Writers Association of America, Sporting News, and Walter Camp Football Foundation.

On January 7, 2010, Alabama defeated Texas 37–21 to win the BCS National Championship. Ingram received honors as Offensive MVP after rushing for 116 yards and two touchdowns on 22 carries. For the 2009 season, Ingram rushed for 1,658 yards and 17 touchdowns, and also had 334 receiving yards with 3 touchdowns.

=== 2010 season ===
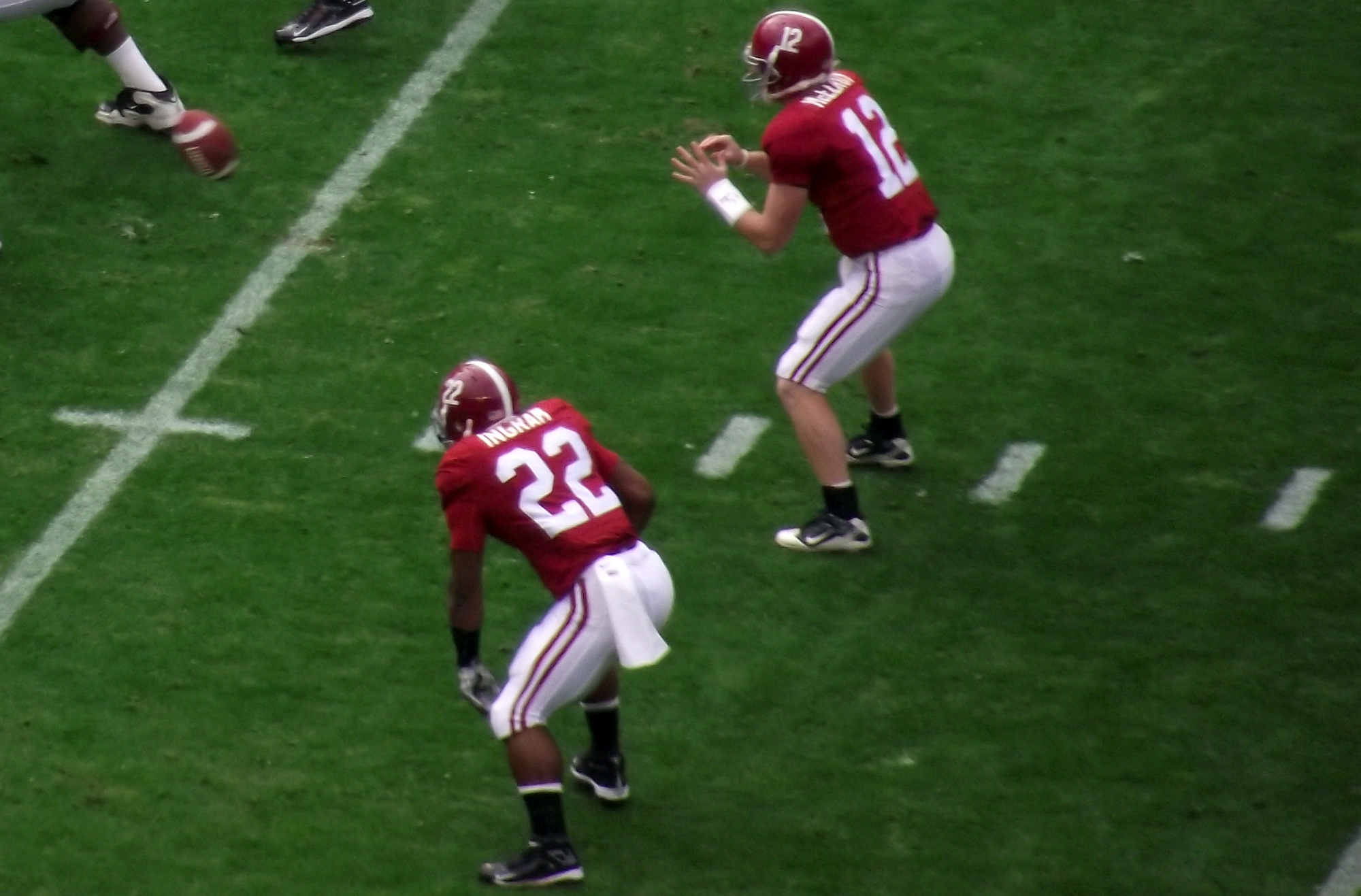
Ingram (#22) next to quarterback Greg McElroy (#12)

Ingram was ruled out for the season opener after undergoing minor knee surgery the week prior to the opening game against San Jose State. Sophomore running back Trent Richardson filled in for Ingram for the first two games, after it was announced that the junior was not likely to play against Penn State on September 11. He eventually made his season debut in a road game against Duke, rushing for 151 yards on nine carries, including two touchdowns in the first quarter, as Alabama routed the Blue Devils 62–13.

After a 3–0 start, Alabama traveled to Fayetteville, Arkansas, to face the Arkansas Razorbacks in the conference opener for the Crimson Tide. Ingram and the Alabama offense came back from a 20–7 third quarter deficit to take a 24–20 lead with just over three minutes remaining, when Ingram capped a short, 12-yard drive with a one-yard touchdown run. Ingram finished with 157 yards on 21 attempts and two touchdowns. He did not break 100 yards again during the regular season. On October 9, Alabama suffered their first loss since the 2009 Sugar Bowl when the team fell 35–21 to South Carolina in Williams-Brice Stadium. Ingram was held to a season-low 41 yards on 11 carries in the loss. In his final collegiate game, he finished with 59 rushing yards and two touchdowns against Michigan State in the Capitol One Bowl.

Ingram finished his junior season with 875 yards on 158 carries with 13 touchdowns, with an additional 282 yards receiving and a touchdown. On January 6, 2011, Ingram announced he would forgo his senior season and enter the 2011 NFL draft. At the time of the announcement, he was projected as a first round pick. On April 19, 2011, Ingram was voted by fans to be on the Cover of NCAA Football 12 On PlayStation 3 and Xbox 360.

On January 14, 2026, Ingram was inducted into the College Football Hall of Fame.

== Professional career ==
Pre-draft measurables
Height	Weight	Arm length	Hand span	Wingspan	40-yard dash	10-yard split	20-yard split	20-yard shuttle	Three-cone drill	Vertical jump	Broad jump	Bench press
5 ft 9 1/8 in (1.76 m)	215 lb (98 kg)	30 3/4 in (0.78 m)	9 1/2 in (0.24 m)	6 ft 1 in (1.85 m)	4.53 s	1.54 s	2.58 s	4.62 s	7.13 s	31.5 in (0.80 m)	9 ft 10 in (3.00 m)	21 reps
All values from NFL Combine and Pro Day

=== New Orleans Saints (first stint) ===
==== 2011 season ====
The New Orleans Saints selected Ingram in the first round with the 28th pick in the 2011 NFL draft—the same pick number the Giants used to draft his father, Mark Ingram Sr., twenty-four years earlier, at the same age. Ingram was the first running back drafted in 2011; since the 1970 AFL-NFL merger, this was the latest pick used for the first running back chosen in an NFL draft. The Saints acquired the pick from the New England Patriots, trading their second-round selection (#56 overall) and their first-round selection in 2012 to do so. As Alabama head coach Nick Saban is part of Patriots head coach Bill Belichick's coaching tree, the Patriots were widely assumed to be interested in drafting Ingram themselves. On July 28, 2011, Ingram decided on the number #28 in honor of his and his father's draft pick number. The next day Ingram agreed with the Saints on a four-year contract, with three years guaranteed and a fifth year option. The contract was worth $7.41 million, with a $3.89 million signing bonus.

On August 12, 2011, Ingram scored his first career touchdown as a Saint on a 14-yard run in a preseason game against the San Francisco 49ers. On September 25, Ingram scored his first touchdown in regular season play as a Saint on a tough 13-yard run against the Houston Texans. On October 23, late in the game on Sunday Night Football in a runaway win against the Indianapolis Colts Ingram injured his heel. It was considered a 'day-to-day' injury at first, but Ingram was unable to practice the entire week and missed the following game versus the winless St. Louis Rams which ended in a 31–21 loss for the Saints. He returned to action against the Atlanta Falcons on November 13. On November 28, against the New York Giants, he finished with 80 rushing yards and a touchdown. In his final action of the 2011 season on December 4, he finished with 54 rushing yards and a touchdown against the Detroit Lions. He suffered a toe injury and missed the remainder of the season. He finished his rookie season with 474 rushing yards and five touchdowns.

==== 2012 season ====
Ingram was the Saints' leading rusher for the 2012 season, sharing the backfield with Pierre Thomas, Darren Sproles, and Chris Ivory. Early in the season, Ingram was part of a more balanced backfield but starting in Week 10, he earned significantly more carries. Overall, in the 2012 season, he finished with 602 rushing yards and five rushing touchdowns.

==== 2013 season ====
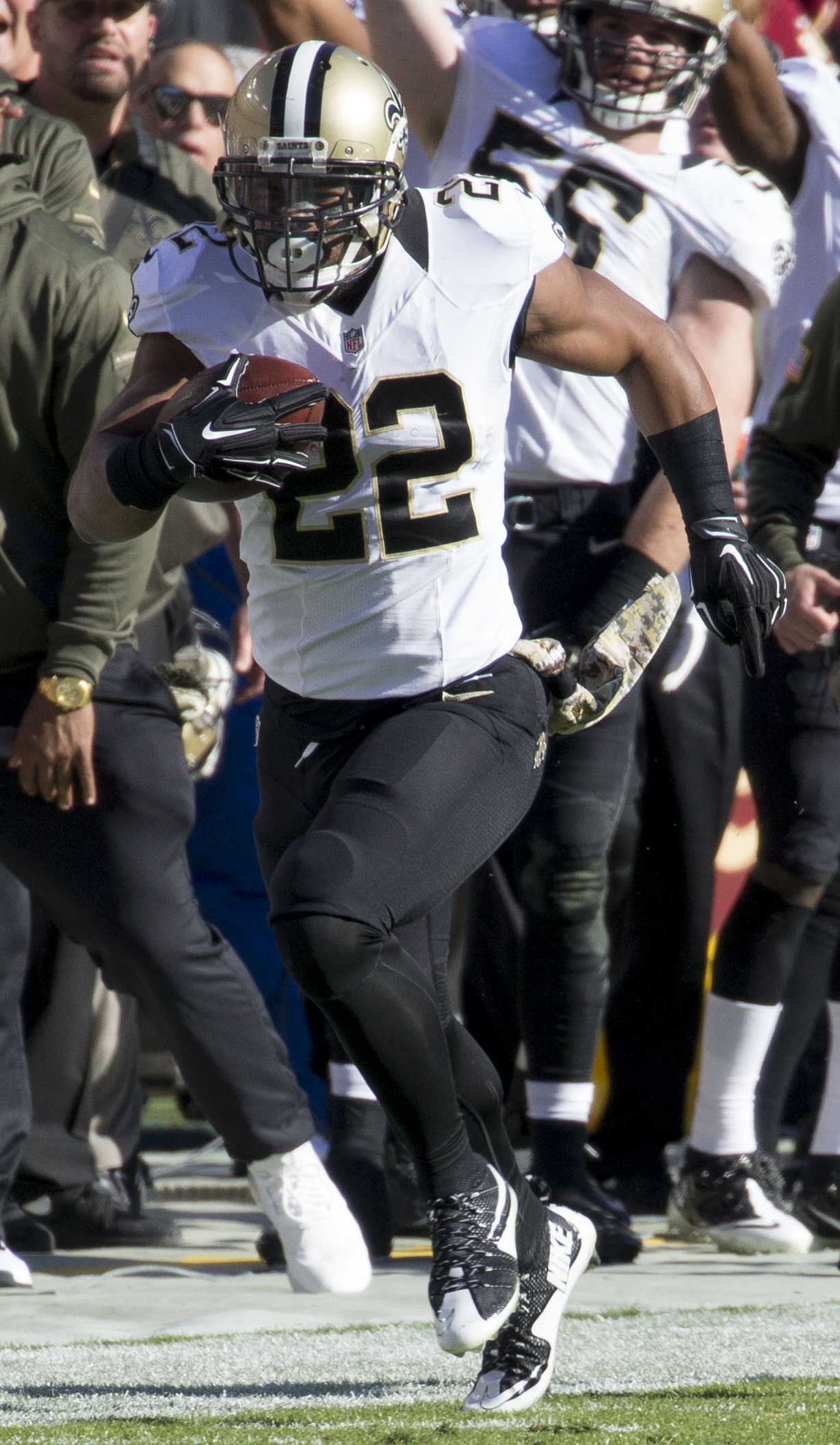
Ingram in 2015

After wearing the #28 jersey for two seasons, Ingram changed to number 22, the number he wore at Alabama, before the beginning of the 2013 season. The 2013 season was one of lessened production for Ingram. He started off the season slow with only 31 combined rushing yards in the first two games. Ingram's performance was hampered by a toe injury. He returned to action on November 3, but only posted 19 rushing yards against the New York Jets. In the next game, a 49–17 win over the Dallas Cowboys, he had a career day with 145 rushing yards and a touchdown. Over the remainder of the season, he eclipsed 50 rushing yards only once, against the Carolina Panthers. Overall, in the 2013 season, he finished with 386 rushing yards and one rushing touchdown. The Saints qualified for the playoffs in the 2013 season. In the Wild Card Round against the Philadelphia Eagles, he finished with 97 rushing yards, one rushing touchdown, and 17 receiving yards in the 26–24 victory. In the Divisional Round against the Seattle Seahawks, he finished with 49 rushing yards in the 23–15 loss.

==== 2014 season ====
In the season opener, against the Atlanta Falcons, he finished with 60 rushing yards and two rushing touchdowns in the 37–34 overtime loss. In the next game, a 26–24 loss to the Cleveland Browns, he finished with 83 rushing yards and his third rushing touchdown of the season. On October 26, Ingram ran for a career-high 172 yards on 24 carries and added one touchdown as the Saints defeated the Green Bay Packers 44–23. With his 30-carry, 100-yard and two-touchdown performance against the Carolina Panthers in the Saints' next game, Ingram became the first Saint since Deuce McAllister in 2006 to rush for over 100 yards in consecutive games. In the next game against the San Francisco 49ers, he finished with 120 rushing yards. In Week 13, he had 122 rushing yards against the Pittsburgh Steelers. In the last three games of the regular season, he finished with a rushing touchdown in each game. He finished the 2014 NFL season with a career-high 1,109 yards from scrimmage (964 rushing yards and 145 receiving yards). He earned his first career Pro Bowl nomination.

==== 2015 season ====
On March 7, 2015, Ingram and the Saints agreed to a four-year deal worth $16 million. In the season opener against the Arizona Cardinals, he was held to 24 rushing yards but had eight receptions for 98 receiving yards in the 31–19 loss. In Week 4, against the Dallas Cowboys, he had 128 scrimmage yards in the 26–20 victory. On October 15, against the Atlanta Falcons, he finished with 46 rushing yards and two rushing touchdowns. In the next game, a 27–21 victory over the Indianapolis Colts, he had his most productive game of the season with 143 rushing yards and a touchdown. On November 15, Ingram injured his shoulder in the Week 10 loss to the Washington Redskins. Ingram's shoulder injury sidelined him in the season's final four games. He finished the 2015 season with 769 rushing yards, six rushing touchdowns, and 405 receiving yards.

==== 2016 season ====
In the 2016 season, Ingram shared the backfield with Tim Hightower but had a majority of the backfield carries. On November 6, against the San Francisco 49ers, he finished with 158 rushing yards and a touchdown in Week 9. In Week 12, Ingram ran for 146 yards on 14 attempts and a touchdown along with one catch for 21 yards for a touchdown in a 49–21 win against the Los Angeles Rams, earning him NFC Offensive Player of the Week. Five weeks later, against the Atlanta Falcons, Ingram rushed for 103 yards on 20 attempts becoming the Saints' first 1,000 yard rusher since Deuce McAllister in 2006 over a decade earlier. He finished the season with 1,043 rushing yards and added an additional 319 receiving yards to go along with 10 total touchdowns. Ingram's 5.1 yards per attempt ranked ninth among NFL running backs in 2016.

==== 2017 season ====
Ingram began the 2017 season sharing carries with former Vikings star Adrian Peterson and rookie Alvin Kamara, but became the team's first-option rusher in Week 3. After averaging just 42 yards a game through the first four, after the Saints' bye week Ingram had consecutive 100+ yard games against Detroit and Green Bay in Weeks 6 and 7, including his first three touchdowns of the season. In Week 10, he led the NFL with 131 rushing yards and his first career game with three touchdowns in an emphatic 47–10 victory over Buffalo, moving him into a three-way tie for the league lead in rushing touchdowns at seven with Ezekiel Elliott and Todd Gurley. In Week 11, he again led the NFL with 134 rushing yards and a touchdown on just 11 carries in a 34–31 overtime win over Washington, earning him NFC Offensive Player of the Week. In Week 13, he recorded 85 yards rushing and scored his NFL-leading ninth rushing touchdown (trailing only teammate Kamara and Todd Gurley for the lead in total touchdowns; they had 11 each). On December 19, 2017, Ingram was named to his second Pro Bowl alongside Kamara, becoming the first ever pair of running backs from the same team to earn the honors. He finished the regular season with career-highs of 1,124 rushing yards, 12 rushing touchdowns, 58 receptions, and 416 receiving yards. He finished sixth in the league in rushing yards, and second in rushing touchdowns behind Todd Gurley. Ingram and Kamara became the first running back duo in NFL history to each have over 1,500 scrimmage yards in the same season. The Saints won the NFC South in the 2017 season. In the Wild Card Round, against the Carolina Panthers, Ingram finished with 22 rushing yards and 13 receiving yards in the 31–26 victory. In the Divisional Round against the Minnesota Vikings, he finished with 25 rushing yards in the 29–24 loss. He was ranked 43rd by his fellow players on the NFL Top 100 Players of 2018.

==== 2018 season and PED suspension ====
On May 8, 2018, Ingram was suspended for the first four games of the season due to violating the policy on performance-enhancing drugs. He returned in Week 5 and recorded 53 rushing yards and two rushing touchdowns in the 43–19 victory over the Washington Redskins. In Week 10 against the Cincinnati Bengals, he had 104 rushing yards, 58 receiving yards, and a receiving touchdown in the 51–14 victory. In Week 11, against the Philadelphia Eagles, he had 103 rushing yards and two rushing touchdowns. In Week 16 against the Pittsburgh Steelers, Ingram recorded his 50th touchdown, surpassing Deuce McAllister for the Saints franchise record for rushing touchdowns. Overall, in the 2018 season, Ingram had 645 rushing yards and six rushing touchdowns to go along with 21 receptions for 170 receiving yards and one receiving touchdown. The Saints won the NFC South and had home-field advantage throughout the NFC Playoffs as the #1-seed. In the Divisional Round against the Philadelphia Eagles, Ingram had 53 rushing yards in the 20–14 victory. In the NFC Championship against the Los Angeles Rams, he had 31 rushing yards in the 26–23 overtime loss. He was ranked 80th by his fellow players on the NFL Top 100 Players of 2019.

=== Baltimore Ravens ===
==== 2019 season ====
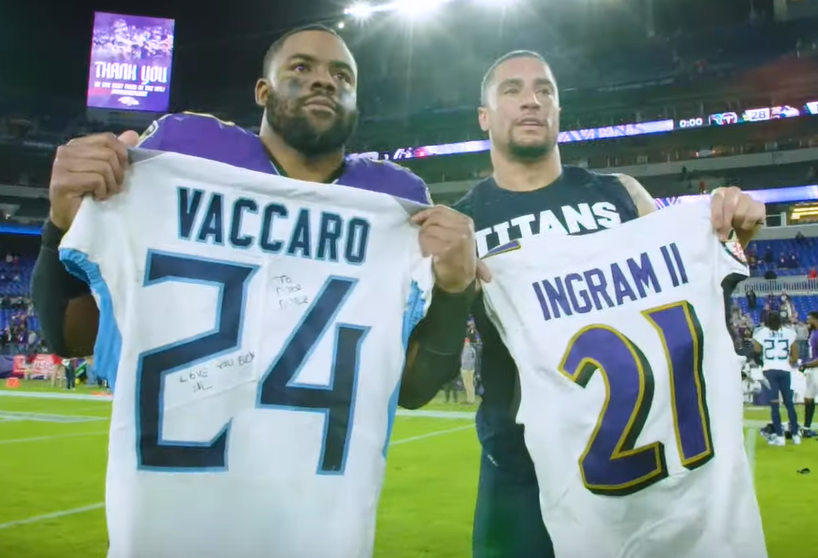
Ingram (left) alongside Kenny Vaccaro in the AFC Divisional Round of the playoffs

On March 13, 2019, Ingram signed a three-year, $15 million contract with the Baltimore Ravens. Ingram made his debut with the Ravens in Week 1 against the Miami Dolphins. In the game, Ingram rushed 14 times for 107 yards and two touchdowns as the Ravens won 59–10. In Week 3 against the Kansas City Chiefs, Ingram rushed 16 times for 103 yards and three touchdowns as the Ravens lost 33–28. In Week 9 against the New England Patriots, Ingram rushed 15 times for 115 yards and caught two passes for 29 yards in the 37–20 win. In Week 11 against the Houston Texans, Ingram rushed 13 times for 48 yards and caught three passes for 37 yards and two touchdowns in the 41–7 win. In Week 12 against the Los Angeles Rams, Ingram rushed 15 times for 111 yards and a touchdown and caught one pass for a seven-yard touchdown in the 45–6 win. In Week 16 against the Cleveland Browns, Ingram rushed eight times for 55 yards and caught two passes for 36 yards and a touchdown before exiting the game due to a calf injury. Without Ingram, the Ravens won 31–15. During the game, Ingram surpassed 1,000 rushing yards on the season. On the season, Ingram finished with 1,018 rushing yards and ten rushing touchdowns to go along with 26 receptions for 247 receiving yards and five receiving touchdowns. He earned his third Pro Bowl nomination for his accomplishments in the 2019 season. He was ranked 44th by his fellow players on the NFL Top 100 Players of 2020.

==== 2020 season ====
In Week 2 against the Houston Texans, Ingram rushed nine times for 55 yards and his first rushing touchdown of the season during the 33–16 win. He was placed on the reserve/COVID-19 list by the team on November 23, 2020, and activated on December 5. Despite this, his playing time became increasingly limited behind rookie J. K. Dobbins, Gus Edwards, and Justice Hill. After playing only one snap in Week 14 against the Cleveland Browns, Ingram was a healthy scratch for Weeks 15 and 16 before entering in a backup role in Week 17 against the Cincinnati Bengals, which ended up being his final game as a Raven. Overall, Ingram finished the 2020 season with 72 carries for 299 rushing yards and two rushing touchdowns in 11 games. On January 19, 2021, Ingram was waived by the Ravens.

=== Houston Texans ===
On March 24, 2021, Ingram signed a one-year contract with the Houston Texans for $2.5 million including a $500,000 signing bonus.

=== New Orleans Saints (second stint) ===
On October 29, 2021, Ingram was traded back to the Saints in exchange for a 2024 seventh-round pick. Ingram became the New Orleans Saints' all-time rushing yards leader in the 2021 NFL season in Week 10, against the Tennessee Titans, surpassing the previous record holder, Deuce McAllister. He finished the 2021 season with 160 carries for 554 rushing yards and two rushing touchdowns to go along with 27 receptions for 162 receiving yards.

On October 31, 2022, it was announced that Ingram would miss 3–4 weeks after suffering a grade 2 MCL sprain against the Las Vegas Raiders in Week 8. He was placed on injured reserve on December 14. In the 2022 season, Ingram appeared in ten games and started three. He finished with 62 carries for 233 rushing yards and one rushing touchdown.

== Career statistics ==
=== NFL ===
==== Regular season ====
Year	Team	Games		Rushing					Receiving					Fumbles	
Year	Team	GP	GS	Att	Yds	Avg	Lng	TD	Rec	Yds	Avg	Lng	TD	Fum	Lost
2011	NO	10	4	122	474	3.9	35T	5	11	46	4.2	9	0	1	1
2012	NO	16	5	156	602	3.9	31	5	6	29	4.8	16	0	0	0
2013	NO	11	3	78	386	4.9	34	1	7	68	9.7	23	0	0	0
2014	NO	13	9	226	964	4.3	31	9	29	145	5.0	14	0	3	1
2015	NO	12	10	166	769	4.6	70	6	50	405	8.1	59	0	2	1
2016	NO	16	14	205	1,043	5.1	75T	6	46	319	6.9	22	4	2	2
2017	NO	16	13	230	1,124	4.9	72	12	58	416	7.2	54	0	3	3
2018	NO	12	6	138	645	4.7	38	6	21	170	8.1	28T	1	3	1
2019	BAL	15	15	202	1,018	5.0	53	10	26	247	9.5	25T	5	2	2
2020	BAL	11	9	72	299	4.2	30	2	6	50	8.3	18	0	0	0
2021	HOU	7	7	92	294	3.2	24	1	7	24	3.4	10	0	0	0
2021	NO	7	3	68	260	3.8	28	1	20	138	6.9	34	0	1	1
2022	NO	10	3	62	233	3.8	14	1	16	68	4.3	11	0	2	2
Career		156	100	1,817	8,111	4.5	75	65	303	2,125	7.0	59	10	19	14

==== Postseason ====
Year	Team	Games		Rushing					Receiving					Fumbles	
Year	Team	GP	GS	Att	Yds	Avg	Lng	TD	Rec	Yds	Avg	Lng	TD	Fum	Lost
2013	NO	2	1	28	146	5.2	18	1	3	17	5.7	11	0	1	1
2017	NO	2	1	19	47	2.5	9	0	2	16	8.0	13	0	0	0
2018	NO	2	1	18	84	4.7	36	0	4	15	3.8	8	0	0	0
2019	BAL	1	1	6	22	3.7	7	0	1	9	9.0	9	0	0	0
Career		7	4	71	299	4.2	36	1	10	57	5.7	13	0	1	1

=== College ===
Season	Team	Games		Rushing								Receiving						Kick returns				
Season	Team	GP	GS	Att	Yds	Loss	Net	Avg	Lng	TD	Y/G	Rec	Yds	Avg	Lng	TD	Y/G	Ret	Yds	Avg	Lng	TD
2008	Alabama	14	0	143	743	15	728	5.1	40	12	52.0	7	54	7.7	27	0	3.9	1	26	26.0	26	0
2009	Alabama	14	13	271	1,678	20	1,658	6.1	70	17	118.4	32	334	10.4	69	3	23.9	0	0	0.0	0	0
2010	Alabama	13	11	158	903	28	875	5.5	54	13	67.3	21	282	13.4	78	1	21.7	1	19	19.0	19	0
Career		41	24	572	3,324	63	3,261	5.7	70	42	84.3	60	670	11.2	78	4	17.2	2	45	22.5	26	0

== Awards and honors ==
NFL

- 3× Pro Bowl (2014, 2017, 2019)
- 3× NFL Top 100 — 43rd (2018), 80th (2019), 44th (2020)

College

- BCS national champion (2009)
- Heisman Trophy (2009)
- SN Player of the Year (2009)
- Unanimous All-American (2009)
- SEC Male Athlete of the Year (2010)
- SEC co-Offensive Player of the Year (2009)
- First-team All-SEC (2009)
- Second-team All-SEC (2010)

== Broadcasting career ==
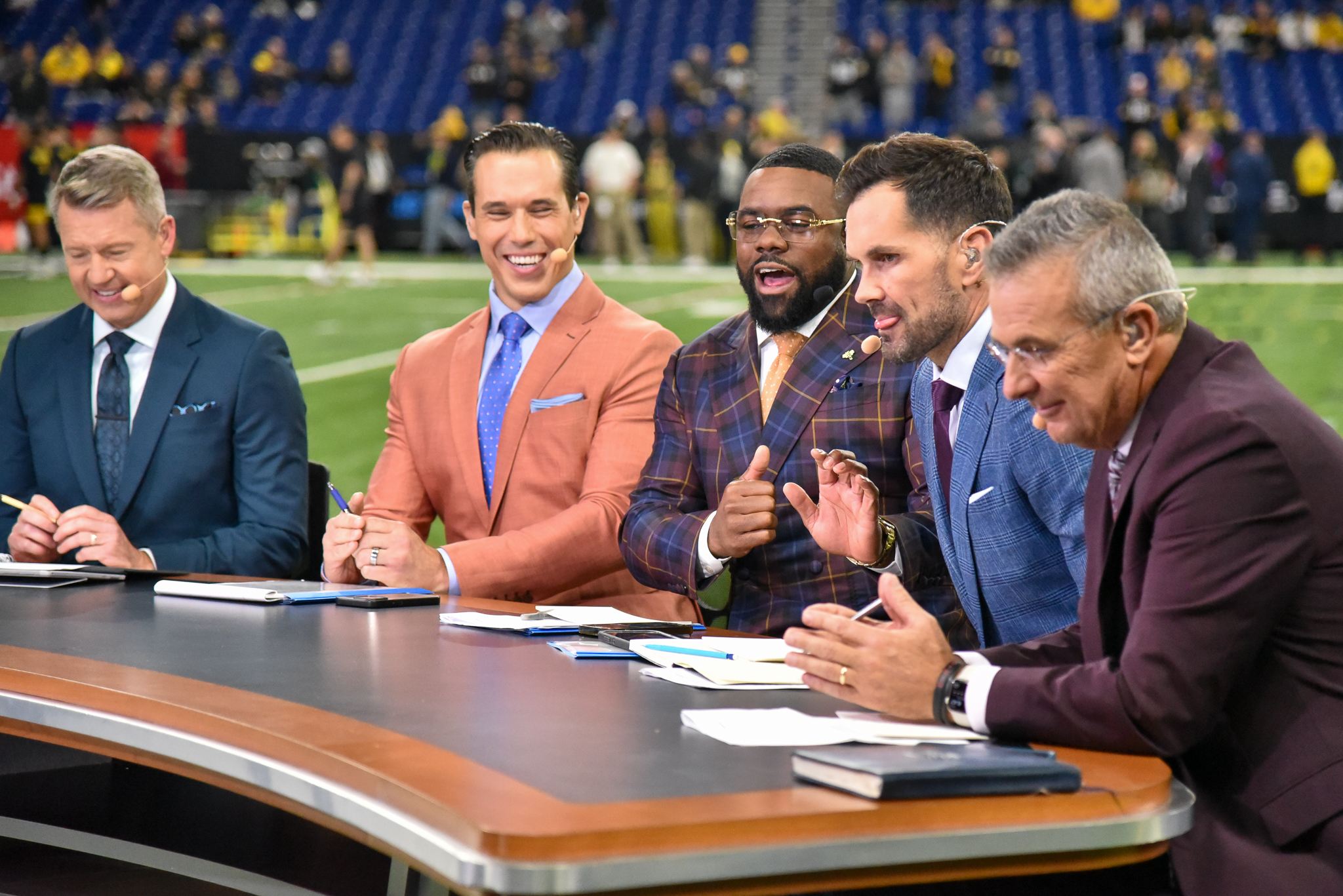
Ingram (center) with Fox Sports at the 2023 Big Ten Football Championship Game

On July 6, 2023, Ingram announced his retirement from playing football along with his decision to join Fox Sports' Big Noon Kickoff show.

== Business venture ==
=== D.C. United Ownership ===
On June 4, 2021, it was reported that Ingram joined D.C. United's ownership group as an investor.

== Personal life ==
Ingram has a son, Mark Ingram III. Before announcing a Ravens selection in Round 2 of the 2026 NFL draft in Pittsburgh, Ingram II had a message for the crowd: "Steelers still suck!" Afterwards, the crowd booed and Ingram said "Hey, we about that! You got a problem with that, come see me! Big Truss! Flock Nation in the flesh!" In December 2026 Ingram II will be inducted into the Michigan Sports Hall of Fame.
