= Marquis Johnson =

American football player (born 1988)

No. 25
- Position: Cornerback

Personal information
- Born: May 18, 1988 (age 38); Orlando, Florida, U.S.
- Listed height: 5 ft 10 in (1.78 m)
- Listed weight: 192 lb (87 kg)

Career information
- High school: Booker (Sarasota, Florida)
- College: Alabama
- NFL draft: 2010: 7th round, 211th overall pick

Career history
- St. Louis Rams (2010–2011); New Orleans Saints (2012)*
- * Offseason or practice squad member only

Awards and highlights
- BCS national champion (2010)

Career NFL statistics
- Total tackles: 7
- Pass deflections: 3
- Stats at Pro Football Reference

Marquis Adrian Johnson (born May 18, 1988) is an American former professional football player who was a cornerback in the National Football League (NFL). He was selected in the seventh round of the 2010 NFL draft. Johnson played college football for the Alabama Crimson Tide, winning a national championship in 2009.

== Early life ==
Johnson played for Booker High School in Sarasota, Florida, leading his team to a 13-2 record as a senior, had five interceptions, 15 pass breakups and 39 solo tackles. He also returned punts, averaging 37.6 yards per return. He was named All-State as a cornerback and punt returner. As a junior, he registered 50 tackles and 11 pass break-ups. He was a three-sport star, playing on a state-champion basketball team in addition to competing in the triple jump in the Florida state track & field championships.

== College career ==
As a senior at the University of Alabama in 2009, Johnson played in all 14 games, starting 10. He finished the season with 29 total tackles (25 solo) with one interception, and led the team with passes defensed (18) and passes broken up (17). In 2008, as a junior, Johnson served as Alabama's third cornerback in nickel and dime defensive packages. He played in all 14 games with three starts and recorded 49 tackles on the year, which ranked sixth on the team, had two interceptions, a tackle for loss and five pass breakups. In 2007, he played in nine games as a back-up in the secondary and had four tackles, one pass breakup and a fumble recovery on the season. As a freshman in 2006 he appeared in all 13 games and finished the season with seven tackles to his credit.

== Professional career ==
=== Pre-draft ===
Johnson was not invited to the NFL Combine and despite coming off meniscus surgery Johnson ran a 4.51 forty-yard dash.

=== St. Louis Rams ===
The Rams selected Johnson in the seventh round of the 2010 NFL draft with the 211th overall pick. On June 28, 2010, Johnson signed a four-year contract with the Rams. He was waived and re-signed on a number of occasions over the next 2 years, spending time on the practice squad and on the PUP list and injured reserve list as well as on the active roster. Hampered by a knee injury, he played in five games during his two years with the team. Ultimately, the Rams waived him on May 3, 2012.

=== New Orleans Saints ===
Johnson signed with the New Orleans Saints on May 10, 2012. He was released by the Saints on August 31, 2012, on the final cut down day.

== Personal life ==
Johnson was raised in Sarasota, Florida. He has spoken openly about the abuse he suffered as a child, and has become active in efforts to help other children overcome abuse.
