= Lorenzo Washington =

American football player (1986–2021)

Profile
- Position: Defensive end

Personal information
- Born: December 2, 1986; Loganville, Georgia, U.S.
- Died: February 14, 2021 (aged 34); Dallas, Texas, U.S.
- Listed height: 6 ft 4 in (1.93 m)
- Listed weight: 296 lb (134 kg)

Career information
- High school: Grayson (Loganville)
- College: Alabama
- NFL draft: 2010: undrafted

Career history
- Dallas Cowboys (2010)*; New England Patriots (2010)*; New York Jets (2011)*; Detroit Lions (2012)*
- * Offseason or practice squad member only

Awards and highlights
- BCS national champion (2010)
- Stats at Pro Football Reference

Lorenzo Washington (December 2, 1986 – February 14, 2021) was an American professional football player who was a defensive end in the National Football League (NFL). He was signed by the Dallas Cowboys as an undrafted free agent in 2010. He played college football for the Alabama Crimson Tide.

He was also a member of the New England Patriots, New York Jets and Detroit Lions.

== College career ==
A native of Loganville, Georgia, Washington attended Grayson High School before enrolling at the University of Alabama. In August 2008, head coach Nick Saban moved him from nose tackle to defensive end. Washington was a member of Alabama's 2009 national championship team.

== Professional career ==
=== Dallas Cowboys ===
After going undrafted in the 2010 NFL draft, Washington signed with the Dallas Cowboys on April 25, 2010. He was released on July 29, 2010, after a hamstring injury prevented Washington from practicing with the team.

=== New England Patriots ===
Washington was signed to the New England Patriots' practice squad on November 3, 2010. He was released on January 3, 2011.

=== New York Jets ===
Washington was signed by the New York Jets to a future contract on January 26, 2011. He was waived on September 2.

=== Detroit Lions ===
On September 2, 2012, the Detroit Lions signed Washington to their practice squad.

== Death ==
Washington died in his Dallas home of suspected carbon monoxide poisoning on February 14, 2021, aged 34.
