= List of Arkansas Razorbacks head football coaches =

The Arkansas Razorbacks college football team represents the University of Arkansas in the West Division of the Southeastern Conference (SEC). The Razorbacks compete as part of the NCAA Division I Football Bowl Subdivision. The program has had 34 head coaches, and 3 interim head coaches, since it began play during the 1894 season. Ryan Silverfield has served as head coach of the Razorbacks since November 2025.

As of the conclusion of the 2025 regular season, the team has played 1,335 games over 132 seasons. In that time, 12 coaches have led the Razorbacks in postseason bowl games: Fred Thomsen, John Barnhill, Bowden Wyatt, Frank Broyles, Lou Holtz, Ken Hatfield, Jack Crowe, Danny Ford, Houston Nutt, Reggie Herring, Bobby Petrino, and Bret Bielema. 5 coaches won conference championships: Thomsen, Wyatt, Broyles, Holtz and Hatfield won a combined ten as a member of the Southwest Conference. Frank Broyles won the Razorbacks' lone national championship in 1964.

Broyles is the leader in seasons coached and games won, with 144 victories during his 19 years with the program. Hatfield has the highest winning percentage of those who have coached more than 1 game, with .760. Chad Morris has the lowest winning percentage of those who have coached more than 1 game, with .182. Of the 31 different head coaches who have led the Razorbacks, Hugo Bezdek, Francis Schmidt, Wyatt, Broyles, and Holtz have been inducted as head coaches into the College Football Hall of Fame in Atlanta, Georgia.

== Key ==
Key to symbols in coaches list
General		Overall		Conference		Postseason (Note: Although the first Rose Bowl Game was played in 1902, it has been continuously played since the 1916 game, and is recognized as the oldest bowl game by the NCAA. "—" indicates any season prior to 1916 when postseason games were not played.)	
No.	Order of coaches (Note: A running total of the number of head coaches, with coaches who served separate tenures being counted only once. Interim head coaches are represented with "Int" and are not counted in the running total. "—" indicates the team played but either without a coach or no coach is on record. "X" indicates an interim year without play.)	GC	Games coached	CW	Conference wins	PW	Postseason wins
DC	Division championships	OW	Overall wins	CL	Conference losses	PL	Postseason losses
CC	Conference championships	OL	Overall losses	CT	Conference ties	PT	Postseason ties
NC	National championships	OT	Overall ties (Note: Overtime rules in college football were introduced in 1996, making ties impossible in the period since.)	C%	Conference winning percentage		
†	Elected to the College Football Hall of Fame	O%	Overall winning percentage (Note: When computing the win–loss percentage, a tie counts as half a win and half a loss.)				

== Coaches ==
List of head football coaches showing season(s) coached, overall records, conference records, postseason records, championships and selected awards (Note: Statistics correct as of the end of the 2025 NCAA Division I FBS football season.)
No.	Name	Season(s)	GC	OW	OL	OT	O%	CW	CL	CT	C%	PW	PL	PT	DC (Note: Divisional champions have advanced to the SEC Championship Game since the institution of divisional play beginning in the 1992 season. Since that time, Arkansas has competed as a member of the SEC West.)	CC	NC	Awards
1	John C. Futrall	1894–1896	7	5	2	0	0.714	—	—	—	—	—	—	—	—	—	0	—
2	B. N. Wilson	1897–1898	6	4	1	1	0.750	—	—	—	—	—	—	—	—	—	0	—
3	Colbert Searles	1899–1900	9	5	2	2	0.667	—	—	—	—	—	—	—	—	—	0	—
4	Charles Thomas	1901–1902	17	9	8	0	0.529	—	—	—	—	—	—	—	—	—	0	—
5	D. A. McDaniel	1903	7	3	4	0	0.429	—	—	—	—	—	—	—	—	—	0	—
6	A. D. Brown	1904–1905	17	6	11	0	0.353	—	—	—	—	—	—	—	—	—	0	—
7	Frank Longman	1906–1907	17	6	8	3	0.441	—	—	—	—	—	—	—	—	—	0	—
8	Hugo Bezdek^{†}	1908–1912	43	29	13	1	0.686	—	—	—	—	—	—	—	—	—	0	—
9	Earle T. Pickering	1913–1914	18	10	8	0	0.556	—	—	—	—	—	—	—	—	—	0	—
10	T. T. McConnell	1915–1916	15	8	6	1	0.567	1	3	0	0.250	0	0	0	—	0	0	—
11	Norman C. Paine	1917–1918	12	8	3	1	0.708	0	2	1	0.167	0	0	0	—	0	0	—
12	James B. Craig	1919	7	3	4	0	0.429	1	2	0	0.333	0	0	0	—	0	0	—
13	George McLaren^{†}	1920–1921	16	8	5	3	0.594	4	1	1	0.750	0	0	0	—	0	0	—
14	Francis Schmidt^{†}	1922–1928	65	41	21	3	0.654	14	13	2	0.518	0	0	0	—	0	0	—
15	Fred Thomsen	1929–1941	127	56	61	10	0.480	26	42	3	0.387	0	0	1	—	1	0	—
16	George Cole	1942	10	3	7	0	0.300	0	6	0	.000	0	0	0	—	0	0	—
17	John Tomlin	1943	9	2	7	0	0.222	1	4	0	0.200	0	0	0	—	0	0	—
18	Glen Rose	1944–1945	21	8	12	1	0.405	3	7	1	0.318	0	0	0	—	0	0	—
19	John Barnhill	1946–1949	42	22	17	3	0.560	10	13	1	0.438	1	0	1	—	1	0	—
20	Otis Douglas	1950–1952	30	9	21	0	0.300	4	14	0	0.222	0	0	0	—	0	0	—
21	Bowden Wyatt^{†}	1953–1954	21	11	10	0	0.524	7	5	0	0.583	0	1	0	—	1	0	—
22	Jack Mitchell	1955–1957	30	17	12	1	0.583	8	9	1	0.472	0	0	0	—	0	0	—
23	Frank Broyles^{†}	1958–1976	207	144	58	5	0.708	91	36	5	0.708	4	6	0	—	7	1 – 1964	AFCA Coach of the Year (1964)
24	Lou Holtz^{†}	1977–1983	83	60	21	2	0.735	37	18	1	0.670	3	2	1	—	1	0	College Football Coach of the Year (1977); FWAA Coach of the Year (1977); Sporting News College Football Coach of the Year (1977); Walter Camp Coach of the Year Award (1977)
25	Ken Hatfield	1984–1989	73	55	17	1	0.760	36	10	0	0.783	1	5	0	—	2	0	—
26	Jack Crowe (Note: Jack Crowe resigned as head coach on September 6, 1992, following a 10–3 loss to The Citadel. Joe Kines served as interim head coach for the remainder of the season, finishing with three wins, six losses and one tie.)	1990–1992	24	9	15	0	0.375	6	10	0	0.375	0	1	0	0	0	0	—
Int	Joe Kines	1992	10	3	6	1	0.350	3	4	1	0.438	0	0	0	0	0	0	—
27	Danny Ford	1993–1997	57	26	30	1	0.465	16	23	1	0.413	0	1	0	0	0	0	—
28	Houston Nutt (Note: Houston Nutt resigned as head coach on November 26, 2007. Reggie Herring served as interim head coach for the 2008 Cotton Bowl Classic loss against Missouri.)	1998–2007	123	75	48	—	0.610	42	38	—	0.525	2	5	—	3	0	0	AP SEC Coach of the Year (2001, 2006); SEC Coach of the Year (2001, 2006)
Int	Reggie Herring	2007	1	0	1	—	.000	0	0	—	.000	0	1	—	0	0	0	—
29; Int.	Bobby Petrino (Note: Bobby Petrino served as the interim head coach for the final seven games of the 2025 season after Sam Pittman was fired. As interim head coach Petrino complied an overall record of 0–7.)	2008–2011; 2025	58	34	24	—	0.586	17	22	—	0.436	2	1	—	0	0	0	—
30	John L. Smith	2012	12	4	8	—	0.333	2	6	—	0.250	0	0	—	0	0	0	—
31	Bret Bielema	2013–2017	62	29	33	—	0.468	11	29	—	0.275	2	1	—	0	0	0	
32	Chad Morris	2017–2019	22	4	18	—	0.182	0	14	—	.000	0	0	—	0	0	0	—
Int	Barry Lunney Jr.	2019	2	0	2	--	.000	0	2	--	.000	0	0	--	0	0	0	--
33	Sam Pittman	2020–2025	66	32	34	—	0.485	14	29	—	0.326	3	0	—	0	0	0	—
34	Ryan Silverfield	2026–present	6	2	4	—	0.333	0	3	—	.000	0	0	—	0	0	0	—
