= Marlon Davis (American football) =

American football player (born 1986)

Marlon Frank Davis
Profile
- Position: Guard

Personal information
- Born: November 2, 1986 (age 40); Columbus, Georgia, U.S.
- Listed height: 6 ft 2 in (1.88 m)
- Listed weight: 309 lb (140 kg)

Career information
- College: Alabama
- NFL draft: 2009: undrafted

Career history
- Cleveland Browns (2009)*; New York Jets (2010–2011)*
- * Offseason or practice squad member only

Marlon Frank Davis (born November 2, 1986) is an American former football offensive lineman. He played college football at Alabama and was signed by the Cleveland Browns as an undrafted free agent in 2009. He was also a member of the New York Jets.

== Professional career ==
=== Cleveland Browns ===
Davis, a projected late round prospect, was not selected in the 2009 NFL draft. The Cleveland Browns signed Davis to a contract on May 1, 2009. Davis was waived by the Browns four months later as part of the Browns' final roster cuts.

=== New York Jets ===
The Jets signed Davis on May 13, 2010 before the team waived him on August 14, 2010. The team officially announced on January 26, 2011 that Davis had been signed to a future contract. On July 29, he was waived by the Jets.
